= 2010 Formula Renault seasons =

2010 Formula Renault

Seasons
- ← 2009 2011 →

This article describes all the 2010 seasons of Formula Renault series across the world.

== Formula Renault 2.0L ==
=== 2010 Formula Renault 2.0 UK season ===
==== 2010 Formula Renault 2.0 UK Winter Series ====
See 2010 Formula Renault UK season.

=== 2010 Formula Renault BARC season ===
==== 2010 Formula Renault BARC Winter Series ====
See 2010 Formula Renault UK season.

=== 2010 Formula Renault 2.0 Italia season ===
- Point system : 32, 28, 24, 22, 20, 18, 16, 14, 12, 10, 8, 6, 4, 2, 1 for 15th. In each race 2 points for Fastest lap and 2 for Pole position.
- Races : 2 race by rounds length of 30 minutes each.

Pos	Driver	Team	(Italy) IMO May 15–16		(Italy) VAL May 29–30		(Italy) MNZ June 26–27		(Italy) MIS July 17–18		(Italy) MUG September 11–12		(Italy) IMO October 9–10		Points
Pos	Driver	Team	1	2	3	4	5	6	7	8	9	10	11	12	Points
1	(Italy) Francesco Frisone	Viola Formula Racing	3	Ret	2	2	4	1	1	2	3	5	1	5	292
2	(Italy) Andrea Cecchellero	Team Torino Motorsport	2	2	1	16	6	6	7	4	1	3	3	2	278
3	(Italy) Federico Vecchi	CO2 Motorsport	1	1	Ret	4	3	Ret	2	1	2	2	2	Ret	270
4	(Italy) Federico Gibbin	Viola Formula Racing	4	Ret	5	3	1	10	Ret	6	4	1	7	3	222
5	(Italy) Antonino Pellegrino	Scuderia Antonino			6	1	5	2	5	3	7	4	4	7	218
6	(Italy) Claudio Castiglioni	CO2 Motorsport	9	6	7	7	15	4	9	18	11	7	9	9	145
7	(Italy) Patrick Gobbo	Team Torino Motorsport	5	4	16	15	Ret	9	13	9	6	8	5	6	141
8	(Italy) Christian Mancinelli	Team Dynamic Engineering	7	3	15	14	Ret	Ret	Ret	Ret					111
8	(Italy) Christian Mancinelli	Facondini Racing									5	14			111
8	(Italy) Christian Mancinelli	GSK Motorsport / TT Racing											8	1	111
9	(Italy) Enrico Pison	Team Torino Motorsport	10	Ret	8	10	7	Ret	8	10	14	10	6	DNS	86
10	(Slovenia) Jaka Marinšek	AK Plamtex Sport	6	7	9	Ret	Ret	12	6	8	Ret	12	11	Ret	90
11	(Italy) Federico Scionti	GSK Motorsport / TT Racing					2	7	3	5					94
12	(Slovenia) Matevz Habjan	AK Plamtex Sport	11	9	12	11	11	3					10	8	66
13	(Italy) Edolo Ghirelli	One Racing			4	8	9	Ret	14	13	10	6			82
14	(Italy) Matteo Ciccaglioni	SG Motors			3	Ret	8	Ret	10	Ret	9	Ret	14	11	60
15	(Italy) Laura Polidori	LP Motorsport Competition	14	10	11	9			12	14	8	9	Ret	Ret	66
16	(Italy) Francesco Antonucci	CG Motorsport	12	5	10	5									56
17	(Italy) Andrea Baiguera	Brixia Autosport			Ret	Ret	12	8	16	15	12	11	12	10	35
18	(Italy) Damiano Manni	One Racing	8	8	13	6									50
19	(Italy) Luca Marco Spiga	GTR Racing					10	5	11	12					44
20	(Italy) Vittorio Ghirelli	One Racing							4	7					38
21	(Italy) Omar Mambretti	Team Torino Motorsport											DSQ	4	24
22	(Italy) Ettore Bassi	Team Torino Motorsport	13	Ret	17	12	14	13	Ret	16	13	13			24
23	(Italy) Alessandro Cisternino	PSR Motorsport	Ret	11	14	13									14
24	(Italy) Paolo Viero	Team Dynamic Engineering					13	11	15	17					13
25	(Mexico) Luís Michael Dörrbecker	Team Costa Rica / Facondini Racing							Ret	11					8

Pos	Team	Points
1	(Italy) Viola Formula Racing	514
2	(Italy) Team Torino Motorsport	441
3	(Italy) CO2 Motorsport	415
4	(Italy) Scuderia Antonino	218
5	(Slovenia) AK Plamtex Sport	188
6	(Italy) One Racing	170
7	(Italy) GSK Motorsport / TT Racing	140
8	(Italy) SG Motors	72
9	(Italy) LP Motorsport Competition	66
10	(Italy) Team Dynamic Engineering	56
11	(Italy) CG Motorsport	56
12	(Italy) Brixia Autosport	51
13	(Italy) GTR Racing	34
14	(Italy) Facondini Racing	22
15	(Italy) PSR Motorsport	14
16	Team Costa Rica / Facondini Racing	8

=== 2010 Formula Renault 2.0 Middle European Championship season ===
Replace the Formula Renault 2.0 Switzerland. Also known as LO MEC championship.

- Point system : 25, 22, 20, 18, 16, 14, 12, 10, 8, 6, 5, 4, 3, 2, 1 for 15th. Extra 1 point for Fastest lap and 2 points for Pole position.
- Races : 2 races per round.

Pos	Driver	Team	(France) DIJ April 3–4		(Germany) NUR May 1–2		(Czech Republic) MOS May 22–23		(Germany) HOC June 19–20		(France) MAG August 7–8		(Italy) MNZ September 25–26		Points
Pos	Driver	Team	1	2	3	4	5	6	7	8	9	10	11	12	Points
1	(Switzerland) Zoël Amberg	Jenzer Motorsport	1	1	1	2	2	1	1	1	2	2			243
2	(France) Bastien Borget	ARTA Engineering	4	6	5	5	4	3	3	2	1	1	2	1	229
3	(France) Yann Zimmer	ARTA Engineering	6	2											229
3	(France) Yann Zimmer	CO2 Motorsport			3	1	1	2	2	Ret	3	3	1	6	229
4	(Netherlands) Sam Looijenstein	CO2 Motorsport	9	9	6	Ret	Ret	5	4	3	7	4	4	2	159
5	(Russia) Maxim Zimin	Jenzer Motorsport	3	5	4	Ret	3	4	Ret	4	5	Ret			131
6	(Switzerland) Kurt Böhlen(1)	Equipe Bernoise	10	11	7	4	5	7	5	5	8	8	3	5	116
7	(France) Amir Mesny	ARTA Engineering			Ret	Ret	6	6			6	5	Ret	4	76
8	(Italy) Federico Gibbin	Viola Formula Racing	8	10	2	3									62
9	(France) Alexandre Cougnaud	ARTA Engineering									4	Ret	Ret	3	38
10	(France) Julien Deschamps	ARTA Engineering	5	4											38
11	(Switzerland) Joël Volluz	Ecurie 13 Etoiles – Valais	7	7											28
12	(Italy) Alberto Viberti	Viola Formula Racing	11	8											20
13	(Switzerland) Christophe Hurni(2)	Ecurie des 3 Chevrons	12	12											20
13	(Switzerland) Christophe Hurni(2)	Sports-Promotion									9	7			20
14	(Switzerland) Thomas Aregger	Equipe Bernoise							Ret	DNS	10	6			20
The following drivers are not eligible for the final standing
–	(Switzerland) Patric Niederhauser	Jenzer Motorsport	2	3											–

- (1) = ineligible for points during the first 2 race weekends
- (2) = ineligible for points during the first race weekend

=== 2010 Formule Renault 2.0 North European Zone and Sweden season ===
- Point system : 25, 18, 15, 12, 10, 8, 6, 4, 2, 1 for 10th. 1 point for Fastest lap and 1 for Pole position.
- All FR2.0 Sweden rounds were held together with NEZ series and vice versa. The two series use the same point system and hence final standings of the two championships are identical.

Pos	Driver	Team	(Sweden) KNU May 7–8		(Finland) KEM May 14–15		(Sweden) KAR May 21–22		(Finland) ALA June 11–12		(Estonia) PAR July 9–10		(Finland) AHV September 10–11		(Sweden) MAN October 1–2		Points
Pos	Driver	Team	1	2	3	4	5	6	7	8	9	10	11	12	13	14	Points
1	(Sweden) Daniel Roos	Team BS Motorsport	1	1	1	1	1	1	3	7	2	Ret	3	Ret	4	3	242
2	(Sweden) Kevin Kleveros	Trackstar Racing	5	2	3	2	3	2	1	1	9	2	4	3	2	1	237
3	(Sweden) Mattias Lindberg	Team BS Motorsport	2	3	2	3	2	7	6	3	Ret	4	2	2	1	2	208
4	(Finland) Miika Kunranta	Koiranen Bros. Motorsport	6	Ret	6	5			5	4	1	1	Ret	6	5	5	128
5	(Sweden) John Bryant-Meisner	Team BS Motorsport	7	9	4	4	4	3	11	8	5	7	5	4	6	6	117
6	(Estonia) Johannes Moor	T. T. Racing	3	10	9	Ret			4	2	3	3	6	5	8	10	101
7	(Estonia) Antti Rammo	P1 Motorsport; T. T. Racing	4	11	5	6	5	4	Ret	6	Ret	6	7	8	10	7	85
8	(Sweden) Ronnie Lundströmer	Trackstar Racing	10	7			7	5	8	9	6	Ret	8	7	3	4	75
9	(Finland) Oskari Kurki-Suonio	Scuderia Nordica			7	7			2	5	8	5			Ret	9	56
10	(Finland) Jesse Krohn	P1 Motorsport											1	1			54
11	(Finland) Marcus Nykopp	Koiranen Bros. Motorsport	Ret	6	10	8			7	Ret	4	8	9	9	7	11	45
12	(Lithuania) Eimantas Siaurys	Trackstar Racing	11	8	11	9	6	6	9	10	7	Ret	10	10	9	8	39
13	(Finland) Henri Rajala	Team Rajala	9	5	8	Ret			10	11	Ret	Ret					17
14	(Sweden) Daniel Ivarsson	Alex Motorsport	8	4											11	12	16
15	(Sweden) Alexander Andersson	Alex Motorsport					8	8									8
Guest drivers ineligible for points
	(Sweden) Måns Grenhagen	Team BS Motorsport													13	14	
	(Sweden) Mattias Lorén	Trackstar Racing													12	13	

=== 2010 Formula Renault 2.0 Finland season ===
- Point system : 25, 18, 15, 12, 10, 8, 6, 4, 2, 1.

Pos	Driver	Team	(Sweden) Knutstorp May 7–8		(Finland) Kemora May 14–15		(Finland) Alastaro June 11–12		(Estonia) Pärnu July 9–10		(Finland) Ahvenisto September 10–11		(Sweden) Mantorp October 1–2		Points
Pos	Driver	Team	1	2	3	4	5	6	7	8	9	10	11	12	Points
1	(Finland) Miika Kunranta	Koiranen Bros. Motorsport	6	Ret	6	11	5	4	1	1	Ret	6	5	5	120
2	(Estonia) Johannes Moor	T. T. Racing	3	10	9	Ret	4	2	3	3	6	5	8	10	101
3	(Estonia) Antti Rammo	P1 Motorsport; T. T. Racing	4	11	5	5	Ret	6	Ret	6	7	8	10	7	65
4	(Finland) Oskari Kurki-Suonio	Scuderia Nordica			7	6	2	5	8	5			Ret	9	58
5	(Finland) Marcus Nykopp	Koiranen Bros. Motorsport	Ret	6	10	7	7	Ret	4	8	9	9	7	11	47
6	(Finland) Henri Rajala	Team Rajala	9	5	8	Ret	10	11	Ret	Ret					17
Guest drivers ineligible for points
	(Sweden) John Bryant-Meisner	Team BS Motorsport	7	9	4	4	11	8	5	7	5	4	6	6	
	(Sweden) Måns Grenhagen	Team BS Motorsport											13	14	
	(Sweden) Daniel Ivarsson	Alex Motorsport	8	4									11	12	
	(Sweden) Kevin Kleveros	Trackstar Racing	5	2	3	2	1	1	9	2	4	3	2	1	
	(Finland) Jesse Krohn	P1 Motorsport									1	1			
	(Sweden) Mattias Lindberg	Team BS Motorsport	2	3	2	3	6	3	Ret	4	2	2	1	2	
	(Sweden) Mattias Lorén	Trackstar Racing											12	13	
	(Sweden) Ronnie Lundströmer	Trackstar Racing	10	7			8	9	6	Ret	8	7	3	4	
	(Sweden) Daniel Roos	Team BS Motorsport	1	1	1	1	3	7	2	Ret	3	Ret	4	3	
	(Lithuania) Eimantas Siaurys	Trackstar Racing	11	8	11	9	9	10	7	Ret	10	10	9	8	

=== 2010 Asian Formula Renault Challenge season ===
- Point system : 30, 24, 20, 17, 15, 13, 11, 9, 7, 5, 4, 3, 2, 1 for 14th. No points for Fastest lap or Pole position. Drivers, that start their season at round 5 or later, don't receive any points for the final standing. The team point attribution is different from the driver point system : 10, 8, 6, 5, 4, 3, 2, 1.
- Races : 2 races by rounds.

The Asian Challenge Category (A) reward the best Asian driver. All races were held in China.

Pos	Driver	Team	Zhuhai April 24–25		Zhuhai May 22–23		Chengdu July 17–18		Shanghai August 14		Zhuhai September 18–19		Zhuhai October 28–29		Zhuhai December 11–12		Points	Points (A)
Pos	Driver	Team	a	b	1	2	3	4	5	6	7	8	9	10	11	12	Points	Points (A)
1	(Thailand) Sandy Nicholas Stuvik	Asia Racing Team	1	2	2	2	2	2	2	2	1	3	3	1	2	1	286	290
2	(Thailand) Tin Sritrai	Asia Racing Team	4	8	4	Ret	4	5	8	9	4	2	1	2	4	2	197.5	211.5
3	(Venezuela) Samín Gómez Briceño	Top Speed Racing Team	Ret	Ret	5	4	5	4	7	6	6	4	2	3	3	4	194.5	
4	(China) Hong Wei Cao	FRD Racing Team					1	1	1	1	3	1					155	155
5	(China) Zhi Cong Li	PTRS Team (a–4); Asia Racing Team (5–12)	8	4	DNS	1	6	6	16	8	2	13	6	4	Ret	5	134.5	159.5
6	(Singapore) Suriya Bala Kerisnan Thevar	Asia Racing Team			3	3					Ret	6	8	5	1	Ret	111	119
7	(Italy) Angelo Negro	Top Speed Racing Team	7	6	Ret	Ret	8	8	11	11	10	7	5	6	6	7	102	
8	(Indonesia) Alexandra Asmasoebrata	Champ Motorsport							12	13	12	8	4	7	Ret	6	67	95.5
9	(China) He Xiao Le	FRD Racing Team	5	Ret			3	3	6	7	Ret	Ret					58.5	65.5
10	(France) Patrice Bonzom	Top Speed Racing Team	9	9	7	Ret	9	9	13	12					7	8	48.5	
11	(Macau) Ran Zhang	Asia Racing Team					10	Ret	14	15	Ret	11	10	8	8	10	45	87.5
12	(Hong Kong) David Lau Ying Kit	Champ Motorsport			6	Ret					Ret	12	9	9	DNS	9	43	63
13	(Japan) Kei Yamaura	Champ Motorsport													5	3	35	37
14	(China) Shan Qi Zhang	PTRS Team	3	7	1	Ret											30	30
15	(Republic of Ireland) Kevin O'Hara	Champ Motorsport (1–2); Top Speed Racing Team (5–6)			Ret	Ret			3	4							28.5	
16	(Hong Kong) Jim Ka To	Champ Motorsport							5	3							25	30
17	(New Zealand) Andrew Waite	PTRS Team							4	5							24.5	
18	(Spain) Guillermo Pintanel	Champ Motorsport (3–4); FRD Racing Team (5–6)					7	7	Ret	Ret							22	
19	(Chinese Taipei) Jimmy Lin	PTRS Team							10	10							7.5	18.5
20	(Republic of Ireland) Daniel Polley	Top Speed Racing Team							9	Ret							7	
21	(Hong Kong) Alan Lee	FRD Racing Team							17	14							0.5	7.5
22	(China) Zhou Yong Tan	PTRS Team							15	Ret							0	
23	(China) Pham Thang-Kim	Champ Motorsport							Ret	Ret							0	
The following drivers are ineligible to final standing
–	(Hong Kong) Luca Ferigutti	Asia Racing Team	2	1							Ret	Ret					–	
–	(Hong Kong) Victor Yung Hau Woon	Champ Motorsport	6	5							5	10					–	
–	(Hong Kong) Mun Shien Chang	Champ Motorsport	Ret	3													–	
–	(Macau) Un Wai Kai	Champ Motorsport									8	5					–	
–	(Hong Kong) Sunny Wong Yat Shing	Champ Motorsport	10	Ret							7	Ret	7	Ret			–	
–	(Macau) Yiu Ivo	Champ Motorsport									11	9					–	
–	(Macau) Diana Rosario	FRD Racing Team									9	Ret					–	

- Rounds a and b indicate pre season races that didn't count toward championship standing.

Pos	Team	Points	Points (A)
1	(China) Asia Racing Team	108	108
2	(Hong Kong) Top Speed Racing Team	79	-
3	(China) Champ Motorsport	55.5	58
4	(China) FRD Racing Team	47	51
5	(Chinese Taipei) PTRS Team	33	36.5

== Formula Renault 1.6L ==
=== 2010 F4 Eurocup 1.6 season ===
Replace the Formul'Academy Euro Series.

== Other Formulas powered by Renault championships ==
=== 2010 GP2 Series seasons ===
The GP2 Series and GP2 Asia Series are powered by 4 litre Renault V8 engines and Bridgestone tyres with a Dallara chassis.

=== 2010 Austria Formel Renault Cup season ===
The season will be probably held on 14 rounds in 7 venues in Czech Republic, Germany, France and Austria. The races occur with other categories cars: Austrian Formula 3, Formelfrei and Formula 3,5L like (Renault 3,5L from Words Series, Lola Cosworth). This section present only the Austrian Formula Renault 2.0L classification.

- Point system : 20, 15, 12, 10, 8, 6, 4, 3, 2, 1 for 10th. No points for Fastest lap or Pole position.

Pos	Driver	Team	(Germany) Hockenheim April 17–18		(Czech Republic) Most May 22–23		(Germany) Lausitz June 18–19		(Germany) Hockenheim July 3–4		(France) Magny-Cours August 7–8		(Austria) Salzburg September 25–26		(Germany) Hockenheim October 9–10		Points
Pos	Driver	Team	1	2	3	4	5	6	7	8	9	10	11	12	13	14	Points
1	(France) Grégory Striebig	Striebig	4	4	4	5	1	1	5	10	3	5	3	2	6	Ret	140
2	(France) Franck Seemann	SF Racing	11	9	3	4	Ret		2	2	2	2	Ret	4	5	5	110
3	(Germany) Kai Boller	Boller			2	3			1	1					2	1*	102
4	(France) Rémy Striebig	Striebig	5	6	5	Ret	Ret	4	7	4	5	3	5	7	7	Ret	82
5	(Austria) Johann Ledermair	Franz Wöss Racing	1*	1*									1*	1*			80
6	(France) Rémi Kirchdörffer	Kirchdörffer	10	10	Ret	6	Ret	3*	4	3	7	6	2	5	Ret	7	79
7	(Italy) Antonino Pellegrino	Scuderia Antonino	2	2	1*	2											65
8	(Switzerland) Thomas Amweg	Equipe Bernoise	12	DNS(1)	DNS(1)	1*					1	1					60
9	(Switzerland) Urs Maier	Danau Racing Team					2*	2	6	6	4	8					55
10	(Switzerland) Manuel Amweg	Equipe Bernoise	DNS(1)	5	6	DNS(1)			8	5			Ret	3	10	4	48
11	(France) Philipp Leclere	Leclere	7	12	7	7			10	8	6	7			8	Ret	29
12	(Germany) Sebastian von Gartzen	SL Formula Racing													3	2	27
13	(Finland) Oskari Kurki-Suonio	Team Scuderia Nordica	3	3													24
14	(France) Steeve Gerard	Gerard													4	3	22
15	(Estonia) Marko Asmer	Team Scuderia Nordica													1*		20
16	(Estonia) Marek Kiisa	Team Scuderia Nordica	9	8					3	Ret							17
17	(Slovenia) Klemen Campa	V-racing Velenje											4	6			16
18	(Estonia) Toomas Annus	Team Scuderia Nordica	8	11					9	7					Ret	6	15
19	(France) Gilles Brenier	Brenier									Ret	4					10
20	(Austria) Michael Plassnig	Top Speed	6	7													10
21	(France) Jerome Christoph	Christoph													9	8	5
22	(Estonia) Urmas Söörumaa	Team Scuderia Nordica							11	9					Ret	Ret	2
23	(Estonia) Georg Vonna	Team Scuderia Nordica														DSQ	0

(1) = Thomas and Manuel Amweg share their car for the venue.

=== 2010 Formula 2000 Light season ===
This is the third season of the Formula 2000 Light held in Italy. The series use Tatuus Formula Renault or Dallara Formula 3 chassis with 2000 cc maximum engines and Michelin tyres. This year a Formula 2000 Top without Tatuus chassis and less powerful Formula 1600 Light (1.6L) classes are introduced and race mixed up with the main F2000 class.

- Point system : 32, 28, 24, 22, 20, 18, 16, 14, 12, 10, 8, 6, 4, 2, 1 for 15th. In each race 2 point for Fastest lap. 3 points for Pole position in first race.
- Races : 2 races by rounds.

The F2000 championship reward several sub categories :

- Over 35 : for drivers older than 35 years old (+).
- Under 17 : for drivers younger than 17 years old (−).
- Formula 3 : for drivers using Formula 3 chassis (F3).
- Team : for racing team involved in all venues.

The rounds a and b held in Franciacorta, March 13–14 are the opening venue and doesn't reward points.

Pos	Driver	Team	(Italy) Franciacorta March 13–14		(Italy) Vallelunga April 10–11		(Italy) Imola May 22–23		(Germany) Hockenheim June 24–25		(France) Magny-Cours August 7–8		(Italy) Adria September 4–5		(Italy) Monza October 2–3		Points
Pos	Driver	Team	a	b	1	2	3	4	5	6	7	8	9	10	11	12	Points
1	(Italy) Stefano Turchetto	TS Corse			2	4	1	6*	2	2*	1*	2*	1*	1*	15	1	342
2	(Italy) Kevin Damico	TJ Emme			5	6	8	7	3	3	2	3	2	2	4	3	280
3	(Italy) Luca Mingotti (+)	AP Motorsport	1	1	Ret	10	4	3	4	4	5	5	4	4	5	5	232
4	(Italy) Antonino Pellitteri	Tomcat Racing	2	Ret	4	5	3	2	7	9	11	6	8	5	6	10	218
5	(Italy) Oscar Bana	AP Motorsport			6	8	7	5	Ret	6	10	8	6	7	7	6	184
6	(Italy) Alessandro Tolfo	Facondini Racing			7	19	16	9	5	5	4	4	3	3	16	DSQ	163
7	(Italy) Omar Mambretti	Torino Motorsport			1*	2*	6*	Ret							Ret	4*	113
8	(Italy) Simone Patrinicola (−)	TJ Emme			9	Ret	Ret	8	13	Ret	3	7	5	13	9	Ret	110
9	(Italy) Mario Bertolotti	TJ Emme			3	3	2	1	Ret	Ret							108
10	(Italy) Luca Spiga (−)	GTR Racing	8	3	16	18	Ret	Ret	9	10	6	9	12	10	13*	11	90
11	(Italy) Andrea Boffo (−)	GTR Racing (a–6); Torino Motorsport (9–12)	3	Ret	Ret	7	11	11	Ret	Ret			7	8	8	Ret	78
12	(Germany) Thiemo Storz	Co2 Motorsport							1*	1							69
13	(Italy) Emmanuele Piva	Durango	4	6	10	13	Ret	15	Ret	15†			13	6	2	Ret	68
14	(Russia) Alexander Pugachev	TJ Emme			13	Ret	Ret	13	14	13	9	11	11	15	14	12	59
15	(Mexico) Luis Michael Dörrbecker	Team Costa Rica							8	8			Ret	9	Ret	9	56
16	(Italy) Cristian Corsini	Co2 Motorsport													1	7	50
17	(Italy) Marco Zanasi (+)	Patata Racing (3–4); Di e Gi Motorsport (7–8)					10	10			8	10					46
18	(Italy) Enrico Pison	Torino Motorsport					5	4									42
19	(Italy) Simone Gatto (+)	TS Corse			8	12	Ret	Ret					10	16	Ret	18†	33
20	(Italy) Federico Vecchi	Co2 Motorsport			18	1											32
21	(Italy) Angelo Baiguera	Brixia (a–6); Co2 Motorsport (7–8)	7	5					10	Ret	7	13†					32
22	(Italy) Baldassarre Curatolo (−)	Durango			17	Ret	Ret	16	12	Ret			14	12	10	17†	28
23	(Italy) Matteo Davenia	Durango							6	11							26
24	(Monaco) Alfredo Maisto (+)	Patata Racing (3–4); Di e Gi Motorsport (5–12)					15	14	15	14	12	12	Ret	17	17	DNS	20
25	(Slovenia) Klemen Campa	Plamtex											9	11			20
26	(Italy) Federico Porri (+)	Keks Motorsport					13	Ret							11	15	18
27	(Italy) Claudio Castiglioni (+)	Co2 Motorsport			12	11											16
28	(Slovenia) Jaka Marinšek (−)	AP Motorsport							Ret	7							16
29	(Italy) Paolo Coppi (+)	AP Motorsport (3–4); Co2 Motorsport (9–10)					9	Ret					15†	14			15
30	(Italy) Michèle Lenzo	Facondini Racing							11	12							14
31	(Italy) Paolo Bonetti	Co2 Motorsport													12	14	14
32	(Italy) Gabriele Rugin	Facondini Racing	6	2	15	14	14	12									13
33	(Italy) Giorgio Ferri (+)	Keks Motorsport			11	16											9
–	(Italy) Antonio D'Avilla	Co2 Motorsport					12	Ret									0
–	(Italy) Alessandro Perini	Durango			14	15	17	Ret									0
–	(Italy) Paolo Viero (+)	Torino Motorsport			Ret	17							Ret	Ret			0
–	Pierluigi Veronesi	TJ Emme											Ret	Ret			0
–	(Italy) Andrè Claude Benin	Di e Gi Motorsport													Ret	13	0
The following drivers race in the without Tatuus chassis Formula 2000 Top category
–	(Italy) Paolo Coppi (+) (F3)	AP Motorsport (1–2); Puresport (11–12)			Ret	9									3	2*	0
–	(Italy) Mario Bertolotti (FA)	Co2 Motorsport									Ret	1*					0
–	Simone Simonti (F3)	Puresport													Ret*	DNS	0
–	Dino Lusuardi (F3)	Systemteam													DNS	16	0
–	(Italy) Paolo Viero (+) (F3)	Torino Motorsport													Ret	8	0
–	Pierluigi Veronesi (F3)	Systemteam													Ret	DNS	0
The following drivers are not eligible to final standing
–	(Italy) Andrè Claude Benin (F1600)	Di e Gi Motorsport	Ret	7													–
–	(Netherlands) Sam Looijenstein	Co2 Motorsport	Ret*	4*													–
–	(Italy) Andrea Capella (F1600)	Di e Gi Motorsport	Ret	8													–

† = Did not finish but classified for standing

- (−) = Indicate drivers younger than 17 years old.
- (+) = Indicate drivers older than 35 years old.
- (F3) = Indicate drivers using Dallara Formula 3 chassis with Opel or Fiat engine.
- (FA)= Formula Abarth
- (FG)= Formula Gloria
- (FM)= Formula Master
- (w) = indicate women drivers

==== 2010 Formula 2000 Light Winter Trophy ====
- Point system: 32, 28, 24, 22, 20, 18, 16, 14, 12, 10, 8, 6, 4, 2, 1 for 15th. Also 3 points for pole position and 2 for fasted lap.

Pos	Driver	Team	(Italy) Adria November 13–14		Points
Pos	Driver	Team	1	2	Points
1	(Italy) Adolfo Bottura (FM)	Privateer	1*	1*	0
1	(Italy) Emmanuele Piva	Durango Engineering	2	3	0
1	(Italy) Luca Spiga (−)	GTR Motorsport	4	2	0
1	(Italy) Andrea Boffo (−)	Team Torino Motorsport	3	4	0
1	(Monaco) Alfredo Maisto (+)	Di e Gi Motorsport	5	6	0
1	(France) Rémy Kirchdoerffer	1 Senstronic	6	5	0

=== 2010 F2000 de las Américas season ===
- Point system: unknown.
- Races: 2 races per round.

Pos	Driver	Team	(Costa Rica) La Guácima July 17–18		(Costa Rica) La Guácima November 13–14		Points
Pos	Driver	Team	1	2	3	4	Points
1	(Panama) Gianni Alessandría		1	3	1	5	?
1	(Costa Rica) Verónica Valverde		2	4	2	6	?
1	(Costa Rica) Nicole Solano		3	7	7	7	?
1	(Costa Rica) Bernal Valverde			9†	6	1	?
1	(Costa Rica) Juan Ignacio Pérez		4†	1			?
1	(Panama) Freddy Zebede				3	2	?
1	(United States) Ben Searcy		5	2			?
1	(Costa Rica) André Solano				5	3	?
1	(Mexico) Marco Tolama				4	8†	?
1	(Guatemala) Juan Pablo Glover				8†	4	?
1	(Costa Rica) Carlos Rodríguez		7†	6			?
1	(Costa Rica) Felipe Vargas		6†	8†			?
1	(United States) Ben Crawford		DNS	5			?
1	(Costa Rica) Jean Valerio			10†			?

=== 2010 Formula Renault 2.0 Argentina season ===
All cars use Tito 02 chassis.

- Point system : 20, 15, 12, 10, 8, 6, 4, 3, 2, 1 for 10th. 1 point for Pole position. 1 extra point in each race for participating driver.

Pos	Driver	Team	Points
1	(Argentina) Nicolás Trosset	Werner Plan Rombo	166
2	(Argentina) Franco Vivian	FIV Fórmula	159
3	(Argentina) Kevin Icardi	Werner Plan Rombo	139
4	(Argentina) Franco Girolami	Gastón Dammiano Motorsport	117
5	(Argentina) Mario Gerbaldo	Gabriel Werner Competición	71
6	(Argentina) Ayrton Molina	GF Racing	71
7	(Argentina) Antonino García	JLS Motorsport	62
8	(Argentina) Gianfranco Collino	Litoral Group	40
9	(Argentina) Facundo Mario Conta	Gabriel Werner Competición	38
10	(Argentina) Bruno Etman	Werner Jr.	38
11	(Argentina) Agustín Calamari	GF Racing	37
12	(Argentina) Martín Aimar	Werner Plan Rombo	36
13	(Argentina) Roberto Arato	Litoral Group	31
14	(Argentina) Marcos Muchiut	Werner Jr.	27
15	(Argentina) Oscar Ignacio Conta	GF Racing Junior	25
16	(Argentina) Geraldo Salaverría	GF Racing	22
17	(Argentina) Alan Castellano	Litoral Group	19
18	(Argentina) Carlos Agustín Giuliani	GR Sport Team / Litoral Group	17
19	(Argentina) Claudio di Noto Rama	NQN Racing / Gabriel Werner Competición	16
20	(Argentina) Francisco Troncoso	GF Racing	16
21	(Argentina) Ignacio Vivian	FIV Fórmula	16
22	(Argentina) Emmanuel Caseres	Basco Racing Team	15
23	(Argentina) Rodrigo Rogani	GR Sport Team / Bouvier Racing	15
24	(Argentina) Matías Galeto Ilevarón	GR Sport Team / FIV Fórmula	13
25	(Argentina) Amadis Farina	JLS Motorsport	11
26	(Argentina) Federico Moises	MSG	9
27	(Argentina) Gastón Rossi	Bouvier Racing	9
28	(Argentina) Juan Manuel Basco	Basco Racing Team	7
29	(Argentina) Matías Muñoz Marchesi	Bouvier Racing	6
30	(Argentina) Wilson Borgnino	GR Sport Team	4
31	(Argentina) Ignácio Julián	JLS Motorsport	4
32	(Argentina) Nicolás Meichtri	Gastón Dammiano Motorsport	4
33	(Argentina) Franco Riva	Riva Racing	4
34	(Chile) Martín Scuncio	Bouvier Racing	4
35	(Argentina) Mario Valle	RV Croizet	4
36	(Argentina) Fernando Barrere	Gabriel Werner Competición	3
37	(Argentina) Osvaldo Perea	Bouvier Racing	2

=== 2010 Fórmula Renault Plus season ===
The series is held partially on the same rounds than its secondary series Fórmula Renault Interprovencial. It use Crespi chassis.

- Point system : 20, 15, 12, 10, 8, 6, 4, 3, 2, 1 for 10th. Extra 1 point for Pole position. All drivers receive 1 point for take part of the qualifying session.

Pos	Driver	Team	Points
1	(Argentina) Julián Santero		115
2	(Argentina) Matías Cantarini		70
3	(Argentina) Franco Bosio		69
4	(Argentina) Pablo Teres		60
5	(Argentina) Franco Mezzelani		51
6	(Argentina) Andrés Bavorevo		49
7	(Argentina) Ever Franetovich		43
8	(Argentina) María José Lorenzzati		43
9	(Argentina) Juan Gabarra		37
10	(Argentina) Daniel Gabarra		25
11	(Argentina) Maximiliano Terzoni		24
12	(Argentina) Wilson Borgino		21
13	(Argentina) Gastón Riberi		14
14	(Argentina) Julia Ballario		13
15	(Argentina) Alfredo Martini		13
16	(Argentina) Juan Manuel Cabalén		12
17	(Argentina) Javier Merlo		11
18	(Argentina) Guillermo Rey		9
19	(Mexico) Eduardo Moreno		8
20	(Argentina) Juan Cruz Ferrero		8
21	(Argentina) Fabián Bellagamba		8
22	(Argentina) Maximiliano Bestani		7
23	(Argentina) Nicolás Dominici		6
24	(Brazil) Carlos Moreira		6
25	(Argentina) Patricio Cruz		6
26	(Argentina) Nicolás Carranza		6
27	(Argentina) Andrés Cief		5
28	(Argentina) Fernando Martino		4
29	(Argentina) Vicente Ripani		4
30	(Argentina) Juan Ignacio Botalo		3
31	(Argentina) Dario Elisei		2
32	(Argentina) Míguel Reginatto		2
33	(Venezuela) Matías Muños		1
34	(Argentina) José Broggi		1
35	(Argentina) Agustín Miotti		1
36	(Argentina) William Sánchez		1
37	(Argentina) Damián Marí		1
38	(Argentina) Sebastián Gurrieri		1
39	(Argentina) Marcelo Ciarriochi		1
40	(Argentina) Martín Melhem		1

=== 2010 Fórmula Renault Interprovencial season ===
The series is held in the same rounds than its main series Fórmula Renault Plus.

- Point system : 20, 15, 12, 10, 8, 6, 4, 3, 2, 1 for 10th. Extra 1 point for Pole position. All drivers receive 1 point for take part of the qualifying session.

Pos	Driver	Team	Points
1	(Argentina) Julian Santero		89
2	(Argentina) Pablo Teres		72
3	(Argentina) Franco Bosio		57
4	(Argentina) Matías Cantanari		56
5	(Argentina) Andrés Bavorevo		49
6	(Argentina) Maria José Lorenzatti		47
7	(Argentina) Juan José Gabarra		33
8	(Argentina) Franco Mezzelani		26
9	(Argentina) Daniel Gabarra		23
10	(Argentina) Ever Franetovich		21
11	(Argentina) Maximiliano Terzoni		21
12	(Argentina) Wilson Borgino		17
13	(Argentina) Gastón Riberi		15
14	(Argentina) Julia Ballario		11
15	(Argentina) Juan Manuel Cabalén		10
16	(Mexico) Eduardo Moreno		8
17	(Argentina) Juan Cruz Ferrero		8
18	(Argentina) Javier Merlo		7
19	(Argentina) Nicolás Carranza		6
20	(Argentina) Fabián Bellagamba		6
21	(Argentina) Maximiliano Bestani		5
22	(Brazil) Carlos Moreira		5
23	(Argentina) Patricio Cruz		5
24	(Argentina) Andrés Cief		5
25	(Argentina) Nicolás Dominico		4
26	(Argentina) Fernando Martino		4
27	(Argentina) Guillermo Rey		4
28	(Argentina) Juan Ignacio Botalo		3
29	(Argentina) Vicente Ripani		3
30	(Argentina) Dario Elisei		2
31	(Venezuela) Matías Muños		1
32	(Argentina) Agustín Miotti		1
33	(Argentina) William Sánchez		1
34	(Argentina) José Broggi		1
35	(Argentina) Martín Melhem		1

=== 2010 Fórmula Metropolitana season ===
The series was held in Argentina. Cars use Renault Clio K4M engine (1598cc) with low power than the former Fórmula 4 Nacional series held in 2007. Teams can choose chassis manufacturer (Crespi, Tulia, Tito...).

- Point system : 20, 15, 12, 10, 8, 6, 4, 3, 2, 1 for 10th. Extra 1 point for Pole position and 1 point for completed race.

Pos	Driver	Team	Points
1	(Argentina) Lucas Alonso	Scuderia Ramini	127
2	(Argentina) Federico Fastuca	Castro Racing	74
3	(Argentina) Alan Ruggiero	Soncini Racing	63
4	(Argentina) Pablo Costanzo	Satorra Competición	61
5	(Argentina) Bernardo Poggi	Ré Competición	55
6	(Argentina) Sebastián Catellani	Catellani Competición	48
7	(Argentina) Emanuel Sagratella	Soncini Racing	36
8	(Argentina) Gastón Rossi	Scuderia Ramini	27
9	(Argentina) Hernén Bueno	DG Competición	26
10	(Argentina) Luciano Farroni	Satorra Competición	23
11	(Argentina) Enzo Pieraligi		23
12	(Argentina) Gonzálo Fabi		22
13	(Argentina) Diego Escudero		15
14	(Argentina) Tomás Marino	Cassalins Competición	13
15	(Argentina) Lucas Valle	Croizet Racing	10
16	(Canada) Brian Atkinson	DG Competición	9
17	(Argentina) Claudio di Noto Rama	Satorra Competición	9
18	(Argentina) Julián Favilene		9
19	(Argentina) Leonardo Martino		9
20	(Argentina) Maximiliano Valle	Croizet Racing	9
21	(Argentina) Ignacio Tartara	Scuderia Ramini	6
22	(Argentina) Horacio Albigini Rico		4
23	(Argentina) Matías Marin	Cassalins Competición	3
24	(Argentina) Nicolás Furlán		2
25	(Argentina) Jean Catalano		1
26	(Argentina) Carlos Javier Merlo	Castro Racing	1

== Formula One ==
Teams powered by Renault Engines in the 2010 Formula One season. Both teams are using the Renault RS27 V8 engine.

- Renault F1 Team:
- Red Bull Racing:

Colour	Result
Gold	Winner
Silver	2nd place
Bronze	3rd place
Green	Finished, in points
Green	Retired, in points
Blue	Finished, no points
Purple	Did not finish (Ret)
Purple	Not classified (NC)
Red	Did not qualify (DNQ)
Black	Disqualified (DSQ)
White	Did not start (DNS)
White	Withdrew (WD)
Blank	Did not participate
Blank	Injured (INJ)
Blank	Excluded (EX)
**Bold**	Pole position
*	Fastest lap
spr	Sprint Race
fea	Feature Race
