= Finnish Formula Three Championship =

- Category: Single-seaters
- Country: Finland, North Europe
- Inaugural season: 1958
- Folded: 2010
- Constructors: Dallara
- Last Drivers' champion: (Finland) Jani Tammi
- Last Teams' champion: (Finland) Oakra F3
- Official website: nordicf3masters.eu

The Finnish Formula Three Championship was a single seater motor racing series based in Finland. The championship used small Formula Three cars, designed to give drivers experience before moving to higher levels of motor racing. The Finnish Formula Three Championship ran from 1958 to 1960, 1984 to 1986 and 2000 to 2009, and for its final season in 2010 it became known as the Nordic F3 Masters.

An independent championship known as the Scandinavian & Nordic Formula Three Championship ran from 1984 to 1985 and 1992 to 2001.

== Scoring system ==
Nordic F3 Masters scoring system
| 1st | 2nd | 3rd | 4th | 5th | 6th | 7th | 8th | 9th | 10th | 11th | 12th |
|---|---|---|---|---|---|---|---|---|---|---|---|
| 25 | 20 | 16 | 14 | 12 | 10 | 8 | 6 | 4 | 3 | 2 | 1 |

== Champions ==
| Season | Series Name | Champion | Team |
|---|---|---|---|
| 1958 | Finnish F3 Championship | (Finland) Heimo Hietarinta | none |
| 1959 | Finnish F3 Championship | (Finland) Curt Lincoln | none |
| 1960 | Finnish F3 Championship | (Finland) Heimo Hietarinta | none |
| 1961– 1983 | not held | | |
| 1984 | Finnish F3 Championship | (Finland) Jari Koiranen | (Finland) Lahti Racing |
| 1985 | Finnish F3 Championship | (Finland) Sami Pensala | (Finland) Kuomu Sport |
| 1986 | Finnish F3 Championship | (Finland) Jorma Airaksinen | (Finland) Bisse Racing |
| 1987– 1999 | not held | | |
| 2000 | Finnish F3 Championship | (Finland) Marko Nevalainen | (Finland) Motor Up Racing |
| 2001 | Finnish F3 Championship | (Finland) Jari Koivisto | (Finland) Jari Koivisto F3 Racing |
| 2002 | Finnish CUP | (Finland) Jussi Pinomäki | (Finland) Niinivirta Motorsport |
| 2003 | Finnish F3 Championship | (Italy) Andrea Belicchi | (Russia) Lukoil Racing |
| 2004 | Finnish F3 Championship | (Finland) Teemu Tanninen | (Finland) Polameri Team |
| 2005 | Finnish F3 Championship | (Finland) Jari Koivisto | (Finland) Jari Koivisto F3 Racing |
| 2006 | Finnish F3 Championship | (Finland) Arto Taimi | (Finland) TCB Racing |
| 2007 | Finnish F3 Championship | (Finland) Tomi Limmonen | (Finland) Koiranen Bros. Motorsport |
| 2008 | Finnish F3 Championship | (Finland) Mika Vähämäki | (Finland) ADRF |
| 2009 | Finnish F3 Championship | (Finland) Kimmo Joutvuo | (Finland) Rolling Rocks |
| 2010 | Nordic F3 Masters | (Finland) Jani Tammi | (Finland) Oakra F3 |

== 2010 season ==
- The calendar consists of five events across Finland and Estonia. The Botniaring round was later cancelled.

| Date | Event | Circuit |
|---|---|---|
| May 14–15 | Rata-SM Kemora | (Finland) Kemora Circuit |
| June 11–12 | Rata-SM Alastaro | (Finland) Alastaro Circuit |
| July 9–10 | Summer Racing 2010 | (Estonia) Audru Ring |
| August 13–14 | Rata-SM Botniaring | (Finland) Botniaring Racing Circuit |
| September 10–11 | Citizen Race Weekend | (Finland) Ahvenisto Race Circuit |

| Pos | Driver | KEM (Finland) | | ALA (Finland) | | PÄR (Estonia) | | BOT (Finland) | | AHV (Finland) | | Pts |
|---|---|---|---|---|---|---|---|---|---|---|---|---|
| 1 | (Finland) Jani Tammi | 1 | 1 | 2 | 2 | 2 | 1 | C | C | 2 | 2 | 175 |
| 2 | (Finland) Jari Koivisto | 3 | 2 | 1 | 6 | | | C | C | 3 | Ret | 87 |
| 3 | (Finland) Risto Tonteri | Ret | 3 | 3 | 4 | 3 | 2 | C | C | DNS | DNS | 82 |
| 4 | (Finland) Kimmo Joutvuo | | | Ret | 1 | DNS | Ret | C | C | 1 | 1 | 75 |
| 5 | (Finland) Timo Pitkäniemi | | | 4 | 5 | | | C | C | 4 | 3 | 56 |
| 6 | (Finland) Pekka Rinne | 2 | Ret | 5 | 3 | | | C | C | | | 48 |
| 7 | (Estonia) Raivo Tamm | | | | | 1 | 3 | C | C | | | 41 |
| | (Finland) Arto Taimi | | | | | | | C | C | WD | WD | |

== See also ==
- Formula Three
