= John Bryant-Meisner =

Swedish racing driver (born 1994)

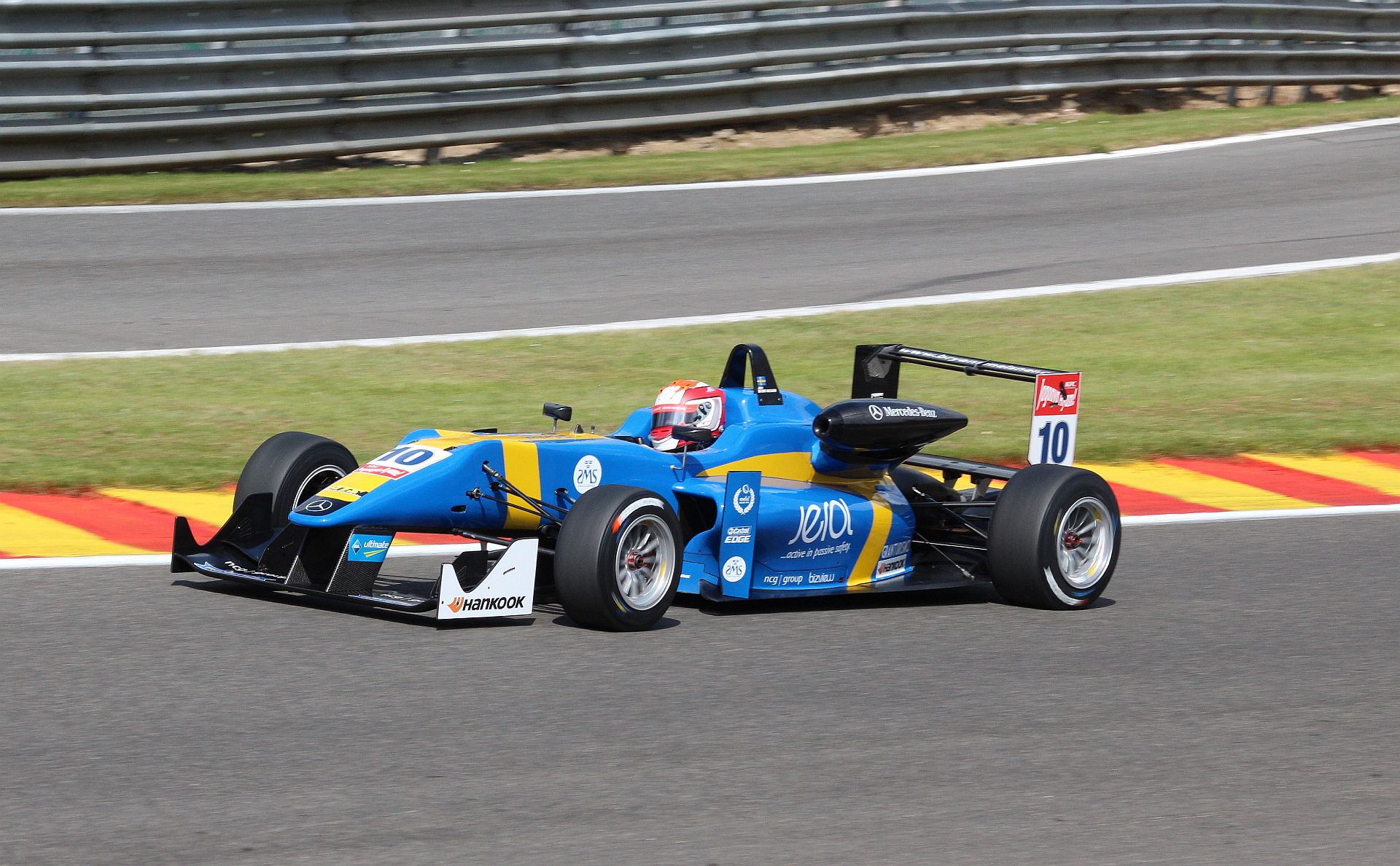
- Nationality: (Sweden) Swedish
- Born: John Hugo Rudolf Bryant-Meisner; 21 September 1994 (age 32) Stockholm, Sweden

FIA European F3 Championship career
- Debut season: 2013
- Current team: Fortec Motorsports
- Categorisation: FIA Silver
- Car number: 10
- Starts: 27
- Wins: 0
- Poles: 0
- Fastest laps: 0
- Best finish: 21st in 2014

Previous series
- 2014 2012-13 2010–2011 2011 2010-11 2010: GP3 Series; German Formula Three; Formula Renault 2.0 NEC; Eurocup Formula Renault 2.0; FR UK Finals Series; Formula Renault 2.0 Sweden

John Hugo Rudolf Bryant-Meisner (born 21 September 1994) is a Swedish racing driver. He currently resides in Solna.

== Career ==
=== Karting ===
Born in Stockholm, Bryant-Meisner began his karting career at age nine. He competed in karting competitions between 2004 and 2009.

=== Formula Renault 2.0 Sweden & Michelin Formula Renault Winter Cup ===
Bryant-Meisner started his single-seater career in 2010 by competing in the Formula Renault 2.0 Sweden for Team BS Motorsport and Michelin Formula Renault Winter Cup driving for the Koiranen GP team. He gained one podium in the Formula Renault 2.0 Sweden series.

=== Formula Renault 2.0 Eurocup & NEC series ===
In 2010 and 2011, Bryant-Meisner also participated in the Formula Renault 2.0 NEC series and in 2011 in Eurocup Formula Renault 2.0, both with Koiranen GP. He gained one podium in the Formula Renault 2.0 NEC series.

=== Protyre Formula Renault UK Finals Series ===
Bryant-Meisner competed in the 2011 Protyre Formula Renault UK Finals Series again with Koiranen GP.

=== German Formula Three Championship ===
2012 saw Bryant-Meisner make his debut in Formula 3, as he signed a deal to race with Swedish outfit Performance Racing in the 2012 German Formula Three season. He scored his maiden podium in the opening round at Zandvoort by finishing third. In May, he crashed his car by hitting a concrete wall during testing. He fractured his vertebrae in his spine and was out for seven months, missing the rest of the season.

Bryant-Meisner returned in the 2013 German Formula Three season still racing for Performance Racing. In the first round, he made successful comeback and convincingly gained his first ever Formula 3 win at Oschersleben. He also won the second race of the second round at Spa.

=== British Formula 3 Championship ===
In 2013, he raced in the British Formula 3 also for Performance Racing as a guest driver. He won two races in the opening round at Silverstone.

=== FIA European Formula 3 Championship ===
In 2013, Bryant-Meisner participated in the 2013 FIA European Formula 3 Championship season last two races, racing for Fortec Motorsport. He managed to score two points by the end of the season.

=== GP3 Series ===
Bryant-Meisner competed in two rounds of the 2014 GP3 Series with Trident, replacing Roman de Beer. He did not score in any of the four races, with a best finish of seventeenth.

== Racing record ==
=== Career summary ===
| Season | Series | Team | Races | Wins | Poles | F/Laps | Podiums | Points | Position |
|---|---|---|---|---|---|---|---|---|---|
| 2010 | Formula Renault 2.0 Sweden | Team BS Motorsport | 14 | 0 | 0 | 0 | 1 | 117 | 5th |
| 2010 | Formula Renault UK Winter Cup | Koiranen GP | 6 | 0 | 0 | 0 | 0 | 36 | 17th |
| 2010 | Formula Renault 2.0 NEC | Koiranen GP | 3 | 0 | 0 | 0 | 0 | 41 | 22nd |
| 2011 | Eurocup Formula Renault 2.0 | Koiranen GP | 14 | 0 | 0 | 0 | 0 | 16 | 15th |
| 2011 | Formula Renault 2.0 NEC | Koiranen GP | 20 | 0 | 0 | 0 | 1 | 224 | 5th |
| 2011 | Protyre Formula Renault UK Finals Series | Koiranen GP | 6 | 0 | 0 | 0 | 0 | 68 | 8th |
| 2012 | German Formula 3 Championship | Performance Racing | 3 | 0 | 0 | 0 | 1 | 24 | 13th |
| 2013 | German Formula 3 Championship | Performance Racing | 26 | 2 | 0 | 0 | 6 | 215 | 5th |
| 2013 | British Formula 3 International Series | Performance Racing | 3 | 2 | 2 | 1 | 2 | 0† | NC† |
| 2013 | FIA European Formula 3 Championship | Fortec Motorsport | 6 | 0 | 0 | 0 | 0 | 2 | 25th |
| 2014 | FIA European Formula 3 Championship | Fortec Motorsports | 21 | 0 | 0 | 0 | 0 | 6 | 21st |
| 2014 | GP3 Series | Trident | 4 | 0 | 0 | 0 | 0 | 0 | 30th |
| 2015–16 | Asian Le Mans Series - CN Class | Atlantic Racing Team | 1 | 0 | 1 | 0 | 1 | 19 | **3rd** |
| 2017 | TCR Scandinavia Touring Car Championship | PWR Racing Junior Team | 2 | 0 | 0 | 0 | 0 | 2 | 22nd |

^{†} As Bryant-Meisner was a guest driver, he was ineligible for points.

=== Complete Formula Renault 2.0 NEC results ===
(key) (Races in bold indicate pole position) (Races in italics indicate fastest lap)

| Year | Entrant | 1 | 2 | 3 | 4 | 5 | 6 | 7 | 8 | 9 | 10 | 11 | 12 | 13 | 14 | 15 | 16 | 17 | 18 | 19 | 20 | DC | Points |
|---|---|---|---|---|---|---|---|---|---|---|---|---|---|---|---|---|---|---|---|---|---|---|---|
| 2010 | Koiranen GP | HOC; 1 | HOC; 2 | BRN; 1 | BRN; 2 | ZAN; 1 | ZAN; 2 | OSC; 1 | OSC; 2 | OSC; 3 | ASS; 1 | ASS; 2 | MST; 1; 13 | MST; 2; 8 | MST; 3; 5 | SPA; 1 | SPA; 2 | SPA; 3 | NÜR; 1 | NÜR; 2 | NÜR; 3 | 22nd | 41 |
| 2011 | Koiranen GP | HOC; 1; 6 | HOC; 2; 10 | **HOC**; **3**; 4 | SPA; 1; 34 | SPA; 2; 14 | NÜR; 1; 11 | NÜR; 2; 11 | ASS; 1 Ret | ASS; 2; 12 | ASS; 3; 11 | OSC; 1; 12 | OSC; 2; 5 | ZAN; 1; 5 | ZAN; 2; 8 | MST; 1; 5 | MST; 2; 8 | MST; 3; 3 | MNZ; 1; 11 | MNZ; 2 Ret | MNZ; 3; 9 | 5th | 224 |

=== Complete Eurocup Formula Renault 2.0 results ===
(key) (Races in bold indicate pole position; races in italics indicate fastest lap)

| Year | Entrant | 1 | 2 | 3 | 4 | 5 | 6 | 7 | 8 | 9 | 10 | 11 | 12 | 13 | 14 | DC | Points |
|---|---|---|---|---|---|---|---|---|---|---|---|---|---|---|---|---|---|
| 2011 | Koiranen GP | ALC; 1; 6 | ALC; 2; 24 | SPA; 1; 34 | SPA; 2; 14 | NÜR; 1; 23 | NÜR; 2 Ret | HUN; 1; 21 | HUN; 2; 21 | SIL; 1; 29 | SIL; 2; 18 | LEC; 1; 20 | LEC; 2; 6 | CAT; 1; 16 | CAT; 2; 13 | 15th | 16 |

=== Complete FIA European Formula 3 Championship results ===
(key)

| Year | Entrant | 1 | 2 | 3 | 4 | 5 | 6 | 7 | 8 | 9 | 10 | 11 | 12 | 13 | 14 | 15 | 16 | 17 | 18 | 19 | 20 | 21 | 22 | 23 | 24 | 25 | 26 | 27 | 28 | 29 | 30 | 31 | 32 | 33 | DC | Points |
|---|---|---|---|---|---|---|---|---|---|---|---|---|---|---|---|---|---|---|---|---|---|---|---|---|---|---|---|---|---|---|---|---|---|---|---|---|
| 2013 | Fortec Motorsports | MNZ; 1 | MNZ; 2 | MNZ; 3 | SIL; 1 | SIL; 2 | SIL; 3 | HOC; 1 | HOC; 2 | HOC; 3 | BRH; 1 | BRH; 2 | BRH; 3 | RBR; 1 | RBR; 2 | RBR; 3 | NOR; 1 | NOR; 2 | NOR; 3 | NÜR; 1 | NÜR; 2 | NÜR; 3 | ZAN; 1 | ZAN; 2 | ZAN; 3 | VAL; 1; 15 | VAL; 2; 10 | VAL; 3; 16 | HOC; 1; 13 | HOC; 2; 14 | HOC; 3 Ret | | | | 25th | 2 |
| 2014 | Fortec Motorsports | SIL; 1; 18 | SIL; 2; 10 | SIL; 3; 11 | HOC; 1; 20 | HOC; 2; 13 | HOC; 3; 19 | PAU; 1; 12 | PAU; 2; 11 | PAU; 3; 8 | HUN; 1; 14 | HUN; 2; 10 | HUN; 3; 12 | SPA; 1; 14 | SPA; 2; 18 | SPA; 3; 23† | NOR; 1; 15 | NOR; 2; 13 | NOR; 3; 15 | MSC; 1 | MSC; 2 | MSC; 3 | RBR; 1; 20 | RBR; 2; 11 | RBR; 3 Ret | NÜR; 1 | NÜR; 2 | NÜR; 3 | IMO; 1 | IMO; 2 | IMO; 3 | HOC; 1 | HOC; 2 | HOC; 3 | 21st | 6 |

^{†} Driver did not finish the race, but was classified as he completed over 90% of the race distance.

=== Complete GP3 Series results ===
(key) (Races in bold indicate pole position) (Races in italics indicate fastest lap)

| Year | Entrant | 1 | 2 | 3 | 4 | 5 | 6 | 7 | 8 | 9 | 10 | 11 | 12 | 13 | 14 | 15 | 16 | 17 | 18 | Pos | Points |
|---|---|---|---|---|---|---|---|---|---|---|---|---|---|---|---|---|---|---|---|---|---|
| 2014 | Trident | CAT; FEA | CAT; SPR | RBR; FEA | RBR; SPR | SIL; FEA | SIL; SPR | HOC; FEA | HOC; SPR | HUN; FEA | HUN; SPR | SPA; FEA; 20† | SPA; SPR; 22 | MNZ; FEA; 17 | MNZ; SPR; 17 | SOC; FEA | SOC; SPR | YMC; FEA | YMC; SPR | 30th | 0 |

^{†} Driver did not finish the race, but was classified as he completed over 90% of the race distance.
