= 2002 Formula Renault seasons =

2002 Formula Renault

Seasons
- ← 2001 2003 →

Following are the results of the 2002 Formula Renault season. Formula Renault is a class of formula racing founded in 1971. Regarded as an entry-level series to motor racing, it is a respected series where drivers can learn advanced racecraft before moving on to Formula Three, World Series by Renault, GP2 or Formula One.

== Other Formats ==
- Formula Renault 3.5L
- Formula Renault 2000 Eurocup

=== 2002 Formula Renault 2000 Scandinavia season ===
Pos	Driver	R1	R2	R3	R4	R5	R6	R7	R8	R9	R10	R11	R12	R13	R14	R15	R16	Points
1	(Denmark) Philip Andersen	1	1	1	1	1	1	1	1	1	1	1	1	Ret	Ret	1	6	281
2	(Denmark) Claus Madsen	2	7	2	2	3	9	4	2	3	6	5	6	2	4	3	3	168
3	(Denmark) Tommy Jespersen	3	5	3	3	2	3	6	3	6	2	3	2	9	10	Ret	5	152
4	(Denmark) Jacob Ludvigsen	Ret	3	7	7	6	2	7	6	2	4	2	3	3	5	Ret	5	137
5	(Denmark) Mads Bo Nielsen	7	Ret	6	Ret	7	6	2	5	7	7	4	Ret	7	2	6	1	106
6	(Denmark) Tom Pedersen	5	2	5	4	5	5	Ret	4	5	3	7	Ret	5	9	Ret	Ret	104
7	(Denmark) Dennis Wounlund	4	4	4	5	4	10	5	7	8	Ret	6	4	7	Ret	5	6	98
8	(Denmark) Jesper Wulff Laursen	Ret	Ret	8	Ret	Ret	7	10	Ret	9	8	8	5	4	1	2	2	85
9	(Sweden) Jimmy Jacobsson	Ret	Ret	9	6	Ret	Ret	3	Ret	4	5	Ret	Ret	1	3	Ret	Ret	71
10	(Denmark) Peter Ager	Ret	Ret	Ret	9	10	8	8	10	Ret	9	8	6	6	4	3	9	42
11	(Denmark) Jens Renstrup	Ret	Ret	Ret	8	8	4	Ret	10	Ret	Ret	Ret	7	Ret	7	Ret	10	28
12	(Denmark) Dennis Holbæk Pedersen	8	Ret	10	10	9	Ret	Ret	9	Ret	9	Ret	10	Ret	10	Ret	Ret	13
13	(Denmark) Jason Workman	6	8															12
14	(Denmark) Niels Dyhr	Ret	Ret	Ret	Ret	Ret	Ret	9	Ret	Ret	10	10	9	10	9	Ret	Ret	9

Colour	Result
Gold	Winner
Silver	2nd place
Bronze	3rd place
Green	Finished, in points
Green	Retired, in points
Blue	Finished, no points
Purple	Did not finish (Ret)
Purple	Not classified (NC)
Red	Did not qualify (DNQ)
Black	Disqualified (DSQ)
White	Did not start (DNS)
White	Withdrew (WD)
Blank	Did not participate
Blank	Injured (INJ)
Blank	Excluded (EX)
**Bold**	Pole position
*	Fastest lap
spr	Sprint Race
fea	Feature Race
