= Harry Tincknell =

British racing driver

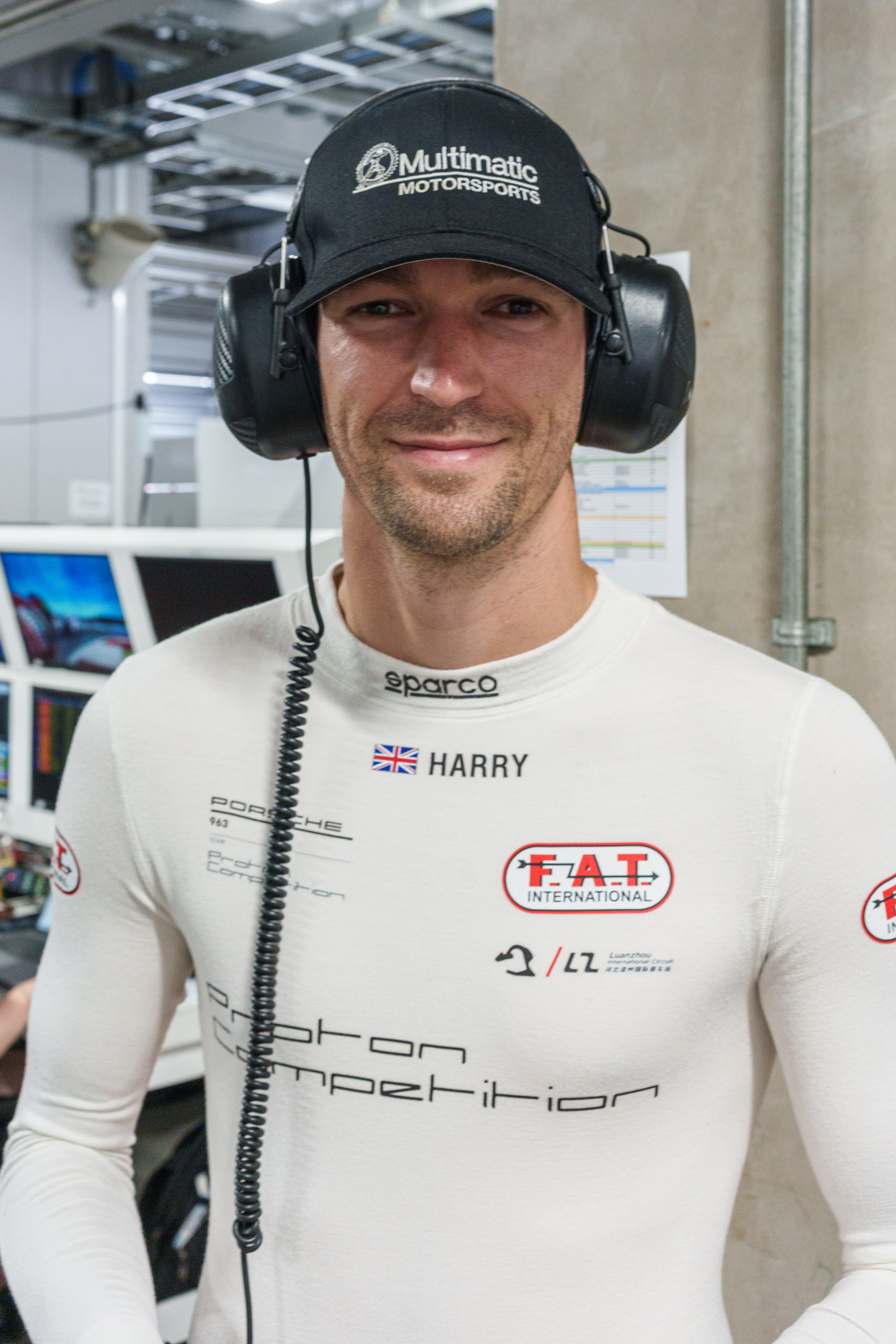
- Tincknell in 2024
- Nationality: (United Kingdom) British
- Born: Harry William Tincknell; 29 October 1991 (age 35) Exeter, England

FIA World Endurance Championship career
- Debut season: 2014
- Current team: Aston Martin THOR Team
- Categorisation: FIA Gold (until 2015); FIA Platinum (2016–)
- Car number: 007
- Former teams: Proton Competition, Nissan Motorsports, Jota Sport, Ford Chip Ganassi Racing UK, Aston Martin Racing
- Starts: 65
- Wins: 9
- Poles: 4
- Fastest laps: 3
- Best finish: 3rd in 2017

Previous series
- 2014–15 2014–15 2013 2011–12 2009–10 2009 2008–09 2008: FIA WEC; European Le Mans Series; FIA European Formula 3 Championship; British Formula 3 Championship; Formula Renault UK; Formula Renault 2.0 NEC; FRUK Winter Series; FR2.0 Portugal Winter Series

Championship titles
- 2016 2009 2009: European Le Mans Series; FRUK Winter Series; FRUK Graduate Cup
24 Hours of Le Mans career
- Years: 2014 -
- Teams: Ford Racing (2016); Nissan Motorsports (2015); Jota Sport (2014)
- Class wins: 2

Harry William Tincknell (born 29 October 1991 in Exeter, Devon) is a British professional racing driver currently racing in the FIA World Endurance Championship for Aston Martin THOR Team. He won the LMP2 class on his Le Mans 24 Hour race debut in 2014 and again in LMGTE Pro in 2020, the first driver in the race's history to win in both LMP2 and LMGTE Pro. Other notable victories include the 2016 European Le Mans Series title and the overall win at the 2020 12 Hours of Sebring.

== Career ==
=== Karting ===
Tincknell made his karting début in 2001, finishing in the top five of both the Dunkeswell Club Championship and the South West British Championship series. After competing in Cadets in 2002, Tincknell moved up to TKM karts in 2003, winning the Winter Series at the Shenington kart circuit in Oxfordshire. He continued at that level in 2004, winning a round at Larkhall and finished in 27th place in the championship for Connaught Racing. Tincknell moved into the ICA Junior Belgian Championship in 2005, and finished in fifth position in the championship, 65 points behind champion Laurens Vanthoor.

Tincknell stayed at ICA Junior level for the 2006 season, competing in the WSK International Series. He finished fourteenth in the championship, despite earning a third-place finish at La Conca, Italy. Tincknell frequented in various series in 2007, competing in no less than eight different championships or trophy races during the season. His best result was fourth in the South Garda Winter Cup, finishing behind Yannick de Brabander, António Félix da Costa and Robin Frijns. 2008 was Tincknell's final season in karting, and he finished as runner-up in the Euro Rotax Max Challenge.

=== Formula Renault ===
Tincknell moved into the Formula Renault UK Winter Series in 2008 and finished seventh with points-scoring finishes in each of the four races with CR Scuderia. He also contested two races of the Fórmula Júnior Portugal Winter Series, finishing in sixth and eighth places during the two races in Estoril. In 2009, Tincknell remained with the newly renamed CRS Racing, to contest a full season of Formula Renault UK. He started well, setting the first pole position of the season at Brands Hatch before finishing behind Oliver Webb in the first race. Further podiums came at Thruxton, Oulton Park and Rockingham as Tincknell finished fifth overall in the championship standings. His consistent finishing also earned him the Graduate Cup title, where first-year drivers battle for honours, with the best fifteen finishes for each drivers counting towards the championship. At the conclusion of the season, Tincknell dominated the Winter Series, finishing each of the four races on the podium and winning two of them. He also contested a round of the Formula Renault 2.0 Northern European Cup at Oschersleben, finishing both races in seventeenth place.

Tincknell continued in the series in 2010, leading a four-car challenge from CRS Racing. Tincknell was also confirmed as one of ten drivers selected by the UK's motorsport governing body, the Motor Sports Association, to take part in its driver development programme, Team UK. Considered to be the top-ten most promising young racing drivers in the UK, each member of the team received in-car performance, fitness and nutrition training as well as advanced sports psychology, care of the Brabham Performance Clinic, created by David Brabham.

Tincknell started the 2010 season off well with five podiums and a one win in the first eight races of the season at Thruxton, Rockingham, Brands Hatch and Oulton Park. After a difficult weekend at the Croft circuit, he bounced back to take a pole position and victory at Snetterton breaking the lap record which still stands on the way to the win. However, the final four rounds of the season proved a struggle for the team with the new Formula Renault car and Tincknell managed one more podium and three top-five places to eventually finish fifth overall in the championship.

At the start of 2010, Tincknell was also invited to become to part of the British Racing Drivers' Club Rising Stars programme. He was also confirmed as one of ten drivers selected by the UK's motorsport governing body, the Motor Sports Association, to take part in its driver development programme, Team UK. Considered to be the top-ten most promising young racing drivers in the UK, each member of the team received in-car performance, fitness and nutrition training as well as advanced sports psychology, care of the Brabham Performance Clinic, created by David Brabham.

=== British Formula Three ===
Tincknell celebrates victory at Brands Hatch in 2011

Tincknell signed with Fortec Motorsport to race in the British Formula 3 Championship in 2011. After a tough start to the year at Monza, he claimed in his first F3 podium at Oulton Park at the second race of the season before going on to finish second at the next round at Snetterton. At the following round at Brands Hatch Grand Prix Circuit, Tincknell took his first win of his Formula Three career leading the race from pole position. He claimed his fourth podium of the season at the Nurburgring, Germany. After starting in eighth position, Tincknell made an astonishing start to make up five places on the way down to the first corner and ended the race in third position. After a good start to the season, Tincknell finished the championship in 11th position with one win and four podiums.

After the end of the 2011 season, Tincknell signed for multiple British F3 Champion team Carlin. After impressing in initial testing Tincknell suffered a freak accident at the Circuit de Spa-Francorchamps in Belgium, breaking his right hand severely which needed to be operated on back in the UK. This put him out of action for the rest of the year.

In 2012, Tincknell returned to the British Formula 3 Championship and took his first podium at the first round of the year at Oulton Park. Two DNFs followed at Monza and Pau before Tincknell got his season back on track winning at Rockingham on the championships return to the UK. Tincknell then scored another third place and fastest lap at Brands Hatch before the championship combined with the Formula Three Euroseries meeting at Norisring. Tincknell took eighth overall and third place in British F3 in race one before scoring a lights to flag victory in race two, his first European win in car racing. He then scored another dominant win at the Snetterton Circuit and ended the year in good style with two third places at Silverstone and another win at Donington Park in the season Finale. He finished fifth overall in the Championship with four wins and nine podiums. He also contested the 2012 Historic Pau Grand Prix in a 1965 Lotus 20 in the Formula Junior category finishing second in both races.

Tincknell returned to his former F3 team, Fortec Motorsport for the prestigious Macau Grand Prix in November 2012. On his debut at the notoriously difficult Guia Circuit, Tincknell had an outstanding weekend, qualifying seventh overall and finishing sixth in the Qualification race in the 30 strong world class field. Tincknell had a great start in the final to move up to fourth position but after encountering a mechanical issue during the race, finished ninth.

=== FIA Formula 3 European Championship ===
At the beginning of 2013, Tincknell extended his deal with multiple Championship winning team, Carlin Motorsport, for the 2013 season of the FIA European Formula Three Championship. The five-time Formula Three race winner continued his relationship with the team and has been joined by Canadian racer Nicholas Latifi and British rookies Jann Mardenborough and Jordan King.

Tincknell emerged from the first rounds of the FIA Formula 3 European Championship at the Autodromo di Monza in third place in the points table after a dramatic opening weekend to the season with the final two races taking place in treacherous conditions.

Tincknell then scored an emotional win at Silverstone from a double pole position. It was the first time the 21-year-old from Devon has scored maximum points in the championship and was also a landmark victory for the Carlin team that runs his Volkswagen-powered Dallara – it was the squad's first-ever success in a non-reversed-grid race on the series' control Hankook tyres.

With the win at Silverstone, Tincknell became the first Briton to win a round of the FIA F3 European Championship, revived in 2012 after a 29-year break, since ex-Lotus Formula 1 driver and Jaguar Le Mans winner Johnny Dumfries. It was also the first time Tincknell topped qualifying in his F3 career. Tincknell remained in third position in the Championship.

Tincknell then had a tough weekend in the third round of the series at Hockenheim, finishing the weekend with a strong fifth-place finish but slipping to fifth in the Championship.

Tincknell claimed his second FIA Formula 3 European Championship podium finish of the season after a strong performance in the latest round at Brands Hatch on 18–19 May 2013. Tincknell was third on the road in the third and final race of the weekend, but was moved up to second place when race winner Raffaele Marciello was excluded for a technical infringement.

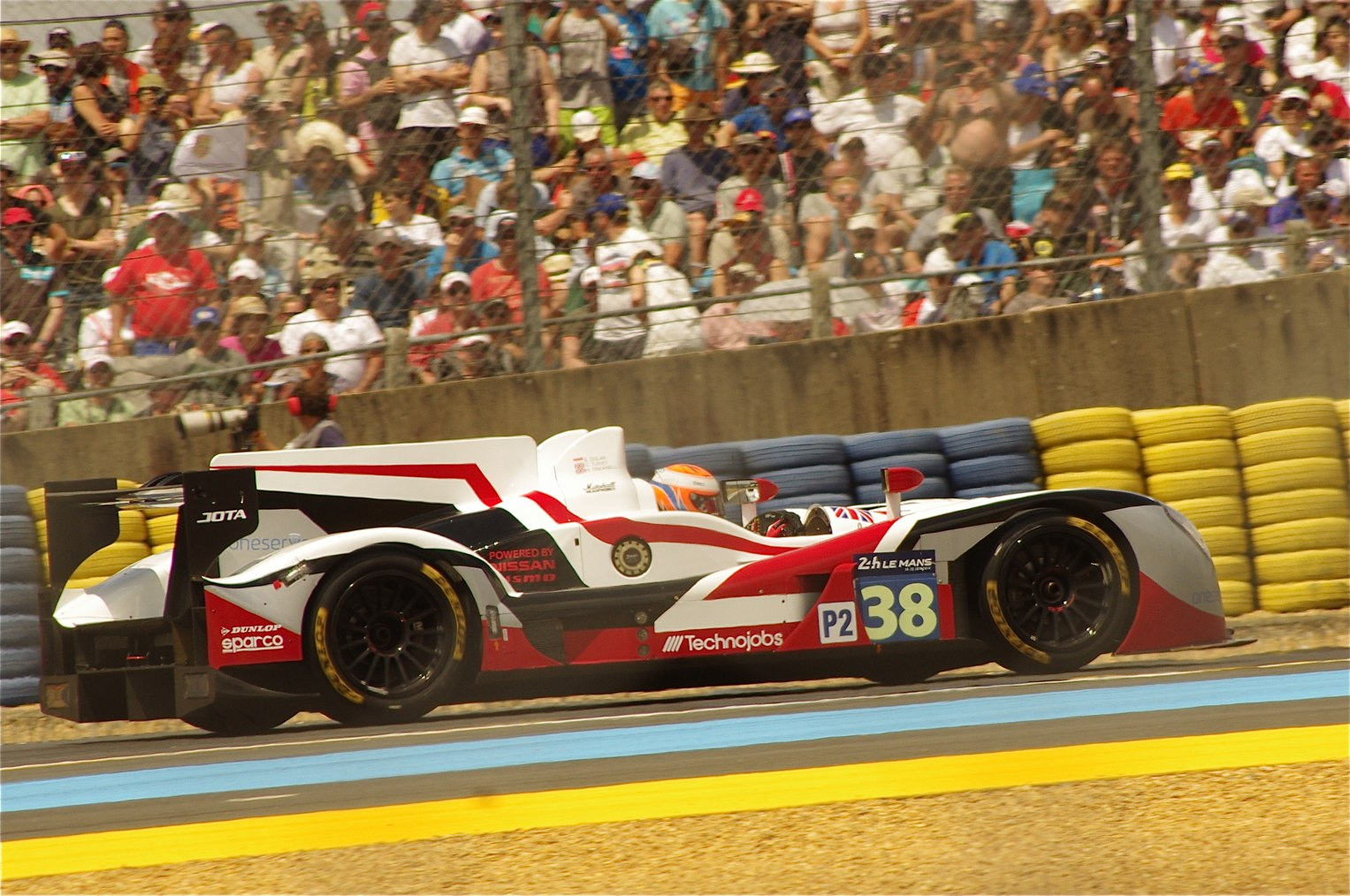
Tincknell made his Le Mans debut in 2014 taking the LMP2 class win.

=== European Le Mans Series ===
In 2014, Tincknell switched from single seaters to sportscars. He signed with JOTA Sport to race a Zytek Z11SN-Nissan in the European Le Mans Series and finished second in the 2014 ELMS Driver's Championship (74 points total) with Simon Dolan and Filipe Albuquerque after one win, three podiums and three personal poles. He was ELMS “Rookie of the Year” and also won the BRDC Woolf Barnato Trophy.

In 2015, Tincknell re-signed with the British Jota Sport outfit in when the factory Nissan NISMO LM P1 team opted to delay its race programme. He subsequently finished third in the ELMS Driver's Championship (89 points total) driving a Gibson 015S-Nissan (formerly designated the Zytek Z11SN-Nissan) with Dolan and Albuquerque again in the five-race series, after one win, four podiums, two personal poles, three front row starts and two fastest race laps.

In 2016, Tincknell returned to the European Le Mans Series with Jota Sport (rebranded G-Drive Racing) Gibson-Nissan, teaming up once again with Simon Dolan and new signing Giedo van der Garde. He won the ELMS Driver's Championship with two wins and four podiums, taking a dramatic victory at the Estoril circuit in Portugal to clinch the title by seven points.

=== FIA World Endurance Championship ===
Tincknell contested two FIA World Endurance Championship races in 2014—both with his ELMS team Jota Sport. He finished 2nd (LM P2) in the Six Hours of Spa-Francorchamps and then won LM P2 on his Le Mans 24 Hour race début finishing 5th overall in the Zytek Z11SN-Nissan.

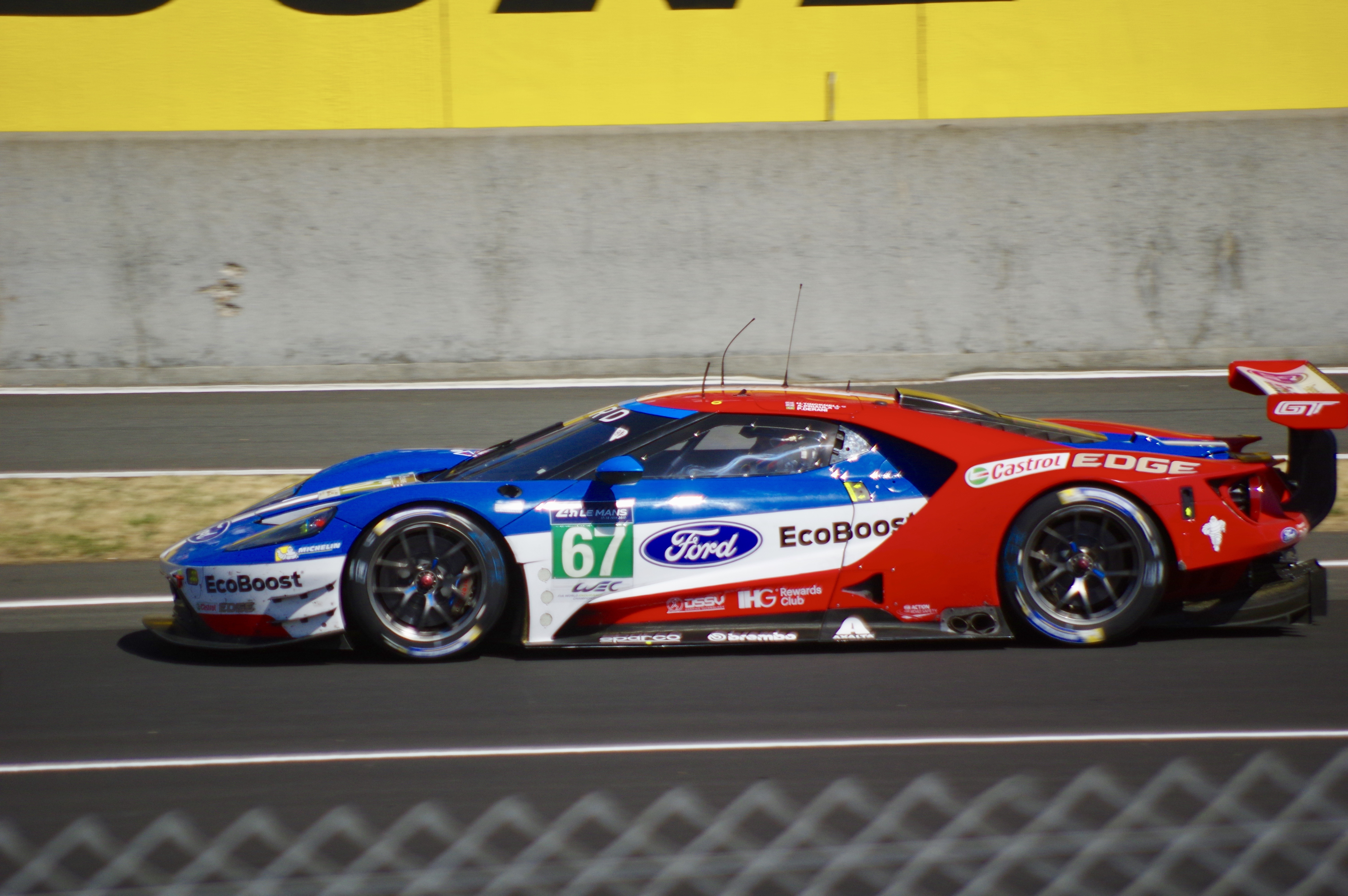
Tincknell competing at the 2017 24 Hours of Le Mans.

In 2015, Tincknell was announced as a factory Nissan NISMO LMP1 WEC race and development driver. When the race programme was delayed, Tincknell competed in the Six Hours of Spa-Francorchamps with Jota Sport once again and won—setting the fastest time in the LMP2 class.

Tincknell ultimately made his LMP1 race début in the Nissan GT-R LM Nismo in the Le Mans 24 Hours—the team's only race of the FIA World Endurance Championship season that year. He set the fastest lap time for Nissan in qualifying and again in the race itself. After extensive testing during the summer of 2016, Nissan cancelled their LMP1 program in December.

In March 2016, Tincknell was confirmed as one of the factory drivers to co-drive the all-new Ford GT LM GTE with Ford Chip Ganassi Racing Team UK in the FIA World Endurance Championship and also for the Le Mans 24 Hours. Alongside teammates Andy Priaulx and Marino Franchitti, he finished fifth in the Driver's Championship, winning the Fuji and Shanghai rounds alongside Priaulx. At the Le Mans 24 hours, the car suffered a gearbox problem before the start of the race, ultimately finishing ninth.

Tincknell driving at the 2022 24 Hours of Le Mans.

In 2017, Tincknell returned to the FIA World Endurance Championship with Ford Chip Ganassi Racing Team UK with Andy Priaulx and new Ford signing Pipo Derani. The trio won the opening round at Silverstone, UK and finished second at the 24 Hours of Le Mans. Tinckell and Priaulx would take a further victory in Shanghai and podium in Bahrain en route to third in the drivers championship.

During the first round of 2018–19 season, Tincknell had a major accident at the Six Hours of Spa race after a front end mechanical failure caused a head on impact with the tyre barrier at the famous Eau Rouge corner. Despite a 29G impact, he was unharmed. At Le Mans, he and Priaulx were joined by Indy 500 winner Tony Kanaan. The trio finished fourth but a post race penalty demoted them to ninth. Podiums at Fuji and Sebring were followed with fourth at the 2019 24 Hours of Le Mans, this time partnered by Jonathan Bomarito.

Tincknell joined Aston Martin Racing in the No. 97 Vantage for the 2020 24 Hours of Le Mans. Alongside fellow Brit Alex Lynn and Belgian Maxime Martin, the trio won the GTE Pro class by 1 minute 33 seconds.

For 2022, Tincknell joined the Dempsey-Proton Racing team alongside fellow Brit Sebastian Priaulx and German Christian Ried. The trio won both Spa and Monza in the LMGTE Am Class. The team came sixth in the overall drivers standings, and fourth in the Teams Endurance Trophy.

In 2023, Tincknell stayed with the Proton Competition team, racing in LMGTE Am, until the team's customer Porsche 963 wasn't ready. In the LMGTE Am class, he was partnered with American Ryan Hardwick, and Canadian Zacharie Robichon for the first three rounds, while for the 2023 24 Hours of Le Mans he was partnered with German Jonas Ried and American Don Yount. The car would retire after an incident with the 22 United Autosports LMP2. At the 2023 6 Hours of Monza, the teams Porsche 963 would be ready for the team to use, He would drive it with Italian Gianmaria Bruni and Swiss driver Neel Jani, for the final three events of the season, they would get a highest position of ninth at Fuji.

In 2024, Tincknell would stay with Proton, in their Porsche 963, partnered by French driver Julien Andlauer and once again Neel Jani. He would miss both races in Spa and São Paulo, due to IMSA commitments. The best finish when he was racing for the team was ninth at the season opening 2024 Qatar 1812 km. At the 2024 24 Hours of Le Mans, the team would have to pit 50 minutes into the race to adjust the door closing mechanism. Then with under three hours of the race left, the car would have to go into the pits with an electrical failure for about two hours. The would finish the race, 45th overall (16th in Class) 60 laps down on the winner. He would end up finishing the season 30th in the drivers championship, while the team would come fourth in the team's Hypercar World Cup.

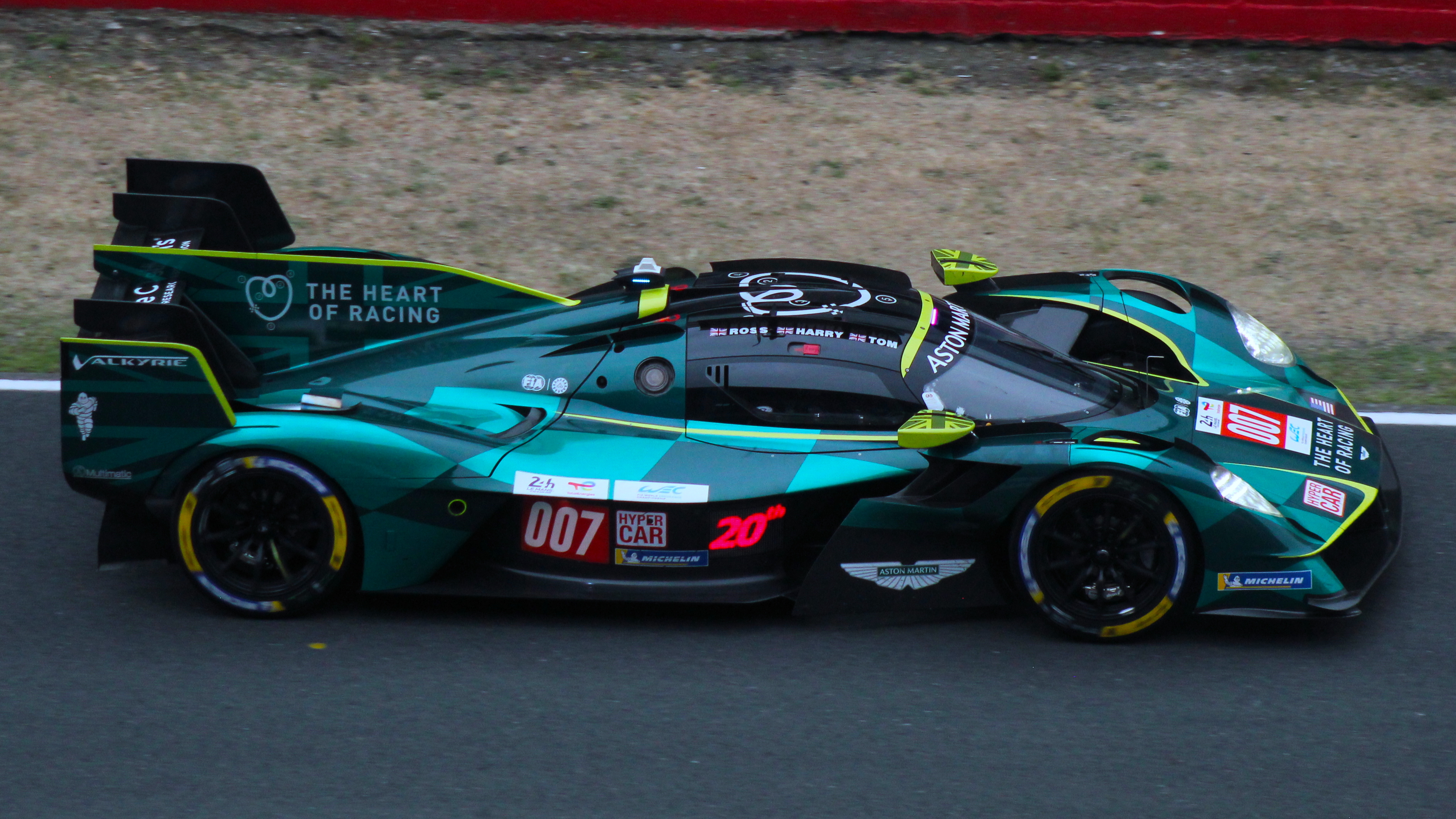
Tincknell's No. 007 car at the 2025 24 Hours of Le Mans

For 2025, Tincknell raced once again for Aston Martin, this time in their new Valkyrie AMR-LMH for the Aston Martin THOR Team in the No. 007 car.

=== Formula E ===
In August 2016, Tincknell was listed among four drivers who would drive for Jaguar in the pre-season test at Donington Park.

In 2017, Tincknell tested for the NIO Formula E Team, going on to drive at the inaugural Formula E Rookie test in Marrakech and signed as their Simulation Development Driver in 2018.

In 2019, TIncknell returned to the Marrakesh Rookie test with Jaguar.

=== IMSA ===
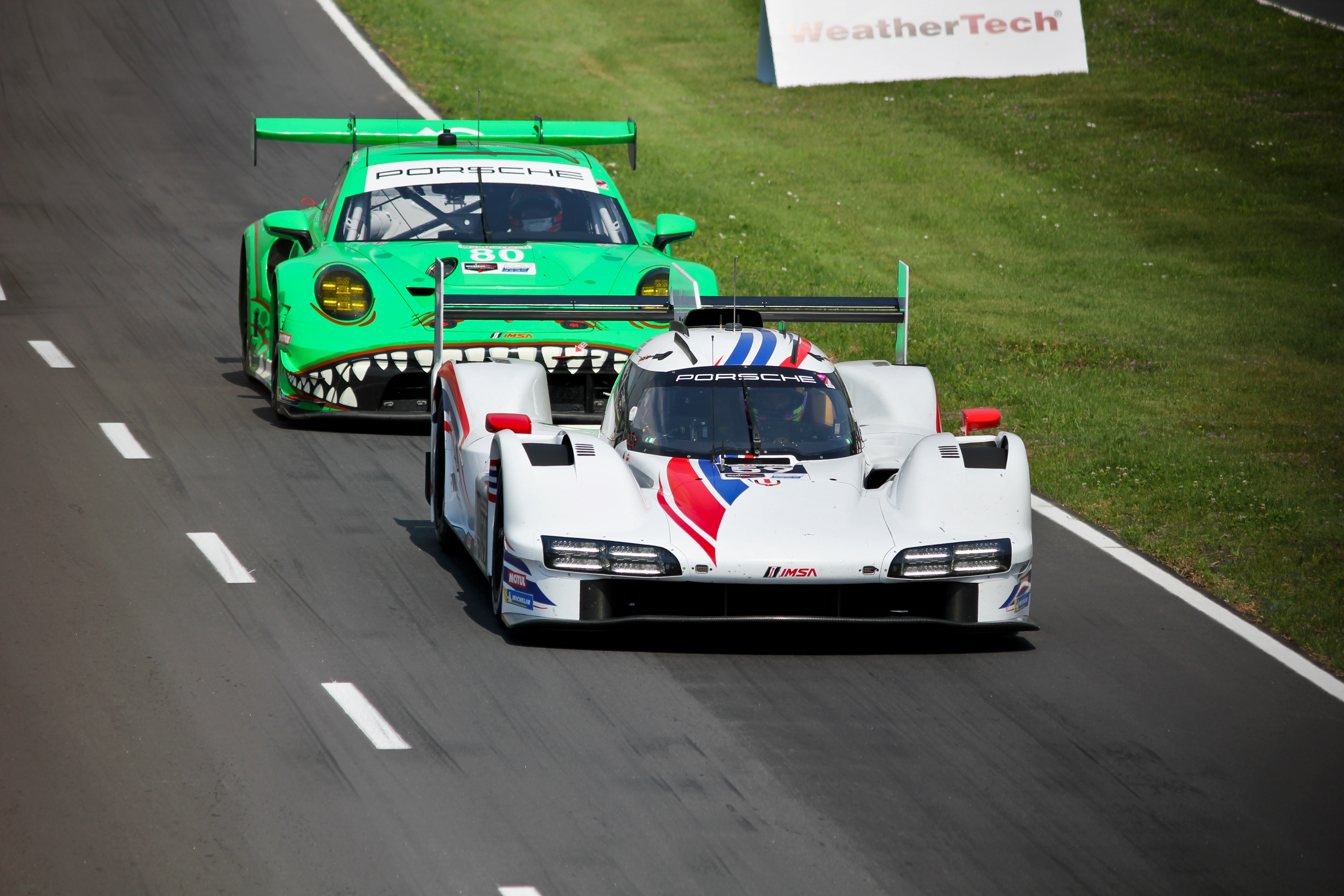
Tincknell leading Sebastian Priaulx at Road America during the 2023 IMSA SportsCar Weekend.

Tincknell signed with Mazda Team Joest for the 2018 and 2019 IMSA WeatherTech Sportscar Championship seasons. He scored Mazda's first win in seven years at the 2019 6 Hours of Watkins Glen and won again at Road America alongside teammate Jonathan Bomarito. They also finished on the podium at Mosport having led the majority of the race, but an issue fitting the right rear tyre in the final pit stop dropped them to second.

In 2020, Tincknell signed a long-term deal with Multimatic which would keep him in IMSA with Mazda for at least the 2020 and 2021 seasons. Following postponements due to COVID-19 pandemic, Tincknell and Bomarito won the Daytona 240 race and teamed up with IndyCar Champion Ryan Hunter-Reay to finish second at the 6 Hours of Road Atlanta and win the 12 Hours of Sebring. The win at Sebring helped them secure third overall in the drivers championship.

In 2021, Tincknell would continue to drive for Multimatic Motorsports in the No. 55 Mazda, alongside Oliver Jarvis and Jonathan Bomarito. The team, would win at both Watkins Glen and Road Atlanta helping them get third in the drivers championship.

In 2022, Tincknell would do the Rolex 24 with PR1/Mathiasen Motorsports, alongside Ex-Mazda teammate Jonathan Bomarito, Steven Thomas and Josh Pierson. The team would come second in the qualifying race and end up DNF'ing with a Mechanical after 663 laps.

In 2023, Tincknell ran that years Rolex 24 in the AO Racing Team car, finishing 14th in class. Alongside this, he also ran some races in the Proton Porsche 963, the team had a best finish of third at Road Atlanta.

In 2024, Tincknell ran the full season in the Ford Mustang GT3 alongside Christopher Mies and Mike Rockenfeller, the team scored two podiums at VIR and Indianapolis, and finished sixth in the GTD Pro rankings.

== Racing record ==
=== Career summary ===
| Season | Series | Team | Races | Wins | Poles | F/Laps | Podiums | Points | Position |
|---|---|---|---|---|---|---|---|---|---|
| 2008 | Formula Renault UK Winter Cup | CR Scuderia | 4 | 0 | 0 | 0 | 0 | 56 | 7th |
| 2008 | Portuguese Formula Renault 2.0 Winter Series | CR Scuderia | 2 | 0 | 0 | 0 | 0 | 8 | 13th |
| 2009 | Formula Renault UK | CRS Racing | 19 | 0 | 1 | 2 | 4 | 323 | 5th |
| 2009 | Formula Renault 2.0 NEC | CRS Racing | 2 | 0 | 0 | 0 | 0 | 8 | 33rd |
| 2009 | Formula Renault UK Winter Series | CRS Racing | 4 | 2 | 4 | 1 | 4 | 119 | **1st** |
| 2010 | Formula Renault UK | CRS Racing | 20 | 2 | 2 | 1 | 7 | 375 | 5th |
| 2011 | British Formula 3 Championship | Fortec Motorsport | 30 | 1 | 0 | 0 | 4 | 78 | 11th |
| 2012 | British Formula 3 Championship | Carlin | 28 | 4 | 0 | 1 | 9 | 226 | 5th |
| 2012 | FIA Formula 3 European Championship | Carlin | 8 | 0 | 0 | 0 | 0 | 0 | NC† |
| 2012 | Macau Grand Prix | Fortec Motorsports | 1 | 0 | 0 | 0 | 0 | N/A | 9th |
| 2013 | FIA Formula 3 European Championship | Carlin | 30 | 1 | 2 | 0 | 2 | 227 | 5th |
| 2013-14 | MRF Challenge Formula 2000 Championship | MRF Racing | 13 | 0 | 0 | 0 | 3 | 111 | 5th |
| 2014 | European Le Mans Series - LMP2 | Jota Sport | 5 | 1 | 4 | 0 | 3 | 74 | **2nd** |
| 2014 | FIA World Endurance Championship - LMP2 | Jota Sport | 2 | 1 | 0 | 0 | 2 | 0 | NC† |
| 2014 | 24 Hours of Le Mans - LMP2 | Jota Sport | 1 | 1 | 0 | 0 | 1 | N/A | **1st** |
| 2015 | European Le Mans Series - LMP2 | Jota Sport | 5 | 1 | 4 | 2 | 4 | 89 | **3rd** |
| 2015 | FIA World Endurance Championship - LMP2 | Jota Sport | 1 | 1 | 0 | 1 | 1 | 0 | NC† |
| 2015 | FIA World Endurance Championship | Nissan Motorsports | 1 | 0 | 0 | 0 | 0 | 0 | 34th |
| 2015 | 24 Hours of Le Mans | Nissan Motorsports | 1 | 0 | 0 | 0 | 0 | N/A | NC |
| 2015 | Blancpain Endurance Series - Pro-Am | Nissan GT Academy Team RJN | 1 | 0 | 1 | 0 | 0 | 0 | NC |
| 2016 | European Le Mans Series - LMP2 | G-Drive Racing | 6 | 2 | 0 | 0 | 4 | 103 | **1st** |
| 2016 | FIA World Endurance Championship - LMGTE Pro | Ford Chip Ganassi Team UK | 9 | 2 | 1 | 1 | 3 | 117.5 | 5th |
| 2016 | 24 Hours of Le Mans - LMGTE Pro | Ford Chip Ganassi Team UK | 1 | 0 | 0 | 0 | 0 | N/A | 9th |
| 2016–17 | Formula E | Panasonic Jaguar Racing | Test driver | | | | | | |
| 2017 | FIA World Endurance Championship - LMGTE Pro | Ford Chip Ganassi Team UK | 9 | 2 | 1 | 0 | 4 | 142.5 | **3rd** |
| 2017 | 24 Hours of Le Mans - LMGTE Pro | Ford Chip Ganassi Team UK | 1 | 0 | 0 | 0 | 1 | N/A | **2nd** |
| 2017 | IMSA SportsCar Championship - GTLM | Ford Chip Ganassi Team UK | 1 | 0 | 0 | 0 | 0 | 26 | 23rd |
| 2018 | IMSA SportsCar Championship - Prototype | Mazda Team Joest | 8 | 0 | 0 | 0 | 0 | 171 | 17th |
| 2018 | 24 Hours of Le Mans - LMGTE Pro | Ford Chip Ganassi Team UK | 1 | 0 | 0 | 0 | 0 | N/A | 12th |
| 2018–19 | FIA World Endurance Championship - LMGTE Pro | Ford Chip Ganassi Team UK | 8 | 0 | 2 | 1 | 4 | 90 | 4th |
| 2019 | IMSA SportsCar Championship - DPi | Mazda Team Joest | 9 | 2 | 1 | 2 | 3 | 233 | 9th |
| 2019 | European Le Mans Series - LMP2 | Thunderhead Carlin Racing | 4 | 0 | 0 | 0 | 0 | 2.5 | 27th |
| 2019 | 24 Hours of Le Mans - LMGTE Pro | Ford Chip Ganassi Team UK | 1 | 0 | 0 | 0 | 0 | N/A | 4th |
| 2019–20 | Asian Le Mans Series - LMP2 | Thunderhead Carlin Racing | 4 | 2 | 2 | 1 | 4 | 82 | **2nd** |
| 2019–20 | FIA World Endurance Championship - LMGTE Pro | Aston Martin Racing | 1 | 1 | 0 | 0 | 1 | 50 | 9th |
| 2020 | IMSA SportsCar Championship - DPi | Mazda Team Joest | 1 | 0 | 0 | 0 | 0 | 260 | **3rd** |
| 2020 | IMSA SportsCar Championship - DPi | Mazda Motorsports | 8 | 2 | 0 | 1 | 3 | 260 | **3rd** |
| 2020 | 24 Hours of Le Mans - LMGTE Pro | Aston Martin Racing | 1 | 1 | 0 | 0 | 1 | N/A | **1st** |
| 2020–21 | Formula E | Audi Sport ABT Schaeffler | Reserve driver | | | | | | |
| 2021 | IMSA SportsCar Championship - DPi | Mazda Motorsports | 11 | 2 | 3 | 1 | 7 | 3264 | **3rd** |
| 2021 | European Le Mans Series - LMP2 | Racing Team Turkey | 3 | 0 | 0 | 0 | 0 | 8.5 | 24th |
| 2022 | FIA World Endurance Championship - LMGTE Am | Dempsey-Proton Racing | 6 | 2 | 1 | 0 | 2 | 83 | 4th |
| 2022 | 24 Hours of Le Mans - LMGTE Am | Dempsey-Proton Racing | 1 | 0 | 0 | 0 | 0 | N/A | 14th |
| 2022 | IMSA SportsCar Championship - LMP2 | PR1/Mathiasen Motorsports | 1 | 0 | 0 | 0 | 0 | 0 | NC† |
| 2023 | FIA World Endurance Championship - Hypercar | Proton Competition | 3 | 0 | 0 | 0 | 0 | 4 | 20th |
| 2023 | FIA World Endurance Championship - LMGTE Am | Proton Competition | 3 | 0 | 0 | 0 | 0 | 14 | 22nd |
| 2023 | IMSA SportsCar Championship - GTP | Proton Competition | 3 | 0 | 0 | 0 | 1 | 814 | 15th |
| 2023 | 24 Hours of Le Mans - LMGTE Am | Proton Competition | 1 | 0 | 0 | 0 | 0 | N/A | DNF |
| 2023 | IMSA SportsCar Championship - GTD | AO Racing Team | 1 | 0 | 0 | 0 | 0 | 182 | 62nd |
| 2023–24 | Asian Le Mans Series - LMP2 | Proton Competition | 5 | 0 | 1 | 0 | 0 | 30 | 9th |
| 2024 | FIA World Endurance Championship - Hypercar | Proton Competition | 6 | 0 | 0 | 0 | 0 | 3 | 30th |
| 2024 | IMSA SportsCar Championship - GTD Pro | Ford Multimatic Motorsports | 10 | 0 | 0 | 1 | 2 | 2783 | 6th |
| 2025 | FIA World Endurance Championship - Hypercar | Aston Martin THOR Team | 8 | 0 | 0 | 0 | 0 | 0 | 30th |
| 2025 | IMSA SportsCar Championship - GTD | Gradient Racing | 1 | 0 | 0 | 0 | 0 | 154 | 85th |
| 2026 | IMSA SportsCar Championship - LMP2 | Bryan Herta Autosport with PR1/Mathiasen | 6 | 0 | 1 | 0 | 1 | 1709 | 12th |
| 2026 | FIA World Endurance Championship - Hypercar | Aston Martin THOR Team | 8 | 0 | 0 | 0 | 0 | 42 | 16th |

^{†} As Tincknell was a guest driver, he was ineligible to score points.

=== Complete Formula Renault UK results ===
(key) (Races in bold indicate pole position) (Races in italics indicate fastest lap)

| Year | Entrant | 1 | 2 | 3 | 4 | 5 | 6 | 7 | 8 | 9 | 10 | 11 | 12 | 13 | 14 | 15 | 16 | 17 | 18 | 19 | 20 | 21 | Pos | Points |
|---|---|---|---|---|---|---|---|---|---|---|---|---|---|---|---|---|---|---|---|---|---|---|---|---|
| 2009 | CRS Racing | **BRI**; **1**; 2 | BRI; 2 DNS | THR; 1; 7 | THR; 2; 3 | DON; 1; 6 | DON; 2; 12 | OUL; 1; 2 | OUL; 2; 5 | CRO; 1; 11 | CRO; 2; 9 | SIL1; 1; 12 | SIL1; 2; 8 | SNE; 1; 8 | SNE; 2 Ret | SIL2; 1; 4 | SIL2; 2; 6 | ROC; 1; 4 | ROC; 2; 3 | BHGP; 1; 6 | BHGP; 2; 10 | | 5th | 323 |
| 2010 | CRS Racing | THR; 1; 3 | THR; 2; 3 | **ROC**; **1**; 2 | **ROC**; **2**; 1 | BHGP; 1 C | BHGP; 2; 6 | OUL; 1; 9 | OUL; 2; 3 | CRO; 1; 7 | CRO; 2; 8 | SNE; 1; 5 | **SNE**; **2**; 1 | SIL1; 1; 3 | SIL1; 2 Ret | SIL1; 3; 10 | KNO; 1; 4 | KNO; 2; 7 | SIL2; 1 Ret | SIL2; 2; 8 | BRI; 1; 4 | BRI; 2; 8 | 5th | 375 |

=== Complete FIA Formula 3 European Championship results ===
(key) (Races in bold indicate pole position; races in italics indicate fastest lap)

| Year | Entrant | Engine | 1 | 2 | 3 | 4 | 5 | 6 | 7 | 8 | 9 | 10 | 11 | 12 | 13 | 14 | 15 | 16 | 17 | 18 | 19 | 20 | 21 | 22 | 23 | 24 | 25 | 26 | 27 | 28 | 29 | 30 | DC | Points |
|---|---|---|---|---|---|---|---|---|---|---|---|---|---|---|---|---|---|---|---|---|---|---|---|---|---|---|---|---|---|---|---|---|---|---|
| 2012 | Carlin | Volkswagen | HOC; 1 | HOC; 2 | LEC; 1; 7 | LEC; 2 Ret | BRH; 1 Ret | BRH; 2; 6 | RBR; 1 | RBR; 2 | NOR; 1; 8 | NOR; 2; 10 | SPA; 1; 13 | SPA; 2; 9 | NÜR; 1 | NÜR; 2 | ZAN; 1 | ZAN; 2 | VAL; 1 | VAL; 2 | HOC; 1 | HOC; 2 | | | | | | | | | | | NC† | 0† |
| 2013 | Carlin | Volkswagen | MNZ; 1; 5 | MNZ; 2; 5 | MNZ; 3; 6 | **SIL**; **1**; 1 | **SIL**; **2**; 4 | SIL; 3; 9 | HOC; 1; 5 | HOC; 2; 13 | HOC; 3; 25 | BRH; 1; 5 | BRH; 2; 7 | BRH; 3; 2 | RBR; 1; 12 | RBR; 2; 7 | RBR; 3; 4 | NOR; 1; 6 | NOR; 2; 8 | NOR; 3; 8 | NÜR; 1; 11 | NÜR; 2; 10 | NÜR; 3; 4 | ZAN; 1; 6 | ZAN; 2; 6 | ZAN; 3; 6 | VAL; 1; 11 | VAL; 2; 18 | VAL; 3; 8 | HOC; 1; 5 | HOC; 2; 5 | HOC; 3; 5 | 5th | 227 |

^{†} As Tincknell was a guest driver, he was ineligible for points.

=== Complete European Le Mans Series results ===
| Year | Entrant | Class | Chassis | Engine | 1 | 2 | 3 | 4 | 5 | 6 | Rank | Points |
|---|---|---|---|---|---|---|---|---|---|---|---|---|
| 2014 | Jota Sport | LMP2 | Zytek Z11SN | Nissan VK45DE 4.5 L V8 | **SIL**; Ret | **IMO**; 1 | **RBR**; 2 | LEC; 4 | **EST**; 3 | | 2nd | 74 |
| 2015 | Jota Sport | LMP2 | Zytek Z11SN | Nissan VK45DE 4.5 L V8 | SIL; 2 | **IMO**; 3 | **RBR**; 1 | **LEC**; 3 | **EST**; 4 | | 3rd | 89 |
| 2016 | G-Drive Racing | LMP2 | Gibson 015S | Nissan VK45DE 4.5 L V8 | SIL; 1 | IMO; 2 | RBR; 3 | LEC; 5 | SPA; 5 | EST; 1 | 1st | 103 |
| 2019 | Thunderhead Carlin Racing | LMP2 | Dallara P217 | Gibson GK428 4.2 L V8 | LEC | MNZ; 11 | CAT; 9 | SIL; Ret | SPA | ALG; Ret | 27th | 2.5 |
| 2021 | Racing Team Turkey | LMP2 | Oreca 07 | Gibson GK428 4.2 L V8 | CAT; 15 | RBR | LEC; 6 | MNZ | SPA; Ret | ALG; WD | 24th | 8.5 |

=== Complete 24 Hours of Le Mans results ===
| Year | Team | Co-Drivers | Car | Class | Laps | Pos. | Class Pos. |
|---|---|---|---|---|---|---|---|
| 2014 | (United Kingdom) Jota Sport | (United Kingdom) Simon Dolan (United Kingdom) Oliver Turvey | Zytek Z11SN-Nissan | LMP2 | 356 | 5th | **1st** |
| 2015 | (Japan) Nissan Motorsports | (United Kingdom) Alex Buncombe (Germany) Michael Krumm | Nissan GT-R LM Nismo | LMP1 | 242 | NC | NC |
| 2016 | (United States) Ford Chip Ganassi Team UK | (United Kingdom) Marino Franchitti (United Kingdom) Andy Priaulx | Ford GT | GTE; Pro | 306 | 40th | 9th |
| 2017 | (United States) Ford Chip Ganassi Team UK | (United Kingdom) Andy Priaulx (Brazil) Pipo Derani | Ford GT | GTE; Pro | 340 | 18th | **2nd** |
| 2018 | (United States) Ford Chip Ganassi Team UK | (United Kingdom) Andy Priaulx (Brazil) Tony Kanaan | Ford GT | GTE; Pro | 332 | 36th | 12th |
| 2019 | (United States) Ford Chip Ganassi Team UK | (United States) Jonathan Bomarito (United Kingdom) Andy Priaulx | Ford GT | GTE; Pro | 342 | 23rd | 4th |
| 2020 | (United Kingdom) Aston Martin Racing | (United Kingdom) Alex Lynn (Belgium) Maxime Martin | Aston Martin Vantage AMR | GTE; Pro | 346 | 20th | **1st** |
| 2021 | (Germany) Proton Competition | (Thailand) Vuttikhorn Inthraphuvasak (France) Florian Latorre | Porsche 911 RSR-19 | GTE; Am | 66 | DNF | DNF |
| 2022 | (Germany) Dempsey-Proton Racing | (United Kingdom) Sebastian Priaulx (Germany) Christian Ried | Porsche 911 RSR-19 | GTE; Am | 336 | 47th | 14th |
| 2023 | (Germany) Proton Competition | (Germany) Jonas Ried (United States) Don Yount | Porsche 911 RSR-19 | GTE; Am | 170 | DNF | DNF |
| 2024 | (Germany) Proton Competition | (France) Julien Andlauer (Switzerland) Neel Jani | Porsche 963 | Hypercar | 251 | 45th | 16th |
| 2025 | (United States) Aston Martin THOR Team | (United Kingdom) Tom Gamble (United Kingdom) Ross Gunn | Aston Martin Valkyrie | Hypercar | 381 | 14th | 14th |
| 2026 | (United States) Aston Martin THOR Team | (United Kingdom) Tom Gamble (United Kingdom) Ross Gunn | Aston Martin Valkyrie | Hypercar | 379 | 8th | 8th |

=== Complete FIA World Endurance Championship results ===
(key) (Races in bold indicate pole position; races in italics indicate fastest lap)

| Year | Entrant | Class | Car | Engine | 1 | 2 | 3 | 4 | 5 | 6 | 7 | 8 | 9 | Rank | Points |
|---|---|---|---|---|---|---|---|---|---|---|---|---|---|---|---|
| 2014 | Jota Sport | LMP2 | Zytek Z11SN | Nissan VK45DE 4.5 L V8 | SIL | SPA; 2 | LMS; 1 | COA | FUJ | SHA | BHR | SÃO | | NC† | 0† |
| 2015 | Jota Sport | LMP2 | Gibson 015S | Nissan VK45DE 4.5 L V8 | SIL | SPA; 1 | | | | | | | | NC† | 0† |
| 2015 | Nissan Motorsports | LMP1 | Nissan GT-R LM Nismo | Nissan VRX30A 3.0 L Turbo V6 | | | LMS; NC | NÜR | COA | FUJ | SHA | BHR | | 34th | 0 |
| 2016 | Ford Chip Ganassi Team UK | LMGTE Pro | Ford GT | Ford EcoBoost 3.5 L Turbo V6 | SIL; 4 | SPA; 2 | LMS; 10 | NÜR; 12 | MEX; 5 | COA; 4 | FUJ; 1 | **SHA**; 1 | BHR; 4 | 5th | 117.5 |
| 2017 | Ford Chip Ganassi Team UK | LMGTE Pro | Ford GT | Ford EcoBoost 3.5 L Turbo V6 | **SIL**; 1 | SPA; 4 | LMS; 2 | NÜR; 5 | MEX; 4 | COA; 7 | FUJ; 13 | SHA; 1 | BHR; 3 | 3rd | 142.5 |
| 2018–19 | Ford Chip Ganassi Team UK | LMGTE Pro | Ford GT | Ford EcoBoost 3.5 L Turbo V6 | **SPA**; Ret | LMS; 12 | SIL; 2 | FUJ; 3 | SHA; 9 | SEB; 3 | **SPA**; 5 | LMS; 3 | | 4th | 90 |
| 2019–20 | Aston Martin Racing | LMGTE Pro | Aston Martin Vantage AMR | Aston Martin 4.0 L Turbo V8 | SIL | FUJ | SHA | BHR | COA | SPA | LMS; 1 | BHR | | 9th | 50 |
| 2022 | Dempsey-Proton Racing | LMGTE Am | Porsche 911 RSR-19 | Porsche 4.2 L Flat-6 | SEB; 4 | SPA; 1 | **LMS**; 8 | MNZ; 1 | FUJ; Ret | BHR; 8 | | | | 4th | 83 |
| 2023 | Proton Competition | LMGTE Am | Porsche 911 RSR-19 | Porsche 4.2 L Flat-6 | SEB; WD | ALG; 9 | SPA; 4 | LMS; Ret | | | | | | 22nd | 14 |
| 2023 | Proton Competition | Hypercar | Porsche 963 | Porsche 4.6 L Turbo V8 | | | | | MNZ; Ret | FUJ; 9 | BHR; 10 | | | 20th | 4 |
| 2024 | Proton Competition | Hypercar | Porsche 963 | Porsche 4.6 L Turbo V8 | QAT; 9 | IMO; NC | SPA | LMS; 14 | SÃO | COA; 11 | FUJ; 11 | BHR; 12 | | 30th | 3 |
| 2025 | Aston Martin THOR Team | Hypercar | Aston Martin Valkyrie AMR-LMH | Aston Martin RA 6.5 L V12 | QAT; Ret | IMO; 18 | SPA; 13 | LMS; 13 | SÃO; 16 | COA; Ret | FUJ; Ret | BHR; 15 | | 30th | 0 |
| 2026 | Aston Martin THOR Team | Hypercar | Aston Martin Valkyrie AMR-LMH | Aston Martin RA 6.5 L V12 | IMO; 9 | SPA; 4 | LMS; 8 | SÃO; 6 | COA; 4 | FUJ; 14 | CAT; Ret | MNZ; 12 | | 16th | 42 |

^{†} As Tincknell was a guest driver, he was ineligible to score points.

=== Complete IMSA SportsCar Championship results ===
| Year | Entrant | Class | Chassis | Engine | 1 | 2 | 3 | 4 | 5 | 6 | 7 | 8 | 9 | 10 | 11 | Rank | Points | Ref |
|---|---|---|---|---|---|---|---|---|---|---|---|---|---|---|---|---|---|---|
| 2017 | Ford Chip Ganassi Team UK | GTLM | Ford GT | Ford EcoBoost 3.5 L Turbo V6 | DAY; 5 | SEB | LBH | COA | WGL | MOS | LIM | ELK | VIR | LGA | PET | 23rd | 26 | |
| 2018 | Mazda Team Joest | P | Mazda RT24-P | Mazda MZ-2.0T 2.0 L Turbo I4 | DAY; 16 | SEB; 6 | LBH; 9 | MDO | DET; 14 | WGL; 10 | MOS; 11 | ELK; 8 | LGA; 4 | PET | | 17th | 171 | |
| 2019 | Mazda Team Joest | DPi | Mazda RT24-P | Mazda MZ-2.0T 2.0 L Turbo I4 | DAY; 9 | SEB; 6 | LBH; 8 | MDO | DET; 11 | **WGL**; 1 | MOS; 2 | ELK; 1 | LGA; 10 | PET; 11 | | 9th | 233 | |
| 2020 | Mazda Team Joest | DPi | Mazda RT24-P | Mazda MZ-2.0T 2.0 L Turbo I4 | DAY; 6 | | | | | | | | | | | 3rd | 260 | |
| 2020 | Mazda Motorsports | DPi | Mazda RT24-P | Mazda MZ-2.0T 2.0 L Turbo I4 | | DAY; 1 | SEB; 5 | ELK; 5 | ATL; 2 | MDO; 4 | PET; 6 | LGA; 4 | SEB; 1 | | | 3rd | 260 | |
| 2021 | Mazda Motorsports | DPi | Mazda RT24-P | Mazda MZ-2.0T 2.0 L Turbo I4 | DAY; 3 | SEB; 2 | **MDO**; 3 | DET; 4 | WGL; 1 | WGL; 5 | ELK; 2 | LGA; 5 | LBH; 5 | **PET**; 1 | | 3rd | 3264 | |
| 2022 | PR1/Mathiasen Motorsports | LMP2 | Oreca 07 | Gibson GK428 4.2 L V8 | DAY; 7† | SEB | LGA | MDO | WGL | ELK | PET | | | | | NC† | 0† | |
| 2023 | AO Racing Team | GTD | Porsche 911 GT3 R (992) | Porsche 4.2 L Flat-6 | DAY; 14 | SEB | LBH | LGA | WGL | MOS | LIM | | VIR | | | 62nd | 182 | |
| 2023 | Proton Competition | GTP | Porsche 963 | Porsche 9RD 4.6 L V8 | | | | | | | | ELK; 8 | | IMS; 9 | PET; 3 | 15th | 814 | |
| 2024 | Ford Multimatic Motorsports | GTD Pro | Ford Mustang GT3 | Ford Coyote 5.4 L V8 | DAY; 6 | SEB; 7 | LGA; 9 | DET; 11 | WGL; 5 | MOS; 4 | ELK; 10 | VIR; 2 | IMS; 2 | PET; 8 | | 6th | 2783 | |
| 2025 | Gradient Racing | GTD | Ford Mustang GT3 | Ford Coyote 5.4 L V8 | DAY; 17 | SEB | LBH | LGA | WGL | MOS | ELK | VIR | IMS | PET | | 85th | 154 | |
| 2026 | Bryan Herta Autosport with PR1/Mathiasen | LMP2 | Oreca 07 | Gibson GK428 4.2 L V8 | DAY; 6 | **SEB**; 8 | WGL; 6 | MOS | ELK; 6 | IMS; 2 | PET; 8 | | | | | 12th | 1709 | |

^{†} Points only counted towards the Michelin Endurance Cup, and not the overall LMP2 Championship.

== Personal ==
Tincknell attended St. John's School in Sidmouth, Devon, until the age of 12. He then attended Exeter School, where he achieved 10 GCSEs: six As and four Bs. Away from the race track, Tincknell enjoys playing golf, darts, rugby, and chess, as well as supporting Plymouth Argyle, his local football club.

Sporting positions
| Preceded by James Calado | Formula Renault UK Winter Series champion 2009 | Succeeded by Alex Lynn |
| Preceded by Jon Lancaster; Björn Wirdheim; Gary Hirsch | European Le Mans Series; LMP2 Champion; 2016; With: Simon Dolan & Giedo van der Garde | Succeeded by Memo Rojas; Leo Roussel |
