= Formula Renault 2.0 Sweden =

- Category: Formula Renault 2.0
- Country: (Denmark) (Sweden) (Finland) Scandinavia
- Inaugural season: 2002
- Constructors: Tatuus
- Engine suppliers: Renault
- Drivers' champion: (Sweden) Daniel Roos
- Teams' champion: (Sweden) BS Motorsport

The Formula Renault 2.0 Sweden is a Formula Renault 2.0 championship held in Denmark, Finland and Sweden between 2002 and 2006, and later since 2009. It has served as a support series to the Danish Touring Car Championship and Swedish Touring Car Championship.

This championship was formerly named Formula Renault 2000 Scandinavia until 2005 and Formula Renault 2.0 Nordic Series in 2006.

The Formula Renault 2.0 Finland ran from 2008 until 2010.

== Champions ==
Season	Series Name	Champion	Team Champion
2002	Formula Renault 2000 Scandinavia	(Denmark) Philip Andersen	??
2003	Formula Renault 2000 Scandinavia	(Denmark) Tom Pedersen	??
2004	Formula Renault 2000 Scandinavia	(Denmark) Kasper Andersen	(Denmark) Team Formula Sport
2005	Formula Renault 2.0 Nordic Series	(Denmark) Jesper Wulff Laursen	Racing Denmark
2006	Formula Renault 2.0 Nordic Series	(Denmark) Steffen Møller	(Denmark) KEO Racing
2007	Not held		
2008	Not held		
2009	Formula Renault 2.0 Sweden	(Sweden) Felix Rosenqvist	(Sweden) BS Motorsport
2010	Formula Renault 2.0 Sweden	(Sweden) Daniel Roos	(Sweden) BS Motorsport

Formula Renault 2.0 Finland

Season	Champion	Team
2008	(Finland) Jesse Krohn	(Finland) P1 Motorsport
2009	(Finland) Jukka Honkavuori	(Finland) Koiranen Bros. Motorsport
2010	(Finland) Miika Kunranta	(Finland) Koiranen Bros. Motorsport
