= 2010 Formula Renault 2.0 UK Championship =

Motor racing competition

Seasons
- ← 2009 2011 →

The 2010 Formula Renault 2.0 UK Championship was the 22nd British Formula Renault Championship. The season began at Thruxton on 3 April and ended on 10 October at Brands Hatch, after twenty rounds held in England, and for the first time since 2006, Scotland. Making its debut in the series in 2010 was the new-specification car, designed by Barazi-Epsilon, replacing the Tatuus chassis that had been in the series since 2000.

At the age of 16 years, 314 days, Anglo-Swedish driver Tom Blomqvist of the Fortec Motorsport team became the youngest drivers' champion in series history after coming out on top of a season-long battle with his rivals. Despite winning just three races – coming in succession at Silverstone National and Knockhill – Blomqvist won the championship due to his superior finishing record, finishing 19 of the season's 20 races within the top seven placings; giving Fortec their third title in the last four seasons. Lewis Williamson of Manor Competition finished the season as runner-up behind Blomqvist, 14 points behind on overall scores, but was eight points closer on the series' championship system in which a driver's two worst scores are not considered towards the championship. Williamson took five victories during the season, but mistakes at Brands Hatch when he spun out of the lead while leading the race and a poor start in the final race, as well as errors at Croft prevented him from becoming Manor's second successive champion after Dean Smith's triumph in 2009.

Also in the running for the championship at the final Brands Hatch meeting were Atech GP's Tamás Pál Kiss and Williamson's Manor teammate Will Stevens, but poor results for both drivers in the first race mathematically eliminated them from contention. Pál Kiss had started the season strongly, having finished on the podium in six of the first seven races with three victories but failed to reach the top step of the podium in any of the remaining races, taking just two further podiums en route to third place in the championship. Stevens took fourth in the championship finishing nine points behind Pál Kiss on overall scores and 20 on dropped scores after finishing every race of the season including victories at Thruxton and the Brands Hatch GP meeting. CRS Racing's top driver was Harry Tincknell, who finished fifth in the championship with victories at Rockingham and Snetterton.

Five other drivers tasted success during the season, with only Riki Christodoulou not finishing within the top ten of the championship, due to him not partaking in the full campaign. Ollie Millroy was another winner for Manor, when he won from pole position at Snetterton, Pál Kiss' Atech GP teammates Nick Yelloly and Marlon Stöckinger each won races at Brands Hatch and Croft respectively, Christodoulou won the season finale at Brands Hatch for Fortec, while CRS Racing's Robert Foster-Jones won at Knockhill before retiring at the end of the season, aged just 20 years old. In other championships, Alex Lynn bested Fabio Gamberini for Graduate Cup honours for first-year drivers, while Manor Competition comfortable won the Entrants' Championship by 96 points.

== Teams and drivers ==
2010 Entry List
Team	No.	Driver name	Class	Rounds
(United Kingdom) Manor Competition	1	(United Kingdom) Josh Mulholland		1–2
(United Kingdom) Manor Competition	1	(United Kingdom) Ollie Millroy		4–10
(United Kingdom) Manor Competition	3	(United Kingdom) Will Stevens		All
(United Kingdom) Manor Competition	7	(Netherlands) Thomas Hylkema		All
(United Kingdom) Manor Competition	17	(United Kingdom) Lewis Williamson		All
(United Kingdom) CRS Racing	2	(United Kingdom) Michael Lyons		All
(United Kingdom) CRS Racing	5	(United Kingdom) Harry Tincknell		All
(United Kingdom) CRS Racing	15	(Brazil) Victor Corrêa		1–4
(United Kingdom) CRS Racing	15	(United Kingdom) Riki Christodoulou		5
(United Kingdom) CRS Racing	15	(Brazil) Yann Cunha		9
(United Kingdom) CRS Racing	55	(United Kingdom) Robert Foster-Jones		All
(United Kingdom) Team Firstair	4	(United Kingdom) Jordan Oakes		1
(United Kingdom) Team Firstair	4	(United Kingdom) Richard Singleton		2, 7, 10
(United Kingdom) Team Firstair	11	(United Kingdom) David McDonald		1–3
(United Kingdom) Team Firstair	11	(United Kingdom) Luciano Bacheta		7
(United Kingdom) Team Firstair	11	(Argentina) Facundo Conta		10
(United Kingdom) Fortec Motorsport	6	(United Kingdom) David McDonald		4–8
(United Kingdom) Fortec Motorsport	10	(Sweden) (United Kingdom) Tom Blomqvist		All
(United Kingdom) Fortec Motorsport	27	(United Kingdom) Ollie Millroy		1–3
(United Kingdom) Fortec Motorsport	27	(United Kingdom) Riki Christodoulou		6–10
(United Kingdom) Fortec Motorsport	36	(United Kingdom) Alex Lynn	G	All
(United Kingdom) Fortec Motorsport	99	(United Kingdom) Chrissy Palmer		1–2
(United Kingdom) Apotex Scorpio Motorsport	8	(United Kingdom) Joe Crook		1, 3–10
(United Kingdom) Apotex Scorpio Motorsport	8	(United Kingdom) Kieren Clark		2
(United Kingdom) Atech GP	12	(United Kingdom) Nick Yelloly		All
(United Kingdom) Atech GP	33	(Philippines) Marlon Stöckinger		All
(United Kingdom) Atech GP	47	(Hungary) Tamás Pál Kiss		All
(United Kingdom) Mark Burdett Motorsport	21	(Brazil) Fabio Gamberini	G	1–5, 7–10
(United Kingdom) Mark Burdett Motorsport	22	(Finland) Jesse Laine		1–6
(Spain) Epsilon Euskadi	23	(Italy) Giovanni Venturini		9
(Spain) Epsilon Euskadi	24	(Spain) Alex Riberas		9
(France) Tech 1 Racing	51	(France) Arthur Pic		9
(France) Tech 1 Racing	61	(France) Hugo Valente		9
(France) Tech 1 Racing	71	(Finland) Aaro Vainio		9
(Italy) Cram Competition	77	(Brazil) André Negrão		9

Icon	Class
G	Graduate Cup

== Calendar ==
The series supported the British Touring Car Championship at all rounds except Donington Park on 19 September, as Formula Renault formed part of the World Series by Renault meeting on the same date, at Silverstone.

Round		Circuit	Date	Pole position	Fastest lap	Winning driver	Winning team
1	R1	Thruxton Circuit, Hampshire	3 April	(United Kingdom) Lewis Williamson	(Sweden) Tom Blomqvist	(Hungary) Tamás Pál Kiss	Atech GP
1	R2	Thruxton Circuit, Hampshire	4 April	(United Kingdom) Will Stevens	(United Kingdom) Lewis Williamson	(United Kingdom) Will Stevens	Manor Competition
2	R3	Rockingham Motor Speedway, Northamptonshire	25 April	(United Kingdom) Harry Tincknell	(United Kingdom) Harry Tincknell	(Hungary) Tamás Pál Kiss	Atech GP
2	R4	Rockingham Motor Speedway, Northamptonshire	25 April	(United Kingdom) Harry Tincknell	(United Kingdom) Lewis Williamson	(United Kingdom) Harry Tincknell	CRS Racing
3	R5	Brands Hatch (GP), Kent	2 May	Race Cancelled^{1}			
3	R6	Brands Hatch (GP), Kent	2 May	(United Kingdom) Lewis Williamson	(United Kingdom) Lewis Williamson	(United Kingdom) Will Stevens	Manor Competition
4	R7	Oulton Park, Cheshire	5 June	(Sweden) Tom Blomqvist	(Sweden) Tom Blomqvist	(United Kingdom) Lewis Williamson	Manor Competition
4	R8	Oulton Park, Cheshire	6 June	(Sweden) Tom Blomqvist	(Sweden) Tom Blomqvist	(Hungary) Tamás Pál Kiss	Atech GP
5	R9	Croft Circuit, North Yorkshire	19 June	(Philippines) Marlon Stöckinger	(United Kingdom) Ollie Millroy	(Philippines) Marlon Stöckinger	Atech GP
5	R10	Croft Circuit, North Yorkshire	20 June	(Netherlands) Thomas Hylkema	(United Kingdom) Lewis Williamson	(United Kingdom) Lewis Williamson	Manor Competition
6	R11	Snetterton Motor Racing Circuit, Norfolk	8 August	(United Kingdom) Ollie Millroy	(United Kingdom) Michael Lyons	(United Kingdom) Ollie Millroy	Manor Competition
6	R12	Snetterton Motor Racing Circuit, Norfolk	8 August	(United Kingdom) Harry Tincknell	(United Kingdom) Harry Tincknell	(United Kingdom) Harry Tincknell	CRS Racing
7	R5^{1}	Silverstone Circuit (National), Northamptonshire	21 August	(United Kingdom) Lewis Williamson	(United Kingdom) Tom Blomqvist	(United Kingdom) Lewis Williamson	Manor Competition
7	R13	Silverstone Circuit (National), Northamptonshire	22 August	(Philippines) Marlon Stöckinger	(United Kingdom) Nick Yelloly	(United Kingdom) Tom Blomqvist	Fortec Motorsport
7	R14	Silverstone Circuit (National), Northamptonshire	22 August	(United Kingdom) Tom Blomqvist	(United Kingdom) Nick Yelloly	(United Kingdom) Tom Blomqvist	Fortec Motorsport
8	R15	Knockhill Racing Circuit, Fife	5 September	(United Kingdom) Tom Blomqvist	(United Kingdom) Tom Blomqvist	(United Kingdom) Tom Blomqvist	Fortec Motorsport
8	R16	Knockhill Racing Circuit, Fife	5 September	(United Kingdom) Robert Foster-Jones	(United Kingdom) Ollie Millroy	(United Kingdom) Robert Foster-Jones	CRS Racing
9	R17	Silverstone Circuit (Arena), Northamptonshire	19 September	(United Kingdom) Lewis Williamson	(United Kingdom) Tom Blomqvist	(United Kingdom) Lewis Williamson	Manor Competition
9	R18	Silverstone Circuit (Arena), Northamptonshire	19 September	(United Kingdom) Lewis Williamson	(Spain) Alex Riberas	(United Kingdom) Lewis Williamson	Manor Competition
10	R19	Brands Hatch (Indy), Kent	10 October	(United Kingdom) Nick Yelloly	(United Kingdom) Tom Blomqvist	(United Kingdom) Nick Yelloly	Atech GP
10	R20	Brands Hatch (Indy), Kent	10 October	(United Kingdom) Riki Christodoulou	(Hungary) Tamás Pál Kiss	(United Kingdom) Riki Christodoulou	Fortec Motorsport

Notes:

1. – The first race at Brands Hatch was cancelled due to bad weather conditions. As a result, the race was run at the Silverstone round of the championship, with grid positions standing for the race.

== Standings ==
=== Drivers' Championship ===
- Points were awarded on a 32–28–25–22–20–18–16–14–12–11–10–9–8–7–6–5–4–3–2–1 basis, with 2 points for fastest lap. A driver's 18 best results counted towards the championship, with Graduate Cup runners' best 15 scores counting for that classification.

Pos	Driver	THR		ROC		BHGP		OUL		CRO		SNE		SIL			KNO		SIL		BHI		Pts	Grad
Pos	Driver	1	2	3	4	5	6	7	8	9	10	11	12	5	13	14	15	16	17	18	19	20	Pts	Grad
1	(Sweden) (United Kingdom) Tom Blomqvist	5	5	7	6	C	3	2	2	3	5	7	2	13	1	1	1	5	2	2	3	2	465	
2	(United Kingdom) Lewis Williamson	4	2	6	4	C	7	1	5	11	1	6	3	1	4	2	13	4	1	1	2	4	459	
3	(Hungary) Tamás Pál Kiss	1	4	1	2	C	2	3	1	4	6	4	7	4	3	5	6	2	6	Ret	12	14	417	
4	(United Kingdom) Will Stevens	2	1	5	3	C	1	4	4	8	3	2	4	2	11	4	8	10	5	5	9	11	397	
5	(United Kingdom) Harry Tincknell	3	3	2	1	C	6	9	3	7	8	5	1	3	Ret	10	4	7	Ret	8	4	8	375	
6	(United Kingdom) Ollie Millroy	7	Ret	4	5	C	11	5	10	2	12	1	5	5	Ret	3	Ret	3	4	7	6	6	336	
7	(United Kingdom) Nick Yelloly	6	11	Ret	7	C	4	6	14	16	11	3	6	11	2	13	5	9	7	4	1	7	312	
8	(Philippines) Marlon Stöckinger	10	15	3	Ret	C	15	11	6	1	2	9	Ret	10	5	15	7	8	Ret	6	5	5	273	
9	(United Kingdom) Robert Foster-Jones	8	10	9	10	C	16	Ret	13	5	10	10	15	15	6	11	2	1	8	12	10	Ret	237	
10	(United Kingdom) Alex Lynn	9	9	14	13	C	8	Ret	9	10	16	11	11	6	12	16	12	6	10	18	8	3	210	193
11	(United Kingdom) Riki Christodoulou									9	4	Ret	9		Ret	DNS	3	13	3	3	7	1	177	
12	(United Kingdom) Michael Lyons	Ret	8	11	9	C	14	Ret	12	13	7	8	10	9	Ret	12	10	11	14	16	15	12	172	
13	(United Kingdom) David McDonald	16	6	18	15	C	5	10	7	12	9	14	14	8	10	9	9	DSQ					163	
14	(Netherlands) Thomas Hylkema	12	12	10	11	C	12	13	11	6	Ret	Ret	8	14	8	6	Ret	12	12	15	Ret	DNS	161	
15	(Brazil) Fabio Gamberini	Ret	19	19	16	C	13	7	8	17	13			7	7	7	Ret	Ret	13	Ret	Ret	10	126	126
16	(United Kingdom) Joe Crook	15	17			C	17	8	Ret	15	14	13	13	12	9	14	11	Ret	Ret	Ret	13	13	111	
17	(Finland) Jesse Laine	14	16	16	17	C	9	12	15	14	15	12	12										79	
18	(United Kingdom) Chrissy Palmer	11	13	8	8																		46	
19	(Brazil) Victor Corrêa	13	14	12	19	C	10	Ret	16														42	
20	(United Kingdom) Richard Singleton			15	18										Ret	Ret					11	9	31	
21	(France) Hugo Valente																		9	11			22	
22	(United Kingdom) Josh Mulholland	Ret	18	13	12																		20	
23	(United Kingdom) Jordan Oakes	Ret	7																				16	
24	(France) Arthur Pic																		17	10			15	
25	(United Kingdom) Luciano Bacheta														Ret	8							14	
26	(Spain) Alex Riberas																		11	19			14	
27	(Argentina) Facundo Conta																				14	15	13	
28	(Finland) Aaro Vainio																		Ret	9			12	
29	(Italy) Giovanni Venturini																		16	14			12	
30	(United Kingdom) Kieren Clark			17	14																		11	
31	(Brazil) Yann Cunha																		15	17			10	
32	(Brazil) André Negrão																		Ret	13			8	
Pos	Driver	THR		ROC		BHGP		OUL		CRO		SNE		SIL			KNO		SIL		BHI		Pts	Grad

Colour	Result
Gold	Winner
Silver	Second place
Bronze	Third place
Green	Points classification
Blue	Non-points classification
Blue	Non-classified finish (NC)
Purple	Retired, not classified (Ret)
Red	Did not qualify (DNQ)
Red	Did not pre-qualify (DNPQ)
Black	Disqualified (DSQ)
White	Did not start (DNS)
White	Withdrew (WD)
White	Race cancelled (C)
Blank	Did not practice (DNP)
Blank	Did not arrive (DNA)
Blank	Excluded (EX)

=== Entrants' Championship ===
Pos	Entrant	THR		ROC		BHGP		OUL		CRO		SNE		SIL			KNO		SIL		BHI		Pts
1	(United Kingdom) Manor Competition	2	1	5	3	C	1	1	4	2	1	1	3	1	4	2	8	3	1	1	2	4	959
1	(United Kingdom) Manor Competition	4	2	6	4	C	7	4	5	6	3	2	4	2	8	3	13	4	4	5	6	6	959
2	(United Kingdom) Atech GP	1	4	1	2	C	2	3	1	1	2	3	6	4	2	5	5	2	6	4	1	5	863
2	(United Kingdom) Atech GP	6	11	3	7	C	4	6	6	4	6	4	7	10	3	13	6	8	7	6	5	7	863
3	(United Kingdom) Fortec Motorsport	5	5	4	5	C	3	2	2	3	5	7	2	6	1	1	1	5	2	2	3	1	820
3	(United Kingdom) Fortec Motorsport	7	9	7	6	C	8	10	7	10	9	11	9	8	11	9	3	6	3	3	7	2	820
4	(United Kingdom) CRS Racing	3	3	2	1	C	6	9	3	5	4	5	1	3	6	10	2	1	8	8	4	8	662
4	(United Kingdom) CRS Racing	8	8	9	9	C	10	Ret	12	7	7	8	10	9	Ret	11	4	7	14	12	10	12	662
5	(United Kingdom) Mark Burdett Motorsport	14	16	16	16	C	9	7	8	14	13	12	12	7	7	7	Ret	Ret	13	Ret	Ret	10	205
5	(United Kingdom) Mark Burdett Motorsport	Ret	19	19	17	C	13	12	15	17	15												205
6	(United Kingdom) Team Firstair	16	6	15	15	C	5								Ret	8					11	9	126
6	(United Kingdom) Team Firstair	Ret	7	18	18										Ret	Ret					14	15	126
7	(United Kingdom) Apotex Scorpio Motorsport	15	17	17	14	C	17	8	Ret	15	14	13	13	12	9	14	11	Ret	Ret	Ret	13	13	122
8	(France) Tech 1 Racing																		9	9			39
8	(France) Tech 1 Racing																		17	10			39
9	(Spain) Epsilon Euskadi																		11	14			24
9	(Spain) Epsilon Euskadi																		16	19			24
10	(Italy) Cram Competition																		Ret	13			8
Pos	Entrant	THR		ROC		BHGP		OUL		CRO		SNE		SIL			KNO		SIL		BHI		Pts

== Formula Renault UK Winter Series ==
The 2010 Michelin Formula Renault UK Winter Series was the 13th British Formula Renault Winter Series. The series commenced at Snetterton on 6 November and ended at Pembrey on 14 November, after six races at three rounds held in England and Wales.

Fortec Motorsport again took honours for the Series, as main season Graduate Cup winner Alex Lynn won the title after winning three of the six races to be held. He finished 17 points clear of teammate Joni Wiman, who made his Formula Renault début during the series having competed in ADAC Formel Masters, and claimed a victory at Pembrey. Jack Hawksworth finished third in his first single-seater championship, having taken two podiums and five top-ten finishes in his first six races out of karting for Mark Burdett Motorsport. Atech GP driver Richie Stanaway and Oliver Rowland of CRS Racing claimed the remaining victories as they finished in fifth and seventh places respectively. With five class wins, Fortec's Josh Webster won the BARC Winter Cup for the Formula Renault BARC competitors.

=== Teams and drivers ===
2010 Winter Series UK Class Entry List
Team	No.	Driver name	Class
Manor Competition	1	(United Kingdom) Ollie Millroy	
Manor Competition	15	(United Kingdom) Alice Powell	
Manor Competition	19	(United Kingdom) Josh Hill	
Manor Competition	42	(United Kingdom) Jordan King	
SWB Motorsport	2	(United Kingdom) Mackenzie Taylor	B
Atech GP	4	(United Kingdom) Matt Bell	
Atech GP	5	(New Zealand) Richie Stanaway	
Fortec Motorsport	6	(Australia) Mitchell Gilbert	
Fortec Motorsport	16	(United Kingdom) Dan Wells	
Fortec Motorsport	36	(United Kingdom) Alex Lynn	
Fortec Motorsport	46	(Russia) Roman Beregech	B
Fortec Motorsport	47	(Puerto Rico) Félix Serrallés	I
Fortec Motorsport	56	(United Kingdom) Josh Webster	B
Fortec Motorsport	66	(Finland) Joni Wiman	
CRS Racing	7	(Croatia) Evelin Frank	B
CRS Racing	44	(United Kingdom) Oliver Rowland	
CRS Racing	55	(United Kingdom) Robert Foster-Jones	
Mark Burdett Motorsport	20	(United Kingdom) Mitchell Hale	
Mark Burdett Motorsport	21	(United Kingdom) Jack Hawksworth	
Hillspeed	22	(United Kingdom) Howard Fuller	B
Hillspeed	43	(United Kingdom) David Wagner	B
Koiranen Bros. Motorsport	26	(Spain) Carlos Sainz Jr.	
Koiranen Bros. Motorsport	27	(Estonia) Antti Rammo	
Koiranen Bros. Motorsport	28	(Sweden) John Bryant-Meisner	
Koiranen Bros. Motorsport	29	(Russia) Daniil Kvyat	
MGR Motorsport	41	(United Kingdom) Luke Wright	

Icon	Class
B	BARC Class
I	Invitation Class

=== Calendar ===
Round		Circuit	Date	Pole position	Fastest lap	Winning driver	Winning team
1	R1	Snetterton, Norfolk	6 November	(United Kingdom) Jack Hawksworth	(United Kingdom) Alex Lynn	(United Kingdom) Alex Lynn	Fortec Motorsport
1	R2	Snetterton, Norfolk	6 November	(Russia) Daniil Kvyat	(United Kingdom) Ollie Millroy	(United Kingdom) Alex Lynn	Fortec Motorsport
2	R3	Pembrey, Carmarthenshire	13 November	(United Kingdom) Jack Hawksworth	(Finland) Joni Wiman	(Finland) Joni Wiman	Fortec Motorsport
2	R4	Pembrey, Carmarthenshire	13 November	(United Kingdom) Jack Hawksworth	(Finland) Joni Wiman	(United Kingdom) Alex Lynn	Fortec Motorsport
3	R5	Pembrey, Carmarthenshire	14 November	(United Kingdom) Jack Hawksworth	(Finland) Joni Wiman	(New Zealand) Richie Stanaway	Atech GP
3	R6	Pembrey, Carmarthenshire	14 November	(United Kingdom) Alex Lynn	(New Zealand) Richie Stanaway	(United Kingdom) Oliver Rowland	CRS Racing

=== Championship standings ===
Pos	Driver	SNE		PEM		PEM		Pts
UK Winter Cup
1	(United Kingdom) Alex Lynn	1	1	11	1	6	5	146
2	(Finland) Joni Wiman	8	6	1	2	4	12	129
3	(United Kingdom) Jack Hawksworth	4	13	3	10	2	6	112
4	(Russia) Daniil Kvyat	Ret	3	2	4	5	8	109
5	(New Zealand) Richie Stanaway	3	Ret	Ret	9	1	2	99
6	(United Kingdom) Ollie Millroy	2	4	12	5	Ret	7	97
7	(United Kingdom) Oliver Rowland	12	12	4	12	8	1	95
8	(United Kingdom) Luke Wright	5	2	Ret	3	10	10	95
9	(United Kingdom) Josh Hill	7	Ret	7	6	3	11	85
10	(Australia) Mitchell Gilbert	Ret	9	5	11	12	3	76
11	(United Kingdom) Dan Wells	10	5	Ret	13	11	14	56
12	(United Kingdom) Alice Powell	9	7	10	8	Ret	Ret	53
13	(United Kingdom) Matt Bell	Ret	8	14	14	Ret	4	51
14	(United Kingdom) Robert Foster-Jones	14	Ret	DNS	7	7	16	44
15	(United Kingdom) Jordan King	11	10	6	Ret	19	20	43
16	(Estonia) Antti Rammo	Ret	11	9	17	Ret	9	39
17	(Sweden) John Bryant-Meisner	13	Ret	8	Ret	9	19	36
18	(Spain) Carlos Sainz Jr.	6	Ret					18
	(United Kingdom) Mitchell Hale	Ret	Ret					0
Guest drivers ineligible for points
	(Puerto Rico) Félix Serrallés			13	15	14	Ret	0
BARC Winter Cup
1	(United Kingdom) Josh Webster	15	14	15	16	13	15	52
2	(United Kingdom) David Wagner	16	15	19	18	18	13	30
3	(United Kingdom) Howard Fuller	17	17	16	21	16	17	25
4	(Russia) Roman Beregech	Ret	16	17	19	17	18	21
5	(United Kingdom) Mackenzie Taylor	18	18	18	20	15	Ret	19
6	(Croatia) Evelin Frank	19	19	20	22	20	Ret	8
Pos	Driver	SNE		PEM		PEM		Pts

Colour	Result
Gold	Winner
Silver	Second place
Bronze	Third place
Green	Points classification
Blue	Non-points classification
Blue	Non-classified finish (NC)
Purple	Retired, not classified (Ret)
Red	Did not qualify (DNQ)
Red	Did not pre-qualify (DNPQ)
Black	Disqualified (DSQ)
White	Did not start (DNS)
White	Withdrew (WD)
White	Race cancelled (C)
Blank	Did not practice (DNP)
Blank	Did not arrive (DNA)
Blank	Excluded (EX)
