= Kemora Circuit =

Motor racing track in Veteli, Finland

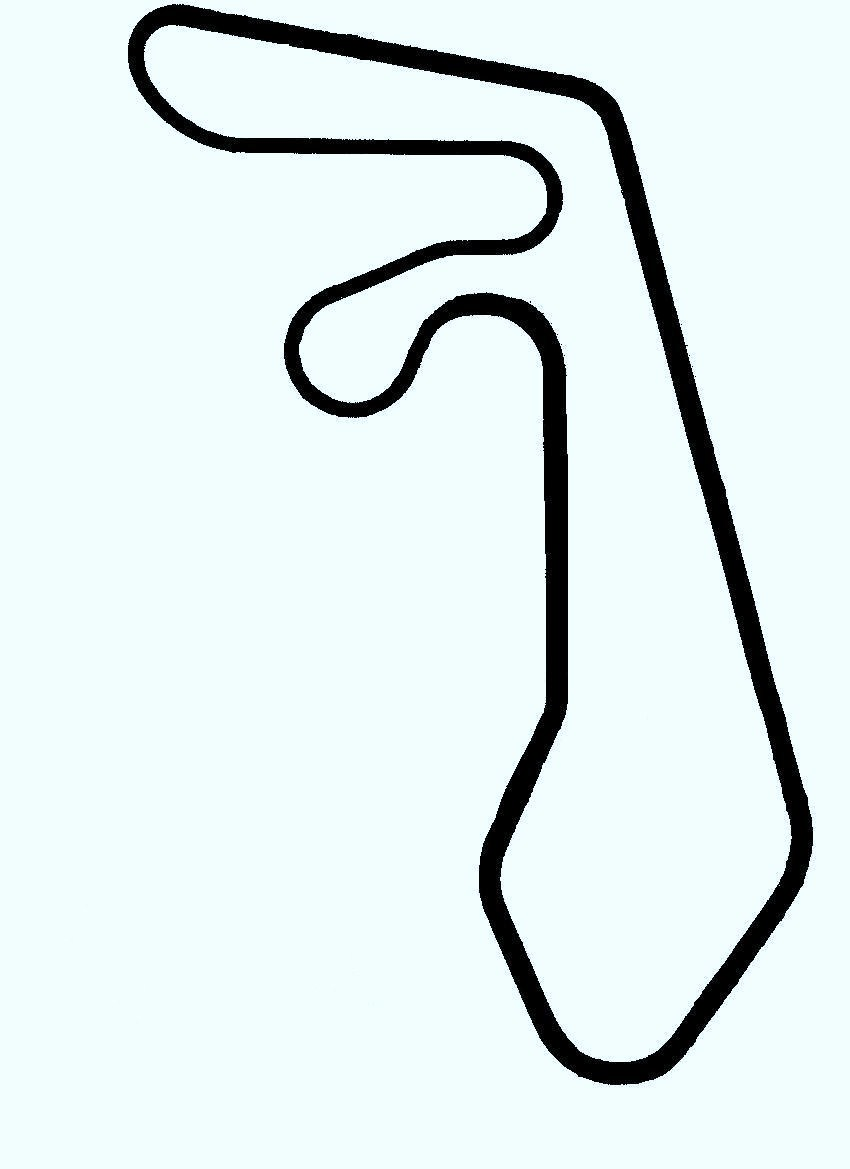
- Full Circuit (1987–present)
- Location: Veteli, Finland
- Coordinates: 63°25.1′N 023°59.1′E
- Capacity: 4,000
- Opened: 1983
- Major events: Former: European Truck Racing Championship (1990–1994)
- Website: kemora.fi/en/

Full Circuit (1987–present)
- Length: 2.733 km (1.698 mi)
- Turns: 10
- Race lap record: 1:03.703 ( (Finland) Juha Mäki-Jouppi, Dallara F308, 2021, F3)

Short Circuit (1983–present)
- Length: 1.448 km (0.900 mi)
- Turns: 7

Kemora is a racing circuit situated in Veteli municipality, Central Ostrobothnia, Finland. The track was built in 1983 and lengthened in 1987. The current track is 2.733 km (1.698 mi) long. In the same area is also a kart racing track and a snowmobile track used in winter.

== Events ==
The Finnish Formula 3 Championship held regular races on the Kemora Circuit until 2010. Other regular events include the annual Historic Car Race and the Road Racing SM Series (Finnish motorcycle series). Today, the circuit hosts national, automobile and motorcycle championship races.

From 1987 to 1991, an annual 500 km race for touring cars and GTs was held on the circuit.
