= 2007 Formula Renault seasons =

2007 Formula Renault

Seasons
- ← 2006 2008 →

This page describe all the 2007 seasons of Formula Renault series.

== Calendar ==
This table indicate the round number of each Formula Renault series according to weekend dates. The dark note indicate Winter Series.

Formula; Renault	March				April					May				June				July					August				September					October				November				December
Formula; Renault	3–4	10–11	17–18	24–25	31–1	7–8	14–15	21–22	28–29	5–6	12–13	19–20	26–27	2–3	9–10	16–17	23–24	30–1	7–8	14–15	21–22	28–29	4–5	11–12	18–19	25–26	1–2	8–9	15–16	22–23	29–30	6–7	13–14	20–21	27–28	3–4	10–11	17–18	24–25	1–2	8–9	15–16
FR3.5							1–2			3–4			5							6–7					8–9			10–11		12–13				14–15	16–17
V6 Asia										1–2							3–4				5–6								7–8				9–10			11–12
Eurocup								1–2		3–4										5–6								7–8		9–10				11–12	13–14
France		1–2			3–4		5–6												7–8											9–10			11–12		13–14
UK					1–2			3–4		5–6				7–8			9–10			11–12		13–14			15–16			17–18					19–20			1–2	3–4
BARC									1			2–3				4					5–6			7–8		9–10			11		12					1–2	3–4
Italy					1–2						3–4					5–6		7–8			9–10								11–12				13–14				1–2	3–4
NEC													1–2						3–4		5–6		7–8			9–10					11–12		13–14	15–16
Suisse						1–2			3–4		5–6		7–8											9–10							11–12
America				1–2						3				4								5										6–7					8–9
TR 2000 Pro		1–2	3–4							5–6				7–8	9–10					11–12				13–14					15–16				17–18				19–20
Asia										1–2							3–4						5–6				7–8			9–10			11–12						13–14
Campus						1–2			3–4		5–6			7–8						9–10										11–12								13–14
Belgium					1–2			3–4		5–6																		7–8			9–10			11–12
Argentina	1			2			3		4			5						6			7						8		9			10						11		12		13
1600 Junior				1–2						3				4								5										6–7					8–9
TR 1600 Pro		1–2	3–4							5–6				7–8	9–10					11–12				13–14					15–16				17–18				19–20

== Formula Renault 2.0L ==
=== 2007 Championnat de France Formula Renault 2.0 season ===
The 2007 season was the last of the French Formula Renault championship as independent series. It was included in 2008 in the Formula Renault 2.0 West European Cup. The last round of the French championship was held out of France, in the Circuit de Catalunya, Barcelona as symbol of the series mutations that expand to Western Europe (Portugal, Spain, France and Belgium) in 2008.

- Point system : 15, 12, 10, 8, 6, 5, 4, 3, 2, 1. In each race 1 point for Fastest lap and 1 for Pole position.
- Races : 2 race by rounds (first between 60 and 80 km, second between 20 and 30 minutes).

A Rookie (R) and Challenger Cup (C) classifications are also established for newcomers and young drivers.

Pos	Driver	Team	(France) NOG March 8–9		(France) LED March 28–29		(France) DIJ Avril 12–13		(France) VIE July 7–8		(France) MAG September 22–23	(France) MAG October 13–14		(Spain) CAT October 27–28		Points
Pos	Driver	Team	1	2	3	4	5	6	7	8	9	10	11	12	13	Points
1	(France) Jules Bianchi (R)	SG Formula	2	3*	1*	1*	4	1*	2*	2*	3	1*	5*	1	3	172
2	(France) Mathieu Arzeno	Pole Services, Epsilon Support	1*	1	2	Ret	9	5	1	3	1	4	4	5	5	123
3	(France) Alexandre Marsoin	SG Formula	Ret	2	10	9	1*	Ret	7	1	Ret	Ret	3	2	2	84
4	(France) Charles Pic (R)	SG Formula	9	4	Ret	5	Ret	2	Ret	Ret	Ret	3	2	3	4	69
5	(France) Tristan Vautier (R)	Graff Racing	3	6	9	3	3	7	5	7	11	Ret	7	4	7	69
6	(United Kingdom) Jon Lancaster	SG Formula			8	21	8	17	10	5	7	2	1	DNS	1	64
7	(France) Pierre Combot (1)	Pole Services, Graff Racing, Cram Competition	5	Ret	Ret	13	2	6	3	10	6	6	11	8	10	52
8	(France) Nelson Lukes (R)	Epsilon Formula	Ret	9	3	2	11	3	6	6	24	Ret	10	Ret	14	45
9	(France) Kévin Estre (R)	Graff Racing	6	10	6	4	Ret	Ret	4	8	12	7	6	6	11	45
10	(France) Sébastien Chardonnet	Epsilon Sport	12	5	4	8	10	4	8	Ret	8	Ret	9	11	Ret	34
11	(United Kingdom) Craig Dolby	Epsilon Sport	4	18	7	11	14	10	9	Ret	10	8	12	7	8	28
12	(France) Bastien Borget (R)	Graff Racing	8	21	Ret	Ret	6	Ret	11	12	9	5	8	13	11	21
13	(Switzerland) Gary Hirsch (R)	Graff Racing	15	23	Ret	10	7	Ret	Ret	9	4	9	Ret	Ret	Ret	19
14	(France) Nelson Panciatici	SG Formula	7	7	Ret	6	5	Ret								19
15	(United Kingdom) Alexander Sims (2)	Pole Services, Manor Competition			5	7	12	8	Ret	18	Ret			14	6	19
16	(United Kingdom) Duncan Tappy	Fortec Motorsport									2					13
17	(France) Edouard Texte (R)	SG Formula	16	11	Ret	DNS			Ret	4	Ret					8
18	(France) Kevin Van Heek	Pole Services	10	8												4
19	(United Kingdom) Alex Morgan (3)	Manor Competition, Fortec Motorsport									5			10	9	3
20	(Switzerland) Jonathan Hirschi	Boutsen Energy Racing					16	9								2
21	(United Kingdom) Riki Christodoulou	Fortec Motorsport									23			9	Ret	2
22	(France) Benjamin Lariche (R)	Graff Racing	19	12	12	12	13	13	13	11	20	10	18	Ret	16	1
NC	(France) Sylvain Milesi (C)	Racing Team Trajectoires	13	13	11	14	15	11	14	14		11	14	12	13	0
–	(France) Nicolas Marroc (4)	Pole Services, TCS Racing	14	15	13	15	17	12	12	13	Ret	12	13	16	17	0
–	(France) Stéphane Romecki (R)(C)	RBA Sport	17	17	14	16	18	Ret	15	19	17	13	15			0
–	(France) Stéphane Panepinto (R)(C)	Pole Services							Ret	15	13					0
–	(France) Jean-Michel Ogier (R)(C)	Team Palmyr	Ret	22	16	17	19	14			14	Ret	16	18	22	0
–	(France) Didier Colombat (R)(C)	Team Palmyr			17	20	21	Ret	16	16	21	14	DNS			0
–	(France) David Zollinger (R)	Team Palmyr	18	14												0
–	(France) Marc Cattaneo (R)(C)	Team Palmyr	20	25	18	18	20	15	17	15	16	16	19	20	18	0
–	(France) Jean-Marc Menahem (R)(C)	Team Palmyr	22	24	15	19	22	18			18	15	17	17	19	0
–	(United Kingdom) Paul Rees	Fortec Motorsport												15	15	0
–	(France) Pierre Giner	Racing Team Trajectoires									15					0
–	(France) Daniel Harout	Lycée d'Artagnan	16	16										19	20	0
–	(Belgium) Maxime Martin (R)	Boutsen Energy Racing					23	16								0
–	(France) Jean-Paul Coppens (R)	CD Sport	19	19												0
–	(France) Philippe Hottinguer	Team Palmyr									19			21	21	0
–	(France) Rodolphe Hauchard	RBA Sport	21	20												0
–	(Japan) Ryuji Yamamoto	Fortec Motorsport									22					0

- (1) = Pierre Combot race for Pole Service until Cram Competition in Magny-Cours WSR and Catalunya and Graff Racing in Magny-Cours.
- (2) = Alexander Sims race for Manor Competition since Val de Vienne round.
- (3) = Alex Morgan race for Manor Competition during Magny-Cours WSR event and for Fortec Motorsport during Catalunya round.
- (4) = Nicolas Marroc race for TCS Racing since Magny-Cours WSR event.

=== 2007 Formula Renault 2.0 UK season ===
==== 2007 Formula Renault 2.0 UK Winter Cup ====
The Formula Renault UK Winter Cup and Formula Renault BARC Winter Cup are held in same time, but with separated classification. Some drivers take part of the UK Winter Cup but are not eligible to score points as a non-MSA licence holder.

- Point system : 32, 28, 25, 22, 20, 18, 16, 14, 12, 11, 10, 9, 8, 7, 6, 5, 4, 3, 2, 1. In each race 1 point for Fastest lap, 1 point for Pole position.
- 2 races in each round between 30 miles and 30 minutes.

Pos	Driver	Team	(England) DON November 2–3		(England) CRO November 9–10		Points
Pos	Driver	Team	1	2	3	4	Points
1	(United Kingdom) Richard Singleton	Hillspeed Racing	1	4	3*	7	96
2	(United Kingdom) Riki Christodoulou	Fortec Motorsport	2*	2	9	4*	93
3	(United Kingdom) Adam Christodoulou	AKA Cobra	8	10	1	3	82
4	(Japan) Sho Hanawa	Apotex Scorpio Motorsport	6	6	8	2	79
5	(United Kingdom) Kris Loane	Manor Competition	3	1	5	Ret	78
6	(United Kingdom) Dean Stoneman	Alpine Motorsport	5	8	2	9	74
7	(Brazil) Adriano Buzaid	Fortec Motorsport	Ret	7	14	1	56
8	(Australia) Nathan Caratti	AKA Cobra	4	17	4	16	53
9	(United Kingdom) Andrew Meyrick	AMR	7	5	7	Ret	52
10	(United Kingdom) David McDonald	Eurotek Motorsport	9	13	11	13	38
11	(United Kingdom) Paul Rees	Fortec Motorsport	13	Ret	10	6	37
12	(South Africa) Marc Murray	Hitech Junior Team	Ret	12	6	11	37
13	(United Kingdom) Henry Surtees	Carlin Motorsport	Ret	9	12	8	35
14	(United Kingdom) Jon Lancaster	Hitech Junior Team	14	3*	Ret	Ret	33
15	(United Kingdom) Oliver Webb	Fortec Motorsport	Ret	11	13	10	29
16	(United Kingdom) Scott Jenkins	Mark Burdett Motorsport	11	16	15	14	28
17	(United Kingdom) Kieren Clark	Apotex Scorpio Motorsport	10	14	Ret	12	27
18	(South Korea) Sung-Hak Mun	Eurotek Motorsport	12	15	16	15	26
19	(United Kingdom) Alexander Sims	Manor Competition	Ret	Ret	Ret	5	20
Non-MSA licence drivers with their original finish position (Including both UK and BARC categories) :
NC	(Finland) Valtteri Bottas	AKA Cobra	1	1	1	2	–
NC	(Germany) Johannes Seidlitz	Mark Burdett Motorsport	16	14	7	Ret	–
NC	(Sweden) Fredrik Blomstedt	Mark Burdett Motorsport	14	19	13	17	–
NC	(Lebanon) Joe Ghanem	Carlin Motorsport	Ret	22	23	21	–

=== 2007 Formula Renault BARC FR2000 season ===
The season include 12 rounds in 8 venues. The final standing was established with the best 11 results of the season. A Club Class classification is also established for young drivers (see 2007 Formula Renault BARC Club Class season below), they participe on the same race as the FR2000 series

- Point system : 15, 12, 10, 8, 6, 5, 4, 3, 2, 1. In each race 1 point for Fastest lap and 1 point for Pole position.
- Races are between 30 miles and 30 minutes.

Pos	Driver	Team	(England) DON April 29	(England) CRO May 19–20		(England) OUL June 16	(England) SIL July 21–22		(England) SNE August 11–12		(England) BHI August 26–27		(England) THR September 16	(England) OUL September 29	Points (1)
Pos	Driver	Team	1	2	3	4	5	6	7	8	9	10	11	12	Points (1)
1	(United Kingdom) Hywel Lloyd	CF Racing	1	Ret	2*	1	4	1	2	7	10*	1	1	1	132
2	(United Kingdom) Dean Stoneman	Alpine Motorsport	4	Ret	1	2*	3	2	1	1*	2	3	4	3	131
3	(United Kingdom) Ollie Hancock	Mark Burdett Motorsport	5	6	3	4	1	10	3*	13	4	4	3	9	85
4	(United Kingdom) Rossi Worswick	Worswick Engineering Ltd.	6	1	4	Ret	2*	EX	Ret	2	1	Ret*	Ret	2*	83
5	(United Kingdom) Aaron Steele	Double M Racing	2*	3	6	Ret	5	3*	13	4	Ret	DNS	5	4	68
6	(United Kingdom) David McDonald	Eurotek Motorsport	7	4*	5	3	8	5	5	Ret	5	Ret	2*	Ret	65
7	(United Kingdom) Felix Fisher	Driver, Quantexe Racing	3	10	9	6	15	9	17	8	3	2	8		48
8	(United Kingdom) Craig Copeland	Falcon Motorsport					7	4	7	5	6	6	7		36
9	(South Korea) Sung-Hak Mun	Eurotek Motorsport	13	7	7		17	14	6	3	11	5	6	13	34
10	(United Kingdom) Kieren Clark	3K's Racing		12	13		6	8	4	6	9	7	Ret	7	31
11	(Estonia) Sten Pentus	Falcon Motorsport	10	2	11	Ret					7	9	9	5	27
12	(United Kingdom) Louis Hamilton-Smith	Jigsaw Engineering	9	5	12	10	9	6	8	12	Ret	DNS			19
13	(United Kingdom) Chris Dittmann	Hillspeed Racing	16	15	DNQ	Ret	11	7	9	9	12	8	10	6	19
14	(United Kingdom) Ash Davies	Taro Motorsport	19	8	DNS	7	Ret	15	11	Ret	8	10	14	8	14
15	(Oman) Ahmed Al Harthy	Hillspeed Racing	17	11	15	5	10	11	10	17	DNS	14	18	12	8
16	(United Kingdom) David Scott	DS Motorsport	8	13	8	9									8
17	(United Kingdom) Mark Gillibrand	Russell Racing	11	9	10	8	13	12	Ret	10	DNS	12	15	DNS	7
18	(France) Denis Autier	Mark Burdett Motorsport	12	DNQ	17	Ret			12	11				10	1
19	(United Kingdom) Chris Woodhouse	Driver	18	Ret	14		12	13							0
20	(United Kingdom) Robin Palmer	Falcon Motorsport	22				EX	18	16	19			16		0
21	(United Kingdom) Joshua Brooks	Boulevard Team Racing	20	14	19	DNS	20	19	15	16	DNS	11	12	11	0
22	(Bahrain) Mohammed Jalal Al A'ali	Middle East / Russell Racing		Ret	18	Ret	14	Ret	Ret	14	14	DNS			0
23	(United Kingdom) Craig Harris	Blackpool and the Fylde College	21			13			Ret	Ret				14	0
24	(Bahrain) Essa Yusuf Mohammed	Middle East / Russell Racing	Ret	15	16	11	18	16			15	15			0
25	(Bahrain) Menasheh Salman Idafar	Middle East / Russell Racing	15	Ret	DNS	12	16	Ret	Ret	DNS	13	13	17	Ret	0
26	(France) Pierre Renom	Mark Burdett Motorsport	14			Ret			14	15			11	Ret	0
27	(United Kingdom) Melvin Marshall	Hillspeed Racing				14	19	17							0
28	(United Kingdom) Lee Dwyer	SSS Motorsport							Ret	18	DNS	DNS	13	Ret	0

- (1) = Points include only the best 11 results.
- (2) = Felix Fisher race for Quantexe Racing since Round 7

Pos	Team	Points
1	CF Racing	132
2	Alpine Motorsport	131
3	Eurotek Motorsport	99
4	Mark Burdett Motorsport	86
5	Worswick Engineering Ltd.	83
6	Double M Racing	68
7	Falcon Motorsport	63
8	3K's Racing	31
9	Quantexe Racing	28
10	Hillspeed Racing	27
11	Driver	20
12	Jigsaw Engineering	19
13	Taro Motorsport	14
14	DS Motorsport	8
15	Russell Racing	7
16	Boulevard Team Racing	0
17	Middle East / Russell Racing	0
18	Blackpool and The Fylde College	0
19	SSS Motorsport	0

==== 2007 Formula Renault BARC Club Class season ====
The season include 12 rounds in 8 venues. The final standing was established with the best 11 results of the season. The Club Class category is raced in same time as the main Formula Renault BARC FR2000 series. The cars use Tatuus RC (97/98/99) or Mygale SJ99 chassis and are powered by Renault Laguna 2.0L 6 valves engine providing lower Horsepower than the FR2000 class.

- Point system : 15, 12, 10, 8, 6, 5, 4, 3, 2, 1. In each race 1 point for Fastest lap and 1 point for Pole position.
- Races are between 30 miles and 30 minutes.

Pos	Driver	Team	Chassis	Points (1)
1	(United Kingdom) Ian Pearson	Pearson Engineering Service	Tatuus	153
2	(United Kingdom) James Heffeman	JH Motorsport	Tatuus	81
3	(United Kingdom) Roberto Tirone	Reon Motorsport	Tatuus	79
4	(United Kingdom) Marcus Clutton	Mark Cluton Racing	Mygale SJ99	73
5	(United Kingdom) Iain Morton	Reon Motorsport	Tatuus	70
6	(United Kingdom) Adrian Dixon	Muzz Race	Tatuus	64
7	(United Kingdom) Fraser Smart	Driver	Tatuus	60
8	(United Kingdom) Bob Pearson	Pearson Engineering Service	Tatuus	58
9	(United Kingdom) Matthew Clark	Muze Race	Tatuus	40
10	(United Kingdom) Bill Allen	Driver	Tatuus	20
11	(United Kingdom) Steven Durrant	Driver, RPD Racing (2)	Tatuus	16
12	(United Kingdom) John Johnsen	Muzz Race	Tatuus	11
13	(United Kingdom) Jonathan Paddon	Reon Motorsport	Tatuus	4
14	(United Kingdom) Richard Taylor	RPT Racing	Tatuus	4

- (1) = Points include only the best 11 results.
- (2) = Steven Durrant race for RPD Racing since Round 5.

Pos	Team	Points
1	Pearson Engineering Service	211
2	Reon Motorsport	153
3	Driver	96
4	JH Motorsport	81
5	Muzz Race	75
6	Mark Cluton Racing	73
7	RPT Racing	4
8	RPD Racing	0

==== 2007 Formula Renault BARC Winter Cup ====
The Formula Renault BARC Winter Cup and Formula Renault UK Winter Cup are held in same time, but with separated classification.

- Point system : 15, 12, 10, 8, 6, 5, 4, 3, 2, 1. In each race 1 point for Fastest lap, 1 point for Pole position.
- 2 races in each round between 30 miles and 30 minutes.

Pos	Driver	Team	(England) DON November 2–3		(England) CRO November 9–10		Points
Pos	Driver	Team	1	2	3	4	Points
1	(United Kingdom) Hywel Lloyd	CF Racing	1*	1*	4	2	54
2	(United Kingdom) Brett Parris	HS Motorsport	2	3	1*	4	46
3	(Oman) Ahmed Al Harthy	Hillspeed Racing	3	Ret	3	3	30
4	(Estonia) Sten Pentus	Falcon Motorsport	4	Ret	Ret	1*	25
5	(Bahrain) Menasheh Idafar	Hillspeed Racing	Ret	2	2	Ret	24
6	(United Kingdom) Michael Lyons		7	4	7	6	21
7	(United Kingdom) Joshua Brooks	Boulevard Team Racing	5	5	5	Ret	18
8	(United Kingdom) Lee Dwyer	SSS Motorsport	Ret	6	6	5	16
9	(France) Damien Charveriat	Falcon Motorsport	6	Ret			5

=== 2007 Formula Renault 2.0 Italia season ===
- Point system : 32, 28, 24, 22, 20, 18, 16, 14, 12, 10, 8, 6, 4, 2, 1 for 15th. In each race 2 points for Fastest lap and 2 for Pole position.
- Races : 2 race by rounds length of 30 minutes each.

Pos	Driver	Team	(Italy) VAL March 31 April 1		(Italy) VAL May 12–13		(Belgium) SPA June 15–16		(Spain) VAL June 30 July 1		(Italy) MIS July 21–22		(Italy) MUG September 15–16		(Italy) MNZ October 13–14		Points
Pos	Driver	Team	1	2	3	4	5	6	7	8	9	10	11	12	13	14	Points
1	(Finland) Mika Mäki	Epsilon Red Bull Team	11	12	1	3	Ret	4	1*	3	6	29	1*	1	1	Ret	274
2	(Spain) Jaime Alguersuari	Epsilon Red Bull Team	12	5	Ret	1	18*	1	2	1	10	Ret	3	3	6	2	266
3	(New Zealand) Brendon Hartley	Epsilon Red Bull Team	4	3	2*	Ret	2	28	9	9	30*	8	Ret	2	4*	1	236
4	(Spain) Roberto Merhi	Jenzer Motorsport	5	14	10	5	1	5	8	5	4	4	Ret	DSQ	2	5	232
5	(Romania) Mihai Marinescu	Petrom District Racing AP	2	2	6	32	7	DNS	11	11	5	6	6	7	3	Ret	206
6	(Australia) Daniel Ricciardo	RP Motorsport	6	30	4	8	5	Ret	4	4	12	12	4	4	11	9	196
7	(United Kingdom) Martin Plowman	Prema Powerteam	3	4	8	7	3	11	12	13	11	3	15	15	8	7	184
8	(Netherlands) Henkie Waldschmidt	Prema Powerteam	1*	1*	3	2	Ret	DNS	Ret	18	Ret	Ret	10	10	7	6	184
9	(United Kingdom) Oliver Turvey	Jenzer Motorsport	14	27	5	6	11	Ret	6	10	2	2	5	6	Ret	23	176
10	(Monaco) Stefano Coletti	Epsilon Euskadi	21	Ret	24	Ret	16	8	Ret	8	1	1	2	5	Ret	4	164
11	(Switzerland) Fabio Leimer	Jenzer Motorsport	Ret	13	12	15	4	3	5	2	8	7	13	Ret	5	Ret	161
12	(Italy) Andrea Caldarelli	Prema Powerteam	9	7	7	Ret	13	2	14	Ret	3	Ret	8	8	13	8	150
13	(Brazil) Felipe Lapenna	BVM Minardi Team	7	6	9	4	10	Ret	7	7	9	9					134
14	(Brazil) César Ramos	BVM Minardi Team	8	28	Ret	14	8	7	15	25	13	5	Ret	18	10	3	106
15	(Italy) Daniel Zampieri	Cram Competition	15	10	Ret	11	12	6	Ret	12	14	13	7	17	12	19	80
16	(Italy) Daniel Mancinelli	CO2 Motorsport	20	Ret	DNS	16	6	9	3	6	7	10	Ret	14	14	Ret	78
17	(Spain) Aleix Alcaraz	Petrom District Racing AP	16	8	Ret	10	9	20	10	Ret	15	15	12	13			61
18	(Italy) Riccardo Cinti	It Loox Racing	16	11	14	31	17	Ret	17	28	17	19	Ret	9	9	Ret	34
19	(Germany) Patrick Kronenberger	RP Motorsport	18	16	33	30	34	10	16	14	18	17	9	12	16	Ret	31
20	(Italy) Michele Faccin	CO2 Motorsport	33	15	13	12	14	12	13	Ret	16	14	14	16	Ret	Ret	29
21	(Bulgaria) Simeon Ivanov	BVM Minardi Team	10	9	17	13	21	15	Ret	17	19	21	18	Ret	Ret	Ret	27
22	(Italy) Federico Muggia	It Loox Racing									Ret	11	11	11			24
23	(Italy) Niki Sebastiani	It Loox Racing	17	29	11	9											20
24	(Italy) Christian de Francesch	Team Dueppì	25	20	25	26			Ret	23	Ret	25	17	22	19	10	10
25	(Italy) Valerio Prandi	Viola Formula Racing	Ret	17	21	19	29	17	Ret	Ret	Ret	30	Ret	20	18	11	8
26	(Italy) Filippo Ponti	Team Dueppì											28	Ret	17	12	6
27	(Italy) Patrick Reiterer	AP Motorsport	Ret	Ret	Ret	27	15	13	Ret	16	20	Ret	Ret	DNS	23	18	5
28	(Italy) Glauco Junior Solieri	S.I.M. Racing Team											16	13			4
29	(Romania) Matei Mihaescu	CO2 Motorsport											Ret	25	25	13	4
30	(Spain) Miquel Julià Perello	Epsilon Euskadi	29	23	20	17	19	14	19	15	22	16	20	23	Ret	Ret	3
31	(San Marino) Paolo Meloni	W&D Racing Team	22	26	26	21	31	22	Ret	19	Ret	Ret	19	32	Ret	14	2
32	(Italy) Marco Betti	It Loox Racing	34	21	30	Ret	Ret	25	23	Ret	Ret	28	22	30	21	15	1
33	(Italy) Sergio Campana	Cram Competition	26	Ret	19	20	25	16	25	Ret	21	18	Ret	19	15	Ret	1
34	(Austria) Bianca Steiner	Steiner Motorsport	27	Ret	15	Ret	20	Ret			24	Ret	26	Ret	22	20	1
NC	(Italy) Alessia Belometti	AP Motorsport							Ret	Ret	25	Ret			Ret	Ret	0
NC	(Italy) Stefano Bizzarri	It Loox Racing, Racing Box	28	22	22	Ret	30	24	20	Ret	26	20			24	Ret	0
NC	(Italy) Umberto Emanuel Bizzarri	Facondini Racing											21	21			0
NC	(Italy) Gianluca Colombo	Tomcat Racing	30	24	29	28	32	Ret	Ret	24	23	27	23	Ret	20	21	0
NC	(Italy) Giammarco D'Alelio	Facondini Racing	Ret	Ret	28	22	33	Ret	22	DNS							0
NC	(United Kingdom) Craig Dolby	It Loox Racing					23	23									0
NC	(Italy) Federico Leo	RP Motorsport	19	Ret	18	Ret	Ret	Ret	21	22	27	24	25	26	27	17	0
NC	(Spain) Pablo Montilla	Epsilon Euskadi	32	25	32	23	Ret	26	24	27	29	26	Ret	28	Ret	Ret	0
NC	(Italy) Giovanni Nava	Cram Competition	23	18	16	18	26	19	18	21	Ret	23	27	29			0
NC	(Venezuela) Bruno René Orioli	Privateer			23	29	21	27									0
NC	(Italy) Andrea Pellizzato	Cram Competition													29	DNS	0
NC	(Italy) Luca Persiani	It Loox Racing													26	Ret	0
NC	(Monaco) Stéphane Richelmi	Thierry Boutsen Racing					24	18									0
NC	(Italy) Andrea Roda	Tomcat Racing	31	Ret	31	24	Ret	DNS	Ret	26	28	31	29	31	28	22	0
NC	(Netherlands) Frank Suntjens	Speed Lover					28	Ret									0
NC	(Norway) Pål Varhaug	Jenzer Motorsport											24	27			0
NC	(Italy) Nicola Zonzini	Cram Competition	24	19	27	25	27	21	Ret	20	31	22	16	24	Ret	16	0

Pos	Team	Points
1	Cram Competition	674
2	Jenzer Motorsport	518
3	Prema Powerteam	358
4	It Loox Racing	188
5	RP Motorsport	78
6	CO2 Motorsport	64
7	BVM Minardi Team	56
8	AP Motorsport	48
9	Euronova Racing	30
10	Facondini Racing	26
11	Tomcat Racing	2

==== 2007 Formula Renault 2.0 Italia Winter Series ====
César Ramos realize the perfect Winter Series with 4 wins, 4 Pole positions and 4 fastest laps.

- The same point system is used with 2 points for Fasted lap and 2 points for Pole position.

Pos	Driver	Team	(Italy) VAL November 10–11		(Italy) VAL November 17–18		Points
Pos	Driver	Team	1	2	3	4	Points
1	(Brazil) César Ramos	BVM Minardi Team	1*	1*	1*	1*	144
2	(Italy) Daniel Zampieri	Cram Competition	6	5	5	2	86
3	(Italy) Fabio Onidi	RP Motorsport	3	4	3	7	86
4	(Italy) Riccardo Cinti	Riccardo Cinti	4	2	11	4	80
5	(Italy) Niki Sebastiani	It Loox Racing	2	Ret	6	3	70
6	(Italy) Federico Rossi	CO2 Motorsport			2	6	46
7	(Spain) Genís Olivé	Cram Competition	10	6	10	11	46
8	(Italy) Salvatore Cicatelli	Viola Formula Racing	Ret	10	4	9	44
9	(Italy) Valentino Sebastiani	It Loox Racing	5	16	16	5	40
10	(Spain) Roberto Merhi	BVM Minardi Team	8	3			38
11	(Italy) Stefano Bizzarri	RP Motorsport	9	9	Ret	8	38
12	(Italy) Mirko Bortolotti	Tomcat Racing	12	11	8	12	34
13	(Spain) Miquel Monrás	Cram Competition	13	14	7	10	32
14	(Italy) Nicola Zonzini	Cram Competition	7	15	9	14	31
15	(Bulgaria) Simeon Ivanov	BVM Minardi Team	11	7			24
16	(Italy) Alberto Cola	AP Motorsport	17	8	15	13	19
17	(Italy) Andrea Roda	Tomcat Racing	15	13	13	Ret	9
18	(Italy) Alessia Belometti	AP Motorsport	16	12	14	Ret	8
19	(Switzerland) Stefano Comini	CO2 Motorsport			12	16	6
20	(Italy) Andrea Borio	Facondini Racing	14	Ret	Ret	15	3

=== 2007 LO Formule Renault 2.0 Suisse season ===
- Point system : 25, 22, 20, 18, 16, 14, 12, 10, 8, 6, 5, 4, 3, 2, 1 for 15th. Extra 2 points for Fastest lap and 3 points for Pole position.
- Races : 2 race by rounds.

Pos	Driver	Team	(France) DIJ April 7–8		(Germany) HOC April 28–29		(Italy) VAR May 12–13		(Czech Republic) MOS May 26–27		(France) MAG August 11–12		(Austria) SAL September 29–30		Points
Pos	Driver	Team	1	2	3	4	5	6	7	8	9	10	11	12	Points
1	(Czech Republic) Adam Kout	Bossy Racing Team	2	1	2	2*	7	7	3	1*	3*	5	4	3*	242
2	(Norway) Pål Varhaug	Jenzer Motorsport	4	5	1	4	18	13	2	2	1	1	2*	1	232
3	(Italy) Federico Rossi	CO2 Motorsport	Ret	2	5	1	1*	2*	Ret	3	2	4	DSQ	2	211
4	(Switzerland) Ronnie Theiler	Jenzer Motorsport	3	4	3	5	4	3	6	DNS	5	3	1	4	208
5	(Italy) Michele Faccin	CO2 Motorsport	1*	3*	6*	3			1*	9	10	2*	Ret	7	168
6	(Romania) Matei Mihaescu	CO2 Motorsport	6	DNS	4	6	2	1	5	4	8	6	DSQ	11	159
7	(Switzerland) Simon Trummer	BMS Böhlen Motorsport	22	11	7	8	8	4	8	6	7	7	Ret	6	119
8	(Italy) Gianmarco Voltan	AS Dynamic Engineering	9	8			5	9	Ret	5	4	25			76
9	(Switzerland) Florian Lachat	Jenzer Motorsport	7	7	12	Ret	Ret	Ret	4	DNS	16	11	Ret	5	67
10	(Argentina) Francisco Viel Bugliotti	Tomcat Racing	5	10	Ret	10	17	5 (1)	9	7	Ret	Ret	Ret	8	60
11	(Italy) Antonino Pellegrino	Scuderia Antonino Racing	12	12	8	7	10	6	DNS	17	13	10			59
12	(Switzerland) Fabien Thuner	Jenzer Motorsport	8	9	Ret	22					6	26	5	9	56
13	(Switzerland) Thomas Amweg	Equipe Bernoise	28	DNS	10	13	6	11	DNS	12	11	12	7	18	53
14	(Switzerland) Kurt Böhlen	BMS Böhlen Motorsport	10	13	11	14	Ret	Ret	Ret	10	14	14	6	12	44
15	(Italy) Marco Visconti	AS Dynamic Engineering	13	14	15	15	9	8	10	8					43
16	(France) Axel Spilthooren	CO2 Motorsport	18	6	Ret	11	3	Ret	DNS	DNS	25	27	Ret	15	40
17	(Switzerland) Stefano Comini	Pietro Comini									9	8	3	Ret	38
18	(Italy) Antonio Loprieno	Emmebi Motorsport	11	DNS	13	12	Ret	12	11	DNS	Ret	24			22
19	(Switzerland) Christopher Zanella	Jenzer Motorsport									18	9	10	10	20
20	(Switzerland) Devis Schwägli	BMS Böhlen Motorsport	17	15	9	9					29	DNS	Ret	13	20
21	(Italy) Pietro Gandolfi	Emmebi Motorsport	26	Ret	Ret	21	16	19	12	11	Ret	Ret	13	20	12
22	(Italy) Andrea Marra	Linerace Technology	16	16	Ret	17	Ret	15	13	13	23	23	11	17	12
23	(Italy) Alberto Bassi	AS Dynamic Engineering	24	21	14	16	Ret	10	Ret	15	15	17			10
24	(Italy) Piergiorgio Capra	Dueppi Team									24	20	8	21	10
25	(Italy) Federico Gibbin	Linerace Technology	21	18	Ret	Ret	11	Ret	DNS	19	19	13	Ret	14	10
26	(Italy) Alessia Belometti	AP Motorsport	15	DSQ	16	24	Ret	Ret	12	14	27	28			8
27	(Italy) Leonardo Geraci	Dueppi Team									17	16	9	16	8
28	(Switzerland) Beat Wittwer	Jenzer Motorsport	19	DNS	Ret	18	12	Ret			20	18	12	19	8
29	(Italy) Andrea Roda	Tomcat Racing	14	17							12	15			7
30	(Czech Republic) Jakub Knoll	Bossy Racing Team	23	20	Ret	20	15	16	15	20	21	Ret	14	Ret	4
31	(Italy) Laura Polidori	Dueppi Team	27	23			14	17	14	16	28	22			4
32	(Italy) Flavio Mattara	Gialloracing	DNS	Ret	17	Ret	13	18			26	Ret			3
33	(Italy) Jacopo Pellegrino	Living Kart Club	25	22	Ret	23	Ret	14	DNS	18					2
34	(Italy) Emanuel Favale	Dueppi Team									30	Ret	15	22	1
35	(Netherlands) Frank Suntjens	Speed Lover	20	19	Ret	19					Ret	19			0
36	(Switzerland) Steve Brodbeck										22	21			0
Non championship drivers with their original finish position
NC	(Germany) Keller Thomas	Conrad Racing Sport			13	22									–
NC	(Hungary) Istvan Tukora	TR Motorsport			19	20			DNS	16					–
NC	(Hungary) Peter Gyuricza	TR Motorsport			Ret	Ret									–
NC	(Austria) Christopher Lammel	TR Motorsport							DNS						–

- (1) = Francisco Viel Bugliotto was penalized and receive only 2 points for its 5th.

Pos	Team	Points
1	Jenzer Motorsport	591
2	CO2 Motorsport	578
3	Bossy Racing Team	246
4	BMS Böhlen Motorsport	183
5	AS Dynamic Engineering	129
6	Tomcat Racing	67
7	Scuderia Antonino Racing	59
8	Equipe Bernoise	53
9	Pietro Comini	38
10	Emmebi Motorsport	34
11	Dueppi Team	22
12	Linerace Technology	10
13	AP Motorsport	8
14	Gialloracing	3
15	Living Kart Club	2
16	Speed Lover	0

=== 2007 Formula Renault 2000 de America season ===
- Point system : 30, 24, 20, 16, 12, 10, 8, 6, 4, 2 for 10th. Extra 2 points for Fastest lap and 2 points for Pole position.

On May 13, a race in El Salvador and on January 27, 2008, a race in Puebla, Mexico were planned but cancelled.

Pos	Driver	Team	(Mexico) MEX March 24–25		(Guatemala) VOL May 6	(Costa Rica) GUA June 3	(Ecuador) YAH July 29	(Colombia) TOC October 6–7		(Puerto Rico) PON November 10–11		Points
Pos	Driver	Team	1	2	3	4	5	6	7	8	9	Points
1	(Mexico) Hugo Oliveras	FedEx-Citizen	1*	4	4	2*	3	2	8	1	1*	212
2	(Venezuela) Giancarlo Serenelli	RE Racing	3	3	Ret	7	1	3*	1	2	3	178
3	(Mexico) Alfonso Toledano Jr.	FedEx-Citizen	2	1	1	5	4	5	10	4	DNS	144
4	(Mexico) G. Iván González	Estral-Único	6	6	13	3	5	7	2	10	5	98
5	(Mexico) Arturo González	Estral-Único			3*		6	8	5	Ret	4	64
6	(Costa Rica) Javier Collado	Greatwall-ELK				1	8	9	3			60
7	(Mexico) Fidencio Guzmán	Dynamic Kumho Tires	8	17	2	9	9	Ret	Ret	8	9	48
8	(Colombia) Juan Esteban Jacobo	Roshfrans-Único	17	Ret	6	Ret	Ret	6	Ret	3*	10	46
9	(Colombia) Juan M. González	Zeus Único	10	DNS	5	19	Ret	1	15			44
10	(Mexico) Arturo González	Jim Bean-Sauza	4	2*		11						42
11	(Mexico) Arturo Hernández	RE Racing	Ret	5			2*					38
12	(Colombia) Sebastián Martínez	Parteam	13	12	9	15	12	4	14	5	8	38
13	(Colombia) Steven Guerrero	no team name A						16	7	Ret	2	32
14	(South Africa) Wesleigh Orr	Cortinas	7	Ret	Ret	4						24
15	(Colombia) Jonathan Gutiérrez	Parteam	15	11	Ret	17	15	10	13	6	6	22
16	(Mexico) Carlos Arellano	SSN/ RE Racing	5	7		12						20
17	(Mexico) Piero Rodarte	Seman Baker				8	6					16
18	(Colombia) Omar Leal	no team name A						Ret	4			16
19	(Mexico) David Farías	Daewoo/RE Racing	11	8	7	Ret	13					14
20	(Colombia) Julián Martínez	Parteam	12	16	12	20	Ret	12	6*	Ret	DNS	12
21	(Mexico) Alejandro Cortinas	Cortinas	16	15	14	14	16	13	9	7	DNS	12
22	(Mexico) Oscar Hidalgo	JL Racing				6	10					12
23	(Mexico) Javier Echeverria	no team name B					14	11	11	9	7	12
24	(Colombia) Juliana González Bermudez	Único	9	9								8
25	(Mexico) Jorge Alarcón	FedEx-Citizen	14	13	8	18						6
26	(Costa Rica) Charly Fonseca	Unico Hipermas				10						2
27	(Mexico) Enrique Baca Amador	Dynamic Kumho Tires	18	10	Ret	16						2
28	(Guatemala) George Hazbun	no team name A			10							2
29	(Guatemala) Diego Cuestas	Movistar			15	13						0
30	(Mexico) Ernesto Martínez	no team name B					17					0
31	(Mexico) Carlos Sixtos	no team name B	DNS	14								0
32	(Ecuador) Henry Taleb	no team name B					11					0
33	(Mexico) Pablo Campos	Jim Bean-Sauza			Ret	21						0
34	(Mexico) Jorge Seman	Seman Baker			Ret							0
35	(Mexico) Alfredo Mena	no team name A						14	Ret	Ret	DNS	0
36	(Mexico) Juan Carlos Sistos	no team name A						15	12	Ret	DNS	0
37	(Guatemala) Ramón Zaghi	no team name A			11							0

Pos	Team	Points
1	FedEx Citizen	362
2	RE Racing	216
3	Estral-Único	162
4	Parteam	72
5	Greatwall-ELK	60
6	no team name A	50
7	Dynamic Kumho Tires	50
8	Roshfrans-Único	46
9	Zeus Único	44
10	Jim Bean-Sauza	42
11	Cortinas	36
12	SSN/ RE Racing	20
13	Seman Baker	16
14	Daewoo/RE Racing	14
15	no team name B	12
16	JL Racing	12
17	Único	8
18	Unico Hipermas	2
19	Movistar	0

=== 2007 Formula TR 2000 Pro Series season ===
- Point system : 30, 28, 26, 24, 22, 20, 18, 16, 14, 12, 10, 8, 6, 4, 2, 2, 2, 2, 2, 2 for 20th. Extra 1 point for Fastest lap and 1 point for Pole position. The points system change since Round 13 :
  - The points are double in Round 13 and 14 as: 60, 56, 52, 48, 44, 40, 36, 32, 28, 20, 16, 12, 8, 4, 4, 4, 4, 4, 4 for 20th and 2 for fastest lap, 2 for Pole position.
  - Rounds since 15: ?.
- All entry driver receive 1 point in each venue if they register five days before race.
- Races : 2 race by rounds. Each race length of 9 to 16 laps and use rolling start.

Pos	Driver	Team	(United States) CAL March 10–11		(United States) CAL March 17–18		(United States) WIL May 5–6		(United States) CAL June 2–3		(United States) BUT June 9–10		(United States) MIL July 13–14		(United States) WIL August 11–12		(United States) MIL September 14–15		(United States) VEG October 13–14		(United States) BUT November 10		Points
Pos	Driver	Team	1	2	3	4	5	6	7	8	9	10	11	12	13	14	15	16	17	18	19	10	Points
1	(United States) Bill Goshen	Goshen Racing	9*	1*	2	3	10*	2*	2*	1*	4	2	1	1*	1*	1*	1*	3*	2*	3*	2	4	739
2	(United States) John Knudsen	Knudsen Racing	1	3	1*	1	3	5	1	4	3	3	7*	3	3	5	2	1	1	1	5	3	713
3	(United States) Luis Martinez Jr.	Position One Motorsports	2	2	3	2*	9	4	Ret	5	2	1*	5	10	5	4	4	4	4	2	1*	1*	652
4	(United States) Liam Kenney	Liam Kenney Motorsports	10	4	9	Ret	1	1	3	2	1*	6	2	2	2	2	3	5	3	5	4	2	648
5	(United States) Christian Franck	Knudsen Racing	4	10	4	8	4	6	5	3	6	4	4	4	4	3	5	2	5	4	3	5	614
6	(United States) Jim Booth	Knudsen Racing	6	7	5	4	8	10	8	7	8	5	8	8	6	6	10	8	8	8	6	6	484
7	(United States) Kerry Lynch	Knudsen Racing	7	8	8	7	5	8	9	9	7	8	9	7	7	7	9	10	7	7	7	7	460
8	(United States) Dino Bruno	Team Bruno	3	6	7	6	6 (b)	7	6	8	6 (b)	6					8	6	6	6			323
9	(United States) Jeremy Braun	Kimball Williams Racing					2	3	4 (b)	11	5	7	3	5									179
10	(United States) Bob Siska	Siska Racing	5	5	6	5	Ret	11	7	6	9						11	9					153
11	(United States) Paul Mashouf	Paladin Motorsports	8	9			7 (b)	9	10	10			Ret	9									103
12	(United States) Bruce Binnquist	Goshen Racing															6	7					40
13	(United States) Dustin Welch	Welch Racing															7	11					32

- (b) = No Bonus point for late registering.

Pos	Team	Points
1	Knudsen Racing	2271
2	Goshen Racing	779
3	Position One Motorsports	652
4	Liam Kenney Motorsports	648
5	Team Bruno	323
6	Kimball Williams Racing	179
7	Siska Racing	153
8	Paladin Motorsports	103
9	Welch Racing	32

=== 2007 Asian Formula Renault Challenge season ===
- Point system : 30, 24, 20, 17, 15, 13, 11, 9, 7, 5, 4, 3, 2, 1. No points for Fastest lap or Pole position. Drivers that race less than 5 rounds don't receive any points for the final standing. The team point attribution is different from the driver point system : 10, 8, 6, 5, 4, 3, 2, 1.
- Races : 2 races by rounds.

The Asian Challenge Category (A) reward the best asian driver. The China Formula Renault Challenge (C) reward the best driver including only rounds held on China. The table indicate the final position of the race including all drivers and categories but total points are based on results according to participating categories of each driver.

Pos	Driver	Team	(China) ZHU May 2		(Malaysia) SEP June 23–24		(China) BEI August 5		(China) SHA September 2		(China) ZHU September 23		(China) BEI October 14		(China) SHA November 25		Points	Points (C)	Points (A)
Pos	Driver	Team	1	2	3	4	5	6	7	8	9	10	11	12	13	14	Points	Points (C)	Points (A)
1	(Finland) Pekka Saarinen	PS Racing	1*	3*	Ret	4	1*	1*	1*	1*	1*	1	1*	1*	Ret	Ret	307	290	
2	(Switzerland) Alexandre Imperatori	Asia Racing Team	3	1	2	2	4	Ret	2	2	Ret	5*	5	2	2	Ret	244	196	
3	(Argentina) Maximiliano Baumgartner	March 3 Racing	4	2	3	3	3	8	4	3	8	8	6	3	Ret	8	207	167	
4	(Sweden) Felix Rosenqvist	March 3 Racing	21	Ret	Ret	10	10	6	3	4	2	2	3	6	1*	3*	193	186	
5	(France) Mathias Beche	Asia Racing Team	6	6	4	5	2	2	5	Ret	15	11	4	Ret	4	1	190	158	
6	(China) Jim Ka To	Shangsai FRD Team	5	4	14	6	7	3	15	8	7	7	8	4	8	9	152	136	349
7	(Thailand) Chawakij Boughey	March 3 Racing	12	7	Ret	9	6	5	9	5	6	12	7	Ret	7	4	134	125	333
8	(Sweden) Fredrik Blomstedt	March 3 Racing	18	17	11	Ret	15	12	7	7	3	6	2	Ret	10	2	116	111	
9	(China) Geoffrey Kwong	PS Racing	8	5	10	14	8	Ret	Ret	13	5	3	DNS	8	6	6	115	105	
10	(Spain) José Luis López-Pampló	March 3 Racing	Ret	13	5	13	9	4	13	Ret	9	10	DSQ	11	5	5	96	77	
11	(Finland) Markus Niemelä	March 3 Racing	2	14	1	1											87	27	
12	(China) Jian-Wei Wang	March 3 Racing	22	11	Ret	11	12	7	10	10	4	4	10	7			86	81	226
13	(France) Benjamin Rouget	Asia Racing Team	9	25	8	Ret	5	10	8	9	11	9	Ret	10			70	61	
14	(Angola) Luís Sá Silva	Champ Motorsport	Ret	16	Ret	21	13	Ret	6	6	12	17			3	7	64	64	
15	(Australia) Mark Williamson	Dyna Ten Motorsports	7	9	6	7	16	11	12	12			11	9	13	Ret	59	35	
16	(Japan) Yuki Iwasaki	Dyna Ten Motorsports	14	23	Ret	15	11	Ret	14	11	10	Ret	9	5	9	11	53	51	198
17	(China) Zhang Zhen Dong	Asia Racing Team	13	12	18	22	14	13	11	14	14	14	12	Ret	14	12	33	31	205
18	(Japan) Hajime Sugino	Asia Racing Team			7	Ret	17	9	DNS	DNS					12	Ret	22	11	77
19	(Colombia) Alexis Sabet Echavarria	PS Racing	15	20	13	Ret											6	2	
20	(Indonesia) Allida Alexandra Asmasoebrata	Indonesia Inc. Racing Team	19	21	19	16	19	14									3	1	76
21	(Taiwan) Jimmy Lin	PTRS Racing	17	15													3	3	30
NC	(United States) MacKenzie Johnson	PTRS Racing	20	Ret													0	0	
NC	(Japan) Yoshitaka Kuroda	Shangsai FRD Team	11	8	9	8												0	48
NC	(Finland) Dede Npwp Widhagdo	Asia Racing Team									13	13						0	
NC	(Macau) Jo Rosa Merszei	Champ Motorsport			17	19													28
NC	(Canada) Wayne Shen	Modena Motorsports	16	18	12	12													
NC	(Netherlands) Francis Tjia	Modena Motorsports	10	Ret	15	17													
NC	(Canada) Christian Chia	Modena Motorsports			Ret	20													
NC	(China) Hau Woon Yung	Shangsai FRD Team							Ret	15	21	Ret							
NC	(China) Samson Chan	Ghiasports Racing Team									16	16							
NC	(Canada) John Shen	Modena Motorsports	23	22	16	18													
NC	(Israel) Eitan Zidkilov	Dyna Ten Motorsports	Ret	10			18	DNS											
NC	(Philippines) Mark Bumgarner	Asia Racing Team													Ret	10			
NC	(China) Zhu Dai Wei														11	13			
NC	(Finland) Laura Koivuluoma	PS Racing											13	12					
NC	(Macau) Lou Meng Cheong	Champ Motorsport									18	15							
NC	(Macau) Filipe Clemente	Champ Motorsport									17	18							
NC	(Macau) Kam Sam Lam	Champ Motorsport									19	19							
NC	(China) Douglas Moore	Asia Racing Team									20	Ret							
NC	(China) Kai Yiu Chan	Ghiasports Racing Team	Ret	19															
NC	(China) Victor Yung	Shangsai FRD Team	24	24															
NC	(Macau) Chi Ho Leung	Champ Motorsport									Ret	Ret							

Pos	Team	Points	Points (C)	Points (A)
1	M3 Racing Team	126	106	126
2	Asia Racing Team	107	91	85
3	PS Racing	100	89	
4	Shangsai FRD Team	60	51	105
5	Dyna Ten Motorsports	53	43	60
6	Champ Motorsport	22	33	10
7	Indonesia Ind Racing Team	9	3	26
8	PTRS Racing	6	6	9
9	Ghiasports Racing Team	0	0	
10	Modena Motorsports	0	0	

== Formula Renault 1.6L ==
=== 2007 Championnat de France FFSA Formule Campus Renault Elf season ===
This is the last season of the Championnat de France Formule Campus Renault Elf replaced by Formul’Academy Euro Series in 2008.

- Point system : ?

Pos	Driver	Team	Points
1	(France) Jean-Éric Vergne		189
2	(France) Fabien Rosier		100
3	(France) Kévin Breysse		97
4	(Ecuador) Miguel Villagomez		72
5	(France) Antoine Cassaignes		71
6	(France) Jim Pla		70.5
7	(France) Maxime Jousse		69
8	(France) Antony Tardieu		68
9	(Guatemala) Richard Campollo		54
10	(United Arab Emirates) Ramez Azzam		46.5
11	(Ecuador) Diego Vazquez		46
12	(Costa Rica) Amadéo Quiros		32
13	(Ecuador) Juan Fernando Cevallos		26
14	(Costa Rica) José Andrès Montalto		18
15	(Venezuela) Jorge Andrès Goncalvez		18
16	(France) Rémi Boudoul		14
17	(United Arab Emirates) Thani Bin Thani		14
18	(United Arab Emirates) Mohammed Al Abdooli		11
19	(France) Alexis Gerdil		7
20	(France) Rodolphe Amyot		7
21	(Dominican Republic) Jonathan De Castro		6
22	(France) Aurore Launay		1
23	(United Arab Emirates) Khalid Al Mutawaa		1
24	(Colombia) Esteban Yanguas		0.5
25	(France) Thibault Bernard		0
26	(France) Christophe Charrier		0
27	(France) François Guillet-Arnaud		0

=== 2007 Formula Renault 1.6 Belgium season ===
The Belgian series is held on 6 venues, 2 races by venues. In 2007, the championship use Zolder (venue 1, 2 and 4), Dijon-Prenois (venue 3) and Spa (venues 5 and 6) circuits. Each round duration is 20 minutes.

- Point system : 20, 17, 15, 13, 11, 10, 9, 8, 7, 6, 5, 4, 3, 2, 1 for 15th. Extra 1 point for Fastest lap and 2 points for Pole position.

Pos	Driver	Team	Points
1	(Latvia) Karlīne Štāla	Astromega Racing	178
2	(Belgium) Niels Cox	Tof Racing	176
3	(Luxembourg) Gary Hauser	Racing Experience	157
4	(Belgium) Kevin Demaerschalk	Stroek Motorsport	138
5	(Belgium) David de Saeger	Delahaye Racing	132
6	(Romania) Doru Sechelariu	Boutsen Energy Racing	127
7	(France) Jean-Philippe Grandsire	Racing Experience	98
8	(United Kingdom) Jack Piper	Astromega Racing	89
9	(Belgium) Eddy Roosens	Speed Racing	71
10	(Belgium) Yannick Roggeman	Stroek Motorsport	68
11	(Germany) Jürgen Elbracht	Racing Experience	59
12	(Belgium) Valerie Theuwissen	Theuwissen-Racing	56
13	(Belgium) Nicolas de Crem	Patrick Païez Progress	51
14	(Belgium) Jordy Dodemont	Tof Racing	36
15	(Belgium) Nicolas Dervisaj	Delahaye Racing	20
NC	(United States) Eliott Bachelart	Patrick Païez Progress	0
–	(France) Kévin Cuoco	Patrick Païez Progress	0
–	(Belgium) Mathias Grooten	Stroek Motorsport	0
–	(France) Côme Ledogar	Boutsen Energy Racing	0
–	(France) Arthur Pic	Boutsen Energy Racing	0

Pos	Team	Points
1	Racing Experience	314
2	Astromega Racing	267
3	Tof Racing	212
4	Stroek Motorsport	206
5	Delahaye Racing	152
6	Boutsen Energy Racing	127
7	Speed Racing	71
8	Theuwissen-Racing	56
9	Patrick Païez Progress	51

=== 2007 Formula Renault 1.6 Argentina season ===
The cars use various chassis like Tito or Tulia. The contest consists of 13 races on 13 different venues : Comodoro Rivadavia, Parque Ciudad, Autódromo Ezequiel Crisol, Autódromo Jorge Ángel Pena, El Zonda - Eduardo Copello, Autódromo Oscar Cabalén, Callejero de Santa Fe, Las Paredes, Viedma, Autódromo Oscar Alfredo Gálvez, Oberá, Autódromo Rosendo Hernández and the last in Circuito callejero de Punta del Este, Uruguay.

- Point system : 20, 15, 12, 10, 8, 6, 4, 3, 2, 1 for 10th. 1 extra point for Pole position.

Pos	Driver	Team	Points
1	(Argentina) Mariano Werner	Werner Jr.	236
2	(Argentina) Guido Falaschi	Sportteam Formula	132
3	(Argentina) Matías Muñoz Marchesi	Werner Competición	99
4	(Argentina) Agustín Miotti	Sportteam Formula	84
5	(Argentina) Kevin Icardi	G.F. Racing	73
6	(Argentina) Facundo Ardusso	Werner Competición	58
7	(Argentina) Bernardo Llaver	G.F. Racing	56
8	(Argentina) Ezequiel Tudesco	Kern Racing Formula, Werner Jr.	42
9	(Argentina) Emanuel Bailheres	Werner Competición	42
10	(Argentina) Francisco Troncoso	Mara Competición	38
11	(Argentina) Damián Cassino	NQN Sport	32
12	(Argentina) Martín Serrano	G.F. Racing	21
13	(Argentina) Damián Fineschi	Fineschi Racing	21
14	(Argentina) Rodrigo Rogani	Litoral	21
15	(Argentina) Nicolas Outerino	Bouvier Racing	19
16	(Chile) Kevin Toledo	Bouvier Racing	18
17	(Argentina) Franco Vivian	Kali Formula	15
18	(Argentina) Ignacio Vivian	Kali Formula	12
19	(Chile) Ramiro Scuncio	Satorra	9
20	(Argentina) Federico Moises	Mara Competición	9
21	(Argentina) Esteban Sarry	Werner Competición	8
22	(Argentina) Francisco Viel Bugliotto	Werner Competición	6
23	(Uruguay) Giordano Hernandez	GLS	4
24	(Argentina) Gustavo Micheloud	Mara Competición	3
25	(Argentina) Nicolas Diaz	ND Racing	3
26	(Argentina) Marcos Ortiz	Lanus Motorsport	3
27	(Argentina) Juan Benedetti	Bouvier Racing	1
28	(Argentina) Carlos Perdomo Varela	JLS Racing	1
29	(Argentina) Martin Gopcevich	TP Racing	0
30	(Argentina) Matias Sacne	Mara Competición	0
31	(Argentina) Leonel Sotro	D'Ambrosio Car	0
NC	(Argentina) Fernando Barrere	NQN Sport	0
–	(Argentina) Juan Barucca	JLS Racing	0
–	(Argentina) Franco Bosio	Litoral	0
–	(Argentina) Matias Caceres	GR Sport	0
–	(Ecuador) Juan Fernando Cevallos	JLS Racing	0
–	(Argentina) Juan Jose Conde	RE Competición	0
–	(Argentina) Hernan Costa	Werner Competición	0
–	(Argentina) Juan Cruz Davila	Croizet	0
–	(Argentina) Ezequiel Dregin	D'Ambrosio Car	0
–	(Argentina) Maximiliano Fontana	GR Sport	0
–	(Argentina) Damian Mari	GR Sport	0

Pos	Team	Points
1	Werner Jr.	236
2	Sportteam Formula	216
3	Werner Competición	171
4	G.F. Racing	150
5	Mara Competición	50
6	Bouvier Racing	38
7	NQN Sport	32
8	Kali Formula	27
9	Fineschi Racing	21
10	Litoral	21
11	Satorra	9
12	GLS	4
13	ND Racing	3
14	Lanus Motorsport	3
15	JLS Racing	1
?	Kern Racing Formula	42?
NC	TP Racing	0
NC	D'Ambrosio Car	0
NC	GR Sport	0
NC	RE Competición	0
NC	Croizet	0

=== 2007 PanamGPSeries Formula 1600 Junior season ===
The PanamGPSeries Formula 1600 Junior is held with the Formula de America 2000 on the same 9 races. The same point system is used.

Pos	Driver	Team	Points
1	(Mexico) Gerardo Nieto		266
2	(Mexico) Julian Albarracin		136
3	(Mexico) Andres Pulido		122
4	(Mexico) Oscar Kuri		122
5	(Mexico) Francisco Diaz		122
6	(Mexico) Jose Cortinas		78
7	(Mexico) Raul Sanchez		58
8	(Mexico) Enrique Vazquez		54
9	(Mexico) Julian Martinez		36
10	(Mexico) Felipe Vargas		20
...	...	...	...

Pos	Team	Points
...	...	...

=== 2007 Formula TR 1600 Pro Series season ===
The Formula TR 1600 Pro Series is held with the Formula TR 2000 Pro Series on 20 rounds. The same point system is used.

Pos	Driver	Team	Points
1	(United States) Ryan Booth	Knudsen Racing	714
2	(United States) Sergio Pena	JP Motorsports	712
3	(United States) Joshua Goshen	Goshen Racing	688
4	(United States) Kristin Braun	JP Motorsports	310
5	(United States) Andrew Zimmer	JP Motorsports	212
6	(United States) Felice Snider	JP Motorsports	186
7	(United States) Kerstin Smutny	Paladin Motorsports	120
8	(Colombia) Carlos Muñoz	JP Motorsports	72
9	(United States) Jesus Vasquez	Position One Motorsports	52
10	(United States) Chris Keller	JP Motorsports	50
11	(Brazil) Jonatan Jorge	JP Motorsports	0

Pos	Team	Points
1	JP Motorsports	1542
2	Knudsen Racing	714
3	Goshen Racing	688
4	Paladin Motorsports	120
5	Position One Motorsports	52

== Other Formulas powered by Renault championships ==
This section resume unofficial and/or renault engine supplier formulas series.

=== 2007 GP2 Series seasons ===
The GP2 Series are powered by 4 liters, V8 Renault engine and Bridgestone tyres with a Dallara chassis.

=== 2007 Austria Formel Renault Cup season ===
This is the first season of this series using Formula Renault 2.0L. The season is held on 10 races.

- Point system: 20, 15, 12, 10, 8, 6, 4, 2 for 8th. No points for fastest lap or pole position.

Pos	Driver	Team	(Czech Republic) Most ?		(Germany) Lausitz ?		(Germany) Hockenheim ?		(Austria) Salzburg ?		(Germany) Nürburg ?		Points
Pos	Driver	Team	1	2	3	4	5	6	7	8	9	10	Points
1	(France) Gregory Stribieg	Gregory Stribieg	2	4	3	3	1	2	Ret	3	1	1	136
2	(France) Remy Stribieg	Remy Stribieg	3	5	5	4	2	1	4	4	2	2	123
3	(France) Remi Kirchdörffer	Remi Kirchdörffer	4	Ret	4	5	Ret	3	Ret	6	3	3	70
4	(Austria) Christopher Lammel	Kolbenkraus Motorsport	Ret	1	1	1							60
5	(Italy) Alberto Cola	Emmebi Motorsport							1	1			40
6	(Czech Republic) David Palmi	David Palmi	1	2									35
7	(Austria) Wolfgang Klinger	Kolbenkraus Motorsport							2	2			30
–	(Germany) Jan Stepputat	Jan Stepputat			2	2							30
9	(Austria) Wolfgang Dietmann								3	5			20
10	(Hungary) Istvan Tukora	TR Motorsport	Ret	3									12

=== 2007 Fórmula Renault Plus season ===
The last round was cancelled after the death of Gabriel Werner, brother of Mariano Werner (multiple champion in Formula Renault 1.6 Argentina) during the preparation of the Autódromo Oscar Cabalén venue with its team Recta Final Sport.

Pos	Driver	Team	Points
1	(Argentina) Esteban Sarry		
2	(Argentina) Martín Aimar		
3	(Argentina) Facundo Ardusso		
...	...	...	...

=== 2007 Fórmula Renault Interprovencial season ===
Pos	Driver	Team	Points
1	(Argentina) Alejandro Pancello	Augs Competición	
2	(Argentina) Fabricio Fernández	Augs Competición	
	(Argentina) Gastón Mantegari		
	(Argentina) Exequiel Lorenzatti		
	(Argentina) Daniel Gabarra		
	(Argentina) Pablo Teres		
	(Argentina) Darío Fabro		
	(Argentina) Gilles Pagini		
	(Argentina) Juan J. Gabarra		
	(Argentina) Jose Domesi		
	(Argentina) Dino Gardini		
	(Argentina) Juan Micheli		
	(Argentina) Javier Ferreyra		
	(Argentina) Alan Castellano		
	(Argentina) Ramiro Marinucci		
	(Argentina) Franco Mazzelani		
	(Argentina) Adrian Alfango		
	(Argentina) Matías Cantarini		
	(Argentina) Damian Mari		
	(Argentina) Lucas Bagneras		
	(Argentina) Lucas Ledesma		
	(Argentina) Germán Massa		
	(Argentina) Gutavo Cerutti		
	(Argentina) Danilo Dángelo		
...	...	...	...

Pos	Team	Points
1	Augs Competición	
...	...	...

=== 2007 Fórmula 4 Nacional season ===
This is the first season of the Fórmula 4 Nacional series held on Argentina. Cars use Renault Clio K4M engine (1598cc) with lower power than the official 1.6L series. Teams can choose chassis manufacturer (Tulia, Tito...). A Fórmula 4 Metropolitana was planned for the 2008 season.

Colour	Result
Gold	Winner
Silver	2nd place
Bronze	3rd place
Green	Finished, in points
Green	Retired, in points
Blue	Finished, no points
Purple	Did not finish (Ret)
Purple	Not classified (NC)
Red	Did not qualify (DNQ)
Black	Disqualified (DSQ)
White	Did not start (DNS)
White	Withdrew (WD)
Blank	Did not participate
Blank	Injured (INJ)
Blank	Excluded (EX)
**Bold**	Pole position
*	Fastest lap
spr	Sprint Race
fea	Feature Race
