= 2008 Formula Renault seasons =

2008 Formula Renault

Seasons
- ← 2007 2009 →

Formula Renault is a class of formula racing that was founded in 1971. It is currently the biggest single-seater championship in the United Kingdom.

== Season calendar ==
This table indicates the season calendar. It shows the round number of each series along with their dates. The dark boxes indicates the winter series.

Formula; Renault	March				April				May				June					July				August					September				October				November					December
Formula; Renault	8–9	15–16	22–23	29–30	5–6	12–13	19–20	26–27	3–4	10–11	17–18	24–25	31–1	7–8	14–15	21–22	28–29	5–6	12–13	19–20	26–27	2–3	9–10	16–17	23–24	30–31	6–7	13–14	20–21	27–28	4–5	11–12	18–19	25–26	1–2	8–9	15–16	22–23	29–30	6–7	13–14
WSbR								1–2	3–4			5		6–7				8–9								10–11	12–13			14–15			16–17
V6 Asia											1–2					3–4				5–6														9–10				11–14
Eurocup									1–2					3–4				5–6								7–8	9–10			11–12			13–14
WEC			1–2							3–4						5–6											7			8–9	10–11	12–13	14–15
UK				1–2		3–4			5–6		7–8		9–10	11–12					13–14		15–16					17–18			19–20						1–2	3–4
BARC			1–2				3–4					5								6–7			8				9				10–11				1–2	3–4
Italia						1–2				3–4		5–6	7–8															9–10				11–12			1–2
NEC								1–2					3–4		5–6			7–8				9–10	11–12			13–14					15–16
Suisse								1–2		3–4						5–6	7–8						9–10							11–12
Portugal															1–2					3–4										5–6				7–8		9–10		11–12	13–14
Finland											1–2				3–4		5–6				7–8		9–10				11–12
Asia		1–2					3–4					5–6				7–8													9–10		11–12										13–14
'Academy								1–2					3–4			5–6						7–8						9–10			11–12		13–14
Argentina	1					2			3		4			5			6			7			8			9			10			11			12			13		14

== Formula Renault 3.5L ==
See also 2008 World Series by Renault season and 2008 Formula V6 Asia season

=== Collective test for notable 2.0L drivers ===
Every year, Renault Sport Technologies would invite the best Formula Renault 2.0L and Eurocup Mégane Trophy drivers to test the Formula Renault 3.5L. For the 2008 season, the test occurred on November 5–7 on the Paul Ricard HTTT track in France.

The invited drivers
Driver	Team	Note
(United Kingdom) Adam Christodoulou	Fortec Motorsport	
(Portugal) António Félix da Costa	P1 Motorsport	
(Germany) Tobias Hegewald		Withdrew participation due to injury
(Finland) Jesse Krohn	Pons Racing	
(United States) Geoffrey Kwong	KTR	
(Spain) Roberto Merhi	Epsilon Euskadi	
(Brazil) César Ramos	Ultimate Signature	
(Australia) Daniel Ricciardo	Carlin Motorsport	
(France) Michaël Rossi	RC Motorsport	Eurocup Mégane Trophy winner
(Norway) Pål Varhaug	Prema Powerteam	
(France) Tristan Vautier	International DracoRacing	
(Switzerland) Christopher Zanella	Red Devil Team Comtec	

== Formula Renault 2.0L ==
=== Formula Renault 2.0 Eurocup series ===
See also 2008 Eurocup Formula Renault 2.0 season

=== Formula Renault 2.0 West European Cup season ===
The Formula Renault 2.0 West European Cup was the first season for the WEC series. It includes the French Formula Renault championship that offers a reward for the best French driver and rookie driver. It also has the Challenger Cup which is for drivers using cars that run with the 2004 aerodynamic kit.

Race point system
Position	1st	2nd	3rd	4th	5th	6th	7th	8th	9th	10th
Points	15	12	10	8	6	5	4	3	2	1

1 point is given to every pole position holder. 1 point is also given to the fastest driver in each lap. There are 2 race rounds. The first is between 60 kilometres (37 mi) and 80 kilometres (50 mi). The second race is between 20 and 30 minutes.

In Round 6 of the Valencia race, Daniel Ricciardo, Andrea Caldarelli and Jean-Éric Vergne were disqualified for technical regulation non-conformity in their SG Formula's rear wings. Benjamin Lariche, who came in 3rd, was declared the race winner instead.

Pos	Driver	Team	(France) NOG Mar 23–24		(France) DIJ May 10–11		(Spain) VAL Jun 21–22		(France) LEM Sep 6–7	(Portugal) EST Sep 27–28		(Belgium) SPA Oct 4–5		(France) MAG Oct 11–12		(Spain) CAT Oct 18–19		Points	Points (F) (Note: FFSA French Championship)	Points (R) (Note: WEC rookies)	Points (C) (Note: FFSA Challenger Cup)
Pos	Driver	Team	1	2	3	4	5	6	7	8	9	10	11	12	13	14	15	Points	Points (F)	Points (R)	Points (C)
1	(Australia) Daniel Ricciardo	SG Formula	1*	5	1	1*	1	DSQ	1	1	2	2	1	6	4	1	2	192			
2	(Spain) Roberto Merhi	Epsilon Euskadi	3	2	2	2	2	4	3	3	1	1	2	1	3	3	3	184			
3	(Italy) Andrea Caldarelli	SG Formula	2	1*	4	4	3	DSQ	8	Ret	9	3	3	4	1	2	1	129			
4	(France) Jean-Éric Vergne	SG Formula	Ret	9	5	5	4	DSQ	2	2	5	4	4	3	7	4	7	95	119	177	
5	(Spain) Albert Costa	Epsilon Euskadi	8	6	3	10	6	2	Ret	17	4	11	8	2	2	Ret	5	85		154	
6	(France) Tristan Vautier	Epsilon Sport Team(1–4); SG Formula(5–15)	4	3	14	7	11	12	6	4	3	10	5	5	5	5	6	79	107		
7	(Russia) Anton Nebylitskiy	SG Formula	10	8	6	3	5	7	12	8	21	24	18	DNS	9	9	9	41			
8	(Spain) Miquel Monrás	Hitech Junior Team(1–9); SG Formula(10–15)	15	11	11	Ret	19	3	Ret	6	19	5	9	19	11	7	17	30		80	
9	(United States) Jake Rosenzweig	Epsilon Euskadi	9	Ret	8	9	12	14	24	5	6	13	10	8	12	8	13	30		104	
10	(France) Benjamin Lariche	Pole Services	14	19	22	Ret	Ret	1	13	14	8	15	19	Ret	Ret	24	20	18	31		
11	(Dominican Republic) Richard Campollo	Epsilon Euskadi	Ret	4	10	12	7	Ret	21	15	Ret	21	15	DNS	Ret	10	12	16		61	
12	(France) Bastien Borget	Epsilon Sport Team	6	28	DNS	21	Ret	10	22	16	Ret	32	21	10	6	12	11	14	39		
13	(France) Julien Abelli	TCS Racing	DNS	7	13	13	9	11	5	Ret	11	Ret	16	13	10	13	18	14	59	73	
14	(Brazil) Gabriel Dias	Fortec Motorsport	22	29	15	8	8	6	26	9	14	18	DNS					13		41	
15	(France) Mathieu Arzeno	Epsilon Euskadi					Ret	Ret	4					7	Ret			12	23		
16	(Monaco) Stéphane Richelmi	Epsilon Sport Team	5	10	16	11	17	8	17									10			
17	(France) Antony Tardieu	Pole Services	17	12	12	6	13	16	25	Ret	12	23	11	20	15	Ret	10	10	63	52	
18	(France) Nathanaël Berthon	Boutsen Energy Racing	23	13	21	14	Ret	13	9	10	10	7	Ret	23	Ret	14	15	9	44	52	
19	(Australia) Ashley Walsh	Hitech Junior Team	12	17	19	15	21	23	7	18	7	17	22	15	16	Ret	25	8		37	
20	(Spain) Himar Acosta	IQuick					16	5										6			
21	(France) Maxime Jousse	Pole Services	11	Ret	7	17	22	17	16	Ret	DNS	Ret	14	14	13	19	21	5	45	43	
22	(United Arab Emirates) Ramez Azzam	SG Formula	19	Ret	9	Ret	15	24		11	16	20	23	18	8	15	19	5		36	
23	(United Kingdom) Daniel McKenzie	Fortec Motorsport	16	15	20	20	24	18	20	7	17	16	20	17	17	16	16	4		35	
24	(United Kingdom) Richard Singleton	Hitech Junior Team					10	9				14	17	12	Ret			4			
25	(Spain) Miguel Otegui	IQuick-Valencia	7	Ret	Ret	18	18	Ret	23	13	15	25	Ret	16	19	25	22	4		27	
26	(United Kingdom) Luciano Bacheta	Hitech Junior Team	13	14								31	Ret	9	14			2		19	
27	(Spain) Pablo Montilla	Epsilon Euskadi	20	21	18	19	20	15	Ret	12	13	19	Ret	11	Ret	11	14	1			
28	(France) Nicolas Marroc	TCS Racing	18	Ret	17	16	14	Ret	10									1	20		
nc	(France) David Zollinger	Team Palmyr	24	16	24	25			11							18	23	0	13		98
nc	(France) Max Lefèvre	Team Palmyr	26	27	26	22	25	22	15			27	Ret	25	22	20	29	0	15	8	150
nc	(France) Jean-Michel Ogier	Team Palmyr	27	23	27	24	28	21	14			29	DNS	24	21	23	28	0	13		131
nc	(France) Didier Colombat	Team Palmyr	28	22	25	23	27	20	19			30	Ret	26	20	22	30	0	11		134
nc	(France) Sylvain Milesi	Racing Team Trajectoire	30	Ret	23	Ret	23	19										0	2		
nc	(France) Jean-Marc Menahem	Team Palmyr	31	24			Ret	Ret	18			28	Ret			21	27	0	5		66
nc	(Belgium) Benjamin Bailly	Boutsen Energy Racing	25	20														0			
nc	(Portugal) Gonçalo Araújo	Araújo Competição	21	18														0			
nc	(Portugal) Luís Santos	Araújo Competição	25	Ret														0			
nc	(Spain) Marcello Conchado	IQuick	29	25			Ret	Ret						DNS	DNS			0			
nc	(Portugal) Hugo Filipe Mesquita	Araújo Competição	32	26														0			
nc	(France) Gérard Tonelli	Team Palmyr					26	35										0	0		20
nc	(Spain) Pol Rosell	Rodrive Competições					Ret	DNS		Ret	18					DSQ	26	0			
nc	(New Zealand) Dominic Storey	Boutsen Energy Racing								Ret	20							–			
nc	(United Kingdom) Henry Surtees	Manor Motorsport										6	12					–			
nc	(United Kingdom) Dean Smith	Fortec Motorsport										8	6			6	8	–			
nc	(United Kingdom) Alexander Sims	Manor Motorsport										9	Ret					–			
nc	(Sweden) Frederic Blomsted	Fortec Motorsport										12	13					–			
nc	(Netherlands) Daniël de Jong	MP Motorsport										22	7					–			
nc	(Netherlands) Thomas Hylkema	Fortec Motorsport										25	Ret					–			
nc	(Brazil) Pedro Bianchini	Epsilon Euskadi										Ret	Ret					–			
nc	(Colombia) Juan Jacobo	Hitech Junior Team												22	18			–			
nc	(Brazil) André Negrão	Epsilon Sport												DNS	Ret	17	24	–			
nc	(Switzerland) Nico Müller	Jenzer Motorsport														Ret	4	–			

Pos	Team	Points
1	SG Formula	320
2	Epsilon Euskadi	268
3	Epsilon Sport	46
4	Pole Services	28
5	Hitech Junior Team	24
6	TCS Racing	18
7	Fortec Motorsport	17
8	IQuick-Valencia	10
9	Boutsen Energy Racing	9
nc	Team Palmyr	0
nc	Racing Team Trajectoire	0
nc	Araújo Competição	0
nc	Rodrive Competições	0
nc	Manor Motorsport	–
nc	MP Motorsport	–

=== Formula Renault 2.0 UK season ===
See also 2008 Formula Renault UK season

==== Formula Renault 2.0 UK Winter Cup ====
The Formula Renault UK Winter Cup and Formula Renault BARC Winter Cup are held in same time, but with separated classification.

Race point system
Position	1st	2nd	3rd	4th	5th	6th	7th	8th	9th	10th	11th	12th	13th	14th	15th	16th	17th	18th	19th	20th
Points	32	28	25	22	20	18	16	14	12	11	10	9	8	7	6	5	4	3	2	1

There are 2 races in each round, both of them between 30 miles (48 km) and 30 minutes

Pos	Driver	Team	(United Kingdom) Croft November 1		(United Kingdom) Rockingham November 8		Points UK	Points BARC
Pos	Driver	Team	1	2	3	4	Points UK	Points BARC
1	(United Kingdom) James Calado	Fortec Motorsport	2*	1*	1*	7*	116	
2	(United Kingdom) Henry Surtees	Manor Competition	1	2	4	2	113	
3	(United Kingdom) Dean Stoneman	Alpine Motorsports	3	8	Ret	1	73	
4	(United Kingdom) Oliver Webb	Fortec Motorsport	8	5	3	Ret	64	
5	(United Kingdom) William Buller	Fortec Competition	10	11	9	4	58	
6	(United Kingdom) Lewis Williamson	Highland Arena Ltd	Ret	3	15	3	57	
7	(United Kingdom) Harry Tincknell	CR Scuderia Formula Renault	5	12	7	13	56	
8	(United Kingdom) Will Stevens	Fortec Competition	12	13	8	5	54	
9	(Finland) Matias Laine	CR Scuderia Formula Renault	6	18	14	6	50	
10	(United Kingdom) Ollie Hancock	Apotex Scorpio Motorsport	DNS	10	6	11	41	
11	(United Kingdom) Wayne Boyd	Fortec Motorsport	4	7			40	
12	(Bahrain) Menasheh Idafar	Hillspeed	9	Ret	5	16	39	
13	(Japan) Kazuki Hiramine	Eurotek Motorsport	Ret	9	12	8	37	
14	(United Kingdom) Nick Yelloly	Fortec Competition	13	14	13	15	31	
15	(United Kingdom) Michael Lyons	Hillspeed	16	15	10	Ret	25	
16	(United Kingdom) Josh Mulholland	Fortec Competition	17	Ret	11	14	23	
17	(Netherlands) Thomas Hylkema	Mark Burdett Mototrsport	11	Ret	Ret	10	21	
18	(United Kingdom) Tom Armour	Manor Competition	Ret	6	Ret	Ret	20	
19	(Sweden) Fredrik Blomstedt	CR Scuderia Formula Renault	7	Ret	Ret	19	16	
20	(South Korea) Sung-Hak Mun	Manor Competition	14	Ret	Ret	12	16	
21	(United Kingdom) James Dixon	Apotex Scorpio Motorsport	Ret	Ret	Ret	9	12	
22	(Russia) Max Snegirev	Falcon Motorsport			17	18	10	
Un-licensed driver – allowed to race without receiving points
	(Portugal) António Félix da Costa	CR Scuderia Formula Renault	Ret	4	2	20		
BARC Winter Cup
1	(United Kingdom) James Theodore	Hillspeed	15	17	16	17		60
2	(Brazil) Henrique Baptista	Apotex Scorpio Motorsport	18	Ret	18	Ret		24
3	(Iran) Kourosh Khani	Welch Motorsport	Ret	16	Ret	Ret		17
	(United Kingdom) Ian Pearson	Pearson Engineering Services			Ret	DNS		0
	(United Kingdom) Bob Pearson	Pearson Engineering Services			DNS	Ret		0

=== Formula Renault BARC FR2000 series ===
The Formula Renault BARC FR2000 series has 12 rounds in 7 venues. The final standing is established with the best 10 results of the season. A Club Class classification is also established for young drivers (see 2008 Formula Renault BARC Club Class season below) who participate in the same race as the FR2000 series.

Race point system
Position	1st	2nd	3rd	4th	5th	6th	7th	8th	9th	10th
Points	15	12	10	8	6	5	4	3	2	1

1 point is given to every pole position holder. 1 point is also given to the fastest driver in each lap. Races are between 30 miles (48 km) and 30 minutes each.

Pos	Driver	Team	(England) Brands Hatch Indy March 23–24		(England) Rockingham April 19–20		(England) Oulton Park Island May 24	(England) Croft July 19–20		(England) Snetterton August 9–10		(England) Thruxton September 7	(England) Silversone National October 4–5		Points (Note: Points are only awarded to the top 10 drivers in each race.)
Pos	Driver	Team	1	2	3	4	5	6	7	8	9	10	11	12	Points
1	(United Kingdom) Ollie Hancock	Apotex Scorpio Motorsport	13	1*	1*	1*	1*	3	2*	2	1*	2			130
2	(Germany) Johannes Seidlitz	Mark Burdett Motorsport	1	12	2	6	5	Ret	1	5	2	1	Ret	1	101
3	(Bahrain) Isa Yousif Mohammed	Alpine Motorsport	18	2	9	4	3	5	3	1*	7	5*	1*	Ret	92
4	(Bahrain) Menasheh Idafar	Hillspeed	3	3	3	3	7	DSQ	Ret	4	6	7	9	3	77
5	(Oman) Ahmad Al Harthy	Hillspeed	6	4	8	5		2	Ret	6	5	3	3	10	68
6	(United Kingdom) Brett Parris	HS Motorsport Antel	15	10	5	2	9	4	6	Ret	4	Ret	7	2	59
7	(United Kingdom) James Dixon	Mark Burdett Motorsport	9	16	4	8	6	14	4	8	8	9	5	4	48
8	(United Kingdom) Ashley Davies	Taro Motorsport	2*	6	7	Ret	Ret	7	7	9	11	10	4	5	47
9	(United Kingdom) Kenneth Andrews	Alpine Motorsport	Ret	11	10	9	4	Ret	5	7	3	4	8	12	42
10	(United Kingdom) Lee Dwyer	SSS Motorsport	4	DNS	Ret	11	2	6	Ret	11	12	6	6	7	39
11	(United Kingdom) Nathan Coulter	Welch Motorsport(1–2), Triple D(3–4,8–12), Driver(6–7)	DNS	7	13	Ret	Ret	1*	9	Ret	13	Ret	11	8	27
12	(United Kingdom) Ross Curnow	Double M Racing								3	DSQ		2	13*	23
13	(United Kingdom) Aaron Steele	Russell Racing	5	5	6	10									18
14	(United Kingdom) Niki Faulkner	Tempus Sport						8	8	13	9		Ret	9	10
15	(United Kingdom) Michael Lyons	Hillspeed	10	14	12	7	8	12	Ret	12	Ret	11			8
16	(Iran) Kourosh Khani	Welch Motorsport	7	8	11	13		11	13	17	Ret	Ret	16	Ret	7
17	(United Kingdom) Ian Pearson	Pearson Engineering Services			Ret	14		9	12	14	Ret	8	14	Ret	5
18	(United Kingdom) Don De Graaf	Russell Racing(1–2), Tempus Sport(3–12)	12	20	Ret	17	10	10	10	10	10	13	12	11	5
19	(Belgium) Jordi Weckx	Alpine Motorsport	8	13	14	12		Ret	11	16	Ret	17			3
20	(United Kingdom) Joshua Brooks	Boulevard Team Racing	DNS	9	15	18	11	16	14	15	15	Ret	13	18	2
21	(Japan) Kazuki Hiramine												10	6	1?
nc	(Republic of Ireland) Ellis Harkins	Double M Racing	16	Ret	18	DNS	13	15	15	20	17	Ret	19	16	0
nc	(France) Denis Autier	Mark Burdett Motorsport	Ret	19											0
nc	(United Kingdom) Andy Flynn	Falcon Motorsport	DNS	15	16	15									0
nc	(Bahrain) Mohammed Jalal Al A'ali	Tempus Motorsport	11	17	Ret	Ret									0
nc	(United Kingdom) James Tanser	Tempus Motorsport	17	DNS											0
nc	(United Kingdom) Roberto Tirone	Reon Motorsport	DNS	18	17	Ret	15	13	17	21	14	14			0
nc	(France) Pierre Renom	Mark Burdett Motorsport	14	DNS						18	Ret	15	17	Ret	0
nc	(United Kingdom) Bob Pearson	Pearson Engineering Services			Ret	16	12	Ret	16				18	17	0
nc	(United Kingdom) David Rees	Reon Motorsport					14			Ret	16	16			0
nc	(Greece) Konstantinos Kotis	Pearson Engineering Sesvices								19	Ret	12			0
nc	(United Kingdom) James Theodore												15	14	0
nc	(United Kingdom) Andrew Jarman												20	19	0
nc	(United Kingdom) Craig Harris												21	20	0
nc	(United Kingdom) Phil Jenkins												Ret	15	0

==== Formula Renault BARC Club Class series ====
The Formula Renault BARC Club Class series includes 12 rounds in 7 venues. The final standings are established with the best 11 results of the season. The Club Class category is raced at same time as the main Formula Renault BARC FR2000 series. The cars use Tatuus or Mygale chassis and are powered by Renault Laguna 2.0L 6 valves engine providing lower Horsepower than the FR2000 class.

Race point system
Position	1st	2nd	3rd	4th	5th	6th	7th	8th	9th	10th
Points	15	12	10	8	6	5	4	3	2	1

1 point is given to every pole position holder. 1 point is also given to the fastest driver in each lap. Races are between 30 miles (48 km) and 30 minutes each.

Pos	Driver	Team	Chassis	Points
1	(United Kingdom) Fraser Smart	Driver	Tatuus RC98	147
2	(United Kingdom) Steven Durrant	Driver, Muzz Race	Tatuus RC97	124
3	(United Kingdom) Edward Heinzelmann	Heuthsport of Royston	Tatuus RC98, RC97	121
4	(United Kingdom) Adrian Dixon	Driver, Muzz Race	Tatuus RC98, RC99	96
5	(United Kingdom) Jalmes Simons	Driver	Mygale SJ99	54
6	(United Kingdom) Steve Hanselman	Driver	Tatuus RC97(1–5,8–12), RC99(6–7)	50
?	(United Kingdom) Dave Rees	Reon Motorsport	Tatuus RC98	
?	(United Kingdom) Neil Cooper	Reon Motorsport	Tatuus RC99	

==== Formula Renault BARC Winter Cup ====
See also 2008 Formula Renault 2.0 UK Winter Cup and 2008 Formula Renault BARC Winter Cup.

=== Formula Renault 2.0 Italia season ===
See also 2008 Formula Renault 2.0 Italia season

Race point system
Position	1st	2nd	3rd	4th	5th	6th	7th	8th	9th	10th	11th	12th	13th	14th	15th
Points	32	28	24	22	20	18	16	14	12	10	8	6	4	2	1

There are 2 races with rounds length of 30 minutes each. 2 points are awarded to the fastest driver in each lap and another 2 points to the pole position holder.

There are 3 collective tests in summer. In the Misano World Circuit on June 17, in Autodromo Nazionale Monza on July 10 and in the Mugello Circuit on July 23.

Pos	Driver	Team	(Italy) VAL April 12–13		(Hungary) HUN May 10–11		(Czech Republic) BRN May 24–25		(Belgium) SPA May 31 June 1		(Italy) MIS July 19–20 (Note: Misano contested in the test races and hence, was not awarded classification points.)		(Italy) MUG September 13–14		(Italy) MNZ October 11–12		Points
Pos	Driver	Team	1	2	3	4	5	6	7	8	9	10	11	12	13	14	Points
1	(Norway) Pål Varhaug	Jenzer Motorsport	5	4	1	1	1*	5	2	5	12	2	7	5	5	3	330
2	(Italy) Michele Faccin	Jenzer Motorsport	4	1*	9	8	15	6	1*	1*	Ret	8	3*	11	4	5	271
3	(Italy) Niky Sebastiani	IT Loox Racing Car	1*	Ret	3*	3	2	2	3	3	20	3	6	9	10	8	270
4	(United Kingdom) Adrian Quaife-Hobbs	BVM Minardi Team	16	2	5	4*	3	3	5	4	11	6	2	4	11	Ret	250
5	(Italy) Sergio Campana	CO2 Motorsport	6	19	22	9	12	4	Ret	2	1	1	5	Ret	2*	1*	238
6	(Brazil) César Ramos	BVM Minardi Team	3	Ret	2	2	7	7	4	13	23*	4*	4	Ret	3	19	216
7	(Germany) Patrick Kronenberger	Facondini Racing	7	5	6	22	DSQ	1*	8	10	Ret	5	15	1*	9	9	196
8	(Spain) Genís Olivé	Cram Competition	11	8	4	5	16	23	10	11	4	26	12	12	1	2	178
9	(Italy) Daniel Zampieri	BVM Minardi Team	2	13	8	6	17	20	Ret	6	8	10	11	3	6	DNS	158
10	(Netherlands) Stef Dusseldorp	van Amersfoort Racing	14	15	7	7	6	9			16	18	14	6	Ret	4	125
11	(Italy) Patrick Reiterer	Prema Powerteam	23	14	11	13	4	15	7	8	2	9	Ret	14	Ret	Ret	109
12	(Italy) Riccardo Cinti	Tomcat Racing	8	3	21	11	Ret	12	9	9			10	17	12	10	104
13	(Spain) Siso Cunill	Jenzer Motorsport	10	7	Ret	Ret	13	11	6	7	6	12					96
14	(Italy) Alessandro Kouzkin	Cram Competition	17	20	10	Ret	8	8	22	20	3	11	18	Ret	Ret	12	76
15	(Italy) Daniel Mancinelli	It Look Racing(9–10), Team Dueppì(11–14)									5	14	1	2	8	Ret	66
16	(Colombia) Carlos Muñoz	Prema Powerteam	13	18	Ret	Ret	14	10			17	7	22	19	7	6	66
17	(Italy) Stefano Comini	Team Dueppì(1–10), CO2 Motorsport(11-)	12	Ret	17	17	Ret	21	20	21	16	15	9	10	Ret	7	47
18	(Netherlands) Nigel Melker	van Amersfoort Racing	21	Ret	16	15	5	16			22	19	Ret	7			37
19	(Italy) Marco Betti	IT Loox Racing Car	Ret	10	Ret	20	Ret	22	14	14	24	17	8	13	20	Ret	34
20	(San Marino) Paolo Meloni	W&D Racing	Ret	Ret	13	16	10	19	19	23	9	Ret	18	18	13	13	34
21	(Lithuania) Kazim Vasiliauskas	Prema Powerteam	18	9	5	Ret							21	8	14	15	30
22	(Italy) Federico Rossi	CO2 Motorsport	Ret	6	Ret	10											28
23	(Italy) Andrea Borio	Team Dueppì	Ret	11	Ret	21	11	25	23	Ret	14	22	13	16			24
24	(Italy) Stefano Bizzarri	RP Motorsport	9	Ret	20	14	18	13	15	18	21	16					19
25	(Italy) David Fumanelli	RP Motorsport	22	12	12	Ret	Ret	14	18	26	19	Ret	19	20			14
26	(Italy) Andrea Roda	Tomcat Racing	19	16	19	18	9	17	25	25	15	21	Ret	Ret	18	17	13
27	(Canada) Tyler Dueck	Cram Competition	20	17	15	12	Ret	18	24	19	18	25	16	15	15	18	11
28	(Italy) Samuele Buttarelli	Cram Competition	24	Ret	18	Ret	20	Ret	16	24	10	20					10
29	(Switzerland) Fabien Thuner	Jenzer Motorsport							13	12							10
30	(San Marino) Nicola Zonzini	RP Motorsport	15	Ret	Ret	19	19	24	11	17	25	24					9
31	(Italy) Alberto Cola	Team BVE													DNS	11	8
32	(Switzerland) Nico Müller	Jenzer Motorsport							17	16	13	13					8
33	(Switzerland) Simon Trummer	Jenzer Motorsport							12	15	26	23	Ret	Ret			7
34	(Finland) Jesse Krohn	RP Motorsport											17	Ret	16	14	0
35	(Italy) Alberto Bassi	CO2 Motorsport													19	Ret	0
36	(Argentina) Augusto Scalbi	RP Motorsport													17	16	0
37	(Sweden) Felix Rosenqvist	Prema Powerteam							21	22							0

Pos	Team	Points
1	Jenzer Motorsport	515
2	BVM Minardi Team	384
3	It Loox Racing Car	280
4	CO2 Motorsport	227
5	Cram Competition	188
6	Facondini Racing	172
7	Prema Powerteam	155
8	van Amersfoort Racing	140
9	Tomcat Racing	101
10	Team Dueppì	82
11	RP Motorsport	28
12	W&D Racing	26
13	Jenzer Motorsport 2	25
14	AP Motorsport	0
15	Line Race Technology	0
16	Emmebi Motorsport	0
17	Antonino Racing	0
18	Team BVE	0

==== Formula Renault 2.0 Italia Winter Series ====
See also 2008 Formula Renault 2.0 Italia Winter Series

Race point system
Position	1st	2nd	3rd	4th	5th	6th	7th	8th	9th	10th	11th	12th	13th	14th	15th
Points	32	28	24	22	20	18	16	14	12	10	8	6	4	2	1

2 points are awarded to the fastest driver in each lap and 4 points to the pole position holder.

Pos	Driver	Team	(Italy) Imola November 2		Points
Pos	Driver	Team	1	2	Points
1	(Italy) Daniel Mancinelli	It Loox Racing Car	1	5*	58
2	(Lithuania) Kazim Vasiliauskas	CO2 Motorsport	5*	1	54
3	(Switzerland) Nico Müller	Jenzer Motorsport	3	2	52
4	(Spain) Genis Olive	Cram Competition	4	3	46
5	(Italy) Daniel Zampieri	BVM Minardi Team	2	7	44
6	(Italy) Federico Scionti	Tomcat Racing	6	8	32
7	(Germany) Thiemo Storz	CO2 Motorsport	7	11	24
8	(Colombia) Carlos Muñoz	Jenzer Motorsport	Ret	4	22
9	(Czech Republic) Tomas Pivoda	Jenzer Motorsport	9	10	22
10	(Brazil) Adriano Buzaid	BVM Minardi Team	Ret	6	18
11	(Italy) Andrea Amici	Viola Formula Racing	8	Ret	14
12	(Netherlands) Frank Suntjens	Co2 Motorsport	Ret	9	12

=== LO Formule Renault 2.0 Suisse season ===
See also LO Formule Renault 2.0

Race point system
Position	1st	2nd	3rd	4th	5th	6th	7th	8th	9th	10th	11th	12th	13th	14th	15th
Points	25	22	20	18	16	14	12	10	8	6	5	4	3	2	1

Extra 1 point is given to the fastest driver in each lap 2 points to the pole position holder. There are 2 races by rounds.

Pos	Driver	Team	(Germany) HOC April 26–27		(Czech Republic) MOS May 10–11		(Belgium) SPA June 20–21		(Germany) HOC June 28–29		(France) MAG August 9–10		(Italy) MNZ September 27–28		Points
Pos	Driver	Team	1	2	3	4	5	6	7	8	9	10	11	12	Points
1	(Switzerland) Christopher Zanella	Jenzer Motorsport	DSQ	1*	2	1	2	4	5	1	2*	1*	3*	3	249
2	(Switzerland) Simon Trummer	Jenzer Motorsport	1	2	1	3	3	3	11*	5	4	3	2	2	244
3	(Mexico) Yair Godinez	CO2 Motorsport	2*	3	3	2	19*	2*	1	17*	3	2	9	Ret	193
4	(Spain) Genis Olive Juvé	CO2 Motorsport(1–2), Cram Competition(5–12)	3	5			1	6	4	2	5	6	6	4	179
5	(Switzerland) Nico Müller	Jenzer Motorsport	11	8	6	5	5	1	3	3	6	4	5	Ret	174
6	(Italy) Alessandro Kouzkin	Cram Competition	7	4			11	14	6	7	1	5	12	1*	136
7	(Switzerland) Fabien Thuner	Jenzer Motorsport	10	13	5	Ret	4	5	2	4	24	7	4	Ret	130
8	(Italy) Alberto Bassi	CO2 Motorsport	4	6	4	Ret	8	Ret	7	8			Ret	10	90
9	(France) Antonino Pellegrino	Scuderia Antonino Racing (1–8), TJ Emme (9–12)	5	10	Ret	4	16	8	10	9	9	9	11	Ret	85
10	(Italy) Alberto Cola	AP Motorsport	8	7	7	22	15	9	8	10	Ret	Ret	20	5	75
11	(Switzerland) Thomas Amweg	Equipe Bernoise	9	11	12	7	21	19	13	11	11	12	13	9	58
12	(Italy) Federico Gibbin	Line Race Technology(1–4), Dynamic Engineering(5–12)	6	17	10	6	17	12	12	14	17	Ret	10	Ret	51
13	(Italy) Stefano Comini	CO2 Motorsport									8	Ret	1	6	49
14	(Hungary) Tamás Pál Kiss	Speed Box ASE (5–8), BMS Böhlen Motorsport (9–12)					22	17	9	13	12	11	7	7	45
15	(Netherlands) Frank Suntjens	Stroek Motorsport(1–10), CO2 Motorsport(11–12)	Ret	14	13	11	8	10	19	12	14	10	17	Ret	39
16	(Italy) Giacomo Barri	Line Race Technology (1–8), Cram Competition (9–12)	14	21	9	16	9	11	20	16	15	15	8	Ret	36
17	(Italy) Samuele Buttarelli	Cram Competition	Ret	25			10	7	15	6					33
18	(Italy) Federico Scionti	AP Motorsport									7	8	Ret	DNS	22
19	(France) Christopher Brenier	Bossy Racing	19	9	15	8					Ret	24			19
20	(Switzerland) Kurt Böhlen	BMS Bölhen Motorsport	13	15	Ret	20	13	15	14	21	13	Ret	Ret	11	19
21	(Italy) Gianmarco Voltan	Patavinum			8	9									18
22	(Italy) Mattia Bernardi	Viola Formula Racing	16	12	11	Ret	12	13							16
23	(Switzerland) Patrick Cicchiello	Linerace Technology					6	Ret	Ret	15					15
24	(Italy) Christian Mancinelli	Line Race Technology									19	16	14	8	12
25	(Switzerland) Pascal Gehring	Equipe Bernoise	Ret	Ret	14	10			17	22	18	14	16	Ret	10
26	(Italy) Pietro Gandolfi	Emmebi Motorsport	17	Ret	Ret	12	14	18	DNS	19	21	Ret	Ret	Ret	6
27	(Italy) Francesco Baroni	Dynamic Engineering	Ret	16	Ret	21	18	16	18	20	23	25	15	12	5
28	(Italy) Antonio Loprieno	Emmebi Motorsport	12	23											4
29	(Italy) Edoardo Bacci	Line Race Technology									20	13			3
30	(Portugal) Carlos Do Coito	TJ Emme			16	13	23	Ret							3
31	(Switzerland) Fernando Trevisan	Bossy Racing	15	DNS	18	14									3
32	(Belgium) Eddy Roosens	Speed Racing(1–6,9–12), Ecurie le Perron(7–8)	21	24			20	22	21	24	27	23	18	13	3
33	(Hungary) István Tukora	BMS Bölhen Motorsport	Ret	18	Ret	17					26	20	19	14	2
34	(Switzerland) Beat Wittwer	Jenzer Motorsport	20	20	Ret	15	24	20	16	18	29	19			1
35	(Italy) Luigi Stanco	Stanco Motorsport(1–4), Equipe Bernoise(7-)	Ret	22	17	18			Ret	23					0
36	(Italy) Flavio Pierleoni	Emmebi Motorsport									22	17			0
37	(Italy) Flavio Mattara	Giallo Racing Group					25	21			28	22			0
38	(France) Steeve Gerard	Bossy Racing									25	21			0
39	(Germany) Marvin Pletz	BMS Bölhen Motorsport	18	19											0
40	(Poland) Michal Slomain	Advance			Ret	19									0
41	(Portugal) Frederico Duarte	Living Kart Club	Ret	DNS											0
nc	(France) Antonin Borga	Sports Promotion									10	Ret			–
nc	(Switzerland) Christophe Hurni	Sports Promotion									16	18			–

=== Fórmula Júnior FR2.0 Portugal season ===
This is the first season of the Fórmula Júnior FR2.0 held in Portugal. The series, which is the first single-seater championship in Portugal since the end of Formula BMW in 2004, uses Tatuus Formula Renault chassis with Renault 2.0L engines and Michelin tyres.

Race point system
Position	1st	2nd	3rd	4th	5th	6th	7th	8th	9th	10th
Points	15	12	10	8	6	5	4	3	2	1

1 point is given to the fastest driver for each lap and another point to the pole position holder. There are 2 races per round.

The Estoril rounds held on September, 27–28 were part of the World Series by Renault event. The races at the last two venues, in Jerez and Estoril, were held at the same time as the Portugal Winter Series FR2.0.

Pos	Driver	Team	(Portugal) EST June 14–15		(Portugal) EST July 19–20		(Portugal) EST September 27–28 (Note: Optional race. Points are only awarded if all drivers are involved.)		(Portugal) BRA October 25–26		(Portugal) POR November 8–9		(Spain) JER November 22–23 (Note: Raced held at the same time as the Portugal Winter Series FR2.0)		(Portugal) EST November 29–30		Points
Pos	Driver	Team	1	2	3	4	5	6	7	8	9	10	11	12	13	14	Points
1	(Portugal) Gonçalo Araújo	Araújo Competição	1	1	1	4	2	2	6	2*	2	1*	2	2			149
2	(Portugal) Luís Santos	CD Sport(1–4, 7–8), Jenzer Motorsport(5–6), Fortec Motorsport(11–14)	5	3	4	3	5	1	9	5			1*	1	2	1*	121
3	(Spain) Pol Rosell Costa	Rodrive Competições	3	2	2	2	4	3	1*	7	7	7	8	3*	6	6	113
4	(Portugal) Bruno Serra	Araújo Competição	4	4	3*	1*	10	8	3	3	6*	2	5	Ret			91
5	(Spain) Azor Dueñas	Rodrive Competições	7	6	5	5	3	4	4	9	3	3	4	6	5	7	90
7	(Spain) Marcelo Conchado	Amiter Galuppo Sport							10	1	1	8	Ret	8	1*	2	66
6	(Spain) Alan Sicart	Rodrive Competições	6	7	9	10	6	7	2	10	8	4	6	Ret	3	3	65
8	(Portugal) Fábio Mota	Araújo Competição	9	Ret	10	6	8	6	7	8	4	5	3	4	Ret	5	57
9	(Angola) Fiório de Sousa	Automalaca Racing (1–4), Carreto 18 (5–10), Rodrive Competições (11–12), Fortec Motorsport(13–14)	12	Ret	7	8	7	5	5	4	7	Ret	7	5	7	4	56
10	(France) Joffrey Didier	Rodrive Competições	8	9	6	7	9	9	8	6	5	6	9	7	4	8	54
11	(France) Fabien Rosier	CD Sport	2*	5*													20
12	(France) Benjamin Lariche	Pole Services					1*	Ret									17
13	(Portugal) Rodrigo Gallego	Araújo Competição			8	9											5
14	(Portugal) Hugo Pereira (Note: B Class drivers use Formula Renault before 2003 with aerodynamic kit from 2002.)	CD Sport	11	8													4
15	(Spain) Sara García	Rodrive Competições	10	10	Ret	Ret											2
18	(France) Rémy Kirchdoerffer	CD Sport	13	11													2
16	(France) Claude Degremont	Pole Services					Ret	Ret									0
17	(France) Maxime Jousse	Pole Services					DNS	Ret*									0
19	(Portugal) Gilberto Figo	CD Sport			Ret	Ret											0

Pos	Team	Points
1	Araújo Competição	264
2	Rodrive Competições	239
3	Fortec Motorsport	72
4	CD-Sport	69
5	Amiter Galuppo Sport	67
6	Fiorio de Sousa	33
7	Jenzer Motorsport	21
8	Pole Services	19

==== Fórmula Júnior FR2.0 Portugal(Portugal Winter Series FR2.0) ====
The Winter Series is held at the same time as the two final venues of the Fórmula Júnior FR2.0 Portugal season.

Race point system
Position	1st	2nd	3rd	4th	5th	6th	7th	8th	9th
Points	15	12	10	8	6	5	4	3	2

Every driver who finishes to race will get 1 point. 1 point is also given for the fastest driver in each lap and another point for pole position.

Pos	Driver	Team	(Spain) Jerez November 22–23		(Portugal) Estoril November 29–30		Points
Pos	Driver	Team	1	2	3	4	Points
1	(United Kingdom) James Calado	Fortec Motorsport	2	1	1*	1*	60
2	(United Kingdom) Oliver Webb	Fortec Motorsport	1	Ret	4	6	28
3	(Brazil) André Negrão	Epsilon Sport	5	2	16	12	20
4	(United Kingdom) Lewis Williamson	CR Scuderia			2	5	18
5	(United Kingdom) Will Buller	Fortec Motorsport	4	3			18
6	(United Kingdom) Adrian Quaife-Hobbs	Motopark Academy			5	3	16
7	(Italy) Giovanni Venturini	CO2 Motorsport	6	5	14	7	16
8	(United Kingdom) Will Stevens	Fortec Motorsport	3	8*	Ret	10	15
9	(Portugal) Luís Santos	Fortec Motorsport	7	4	17	16	14
10	(Denmark) Kevin Magnussen	Motopark Academy			Ret	2	12
11	(Denmark) Marco Sørensen	Motopark Academy			7	4	12
12	(Finland) Matias Laine	CR Scuderia			3	13	11
13	(United Kingdom) Harry Tincknell	CR Scuderia			6	8	8
14	(Portugal) Gonçalo Araújo	Araújo Competição	9	6			7
15	(Italy) Sergio Campana	CO2 Motorsport	8*	Ret	12	22	7
16	(Spain) Pol Rosell Costa	Rodrive Competições	15	7	21	21	7
17	(Portugal) António Félix da Costa	Motopark Academy			8	25	4
18	(Poland) Jakub Giermaziak	Motopark Academy			9	9	4
19	(Portugal) Fábio Mota	Araújo Competição	10	9	Ret	20	4
20	(Spain) Azor Dueñas	Rodrive Competições	11	11	20	23	4
21	(Angola) Fiório de Sousa	Rodrive Competições(1–2), Fortec Motorsport(3–4)	14	10	22	19	4
22	(France) Joffrey Didier	Rodrive Competições	16	12	19	24	4
23	(Spain) Alan Sicart	Rodrive Competições	13	Ret	18	18	3
24	(Spain) Marcelo Conchado	Amiter Galuppo Sport	Ret	13	11	17	3
25	(Italy) Dino Zamparelli	Fortec Motorsport	Ret	Ret	10	11	2
26	(Angola) Luís Sá Silva	Motopark Academy			15	14	2
27	(Philippines) Marlon Stöckinger	CR Scuderia			13	15	2
28	(Portugal) Bruno Serra	Araújo Competição	12	Ret			1
29	(Portugal) Carlos Coito	Araujo Competição	DNS	DNS			0

=== Formule Renault 2.0 Finland season ===
See also Formule Renault 2.0 Finland

Race point system
Position	1st	2nd	3rd	4th	5th	6th	7th	8th	9th	10th	11th	12th	13th	14th	15th	16th	17th	18th	19th
Points	30	24	20	17	16	15	14	13	12	10	9	8	7	6	5	4	3	2	1

There are 2 or 3 races by rounds, each lasting for approximately 20 minutes.

Pos	Driver	Team	(Finland) Ahvenisto May 17–18			(Finland) Alastaro June 14–15		(Estonia) Audru June 28–29		(Finland) Botniaring August 9–10		(Finland) Ahvenisto September 5–6			Points
Pos	Driver	Team	1	2	3	4	5	6	7	8	9	10	11	12	Points
1	(Finland) Jesse Krohn	P1 Motorsport	1*	1*	1	1	1	1	1	1	2	1	3	2	338
2	(Estonia) Kevin Korjus	T.T. Racing Team	2	2	3	2	9	2	2	2	1	2	1	1	290
3	(Finland) Toomas Heikkinen	RedStep Formula	Ret	3	2	3	2	3	5	3	4	3	2	3	225
4	(Estonia) Karl-Oskar Liiv	T.T. Racing Team	4	4	4	4	4	5	3	4	3	5	4	4	208
5	(Finland) Ville Miilumäki	RedStep Formula	5	8	5	6	3	4	4	7	9	4	5	5	189
6	(Estonia) Erko Vallbaum	MKE Motorsport	6	7	9	7	5	8	6	9	8	8	8	7	164
7	(Finland) Jesse Laine	Kart Motorsport	Ret	6	6	5	7	6	8	5	5	6	6	9	162
8	(Finland) Kalle Kulmanen	RedStep Formula	7	9	8	9	6	7	7	8	7	9	7	6	162
9	(Finland) Henri Tuomaala	Iceboys	3	5	7	8	8	Ret	Ret	6	6	7	Ret	8	133

=== Formula Renault 2000 de America season ===
See also Formula Renault 2000 de America

The series is included in the Panam GP Series.

Race point system
Position	1st	2nd	3rd	4th	5th	6th	7th	8th	9th	10th
Points	30	24	20	16	12	10	8	6	4	2

Extra 1 point is given to the fastest driver of each lap and another point for pole position.

The Formula Renault 2000 and 1600 Junior championship were cancelled in May 2008 by Alfonso Toledano, the president of the Panam GP Series. A part of the engaged teams withdrew their participation, forcing the cancellation of the races at the Latin American venues due to low crowd-turnout.

The original calendar was :

- Rounds 1&2: Mexico, Autódromo Hermanos Rodríguez, March 15–16
- Round 3: Guatemala, Autódromo Los Volcanes, May 11
- Round 4: El Salvador, ?, May 18
- Round 5: Costa Rica, Autódromo La Guácima, June 8
- Rounds 6&7: Ecuador, Autodromo Internacional de Yahuarcocha, August 2–3
- Rounds 8&9: Colombia, Autódromo Tocancipá, September 6–7
- Round 10: Argentina, ?, October 26
- Round 11: Puerto Rico, Ponce International Speedway Park, November 23
- Round 12: Republica Dominicana, ?, November 30

Pos	Driver	Team	Mexico DC March 15–16		Points
Pos	Driver	Team	1	2	Points
1	(Mexico) Javier Razo	Roshfrans	2	2	48
2	(Mexico) Javier Ramos		4	1	46
3	(Mexico) David Farias	Daewoo	3	3*	41
4	(Mexico) Jose Carlos Sandoval		5	4	38
5	(Mexico) Hugo Oliveras	FedEx Citizen	1*	Ret	33
6	(Mexico) Jorge Alarcon		9	5	16
7	(Mexico) Jose Luis Cortinas	JL Racing	8	6	16
8	(Mexico) Enrique Vazquez		6	11	10
9	(Guatemala) Diego Cuestas	Movistar	7	10	10
10	(Mexico) David Garcia		Ret	7	8
11	(Mexico) Aaron Jose Ramos	Unico Racing Team	11	8	6
12	(Mexico) Rafael Vallina	TAB	DNS	9	4
13	(Mexico) Alejandro Cortinas	JL Racing	10	12	2

=== Fórmula Renault 2.0 Brasil season ===
Race point system
Position	1st	2nd	3rd	4th	5th	6th	7th	8th	9th	10th
Points	30	24	20	16	12	10	8	6	4	2

Extra 1 point is given to the fastest driver in each lap and another point for pole position.

The Fórmula Renault 2.0 Brasil championship was cancelled after the first round due to a lack of participation.

Pos	Driver	Team	(Brazil) Curitiba March 2		Points
Pos	Driver	Team	1	2	Points
1	(Brazil) Leonardo Otero	Nacional	1	1	60
2	(Brazil) Ernesto Otero	PropCar	4	2	41
3	(Brazil) William Starostik	Bassani	5	4	29
4	(Brazil) Estephano Esteves	Kemba	2	Ret	24
5	(Brazil) Leonardo de Souza	Kemba	DSQ	3	21
6	(Brazil) Nilton Molina Neto	Bassani	3	Ret	20

=== Asian Formula Renault Challenge season ===
See also Asian Formula Renault Challenge

Race point system
Position	1st	2nd	3rd	4th	5th	6th	7th	8th	9th	10th	11th	12th	13th	14th
Points	30	24	20	17	15	13	11	9	7	5	4	3	2	1

There are 2 races by rounds.

Drivers who start their season at round 5 or later do not receive any points for the final standing. The team points-attribution is different from the driver point system : 10, 8, 6, 5, 4, 3, 2, 1.

The Asian Challenge Category (A) is only for Asian drivers. The China Formula Renault Challenge (C) is for any rounds held in China. The IFC Trophy (IFC) is for the rookie drivers.

Pos	Driver	Team	(China) Zhuhai March 15–16		(China) Shanghai April 19–20		(China) Shanghai May 24–25		(Malaysia) Sepang June 20–22		(China) Zhuhai September 20–21		(China) Zhuhai October 4–5		(China) Zhuhai December 13–14		Points	Points (C)	Points (A)	Points (IFC)
Pos	Driver	Team	1	2	3	4	5	6	7	8	9	10	11	12	13	14	Points	Points (C)	Points (A)	Points (IFC)
1	(Hong Kong) Jim Ka To	Fretech FRD Team	1*	Ret	14	12	3	1*	1	1	1*	1*	3	2	1	1	308	248		
2	(United States) Geoffrey Kwong	PS Racing	2	1	5	3	1	2	4	2*	3	3	7	6	3	3	292	251		
3	(China) Hong Wei Cao	PS Racing	4	2	7	6	4	3	2	3	2	2	2	Ret	DNS	6	231	187	326	
4	(Angola) Luís Jorge Sá Silva	Champ Motorsports	DNS	6	16	8	2*	4	DSQ	7	4	4	5	4	2*	2*	193	182		
5	(Indonesia) Ryan Haryanto	Champ Motorsports	3	9	8	5	5	6	Ret	5	DSQ	6	6	5	5	5	171	156	283	
6	(Indonesia) Rio Haryanto	Asia Racing Team	Ret	4	9	9			3*	4			1*	1	7	4	160	123	220	
7	(China) Zuo Xiao Long	Fretech FRD Team	9	8			6	5	5	6	8	7					92	64	162	
8	(Sweden) Felix Rosenqvist	March 3 Racing			1*	1											60	60		
9	(Netherlands) Francis Tjia	Modena Motorsport			Ret	11	7	7	Ret	Ret	6	5					54	54		138
10	(Canada) Christian Chia	Modena Motorsport			10	10			6	8	7	9					50	28		160
11	(Sweden) Fredrik Blomstedt	March 3 Racing			2	2*											48	48		
12	(Indonesia) Alexandra Asmasoebrata	PS Racing	5	Ret			8	9	Ret	9							38	31	67	
13	(Canada) Wayne Shen	Modena Motorsports	Ret	10			10	10	Ret	Ret	5	10					35	35		119
14	(France) Benjamin Rouget	March 3 Racing			4	4											34	34		
15	(Canada) John Shen	Modena Motorsports	12	12	11	14	12	12	8	Ret	16	12					34	25		160
16	(France) Thomas Santin	Asia Racing Team	7	3													31	31		
17	(Canada) Samson Chan	Ghiasports Racing Team	10	11	15	16					10	8					25	25		122
18	(United States) Kevin Chen	Champ Motorsports	6	7													24	24		
19	(Hong Kong) Michael Choi	Asia Racing Team	8	5													24	24		60
20	(China) Zhang Zhen Dong	March 3 Racing			6	7											24	24	50	
21	(France) Mathias Beche Aussel	Champ Motorsport			3	15											20	20		
22	(Hong Kong) David Lau Ying King	Fretech FRD Team(1–2), Galaxy FRD Racing Team(9–14)	Ret	14							Ret	13			8	10	28	28		80
23	(China) He Xiao Le	Galaxy FRD Racing Team					9	8									16	16	32	
24	(Hong Kong) Kenneth Ma	Galaxy FRD Racing Team							7	10	DNS	DNS					16	0		48
25	(Hong Kong) Ma Chi Min	Galaxy FRD Racing Team					11	11	9	Ret							15	8		57
26	(Canada) Douglas Moore	Asia Racing Team(1–2), Douglas Moore (9–10)	Ret	13							12	Ret					7	7		30
27	(Venezuela) Samín Gómez Briceño	March 3 Racing			12	13											5	5		
28	(Hong Kong) Kenneth Lau	Dyna Ten Motorsports Ltd.	11	Ret													4	4		20
29	(China) Zhu Dai Wei	March 3 Racing			13	Ret											2	2	15	
30	(Israel) Alon Day	Asia Racing Team	Ret	15*													0	0		
The following drivers are not classified due to late participation in the championship
31	(Macau) Dianna Rosario	Galaxy FRD Racing Team									13	11			DNS	Ret	0	0	0	
32	(China) Zhang Shan Qi	PTRS Team									Ret	17			6	7	0	0	0	
33	(Hong Kong) Alan Lee	Galaxy FRD Racing Team(9–10,13–14), PS Racing(11–12)									11	15	8	Ret	9	9	0	0	0	
34	(Macau) Leung Chi Hao	Champ Motorsports									Ret	Ret					0	0	0	
35	(Hong Kong) Stephen Fan	Stephen Fan									14	14					0	0		0
36	(Hong Kong) Shim Ching	PS Racing									17	18					0	0		0
37	(China) Wong Hon Tat	Wong Hon Tat									15	DSQ					0	0		0
38	(Hong Kong) Yung Hau Woon	Champ Motorsport									9	16					0	0		0
39	(Hong Kong) Chin Ka Lok	Galaxy FRD Racing Team											DNS	7	DNS	8	0	0		60
40	(Macau) Felipe De Souza	Galaxy FRD Racing Team											9	Ret			0	0		
41	(Macau) Kam San Lam	Galaxy FRD Racing Team											10	Ret			0	0		0
42	(China) Jiang Teng Yi	Fretech FRD Team													4	Ret	0	0	0	
nc	(Hong Kong) Adderly Fong	Fretech FRD Team											4	3*			–	–		

Pos	Team	Points	Points (C)
1	PS Racing	119	
2	Champ Motorsports	101	
3	Fretech FRD Team	96	
4	Modena Motorsports	48	
5	Asia Racing Team	37	
6	Galaxy FRD Racing Team	27	
7	March3 Racing	20	
8	Ghiasports Racing Team	8	
9	Dyna Ten Motorsports Ltd	4	

== Formula Renault 1.6L ==
=== Formul'Academy Euro Series season ===
See also 2008 Formul'Academy Euro Series season and Formul'Academy Euro Series

=== Formula Renault Elf 1.6 Argentina season ===
All cars use Tito 02 chassis.

Race point system
Position	1st	2nd	3rd	4th	5th	6th	7th	8th	9th	10th
Points	20	15	12	10	8	6	4	3	2	1

1 point is given for pole position and an extra point in each race for every participating driver.

Pos	Driver	Team	Points
1	(Argentina) Guido Falaschi	GF Racing	202
2	(Argentina) Matías Muñoz Marchese	Gabriel Werner Competición	185
3	(Argentina) Facundo Ardusso	Gabriel Werner Competición	130
4	(Argentina) Kevin Icardi	GR Sport	109
5	(Argentina) Martín Serrano	GF Racing	98
6	(Argentina) Francisco Troncoso	GF Racing	88
7	(Argentina) Franco Vivian	FIV Fórmula	75
8	(Argentina) Rodrigo Rogani	Litoral Group	65
9	(Ecuador) Miguel Villagomez	JLS Motorsport	61
10	(Argentina) Esteban Sarry	Gabriel Werner Competición	49
11	(Chile) Kevin Toledo	Werner Junior	48
12	(Argentina) Gustavo Micheloud	Bouvier Racing	48
13	(Argentina) Gastón Rossi	Werner Junior	48
14	(Argentina) Nicolás Trosset	Werner Junior	45
15	(Argentina) Agustín Miotti	JLS Motorsport	44
16	(Argentina) Antonino García	Neuquén Sport Group	23
17	(Argentina) Martín Aimar	Litoral Group Fórmula	23
18	(Argentina) Germán Sirvent	Bouvier Racing	19
19	(Argentina) Franco Bosio	Litoral Group	18
20	(Argentina) Ayrton Molina	Croizet Racing	14
21	(Argentina) Gerardo Salaverria	GF Racing Junior	13
22	(Argentina) Emanual Cáceres	GR Sport	13
23	(Argentina) Federico Moisés	Moisés Competición	12
24	(Argentina) Juan Manuel Benedetti	Neuquén Sport Group	10
25	(Argentina) Fernando Barrere	Damiano MS	10
26	(Argentina) Gianfranco Collino	Neuquén Sport Group	8
27	(Argentina) Octavio Chagas	GR Sport	8
28	(Argentina) Franco Riva	Becerra Racing	8
29	(Argentina) Nicolás Outeiriño	Bouvier Racing	6
30	(Argentina) Juan Cruz Dávila	Croizet Racing	5
31	(Argentina) Santiago Ghisiglieri	Litoral Group Fórmula	5
32	(Argentina) Nicolás Cotignola	Croizet Racing	2
33	(Argentina) Agustín Alcalde	Neuquén Sport Group	2
34	(Argentina) Christian Tarchini	Bouvier Racing	2
35	(Argentina) Franco Girolami	Litoral Group Fórmula	2
36	(Argentina) Nicolás Ursprung	SML	2
37	(Argentina) Ezequiel Tudesco	Neuquén Sport Group	1
38	(Argentina) Mario Reynoso	Croizet Racing	1
39	(Argentina) Francisco Viel Bugliotti	JLS Motorsport	1
40	(Argentina) Mauro Gervaldo	Gabriel Werner Competición	1
41	(Argentina) Roberto Arato	Litoral Group Fórmula	1

== Other Formulas powered by Renault championships ==
Unofficial and/or Renault engine supplier formulas series.

=== GP2 Series seasons ===
See also GP2 Series, 2008 GP2 Series season, 2008 GP2 Asia Series season, and 2008-09 GP2 Asia Series season

The GP2 Series and GP2 Asia Series are powered by 4 liters, V8 Renault engine and Bridgestone tyres with a Dallara chassis.

=== Formula 16 season ===
The official Formula Renault 1.6L Belgium was cancelled after the 2007 season and the Belge Formula 16 attempt to replace it with the same cars. The series was cancelled after 4 races.

Pos	Driver	Team	Points
1	(Belgium) Jordy Dodemont	True Racing	80
2	(Belgium) Valerie Theuwissen	Theuwissen Racing	36
3	(Belgium) Niels Cox	TOF Racing	21
...	...	...	...

=== Austria Formel Renault Cup season ===
This is the second season of this series using Formula Renault 2.0L. The season is held on 12 rounds in 6 venues in Czech Republic, Germany and Austria.

1. Autodrom Most (May 17)
2. EuroSpeedway Lausitz (June 29)
3. Hockenheimring (August 3)
4. Most (August 24)
5. Salzburgring (September 28)
6. Hockenheimring (October 19)

Pos	Driver	Team	Points
1	(France) Gregory Stribieg	Gregory Stribieg	67
2	(France) Remy Striebig	Remy Striebig	63
3	(France) Remi Kirchdörffer	Remi Kirchdörffer	50
4	(Switzerland) Urs Maier		46
5	(Czech Republic) Martin Tlusty	TL Motorsport	30
6	(Austria) Daniel Schnellnegger	Krause Motorsport	28
7	(Estonia) Marek Kiisa	Team Scuderia Nordica	26
8	(Germany) Jan Stepputat	Jan Stepputat	16
9	(Austria) Bernd Herndlhofer	Franz Wöss Racing	15
10	(Estonia) Annus Toomas	Team Scuderia Nordica	12
11	(Estonia) Indrek Rahumaa	Team Scuderia Nordica	9
12	(Austria) Norbert Gruber		8

=== Formula Renault 2.0 North European Zone season ===
Race point system
Position	1st	2nd	3rd	4th	5th	6th	7th	8th	9th	10th	11th	12th
Points	25	20	16	14	12	10	8	6	4	3	2	1

1 point is awarded to the fastest driver in each lap and another point for pole position.

Pos	Driver	Team	(Latvia) Bikernieki May 3–4		(Finland) Alastaro June 14–15		(Estonia) Pärnu or Linnaring June 27–28		(Sweden) Knutstorp August 30–31		Points
Pos	Driver	Team	1	2	3	4	5	6	7	8	Points
1	(Finland) Jesse Krohn	P1 Motorsport									153
2	(Estonia) Erko Vallbaum	MKE Motorsport									62
3	(Estonia) Kevin Korjus	T.T. Racing Team									55
4	(Finland) Toomas Heikkinen	Red Step Formula									52
5	(Estonia) Martin Laur	Scuderia Nordica									48
6	(Estonia) Karl-Oskar Liiv	T.T. Racing Team									48
7	(Finland) Ville Miilumäki	Red Step Formula									46
8	(Netherlands) Daniel de Jong										46
9	(Finland) Juha-Pekka Wikman										32
10	(Finland) Jesse Laine	Kart Motorsport									26
11	(Finland) Kalle Kulmanen	Red Step Formula									22
12	(Finland) Henri Tuomaala	Iceboys									5
13	(Finland) Ron Grönlund	NFR Team									4
14	(Estonia) Johannes Moor	Scuderia Nordica									0

=== Formula 2000 Light season ===
This is the first season of the Formula 2000 Light held in Italy. The series uses the Tatuus Formula Renault or Formula 3 chassis with Renault 2000 cc maximum engines and Michelin tyres.

Race point system
Position	1st	2nd	3rd	4th	5th	6th	7th	8th	9th	10th	11th	12th	13th	14th	15th
Points	32	28	24	22	20	18	16	14	12	10	8	6	4	2	1

2 points are given to the fastest driver in each lap and 3 points for pole position. There are 2 races by rounds.

The championship have several categories :

- Over 35 : for drivers above 35 years (+).
- Under 17 : for drivers under 17 years (−).
- Formula 3 : for drivers using Formula 3 chassis (F3).

Pos	Driver	Team	(Italy) Magione March 28–29		(Italy) Magione April 19–20		(Italy) Adria May 17–18		(Italy) Varano Juin 14–15		(Italy) Imola September 20–21		(Italy) Magione October 18–19		Points
Pos	Driver	Team	1	2	3	4	5	6	7	8	9	10	11	12	Points
1	(Italy) Mario Bertolotti	CO2 Motorsport	1	1	4	3	1*	1	2	13	1	1	19	Ret	278
2	(Italy) Federico Scionti (Note: Driver under 17 years)	AP Motorsport			1*	1*	2	7*	3*	2*	4	2*	1	9	269
3	(Italy) Claudio Maria Castiglioni	TJ Emme	6	Ret	9	9	6	4	7	7	14	16	7	Ret	136
4	(Italy) Andrea Borio	Team Dueppì	2	3	2	Ret					5	4			126
5	(Italy) Paolo Coppi (Note: Drivers above 35 years)	AP Motorsport	8	11			4	3	5	6	10	11			124
6	(Italy) Giacomo Barri	Line Race Technology	Ret	5	7	6			4	4					106
7	(Mexico) Yair Godinez	CO2 Motorsport	5*	4*	Ret	2									92
8	(Italy) Enrico Garbelli	AP Motorsport			6	5							3	3	86
9	(Italy) Mauro Brozzi (Note: Drivers using Dallara Formula 3 chassis with Opel or Fiat engine)(Fiat)	Bellspeed					15	DNS			11	12	2*	1	83
10	(Italy) Tony Di Giulo	CG Motorsport					3	2	6	9					82
11	(Italy) Laura Polidori (3–8) (Note: Woman driver)	LP Motorsport			8	8			11	8	15	17	6	8	82
12	(Italy) Sergio Ghiotti (Opel)	System Team									2*	5	15	2	82
13	(Italy) Davide Pigozzi	Tomcat Racing	Ret	10			10	Ret	8	11			14	12	72
14	(Italy) Thiemo Storz	CO2 Motorsport									8	6	5	5	72
15	(Italy) Cristian Corsini	CO2 Motorsport							1	1					70
16	(Italy) Stefano Comini	Dueppì	3	8	3	DNS									62
17	(Italy) Federico Gibin	Line Race Technology	Ret	2	12	7									54
18	(Italy) Leonardo Geraci	Team Dueppì									Ret	10	4	4	54
19	(Italy) Davide Mangeri	Sarchio Racing					7	Ret	Ret	10			18	10	50
20	(Italy) Alberto Bassi	CO2 Motorsport	4	7					10	Ret					48
21	(Italy) Riccardo Cinti	Tomcat Racing									3	3			48
22	(Italy) Damiano Manni	PSR Motorsport	7	6									8	DSQ	48
23	(Italy) Federico Porri	Keks Motorsport			Ret	11	8	6					17	15	43
24	(Italy) Nicholas Risitano	Scuderia Victoria			5	4									42
25	(Italy) Domenico Dardo	Team Dueppì			10	DNS			9	12	18	19	11	14	38
26	(Netherlands) Frank Suntjens	CO2 Motorsport									6	7			34
27	(Italy) Giancarlo Gionti	CO2 Motorsport					9	5							32
28	(Italy) Michele Merendino	Alan Racing							12	3					30
29	(Italy) Chiara Lorena Vescio ( 3&4)	Line Race Technology	Ret	12	10	12									26
30	(Italy) Luca Pizzico	Dynamic									9	8			26
31	(Italy) Elena Missaglia	Tomcat Racing											10	7	26
32	(Italy) Pierfrancesco Sampieri	CO2 Motorsport	9	9											24
33	(Italy) Dino Lusuardi (Opel)	System Team					16	DNS	DNS	5	13				24
34	(Italy) Luciano Baldazzi	AB Motorsport					5	DNS							20
35	(Italy) Christian Mancinelli	LineRace Technology									7	14			20
36	(Italy) Piergiorgio Capra	Team Dueppi											9	11	20
37	(Italy) Gianluca Baldini	CO2 Motorsport					13	8							18
38	(Italy) Pierluigi Veronesi	CO2 Motorsport											16	6	18
39	(Italy) Francesco Baroni	Dynamic									9				12
40	(Portugal) Carlos Filipe Gonçalves Coito	TJ Emme			Ret	10									11
41	(Italy) Andrea Amici	Team Dueppì									19	21	12	13	10
42	(Italy) Massimo Ballestri (Fiat)	System Team					11	DNS			16	Ret			8
43	(Italy) Giorgio Ferri	KeKS Motorsport									12	15			7
44	(Italy) Antonio Vizzaccaro	Bellspeed					12	DNS							6
45	(Italy) Luigi Folloni	Bellspeed					17	DNS					13	16	4
46	(Italy) Gianpiero Negrotti	System Team					14	DNS							2
47	(Italy) Salvatore Cardullo (Fiat)	Cherubini Racing							Ret	DNS	17				2
48	(Italy) Ivan Tramontozzi (Opel)	Team Dueppì									21	14			2
49	(Italy) Carlo Bendinelli (Fiat)	Bellspeed							Ret	DNS	22	22			1
50	(Italy) Federico Del Rosso (Opel)	Cherubini Racing									20				0
51	(Italy) Andrea Roda	Tomcat Racing									Ret	18			0
nc	(Italy) Massimo Giondi	LineRace Technology									23	20			0

==== Formula 2000 Light Winter Series ====
Race point system
Position	1st	2nd	3rd	4th	5th	6th	7th	8th	9th	10th	11th	12th	13th	14th	15th
Points	32	28	24	22	20	18	16	14	12	10	8	6	4	2	1

3 points for pole position and 2 points for the fastest driver in each lap.

Pos	Driver	Team	(Italy) Adria November 8–9		Points
Pos	Driver	Team	1	2	Points
1	(Chile) Martin Scuncio (−)	CO2 Motorsport	1*	1	66
2	(Italy) Giovanni Venturini (−)	CO2 Motorsport	2	2	56
3	(Italy) Alberto Bassi	CO2 Motorsport	4	6	40
4	(Germany) Thiemo Storz	CO2 Motorsport	3	10	37
5	(Italy) Pierlugi Veronesi	CO2 Motorsport	5	8	34
6	(France) Christophe Vernet	AP Motorsport	8	5	34
7	(Italy) Domenico Ferlito	Tomcat Racing	7	7	32
8	(Italy) Luca Pizzico	TJ Emme	6	9	30
9	(Belgium) Ludwig Ghidi (−)	CO2 Motorsport	Ret 13	4	29
10	(Italy) Mauro Brozzi (F3)	Bellspeed	Ret 14	3*	28
11	(Italy) Luca Spiga (−)	Emmegi Racing	9	14	16
12	(Italy) Andrea Leoni	Alan Racing	11	11	16
13	(Italy) Marco Spiga (+)	Emmegi Racing	10	13	12
14	(Italy) Luigi Folloni (F3)	Bellspeed	12	15	7
15	(Italy) Gilles Pagani (F3)	Alan Racing	Ret	12	6
16	(Italy) Fabrizio Comi	Alan Racing	Ret 15	Ret	1

=== LATAM Challenge Series season ===
This is the first season of the Latin American (LATAM) Challenge Series held in Mexico. The series uses Tatuus Formula Renault 2.0L F4RS engines and Khumo tyres.

There are 2 races by venue.

Pos	Driver	Team	(Mexico) Amozoc April 5–6		(Mexico) Águila April 25–26		(Mexico) Tangamanga May 24–25		(Mexico) Querétaro June 21–22		(Mexico) Zacatecas August 9–10		(Mexico) Guadalajara September 6–7		(Mexico) Chihuahua October 11–12		(Mexico) Monterrey November 29–30		Points
Pos	Driver	Team	1	2	3	4	5	6	7	8	9	10	11	12	13	14	15	16	Points
1	(Venezuela) Giancarlo Serenelli	R/E Racing																	306
2	(Costa Rica) André Solano	Team Costa Rica																	174
3	(Mexico) Hugo Oliveras	Megaracing Motorsport																	152
4	(Costa Rica) Javier Collado	Team Costa Rica																	148
5	(Mexico) David Farías	R/E Racing																	140
6	(Mexico) Gerardo Nieto	R/E Racing																	140
7	(Mexico) Carlos Arellano	Único Racing																	126
8	(Mexico) Homero Richards	Único Racing																	100
9	(Mexico) Juan Carlos Sistos	Megaracing Motorsport																	96
10	(Guatemala) Juan Pablo Glover	Megaracing Motorsport																	94
11	(Mexico) Patrick Goeters	Megaracing Motorsport																	60
12	(Mexico) Martín Fuentes	R/E Racing																	56
13	(Mexico) Daniel Morales	Dynamic Motorsports																	56
14	(Venezuela) Juan Camilo Acosta	JL Racing																	52
15	(Costa Rica) José Andrés Montalto	Team Costa Rica																	38
16	(Mexico) Rodrigo Peralta	JL Racing																	34
17	(Mexico) Alejandro Cortinas	JL Racing																	30
18	(Mexico) Javier Echeverría	Dynamic Motorsports																	22
19	(Mexico) Oscar Kuri	Dynamic Motorsports																	20
20	(Mexico) David García	Único Racing																	16
21	(Mexico) Ricardo Marroquin	RAM Racing																	12
22	(Mexico) Carlos Medina	JL Racing																	10
23	(Mexico) Alejandro Aguilera																		8
24	(Mexico) Alejandro Capín	Megaracing Motorsport																	4
25	(Mexico) Piero Rodarte	Megaracing Motorsport																	4
26	(Mexico) Enrique Baca	Dynamic Motorsport																	4
27	(Mexico) Mario Ochoa	Megaracing Motorsport																	2
28	(Mexico) Oscar Paredes Arroyo	Dynamic Motorsport																	0
29	(Mexico) Enrique Vázquez	Único Racing																	0
30	(Mexico) José Luis Cortinas	JL Racing																	0

=== Fórmula Renault Plus season ===
The series is held in the same rounds as its secondary series, Fórmula Renault Interprovencial.

Race point system
Position	1st	2nd	3rd	4th	5th	6th	7th	8th	9th	10th
Points	20	15	12	10	8	6	4	3	2	1

1 point is given for pole position and all drivers receive a point for taking part in the qualifying session.

The calendar includes 12 rounds:

1. Marcos Juárez Motor Club Circuit (February 24)
2. Autódromo Ciudad De Río Cuarto (March 16)
3. Marcos Juárez Motor Club Circuit (April 20)
4. Autódromo Oscar Cabalén (May 11)
5. Marcos Juárez Motor Club Circuit (July 13)
6. Autódromo San Jorge (August 3)
7. Autódromo Oscar Cabalén (August 24)
8. Autódromo Ciudad De Río Cuarto (September 14)
9. Autódromo Oscar Cabalén (October 5)
10. Autódromo San Jorge (October 19)
11. Autódromo Ciudad De Río Cuarto (November 9)
12. Autódromo Oscar Cabalén (November 30)

Pos	Driver	Team	Points
1	(Argentina) Mario Gerbaldo		185
2	(Argentina) Damián Mari		110
3	(Argentina) Pablo Perotti		81
4	(Argentina) Lucas Bagneras		81
5	(Argentina) Alan Castellano		5
6	(Argentina) Esteban Cinquini		64
7	(Argentina) Pablo Teres		45
8	(Argentina) Franco Girolami		43
9	(Argentina) Sebastián Gallo		43
10	(Argentina) Roberto Luna		39
11	(Argentina) Alfredo Martini		30
12	(Argentina) Mariano Toia		23
13	(Argentina) Julia Ballario	Baypal Scuderia	23
14	(Argentina) Amadis N. Farina		22
15	(Argentina) Franco Bosio		16
16	(Argentina) Nestor Barovero	Barovero Racing Team	14
17	(Argentina) Santiago Viscovich		13
18	(Argentina) Roberto Arato		11
19	(Argentina) Rubén Santana		11
20	(Argentina) Gustavo Cerutti		11
21	(Argentina) Joaquin Gassman		10
22	(Argentina) Alexandro Polidori		9
23	(Argentina) Raúl Gorordo	Pergamino Racing	9
24	(Argentina) Santiago Ghisiglieri		7
25	(Argentina) Matías Cantarini	Cantarini Competicion	7
26	(Argentina) Juan Pablo Cravero		6
27	(Argentina) Juan Pablo Barrucca		6
28	(Argentina) Rosso Victor		4
29	(Argentina) Juan.C Aimar		4
30	(Argentina) Marcelo Ciarrochi		4
31	(Argentina) Juan Manuel Cabalen		3
32	(Argentina) Franco Mezzelani		3
33	(Argentina) Mauro Desabato		3
34	(Argentina) Leonardo Martino		3
35	(Argentina) Vicente Ripani		2
36	(Argentina) Violeta Pernice		2
37	(Argentina) Germán Monney		1
38	(Argentina) Javier Ferreyra		1
39	(Argentina) Danilo d'Angelo		1
40	(Argentina) Daniel Gabarra		1
41	(Argentina) Diego Casale		1
42	(Argentina) Brian Bauduco		1
43	(Argentina) Miguel Villagomez		1

=== Fórmula Renault Interprovencial season ===
The series is held in the same rounds as its main series, Fórmula Renault Plus.

Race point system
Position	1st	2nd	3rd	4th	5th	6th	7th	8th	9th	10th
Points	20	15	12	10	8	6	4	3	2	1

1 point is given for pole position and all drivers receive a point for taking part in the qualifying session.

Pos	Driver	Team	Points
1	(Argentina) Fabricio Fernandez		214
2	(Argentina) Matías Cantarini		159
3	(Argentina) Darío Elisei		132
4	(Argentina) Daniel Gabarra		86
5	(Argentina) Franco Mezzelani		72
6	(Argentina) Federico Pancello		71
7	(Argentina) Gastón Mantegari		69
8	(Argentina) Raúl Gorordo	Pergamino Racing	63
9	(Argentina) Juan Gabarra		56
10	(Argentina) Adrían Alfango		51
11	(Argentina) Maximiliano Terzoni		42
12	(Argentina) Darío Fabro		28
13	(Argentina) María José Lorenzatti		25
14	(Argentina) Javier Ferreyra		20
15	(Argentina) Danilo D'Angelo		19
16	(Argentina) José Domesi		18
17	(Argentina) Jorge Minetti		17
18	(Argentina) Darío Necochea		15
19	(Argentina) Lucas Bagnera		14
20	(Argentina) Mario Marinucci		14
21	(Argentina) German Massa		11
22	(Argentina) Juan C. Micheli		9
23	(Argentina) Brian Bauduco		6
24	(Argentina) Dino Gardini		5
25	(Argentina) Matías Reimondi		3
26	(Argentina) Alejandro Roani		2
27	(Argentina) Juan P. Cravero		2
28	(Argentina) Pablo Teres		2
29	(Argentina) Juan José Della Santina	Della Santina Competición	2
30	(Argentina) Hernan Bueno		1

=== Fórmula 4 Metropolitana season ===
This is the first season of the Fórmula 4 Metropolitana series held in Argentina. Cars use the Renault Clio K4M engine (1598cc) with low power. Different from the former Fórmula 4 Nacional series held in 2007, teams can choose their chassis manufacturer; Crespi, Tulia, Tito, etc.

The calendar includes 11 rounds in 3 venues:

1. (April 13) Autódromo Roberto Mouras
2. (May 4) Autódromo Sudamericano de Olavarría
3. (June 8) Autódromo Roberto Mouras
4. (June 29) Autódromo 9 de Julio
5. (July 20) Autódromo Roberto Mouras
6. (August 10) Autódromo Sudamericano de Olavarría
7. (August 31) Autódromo Roberto Mouras
8. (September 21) Autódromo 9 de Julio
9. (October 19) Autódromo Roberto Mouras
10. (November 09) Autódromo Roberto Mouras
11. (November 30) Autódromo Roberto Mouras

Pos	Driver	Team	Points
1	(Argentina) Alan Castellano	Scudería Ramini	118
2	(Argentina) Gastón Crusitta	Casalins Competición	107
3	(Argentina) Ezequiel Bongiovanni		82
4	(Argentina) Emiliano Gonzalez	Speedy González Performance	82
5	(Argentina) Bernardo Poggi	Ré Competición	68
1	(Argentina) Leonardo Martino		
1	(Argentina) Violeta Pernice		
1	(Argentina) Juan Barucca		
1	(Argentina) Pablo Lemoine		
1	(Argentina) María Abate	Ré Competición, Casalins Competición	
1	(Argentina) Hernán Costa	Scuderia Ramini	
1	(Argentina) Gabriel Soncini		
1	(Argentina) Martin Melhem		
1	(Argentina) Enzo Pieraligi		
1	(Argentina) Juan José Garriz	Ré Competición	
1	(Argentina) Lucas Alonso	Scudería Ramini	
1	(Argentina) Nicolás Dambolena		
1	(Argentina) Rubén Santana	Scudería Ramini	
1	(Argentina) Pablo Constanzo	Ré Competición	
1	(Argentina) Sebastian Pernigotte		
1	(Argentina) Federico Moisés	RSX Motorsport	
1	(Argentina) Franco Girolami		
1	(Argentina) Emanuel Girón		
1	(Argentina) Mauricio Allochis		
1	(Argentina) Bruno Etmann		
1	(Argentina) Juan Ignacio Landa		
1	(Argentina) Gonzalo Perlo		
1	(Argentina) Alan Ruggero	Ré Competición	
1	(Argentina) Federico Fastuca		
1	(Argentina) Gerardo Risso		
1	(Argentina) Ayrton Molina		
1	(Argentina) Rodolfo Urriticoechea	Tati Motorsport	
1	(Argentina) Julián Falivene	Tati Motorsport	
1	(Argentina) Santiago Viscouvich		
1	(Argentina) Mario Gerbaldo		
1	(Argentina) Mario Gerbaldo		
1	(Argentina) Claudio Dinoto Rama		
1	(Argentina) Mario Gerbaldo		

=== Formula Asia 2.0 season ===
The 2008 season is the first season for the Formula Asia 2.0 series. The series offers a prize for the best Asian driver in the Asian Drivers Cup.

Race point system
Position	1st	2nd	3rd	4th	5th	6th	7th	8th	9th	10th
Points	20	15	12	10	8	6	4	3	2	1

Only the two best-placed drivers in each team at each race will receive points for the team championship.

Rounds 10 and 11 in Shanghai on November 22–23 don't count towards the championship as there was insufficient preparation time due to the delay in the release of the containers by the local customs.

Pos	Driver	Team	(Malaysia) Sepang May 17–18			(Malaysia) Sepang June 14–15		(Thailand) Bira August 16–17		(Thailand) Bira September 6–7		(China) Shanghai November 22–23 (Note: Rounds 10 and 11 don't count towards the championship.)		(China) Shanghai December 6–7				Points
Pos	Driver	Team	1	2	3	4	5	6	7	8	9	10	11	12	13	14	15	Points
1	(Sweden) Felix Rosenqvist	March 3 Racing	2	1*	1	1*	1*	1*	1	1*	Ret	?	3	2	1	1	1	215
2	(France) Matthias Beche	Champ Motorsport(1–9), Asia Racing Team(10–15)	1*	2	2*	4	5	3	3	5	4	1	2	Ret	3	2*	2*	144
3	(Indonesia) Rio Haryanto	Asia Racing Team	8	6	10	8	7	4	2*	4	2	3	1	1*	2*	4	3	121
4	(Japan) Yuki Iwasaki	Dyna Ten Motorsports	6	3	8	2	4	5	5	3	5	4	?	Ret	4	3	4	111
5	(Japan) Yoshitaka Kuroda	Asia Racing Team	4	Ret	5	5	3	2	4	Ret	3	5	?	4	5	5	7	107
6	(China) Dai Wei Zhu	March 3 Racing	10	5	6	3	2	6	9					3	7	6	6	81
7	(United States) Ryan Booth	Asia Racing Team	5	7	9	7	10	8	6	2	1							64
8	(France) Benjamin Rouget	March 3 Racing	3	4	3	11	8	Ret	7	DNS	DNS							41
9	(Indonesia) Ryan Haryanto	Champ Motorsport												Ret	6	7	5	18
10	(China) Zhendong Zhang	March 3 Racing	9	8	7	9	9											16
11	(Switzerland) Gary Hirsch	Champ Motorsport				6	6											12
12	(Thailand) Robert Boughey	March 3 Racing	DNS	DNS	4			7	8									7
13	(Venezuela) Samin Gomez Briceno	March 3 Racing	11	9	11	10	11											5
14	(France) Vincent Capillaire	Asia Racing Team	7	Ret	Ret													4
15	(Mexico) Karl Martinez Vergara	Asia Racing Team						Ret	10									1
nc	(Germany) Mateusz Adamski	Asia Racing Team										2	?					–

Pos	Team	Points
1	March 3 Racing	333
2	Asia Racing Team	288
3	Champ Motorsport	140
4	Dyna Ten Motorsports	115

== Notes ==
Colour	Result
Gold	Winner
Silver	2nd place
Bronze	3rd place
Green	Finished, in points
Green	Retired, in points
Blue	Finished, no points
Purple	Did not finish (Ret)
Purple	Not classified (NC)
Red	Did not qualify (DNQ)
Black	Disqualified (DSQ)
White	Did not start (DNS)
White	Withdrew (WD)
Blank	Did not participate
Blank	Injured (INJ)
Blank	Excluded (EX)
**Bold**	Pole position
*	Fastest lap
spr	Sprint Race
fea	Feature Race
