= Autodromo Internacional de Yahuarcocha =

Motorsport circuit in Ibarra, Ecuador

Autodromo Internacional José Tobar
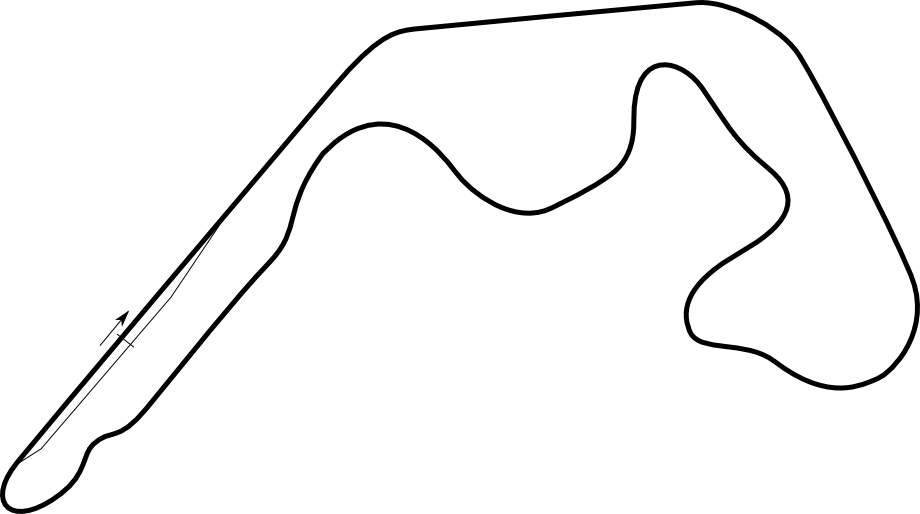
- Current Clockwise Circuit (1983–present)

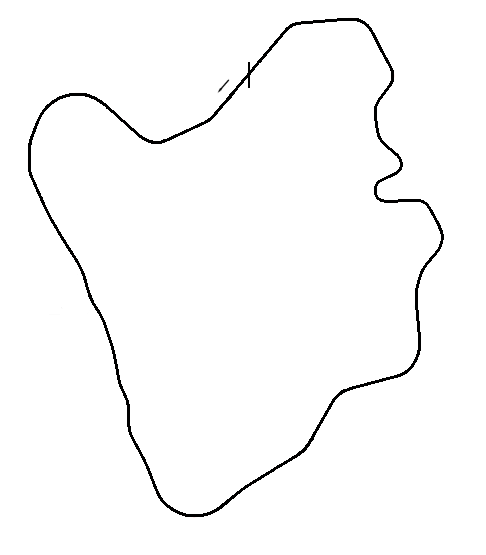
- Original Anti-Clockwise Circuit (1970–1983)
- Location: Ibarra, Ecuador
- Coordinates: 0°22′48″N 78°5′48″W
- Broke ground: 16 May 1963; 62 years ago
- Opened: 2 May 1970; 55 years ago
- Former names: Autodromo Internacional de Yahuarcocha
- Major events: Former: Panam GP Series (2006–2007, 2012)

Current Circuit (1983–present)
- Length: 3.6 km (2.2 mi)
- Turns: 16

Original Circuit (1970–1983)
- Length: 10 km (6.2 mi)
- Turns: 25

The Autódromo Internacional José Tobar, formerly known as the Autodromo Internacional de Yahuarcocha, is a motorsport circuit located in Ibarra, Ecuador, around the lake Yawarkucha. It has hosted events in the Panam GP Series. During the 1960s the construction of the new and current layout was ordered and it came into shape and was finished by the start of the 1970s, with a new and smaller layout due to the old layout being ruled too dangerous given the danger of crashing in water. The circuit is currently used for local motor-sport events; national motor-sports championship or single events, which are composed my amateur and/or semi-professional teams. The most featured and important race is the "Larga Duracion", which consists of 6 hours of endurance racing and brings participants from neighboring countries to participate. The circuit's facilities are outdated, and have not been renewed since around mid 1990s, including paddock, grandstands and pit-lane.

The course is the closest FIA-graded track to the Equator.

== Autódromo Mayor ==
This version of the track is no longer active. The layout is around 10 km (6.2 mi) and currently is used as a road to access the near neighborhood that have grown near the circuit.

== Autódromo Internacional José Tobar ==
The current course is 3.6 km (2.2 mi) long. It has a clock-wise layout, with high and medium speed corners with slight changes of elevation in the first and middle sectors, and by the final corner, a slightly steep hairpin to the right, after which comes the Home Straight. Some current major events include:

- Larga Duracion (6h Endurance Race)
- Drag Racing on home straight
- National Championship Dates
- Semi-Truck Events
