= Emmebi Motorsport =

(Italy) Emmebi Motorsport
- Founded: 2000
- Team principal(s): Massimo Beacco
- Current series: Lamborghini Super Trofeo
- Former series: Superbike World Championship; Formula Renault 2.0 Italia; Auto GP; Formule Renault 2.0 Suisse; Formula 2000 Light; Formula Abarth

Emmebi Motorsport was an auto racing team based in Italy.
