= Autódromo Pedro Cofiño =

Race track in Escuintla, Guatemala

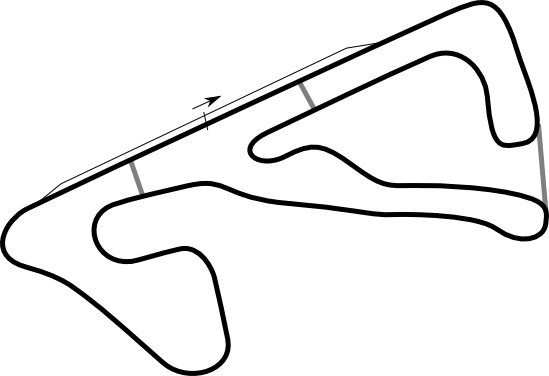
- Full Course (2002–present)
- Location: Escuintla, Guatemala
- Coordinates: 14°22′57″N 90°49′14″W
- Opened: 2002
- Former names: Autódromo Los Volcanes (2002–2007)
- Major events: Former: Panam GP Series (2005–2007, 2012)
- Website: http://autodromopedrocofino.com/guatemala/

Full Course (2002–present)
- Length: 2.400 km (1.491 mi)

Autódromo Pedro Cofiño is a 2.400 km (1.491 mi) race track located in Escuintla, Guatemala. The race track was inaugurated in 2002 as Autódromo Los Volcanes. In 2007 it was renamed after the late Guatemalan racing driver Pedro Cofiño.

== Fatalities ==
Pedro Cofiño was killed when he was hit in the circuit's pitlane by another car.
