= 2008 Formula 3 Sudamericana season =

2008 Formula 3 Sudamericana

Seasons
- ← 2007 2009 →

The 2008 Formula 3 Sudamericana season was the 22nd Formula 3 Sudamericana season. It began on 19 April 2008, at Autódromo Internacional de Curitiba and ended on 30 November at Autódromo José Carlos Pace in São Paulo. Brazilian driver Nelson Merlo won the title.

== Drivers and teams ==
- All drivers competed in Pirelli-shod, Berta-powered Dallara F301s. All teams were Brazilian-registered.

Team	No	Driver	Rounds
Cesário Fórmula	1	(Brazil) Pedro Enrique	All
Cesário Fórmula	2	(Brazil) Leonardo Cordeiro	All
Cesário Fórmula Júnior	3	(Brazil) Denis Navarro	All
Cesário Fórmula Júnior	4	(Brazil) Renan Bussiere	2–6, 8–9
Amir Nasr Racing	5	(Brazil) Rodolpho Santos	1–4
Razia Sports	5	(Brazil) Rodolpho Santos	5
Razia Sports	17	(Brazil) Luiz Boesel	1–2, 4–6
Razia Sports	17	(Brazil) Yann Cunha	3, 7, 9
Razia Sports	17	(Uruguay) Gerardo Salaverria	8
Razia Sports	18	(Brazil) Eduardo Leite	1, 2
Razia Sports	18	(Brazil) Daniel Landi	4
Razia Sports	18	(Argentina) Facundo Crovo	5
Razia Sports	18	(Brazil) Henrique Lambert	6
Razia Sports	18	(Uruguay) Wilfredo Pomés	8
PropCar Racing	7	(Brazil) Fernando Galera	1–4
PropCar Racing	7	(Argentina) Guido Falaschi	5
PropCar Racing	7	(Brazil) Nilton Molina	7–9
PropCar Racing	8	(Brazil) Werner Neugebauer	All
Bassani Racing	9	(Brazil) Nilton Molina	2–3
Bassani Racing	15	(Brazil) Nilton Molina	4–6
Bassani Racing	10	(Brazil) Nelson Merlo	All
Bassan Motorsport	14	(Brazil) Felipe Ferreira	1–2, 4–6
Bassan Motorsport	14	(Brazil) Tiago Pinheiros	7
Bassan Motorsport	14	(Brazil) Fernando Galera	8–9
Meyer	22	(Brazil) Paulo Meyer	8–9
Baumer Racing	27	(Brazil) Luiz Boesel	3
Baumer Racing	27	(Brazil) Lucilio Baumer	7
Nacional Sports	61	(Brazil) Leonardo Otero	All
Kemba Racing	91	(Brazil) Leonardo de Souza	1–2, 4–5, 7–9

== Race calendar and results ==
Round		Location	Circuit	Date	Pole position	Fastest lap	Winning driver	Supporting
1	R1	Pinhais, Brazil	Autódromo Internacional de Curitiba	19 April	(Brazil) Denis Navarro	(Brazil) Denis Navarro	(Brazil) Denis Navarro	Stand-alone event
1	R2	Pinhais, Brazil	Autódromo Internacional de Curitiba	20 April	(Brazil) Denis Navarro	(Brazil) Denis Navarro	(Brazil) Denis Navarro	Stand-alone event
2	R1	São Paulo, Brazil	Autódromo José Carlos Pace	10 May	(Brazil) Denis Navarro	(Brazil) Denis Navarro	(Brazil) Pedro Enrique	Stand-alone event
2	R2	São Paulo, Brazil	Autódromo José Carlos Pace	11 May	(Brazil) Denis Navarro	(Brazil) Pedro Enrique	(Brazil) Nelson Merlo	Stand-alone event
3	R1	Brasília, Brazil	Brasília	14 June	(Brazil) Pedro Enrique	(Brazil) Pedro Enrique	(Brazil) Pedro Enrique	Stand-alone event
3	R2	Brasília, Brazil	Brasília	15 June	(Brazil) Pedro Enrique	(Brazil) Pedro Enrique	(Brazil) Pedro Enrique	Stand-alone event
4	R1	São Paulo, Brazil	Autódromo José Carlos Pace	12 July	(Brazil) Leonardo Cordeiro	(Brazil) Leonardo Cordeiro	(Brazil) Pedro Enrique	Stand-alone event
4	R2	São Paulo, Brazil	Autódromo José Carlos Pace	13 July	(Brazil) Leonardo Cordeiro	(Brazil) Leonardo Cordeiro	(Brazil) Nelson Merlo	Stand-alone event
5	R1	Buenos Aires, Argentina	Autódromo Juan y Oscar Gálvez	9 August	(Brazil) Pedro Enrique	(Brazil) Nelson Merlo	(Brazil) Nelson Merlo	Buenos Aires Grand Prix
5	R2	Buenos Aires, Argentina	Autódromo Juan y Oscar Gálvez	10 August	(Brazil) Denis Navarro	(Argentina) Guido Falaschi	(Brazil) Nelson Merlo	Buenos Aires Grand Prix
6	R1	Rio de Janeiro, Brazil	Jacarepaguá	6 September	(Brazil) Leonardo Otero	(Brazil) Nelson Merlo	(Brazil) Nelson Merlo	Stand-alone event
6	R2	Rio de Janeiro, Brazil	Jacarepaguá	7 September	(Brazil) Leonardo Otero	(Brazil) Nelson Merlo	(Brazil) Nelson Merlo	Stand-alone event
7	R1	Santa Cruz do Sul, Brazil	Autódromo Internacional de Santa Cruz do Sul	11 October	(Brazil) Nelson Merlo	(Brazil) Leonardo Cordeiro	(Brazil) Nelson Merlo	Stand-alone event
7	R2	Santa Cruz do Sul, Brazil	Autódromo Internacional de Santa Cruz do Sul	12 October	(Brazil) Nelson Merlo	(Brazil) Leonardo Cordeiro	(Brazil) Nelson Merlo	Stand-alone event
8	R1	Pinhais, Brazil	Autódromo Internacional de Curitiba	15 November	(Brazil) Leonardo Cordeiro	(Brazil) Pedro Enrique	(Brazil) Pedro Enrique	Stand-alone event
8	R2	Pinhais, Brazil	Autódromo Internacional de Curitiba	16 November	(Brazil) Leonardo Cordeiro	(Brazil) Leonardo Cordeiro	(Brazil) Leonardo Cordeiro	Stand-alone event
9	R1	São Paulo, Brazil	Autódromo José Carlos Pace	29 November	(Brazil) Leonardo Cordeiro	(Brazil) Denis Navarro	(Brazil) Denis Navarro	Stand-alone event
9	R2	São Paulo, Brazil	Autódromo José Carlos Pace	30 November	(Brazil) Denis Navarro	(Brazil) Denis Navarro	(Brazil) Denis Navarro	Stand-alone event

== Championship standings ==
Pos	Driver	CUR 1 (Brazil)	CUR 2 (Brazil)	INT 1 (Brazil)	INT 2 (Brazil)	BRA 1 (Brazil)	BRA 2 (Brazil)	INT 1 (Brazil)	INT 2 (Brazil)	BUE 1 (Argentina)	BUE 2 (Argentina)	JAC 1 (Brazil)	JAC 2 (Brazil)	SCZ 1 (Brazil)	SCZ 2 (Brazil)	CUR 1 (Brazil)	CUR 2 (Brazil)	INT 1 (Brazil)	INT 2 (Brazil)	Pts
1	(Brazil) Nelson Merlo	2	3	6	1	Ret	4	5	1	1	1	1	1	**1**	**1**	Ret	3	2	2	128
2	(Brazil) Pedro Enrique	3	DNS	1	2	**1**	**1**	1	Ret	**4**	2	2	3	4	4	1	4	3	Ret	112
3	(Brazil) Denis Navarro	**1**	**1**	**4**	**7**	2	2	6	7	3	**3**	3	4	3	DNS	Ret	2	1	**1**	105
4	(Brazil) Leonardo Cordeiro	8	2	3	3	5	5	**3**	**10**	Ret	Ret	Ret	9	5	3	**2**	**1**	**4**	3	74
5	(Brazil) Leonardo Otero	DNS	DNS	Ret	4	6	6	7	4	6	7	**Ret**	**2**	10	8	5	5	Ret	5	44
6	(Brazil) Werner Neugebauer	5	10	DNS	6	7	11	Ret	9	5	5	5	Ret	Ret	6	3	6	7	6	38
7	(Brazil) Fernando Galera	10	7	2	DNS	4	3	12	DNS							4	Ret	8	8	28
8	(Brazil) Luiz Boesel	6	6	9	11	8	7	4	3	13	8	DNS	6							24
9	(Brazil) Leonardo de Souza	7	9	DNS	Ret			Ret	5	11	6			8	Ret	6	7	5	4	24
10	(Brazil) Lucilio Baumer													2	2					16
11	(Brazil) Daniel Landi							2	2											16
12	(Brazil) Rodolpho Santos	DNS	8	7	8	3	8	10	6	10	Ret									14
13	(Brazil) Felipe Ferreira	4	5	8	10			8	Ret	8	10	DNS	7							14
14	(Argentina) Guido Falaschi									2	4									13
15	(Brazil) Eduardo Leite	9	4	5	5															13
16	(Brazil) Renan Bussiere			11	12	Ret	10	9	8	9	Ret	4	5			Ret	8	10	Ret	11
17	(Brazil) Nilton Molina			10	9	10	Ret	11	DNS	12	11	Ret	8	7	7	Ret	9	6	7	10
18	(Brazil) Tiago Pinheiros													6	5					7
19	(Brazil) Henrique Lambert											6	10							3
20	(Argentina) Facundo Crovo									7	9									2
21	(Brazil) Yann Cunha					9	9							9	Ret			Ret	9	0
guest drivers ineligible for championship points
	(Brazil) Paulo Meyer															7	10	9	10	0
	(Uruguay) Wilfredo Pomés															8	11			0
	(Uruguay) Gerardo Salaverria															9	12			0
Pos	Driver	CUR 1 (Brazil)	CUR 2 (Brazil)	INT 1 (Brazil)	INT 2 (Brazil)	BRA 1 (Brazil)	BRA 2 (Brazil)	INT 1 (Brazil)	INT 2 (Brazil)	BUE 1 (Argentina)	BUE 2 (Argentina)	JAC 1 (Brazil)	JAC 2 (Brazil)	SCZ 1 (Brazil)	SCZ 2 (Brazil)	CUR 1 (Brazil)	CUR 2 (Brazil)	INT 1 (Brazil)	INT 2 (Brazil)	Pts

Colour	Result
Gold	Winner
Silver	Second place
Bronze	Third place
Green	Points classification
Blue	Non-points classification
Blue	Non-classified finish (NC)
Purple	Retired, not classified (Ret)
Red	Did not qualify (DNQ)
Red	Did not pre-qualify (DNPQ)
Black	Disqualified (DSQ)
White	Did not start (DNS)
White	Withdrew (WD)
White	Race cancelled (C)
Blank	Did not practice (DNP)
Blank	Did not arrive (DNA)
Blank	Excluded (EX)

**Bold** – Pole
Italics – Fastest Lap
