= 2008 Buenos Aires Grand Prix Race 2 =

The Buenos Aires Circuit No:9

Results from the 2008 Buenos Aires Grand Prix held at Buenos Aires on August 10, 2008, in the Autódromo Oscar Alfredo Gálvez.The race was the second race for the 2008 Buenos Aires Grand Prix of Formula Three Sudamericana.

== Classification ==
| Pos | Driver | Constructor | Laps | Time/Retired |
|---|---|---|---|---|
| 1 | (Brazil) Nelson Merlo | Dallara-Berta | 25 | 30;52,814 |
| 2 | (Brazil) Pedro Nunes | Dallara-Berta | 25 | |
| 3 | (Brazil) Denis Navarro | Dallara-Berta | 25 | |
| 4 | (Argentina) Guido Falaschi | Dallara-Berta | 25 | |
| 5 | (Brazil) Werner Neugebauer | Dallara-Berta | 25 | |
| 6 | (Brazil) Leonardo de Souza | Dallara-Berta | 25 | |
| 7 | (Brazil) Leonardo Otero | Dallara-Berta | | |
| 8 | (Brazil) Luiz Boesel | Dallara-Berta | | |
| 9 | (Argentina) Facundo Crovo | Dallara-Berta | | |
| Ret | (Brazil) Felipe Ferreira | Dallara-Berta | | DNF |
| Ret | (Brazil) Nilton Molina | Dallara-Berta | | DNF |
| Ret | (Brazil) Renan Bussiere | Dallara-Berta | | DNF |
| Ret | (Brazil) Leonardo Cordeiro | Dallara-Berta | | DNF |
| Ret | (Brazil) Rodolpho Santos | Dallara-Berta | | DNF |
