= 2005 Formula Renault seasons =

2005 seasons of formula car racing

2005 Formula Renault

Seasons
- ← 2004 2006 →

This page describes all the 2005 seasons of Formula Renault series.

== Formula Renault 2.0L ==
=== 2005 Championnat de France Formula Renault 2.0 season ===
- Point system : 15, 12, 10, 8, 6, 5, 4, 3, 2, 1 for 10th. In each race 1 point for Fastest lap and 1 for Pole position.

Pos	Driver	Team	(France) NOG March 27–28		(France) LED April 16–17		(France) PAU May 6–7		(France) DIJ May 28–29		(France) VIE June 25–26		(France) LEM July 8–10		(France) ALB September 3–4		(France) MAG October 15–16		Points
Pos	Driver	Team	1	2	3	4	5	6	7	8	9	10	11	12	13	14	15	16	Points
1	(France) Romain Grosjean	SG Formula	2	3	Ret	5*	1*	1*	1*	1*	DSQ	1*	1	1	1*	1*	1*	2	211
2	(France) Laurent Groppi	Graff Racing	1	2	6	3	3	2	2	2	Ret	3	2	2	2	3	2	3*	170
3	(France) Ulric Amado	Graff Racing	4	6*	1	2	4	Ret	3	3	3	4	4	3	5	8	7	6	124
4	(France) Johan Charpilienne	SG Formula	3	5	4	4	21	3	Ret	5	1*	5	7	7	17	7	3	4	100
5	(France) Franck Mailleux	SG Formula	6	29	2	1	6	Ret	8	9	8	8	5	5	8	5	5	5	81
6	(France) Julien Jousse	SG Formula	DNS	4	Ret	14	7	Ret	4	23	9	15	6	6	3	2	Ret	1	70
7	(France) Malo Olivier	Hexis Racing	11	8	7*	Ret	8	5	6	8	2	2			4	4	10	10	67
8	(United Kingdom) Westley Barber	Comtec Racing	5	1	13	12	9	Ret	3	4	6	6							52
9	(France) Nicolas Navarro (R)	Graff Racing	13	13	12	10	12	9	7	4	4	13	8		10	10	6	8	36
10	(France) Nicolas Prost	Graff Racing	7	DNS	11	11	5	4	5	22	5	9			18	13	13	19	32
11	(Belgium) Bertrand Baguette (R)	Epsilon Sport	Ret	22	Ret	17	2	18	Ret	16	7	Ret		12	6	9	8	7	30
12	(France) Jacky Ferré (R)	Graff Racing	Ret	10	3	8	Ret	10	9	7	10	7		8	DNS	11	Ret	20	29
13	(France) Nelson Panciatici (R)	Epsilon Sport	10	9	15	23	10	11	23	6	13	10			7	6	17	11	19
14	(France) Julien Canal	Graff Racing	9	11			Ret	6						11			4	9	17
15	(France) Pierre Ragues	Epsilon Sport	8	12	9	6	14	8	13	10	14	17	10	13			9	14	17
16	(France) Damien Claverie	Tech 1 Racing	Ret	7	14	18	Ret	7	17	13	19	14			11	14	11	Ret	8
17	(France) Bruce Lorgeré-Roux	MC Racing	16	Ret	8	7	15	13	10	12	15	19			19	18	Ret	13	8
18	(France) Thomas Accary (R)	Pôle Services	Ret	14	10	9	22	20	18	Ret	11	11	9	9	20	Ret	14	Ret	7
19	(France) Johan-Boris Scheier	Energy Racing	12	Ret	5	Ret	13	12	11	15	18	DNS							6
20	(France) Adrien Paviot (R)	Pôle Services	DNS	15	17	Ret	19	14	12	11	16	Ret			9	Ret	Ret	Ret	2
21	(United Kingdom) Pippa Mann	Comtec Racing	18	Ret	24	22	Ret	17			Ret	21		10			19	17	1
22	(France) Stéphane Freve (R)	SCF Compétition	Ret	18	20	13	17	16	14	Ret	12	16			13	12	18	22	0
23	(France) Stéphanie Tesson	Pôle Services	15	25	21	15	16	Ret	16	21	17	12			14	15	16	18	0
24	(France) Rodolphe Hauchard	RBA Sport	Ret	23	19	19	Ret	21	21	18	23	23			DNS	19	21	21	0
25	(France) Mathieu Santi (R)	Hexis Racing	Ret	26	18	Ret	20	19	DNS	DNS	Ret	24			16	20	Ret	24	0
26	(France) Florian Boukobza (R)	Hexis Racing	DNS	16	16	Ret	18	15	15	14	Ret	18							0
27	(France) Sylvain Milesi	Racing Team Trajectoire	22	17	22	16			19	17	22	20			Ret	17	20	23	0
28	(France) Kevin Cozic (R)	MC Racing	21	27	Ret	21	Ret	22	20	19	21	Ret							0
29	(France) Thomas Mich (R)	MC Racing	20	19	25	24			22	20									0
30	(France) Tom Dillmann (R)	MC Racing							Ret	DNS					15	Ret	15	12	0
31	(France) Daniel Harout	Lycée D'Artagnan	14	21							20	22							0
32	(Argentina) Ivo Perabó (R)	Tech 1 Racing	19	20															0
33	(Argentina) Ezequiel Bosio (R)	Tech 1 Racing	17	28															0
34	(France) Philippe Bénoliel	Pole Services			23	20													0
35	(United Kingdom) Phil Glew	Tech 1 Racing	DNS	24															0
NC	(France) Thomas Bouché	Pôle Services															22	15	0
NC	(France) Julien Joulian Falcini	Hexis Racing													12	16	12	16	0
NC	(France) Pierre Macé	TP Competition																	0
NC	(France) Simon Pagenaud	Tech 1 Racing					11	DNS											0
NC	(France) Adrien Pouchelon	Pouchelon Racing													Ret	21			0

=== 2005 Formula Renault 2.0 Italia season ===
Point system : 30, 24, 20, 16, 12, 10, 8, 6, 4, 2 for 10th. In each race 2 point for Fastest lap and 2 for Pole position.

- Races : 2 or 3 races by rounds length of 30 minutes each.

Pos	Driver	Team	(Italy) VAL Apr 10		(Italy) IMO May 15		(Belgium) SPA Jun 12		(Italy) MON Jun 26			(Italy) MUG Jul 10		(Italy) MIS Sep 4			(Italy) VAR Sep 25	(Italy) MON Oct 23		Points
Pos	Driver	Team	1	2	3	4	5	6	7	8	9	10	11	12	13	14	15	16	17	Points
1	(Japan) Kamui Kobayashi	Prema Powerteam	Ret	1	1	1	3	2	1	3*	1			6	2	5	4	1	2	254
2	(Germany) Michael Ammermuller	Jenzer Motorsport	1	2	2	2	1*	1	2	2	Ret			2	20	2	11	4	3	230
3	(United Kingdom) Ben Hanley	Cram Competition	8	19	11	5	4	Ret	11	1	2	1	1	22	1	1	2	2	1	208
4	(Belgium) Jérôme d'Ambrosio	Euronova Racing	3	5	27	7	2	4	12	6	5	3	7	5	4	7	1	9	4	179
5	(South Africa) Adrian Zaugg	Jenzer Motorsport	4	3	5	3	28	3	Ret	20	4			4	3	3	12	3	19	142
6	(Italy) Davide Rigon	BVM Minardi	6	17	3	8	9	5	7	35	30	4	2	1	16	10				113
7	(Italy) Davide Valsecchi	RP Motorsport	Ret	Ret	9	10	10	11	9	32	3	2	6	Ret	Ret	4	9	8	5	86
8	(Italy) Luca Persiani	Cram Competition	5	Ret	4	6	11	12	3	26	32	7	4							74
9	(Italy) Federico Muggia	BVM Minardi	22	16	14	4	7	6	Ret	33	Ret	8	11	3	23	Ret	Ret	21	7	52
10	(Italy) Gary Cester	BVM Minardi	25	9	29	30	6	9				6	3	7	Ret	Ret	Ret	28	10	52
11	(Austria) Reinhard Kofler	It Loox Racing Car			8	14	5	13	6	22	7	21	8	8	5	8	Ret	10	9	52
12	(Switzerland) David Oberle	Jenzer Motorsport	26	4	25	21	Ret	Ret	24	4	29			11	24	6	5	6	17	48
13	(Italy) Mauro Massironi	Alan Racing	Ret	28	6	11	12	10	10	27	6	5	5	24	19	Ret	16	14	14	47
14	(Italy) Marco Frezza	Euronova Racing	11	6	12	24	Ret	8	8	7	10	9	Ret	21	6	18	Ret	12	8	34
15	(Brazil) Carlos Iaconelli	JD Motorsport	2	10	Ret	9														30
16	(Spain) Dani Clos	Facondini Racing	16	14	7	16	8	7	Ret	21	31			9	17	9		15	Ret	28
17	(Spain) Oliver Campos-Hull	Facondini Racing	Ret	Ret	15	Ret	27	15	19	23	20	11	10	10	7	Ret	3	5	6	27
18	(Colombia) Federico Montoya	Jenzer Motorsport	Ret	12	18	12	Ret	Ret	4	12	13			12	Ret	13	7	11	Ret	16
19	(Italy) Marcello Puglisi	JD Motorsport	7	7	Ret	32	13	Ret	16	24	26									16
20	(Italy) Simona de Silvestro	Cram Competition	9	20	Ret	Ret	19	17	14	5	9	14	Ret	17	9	Ret	Ret	16	11	16
21	(Finland) Mika Leirilaakso	RP Motorsport	24	8	10	20	18	Ret	Ret	29	16	12	9							12
22	(Italy) Nicola Gianniberti	It Loox Racing Car															6			10
23	(Italy) Alex Frassineti	Cek Team	23	13	24	13	21	20	13	37	Ret	17	16	23	8	11	8	7		9
24	(Italy) Manuele Gatto	Viola Formula Racing	13	Ret	16	Ret	29	14	15	8	8									9
25	(Italy) Matteo Chinosi	Prema Powerteam	27	15	26	18	30	26	5	17	11	20	14	Ret	22	22	Ret	25	Ret	6
26	(Italy) Valentino Sebastiani	It Loox Racing Car	20	25	30	33	22	22	Ret	36	Ret	10	13	20	10	12	10	Ret	12	4
27	(Austria) Walter Grubmüller	Jenzer Motorsport	10	21	19	23	15	16	Ret	10	Ret			25	21	23	15	13	15	3
28	(Italy) Stefano Turchetto	M&C Motorsport	19	24	13	34	20	Ret	Ret	9	27	22	19	16	Ret	19	14	20	24	2
29	(Italy) Alberto Costa	Euronova Racing	15	18	21	15	17	19	20	25	22	15	12	19	13	16	13	17	22	0
30	(United Kingdom) Alexander Russell	Cram Competition	21	27	20	27	23	25	Ret	15	28	19	15	15	11	21	17	18	18	0
31	(Italy) Cristian Corsini	CO2 Motorsport	17	Ret	Ret	19	14	21	Ret	11	15	16	Ret					26	16	0
32	(Italy) Davide Giampapa	RP Motorsport	Ret	Ret																0
33	(Italy) Filippo Ponti	Facondini Racing	12	11	28	17	16	18	Ret	Ret	Ret							24	21	0
34	(Italy) Giandomenico Sposito	It Loox Racing Car	Ret	Ret	17	26			21	30	14									0
35	(Italy) Laura Polidori	LP Motorsport Competition			DNS	31			Ret	19	25									0
36	(Belgium) Michael Herck	Junior Racing Team																		0
37	(Italy) Nicholas Risitano	Cek Team	28	26	Ret	25			Ret	34	21									0
38	(Italy) Niky Sebastiani	It Loox Racing Car	14	23	22	22	24	Ret	Ret	13	12	13	18	18	15	15	Ret	27	Ret	0
39	(Italy) Paolo Meloni	W&D Racing Team	18	22	23	28	25	24	18	28	19	18	17	13	14	17		19	25	0
	(Italy) Moreno Bruzzone	Alan Racing			31	29	26	23	17	31	18									0
	(Italy) Daniele Rosano	AP Motorsport							22	18	23									0
	(Switzerland) Jonathan Hirschi	Hirschi Racing Team							23	14	17									0
	(Italy) Ercole Mores	M&C Motorsport							25	16	24									0
	(Italy) Marco Mocci	Cek Team												14	12	14				0
	(Italy) Niccolò Valentini	Durango Formula												21	18	20	Ret	29	20	0
	(Italy) Nicolo Pastore	CO2 Motorsport																22	23	0
	(Italy) Marco Mapelli	Alan Racing																23	13	0

==== 2005 Formula Renault 2.0 Italia Winter Series ====
Point system : 20, 15, 12, 10, 8, 6, 4, 3, 2, 1 for 10th.

Pos	Driver	Team	(Italy) ADR November 20		(Italy) ADR November 26		Points
Pos	Driver	Team	1	2	3	4	Points
1	(Finland) Atte Mustonen	Korainen bros. Motorsport	1	3	3	Ret	44
2	(Belgium) Jonathan Thonon	CO2 Motorsport	2	1	7	7	43
3	(Belgium) Jérôme d'Ambrosio	Euronova Racing	Ret	Ret	1*	1	40
4	(Spain) Oliver Campos-Hull	Twin Cam Motorsport	3	2	6	6	39
5	(Italy) Marco Frezza	Jenzer Motorsport	6	8	2	8	27
6	(Venezuela) Johnny Cecotto Jr.	Kiwi	8	12	Ret	2	26
7	(Italy) Valentino Sebastiani	IT Loox Racing	5	5	4	Ret	18
8	(Italy) Niki Sebastiani	IT Loox Racing	4	7	18	Ret	14
9	(Romania) Mihai Marinescu	AP Motorsport	7	6	8	Ret	13
10	(Italy) Pasquale Di Sabatino	Tomcat Racing	11	24	19	3	12
11	(Austria) Walter Grubmüller	Jenzer Motorsport	Ret	4	12	9	12
12	(Mexico) Pablo Sánchez López	Alan Racing	10	10	Ret	4	12
13	(Italy) Stefano Turchetto	Toby Racing	16	14	5	Ret	8
14	(Italy) Mirko Bortolotti	Auinger	14	15	13	5	8
15	(Italy) Federico Muggia	BVM Minardi	9	9	9	Ret	6
16	(Finland) Joonas Mannerjärvi	MDR Motorsport	15	11	10	13	1
	(Italy) Nicolò Pastore	CO2 Motorsport	12	19	16	Ret	0
	(Italy) Andrea Caldarelli	RP Motorsport	13	16	11	11	0
	(Italy) Niccolò Valentini	Team Durango	17	18	17	Ret	0
	(Italy) Alberto Costa	Euronova Racing	18	13			0
	(Finland) Mikael Forsten	RP Motorsport	19	22	15	16	0
	(United Kingdom) Oliver Oakes	Euronova Racing	20	20	20	12	0
	(Italy) Pietro Gandolfi	AP Motorsport	21	23	21	Ret	0
	(Italy) Marco Visconti	Toby Racing	22	21	14	14	0
	German	Twin Cam Motorsport	Ret	17			0
	(Italy) Edoardo Mortara	Prema Powerteam			Ret	10	0
	(Netherlands) Danny Bleek	RP Motorsport			Ret	15	0

=== 2005 Formula Renault 2.0 Netherlands season ===
- Point system: 20, 17, 15, 13, 11, 10, 9, 8, 7, 6, 5, 4, 3, 2, 1 for 15th. plus 1 point for pole position and 1 point for fastest lap in each race.

The following table is incomplete and show only the points results from each drivers.

Pos	Driver	Team	(Netherlands) ZAN March 28	(Belgium) SPA April 17	(Netherlands) ZAN May 16		(Netherlands) ZAN June 11–12		(Netherlands) ASS August 7		(Sweden) MAN September 17–18		(Netherlands) ZAN October 16		Points
Pos	Driver	Team	1	2	3	4	5	6	7	8	9	10	11	12	Points
1	(Netherlands) Renger van der Zande	Van Amersfoort Racing	3	7	4	3	5	1	2*	1*	2	2*	1*	1*	203
2	(Netherlands) Junior Strous	Mr Glow Motorsport	1*	Ret	1*	1*	1				1*	1	4	6	152
3	(South Korea) Récardo Bruins Choi	Van Amersfoort Racing	7	6	11	8	Ret*	3	3	3	4	3	5	3	133
4	(Netherlands) Bas Lammers	MP Motorsport	8	4	14	5	4	6	1	2	3	9	3	Ret	132
5	(Netherlands) Mervyn Kool	Equipe Verschuur	9	8		15	12	14	5	5	6	4	8	4	88
6	(Netherlands) Ricardo van der Ende	Equipe Verschuur	5	3	3	2			10	4			6	Ret	87
7	(Netherlands) Carlo van Dam	SG Formula			13	10	2	4*					2	2	74
8	(Netherlands) Helmert Jan van der Slik	van der Slik Sportsupport	2	Ret	15	14		8	4	6			9	Ret	58
9	(Netherlands) Ron Marchal	Marchal Racing	Ret	13			15		7	9	5	6	10	8	55
10	(Belgium) Pieter Belmans	AR Motorsport	4	1	10	11	8								53
11	(Netherlands) Dominick Muermans	Van Amersfoort Racing	11	Ret			13		11	10	7	5	11	11	49
12	(Republic of Ireland) Patrick Hogan	Manor Motorsport			2	4	7	12							43
13	(Germany) Bernd Deuling			12					8	11	9	8	13	10	41
14	(Netherlands) Patrick Dirks		10	10							8	7	12	9	40
15	(France) Yann Clairay	SG Formula			6	13	3	7							37
16	(Netherlands) Xavier Maassen	JD Motorsport		2*				2							35
17	(Belgium) John Svensson	John Racing Team	Ret	9			14		9	7					25
18	(Netherlands) Jonatan Tonet	Equipe Verschuur	6	5	12										25
19	(United Kingdom) James Jakes	Team aka			7	9		10							22
20	(United Kingdom) Oliver Jarvis	Manor Motorsport			5	6									21
21	(Denmark) Steffen Møller												7	5	20
22	(Netherlands) Jürgen van den Goorbergh								6	8					18
23	(Venezuela) Rodolfo González	Manor Motorsport			9	12		9							18
24	(Sweden) Alexander Storckenfeldt	Team aka			8	7									17
25	(United Kingdom) Tom Kimber-Smith	Team JLR					6	11							15
26	(Netherlands) Yelmer Buurman	Fortec Motorsport						5							11
27	(Sweden) David Björk												Ret	7	9
28	(France) David Laisis	SG Formula					11	13							8
29	(Sweden) Stefan Söderberg						9								7
30	(Sweden) Max Nilsson	Max Racing					10								6
31	(Brazil) Alan Hellmeister			11											5
32	(Netherlands) Dan von Rosen												14	Ret	2
33	(United Kingdom) James Sutton	Fortec Motorsport						15							1

=== 2005 Formula Renault 2.0 Nordic Series season ===
- Point system : 20. 1 point for pole position.

Pos	Driver	Team	(Sweden) KNU May 21–22		(Denmark) JYL June 11–12		(Sweden) FAL July 10–11		(Denmark) DJU August 6–7		(Sweden) KAR August 20–21		(Denmark) JYL August 27–28		(Sweden) MAN September 17–18		Points
Pos	Driver	Team	1	2	3	4	5	6	7	8	9	10	11	12	13	14	Points
1	(Denmark) Jesper Wulff Laursen	Racing Denmark	3	Ret	1	1	4	1	1	1	1	1	1	2	7	5	216
2	(Denmark) Steffen Møller	Team Aarhus Racing	2	1	Ret	2	2	2	2	3	2	2	2	1	4	6	191
3	(Sweden) Micke Ohlsson	Team Formula Sport	1	2	3	Ret	1	4	3	2	4	3	3	5	6	4	164
4	(Sweden) David Björk	Team caWalli	4	4	2	3	3	3	5	4	3	4	4	3	17	8	136
5	(Ukraine) Kostyantyn Khorozov	Racing Denmark	6	5	5	5	Ret	5	6	6	7	6	Ret	6			65
6	(Denmark) Johnny Laursen	Racing Denmark	5	3	4	4			Ret	8	6	7	6	Ret	16	14	62
7	(Netherlands) Junior Strous	Mr Glow Motorsport													1	1	41
8	(Sweden) Johan Stolt	KEO Racing							4	7			5	4	8	9	37
9	(Netherlands) Renger van der Zande	Van Amersfoort Racing													2	2	31
10	(South Korea) Récardo Bruins Choi	Van Amersfoort Racing													5	3	20
11	(Denmark) Morten D. Jensen	KEO Racing							7	5			Ret	7			18
12	(Sweden) Christoffer Häggstam	Team Racing Sweden									5	5			10	10	18
13	(Netherlands) Bas Lammers	MP Motorsport													3	Ret	12
14	(Netherlands) Mervyn Kool	Equipe Verscuur													11	7	4
15	(Netherlands) Ron Marchal	Marchal Racing													9	12	2
	(Germany) Bernd Deuling	Emslund Racing													15	16	0
	(Netherlands) Patrick Dirks	PRD Autosport													14	13	0
	(Sweden) Daniel Ivarsson	KEO Racing													13	15	0
	(Netherlands) Dominick Muermans	Van Amersfoort Racing													12	11	0
	(Sweden) Sam Whan	Da Nina Racing													Ret	17	0

=== 2005 Formule Renault 2.0 Suisse season ===
- Point system: 25, 22, 20, 18, 16, 14, 12, 10, 8, 6, 5, 4, 3, 2, 1 for 15th. 1 point for fastest lap and 1 pont for pole position.

Pos	Driver	Team	(France) DIJ April 9–10	(Italy) VAR April 30 – May 1		(Belgium) SPA June 10–11	(France) MAG September 3–4		(Germany) HOC October 8–9		(Italy) MNZ October 22–23	Points
Pos	Driver	Team	1	2	3	4	5	6	7	8	9	Points
1	(Switzerland) Ralph Meichtry	Race Performance	5	1	2	1	4	3	4	4	4	181
2	(Switzerland) Nicolas Maulini		6	5	4	9	2	2	1	1	2	174
3	(Switzerland) Rahel Frey		3*	6*	Ret	Ret	3*	1*	3*	2*	1*	153
4	(Switzerland) Fabio Mena		2	2	1*	6	8	7	6	6	6	149
5	(Germany) Thomas Conrad		7	3	Ret	3*	6	6	2	3	5	139
6	(Switzerland) Jonathan Hirschi		4	11	3	4	1	?	5	10	3	129
7	(Switzerland) Julien Ducommun		1	4	Ret	5	5	8	?	7		97
8	(Switzerland) Patrick Cicchiello			14	5	2	7	4	12	5		91
9	(Switzerland) Louis Maulini		Ret	8	7	7	10	?	7	8	7	74
10	(Switzerland) Christopher Lammel		9	7	9	Ret	?	11	8	9	10	57
11	(Switzerland) Christophe Hurni		8			10	11	9			9	37
12	(Switzerland) Beat Wittwer		10	9	6	Ret	12	13	Ret	15		36
13	(Switzerland) Devis Schwägli						9	5			8	34
14	(Italy) Antonino Pellegrino		13	13	10	8			9	?		30
15	(Switzerland) Florian Lachat		14	10	8	11						23
16	(Switzerland) Kurt Böhlen		12	?	13	14	13	12	Ret	12	13	23
17	(Switzerland) Simon Borga		11			13					11	13
18	(Switzerland) Marianus Papiernik						15	?	10	11		12
19	(Switzerland) Thomas Amweg			?	12		?	15	13	?	12	12
20	(Switzerland) Marco Menotti			12	11		14	?				11
21	(Germany) Thorsten Steinhilber						?	10			14	8
22	(Switzerland) Andreas Burghold								11	?		5
23	(United Kingdom) Stephen Rees					12						4
24	(Switzerland) Thomas Keller								15	13		4
25	(Germany) Jörg Bernhard								Ret	14		2
26	(Germany) Franz Broch								14	?		2
27	(Switzerland) Jo Brunner						?	14				2
28	(Italy) Gianmarco Zanotti		15	15	?							2
29	(Switzerland) Christian Broillet	Gruyère Racing Team				15						1
30	(Switzerland) Nicolas Auderset	Gruyère Racing Team	18									0
31	(Switzerland) Dominique Vananty											0

- Only the finish position in points are mentioned in the table due to lack of sources.

=== 2005 Copa Corona Formula Renault 2000 de America season ===
- Point system : 30, 24, 20, 16, 12, 10, 8, 6, 4, 2 for 10th. Extra 2 points for Fastest lap and 2 points for Pole position.

The series reward also the best rookie (N).

The June 12 round in the Autódromo de Aguascalientes was cancelled.

Pos	Driver	Team (Sponsor)	(Mexico) MOR May 8	(Mexico) Fundidora Park Circuit May 21	(Mexico) PUE June 26	(Guatemala) GUA July 17	(Costa Rica) COS July 31	(Mexico) ZAC August 14	(Mexico) SLP September 4	(Mexico) MON October 2	(Mexico) GUA October 23	(Mexico) MEX November 6(*?)	(Mexico) MOR December 4(*?)	Points
Pos	Driver	Team (Sponsor)	1	2	3	4	5	6	7	8	9	10	11	Points
1	(Mexico) Germán Quiroga (N)	ÚNICO Competition	1	17	2	1	6	5	2	4	3	2	2	230
2	(Mexico) Oscar Hidalgo, Jr.	Hidalgo Racing (Renault Service E.)	7	5	3	10	4	2	4	3	6	7	1	202
3	(Mexico) Antonio Pérez	Corona	6	3	Ret	4*	1	Ret	7	5*	2	16	3	162
4	(Mexico) Carlos Mastretta	Dynamic Motorsport (Daewoo)	2	1*	1	Ret	18	10	Ret	12	9	1	4	156
5	(Mexico) Hugo Oliveras	FedEx Racing	DSQ	DSQ	4	7	2	3	1	9	1*	3	8	160
6	(Mexico) Arturo Hernández (N)	Dynamic Motorsport	5	4	Ret	9	5	Ret	15*	1	4	5	6	122
	(Mexico) Juan Pablo Garcia (N)	ÚNICO Competition	8	9	Ret	3	9	7	8	2	5	6	5	
	(Colombia) Mauricio Borrero (N)	Mundo Único(3–4), NEXTEL(5–11)			12	5	12	Ret	6	16	Ret	Ret		22
	(Mexico) Charlie Fonseca (N)	Kit Disexport					3*							20
	(Mexico) Daniel Méndez	NEXTEL Racing	3	Ret	Ret									20
	(Guatemala) Diego Cuestas (N)	Movistar	12	10		17	7	12	14	13	11	Ret	14	12
	(Mexico) Iván Ramos	FedEx Racing(1), Cafe Punta del Cielo(2–11)	4*	7	8	18	Ret	9	10	8	10	Ret	Ret	
	(Mexico) Daniel Morales	Hidalgo Racing (Renault Service E.)	11	6	5	6	Ret							
	(Mexico) Diego Fernández	R/E Racing (Iusacell)	Ret	2	13*	2	10	4	5	15	8	4		
	(Mexico) Pablo Cervantes	R/E Racing (Iusacell)	Ret	8	6	Ret	11	16	9	Ret	12	8	Ret	
	(Mexico) Homero Richards	NEXTEL Racing	DSQ	DSQ		Ret	Ret	1*	3	7	16		Ret	
	(Mexico) Javier Ramos	Dynamic Motorsport		12	15	13	8	8	11	Ret	7	Ret	7	
	(Mexico) José A. Ramos	ÚNICO Competition	DNS	14	14	8	Ret	6	Ret					16
	(Mexico) Israel Jaitovich	?			7		17	11	17	Ret	13		9	10
	(Mexico) Mauricio Godinez	Renault Service E.						Ret		6				10
21	(Mexico) Tomás Contreras (N)	FedEx Racing (Furor)	10	15	9	Ret	14	14	Ret	11		12		6
22	(Mexico) Eduardo Ramírez (N)	Corona	9	13	Ret	14								4
23	(Mexico) Jorge Alarcón (N)	Dynamic Motorsport (Arrenda Fácil)	Ret	11	10	11	13	Ret	12	10	15	17	16	4
24	(Mexico) Arturo González (N)	NEXTEL										9		4
25	(Mexico) Javier Razo (N)	FedEx Racing			Ret	15	16	13	16	Ret	Ret	10	11	2
26	(Mexico) Patrick Goeters	Renault Service E.									Ret		10	2
	(Mexico) Jorge Arai	Frightliner						15	Ret	14	14	Ret	15	0
	(Mexico) Carlos Arellano	Lecluv										13	12	0
	(Mexico) Erick Martinez	Renault Service E.										11		0
	(Costa Rica) Juan I. Sansó	Team Costa Rica				12	Ret							0
	(Costa Rica) André Solano	Team Costa Rica				16	15							0
	(Mexico) Oscar Hidalgo, Sr.	Renault Service E.								13				0
	(Mexico) Felipe Merjech	ÚNICO											13	0
	(Mexico) Carlos Barajas	?										14		0
35	(Mexico) Ruben Vila	Aceros Vila										15		0
36	(Mexico) Rigoberto Ivarra	FedEx Racing		16				DNS						0
37	(Mexico) Lorenzo Mariscal	SportCar.com											17	0
38	(Mexico) Claus Shinkel, Jr.	?										Ret		0

- (N) = Rookie championship

=== 2005 Formula Renault 2.0 Brazil season ===
- Point system : 30, 24, 20, 16, 12, 10, 8, 6, 4, 2 for 10th. 1 point for Pole position and 1 point for Fastest lap.

Pos	Driver	Team	(Brazil) CUR March 13	(Brazil) CMG April 10	(Brazil) BRA May 6–7		(Brazil) SAN June 19	(Brazil) RIO ?		(Brazil) VIT ?	(Brazil) SAO ?	(Brazil) TAR ?		(Brazil) SAL ?	(Brazil) SAO ?		Points
Pos	Driver	Team	1	2	3	4	5	6	7	8	9	10	11	12	13	14	Points
1	(Brazil) Nelson Merlo	Bassani Racing	10*	6*	5	1	1	1	2	6	2	2	2	1*	1	1	319
2	(Brazil) Felipe Lapenna	Full Time Sports	1	4	2	2	5*	3	3		1		5	10	3		211
3	(Brazil) Ana Beatriz Figueiredo	Cesário F.Renault	Ret	1	4	8	3	6	6	1	3	1		4	6	9	209
4	(Brazil) Paulo Salustiano	M4T Motorsport	3	2	6	4	9	4		4	4	3	1	2	5		209
5	(Brazil) Marcos Gomes	Piquet Sports	12	8	1*	3*	Ret	2	1		6	4	3				163
6	(Brazil) Douglas Soares	PropCar Racing		3	3	7	2	7		5	9	6			2	2	155
7	(Brazil) André Sousa	Full Time Sports	2	5	7	5	8	5	5	2		7	4		9		138
8	(Brazil) William Starostik	Gramacho Racing, M4T Motorsport	4	9	8	9	13	8	8			9	7	3	7	7	90
9	(Brazil) Fernando Galera	Bassani Racing	8	7	9	Ret	7		4		7	5	8		10	10	72
10	(Brazil) Luiz Razia	Dragão Motorsport	13	11	15	6	4			7		8	6		8	5	68
11	(Brazil) Guga Campedelli	PropCar Racing	5	Ret	13	10	10	9	10	8			10	7		6	50
12	(Brazil) Diego Nunes	Gramacho Racing								3	5			5			44
13	(Brazil) Fábio Beretta Rossi, Jr.	Dragão Motorsport	9	Ret	10	Ret	12		7		10			8		3	44
14	(Brazil) Enzo Morrone	Piquet Sports, M4T Motorsport	7													4	24
15	(Brazil) Alberto Valério	Cesário F.Renault					6				8			9			22
16	(Brazil) Cairo Campos	Gramacho Racing			14	13	Ret								4		16
17	(Brazil) Diego Freitas	Piquet Sports												6			11
18	(Brazil) Luis de Conto	De Conto-Kemba Racing	6	Ret	11	11	11										10
19	(Brazil) Anderson Faria	Piquet Sports, Cesário F.Renault						10	9	10							8
20	(Brazil) Leonardo de Souza	De Conto-Kemba Racing	Ret	10	12	12	Ret			9		10					8
21	(Brazil) Carlos Henrique Rosin	Gramacho Racing, Kemba Racing		11												8	6
22	(Brazil) Ramon Matias	Cesário F.Renault										9					4
nc	(Brazil) Eduardo Azevedo	Cesário F.Renault															0
nc	(Brazil) Rodrigo Barbosa	Cesário F.Renault															0
nc	(Brazil) Renato Jader David	Gramacho Racing		Ret	Ret	14											0
nc	(Brazil) Vinicius Quadros	Gramacho Racing															0

=== 2005 Formula TR 2000 Pro Series season ===
The Formula TR 20000 Pro Series is held with the Formula TR 1600 Pro Series. The same point system is used.

Pos	Driver	Team	Points
1	(United States) Seth Ingham	Constant Radius	491
2	(United States) Derek Sabol		474
3	(United States) John Knudsen	Knudsen Racing	414
4	(United States) Bret MacDonald	CT Motorsport	377
5	(United States) Dustin Welch		308
6	(South Korea) Ken Lee		144
7	(Canada) Brett van Blankers		83
8	(United States) Paul Mashouf		76
9	(United States) Chris Tryon		46

=== 2005 Asian Formula Renault Challenge season ===
- Point system : 30, 24, 20, 17, 15, 13, 11, 9, 7, 5, 4, 3, 2, 1 for 14th. No points for fastest lap or pole position. Late drivers don't receive any points for the final standing. The team point attribution is different from the driver point system : 10, 8, 6, 5, 4, 3, 2, 1.
- Races : 2 races by rounds.

Pos	Driver	Team	(China) Shanghai		(China) Zhuhai		(Malaysia) Sepang		(China) Zhuhai		(China) Shanghai		(China) Beijing		Macau	Points (2)	Points (C)
Pos	Driver	Team	1	2	3	4	5	6	7	8	9	10	11	12	13	Points (2)	Points (C)
1	(Taiwan) Hanss Lin	Champ Motorsports	1	1	1	1*	4	Ret	1*	1	1	1	1*	1*	Ret	317	240
2	(China) Tengyi Jiang	Shangsai FRD Team	4	Ret	2	4	2*	1	3	3						155	113
3	(Japan) Yoshihisa Namekata	Person's Racing Team FRD+Winds	7	6	Ret	6					4	2	4	3	4	145	80
4	(Hong Kong) Jim Ka To	Shangsai FRD Team							2	2*	2	4	2	2	Ret	140	0
5	(Hong Kong) Takuya Nishitani	Person's Racing Team FRD+Winds	13	4	12	Ret	23	7	4	4	5	17	3	4	15	135	89
6	(Hong Kong) Henry Lee	Dyna Ten Motorsports	Ret	26	3	Ret	5	2	6	7	6	Ret	6	Ret	5	135	65
7	(Hong Kong) David Louie	Dyna Ten Motorsports	6	5	4	2			10	10	8	6	12	11	12	135	0
8	(China) Jin Zhang	Asia Racing Team			13	3	11	5	5	9	13	8	7	5		110	0
9	(Hong Kong) Michael Ting	Asia Racing Team	9	9			10	Ret	8	6	3	13	5	Ret		86	85
10	(Japan) Ryohei Tanaka	Shangsai FRD Team	2	2*	6	Ret	3	Ret								81	63
11	(Australia) Jeffrey Lee	Champ Motorsports Ltd	12	17	10	5	18	10	Ret	13	7	7	11	7	21	80	74
12	(Netherlands) Francis Tjia	Shangsai FRD Team	15	25	8	Ret	6	9	11	11	25	10			14	67	50
13	(Japan) Takashi Shibuya	Team KVR	5	3			7	Ret								65	35
14	(Canada) Wayne Shen	Shangsai FRD Team	Ret	11	9	Ret	8	8	Ret	16	11	Ret	8	6		60	29
15	(Japan) Ryo Orime	Asia Racing Team					1	3*								50	
16	(China) Qinghua Ma	Asia Racing Team(7–8)	24	23	5	Ret			9	8						35	39
17	(Canada) Samson Chan	Team Ghiasports	18	16			13	12	12	13	14	12	10	9	Ret	34	35
18	(Hong Kong) Michael Choi	Dyna Ten Motorsports							Ret	18	15	11			9	29	
19	(Hong Kong) Stephen Chau	Dyna Ten Motorsports	11	8							16	9				26	0
20	(Hong Kong) Kin Pong Lo	Team Ghiasports	Ret	18			16	11			18	14	14	10	19	23	16
21	(France) Claude Magemont	Dyna Ten Motorsports	8	7												22	0
22	(Taiwan) Max Chen	Asia Racing Team	23	14			9	6								22	0
23	(Japan) Tomokazu Kasae	Shangsai FRD Team							18	20	12	Ret	9	8		21	
24	(Hong Kong) Albert Yue	Team Ghiasports	17	13			15	13	16	14	Ret	Ret	15	13	20	17	15
25	(Hong Kong) Andrew Lo	Super Car Club Hong Kong	10	10			12	Ret								15	0
26	(Canada) John Shen	Shangsai FRD Team			17	9	24	19	21	23	22	20	13	12	23	15	0
27	(Canada) Ross Lau	Asia Racing Team	21	22	15	8	19	17	14	Ret	23	21				14	27
28	(Hong Kong) Kenneth Lau	Dyna Ten Motorsports							25	17	Ret	15			18	13	
29	(Hong Kong) Tit Lung Siu	Super Car Club Hong Kong	Ret	Ret	15	7	17	18	20	24	24	Ret				12	0
30	(Canada) Christian Chia	Shangsai FRD Team	16	19			20	15	15	15	Ret	16			22	8	15
31	(Taiwan) Jimmy Lin	Dyna Ten Motorsports			14	Ret										3	0
32	(Hong Kong) Paul Yao	Super Car Club Hong Kong	23	21			22	16			22	19			24	2	0
33	(Hong Kong) Yuk Lung Siu	Super Car Club Hong Kong	20	20			17	14	17	19	19	18				1	0
34	(Hong Kong) Hau Woon Yung	Shangsai FRD Team							22	22	20	Ret	16	14		1	
35	(Japan) Takanori Araki	Team KVR	Ret	24			14	4								1	0
36	(Japan) Keigo Tsunamoto	Persons Racing Team							24	Ret						0	
37	(Chinese Taipei) Yi Hung Liu	Asia Racing Team							19	Ret						0	
38	(Hong Kong) Tom Kim	Dyna Ten Motorsports							23	21						0	
39	(Hong Kong) Chi Ho Leung	Huawin Racing Team	19	Ret												0	0
40	(Macau) Kam San Lam	Huawin Racing Team			11	Ret			13	25	17	Ret			Ret	0	15
41	(China) Yang Liu	Huawin Racing Team	3	12					7	5	10	3				0	94
42	(Hong Kong) Siu Kuen Chan	Huawin Racing Team			7*	Ret										0	13
43	(Israel) Eitan Zidkilov	Dyna Ten Motorsports	Ret	15											Ret	0	5
44	(Australia) Mark Williamson	Shangsai FRD Team									9	5				0	31
45	(Australia) Aaron Caratti	Champ Motorsport													8	0	
46	(France) Yann Clairay	Dyna Ten Motorsports Ltd													13	0	
47	(Philippines) Eduardo Juan Pena	Champ Motorsport													10	0	
48	(Hong Kong) Sam Chan Tak Man	Ghiasports Racing Team													Ret	0	
49	(Japan) Hiroyuki Matsumura	Asia Racing Team													1*	0	
50	(Japan) Motohiko Isozaki	Asia Racing Team													16	0	
51	(Japan) Yuhi Sekiguchi	Asia Racing Team													6	0	
52	(Hong Kong) Kazuya Oshima	Asia Racing Team													2	0	
53	(Philippines) Tyson Sy	Asia Racing Team													11	0	
54	(Japan) Tsubasa Abe	Shangsai FRD Team													Ret	0	
55	(Italy) Luca Persiani	Shangsai FRD Team													7	0	
56	(Japan) Koudai Tsukakoshi	Shangsai FRD Team													3	0	
57	(France) David Laisis	Dyna Ten Motorsports Ltd													17	0	

- (1) = Rounds a and b doesn't award points.
- (2) = Final standing include only the best 10 results.
- (C) = China Formula Renault Challenge category.

Pos	Team	Points	Points (C)
1	Shangsai FRD Team	118	71
2	Champ Motorsports	97	70
3	Asia Racing Team	68	39
4	Person's Racing Team FRD +Winds	59	33
5	Dyna Ten Motorsports	53	5
6	Team Ghiasports	34	20
7	Super Car Club Hong Kong	31	
8	Team KVR	21	11
9	Team Richard Mille	6	
10	Huawin Racing Team	0	39

== Formula Renault 1.6L ==
=== 2005 Championnat de France Formule Campus Renault Elf La Filière FFSA season ===
- Point system : ?

All drivers use the La Fillière car. The championship is held on various French circuits:

1–2. Circuit Paul Armagnac (March 26–27)
3–4. ? ()
5–6. Circuit de Pau (May 7–8)
7–8. Dijon-Prenois (May 28–29)
9–10. Circuit du Val de Vienne (June 25–26)
11–12. Circuit Bugatti du Mans (July 9–10)
13–14. Circuit Bugatti du Mans (September 24–25)

Pos	Driver	Points
1	(France) Jean Karl Vernay	205
2	(France) Mathieu Arzeno	159
3	(France) Jean-Philippe Bournot	140
4	(France) Pierre Combot	134
5	(France) Kévin van Heek	106
6	(France) Alexis Passelaigues	105
7	(France) Sébastien Chardonnet	87
8	(France) Alexandre Marsoin	62
9	(France) Pierre-Brice Mena	48
10	(Mexico) Alfonso Toledano Jr.	24
11	(France) Aubin Thibault	22
12	(France) Michaël Petit	19
13	(France) ?	12
14	(France) Benoit Guillemard	7
15	(France) Florent Couture	6
16	(Switzerland) Maxime Rochat	3
17	(France) Eric Bergerot	2
18	(France) Loïc Simonelli	2
19	(France) Nicolas Metaire	1
nc	(France) Charles-Emmanuel Grouberman	0
nc	(Malaysia) Nik Iruwan	0
nc	(United Kingdom) Adam Perkins	0
nc	(France) Guilhem Verdier	0
...	...	...

=== 2005 Formula Junior 1.6 Italia powered by Renault season ===
The season was held on 6 races in Italia.

- Point system : 20, 17, 15, 13, 11, 10, 9, 8, 7, 6, 5, 4, 3, 2, 1 for 15th. Extra 1 point for Fastest lap and 2 points for Pole position.

Pos	Driver	Team	Points
1	(Italy) Pasquale Di Sabatino	Tomcat Racing	268
2	(Romania) Mihai Marinescu	AP Motorsport	200
3	(Spain) Jaime Alguersuari	Tomcat Racing	160
4	(Italy) Fabrizio Crestani	PSR Motorsport	141
5	(Finland) Joonas Mannerjarvi	MRD Motorsport	133
6	(Italy) Andrea Pellizzato	BVM Minardi	126
7	(Italy) Valerio Prandi	Tomcat Racing	122
8	(Italy) Marco Mapelli	Emmegi Promotion	118
9	(Italy) Davide Ruzzon	AP Motorsport	80
10	(Italy) Gianmarco Voltan	Dynamic Engineering	62
11	(Italy) Nicholas Comito Viola	Kiwi Esp	54
12	(Germany) Johnny Cecotto Jr.		40
13	(Italy) Tobias Tauber	Tomcat Racing	22
14	(Italy) Mirko Bortolotti	AP Motorsport	20
15	(Slovenia) David Rotar	Kiwi Esp	10
16	Matthias Plank	AP Motorsport	10
17	(Italy) Antonio Viggiani	AP Motorsport	8
18	(Austria) Bianca Steiner	Szasz Motorsport	8
19	(Italy) Alberto Bassi	M&C Motorsport	6
20	(Italy) Alberto Cola	PSR Motorsport	6
21	(Italy) Alessandro Cappato	Viola Racing	4
22	(Italy) Federico Porri		2
23	(Italy) Giorgio Ferri	Keks Motorsport	2
24	(Italy) Gregorio Baracchi	Tomcat Racing	2
25	(Italy) Nicola Bocchi	BVM Minardi	2
26	(Italy) Damiano Manni	PSR Motorsport	0
27	(Italy) Gregorio Baracchi	Tomcat Racing	0
28	(Finland) Marko Keranen	MRD Motorsport	0
29	(Venezuela) René Orioli	Dynamic Engineering	0

==== 2005 Formula Junior 1600 Italy Winter Series ====
- Point system : 20, 17, 15, 13, 11, 10, 9, 8, 7, 6, 5, 4, 3, 2, 1 for 15th. Extra 1 point for Fastest lap and 2 points for Pole position.

Pos	Driver	Team	Points
1	(Italy) Davide Ruzzon	AP Motorsport	55
2	(Italy) Federico Rossi	Tomcat Racing	48
3	(Finland) Joonas Mannerjärvi	MRD Motorsport	47
4	(Italy) Luca Fiorenti	Kiwi Esp	37
5	(Italy) Alberto Bassi	Dynamic Engineering	29
6	(Spain) Daniel Campos-Hull	Tomcat Racing	26
7	(Italy) Massimiliano Colombo	AP Motorsport	15
8	(Austria) Bianca Steiner	Szasz Motorsport	12
9	(Netherlands) Frank Suntjens	Speed Lover	11
10	(Italy) Nicolas Comito Viola	Kiwi Esp	10
11	(Hungary) Mirco Merlin	BVM Minardi	10
12	(Italy) Federico Porri	Keks Motorsport	10
13	(Italy) Federico Leo	Tomcat Racing	9
14	(Italy) Nino Moriggia	AP Motorsport	5
15	(Italy) Paolo Coppi	AP Motorsport	1
...	...	...	...

=== 2005 Formula Renault 1.6 Belgium season ===
- Point system : ?

Pos	Driver	Team	Points
1	(Belgium) Pierre Sevrin	Delahaye Racing Team	188
2	(Finland) Marko Keränen		149
3	(Romania) Mihai Marinescu	District Racing	142
4	(Finland) Joonas Mannerjärvi		117
5	(France) Benjamin Rouget		102
6	(Netherlands) David Hauser		97
7	(Belgium) Julien Schroyen	Marc Goossens Motorsport	95
8	(United Kingdom) Yonny Weeden		87
9	(Belgium) Eddy Roosens		65
10	(Belgium) Alexandre Marissal		65
11	(Belgium) Yves van Nijen		63
12	(Belgium) Jonathan Thonon	Speedlover	60
13	(Belgium) Maurizio Pignato		56
14	(Belgium) Jonathan van der Zijl		47
15	(Belgium) Koen Deberdt		44
16	(Belgium) Maxime Dumarey		42
17	(Netherlands) Frank Suntjens		34
...	...	...	...

=== 2005 Formula Renault 1.6 Argentina season ===
- Point system : 20, 15, 12, 10, 8, 6, 4, 3, 2, 1 for 10th. 1 extra point for Pole position. 1 point for start in each race.

Pos	Driver	Team	Points
1	(Argentina) Lucas Benamo		187
2	(Argentina) Juan Marcos Angelini		120
3	(Argentina) Mariano Ponce de León		107
4	(Argentina) Mariano Werner		101
5	(Argentina) Facundo Crovo		96
6	(Argentina) Damián Cassino		80
7	(Uruguay) Ignacio Moreira		61
8	(Uruguay) José Pedro Passadore		59
9	(Argentina) Kevin Icardi		52
10	(Argentina) Martín Serrano		52
11	(Argentina) Jonathan Vazquez		49
12	(Argentina) Néstor Girolami		46
13	(Argentina) Ezequiel Tudesco		41
14	(Argentina) Roberto Luna		36
15	(Argentina) Guido Falaschi		35
16	(Argentina) Rafael Morgenstern		34
17	(Argentina) José Luis Di Palma		34
18	(Uruguay) Mauricio Lambiris		25
19	(Argentina) Matías Muñoz Marchesi		24
20	(Argentina) Carlos Host		24
21	(Argentina) Nicolas Branca		23
22	(Argentina) Jorge Humbert		23
23	(Argentina) Pablo Fioquetta		22
24	(Argentina) Ignacio Vivian		21
25	(Argentina) Patricio Signorile		21
26	(Argentina) Matias Funes		19
27	(Argentina) Carlos Sirera		18
28	(Argentina) Maximiliano Baumgartner		18
29	(Argentina) Santiago Ventana		18
30	(Argentina) Juan Manuel Piccioni		18
31	(Argentina) Waldemar Flaumer		17
32	(Argentina) Néstor Andres Barovero		17
33	(Argentina) Bernardo Llaver		17
34	(Argentina) Ivan Ciccarelli		16
35	(Argentina) Benjamin Blachowicz		16
36	(Argentina) Gabriel Satorra		15
37	(Argentina) Francisco Viel Bugliotti		14
38	(Argentina) Pablo Sanchez		13
39	(Argentina) Pablo Maliza		12
40	(Argentina) Gonzalo Sanchez		12
41	(Argentina) Andrés Gigena		11
42	(Argentina) Daniel Golini		9
43	(Argentina) Alejandro González		9
44	(Argentina) Adrian Bacaloni		9
45	(Argentina) Juan Jose Conde		9
46	(Argentina) Santiago Mangoni		9
47	(Argentina) Sebastian Chincarini		9
48	(Argentina) Martín Antonio Rodriguez		9
49	(Brazil) Ruben Carrapatoso		8
50	(Argentina) Agustin Klappenbach		8
51	(Argentina) Alejandro Quintana		6
52	(Argentina) Sebastian Sgroppo		6
53	(Brazil) Sara Sanchez		5
54	(Uruguay) Pablo Jorge Silva		5
55	(Argentina) Martín Aimar		5
56	(Argentina) Alan Ortuondo		5
57	(Argentina) Fernando Astrella		4
58	(Argentina) Mauro Giallombardo		4
59	(Argentina) Ezequiel Bosio		3
60	(Argentina) Juan Cruz Aimar		3
61	(Argentina) Diego Leanez		3
62	(Brazil) Daniel Lancaster		3
63	(Argentina) Luis Cassalis		3
64	(Argentina) Pablo Merayo		2
66	(Puerto Rico) Wilmer Valentin, Jr.		2
67	(Argentina) Tomas Abdala		2
68	(Argentina) Aldo Hugo Tedeschi		2
69	(Chile) José Luis Riffo		1
70	(Argentina) Agustín Miotti		1
71	(Argentina) Jose Theiler		1
72	(Argentina) Juniors Galid		1
73	(Argentina) Andrés Humbert		1
74	(Argentina) Ricardo Felipe		1

=== 2005 Copa Corona Fórmula Renault Jr. 1600 season ===
The Copa Corona Formula 1600 Junior is held with the Formula Renault 2000 de America on the same races. The same point system is used.

- Point system : 30, 24, 20, 16, 12, 10, 8, 6, 4, 2 for 10th. Extra 2 points for Fastest lap and 2 points for Pole position.

Pos	Driver	Team	Points
1	(Mexico) Picho Toledano	NEXTEL	208
1	(Colombia) Juan Jacobo	Laguna Viva	134
3	(Colombia) Carlos Gaitán	Pole Mechanic	130
4	(Colombia) Juliana González	NEXTEL-UNICO	124
5	(Mexico) Estefanía Reyes	Hospital Obregón	92
6	(Mexico) Alejandro Sobrado	Trackmagic	92
7	(Colombia) Oscar Juan Martínez	MRT	?
8	(Canada) David Wilkings	Pentamax	16
9	(Colombia) Manuel Acosta	Kosiuco	12
10	(Mexico) David Farías	Philips	10
nc	(Mexico) Enrique Baca	Monterrey	–

=== 2005 Formula TR 1600 Pro Series season ===
The Formula TR 1600 Pro Series is held with the Formula TR 2000 Pro Series. The same point system is used.

Pos	Driver	Team	Points
1	(United States) Carl Skerlong		530
2	(Canada) Adam Davis	Welch Racing	517
3	(United States) Auston Harris		406
4	(United States) Philip Metzger		373
...	...	...	...

== Other Formulas powered by Renault championships ==
=== 2005 GP2 Series season ===
The GP2 Series are powered by 4 liters, V8 Renault engine and Bridgestone tyres with a Dallara chassis.

Colour	Result
Gold	Winner
Silver	2nd place
Bronze	3rd place
Green	Finished, in points
Green	Retired, in points
Blue	Finished, no points
Purple	Did not finish (Ret)
Purple	Not classified (NC)
Red	Did not qualify (DNQ)
Black	Disqualified (DSQ)
White	Did not start (DNS)
White	Withdrew (WD)
Blank	Did not participate
Blank	Injured (INJ)
Blank	Excluded (EX)
**Bold**	Pole position
*	Fastest lap
spr	Sprint Race
fea	Feature Race
