= Formula Renault =

Single-Seater Racing Championship

Formula Renault are classes of formula racing popular in Europe and elsewhere. Regarded as an entry-level series to motor racing, it was founded in 1971, and was a respected series where drivers can learn advanced racecraft before moving on to higher formulas.

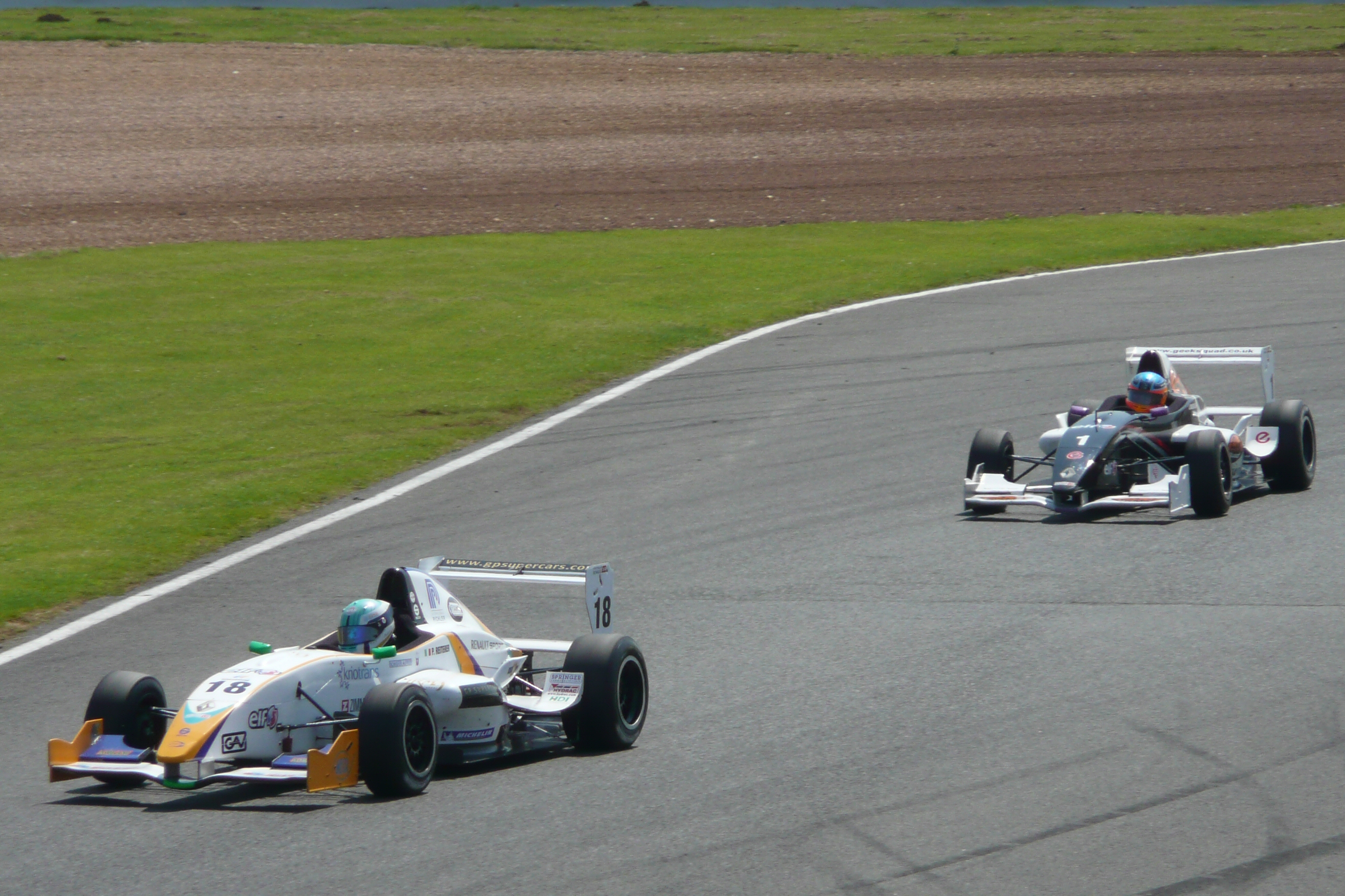
Formula Renault 2.0 race at Silverstone in 2008

Renault now backs the French F4 Championship and Formula Regional European Championship. The World Series by Renault once included Formula Renault 3.5 before becoming World Series Formula V8 3.5 in 2016, then folding in 2017.

== Formula Renault 3.5L ==
The most senior "Formula Renault" was the Formula Renault V6 Eurocup started by Renault to run as part of Eurosport's Super Racing Weekends (ETCC and FIA GT Championship). Only two seasons were run between 2003 and 2004 before Renault left Super Racing Weekends and merged the series with the similar World Series by Nissan to create the Formula Renault 3.5 Series as part of the World Series by Renault in 2005. In 2016 the series became the World Series Formula V8 3.5, which folded in 2017.

Formula V6 Asia started in 2006 in Asia and ran at Asian Festival of Speed Weekends (Touring Car, Formula BMW and Porsche Carrera Cup Asia).

The old Eurocup and current Asian formulas use Tatuus chassis, while the World Series uses Dallara cars. Michelin is the tyre supplier.

=== The cars ===
- Engine: Renault Type V4Y RS, 60° V6, 3498 cc, 425-500 hp - since 2012 Zytek ZRS03 V8, 3396 cc, 530 hp
- Chassis: Tatuus (Eurocup and Asia) or Dallara T02/T05/T08/T12 (World Series) Carbon-fibre Monocoque, carbon and fibreglass bodywork
- Width: 1850 mm (72.8") maximum
- Wheelbase: 3000–3125 mm
- Track: 1579 mm (front) and 1536 mm (rear)
- Weight: 616 kg
- Fuel: 110 litres
- Suspension front and rear with torsion bar, push-rod, twin struts
- Telemetry, and steering wheel
- Sequential gearbox, six gears
- Wheels: Single piece magnesium with central nut, 10 x 13 (front) and 13 x 13 (rear)
- Tyres: Michelin dry and rain, 24 x 57 x 13 (front) and 31 x 60 x 13 (rear)

=== Championships ===
Formula Renault 3.5L official championships
Zone/Country	Last official series name	Active years	Tyres	Complementary information
Europe	World Series by Nissan	1998–2004	M	Replaced by Formula Renault 3.5 Series.
Europe	Formula Renault V6 Eurocup	2003–2004	M	Replaced by Formula Renault 3.5 Series.
Europe	Formula Renault 3.5 Series (part of World Series by Renault)	2005-2017	M	
(China) (Malaysia) Asia	Formula V6 Asia	2006–2009	M	

A Pan Am Formula Renault V6 series was planned to take place in 2005 but it never occurred.

== Formula Renault 2.0 ==
Formula Renault 2.0 descended from Formula France created in 1968. Its predecessors used 1.3L (1968–1971), 1.6L (1972–1981), 1.6L turbo (1982–1988) and later 1,721 cc (1989–1994), then 2l 8V (1995–1999) engines in single-seater chassis. The series evolved in 2000 into a 2L 16V series using one-make cars from Italian manufacturer Tatuus. The series was introduced into the UK in 1989 and even after the 1721 cc cars had been replaced at the top level a club-level series for them continued in parallel with the more ambitious 2.0 series. This is seen as one of the key steps in a driver's career before Formula Three.

The most notable recent graduate of the formula is Kimi Räikkönen, who moved straight into Formula One after winning the British Formula Renault championship.

=== The cars ===
==== 1995–1999 ====
The Formula Renault 95 used multiple chassis, production 2.0-litre 8V 165 hp engines and Hewland five-speed manual gearboxes. Manufacturers were able to build cars around spec components such as the engine, bellhousing, gearbox, brakes, wheels and ECU. Chassis were steel space frame with fibreglass bodies. Manufacturers included Mygale, Martini, Swift, Tatuus, and Ermolli. The car was last used in 1999.

==== 2000–2009 ====
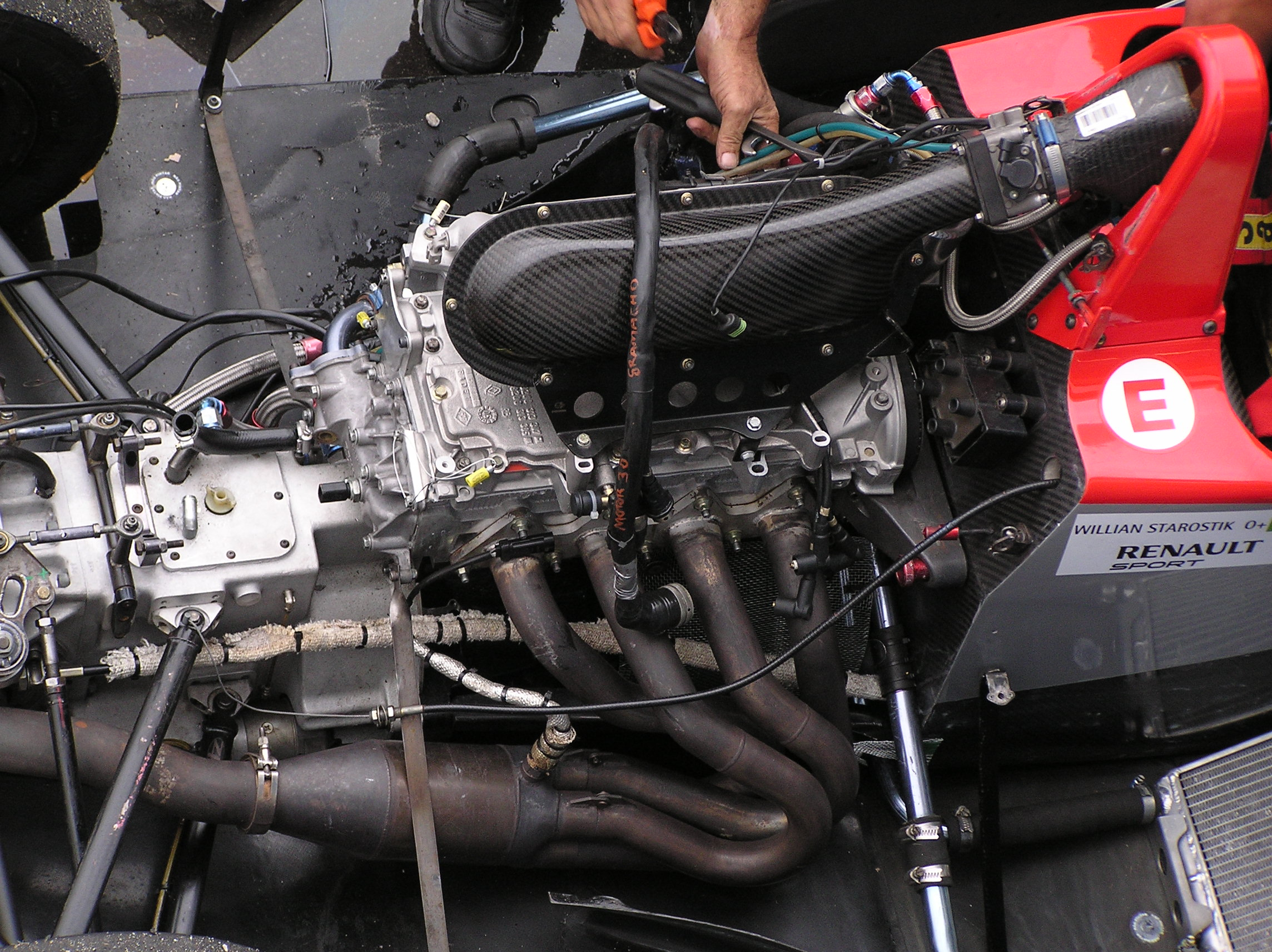
"Renault Sport type F4R FRS" engine

The Formula Renault 2000 had a Tatuus-made chassis running 2.0 L Renault Clio engines attached to a Sadev gearbox. The engine originally had a maximum output of 185 hp, and was upgraded to 210 hp in 2006. They are capable of accelerating from 0 to 100 km/h (0-62 mph) in 4.85 seconds and braking from 200 km/h (124 mph) to a stop in 4.60 seconds. The Tatuus Formula Renault car is the most successful single seater ever, with 10 years of service and nearly 1000 sold. The car has produced many current Formula One stars, with 11 of the 25 drivers in the 2009 Formula One season using the car in the infancy of their careers.

For the 2010 season, a new car developed by Barazi-Epsilon, will be used in most major championships, with the old car still being used in minor championships such as Formula Renault BARC in the UK.

===== Dimensions and weight =====
Wheel Base: 2,645 mm
Front Track: 1,434 mm
Rear Track: 1,318 mm
Minimum Weight: 490 kg without driver / 565 kg with driver

===== Chassis =====
The chassis is a carbon fiber cell designed and developed by Tatuus and Renault Sport. It also incorporates a FIA-approved roll hoop and lateral driver's head protection. This was introduced in 2000 and updated with new bodywork in 2004 and 2007. Both the chassis and engine are of an FIA-approved "impact break-away" design.

===== Cockpit =====
XAP Multi-Changeable Dashboard Display
FIA-approved Safety Features
Roll Hoop and Lateral Driver's Head Protective Padding
Deformable, double-jointed steering column
Removable steering wheel
Six-point, 3-inch driver's shoulder and lap harnesses
FT3 fuel cell
Manually operated 5 kg fire extinguisher

===== Engine =====
The engine is a sealed, 16-valve, 4-cylinder Renault Sport type F4R FRS with Orbisoud race exhaust system and catalytic converter, built and developed by Renault Sport.

Capacity: 1998 cc
Max Output: 192 bhp (143 kW) at 6,500 rpm
Max Torque: 22mkg (159lb.ft) at 5,500 rpm
Lubrication: Dry Sump, Elf Evolution LDX 5w/40
Spark Plugs: NGK PFR6E10
ECU: Sealed Magneti-Marelli MF4L ignition system

===== Gearbox =====
Formula Renault uses a Sadev 6-speed, sequential gearbox with mechanical control featuring three specified sets of ratios using a Limited Slip Differential and Twin-Plate. The clutch is hydraulic. It also uses Elf Transmission LS.

===== Suspension =====
Front: Pushrod, controlled single damper with adjustable bump and rebound
Rear: Pushrod, controlled twin dampers with adjustable bump and rebound

===== Brake =====
The brakes are four-pot calipers, with ventilated discs and Ferodo(type DS4003) pads. They include cockpit-adjustable bias front-to-rear.

===== Tyres =====
Front: 16/53 x 13 inches (330 mm)
Rear: 23/57 x 13 inches (330 mm)
Manufacturer: Michelin control
Exceptions
Asia: Kumho (since 2002)
Brazil: Pirelli (2002–2006)
North America: Yokohama (since 2004)

===== Wheels =====
Front: 8 inches x 13 inches (330 mm)
Rear: 10 inches x 13 inches (330 mm)
Manufacturer: OZ

==== 2010–present ====
Manufactured by Barazi-Epsilon EB01 A

Main changes to the previous models are:

- Engine: 2.0L Renault F4R 832 - maximal output has been raised to 210 bhp (160 kW)
- Gearbox is now 7-speed sequential

=== Championships ===
Two sorts of Formula Renault 2.0 championships exist. Regular championships and Winter Series, an off-season championship held usually between November and February with few races. In 2005, all series names were replaced from Formula Renault 2000 to Formula Renault 2.0.

An Uruguayan 2.0L series is also held (José Pedro Passadores 2003 champion).

Formula Renault 2.0L official championships
Europe
Zone/Country	Last official series name	Active years	Tyres	Complementary information	Winter Series
(Switzerland) (Italy) Alps	Italian Formula Renault Championship	2000–2010	M	Also known as: Formula Renault 2.0 Italia, Former name: Formula Renault 2000 Italia (2000–04)	2001-2008
(Switzerland) (Italy) Alps	Formula Renault 2.0 Middle European Championship	2002–2010	M	Former names: Formule Renault 2.0 Suisse, Renault Speed Trophy F2000, (LO) Formula Renault 2.0 Switzerland	
(Switzerland) (Italy) Alps	Formula Renault 2.0 Alps	2002-2015	M	Created by merger of Middle European and Italian championships.	
(Switzerland) (Italy) Alps	Challenge Formula Renault 2.0 Italia	2011-2012	M	Replaces Formula Renault 2.0 Italia. Uses cars built between 2000 and 2009.	
Estonia	Formula Renault 2.0 Estonia	2008	M	Only champion: Jesse Krohn (Finland) and P1 Motorsport	
Europe	Challenge Européen de Formule Renault	1972–1974	M	Replaced the Criterium de Formule Renault (1973–74)	
Europe	Challenge de Formule Renault Europe	1975–1977	M	Replaced the French Formula Three Championship	
Europe	Eurocup Formula Renault 2.0 (part of World Series by Renault)	1991-2020	M	Former names: Rencontres Internationales de Formule Renault, Formula Renault Eurocup, Formula Renault 2000 Eurocup, Formula Renault 2000 Masters.[1]	
(Germany) (Netherlands) Northern Europe	Formula Renault 2.0 Germany	1991–1999, 2001–2005	M	Merge with Formula Renault 2.0 Netherlands to create Formula Renault 2.0 Northern European Cup. Former names: Formula Renault 2000 Germany, Formula Renault Germany.[1]	
(Germany) (Netherlands) Northern Europe	Formula Renault 2.0 Netherlands	1991–1995, 2003–2005	M	Merge with Formula Renault 2.0 Germany to create Formula Renault 2.0 Northern European Cup. Former name Formula Renault 2000 Netherlands.	
(Germany) (Netherlands) Northern Europe	Formula Renault 2.0 Northern European Cup	2006-2018	M	Replaced the German and Dutch championships. Also named Formula Renault 2.0 NEC. Organized by MdH Motorsport and Renault Sport Germany.	
(Germany) (Netherlands) Northern Europe	Formula Renault 2.0 Northern European Cup FR2000	2010	M	Secondary class to Formula Renault 2.0 Northern European Cup.	
Portugal	Fórmula Júnior FR2.0 Portugal	2008	M	Only champion: Gonçalo Araújo (Portugal), Winter Series champion: James Calado (UK)	2008
(Denmark) (Sweden) (Finland) Scandinavia	Formula Renault 2.0 Nordic Series	2002–2006	M	Former name: Formula Renault 2000 Scandinavia.	
(Denmark) (Sweden) (Finland) Scandinavia	Formula Renault 2.0 Finland	2008–2010	M	Organized by AKK-Motorsport and Renault Sport Germany.	
(Denmark) (Sweden) (Finland) Scandinavia	Formula Renault 2.0 Sweden	2009–2010	M	Organized by Joakim Wiedesheim and Renault Sport Sweden.	
Spain	Spanish Formula Renault Championship	1991–1997	M	Also known as: Campeonato de España de Fórmula Renault, Replaced by World Series by Nissan in 1998	
United Kingdom	Formula Renault 2.0 UK	1989–2011	M	Organised by Renault Sport UK since 1990, using Michelin tyres since 1992, Also known as: Formula Renault 2.0 UK, Former names: Formula Renault Sport UK (1995–99), Formula Renault 2000 UK (2000–04).[1]	1998-2011
United Kingdom	Protyre Formula Renault	1995-2014	M	Organised by the British Automobile Racing Club. Previously known as the FR2000 class and Formula Renault BARC	2007-2013
(France) (Belgium) Western Europe	French Formula Renault Championship	1971–1972, 1975–2007	M	Also known as: Championnat de France Formula Renault 2.0, Former names: Critérium de Formule Renault, Championnat de Formule Renault Nationale, Championnat de France Formule Renault, Championnat de France Formule Renault Turbo, Championnat de France Formule Renault, and Championnat de France Formule Renault 2000[1], Replaced by F Renault 2.0 WEC.	
(France) (Belgium) Western Europe	Formula Renault 2.0 West European Cup	2008–2009	M	Replace the French championship. Also named Formula Renault 2.0 WEC.	
America
Zone/Country	Last official series name	Active years	Tyres	Complementary information	Winter Series
Argentina	Argentine Formula Renault Championship	since 1980	P	Uses Tito 02 chassis	
Brazil	Formula Renault 2.0 Brazil	2002–2006	P	Former name: Formula Renault 2000 Brazil.	
(Mexico) Latin America	Mexican Formula Renault Championship	2002–2004	M	Replaced by Formula Renault 2000 de America	
(Mexico) Latin America	Formula Renault 2000 de America	2005–2007	M	Replace the Mexican Formula Renault Championship.	
(United States) (Canada) North America	North American Fran Am 2000 Pro Championship	2002–2003	M	Replaced by Formula TR 2000 Pro Series. Former name: North American Formula Renault 2000.	2003
(United States) (Canada) North America	Formula TR 2000 Pro Series	2004–2007	Y	USA, West coast only.	2004
Asia
Zone/Country	Last official series name	Active years	Tyres	Complementary information	Winter Series
(China) (Malaysia) Asia	Formula Renault AsiaCup	2002–2019, 2022	K	Reward the China Formula Renault Challenge including Chinese events only. Reward also the best Asian driver with the Asian Challenge Category.	

=== Winners ===
A majority of Formula Renault champions have gone onto lead successful careers in motor racing, most notably Alain Prost who won the Formula One World Championship four times in his career. Other drivers include Didier Pironi, Kimi Räikkönen, Felipe Massa and Lewis Hamilton all of whom have gone onto win Grands Prix.

=== Formula Renault 2.0L timeline ===
Formulas Renault 2.0L timeline
		1970s									1980s										1990s										2000s										2010s
		71	72	73	74	75	76	77	78	79	80	81	82	83	84	85	86	87	88	89	90	91	92	93	94	95	96	97	98	99	00	01	02	03	04	05	06	07	08	09	10	11	12	13
France		Critérium de FR				Championnat de Formule Renault Nationale			Championnat de France Formule Renault				Championnat de France Formule Renault Turbo							Championnat de France Formule Renault											Championnat de France FR 2000					Championnat de France FR 2.0			FR 2.0 WEC
Europe			Challenge Européen de Formule Renault			Challenge de Formule Renault Europe																(g)		Eurocup Formula Renault							FR 2000 Eurocup			(a)	(b)	Eurocup Formula Renault 2.0
United Kingdom																				Formula Renault UK						Formula Renault Sport UK					Formula Renault 2000 UK					FR 2.0 UK
United Kingdom																										Formula Renault BARC
United Kingdom																													Winter series							Winter series							Finals series
Northern Europe	Germany																					Formula Renault Germany										Formula Renault 2000 Germany				(c)	FR 2.0 NEC
Northern Europe	Netherlands																					Formula Renault Netherlands												FR 2000 NLD		(d)	FR 2.0 NEC
Italy																															Formula Renault 2000 Italia					FR 2.0 Italia
Italy																																Winter series				Winter
Scandinavia / Finland																																	FR 2000 Scandinavia			FR 2.0 Nordic Series			FR 2.0 Finland
Switzerland																																		(e)		FR 2.0 Suisse					MEC	FR 2.0 Alps
Portugal																																							Junior FR2.0
United States	North America																																(f)		Formula TR 2000 Pro Series
United States	North America																																	W	W
Brazil																																	FR 2000 Brazil			FR 2.0 Brazil
Latin America	Mexico																																FR 2000 Mexico			FR 2000 de America
Asia/China																																	Asian/China Formula Renault Challenge
		71	72	73	74	75	76	77	78	79	80	81	82	83	84	85	86	87	88	89	90	91	92	93	94	95	96	97	98	99	00	01	02	03	04	05	06	07	08	09	10	11	12	13
		1970s									1980s										1990s										2000s										2010s

- "FR" = Formula Renault; italic = Former series; "Winter series" or "Winter" or "W" = Winter series of the above series
- (a) = Formula Renault 2000 Masters; (b) = Formula Renault 2000 Eurocup; (c) = Formula Renault 2.0 Germany; (d) = Formula Renault 2.0 Netherlands; (e) = Renault Speed Trophy F2000; (f) = North American Fran Am 2000 Pro Championship; (g) = Rencontres Internationales de Formule Renault

== Formula Renault 1.6L ==
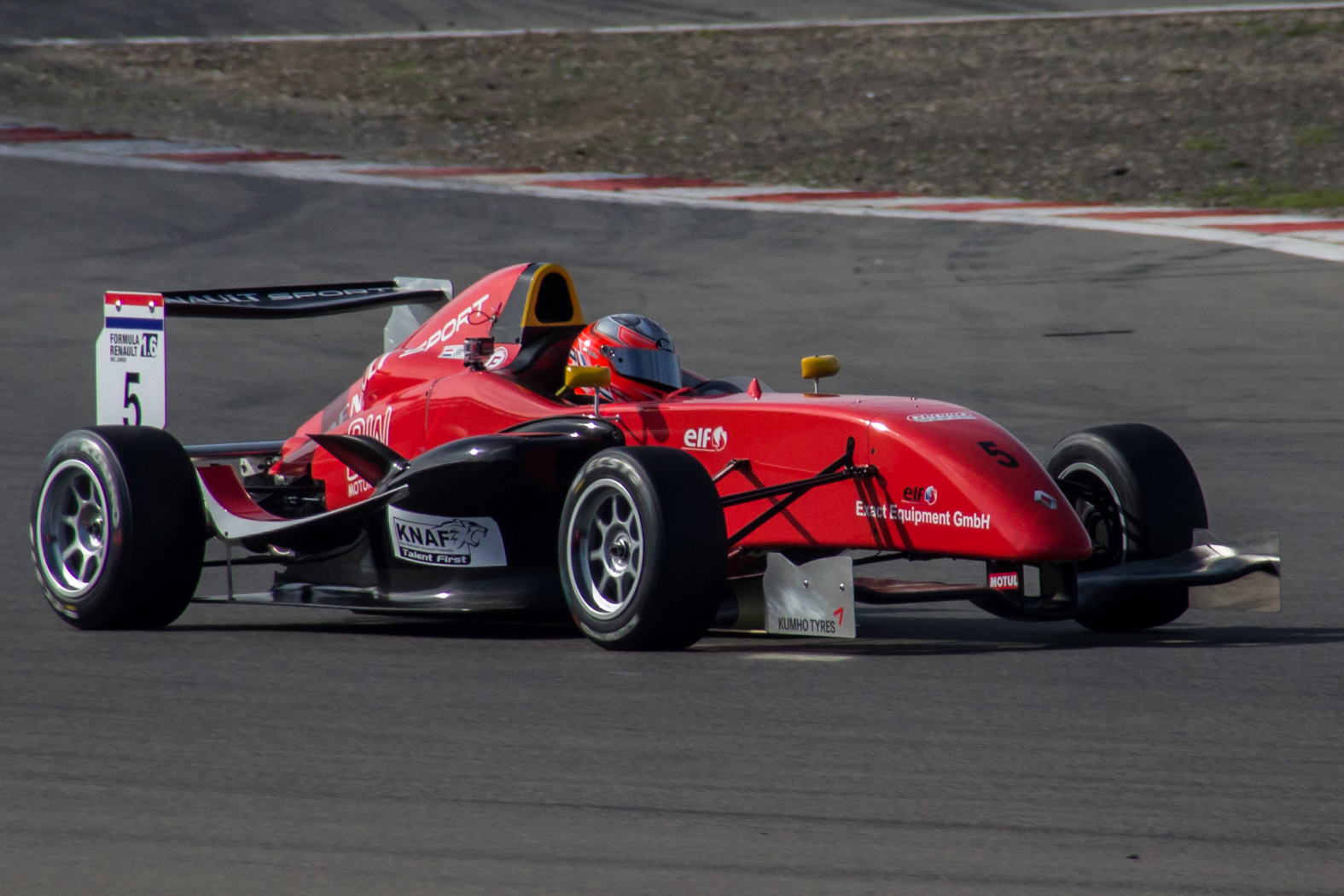
Formula Renault 1.6 NEC Junior at Nurburgring 2013

This Formula Renault series was open to drivers between 14 and 21 years that have raced before in karting series.

=== The cars ===
The cars use K4M 1598cc Renault engines.

=== Championships ===
Formula Renault 1.6L official championships
Europe
Zone/Country	Last official series name	Active years	Tyres	Complementary information
Belgium	Formula Renault 1.6 Belgium	2003–2007	M	Former name: Formula Renault 1600 Belgium. Reguled by the Royal Automobile Club of Belgium
France	F4 Eurocup 1.6 (part of World Series by Renault)	1993-2017	M	Former names: Championnat de France FFSA Formule Campus Renault Elf, Formul'Academy Euro Series. The series is managed by La Filière Elf since 1993, La Filière FFSA since 2001 and by the Auto Sport Academy based near the Circuit Bugatti in Le Mans since 2008.
Italy	Formula Junior 1.6 powered by Renault	2002–2006	M	Former name: Formula Junior 1600 by Renault. In 2007, it was replaced by Formula Monza 1.6 and 1.2 powered by Fiat engine.
Spain	Formula Renault 1.6 Spain	2002–2004	M	Former name: Formula Junior 1600 Spain
(Netherlands) (Belgium) (Germany) Western Europe	Formula Renault 1.6 NEC Junior	2013–2014	K	
(Sweden) (Finland) (Estonia) Northern Europe	Formula Renault 1.6 Nordic	2013–2015	D M	Series supporting STCC. Used Dunlop tyres during 2013–2014 season, changed to Michelin for 2015 following its parent series. Will continue in 2016 without Renault support.
America
Zone/Country	Last official series name	Active years	Tyres	Complementary information
Argentina	Formula Renault Elf 1.6 Argentina	2007-2009	M	Replaced in 2010 by FR 2.0
(Mexico) Latin America	Formula Junior 1600	2005–2007	M	
(United States) (Canada) North America	North American Fran Am 1600 Pro Championship	2002–2003	M	Replaced by Formula TR 1600 Pro Series
(United States) (Canada) North America	Formula TR 1600 Pro Series	2004–2007	Y	Held on west coast only.

=== Winners ===
Formula Renault 1.6L championships winners
Year	Argentina	France	Belgium	Italy	Latin America	(United States) (Canada) North America	Spain
2010	(Argentina) Nicolás Trosset	(Belgium) Stoffel Vandoorne					
2009	(Argentina) Facundo Ardusso	(Belgium) Benjamin Bailly					
2008	(Argentina) Guido Falaschi	(France) Arthur Pic					
2007	(Argentina) Mariano Werner	(France) Jean-Éric Vergne	(Latvia) Karline Stala		(Mexico) Gerardo Nieto	(United States) Ryan Booth	
2006	(Argentina) Mariano Werner	(France) Kevin Estre	(United Kingdom) Craig Dolby	(Argentina) Augusto Scalbi	(Colombia) Juan Esteban Jacobo	(United States) Parker Kligerman	
2005	(Argentina) Lucas Benamo	(France) Jean Karl Vernay	(Belgium) Pierre Sevrin	(Italy) Pasquale Di Sabatino (Italy) Davide Ruzzon	(Mexico) Alfonso Toledano Jr.	(United States) Carl Skerlong	
2004	(Argentina) Ezequiel Bosio	(France) Jacky Ferré	(Belgium) Maxime Soulet	(Romania) Michael Herck		(United States) Marco Andretti	(Romania) Michael Herck
2003	(Argentina) Maximiliano Merlino	(France) Laurent Groppi	(Belgium) Jérôme d'Ambrosio	(Italy) Marino Spinozzi (Italy) Domenico Capuano		(United States) Colin Braun	(Spain) Juan Antonio del Pino
2002	(Argentina) Rafael Morgenstern	(France) Loïc Duval		(Italy) Barbieri		(United States) Tim Barber	(Spain) Adrián Vallés
2001	(Argentina) Rafael Morgenstern	(France) Bruce Lorgeré-Roux					
2000	(Argentina) Esteban Guerrieri	(France) Stéphane Morat					
1999	(Argentina) Mariano Acebal	(United Kingdom) Adam Jones					
1998	(Argentina) Gabriel Ponce de León	(United Kingdom) Westley Barber					
1997	(Argentina) Mauro Fartuszek	(Spain) Marcel Costa					
1996	(Argentina) Martín Basso	(France) Philippe Benoliel					
1995	(Argentina) Brian Smith	(France) Renaud Malinconi					
1994	(Argentina) Guillermo Di Giacinti	(France) Franck Montagny					
1993	(Argentina) Juan Manuel Silva	(France) Sébastien Philippe					
1992	(Argentina) Norberto Della Santina						
1991	(Argentina) Omar Martinez						
1990	(Argentina) Omar Martinez						
1989	(Argentina) Sergio Solmi						
1988	(Argentina) Luis Belloso						
1987	(Argentina) Daniel Neviani						
1986	(Argentina) Gabriel Furlán						
1985	(Argentina) Miguel Angel Etchegaray						
1984	(Argentina) Néstor Gurini						
1983	(Argentina) Néstor Gurini						
1982	(Argentina) Roberto Urretavizcaya						
1981	(Argentina) Carlos Lauricella						
1980	(Argentina) Víctor Rosso						

- Only white square represent held championships.
- Small name and flag represent Winter Series winner.
- In Belgium 2007 championship, Karline Stala was the first ever woman to win a single seaters championship. She was invited to test the Formula Renault 3.5L at Circuit Paul Ricard in November 2007, like the best 2.0L and 3.5L drivers.

=== Formula Renault 1.6L timeline ===
Formulas Renault 1.6L timeline
	1980s										1990s										2000s
	80	81	82	83	84	85	86	87	88	89	90	91	92	93	94	95	96	97	98	99	00	01	02	03	04	05	06	07	08	09
Argentina	Formula Renault Argentina
France														Formula Campus Renault; La Filière Elf								Formula Campus Renault; La Filière FFSA							Formul' Academy
North America																							Fran Am 1600 Pro		Formula TR 1600 Pro Series
Italy																							FJ 1600 by Renault		Formula Junior 1.6 by Renault
Spain																							FJ 1600 Spain		FR 1.6 Spain
Belgium																								FR 1600 Belgium		FR 1.6 Belgium
Latin America																										Formula Junior 1600
	80	81	82	83	84	85	86	87	88	89	90	91	92	93	94	95	96	97	98	99	00	01	02	03	04	05	06	07	08	09
	1980s										1990s										2000s

- "FR" = Formula Renault; "FJ" = Formula Junior; italic = Former series

== Other formulas powered by Renault ==
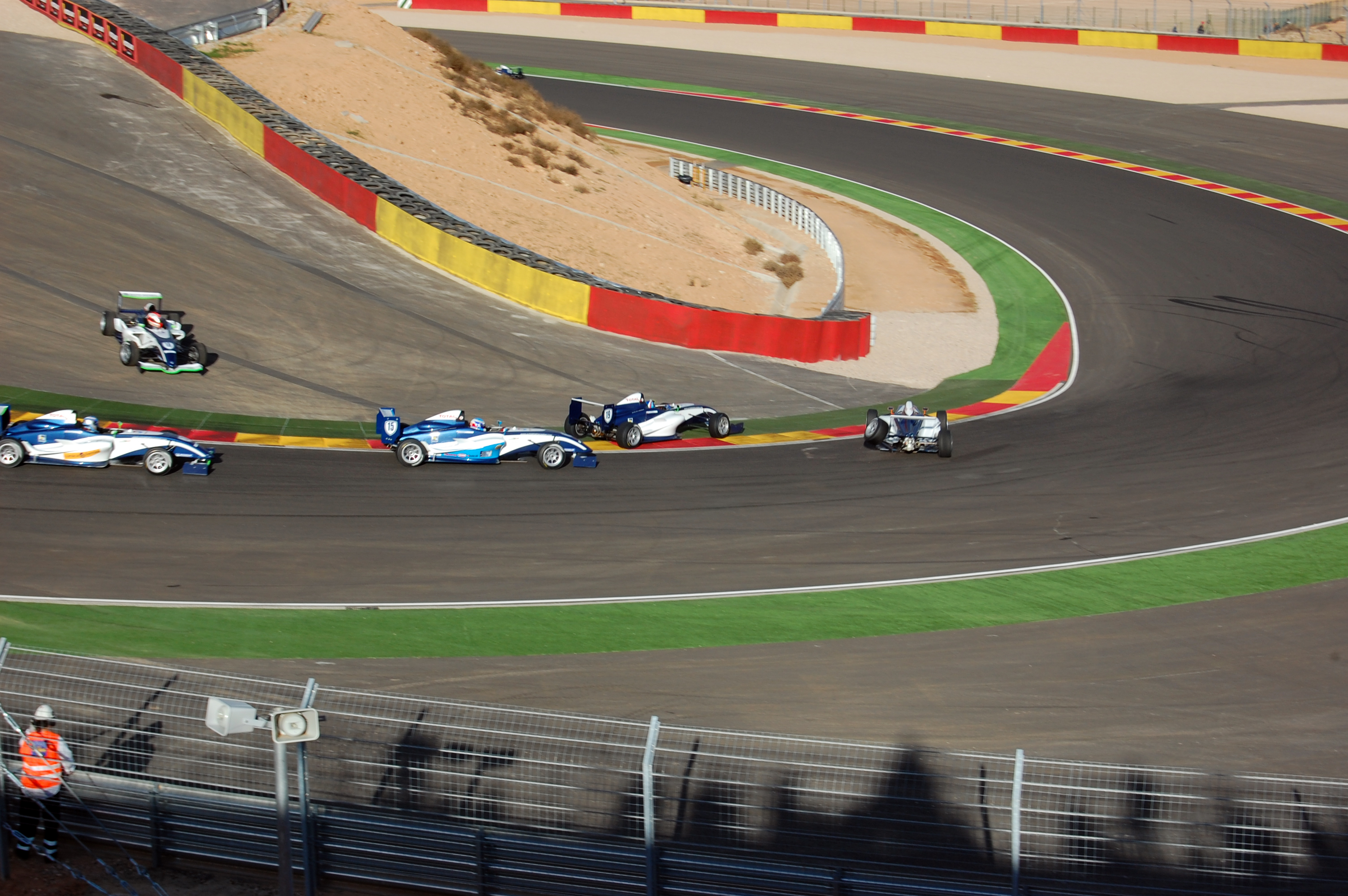
A race in the Formul'Academy Euro Series at Ciudad del Motor de Aragón, Spain (2009)

Argentina organises several Formula Renault championships different from its official 2.0L series:

- Fórmula Renault Plus (since 2007) with Renault Clio K4M engine (1598cc).
- Fórmula Renault Interprovincial (since 2007) with 1.397 cc engine from Renault 12 T.S Break.
- Fórmula 4 Nacional (in 2007) with Renault K4M engine (1598cc) with lower power than the official 1.6L series. Teams can choose chassis manufacturer. Races are held during the TC 2000 weekends.
- Fórmula 4 Metropolitana (since 2008 season) with Renault K4M engine (1598cc) and replacing the Fórmula 4 Nacional series. Teams can choose chassis manufacturer.
- Fórmula Super Renault with Dallara, Reynard, Ralt or TOM'S chassis and Renault 21, 18 or F3R 2.0L engine. In 2005, the championship wasn't held due to low participation.

In 2008, the Formula 2000 Light was created. The series is held in Italy with Tatuus's Formula Renault or Formula Three chassis. The same year also saw the introduction of the LATAM Challenge Series, run in Latin America. The Austria Formel Renault Cup has been held since 2007 in Central Europe. This series is held and organised with the Austria Formula 3 Cup and use the 2.0L Renault formulas. The Formule Renault 2.0 North European Zone was also introduced in 2008.

2008 was the first, and ultimately last, season of the Formula Asia 2.0. Its aim was to bring more racing to the Asian region, allowing more drivers to opportunity to race and make the step up to the next level. The series used Renault engines with constructor Tatuus and ran on Michelin provided tyres.

=== Winners ===
For GP Series winners, see GP2 Series, GP2 Asia Series and GP3 Series pages.

Other formulas powered by Renault championships winners
Year	(Austria) Austria Formel Renault Cup	Formule Renault 2.0 North European Zone	(Italy) Formula 2000 Light	Formula Asia 2.0	(Argentina) Fórmula Super Renault/ Renault Plus	(Argentina) Fórmula 4 Metropolitana/ Nacional	(Argentina) Fórmula Interprovencial	(Mexico) LATAM Challenge Series
2010	(France) Grégory Striebig	(Sweden) Daniel Roos	(Italy) Stefano Turchetto (Italy) Adolfo Bottura	TBA	TBA	TBA	TBA	TBA
2009	(Estonia) Vanaselja Tönis	(Sweden) Felix Rosenqvist	(Germany) Thiemo Storz (1) (Brazil) Francisco Weiler	not held	(Argentina) Alan Castellano	(Argentina) Emiliano González	(Argentina) Darío Elisei	(Costa Rica) André Solano
2008	(France) Grégory Striebig	(Finland) Jesse Krohn	(Italy) Mario Bertolotti (Chile) Martin Scuncio	(Sweden) Felix Rosenqvist	(Argentina) Mario Gerbaldo	(Argentina) Alan Castellano	(Argentina) Fabricio Fernandez	(Venezuela) Giancarlo Serenelli
2007	(France) Grégory Striebig	not held	not held	not held	(Argentina) Esteban Sarry	(Argentina) Francesco Troncoso (N)	(Argentina) Alejandro Pancello	not held
2006	not held	not held	not held	not held	(Argentina) Eric Borsini	not held	not held	not held
2005	not held	not held	not held	not held	not held	not held	not held	not held
2004	not held	not held	not held	not held	(Argentina) Ivo Perabó	not held	not held	not held
2003	not held	not held	not held	not held	(Argentina) Federico Lifschitz	not held	not held	not held
2002	not held	not held	not held	not held	(Argentina) Matías Rossi	not held	not held	not held
2001	not held	not held	not held	not held	?	not held	not held	not held
2000	not held	not held	not held	not held	?	not held	not held	not held
1999	not held	not held	not held	not held	?	not held	not held	not held
1998	not held	not held	not held	not held	?	not held	not held	not held
1997	not held	not held	not held	not held	(Argentina) Christian Ledesma	not held	not held	not held

- (N) : Fórmula 4 Nacional held only in 2007.
- (1) = Thiemo Storz finish second overall but Pierluigi Veronesi, the series champion, use a Dallara Formula 3 car.

== See also ==
- List of Formula Renault cars
