= 2004 Formula Renault seasons =

2004 Formula Renault

Seasons
- ← 2003 2005 →

This page describe all the 2004 seasons of Formula Renault series.

== Formula Renault 2.0L ==
=== 2004 Formula Renault 2000 UK season ===
All races held in United Kingdom. Mike Conway won the championship title.

Round		Circuit	Date	Winning driver	Winning team
1	R1	Thruxton Circuit, Hampshire	11 April	(United Kingdom) Mike Conway	Fortec Motorsport
1	R2	Thruxton Circuit, Hampshire	11 April	(United Kingdom) Mike Conway	Fortec Motorsport
2	R3	Brands Hatch (Indy), Kent	25 April	(United Kingdom) Westley Barber	Comtec Racing
2	R4	Brands Hatch (Indy), Kent	25 April	(United Kingdom) Westley Barber	Comtec Racing
3	R5	Silverstone International, Northamptonshire	8 May	(Sweden) Alex Storckenfeldt	Mark Burdett Motorsport
3	R6	Silverstone International, Northamptonshire	9 May	(United Kingdom) Mike Conway	Fortec Motorsport
4	R7	Oulton Park, Cheshire	22 May	(Canada) Sean McIntosh	Team Firstair
4	R8	Oulton Park, Cheshire	23 May	(United Kingdom) Westley Barber	Comtec Racing
5	R9	Thruxton Circuit, Hampshire	29 May	(United Kingdom) Westley Barber	Comtec Racing
5	R10	Thruxton Circuit, Hampshire	29 May	(United Kingdom) Mike Conway	Fortec Motorsport
6	R11	Croft Circuit, North Yorkshire	24 July	(United Kingdom) Mike Conway	Fortec Motorsport
6	R12	Croft Circuit, North Yorkshire	25 July	(United Kingdom) Mike Conway	Fortec Motorsport
7	R13	Knockhill Racing Circuit, Fife	7 August	(United Kingdom) Paul di Resta	Manor Motorsport
7	R14	Knockhill Racing Circuit, Fife	8 August	(United Kingdom) Westley Barber	Comtec Racing
8	R15	Brands Hatch (Indy), Kent	21 August	(United Kingdom) Paul di Resta	Manor Motorsport
8	R16	Brands Hatch (Indy), Kent	22 August	(United Kingdom) Paul di Resta	Manor Motorsport
9	R17	Snetterton Motor Racing Circuit, Norfolk	4 September	(United Kingdom) Mike Conway	Fortec Motorsport
9	R18	Snetterton Motor Racing Circuit, Norfolk	5 September	(United Kingdom) Mike Conway	Fortec Motorsport
10	R19	Donington Park (National), Leicestershire	25 September	(United Kingdom) Westley Barber	Comtec Racing
10	R20	Donington Park (National), Leicestershire	26 September	(United Kingdom) Paul di Resta	Manor Motorsport

=== 2004 Renault Speed Trophy F2000 season ===
- Point system: 25, 22, 20, 18, 16, 14, 12, 10, 8, 6, 5, 4, 3, 2, 1 for 15th. 1 point for fastest lap and 1 pont for pole position.

Some venues include non Suisse drivers who not compete for the final standing. These drivers aren't included in the following result table.

Pos	Driver	Team	(France) DIJ April 10–11		(Italy) VAR May 1–2		(Austria) SAL May 22	(France) DIJ June 12–13		(Czech Republic) MOS August 14–15		(Germany) HOC October 9–10	Points
Pos	Driver	Team	1	2	3	4	5	6	7	8	9	10	Points
1	(Switzerland) Nicolas Maulini	Ecurie la Meute	2	6	2	1	2*	3	3	4	5	1*	205
2	(Switzerland) Julien Ducommun	Iris Racing	1*	4	1	3	3	2	5	1	3	Ret	195
3	(Switzerland) Sandro Manuzzi	Conrad Racing Sport	3	3	10	2*	4	1	1	2*	4	Ret	179
4	(Switzerland) Rahel Frey	Iris Racing	5	1	5	7	Ret	5	6	4	6	3	151
5	(Switzerland) David Oberle	Jenzer Motorsport	12	2*	4	6	Ret	4	2*	Ret	1*	2	150
6	(Switzerland) Cyndie Allemann	Jenzer Motorsport	6	5	3*	5	5	6	4	8	2		147
7	(Switzerland) Ralph Meichtry	Race Performance	4	11	6	4	1	8*	DNS	3	7		123
8	(Switzerland) Louis Maulini	Ecurie la Meute	8	8	9	Ret		7	8			6	64
9	(Switzerland) Patrick Cicchiello	Team Cicciello	9	9	7	8	Ret			6	Ret	Ret	52
10	(Switzerland) Florian Lachat							7	9	7	8		50
11	(Switzerland) Jonathan Hirschi	Ecurie 3 Chevrons	10	10	8	9						4	48
12	(Switzerland) Christian Broillet	Gruère Racing Team					6	DNS	7			5	42
13	(Switzerland) Beat Wittwer	Jenzer Motorsport	7	7	11	Ret	Ret						29
14	(Switzerland) Nicolas Auderset	Gruère Racing Team	11	12	12	10							19
15	(Switzerland) Thomas Keller	Conrad Racing Team										7	12

=== 2004 Copa Corona Formula Renault 2000 de America season ===
- Point system : 30, 24, 20, 16, 12, 10, 8, 6, 4, 2 for 10th. Extra 2 points for Fastest lap and 2 points for Pole position.

Pos	Driver	Team (and sponsors)	(Mexico) TOR June 13	(Mexico) QUE June 20	(Mexico) ZAC July 11	(Mexico) LEO August 1	(Mexico) SAL August 29	(Mexico) PAC September 19	(Mexico) AGU October 10	(Mexico) GUA October 24	(Mexico) MEX November 7	(Mexico) SAN November 21	Points
Pos	Driver	Team (and sponsors)	1	2	3	4	5	6	7	8	9	10	Points
1	(Mexico) Homero Richards	Nextel Racing	Ret	1*	4	1*	Ret	1	Ret	1*	4	2	186
2	(Mexico) Hugo Oliveras	Nextel Racing	2	4	Ret	3	7	2	6	5	1*	1	180
3	(Mexico) Oscar Hidalgo, Jr.	Hidalgo Racing Signal Jeans	1*	6	2	7	1*	10*	2*	6	2	14	178
4	(Mexico) Antonio Pérez	Corona	5	5	1*	5	Ret	7		3	3	3	136
5	(Mexico) Eduardo González	Unico Competition	3	2	7	4	12	5	Ret	Ret	7	5	102
6	(Mexico) Diego Fernández	Herdez Competition	8	8	5	13	5	3	1	8	14	15	92
7	(Mexico) José A. Ramos	Unico Competition	7	12	Ret	2	2	Ret	13	Ret	5	4	84
8	(Mexico) Mauricio Godínez	Dynamic Motorsport Daewoo	4	7	3	6	3	9					78
9	(Mexico) Fernando Iriarte	Nextel Racing	6	3	Ret	9	6	6	9				60
10	(Mexico) Iván Ramos	Dynamic Motorsport	10	11	6	12	4	11	7	4	Ret	7	60
11	(Mexico) Carlos Mastretta	Daewoo							5	2	6	6*	48
12	(Mexico) Daniel Méndez	Corona, Excelencia Plaza	Ret	10	Ret	Ret	Ret	4	3		9	Ret	42
13	(Mexico) Israel Jaitovich	Derbez/Jaitovich ANL American Apotex	Ret	13	11	10	8	13	8	7	11	12	22
14	(Mexico) Pablo Cervantes	Sico Racing	13	9	8	11	9	12	10	10	Ret	9	22
15	(Mexico) Javier Ramos	Dynamic Motorsport	12			Ret		8			8	8	18
16	(Argentina) Waldemar Coronas	Corona							4	Ret			16
17	(Mexico) Patrick Goeters	Corona				8							6
18	(Mexico) Claus Schinkel	Herdez Competition	9										4
19	(Mexico) José Montaño	Unico Competition	14	14	9	14		14					4
20	(Mexico) Oscar Terán	Herdez Competition					11	15	12	9	13	11	4
21	(Mexico) Juan Pablo García	Auto Show TV									10	10	4
22	(Mexico) Eduardo Peña	Derbez/Jaitovich ANL American	11	Ret	10								2
23	(Mexico) Eduardo Ortiz	Unico Competition					10						2
NC	(Mexico) Gerardo Forcelledo	Forcelledo Racing				Ret			11	Ret	Ret		0
NC	(Mexico) Lorenzo Mariscal	SportCar.com									12		0
NC	(Mexico) Horacio Richards	Nextel Competition										13	0
NC	(Mexico) German Quiroga	Unico Competition									15	Ret	0
-	(Mexico) Ricardo Pérez de L.	Herdez Competition				Ret							0

=== 2004 Formula Renault 2.0 Brazil season ===
- Point system : 30, 24, 20, 16, 12, 10, 8, 6, 4, 2 for 10th. One point for Pole position and one point for Fastest lap were also distributed.

Galid Osman Didi, Jr. finish first in the Category B Championship with 60 points behind William Starostik (24pts).

Pos	Driver	Team	(Brazil) CUR March 14	(Brazil) LON April 4	(Brazil) BRA May 30		(Brazil) CAM June 20	(Brazil) VIT July 25	(Brazil) RIO August 22		(Brazil) TAR October 10		(Brazil) SAO October 24	(Brazil) FLO November 21	(Brazil) SAO December 12–13		Points	Points (R)
Pos	Driver	Team	1	2	3	4	5	6	7	8	9	10	11	12	13	14	Points	Points (R)
1	(Brazil) Alexandre Foizer	Cesário F.Renault	4	3	2	1	1	2	3	5	1	5	1	6	3	Ret	278	
2	(Brazil) Daniel Serra	Bassani Racing	2	1*	17	7	10	3	1*	1	4	2	2	Ret	4	3	251	
3	(Brazil) Alan Hellmeister	Dragão Motorsport	Ret	15	4	6	1*	1*	2	Ret*	2*	1*	10	5	2*	1*	240	
4	(Brazil) Carlos Iaconelli	PropCar Racing	7	9	Ret	4	9	6	Ret	3	6	3	9	1	1	4	187	336
5	(Brazil) Bia Figueiredo	Cesário/Bassani	3	2	3	9	3	9	5	7	5	Ret	4	2	13	9	168	
6	(Brazil) Paulo Salustiano	M4T Motorsport	1	Ret	1	8	8	2	Ret	8	7	11	19		5	6	138	
7	(Brazil) André Sousa	Full Time Sports	14	5	7*	Ret	4	Ret	4	2	Ret	7	18	3	6	8	119	
8	(Brazil) Vinicius Canhedo	M4T Racing	10	8	6	2	6	5	Ret	9	10	4	16	DNS	Ret	10	91	296
9	(Brazil) Felipe Lapenna	M4T Racing	Ret	6	9	11	2	Ret	8	10	8	Ret	7	Ret	8	5	76	
10	(Brazil) Diego Nunes	Full Time Sports	6	4	Ret	5	DSQ	Ret	6	DNS	12	6	3				76	
11	(Brazil) Anderson Faria	PropCar Racing	15*	Ret	5	3*	7	10	7	6	11	8	20	DNS	11	11	68	
12	(Brazil) Gustavo Foizer	Cesário F.Renault	8	14	13	14	8	7	Ret	11	3	9	13	4	10	Ret	62	
13	(Brazil) Douglas Soares	M4T Motorsport	9	7	10	12	Ret	Ret	9	4	Ret	Ret	6	8*	12	12	49	
14	(Brazil) Nelson Merlo	Bassani Racing											5		7	2	44	
15	(Brazil) George Altmann	Dragão Motorsport	13	12	12	Ret	11	8	10	DNS	9	12	8	7	9	7	38	252
16	(Brazil) Rony Breuel	Cesário/Bassani	11	10	8	10	Ret	7	11	12	Ret	10	15		Ret	Ret	22	188
17	(Brazil) Igor Ciampi	Wogel Sports	5	11	11	16			Ret	Ret							12	
18	(Brazil) Alberto Valério	Dragão Racing											11*		Ret	Ret	1	
NC	(Brazil) Aloizio Silva	Wogel Sports						11									0	
NC	(Brazil) Luiz Boesel	Bassani Racing	12	13													0	28
NC	(Brazil) Carlos Henrique Rosin	Gramacho Racing											12	Ret			0	
NC	(Argentina) Rafael Morgenstern	Wogel Sports	Ret	Ret	Ret	13			Ret	Ret							0	
NC	(Brazil) Galid Osman (B)				14	15											0	
NC	(United Kingdom) James Jakes	Wogel Sports											14				0	
NC	(Brazil) William Starostik (B)				15	Ret											0	
NC	(Brazil) Rossini Sarkis	Bassani Racing			16	17											0	32
NC	(Brazil) Juan Felipe Alves	Wogel Sports											17				0	
-	(Brazil) Renato Jader David		Ret														0	
-	(Brazil) Almir Filho	Wogel Sports						Ret									0	
-	(Brazil) Marcello Thomaz	Full Time Sports												Ret			0	

- (R) = Rookie championship
- (B) = Category B Championship

Pos	Team	Points
1	Bassani Racing	295
2	Cesário F.Renault	289
3	Dragão Motorsport	278
4	Prop Car Racing	255
5	Full Time Sports	195
6	Cesário/Bassani	190
7	M4T Motorsport	187
8	M4T Racing	167
9	Wogel Sports	12
10	Dragão Racing	1
11	Gramacho Racing	0

== Formula Renault 1.6L ==
=== 2004 Championnat de France FFSA Formule Campus Renault Elf season ===
- Point system : ?

All drivers use the La Fillière car. The calendar include 7 venues in various French circuits.

Pos	Driver	Points
1	(France) Jacky Ferré	176
2	(France) Nicolas Navarro	161
3	(France) Romain Vaitilingom	114
4	(France) Benoit Cortier	108
...	...	...

=== 2004 Formula Renault 1600 Belgium season ===
- Point system : ?

Pos	Driver	Team	Points
1	(Belgium) Maxime Soulet	Thierry Boutsen Racing	228
2	(Belgium) Pieter Belmans	Thierry Boutsen Racing	216
3	(Belgium) Bertrand Baguette	Marc Goossens Motorsport	179
4	(Netherlands) Jonatan Tonet		160
5	(France) Tom Dillmann	Tom Team	147
6	(Belgium) Pierre Sevrin		125
7	(Belgium) Eddy Roosens		106
8	(Belgium) Alexandre De Bock		92
9	(United Kingdom) Yonny Weeden		90
10	(Finland) Marko Keränen		82
11	(Belgium) Michael Herck		65
12	(Belgium) Maurizio Pignato		63
13	(Luxembourg) David Hauser		59
14			
15			
16	(Belgium) Alexandre Marissal		40
17	(Finland) Joonas Mannerjärvi		25
18			
19			
20	(Lebanon) Khalil Beschir		16
21	(France) Patrick Pilet		6

=== 2004 Formula Renault Monza season ===
The season was held over 8 races in Italia.

- Point system : 20, 17, 15, 13, 11, 10, 9, 8, 7, 6, 5, 4, 3, 2, 1 for 15th. Extra 1 point for Fastest lap and 2 points for Pole position.

Pos	Driver	Team	Points
1	(Belgium) Michael Herck	Dynamic Engineering	375
2	(Italy) Alessandro Bonetti	Tomcat Racing	345
3	(Italy) Alex Frassineti	Tomcat Racing	294
4	(Italy) Marco Capuani	BVM Minardi Junior Team	239
5	(Italy) Filippo Ponti	Kiwi Esp	136
6	(Italy) Davide D’Antuono	PSR Target Junior Team; CiBiEmme Team	132
7	(Italy) Filippo Tedeschini	CiBiEmme Team; Dynamic Engineering	120
8	(Italy) Andrea Cortinovis	Tomcat Racing	102
9	(Argentina) Andres Rios	Dynamic Engineering	60
10	(Slovenia) David Rotar	Mascheroni Corse	52
11	(Italy) Valerio Prandi	Kiwi Esp	44
12	(Italy) Tobias Tauber	Bem Racing; Dynamic Engineering	44
13	(Russia) Sergey Afanasyev	BVM Minardi Junior Team	32
14	(Belgium) Tom Dillmann	Tom Team	30
15	(France) Romain Iannetta	Dynamic Engineering	24
16	(Italy) Alberto Bassi	M&C Motorsport	22
17	(Italy) Thomas Plank	Bem Racing	22
8	(Italy) Alessandro Tonoli	Tomcat Racing; Dynamic Engineering	16
19	(Italy) Damiano Manni	PSR Target Junior Team	14
20	(Italy) Luca Fiorenti	Kiwi Esp	10
21	(Austria) Walter Grubmüller	BVM Minardi Junior Team	8
22	(France) Patrick Pilet	Dynamic Engineering	8
23	(Italy) Davide Ruzzon	AP Motorsport	8
24	(Italy) Marco Mapelli	Tomcat Racing	2
NC	(Italy) Davide Amaduzzi	PSR Target Junior Team	0
NC	(Austria) Martin Brückl	Bem Racing	0
NC	(Italy) Alessandro Cappato	Dyscovery Racing	0

=== 2004 Formula Renault Elf 1.6 Argentina season ===
- Point system : 20, 15, 12, 10, 8, 6, 4, 3, 2, 1 for 10th. 1 extra point for Pole position. 1 point for start in each race.

Pos	Driver	Team	Points
1	(Argentina) Ezequiel Bosio		139
2	(Argentina) Lucas Benamo		133
3	(Argentina) Gabriel Satorra		115
4	(Argentina) Juan Marcos Angelini		105
5	(Argentina) Ivo Perabó		104
6	(Argentina) Damián Cassino		89
7	(Argentina) Pablo Fioquetta		82
8	(Argentina) Mariano Ponce de León	Ponce de León Competición	49
1	(Argentina) Diego Alberghini		
1	(Argentina) Fernando Astrella		
1	(Argentina) Adrian Bacaloni		
1	(Argentina) Néstor Barovero		
1	(Argentina) Ignazio Beluardo		
1	(Argentina) Juan Pablo Bessone		
1	(Argentina) Benjamin Blachowicz		
1	(Argentina) Bruno Boccanera		
1	(Argentina) Matias Borchichi		
1	(Argentina) Nicolas Branca		
1	(Argentina) Dante D. Catellani		
1	(Argentina) Juan Ciccarelli		
1	(Argentina) Maximiliano Cosma		
1	(Argentina) Fernando Crosta		
1	(Argentina) Facundo Crovo		
1	(Argentina) Florencio Dadomo		
1	(Argentina) Andres De Araújo		
1	(Argentina) Carlos Fernández		
1	(Argentina) Martin Ferrari		
1	(Argentina) Matias Funes		
1	(Argentina) Franco Gagliardi		
1	(Argentina) Jonatan Garnero		
1	(Argentina) Emiliano Giacoponi		
1	(Argentina) Alejandro González		
1	(Argentina) Carlos Host		
1	(Argentina) Jorge Humbert		
1	(Argentina) Matías Jalaf		
1	(Argentina) Agustin Klappenbach		
1	(Argentina) Fabian Lambertucci		
28	(Uruguay) Mauricio Lambiris		13
1	(Argentina) Nelson Lombardo		
1	(Argentina) Roberto Luna		
1	(Argentina) Ivan Maida		
1	(Argentina) Pablo Malizia		
1	(Argentina) Pablo Merayo Nuñez		
1	(Argentina) Juan Minetti		
1	(Argentina) Ignacio Moreira		
1	(Colombia) Sebastian Moreno		
1	(Argentina) Pablo Perotti		
1	(Argentina) Jose Luis Riffo		
1	(Argentina) Gonzalo Sanchez		
1	(Argentina) Pablo Sanchez		
1	(Argentina) Emiliano Santinelli		
1	(Argentina) Martín Serrano		
1	(Argentina) Sebastian Sgroppo		
1	(Argentina) Patricio Signorile		
1	(Argentina) Carlos Sirera		
1	(Argentina) Ezequiel Tudesco		
1	(Colombia) Gonzalo Tunjo		
1	(Argentina) Wilmer Valentin		
1	(Argentina) Jonathan Vazquez		
1	(Argentina) Santiago Ventana		
1	(Argentina) Francisco Viel Bugliotti		
1	(Argentina) Ignacio Vivian		
1	(Argentina) Joaquín Volpi		

=== 2004 Formula TR 1600 Pro Series season ===
The Formula TR 1600 Pro Series is held with the Formula TR 2000 Pro Series. The same point system is used.

Pos	Driver	Team	Points
1	(United States) Marco Andretti	Knudsen Racing	
2	(United States) Adrian Carrio		
3	(United States) Derek Sabol	Knudsen Racing	
4	(Canada) Adam Davis		
	(Canada) Brett Blankers		
	(United States) Rob Bunker		
	(United States) John Michael Edwards		
	(Canada) Adrien Herberts		
	(United States) Race Johnson		
	(United States) John Knudsen	Knudsen Racing	
	(United States) George Latus		
	(South Korea) Ken Lee		
	(United States) Ethan Livernash		
	(United States) Kerry Lynch		
	(Brazil) Mario Moraes		
	(United States) Emile Tabb		
	(United States) Dustin Welch		
	(United States) Alex Wikell		

== Other Formulas powered by Renault championships ==
This section resume unofficial and/or renault engine supplier formula serie.

=== 2004 Fórmula Super Renault season ===
Ivo Perabó won the championship.

Colour	Result
Gold	Winner
Silver	2nd place
Bronze	3rd place
Green	Finished, in points
Green	Retired, in points
Blue	Finished, no points
Purple	Did not finish (Ret)
Purple	Not classified (NC)
Red	Did not qualify (DNQ)
Black	Disqualified (DSQ)
White	Did not start (DNS)
White	Withdrew (WD)
Blank	Did not participate
Blank	Injured (INJ)
Blank	Excluded (EX)
**Bold**	Pole position
*	Fastest lap
spr	Sprint Race
fea	Feature Race
