= Formula Renault 2.0 Brazil =

- Category: Formula Renault 2.0
- Country: Brazil
- Inaugural season: 2002
- Folded: 2006
- Engine suppliers: Renault
- Last Drivers' champion: (Brazil) Felipe Lapenna
- Last Teams' champion: (Brazil) Full Time Racing

Formula Renault 2.0 Brazil was a Formula Renault 2.0 racing series based in Brazil. It ran from 2002 to 2006, and was operated by former Formula One driver Pedro Diniz. Several drivers who have raced in Formula One also previously raced in this series, including Nelson Piquet Jr., Lucas di Grassi and Robert Kubica.

== Champions ==
Season	Champion	Team Champion
2002	(Brazil) Sérgio Jimenez	(Brazil) Bassani Racing
2003	(Brazil) Allam Khodair	(Brazil) Giaffone Racing
2004	(Brazil) Alexandre Foizer	(Brazil) Cesario Fórmula
2005	(Brazil) Nelson Merlo	(Brazil) Bassani Racing
2006	(Brazil) Felipe Lapenna	(Brazil) Full Time Sports

== See also ==
- Formula Renault
