= Pedro Nunes (racing driver) =

Brazilian racing driver

Pedro Henrique Nunes
- Nationality: (Brazil) Brazilian
- Born: 22 August 1988 (age 38) São Paulo (Brazil)

Previous series
- 2010–11 2009 2009 2006–08 2007 2007 2006: GP3 Series; Formula 3 Euro Series; British Formula 3 Formula 3 Sudamericana; Eurocup Formula Renault 2.0; Formula Renault 2.0 NEC; Formula Renault 2.0 Brazil

Pedro Henrique Nunes, also known as Pedro Enrique (born 22 August 1988) is a Brazilian racing driver.

== Career ==
=== Formula Three Sudamericana ===
Nunes drove in the Formula Three Sudamericana championship from 2006 to 2008, finishing as runner-up in his final year in the category.

=== Formula Renault ===
In 2006, Nunes also drove at selected races in the Brazilian Formula Renault series. In 2007, he drove in twenty races overall in Eurocup Formula Renault 2.0 and Formula Renault 2.0 Northern European Cup for SL Formula Racing.

=== Formula Three Euroseries ===
For 2009, Nunes moved to the Formula Three Euroseries for Manor Motorsport, finishing 27th in the championship. He also appeared as a guest driver at the Autódromo Internacional do Algarve in Portimão in British Formula 3.

=== GP3 Series ===
2010 saw Nunes move to the GP3 Series, competing for ART Grand Prix. He joined Esteban Gutiérrez and Alexander Rossi at the team.

Nunes stayed in the series for 2011 alongside Valtteri Bottas and James Calado until he was replaced by Richie Stanaway at Spa.

== Racing record ==
=== Career summary ===
Season	Series	Team	Races	Wins	Poles	F/Laps	Podiums	Points	Position
2006	Formula Renault 2.0 Brazil	Piquet Sports	1	0	0	0	0	22	17th
2006	Formula Renault 2.0 Brazil	Dragão Motorsport	1	0	0	0	0	22	17th
2006	Formula 3 Sudamericana	Piquet Sports	14	0	0	0	0	10	28th
2007	Formula Renault 2.0 NEC	SL Formula Racing	10	0	0	0	0	46	29th
2007	Eurocup Formula Renault 2.0	SL Formula Racing	10	0	0	0	0	0	NC
2007	Formula 3 Sudamericana	Baumer Racing	4	0	0	0	0	1	21st
2008	Formula 3 Sudamericana	Cesário Fórmula	17	5	3	4	11	112	**2nd**
2009	Formula 3 Euro Series	Manor Motorsport	20	0	0	0	0	0	27th
2009	British Formula 3 Championship	Manor Motorsport	2	0	0	0	0	N/A	NC†
2009	Masters of Formula 3	Manor Motorsport	1	0	0	0	0	N/A	20th
2010	GP3 Series	ART Grand Prix	16	0	0	0	0	4	24th
2011	GP3 Series	ART Grand Prix	12	0	0	0	0	0	32nd

† – As Nunes was a guest driver, he was ineligible to score points.

=== Complete Eurocup Formula Renault 2.0 results ===
(key) (Races in bold indicate pole position; races in italics indicate fastest lap)

Year	Entrant	1	2	3	4	5	6	7	8	9	10	11	12	13	14	DC	Points
2007	SL Formula Racing	ZOL; 1; 24	ZOL; 2 Ret	NÜR; 1; 24	NÜR; 2; 28	HUN; 1; 29	HUN; 2; 29	DON; 1; 23	DON; 2; 19	MAG; 1; 27	MAG; 2; 19	EST; 1	EST; 2	CAT; 1	CAT; 2	38th	0

=== Complete Formula Renault 2.0 NEC results ===
(key) (Races in bold indicate pole position) (Races in italics indicate fastest lap)

Year	Entrant	1	2	3	4	5	6	7	8	9	10	11	12	13	14	15	16	DC	Points
2007	SL Formula Racing	ZAN; 1 Ret	ZAN; 2; 20	OSC; 1; 17	OSC; 2; 12	ASS; 1; 12	ASS; 2 Ret	ZOL; 1 Ret	ZOL; 1; 9	NUR; 1; 19	NUR; 2; 12	OSC; 1	OSC; 2	SPA; 1	SPA; 2	HOC; 1	HOC; 2	29th	46

=== Complete GP3 Series results ===
(key) (Races in bold indicate pole position) (Races in italics indicate fastest lap)

Year	Entrant	1	2	3	4	5	6	7	8	9	10	11	12	13	14	15	16	DC	Points
2010	ART Grand Prix	CAT; FEA; 12	CAT; SPR; 6	IST; FEA; Ret	IST; SPR; 19	VAL; FEA; 15	VAL; SPR; 11	SIL; FEA; Ret	SIL; SPR; 20	HOC; FEA; 14	HOC; SPR; 6	HUN; FEA; 19	HUN; SPR; Ret	SPA; FEA; 7	SPA; SPR; 19	MNZ; FEA; 24	MNZ; SPR; Ret	24th	4
2011	Lotus ART	IST; FEA; 22	IST; SPR; 26†	CAT; FEA; 25	CAT; SPR; 26†	VAL; FEA; Ret	VAL; SPR; 15	SIL; FEA; Ret	SIL; SPR; 17	NÜR; FEA; 23	NÜR; SPR; Ret	HUN; FEA; 18	HUN; SPR; 14	SPA; FEA	SPA; SPR	MNZ; FEA	MNZ; SPR	32nd	0

† Was classified despite not finishing the race.
