= Dallara T12 =

Italian racing car

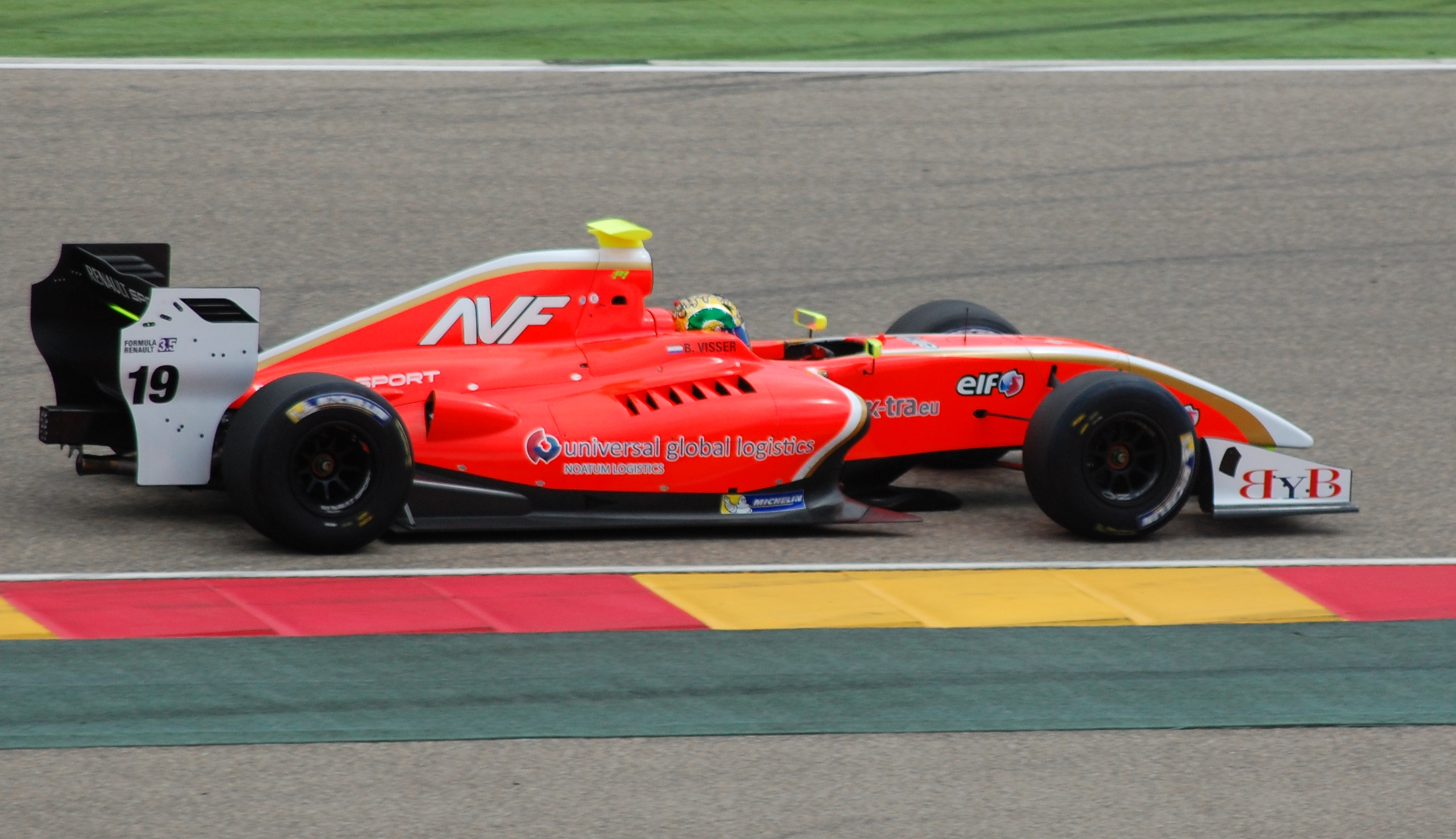
- Beitske Visser drives her Dallara T12 Formula Renault 3.5 car during the 2014 Formula Renault 3.5 Aragón round
- Category: World Series Formula V8 3.5
- Constructor: Dallara
- Designers: Luca Pignacca; Andrea Toso
- Predecessor: Dallara T08

Technical specifications
- Chassis: Carbon-fibre monocoque with honeycomb structure
- Suspension (front): Pushrods, Sachs single two-way adjustable spring-damper
- Suspension (rear): Pushrods, Sachs twin two-way adjustable spring-damper
- Length: 5,070 mm (200 in)
- Width: 1,930 mm (76 in)
- Height: 1,050 mm (41 in)
- Axle track: Front: 1,630 mm (64 in); Rear: 1,530 mm (60 in)
- Wheelbase: 3,125 mm (123 in)
- Engine: Zytek ZRS03 3,396 cc (207 cu in) V8 90° cylinder angle normally-aspirated mid-mounted
- Transmission: Ricardo 6-speed sequential semi-automatic gearbox
- Power: 530 horsepower (395 kilowatts; 537 metric horsepower); 450 newton-metres (332 pound force-feet)
- Weight: 1,358 lb (616 kg) (excluding driver); 1,523 lb (691 kg) (including driver)
- Fuel: Elf
- Lubricants: Elf
- Tyres: Michelin; O.Z. racing wheels

Competition history
- Notable entrants: All World Series Formula V8 3.5 teams
- Notable drivers: All World Series Formula V8 3.5 drivers
- Debut: 2012 Formula Renault 3.5 Aragón round
Races	Wins	Poles	F/Laps
90	90	90	90
- Constructors' Championships: 4
- Drivers' Championships: 4

The Dallara T12 or Dallara FR35-12 is a racing car developed by Italian manufacturer Dallara for use in the World Series Formula V8 3.5, a primary feeder series to Formula One originally formed from the World Series by Renault top category. The T12 is the third generation of car used by the World Series by Renault/WS Formula V8 3.5, and was introduced at Silverstone on August 24, 2011. The car was in use between 2012 and 2017.

The T12 chassis featured a new, 530 bhp (400 kW) V8 engine supplied by British firm Zytek Motorsport and designated as ZRS03. The car also featured a new gearbox developed by Ricardo and a Drag Reduction System similar to the one first used in the 2011 Formula One season. As the WS Formula V8 3.5 is a spec series, the T12 is raced by every team and driver on the grid.
