= Formula TR 2000 Pro Series =

- Category: Formula Renault 2.0
- Country: United States
- Inaugural season: 2002
- Folded: 2007
- Constructors: Tatuus
- Engine suppliers: Renault
- Last Drivers' champion: (United States) Bill Goshen
- Official website: formulatr.com

The Formula TR 2000 Pro Series was a Formula Renault 2.0 championship held in North America. This series was created in 2004 and was part of the Formula TR Pro Series that also included the Formula Renault 1.6 (FTR 1600 class) and 2.0 (FTR 2000 class).

The final championship in 2007 occurred between March 10 to November 10 and consisted of 20 rounds in United States (California, Utah and Nevada).

== History ==
The North American Formula Renault 2.0 series started in 2002 as North American Fran Am 2000 Pro Championship and took place in Canada and United States.

In 2003 an off-season championship was held in 5 race, all in Florida (Sebring, Miami-Homestead and St. Petersburg) between January 24 and February 22, 2003. The World Championship Fran Am 2000 Winter Series 2003, Florida was won by British driver Charles Hall. Then, in 2004 the winter series was named Formula Renault 2000 USA Winter Invitational and won by Dutch driver Junior Strous.

Formula TR 2000 Pro Series replaced the Fram Am series in 2004. The series was managed by the National Auto Sport Association and Paladin Motorsports and had races primarily on American west coast.

== Regulations ==
The cars used were Tatuus chassis and the 2.0 L Renault Clio engines like other Formula Renault 2.0 series. TR 2000 Pro Series used Yokohama tyres.

Points were allotted during the later seasons as following:

Pos.	1	2	3	4	5	6	7	8	9	10	11	12	13	14	15	16	17	18	19	20
Points	30	28	26	24	22	20	18	16	14	12	10	8	6	4	2	2	2	2	2	2

In each race, 1 bonus point was given for fast lap and for pole position. 1 point was also given for timely event registration.

== Champions ==
Season	Series Name	Champion	Team Champion
2002	North American Fran Am 2000 Pro Championship	(Canada) Bruno Spengler	??
2003	North American Fran Am 2000 Pro Championship	(Canada) Andrew Ranger; Charles Hall	??
2004	North American Formula Renault 2000	(Argentina) Martín Ponte	??
2004	Formula TR 2000 Pro Series	(United States) Colin Braun	??
2005	Formula TR 2000 Pro Series	(United States) Seth Ingham	
2006	Formula TR 2000 Pro Series	(United States) Carl Skerlong	
2007	Formula TR 2000 Pro Series	(United States) Bill Goshen	
