= Nelson Merlo =

Brazilian racing driver (born 1983)

- Born: 15 July 1983 (age 43) São Paulo (Brazil)

Previous series
- 2009 2006 2008 2007 2004-05 2003: GT3 Brasil Championship; Formula Three Sudamericana; Stock Car Brasil; Formula Renault 2.0 Brazil; Formula São Paulo

Championship titles
- 2008 2005 2003: Formula Three Sudamericana; Formula Renault 2.0 Brazil; Formula São Paulo

Nelson Merlo (born 15 July 1983) is a Brazilian racing driver. In 2005, he won the Brazilian Formula Renault season, taking a win in six races.

== Racing career ==
Merlo's racing career started in 1995 in Brazilian karting, where he would stay until 2003, when he moved to the Formula São Paulo circuit. He won the championship there during 2003 and 2004.

In 2005, Merlo moved to the Brazilian Formula Renault circuit and won the championship again, setting victory records in the process. He tested at Paul Ricard (France) with Formula World Series 3.5.

In 2006, Merlo moved to the South American Formula Three championship, and won the championship in 2008.

== Racing record ==
=== Career summary ===
Season	Series	Team name	Races	Poles	Wins	Podiums	F/Laps	Points	Final Placing
2003	Formula São Paulo	Phebem Fórmula	10	0	0	1	0	182	1st
2004	Formula Renault 2.0 Brazil	Bassani Racing	3	0	0	1	0	44	14th
2005	Formula Renault 2.0 Brazil	Bassani Racing	14	4	6	10	5	319	1st
2006	Formula Three Sudamericana	Piquet Sports	16	0	0	4	0	50	6th
2007	Stock Car Brasil	Bassani Racing	2	0	0	0	0	0	N/A
2008	Formula Three Sudamericana	Bassani Racing	18	2	8	13	128	0	1st
2009	GT3 Brasil Championship	Scuderia Occhi	9	0	0	0	0	22	30th

^{*} Season still in progress.

Sporting positions
Preceded by Clemente de Faria, Jr.	Formula Three Sudamericana Champion; 2008	Succeeded by Leonardo Cordeiro
