= Zytek ZRS03 engine =

Zytek-Renault ZRS03

Overview
- Manufacturer: (United Kingdom) Renault (Zytek)
- Production: 2012-present

Layout
- Configuration: 90° V8 naturally-aspirated
- Displacement: 3,396 cc (207 cu in)
- Valvetrain: DOHC

RPM range
- Max. engine speed: 9,500 rpm

Combustion
- Turbocharger: No
- Fuel system: Electronic indirect multi-point injection
- Fuel type: Elf LMS 102 RON unleaded petrol

Output
- Power output: 530 hp (395 kW) @ 8,500-9,250 rpm
- Torque output: Approx. 447 N⋅m (330 ft⋅lbf) @ 7,250 rpm

Dimensions
- Dry weight: 125 kg (276 lb)

The Zytek ZRS03 engine is a 3.4-litre normally-aspirated V8 racing engine, developed and produced by Zytek for Formula V8 3.5, a 1st-tier division series for World Series by Renault. The ZRS03's rev-limit is 9,500 rpm and produces about 530 hp (395 kW) and about 447 N⋅m (330 lb⋅ft) of torque. The ZRS03 was introduced on 24 August 2011. The ZRS03 engine runs on Elf LMS 102 RON fuel.

== Debut ==
The Zytek-Renault ZRS03's race debut was at the 2012 Aragón World Series by Renault round on 5–6 May 2012. DAMS's Arthur Pic won the inaugural pole and Nick Yelloly and Robin Frijns won the first race with the ZRS03 engine.

Starting from 2012 season, the Formula Renault 3.5 Series adopted a new engine; a 3.4-litre V8 engine producing 530 hp (395 kW) at 9,250 rpm, and 447 N⋅m (330 lb⋅ft) of torque at 7,250 rpm, developed by Zytek. The cars have 50 hp (37 kW) more than previous seasons' 3.5-litre V6 Nissan VQ35 unit, which produced 480 hp (358 kW) and had a rev limit of 8,500 rpm and was 15 kg (33 lb) heavier.

=== Applications ===
- Dallara T12
