= Bassani Racing =

(Brazil) Bassani Racing
- Founded: 2002
- Base: Itu, São Paulo
- Team principal(s): Eduardo Bassani
- Current series: F4 Brazilian Championship
- Current drivers: F4 Brazil; 26. Alexandre Machado; 33. Nelson Neto; 88. Arthur Pavie; 118. Matheus Comparatto
- Drivers' Championships: Formula Renault 2.0 Brazil; 2002. Sérgio Jimenez; 2005. Nelson Merlo; Formula 3 Sudamericana; 2008. Nelson Merlo
- Website: http://www.bassaniracing.com/

Bassani Racing (previously known as RC3 Bassani and Full Time Bassani), currently competing as Starrett Bassani, is a Brazilian professional auto racing team based in Itu, São Paulo, currently competing in the F4 Brazilian Championship, having previously competed in the Stock Car Pro Series, F3 Sudamericana, and Formula Renault 2.0.

Originally found in 2002 by Eduardo Bassani, Bassani Racing has competed in Formula 3 Sudamericana and Formula Renault 2.0 Brazil all with race winning success. The teams' first Stock Car Brasil appearance was in 2003. In 2005 team became co-ownership by Brazilian footballer Roberto Carlos as RC3 Bassani. The partnership ran until 2014. From 2017 until 2022 the team became a subsidiary of Full Time Sports and was renamed to Full Time Bassani. In 2023, the team was rebranded to Bassani Racing ahead of its debut in F4 Brazil.

== Timeline ==
Current series
Stock Car Pro Series	2003–2022
F4 Brazilian Championship	2023–present
