= Guido Falaschi =

Argentine racecar driver

Guido Martín Falaschi
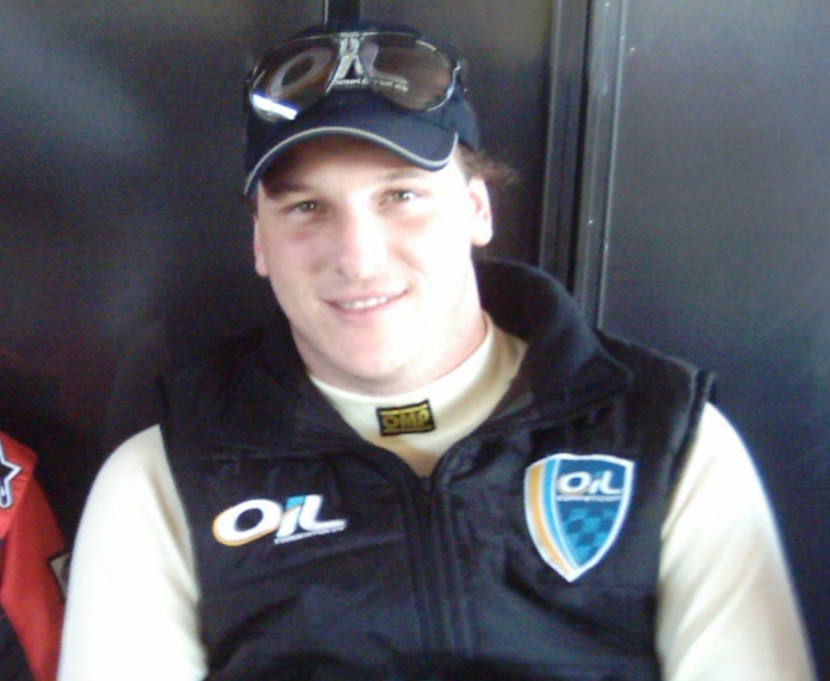
- Falaschi in 2010
- Nationality: Argentine
- Born: 1 October 1989 Las Parejas, Santa Fe
- Died: 13 November 2011 (aged 22) Balcarce, Buenos Aires

Guido Martín Falaschi (1 October 1989 – 13 November 2011) was an Argentine racecar driver.

Falaschi raced between 2005 and 2011. In 2008 won the Formula Renault Argentina championship. In Turismo Carretera and TC 2000 series he raced and won races, while in Top Race V6 he won the 2010 Copa América championship.

Falaschi died on November 13, 2011, at the age of 22 in a crash in the Turismo de Carretera race at the Autódromo Juan Manuel Fangio in Balcarce in his native Argentina's Buenos Aires.

Sporting positions
| Preceded by José María López | Top Race V6 champion 2010 | Succeeded by Agustín Canapino |
