= 2012 LATAM Challenge Series =

Seasons
- ← 2011 2013 →

The 2012 LATAM Challenge Series season is the fifth season of the LATAM Challenge Series. The season started on April 22 in Guadalajara and will finish on November 25 in Puebla. There will be nine double-header events, seven in Mexico and two in the United States (both in Texas). The defending champion Giancarlo Serenelli migrated to Auto GP and GP2.

== Drivers ==
The car will not have changes in this season. The cars were powered by 2019 cm^{3} L4 Volkswagen FSI Motors. Tatuus chassis are used. Kumho Tires supplies the tires Kumho Ecsta.

Team	Tires	No.	Driver(s)	Sponsor(s)	Rounds	Notes
(Costa Rica) A3 Energy Drink	K	3	(Costa Rica) André Solano	A3 Energy Drink	1–5	
(Costa Rica) A3 Energy Drink	K	20	(Costa Rica) James Adams	A3 Energy Drink	1–2	
(Costa Rica) A3 Energy Drink	K	99	(Mexico) Daniel Forcadell	A3 Energy Drink / Avante	2–3	Forcadell changed his team in the second round.
(Mexico) Team CSM	K	7	(Mexico) Martín Fuentes	Casino Palace	1–5	
(Mexico) Team CSM	K	9	(Mexico) Oscar Arroyo	Casino Palace	1–5	
(Mexico) Team CSM	K	30	(Mexico) Santiago Creel, Jr.	Roca Acero	2–3, 5	
(Mexico) Team CSM	K	30	(Mexico) Homero Richards	Roca Acero	4	
(Mexico) Team CSM	K	60	(Mexico) Rudy Camarillo	Roca Acero	1–4	
(Mexico) Team CSM	K	60	(Mexico) Homero Richards	Roca Acero	5	
(Mexico) RE Racing	K	2	(Mexico) Charlie Guerrero	Totis	2–4	
(Mexico) RE Racing	K	4	(Venezuela) Antonio Apicella	Mindeporte	1–5	
(Mexico) RE Racing	K	16	(Venezuela) Francisco Cerullo	Jackers	1–5	
(Mexico) RE Racing	K	37	(Brazil) Alan Chanoski	Herdez	1–5	
(Mexico) RE Racing	K	39	(Mexico) Jose Carlos Sandoval	Herdez	2–5	
(Mexico) RE Racing	K	42	(Venezuela) Gabriel Iemma	PDVSA	1–5	
(Mexico) RE Racing	K	52	(Guatemala) Sebastián Arriola	Guatemala	1–5	
(Mexico) RE Racing	K	63	(Venezuela) José E. López	Constructora VIPA	1–5	
(Mexico) Megaracing	K	99	(Mexico) Daniel Forcadell	Avante	1	
(Mexico) Megaracing	K	15	(Colombia) Juan Camilo Acosta	TBA	5	

=== Team changes ===
- A3 Energy Drink entered to series with two Costa Rican drivers, the 2009 champion André Solano and James Adams.

=== Driver changes ===
Leaving LATAM

- The three times champion, Giancarlo Serenelli, left the series to run in Auto GP World Series and GP2 Series.
- Alex Popow left the series to run in Rolex Sports Car Series.
- Diego Ferreira moved to Star Mazda Championship.
- Diego Menchaca left the series to run in Formula Renault BARC with Fortec Motorsport.

Mid-season changes

- Charlie Guerrero, son of the international driver Carlos Guerrero, debuted with RE Racing in the Round 2.

== Schedule ==
2012 venues

The 2012 schedule has two main changes; the Guadalajara and Aguascalientes races will be run, while Monterrey was dropped from the calendar.

Round		Race Title	Track	Date	Time	
Round		Race Title	Track	Date	Local	UTC
1	R1	Guadalajara	(Mexico) Autódromo Guadalajara, Guadalajara	April 22	16:28	21:28
1	R2	Guadalajara	(Mexico) Autódromo Guadalajara, Guadalajara	April 23	14:16	19:16
2	R3	San Luis Potosí	(Mexico) Autódromo San Luis 400, San Luis Potosí	May 20	14:40	19:40
2	R5	San Luis Potosí	(Mexico) Autódromo San Luis 400, San Luis Potosí	May 21	13:44	18:44
3	R5	Toluca	(Mexico) Circuito Centro Dinámico Pegaso, Toluca	June 10	14:45	19:45
3	R6	Toluca	(Mexico) Circuito Centro Dinámico Pegaso, Toluca	June 11	14:00	19:00
4	R7	Zacatecas	(Mexico) Autódromo Internacional de Zacatecas, Guadalupe	June 23	TBA	TBA
4	R8	Zacatecas	(Mexico) Autódromo Internacional de Zacatecas, Guadalupe	June 24	TBA	TBA
5	R9	Aguascalientes	(Mexico) Autódromo Internacional de Aguascalientes, Aguascalientes	July 22	TBA	TBA
5	R10	Aguascalientes	(Mexico) Autódromo Internacional de Aguascalientes, Aguascalientes	July 23	TBA	TBA
6	R11	Distrito Federal	Autódromo Hermanos Rodríguez, Mexico City	September 2	TBA	TBA
6	R12	Distrito Federal	Autódromo Hermanos Rodríguez, Mexico City	September 3	TBA	TBA
7	R13	Houston	(United States) MSR Houston, Angleton	October 14	TBA	TBA
7	R14	Houston	(United States) MSR Houston, Angleton	October 15	TBA	TBA
8	R15	Dallas	(United States) Eagles Canyon Raceway, Decatur	October 21	TBA	TBA
8	R16	Dallas	(United States) Eagles Canyon Raceway, Decatur	October 22	TBA	TBA
9	R17	Puebla	(Mexico) Autódromo Miguel E. Abed, Amozoc	November 25	TBA	TBA
9	R18	Puebla	(Mexico) Autódromo Miguel E. Abed, Amozoc	November 26	TBA	TBA

== Race results ==
Race	Race	Pole position	Fastest lap	Winner	Team
1	(Mexico) Guadalajara	(Venezuela) Francisco Cerullo	(Mexico) Rudy Camarillo	(Mexico) Rudy Camarillo	(Mexico) Team CSM
2	(Mexico) Guadalajara		(Venezuela) Francisco Cerullo	(Venezuela) Francisco Cerullo	(Mexico) RE Racing
3	(Mexico) San Luis Potosí	(Mexico) Rudy Camarillo	(Venezuela) Francisco Cerullo	(Costa Rica) André Solano	(Costa Rica) A3 Energy Drink
4	(Mexico) San Luis Potosí		(Mexico) Martín Fuentes	(Mexico) Martín Fuentes	(Mexico) Team CSM
5	(Mexico) Toluca	(Mexico) Rudy Camarillo	(Mexico) Rudy Camarillo	(Mexico) Rudy Camarillo	(Mexico) Team CSM
6	(Mexico) Toluca			(Mexico) Juan Carlos Sandoval	(Mexico) RE Racing
7	(Mexico) Zacatecas	(Venezuela) Francisco Cerullo	(Costa Rica) André Solano	(Venezuela) Francisco Cerullo	(Mexico) RE Racing
8	(Mexico) Zacatecas			(Brazil) Alan Chanoski	(Mexico) RE Racing
9	(Mexico) Aguascalientes	(Costa Rica) André Solano	(Venezuela) Francisco Cerullo	(Costa Rica) André Solano	(Costa Rica) A3 Energy Drink
10	(Mexico) Aguascalientes			(Mexico) Juan Carlos Sandoval	(Mexico) RE Racing

== Race summaries ==
=== Round 1: Guadalajara Grand Challenge ===
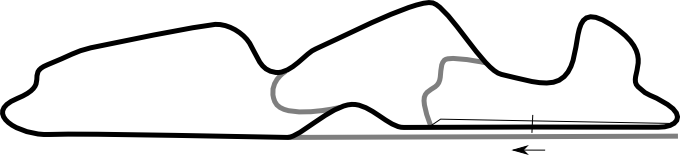
Autódromo de Guadalajara

The season started in Autódromo Guadalajara. Rudy Camarillo won the first event (37:05.531, 121.05 km/h). In the second lap, Gabriel Iemma and Sebastián Arriola have a crash, both failed to continue the race. Francisco Cerullo finished in second place 2.964 seconds behind. Martín Fuentes in third place, 8.230 seconds behind Camarillo. The second race, the Venezuelan driver Francisco Cerullo took his maiden victory in the series (37:01.820, 121.25 km/h). Cerullo suffered a puncture in the last lap, but he drove to finished ahead by 5 seconds. The podium again was conformed by Camarillo and Fuentes. Camarillo and Cerullo shared the lead of the championship with 52 points.

Race 1
Pos	Grid	No.	Driver	Team	Laps	Time
1	2	60	(Mexico) Rudy Camarillo	(Mexico) Team CSM	31	37:05.532
2	1	16	(Venezuela) Francisco Cerullo	(Mexico) RE Racing	31	+2.964
3	3	7	(Mexico) Martín Fuentes	(Mexico) Team CSM	31	+8.230
Race average speed: 121.05 km/h
Lap Chart

Race 2
Pos	Grid	No.	Driver	Team	Laps	Time
1	7	16	(Venezuela) Francisco Cerullo	(Mexico) RE Racing	31	37:01.820
2	8	60	(Mexico) Rudy Camarillo	(Mexico) Team CSM	31	+ 5.220
3	6	7	(Mexico) Martín Fuentes	(Mexico) Team CSM	31	+21.790
Race average speed: 121.25 km/h
Lap Chart

=== Round 2: San Luis Potosí Grand Challenge ===
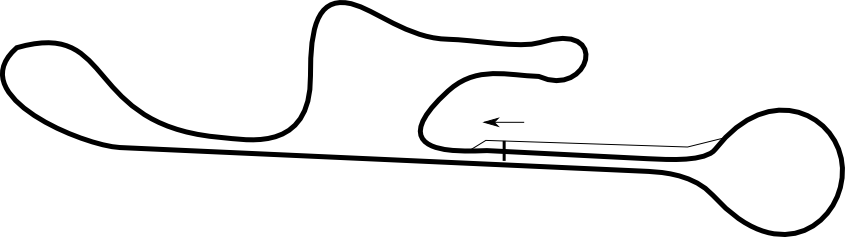
San Luis 400 racetrack

The second race took place in the Autódromo San Luis 400 in Tangamanga Park. Rudy Camarillo started in pole position. He took the lead for more than half of the race, but in the final laps was reversed by André Solano (38:39.519, 117.02 km/h), who finished in first place. Martín Fuentes came in third place, for third time in a row. James Adams had a crash with Francisco Cerullo leaving the Adams' car rear suspension broken. Camarillo accumulated 78 points, 8 ahead of Francisco Cerullo, who set the fastest lap. The second race Martín Fuentes took the lead after yellow flag (39:49.352, 109.68 km/h). Camarillo saw reduced his advantage over Cerullo to only 2 points.

Race 1
Pos	Grid	No.	Driver	Team	Laps	Time
1	2	3	(Costa Rica) André Solano	(Costa Rica) A3 Energy Drink	29	38:39.519
2	1	60	(Mexico) Rudy Camarillo	(Mexico) Team CSM	29	+ 0.878
3	4	7	(Mexico) Martín Fuentes	(Mexico) Team CSM	29	+1.431
Race average speed: 117.02 km/h
Lap Chart

Race 2
Pos	Grid	No.	Driver	Team	Laps	Time
1	6	7	(Mexico) Martín Fuentes	(Mexico) Team CSM	28	39:49.352
2	5	16	(Venezuela) Francisco Cerullo	(Mexico) RE Racing	28	+ 0.832
3	7	60	(Mexico) Rudy Camarillo	(Mexico) Team CSM	28	+1.963
Race average speed: 109.68 km/h
Lap Chart

=== Round 3: Toluca Grand Challenge ===
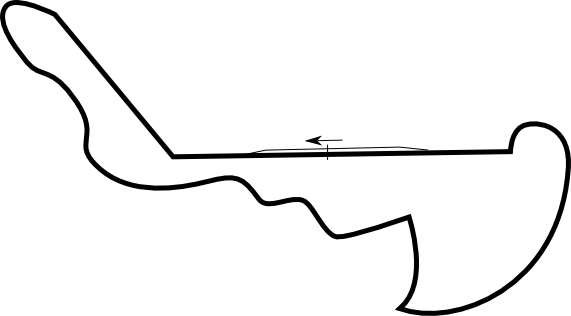
CDP racetrack

The third round will be raced in the Circuito Centro Dinámico Pegaso, in Toluca. The Team CSM's driver Rudy Camarillo took the pole with lap record (0:58.965 119.05 km/h). José Carlos Sandoval will start in the front row. Rudy Camarillo won the first race leading all of the race. Juan Carlos Sandoval finished in second place followed by André Solano. Cerullo, the second in the championship, had an accident and lost positions finished in tenth place. In the race two, Martín Fuentes get the reversed pole, led the race until the lap 13. When Fuentes made a mistake, and fell to 7th place. Juan Carlos Sandoval reached the first place and won his first race in the season. Francisco Cerullo finished in second place and André Solano in third. After the third weekend, Rudy Camarillo stays in the top 22 points ahead of Francisco Cerullo.

Race 1
Pos	Grid	No.	Driver	Team	Laps	Time
1	1	60	(Mexico) Rudy Camarillo	(Mexico) Team CSM	34	38:29.271
2	2	39	(Mexico) Juan Carlos Sandoval	(Mexico) RE Racing	34	+2.561
3	6	3	(Costa Rica) André Solano	(Costa Rica) A3 Energy Drink	34	+4.714
Race average speed: 103.35 km/h
Lap Chart

Race 2
Pos	Grid	No.	Driver	Team	Laps	Time
1	7	39	(Mexico) Juan Carlos Sandoval	(Mexico) RE Racing	35	35:09.521
2	10	16	(Venezuela) Francisco Cerullo	(Mexico) RE Racing	35	+3.486
3	6	3	(Costa Rica) André Solano	(Costa Rica) A3 Energy Drink	35	+26.001
Race average speed: 116.47 km/h
Lap Chart

=== Round 4: Zacatecas Grand Challenge ===
Zacatecas International Racetrack

The fourth round of the season will be in Zacatecas. The 2.04 km of length will be used.

Race 1
Pos	Grid	No.	Driver	Team	Laps	Time
1	1	16	(Venezuela) Francisco Cerullo	(Mexico) RE Racing	41	39:51.114
2	2	3	(Costa Rica) André Solano	(Costa Rica) A3 Energy Drink	41	+0.271
3	8	60	(Mexico) Rudy Camarillo	(Mexico) Team CSM	41	+8.203
Race average speed: 125.92 km/h
Lap Chart

Race 2
Pos	Grid	No.	Driver	Team	Laps	Time
1	9	37	(Brazil) Alan Chanoski	(Mexico) RE Racing	40	
2	11	52	(Guatemala) Sebastián Arriola	(Mexico) RE Racing	40	
3	10	4	(Venezuela) Antonio Apicella	(Mexico) RE Racing	40	
Race average speed
Lap Chart

== Championship standings ==
Rank	Driver	(Mexico) GDL		(Mexico) SLP		(Mexico) TOL		(Mexico) ZAC		(Mexico) OAM		(Mexico) AHR		(United States) MSR	(United States) ECR	(Mexico) PUE	Pts
1	(Venezuela) Francisco Cerullo	2	1	4	2	10	2	1	10	3	2						188
2	(Costa Rica) André Solano	4	Ret	1	Ret	3	3	2	7	1	3						162
3	(Mexico) Rudy Camarillo	1	2	2	3	1	6	3	12								156
4	(Mexico) Jose Carlos Sandoval			5	10	2	1	4	8	4	1						120
5	(Mexico) Martín Fuentes	3	3	3	1	8	4	7	5	11	10						116
6	(Brazil) Alan Chanoski	10	6	6	5	11	7	9	1	5	5						86
7	(Guatemala) Sebastián Arriola	9	9	7	4	6	8	11	2	9	6						72
8	(Venezuela) Antonio Apicella	8	7	Ret	11	4	5	10	3	13	7						62
9	(Venezuela) Gabriel Iemma	Ret	5	11	6	5	9	5	11	6	8						58
10	(Mexico) Homero Richards							12	9	2	4						38
11	(Mexico) Oscar Arroyo	6	10	8	9	13	10	6	6	10	9						38
12	(Costa Rica) James Adams	5	4	Ret	7												30
13	(Mexico) Charlie Guerrero			Ret	Ret	7	12	8	4	Ret	Ret	9	7				26
14	(Mexico) Daniel Forcadell	7	11	10	8	9	11										16
15	(Venezuela) José E. López	Ret	8	DNS	Ret	12	14	13	13	7	12						12
16	(Mexico) Santiago Creel, Jr.			9	12	14	13			8	11						10
	(Colombia) Juan Camilo Acosta									12	13						0
References																	

Points are awarded to drivers on the following basis (regardless of whether the car is running at the end of the race):

Position	1	2	3	4	5	6	7	8	9	10
Saturday race Points	30	24	20	16	12	10	8	6	4	2
Sunday race Points	24	20	16	12	10	8	6	4	2	0

Bonus points:

- 2 for Fastest Lap
- 2 for Pole Position
