= List of auto racing tracks in Mexico =

This is a list of auto racing tracks in Mexico. The number of turns and track length are based on the standard, full courses for each track. The major series in bold listed are currently hold a race at the track.

defunct
not yet completed

== Ovals ==
Track	City	State	Opened	Major series	Length	Layout
Autódromo Chiapas	Berriozábal	Chiapas	2008	**NMS**	0.750 mi (1.207 km)	
Autódromo El Dorado	Aldama	Chihuahua	2012	**NMS**	0.625 mi (1.006 km)	
Autódromo Hermanos Rodriguez	Mexico City	Distrito Federal	1962	**NMS**	1.000 mi (1.609 km)	
Autódromo Miguel E. Abed	Amozoc	Puebla	2005	**NMS**	1.280 mi (2.060 km)	
Autódromo Monterrey	Apodaca	Nuevo León	1970	NMS	1.000 mi (1.609 km)	
Autódromo Potosino	Zaragoza	San Luis Potosí	2005	**NMS**	0.500 mi (0.805 km)	
Autódromo de Querétaro	El Marqués	Querétaro	2009	**NMS**	0.797 mi (1.283 km)	
Ovalo Aguascalientes México	Aguascalientes	Aguascalientes	2009	**NMS**	0.875 mi (1.408 km)	
Trióvalo Internacional de Cajititlán	Guadalajara	Jalisco	1986	NMS	0.857 mi (1.379 km)	

== Road courses ==
Track	City	State	Opened	Major series	Length	Turns	Layout
Autodromo Bosques del Angel	Tulancingo	Hidalgo	1988		1.430 km (0.889 mi)	11	
Autódromo Chiapas	Berriozábal	Chiapas	2008	LATAM	2.010 km (1.249 mi)	12	
Autódromo de León	León	Guanajuato	1976	WRC, NMS	1.210 km (0.752 mi)	4	
Autódromo del Águila	Lagunillas	Michoacán	2005	Panam GP, LATAM	1.921 km (1.194 mi)	10	
Autódromo Francisco Villa	Chihuahua City	Chihuahua	?		2.840 km (1.765 mi)	7	
Autódromo Gómez Palacio	Dinamita	Durango	1978	NTS, CARS MX, MOTOAGP	1.500 km (0.932 mi)	7	
Autódromo Hermanos Rodriguez	Mexico City	Distrito Federal	1962	**F1**, WSC, CART, NASCAR Nationwide Series, Panam GP, LATAM, **NACAM F4**, **Formula E**	4.304 km (2.674 mi)	17	
Autodromo Internacional de Cancún	Cancún	Quintana Roo	1991	NACAM F4	1.534 km (0.953 mi)	13	
Autódromo Miguel E. Abed	Amozoc	Puebla	2005	WTCC, **NMS**, Panam GP, LATAM, **NACAM F4**, Formula E	3.363 km (2.090 mi)	16	
Autódromo Moisés Solana	Epazoyucan	Hidalgo	1988		1.750 km (1.087 mi)	7	
Autódromo Monterrey	Apodaca	Nuevo León	1970	**NMS**, Panam GP, LATAM, **NACAM F4**	3.200 km (1.988 mi)	15	
Autódromo San Luis 400	San Luis Potosí	San Luis Potosí	1992	NTS, Panam GP, LATAM	2.300 km (1.429 mi)	13	
Autódromo Yucatán	Progreso	Yucatán	2017	NACAM F4	3.340 km (2.075 mi)	17	
Circuito Centro Dinámico Pegaso	Toluca	State of Mexico	2011	LATAM, NACAM F4	2.070 km (1.286 mi)	14	
EcoCentro Expositor Querétaro	El Marqués	Querétaro	2009	**NMS**, LATAM, **NACAM F4**	2.314 km (1.438 mi)	10	
Óvalo Aguascalientes México	Aguascalientes	Aguascalientes	2009	NMS, LATAM, NACAM F4	1.800 km (1.118 mi)	9	
Autódromo de Querétaro	El Marqués	Querétaro	1985		1.987 km (1.235 mi)	6	
Autódromo Gerardo Dominico Martinez	Saltillo	Coahuila	1989	SCCA Escort World Challenge	2.300 km (1.429 mi)	11	
Autódromo Guadalajara	Guadalajara	Jalisco	1998	Panam GP, LATAM	2.414 km (1.500 mi)	16	
Autódromo Hermanos Gallo	Guadalajara	Jalisco	?		1.100 km (0.684 mi)	8	
Autódromo Internacional de la Jolla	Ciudad Juárez	Chihuahua	1991		3.540 km (2.200 mi)	20	
Autódromo Internacional de Zacatecas	Zacatecas	Zacatecas	?	Panam GP, LATAM	1.851 km (1.150 mi)	8	
Autódromo Pablo Gutiérrez Arcos	Aguascalientes	Aguascalientes	1979		4.104 km (2.550 mi)	12	
Autódromo Super Jarocho	Veracruz	Veracruz	?		2.500 km (1.553 mi)	10	

== Temporary circuits ==
Track	City	State	Opened	Major series	Length	Turns	Layout
Circuito de las Américas	Cancún	Quintana Roo	1991	Mexican F3	1.700 km (1.056 mi)	12	
Circuito "T" Adatiz	Atizapán	State of Mexico	1998	Mexican F3	1.800 km (1.118 mi)	9	
Fundidora Park	Monterrey	Nuevo León	2001	CART, A1GP	3.390 km (2.106 mi)	15	
Hipódromo de la Condesa	Mexico City	Distrito Federal					

== Drag strips ==
Track	City	State	Opened	Surface	Major series	Length
Autódromo Guadalajara	Guadalajara	Jalisco	1998		National Championship, North Championship	0.250 mi (0.402 km)
Autódromo Monterrey	Apodaca	Nuevo León	1970		National Championship, North Championship	0.250 mi (0.402 km)

== By state ==
State	Racetracks	Road courses	Ovals	Drag strips
Aguascalientes	2	1	1	0
(Chihuahua (state)) Chihuahua	5	4	1	0
Durango	1	1	0	0
Guanajuato	1	1	0	0
Jalisco	5	3	1	1
(Mexico City) México City	1	1	0	0
Nuevo León	2	1	0	1
Puebla	1	1	1	0
Querétaro	2	2	0	0
San Luis Potosí	2	1	1	0
Zacatecas	1	1	0	0
