= 2011 LATAM Challenge Series =

Seasons
- ← 2010 2012 →

2011 LATAM Challenge Series season was the fourth season of LATAM Challenge Series. The season started on April 9, and finished on November 20. There was nine double events, seven in Mexico and two in USA (both in Texas). The Venezuelan driver Giancarlo Serenelli retained the championship with seven victories in the season. He also runs in Super Copa Telcel.

== Cars ==
For this season the cars were powered by 2019 cm^{3} L4 Volkswagen FSI Motors. Tatuus chassis are used. Kumho Tires supplies the tires.

== Drivers ==
Team	Tires	No.	Driver(s)	Sponsor(s)	Rounds	Notes
Megaracing	K	11	(Mexico) Alfonso Celis Jr.		1–2, 5	
Megaracing	K	15	(Venezuela) Gabriel Iemma		1–6	
Ram racing	K	17	(Venezuela) Alex Popow	Avior Airlines	All	
Ram racing	K	23	(Mexico) Juan Pablo Sierra	Estrella Roja	1, 2, 4, 6–9	
Re Racing	K	13	(Mexico) Diego Menchaca	GMI		
Re Racing	K	16	(Mexico) Diego Ferreira	Gobierno de Aragua		
Re Racing	K	22	(Mexico) Gerardo Nieto	Gas Express Nieto		
Re Racing	K	45	(Venezuela) Giancarlo Serenelli	PDVSA		
Re Racing	K	55	(Mexico) Christopher Ramirez	Kola Loka		
Re Racing	K	57	(Venezuela) Francisco Cerullo	Jackers		
Team CSM	K	7	(Mexico) Martin Fuentes	El palacio de los numeros	1–2	
Team CSM	K	9	(Mexico) Oscar Paredes Arroyo	El palacio de los numeros	1–2	
Team CSM	K	60	(Mexico) Rudy Camarillo	Rocacero	1–2	
Urban racing	K	18	(Mexico) David Farias	Daewoo		

== Schedule ==
2011 venues

The 2011 schedule was presented in February. LATAM ran in the Autódromo Hermanos Rodríguez for first time, and returned to Texas for two races. On May 25, LATAM organization announced a change in the third race from Tuxtla Gutiérrez to Toluca by the track conditions.

Round		Race title	Track	Date
1	R1	Puebla	(Mexico) Autódromo Miguel E. Abed, Amozoc	April 9
1	R2	Puebla	(Mexico) Autódromo Miguel E. Abed, Amozoc	April 10
2	R1	Monterrey	(Mexico) Autódromo Monterrey, Apodaca	May 7
2	R2	Monterrey	(Mexico) Autódromo Monterrey, Apodaca	May 8
3	R1	Toluca	(Mexico) Circuito Centro Dinámico Pegaso, Toluca	June 11
3	R2	Toluca	(Mexico) Circuito Centro Dinámico Pegaso, Toluca	June 12
4	R1	Distrito Federal	Autódromo Hermanos Rodríguez, Mexico City	July 2
4	R2	Distrito Federal	Autódromo Hermanos Rodríguez, Mexico City	July 3
5	R1	San Luis Potosí	(Mexico) Autódromo Tangamanga II, San Luis Potosí	July 30
5	R2	San Luis Potosí	(Mexico) Autódromo Tangamanga II, San Luis Potosí	July 31
6	R1	Dallas	(United States) Eagles Canyon Raceway, Decatur	September 10
6	R2	Dallas	(United States) Eagles Canyon Raceway, Decatur	September 11
7	R1	Houston	(United States) MSR Houston, Angleton	September 17
7	R2	Houston	(United States) MSR Houston, Angleton	September 18
8	R1	Querétaro	(Mexico) Autódromo de Querétaro, El Marqués	October 29
8	R2	Querétaro	(Mexico) Autódromo de Querétaro, El Marqués	October 30
9	R1	Puebla	(Mexico) Autódromo Miguel E. Abed, Amozoc	November 19
9	R2	Puebla	(Mexico) Autódromo Miguel E. Abed, Amozoc	November 20

== Results ==
=== Races ===
No.		Race	Pole position	Fastest lap	Winner	Team
1	R1	(Mexico) Puebla	(Mexico) Rudy Camarillo	(Mexico) Martín Fuentes	(Mexico) Martín Fuentes	(Mexico) Team CSM
1	R2	(Mexico) Puebla		(Mexico) Rudy Camarillo	(Mexico) Rudy Camarillo	(Mexico) Team CSM
2	R1	(Mexico) Monterrey	(Mexico) Rudy Camarillo	(Mexico) Rudy Camarillo	(Mexico) Rudy Camarillo	(Mexico) Team CSM
2	R2	(Mexico) Monterrey		(Mexico) Rudy Camarillo	(Mexico) Rudy Camarillo	(Mexico) Team CSM
3	R1	(Mexico) Toluca	(Mexico) Gerardo Nieto	??	(Mexico) Rudy Camarillo	(Mexico) Team CSM
3	R2	(Mexico) Toluca		??	(Mexico) Rudy Camarillo	(Mexico) Team CSM
4	R1	Mexico City	(Mexico) David Farias	??	(Mexico) Rudy Camarillo	(Mexico) Team CSM
4	R2	Mexico City		??	(Mexico) Gerardo Nieto	(Mexico) Team Re Racing
5	R1	(Mexico) San Luis Potosí	(Mexico) Sebastían Ramírez	??	(Mexico) Rudy Camarillo	(Mexico) Team CSM
5	R2	(Mexico) San Luis Potosí		??	(Venezuela) Giancarlo Serenelli	(Mexico) Team Re Racing
6	R1	(United States) Dallas	(Mexico) Rudy Camarillo	(Venezuela) Giancarlo Serenelli	(Venezuela) Giancarlo Serenelli	(Mexico) Team Re Racing
6	R2	(United States) Dallas		(Venezuela) Giancarlo Serenelli	(Mexico) Homero Richards	(Mexico) Team Re Racing
7	R1	(United States) Houston	(Mexico) Diego Menchaca	(Venezuela) Giancarlo Serenelli	(Venezuela) Giancarlo Serenelli	(Mexico) Team Re Racing
7	R2	(United States) Houston		(Venezuela) Giancarlo Serenelli	(Venezuela) Giancarlo Serenelli	(Mexico) Team Re Racing
8	R1	(Mexico) Querétaro	(Mexico) Rudy Camarillo	??	(Venezuela) Giancarlo Serenelli	(Mexico) Team Re Racing
8	R2	(Mexico) Querétaro		??	(Venezuela) Giancarlo Serenelli	(Mexico) Team Re Racing

== Race summaries ==
=== Round 1: Puebla Grand Challenge ===
Lap Chart Race 1	Lap Chart Race 2

== Standings ==
Rank	Driver	(Mexico) PUE		(Mexico) MTY		(Mexico) TOL		(Mexico) MEX		(Mexico) SLP		(United States) DAL		(United States) HOU		(Mexico) QRO		(Mexico) PUE		Pts
Rank	Driver	R1	R2	R1	R2	R1	R2	R1	R2	R1	R2	R1	R2	R1	R2	R1	R2	R1	R2	Pts
1	(Mexico) Rudy Camarillo	2	1	1	1	1	1	1	6	1	4	3	8	4	2	11	3	4		298
2	(Mexico) Martín Fuentes	1	2	6	4	10	2	2	2	3	6	2	2	9	4	4	9	6		202
3	(Venezuela) Giancarlo Serenelli	7	3	7	3	12	13	8	11	5	1	1	9	1	1	1	1	1		166
4	(Mexico) Diego Menchaca	4	4	5	5	7	3	9	15	6	11	4	5	3	5	3	11	7		132
5	(Venezuela) Francisco Cerullo	5	9	10	7	2	5	5	7	8	2	9	3	7	3	5	5	5		126
6	(Mexico) Christopher Ramirez	9	13	3	10	11	7	4	4	7	3			2	6	2	4	2		116
7	(Venezuela) Alex Popow		8	4	2	3	12	7	3	2	7	11	6	10		8	2	3		108
8	(Mexico) Gerardo Nieto	3	5	2	9	9	4	6	1											90
9	(Mexico) David Farias	13	12	8	6	6	6	3	5	4	5					7	10	8		80
10	(Venezuela) Diego Ferreira	6	7	9	13	4	8	10	14			5	4	8	7	10	6	9		74
11	(Mexico) Juan Pablo Sierra	12	6	13	8			13	9			6	7	5	8	6	7	16		36
12	(Mexico) Oscar P. Arroyo	8	10	12	12	5	10	11	10	12	9	8	10	6	11	9	8	12		30
13	(Mexico) Homero Richards									14	13	7	1							28
14	(Mexico) Hugo Oliveras											10	12	12	12					10
15	(Mexico) Gabriel Iemma	11		11	11	8	9	14	8	10	12		11					14		8
16	(Mexico) Alfonso Celis Jr.	10	11	14						9	10									6
17	(Mexico) Sebastian Ramírez									11	8									2
18	(Mexico) Victor Alfaro					13	11	15	13	13	14							15		0
19	(Mexico) Jorge Cevallos							12	16											0
20	(Mexico) Santiago Tovar								12											0
21	(Guatemala) Sebastian Arriola													11	9			13		0
	(Mexico) Andrés Gutiérrez																	10		0
	(Mexico) Jose Carlos Sandoval																	11		0
References																				

Point scoring system:

- Points are awarded based on each driver's resulting place (regardless of whether the car is running at the end of the race):

Position	1	2	3	4	5	6	7	8	9	10
Saturday race Points	30	24	20	16	12	10	8	6	4	2
Sunday race Points	20	16	12	10	8	6	4	2	0	0

Bonus points:

- 2 for Fastest Lap
- 2 for Pole Position
