= 2012 Super Copa Telcel =

Seasons
- ← 2011 2013 →

The 2012 Super Copa Telcel was the second season of this championship, part of the Mexican branch of SEAT León Supercopa. Reigning champion Ricardo Pérez de Lara won the series for a second time. Trofeo Ibiza was a supported event running SEAT Ibiza Cupra Turbo 1.4L.

== Cars ==
All the cars were SEAT Leon FWD.

Engine	4 cylinders turbocharged
Displacement	1984 cc
Power	301 HP
Torque	340 Nm @ N/A
Gearbox	DSG 6 speed
Length	4.6 m

- Continental supplied the tires.

== Drivers ==
In this year is expect to increase to 20 cars respect the 16 of the 2011 season. Rubén Rovelo, Marco Santibáñez, Gabriel Iemma, César Tiberio Jiménez and Alfonso Celis have confirmed their participation.

Team	No.	Sponsor	Driver	Rounds
Junker/RPL Racing	1	Telmex-Benotto	(Mexico) Ricardo Pérez de Lara	1–3
Junker/RPL Racing	2		(Mexico) Eduardo de León	1–3
Junker/RPL Racing	22		(Mexico) Rogelio German	1–3
Team Venezuela by RAM Racing	15	Venezuela	(Venezuela) Juan Carlos Alvarez	1–3
Team Venezuela by RAM Racing	16	Venezuela	(Venezuela) Andrés Racioppi	1, 3
Team Venezuela by RAM Racing	16	Venezuela	(Venezuela) Alex Racioppi	2, 3
Team Venezuela by RAM Racing	42	Venezuela	(Venezuela) Gabriel Iemma	1, 3
Orangino by Fili	T44	FICREA	(Mexico) César Tiberio Jiménez	1–3
Orangino by Fili	3	FICREA	(Mexico) Eduardo Goeters	2–3
HTM	5		(Mexico) Rubén Rovelo	1
HTM	11		(Mexico) Alfonso Celis	1–2
HTM	11		(Mexico) Oscar Hidalgo	3
Tiger Racing Team	35		(Mexico) Irán Sánchez	1–3
Drako Racing	30		(Mexico) Alexis Uribe	1
Drako Racing	30		(Mexico) Oscar Uribe	2
	18		(Mexico) Marco Santibañez	3
	44z		(Mexico) Santos Zanella	1–3
	48		(Mexico) Andrés Orea	1–3

== Schedule ==
Round		Race	Track	Date
1	R1	Guadalajara	(Jalisco) Autódromo Guadalajara, Guadalajara	April 22
1	R2	Guadalajara	(Jalisco) Autódromo Guadalajara, Guadalajara	April 22
2	R3	Monterrey	(Nuevo León) Autódromo Monterrey, Apodaca	May 6
2	R4	Monterrey	(Nuevo León) Autódromo Monterrey, Apodaca	May 6
3	R5	Aguascalientes	Óvalo Aguascalientes México, Aguascalientes	June 3
3	R6	Aguascalientes	Óvalo Aguascalientes México, Aguascalientes	June 3
4	R7	Zacatecas	Autódromo de Zacatecas, Zacatecas	July 15
4	R8	Zacatecas	Autódromo de Zacatecas, Zacatecas	July 15
5	R9	Pachuca	(Hidalgo (state)) Autódromo Moisés Solana, Mineral de la Reforma	August 5
5	R10	Pachuca	(Hidalgo (state)) Autódromo Moisés Solana, Mineral de la Reforma	August 5
6	R11	Mexico City	Autódromo Hermanos Rodríguez, Mexico City	September 2
6	R12	Mexico City	Autódromo Hermanos Rodríguez, Mexico City	September 2
7	R13	San Luis Potosí	Autódromo San Luis 400, San Luis Potosí	September 23
7	R14	San Luis Potosí	Autódromo San Luis 400, San Luis Potosí	September 23
8	R15	Querétaro	Autódromo de Querétaro, El Marqués	October 7
8	R16	Querétaro	Autódromo de Querétaro, El Marqués	October 7
9	R17	Puebla	(Puebla) Autódromo Miguel E. Abed, Amozoc	November 4
9	R18	Puebla	(Puebla) Autódromo Miguel E. Abed, Amozoc	November 4

=== Calendar changes ===
- Guadalajara and Aguascalientes will be venue for races for first time.

== Results ==
=== Races ===
Race	Race name	Pole position	Fastest lap	Winner
1	Guadalajara	(Mexico) Ricardo Pérez de Lara	(Mexico) Ricardo Pérez de Lara	(Mexico) Ricardo Pérez de Lara
2	Guadalajara	(Venezuela) Juan Carlos Álvarez ^{1}	(Mexico) Ricardo Pérez de Lara	(Mexico) César Tiberio Jiménez
3	Monterrey	(Mexico) Ricardo Pérez de Lara	(Mexico) Eduardo Goeters	(Mexico) César Tiberio Jiménez
4	Monterrey	(Mexico) Santos Zanella ^{1}	(Mexico) Ricardo Pérez de Lara	(Mexico) Ricardo Pérez de Lara
5	Aguascalientes	(Mexico) Ricardo Pérez de Lara	(Mexico) Ricardo Pérez de Lara	(Mexico) Ricardo Pérez de Lara
6	Aguascalientes	(Mexico) Andrés Orea ^{1}	(Mexico) Ricardo Pérez de Lara	(Mexico) Rogelio Germán

- ^1 The 8th place in the first race is the pole position in the second race.

=== Standings ===
Rank	Driver	GDL		MTY		AGS		ZAC	PAC	MXC	SLP	QRO	PUE	Pts
1	(Mexico) Ricardo Pérez de Lara	1	5	2	1	1	2							552
2	(Mexico) César Tiberio Jiménez	3	1	1	4	4	6							502
3	(Mexico) Rogelio Germán	7	13	4	5	3	1							459
4	(Mexico) Santos Zanella	4	12	8	2	6	10							434
5	(Mexico) Eduardo de León	6	6	6	11	12	5							411
6	(Venezuela) Juan Carlos Alvárez	8	10	10	10	5	11							403
7	(Mexico) Irán Sánchez	13	11	7	8	10	8							399
8	(Mexico) Andrés Orea	14	7	9	6	8	13							399
9	(Mexico) Alfonso Celis	5	3	3	5									306
10	(Mexico) Eduardo Goeters			5	3	14	14							278
11	(Venezuela) Alex Racioppi			11	9		4							208
12	(Venezuela) Andrés Racioppi	12	9			7								200
13	(Mexico) Marco Santibañez	10				9	9							200
14	(Venezuela) Gabriel Iemma	9	14			13	7							198
15	(Mexico) Alexis Uribe	11	8											196
16	(Mexico) Rubén Rovelo	2	2											180
17	(Mexico) Oscar Hidalgo					2	3							172
18	(Mexico) Oscar Uribe					11	12							129
18	(Mexico) Rubén Pardo		4											76
References														
