= 2008 LATAM Challenge Series =

Open-wheel racing series

Seasons
- ← 2007 2009 →

2008 LATAM Challenge Series season was the first season of this championship. LATAM Challenge Series replaced the Formula Renault 2000 de America.

Giancarlo Serenelli was crowned as the inaugural series champion.

== Drivers ==
Team	No.	Driver	Rounds
R/E Racing	1	(Mexico) Gerardo Nieto	All
R/E Racing	7	(Mexico) Martín Fuentes	All
R/E Racing	8	(Mexico) David Farías	All
R/E Racing	9	(Mexico) Óscar Paredes Arroyo	1–7
R/E Racing	19	(Mexico) Santiago Tovar	1
R/E Racing	45	(Venezuela) Giancarlo Serenelli	All
Team Costa Rica	3	(Costa Rica) André Solano	All
Team Costa Rica	4	(Costa Rica) Javier Collado	1–6
Team Costa Rica	80	(Costa Rica) José Andrés Montalto	1–2
Dynamic Motorsports	4	(Mexico) Enrique Vázquez	3, 6
Dynamic Motorsports	4	(Mexico) Daniel Morales	4–6
Dynamic Motorsports	5	(Mexico) Javier Echevarría	1–4
Dynamic Motorsports	6	(Mexico) Enrique Baca	7–8

== Results ==
=== Standings ===
Rank	Driver	PUE		MOR		SLP		QRO		ZAC		GDL		CHI		MTY		Pts
Rank	Driver	R1	R2	R1	R2	R1	R2	R1	R2	R1	R2	R1	R2	R1	R2	R1	R2	Pts
1	(Venezuela) Giancarlo Serenelli	1	1	1	1	8	9	4	18	2	3	1	1	3	3	1	2	362
2	(Costa Rica) André Solano	4	6	8	15	12	6	20	7	3	2	10	10	1	1	3	1	226
3	(Mexico) Gerardo Nieto	8	9	2	13	2	17	18	19	6	8	5	3	9	2	2	4	180
4	(Mexico) David Farías	2	3	7	4	9	3	5	10	7	5	17	14	2	11	7	7	156
5	(Mexico) Hugo Oliveras					1	2	1	2	1	16	11	15					152
6	(Costa Rica) Javier Collado	7	2	4	3	3	4	2	3	17	17	13	16					148
7	(Mexico) Carlos Arellano	12	4	13	5	15	7	19	4	10	6	8	2	8	5			126
8	(Mexico) Homero Richards					4	1	3	1	15	1	DSQ	18					100
9	(Mexico) Juan Carlos Sistos	5	14	5	8	11	12	12	13	18	4	2	4	4	6			96
10	(Guatemala) Juan Pablo Glover	6	7	10	6	5	13	6	9	8	13	3	7					94
