= 2010 LATAM Challenge Series =

Seasons
- ← 2009 2011 →

2010 LATAM Challenge Series season was the third season of LATAM Challenge Series.

Giancarlo Serenelli was crowned the season's champion.

== Schedule ==
2010 venues

Round		Race title	Track	Date
1	R1	Puebla	(Mexico) Autódromo Miguel E. Abed, Amozoc	April 10
1	R2	Puebla	(Mexico) Autódromo Miguel E. Abed, Amozoc	April 11
2	R1	Tuxtla Gutiérrez	(Mexico) Autódromo Chiapas, Berriozábal	April 16
2	R2	Tuxtla Gutiérrez	(Mexico) Autódromo Chiapas, Berriozábal	April 17
3	R1	Monterrey	(Mexico) Autódromo Monterrey, Apodaca	May 15
3	R2	Monterrey	(Mexico) Autódromo Monterrey, Apodaca	May 16
4	R1	Chihuahua	(Mexico) Autódromo de La Cantera, Chihuahua	June 12
4	R2	Chihuahua	(Mexico) Autódromo de La Cantera, Chihuahua	June 13
5	R1	San Luis Potosí	(Mexico) Autódromo Tangamanga II, San Luis Potosí	July 24
5	R2	San Luis Potosí	(Mexico) Autódromo Tangamanga II, San Luis Potosí	July 25
6	R1	Querétaro	(Mexico) Autódromo de Querétaro, El Marqués	August 28
6	R2	Querétaro	(Mexico) Autódromo de Querétaro, El Marqués	August 29
7	R1	Puebla	(Mexico) Autódromo Miguel E. Abed, Amozoc	September 25
7	R2	Puebla	(Mexico) Autódromo Miguel E. Abed, Amozoc	September 26
8	R1	Dallas	(United States) Motorsport Ranch, Cresson	October 30
8	R2	Dallas	(United States) Motorsport Ranch, Cresson	October 31
9	R1	Houston	(United States) MSR Houston, Angleton	November 6
9	R2	Houston	(United States) MSR Houston, Angleton	November 7

== Results ==
=== Races ===
No.		Race	Pole position	Fastest lap	Winner	Team
1	R1	(Mexico) Puebla	(Mexico) Enrique Baca	(Mexico) Gerardo Nieto	(Mexico) Rudy Camarillo	(Mexico) Team CSM
1	R2	(Mexico) Puebla		(Mexico) Rudy Camarillo	(Mexico) Rudy Camarillo	(Mexico) Team CSM
2	R1	(Mexico) Tuxtla Gutiérrez	(Mexico) Javier Echeverria	(Mexico) Rudy Camarillo	(Mexico) Rudy Camarillo	(Mexico) Team CSM
2	R2	(Mexico) Tuxtla Gutiérrez		(Mexico) Rudy Camarillo	(Mexico) Javier Echeverria	(Mexico) Team CSM
3	R1	(Mexico) Monterrey	(Venezuela) Giancarlo Serenelli	(Mexico) Rudy Camarillo	(Mexico) Gerardo Nieto	(Mexico) Re Racing
3	R2	(Mexico) Monterrey		(Mexico) Enrique Baca	(Mexico) Arturo Hernández	(Mexico) Megaracing
4	R1	(Mexico) Chihuahua	(Mexico) Gerardo Nieto	(Venezuela) Alex Popow	(Mexico) Javier Echeverria	(Mexico) Re Racing
4	R2	(Mexico) Chihuahua		(Mexico) Gerardo Nieto	(Venezuela) Giancarlo Serenelli	(Mexico) Re Racing
5	R1	(Mexico) San Luis Potosí	??	(Venezuela) Alex Popow	(Mexico) Arturo Hernández	(Mexico) Megaracing
5	R2	(Mexico) San Luis Potosí		(Mexico) Rudy Camarillo	(Mexico) Javier Echeverria	(Mexico) Re Racing
6	R1	(Mexico) Querétaro	(Mexico) Rudy Camarillo	(Mexico) Rudy Camarillo	(Mexico) Martín Fuentes	(Mexico) Megaracing
6	R2	(Mexico) Querétaro		(Venezuela) Giancarlo Serenelli	(Venezuela) Alex Popow	(Mexico) RAM Racing
7	R1	(Mexico) Puebla	(Mexico) Rudy Camarillo	(Mexico) Rudy Camarillo	(Mexico) Rudy Camarillo	(Mexico) Team CSM
7	R2	(Mexico) Puebla		(Venezuela) Giancarlo Serenelli	(Venezuela) Giancarlo Serenelli	(Mexico) Re Racing
8	R1	(United States) Dallas	(Mexico) Gerardo Nieto	(Venezuela) Giancarlo Serenelli	(Venezuela) Giancarlo Serenelli	(Mexico) Re Racing
8	R2	(United States) Dallas		(Venezuela) Giancarlo Serenelli	(Venezuela) Giancarlo Serenelli	(Mexico) Re Racing
9	R1	(United States) Houston	(Venezuela) Giancarlo Serenelli	(Mexico) Rudy Camarillo	(Venezuela) Giancarlo Serenelli	(Mexico) Re Racing
9	R2	(United States) Houston		(Venezuela) Giancarlo Serenelli	(Venezuela) Alex Popow	(Mexico) RAM Racing
