= Alfonso Celis Jr. =

Mexican racing driver

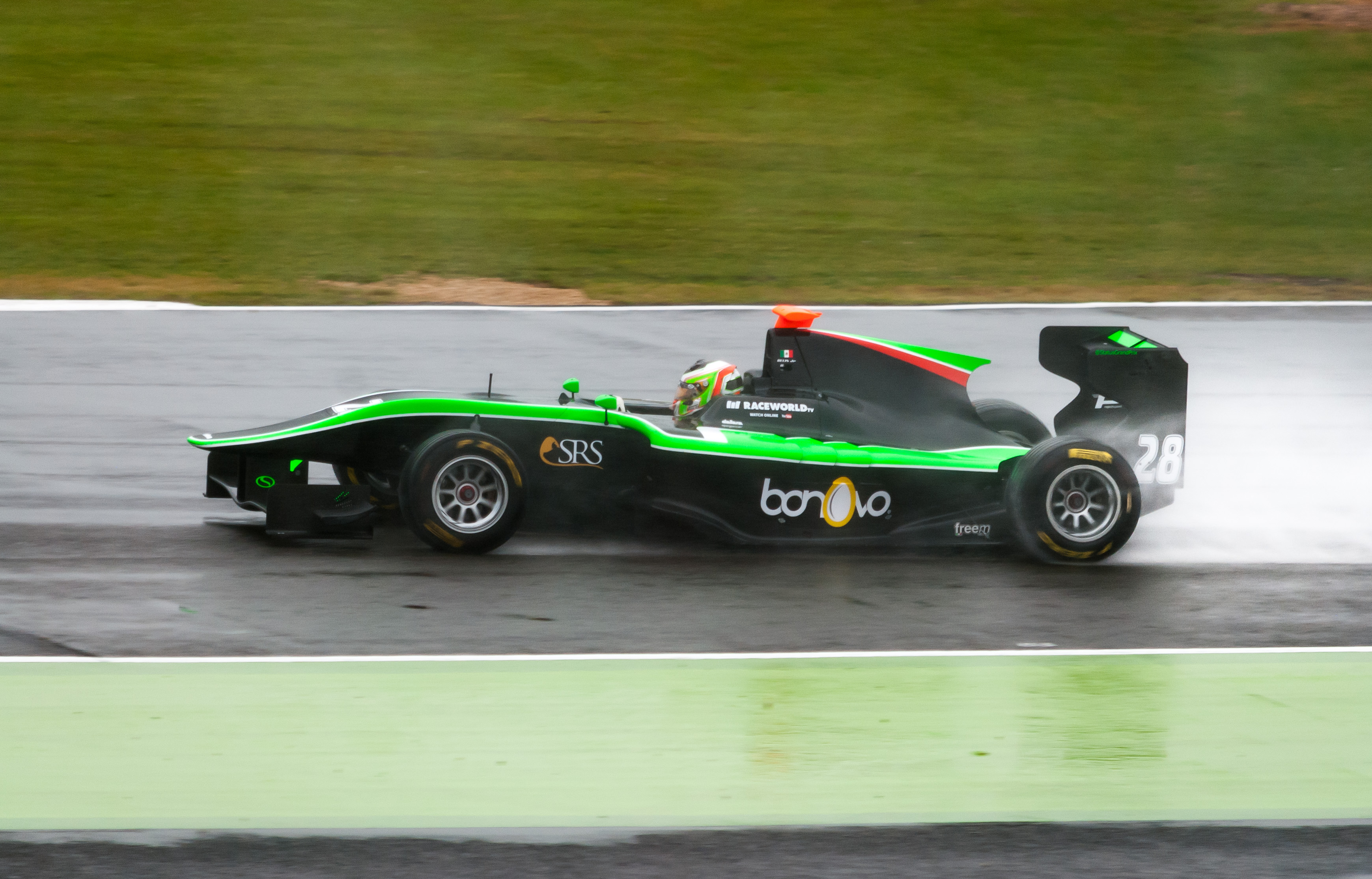
- Celis Jr. in 2014
- Nationality: (Mexico) Mexican
- Born: Alfonso Celis Enecoiz; 18 September 1996 (age 30) Mexico City, Mexico

GP3 Series career
- Debut season: 2014
- Car number: 4
- Former teams: Status Grand Prix, ART Grand Prix
- Starts: 35
- Wins: 0
- Poles: 0
- Fastest laps: 0
- Best finish: 12th in 2015

Previous series
- 2014–2015 2013–2014 2013 2012 2011: Formula Renault 3.5 Series; European Formula 3 Formula Renault 2.0 NEC; Formula BMW Talent Cup; Turismos de Velocidad 1800cc

Championship titles
- 2011: Campeonato Turismos de Velocidad 1800cc

Alfonso Celis Enecoiz, known as Alfonso Celis Jr., (born 18 September 1996) is a Mexican former racing driver.

== Career ==
=== Karting ===
Born in Mexico City, Celis entered karting in 2009 and raced until 2012 in the local Mexican karting championships.

=== Early career ===
In 2011, Celis made his début in single-seaters, taking part in the LATAM Challenge Series with Megaracing. He finished sixteenth with three top-ten finishes in five races.

For 2012, Celis decided to move in Europe and switch to the Formula BMW Talent Cup. He finished eighth in the grand finale at Motorsport Arena Oschersleben with a podium in the third race of the weekend.

=== Formula Renault ===
Celis signed with Fortec Motorsports for the 2013 Formula Renault 2.0 NEC season. He had eleven point-scoring finishes, including podium in the closing race of the season at Zandvoort, finishing fourteenth in the series standings.

=== Formula Three ===
During the 2013, Celis with Fortec had one-off entries to British Formula 3 and FIA European Formula 3 championships at Nürburgring and Zandvoort respectively.

=== GP3 Series ===
In 2014, Celis graduated to the GP3 Series with Status Grand Prix, joining Nick Yelloly and Richie Stanaway in the team. He finished 21st in the standings, only scoring points on one occasion. He switched to ART Grand Prix for the 2015 season.

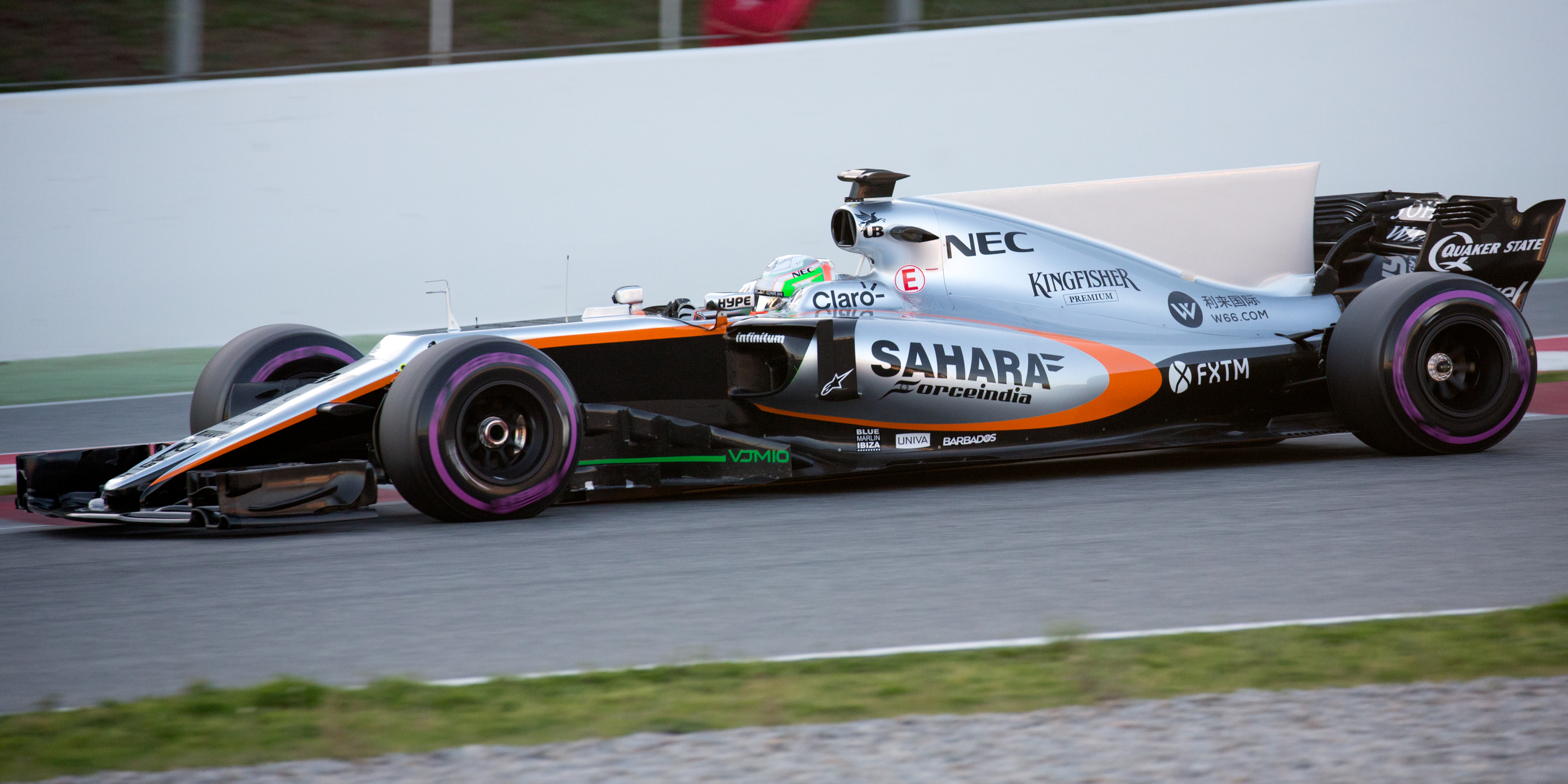
Celis testing for Force India in 2017.

=== Formula One ===
Celis was signed as a development and free practice driver by the Force India team in Formula One for the 2016 season. He made his first appearance during free practice at the Bahrain Grand Prix.

Celis made his second appearance on 1 March 2017 on Day 3 of testing at Circuit de Catalunya.

=== Indy Lights ===
Celis signed with Juncos Racing to compete in Indy Lights in 2018.

=== IndyCar ===
Celis made his IndyCar debut for Juncos Racing at Road America, finishing twentieth. He was later called up again to drive at Portland, where he finished seventeenth.

== Racing record ==
=== Career summary ===
| Season | Series | Team | Races | Wins | Poles | FLaps | Podiums | Points | Position |
|---|---|---|---|---|---|---|---|---|---|
| 2011 | Campeonato Turismos de Velocidad 1800cc | Nova / AST Racing | 7 | 5 | 7 | 1 | 7 | 291 | **1st** |
| 2011 | LATAM Challenge Series | Megaracing | 5 | 0 | 0 | 0 | 0 | 6 | 16th |
| 2011 | Super Copa Telcel | AT Motorsports | 12 | 0 | 0 | 0 | 1 | 964 | 9th |
| 2011 | 24 Hours of Barcelona - Class A3T | Astra Racing 1 | 1 | 0 | 0 | 0 | 0 | N/A | 10th |
| 2012 | Formula BMW Talent Cup | N/A | 3 | 0 | 0 | 0 | 1 | 24 | 6th |
| 2013 | Formula Renault 2.0 NEC | Fortec Motorsports | 17 | 0 | 0 | 0 | 1 | 109 | 14th |
| 2013 | British Formula 3 International Series | Fortec Motorsports | 3 | 0 | 0 | 0 | 0 | 15 | 11th |
| 2013 | FIA Formula 3 European Championship | Fortec Motorsports | 3 | 0 | 0 | 0 | 0 | 0 | 34th |
| 2013 | Pau Formula Renault 2.0 Trophy | Fortec Motorsports | 1 | 0 | 0 | 0 | 0 | N/A | NC |
| 2014 | GP3 Series | Status Grand Prix | 18 | 0 | 0 | 0 | 0 | 2 | 21st |
| 2014 | FIA Formula 3 European Championship | Fortec Motorsports | 3 | 0 | 0 | 0 | 0 | 0 | 29th |
| 2014 | Formula Renault 3.5 Series | Tech 1 Racing | 2 | 0 | 0 | 0 | 0 | 0 | 27th |
| 2015 | GP3 Series | ART Grand Prix | 16 | 0 | 0 | 0 | 1 | 24 | 12th |
| 2015 | Formula Renault 3.5 Series | AVF | 17 | 0 | 0 | 2 | 0 | 17 | 16th |
| 2015 | Toyota Racing Series | Giles Motorsport | 13 | 0 | 0 | 0 | 0 | 329 | 17th |
| 2016 | Formula V8 3.5 Series | AVF | 18 | 0 | 0 | 0 | 1 | 55 | 11th |
| 2016 | Formula One | Sahara Force India F1 Team | Test driver | | | | | | |
| 2017 | World Series Formula V8 3.5 | Fortec Motorsports | 18 | 1 | 1 | 2 | 7 | 204 | **3rd** |
| 2017 | Formula One | Sahara Force India F1 Team | Test driver | | | | | | |
| 2018 | Indy Lights | Juncos Racing | 2 | 0 | 0 | 0 | 0 | 27 | 11th |
| 2018 | IndyCar Series | Juncos Racing | 2 | 0 | 0 | 0 | 0 | 23 | 36th |

=== Complete Formula Renault 2.0 NEC results ===
(key) (Races in bold indicate pole position) (Races in italics indicate fastest lap)

| Year | Entrant | 1 | 2 | 3 | 4 | 5 | 6 | 7 | 8 | 9 | 10 | 11 | 12 | 13 | 14 | 15 | 16 | 17 | Pos | Points |
|---|---|---|---|---|---|---|---|---|---|---|---|---|---|---|---|---|---|---|---|---|
| 2013 | Fortec Competition | HOC; 1 Ret | HOC; 2 Ret | HOC; 3; 24 | NÜR; 1; 12 | NÜR; 2; 13 | SIL; 1; 5 | SIL; 2; 7 | SPA; 1; 20 | SPA; 2; 13 | ASS; 1; 12 | ASS; 2; 11 | MST; 1; 22 | MST; 2; 15 | MST; 3; 21 | ZAN; 1; 13 | ZAN; 2; 3 | ZAN; 3 C | 14th | 109 |

=== Complete GP3 Series results ===
(key) (Races in bold indicate pole position) (Races in italics indicate fastest lap)

| Year | Entrant | 1 | 2 | 3 | 4 | 5 | 6 | 7 | 8 | 9 | 10 | 11 | 12 | 13 | 14 | 15 | 16 | 17 | 18 | Pos | Points |
|---|---|---|---|---|---|---|---|---|---|---|---|---|---|---|---|---|---|---|---|---|---|
| 2014 | Status Grand Prix | CAT; FEA; 18 | CAT; SPR; Ret | RBR; FEA; Ret | RBR; SPR; 19 | SIL; FEA; 16 | SIL; SPR; 10 | HOC; FEA; Ret | HOC; SPR; 23† | HUN; FEA; 16 | HUN; SPR; 22 | SPA; FEA; 12 | SPA; SPR; 15 | MNZ; FEA; 16 | MNZ; SPR; Ret | SOC; FEA; 16 | SOC; SPR; 7 | YMC; FEA; 16 | YMC; SPR; Ret | 21st | 2 |
| 2015 | ART Grand Prix | CAT; FEA; 10 | CAT; SPR; 10 | RBR; FEA; 15 | RBR; SPR; Ret | SIL; FEA; 14 | SIL; SPR; 11 | HUN; FEA; 18 | HUN; SPR; 15 | SPA; FEA; 6 | SPA; SPR; 3 | MNZ; FEA | MNZ; SPR | SOC; FEA; 13 | SOC; SPR; 12 | BHR; FEA; 8 | BHR; SPR; 8 | YMC; FEA; Ret | YMC; SPR; 19 | 12th | 24 |

^{†} Driver did not finish the race, but was classified as he completed over 90% of the race distance.

=== Complete World Series Formula V8 3.5 results ===
(key) (Races in bold indicate pole position) (Races in italics indicate fastest lap)

| Year | Team | 1 | 2 | 3 | 4 | 5 | 6 | 7 | 8 | 9 | 10 | 11 | 12 | 13 | 14 | 15 | 16 | 17 | 18 | Pos | Points |
|---|---|---|---|---|---|---|---|---|---|---|---|---|---|---|---|---|---|---|---|---|---|
| 2014 | Tech 1 Racing | MNZ; 1 | MNZ; 2 | ALC; 1 | ALC; 2 | MON; 1 | SPA; 1 | SPA; 2 | MSC; 1 | MSC; 2 | NÜR; 1; 16 | NÜR; 2; 12 | HUN; 1 | HUN; 2 | LEC; 1 | LEC; 2 | JER; 1 | JER; 2 | | 27th | 0 |
| 2015 | AVF | ALC; 1 Ret | ALC; 2; 8 | MON; 1 Ret | SPA; 1; 13 | SPA; 2; 11 | HUN; 1; 14 | HUN; 2; 16 | RBR; 1 Ret | RBR; 2; 12 | SIL; 1; 13† | SIL; 2; 12 | NÜR; 1; 10 | NÜR; 2; 4 | BUG; 1 Ret | BUG; 2; 16 | JER; 1; 15 | JER; 2 Ret | | 16th | 17 |
| 2016 | AVF | ALC; 1; 6 | ALC; 2; 8 | HUN; 1 Ret | HUN; 2 Ret | SPA; 1; 10 | SPA; 2; 3 | LEC; 1; 11 | LEC; 2; 8 | SIL; 1 Ret | SIL; 2; 11 | RBR; 1; 4 | RBR; 2; 7 | MNZ; 1; 9 | MNZ; 2; 10 | JER; 1 Ret | JER; 2; 9 | CAT; 1 Ret | CAT; 2; 13 | 11th | 55 |
| 2017 | Fortec Motorsports | SIL; 1; 3 | SIL; 2; 6 | **SPA**; **1**; 1 | SPA; 2; 3 | MNZ; 1; 4 | MNZ; 2 Ret | JER; 1; 6 | JER; 2; 4 | ALC; 1; 3 | ALC; 2; 2 | NÜR; 1; 2 | NÜR; 2; 8 | MEX; 1; 5 | MEX; 2; 2 | COA; 1; 8 | COA; 2; 5 | BHR; 1; 6 | BHR; 2; 8 | 3rd | 204 |

^{†} Driver did not finish the race, but was classified as he completed over 90% of the race distance.

=== Complete Toyota Racing Series results ===
(key) (Races in bold indicate pole position) (Races in italics indicate fastest lap)

| Year | Team | 1 | 2 | 3 | 4 | 5 | 6 | 7 | 8 | 9 | 10 | 11 | 12 | 13 | 14 | 15 | 16 | DC | Points |
|---|---|---|---|---|---|---|---|---|---|---|---|---|---|---|---|---|---|---|---|
| 2015 | Giles Motorsport | RUA; 1; 8 | RUA; 2; 7 | RUA; 3; 8 | TER; 1 DNS | TER; 2 Ret | TER; 3 DNS | HMP; 1 Ret | HMP; 2; 10 | HMP; 3; 12 | TAU; 1; 10 | TAU; 2 Ret | TAU; 3; 18 | TAU; 4; 10 | MAN; 1; 17 | MAN; 2; 15 | MAN; 3; 13 | 17th | 329 |

=== Complete Formula One participations ===
(key) (Races in bold indicate pole position; races in italics indicate fastest lap)

| Year | Entrant | Chassis | Engine | 1 | 2 | 3 | 4 | 5 | 6 | 7 | 8 | 9 | 10 | 11 | 12 | 13 | 14 | 15 | 16 | 17 | 18 | 19 | 20 | 21 | WDC | Points |
|---|---|---|---|---|---|---|---|---|---|---|---|---|---|---|---|---|---|---|---|---|---|---|---|---|---|---|
| 2016 | Sahara Force India F1 Team | Force India VJM09 | Mercedes PU106C Hybrid 1.6 V6 t | AUS | BHR; TD | CHN | RUS; TD | ESP | MON | CAN | EUR | AUT; TD | GBR | HUN | GER | BEL | ITA; TD | SIN | MAL | JPN | USA; TD | MEX | BRA | ABU; TD | – | – |
| 2017 | Sahara Force India F1 Team | Force India VJM10 | Mercedes M08 EQ Power+ 1.6 V6 t | AUS | CHN | BHR | RUS | ESP | MON | CAN | AZE | AUT; TD | GBR | HUN; TD | BEL | ITA | SIN | MAL | JPN | USA | MEX; TD | BRA | ABU | | – | – |

=== American open-wheel racing results ===
==== Indy Lights ====
| Year | Team | 1 | 2 | 3 | 4 | 5 | 6 | 7 | 8 | 9 | 10 | 11 | 12 | 13 | 14 | 15 | 16 | 17 | Rank | Points | Ref |
|---|---|---|---|---|---|---|---|---|---|---|---|---|---|---|---|---|---|---|---|---|---|
| 2018 | Juncos Racing | STP | STP | ALA; 7 | ALA; 8 | IMS | IMS | INDY | RDA | RDA | IOW | TOR | TOR | MOH | MOH | GTW | POR | POR | 11th | 27 | |

==== IndyCar Series ====
(key)

| Year | Team | No. | Chassis | Engine | 1 | 2 | 3 | 4 | 5 | 6 | 7 | 8 | 9 | 10 | 11 | 12 | 13 | 14 | 15 | 16 | 17 | Rank | Points | Ref |
|---|---|---|---|---|---|---|---|---|---|---|---|---|---|---|---|---|---|---|---|---|---|---|---|---|
| 2018 | Juncos Racing | 32 | Dallara DW12 | Chevrolet | STP | PHX | LBH | ALA | IMS | INDY | DET | DET | TXS | RDA; 20 | IOW | TOR | MOH | POC | GTW | POR; 17 | SNM | 36th | 23 | |
