= 2009 LATAM Challenge Series =

Seasons
- ← 2008 2010 →

2009 LATAM Challenge Series season was the third season of LATAM Challenge Series.

== Schedule ==
2009 venues

Round		Race title	Track	Date
1	R1	Puebla	(Mexico) Autódromo Miguel E. Abed, Amozoc	March 21
1	R2	Puebla	(Mexico) Autódromo Miguel E. Abed, Amozoc	March 22
2	R1	Querétaro	(Mexico) Autódromo de Querétaro, El Marqués	April 25
2	R2	Querétaro	(Mexico) Autódromo de Querétaro, El Marqués	April 26
3	R1	Puebla	(Mexico) Autódromo Miguel E. Abed, Amozoc	May 23
3	R2	Puebla	(Mexico) Autódromo Miguel E. Abed, Amozoc	May 24
4	R1	Guadalajara	(Mexico) Autódromo Hermanos Gallo, Guadalajara	June 20
4	R2	Guadalajara	(Mexico) Autódromo Hermanos Gallo, Guadalajara	June 21
5	R1	Chihuahua	(Mexico) Autódromo de La Cantera, Chihuahua	August 1
5	R2	Chihuahua	(Mexico) Autódromo de La Cantera, Chihuahua	August 2
6	R1	Monterrey	(Mexico) Autódromo Monterrey, Apodaca	September 12
6	R2	Monterrey	(Mexico) Autódromo Monterrey, Apodaca	September 13
7	R1	San Luis Potosí	(Mexico) Autódromo Tangamanga II, San Luis Potosí	October 3
7	R2	San Luis Potosí	(Mexico) Autódromo Tangamanga II, San Luis Potosí	October 4
8	R1	Costa Rica	(Costa Rica) Autódromo La Guácima, Alajuela	November 27
8	R2	Costa Rica	(Costa Rica) Autódromo La Guácima, Alajuela	November 28
8	R3	Costa Rica	(Costa Rica) Autódromo La Guácima, Alajuela	November 29
8	R4	Costa Rica	(Costa Rica) Autódromo La Guácima, Alajuela	November 29

== Results ==
=== Races ===
No.		Race	Pole position	Fastest lap	Winner	Team
1	R1	(Mexico) Puebla	(Venezuela) Giancarlo Serenelli	(Venezuela) Giancarlo Serenelli	(Venezuela) Giancarlo Serenelli	
1	R2	(Mexico) Puebla		(Mexico) David Farías	(Venezuela) Giancarlo Serenelli	
2	R1	(Mexico) Querétaro	(Costa Rica) André Solano	(Mexico) David Farías	(Mexico) David Farías	
2	R2	(Mexico) Querétaro		(Costa Rica) André Solano	(Mexico) David Arrayales	
3	R1	(Mexico) Puebla	(Costa Rica) André Solano	(Mexico) Homero Richards	(Costa Rica) André Solano	
3	R2	(Mexico) Puebla		??	(Mexico) Enrique Baca	
4	R1	(Mexico) Guadalajara	(Mexico) Gerardo Nieto	??	(Mexico) Gerardo Nieto	
4	R2	(Mexico) Guadalajara		??	(Costa Rica) André Solano	
5	R1	(Mexico) Chihuahua	(Venezuela) Giancarlo Serenelli	(Mexico) David Farías	(Mexico) Gerardo Nieto	
5	R2	(Mexico) Chihuahua		(Venezuela) Giancarlo Serenelli	(Costa Rica) André Solano	
6	R1	(Mexico) Monterrey	(Venezuela) Giancarlo Serenelli	??	(Mexico) Gerardo Nieto	
6	R2	(Mexico) Monterrey		(Mexico) Gerardo Nieto	(Mexico) Gerardo Nieto	
7	R1	(Mexico) San Luis Potosí	(Mexico) Gerardo Nieto	??	(Mexico) Gerardo Nieto	
7	R2	(Mexico) San Luis Potosí		??	(Costa Rica) André Solano	
8	R1	Costa Rica	(Venezuela) Giancarlo Serenelli	(Venezuela) Giancarlo Serenelli	(Venezuela) Giancarlo Serenelli	
8	R2	Costa Rica		(Mexico) Gerardo Nieto	(Mexico) Gerardo Nieto	
8	R3	Costa Rica	(Venezuela) Giancarlo Serenelli	??	(Venezuela) Giancarlo Serenelli	
8	R4	Costa Rica		??	(Costa Rica) André Solano	

=== Points table ===
- see 2009 Formula Renault seasons
