= 2011 Super Copa Telcel =

Seasons
- ← none 2012 →

The 2011 Super Copa Telcel is the inaugural season of the Super Copa Telcel. This cup is the Mexican branch of SEAT León Supercopa. The serial was presented by Michel Jourdain in December 2010. SEAT León will be the car of the category. After 8 double events the Mexican driver Ricardo Pérez de Lara was proclaimed champion. Pérez de Lara won 4 races in the season.

== Cars ==
All the cars were SEAT Leon FWD.

Engine	4 cylinders turbocharged
Displacement	1984 cc
Power	301 HP
Torque	340 Nm @ N/A
Gearbox	DSG 6 speed
Length	4.6 m

- Continental supplied the tires.

== Drivers ==
Team	No.	Sponsor	Driver	Rounds
Junker/RPL Racing	2	Telmex-Benotto	(Mexico) Ricardo Pérez de Lara	1–12
Junker/RPL Racing	10	Auditor Services	(Mexico) Eduardo de León	1–12
Junker/RPL Racing	45	PDVSA	(Venezuela) Giancarlo Serenelli	1–12
Team Venezuela	15	Venezuela	(Venezuela) Juan Carlos Alvarez	1–12
Team Venezuela	16	Venezuela	(Venezuela) Nelson Canache Jr.	1–12
Team Venezuela	17	Venezuela	(Venezuela) Alex Popow	1–12
Orangino by Fili	44J	Orangino	(Mexico) César Tiberio Jiménez	1–4, 7–12
Orangino by Fili	44J	Orangino	(Mexico) Patrick Goeters	5–6
Parodi Pro Racing	12		(Mexico) Rubén Rovelo	3, 5, 8–9
Parodi Pro Racing	12		(Mexico) Luis Castro	1–2, 4, 6–7, 10–12
Bardhal	31	Bardhal	(Mexico) Jorge Goeters	1–12
Gas Uribe	30		(Mexico) Alexis Uribe	1–12
AT Motorsports	11	Avicola Tehuacan	(Mexico) Alfonso Celis Jr.	1–10
AT Motorsports	11	Avicola Tehuacan	(Mexico) Rubén Rovelo	11–12
Cedva			(Mexico) Jorge Contreras	1–4, 7–8, 11–12
Codwell Banker	18	Corporativo APQL	(Mexico) Marco Santibáñez	1–10
Codwell Banker	18	Corporativo APQL	(Mexico) Rubén Pardo	11–12
Trager	23		(Mexico) Rogelio German	1–12
Z Motors	44Z	Prenda Mex	(Mexico) Santos Zanella	1–10
Z Motors	44Z	Prenda Mex	(Mexico) Rubén Garcia Novoa	11–12
SEAT Pachuca	26	SEAT	(Mexico) Miguel Reyes	11–12

== Schedule ==
The calendar was presented in December, but was changed in March 2011.

Round		Race	Track	Date
1	R1	Monterrey	(Nuevo León) Autódromo Monterrey, Apodaca	May 8
1	R2	Monterrey	(Nuevo León) Autódromo Monterrey, Apodaca	May 8
2	R3	Pachuca	(Hidalgo (state)) Autódromo Moisés Solana, Mineral de la Reforma	May 29
2	R4	Pachuca	(Hidalgo (state)) Autódromo Moisés Solana, Mineral de la Reforma	May 29
3	R5	Mexico City	Autódromo Hermanos Rodríguez, Mexico City	July 3
3	R6	Mexico City	Autódromo Hermanos Rodríguez, Mexico City	July 3
4	R7	San Luis Potosí	Autódromo San Luis 400, San Luis Potosí	July 31
4	R8	San Luis Potosí	Autódromo San Luis 400, San Luis Potosí	July 31
5	R9	Zacatecas	Autódromo de Zacatecas, Zacatecas	August 28
5	R10	Zacatecas	Autódromo de Zacatecas, Zacatecas	August 28
6	R11	Pachuca	(Hidalgo (state)) Autódromo Moisés Solana, Mineral de la Reforma	September 25
6	R12	Pachuca	(Hidalgo (state)) Autódromo Moisés Solana, Mineral de la Reforma	September 25
7	R13	Querétaro	Autódromo de Querétaro, El Marqués	October 30
7	R14	Querétaro	Autódromo de Querétaro, El Marqués	October 30
8	R15	Puebla	(Puebla) Autódromo Miguel E. Abed, Amozoc	November 20
8	R16	Puebla	(Puebla) Autódromo Miguel E. Abed, Amozoc	November 20

=== Calendar changes ===
- Aguascalientes was changed by Zacatecas because the road track was not complete for the race.
- Guadalajara was changed by Pachuca because the track was damaged by floods in the track.

== Results ==
=== Races ===
Race	Race name	Pole position	Fastest lap	Winner
1	Monterrey	(Venezuela) Alex Popow	(Venezuela) Alex Popow	(Venezuela) Giancarlo Serenelli
2	Monterrey		(Venezuela) Nelson Canache Jr.	(Venezuela) Alex Popow
3	Pachuca	(Venezuela) Alex Popow	(Venezuela) Alex Popow	(Venezuela) Alex Popow
4	Pachuca		(Mexico) Ricardo Pérez de Lara	(Venezuela) Nelson Canache
5	México	(Mexico) Ricardo Pérez de Lara	(Mexico) Ricardo Pérez de Lara	(Venezuela) Giancarlo Serenelli
6	México		(Mexico) Ricardo Pérez de Lara	(Mexico) Ricardo Pérez de Lara
7	San Luis Potosí	(Venezuela) Alex Popow	(Venezuela) Alex Popow	(Venezuela) Alex Popow
8	San Luis Potosí		(Venezuela) Giancarlo Serenelli	(Mexico) Ricardo Pérez de Lara
9	Zacatecas	(Venezuela) Alex Popow	(Venezuela) Alex Popow	(Mexico) Jorge Goeters
10	Zacatecas		(Venezuela) Nelson Canache Jr.	(Mexico) Ricardo Pérez de Lara
11	Pachuca	(Venezuela) Alex Popow	(Venezuela) Alex Popow	(Venezuela) Alex Popow
12	Pachuca		(Mexico) Ricardo Pérez de Lara	(Mexico) Ruben Rovelo
13	Querétaro	(Venezuela) Alex Popow	(Mexico) Ricardo Pérez de Lara	(Mexico) Ricardo Pérez de Lara
14	Querétaro		(Mexico) Jorge Goeters	(Mexico) Rogelio German

=== Standings ===
Rank	Driver	(Nuevo León) MTY1	(Nuevo León) MTY2	(Hidalgo (state)) PAC1	(Hidalgo (state)) PAC2	(Mexico City) MEX1	(Mexico City) MEX2	(San Luis Potosí) SLP1	(San Luis Potosí) SLP2	(Zacatecas) ZAC1	(Zacatecas) ZAC2	(Hidalgo (state)) PAC3	(Hidalgo (state)) PAC4	(Querétaro) QRO1	(Querétaro) QRO2	Pts
1	(Mexico) Ricardo Pérez de Lara	5	14	2	4	3	1	5	1	8	1	4	3	1	3	1166
2	(Venezuela) Alex Popow	2	1	1	7	6	2	1	16	3	8	1	13	2	7	1151
3	(Venezuela) Giancarlo Serenelli	1	3	8	2	1	5	2	4	2	4	10	5	4	8	1126
4	(Venezuela) Nelson Canache Jr.	7	15	6	1	10	4	4	2	13	15	3	2	3	5	1058
5	(Mexico) César Tiberio Jiménez	4	2	15	8			7	6	4	3	5	4	5	4	1043
6	(Mexico) Jorge Goeters	3	16	7	6	4	15	3	3	1	5	2	12	11	6	1041
7	(Mexico) Rogelio German	6	9	4	5	11	6	6	5	6	2	14	DNS	7	1	1014
8	(Mexico) Miguel Reyes	9	4	5	3	7	3	9	7	7	6	13	7	6	9	992
9	(Mexico) Alfonso Celis Jr.	14	10	12	12	12	14	13	12	14	10			8	2	964
10	(Mexico) Alexis Uribe	12	6	9	10	9	12	11	9	9	14	9	9	12	12	922
11	(Mexico) Eduardo de León	15	11	13	13	8	9	8	8	10	7	11	11	10	10	919
12	(Mexico) Marco Santibañez	8	8	16	14	14	11	10	11	11	9			11	11	916
13	(Mexico) Santos Zanella	11	7	10	16	13	8	14	14	12	11			14	14	891
14	(Venezuela) Juan Carlos Alvarez	13	13	11	11	15	13	12	13	15	13	16	DNS			751
15	(Mexico) Luis Castro	16	12		9		10	16			12	12	10	9	13	641
16	(Mexico) Jorge Contreras Jr.	10	5	14	15	DNS	DNS	15	15	DNS	DNS	6	8			521
17	(Mexico) Rubén Rovelo			3		5			10	5		7	1			292
18	(Mexico) Patrick Goeters					2	7									159
19	(Mexico) Ruben Pardo											8	6			138
20	(Mexico) Ruben Garcia Novoa											15	14			123
