= Alec Udell =

American race car driver

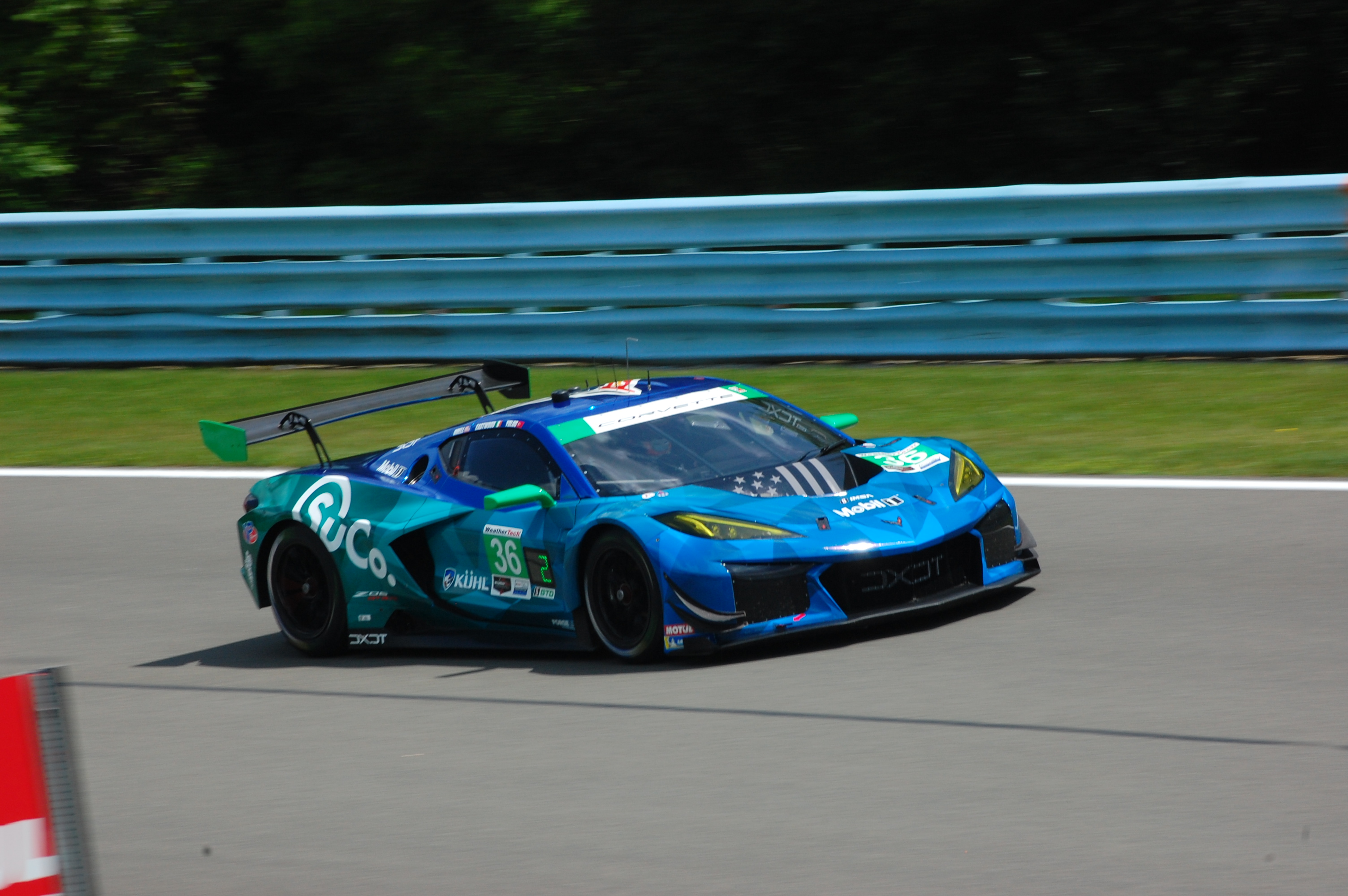
- Udell's DXDT Corvette in 2025.
- Nationality: (United States) American
- Born: Alec Robert Udell; November 29, 1995 (age 30) Houston, Texas, U.S.
- Categorisation: FIA Silver

Championship titles
- 2019 2016 2012 2011–2012 2011–12: GT4 European Series; Pirelli World Challenge - GTC; NASA Texas - Spec Miata; Teen Mazda Challenge Texas; MSR Houston Spec Miata

Alec Robert Udell (born November 29, 1995) is an American racing driver who last raced in the IMSA SportsCar Championship for DXDT Racing. A GT3 specialist primarily in Porsche and Corvette machinery, he concurrently serves as a simulator driver for the Cadillac F1 Team.

== Racing career ==
=== Early career ===
Udell grew up racing go-karts initially around Texas then moved into national competition, winning four national karting Championships. At the age of 15, he became the youngest driver, at the time, to race in the professional Pirelli World Challenge Racing series, racing a Chevrolet Camaro.

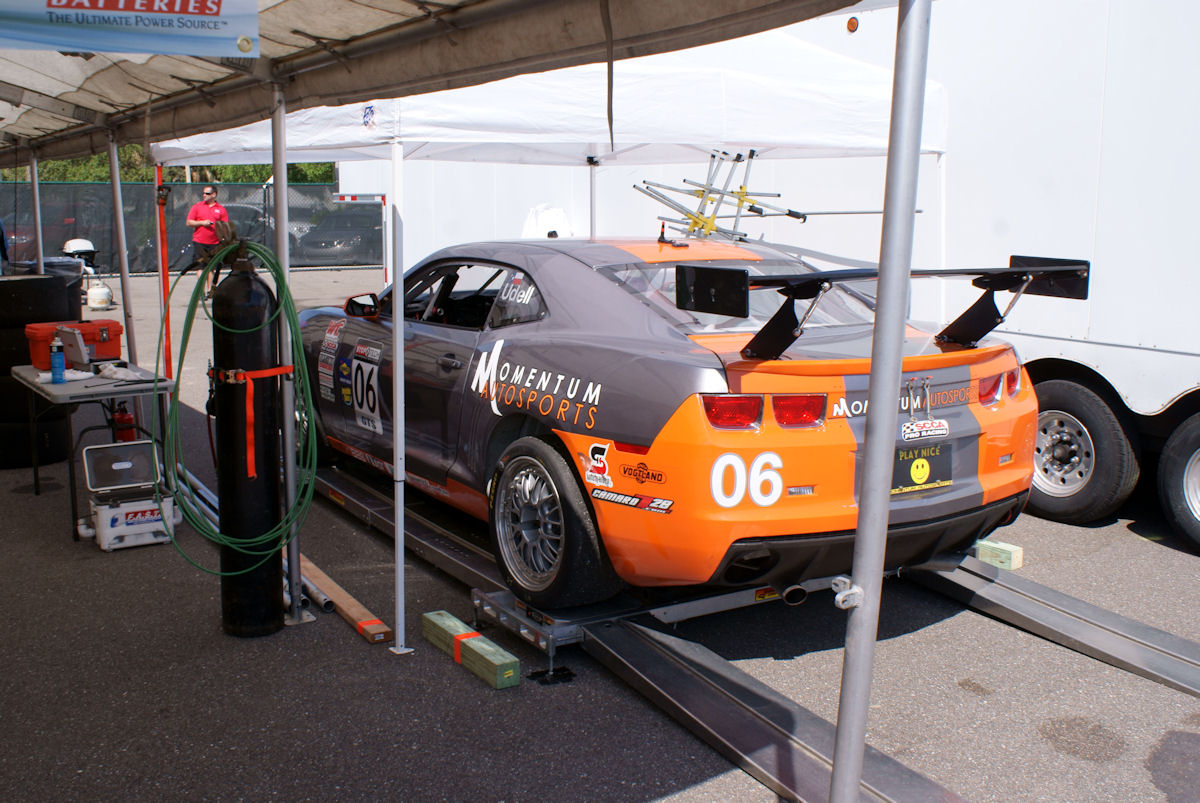
Udell's Chevrolet Camaro in 2011.

From 2011 to 2014, Udell competed in the Pirelli World Challenge GTS category (now known as the SRO America GT4 series). In this series, he competed in a Chevrolet Camaro (2011) with Momentum Autosports, and a Ford Boss 302 (2012-2014) with Motorsports Development Group. In the four seasons of racing in the GTS category, Udell garnered four podium finishes, one pole position and one fastest race lap.

During this time, Udell also competed in the NASA regional and national racing series. In 2012, he won the NASA Texas region championship in a Spec Miata. In 2013, Udell competed in the Nasa Pro American Iron class, winning the National Championship at Utah Motorsports Campus in a Boss 302. Additionally in 2013, Udell campaigned a Boss 302 in the Grand Am racing series at the Lime Rock round. In 2014, Udell had his first GT experience, testing the RISI Competizione Ferrari 458 Italia GTLM car and racing at the Circuit of the Americas round of the IMSA Tudor series in a Porsche 911 GT America car.

In 2015, Udell stepped up into the new GT3 Cup category in Pirelli World Challenge driving with GMG in the No. 17 Euroworld Motorsports 991.1 Porsche GT3 Cup car. In 2015, his first season in the car, he took three wins, 13 podium finishes, and one pole position in 14 starts. The next year in 2016, Udell went back into the GT3 cup category again with GMG in the No. 17 Euroworld Motorsprots 991.1 Porsche GT3 Cup car. In 2016, Udell was dominant, winning 12 of 18 races competed in, and finishing on the podium in every race of the GT3 Cup series that year.

In 2015, Udell was selected as one of four Porsche Young Driver Academy participants at Barber Motorsports Park in Birmingham, AL. In 2016, he finished the Pirelli World Challenge season out competing in a Porsche GT3R in the final round of the Sprint-X series, where he finished sixth. Udell also had a guest appearance at the Porsche Mobil 1 Supercup event at Circuit of the Americas where he finished 11th and sixth.

=== GT World Challenge America ===
2017 saw Udell jump into GT3 ranks competing in the No. 17 Euroworld Motorsports Porsche GT3R initially in GT-A within the SRO series, where he won both of the opening rounds at St. Petersburg. From there, he was put into the Pro Category to compete against full factory efforts as a privateer, finding sponsorship and still a student in college. He had a career best overall podium at Mid-Ohio finishing third, behind Porsche Factory driver Patrick Long. Additionally in 2017, Udell competed in the SprintX Pro-Am category in the No. 77 Calvert Dynamics Porsche GT3R. In 2018, Udell Competed in five events in the No. 41 Loci Porsche GT3R, having a career best finish at VIRginia International Raceway, finishing third in SprintX Pro-Pro.

Udell returned to GT World Challenge America in 2024, joining Corvette factory driver Tommy Milner at DXDT Racing. Despite skipping the first two rounds, the pair managed to pick up seven victories, hand the Chevrolet Corvette Z06 GT3.R its first ever win, and finish runner-up overall.

=== GT4 European Series ===
In 2019, Udell made the jump to European Competition, competing in the SRO GT4 European Series in the No. 25 MDM Motorsport BMW M4. Udell competed in the Silver Cup class, winning three races, finishing five times on the podium and ultimately winning the Silver Championship in his first year of European Competition.

=== IMSA SportsCar Championship ===
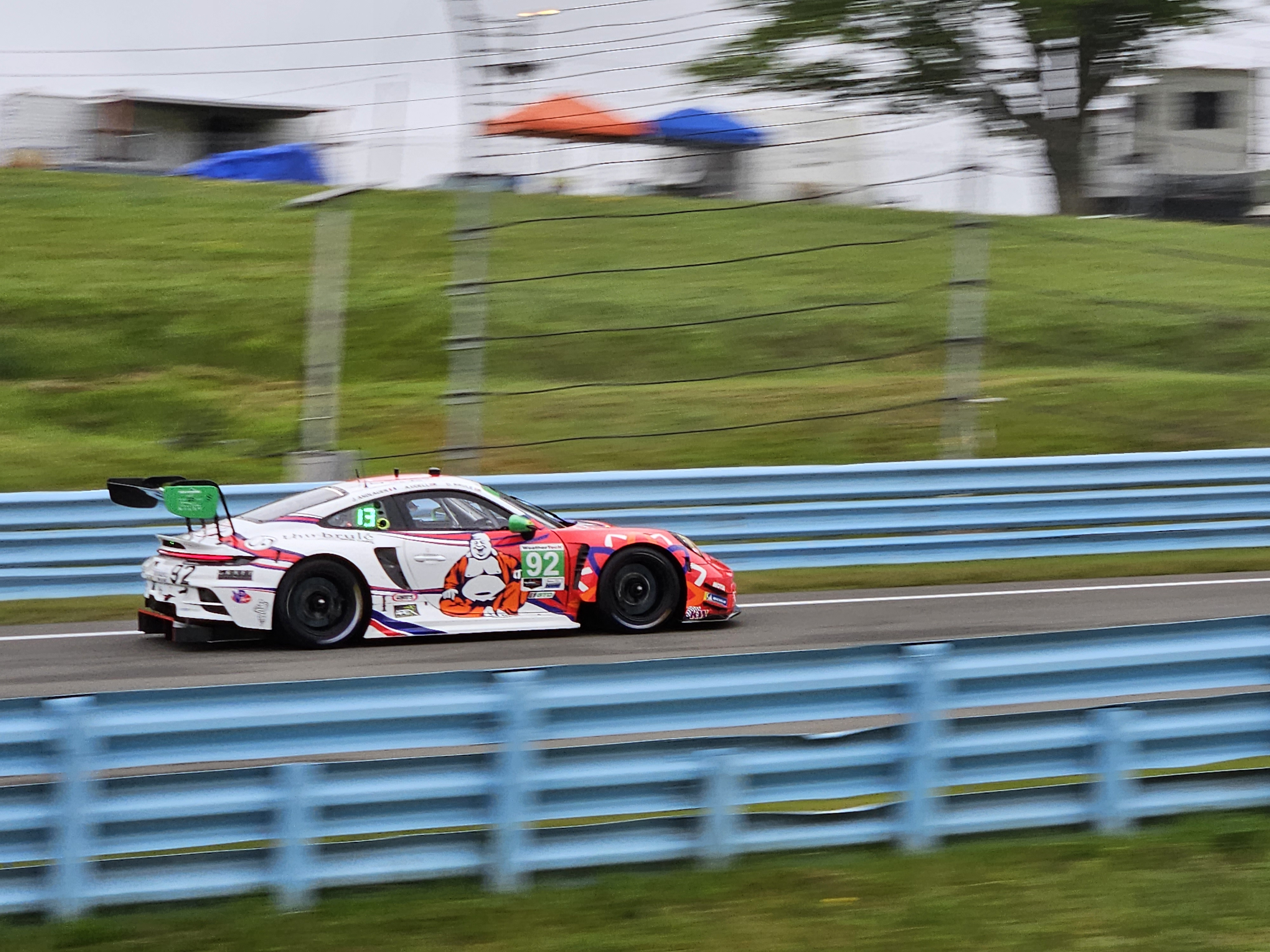
Udell's KellyMoss with Riley Porsche in 2023.

Udell made his full-time IMSA debut in 2023, driving a Porsche 911 GT3 R (992) for Kelly-Moss with Riley. Partnering bronze-rated David Brule and Porsche stalwart Julien Andlauer, Udell scored three podiums, including one at the 12 Hours of Sebring, and grabbed pole position at Laguna Seca to secure ninth in the GTD standings.

In 2025, Udell and his GTWC America team DXDT Racing graduated to IMSA. He was joined by various teammates across the year, namely Corvette works driver Charlie Eastwood and Salih Yoluç in the endurance rounds and Robert Wickens at the sprint races. It was a podium-less season for Udell, who finished 14th in GTD.

=== Formula One ===
In 2026, Udell signed for the new Cadillac F1 Team as simulator driver.

== Racing record ==
=== Career summary ===
Season	Series	Team	Races	Wins	Poles	F/Laps	Podiums	Points	Position
2010	MSRC Lone Star Challenge		?	?	?	?	?	?	6th
2011	Pirelli World Challenge - GTS	Momentum Autosports	8	0	0	?	0	502	9th
2011	NASA Texas - Spec Miata		13	4	?	?	10	1244	**2nd**
2011	Teen Mazda Challenge Texas-Midwest		4	4	?	?	4	715	**1st**
2011	NASA National Championships - Spec Miata		1	0	?	1	0	N/A	DNF
2011–12	MSR Houston Spec Miata Challenge		8	5	?	?	6	145	**1st**
2012	Pirelli World Challenge - GTS	Motorsports Development Group	11	0	0	0	1	700	8th
2012	NASA National Championships - STR2	Motorsports Development Group	1	0	0	0	0	N/A	8th
2012	NASA Texas - Spec Miata		18	8	?	?	12	1573	**1st**
2012	Teen Mazda Challenge Texas-Midwest		9	7	?	?	8	1465	**1st**
2012	NASA National Championships - Spec Miata		1	0	0	0	0	N/A	35th
2012–13	MSR Houston Spec Miata Challenge		4	1	?	?	2	83	10th
2013	Pirelli World Challenge - GTS	Motorsports Development Group	13	0	0	1	1	1036	6th
2013	Teen Mazda Challenge Texas-Midwest		4	1	?	?	4	695	6th
2014	Pirelli World Challenge - GTS	Motorsports Development Group	16	0	0	0	2	988	9th
2014	United SportsCar Championship - GTD	Mühlner Motorsports America	1	0	0	0	0	17	93rd
2015	Pirelli World Challenge - GT Cup	GMG Racing	14	3	1	2	13	1484	4th
2016	Pirelli World Challenge - GT Cup	GMG Racing	18	12	10	12	18	1971	**1st**
2016	Porsche Supercup	Moorespeed	2	0	0	0	0	N/A	NC
2017	Pirelli World Challenge - GT	GMG Racing	9	0	0	0	1	153	15th
2017	Pirelli World Challenge - GT	Calvert Dynamics	10	0	0	0	0	153	15th
2017	Intercontinental GT Challenge	GMG Racing	1	0	0	0	0	6	13th
2017	Continental Tire SportsCar Challenge - GS	GMG Racing	1	0	0	0	0	19	33rd
2018	Pirelli World Challenge - GT	GMG Racing	5	0	0	0	0	53	25th
2019	GT4 European Series - Silver	MDM Motorsport	12	3	0	1	5	156	**1st**
2019	GT4 America Series - SprintX Pro-Am	GMG Racing	4	0	0	0	2	60	7th
2019	Michelin Pilot Challenge - GS	KohR Motorsports	1	0	0	0	0	20	67th
2020	Michelin Pilot Challenge - GS	Winward Racing	6	0	0	0	1	128	25th
2020	GT World Challenge America - Silver	Winward Racing	2	0	0	0	2	36	**3rd**
2021	Lamborghini Super Trofeo North America - Pro	Kelly-Moss Road and Race	10	0	1	2	3	67	5th
2021	Michelin Pilot Challenge - GS	Winward Racing	6	0	0	0	3	1510	20th
2022	IMSA SportsCar Championship - LMP3	Mühlner Motorsports America	1	0	0	0	0	250	35th
2022	Michelin Pilot Challenge - GS	Kelly-Moss Road and Race	4	0	0	1	1	790	34th
2023	IMSA SportsCar Championship - GTD	Kelly-Moss with Riley	11	0	1	0	3	2652	9th
2023	GT4 America Series - Pro-Am	GMG Racing	2	0	0	0	0	6	20th
2024	GT World Challenge America - Pro	DXDT Racing	9	8	4	0	8	230	**2nd**
2024	24 Hours of Nürburgring - Cup3	AVIA W&S Motorsport	1	0	0	0	1	N/A	**2nd**
2024	IMSA SportsCar Championship - GTD	Kelly-Moss with Riley	1	0	0	0	0	208	63rd
2025	IMSA SportsCar Championship - GTD	DXDT Racing	9	0	0	0	0	2035	14th
2025	GT World Challenge America - Pro-Am	DXDT Racing	1	0	0	0	0	N/A	NC
2025	GT World Challenge Europe Endurance Cup - Silver	Steller Motorsport	1	0	0	0	0	0	NC
2026	European Le Mans Series - LMGT3	TF Sport	6	1	1	1	4	88	**1st**
2026	IMSA SportsCar Championship - GTD	AF Corse USA	1	0	0	0	0	652	47th
2026	IMSA SportsCar Championship - GTD	DragonSpeed	1	0	0	0	0	652	47th
2026	IMSA SportsCar Championship - GTD	Conquest Racing	1	0	0	1	0	652	47th
2026	Formula One	Cadillac F1 Team	Simulator driver						

=== Complete WeatherTech SportsCar Championship results ===
(key) (Races in bold indicate pole position; results in italics indicate fastest lap)

Year	Team	Class	Make	Engine	1	2	3	4	5	6	7	8	9	10	11	Pos.	Points	Ref
2014	Mühlner Motorsports America	GTD	Porsche 911 GT America	Porsche 4.0 L Flat-6	DAY	SEB	LGA	DET	WGL	MOS	IMS	ELK	VIR	COA; 15	PET			
2022	Mühlner Motorsports America	LMP3	Duqueine M30 - D08	Nissan VK56DE 5.6 L V8	DAY	SEB; 9	MDO	WGL	MOS	ELK	PET					35th	250	
2023	Kelly-Moss with Riley	GTD	Porsche 911 GT3 R (992)	Porsche 4.2 L Flat-6	DAY; 21	SEB; 3	LBH; 13	**LGA**; 3	WGL; 10	MOS; 12	LIM; 2	ELK; 13	VIR; 14	IMS; 8	PET; 4	9th	2652	
2024	Kellymoss with Riley	GTD	Porsche 911 GT3 R (992)	Porsche 4.2 L Flat-6	DAY; 11	SEB	LBH	LGA	WGL	MOS	ELK	VIR	IMS	PET		63th	208	
2025	DXDT Racing	GTD	Chevrolet Corvette Z06 GT3.R	Chevrolet LT6 5.5 L V8	DAY; 19	SEB; 8	LBH	LGA; 10	WGL; 15	MOS; 4	ELK; 8	VIR; 10	IMS; 17	PET; 7		14th	2035	
2026	AF Corse	GTD	Ferrari 296 GT3 Evo	Ferrari F163CE 3.0 L Turbo V6	DAY	SEB	LBH	LGA	WGL; 17	MOS						47th	652	
2026	Conquest Racing	GTD	Ferrari 296 GT3 Evo	Ferrari F163CE 3.0 L Turbo V6											PET; 13	47th	652	
2026	DragonSpeed	GTD	Chevrolet Corvette Z06 GT3.R	Chevrolet LT6 5.5 L V8							ELK; 4	VIR	IMS			47th	652	

^{*} Season still in progress.

=== Complete European Le Mans Series results ===
(key) (Races in bold indicate pole position) (Races in italics indicate fastest lap)

Year	Entrant	Class	Chassis	Engine	1	2	3	4	5	6	Rank	Points
2026	TF Sport	LMGT3	Chevrolet Corvette Z06 GT3.R	Chevrolet LT6 5.5 L V8	CAT; Ret	LEC; 2	**IMO**; 1	SPA; 6	SIL; 2	ALG; 2	1st	88
