= Amozoc Municipality =

Coordinates: 19°02′N 98°03′W

Amozoc
- Municipality
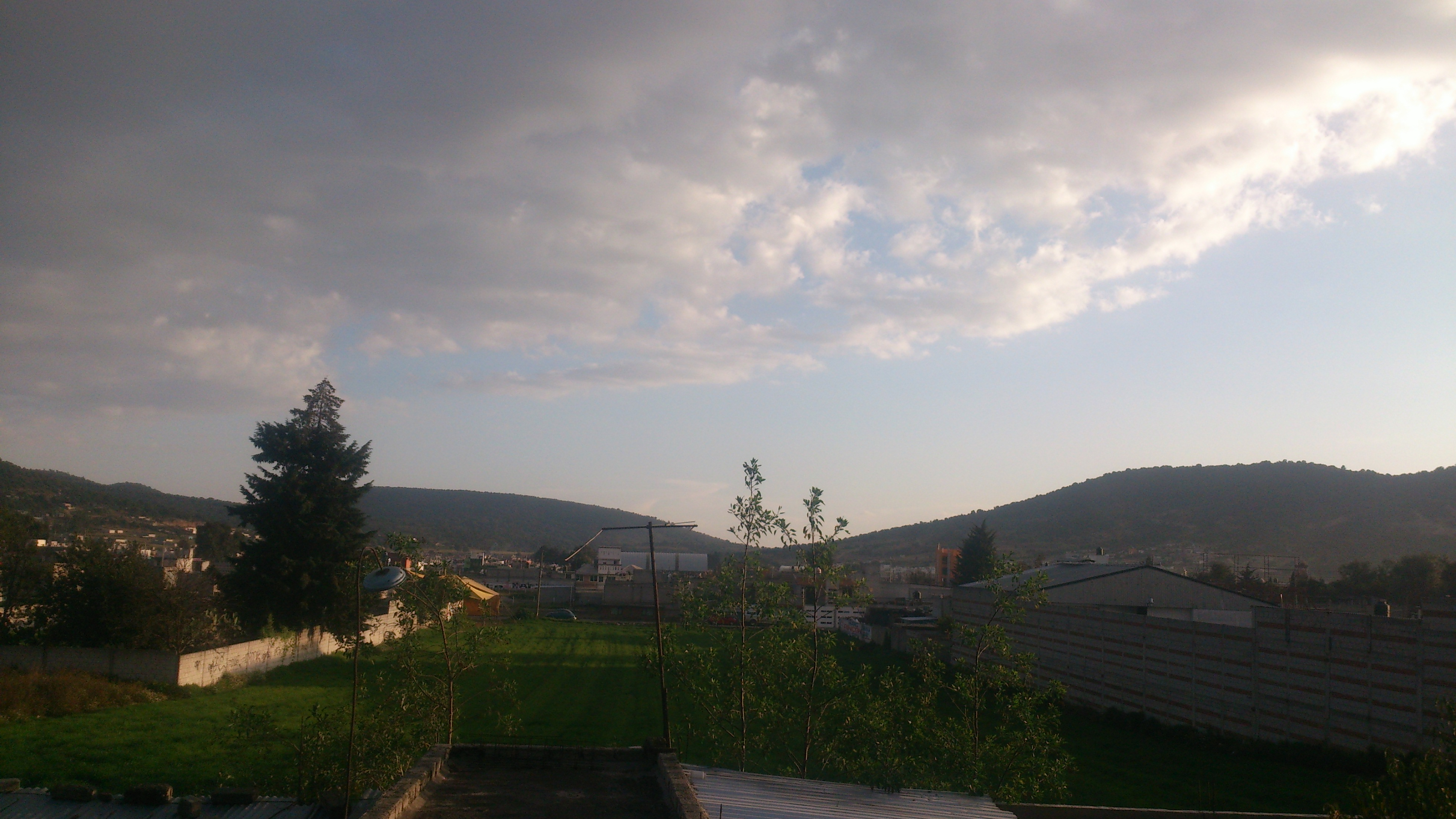

- Coat of arms

- Location of the municipality in Puebla
- Country: Mexico
- State: Puebla
- Seat: Amozoc de Mota

Population (2020)
  - Total: 125,876
- Time zone: UTC-6 (Zona Centro)

Amozoc is a municipality in the Mexican state of Puebla.
