= César Tiberio Jiménez =

Mexican racing driver (born 1969)

- Nationality: (Mexico) Mexican
- Born: July 4, 1969 (age 57) Monterrey, Mexico

Super Copa Telcel career
- Debut season: 2011
- Current team: Equipo Orangino
- Car number: T44
- Starts: 16
- Wins: 2

Championship titles
- 1992: Mexican Formula Three Championship

César Tiberio Jiménez (born July 4, 1969) is a Mexican racing driver. He is the son of Filiberto Jiménez and champion in several categories in Mexico (Formula Three, MasterCard Truck Series).

== Family ==
Jiménez is the son of driver and promoter Filiberto Jiménez, who built the Autódromo Monterrey. His brother Gilberto and nephew Gilbo are also drivers.

== Career ==
Tiberio debuted in Formula K at 17 years old. He won in Formula Three International on 1991 and 1992. In 1993, he ran in the Indy Lights, but did not have much success. He later ran in the Indy Lights Panamericana.

== Promoter ==
Jiménez took the place of his father in promoting racing events in the Autódromo Monterrey, and built the Museo del Automovilismo Deportivo Regiomontano in Monterrey inaugurated on August 23, 2008.

== Racing record ==
=== American Open Wheel ===
(key)

==== Indy Lights ====
Year	Team	1	2	3	4	5	6	7	8	9	10	11	12	Rank	Pts	Ref
1993		PHO; 12	LBH; 9	MIL; 7	DET	POR	CLE; 12	TOR; 18	NWH; 11	VAN; 17	MDO; 10	NAZ; 11	LAG; 21	15	19	

Sporting positions
Preceded by Adrián Fernández	Mexican Formula Three Champion; 1992	Succeeded by Carlos Guerrero
