= LATAM Challenge Series =

- Category: Open-wheel racing
- Country: Mexico, USA
- Inaugural season: 2008
- Folded: 2014
- Constructors: Tatuus
- Engine suppliers: Volkswagen
- Tire suppliers: Kumho
- Last Drivers' champion: (Venezuela) Francisco Cerullo
- Official website: latamchallengeseries.com

LATAM Challenge Series was an open-wheel racing series based in Latin America. LATAM was the replacement for Formula Renault 2000 de America.

== Venues ==
LATAM venues in Mexico and Texas

In the 7 seasons, 20 venues were used, all road courses. The races were mostly held in Mexico until 2013, whereas all the races in 2014 season were held in Florida and in Texas.

In 2008 and 2009 the series was a support race for the World Touring Car Championship's Race of Mexico in Puebla.

Circuit	Location	Races	Years
Autódromo Miguel E. Abed	Puebla	18	2008–2013
Autódromo del Águila	Morelia	2	2008
Autódromo San Luis 400	San Luis Potosí	12	2008–2013
Autódromo del EcoCentro	Querétaro	10	2008–2011, 2013
Autódromo de Zacatecas	Zacatecas	4	2008, 2012
Autódromo Guadalajara	Guadalajara	8	2008–2009, 2012–2013
Autódromo de la Cantera	Chihuahua	6	2008–2010
Autódromo Monterrey	Monterrey	10	2008–2011, 2013
Autódromo La Guácima	Alajuela (Costa Rica)	4	2009
Autódromo Chiapas	Tuxtla Gutiérrez	2	2010
Motorsport Ranch	Cresson (USA)	6	2010, 2013–2014
MSR Houston	Angleton (USA)	10	2010–2014
Circuito Centro Dinámico Pegaso	Toluca	4	2011–2012
Autódromo Hermanos Rodríguez	Mexico City	6	2011–2013
Eagles Canyon Raceway	Decatur (USA)	4	2011–2012
Óvalo Aguascalientes México	Aguascalientes	4	2012–2013
Homestead–Miami Speedway	Homestead (USA)	6	2014
Palm Beach International Raceway	Palm Beach County (USA)	2	2014
Sebring International Raceway	Sebring (USA)	2	2014
Daytona International Speedway	Daytona Beach (USA)	2	2014

== Cars ==
For the first two seasons, Formula Renault 2.0 cars was used. From 2010 the series uses a Formula Vee configuration, with Volkswagen engines. Tatuus chassis are used.

== Seasons ==
Season	Champion				
Season	Driver	Team	Chassis	Engine	Tires
2008	(Venezuela) Giancarlo Serenelli	RE Racing	Tatuus	Renault	K
2009	(Costa Rica) André Solano	Team Costa Rica Unico	Tatuus	Renault	K
2010	(Venezuela) Giancarlo Serenelli	RE Racing	Tatuus	Renault / Volkswagen	K
2011	(Venezuela) Giancarlo Serenelli	RE Racing	Tatuus	Volkswagen	K
2012	(Venezuela) Francisco Cerullo	RE Racing	Tatuus	Volkswagen	K
2013	(Venezuela) Francisco Cerullo				
2014	(Guatemala) Sebastian Arriola				
Succeeded by the 2015–16 NACAM Formula 4 Championship

== Records ==
=== Most wins ===
Rank	Driver	Wins
1	(Venezuela) Giancarlo Serenelli	20
2	(Mexico) Rudy Camarillo	11
3	(Costa Rica) André Solano	8
3	(Mexico) Gerardo Nieto	8
5	(Mexico) Homero Richards	4
6	(Mexico) Javier Echeverria	3
6	(Mexico) Hugo Oliveras	3

== See also ==
- NACAM Formula 4 Championship
- Panam GP Series
