= Eagles Canyon Raceway =

Motorsport track in the United States

ECR
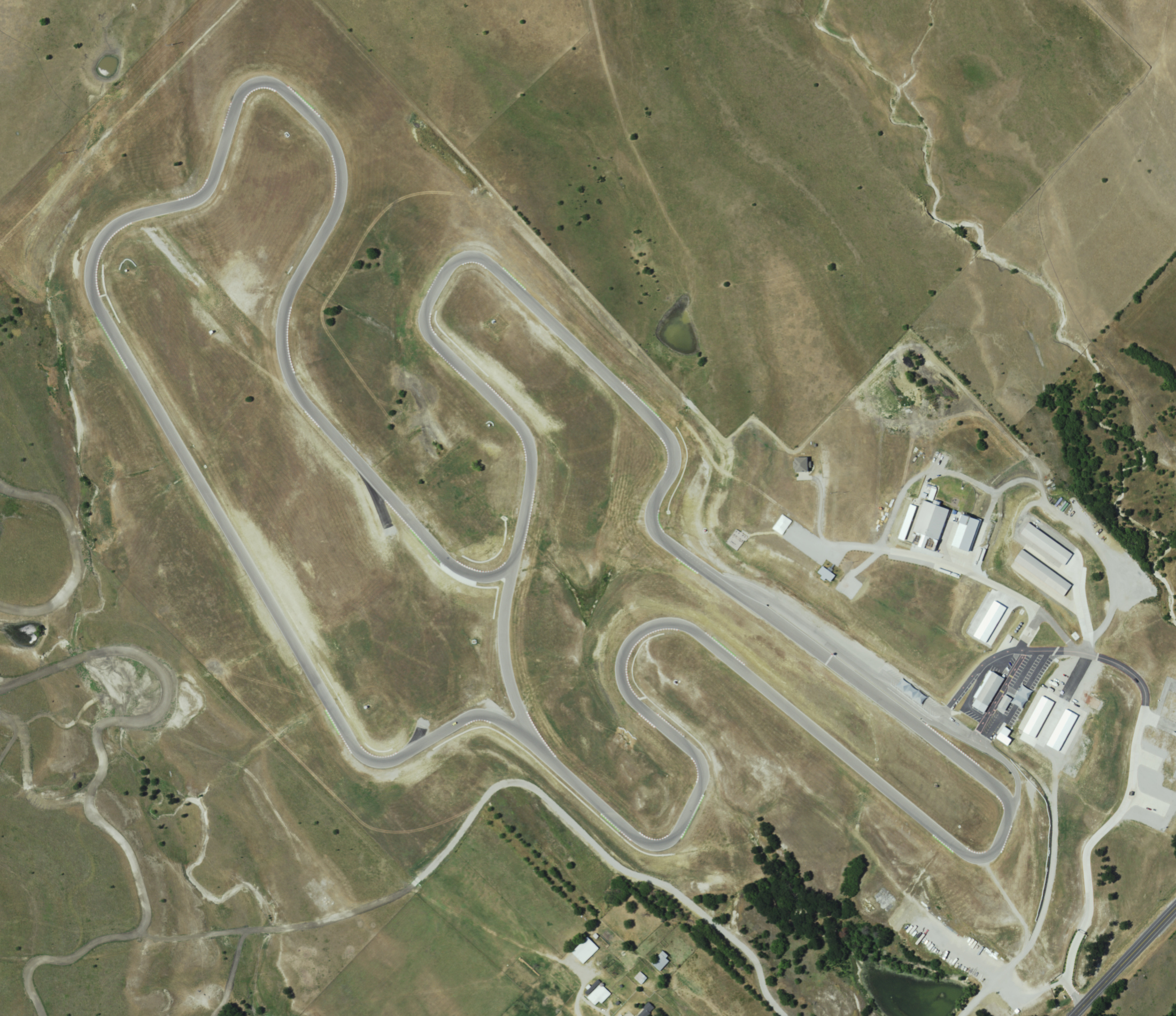
- 2022 aerial photo
- Location: Decatur, Texas, United States
- Coordinates: 33.366921°N 97.427176°W
- Owner: Autodrome LLC
- Address: 7629 North FM 51; Decatur, TX 76234
- Broke ground: April 28, 2006
- Opened: November 16, 2007; 18 years ago
- Architect: Rob Wilson and Peter Windsor (designers)
- Website: https://eaglescanyon.com/

Original course (2007–2018)
- Surface: asphalt
- Length: 2.5 mi (4.1 km)
- Turns: 11
- Race lap record: 1.39.993 (Anders Krohn, Pro Formula Star Mazda, 2009)

Italian Canyon (2019– )
- Surface: asphalt, repaved 2019
- Length: 2.75 mi (4.42 km)
- Turns: 15

Canyon (2007– )
- Surface: asphalt, repaved 2019
- Length: 1.65 mi (2.66 km)
- Turns: 9

Little Italy (2020– )
- Surface: asphalt, crossover planned for 2020
- Length: 1.2 mi (1.9 km)
- Turns: 6

Eagles Canyon Raceway is a motor racing track near Decatur, Texas built to FIA specifications. The track is located 50 miles (80 km) northwest of Fort Worth in eastern Wise County.

The track was devised by David and Linda Cook, both with extensive backgrounds in motorsports, who set out to create a Formula 1-style race track in North Texas. They spent over two years locating the ideal land to recreate the feel of European countryside, eventually purchasing 441 acres (178 ha) of prairie land near Decatur in January 2006. The rocky hills and valleys of the property give the track 70 feet (21 m) of total elevation change, as a bonus providing good viewing for spectators.

Ground breaking on Eagles Canyon started in April 2006. The track was designed in consultation with former racing driver Rob Wilson, former Formula One team manager and commentator Peter Windsor, and motorsport enthusiasts Dudley and Sally Mason-Styrron, among others. Central Motorcycle Roadracing Association provided design input from a motorcyclist's perspective regarding curbs and the pit lane. In October 2006 a small plane crashed upon take off from the still under construction track. The original 2.5-mile (4.0 km), 11-turn track opened in November 2007 after a $3.5 million investment. It is 40 feet (12 m) wide overall and 48 feet (15 m) on the front straight. The track has 200 feet (61 m) of elevation changes up and down, evoking the feel of Sonoma Raceway and Laguna Seca. The 2,200-foot (670 m) back straight and other straightaways terminate into hard braking zones ideal for passing. The track features sweepers, esses, switchbacks, carousels, and double apex turns. A shorter 1.65-mile (2.66 km) variant of only the east side of the track has 9 turns. Courses may be run either clockwise or counterclockwise.

In June 2017 David Cook sold Eagles Canyon to Livio Galanti of Autodrome LLC, who quickly began renovating the track and facilities. Construction began in August 2018 to repave the bumpy track and update the layout of the main course. Four turns were added to the original track, renamed the "Italian Canyon", increasing its turn count to 15 and length to 2.75 miles (4.43 km). The smaller 1.65-mile (2.66 km) track, "Canyon", retained the same shape. A proposed 1.2-mile (1.9 km), 6-turn layout named "Little Italy" consisting of the track's west loop would be made possible by paving a new crossover; however, as of 2020 this remains incomplete.

Eagles Canyon has an off-road course in the over 400 acres (160 ha) of land next door. The facility also contains a clubhouse, classrooms, and garages for members.

The track provides the local car and motorcycle community a safe place to drive or ride fast through its membership, performance driving days, and SCCA's Track Night in America. Racing series held here include SCCA and NASA events, 24 Hours of Lemons, LATAM Challenge Series, and CMRA series.
