= Giancarlo Serenelli =

Venezuelan racing driver (born 1981)

- Nationality: (Venezuela) Venezuelan
- Born: 10 July 1981 (age 45) Caracas (Venezuela)

Previous series
- 2013 2012 2012 2011 2008–11 2006–07 2005 2001 1997, 2000, 02: Indy Lights; GP2 Series; Auto GP World Series; SEAT Leon Supercopa Mexico; LATAM Challenge Series; Formula Renault 2000 de America; Eurocup Formula Renault 2.0; Formula Renault 2.0 Italia; Formula Ford Venezuela

Championship titles
- 2008, 10–11 2000, 02: LATAM Challenge Series; Formula Ford 2000 Venezuela

Giancarlo "Gato" Serenelli Pellecchia (born 10 July 1981 in Caracas) is a Venezuelan racing driver.

== Career ==
After karting, Serenelli raced in Formula Ford in his native Venezuela, winning his first title in 2000. After racing in the Italian Formula Renault Championship in 2001, he reclaimed the Formula Ford title in 2002.

In 2007, Serenelli finished runner-up in the Formula Renault Panam GP series, with two wins from the nine races. In 2008, he won the LATAM Challenge Series, and after finishing runner-up in 2009 he won the title again in both 2010 and 2011.

In 2012, Serenelli returned to European competition, signing to race in the Auto GP World Series for Ombra Racing. He also signed to race in the GP2 Series with new team Venezuela GP Lazarus, where his team-mate was first Fabrizio Crestani and then Sergio Canamasas. After nine rounds of the championship, he was replaced by René Binder.

Serenelli signed with Belardi Auto Racing to make his debut in the Firestone Indy Lights series at the Mid-Ohio Sports Car Course in August 2013. He continued with the team, competing in the final four races of the season and finished tenth in points. His best finish was three seventh-place finishes in the final three races.

== Racing record ==
=== Career summary ===
Season	Series	Team	Races	Wins	Poles	F/Laps	Podiums	Points	Position
1997	Formula Ford 1600 Venezuela		?	?	?	?	?	?	**2nd**
2000	Formula Ford 2000 Venezuela		?	?	?	?	?	?	**1st**
2001	Formula Renault 2000 Italia	Drumel Motorsport	8	0	0	0	0	0	NC
2001	Formula Renault 2000 Italia	LT Motorsport	8	0	0	0	0	0	NC
2002	Formula Ford 2000 Venezuela		?	?	?	?	?	?	**1st**
2002	Formula Renault 2000 Italia	Facondini Racing	0	0	0	0	0	0	NC
2005	Eurocup Formula Renault 2.0	Cram Competition	4	0	0	0	0	0	45th
2006	Formula Renault 2000 de America	R/E Racing	3	0	0	0	0	14	19th
2007	Formula Renault 2000 de America	R/E Racing	9	2	2	1	7	176	**2nd**
2008	LATAM Challenge Series	R/E Racing	16	7	3	4	12	362	**1st**
2009	LATAM Challenge Series	R/E Racing	18	4	5	6	10	318	**2nd**
2010	LATAM Challenge Series	R/E Racing	18	5	2	6	12	356	**1st**
2011	LATAM Challenge Series	R/E Racing	18	7	0	6	10	268	**1st**
2011	Super Copa León México	PDVSA	16	2	1	1	7	1285	**3rd**
2012	GP2 Series	Venezuela GP Lazarus	18	0	0	0	0	0	33rd
2012	Auto GP World Series	Ombra Racing	12	0	0	0	0	34	12th
2013	Firestone Indy Lights	Belardi Auto Racing	4	0	0	0	0	97	10th

=== Complete Eurocup Formula Renault 2.0 results ===
(key) (Races in bold indicate pole position; races in italics indicate fastest lap)

Year	Entrant	1	2	3	4	5	6	7	8	9	10	11	12	13	14	15	16	DC	Points
2005	Cram Competition	ZOL; 1	ZOL; 2	VAL; 1	VAL; 2	LMS; 1	LMS; 2	BIL; 1	BIL; 2	OSC; 1	OSC; 2	DON; 1	DON; 2	EST; 1 Ret	EST; 2; 24	MNZ; 1; 20	MNZ; 2 Ret	45th	0

=== Complete Auto GP World Series results ===
(key) (Races in bold indicate pole position) (Races in italics indicate fastest lap)

Year	Entrant	1	2	3	4	5	6	7	8	9	10	11	12	13	14	Pos	Points
2012	Ombra Racing	MNZ; 1; 9	MNZ; 2; 8	VAL; 1; 11	VAL; 2; 12	MAR; 1; 11	MAR; 2; 11	HUN; 1; 4	HUN; 2; 9	ALG; 1; 10	ALG; 2; 6	CUR; 1	CUR; 2	SON; 1; 6	SON; 2 Ret	12th	34

=== Complete GP2 Series results ===
(key) (Races in bold indicate pole position) (Races in italics indicate fastest lap)

Year	Entrant	1	2	3	4	5	6	7	8	9	10	11	12	13	14	15	16	17	18	19	20	21	22	23	24	DC	Points
2012	Venezuela GP Lazarus	SEP; FEA; 23	SEP; SPR; 20	BHR1; FEA; 18	BHR1; SPR; 21	BHR2; FEA; 22	BHR2; SPR; 21	CAT; FEA; 25	CAT; SPR; Ret	MON; FEA; 22	MON; SPR; Ret	VAL; FEA; Ret	VAL; SPR; 16	SIL; FEA; 19	SIL; SPR; 16	HOC; FEA; 24	HOC; SPR; Ret	HUN; FEA; 20	HUN; SPR; 22	SPA; FEA	SPA; SPR	MNZ; FEA	MNZ; SPR	MRN; FEA	MRN; SPR	33rd	0

=== Indy Lights ===
Year	Team	1	2	3	4	5	6	7	8	9	10	11	12	Rank	Points	Ref
2013	Belardi Auto Racing	STP	ALA	LBH	INDY	MIL	IOW	POC	TOR	MOH; 11	BAL; 7	HOU; 7	FON; 7	**10th**	**97**	
