= Panam GP Series =

Racing series

- Category: Formula Abarth
- Country: (Mexico) Latin America
- Inaugural season: 2002
- Constructors: Tatuus
- Engine suppliers: Fiat
- Tyre suppliers: Hankook
- Drivers' champion: (Mexico) Alain Fernández
- Official website: panamgpseries.com

The Panam GP Series is the replacement of the Mexican Formula Three Championship. In 2002 began as Mexican Formula Renault, but in 2005 started an internationalization process in Central America and North of South America. In 2008, the series fell in hiatus. Some people started the LATAM Challenge Series with the same cars. In 2012, the revival ran with Formula Abarth cars.

== Venues ==
Venue	Location	Races
Autódromo Hermanos Rodríguez	(Mexico) México City	2
Autódromo Miguel E. Abed	(Mexico) Puebla	2
Autódromo del Águila	(Mexico) Morelia	3
Autódromo Guadalajara	(Mexico) Guadalajara	2
Autódromo Monterrey	(Mexico) Monterrey	2
Autódromo San Luis 400	(Mexico) San Luis Potosí	1
Autódromo Internacional de Zacatecas	(Mexico) Zacatecas	1
Autódromo Los Volcanes	(Guatemala) Escuintla	3
Autódromo La Guácima	(Costa Rica) Alajuela	3
Autodromo Internacional de Yahuarcocha	(Ecuador) Ibarra	2
Autódromo de Tocancipá	(Colombia) Tocancipá	2
Caribbean International Motorsports Park	(Puerto Rico) Ponce	1
Autódromo de Turagua	(Venezuela) Aragua	1

== Champions ==
=== 2000 Series ===
Season	Champion	Team Champion	Chassis	Tyres
Mexican Formula Renault Championship
2002	(Mexico) David Martínez		Tatuus	M
2003	(Mexico) Homero Richards		Tatuus	M
2004	(Mexico) Homero Richards	(Mexico) Nextel	Tatuus	M
Formula Renault 2.0 Panam GP Series
2005	(Mexico) Germán Quiroga		Tatuus	M
2006	(Mexico) Homero Richards	(Mexico) Estral	Tatuus	M
2007	(Mexico) Hugo Oliveras	(Mexico) FedEx-Citizen	Tatuus	K
2008	(Mexico) Xavier Razo	(cancelled mid-season)		

=== 1600 Series ===
Season	Champion	Team Champion	Chassis	Tyres
2005	(Mexico) Picho Toledano	Nextel	Tatuus	M
2006	(Colombia) Juan E. Jacobo	Roshfrans Colombia	Tatuus	M
2007	(Mexico) Gerardo Nieto		Tatuus	K

=== Panam GP Series ===
Season	Full series name	Champion	Team Champion	Chassis	Tyres
2012	Formula Panam GP Series – Fórmula Abarth	(Ecuador) Sebastián Merchán	Team Costa Rica	Tatuus	Kenda
2013	Santander Panam GP Series	(Mexico) Rudy Camarillo	(Mexico) Team ROCA ACERO	Tatuus	H
2014	F3Panam powered by ABARTH Spring Series	(Mexico) Miguel Alejandro Pérez	?	Tatuus	H
2014	F3Panam powered by ABARTH	Cancelled			
2015	Fórmula Panam	(Mexico) Giancarlo Vecchi		Tatuus	H
2016	Fórmula Panam	(Mexico) Axel Matus		Tatuus	H
2017	Fórmula Panam	(Mexico) Manuel Cabrera		Tatuus	H
2018	Fórmula Panam	(Mexico) Alain Fernández		Tatuus	H

== See also ==
- 2015–16 NACAM Formula 4 season
- LATAM Challenge Series
