= Autódromo Guadalajara =

Motorsport venue in Mexico

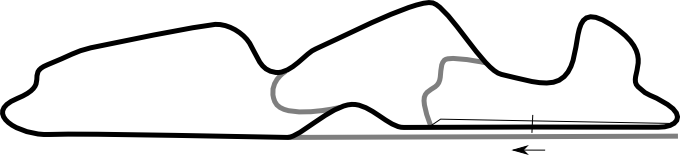
- Full Circuit (1993–present)
- Location: Guadalajara, Jalisco
- Coordinates: 20°32′02″N 103°20′42″W
- Owner: DIPSA
- Opened: 1993
- Former names: Autódromo de Toluquilla
- Major events: Former: Panam GP Series (2004, 2006, 2016); LATAM Challenge Series (2008–2009, 2012–2013)

Full Circuit (1993–present)
- Surface: Asphalt
- Length: 2.414 km (1.500 mi)
- Turns: 16

Autódromo Guadalajara is a 2.414 km (1.500 mi) motorsport venue located south of Guadalajara, Jalisco, Mexico, near Guadalajara International Airport. The racetrack was opened in 1993.

In the autodrome, "arrancones" races are regularly held on the main straight of the circuit.
