= MSR Houston =

MotorSport Ranch Houston Motor Sports Raceway Houston
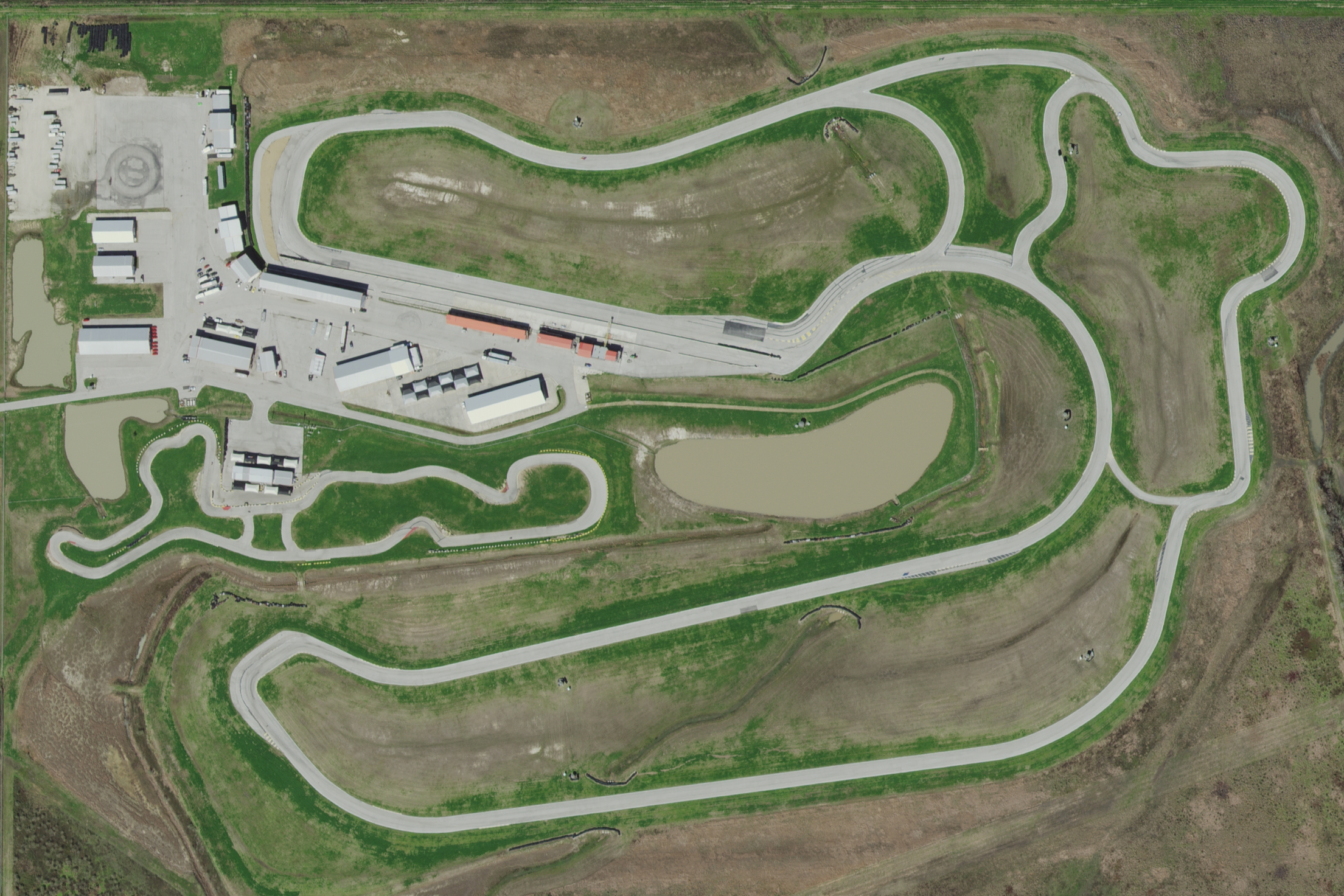
- MSR Houston in 2015
- Location: Angleton, Texas, USA
- Coordinates: 29.27811°N 95.42244°W
- Address: 1 Performance Dr; Angleton, TX 77515
- Opened: December 2005
- Major events: HPDE, SCCA, NASA, 24 Hours of Lemons
- Website: msrhouston.com

Main Course
- Surface: Paved
- Length: 2.38 mi (3.83 km)
- Turns: 17
- Race lap record: 1:10.040 (Will Power, Team Australia, 2007, Champ Car - DP01)

Karting Track
- Length: 0.75 mi (1.2 km)
- Turns: 17

Motor Speedway Resort (MSR) Houston is a road course race track located in Angleton, Texas, United States, about 35 miles (56 km) south of Houston. The track uses a membership system similar to that of country clubs where members may use the course for a nominal fee per use. The track has recently begun hosting its own racing series for club members.

The main 17-turn 2.38 miles (3.83 km) track is 40 ft (12 m) wide and driven counter-clockwise (typical) or clockwise. The facility has a separate 0.75 miles (1.2 km) banked-turn karting course also with 17 turns, a rally track 100 acres (0.40 km^{2}) in size, and a 90,000 sq ft (8,400 m^{2}) skidpad.

The course is also often used for track rentals that may involve professional race teams, particularly those in various sports car series as well as the IndyCar Series and Atlantic Championship.

MSR Houston is the home of the following: Hands On Driving Academy, DESports Racing, WildWing America, Tramontana America, and Spec Racer Sports.
