= Autódromo Miguel E. Abed =

Race track

Autódromo Internacional Miguel E. Abed

- International Road Course (2006–present)

- International Short Course/Formula E Circuit (2006–present)
- Location: Amozoc, near Puebla, Mexico
- Coordinates: 19°01′48″N 97°59′17″W
- Capacity: 42,500
- FIA Grade: 3 (International Course)
- Opened: 1985
- Major events: Current: NASCAR Mexico Series; Puebla 240 (2006–2015, 2017–present); NASCAR Mikel's Truck Series (2017–present); NACAM F4 (2015–2016, 2018–2020, 2022–present); Former: Formula E Puebla ePrix (2021); WTCC Race of Mexico (2005–2006, 2008–2009); Fórmula Panam (2005–2006, 2013, 2015–2018); LATAM Challenge Series (2008–2013); Formula BMW Americas (2009); Mexican Formula Three Championship (1990–1995)
- Website: http://www.autodromomabed.com

International Road Course (2006–present)
- Length: 3.363 km (2.090 mi)
- Turns: 16
- Race lap record: 1:25.465 ( (Mexico) Mariano del Castillo, Tatuus FA010, 2018, Formula Abarth)

International Short Course/Formula E Circuit (2006–present)
- Length: 2.982 km (1.853 mi)
- Turns: 15
- Race lap record: 1:23.322 ( (Mexico) Homero Richards, Tatuus FR2000, 2009, Formula Renault 2.0)

Oval (1995–present)
- Length: 2.060 km (1.280 mi)
- Turns: 4
- Race lap record: 0:38.362 ( (Mexico) Salvador de Alba Jr., Ford Fusion NASCAR, 2022, Stock car racing)

Road Course (2005)
- Length: 3.130 km (1.945 mi)
- Turns: 15
- Race lap record: 1:28.010 ( (Mexico) Diego Fernández, Tatuus FR2000, 2005, Formula Renault 2.0)

The Autódromo Internacional Miguel E. Abed is a motorsport race track located in Amozoc, 30-kilometre (19 mi) east of Puebla city, in the Mexican state of Puebla. The circuit has a capacity for 42,500 spectators.

== History ==
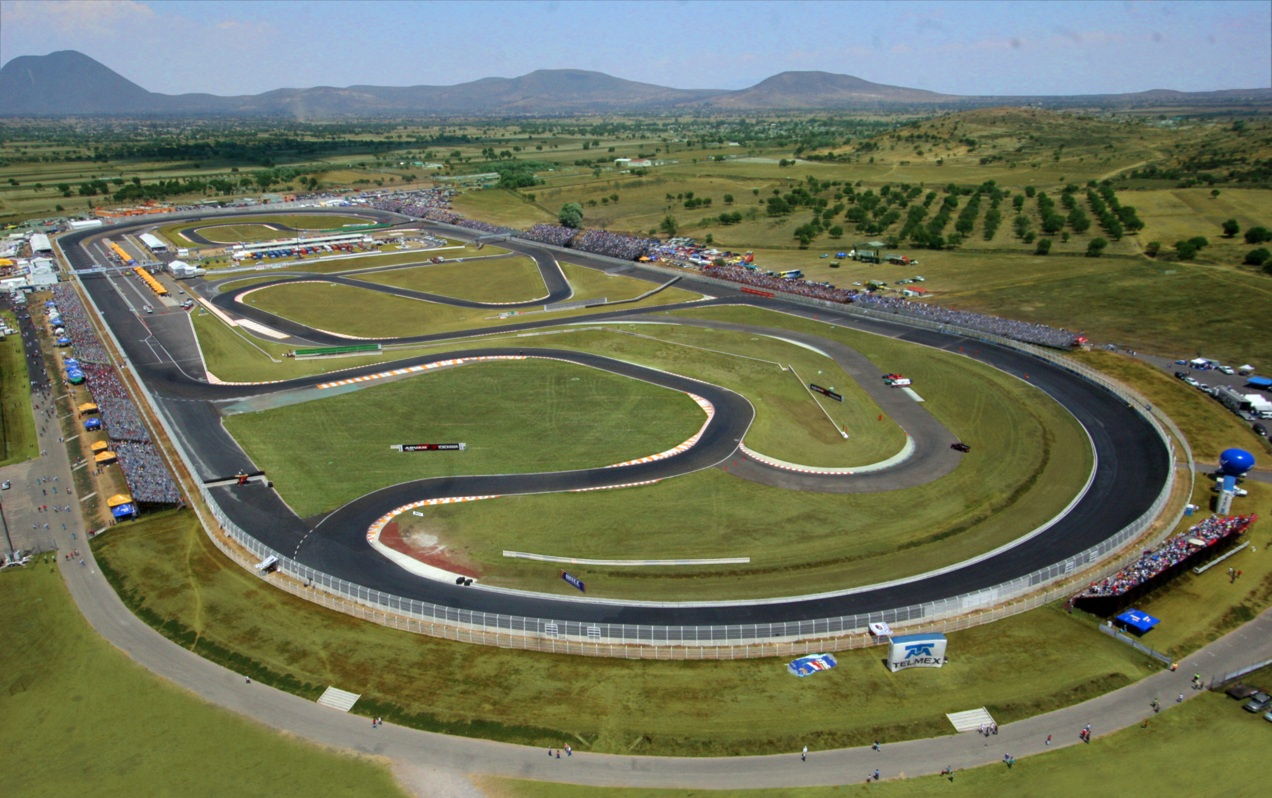
Aerial view

It was opened in 1985 and considered to be one of Mexico's premier racing facilities. It features a road course and a 2.060 km (1.280 mi) oval. The track held three World Touring Car Championship events in 2005, 2006 and 2008.

The FIA WTCC Race of Mexico was a round of the World Touring Car Championship, held at the Autódromo Miguel E. Abed near the city of Puebla in Mexico.

The race was first run in the 2005 season, the first season of the revived series. This year, the race was almost cancelled because circuit was not ready to hold a competition. It was run every year between 2005 and 2009 except in the 2007 season, when the planned event was cancelled due to problems with the Puebla circuit, although these problems were addressed for 2008. The events were run in June 2005, July 2006, April 2008 and March 2009 respectively. The 2010 running was cancelled due to security fears in the region.

The annual 24 Hours of Mexico race is held at the track since 2006.

The circuit facilities are the most important of the country. It opens to every kind of events including: Test Driving, Driving Experiences, Track Days, 0 to 60 series, Helicopter Experience, Corporate Events, Driving School and Go-Kart circuit.

== Layouts ==
The track has 18 possible layouts, and several has been used for different events. WTCC used one configuration in 2005, and other in 2006, 2008, and 2009. Then NASCAR Mexico Series has used the oval in 12 races and other configuration one time. LATAM Challenge Series has used several layouts for this circuit.

=== Layout configurations ===
Autódromo Miguel E. Abed layout configurations
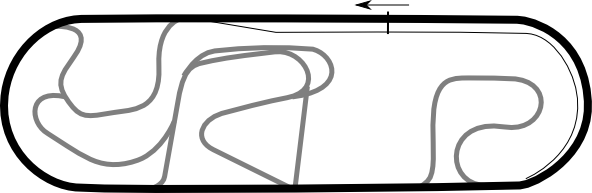
Oval (1995–present)

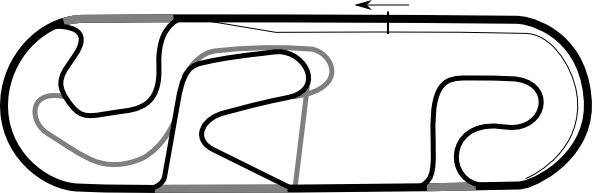
International Road Course (2006–present)

International Short Course/Formula E Circuit (2006–present)

=== The oval track ===
This is a counter-clockwise paperclip oval with two long straights of 650 m (710 yd), and curves with a radius of 118 m (129 yd). The main event in this track is the Puebla 240, a race of the NASCAR Mexico Series. For the 2018 season, Puebla is on the discussion for a possible IndyCar Series race.

=== The touring car circuit ===
Autódromo Internacional Miguel E. Abed is based on an American style oval with long banked turns and then a twisty, technical infield which is similar to Autódromo Internacional de Curitiba with an extremely rough surface. It has no camber worth noticing on the infield part and elevation change. There is a compromise to the setup of the touring car on the touring car circuit whether it goes fast on the infield (requires more downforce) or goes fast on the oval part (requires more speed). Touring car winning on this circuit requires smart driving as much as sheer speed, tyre wear control (because of the rough surface) and strategy.

=== Formula E circuit ===
On 22 April 2021, it was announced that Autódromo Miguel E. Abed would host a Formula E race in Mexico instead of Autódromo Hermanos Rodríguez, as it was being used as a field hospital due to the COVID-19 pandemic in Mexico. The event was called as Puebla ePrix and held on the dates of 19–20 June 2021.

On 14 June 2021, the Formula E circuit layout was revealed, in which the layout was very similar to the WTCC layout except following a tighter hairpin after T3 and rejoining the WTCC layout at T6 within an infield loop; and also the layout included attack mode activation zone as the 'joker lap' alternate route different than other Formula E circuits.

== Events ==
Current

- March: NACAM Formula 4 Championship 500 KM Puebla, TCR Mexico Series
- May: NASCAR Mexico Series, NASCAR Mikel's Truck Series
- August: NASCAR Mexico Series, NASCAR Mikel's Truck Series
- September: NACAM Formula 4 Championship 6H Puebla, TCR Mexico Series
- October: NACAM Formula 4 Championship, TCR Mexico Series
- November: Gran Turismo Mexico

Former

- Formula BMW Americas (2009)
- Formula E
  - Puebla ePrix (2021)
- Fórmula Panam (2005–2006, 2013, 2015–2018)
- LATAM Challenge Series (2008–2013)
- Fórmula de las Américas/Mexican Formula 3000 Championship (1988–1989, 1994–1995)
- Mexican Formula Three Championship (1990–1995)
- World Touring Car Championship
  - FIA WTCC Race of Mexico (2005–2006, 2008–2009)

== Lap records ==
As of September 2025, the fastest official race lap records at the Autódromo Miguel E. Abed are listed as:

Category	Time	Driver	Vehicle	Event
International Road Course (2006–present): 3.363 km (2.090 mi)
Formula Abarth	1:25.465	Mariano del Castillo	Tatuus FA010	2018 Puebla Fórmula Panam round
Stock car racing	1:29.749	Homero Richards	Ford Fusion NASCAR	2017 Gran Premio Red Cola 120
Formula Renault 2.0	1:30.840	Giancarlo Serenelli	Tatuus FR2000 Renault	2009 1st Puebla LATAM Challenge round
Formula Vee	1:31.598	José Sandoval	Tatuus FR2000 Volkswagen	2012 Puebla LATAM Challenge round
Formula 4	1:31.704	Igor Fraga	Mygale M14-F4	2018 Puebla NACAM F4 round
Formula BMW	1:36.037	Alex Ellis	Mygale FB02	2009 Puebla Formula BMW Americas round
Super 2000	1:38.076	Andy Priaulx	BMW 320si	2009 FIA WTCC Race of Mexico
TCR Touring Car	1:39.646	Julio Rejón	Cupra León Competición TCR	2024 Puebla TCR Mexico round
International Short Course/Formula E Circuit (2006–present): 2.982 km (1.853 mi)
Formula Renault 2.0	1:23.322	Homero Richards	Tatuus FR2000	2009 2nd Puebla LATAM Challenge round
Formula Abarth	1:23.994	Giancarlo Vecchi	Tatuus FA010	2016 Puebla Fórmula Panam round
Formula 4	1:24.355	Alejandro Bobadilla	Tatuus F4-T421	2025 2nd Puebla NACAM F4 round
Formula E	1:25.172	Oliver Rowland	Nissan IM03	2021 Puebla ePrix
Short NASCAR Road Course (2006–present): 2.590 km (1.609 mi)
Stock car racing	1:02.622	Salvador de Alba Jr.	Ford Fusion NASCAR	2021 2nd Puebla NASCAR Mexico round
Long NASCAR Road Course (2006–present): 2.840 km (1.765 mi)
Stock car racing	1:18.360	José Luis Ramírez	Ford Fusion NASCAR	2019 Gran Premio Monster Energy
Oval (1995–present): 2.060 km (1.280 mi)
Stock car racing	0:38.362	Salvador de Alba Jr.	Ford Fusion NASCAR	2022 NASCAR Puebla Gran Final
International Road Course (2005): 3.130 km (1.945 mi)
Formula Renault 2.0	1:28.010	Diego Fernández	Tatuus FR2000	2005 Puebla Formula Renault 2000 America round
Super 2000	1:30.587	Gabriele Tarquini	Alfa Romeo 156 WTCC	2005 FIA WTCC Race of Mexico

== Fatalities ==
On June 14, 2009 during the 97th lap of a 100-lap NASCAR Mexico Series race at Autódromo Miguel E. Abed in Amozoc, Puebla, Carlos Pardo (September 16, 1975 – June 14, 2009) was hit by Jorge Goeters, which caused him to lose control of his car and he crashed sideways into the end of a lower retaining wall at over 200 km/h (120 mph). The car was virtually destroyed on impact. He was transported to a local hospital by helicopter, where he was pronounced dead. He was declared the winner of the race since he was leading the race at the last completed lap before the accident occurred, beating Goeters by 0.044 seconds. Pardo, driving for Motorcraft team, had started the race from the last row.
