= Amozoc de Mota =

Amozoc de Mota (municipality)
- Town

- Seal

- Location in Puebla Amozoc de Mota (municipality) (Mexico)
- Country: Mexico
- State: Puebla
- Municipality: Amozoc

Population (2020)
  - Total: 95,322
- Time zone: UTC-6 (Central Standard Time)

Amozoc de Mota is a city located in the Mexican state of Puebla, Mexico. Its borders are in the north, the Malintzin volcano; in the south, the "Sierra de Amozoc"; in the west, the Acajete municipal seat; and in the west, the capital of the State Puebla city. Amozoc city is the seventh largest in the State, of Puebla, with a 2020 census population of 125,876 inhabitants.

In Amozoc de Mota about 3,000 inhabitants speak indigenous languages: Nahuatl (1,482 inhabitants), Totonaco (776 inhabitants) and Mazateco (330 inhabitants).

While a small city, it has gained international relevance because it is the home of the Autódromo Miguel E. Abed, which hosts a World Touring Car Championship event.

== Notable people ==
- Ignacio Comonfort (1812-1863), president of Mexico from 1855-1858
