= 2025 NASCAR Mexico Series =

18th season of the NASCAR Mexico Series

The 2025 NASCAR Mexico Series was the eighteenth season of the NASCAR Mexico Series, a regional stock car racing series sanctioned by NASCAR in Mexico. It was the twenty-first season of the series as a NASCAR-sanctioned series. It began with a race at the Super Óvalo Potosino on 2 March and concluded with a race at the Autódromo Miguel E. Abed on 9 November.

Rubén García Jr. entered the season as defending champion, having won his fifth title in 2024.

Alex de Alba won his first Mexico Series championship.

== Regulation Changes ==
On 29 January, changes to the playoff format were announced. The total amount of playoff races (including the championship race) was increased from three to five – the round of 10 and round of 7 were both extended from one to two races.

== Teams and Drivers ==
The following is a list of drivers who competed in the NASCAR Mexico Series for 2025.

On 20 March, prior to the race in Chiapas, 2006 champion Rogelio López announced his retirement from motorsport following a 28-year career. At the time, he had amassed the joint-most victories in the series at 26.

(N) = Novice (Rookie)
Italicized = Part-time drivers

Manufacturer	Team/Owner	No.	Driver	Rounds
Chevrolet	Alessandros Racing	42	(Mexico) Juan Manuel González	1–2
Chevrolet	Alpha Racing	6	(Mexico) Rogelio López	2
Chevrolet	Alpha Racing	9	(Mexico) Eloy Sebastián (N)	All
Chevrolet	Codialub	76	(Mexico) Michael Dörrbecker (Note: Dörrbecker was absent from a few rounds due to duties with the International GT Open, however had still been eligible for the playoffs up until Round 8 in Monterrey.)	1–3, 5–7
Chevrolet	Escudería Telmex	1	(Mexico) Enrique Baca	All
Chevrolet	Escudería Telmex	2	(Mexico) Abraham Calderón	All
Chevrolet	HO Speed Racing	54	(Mexico) Omar Jurado	All
Chevrolet	JV Motorsports	7	(Mexico) Xavi Razo	All
Chevrolet	JV Motorsports	55	(Mexico) Julio Rejón	All
Chevrolet	Team GP	88	(Mexico) Rubén García Jr.	All
Ford	Alessandros Racing	28	(Mexico) Rubén Rovelo	All
Ford	Anvi Motor Sport	51	(Mexico) Jake Cosío	All
Ford	Car Motion	69	(Mexico) Germán Quiroga	All
Ford	HO Speed Racing	22	(Mexico) Santiago Tovar	All
Ford	ProRally	95	(Mexico) Rodrigo Rejón	All
Ford	Ramírez Racing	08	(Mexico) José Luis Ramírez	All
Ford	Sidral Aga Racing	14	(Mexico) Alex de Alba	All
Ford	Tame Racing	46	(Mexico) Irwin Vences	1–10
Ford	Tame Racing	15	(Mexico) Rubén Pardo	9
Ford	Team GP	23	(Mexico) Max Gutiérrez	All
Ford	Z Racing Team	31	(Mexico) Jorge Goeters	1, 3, 9–10, 14

== Schedule ==
On 16 December 2024, the official calendar for the 2025 season was announced, featuring 14 races across 13 weekends, including a doubleheader weekend with the NASCAR Cup Series and NASCAR Xfinity Series at Autódromo Hermanos Rodríguez. Compared to 2024, the final race would be held in Puebla instead of Mexico City.

Chihuahua was dropped from the schedule for undisclosed reasons, with Puebla gaining a third date as a replacement.

An international race had been confirmed for Panama for 13 September, but was later dropped for logistical reasons.

San Luis Potosí also had three dates on the 2025 calendar; its August date being a replacement for a previously scheduled race on Autódromo Hermanos Rodríguez's oval layout.

No.	Race title	Track	Location	Date
1	San Luis Capital 200	O Super Óvalo Potosino	San Luis Potosí City, San Luis Potosí	2 March
2	Chiapas Extraordinary By Nature 200	O Súper Óvalo Chiapas	Tuxtla Gutiérrez, Chiapas	23 March
3	Commscope 200 Puebla	R Autódromo Miguel E. Abed	Amozoc, Puebla	13 April
4	Aguascalientes El gigante de México 250	O Óvalo Aguascalientes México	Aguascalientes City, Aguascalientes	18 May
5	Querétaro 200	O Autódromo de Querétaro	El Marqués, Querétaro	1 June
6	Ricardo Rodríguez 60	R Autódromo Hermanos Rodríguez	Mexico City	13 June
7	Pedro Rodríguez 60	R Autódromo Hermanos Rodríguez	Mexico City	14 June
8	Commscope 120	O Autódromo Monterrey	Apodaca, Nuevo León	5 July
9	Puebla 75	O Autódromo Miguel E. Abed	Amozoc, Puebla	20 July
Playoffs
Round of 10
10	San Luis Potosí 200	O Super Óvalo Potosino	San Luis Potosí City, San Luis Potosí	10 August
11	Querétaro 140	O Autódromo de Querétaro	El Marqués, Querétaro	21 September
Round of 7
12	La Potosina 200	O Super Óvalo Potosino	San Luis Potosí City, San Luis Potosí	5 October
13	Aguascalientes "El gigante de México" 170	O Óvalo Aguascalientes México	Aguascalientes City, Aguascalientes	19 October
Championship 4
14	Puebla 110	O Autódromo Miguel E. Abed	Amozoc, Puebla	9 November

O Oval Track
R Road course

== Race results ==
No.	Race title	Pole position	Most laps led	Winning Driver	Manufacturer
1	San Luis Capital 200	Julio Rejón	Julio Rejón	Rubén García Jr.	Chevrolet
2	Chiapas Extraordinary By Nature 200	Xavi Razo	Alex de Alba	Alex de Alba	Ford
3	Commscope 200	Alex de Alba	Xavi Razo	Xavi Razo	Chevrolet
4	Aguascalientes "El gigante de México" 250	Germán Quiroga	Xavi Razo	Xavi Razo	Chevrolet
5	Querétaro 200	Alex de Alba	Alex de Alba	Alex de Alba	Ford
6	Ricardo Rodríguez 60	Abraham Calderón	Max Gutiérrez	Max Gutiérrez	Chevrolet
7	Pedro Rodríguez 60	Santiago Tovar	Abraham Calderón	Abraham Calderón	Chevrolet
8	Commscope 120	Rubén García Jr.	Max Gutiérrez	Max Gutiérrez	Chevrolet
9	Puebla 75	Rubén Rovelo	Germán Quiroga	Germán Quiroga	Ford
10	San Luis Potosí 200	Alex de Alba	Alex de Alba	Julio Rejón	Chevrolet
11	Querétaro 140	Alex de Alba	Alex de Alba	Julio Rejón	Chevrolet
12	La Potosina 200	Max Gutiérrez	Alex de Alba	Alex de Alba	Ford
13	Aguascalientes "El gigante de México" 170	Abraham Calderón	Germán Quiroga	Germán Quiroga	Ford
14	Puebla 110	Rubén Rovelo	Rubén Rovelo	Rubén Rovelo	Ford

== 2025 NASCAR Challenge Series ==
The 2025 NASCAR Challenge Series is the ninth season of the NASCAR Challenge Series, a regional stock car racing series sanctioned by NASCAR in Mexico. It began with a race at the Super Óvalo Potosino on 2 March, and will conclude with a race at the Autódromo Miguel E. Abed on 9 November. The series is intended for young drivers, and acts as the second-tier series to the NASCAR Mexico Series.

Unlike most other second tier series in motorsport, NASCAR Challenge drivers race alongside NASCAR Mexico drivers in the same event.

The champion from 2024 was Eloy Sebastián, who would take part in the main division in 2025.

Diego Ortíz won the Challenge championship.

=== Teams and Drivers ===
The following is a list of teams and drivers who competed in the 2025 NASCAR Challenge Series season.

(N) = Novice (Rookie)
Italicized = Part-time drivers

Manufacturer	Team/Owner	No.	Driver	Rounds
Chevrolet	Alessandros Racing	26	(Mexico) Eliud Treviño	All
Chevrolet	Alessandros Racing	27	(Mexico) Oscar Torres	1
Chevrolet	Alessandros Racing	27	(Mexico) Helio Meza (N) (Note: Meza was absent from the opening race at San Luis Potosí due to duties with the Mazda MX-5 Cup.)	2–14
Chevrolet	Alessandros Racing	42	(Mexico) Chispa Rodriguez (N)	6
Chevrolet	Alpha Racing	18	(Mexico) Alonso Salinas (N)	All
Chevrolet	Anvi Motorsport	13	(Mexico) Rafael Maggio (N)	6–7
Chevrolet	Anvi Motorsport	39	(Mexico) Víctor Barrales Jr.	All
Chevrolet	Anvi Motorsport	62	(Mexico) Gustavo Barrales	1, 6–8, 12–14
Chevrolet	Anvi Motorsport	63	(Mexico) Marco Marín	11
Chevrolet	Dynamic Motorsports	10	(Mexico) Regina Sirvent	All
Chevrolet	Spartac Racing	0	(Mexico) Rafael Vallina	1–10
Chevrolet	Tame Racing	77	(Mexico) Majo Rodriguez	5, 9, 14
Chevrolet		3	(Mexico) Carlos Novelo (N)	6
Ford	Escudería Telmex	8	(Mexico) Esteban Rodríguez	All
Ford	HO Speed Racing	11	(Mexico) Diego Ortíz	All
Ford	HO Speed Racing	29	(Mexico) Koke De la Parra	All
Ford	JV Motorsports	75	(Mexico) Giancarlo Vecchi	All
Ford	Tyson Motorsport	16	(Mexico) Rodrigo Maggio (N)	1–7, 9–14
Ford	Z Racing Team	44	(Mexico) Santos Zanella Sr.	1–8, 10–11
Ford	Z Racing Team	44	(Mexico) Franco Zanella	9
Ford	Z Racing Team	52	(Mexico) Santos Zanella Jr.	All

=== Race results ===
No.	Race title	Pole position	Most laps led	Winning driver	Manufacturer
1	San Luis Capital 200	Giancarlo Vecchi	Giancarlo Vecchi	Giancarlo Vecchi	Ford
2	Chiapas Extraordinary By Nature 200	Giancarlo Vecchi	Víctor Barrales	Víctor Barrales	Chevrolet
3	Commscope 200	Helio Meza	Koke de la Parra	Koke de la Parra	Chevrolet
4	Aguascalientes "El gigante de México" 250	Diego Ortíz	Diego Ortíz	Diego Ortíz	Ford
5	Querétaro 200	Helio Meza	Helio Meza	Helio Meza	Chevrolet
6	Ricardo Rodríguez 60	Helio Meza	Helio Meza	Helio Meza	Chevrolet
7	Pedro Rodríguez 60	Diego Ortíz	Helio Meza	Diego Ortíz	Ford
8	Commscope 120	Helio Meza	Koke de la Parra	Giancarlo Vecchi	Ford
9	Puebla 75	Helio Meza	Helio Meza	Helio Meza	Chevrolet
10	San Luis Potosí 200	Helio Meza	Helio Meza	Diego Ortíz	Ford
11	Querétaro 140	Helio Meza	Helio Meza	Helio Meza	Chevrolet
12	La Potosina 200	Víctor Barrales	Víctor Barrales	Diego Ortíz	Ford
13	Aguascalientes "El gigante de México" 170	Helio Meza	Helio Meza	Diego Ortíz	Ford
14	Puebla 110	Helio Meza	Helio Meza	Diego Ortíz	Ford

== Standings ==
=== Scoring Format ===
Position	1	2	3	4	5	6	7	8		41	42	43	Bonus Points	
Race	43 (+3)	42	41	40	39	38	37	36	...	3	2	1	Pole position	1
Stage (Reg)	3	2	1										Leading a lap	1
Stage (Playoffs)	2	1	0.5										Most laps led	1

=== 2025 Standings ===
(key) Bold – Pole position. * – Most laps led. ^{S} – Stage winner.

. – Eliminated after Round of 10
. – Eliminated after Round of 7

NASCAR Mexico Series
Pos.	Driver	SLP	TGZ	PUE	AGS	QRO	CDMX		MTY	PUE	SLP	QRO	SLP	AGS	PUE	Points
1	Alex de Alba	30	1*	**2**	12^{S}	**1*^{S}**	7	3	3	8	**12*^{S}**	**3*^{S}**	1*^{S}	7	4	1st
2	Max Gutiérrez	20	4	11	15	5	1*^{S}	6	1*^{S}	5	3	7	**12**	2	5	2nd
3	Julio Rejón	**12*^{S}**	5	23	8	3	10	4	26	30	1	1	2	4	13	3rd
4	Germán Quiroga	7	6	5	**3**	27	11	11	6	1*	17	4	3	1*^{S}	22	4th
Playoff Cutoff
5	Eloy Sebastián **(N)**	5	2	3	14	22	15	7	4	28	4	6	5	3	2	500
6	Rubén Rovelo	3	28	19	2	6	3	5	2	**21**	10	27	4	6	**1*^{S}**	493
7	Xavi Razo	2	**3^{S}**	1*^{S}	1*	25	8	28	5	2^{S}	24	2	17	23	3	488.5
8	Rubén García Jr.	1	24	4	4	10	5	2	**11**	10	28	9	6	24	23	457
9	Abraham Calderón	14	29	13	22	2	**6**	1*^{S}	25	4	6	25	9	**5**	14	446
10	Enrique Baca	24	18	15	11	11	4	9	12	11	11	17	26	18	6	423
11	Jake Cosío	6	19	16	10	19	14	23	17	16	7	19	10	17	16	408
12	José Luis Ramírez	27	25	7	6	16	9	16	24	6	27	5	24	22	20	390
13	Rodrigo Rejón	28	31	27	29	26	31	12	8	12	2	12	13	10	15	363
14	Omar Jurado	4	14	14	26	14	26	18	22	15	23	26	27	12	11	363
15	Santiago Tovar	29	7	18	13	12	27	**31**	20	9	30	10	22	11	18	359
16	Irwin Vences	25	21	6	18	30	34	10	7	22	29					240
17	Jorge Goeters	13		8						13	9				8	190
18	Michael Dörrbecker	21	30	29		17	24	24								119
19	Juan Manuel González	26	17													45
20	Rogelio López		27													17
21	Rubén Pardo									31						13

NASCAR Challenge Series
Pos.	Driver	SLP	TGZ	PUE	AGS	QRO	CDMX		MTY	PUE	SLP	QRO	SLP	AGS	PUE	Points
1	Diego Ortíz	9	10	30	**5*****^{S}**	8	29	**8^{S}**	21	29	5	11	7	8	7	1st
2	Helio Meza **(N)**		13	**12**	28	**4*^{S}**	**2*^{S}**	13*	**15**	**3*^{S}**	**8*^{S}**	**8*^{S}**	8	**13*^{S}**	**9*^{S}**	2nd
3	Santos Zanella Jr.	11	12	25	20	18	16	14	14	26	14	16	15	25	21	3rd
4	Giancarlo Vecchi	**8***	**16**	10	16	7	23	27	9	7	13	13	11^{S}	9	25	4th
Playoff Cutoff
5	Koke De la Parra	10	15^{S}	9*^{S}	9	13	13	22	10*^{S}	24	22	18	23	26	24	392.5
6	Víctor Barrales	15^{S}	8*	24	7	9	12	26	23	14	20	15	**18***	DSQ	26	372
7	Alonso Salinas **(N)**	18	11	26	21	29	21	19	13	18	15	22	21	16	19	348
8	Esteban Rodríguez	16	32	21	19	24	17	15	19	17	19	23	16	15	28	339
9	Regina Sirvent	33	9	22	24	15	18	29	27	20	16	24	25	19	17	318
10	Eliud Treviño	22	26	28	23	20	28	20	16	32	21	28	14	20	12	306
11	Rodrigo Maggio **(N)**	17	22	20	25	31	30	25		19	25	14	19	14	27	300
12	Santos Zanella Sr.	32	20	17	27	23	19	17	18		18	21				228
13	Rafael Vallina	19	23	31	17	28	25	21	29	27	26					194
14	Gustavo Barrales	31					20	30	28				20	21	29	129
15	Majo Rodríguez **(N)**					21				25					10	76
16	Rafael Maggio **(N)**						22	32								34
17	Marco Marín											20				24
18	Chispa Rodríguez **(N)**						32									23
19	Oscar Torres	23														21
20	Franco Zanella									23						21
21	Carlos Novelo **(N)**						33									21

== See also ==
- 2025 NASCAR Cup Series
- 2025 NASCAR Xfinity Series
- 2025 NASCAR Craftsman Truck Series
- 2025 ARCA Menards Series
- 2025 ARCA Menards Series East
- 2025 ARCA Menards Series West
- 2025 NASCAR Whelen Modified Tour
- 2025 NASCAR Canada Series
- 2025 NASCAR Euro Series
- 2025 NASCAR Brasil Series
- 2025 CARS Tour
- 2025 SMART Modified Tour
