= 2024 NASCAR Mexico Series =

17th season of the NASCAR Mexico Series

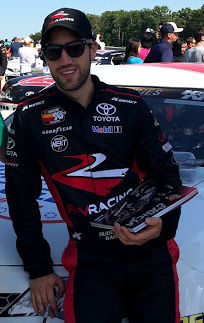
Rubén García Jr, the 2015, 2018, 2019, 2022 and 2024 champion, finished first in the championship

The 2024 NASCAR Mexico Series was the seventeenth season of the NASCAR Mexico Series, a regional stock car racing series sanctioned by NASCAR in Mexico. It is the twentieth season of the series as a NASCAR-sanctioned series. It began with the non-championship King Taco La Batalla En El Coliseo at Los Angeles Memorial Coliseum on 4 February, and ended with a race at Autódromo Hermanos Rodríguez on 2 November.

== Regulation Changes ==
=== Playoff Format ===
A revised format was announced for the 2024 season, which would include 10 playoff-eligible drivers compared to 6 in 2023.

All drivers with a win would now qualify for the playoffs, with the remaining positions being determined by the regular season points standings.

In the new format, the amount of playoff races would be increased from 2 to 3. After each of the first 2 races, the bottom three drivers would be eliminated. Those drivers would have their points reset to their regular season total, in addition to points that were accumulated throughout the two playoff races. In the final race, the highest finisher out of the remaining four drivers would be the champion of the season.

Drivers would have to compete in every regular season event to be eligible for the playoffs, similar to 2023. However, in the event of force majeure and/or clashes with international motorsport events, drivers would be allowed to miss up to two races and remain eligible for the playoffs; with approval from the series.

2024 Playoff Starting Pts. Distribution
Position	Points	Position	Points
1st	1010	6th	1005
2nd	1009	7th	1004
3rd	1008	8th	1003
4th	1007	9th	1002
5th	1006	10th	1001

=== Stage Racing ===
2024 saw the introduction of stage racing in the series, that had been used for NASCAR's three major domestic series since 2017.

All races would feature a mandatory caution at roughly the halfway point of the race - deemed a "stage break". During the caution, all teams would be allowed to make tire changes and refuel, in a non-competitive pit stop.

Additionally, the end of the stage would also reward points to the top three finishers:

Stage Points Distribution
	1st	2nd	3rd
During Reg. Season Races	3	2	1
During Playoff Races	2	1	0.5

== Schedule, results and standings ==
=== Schedule and race results ===
No.	Race title	Track	Location	Date	Winning driver
-	King Taco La Batalla En El Coliseo	Los Angeles Memorial Coliseum	Los Angeles, California, USA	4 February	Daniel Suárez
1	San Luis Potosi 200	Super Óvalo Potosino	San Luis Potosí City, San Luis Potosí	24 March	Rubén García Jr.
2	Nus Káh Chiapas 200	Súper Óvalo Chiapas	Tuxtla Gutiérrez, Chiapas	14 April	Abraham Calderón
3	Chihuahua 240	El Dorado Speedway	Juan Aldama, Chihuahua	4 May	Xavi Razo
4	Monterrey 120	Autódromo Monterrey	Apodaca, Nuevo León	25 May	Xavi Razo
5	Aguascalientes the Giant of México	Óvalo Aguascalientes México	Aguascalientes City, Aguascalientes	9 June	Andrés Pérez de Lara
6	Red Tail Grand Prize	Autódromo Miguel E. Abed	Amozoc, Puebla	7 July	Rubén García Jr.
7	San Luis Potosí 200	Super Óvalo Potosino	San Luis Potosí City, San Luis Potosí	21 July	Rubén García Jr.
8	Querétaro 140	Autódromo de Querétaro	El Marqués, Querétaro	11 August	Irwin Vences
9	Aguascalientes the Giant of México 250	Óvalo Aguascalientes México	Aguascalientes City, Aguascalientes	1 September	Xavi Razo
Playoffs
Round of 10
10	Queretaro 200	Autódromo de Querétaro	El Marqués, Querétaro	22 September	Xavi Razo
Round of 7
11	Red Tail Grand Prize	Autódromo Miguel E. Abed	Amozoc, Puebla	13 October	Alex de Alba
Championship 4
12	SpeedFest/La Gran Final	Autódromo Hermanos Rodríguez	Mexico City	2 November	Julio Rejón

== Standings ==
. – Eliminated after Round of 10
. – Eliminated after Round of 7

Pos.	Driver	SLP	TGZ	CHIH	MTY	AGS	PUE	SLP	QRO	AGS	QRO	PUE	CDMX	Points
1	Rubén García Jr.	1	10	6	3	7	1	1	18	4	6	2	4	1040
2	Xavi Razo	2	9	1	1	3	2	4	8	1	1	5	6	1038
3	Abraham Calderón	16	1	18	18	17	8	14	7	14	2	6	14	1019
4	Alex de Alba	3	18	7	6	2	17	6	2	5	4	1	15	1018
Playoff Cutoff
5	Irwin Vences	11	4	4	4	6	4	18	1	2	7	11	11	439
6	Julio Rejón	4	7	2	7	8	14	8	4	17	5	4	1	419.5
7	Max Gutiérrez	9	13	5	13	4	16	9	3	3	3	7	5	413.5
8	Santiago Tovar	6	11	12	2	11	3	15	10	12	10	3	7	412
9	Jake Cosío	8	6	13	10	18	5	7	6	10	8	8	2	405
10	Rogelio López	10	2	11	17	10	6	2	9	11	9	9	17	385
11	Germán Quiroga	5	3	14	12	5	11	11	5	18	12	10	8	372
12	Rubén Rovelo	13	17	10	8	13	10	3	12	8	18	13	3	360
13	Rodrigo Rejón	17	5	3	5	9	15	16	15	6	11	14	9	354
14	Michael Dörrbecker	12	15	15	16	15	7	10	11	13	13	12	16	312
15	Omar Jurado	20	16	9	11	12	9	13	13	7	14	17	12	309
16	Andrés Pérez de Lara	7	8		14	1	18	17	17		15	20	13	254
17	Jorge Goeters	15	12	16	15	16	12	12	14	15	16	16	19	245
18	José Luis Ramírez	19	19	17	9	14	13	5	16	16	19	19	10	243
19	Enrique Baca			8						9	17	15	18	128
20	Rubén Pardo	18	14											34
21	Salvador de Alba Jr.											18		18

== See also ==
- 2024 NASCAR Cup Series
- 2024 NASCAR Xfinity Series
- 2024 NASCAR Craftsman Truck Series
- 2024 ARCA Menards Series
- 2024 ARCA Menards Series East
- 2024 ARCA Menards Series West
- 2024 NASCAR Whelen Modified Tour
- 2024 NASCAR Canada Series
- 2024 NASCAR Whelen Euro Series
- 2024 NASCAR Brasil Sprint Race
- 2024 CARS Tour
- 2024 SMART Modified Tour
