= 2023 NASCAR Mexico Series =

16th season of the NASCAR Mexico Series

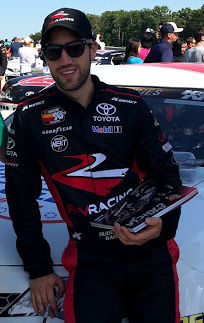
Rubén García Jr, the 2015, 2018, 2019 and 2022 champion, finished second in the championship

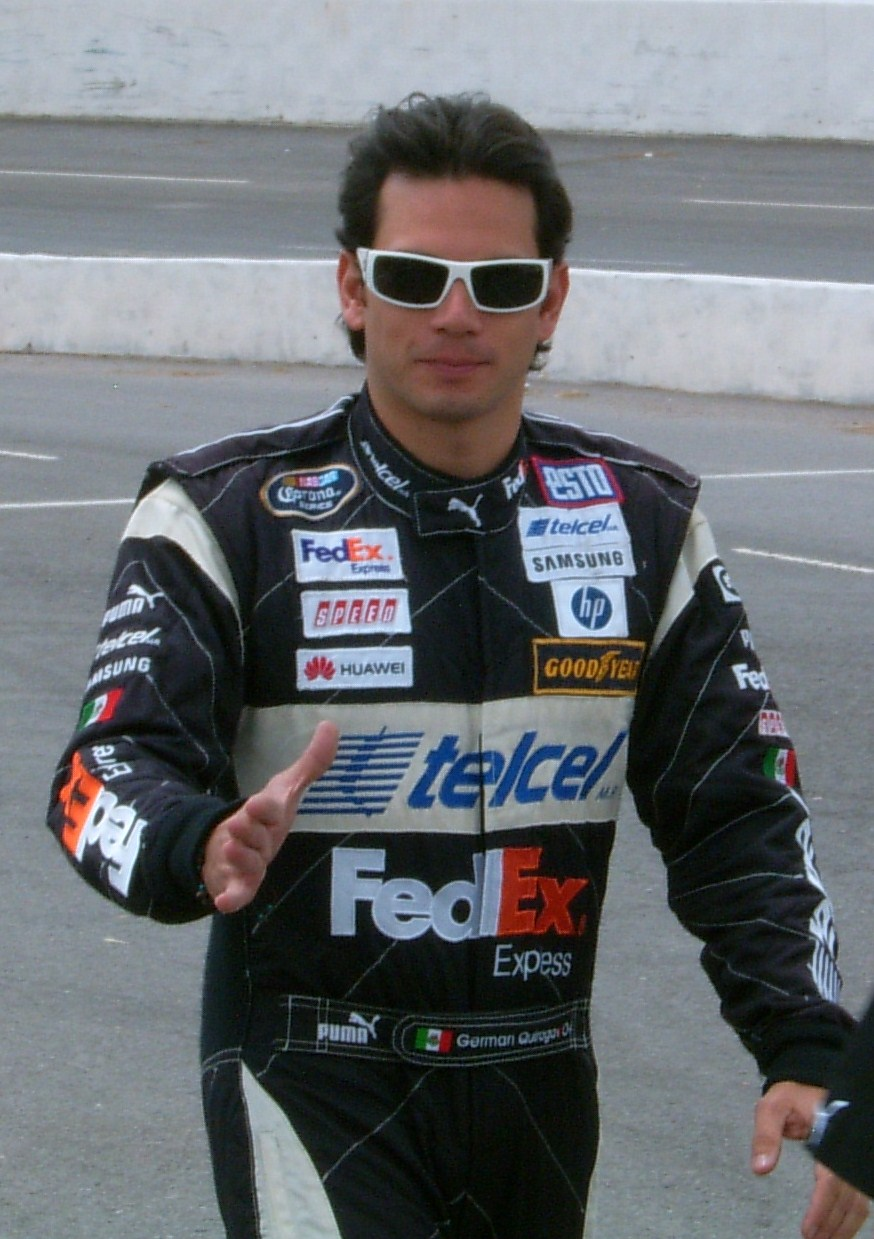
Germán Quiroga, the 2009, 2010 and 2011 champion, finished third in the championship

The 2023 NASCAR Mexico Series was the sixteenth season of the NASCAR Mexico Series, a regional stock car racing series sanctioned by NASCAR in Mexico. It was the nineteenth season of the series as a NASCAR-sanctioned series. It began with the Los Cabos 200 at Súper Óvalo Chiapas on 26 March and ended with a race at Autódromo Hermanos Rodríguez on 5 November. Salvador de Alba won the championship. It was his second championship in three years as he also won the 2021 series championship.

== Regulation Changes ==
=== Playoff Format ===
This was the first season in which a playoffs system would be used to determine the season's champion. In its first iteration in the NASCAR Mexico Series, a total of six drivers would qualify for the playoffs. This would include the top four drivers in the regular season points standings, along with two wildcard drivers with the most wins.

There would be two races in the playoffs - after the first race, the bottom two drivers in points would be eliminated, with the final four drivers competing to be the highest finisher in the last race of the season. This driver would be crowned the end-of-season champion.

2023 Playoffs Starting Pts. Distribution
Position	Points	Position	Points
1st	1015	4th	1003
2nd	1010	5th	1001
3rd	1006	6th	1000

== Schedule, results and standings ==
=== Schedule and race results ===
No.	Race title	Track	Location	Date	Winning driver
1	Los Cabos 200	Súper Óvalo Chiapas	Tuxtla Gutiérrez, Chiapas	26 March	Xavi Razo
2	Commscope 200	Super Óvalo Potosino	San Luis Potosí City, San Luis Potosí	16 April	Salvador de Alba
3	Chihuahua 240	El Dorado Speedway	Juan Aldama, Chihuahua	13 May	Rubén García Jr.
4	Querétaro 140	Autódromo del Ecocentro de la Unión Ganadera	El Marqués, Querétaro	28 May	Jake Cosío
5	El Gigante de México	Óvalo Aguascalientes México	Aguascalientes City, Aguascalientes	11 June	Salvador de Alba
6	Gran Premio Red Cola	Autódromo Miguel E. Abed	Puebla, Puebla	9 July	Salvador de Alba
7	Gran Premio Arzyz	Autódromo Monterrey	Apodaca, Nuevo León	29 July	Rubén García Jr.
8	San Luis Potosí 200	Super Óvalo Potosino	San Luis Potosí City, San Luis Potosí	13 August	Rubén García Jr.
9	El Gigante de México	Óvalo Aguascalientes México	Aguascalientes City, Aguascalientes	10 September	Julio Rejón
10	Gran Premio 240 Carvel	El Dorado Speedway	Juan Aldama, Chihuahua	23 September	Max Gutiérrez
Playoffs
11	Monster Energy 200 Puebla	Autódromo Miguel E. Abed	Puebla, Puebla	22 October	Julio Rejón
12	SpeedFest/La Gran Final	Autódromo Hermanos Rodríguez	Mexico City	5 November	Abraham Calderón

=== Drivers' championship ===
Pos.	Driver	Wins	Points
1	Salvador de Alba	3	444
Finalist Drivers
2	Germán Quiroga	0	433
3	Rubén García Jr.	3	416
4	Andrés Pérez de Lara	0	394
Non-Playoff Drivers
5	Max Gutiérrez	1	407
6	Abraham Calderón	1	380
7	Julio Rejón	2	377
8	Xavi Razo	1	363
9	Jake Cosío	1	357
10	Rogelio López	0	353
11	Santiago Tovar	0	350
12	Enrique Baca	0	350
13	Rubén Rovelo	0	318
14	Juan Manuel González	0	310
15	Miji Dörbecker	0	282
16	Jorge Goeters	0	276
17	José Luis Ramírez	0	272
18	Irwin Vences	0	251
19	Rubén Pardo	0	239
20	Omar Jurado	0	204
21	Héctor Aguirre	0	59

== See also ==
- 2023 NASCAR Cup Series
- 2023 NASCAR Xfinity Series
- 2023 NASCAR Craftsman Truck Series
- 2023 ARCA Menards Series
- 2023 ARCA Menards Series East
- 2023 ARCA Menards Series West
- 2023 NASCAR Whelen Modified Tour
- 2023 NASCAR Pinty's Series
- 2023 NASCAR Whelen Euro Series
- 2023 NASCAR Brasil Sprint Race
- 2023 SRX Series
- 2023 CARS Tour
- 2023 SMART Modified Tour
