= Germán Quiroga =

Mexican racing driver (born 1980)

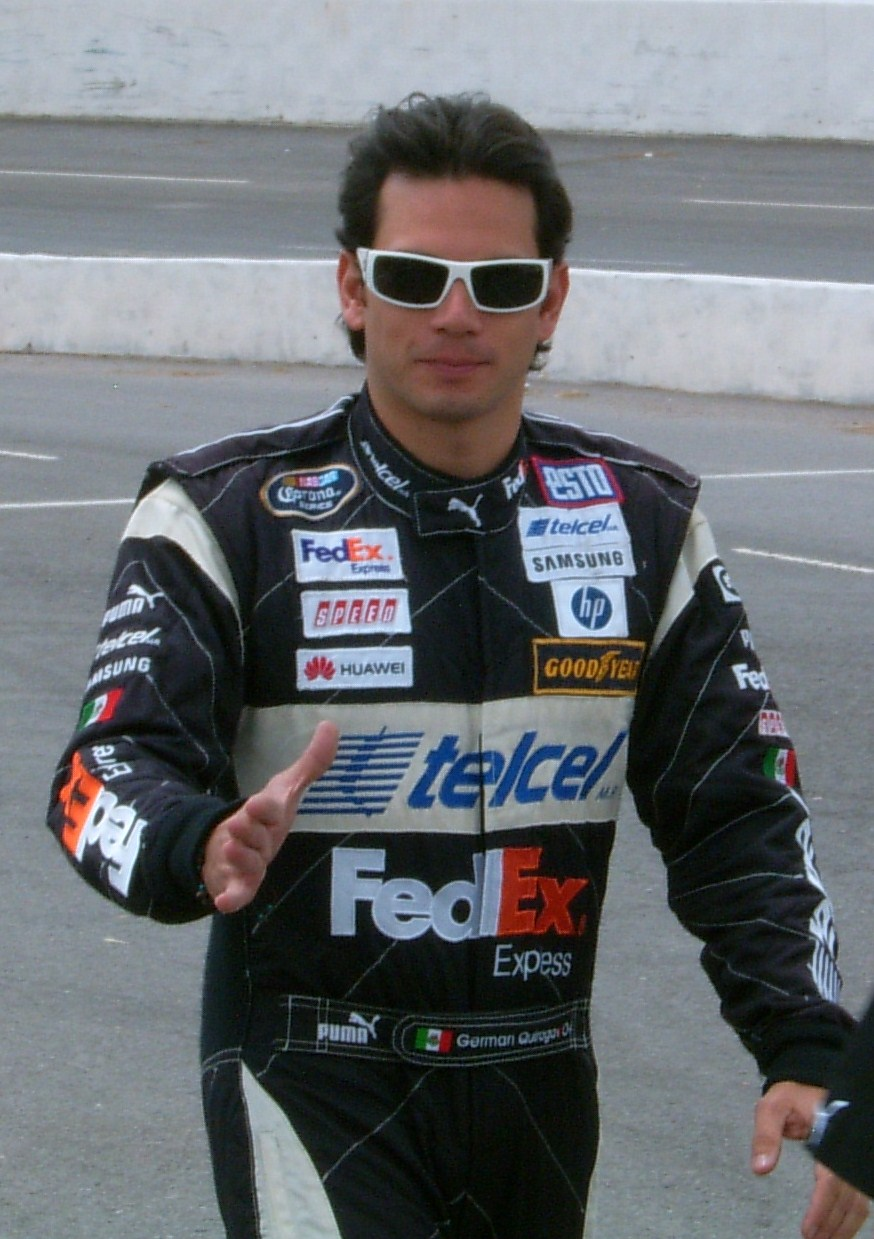
- Born: May 29, 1980 (age 46); Mexico City, Mexico
- Achievements: 2009, 2010, 2011 NASCAR Corona Series Champion; 2004 Mexican Formula Renault Champion

NASCAR O'Reilly Auto Parts Series career
- 1 race run over 1 year
- Best finish: 135th (2007)
- First race: 2007 Telcel-Motorola 200 (Autódromo Hermanos Rodríguez)
Wins	Top tens	Poles
0	0	0

NASCAR FedEx Freight Truck Series career
- 53 races run over 5 years
- 2016 position: 31st
- Best finish: 6th (2014)
- First race: 2011 F.W. Webb 175 (Loudon)
- Last race: 2016 Drivin' for Linemen 200 (Gateway)
Wins	Top tens	Poles
0	19	1

NASCAR Mexico Series career
- 148 races run over 12 years
- 2024 position: 11th
- Best finish: 1st (2009, 2010, 2011)
- First race: 2004 (Mexico City)
- Last race: 2025 Pedro Rodríguez 60 (Mexico City)
- First win: 2004 (San Luis Potosí)
- Last win: 2011 Aguascalientes 240 (Aguascalientes)
Wins	Top tens	Poles
17	112	11
- Statistics up to date as of June 29, 2025.

Germán Quiroga Jr. (born May 29, 1980) is a Mexican professional stock car racing driver who currently competes in NASCAR Mexico Series. In 2011, he became the first three-time NASCAR Corona Series champion.

== Racing career ==
=== Beginnings ===
Quiroga began his career in Reto Neon in 1996.

=== Corona Series ===
In 2004, Quiroga began racing in the NASCAR Corona Series (NCS), racing for Jorge Seman's race team . During the following year, he won the Formula Renault championship. In 2005, he drove in the Infiniti Pro Series before returning to Desafio Corona for 2006. His first championship in the Corona Series came in 2009, while racing for Equipo Telcel. He won the championship again in 2010 and 2011.

=== Toyota All-Star Showdown ===
In 2011, Quiroga participated in the Toyota All-Star Showdown in Irwindale, California, racing for Bill McAnally. He finished in the twelfth position behind fellow NCS driver Daniel Suárez.

=== Nationwide Series ===
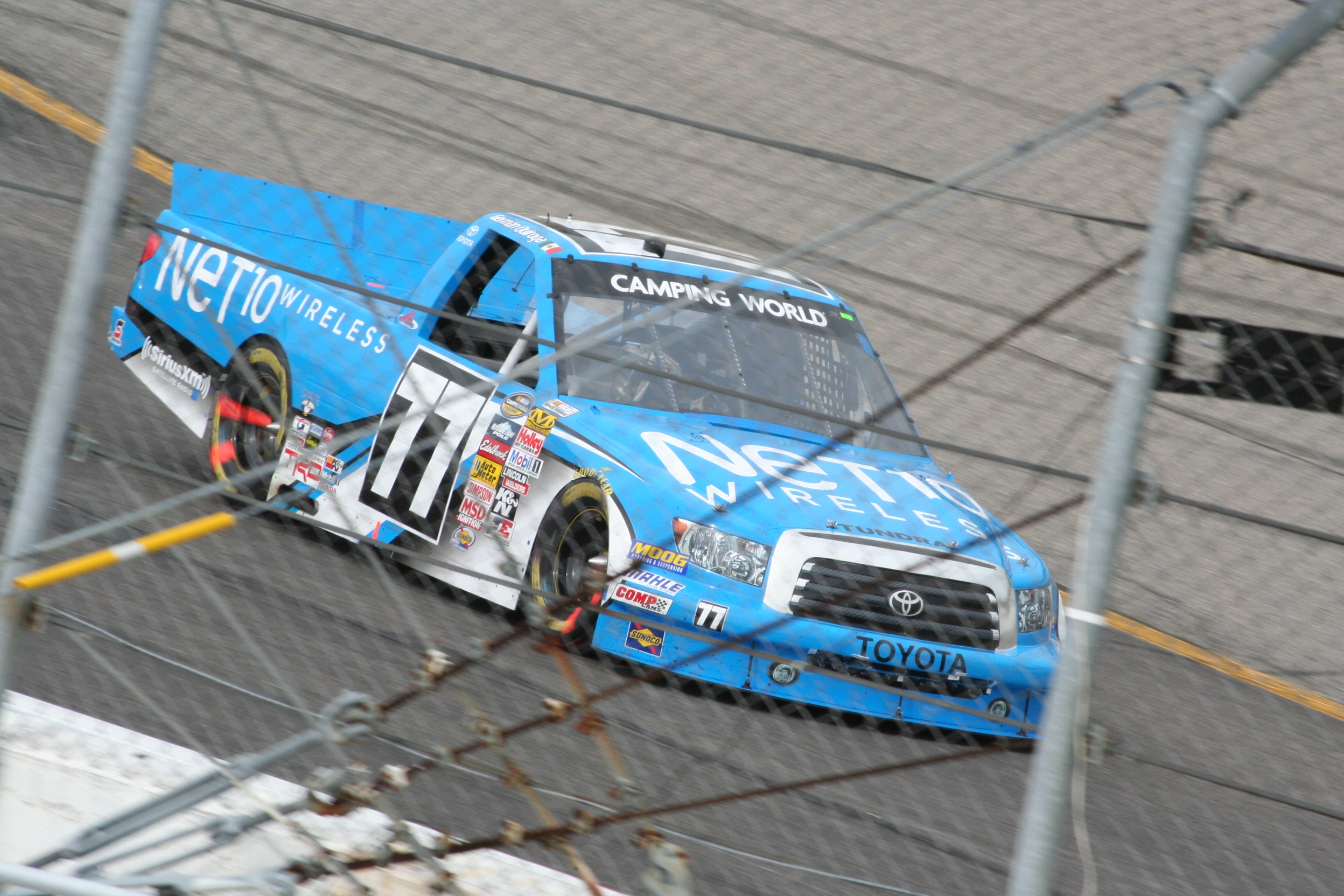
Quiroga's 2013 truck at Rockingham Speedway

Quiroga's first race in the NASCAR's national touring series came in 2007 in the Busch Series (now the Nationwide Series), competing in the series' then-annual event at Autódromo Hermanos Rodríguez for Jay Robinson Racing where he finished 28th.

=== Camping World Truck Series ===
Quiroga made his debut in the NASCAR Camping World Truck Series in 2011, competing in two events for Kyle Busch Motorsports at New Hampshire Motor Speedway and Homestead-Miami Speedway, with a best finish of 16th coming in his first race.

In 2012, Quiroga returned to KBM for a limited schedule of events, driving the No. 51 Toyota in four races at Talladega Superspeedway, Texas Motor Speedway, Phoenix International Raceway and Homestead. He moved to Red Horse Racing for the 2013 season, running the entire series schedule in an attempt to win the series' Rookie of the Year honors.

Quiroga also has worked part-time on NASCAR on NBC broadcasts, being part of mun2's broadcast of the NASCAR Toyota Series Toyota 120 at Phoenix International Raceway in February 2014.

Quiroga had a great start in 2014 season with five straight top-ten finishes until Texas.

After sitting out 2015, Quiroga returned to drive part-time in the Red Horse's No. 11 truck in 2016 beginning at Texas. Unfortunately, it was his final appearance in the championship as he failed to attract enough sponsors to continue.

=== Return to NASCAR Mexico ===
Quiroga returned to racing in 2021, joining the NASCAR Mexico field ten years after his last appearance in the category. He began in the No. 11 car to replace Hugo Oliveras, then switched to No. 69 midseason. He finished tenth in 2021, and twelfth the following season.

2023 was a far more positive season. Quiroga only finished outside the top ten once, and came close to winning the title, but was passed on the final lap of the final race. Therefore, he was crowned runner-up in the standings, despite not winning a race.

In 2024, Quiroga began the year with a top five and a podium. However, a handful of results outside of the top ten midseason, including a retirement in Aguascalientes, meant that he did not reach the playoffs and finished the season in eleventh overall.

Quiroga continued in the No. 69 car for the 2025 season, which started strong, with two top-tens and a top-five in Puebla. He qualified on pole in round four at Aguascalientes and went on to finish on the podium. With a pair of top ten finishes in the Mexico City double-header, he was eighth in the standings going into round eight in Monterrey.

== Motorsports career results ==
=== American open-wheel racing results ===
(key) (Races in bold indicate pole position, races in italics indicate fastest race lap)

==== Barber Dodge Pro Series ====
Year	1	2	3	4	5	6	7	8	9	10	Rank	Points
2002	SEB; 20	LRP; 16	LAG; 16	POR; 16	TOR; 15	CLE; 15	VAN; 8	MOH; 8	ROA; 6	MTL; 20	**16th**	**28**
2003	STP; 8	MTY; 8	MIL; 8	LAG; 9	POR; 5	CLE; 3	TOR; 12	VAN; 6	MOH; 15	MTL; 12	**7th**	**75**

==== Indy Pro Series ====
Year	Team	1	2	3	4	5	6	7	8	9	10	11	12	13	14	Rank	Points	Ref
2005	Kenn Hardley Racing	HMS	PHX	STP	INDY; 10	TXS	IMS	NSH	MIL	KTY	PPIR	SNM	CHI	WGL	FON	**25th**	**20**	

=== NASCAR ===
(key) (Bold – Pole position awarded by qualifying time. Italics – Pole position earned by points standings or practice time. * – Most laps led.)

==== Busch Series ====
NASCAR Busch Series results
Year	Team	No.	Make	1	2	3	4	5	6	7	8	9	10	11	12	13	14	15	16	17	18	19	20	21	22	23	24	25	26	27	28	29	30	31	32	33	34	35	NNSC	Pts	Ref
2007	Jay Robinson Racing	28	Chevy	DAY	CAL	MXC; 28	LVS	ATL	BRI	NSH	TEX	PHO	TAL	RCH	DAR	CLT	DOV	NSH	KEN	MLW	NHA	DAY	CHI	GTY	IRP	CGV	GLN	MCH	BRI	CAL	RCH	DOV	KAN	CLT	MEM	TEX	PHO	HOM	135th	84	

==== Camping World Truck Series ====
NASCAR Camping World Truck Series results
Year	Team	No.	Make	1	2	3	4	5	6	7	8	9	10	11	12	13	14	15	16	17	18	19	20	21	22	23	24	25	NCWTC	Pts	Ref
2011	Kyle Busch Motorsports	51	Toyota	DAY	PHO	DAR	MAR	NSH	DOV	CLT	KAN	TEX	KEN	IOW	NSH	IRP	POC	MCH	BRI	ATL	CHI	NHA; 16	KEN	LVS	TAL	MAR	TEX	HOM; 26	56th	46	
2012	Kyle Busch Motorsports	51	Toyota	DAY	MAR	CAR	KAN	CLT	DOV	TEX	KEN	IOW	CHI	POC	MCH	BRI	ATL	IOW	KEN	LVS	TAL; 8	MAR	TEX; 28	PHO; 24	HOM; 15				40th	101	
2013	Red Horse Racing	77	Toyota	DAY; 25	MAR; 29	CAR; 19	KAN; 11	CLT; 35	DOV; 13	TEX; 3	KEN; 8	**IOW**; 14	ELD; 20	POC; 3	MCH; 19	BRI; 21	MSP; 15	IOW; 6	CHI; 14	LVS; 21	TAL; 31	MAR; 7	TEX; 14	PHO; 12	HOM; 7				13th	625	
2014	Red Horse Racing	77	Toyota	DAY; 10	MAR; 6	KAN; 7	CLT; 9	DOV; 9	TEX; 23	GTY; 2	KEN; 15	IOW; 5	ELD; 12	POC; 22	MCH; 6	BRI; 14	MSP; 2	CHI; 19	NHA; 15	LVS; 16	TAL; 29	MAR; 10	TEX; 17	PHO; 26	HOM; 15				6th	683	
2016	Red Horse Racing	11	Toyota	DAY	ATL	MAR	KAN	DOV	CLT	TEX; 8	IOW; 14	GTW; 7	KEN	ELD	POC	BRI	MCH	MSP	CHI	NHA	LVS	TAL	MAR	TEX	PHO	HOM			31st	70	

==== Busch East Series ====
NASCAR Busch East Series results
Year	Team	No.	Make	1	2	3	4	5	6	7	8	9	10	11	12	13	NBESC	Pts	Ref
2007	Troy Williams Racing	21	Chevy	GRE; 26				STA; 28			MCM; 26	ADI	LRP; 29	MFD	NHA	DOV	31st	405	
2007	Troy Williams Racing	12	Chevy		ELK; DNQ	IOW	SBO										31st	405	
2007	Troy Williams Racing	21	Dodge						NHA; 33	TMP							31st	405	

==== Mexico Series ====
NASCAR Mexico Series results
Year	Team Owner	No.	Make	1	2	3	4	5	6	7	8	9	10	11	12	13	14	NCSC	Pts	Ref
2007	Monica Morales	5	Ford	PUE; 2	ZAC; 9	SLP; 2	MTY; 8	MXC; 1	ZAC; 3	QRO; 3	GDL; 2	SLP; 2	MTY; 24	PUE; 1	GDL; 1	QRO; 3	MXC; 1	2nd	2,296	
2008	Monica Morales	5	Ford	AGS; 10	MXC; 3	SLP; 22*	**GDL**; 12	ZAC; 3	PUE; 4	MTY; 3	SLP; 1	GDL; 6	PUE; 4	QRO; 4	SLP; 1*	TXG; 2*	MXC; 21	2nd	2,153	
2009	Monica Morales	2	Ford	AGS; 1*	TXG; 2*	SLP; 1*	PUE; 4	QRO; 9	**GDL**; 2	ZAC; 3	SLP; 3	PUE; 4	MTY; 1	QRO; 2	MXC; 12	TXG; 21	AGS; 2	1st	2,273	
2010	Monica Morales	2	Dodge	AGS; 23	QRO; 4	SLP; 5	TXG; 1	MXC; 2	PUE; 20	**GDL**; 2	MTY; 9	SLP; 1	MXC; 3	**QRO**; 2	PUE; 1	TXG; 15	AGS; 4	1st	2,173	
2011	Monica Morales	2	Toyota	MTY; 2	**SLP**; 4	AGS; 2												1st	2,272	
2011	Monica Morales	2	Dodge				TUX; 9	QRO; 12	PUE; 2	MXC; 3	**SLP**; 2*	MTY; 2	QRO; 1	PUE; 17	SLP; 1	AGS; 1	MXC; 5	1st	2,272	
2021	Lorena Valero	11	Ford	TUX; 15	QRO; 14	PUE; 12	AGS; 13											10th	313	
2021	Oscar Rodriguez Garcia	69	Chevy					SLP; 5	QRO; 10	MTY; 6	AGS; 12	SLP; 11	GDL; 5	PUE; 8	PUE; 13			10th	313	
2022	Oscar Rodriguez Garcia	69	Chevy	TUX; 8	QRO; 15	CHI; 3	GDL; 14	PUE; 4	SLP; 9	MTY; 5	AGS; 7	QRO	MXC; 6	MTY; 14	MXC; 10			12th	165	
2023	Oscar Rodriguez Garcia	69	Chevy	TUX; 8	SLP; 3	CHI; 5	QRO; 4	AGS; 3	PUE; 2	MTY; 8	SLP; 6	QRO; 17	CHI; 6	PUE; 5	MXC; 6			2nd	433	
2024	Oscar Rodriguez Garcia	69	Chevy	SLP; 5	TUX; 3	TUX; 14	MTY; 12	AGS; 5	PUE; 11	SLP; 14	QRO; 5	AGS; 18	QRO; 12	PUE; 10	MXC; 8			11th	372	
2025	Oscar Rodriguez Garcia	69	Chevy	SLP; 7	TUX; 6	PUE; 5	**AGS**; 3	QRO; 16	MXC; 10	MXC; 10	MTY	PUE	TBA	PAN	SLP	AGS	PUE	8th*	229*	

* Season still in progress
^{1} Ineligible for series points

Sporting positions
Preceded by Antonio Pérez	NASCAR Corona Series Champion; 2009, 2010, 2011	Succeeded by Jorge Goeters
Preceded by Homero Richards	Mexican Formula Renault Champion; 2004	Succeeded by Homero Richards
