= 2020 NASCAR PEAK Mexico Series =

13th season of the NASCAR Mexico Series

The 2020 NASCAR PEAK Mexico Series was the thirteenth season of the NASCAR Mexico Series, a regional stock car racing series sanctioned by NASCAR in Mexico. It is the sixteenth season of the series as a NASCAR-sanctioned series. It began with a race at the Autódromo de Querétaro on 9 July, and concluded with a race at the Autódromo Miguel E. Abed on 18 December.

Rubén García Jr. entered the season as defending champion, having won his 3rd title in 2019.

The 2020 season was affected by the COVID-19 pandemic, which resulted in the postponement and cancellation of several races. As a replacement, the NASCAR Mexico Series hosted virtual races on the sim racing game iRacing, on popular NASCAR tracks such as Daytona, Charlotte, Homestead and Watkins Glen.

The season eventually began in July, and featured 12 races across 9 weekends, with two doubleheader weekends hosted at the Autódromo de Querétaro, and one at the Autódromo Miguel E. Abed. The series worked closely with local health authorities to announce rescheduled races and protocols that would be followed to mitigate the spread of COVID-19. This included several races which would be held behind closed-doors, with no spectators permitted, along with some race weekends being condensed down to one-day events.

Rubén Rovelo became champion at the end of the season (1st title), beating out defending champion Rubén García Jr. by 14 points. Rovelo had a 22-point advantage heading into the final race at Autódromo Miguel E. Abed, an advantage that allowed him to mathematically clinch the championship by starting the race.

== Drivers ==
The following is a list of drivers who competed in the NASCAR Mexico Series for 2020.

No.	Driver	Rounds
1	(Mexico) Michael Dörrbecker	All
2	(Mexico) Abraham Calderón	All
6	(Mexico) Rogelio López	3, 12
08	(Mexico) José Luis Ramírez	4–5, 9, 12
11	(Mexico) Hugo Oliveras	All
20	(Mexico) Homero Richards	10
26	(Mexico) Santiago Tovar	All
28	(Mexico) Rubén Rovelo	All
31	(Mexico) Jorge Goeters	All
47	(Mexico) Xavi Razo	2–3
48	(Mexico) Salvador de Alba Jr.	All
51	(Mexico) Jake Cosío	1–7, 12
77	(Mexico) Rubén Pardo	1–10, 12
88	(Mexico) Rubén García Jr.	All

== Schedule ==
The schedule for the 2020 season was affected by the COVID-19 pandemic.

The season was scheduled to begin with a race in Querétaro on 29 March. However, on 16 March, the series' announced a postponement of all races due to the pandemic until further notice.

On 17 June, the series announced the first three rescheduled dates in coordination with local health authorities; races in Querétaro, San Luis Potosí, and Aguascalientes. All of these races would be held with no spectators permitted. In addition, the races in Querétaro and San Luis Potosí would be run as one-day events.

On 18 August, four additional races were announced; a doubleheader in Puebla, and second races in Querétaro and San Luis Potosí. The weekend at Querétaro was later expanded to a doubleheader.

On 17 September, the final races of the rescheduled calendar were announced, bringing the calendar to 12 races. The series would return to Aguascalientes for a second date, and Querétaro would receive a second doubleheader weekend, resulting in it hosting 5 races in a single season, the most from any track in series' history. The season would then conclude in Puebla, with the Autódromo Miguel E. Abed hosting the final race for the first time since 2014.

No.	Race title	Track	Location	Date
1	Gran Premio Querétaro	Autódromo de Querétaro	El Marqués, Querétaro	9 July
2	Gran Premio San Luis Potosí	Super Óvalo Potosino	San Luis Potosí City, San Luis Potosí	30 July
3	Gran Premio Aguascalientes	Óvalo Aguascalientes México	Aguascalientes City, Aguascalientes	20 August
4	Gran Premio Puebla	Autódromo Miguel E. Abed	Amozoc, Puebla	11 September
5	Gran Premio Puebla	Autódromo Miguel E. Abed	Amozoc, Puebla	12 September
6	Gran Premio Querétaro	Autódromo de Querétaro	El Marqués, Querétaro	2 October
7	Gran Premio Querétaro	Autódromo de Querétaro	El Marqués, Querétaro	3 October
8	Gran Premio San Luis Potosí	Super Óvalo Potosino	San Luis Potosí City, San Luis Potosí	22 October
9	Gran Premio OkAutopartes.com	Óvalo Aguascalientes México	Aguascalientes City, Aguascalientes	6 November
10	Gran Premio Treviño Refacciones	Autódromo de Querétaro	El Marqués, Querétaro	27 November
11	Gran Premio Treviño Refacciones	Autódromo de Querétaro	El Marqués, Querétaro	28 November
12	Gran Premio FedEx	Autódromo Miguel E. Abed	Amozoc, Puebla	18 December

Oval Track
Road course

== Results and standings ==
No.	Location	Most Laps Led	Winning driver	Manufacturer	Ref
1	Querétaro	Rubén Rovelo	Rubén Rovelo	Toyota	
2	San Luis Potosí	Rubén Rovelo	Rubén Rovelo	Toyota	
3	Aguascalientes	Rubén García Jr.	Rubén Rovelo	Toyota	
4	Puebla	Rubén García Jr.	Rubén García Jr.	Toyota	
5	Puebla	Salvador de Alba Jr.	Abraham Calderón	Ford	
6	Querétaro	Salvador de Alba Jr.	Salvador de Alba Jr.	Ford	
7	Querétaro	Salvador de Alba Jr.	Rubén Rovelo	Toyota	
8	San Luis Potosí	Salvador de Alba Jr.	Salvador de Alba Jr.	Ford	
9	Aguascalientes	Abraham Calderón	Abraham Calderón	Ford	
10	Querétaro	Rubén Rovelo	Rubén García Jr.	Toyota	
11	Querétaro	Rubén Rovelo	Rubén Rovelo	Toyota	
12	Puebla	Abraham Calderón	Abraham Calderón	Ford	

=== Final standings ===
No.	Driver	QRO	SLP	AGS	PUE	PUE	QRO	QRO	SLP	AGS	QRO	QRO	PUE	Points
1	Rubén Rovelo	1	1	1	5	3	3	1	3	3	3	1	10	522
2	Rubén García Jr.	2	3	8	1	5	2	3	2	2	1	2	2	508
3	Abraham Calderón	8	2	2	2	1	8	6	7	1	2	3	1	503
4	Salvador de Alba Jr.	7	5	5	11	2	1	2	1	10	4	8	3	487
5	Michael Dörrbecker	3	8	3	8	6	7	5	4	5	5	4	8	462
6	Jorge Goeters	5	4	4	7	4	9	10	6	7	9	7	5	452
7	Santiago Tovar	4	9	11	3	10	4	4	8	8	10	6	9	443
8	Hugo Oliveras	10	10	7	6	9	10	7	5	9	6	5	7	437
9	Rubén Pardo	6	7	10	4	8	6	9	9	6	7		4	409
10	Jake Cosío	9	5	6	10	11	5	8					6	254
11	José Luis Ramírez				9	7				4			11	145
12	Xavi Razo		6	12										70
13	Rogelio López			9									12	68
14	Homero Richards										8			37

== See also ==
- 2020 NASCAR Cup Series
- 2020 NASCAR Xfinity Series
- 2020 NASCAR Gander RV & Outdoors Truck Series
- 2020 ARCA Menards Series
- 2020 ARCA Menards Series East
- 2020 ARCA Menards Series West
- 2020 NASCAR Whelen Modified Tour
- 2020 NASCAR Pinty's FanCave Challenge
