= 2022 NASCAR Mexico Series =

15th season of the NASCAR Mexico Series

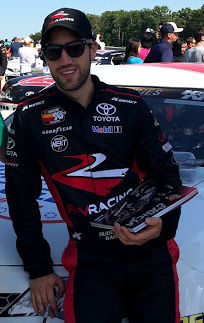
Rubén García Jr, the 2022 champion

The 2022 NASCAR Mexico Series was the fifteenth season of the NASCAR Mexico Series, a regional stock car racing series sanctioned by NASCAR in Mexico. It is the eighteenth season of the series as a NASCAR-sanctioned series. It began with the Gran Premio Nus–Kah at Súper Óvalo Chiapas on 10 April and ended with the NASCAR Puebla Gran Final at Autódromo Miguel E. Abed on 11 December.

The series reverted back to the NASCAR Mexico Series name starting this year after PEAK (and parent company Old World Industries) did not continue their title sponsorship and a replacement title sponsor was not found. The last year where the series did not have a title sponsor and had this name was 2015.

Salvador de Alba Jr. entered the season as the defending champion. Rubén García Jr. won his record-breaking fourth championship in the series in 2022.

== Schedule, results and standings ==
=== Schedule and race results ===
No.	Race title	Track	Location	Date	Winning driver
1	Gran Premio Nus–Kah Chiapas	Súper Óvalo Chiapas	Tuxtla Gutiérrez, Chiapas	10 April	Rogelio López
2	Gran Premio Nus–Kah Querétaro	Autódromo del Ecocentro de la Unión Ganadera	El Marqués, Querétaro	8 May	Rubén García Jr.
3	Gran Premio Chihuahua	El Dorado Speedway	Juan Aldama, Chihuahua	4 June	Rubén García Jr.
4	Gran Premio Guadalajara	Trióvalo Internacional de Cajititlán	Tlajomulco de Zúñiga, Jalisco	26 June	Xavi Razo
5	Gran Premio Red Cola	Autódromo Miguel E. Abed	Puebla, Puebla	17 July	Xavi Razo
6	Gran Premio Nus–Kah San Luis Potosí	Super Óvalo Potosino	San Luis Potosí City, San Luis Potosí	7 August	Rubén García Jr.
7	Gran Premio Monterrey	Autódromo Monterrey	Apodaca, Nuevo León	28 August	Abraham Calderón
8	Gran Premio Monster Energy Aguascalientes	Óvalo Aguascalientes México	Aguascalientes City, Aguascalientes	25 September	Rubén García Jr.
9	Gran Premio Commscope Querétaro	Autódromo del Ecocentro de la Unión Ganadera	El Marqués, Querétaro	9 October	José Luis Ramírez
10	SpeedFest Ciudad de México	Autódromo Hermanos Rodríguez	Mexico City	6 November	Abraham Calderón
11	Gran Premio TELCEL ZTE	Autódromo Monterrey	Apodaca, Nuevo León	27 November	Salvador de Alba
12	NASCAR Puebla Gran Final	Autódromo Miguel E. Abed	Puebla, Puebla	11 December	Abraham Calderón

=== Drivers' championship ===
1. Rubén García Jr. – 232
2. Abraham Calderón – 227
3. Ruben Rovelo – 216
4. Rogelio López – 213
5. Salvador de Alba Jr. – 198
6. Enrique Baca – 181
7. Jorge Goeters – 178
8. Xavi Razo – 177
9. Max Gutiérrez – 177
10. José Luis Ramírez – 173
11. Jake Cosío – 173
12. Germán Quirogao – 165
13. Omar Jarudo – 147
14. Rubén Pardo – 145
15. Manuel Gutiérrez – 136

== See also ==
- 2022 NASCAR Cup Series
- 2022 NASCAR Xfinity Series
- 2022 NASCAR Camping World Truck Series
- 2022 ARCA Menards Series
- 2022 ARCA Menards Series East
- 2022 ARCA Menards Series West
- 2022 NASCAR Whelen Modified Tour
- 2022 NASCAR Pinty's Series
- 2022 NASCAR Whelen Euro Series
- 2022 SRX Series
- 2022 CARS Tour
- 2022 SMART Modified Tour
