= 2002 MasterCard Truck Series =

Seasons
- ← none 2003 →

The MasterCard Truck Series was the first season of the MasterCard Truck Series. After eight races Jorge Goeters was proclaimed champion.

== Results ==
Round	Date	Race	Venue	Winner	Manufacturer
1	July 14	(Mexico) Guadalajara	Trióvalo Bernardo Obregón	César Pedrero	(United States) Chevrolet
2	July 28	(Mexico) Monterrey	Autódromo Monterrey	Jorge Goeters	(United States) Chevrolet
3	August 18	(Mexico) Saltillo	Autódromo del Norte	Sebastián Ocaranza	(United States) Chevrolet
4	September 1	(Mexico) Guadalajara	Trióvalo Bernardo Obregón	Jorge Goeters	(United States) Chevrolet
5	October 9	(Mexico) Saltillo	Autódromo del Norte	Javier de la Parra	(United States) Chevrolet
6	October 19	(United States) San Antonio	San Antonio Speedway	César T. Jiménez	(United States) Chevrolet
7	December 7	Mexico	Autódromo Hermanos Rodríguez	Gianfranco Cané	(United States) Chevrolet
8	December 8	Mexico	Autódromo Hermanos Rodríguez	César Pedrero	(United States) Chevrolet

== Standings ==
Rank	Driver	Points
1	Jorge Goeters	1283
2	Sebastián Ocaranza	1247
3	Héctor Rached	1171
4	Gianfranco Cané	1161
5	Eduardo Calderón	1126
6	Héctor Sánchez	1099
7	Sebastián Ocaranza, Jr.	1086
8	Oscar Ruiz	1083
9	Jesús Castellanos	1067
10	Rafael Jaimenson	1065
