= Rubén García Jr. (racing driver) =

Mexican auto racing driver

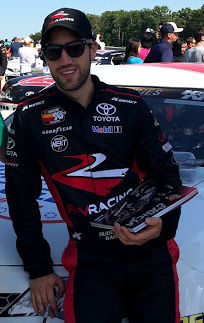
- García Jr. at New Jersey Motorsports Park in 2018
- Born: November 21, 1995 (age 30); Mexico City, Mexico
- Achievements: 2015, 2018, 2019, 2022,2024 and 2026 NASCAR Mexico Series champion 2011 NASCAR Stock V6 Series champion

NASCAR O'Reilly Auto Parts Series career
- 3 races run over 1 year
- 2014 position: 54th
- Best finish: 54th (2014)
- First race: 2014 Blue Jeans Go Green 200 (Phoenix)
- Last race: 2014 John R. Elliott HERO Campaign 300 (Kentucky)
Wins	Top tens	Poles
0	0	0

NASCAR Mexico Series career
- 124 races run over 11 years
- 2022 position: 1st
- Best finish: 1st (2015), (2018), (2019), (2022), (2024)
- First race: 2011 Aguascalientes 240 (Aguascalientes)
- Last race: 2022 Gran Premio Chihuahua (Chihuahua)
- First win: 2013 Aguascalientes 240 (Aguascalientes)
- Last win: 2022 Gran Premio Chihuahua (Chihuahua)
Wins	Top tens	Poles
29	96	15
- Statistics up to date as of April 20, 2026.

Rubén García Jr. (born November 21, 1995) is a Mexican professional stock car racing driver. He competes full-time in the NASCAR Mexico Series, driving the No. 88 for Team GP - CANEL'S.

== Racing career ==
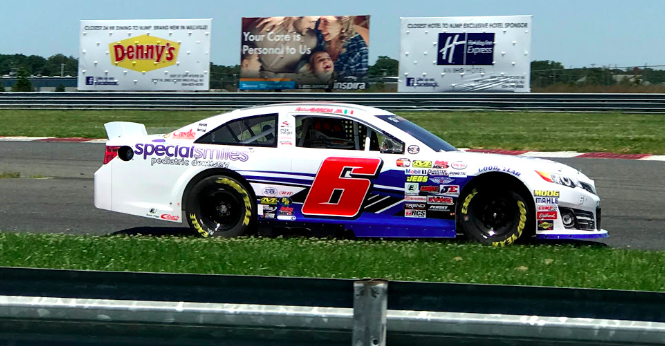
García Jr. on track in the NASCAR K&N Pro Series East in 2018

== Personal life ==
He is the son of the fellow racing driver Rubén García Novoa, and despite the same name, none of them are related to also racing driver Ruben Garcia.

== Motorsports career results ==
=== NASCAR ===
(key) (Bold – Pole position awarded by qualifying time. Italics – Pole position earned by points standings or practice time. * – Most laps led.)

==== Nationwide Series ====
NASCAR Nationwide Series results
Year	Team	No.	Make	1	2	3	4	5	6	7	8	9	10	11	12	13	14	15	16	17	18	19	20	21	22	23	24	25	26	27	28	29	30	31	32	33	NNSC	Pts	Ref
2014	SR² Motorsports	24	Toyota	DAY	PHO; 25	LVS	BRI; 33	CAL	TEX	DAR	RCH	TAL	IOW	CLT	DOV	MCH	ROA																				54th	41	
2014	Rick Ware Racing	87	Chevy															KEN; 33	DAY	NHA	CHI	IND	IOW	GLN	MOH	BRI	ATL	RCH	CHI	KEN	DOV	KAN	CLT	TEX	PHO	HOM	54th	41	

==== K&N Pro Series East ====
NASCAR K&N Pro Series East results
Year	Team	No.	Make	1	2	3	4	5	6	7	8	9	10	11	12	13	14	NKNPSEC	Pts	Ref
2016	Rev Racing	6	Toyota	NSM; 21	MOB; 18	GRE; 19	BRI; 18	VIR; 8	DOM; 6	STA; 10	COL; 16	NHA; 20		GLN; 17	GRE; 8	NJM; 6	DOV; 5	10th	425	
2016	Rev Racing	66	Toyota										IOW; 19					10th	425	
2017	Rev Racing	6	Toyota	NSM; 16	GRE; 9	BRI; 2	SBO; 6	SBO; 5	MEM; 14	BLN; 8		NHA; 7	IOW; 12	GLN; 4	LGY; 6	NJM; 10	DOV; 10	5th	501	
2017	Rev Racing	03	Toyota								TMP; 8							5th	501	
2018	Rev Racing	6	Toyota	NSM; 26	BRI; 10	LGY; 10	SBO; 12	SBO; 15	MEM; 1	NJM; 7		NHA; 12		GLN; 8		NHA; 17	DOV; 1*	3rd	489	
2018	Rev Racing	12	Toyota								THO; 9							3rd	489	
2018	Rev Racing	42	Toyota										IOW; 5		GTW; 4			3rd	489	
2019	Rev Racing	6	Toyota	NSM; 8	BRI; 17	SBO; 5	SBO; 7	MEM; 12	NHA; 14		GLN; 5	BRI; 3		NHA; 7	DOV; 8			6th	433	
2019	Rev Racing	2	Toyota							IOW; 3			GTW; 6					6th	433	

==== NASCAR Mexico Series ====
NASCAR PEAK Mexico Series results
Year	Team	No.	Make	1	2	3	4	5	6	7	8	9	10	11	12	13	14	15	NPMSC	Pts	Ref
2011	HDI Seguros Racing Team	27	Toyota	MTY	SLP	AGS	TUX	QRO	PUE	MXC	SLP	MTY	QRO	PUE	SLP	AGS; 17	MXC; 25		45th	200	
2012	SC Racing	88	Toyota	MTY; 8	SLP; 27	QRO; 7	MXC; 11	**PUE**; 6	AGS; 7	MXC; 17	SLP; 24	QRO; 10	AGS; 26	PUE; 17	MTY; 24	CHI; 10	MXC; 3		14th	416	
2013	Team GP	88	Mazda	PHO; 3	SLP; 7	MXC; 9	QRO; 6	CHI; 18	**AGS**; 1*	PUE; 25	MTY; 8	QRO; 7	MXC; 11	SLP; 6	PUE; 8	AGS; 19	TUX; 10	MXC; 5	4th	1176	
2014	HDI Seguros	88	Toyota	PHO; 7	MXC; 11	TUX; 10	MTY; 9	SLP; 26	QRO; 27	MXC; 6	AGS; 19	QRO; 8	PUE; 5	CHI; 9	**SLP**; 9	AGS; 3*	TUX; 2*	PUE; 12	2nd	1191	
2015	Canel's Racing	88	Toyota	PHO; 10	SLP; 4	**TUX**; 5	QRO; 8	PUE; 21	**AGS**; 11	CHI; 1*	**SLP**; 5	PUE; 15	SLP; 8	CHI; 1*	**AGS**; 4	MXC; 1	MXC; 10	TUX; 5	1st	1213	
2017	Alpha Racing	88	Toyota	**MTY**; 7	SLP; 21	PUE; 15	GDL; 23	LEO; 9	AGS; 2	PAC; 16	**QRO**; 4	GDL; 4	TUX; 4	PUE; 3	MXC; 12				3rd	411	
2018	Canel's Racing	88	Toyota	MTY; 7	SLP; 8	**CHI**; 7*	GDL; 3	PUE; 1	**AGS**; 1*	QRO; 1	PUE; 9	**TUX**; 7	AGS; 2	GDL; 2	MXC; 8				1st	488	
2019	Canel's Racing	88	Toyota	MTY; 1	TUX; 2	GDL; 4	AGS; 1	PUE; 1	CHI; 7	QRO; 4	SLP; 3	**GDL**; 1	PUE; 5	AGS; 17	MXC; 6				1st*	496	
2020	Canel's Racing	88	Toyota	QRO; 2	SLP; 3	**AGS**; 8*	PUE; 1*	PUE; 5	QRO; 2	QRO; 3	SLP; 2	AGS; 2	QRO; 1	QRO; 2	PUE; 2				2nd	508	
2021	Canel's Racing	88	Chevy	TUX; 3	QRO; 2	PUE; 2	AGS; 1*	**SLP**; 4	QRO; 2	MTY; 5	AGS; 1*	SLP; 4	GDL; 10	**PUE**; 2	PUE; 2				2nd	477	
2022	Canel's Racing	88	Chevy	TUX; 13	QRO; 1	CHI; 1	GDL	PUE	SLP	MTY	AGS	QRO	TBA	GDL	PUE				1st	232	
2023	Canel's Racing	88	Chevy																2nd		
2024	Canel's Racing	88	Chevy																1st		
