= Alex de Alba =

Mexican racing driver (born 1997)

- Born: 14 March 1997 (age 29); San Luis Potosí, San Luis Potosí, Mexico
- Achievements: 2017 NASCAR Mikel's Truck Series Champion; 2023 NASCAR FedEx Challenge Champion; 2025 Mexico Series Champion
- Awards: 2019 NASCAR FedEx Challenge Rookie of the Year; 2024 NASCAR Mexico Series Rookie of the Year

NASCAR Mexico Series career
- 40 races run over 4 years
- Best finish: 1st (2025)

Alejandro de Alba Márquez (born 14 March 1997) is a Mexican racing driver. He competes full-time in the NASCAR Mexico Series, driving the No. 14 for Sidral Aga Racing. He won the NASCAR Mikel's Truck Series in 2017, NASCAR FedEx Challenge in 2019 and the NASCAR Mexico Series in 2025.

== Career ==
In 2017, de Alba ran in the NASCAR Mikel's Truck Series in Mexico, where he won the championship at the age of 20. The following year, he finished runner-up in the series. Also that year, de Alba began to compete in NASCAR FedEx Challenge Series. He finished fourth in the points in 2019 and was Rookie of the Year that season. He went on to finish third in the standings 2020, and second in 2021 and 2022. He won the Challenge Series in 2023.

In 2024, de Alba moved to the NASCAR Mexico Series, driving the No. 14 Chevrolet. In his first full season in the series, he qualified for the playoffs and won his first race at the Red Tail Grand Prize at Puebla. He also won Rookie of the Year honors.

In the 2025 season, de Alba switched to a Ford Mustang. He won his first race of the season at Chiapas Extraordinary By Nature 200. He then won another race, at the Querétaro 200, en route to the regular season title. At Puebla 110, the season finale, he finished in fourth place and won the series championship.
