= 2021 NASCAR PEAK Mexico Series =

14th season of the NASCAR PEAK Mexico Series

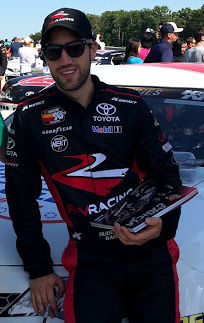
Rubén García Jr., the 2015, 2018 and 2019 series champion, finished second behind de Alba Jr. in the championship by just 6 points.

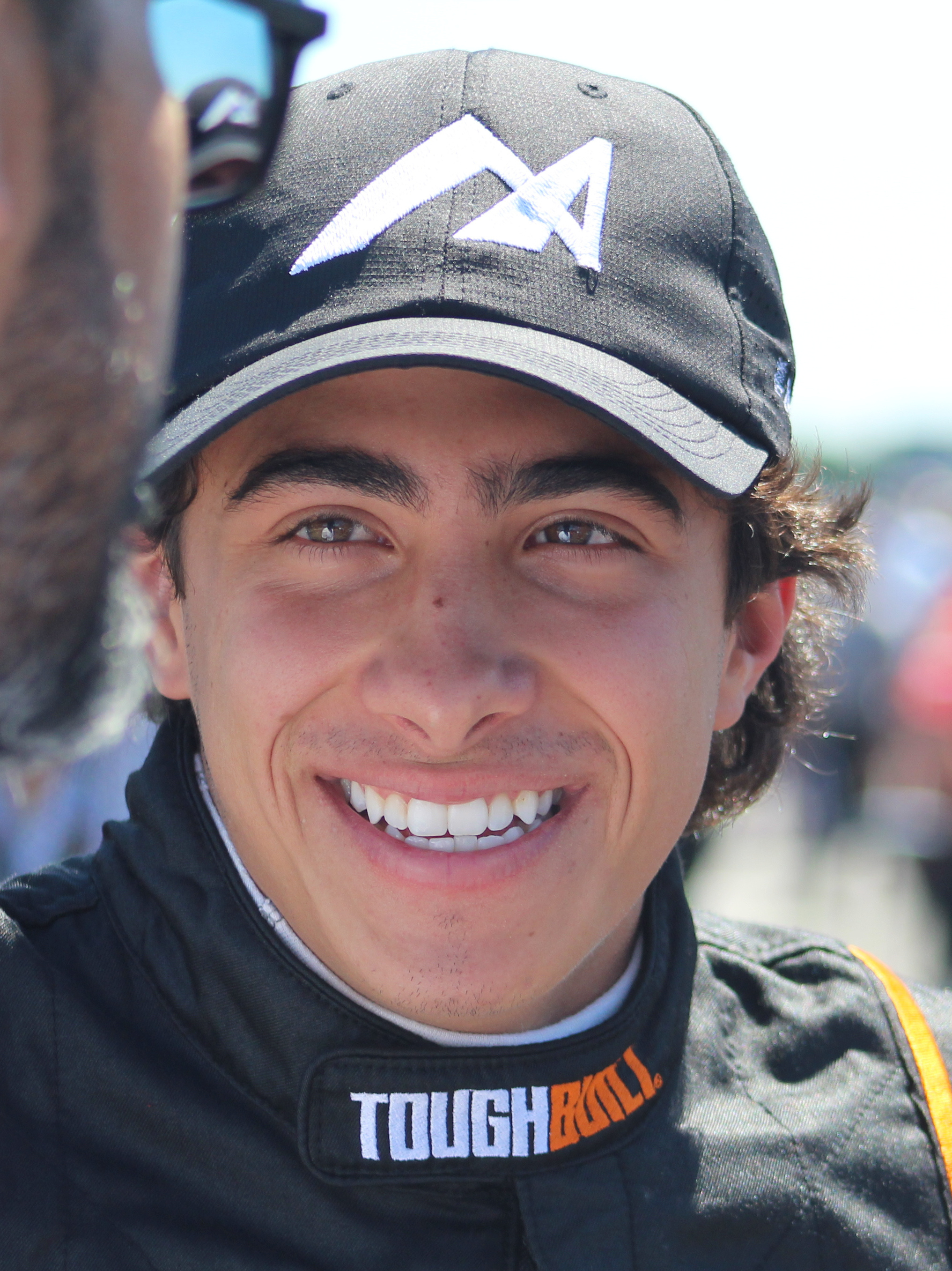
Max Gutierrez, finished fourth in points and won rookie of the year honors.

The 2021 NASCAR PEAK Mexico Series was the fourteenth season of the NASCAR PEAK Mexico Series, a regional stock car racing series sanctioned by NASCAR in Mexico. It was the seventeenth season of the series as a NASCAR-sanctioned series. It began with the race at Súper Óvalo Chiapas on 23 May and ended with the race at Autódromo Miguel E. Abed on 5 December.

Salvador de Alba Jr. won his first championship in the series, prevailing in a tight points battle he and three-time series champion Rubén García Jr. had during the season. Both of them as well as two-time series champion Abraham Calderón, defending series champion Rubén Rovelo, and José Luis Ramírez won races in 2021.

This was the last year that PEAK (and parent company Old World Industries) was the title sponsor of the series. In 2022, the name of the series changed to the NASCAR Mexico Series after a replacement title sponsor was not found.

== Schedule, results and standings ==
=== Schedule and race results ===
No.	Track	Location	Date	Winning driver
1	Súper Óvalo Chiapas	Tuxtla Gutiérrez, Chiapas	23 May	Salvador de Alba Jr.
2	Autódromo del Ecocentro de la Unión Ganadera	El Marqués, Querétaro	20 June	Rubén Rovelo
3	Autódromo Miguel E. Abed	Puebla, Puebla	11 July	Salvador de Alba Jr.
4	Óvalo Aguascalientes México	Aguascalientes City, Aguascalientes	1 August	Rubén García Jr.
5	Super Óvalo Potosino	San Luis Potosí City, San Luis Potosí	22 August	Abraham Calderón
6	Autódromo del Ecocentro de la Unión Ganadera	El Marqués, Querétaro	5 September	Salvador de Alba Jr.
7	Autódromo Monterrey	Apodaca, Nuevo León	26 September	Rubén Rovelo
8	Óvalo Aguascalientes México	Aguascalientes City, Aguascalientes	10 October	Rubén García Jr.
9	Super Óvalo Potosino	San Luis Potosí City, San Luis Potosí	24 October	Rubén Rovelo
10	Trióvalo Internacional de Cajititlán	Tlajomulco de Zúñiga, Jalisco	14 November	Abraham Calderón
11	Autódromo Miguel E. Abed	Puebla, Puebla	4 December	Salvador de Alba Jr.
12	Autódromo Miguel E. Abed	Puebla, Puebla	5 December	José Luis Ramírez

=== Drivers' championship ===
1. Salvador de Alba Jr. – 483
2. Rubén García Jr. – 477
3. Abraham Calderón – 428
4. Max Gutiérrez – 405
5. Rubén Rovelo – 379
6. Rogelio López – 338
7. Omar Jurado – 328
8. Jake Cosío – 318
9. Rubén Pardo – 316
10. Germán Quiroga – 313
11. Jorge Goeters – 312
12. Santiago Tovar – 298
13. Manuel Gutiérrez – 292
14. José Luis Ramírez – 291
15. Xavi Razo – 236
16. Juan Manuel González – 141
17. Michel Jourdain Jr. – 56
18. Hugo Oliveras – 52
19. Enrique Baca – 51

== See also ==
- 2021 NASCAR Cup Series
- 2021 NASCAR Xfinity Series
- 2021 NASCAR Camping World Truck Series
- 2021 ARCA Menards Series
- 2021 ARCA Menards Series East
- 2021 ARCA Menards Series West
- 2021 NASCAR Whelen Modified Tour
- 2021 NASCAR Pinty's Series
- 2021 NASCAR Whelen Euro Series
- 2021 eNASCAR iRacing Pro Invitational Series
- 2021 SRX Series
