= UNOH Battle at the Beach =

NASCAR race

K&N Pro Series
- Venue: Daytona International Speedway
- Location: Daytona Beach, Florida
- Corporate sponsor: University of Northwestern Ohio
- First race: 2013
- Last race: 2014
- Distance: 60 mi (97 km)
- Laps: 150

Circuit information
- Surface: Asphalt
- Length: .400 mi (0.644 km)
- Turns: 4

UNOH Battle at the Beach
Whelen Modified Tour
- First race: 2013
- Last race: 2014
- Distance: 60 mi (97 km)
- Laps: 150

Circuit information
- Length: .400 mi (0.644 km)

UNOH Battle at the Beach
Whelen All-American Series
- First race: 2013
- Last race: 2013
- Distance: 60 mi (97 km)
- Laps: 150

Circuit information
- Length: .400 mi (0.644 km)

The University of Northwestern Ohio Battle at the Beach was a nonpoints, all-star race that brought together the top drivers in NASCAR's lower-level series and club racing. A successor to the Toyota All-Star Showdown, held from 2003 to 2011 at Irwindale Speedway in California, the inaugural event was held at a newly built short track that was located on the backstretch of Daytona International Speedway on February 18–19, 2013.

== History ==
NASCAR announced on February 17, 2012, that its annual all-star event for its regional touring series, formerly held at Irwindale Speedway as the Toyota All-Star Showdown from 2003 to 2011, would return for 2013 at Daytona International Speedway, using a new temporary .400-mile oval utilising Turn 8 of the motorcycle course, the skid pad off Turn 2, and the backstretch for February 18–19, 2013, the Monday and Tuesday of Speedweeks after Daytona 500 qualifying. The race also adopted a new name with a new sponsor and venue, the University of Northwestern Ohio Battle at the Beach.

The K&N Pro Series East and West cars would return with their own race, along with Late Models (although it will feature only one class, based on NASCAR-established rules used at NASCAR-sanctioned tracks), and new for 2013, the Whelen Modified Tours (North and South tours will participate in one combined race.

The Battle at the Beach was canceled for 2015 due to the Daytona Rising renovation project; the name was reused when UNOH announced its sponsorship of the Myrtle Beach 400 late model stock car race at Myrtle Beach Speedway.

== Format ==
The formats were similar for the two NASCAR touring races in the Toyota All-Star Showdown, with automatic lock-in slots for winning races and the championship during the 2012 season. All race winners and series champions in each touring division qualified for their respective division's race. For the K&N Pro Series, all East and West Series race winners qualified for the feature, along with the respective series champion. For the Modified division, all Whelen Modified and Whelen Southern Modified Tour race winners qualified for the feature, along with the respective series champions.

The Late Model race automatically qualified the national champion in the NASCAR Whelen All-American Series and the other nine drivers in NASCAR's top ten in the Whelen All-American Series standings.

Series champions in NASCAR's three international series (Canada, Mexico, Europe) had the option of racing in any of the three races. They could choose which of the three races to participate and would automatically qualify.

Time trials and heat races determined the balance of the starting field for the two races.

== Winners ==
Year	K&N Pro Series	Whelen Modified Tours	Whelen All-American Series
2013	Cameron Hayley	Steve Park	Kyle Larson
2014	Daniel Suárez	Doug Coby	Not held
