= NASCAR Mexico Series =

Mexican auto racing series

- Category: Stock Cars
- Country: Mexico; United States
- Inaugural season: 2004
- Manufacturers: Chevrolet; Ford; Toyota (formerly); Mazda (formerly); Dodge (formerly)
- Tire suppliers: American Racer
- Drivers' champion: Alejandro de alba
- Makes' champion: Ford
- Teams' champion: Aga Racing Team
- Official website: www.nascar.mx/

The NASCAR Mexico Series (formerly NASCAR Corona Series and other names) is a national NASCAR-sanctioned racing series in Mexico. It is the most prestigious stock car racing series in the country.

== Origins (Desafío Corona) ==
The Desafío Corona was established in 2004 by NASCAR Mexico, a joint-venture between NASCAR and Mexican entertainment group OCESA, with the idea of developing stock car racing in Mexico, and fueling a transition from the country's historically open-wheel car racing fan base to stock car racing.

From 2004 to 2006, the Desafío Corona grew considerably in infrastructure, as well as in number of fans, drivers and sponsors.

== Present ==
NASCAR Corona Series logo, 2007–2010

NASCAR Corona Series logo, 2011

NASCAR Toyota Series logo, 2012–2014

NASCAR PEAK Mexico Series logo, 2018–2022

The NASCAR Mexico Corona Series was officially presented at the 2006 Desafío Corona award ceremony. Toyota assumed naming rights in 2012, dubbing it the NASCAR Toyota Series.

The series is one of NASCAR's four international series alongside the NASCAR Canada Series, NASCAR Brasil Series, and the NASCAR Euro Series.

The winner of the series championship received an invitation to the UNOH Battle at the Beach (formerly the Toyota All-Star Showdown). All other drivers could also attempt to qualify by entering the heat races.

== 2016 hiatus ==
After the end of the 2015 season, the series was suspended supposedly due to the fact that organizers of the series wanted to instead support the Formula One Mexican Grand Prix, which had just been revived for 2015. Several of the teams and drivers that participated in the series moved to the Super Copa Telcel "V8" series.

== 2017 return ==
In October 2016, it was announced that the series would return with new sponsorship from PEAK Antifreeze, with an exhibition race that December to be followed by a full 2017 season.

Two new supporting series were also created for 2017: the NASCAR FedEx Challenge Series and NASCAR Mikel's Truck Series.

The series lost its sponsorship with PEAK Antifreeze in 2022, with the series name reverting back to the NASCAR Mexico Series.

The following year saw the implementation of a playoff system for the first time to decide the end-of-season champion.

== Mexico Series tracks ==
The NASCAR Mexico Series has held events on 17 tracks in 15 locations (two in Santiago de Querétaro and two in San Luis Potosí) since its inception in 2004. The series has raced on a mix of ovals and road courses that are mainly located in Mexico, though some events have also taken place in the United States and Panama.

Several tracks have been raced on in both a road course and oval configuration, including Autódromo Monterrey, Autódromo Hermanos Rodríguez, Autódromo Miguel E. Abed, and Autódromo de Quéretaro.

The Los Angeles Memorial Coliseum in Los Angeles, USA has historically had the shortest lap distance of any track, being just 0.402 km (0.250 mi) long. Currently, the Super Óvalo Potosino is the shortest track with a distance of 0.804 km (0.500 mi). The longest track is set to be Autódromo Hermanos Rodríguez's National road course layout, which will be used for the Mexico Series' joint weekend with the NASCAR Cup and Xfinity Series in June 2025, with a distance of 3.89 km (2.42 mi). Previously, the longest track was Autódromo Monterrey's road course layout, with a distance of 3.2 km (2.0 mi).

San Luis Potosí is the location with the most races in series' history, with 42 races having been held as of April 2025 (40 at Super Óvalo Potosino and 2 at Autódromo San Luis 400).

NASCAR Mexico has powered the construction of oval tracks in México, with examples including a remodeling of Autódromo Potosino in 2005, Aguascalientes, Chiapas, and Querétaro. In 2012, another speedway was completed in Juan Aldama, Chihuahua, which is currently known as El Dorado Speedway. El Dorado Speedway has uniquely hosted one of the only night races on the calendar for several years.

In 2013, the series held its first international event; a 75-lap, 75-mile (122 km) long race held at Phoenix Raceway in the southwestern United States. The race was held as part of the NASCAR Cup Series' Subway Fresh Fit 500 weekend, and was known as the Toyota 120. The race lasted until the 2015 season.

In 2024, the series held an exhibition race as part of the NASCAR Cup Series' Busch Light Clash at the Coliseum weekend, that was conducted at a temporary 0.402 km (0.250 mi) circuit around the Los Angeles Memorial Coliseum. The Mexico Series race was a support race for the Clash, and the race was won by Daniel Suárez.

In 2025, the series planned to stage its first race in Central America, which would be held at the Autódromo Panamá located near Sajalices, roughly 50 km southwest of Panama City. The event would be known as the Nations Panama City 200. However, that round was cancelled in August and replaced with another round.

Nascar Mexico venues in green. In red are former venues.

Venue	Tracks	Years
Mexico City	Autódromo Hermanos Rodríguez	2004–2019, 2022–present
(Nuevo León) Monterrey	Autódromo Monterrey	2004–2014, 2017–2019, 2021–present
San Luis Potosí	Super Óvalo Potosino	2005–2015, 2017–present
Puebla	Autódromo Miguel E. Abed	2006–2015, 2017–present
Querétaro	EcoCentro Expositor Querétaro	2008–2015, 2017–present
(Chiapas) Tuxtla Gutiérrez	Autódromo Chiapas	2008–2011, 2013–2015, 2017–2019, 2021–present
Aguascalientes	Óvalo Aguascalientes México	2009–2015, 2017–present
(Quintana Roo) Tulum	Tulum International Airport	2026
(Yucatán) Progreso	Autódromo Yucatán	2026

=== Former tracks ===
City	Track	Years
(Jalisco) Guadalajara	Trióvalo Internacional de Cajititlán	2004–2010, 2017–2022
Querétaro	Autódromo de Quéretaro	2004–2007
(Coahuila) Torreón	Autódromo Dinamita	2004
San Luis Potosí	Autódromo San Luis 400	2004
Zacatecas	Autódromo de Zacatecas	2004–2009
(Guanajuato) León	Autódromo de León	2004, 2017
(Chihuahua (state)) Juan Aldama	El Dorado Speedway	2012–2015, 2018–2019, 2022–2024
(Arizona) Phoenix	Phoenix Raceway	2013–2015
(Hidalgo (state)) Pachuca	Autódromo Moisés Solana	2017
(California) Los Angeles	Los Angeles Memorial Coliseum	2024

== Cars ==
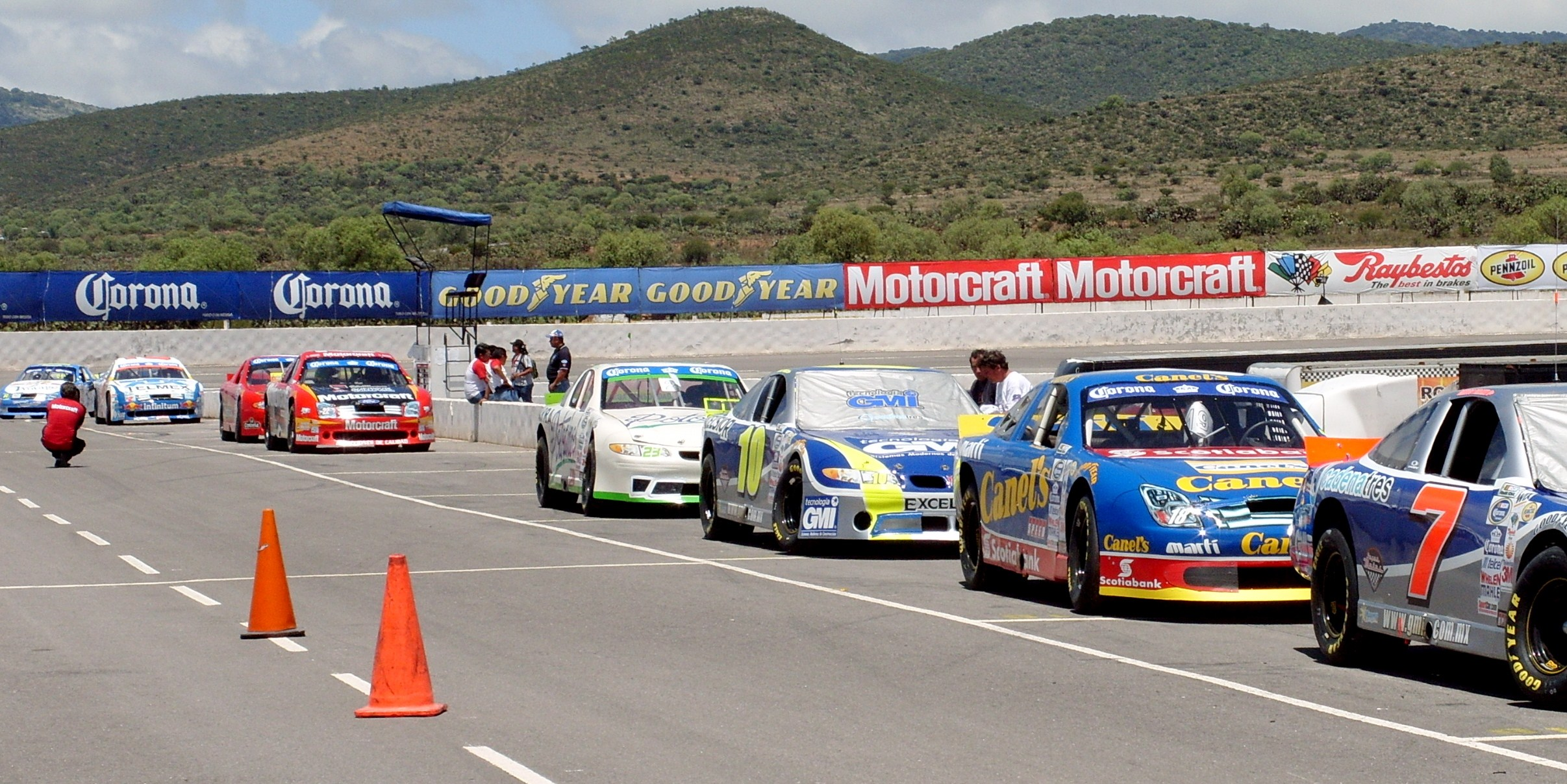
Corona Series cars

In the first season, only General Motors (through its Pontiac division) and Dodge participated in the series. Ford made its debut in 2005 with its Mustang model, but since 2006, the Fusion is the Ford model entry. In 2009, Toyota started its participation with its Camry. The Mazda 6 was first entered in 2010. As with the other NASCAR divisions in the United States, Dodge subsequently pulled its factory support and no longer participates in the Mexican series.

Along with NASCAR's other international series and the ARCA Menards Series, the Mexico Series has General Tire as an exclusive tire supplier.

=== Most wins ===
Rank	Manufacturer	Wins	Races	% Wins
1	(Japan) Toyota	83	148	56.1%
2	(United States) Ford	48	218	22.0%
3	(United States) General Motors	41	220	18.6%
4	(United States) Dodge	22	208	10.6%
5	(Japan) Mazda	14	71	19.7%

=== Specifications ===
The start of the NASCAR Mexico race at the 2024 Busch Light Clash at The Coliseum.

- Chassis: Steel tube frame with safety roll cage, must be NASCAR standards.
- Engine Displacement: 5.7 L (5,700 cc) (350 in³) V8.
- Transmission: 4 Speed Manual.
- Weight: 2,680 lb (1,216 kg) Minimum (without driver).
- Power Output: 400 hp.
- Torque: 394 ft⋅lbf (534 N⋅m).
- Fuel: 98 octane unleaded gasoline provided by Pemex.
- Fuel capacity: 15 US gal (57 L).
- Fuel delivery: Carburetion.
- Compression ratio: 9.3:1.
- Aspiration: Naturally aspirated.
- Wheelbase: 107 in (2,718 mm).
- Tires: Slick tires provided by General Tire.
- Length: 205.25 in (5,213 mm).
- Width: 74 in (1,880 mm).
- Height: 52 in (1,321 mm).
- Safety equipment: HANS device, Seat belt.

== Champions ==
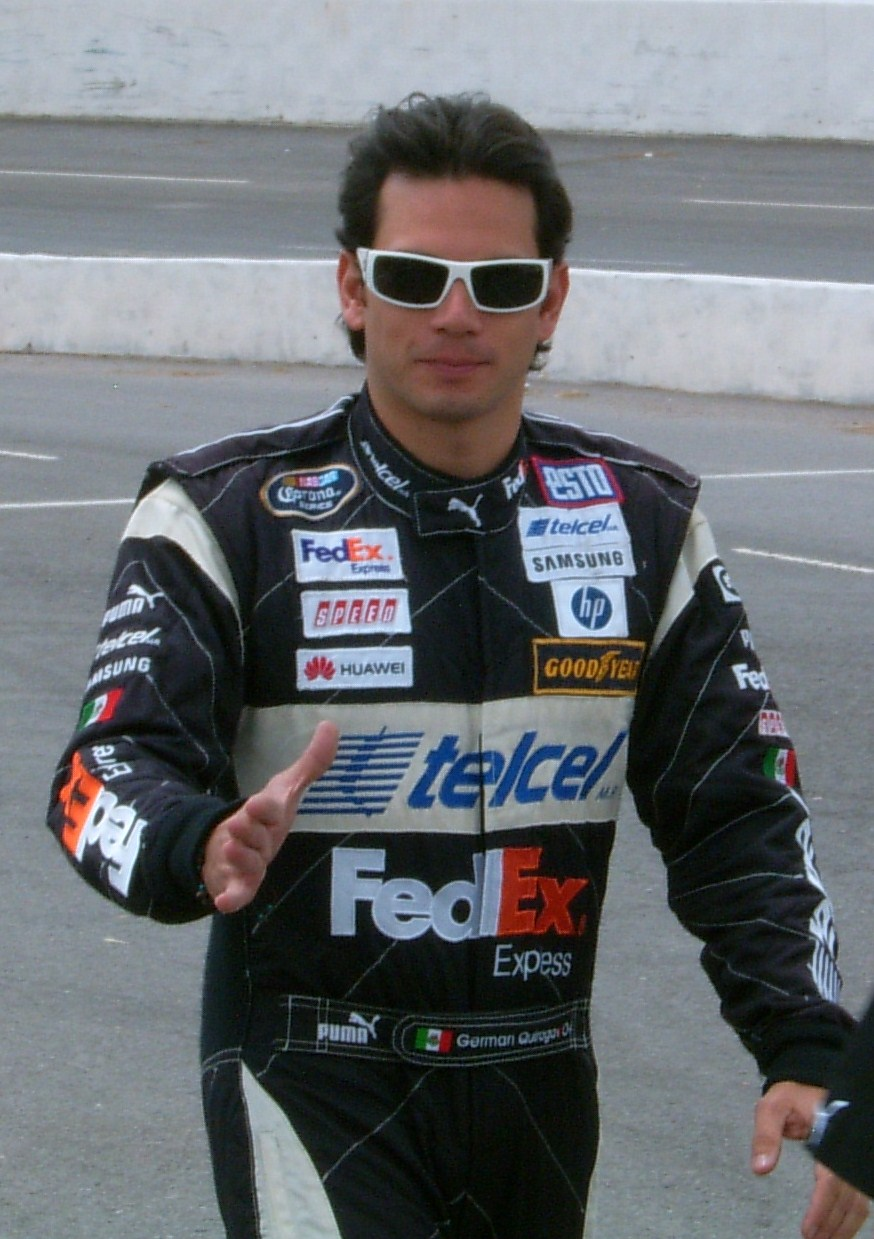
Germán Quiroga, three-time champion (2009–11)

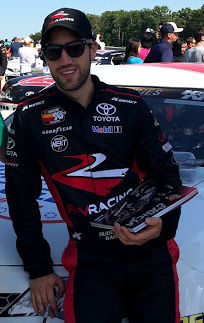
Rubén García Jr., five-time champion (2015, 2018-19, 2022, 2024)

As of 2025, eleven different drivers have won the NASCAR Mexico championship. Rubén García Jr. was the youngest champion (20 years old), and Rafael Martínez was the oldest champion (45 years old). Rubén García Jr. has the most championships to his name with 5.

Season	Driver	Team or Owner(s)	No.	Manufacturer	Starts	Wins	Top 10s	Poles	Points (margin)
2004	Carlos Pardo	Telcel Sun Motorola	6	Pontiac	14	4	12	2	2326 (69)
2005	Jorge Goeters	Ramiro Fidalgo	18	Pontiac / Dodge	14	4		4	2320 (48)
2006	Rogelio López	Carlos Slim	48	Pontiac / Dodge	14	5		7	2204 (75)
2007	Rafael Martínez	Ramiro Fidalgo	18	Ford Fusion	14	7	12	3	2250 (4)
2008	Antonio Pérez	Jimmy Morales	1	Dodge	14	5	12	2	2182 (29)
2009	Germán Quiroga	Mónica Morales	2	Ford	14	3	12	4	2273 (276)
2010	Germán Quiroga	Mónica Morales	2	Dodge	14	3	11	2	2173 (150)
2011	Germán Quiroga	Mónica Morales	2	Dodge	14	3	12	2	2272 (286)
2012	Jorge Goeters	Ramiro Fidalgo	31	Mazda	14	2	12	0	539 (34)
2013	Rodrigo Peralta	Denisse Guaida	24	Ford	14	1	11	0	1198 (8)
2014	Abraham Calderón	Monica Morales	2	Dodge/Toyota	15	0	11	1	1200 (9)
2015	Rubén García, Jr.	Juan Pablo García	88	Toyota	15	3	12	3	1213 (18)
2017	Abraham Calderón	Jimmy Morales	2	Toyota	12	5	9	1	468 (27)
2018	Rubén García, Jr.	Juan Pablo García	88	Toyota	12	3	12	2	452 (23)
2019	Rubén García, Jr.	Juan Pablo García	88	Toyota	12	4	11	2	496 (21)
2020	Rubén Rovelo	Alessandros Racing	28	Ford	12	5	11	0	522 (14)
2021	Salvador de Alba	Sidral Aga Racing team	48	Ford	12	4	10	2	483 (6)
2022	Rubén García, Jr.	Team GP - Canel's	88	Chevrolet	12	4	10		478 (9)
2023	Salvador de Alba	Sidral Aga Racing	48	Ford	12	4	10	1	Playoffs Final Four
2024	Rubén García, Jr.	Team GP - Canel's	88	Chevrolet	13	3	12	6	Playoffs Final Four
2025	Alejandro de Alba Jr	Sidral Aga Racing	48	Ford	14	3	13	4	Playoffs Final Four
2026	Rubén García, Jr.	Team GP - Canel's	88	Chevrolet	12	2	11	1	

=== Rookie of the Year ===
Season	Driver	Car	Team or Owner
2004	(Mexico) Ignacio Alvarado	Pontiac	Alvarado Racing
2005	(Mexico) Patricio Jourdain	Ford	Motorcraft Racing
2006	(Mexico) Antonio Pérez	Pontiac	Escudería Telmex
2007	(Mexico) Mike Sánchez	Chevrolet	MAG Paper
2008	(Mexico) Irwin Vences	Ford	FCV Racing
2009	(Mexico) Alejandro Capín	Chevrolet	MT Sport Marketing
2010	(Mexico) Daniel Suárez	Dodge	SC Racing/Equipo Telcel
2011	(Mexico) Enrique Contreras III	Dodge	Fénix Racing Team
2012	(Mexico) Rubén García, Jr.	Toyota	SC Racing
2013	(Mexico) Santiago Tovar	Toyota; Chevrolet	
2014	(Mexico) Rodrigo Marban	Toyota	Patricia Marban
2015	(Mexico) Manolin Gutierrez	Ford	H&H HighSpeed
2017	(Mexico) Enrique Baca	Chevrolet; Toyota	Jimmy Morales
2018	(Mexico) Fabián Welter	Toyota	Jimmy Morales
2019	(Mexico) Jacobo Cosio	Dodge	Samantha Valadez
2020	(Mexico) Luis Michael Dorrbecker	Ford	Jimmy Morales
2021	(Mexico) Max Gutiérrez	Chevrolet	Jimmy Morales
2022	Rewarded to a Challenge Series driver; no rookies in the main category		
2023	(Mexico) Andrés Pérez de Lara	Chevrolet	Jimmy Morales
2024	(Mexico) Alex de Alba	Ford	Sidral Aga Racing team
2025	(Mexico) Eloy Sebastián López	Ford	Jimmy Morales
2026	(United States) Helio Meza		

== Series winners ==
=== List of winners ===
Info accurate as of the 2026 Puebla 2 Race

Key
	Driver is currently racing in the 2026 season
**Bold**	NASCAR Mexico Champion

Rank	Driver	Wins	First	Last
1	(Mexico City) **Rubén García Jr.**	29	2013 Aguascalientes 1	2026 Chiapas
1	(Mexico City) **Rubén Rovelo**	29	2008 Guadalajara 1	2026 Mérida 1
3	(Aguascalientes) **Rogelio López**	26	2004 Guadalajara 2	2022 Chiapas
4	(Nuevo León) **Rafael Martínez**	19	2005 Guadalajara 2	2013 Querétaro 2
4	(Mexico City) **Germán Quiroga**	19	2004 San Luis Potosí 1	2025 Aguascalientes 2
6	(Nuevo León) **Abraham Calderón**	18	2013 Phoenix	2025 México City 2
7	(Mexico City) Homero Richards	15	2009 Guadalajara	2018 Monterrey
8	(Jalisco) **Salvador de Alba**	14	2018 Guadalajara 2	2023 Puebla 1
9	(Mexico City) **Jorge Goeters**	13	2004 México City 1	2012 Monterrey 2
10	(Jalisco) **Antonio Pérez**	12	2007 Monterrey 2	2013 San Luis Potosí 2
10	(Mexico City) Irwin Vences	12	2013 México City 2	2024 Querétaro 1
10	(Mexico City) Xavi Razo	12	2017 México City	2026 Mérida 2
13	(Nuevo León) Daniel Suárez	11	2012 México City 1	2024 Los Angeles
14	(Mexico City) **Carlos Pardo**	10	2004 Torreón	2009 Puebla 1
15	(Mexico City) Rubén Pardo	7	2004 Querétaro 2	2015 Phoenix
16	(Mexico City) Julio Rejón	6	2023 Aguascalientes 2	2026 México City
17	(Mexico City) Patrick Goeters	5	2005 México City 1	2013 Puebla 2
17	(Mexico City) José Luis Ramírez	5	2010 Chiapas 2	2022 Querétaro 2
17	(Mexico City) **Alejandro de Alba**	5	2024 Puebla 2	2026 Aguascalientes 1
20	(Mexico City) Max Gutierrez	4	2023 Chihuahua 2	2026 San Luis Potosí 2
21	(Mexico City) Carlos Contreras	2	2004 Guadalajara 1	2004 Querétaro 1
21	(Mexico City) Freddy Tame Jr.	2	2006 Puebla 3	2007 Querétaro 1
21	(Mexico City) Hugo Oliveras	2	2009 Querétaro 1	2012 México City 2
21	(Mexico City) **Rodrigo Peralta**	2	2013 Aguascalientes 2	2015 Querétaro 1
21	(Mexico City) Eloy Sebastián	2	2026 Tulum	2026 Aguascalientes 2
21	(Mexico City) Santiago Tovar	2	2015 Aguascalientes 1	2019 Chiapas
27	(Mexico City) Andrés Pérez de Lara	1	2024 Aguascalientes 1	2024 Aguascalientes 1
27	(Mexico City) Jake Cosio	1	2023 Querétaro 1	2023 Querétaro 1
27	(Nuevo León) César Tiberio Jiménez	1	2004 Monterrey	2004 Monterrey
27	(Jalisco) Fernando Plata	1	2006 San Luis Potosí 1	2006 San Luis Potosí 1
27	(Mexico City) Ricardo Pérez de Lara	1	2008 Zacatecas	2008 Zacatecas
27	(Argentina) Waldemar Coronas	1	2008 Querétaro 2	2008 Querétaro 2
27	(Nuevo León) Héctor Aguirre	1	2013 Mexico City 1	2013 Mexico City 1
27	(Mexico City) Luis Felipe Montaño	1	2014 México City 1	2014 México City 1
27	(Jalisco) Pepe González	1	2015 México City 2	2015 México City 2
27	(Mexico City) Michel Jourdain Jr.	1	2017 León	2017 León
27	(United States) Helio Meza	1	2026 Puebla 1	2026 Puebla 1
27	(Mexico City) Rodrigo Rejón	1	2026 Puebla 2	2026 Puebla 2

== University of Northwestern Ohio Battle at the Beach ==
Mexico Series champions were invited to the University of Northwestern Ohio Battle at the Beach (formerly known as the Toyota All-Star Showdown). In 2011, Daniel Suárez, Germán Quiroga and Rubén Rovelo took part. They finished in 11th, 12th and 30th, respectively.

Year	Race	Venue	Driver	Start	Finish
2007	Toyota All-Star Showdown	Irwindale	(Mexico City) Rubén Pardo	29	21
2008	Toyota All-Star Showdown	Irwindale	(Aguascalientes) Rogelio López	16	13
2008	Toyota All-Star Showdown	Irwindale	(Jalisco) Antonio Pérez	40	31
2009	Toyota All-Star Showdown	Irwindale	(Jalisco) Antonio Pérez	8	18
2010	Last Chance	Irwindale	(Mexico City) Rubén Rovelo	1	9
2011	Toyota All-Star Showdown	Irwindale	(Nuevo León) Daniel Suárez	12	11
2011	Toyota All-Star Showdown	Irwindale	(Mexico City) German Quiroga	25	12
2011	Toyota All-Star Showdown	Irwindale	(Mexico City) Rubén Rovelo	19	30
2013	UNOH Battle At The Beach	Daytona	(Mexico City) Jorge Goeters	26	13

== Female drivers ==
To date, four women have started a NASCAR Mexico Series race, three started a Trucks Mexico Series race and one started a NASCAR Challenge race.

Some notable accomplishments by female drivers have included Mara Reyes scoring a pole position in her first race, and Regina Sirvent becoming the first woman to win a NASCAR Trucks Mexico Series race.

Driver	Season	Entries	Starts	Wins	Top 10
(Mexico) Mara Reyes	2004–2005	28	28	0	20
(Mexico) Leslie González	2005	1	1	0	0
(Mexico) Estefania Reyes	2007, 2010–2011	21	17	0	0
(Mexico) Regina Sirvent*	2022-	?	?	2**	?
(Mexico) Valeria Aranda**	2019-	?	?	?	?
(Mexico) Andrea Lozano**	2022-2024	20	19	0	9

*Has only raced in the NASCAR Challenge Series (run in the same races at the same time with NASCAR Mexico Series)

**Has only raced in the NASCAR Trucks Mexico Series

== Other NASCAR series ==
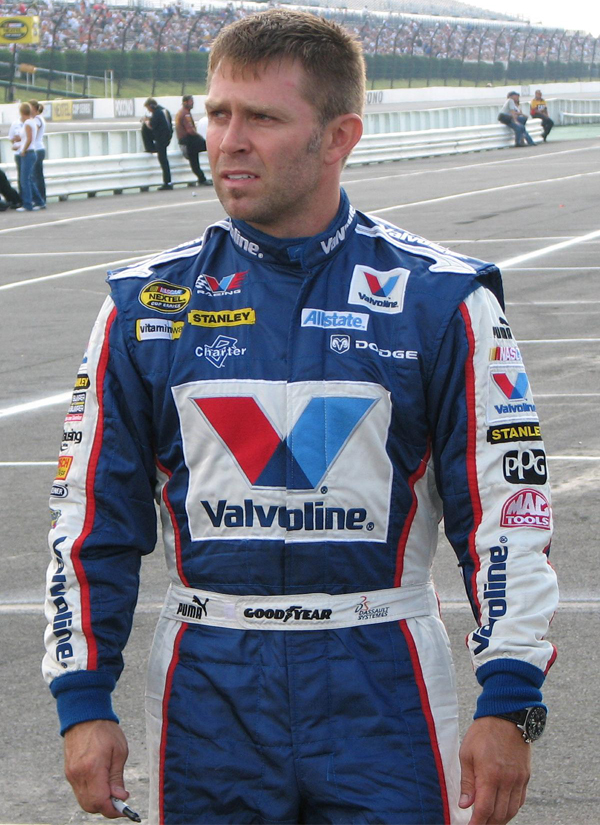
Scott Riggs

While some NASCAR Mexico Series drivers have taken part in Xfinity Series and Truck Series races, only Jorge Goeters and Daniel Suárez have raced in both the NASCAR Cup Series and NASCAR Mexico Series. Additionally, Scott Riggs, Cody Ware, and Kevin O'Connell have all only made one start in the Mexico Series but have also taken part in Cup Series races.

Rubén Pardo, Rogelio López and Rubén García Jr. have all achieved victories in the regional K&N Pro Series East; while Daniel Suárez has won in the K&N Pro Series East, and all three of NASCAR's domestic national series (the Xfinity Series, Truck Series and Cup Series).

In 2016, Suárez won the NASCAR Xfinity Series championship, driving for Joe Gibbs Racing, before moving up to the NASCAR Cup Series the following year, driving the No. 19 for Joe Gibbs Racing. In 2019, he moved to the No. 41 driving for Stewart–Haas Racing before moving to the No. 96 driving for Gaunt Brothers Racing, then moved to the No. 99 for Trackhouse Racing Team. On June 12, 2022, Suárez won his first career NASCAR Cup Series race at Sonoma Raceway.

=== NASCAR Cup Series drivers ===
Five drivers have raced both the NASCAR Mexico and NASCAR Cup Series.

Driver	Seasons	Cup Starts	Mexico Series Starts	Wins	Top 5	Top 10
(Mexico) Jorge Goeters	2004–Present	1	150	13	60	98
(Mexico) Daniel Suárez	2009–2014	195	76	10	26	39
(United States) Scott Riggs	2010	208	1	0	0	0
(United States) Cody Ware	2014	71	1	0	0	0
(United States) Kevin O'Connell	2015	1	1	0	0	0
