= 2003 MasterCard Truck Series =

The 2003 MasterCard Truck Series was the second and final season of MasterCard Truck Series. César Tiberio Jiménez was proclaimed champion. This series was replaced by Desafío Corona the next year.

== Results ==
Round	Date	Race	Venue	Winner
1	April 26	(Mexico) Guadalajara	Trióvalo Bernardo Obregón	Oscar Ruiz
2	July 12	(Mexico) Monterrey	Autódromo Monterrey	Jorge Goeters
3	July 13	(Mexico) Monterrey	Autódromo Monterrey	Jorge Goeters
4	August 16	Mexico	Estadio Azteca	Jorge Goeters
5	August 17	Mexico	Estadio Azteca	Jorge Goeters
6	September 27	(Mexico) Guadalajara	Trióvalo Bernardo Obregón	Gianfranco Cané
7	September 28	(Mexico) Guadalajara	Trióvalo Bernardo Obregón	Gianfranco Cané
8	October 18	(Mexico) Monterrey	Autódromo Monterrey	Jorge Goeters
9	October 19	(Mexico) Monterrey	Autódromo Monterrey	César T. Jiménez
10	November 7	(United States) San Antonio	San Antonio Speedway	Héctor Rached
11	November 8	(United States) San Antonio	San Antonio Speedway	Jorge Goeters
12	December 6	Mexico	Autódromo Hermanos Rodríguez	Cesar T. Jiménez
13	December 7	Mexico	Autódromo Hermanos Rodríguez	Cesar T. Jiménez

- Estadio Azteca was racing venue for only time. A 500 meters oval was mounted in the parking lot.

== Standings ==
Rank	Driver	(Mexico) GDL	(Mexico) MTY		(Mexico) MXC		(Mexico) GDL		(Mexico) MTY		(United States) SAS		(Mexico) MXC		Points
Rank	Driver	(Mexico) GDL	R1	R2	R1	R2	R1	R2	R1	R2	R1	R2	R1	R2	Points
1	César Tiberio Jiménez	3	2	6	14	8	3	4	3	1	3	11	1	1	1617
2	Gianfranco Cané	2	13	2	2	18	1	1	5	17	4	12	13	11	1588
3	Jonathan Manautou	4	20	4	7	6	8	19	6	12	2	2	16	3	1504
4	Jorge Goeters		1	1	1	1	DSQ	2	1	5	5	1	2	7	1445
5	Javier de la Parra	8	4	15	11	3	12	15	18	11	6	4	7	4	1417
6	Héctor Sánchez	6	6	5	8	9	15	18	12	9	8	9	6	6	1400
7	Héctor Rached	16	15	9	10	5	2	16	7	7	1	5	11	17	1292
8	Oscar Ruiz	1	3	12	12	10	4	6	2	2			18		1266
9	Sebastían Ocaranza Sr.	18	10	8	18	2	5	17	4	15	9	3	19	2	1258
10	Jesús Castellanos	7	19			16	13	7	9	8	7	10	8	8	1097
