= Autódromo Panamá =

- Location: Chame, Panamá Oeste Province, Panama
- Coordinates: 8°42′16″N 79°51′38″W
- FIA Grade: 3
- Opened: 24 April 2024; 2 years ago
- Major events: Current: GT Challenge de las Américas (2024–present); TCR Panama (2025–present)

Full Circuit (2024–present)
- Length: 2.600 km (1.616 mi)
- Turns: 15

The Autódromo Panamá is a motor racing circuit located in the corregimiento of Sajalices, Chame District, Panamá Oeste Province, Panama, approximately 35 km (22 mi) west of the historic district of Panama City.

The circuit officially opened in 2024, hosting the first round of the International Drag Racing Championship. The official inauguration ceremony took place on 21 April 2024 with the Gran Premio Panamá, held as part of the GT Challenge of the Americas.

The main circuit has a length of 2.600 km (1.616 mi) and its layout was designed and supervised in accordance with standards approved by the Fédération Internationale de l'Automobile (FIA).

== General information ==
The FIA approved the construction plans submitted by the project promoters, allowing the development of the circuit to proceed. The facility includes dedicated areas for drivers, mechanics, support vehicles, pit lane infrastructure and garages.

Since its opening, Autódromo Panamá has hosted various national and regional motorsport championships.

== International recognition ==
In May 2025, Autódromo Panamá hosted the official debut of the TCR Panama Touring Car Championship championship, sanctioned by TCR International Series and included in the global TCR World Ranking system. This milestone positioned Panama among the few Latin American countries with a nationally sanctioned TCR category operating under international standards, further establishing the circuit as a key venue for professional motorsport in the region.

== Circuit details ==
- 15 corners
- Track width: between 10 and 12 m (33 and 39 ft)
- 3 grandstands
- 4 lounge areas
- 2 main access points
- Spectator areas including panoramic viewing zones and pit lane access
- Parking facilities for more than 4,000 vehicles
- Capacity for over 15,000 spectators
- Sponsor, food and beverage areas
- Sanitary facilities
