= NASCAR Mikel's Truck Series =

Former NASCAR series

Mikel's Truck Series
- Category: Stock cars
- Country: Mexico; United States
- Inaugural season: 2002
- Constructors: Chevrolet; Dodge; Ford
- Drivers' champion: César Tiberio Jiménez

The NASCAR Mikel's Truck Series (formerly known as the MasterCard Truck Series) is a Mexican pickup truck racing predecessor of Desafío Corona.

== Drivers ==
NASCAR Corona Series drivers participated in the MasterCard Truck Series, including Jorge Goeters, Patrick Goeters, Marcelo Nuñez, César Tiberio Jiménez, Sebastián Ocaranza, Sebastián Ocaranza, Jr., Julio Bracho, Jr., José González, and Oscar Ruiz. In 2017 the series was revived as the NASCAR Mikel's Truck Series.

== Manufacturers ==
In the 2002 season, only Chevrolet took part. In the 2003 season, Dodge was added to the category. In the 2016 revival inwards Ford was added as a manufacturer.

== Races ==
21 races were held, all in ovals, with eight in 2002 and 13 in 2003. In 2002 and 2003, it ran in San Antonio, Texas, and an oval in the Estadio Azteca park lot was included. In the 2016 revival road courses became part of the schedule.

== Champions ==
Season	Driver	Manufacturer
2002	(Mexico) Jorge Goeters	(United States) Chevrolet
2003	(Mexico) César Tiberio Jiménez	(United States) Chevrolet
2017	(Mexico) Alex de Alba	(United States) Ford
2018	(Mexico) Max Gutiérrez	(United States) Chevrolet
2019	(Mexico) Jorge de la Parra	(United States) Ford
2020	(Mexico) Andrés Pérez de Lara	(United States) ???
2021	(Mexico) Giancarlo Vecchi	(United States) ???
2022	(Mexico) Eloy Sebastián	(United States) ???
2023	(Mexico) Diego Ortiz	(United States) Ford
2024	(Mexico) Gerardo Rodríguez	(United States) Ford
