= Sajalices =

- Corregimiento
- Location within Panama
- Coordinates: 8°40′48″N 79°52′12″W
- Country: Panama
- Province: Panamá Oeste
- District: Chame

Area
  - Land: 24.8 km^{2} (9.6 sq mi)

Population (2010)
  - Total: 2,280
  - Density: 92/km^{2} (240/sq mi)
- Population density calculated based on land area.
- Time zone: UTC−5 (EST)

Sajalices is a corregimiento in Chame District, Panamá Oeste Province, Panama with a population of 2,280 as of 2010. Its population as of 1990 was 1,301; its population as of 2000 was 1,825.
