= Julio Rejón =

Mexican racing driver (born 1993)

- Nationality: Mexican
- Born: Julio Rejón Basañez; 9 September 1993 (age 33) Mexico City, Mexico

NASCAR Mexico Series career
- Debut season: 2017
- Current team: JV Motorsports
- Car number: 55
- Wins: 5

Championship titles
- 2024: TCR Mexico Series

Julio Rejón Basañez (born 9 September 1993) is a Mexican racing driver. He competes in the NASCAR Mexico Series driving for JV Motorsports and the TCR Mexico Series driving for ProRally Mothers. He is the inaugural TCR Mexico champion.

== Career ==
=== Early career ===
Rejón began his racing career in karting, which he competed from 2012 to 2013, where his best result would be third place in the Sierra Esmeralda Championship in the Shifter Honda 125cc S1 category.

=== Formula 4 ===
In 2022, Rejón competed in the NACAM Formula 4 Championship for ProRally Mothers driver along with his brother Rodrigo Rejón, being his first time in single-seater competitions. At the end of the season, he would finish second place in the championship with three victories, two poles, three fastest laps, eight podiums and adding 274 points.

=== NASCAR ===
Rejón made his NASCAR Mexico debut in 2017, making five starts in the Mexico Series. The following season, he would compete in the Mexico Challenge Series, remaining there until the 2022 season, where he finished in second place driving for JV Motorsports. Remaining with that team, he returned to the Mexico Series in 2023.

=== TCR Mexico ===
Rejón competed in the inaugural season of the TCR Mexico Series, driving for ProRally Mothers, where he became their first champion. This led him to compete in the opening round of the 2025 TCR World Tour in Mexico.
