= San Antonio Speedway =

Oval asphalt race track in Texas, United States

Coordinates: 29.2749°N 98.5744°W

San Antonio Speedway is a former asphalt short track that was located in San Antonio, Texas.

== History ==
The speedway was opened in 1977 after a team of 30 race car owners led by Donald Bierschwale funded its construction. During the speedway's early history, it faced stiff competition from the Pan American Speedway located on the other side of San Antonio. San Antonio Speedway would ultimately supersede Pan American Speedway as San Antonio's main racing track after it was forced to shut down in 1978. After a tumultuous few decades San Antonio Speedway closed down at the end of 2007. After a change of ownership the speedway briefly resumed operations in 2012 before permanently closing in 2013.
