= Salvador de Alba =

Mexican racing driver (born 1999)

- Born: Salvador de Alba Jr. 11 December 1999 (age 26); Guadalajara, Jalisco, Mexico

Indy NXT career
- Debut season: 2024
- Current team: Andretti Global
- Car number: 27
- Starts: 28
- Championships: 0
- Wins: 1
- Podiums: 4
- Poles: 1
- Fastest laps: 0
- Best finish: 5th in 2024

Previous series
- 2022 2017–21 2014: Indy Pro 2000 Championship; NASCAR PEAK Mexico Series; Formula 4 Sudamericana

Championship titles
- 2021, 2023 2024: NASCAR Mexico Series; GTM Pro 1

Salvador de Alba Jr. (born 11 December 1999) is a Mexican racing driver who competes full-time in Indy NXT driving for HMD Motorsports, having previously driven for Andretti Global. He is a two-time NASCAR PEAK Mexico Series champion, winning it in 2021 and 2023 and four-time Gran turismo (SuperCopa) Mexico champion, winning it in 2019, 2021, 2022 and 2023.

== Karting record ==
=== Karting career summary ===
Season	Series	Team	Position
2010	SKUSA SuperNationals XIV - S5 Junior	Ferdez Racing	12th
2011	SKUSA SuperNationals XV - S5 Junior		7th
2012	SKUSA SuperNationals XVI - S5 Junior	SKUSA Mexico/Casillas Racing	5th
2013	México National Karting Championship		11th
2013	SKUSA SuperNationals XVII - S5 Junior		12th
2014	FIA México National Karting Championship - Reto Telmex	VCI	2nd
2014	NACAM-Codasur FIA de las Americas	Mexico	15th
2015	SKUSA SuperNationals XIX - S2	Team GP/VCI	9th

== Racing record ==
=== Racing career summary ===
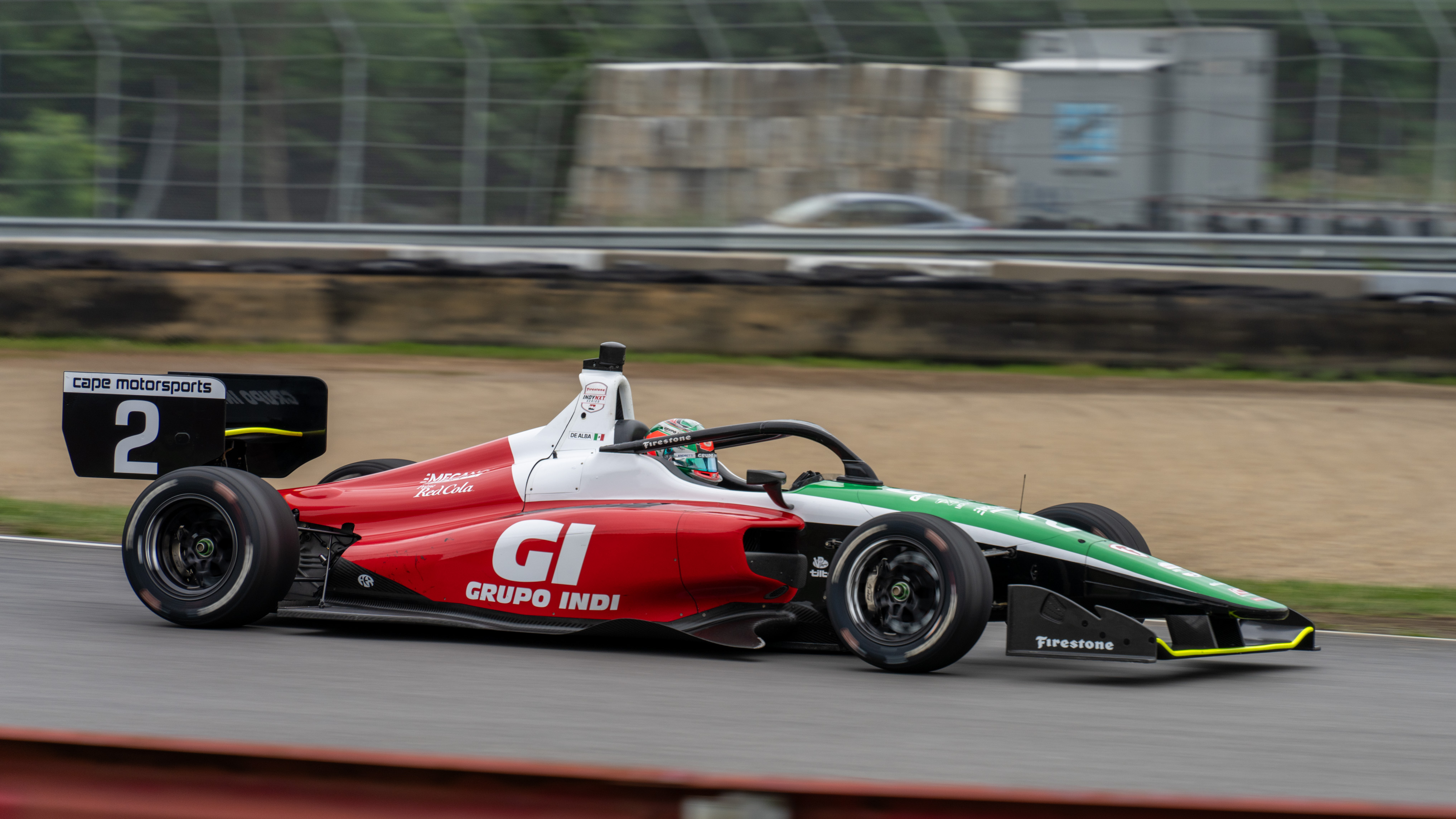
De Alba in his 2024 Indy NXT car at Mid-Ohio

Season	Series	Team	Races	Wins	Poles	F/Laps	Podiums	Points	Position
2014	Formula 4 Sudamericana		2	0	0	0	0	12	21st
2017	NASCAR PEAK Mexico	Sidral Aga Racing Team Toyota	12	0	2	0	1	380	12th
2018	NASCAR PEAK Mexico	Sidral Aga Racing Team Toyota	12	1	4	0	3	419	6th
2019	NASCAR PEAK Mexico	Sidral Aga Racing Team Toyota	12	3	5	0	5	475	**2nd**
2019	GTM Pro 1	Sidral Aga Racing	16						**1st**
2020	NASCAR PEAK Mexico	Sidral Aga Racing Team Toyota	12	2	2	0	5	445	4th
2020	GTM Pro 1	Sidral Aga Racing	16						**2nd**
2021	NASCAR PEAK Mexico	Sidral Aga Racing Team Toyota	12	4	4	0	7	394	**1st**
2021	GTM Pro 1	Sidral Aga Racing	16						**1st**
2022	Indy Pro 2000 Championship	Jay Howard Driver Development	17	2	1	2	4	289	8th
2022	NASCAR PEAK Mexico	Sidral Aga Racing Team Toyota	12	1	4	2	3	392	5th
2022	GTM Pro 1	Sidral Aga Racing	16						**1st**
2023	USF Pro 2000 Championship	Exclusive Autosport	18	1	0	2	4	291	**3rd**
2023	NASCAR Mexico	Sidral Aga Racing Team Toyota	12	3	2	0	6	444	**1st**
2023	GTM Pro 1	Sidral Aga Racing	18						**1st**
2024	Indy NXT	Andretti Cape Indy NXT	14	0	0	0	2	331	5th
2024	NASCAR Mexico	Sidral Aga Racing Team Toyota	1	0	0	0	0	18	21st
2024	GTM Pro 1	Sidral Aga Racing	16						**1st**
2025	Indy NXT	Andretti Global	14	1	1	1	3	418	5th
2025	GTM Pro 1	Sidral Aga Racing	10	8					3rd*
2026	Indy NXT	HMD Motorsports	14	0	0	0	0	245	16th

=== American open–wheel racing results ===
==== Indy / USF Pro 2000 Championship ====
Year	Team	1	2	3	4	5	6	7	8	9	10	11	12	13	14	15	16	17	18	Rank	Points
2022	Jay Howard Driver Development	STP; 1; 9	STP; 2; 15	ALA; 1; 15	ALA; 2; 8	IMS; 1; 1*	IMS; 2; 6	IMS; 3; 16	IRP; 8	ROA; 1; 4	ROA; 2; 3	MOH; 1; 2	MOH; 2; 5	TOR; 1; 14	TOR; 2 DNS	GMP; 1	POR; 1; 8	POR; 2; 6	POR; 3; 7	8th	289
2023	Exclusive Autosport	STP; 1; 7	STP; 2; 17	SEB; 1; 7	SEB; 2; 16	IMS; 1; 6	IMS; 2; 2	IRP; 1*	ROA; 1; 14	ROA; 2; 10	MOH; 1; 10	MOH; 2; 4	TOR; 1; 2	TOR; 2; 5	COTA; 1; 8	COTA; 1; 5	POR; 1; 6	POR; 2; 11	POR; 3; 2	3rd	291

==== Indy NXT ====
(key) (Races in bold indicate pole position) (Races in italics indicate fastest lap) (Races with ^{L} indicate a race lap led) (Races with * indicate most race laps led)

Year	Team	1	2	3	4	5	6	7	8	9	10	11	12	13	14	15	16	17	Rank	Points
2024	Andretti Cape Indy NXT	STP; 9	BAR; 10	IMS; 11	IMS; 9	DET; 7	ROA; 21	LAG; 11	LAG; 5	MOH; 16	IOW; 3	GTW; 4	POR; 12	MIL; 3	NSH; 5				5th	331
2025	Andretti Global	STP; 5	BAR; 11	IMS; 5	IMS; 4	DET; 8	GMP; 4	RDA; 8	MOH; 4	IOW; 3	LAG; 19	LAG; 9	POR; 5	MIL; 1^{L}*	**NSH**; 2^{L}*				5th	418
2026	HMD Motorsports	STP; 8	ARL; 20	BAR; 18	BAR; 11	IMS; 13	IMS; 10	DET; 12	GAT; 22	ROA; 18	ROA; 8	MOH; 4	MOH; 11	NSS; 12	POR	MIL; 19	LAG	LAG	16th	245
