= Abraham Calderón =

Mexican racing driver (born 1988)

- Born: November 25, 1988 (age 37); Monterrey, Mexico

NASCAR Mexico Series career
- 171 races run over 14 years
- Car no., team: No. 2 (Monica Morales)
- 2021 position: 3rd
- Best finish: 1st (2014), (2017)
- First race: 2009 Queretaro 150 (Querétaro)
- Last race: 2022 Gran Premio Chihuahua (Chihuahua)
- First win: 2013 Toyota 120 (Phoenix)
- Last win: 2021 Gran Premio Guadalajara (Guadalajara)
| Wins | Top tens | Poles |
|---|---|---|
| 13 | 101 | 3 |
- Statistics up to date as of March 21, 2015.

Abraham Calderón (born November 25, 1988) is a Mexican professional stock car racing driver from Monterrey. He currently drives the No. 2 ARRIS Toyota in the NASCAR Mexico Series. In 2014, he won the Toyota Series championship; previously he had already won the 2006 NASCAR Mexico T4 Series championship.

== Motorsports career results ==
=== NASCAR ===
(key) (Bold – Pole position awarded by qualifying time. Italics – Pole position earned by points standings or practice time. * – Most laps led.)

==== K&N Pro Series East ====
NASCAR K&N Pro Series East results
| Year | Team | No. | Make | 1 | 2 | 3 | 4 | 5 | 6 | 7 | 8 | 9 | 10 | 11 | 12 | 13 | 14 | NKNPSEC | Pts | Ref |
|---|---|---|---|---|---|---|---|---|---|---|---|---|---|---|---|---|---|---|---|---|
| 2018 | NextGen Motorsports | 55 | Toyota | NSM; 16 | BRI | LGY | SBO | SBO | MEM | NJM | TMP | NHA; 19 | IOW | GLN | GTW | NHA | DOV | 36th | 53 | |

==== PEAK Mexico Series ====
^{*} Season still in progress
^{1} Ineligible for series points
