= Max Gutiérrez =

Mexican racing driver

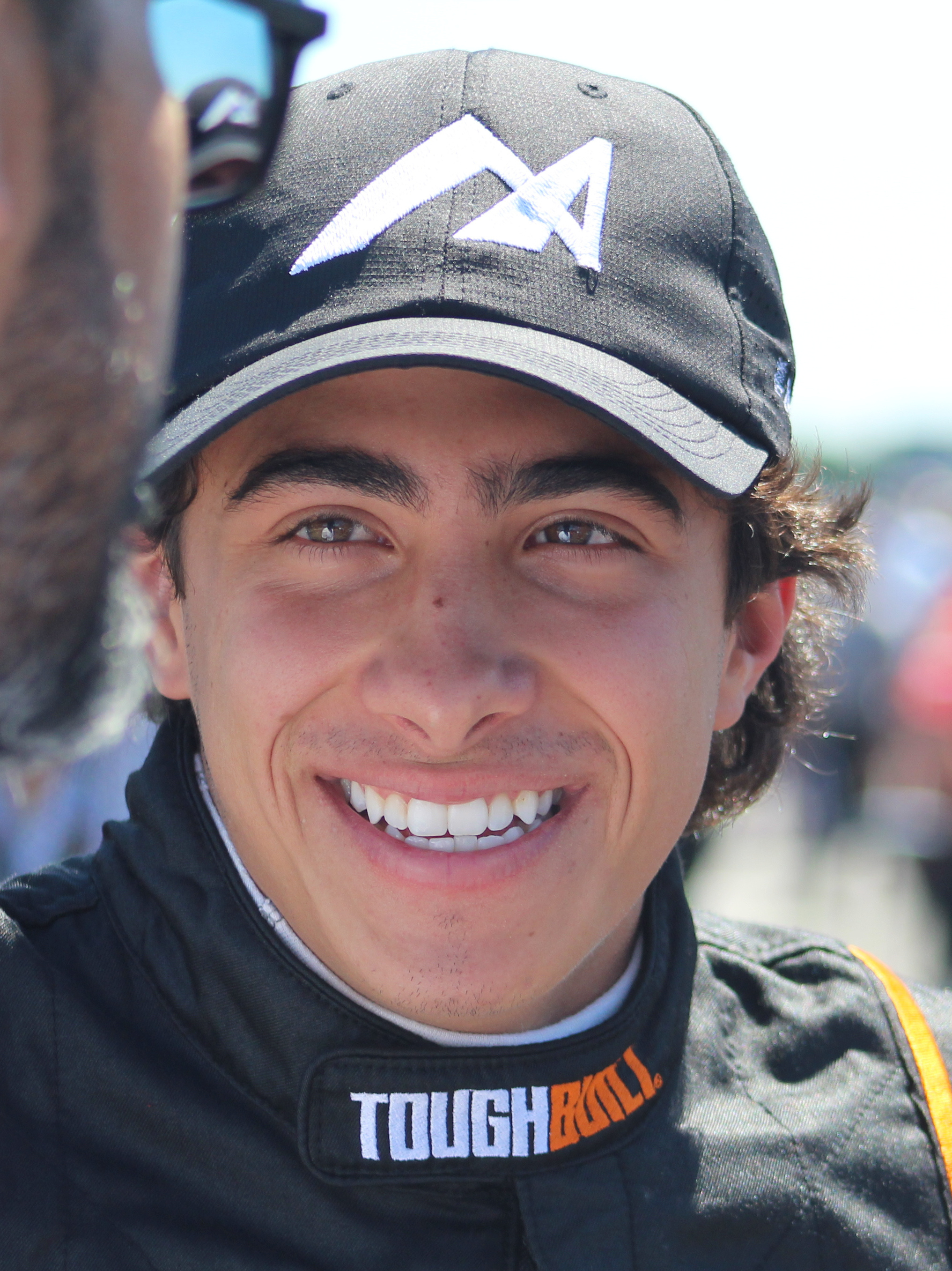
- Gutiérrez at Pocono Raceway in 2022
- Born: Maximiliano Gutiérrez Hoppe; December 18, 2002 (age 23); Mexico City, Mexico

NASCAR FedEx Freight Truck Series career
- 5 races run over 2 years
- 2023 position: 65th
- Best finish: 40th (2022)
- First race: 2022 North Carolina Education Lottery 200 (Charlotte)
- Last race: 2023 Victoria's Voice Foundation 200 (Las Vegas)
Wins	Top tens	Poles
0	1	0

NASCAR Mexico Series career
- 13 races run over 2 years
- 2021 position: 4th
- Best finish: 4th (2021)
- First race: 2021 Gran Premio Chiapas (Chiapas)
- Last race: 2022 Gran Premio Nus-kah (Chiapas)
Wins	Top tens	Poles
0	11	0

ARCA Menards Series career
- 7 races run over 3 years
- Best finish: 30th (2021)
- First race: 2020 Bush's Beans 200 (Bristol)
- Last race: 2022 General Tire 200 (Talladega)
Wins	Top tens	Poles
0	1	0

ARCA Menards Series East career
- 11 races run over 3 years
- Best finish: 4th (2021)
- First race: 2020 Bush's Beans 200 (Bristol)
- Last race: 2022 Race to Stop Suicide 200 (New Smyrna)
- First win: 2021 Jeep Beach 175 (New Smyrna)
Wins	Top tens	Poles
1	6	0

ARCA Menards Series West career
- 1 race run over 1 year
- First race: 2021 Arizona Lottery 100 (Phoenix)
Wins	Top tens	Poles
0	0	0
- Statistics up to date as of July 23, 2022.

Maximiliano Gutiérrez Hoppe (born December 18, 2002) is a Mexican professional stock car racing driver. He competes full-time in the NASCAR Mexico Series, driving the No. 23 Chevrolet Camaro for Canel's Racing. He previously competed in the NASCAR Craftsman Truck Series.

== Racing career ==
=== Early career ===
Gutiérrez began racing at three years old in the Mexico National Super Kart Championship in 2006, where he finished third in the standings in the Baby Stock category. He returned in 2007, again finishing third in the Modified Baby 50 category. From 2008 to 2013, he won six consecutive Super Kart Championship titles.

In 2017, Gutiérrez competed full-time in the NASCAR Mikel's Truck Series, winning Rookie of the Year honors. He won the championship in 2018.

Gutiérrez moved up to the Mexico T4 Series (now Mexico T4 Series) in 2019, earning two wins, seven top-fives, and eight top-tens, finishing fifth in the standings. He returned to the series in 2020, where he won the championship with five wins, ten top-five, and 11 top-tens.

Gutiérrez moved up to the NASCAR PEAK Mexico Series full-time in 2021. He earned eight top-fives, ten top-tens, and finished fourth in the final standings.

=== ARCA Menards Series East ===
On September 17, 2020, Gutiérrez made his ARCA Menards Series East debut at Bristol Motor Speedway, driving the No. 53 for Troy Williams Racing, starting 26th and finishing 14th. He later competed in the East Series race at Five Flags Speedway, starting 14th and finishing 12th. He did not return to Troy Williams Racing after 2020.

On February 5, 2021, Gutiérrez announced that he would drive full-time in the East Series, driving the No. 30 Ford Fusion for Rette Jones Racing.

On February 8, 2021, three days after the announcement, Gutiérrez earned his first career East Series win, after taking the lead on the final turn, defeating Sammy Smith and Taylor Gray in a three wide finish. He finished the season with one win, two top-fives, and five top-tens, and ranked fourth in the standings.

=== ARCA Menards Series ===
Gutiérrez made one start in the 2020 ARCA Menards Series season, driving for Troy Williams Racing.

Gutiérrez returned for the 2021 ARCA Menards Series, running the races that were paired with the East Series, with his best finish being 12th at Iowa Speedway.

Gutiérrez returned to the series in 2022, scoring his first career top-ten at Talladega Superspeedway in April.

=== ARCA Menards Series West ===
Gutiérrez made his first ARCA Menards Series West start at PHO, starting 12th and finishing 21st.

=== Craftsman Truck Series ===
On April 23, 2022, it was announced that Gutiérrez would make his NASCAR Camping World Truck Series debut in the Charlotte, driving the No. 37 for AM Racing. Due to the small number of owner points for the 37 truck, Gutiérrez would attempt to qualify on speed. Since only 35 cars were entered, Gutiérrez made his debut. He started 31st and finished in 26th. Gutiérrez made his second start at the Nashville, this time in the 22 truck, as the original driver, Austin Wayne Self, was on paternity leave after the birth of his daughter. Gutiérrez originally qualified 17th, but due to his truck being too low to the ground, he started from the rear. He finished in eighth, scoring his first career top-ten in only his second start.

== Personal life ==
On January 29, 2023, Max and his brother, Federico, were travelling near Valle de Bravo, Mexico in a Porsche Boxster, when their vehicle collided with a Ford Explorer pickup truck. Max was airlifted to a hospital in Mexico City with undisclosed injuries, while Federico, who was driving the vehicle at the time, was pronounced dead at the scene. The investigation is currently ongoing.

== Motorsport career results ==
=== NASCAR ===
(key) (Bold – Pole position awarded by qualifying time. Italics – Pole position earned by points standings or practice time. * – Most laps led.)

=== Craftsman Truck Series ===
NASCAR Craftsman Truck Series results
Year	Team	No.	Make	1	2	3	4	5	6	7	8	9	10	11	12	13	14	15	16	17	18	19	20	21	22	23	NCTC	Pts	Ref
2022	AM Racing	37	Chevy	DAY	LVS	ATL	COA	MAR	BRI	DAR	KAN	TEX	CLT; 26	GTW	SON	KNO											40th	72	
2022	AM Racing	22	Chevy														NSH; 8	MOH	POC; 21	IRP	RCH	KAN	BRI	TAL	HOM; 21	PHO	40th	72	
2023	AM Racing	22	Ford	DAY	LVS; 21	ATL	COA	TEX	BRD	MAR	KAN	DAR	NWS	CLT	GTW	NSH	MOH	POC	RCH	IRP	MLW	KAN	BRI	TAL	HOM	PHO	65th	16	

=== ARCA Menards Series ===
ARCA Menards Series results
Year	Team	No.	Make	1	2	3	4	5	6	7	8	9	10	11	12	13	14	15	16	17	18	19	20	AMSC	Pts	Ref
2020	Troy Williams Racing	53E	Toyota	DAY	PHO	TAL	POC	IRP	KEN	IOW	KAN	TOL	TOL	MCH	DAY	GTW	L44	TOL	BRI; 14	WIN	MEM	ISF	KAN	71st	30	
2021	Rette Jones Racing	30	Ford	DAY	PHO	TAL	KAN	TOL	CLT; 15	MOH	POC	ELK	BLN	IOW; 12	WIN	GLN	MCH	ISF	MLW; 15	DSF	BRI; 14	SLM	KAN	30th	120	
2022	AM Racing	32	Chevy	DAY; 32	PHO	TAL; 10	KAN	CLT	IOW	BLN	ELK	MOH	POC	IRP	MCH	GLN	ISF	MLW	DSF	KAN	BRI	SLM	TOL	70th	46	

==== ARCA Menards Series East ====
ARCA Menards Series East results
Year	Team	No.	Make	1	2	3	4	5	6	7	8	AMSEC	Pts	Ref
2020	Troy Williams Racing	53E	Toyota	NSM	TOL	DOV	TOL	BRI; 14				16th	112	
2020	Troy Williams Racing	53	Toyota						FIF; 12			16th	112	
2021	Rette Jones Racing	30	Ford	NSM; 1	FIF; 7	NSV; 9	DOV; 5	SNM; 10	IOW; 12	MLW; 15	BRI; 14	4th	383	
2022	Rette Jones Racing	30	Ford	NSM; 3	FIF	DOV; Wth	NSV	IOW	MLW	BRI		37th	41	

==== ARCA Menards Series West ====
ARCA Menards Series West results
Year	Team	No.	Make	1	2	3	4	5	6	7	8	9	AMSWC	Pts	Ref
2021	Rette Jones Racing	30	Ford	PHO	SON	IRW	CNS	IRW	PIR	LVS	AAS	PHO; 21	60th	23	
