= El Dorado Speedway =

Motorsports venue in Juan Aldama, Mexico

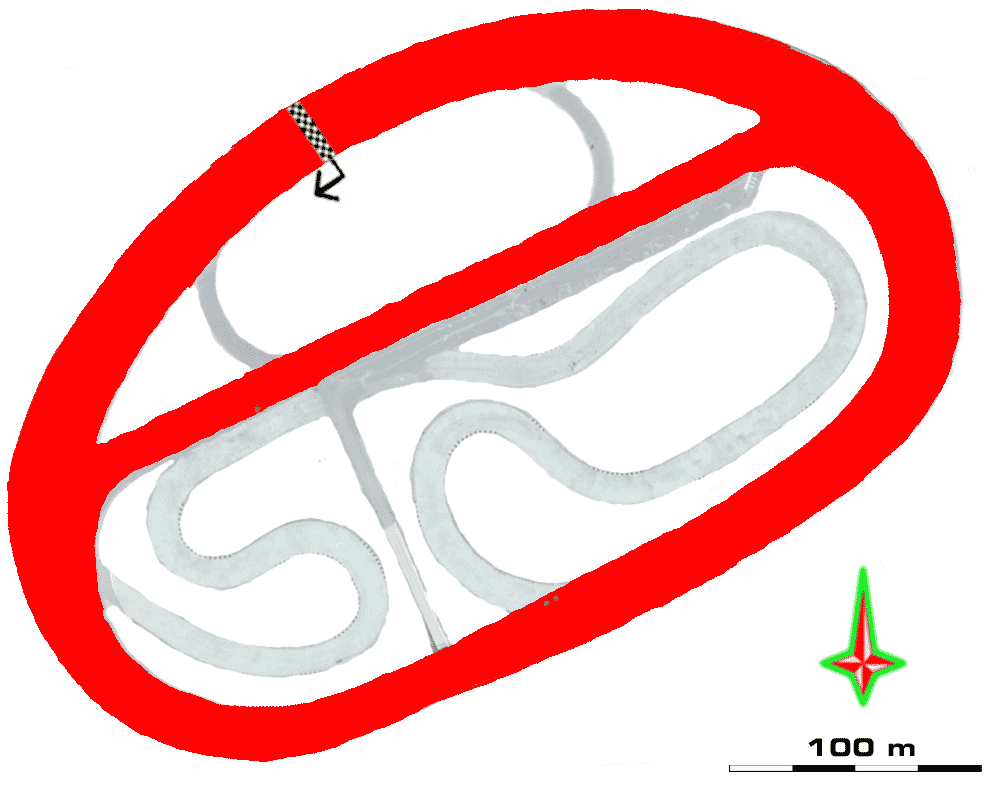
- Oval (2012–present)
- Location: Juan Aldama, Chihuahua
- Coordinates: 28°49′22.8″N 105°57′3.6″W
- Broke ground: 13 December 2011; 13 years ago
- Opened: 28 October 2012; 12 years ago
- Major events: Former: NASCAR Mexico Series (2012–2015, 2018–2019, 2022–2024)

Oval (2012–present)
- Surface: Asphalt
- Length: 0.625 mi (1.006 km)
- Turns: 4
- Banking: 20° (turns); 14° (front stretch); 11° (back stretch)

El Dorado Speedway is a motorsports venue in Juan Aldama, Chihuahua near the state capital of Chihuahua City. It hosted the NASCAR Mexico Series.

== About ==
Construction on El Dorado Speedway began in 2011 and was completed in 2012. The main layout of the speedway is a 1.006 km (0.625 mi) D-shaped concrete oval. The track also features a smaller oval and an infield road course, or a "roval".
