= Super Óvalo Potosino =

Racetrack near San Luis Potosí, Mexico

- Location: San Luis Potosí
- Coordinates: 22°05′29″N 100°43′32″W
- Capacity: 8,200
- Broke ground: 1983 (rebuilt in 2005)
- Opened: 1983
- Former names: Autódromo Potosino
- Major events: Current: NASCAR Mexico Series; Potosina 200 (2005–2015, 2017–present)

Oval Circuit (2005–present)
- Surface: Asphalt
- Length: 0.804 km (0.500 mi)
- Turns: 4
- Banking: 7° to 9°
- Race lap record: 0:21.706 (Rafael Martínez, #18 Canel's Ford, 2007, Corona Series)

Original Circuit (1983–2004)
- Surface: Asphalt
- Length: 1.239 km (0.770 mi)
- Turns: 5

The Super Óvalo Potosino (formerly Autódromo Potosino) is a half-mile paved oval located near the city of San Luis Potosí in Mexico.

The track was opened in 1983 as a 0.770 mi (1.239 km) road course. It was built by Promotodo, an enterprise owned by Michel Jourdain Sr., which organized the defunct Marlboro Cup, which was arguably the most important racing series in the country at that time.

In 2005, after several years of not being used, the track was rebuilt as a half-mile oval to host NASCAR events.

The track is used primarily by the NASCAR Mexico Series. A few local events are also held.

In 2009, due to the swine flu outbreak, they cancelled the race that was supposed to be held on May 3; the race was rescheduled for August 16 and was won by Jorge Goeters.
