= 2009 NASCAR Corona Series =

Seasons
- ← 2008 2010 →

The 2009 NASCAR Corona Series was the sixth season of the Corona Series, which was sanctioned by NASCAR Mexico. It was marred by the fatal accident of Carlos Pardo.

== New for this season ==
All five previous NASCAR Mexico series champions raced the full schedule in 2009.

The Rookie of the Year championship adopted a points system similar to those used in NASCAR's national series, with points going from ten to one for rookies only, and bonus points for top-ten finishes in the overall race.

== Drivers ==
These are the entries for the 2009 season.

Team	Manufacturer	No.	Race Driver	Rounds
FCV		0	Rafael Vallina	All
FCV		4	Carlos Contreras	All
FCV		49	Jorge Arteaga	All
Escuderia Telmex		1	Antonio Pérez	1–14
Escuderia Telmex		1	Ricardo Pérez de Lara	15–16
Escuderia Telmex		5	Rubén Rovelo	All
Equipo Telcel		2	Germán Quiroga	All
Equipo Telcel		3	Rogelio López	All
2B Racing		7	Carlos Peralta	All
2B Racing		10	Oscar Peralta	1–14, 16
2B Racing		77	Abraham Calderón	All
MM		11	Hugo Oliveras	All
MM		15	Patrick Goeters	All
Motorcraft		12	Rubén Pardo	All
Motorcraft		21	Carlos Pardo	1–4
Motorcraft		22	Irwin Vences	All
Plata Motorsport		17	Fernando Plata	1, 3–14
Plata Motorsport		71	Israel Jaitovich	3–14
Team GP		18	Rafael Martínez	All
Team GP		19	Freddy Tame, Jr.	1–14, 16
Team GP		31	Jorge Goeters	All
H&High Speed		20	Homero Richards	All
Jünker Motorsport		24	Juan Carlos Herrero	1–6
Jünker Motorsport		32	Ricardo Pérez de Lara	1, 4–5, 9, 12
Seman Baker		38	Jorge Seeman	5, 13–14
Seman Baker		83	Elliott VanRankin	3–14
Seman Baker		87	Luis Felipe Montaño	3–7, 15–16

== 2009 calendar ==
2009 NCS venues.

The race calendar for this season and results is as follows: In this season was inaugurated the Autódromo Internacional de Aguascalientes with the first race of the season.

No.	Race Title	Track	Date	Time	
No.	Race Title	Track	Date	Local	UTC
1	Aguascalientes	Autódromo Internacional de Aguascalientes, Aguascalientes	April 12	13:10	18:10
2	Chiapas	Autódromo Chiapas, Berriozábal	May 17	13:10	18:10
3	San Luis Potosí	(San Luis Potosí) Autódromo Potosino, Zaragoza	May 31	13:10	18:10
4	Puebla	Autódromo Miguel E. Abed, Puebla	June 14	13:10	18:10
5	Quéretaro	Autódromo Querétaro, El Marqués	June 28	13:10	18:10
6	Guadalajara	(Jalisco) Trióvalo Bernardo Obregón, Guadalajara	July 19	13:10	18:10
7	Zacatecas	Autódromo Internacional de Zacatecas, Zacatecas	August 2	13:10	18:10
8	San Luis Potosí	(San Luis Potosí) Autódromo Potosino, Zaragoza	August 16	13:10	18:10
9	Puebla	Autódromo Miguel E. Abed, Puebla	September 6	13:10	18:10
10	Monterrey	(Nuevo León) Autódromo Monterrey, Apodaca	September 20	13:10	18:10
11	Quéretaro	Autódromo Querétaro, El Marqués	October 11	13:10	18:10
12	Mexico City	Autódromo Hermanos Rodríguez, Mexico City	October 25	13:10	18:10
13	Chiapas	Autódromo Chiapas, Berriozábal	November 8	13:10	19:10
14	Aguascalientes	Autódromo Internacional de Aguascalientes, Aguascalientes	November 22	13:10	19:10

Oval
Road Course

== Results ==
=== Races ===
No.	Race	Pole position	Most laps led	Winning driver	Winning manufacturer
1	Aguascalientes	Rubén Rovelo	Germán Quiroga	Germán Quiroga	Ford
2	Chiapas	Germán Quiroga^{1}	Germán Quiroga	Rogelio López	Dodge
3	San Luis Potosí	Germán Quiroga^{2}	Germán Quiroga	Germán Quiroga	Ford
4	Puebla	Rafael Martínez	Jorge Goeters	Carlos Pardo †^{3}	Ford
5	Quéretaro	Jorge Goeters	Rafael Martínez	Hugo Oliveras	Toyota
6	Guadalajara	Germán Quiroga	Homero Richards	Homero Richards	Toyota
7	Zacatecas	Rubén Rovelo	Antonio Pérez	Antonio Pérez	Chevrolet
8	San Luis Potosí	Hugo Oliveras	Jorge Goeters	Jorge Goeters	Toyota
9	Puebla	Germán Quiroga^{4}	Patrick Goeters	Patrick Goeters	Toyota
10	Monterrey	Jorge Goeters	Antonio Pérez	Germán Quiroga	Ford
11	Querétaro	Rubén Rovelo	Rubén Rovelo	Rubén Rovelo	Chevrolet
12	Mexico City	Rafael Martínez	Antonio Pérez	Rogelio López	Ford
13	Chiapas	Rogelio López	Homero Richards	Homero Richards	Toyota
14	Aguascalientes	Rubén Rovelo	Rafael Martínez	Rogelio López	Ford

1Qualifying cancelled by rain.
2Qualifying cancelled by rain.
3Posthumous victory.
4Qualifying cancelled by rain.

=== Standings ===
(key) Bold - Pole position awarded by time. Italics - Pole position set by final practice results or rainout. * – Most laps led.

Rank	Driver	AGS	TXG	SLP	PUE	QRO	GDL	ZAC	SL2	PU2	MTY	QR2	MXC	TX2	AG2	Points
1	Germán Quiroga	1*	**2***	**1***	4	9	**2**	3	3	**4**	1	2	11	21	2	2273
2	Rogelio López	18	1	12	11	10	8	11	5	5	26	3	1	**11**	1	1997
3	Jorge Goeters	11	7	26	2*	**25**	25	2	1*	2	**11**	5	9	8	5	1992
4	Rafael Martínez	21	4	17	**3**	4*	15	12	18	3	18	9	**10**	3	3*	1972
5	Homero Richards	13	17	4	16	6	1*	4	4	30	6	6	30	1*	10	1946
6	Rubén Pardo	2	12	8	6	2	7	9	8	10	3	25	29	6	15	1946
7	Rubén Rovelo	**17**	5	2	5	15	6	**14**	23	8	25	**1***	8	22	**4**	1929
8	Hugo Oliveras	22	10	29	29	1	12	7	**12**	9	10	10	2	5	8	1836
9	Patrick Goeters	7	15	22	28	29	5	18	25	1*	4	4	14	10	6	1788
10	Carlos Peralta	3	6	9	23	26	10	5	9	28	7	11	7	19	25	1764
11	Carlos Contreras	10	14	11	14	11	14	23	17	7	9	18	13	7	12	1758
12	Abraham Calderón	14	20	14	9	12	29	15	19	16	8	7	5	9	9	1744
13	Irwin Vences	5	21	21	10	8	9	25	11	24	2	24	6	13	24	1709
14	Jorge Arteaga	23	24	23	22	3	4	8	14	11	5	23	28	4	14	1703
15	José Luis Ramírez	8	19	3	27	14	13	19	6	17	13	13	24	2	30	1700
16	Antonio Pérez	25	9	7	18	5	3	1*	7	6	14*	16	16*			1678
17	Freddy Tame, Jr.	4	8	6	12	16	19	22	2	33	21	8	17		18	1604
18	Pepe Montaño	19	13	20	13	28	17	21	21	23	17	12	15	14	11	1555
19	Carlos Anaya	24	11	13	19	22	11	13	16	26	16	29	21	12	21	1520
20	Oscar Peralta	20	21	10	26	13	21	24	13	13	29	15	18		17	1397
21	Victor Barrales	12	16	15	24	27	18	26	24	29	20	19	26	15	27	1388
22	Rafael Vallina	15	23	24	30	30	23	27	22	21	12	17	12	20	31	1361
23	Alejandro Capin **(R)**			28	20	19	24	16	20	15	19	27	4	23	7	1303
24	Elliot VanRankin **(R)**			18	15	20	26	20	15	32	15	22	25	18	20	1218
25	Fernando Plata	27		27	31	17	22	17	27	27	28	14	32	17	19	1209
26	Luis Felipe Montaño			19	8	7	16	6	10	12				24	29	1097
27	Israel Jaitovich			25	21	21	28	10	28	22	22	30	DNQ	26	26	1017
28	Julían Islas **(R)**			30	25	31	20	26	25		23	21	DNQ	25	22	886
29	Ricardo Pérez de Lara	6			7	18				18			19	27	13	831
30	Carlos Pardo	9	3	5	1											648
31	Juan Carlos Herrero **(R)**	16	18	16	17	24	30									615
32	Daniel Suárez **(R)**										14	20	20		28	406
33	Mike Sánchez	26										26	23		16	379
34	Jorge Seeman					23								16	23	303
35	Stan Culpepper **(R)**									19			27			188
36	Alan Williams **(R)**											28	22		DNS	303
37	Pepe González												2			170
38	Roberto Fernández						27			31						152
39	Pepe Rivera									14						103
40	Héctor A. Sánchez										24		DNQ			91
41	César Tiberio Jiménez										27					82
42	Rodrigo Marbán **(R)**							28								79
43	Oscar Ruíz												31			70
Rank	Driver	AGS	TXG	SLP	PUE	QRO	GDL	ZAC	SL2	PU2	MTY	QR2	MXC	TX2	AG2	Points
	References															

=== Rookie of the Year ===
Only the best 10 results count in the final classification.

Rank	Driver	AGS	TXG	SLP	PUE	QRO	GDL	ZAC	SL2	PU2	MTY	QR2	MXC	TX2	AG2	Points
1	Alejando Capín			28	20	19	24	16	20	15	19	27	4	23	7	90
2	Elliot VanRankin			18	15	20	26	20	15	32	15	22	25	18	20	82
3	Julían Islas			30	25	31	20	26	25		23	21	DNQ	25	22	77
4	Juan Carlos Herrero	16	18	16	17	24	30									54
5	Daniel Suárez										14	20	20		28	36
6	Stan Culpepper									19			27			14
7	Alan Williams											28	22		DNS	14
8	Rodrigo Marbán							28								7
Rank	Driver	AGS	TXG	SLP	PUE	QRO	GDL	ZAC	SL2	PU2	MTY	QR2	MXC	TX2	AG2	Points

== See also ==
- 2009 NASCAR Sprint Cup Series
- 2009 NASCAR Nationwide Series
- 2009 NASCAR Camping World Truck Series
- 2009 NASCAR Camping World East Series
- 2009 NASCAR Camping World West Series
- 2009 ARCA Re/Max Series
- 2009 NASCAR Whelen Modified Tour
- 2009 NASCAR Whelen Southern Modified Tour
- 2009 NASCAR Canadian Tire Series
- 2009 NASCAR Mini Stock Series
