= 2018 NASCAR PEAK Mexico Series =

The 2018 NASCAR PEAK Mexico Series was the eleventh season of the NASCAR PEAK Mexico Series and the fourteenth season organized by NASCAR Mexico. It began with the Gran Premio Difrenosa at Autódromo Monterrey on 25 March and concluded with the Gran Premio FedEx at Autódromo Hermanos Rodríguez on 2 December. Abraham Calderón entered the season as the defending Drivers' champion. Rubén García Jr. won the championship, nineteen points in front of Irwin Vences. And Fabián Welter was declared the Rookie of the Year.

== Drivers ==
No.	Manufacturer	Car Owner	Race Driver	Crew Chief
00	Toyota	Patricia Marbán	Rodrigo Marbán 4	Alfredo Montiel
0	Toyota	Rafael Vallina	Rafael Vallina 1	Juan Salazar
1	Toyota	Daniel Morales	Luis Michael Dörrbecker 2	Jorge Torres
2	Toyota	Jimmy Morales	Abraham Calderón	Alejandro Vega
3	Toyota	Sara Morales	Fabián Welter (R) 11	Xristos Pappas
3	Toyota	Sara Morales	Jorge Goeters 1	Xristos Pappas
4	Toyota	Xenia Alexis Morales	Rodrigo Rejón 1	Miguel Guzmán
4	Toyota	Xenia Alexis Morales	Piero Rodarte 1	Miguel Guzmán
6	Toyota	Priscila Palazuelos	Rogelio López	Juan Tapia
07	Toyota	Héctor Félix	Héctor Félix 3	Óscar Torres
7	Toyota	Antonio Camacho	Carlos Peralta 4	Carlos Valencia 1 Antonio Camacho 11
7	Toyota	Antonio Camacho	Elliot Van Rankin 8	Carlos Valencia 1 Antonio Camacho 11
08	Ford	José Luis Ramírez	José Luis Ramírez	Juan Luis Quintanar
8	Toyota	David Tame	Enrique Baca 8	Juan Salazar 2 Gregorio Loza 7
8	Toyota	David Tame	Rafael Martínez 1	Juan Salazar 2 Gregorio Loza 7
11	Dodge	Juan Salazar	Hugo Oliveras	Luis Ruíz
13	Toyota	Oscar Rodríguez	Alex González 1	Federico Cedillo
15	Dodge	Luis Ruíz	Rubén Pardo	Francisco Guzmán
16	Toyota	Miguel Sánchez	Mike Sánchez 6	Sergio Zúñiga
16	Toyota	Miguel Sánchez	Alex González 3	Sergio Zúñiga
19	Toyota	Ramíro Fidalgo	Héctor Aguirre	Cuauhtémoc González
20	Toyota	Homero Richards	Homero Richards	Luis Angel Avelar
24	Toyota	Pepe González	Pepe González 3	Pablo Gutiérrez
25	Ford	Martha Teresa Chavez	Abraham Jurado 1	Cristobal García
26	Dodge	Estefanía Oliveras	Santiago Tovar	Emanuel Moreno
28	Toyota	Lilian Castellano	Rubén Rovelo	Leonel Morales
30	Toyota	Carlos Marbán	Víctor Barrales 8	Juan Cervantes 6 Unknown 2 Rafaél Hernández 1
30	Toyota	Carlos Marbán	Víctor Barrales Jr. 1	Juan Cervantes 6 Unknown 2 Rafaél Hernández 1
31	Ford 5 Toyota 7	Franco Zanella 1 Paola Cardona 11	Jorge Goeters 11	Unknown 3 Juan Manuel Hernández 2 Jorge Gerardo González 7
31	Ford 5 Toyota 7	Franco Zanella 1 Paola Cardona 11	Patrick Goeters 1	Unknown 3 Juan Manuel Hernández 2 Jorge Gerardo González 7
37	Toyota	Pepe González	Max González	Jorge Castorena
40	Toyota	Michel Jourdain Jr.	Michel Jourdain Jr.	Luis Carlos Machorro
41	Toyota	Rafael Vallina	Patrick Goeters 3	Daniel Garrido 1
41	Toyota	Rafael Vallina	Patrick Goeters 3	Unknown 2
46	Toyota	Jordi Vidal	Irwin Vences	Jorge Eduardo García
48	Toyota	Salvador de Alba Jr.	Salvador de Alba Jr.	Randy Cardenas
54	Toyota	Miguel Jurado	Omar Jurado 2	Arturo Sánchez 1
54	Toyota	Miguel Jurado	Omar Jurado 2	Marcos García 1
55	Ford	Gerardo Rejón	Julio Rejón 1	Humberto Castilla
65	Toyota	Isaac Aragón	Alex González 5	Pablo Gutiérrez
68	Toyota	Horacio Richards	Manolín Gutiérrez	Mauricio Quintanar
77	Toyota	Anapaula Villegas	Xavi Razo	Fernando Huerta
88	Toyota	Juan Pablo García	Rubén García Jr.	Martín Bautista
90	Ford	Alberto Tame	Piero Rodarte 3	Edgar Romano
90	Ford	Alberto Tame	Rafael Martínez 7	Edgar Romano
96	Toyota	Javier Fernández	Javier Fernández 2	Valentín Fernández 1
96	Toyota	Javier Fernández	Javier Fernández 2	Juan Manuel Hernández 1

== Schedule ==
On 25 January 2018, NASCAR announced the 2018 schedule. León and Pachuca were dropped from the schedule in favor of El Dorado and a road course race at Aguascalientes. The race in El Marqués was held on the road course instead of the oval.

No.	Race title	Track	Date
1	Gran Premio Difrenosa	(Nuevo León) Autódromo Monterrey, Apodaca	25 March
2	Gran Premio Canel's	(San Luis Potosí) Autódromo Potosino, Zaragoza	22 April
3	Gran Premio Frontera	(Chihuahua (state)) El Dorado Speedway, Juan Aldama	20 May
4	Gran Premio Sam's Club	(Jalisco) Trióvalo Internacional de Cajititlán, Guadalajara	10 June
5	Gran Premio Red Cola	Autódromo Miguel E. Abed, Puebla	8 July
6	Gran Premio BLU Smartphones	Autódromo Internacional de Aguascalientes, Aguascalientes	29 July
7	Gran Premio Monster Energy	(Querétaro) Autódromo del Ecocentro de la Unión Ganadera, El Marqués	19 August
8	Gran Premio Red Cola	Autódromo Miguel E. Abed, Puebla	9 September
9	Gran Premio ARRIS	Súper Óvalo Chiapas, Tuxtla Gutiérrez	30 September
10	Gran Premio Baoli	Autódromo Internacional de Aguascalientes, Aguascalientes	21 October
11	Gran Premio Scotiabank	(Jalisco) Trióvalo Internacional de Cajititlán, Guadalajara	11 November
12	Gran Premio FedEx	Autódromo Hermanos Rodríguez, Mexico City	2 December

Oval
Road Course

== Results and standings ==
=== Races ===
No.	Race	Pole position	Most laps led	Winning driver	Manufacturer
1	Gran Premio Difrenosa	Salvador de Alba Jr.	Salvador de Alba Jr.	Homero Richards	Toyota
2	Gran Premio Canel's	Salvador de Alba Jr.	Irwin Vences	Irwin Vences	Toyota
3	Gran Premio Frontera	Rubén García Jr.	Rubén García Jr.	Rubén Rovelo	Toyota
4	Gran Premio Sam's Club	Rubén Rovelo	Irwin Vences	Irwin Vences	Toyota
5	Gran Premio Red Cola	Hugo Oliveras	Hugo Oliveras	Rubén García Jr.	Toyota
6	Gran Premio BLU Smartphones	Rubén García Jr.	Rubén García Jr.	Rubén García Jr.	Toyota
7	Gran Premio Monster Energy	Hugo Oliveras	Hugo Oliveras	Rubén García Jr.	Toyota
8	Gran Premio Red Cola	Santiago Tovar	Rubén Rovelo	Rubén Rovelo	Toyota
9	Gran Premio ARRIS	Rubén García Jr.	Irwin Vences	Irwin Vences	Toyota
10	Gran Premio Baoli	Salvador de Alba Jr.	Salvador de Alba Jr.	Abraham Calderón	Toyota
11	Gran Premio Scotiabank	Salvador de Alba Jr.	Abraham Calderón	Salvador de Alba Jr.	Toyota
12	Gran Premio FedEx	Abraham Calderón	Abraham Calderón	Abraham Calderón	Toyota

=== Drivers' championship ===
(key) Bold – Pole position awarded by time. Italics – Pole position set by final practice results or Owners' points. * – Most laps led.

Pos.	Driver	MTY	SLP	CHI	GDL	PUE	AGS	QRO	PUE	TXG	AGS	GDL	MXC	Points
1	Rubén García Jr.	7	8	**7***	3	1	**1***	1	9	**7**	2	2	8	488
2	Irwin Vences	2	1*	27	1*	6	4	6	2	1*	3	17	4	469
3	Rubén Rovelo	4	19	1	**5**	7	16	7	1*	2	4	4	12	459
4	Hugo Oliveras	10	10	10	2	**2***	12	**2***	4	11	8	8	16	439
5	Abraham Calderón	18	2	3	16	22	3	9	3	16	1	12*	**1***	435
6	Salvador de Alba Jr.	**13***	**4**	9	23	11	24	4	8	3	**16***	**1**	2	419
7	Santiago Tovar	9	7	6	14	5	8	21	**5**	12	9	9	6	419
8	Manolín Gutiérrez	11	11	18	9	4	13	11	7	20	10	7	7	400
9	Xavi Razo	20	3	4	21	8	7	10	17	4	22	3	3	393
10	Rubén Pardo	8	6	15	18	9	21	19	11	6	11	6	11	387
11	Héctor Aguirre	5	22	2	13	10	2	17	20	22	6	11	20	378
12	Rogelio López	19	13	14	11	16	6	18	10	8	5	14	15	379
13	Jorge Goeters	12	18	16	15	13	10	8	6	5	15	21	13	376
14	Homero Richards	1	16	19	6	14	22	3	21	23	12	5	22	368
15	Michel Jourdain Jr.	3	23	25	12	3	20	14	18	10	17	15	5	363
16	José Luis Ramírez	22	14	13	7	12	9	20	12	17	7	24	18	354
17	Fabián Welter **(R)**	17	17	31	10	23	17	5	22	14	14	19		295
18	Max González	23	15	29	19	20	14	22	15	24	21	13	19	294
19	Elliot Van Rankin		5	11	4		5		13	9	13	10		267
20	Enrique Baca		9	5	8	Wth	18		14	QL^{4}		18	10	226
21	Alex González	15	20	Wth	17	19	15	23	19				21	203
22	Rafael Martínez				22	17	15		19	21	18	22	23	197
23	Víctor Barrales	21	21	20		21	23	QL^{2}	16		20		14	172
24	Mike Sánchez	16	24	21	20	18	19							146
25	Carlos Peralta	6				15		12					9	134
26	Piero Rodarte	14	12	8						25				117
27	Patrick Goeters			32			11	16					17	100
28	Héctor Félix										19	16	25	72
29	Pepe González							DNS^{3}				20	24	44
Drivers ineligible for PEAK Mexico Series points
	Julio Rejón			12										
	Luis Michael Dörrbecker			23						13				
	Víctor Barrales Jr.							13						
	Rodrigo Marbán		25	24				23		15				
	Omar Jurado			17								23		
	Javier Fernández			26						18				
	Rafael Vallina			22										
	Rodrigo Rejón			28										
	Abraham Jurado			30										
Pos.	Driver	MTY	SLP	CHI	GDL	PUE	AGS	QRO	PUE	TXG	AGS	GDL	MXC	Points

Notes
They receive championship points in supporter series.

- ^{2} – Víctor Barrales qualified in the No. 30 for Víctor Barrales Jr.
- ^{3} – Pepe González received championship points, despite the fact that he did not start the race.
- ^{4} – Enrique Baca qualified in the No. 8 for Rafael Martínez.

== See also ==
- 2018 Monster Energy NASCAR Cup Series
- 2018 NASCAR Xfinity Series
- 2018 NASCAR Camping World Truck Series
- 2018 NASCAR K&N Pro Series East
- 2018 NASCAR K&N Pro Series West
- 2018 NASCAR Whelen Modified Tour
- 2018 NASCAR Pinty's Series
- 2018 NASCAR Whelen Euro Series
