= 2011 NASCAR Corona Series =

Seasons
- ← 2010 2012 →

The 2011 NASCAR Corona Series was the eighth season of the Corona Series and was organized by NASCAR Mexico. The season was composed by fourteen races in seven venues across Mexico. The season started in Monterrey with the Regia 200, and finished in Mexico City in the Mexico Fest 200. Six drivers won races being Homero Richards the most winner with five. Mónica Morales won the owners championship for third time and Germán Quiroga successful defend his championship, winning his third championship. Enrique Contreras III won the Rookie of the Year title.

== Report ==
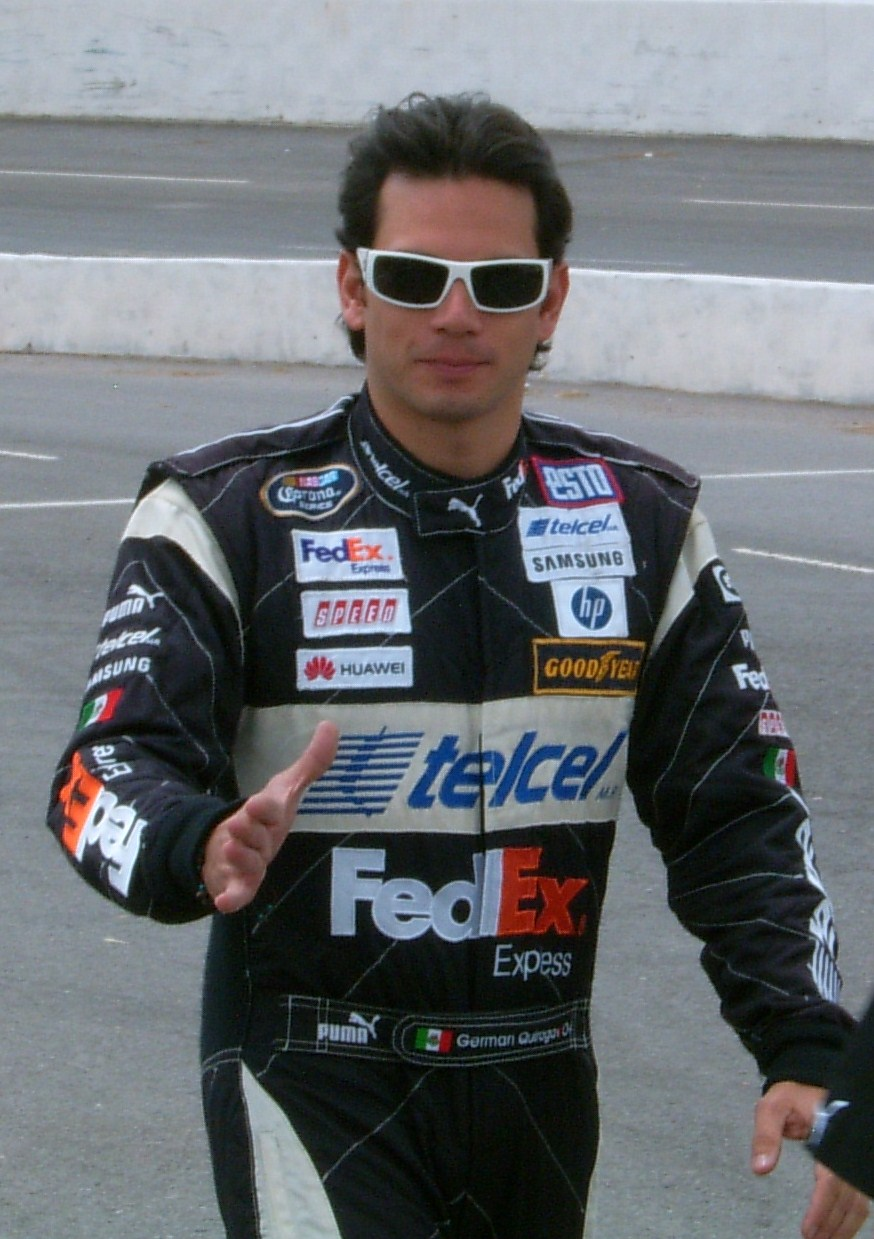
Germán Quiroga, 2011 champion

The kickoff of the season was in Monterrey. This was the 100th race of the NCS. Patrick Goeters dominated the race from start, and won his fourth race in his career. In the second race, Jorge Goeters won his 10th race, and the fourth in this track. Goeters together with Germán Quiroga shared the leading. The race was shortened by time, originally was scheduled to 250 laps (201 km). The third race in Aguascalientes saw to Rogelio López started from the back of the grid, because to failed the inspection after the qualification, but he took the victory. Germán Quiroga became in the leader of NCS. In Chiapas, Jorge Goeters took his first victory of the season in a race with 10 cautions. The race was shortened of 200 laps to 129 laps by time. Again Homero Richards took the first place in the fifth race. This was the first of fourth wins in a row that finished in San Luis Potosí.

In the second part of the season, Rafael Martínez won in his hometown. For Martínez was his 15th victory, he took the historic second place. But, soon Quiroga reached the 15th victory in the next race and two more before the end of the season. This last victory marked the third championship for Quiroga.

== Teams and drivers ==
Team	Manufacturer	No.	Race Driver	Rounds
2b Racing	Chevrolet	7	Carlos Peralta	All
2b Racing	Chevrolet	8	Freddy Tame, Jr.	1–7, 9–14
2b Racing	Chevrolet	10	Oscar Peralta	1–3, 5–8, 10, 11, 13
Anvi Motorsports	Toyota	30	Victor Barrales	1–6, 8–11, 13–14
Anvi Motorsports	Toyota	39	Juan Carlos Herrero	2–6, 9
CEDVA Racing	Dodge	55	Jorge Contreras, Jr.	1–3, 6, 8–11, 13, 14
Equipo Telcel	Dodge	2	Germán Quiroga	All
Equipo Telcel	Dodge	3	Daniel Suárez	All
Escuderia Telmex	Chevrolet	1	Antonio Pérez	All
Escuderia Telmex	Chevrolet	5	Rubén Rovelo	All
FCV Racing	Toyota	14	Carlos Contreras	All
FCV Racing	Toyota	49	Jorge Arteaga	1–12, 14
HDI Seguros Racing Team	Mazda	27	Ruben García Novoa	1–11
HDI Seguros Racing Team	Mazda	27	Rubén García, Jr.	13–14
HDI Seguros Racing Team	Mazda	88	Alejandro Capin	All
H&HighSpeed	Dodge	20	Homero Richards	All
HO Speed Racing	Toyota	11	Hugo Oliveras	All
HO Speed Racing	Toyota	15	Rubén Pardo	All
HO Speed Racing	Toyota	48	Rogelio López	All
Ramírez Racing Team	Chevrolet	08	José Luis Ramírez	All
SC Racing	Chevrolet	03	Patrick Goeters	All
SC Racing	Chevrolet	04	Javier Razo	1–4
SC Racing	Chevrolet	05	Abraham Calderón	All
SC Racing	Chevrolet	70	Estefania Reyes	1–6
SpartacRT	Chevrolet	0	Rafael Vallina	All
Tame Racing	Ford	13	Elliot Van Rankin	All
Tame Racing	Ford	22	Irwin Vences	All
Tame Racing	Toyota	34	Oscar Ruiz	All
Team GP	Mazda	18	Rafael Martínez	All
Team GP	Mazda	31	Jorge Goeters	All

=== Driver changes ===
- Freddy Tame leave Team GP, and joined 2b Racing taking the place of Ricardo Pérez de Lara.

== 2011 calendar ==
The schedule was presented on March 8 with 14 races in 7 venues.

2011 venues

No.	Race Title	Track	Date	Time	
No.	Race Title	Track	Date	Local	UTC
1	Regia 200	(Nuevo León) Autódromo Monterrey, Apodaca	20 March	13:10	19:10
2	Potosina 200	(San Luis Potosí) Autódromo Potosino, Zaragoza	3 April	13:10	18:10
3	Aguascalientes 240	Autódromo Internacional de Aguascalientes, Aguascalientes	1 May	13:10	18:10
4	AC Delco 240	Autódromo Chiapas, Tuxtla Gutiérrez	15 May	13:10	18:10
5	Queretana 200	Autódromo Querétaro, El Marqués	5 June	13:10	18:10
6	Puebla 240	Autódromo Miguel E. Abed, Puebla	19 June	13:10	18:10
7	Mexico Fest 200	Autódromo Hermanos Rodríguez, Mexico City	17 July	13:10	18:10
8	Potosina 200	(San Luis Potosí) Autódromo Potosino, Zaragoza	7 August	13:10	18:10
9	Regia 200	(Nuevo León) Autódromo Monterrey, Apodaca	21 August	13:10	18:10
10	Queretana 200	Autódromo Querétaro, El Marqués	4 September	13:10	18:10
11	Puebla 240	(Puebla) Autódromo Miguel E. Abed, Amozoc	2 October	13:10	18:10
12	Potosina 200	(San Luis Potosí) Autódromo Potosino, Zaragoza	23 October	13:10	18:10
13	Aguascalientes 240	Autódromo Internacional de Aguascalientes, Aguascalientes	6 November	13:10	19:10
14	Mexico Fest 200	Autódromo Hermanos Rodríguez, Mexico City	27 November	13:15	19:15

Oval
Road Course

=== Calendar changes ===
- Guadalajara was exclude for the season because the damage in the track of the Trióvalo Bernardo Obregón.
- The second race in Chiapas was changed to San Luis Potosí, because of damage in the track.

== Results and standings ==
=== Races ===
No.	Race	Pole position	Most lap led	Winning driver	Winning manufacturer
1	Regia 200	Patrick Goeters	Patrick Goeters	Patrick Goeters	Chevrolet
2	Potosina 200	Germán Quiroga	Homero Richards	Jorge Goeters	Mazda
3	Aguascalientes 240	Jorge Goeters	Antonio Pérez	Rogelio López	Toyota
4	AC Delco 240	Jorge Goeters	Antonio Pérez	Jorge Goeters	Mazda
5	Queretana 200	Rafael Martínez	Homero Richards	Homero Richards	Toyota
6	Puebla 240	Homero Richards	Homero Richards	Homero Richards	Toyota
7	Mexico Fest 200	Rogelio López	Patrick Goeters	Homero Richards	Toyota
8	Potosina 200	Germán Quiroga	Germán Quiroga	Homero Richards	Toyota
9	Regia 200	Daniel Suárez	Homero Richards	Rafael Martínez	Mazda
10	Queretana 200	Jorge Goeters	Jorge Goeters	Germán Quiroga	Dodge
11	Puebla 240	Alejandro Capín	Alejandro Capín	Rogelio López	Toyota
12	Potosina 200	Patrick Goeters	Rafael Martínez	Germán Quiroga	Dodge
13	Aguascalientes 240	Daniel Suárez	Patrick Goeters	Germán Quiroga	Dodge
14	Mexico Fest 200	Daniel Suárez	Homero Richards	Homero Richards	Toyota

=== Driver standings ===
(key) Bold - Pole position awarded by time. Italics - Pole position set by final practice results or rainout. * – Most laps led.

Rank	Driver	MTY	SLP	AGS	TXG	QRO	PUE	MXC	SL2	MT2	QR2	PU2	SL3	AG2	MX2	Points
1	Germán Quiroga	2	**4**	2	9	12	2	3	**2***	2	1	17	1	1	5	2272
2	Homero Richards	9	6*	29	23	1*	**1***	1	1	8*	2	31	17	28	1*	1986
3	Jorge Goeters	5	1	**27**	**1**	24	3	7	6	10	**15***	7	2	35	12	1942
4	Rubén Rovelo	3	3	25	3	8	9	8	5	3	9	25	32	7	4	1924
5	José Luis Ramírez	18	16	5	6	9	15	6	9	21	12	10	8	4	8	1893
6	Rogelio López	28	7	1	22	22	27	**5**	8	5	6	1	19	9	3	1885
7	Rafael Martínez	8	2	14	10	**2**	19	11	33	1	7	3	16*	34	9	1867
8	Patrick Goeters	**1***	8	33	29	32	12	4*	14	26	4	2	**6**	2*	14	1818
9	Daniel Suárez	12	19	10	25	6	34	15	7	**4**	3	19	4	**29**	**7**	1769
10	Abraham Calderón	7	22	6	28	5	6	9	30	20	5	4	31	19	2	1752
11	Hugo Oliveras	6	5	3	26	13	32	23	10	29	20	9	7	8	11	1724
12	Carlos Peralta	14	11	11	4	11	10	18	11	12	19	14	25	6	35	1699
13	Antonio Pérez	22	14	31*	14*	33	11	12	3	7	28	12	5	3	30	1670
14	Rubén Pardo	10	21	4	17	18	31	16	21	31	8	18	15	13	6	1616
15	Irwin Vences	29	17	7	33	4	4	10	27	32	32	6	3	24	13	1613
16	Elliot VanRankin	24	9	12	13	7	8	19	34	14	29	11	24	16	10	1611
17	Óscar Ruiz	34	13	8	21	27	14	13	16	22	10	8	29	5	36	1528
18	Alejandro Capin	26	12	9	7	3	20	20	4	30	11	**5***	30	11	24	1524
19	Pepe Montaño	11	20	30	20	15	18	35	19	11	14	33	12	10	16	1494
20	Carlos Contreras	4	10	34	18	17	13	2^{4}	22	28	24	26	10	27	29	1492
21	Luis Felipe Montaño	19	33	19	5	31	5^{3}	21	31	13	13	30	21	12	17	1431
22	Freddy Tame, Jr.	31	26	15	16	16	17	17		6	21	23	9	18	34	1382
23	Jorge Arteaga	13	15	24	24	10	24	14	12	27	31	24	23		32	1358
24	Enrique Contreras III **(R)**		28	18	12	20	26	27	20	15	23	27	11	30	28	1330
25	Héctor Félix **(R)**	33	23	26	15	23	28	32	DNQ^{5}		DNQ^{5}	20	26	15	22	1238
26	Victor Barrales	15	29	28	31	DNQ^{5}	21		15	16	22	22		25	21	1220
27	Rubén García Novoa	23	18	17	2	28	7	25	29	9	17	29				1215
28	Israel Jaitovich			21	DNQ^{5}	19	DNQ^{5}	34	23	18		15	18	21	26	1065
29	Rafael Vallina	20	30	13	27	21	22	30	18	19	26			26		1040
30	Rodrigo Marbán **(R)**	27	25	DNQ^{5}	19	30	DNQ^{5}		28	23	25	22		DNQ^{5}	DNQ^{5}	961
31	Óscar Peralta	30	31	16		14	16	36	13		30	13		33		918
32	Jorge Contreras, Jr. **(R)**	21	DSQ^{1}	20			30		26	25	DNQ^{5}	28		32	18	881
33	Alex Villasana **(R)**		DNQ^{5}	DNQ^{5}			DNQ^{5}	26	DNQ^{5}		16	21	13	31	20	808
34	Pepe González								17	33	18	14		DNQ^{5}	23	695
35	Julián Islas		DNQ^{5}	32	11	DNQ^{5}	33		DNQ^{5}		DNQ^{5}	34	23			673
36	Mike Sánchez						23	24	25	24	DNQ^{5}	32		DNQ^{5}	33	660
37	Javier Fernández						25		24				28	DNQ^{5}	31	615
38	Alan Williams	32	34	DNQ^{5}	32	DNQ^{5}		31						14	DNQ^{5}	548
39	Hector Aguirre **(R)**								34		27	16	20	22	15	527
40	Carlos Anaya	16	DNQ^{5}	DNQ^{5}	DNQ^{5}	DNQ^{5}	29								DNQ^{5}	463
41	Rodrigo Peralta **(R)**											DNQ^{5}	27	20	19	428
42	Juan Carlos Herrero **(R)**		24	23	8	DSQ^{2}			DNQ^{5}							422
43	Estefanía Reyes	25	DNQ^{5}	22	30	26										398
44	Javier Razo **(R)**	17	27										DNQ^{5}	DNQ^{5}	27	380
45	Rubén García, Jr. **(R)**													17	25	200
46	Juan Carlos Blum **(R)**							29								76
47	Pepe Rivera, Jr.														DNQ^{5}	49
Rank	Driver	MTY	SLP	AGS	TXG	QRO	PUE	MXC	SL2	MT2	QR2	PU2	SL3	AG2	MX2	Points
	References															

Jorge Contreras, Jr. had finished in 32, but he was disqualified after the technical inspection.
Herrero had finished in 29, but he was disqualified, because he did not present his carburetor to inspection.
Montaño got a penalty of 50 points for an engine irregularity.
Carlos Contreras got a penalty of 15 points for an steering wheel irregularity.
All drivers that did not qualify for the race received championship points.

=== Rookie of the Year ===
Only the best 10 results count in the final classification.

Rank	Driver	MTY	SLP	AGS	TXG	QRO	PUE	MXC	SL2	MT2	QR2	PU2	SL3	AG2	MX2	Points
1	Enrique Contreras III		28	18	12	20	26	27	20	15	23	27	11	30	28	93
2	Héctor Félix	33	23	26	15	23	28	32	DNQ		DNQ	20	26	15	22	84
3	Alex Villasana		DNQ	DNQ			DNQ	26	DNQ		16	21	13	31	20	69
4	Jorge Contreras, Jr.	21	DSQ	20			30		26	25	DNQ	28		32	18	68
5	Rodrigo Marbán	27	25	DNQ	19	30	DNQ		28	23	25	22		DNQ	DNQ	65
6	Hector Aguirre								34		27	16	20	22	15	48
7	Javier Fernández						25		24				28	DNQ	31	46
8	Rodrigo Peralta											DNQ	27	20	19	35
9	Juan Carlos Herrero		24	23	8	DSQ			DNQ							32
10	Javier Razo	17	27										DNQ	DNQ	27	26
11	Rubén García, Jr.													17	25	14
12	Juan Carlos Blum							29								7
Rank	Driver	MTY	SLP	AGS	TXG	QRO	PUE	MXC	SL2	MT2	QR2	PU2	SL3	AG2	MX2	Points

== See also ==
- 2011 NASCAR Sprint Cup Series
- 2011 NASCAR Nationwide Series
- 2011 NASCAR Camping World Truck Series
- 2011 ARCA Racing Series
- 2011 NASCAR Whelen Modified Tour
- 2011 NASCAR Whelen Southern Modified Tour
- 2011 NASCAR Canadian Tire Series
- 2011 NASCAR Stock V6 Series
