= 2004 Desafío Corona season =

The 2004 Desafio Corona season was the first season of stock car racing in Mexico. The serial was presented in March as Desafío Corona. After 14 races Carlos Pardo of Equipo Telcel was declared champion.

== Cars ==
Pontiac Grand Am was the car used for almost drivers. Only two Dodge Stratus, both of Seeman-Baker team, was used. Pontiac won 13 of 14 runs and the championship.

== Teams and drivers ==
=== Full time entries ===
Team	Manufacturer	No.	Race Driver	Rounds
Escudería Telmex	Pontiac	1	Mara Reyes	All
Escudería Telmex	Pontiac	2	Rubén Pardo	All
Escudería Telcel Sun Motorola	Pontiac	5	Rogelio López	All
Escudería Telcel Sun Motorola	Pontiac	6	Carlos Pardo	All
Escudería Seman Baker	Pontiac	38	Jorge Seman	1, 3, 6, 9, 10, 12–14
Escudería Seman Baker	Dodge	83	Germán Quiroga	All
Escudería Seman Baker	Dodge	87	Luis Felipe Montaño	All
Escudería Díaz Racing	Pontiac	11	Carlos Contreras	4–14
Escudería Díaz Racing	Pontiac	22	César Pedrero	1–3
Escudería Díaz Racing	Pontiac	22	Jonathan Manatou	8–9
Escudería Díaz Racing	Pontiac	22	Eduardo Troconis	10–12, 14
Escudería Hecsal Racing	Pontiac	7	Héctor Sánchez	All
Raam Racing Team	Pontiac	43	Óscar Ruíz	All
Team GP	Pontiac	17	Jorge Goeters	1–13
Team GP	Pontiac	18	Fernando Plata	All

=== Part time entries ===
Team	Manufacturer	No.	Race Driver	Rounds
Bracho Racing Team	Pontiac	12	Julio Bracho Jr.	1–4, 6, 8, 14
Dynamic Motorsport	Pontiac	11	Carlos Contreras	1–3
Escudería Delphi	Pontiac	9	Sebastián Ocaranza	1–2, 4–8
Escudería Delphi	Pontiac	9	Héctor Rached	3, 14
Escudería Delphi	Pontiac	9	Horacio Topete	9–10, 12
Escudería México	Pontiac	3	Gianfranco Cané	1–5
Escudería Zeppelin	Pontiac	44	César Tiberio Jiménez	1–10
PPG Motorsports	Pontiac	24	José González	14
Racing Toys	Pontiac	66	Jonathan Manatou	1
Racing Toys	Pontiac	66	Héctor Rached	2
Tiger Team	Pontiac	99	Marcelo Núñez	1–4

== Schedule ==
2004 Desafío Corona venues

No.	Race Title	Track	Date	Time	
No.	Race Title	Track	Date	Local	UTC
1	Mexico City	Autódromo Hermanos Rodríguez, Mexico City	June 6	13:30	18:30
2	Guadalajara	(Jalisco) Trióvalo Bernardo Obregón, Guadalajara	June 27	13:30	18:30
3	Querétaro	Autódromo Querétaro, El Marqués	July 18	13:30	18:30
4	Monterrey	(Nuevo León) Autódromo Monterrey, Apodaca	August 1	13:30	18:30
5	Torreón	(Durango) Autódromo Marco Magaña, Gómez Palacio	August 8	13:30	18:30
6	San Luis Potosí	Autódromo San Luis 400, San Luis Potosí	August 22	13:30	18:30
7	Zacatecas	Autódromo Internacional de Zacatecas, Guadalupe	September 5	13:30	18:30
8	León	(Guanajuato) Autódromo de León, León	September 19	13:33	18:33
9	Guadalajara	(Jalisco) Trióvalo Bernardo Obregón, Guadalajara	October 3		
10	Querétaro	Autódromo Querétaro, El Marqués	October 17		
11	León	(Guanajuato) Autódromo de León, León	October 31		
12	Guadalajara	(Jalisco) Trióvalo Bernardo Obregón, Guadalajara	November 14	13:33	19:33
13	San Luis Potosí	Autódromo San Luis 400, San Luis Potosí	November 28	13:33	19:33
14	Mexico City	Autódromo Hermanos Rodríguez, Mexico City	December 5	13:33	19:33

Oval/Speedway
Road Course/Street Circuit

== Results ==
=== Races ===
No.	Race	Pole position	Most laps led	Winning driver	Winning manufacturer
1	Mexico City	(Mexico) Mara Reyes	(Mexico) Jorge Goeters	(Mexico) Jorge Goeters	(United States) Pontiac
2	(Jalisco) Guadalajara	(Mexico) Patrick Goeters	(Mexico) Carlos Pardo	(Mexico) Carlos Contreras	(United States) Pontiac
3	(Querétaro) Quéretaro	(Mexico) Germán Quiroga	(Mexico) Rubén Pardo	(Mexico) Carlos Contreras	(United States) Pontiac
4	(Nuevo León) Monterrey	(Mexico) Gianfranco Cané	(Mexico) Rogelio López	(Mexico) César Tiberio Jiménez	(United States) Pontiac
5	(Durango) Torreón	(Mexico) Rubén Pardo	(Mexico) Carlos Pardo	(Mexico) Carlos Pardo	(United States) Pontiac
6	San Luis Potosí	(Mexico) Carlos Pardo^{1}	(Mexico) Jorge Goeters	(Mexico) Germán Quiroga	(United States) Dodge
7	Zacatecas	(Mexico) Carlos Contreras	(Mexico) Carlos Pardo	(Mexico) Carlos Pardo	(United States) Pontiac
8	(Guanajuato) León	(Mexico) Fernando Plata	(Mexico) Carlos Pardo	(Mexico) Carlos Pardo	(United States) Pontiac
9	(Jalisco) Guadalajara	(Mexico) Jorge Goeters	(Mexico) Rogelio López	(Mexico) Rogelio López	(United States) Pontiac
10	(Querétaro) Quéretaro	(Mexico) Jorge Goeters	(Mexico) Rubén Pardo	(Mexico) Rubén Pardo	(United States) Pontiac
11	(Guanajuato) León	(Mexico) Carlos Pardo^{2}	(Mexico) Jorge Goeters	(Mexico) Rogelio López	(United States) Pontiac
12	(Jalisco) Guadalajara	(Mexico) Jorge Goeters	(Mexico) Jorge Goeters	(Mexico) Carlos Pardo	(United States) Pontiac
13	San Luis Potosí	(Mexico) Rubén Pardo	(Mexico) Jorge Goeters	(Mexico) Rogelio López	(United States) Pontiac
14	Mexico City	(Mexico) Sebastián Ocaranza	(Mexico) Rogelio López	(Mexico) Rogelio López	(United States) Pontiac

1. Qualifying cancelled by rain.
2. Qualifying cancelled by works in the track.

=== Standings ===
Rank	Driver	(Mexico City) MEX	(Jalisco) GDL	(Querétaro) QRO	(Nuevo León) MTY	(Durango) TOR	(San Luis Potosí) SLP	(Zacatecas) ZAC	(Guanajuato) LEON	(Jalisco) GDL	(Querétaro) QRO	(Guanajuato) LEON	(Jalisco) GDL	(San Luis Potosí) SLP	(Mexico City) MEX	Points
1	(Mexico) Carlos Pardo	5	14	3	2	1	7	1	1	2	2	15	1	3	4	2326
2	(Mexico) Rubén Pardo	9	18	2	3	3	4	3	6	4	1	2	5	6	3	2257
3	(Mexico) Rogelio López	7	3	23	15	4	9	2	11	1	3	1	6	1	1	2201
4	(Mexico) Jorge Goeters	1	6	6	4	19	2	18	2	11	4	4	2	2		2045
5	(Mexico) Fernando Plata	11	5	4	7	6	6	15	9	5	5	14	3	4	26	2026
6	(Mexico) Mara Reyes	10	4	10	18	8	11	5	17	3	6	7	4	8	23	1943
7	(Mexico) Carlos Contreras	13	1	1	6	2	5	13	22	13	7	21	24	5	21	1936
8	(Mexico) Oscar Ruíz	22	15	9	5	5	23	11	5	7	16	6	7	10	14	1887
9	(Mexico) Héctor Sánchez	6	8	20	19	11	13	9	8	10	11	8	9	11	7	1857
10	(Mexico) Luis F. Montaño	17	13	24	22	17	3	6	3	6	22	23	8	9	2	1815
11	(Mexico) Germán Quiroga	20	21	7	24	7	1	8	4	12	17	24	18	7	10	1802
12	(Mexico) Ignacio Alvarado	8	11	13	11	18	17	19	12	20	19	12	17	14	6	1705
13	(Mexico) Juan Lópezpape	25		16	8	14	12	10	16	23	14	5	20	15	13	1553
14	(Mexico) Alejandro Portillo	24		14	9	16	19	17	15	18	9	10	19	17	16	1525
15	(Mexico) Patrick Goeters	19	2	8		9	8	3		8	20	19		13	12	1483
16	(Mexico) César Tiberio Jiménez	18	17	5	1	15	22	7	10	9	8					1337
17	(Mexico) Sebastián Ocaranza	12	19		23	12	10	16	18	24	12	3	13		18	1213
18	(Mexico) Raúl García	14		25	17		16	21	20		18	16	11		25	1084
19	(Mexico) Jorge Seman	21		26			14	20			13		23	12	24	857
20	(Mexico) Julio Bracho, Jr.	16	16	19	14		15	13	13						5	854
21	(Mexico) Jesús Castellanos		12	21	12		18			19		20	14			799
22	(Mexico) Javier de la Parra					13		14	21	25		18	16		11	796
23	(Mexico) Gianfranco Cané	2	22	15	16	10										649
24	(Mexico) Miguel de la Parra			22	13		21	12		22						545
25	(Mexico) Marcelo Núñez ✝ (Note: The 26-year-old driver died on August 9, 2004, eight days after a racing accident at Autódromo Monterrey.)	3	9	12	20											533
26	(Mexico) Jonathan Manatou	15							14	16						499
27	(Mexico) Héctor Rached		20	17									10		9	492
28	(Mexico) Sebastián Ocaranza, Jr.											17	12		19	475
29	(Mexico) Eduardo Troconis										15	11	15		22	467
30	(Mexico) Eduardo Goeters	23	23									13		16		430
31	(Mexico) César Pedrero	4	10	11												429
32	(Mexico) Horacio Topete									14	21		22			318
33	(Mexico) Michael Goeters				10				7							280
34	(Mexico) Roberto Fernández									15			21		17	212
35	(Mexico) Eliseo Márquez			18									9			194
36	(Mexico) Iván Pérez		7													146
37	(Mexico) Jonathan Briseño										10				8	134
38	(Mexico) Horacio Richards														15	118
39	(Mexico) Ignacio Márquez	26							19							106
40	(Mexico) David Hernández						20									103
40	(Mexico) Alfredo Galland									17						103
40	(Mexico) Eduardo Calderón									21						103
40	(Mexico) José González														20	103
44	(Mexico) Rafael Vallina				21											100
44	(Mexico) Ricardo Marroquín											22				100
Rank	Driver	(Mexico City) MEX	(Jalisco) GDL	(Querétaro) QRO	(Nuevo León) MTY	(Durango) TOR	(San Luis Potosí) SLP	(Zacatecas) ZAC	(Guanajuato) LEON	(Jalisco) GDL	(Querétaro) QRO	(Guanajuato) LEON	(Jalisco) GDL	(San Luis Potosí) SLP	(Mexico City) MEX	Points
