= Nelson Canache Jr. =

Venezuelan racing driver

- Born: March 16, 1978 (age 48); Caracas, Venezuela

ARCA Menards Series career
- 20 races run over 2 years
- Best finish: 8th (2012)
- First race: 2012 Lucas Oil 200 (Daytona)
- Last race: 2013 Barbera's Autoland 150 (Milville)
Wins	Top tens	Poles
0	2	0
- Statistics up to date as of June 20, 2023.

Nelson Canache Jr. (born March 16, 1978) is a Venezuelan professional auto racing driver who has previously competed in the ARCA Racing Series, the American Le Mans Series, and the Rolex Grand Am Sports Car Series.

== Racing career ==
In 2012, Canache raced full time in the ARCA Racing Series for Venturini Motorsports, primarily driving the No. 35 Chevrolet/Toyota, although he drove the Nos. 15 and 66 so select events. He had two top-ten finishes, a seventh place at Chicagoland Speedway after starting third, and a tenth-place finish at the second Pocono Raceway on his way to finish eighth in the final points standings.

Can made a one-off return to the series the following year for Venturini at New Jersey Motorsports Park driving the No. 15 Toyota, where he finished eleventh after starting fifth. It was also during this year that he, alongside David Donohue, Shane Lewis, and Jim Norman won the 24 Hours of Daytona in the GX class for Napleton Racing.

== Motorsports results ==
=== NASCAR ===
(key) (Bold – Pole position awarded by qualifying time. Italics – Pole position earned by points standings or practice time. * – Most laps led.)

==== PEAK Mexico Series ====
NASCAR PEAK Mexico Series results
Year	Team	No.	Make	1	2	3	4	5	6	7	8	9	10	11	12	13	14	NPMSC	Pts	Ref
2012	SC Racing	01	Toyota	MTY	SLP	QRO	MXC	PUE	AGS	MXC	SLP	QRO	AGS	PUE	MTY	CHI; 28	MXC	43rd	16	
2017	Juan Carlos González	45	Toyota	MTY; 17	SLP	PUE	GDL	LEO	AGS	PAC	QRO	GDL	TUX	PUE	MXC			38th	0	

=== ARCA Racing Series ===
(key) (Bold – Pole position awarded by qualifying time. Italics – Pole position earned by points standings or practice time. * – Most laps led.)

ARCA Racing Series results
Year	Team	No.	Make	1	2	3	4	5	6	7	8	9	10	11	12	13	14	15	16	17	18	19	20	21	ARSC	Pts	Ref
2012	Venturini Motorsports	35	Toyota	DAY; 22			TAL; 27	TOL; 16	ELK; 16			WIN; 19			CHI; 7										8th	3660	
2012	Venturini Motorsports	35	Chevy		MOB; 22	SLM; 33				POC; 14	MCH; 32					IRP; 14			ISF; 23		SLM; 11	DSF; C			8th	3660	
2012	Venturini Motorsports	15	Ford										NJE; 12												8th	3660	
2012	Venturini Motorsports	66	Chevy											IOW; 30											8th	3660	
2012	Venturini Motorsports	66	Toyota														POC; 10	BLN; 12		MAD; 12			KAN; 12		8th	3660	
2013	Venturini Motorsports	15	Toyota	DAY	MOB	SLM	TAL	TOL	ELK	POC	MCH	ROA	WIN	CHI	NJE; 11	POC	BLN	ISF	MAD	DSF	IOW	SLM	KEN	KAN	106th	175	

==== 24 Hours of Daytona results ====
Year	Team	Co-drivers	Car	Class	Laps	Pos.	Class Pos.
2012	(United States) APR Motorsport	(United States) Ian Baas (United States) Jim Norman (Italy) Emanuele Pirro (South Africa) Dion von Moltke	Audi R8	GT	447	44th	31st
2013	(United States) Napleton Racing	(United States) David Donohue (United States) Shane Lewis (United States) Jim Norman	Porsche 997 GT3 Cup	GX	635	26th	**1st**
2014	(United States) Flying Lizard Motorsports	(United States) Tim Pappas (United States) Spencer Pumpelly (Germany) Markus Winkelhock	Audi R8 LMS	GTD	662	19th	**2nd**
2015	(United States) Park Place Motorsports	(France) Kévin Estre (United States) Patrick Lindsey (United States) Jim Norman (United States) Spencer Pumpelly	Porsche 911 GT America	GTD	644	35th	16th

=== Complete WeatherTech SportsCar Championship results ===
(key) (Races in bold indicate pole position; results in italics indicate fastest lap)

Year	Team	Class	Make	Engine	1	2	3	4	5	6	7	8	9	10	11	Pos.	Points	Ref
2014	Flying Lizard Motorsports	GTD	Audi R8 LMS ultra	Audi 5.2L V10 V10	DAY; 2	SEB; 8	LGA; 6	BEL; 14	WGL; 15	MOS; 10	IMS; 8	ELK; 7	VIR; 16	AUS; 7	ATL; 14	16th	232	
2015	Park Place Motorsports	GTD	Porsche 911 GT America	Porsche 4.0 L Flat-6	DAY; 16†	SEB	LGA	DET	WGL	LIM	ELK	VIR	COA	PET		56th	1	
