= NASCAR Mexico =

- Type: Private
- Industry: Motorsports
- Founded: 2005
- Headquarters: Mexico City, Mexico
- Key people: Brian France, NASCAR chairman Chad Little; Edgar Matute
- Products: Sporting activities
- Website: www.nascarmexico.com

NASCAR Mexico is a joint-venture between NASCAR and OCESA, a Mexican entertainment company, aiming to develop, manage and operate local motorsports events and oversee television distribution, sponsorship and licensing.

The venture attempts to create marketing programs to increase interest in local NASCAR events as well as NASCAR events in the United States that are televised in Mexico.

NASCAR Mexico had been responsible for the organization of The Chilango 150, a former NASCAR Nationwide Series race at the Autódromo Hermanos Rodríguez in Mexico City.

It also organizes and sanctions two racing series, the NASCAR Mexico Series and the NASCAR Challenge Mexico.

The series experienced its first fatality on June 14, 2009, when Carlos Pardo was killed in an accident on the final lap. Pardo was declared the winner of the same race he was killed in after he led the final completed lap.

== Champions ==
Season	Driver
2004	(Mexico) Carlos Pardo
2005	(Mexico) Jorge Goeters
2006	(Mexico) Rogelio López
2007	(Mexico) Rafael Martínez
2008	(Mexico) Antonio Pérez
2009	(Mexico) Germán Quiroga
2010	(Mexico) Germán Quiroga
2011	(Mexico) Germán Quiroga
2012	(Mexico) Jorge Goeters
2013	(Mexico) Rodrigo Peralta
2014	(Mexico) Abraham Calderón
2015	(Mexico) Ruben Garcia, Jr.
2017	(Mexico) Abraham Calderón
2018	(Mexico) Rubén García, Jr.
2019	(Mexico) Rubén García, Jr.
2020	(Mexico) Rubén Rovelo
2021	(Mexico) Salvador de Alba
2022	(Mexico) Rubén García, Jr.
2023	(Mexico) Salvador de Alba
2024	(Mexico) Rubén García, Jr.
2025	(Mexico) Alejandro de Alba Jr
