= 2019 NASCAR PEAK Mexico Series =

Auto racing series

The 2019 NASCAR PEAK Mexico Series was the twelfth season of the NASCAR PEAK Mexico Series and the fifteenth season organized by NASCAR Mexico. It bean with the Gran Premio ARRIS at Autódromo Monterrey on 31 March and concluded at Autódromo Hermanos Rodríguez on 1 December. Rubén García Jr. defended his Drivers' champion.

== Schedule ==
On 8 January 2019, NASCAR announced the 2019 schedule. The race in El Marqués and the second race in Aguascalientes will be held on the oval instead of the road course. On 16 January, it was announced that Monterrey, Guadalajara and the second race in Aguascalientes were moved one week. Several other date changes were made as well. Monterrey and the first Puebla event were joint races for the PEAK Mexico Series and the NASCAR FedEx Challenge Series, a PEAK Mexico support series in which competitors use similar cars, forming grids of over forty cars. Also has the NASCAR Mikel's Truck Series, the mexican version of NASCAR Gander Outdoors Truck Series as support of the PEAK Mexico Series.

No.	Race title	Track	Date
1	Gran Premio ARRIS	(Nuevo León) Autódromo Monterrey, Apodaca	31 March
2	Gran Premio AirBit Club	Súper Óvalo Chiapas, Tuxtla Gutiérrez	5 May
3	Gran Premio PEAK	(Jalisco) Trióvalo Internacional de Cajititlán, Guadalajara	19 May
4	Gran Premio Aguascalientes	Autódromo Internacional de Aguascalientes, Aguascalientes	9 June
5	Gran Premio Monster Energy	Autódromo Miguel E. Abed, Puebla	23 June
6	Gran Premio Chihuahua	(Chihuahua (state)) El Dorado Speedway, Juan Aldama	13 July
7	Gran Premio NAPA	(Querétaro) Autódromo del Ecocentro de la Unión Ganadera, El Marqués	4 August
8	Gran Premio Canel's	(San Luis Potosí) Autódromo Potosino, Zaragoza	1 September
9	Gran Premio Scotiabank	(Jalisco) Trióvalo Internacional de Cajititlán, Guadalajara	29 September
10	Gran Premio Red Cola	Autódromo Miguel E. Abed, Puebla	20 October
11	Gran Premio Aguascalientes	Autódromo Internacional de Aguascalientes, Aguascalientes	10 November
12	Gran Premio FedEx	Autódromo Hermanos Rodríguez, Mexico City	1 December

Oval
Road Course

== Final standings ==
Place	Driver	Points
1	Rubén García Jr. (racing driver)	496
2	Salvador de Alba, Jr.	475
3	Irwin Vences	462
4	Jorge Goeters	454
5	Ruben Rovelo	452
6	Abraham Calderon	450
7	Michel Jourdain, Jr.	420

== See also ==
- 2019 Monster Energy NASCAR Cup Series
- 2019 NASCAR Xfinity Series
- 2019 NASCAR Gander Outdoors Truck Series
- 2019 ARCA Menards Series
- 2019 NASCAR K&N Pro Series East
- 2019 NASCAR K&N Pro Series West
- 2019 NASCAR Whelen Modified Tour
- 2019 NASCAR Pinty's Series
- 2019 NASCAR Whelen Euro Series
