= 2006 Desafío Corona season =

- Desafío Corona

Season
- Races: 14
- Start date: March 26
- End date: December 3

Awards
- Champion: (Mexico) Rogelio López

The 2006 Desafio Corona season was the third season of stock car racing in Mexico, and the final with the name Desafío Corona.

== Schedule ==
The 2006 schedule included for first time Puebla as venue.

2006 Desafío Corona venues

No.	Race Title	Track	Date	Time	
No.	Race Title	Track	Date	Local	UTC
1	Guadalajara	(Jalisco) Trióvalo Bernardo Obregón, Guadalajara	March 26		
2	Puebla	(Puebla) Autódromo Miguel E. Abed, Amozoc	April 9		
3	Mexico City	Autódromo Hermanos Rodríguez, Mexico City	April 30		
4	San Luis Potosí	(San Luis Potosí) Autódromo Potosino, Zaragoza	May 21		
5	Guadalajara	(Jalisco) Trióvalo Bernardo Obregón, Guadalajara	June 4		
6	Querétaro	Autódromo Querétaro, El Marqués	June 23		
7	San Luis Potosí	(San Luis Potosí) Autódromo Potosino, Zaragoza	August 6		
8	Zacatecas	Autódromo Internacional de Zacatecas, Guadalupe	August 20		
9	Monterrey	(Nuevo León) Autódromo Monterrey, Apodaca	September 3		
10	Puebla	(Puebla) Autódromo Miguel E. Abed, Amozoc	September 24		
11	San Luis Potosí	(San Luis Potosí) Autódromo Potosino, Zaragoza	October 15		
12	Guadalajara	(Jalisco) Trióvalo Bernardo Obregón, Guadalajara	October 29		
13	Puebla	(Puebla) Autódromo Miguel E. Abed, Amozoc	November 12		
14	Mexico City	Autódromo Hermanos Rodríguez, Mexico City	December 3		

== Results ==
=== Races ===
No.	Race	Pole position	Most laps led	Winning driver	Winning manufacturer
1	(Jalisco) Guadalajara	(Mexico) Rubén García Novoa	(Mexico) Germán Quiroga	(Mexico) Germán Quiroga	(United States) Pontiac
2	Puebla	(Mexico) Rogelio López	(Mexico) Rogelio López	(Mexico) Rogelio López	(United States) Pontiac
3	Mexico City	(Mexico) Rogelio López	(Mexico) Carlos Pardo	(Mexico) Carlos Pardo	(United States) Pontiac
4	San Luis Potosí	(Mexico) Rogelio López	(Mexico) Fernando Plata	(Mexico) Fernando Plata	(United States) Pontiac
5	(Jalisco) Guadalajara	(Mexico) Antonio Pérez	(Mexico) Carlos Pardo	(Mexico) Carlos Pardo	(United States) Pontiac
6	Querétaro	(Mexico) Carlos Pardo	(Mexico) Rafael Martínez	(Mexico) Rafael Martínez	(United States) Ford
7	San Luis Potosí	(Mexico) Rogelio López	(Mexico) Carlos Pardo	(Mexico) Carlos Pardo	(United States) Pontiac
8	Zacatecas	(Mexico) Carlos Pardo	(Mexico) Rafael Martínez	(Mexico) Rafael Martínez	(United States) Ford
9	(Nuevo León) Monterrey	(Mexico) Carlos Pardo	(Mexico) Rafael Martínez	(Mexico) Carlos Pardo	(United States) Pontiac
10	Puebla	(Mexico) Rogelio López	(Mexico) Rogelio López	(Mexico) Rogelio López	(United States) Pontiac
11	San Luis Potosí	(Mexico) Rogelio López	(Mexico) Pepé Garfías	(Mexico) Rogelio López	(United States) Pontiac
12	(Jalisco) Guadalajara	(Mexico) Rogelio López	(Mexico) Rogelio López	(Mexico) Rogelio López	(United States) Pontiac
13	Puebla	(Mexico) Pepé Garfías	(Mexico) Rubén García Novoa	(Mexico) Freddy Tame, Jr.	(United States) Ford
14	Mexico City	(Mexico) Carlos Pardo	(Mexico) Rogelio López	(Mexico) Rogelio López	(United States) Pontiac
