= 2005 Desafío Corona season =

- Desafío Corona

Season
- Races: 14
- Start date: June 6
- End date: December 5

Awards
- Champion: (Mexico) Jorge Goeters

The 2005 Desafio Corona season was the second season of stock car racing in Mexico.

Jorge Goeters won the season championship.

== Cars ==
Ford Mustang made its debut in this year. Pontiac again won the majority of the races. Dodge won the other 3 races.

== Drivers ==
Team	Manufacturer	No.	Race Driver	Rounds
Team GP		3	Eduardo Goeters	All
Team GP		18	Jorge Goeters	All
Team GP		19	Patrick Goeters	All
Tame Racing	Ford	21	Freddy Tame, Jr.	All
Tame Racing	Ford	22	Patricio Jourdain	All

== Schedule ==
2005 Desafío Corona venues

No.	Race Title	Track	Date	Time	
No.	Race Title	Track	Date	Local	UTC
1	Mexico City	Autódromo Hermanos Rodríguez, Mexico City	March 5	15:00	21:00
2	Guadalajara	(Jalisco) Trióvalo Bernardo Obregón, Guadalajara	April 10		
3	Zacatecas	Autódromo Internacional de Zacatecas, Guadalupe	May 1	13:30	18:30
4	Querétaro	Autódromo Querétaro, El Marqués	May 15	13:30	18:30
5	San Luis Potosí	(San Luis Potosí) Autódromo Potosino, Zaragoza	June 5	13:30	18:30
6	Monterrey	(Nuevo León) Autódromo Monterrey, Apodaca	June 26	13:30	18:30
7	Guadalajara	(Jalisco) Trióvalo Bernardo Obregón, Guadalajara	July 17	13:30	18:30
8	San Luis Potosí	(San Luis Potosí) Autódromo Potosino, Zaragoza	August 7	13:30	18:30
9	Querétaro	Autódromo Querétaro, El Marqués	August 28	13:30	18:30
10	Zacatecas	Autódromo Internacional de Zacatecas, Guadalupe	September 18	13:30	18:30
11	Monterrey	(Nuevo León) Autódromo Monterrey, Apodaca	October 2	13:30	18:30
12	Guadalajara	(Jalisco) Trióvalo Bernardo Obregón, Guadalajara	October 23	13:30	18:30
13	San Luis Potosí	(San Luis Potosí) Autódromo Potosino, Zaragoza	November 13	13:30	19:30
14	Mexico City	Autódromo Hermanos Rodríguez, Mexico City	November 27	13:30	19:30

== Results ==
=== Races ===
No.	Race	Pole position	Most laps led	Winning driver	Winning manufacturer
1	Mexico City	(Mexico) Jorge Goeters		(Mexico) Patrick Goeters	(United States) Pontiac
2	(Jalisco) Guadalajara	(Mexico) Freddy Tame, Jr.	(Mexico) Jorge Goeters	(Mexico) Jorge Goeters	(United States) Pontiac
3	Zacatecas	(Mexico) Rogelio López	(Mexico) Rubén Pardo	(Mexico) Rubén Pardo	(United States) Pontiac
4	(Querétaro) Quéretaro	(Mexico) Rogelio López		(Mexico) Jorge Goeters	(United States) Pontiac
5	San Luis Potosí	(Mexico) Patrick Goeters	(Mexico) Rogelio López	(Mexico) Rogelio López	(United States) Pontiac
6	(Nuevo León) Monterrey	(Mexico) Rogelio López	(Mexico) Rogelio López	(Mexico) Rogelio López	(United States) Pontiac
7	(Jalisco) Guadalajara	(Mexico) Freddy Tame, Jr.		(Mexico) Rafael Martínez	(United States) Dodge
8	San Luis Potosí	(Mexico) Jorge Goeters	(Mexico) Rogelio López	(Mexico) Rogelio López	(United States) Pontiac
9	(Querétaro) Quéretaro	(Mexico) Rogelio López	(Mexico) Rogelio López	(Mexico) Rogelio López	(United States) Pontiac
10	Zacatecas	(Mexico) Jorge Goeters	(Mexico) Carlos Pardo	(Mexico) Rubén Pardo	(United States) Pontiac
11	(Nuevo León) Monterrey	(Mexico) Jorge Goeters	(Mexico) Rogelio López	(Mexico) Rogelio López	(United States) Pontiac
12	(Jalisco) Guadalajara	(Mexico) Rogelio López	(Mexico) Carlos Pardo	(Mexico) Rogelio López	(United States) Pontiac
13	San Luis Potosí	(Mexico) Rogelio López	(Mexico) Jorge Goeters	(Mexico) Jorge Goeters	(United States) Dodge
14	Mexico City	(Mexico) Rogelio López	(Mexico) Jorge Goeters	(Mexico) Jorge Goeters	(United States) Dodge

=== Standings ===
(key) Bold - Pole position awarded by time. Italics - Pole position set by final practice results or rainout. * – Most laps led.

The top 10

Rank	Driver	(Mexico City) MEX	(Jalisco) GDL	(Zacatecas) ZAC	(Querétaro) QRO	(San Luis Potosí) SLP	(Nuevo León) MTY	(Jalisco) GDL	(San Luis Potosí) SLP	(Querétaro) QRO	(Zacatecas) ZAC	(Nuevo León) MTY	(Jalisco) GDL	(San Luis Potosí) SLP	(Mexico City) MEX	Points
1	(Mexico) Jorge Goeters	**2**	1*	3												530
2	(Mexico) Rubén Pardo	4	6	1*												505
3	(Mexico) Patrick Goeters	1	3	7												491
4	(Mexico) José Garfias	33	5	8												482
5	(Mexico) Mara Reyes	10	9	4												473
6	(Mexico) Rafael Martinez	31	2	17												462
7	(Mexico) Freddy Tame, Jr.	20	**16**	5												450
8	(Mexico) Oscar Ruiz	18	7	15												449
9	(Mexico) Rogelio López	3	4	**20**												443
10	(Mexico) Ricardo Pérez de Lara	38	8	13												441
Rank	Driver	(Mexico City) MEX	(Jalisco) GDL	(Zacatecas) ZAC	(Querétaro) QRO	(San Luis Potosí) SLP	(Nuevo León) MTY	(Jalisco) GDL	(San Luis Potosí) SLP	(Querétaro) QRO	(Zacatecas) ZAC	(Nuevo León) MTY	(Jalisco) GDL	(San Luis Potosí) SLP	(Mexico City) MEX	Points
