= NASCAR Mexico Series in Querétaro =

NASCAR Mexico Series race held in El Marqués, Querétaro

Querétaro 200
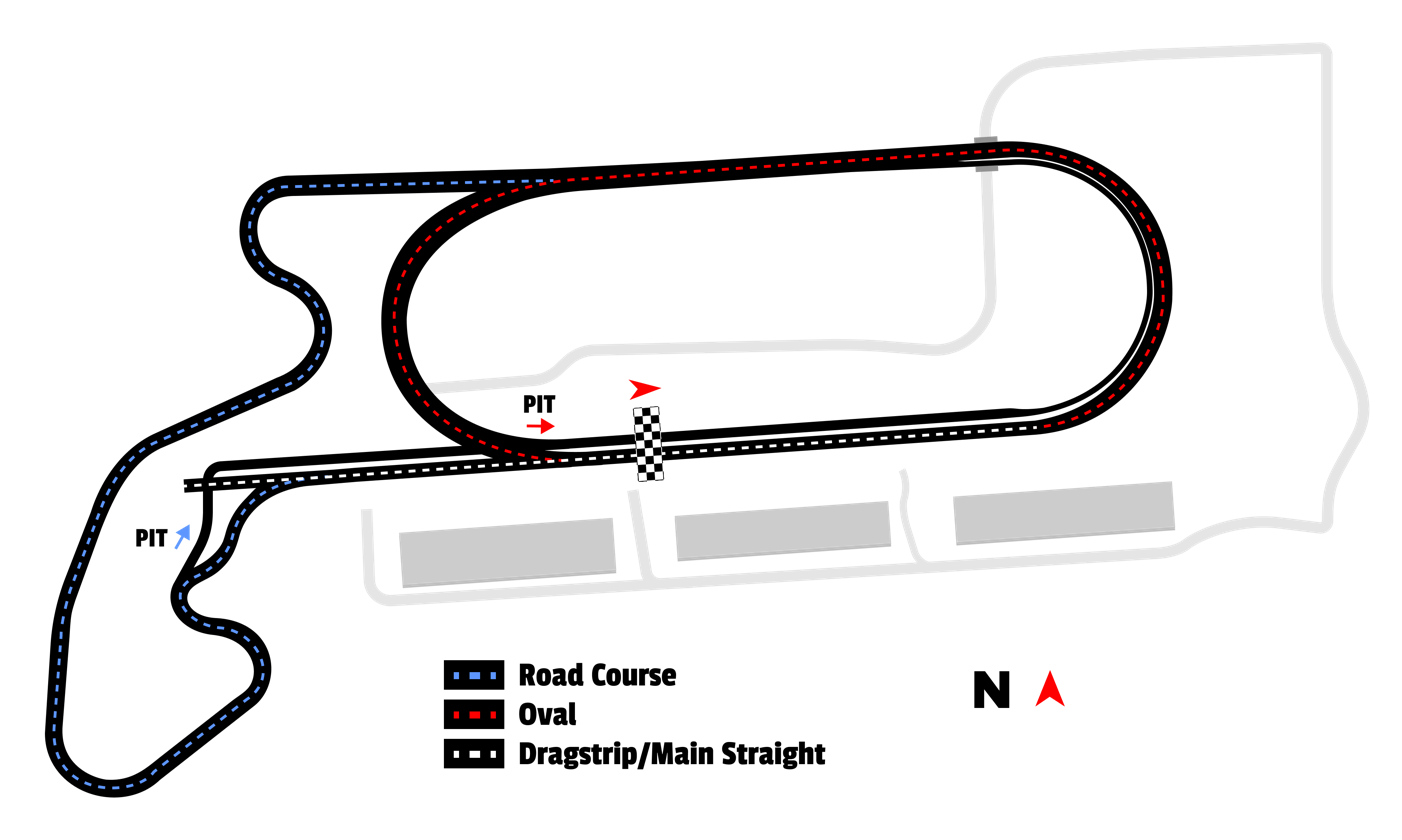

NASCAR Mexico Series
- Venue: EcoCentro Expositor Querétaro
- Location: El Marqués, Querétaro
- First race: 2004
- Distance: 179.62 km (111.58 mi)
- Laps: 140

Circuit information
- Length: 1.283 km (0.797 mi)
- Turns: 4

Former logo of the Querétaro 200

The NASCAR Mexico Series has been racing in the Mexican state of Querétaro since the series' inception in 2004.

The race is held at Autódromo de Quéretaro, which is located within the EcoCentro exhibition center — just east of the state's capital city of Santiago de Querétaro, in the municipality of El Marqués.

Rafael Martínez has taken 6 victories in Quéretaro, the most of any driver.

== History ==
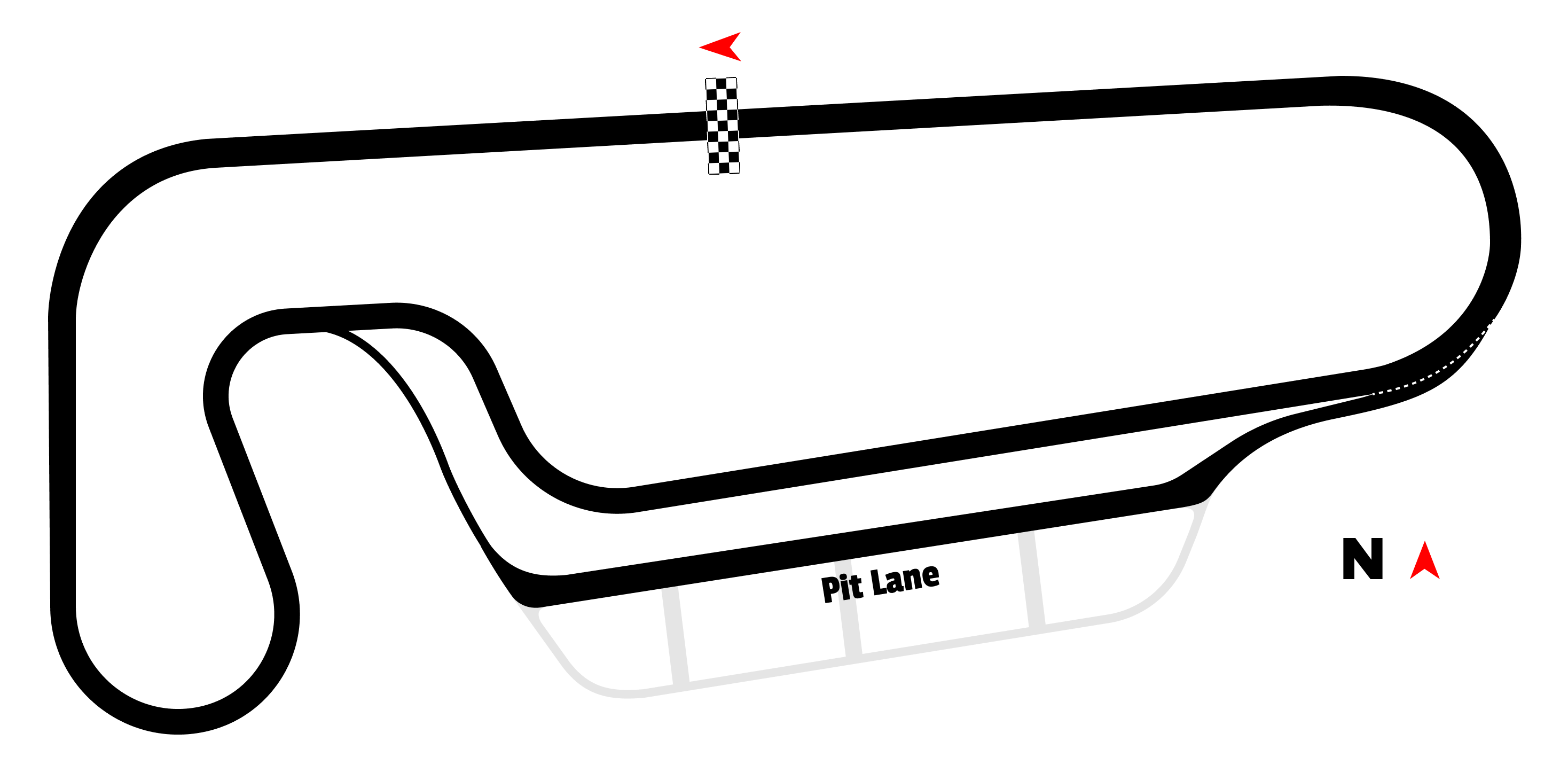
The layout of the original Autódromo de Querétaro

The race has historically been held at two different venues within the El Marqués municipality that share the same name.

The original Autódromo de Quéretaro hosted 7 NASCAR Mexico Series races between 2004 and 2007, before being replaced by the present-day circuit for the 2008 season. The new circuit was an attempt to provide more modern facilities and amenities for motorsport events in the area, such as an electronic timing and scoring system and race control tower.

The first race at the new venue was held on 30 March 2008, as the opening race of the season. Since then, the track has used two different configurations for NASCAR Mexico races — a 2.3 km (1.4 mi) road course, and a 1.3 km (0.8 mi) oval.

In 2020, Querétaro became the first location in series' history to host 5 races in a single season, in response to precautions taken due to the COVID-19 pandemic that resulted in several cancelled rounds.

== Winners ==
Race was held on an oval configuration
Race was held on a road course configuration

Year	Date	Driver	Team/Owner	Manufacturer	Laps	Miles (Km)	Race Time	Speed (mph)	Source/Report
Original Autódromo de Quéretaro (2004-07)
2004	18 July	(Mexico City) Carlos Contreras	Dynamic Motorsport	Pontiac	88	76.57 (123.2)	1:18:35.5	58.46	Report
2004	17 October	(Mexico City) Rubén Pardo	Escudería Telmex	Pontiac	85	73.96 (119)	1:18:07.6	56.80	Report
2005	15 May	(Mexico City) Jorge Goeters	Team GP	Pontiac	73	63.52 (102.2)	1:20:15.4	47.49	Report
2005	28 August	(Aguascalientes) Rogelio López	Escudería Telmex	Pontiac	75	65.26 (105)	1:19:11.3	49.45	Report
2006	23 June	(Nuevo León) Rafael Martínez		Ford					
2007	15 July	(Mexico City) Freddy Tame Jr.		Ford					
2007	28 October	(Nuevo León) Rafael Martínez		Ford					
EcoCentro Expositor Querétaro (2008-present)
2008	30 March	(Nuevo León) Rafael Martínez	Team GP	Ford	52	74.78 (120.35)	1:30:26	49.61	
2008	31 August	(Argentina) Waldemar Coronas	Team GP	Ford	63	90.59 (145.79)	1:42:40	52.95	
2009	28 June	(Mexico City) Hugo Oliveras	MM Racing	Toyota	68	97.78 (157.36)	1:42:47	57.08	
2009	11 October	(Mexico City) Rubén Rovelo	Escudería Telmex		132	105.2 (169.3)	1:40:23	62.88	
2010	11 April	(Nuevo León) Rafael Martínez	Team GP - Canel's	Mazda	75	107.85 (173.57)	2:00:21	53.77	
2010	3 October	(Jalisco) Antonio Pérez	Escudería Telmex	Chevrolet	160	127.52 (205.22)	2:03:35	61.92	
2011	5 June	(Mexico City) Homero Richards	NEXTEL Racing	Toyota	144	107.42 (172.88)	1:57:57	54.65	
2011	4 September	(Mexico City) Germán Quiroga	Equipo Telcel	Dodge	146	108.92 (175.29)	1:56:02	56.32	
2012	29 April	(Mexico City) Homero Richards	NEXTEL Racing	Toyota	166	123.84 (199.30)	2:24:10	51.82	
2012	12 August	(Nuevo León) Daniel Suárez	Equipo Telcel	Dodge	157	117.12 (188.49)	1:53:38	62.17	
2013	21 April	(Nuevo León) Rafael Martínez	Team GP - Canel's	Mazda	158	118.5 (190.7)	1:57:26	60.55	
2013	28 July	(Nuevo León) Rafael Martínez	Team GP - Canel's	Mazda	199	149.25 (240.19)	2:30:14	59.91	
2014	25 May	(Mexico City) Rubén Pardo	Rafael Oliveras	Toyota	157	117.75 (189.5)	2:09:20	54.63	
2014	3 August	(Mexico City) Homero Richards	M Racing	Toyota	157	117.75 (189.5)	2:20:31	50.28	
2015	17 May	(Mexico City) Rodrigo Peralta	Alcatel One Touch - Cinemex	Ford	154	115.5 (185.88)	2:00:05	60.96	
2017	20 August	(Mexico City) Irwin Vences	JV Motorsports	Toyota	119	89.25 (143.63)	1:19:49	71.30	
2018	19 August	(Mexico City) Rubén García Jr.	Team GP - Canel's	Toyota	33	49.2 (79.18)	51:06	57.77	
2019	4 August	(Jalisco) Salvador de Alba Jr.	Sidral Aga Racing	Ford	160	127.52 (205.22)	1:40:21	76.25	
2020	9 July	(Mexico City) Rubén Rovelo	Alessandros Racing	Toyota	150	119.55 (192.4)	1:54:54	60.83	
2020	2 October	(Jalisco) Salvador de Alba Jr.	Sidral Aga Racing	Ford	72	107.35 (172.76)	1:46:38	60.32	
2020	3 October	(Mexico City) Rubén Rovelo	Alessandros Racing	Toyota	72	107.35 (172.76)	1:54:52	56.08	
2020	27 November	(Mexico City) Rubén García Jr.	Team GP - Canel's	Toyota	154	122.74 (197.53)	1:40:04	71.72	
2020	28 November	(Mexico City) Rubén Rovelo	Alessandros Racing	Toyota	154	122.74 (197.53)	1:48:38	66.06	
2021	20 June	(Mexico City) Rubén Rovelo	Alessandros Racing	Ford	142	113.17 (182.13)	1:38:05	69.23	
2021	5 September	(Jalisco) Salvador de Alba Jr.	Sidral Aga Racing	Ford	65	96.92 (155.98)	1:33:36	62.13	
2022	8 May	(Jalisco) Salvador de Alba Jr.	Sidral Aga Racing	Ford	121	96.44 (155.21)	1:42:59	56.19	
2022	9 October	(Mexico City) José Luis Ramírez	Ramírez Racing Team	Ford	140	111.58 (179.57)	1:35:17	70.26	
2023	28 May	(Mexico City) Jake Cosío	Sidral Aga Racing Team	Ford	130	103.61 (166.74)	1:42:13	60.82	
2024	11 August	(Mexico City) Irwin Vences	Tame Racing	Ford	125	99.63 (160.34)	1:32:13	64.82	
2024	22 September	(Mexico City) Xavi Razo	JV Motorsports	Chevrolet	126	100.42 (161.61)	1:42:19	58.89	
2025	1 June	(San Luis Potosí) Alex de Alba	AGA Racing	Ford	140	111.58 (179.57)	1:33:35	71.54	Report

== Records ==
=== Most wins ===
Data accurate as of 2025 June race

Rank	Driver	Wins
1	(Nuevo León) Rafael Martínez	6
2	(Mexico City) Rubén Rovelo	5
3	(Jalisco) Salvador de Alba Jr.	4
4	(Mexico City) Homero Richards	3
5	(Mexico City) Irwin Vences	2
5	(Mexico City) Rubén García Jr.	2
5	(Mexico City) Rubén Pardo	2
9	(Aguascalientes) Rogelio López	1
9	(Argentina) Waldermar Coronas	1
9	(Jalisco) Antonio Pérez	1
9	(Mexico City) Hugo Oliveras	1
9	(Mexico City) Carlos Contreras	1
9	(Mexico City) Freddy Tame Jr.	1
9	(Mexico City) Germán Quiroga	1
9	(Mexico City) Jake Cosío	1
9	(Mexico City) Jorge Goeters	1
9	(Mexico City) José Luis Ramírez	1
9	(Mexico City) Rodrigo Peralta	1
9	(Mexico City) Xavi Razo	1
9	(Nuevo León) Daniel Suárez	1
9	(San Luis Potosí) Alex de Alba	1

=== Winning manufacturer ===
Rank	Manufacturer	Wins
1	(United States) General Motors	6
2	(United States) Ford	5
3	(Japan) Mazda	1
3	(Japan) Toyota	1
