= 2007 NASCAR Corona Series =

Seasons
- ← 2006 2008 →

The 2007 NASCAR Corona Series is the fourth season of NASCAR Mexico's major stock car racing series and the first under the name NASCAR Corona Series.

== Drivers ==
Team	Manufacturer	No.	Race Driver	Rounds
Tame Racing	Ford	21	Luis Felipe Montaño	All
Tame Racing	Ford	22	Homero Richards	All

== Schedule ==
The series kicked off at the Autodromo Hermanos Rodriguez in Mexico City, with a non-points-paying race during the weekend of March 4, along with events from the Busch Series and the Rolex Sports Car Series. The race was won by Carlos Pardo (#14 Dodge), followed by Rafael Martínez (#19 Ford) and Freddy Tame, Jr. (#18 Ford).

The schedule will consist of 14 points-paying races after the Mexico City race, 10 of which will be double-feature events with the NASCAR Mexico T4 Series.

Race	Race name	Track	Date	Time	
Race	Race name	Track	Date	Local	UTC
	NASCAR Mexico Corona Series Shootout	Autódromo Hermanos Rodríguez, Mexico City	March 4	9:57	15:57
1	Goodyear 150	(Puebla) Autódromo Miguel E. Abed, Amozoc	April 1	14:30	19:30
2	Gran Premio Zacatecas	Autódromo Internacional de Zacatecas, Zacatecas	April 22	13:30	18:30
3	Gran Premio San Luis	Autódromo Potosino, San Luis Potosí	May 6	13:30	18:30
4	Gran Premio Monterrey	(Nuevo León) Autódromo Monterrey, Apodaca	May 20	13:30	18:30
5	Mopar 100	Autódromo Hermanos Rodríguez, Mexico City	June 3	13:30	18:30
6	Gran Premio Zacatecas	Autódromo Internacional de Zacatecas, Zacatecas	June 24	13:30	18:30
7	Goodyear 150	Autódromo Querétaro, Querétaro	July 15	13:30	18:30
8	Gran Premio Guadalajara	(Jalisco) Trióvalo Bernardo Obregón, Guadalajara	July 29	13:30	18:30
9	Gran Premio San Luis	Autódromo Potosino, San Luis Potosí	August 12	13:30	18:30
10	Gran Premio Monterrey	(Nuevo León) Autódromo Monterrey, Apodaca	September 2	14:30	19:30
11	Gran Premio Puebla	(Puebla) Autódromo Miguel E. Abed, Amozoc	September 23	13:30	18:30
12	Goodyear 150	(Jalisco) Trióvalo Bernardo Obregón, Guadalajara	October 14	13:30	18:30
13	Gran Premio Querétaro	Autódromo Querétaro, Querétaro	October 28	13:40	18:40
14	Ford Racing Lap	Autódromo Hermanos Rodríguez, Mexico City	November 4	13:40	19:40

== Results ==
No.	Race	Pole position	Most Laps Led	Winning driver	Winning manufacturer
	NASCAR Mexico Corona Series Shootout	Carlos Pardo	Carlos Pardo	Carlos Pardo	Dodge
1	Goodyear 150	Rafael Martínez	Rafael Martínez	Rafael Martínez	Ford
2	Gran Premio Zacatecas	Rafael Martínez	Carlos Pardo	Rafael Martínez	Ford
3	Gran Premio San Luis	Antonio Pérez	Germán Quiroga	Rafael Martínez	Ford
4	Gran Premio Monterrey	Rafael Martínez	Rafael Martínez	Rafael Martínez	Ford
5	Mopar 100	Antonio Pérez	Germán Quiroga	Germán Quiroga	Pontiac
6	Gran Premio Zacatecas	Carlos Pardo	Freddy Tame, Jr.	Rafael Martínez	Ford
7	Goodyear 150	Antonio Pérez	Jorge Goeters	Freddy Tame, Jr.	Ford
8	Gran Premio Guadalajara	Rafael Martínez^{2}	Rafael Martínez	Jorge Goeters	Dodge
9	Gran Premio San Luis	Luis Felipe Montaño	Oscar Ruíz	Rafael Martínez	Ford
10	Gran Premio Monterrey	Germán Quiroga^{3}	Antonio Pérez	Antonio Pérez	Pontiac
11	Gran Premio de Puebla	Carlos Pardo	Germán Quiroga	Germán Quiroga	Pontiac
12	Goodyear 150	Fernando Plata	Germán Quiroga	Germán Quiroga	Ford
13	Premio Querétaro	Rafael Martínez	Rafael Martínez	Rafael Martínez	Ford
14	Ford Racing Lap	Jorge Goeters	Germán Quiroga	Germán Quiroga	Pontiac

1 Qualifying cancelled by rain.
2 Qualifying cancelled by rain.
3 Qualifying cancelled by rain.

== See also ==
- 2007 NASCAR Nextel Cup Series
- 2007 NASCAR Busch Series
- 2007 NASCAR Craftsman Truck Series
- 2007 NASCAR Busch East Series
- 2007 ARCA Re/Max Series
- 2007 NASCAR Whelen Modified Tour
- 2007 NASCAR Whelen Southern Modified Tour
- 2007 NASCAR Canadian Tire Series
