= 2008 NASCAR Corona Series =

Seasons
- ← 2007 2009 →

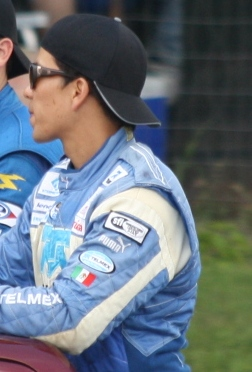
Antonio Pérez Mendoza, the 2008 NASCAR Mexico Series champion.

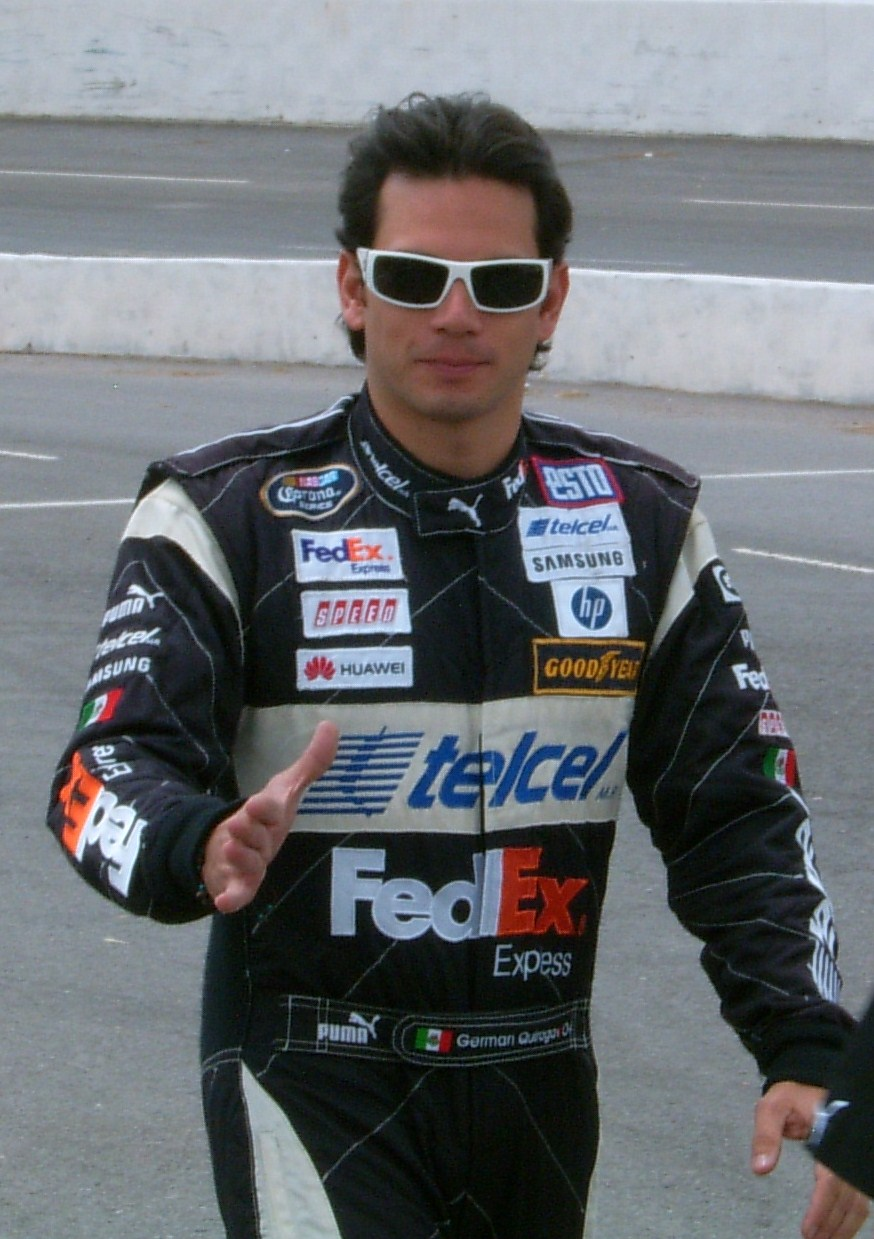
Germán Quiroga, finished second in the championship.

The 2008 NASCAR Corona Series was the fifth season of NASCAR-sanctioned stock car racing in Mexico.

== Drivers ==
Team	Manufacturer	No.	Race Driver	Rounds
Escuderia Telmex	Dodge	1	Antonio Pérez	All
Escuderia Telmex	Ford	2	Rubén Rovelo	All
Escuderia Telmex	Pontiac	3	Jimmy Morales	
Equipo Telcel	Ford	5	Germán Quiroga	All
Equipo Telcel	Pontiac	6	Ricardo Pérez de Lara	All
2B Racing	Pontiac	7	Carlos Peralta	All
2B Racing	Pontiac	10	Oscar Peralta	
Team GP	Ford	18	Rafael Martínez	All
Team GP	Ford	19	Freddy Tame, Jr.	All
Team GP	Ford	48	Waldemar Coronas	
Tame Racing	Ford	21	Carlos Pardo	All
Tame Racing	Ford	22	Carlos Contreras	All

== Schedule ==
2008 venues

No.	Race title	Track	Date	Time
1	Querétaro	Autódromo Querétaro, El Marqués	March 30	13:40
2	Mexico City	Autódromo Hermanos Rodríguez, Mexico City	April 20	11:30
3	San Luis Potosí	(San Luis Potosí) Autódromo Potosino, Zaragoza	May 4	13:10
4	Guadalajara	(Jalisco) Trióvalo Bernardo Obregón, Guadalajara	May 18	13:30
5	Zacatecas	Autódromo de Zacatecas, Zacatecas	June 1	13:10
6	Puebla	Autódromo Miguel E. Abed, Puebla	June 15	13:10
7	Monterrey	(Nuevo León) Autódromo Monterrey, Apodaca	June 29	13:10
8	San Luis Potosí	(San Luis Potosí) Autódromo Potosino, Zaragoza	July 13	13:10
9	Guadalajara	(Jalisco) Trióvalo Bernardo Obregón, Guadalajara	July 27	13:30
10	Puebla	Autódromo Miguel E. Abed, Puebla	August 17	13:10
11	Quéretaro	Autódromo Querétaro, El Marqués	August 31	13:10
12	San Luis Potosí	(San Luis Potosí) Autódromo Potosino, Zaragoza	September 21	13:10
13	Chiapas	Autódromo Chiapas, Tuxtla Gutiérrez	October 12	13:10
14	Mexico City	Autódromo Hermanos Rodríguez, Mexico City	October 26	13:10

== Results and standings ==
=== Races ===
No.	Race	Pole position	Most lap led	Winning driver	Winning manufacturer
1	Querétaro	Rafael Martínez	Rafael Martínez	Rafael Martínez	Ford
2	Mexico City	Homero Richards	Rafael Martínez	Patrick Goeters	Ford
3	San Luis Potosí	Antonio Pérez	Germán Quiroga	Antonio Pérez	Dodge
4	Guadalajara	Germán Quiroga	Carlos Pardo	Rubén Rovelo	Ford
5	Zacatecas	Rafael Martínez	Rafael Martínez	Ricardo Pérez de Lara	Ford
6	Puebla	Homero Richards	Homero Richards	Antonio Pérez	Dodge
7	Monterrey	Jorge Goeters	Antonio Pérez	Antonio Pérez	Dodge
8	San Luis Potosí	Carlos Pardo	Carlos Pardo	Germán Quiroga	Ford
9	Guadalajara	Antonio Pérez	Antonio Pérez	Antonio Pérez	Dodge
10	Puebla	Homero Richards	Rafael Martínez	Rafael Martínez	Ford
11	Quéretaro	Homero Richards	Homero Richards	Waldemar Coronas	Ford
12	San Luis Potosí	Homero Richards	Germán Quiroga	Germán Quiroga	Ford
13	Chiapas	Carlos Contreras	Germán Quiroga	Antonio Pérez	Dodge
14	Mexico City	Homero Richards	Homero Richards	Carlos Pardo	Ford

=== Standings ===
(key) Bold - Pole position awarded by time. Italics - Pole position set by final practice results or rainout. * – Most laps led.

The top 10

Rank	Driver	QRO	MXC	SLP	GDL	ZAC	PUE	MTY	SL2	GD2	PU2	QR2	SL3	TXG	MX2	Points
1	Antonio Pérez	25	8	1	30	9	1	1	2	1	3	7	3	1	2	2182
2	Germán Quiroga	10	3	22	12	3	4	3	1	6	4	4	1	2	21	2153
3	Rafael Martínez	1	2	26	3	2	3	7	3	23	1	21	4	8	23	2046
4	Homero Richards	4	12	19	8	5	2	5	15	4	2	2	2	18	26	1997
5	Carlos Pardo	8	4	10	2	11	14	12	4	16	13	23	5	19	1	1968
6	Jorge Goeters	5	25	5	6	6	5	9	6	11	26	6	27	15	3	1896
7	Rubén Rovelo	14	10	21	1	8	7	2	5	18	8	27	6	16	16	1891
8	Patrick Goeters	2	1	9	5	14	13	20	12	5	17	5	23	21	9	1881
9	Carlos Peralta	7	13	17	13	4	10	6	13	10	16	9	7	4	22	1864
10	Luis Felipe Montaño	3	16	15	4	23	23	8	7	26	11	3	13	17	4	1810
Rank	Driver	QRO	MXC	SLP	GDL	ZAC	PUE	MTY	SL2	GD2	PU2	QR2	SL3	TXG	MX2	Points
	References															

== See also ==
- 2008 NASCAR Sprint Cup Series
- 2008 NASCAR Nationwide Series
- 2008 NASCAR Craftsman Truck Series
- 2008 NASCAR Camping World East Series
- 2008 NASCAR Camping World West Series
- 2008 ARCA Re/Max Series
- 2008 NASCAR Whelen Modified Tour
- 2008 NASCAR Whelen Southern Modified Tour
- 2008 NASCAR Canadian Tire Series
