= NASCAR Mexico Series at San Luis Potosí =

San Luis Capital 200

NASCAR Mexico Series
- Venue: Super Óvalo Potosino (2005–present); Autódromo San Luis 400 (2004)
- Location: San Luis Potosí City, San Luis Potosí
- First race: 2004
- Distance: 160.8 km (100 mi)
- Laps: 200

Circuit information
- Length: 0.804 km (0.500 mi)
- Turns: 4

The NASCAR Mexico Series has held races in San Luis Potosí since 2004, when it was known as the Desafío Corona. The race is held at the Super Óvalo Potosino, in the capital city of the state with the same name.

== History ==
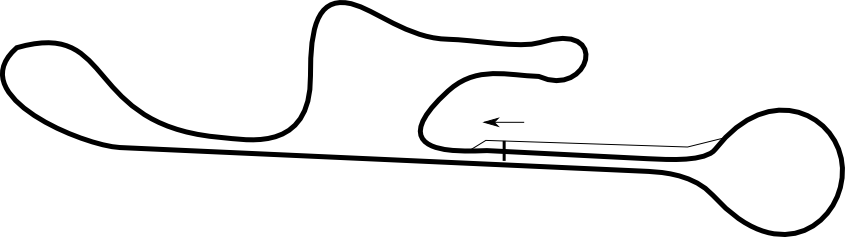
Layout of Autodrómo San Luis 400, used in 2004

The inaugural race in San Luis Potosí was held on 22 August 2004 in the Autodrómo San Luis 400, a road course built in the Parque Tangamanga.

For the 2005 season, the race was moved to the Super Óvalo Potosino, which had just been remodeled into an oval track.

== Winners ==
Year	Date	Driver	Team	Manufacturer	Race Distance		Race Time	Average Speed (mph)	Report
Year	Date	Driver	Team	Manufacturer	Laps	Miles (km)	Race Time	Average Speed (mph)	Report
Autódromo San Luis 400
2004	August 22	(Mexico City) Germán Quiroga	Seman Baker	Dodge	45	65.16 (104.85)			
2004	November 28	(Aguascalientes) Rogelio López	Equipo Telcel-Sun-Motorola	Pontiac	45	65.16 (104.85)			
Super Óvalo Potosino
2005	June 5	(Aguascalientes) Rogelio López		Pontiac	113	56.46 (90.852)	1:20:15.9	42.20	
2005	August 7	(Aguascalientes) Rogelio López		Pontiac	120	58.97 (94.88)	1:14:41.2	48.17	
2005	November 13	(Mexico City) Jorge Goeters		Dodge	122	60.96 (98.08)	1:08:02.4	53.75	
2006	May 21	(Jalisco) Fernando Plata		Pontiac	122	60.96 (98.08)	1:23:50.0	43.63	
2006	August 6	(Mexico City) Carlos Pardo	Equipo Telcel	Dodge	120	58.97 (94.88)	1:02:46.2	57.31	
2006	October 15	(Aguascalientes) Rogelio López	Escuderia Telmex	Pontiac	100	49.14 (87.50)	1:20:23.7	36.67	
2007	May 20	(Nuevo León) Rafael Martínez	Team GP	Ford	120	58.97 (94.88)	1:16:54.330	46.00	
2007	August 12	(Nuevo León) Rafael Martínez	Team GP	Ford	105	50.75 (94.88)	1:21:39	43.33	
2008	May 4	(Jalisco) Antonio Pérez	Escuderia Telmex	Dodge	120	60 (96.0)	1:27:27	41.25	Report
2008	July 13	(Mexico City) Germán Quiroga	Equipo Telcel	Ford	120	60 (96.0)	1:45:13	41.47	
2008	September 21	(Mexico City) Germán Quiroga	Equipo Telcel	Ford	150	75 (120.68)	1:21:34	55.18	
2009	May 31	(Mexico City) Germán Quiroga	Equipo Telcel	Ford	150	75 (120.68)	1:24:54	53.00	
2009	August 16	(Mexico City) Jorge Goeters	Team GP	Toyota	200	100 (160.90)	1:37:52	61.31	
2010	May 2	(Mexico City) Jorge Goeters	Team GP	Mazda	192	96 (154.46)	2:01:18	47.49	Report
2010	September 5	(Mexico City) Germán Quiroga	Equipo Telcel	Dodge	204	102 (164.11)	2:02:22	50.01	Report
2011	April 3	(Mexico City) Jorge Goeters	Team GP	Mazda	210	105 (168.95)	1:58:34	53.13	Report
2011	7 August	(Mexico City) Homero Richards	H&HighSpeed	Toyota	205	102.5 (164.92)	1:55:09	53.41	Report
2011	6 November	(Mexico City) Germán Quiroga	Equipo Telcel	Dodge	183	91.5 (147.22)	1:15:19	72.89	Report
2012	15 April	(Jalisco) Antonio Pérez	Escuderia Telmex	Chevrolet	250	125 (201.17)	2:22:48	52.52	Report
2012	29 July	(Nuevo León) Rafael Martínez	Team GP	Mazda	258	129 (207.56)	2:40:29	48.23	Report
2013	24 March	(Mexico City) Homero Richards	NEXTEL Racing	Toyota	250	125 (201.17)	2:37:03	47.72	
2013	25 August	(Jalisco) Antonio Pérez	Escudería Telmex	Chevrolet	167	83.5 (134.38)	2:37:13	31.84	
2014	11 May	(Aguascalientes) Rogelio López	Alpha Racing	Toyota	250	125 (201.17)	2:21:25	52.72	
2014	21 September	(State of Mexico) Irwin Vences	M Racing	Toyota	250	125 (201.17)	5:42:11 (Note: Race was red-flagged for rain.)	21.79	
2015	12 April	(Mexico City) Rubén Rovelo	G3C Racing Team	Dodge	196	98 (157.72)	2:09:20	45.20	
2015	12 July	(State of Mexico) Irwin Vences	M Racing	Ford	242	121 (194.73)	2:14:09	53.80	
2015	13 September	(Mexico City) Rubén Rovelo	G3C Racing Team	Dodge	226	113 (181.86)	2:07:11	53.00	
2017	23 April	(Aguascalientes) Rogelio López	Alpha Racing	Toyota	147	73.5 (118.29)	1:21:04	54.35	
2018	22 April	(State of Mexico) Irwin Vences	Interjet-Galem-Apy	Toyota	164	82 (131.97)	1:19:55	61.56	
2019	1 September	(Mexico City) Rubén Rovelo	Escuderia GT	Toyota	200	100 (160.8)	1:41:58	58.84	
2020	30 July	(Mexico City) Rubén Rovelo	Alessandros Racing	Toyota	210	105 (168.98)	1:49:18	57.59	
2020	22 October	(Jalisco) Salvador de Alba	Sidral AGA Racing Team	Ford	236	118 (189.9)	2:23:20	49.35	Report
2021	22 August	(Nuevo León) Abraham Calderón	Commscope-Telcel-Ruckus	Chevrolet	186	93 (149.67)	1:41:53	54.77	Report
2021	24 October	(Mexico City) Ruben Rovelo	Alessandros Racing	Ford	199	99.5 (160.13)	1:33:20	63.96	Report
2022	7 August	(Mexico City) Rubén García Jr.	Team GP - Canel's	Chevrolet	213	106.5 (171.39)	1:56:20	54.93	Report
2023	16 April	(Jalisco) Salvador de Alba	Sidral AGA Racing Team	Ford	184	92 (148.06)	1:38:55	55.80	Report
2023	13 August	(Mexico City) Rubén García Jr.	Team GP - Canel's	Chevrolet	200	100 (160.8)	1:36:32	62.15	Report
2024	24 March	(Mexico City) Rubén García Jr.	Team GP - Canel's	Chevrolet	182	91 (146.45)	1:40:09	54.52	Report
2024	21 July	(Mexico City) Rubén García Jr.	Team GP - Canel's	Chevrolet	200	100 (160.8)	1:40:50	59.50	Report
2025	2 March	(Mexico City) Rubén García Jr.	Team GP - Canel's	Chevrolet	173	86.5 (139.2)	1:42:35	50.59	Report
2025	5 October								

== Records ==
=== Most Wins ===
Rank	Driver	Wins
1	(Mexico City) Germán Quiroga	6
1	(Aguascalientes) Rogelio López	6
3	(Mexico City) Ruben Rovelo	5
3	(Mexico City) Rubén García Jr.	5
5	(Mexico City) Jorge Goeters	4
6	(Nuevo León) Rafael Martínez	3
6	(Jalisco) Antonio Pérez	3
6	(State of Mexico) Irwin Vences	3
9	(Mexico City) Homero Richards	2
9	(Jalisco) Salvador de Alba	2
11	(Mexico City) Carlos Pardo	1
11	(Jalisco) Fernando Plata	1
11	(Nuevo León) Abraham Calderón	1
