= Rubén Pardo =

Rubén Pardo may refer to:

- Rubén Pardo (racing driver) (born 1979), Mexican stock car racing driver
- Rubén Pardo (footballer) (born 1992), Spanish footballer
