= Desafío Corona =

Stock car racing series

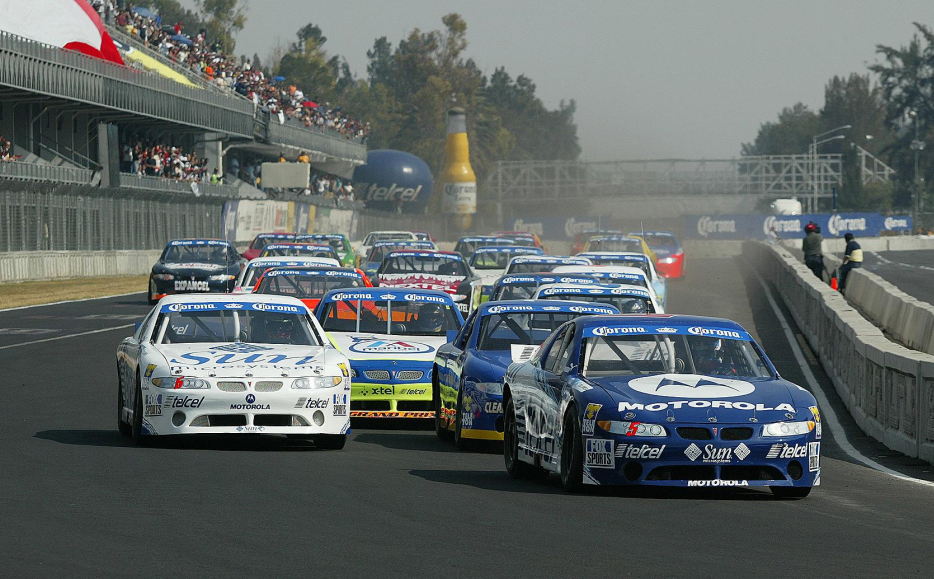
Desafío Corona Series in 2004

The Desafío Corona was a stock car racing series in Mexico. NASCAR founded the series in 2004 in conjunction with OCESA, a Mexican entertainment company. The business partnership between NASCAR and OCESA resulted in the creation of a new entity, now officially known as NASCAR Mexico. The former Desafío Corona series is now known as NASCAR Mexico Series.

== Origins ==
The series was originally known as MasterCard Truck Series, which was a Craftsman Truck Series look-alike series, founded in 2002.

After the intervention of OCESA, and with the help of SELCA, the Truck Series began to be operated by OCESA Automovilismo, while SELCA was responsible for running the show, being the sanctioning body of the series. After the end of the 2003 season, it was presented at the season finale, the Teleton 100, the new 2004 stock car, a Pontiac Grand Prix, which marked the end of the trucks chapter, and the start of a new era: stock car racing in Mexico.

After that, working together with NASCAR, they started to work on safety aspects of cars, adoption of new rules, and rebuilding existing race tracks, or even building new ones.

Their first season started with a schedule of 14 races, with Mara Reyes (Telmex #1 Pontiac) taking pole position for the season opener in Autodromo Hermanos Rodriguez, a race where 26 cars started the race, a big number for Mexican motorsports. This race was won by Jorge Goeters (Canel's #18 Pontiac), after 90 laps to the 1-mile (1.6 km) oval.

The series then went to Guadalajara and Querétaro, races won by Carlos Contreras, but bad luck came in the 4th race in Monterrey, where in lap 37 of the race, driver Marcelo Núñez lost control of his car, and was struck at full speed by Rafael Vallina. Núñez spent a week in intensive therapy, only to die of complications by the crash, including a broken pelvic bone and a perforated lung.

At the end of the season, Carlos Pardo of Team Telcel emerged as champion, ahead of his brother Rubén Pardo (Telmex #2 Pontiac), with Rogelio López (2006 Champ) of Telcel 3rd.

== Cars ==
The series' competitors race stock cars similar to those used in late model classes at short tracks in the United States, with fiberglass composite bodies and spec engines.

Although there are various cars, they are all under the same rules, which are often modified in the course of the season.

=== Specifications ===
- Engine:
  - Chevrolet HO 350 Vortec 5.7 liter
  - Dodge Magnum 360 crate motor
  - Ford 351 Roush
  - 400 horsepower @ 5850 RPM
  - 16 valves
  - 4 Barrell Holley carburetor
  - Torque: 387 lbf⋅ft (525 N⋅m) @ 4000 rpm
  - Max speed: 280 km/h (170 mph)
  - 4-speed transmission
- Brakes: 4 wheel discs
- Fuel: Sunoco 110 octane
- Fuel capacity: 15 gallon
- Tires:
  - Front slick tyres: 8x15x27.0
  - Rear slick tyres: 10x15x27.0
- Chassis make:
  - ENCO (Mexican made)
  - Spec Truck (American made)
- Fiberglass bodies:
  - Chevrolet Monte Carlo
  - Pontiac Grand Prix
  - Dodge Stratus (Dodge Charger for 2007)
  - Ford Fusion, Ford Mustang

== Supporting races ==
In 2005, most previous and current champions of all of the racing series in Mexico moved into the series (with the notable absence of open-wheel champions, like Homero Richards), leaving other closed wheel series with young and inexperienced drivers, so the Desafio Corona decided to include those series in a supporting role. First they included the Dodge Challenge, which included Neon T4 and Dodge Ram pickups, and for 2006, they concentrated on giving a push to the T4 Series. In some races, they included the Clio Cup Mexico series.

In 2007, the NASCAR Mexico T4 Series became the main support series.

== Past champions ==
- 2006: Rogelio López
- 2005: Jorge Goeters
- 2004: Carlos Pardo
