= Escudería Telmex =

Racing team

Escudería Telmex is an auto racing team founded by Mexican businessman Carlos Slim in 2002. The program is designed to provide support for both veteran and up-and-coming Latin American drivers.

== Current drivers ==
Driver	Series
(Mexico) Sergio Pérez	Formula One World Championship
(Mexico) Daniel Suárez	NASCAR Cup Series
(Mexico) Andrés Pérez de Lara	ARCA Menards Series; ARCA Menards Series East; ARCA Menards Series West; NASCAR Mexico NASCAR Craftsman Truck Series
(Mexico) Santiago Ramos	TBA
(Mexico) Benito Guerra Jr.	Nitrocross Championship
(Brazil) Enzo Fittipaldi	2026 Indy NXT
(Colombia) Tatiana Calderón	IMSA SportsCar Championship
(Mexico) Sebastián Álvarez	European Le Mans Series; IMSA SportsCar Championship
(Brazil) Pietro Fittipaldi	TBA
(Mexico) Abraham Calderón	NASCAR Mexico
(Mexico) Luis Michael Dörrbecker	NASCAR Mexico
(Mexico) Max Gutiérrez	NASCAR Mexico
(Mexico) Pancho Name	Mexican Rally Championship
(Mexico) Rogelio Lopez III	NASCAR Mexico
(Mexico) Eloy Sebastian	NASCAR Mexico
(Colombia) Sebastián Montoya	2026 Formula 2 Championship
(Mexico) Ian Aguilera	European Le Mans Series
(Mexico) Diego Menchaca	TBA
(Brazil) Emerson Fittipaldi Jr.	2026 Formula 2 Championship
(Mexico) Alex García	FIA World Endurance Championship; European Le Mans Series; Asian Le Mans Series
(Mexico) Jorge Hernández	Reto Telmex
(Mexico) Jesse Carrasquedo Jr.	Formula Regional Middle East Championship; Formula Regional European Championship Eurocup-3
(Mexico) Manuel Roza	TBA
(United States) Juan Manuel Correa	2026 Indy NXT
(Mexico) Rafael Villagómez	FIA Formula 2 Championship
(Brazil) Caio Collet	Indycar
(Mexico) Memo Rojas	Retired
