= Regia 200 =

NASCAR Mexico Series
- Venue: Autódromo Monterrey
- First race: 2004
- Distance: 200 km (124.3 mi)

Regia 200 is a NASCAR Corona Series race. Autódromo Monterrey in Apodaca, Nuevo León is the venue. The two layouts of the circuit has been used. For first time in 2011 season both layout will be used for this race.

== Winners ==
Year	Date	Driver	Team	Manufacturer	Race Distance		Race Time	Average Speed
Year	Date	Driver	Team	Manufacturer	Laps	Miles(Km)	Race Time	Average Speed
2004	August 1	(Nuevo León) César Tiberio Jiménez	Escudería Zeppelin	(United States) Pontiac	80	80 (128.72)	1:20:32.2	59.60
2005	June 26	(Aguascalientes) Rogelio López	Escudería Telmex	(United States) Pontiac	50	99.44 (160.00)	1:19:15.635	75.28
2005	October 22	(Aguascalientes) Rogelio López	Escudería Telmex	(United States) Pontiac	48	95.46 (153.60)^{1}	1:20:45.334	70.93
2006	September 3	(Mexico City) Carlos Pardo	Equipo Telcel	(United States) Pontiac	46	91.48 (147.20)^{2}	1:22:39.659	66.40
2007	May 20	(Nuevo León) Rafael Martínez	Team GP	(United States) Ford	67	67.00 (107.83)	1:26:30.443	74.79
2007	September 2	(Jalisco) Antonio Pérez	Escuderia Telmex	(United States) Pontiac	125	125.00 (201.15)	2:24:35.742	51.87
2008	June 29	(Jalisco) Antonio Pérez	Escuderia Telmex	(United States) Dodge	66	66.00 (106.19)	1:45:13.065	37.64
2009	September 20	(Mexico City) Germán Quiroga	Equipo Telcel	(United States) Pontiac	99	99.00 (159.29)	1:40:38.830	59.02
2010	August 22	(Mexico City) Rubén Rovelo	Escuderia Telmex	(United States) Chevrolet	63	125.29 (201.60)	1:44:33.393	71.89
2011	March 20	(Mexico City) Patrick Goeters	SC Racing	(United States) Chevrolet	62	123.28 (198.40)	2:00:34.144	61.35
2011	August 7	(Nuevo León) Rafael Martínez	Team GP	(Japan) Mazda	112	112.00 (180.21)		
2012	March 25	(Mexico City) Rubén Rovelo	Escuderia Telmex	(Japan) Toyota	63	125.29 (201.60)	2:08:03.772	58.678

1 Shortened 2 laps by time limit (1:20).
1 Shortened 9 laps by time limit.

== Records ==
=== Most wins ===
Rank	Driver	Wins
1	(Aguascalientes) Rogelio López	2
1	(Jalisco) Antonio Pérez	2
1	(Nuevo León) Rafael Martínez	2
1	(Mexico City) Rubén Rovelo	2
5	(Nuevo León) César Tiberio Jiménez	1
5	(Mexico City) Carlos Pardo	1
5	(Mexico City) Germán Quiroga	1
5	(Mexico City) Patrick Goeters	1
