= Autódromo de León =

Motorsport venue in León, Guanajuato

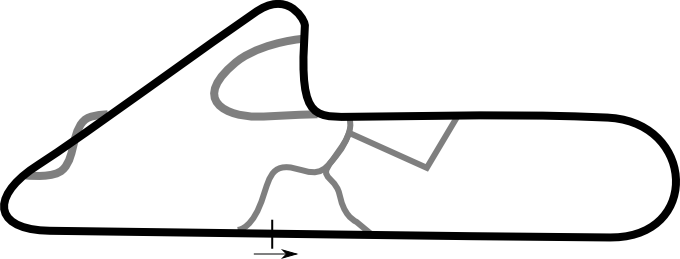
- Full Circuit (1976–present)
- Location: León, Guanajuato
- Coordinates: 21°02′09″N 101°34′31″W
- Opened: 1976
- Major events: Former: NASCAR Mexico Series (2004, 2017)
- Website: http://www.autodromodeleon.com/

Full Circuit (1976–present)
- Surface: Asphalt
- Length: 1.21 km (0.75 mi)

Autódromo de León in León, Guanajuato is a motorsport venue. The racetrack was opened in 1976. It is 0.75 mi (1.21 km) long. The Copa Marlboro, Formula 2, Formula 3, Copa Mustang, Tractocamiones, Sport Prototipos, Motos 600, Formula K, Superformula and GT-championships ran or are running at this venue. The venue hosted some stages of Rally Mexico.

The track hosted NASCAR Mexico Series events in the 2004 and 2017 seasons.

== Layout ==
The track has the shape of a half arrow and has a length 0.75 mi (1.21 km).
