= Patrick Goeters =

- Born: July 12, 1972 (age 54); San Luis Potosi, Mexico

NASCAR O'Reilly Auto Parts Series career
- 1 race run over 1 year
- First race: 2006 Telcel Motorola 200 (Mexico City)
Wins	Top tens	Poles
0	0	0
- Statistics up to date as of January 19, 2025.

Patrick Goeters (born July 12, 1972) is a Mexican racecar driver from San Luis Potosi. He is the brother of Jorge Goeters. He competed in the NASCAR Mexico Series from 2008 to 2019, collecting four wins. He also competed in one NASCAR Xfinity Series race, finishing 31st at Mexico City in 2006.

When his brother Jorge notably won the pole for the first O'Reilly Auto Parts Series race in Mexico in 2005, Patrick won the companion Corona Challenge race that same weekend. After his victory, the two brothers embraced atop Patrick's car.
