= Antonio Pérez (racing driver) =

Mexican professional stock car racing driver

Antonio Pérez Mendoza
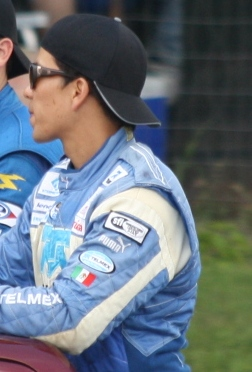
- Pérez in his 2010 start at Road America
- Born: 20 March 1986 (age 40); Guadalajara, Mexico
- Achievements: 2008 NASCAR Corona Series champion
- Awards: 2007 NASCAR Corona Series Rookie of the Year

NASCAR O'Reilly Auto Parts Series career
- 7 races run over 4 years
- Best finish: 110th (2010)
- First race: 2007 Telcel-Motorola Mexico 200 (Mexico City)
- Last race: 2010 5-Hour Energy 250 (Gateway)
| Wins | Top tens | Poles |
|---|---|---|
| 0 | 0 | 0 |

NASCAR Mexico Series career
- 113 races run over 8 years
- 2015 position: 12th
- Best finish: 1st (2008)
- First race: 2005
- Last race: 2015 RedCo 240 (Chiapas)
- First win: 2007 Regia 200 (Monterrey)
- Last win: 2013 Potosina 200 (Potosino)
| Wins | Top tens | Poles |
|---|---|---|
| 3 | 42 | 5 |

Antonio Pérez Mendoza (born 20 March 1986) is a Mexican retired stock car racing driver. He last competed in the NASCAR Mexico Series, driving the No. 1 Toyota for Jimmy Morales. He is the 2008 NASCAR Corona Series champion.

== Racing career ==
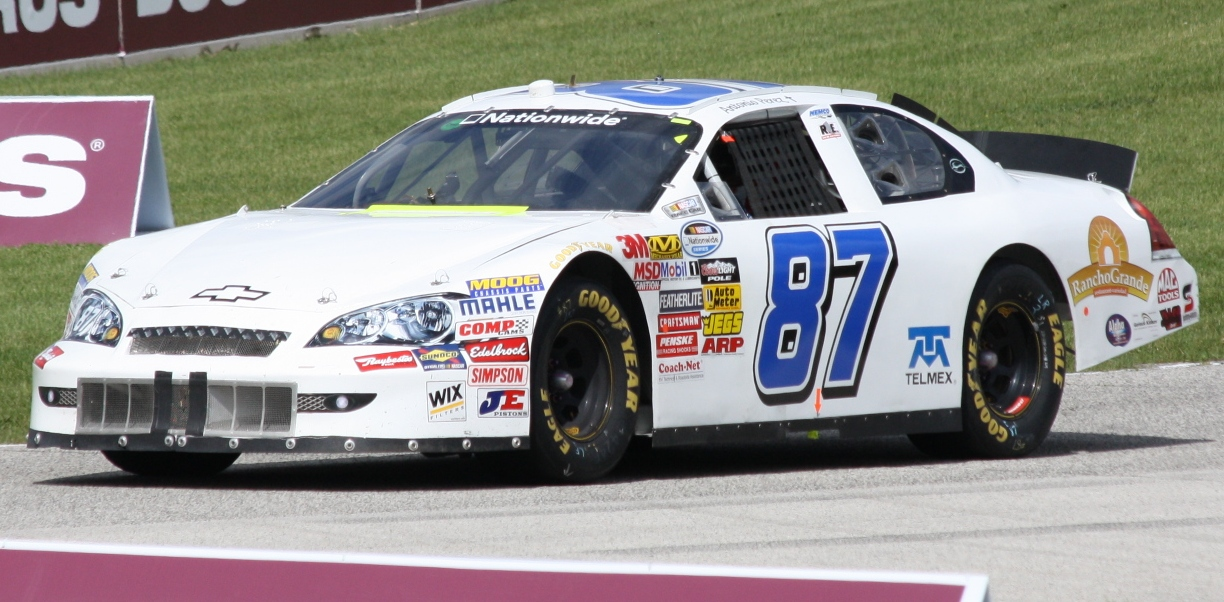
Pérez's No. 87 Nationwide car at Road America

Pérez began racing full-time in the Corona Series in 2006, winning Rookie of the Year honors. The following year, he won his first career race at Autódromo Monterrey. In 2008, he won the series championship.

In 2007, Pérez made his Busch Series debut in the Telcel-Motorola Mexico 200 at Autódromo Hermanos Rodríguez, driving the No. 68 Telmex Dodge. After qualifying 40th, he finished 42nd after suffering a transmission issue on lap two. Pérez returned to the series, then renamed to the Nationwide Series, in 2008 for the Mexico City round, driving the No. 86 Dodge with sponsorship from association football club C.D. Guadalajara.

== Personal life ==
The son of former driver and current politician Antonio Pérez Garibay, Pérez's younger brother Sergio is also a racing driver who currently races in Formula One for Cadillac.

== Motorsports career results ==
=== NASCAR ===
(key) (Bold – Pole position awarded by qualifying time. Italics – Pole position earned by points standings or practice time. * – Most laps led.)

==== Nationwide Series ====
NASCAR Nationwide Series results
| Year | Team | No. | Make | 1 | 2 | 3 | 4 | 5 | 6 | 7 | 8 | 9 | 10 | 11 | 12 | 13 | 14 | 15 | 16 | 17 | 18 | 19 | 20 | 21 | 22 | 23 | 24 | 25 | 26 | 27 | 28 | 29 | 30 | 31 | 32 | 33 | 34 | 35 | NNSC | Pts | Ref |
|---|---|---|---|---|---|---|---|---|---|---|---|---|---|---|---|---|---|---|---|---|---|---|---|---|---|---|---|---|---|---|---|---|---|---|---|---|---|---|---|---|---|
| 2007 | TW Motorsports | 68 | Dodge | DAY | CAL | MXC; 42 | LVS | ATL | BRI | NSH | TEX | PHO | TAL | RCH | DAR | CLT | DOV | NSH | KEN | MLW | NHA | DAY | CHI | GTY | IRP | CGV | GLN | MCH | BRI | CAL | RCH | DOV | KAN | CLT | MEM | TEX | PHO | HOM | 161st | - | |
| 2008 | TW Motorsports | 86 | Dodge | DAY | CAL | LVS | ATL | BRI | NSH | TEX | PHO | MXC; 34 | TAL | RCH | DAR | CLT | DOV | NSH | KEN | MLW | NHA | DAY | CHI | GTY | IRP | CGV | GLN; 37 | MCH | BRI | CAL | RCH | DOV | KAN | CLT | MEM | TEX | PHO | HOM | 114th | 113 | |
| 2009 | TW Motorsports | 86 | Dodge | DAY | CAL | LVS | BRI | TEX | NSH | PHO | TAL | RCH | DAR | CLT | DOV | NSH | KEN | MLW | NHA | DAY | CHI | GTY | IRP | IOW | GLN; 40 | MCH | BRI | CGV; 13 | ATL | RCH | DOV | KAN | CAL | CLT | MEM | TEX | PHO | HOM | 120th | 124 | |
| 2010 | NEMCO Motorsports | 87 | Chevy | DAY | CAL | LVS | BRI | NSH | PHO | TEX | TAL | RCH | DAR | DOV | CLT | NSH | KEN | ROA; 38 | NHA | DAY | CHI | GTY | IRP | IOW | GLN | MCH | BRI | CGV | ATL | RCH | DOV | KAN | CAL | CLT | | | | | 110th | 110 | |
| 2010 | TriStar Motorsports | 35 | Chevy | | | | | | | | | | | | | | | | | | | | | | | | | | | | | | | | GTY; 34 | TEX | PHO | HOM | 110th | 110 | |

==== Camping World East Series ====
NASCAR Camping World East Series results
| Year | Team | No. | Make | 1 | 2 | 3 | 4 | 5 | 6 | 7 | 8 | 9 | 10 | 11 | 12 | 13 | NCWEC | Pts | Ref |
|---|---|---|---|---|---|---|---|---|---|---|---|---|---|---|---|---|---|---|---|
| 2007 | Chivas Racing | 21 | Chevy | GRE | ELK | IOW | SBO | STA | NHA | TMP | NSH | ADI | LRP | MFD; 22 | NHA; 26 | DOV; 27 | 39th | 264 | |
| 2008 | Chivas Racing | 12 | Dodge | GRE | IOW | SBO | **GLN**; 10 | NHA; 26 | TMP | NSH | ADI | LRP | MFD | NHA; 28 | DOV | STA | 38th | 303 | |
| 2009 | Chivas Racing | 12 | Dodge | GRE | TRI; 19 | IOW | SBO | GLN; 20 | NHA | TMP | ADI | LRP | NHA | DOV | | | 41st | 209 | |

=== WeatherTech SportsCar Championship ===
(key)

==== 24 Hours of Daytona ====
24 Hours of Daytona results
| Year | Class | No | Team | Car | Co-drivers | Laps | Position | Class Pos. | Ref |
|---|---|---|---|---|---|---|---|---|---|
| 2016 | GTD | 007 | (United States) The Racer's Group | Aston Martin Vantage GT3 | (Australia) James Davison (Mexico) Ricardo Perez De Lara (United Kingdom) Lars Viljoen | 390 | 44 ^{DNF} | 20 ^{DNF} | |
