= Zaragoza, San Luis Potosí =

Coordinates: 22.0253°N 100.6891°W

Zaragoza
- Municipality and town
- Interactive map of Zaragoza
- Country: Mexico
- State: San Luis Potosí
- Time zone: UTC-6 (Zona Centro)

Zaragoza is a town and municipality in the central Mexican state of San Luis Potosí.
