= Rubén Pardo (racing driver) =

Mexican racing driver

Rubén Pardo Estevez
- Born: June 18, 1979 (age 47); Mexico City, Mexico
- Awards: 1996, 1997, & 1998 Superbikes 600 CC Champions 2000 Dodge Neon Series Champion 2002 Dodge Neon & Truck Champion 2006 Busch East Series Rookie of the Year 2006 Featherlite Most Improved Driver 2006 Hispanic Athlete of the Year

NASCAR O'Reilly Auto Parts Series career
- 7 races run over 3 years
- 2015 position: 117th
- Best finish: 98th (2008)
- First race: 2007 Telcel-Motorola Mexico 200 (Mexico City)
- Last race: 2015 DAV 200 (Phoenix)
Wins	Top tens	Poles
0	0	0

NASCAR FedEx Freight Truck Series career
- 2 races run over 1 year
- 2015 position: 50th
- Best finish: 50th (2015)
- First race: 2015 UNOH 175 (Loudon)
- Last race: 2015 Lucas Oil 150 (Phoenix)
Wins	Top tens	Poles
0	0	0
- Statistics up to date as of November 13, 2015.

Rubén Pardo Estevez (born June 18, 1979) is a Mexican professional stock car racing driver. He currently competes in the NASCAR Mexico Series. He is the brother of fellow NASCAR driver Carlos Pardo, who died in 2009.

== Racing career ==
Pardo began racing in motorcycles, eventually competing in the 600cc Superbikes Series. After three consecutive championships, he started driving stock cars in the Dodge Neon Series, finishing tenth in points for his rookie season. After graduating from college with a degree in marketing, Pardo moved to the NASCAR Mexico Series, finishing second in the championship points behind his brother. He began the 2005 season with two wins when he suffered injuries in a jet ski accident. In his first race back, a pair of fire extinguishers exploded beneath his driving seat, breaking both of his legs. After nearly having his foot amputated, Pardo was able to return to racing later that year, picking up an additional win.

In 2006, Pardo moved to the Busch East Series, where he was named Rookie of the Year, becoming the first Hispanic driver to win a NASCAR-affiliated award. His win in the season-ending race at Lime Rock Park made him the first minority to win a Busch East race. In addition to his full-time run in NASCAR Busch East Series this year, he has run a part-time schedule in the Busch Series. He made his debut in the No. 44 Family Dollar Dodge at Autodromo Hermanos Rodríguez, starting 24th and finishing 41st due to handling problems. His next race came at Nashville Superspeedway, where a vibration forced him out after three laps. He would drive a part-time schedule for Fitz in 2008 in the Nationwide Series.

== Motorsports career results ==
=== NASCAR ===
(key) (Bold – Pole position awarded by qualifying time. Italics – Pole position earned by points standings or practice time. * – Most laps led.)

==== Xfinity Series ====
NASCAR Xfinity Series results
Year	Team	No.	Make	1	2	3	4	5	6	7	8	9	10	11	12	13	14	15	16	17	18	19	20	21	22	23	24	25	26	27	28	29	30	31	32	33	34	35	NXSC	Pts	Ref
2007	Fitz Racing	44	Dodge	DAY	CAL	MXC; 41	LVS	ATL	BRI	NSH; 43	TEX	PHO	TAL	RCH	DAR	CLT	DOV	NSH	KEN	MLW	NHA	DAY	CHI	GTY	IRP	CGV	GLN	MCH	BRI	CAL	RCH	DOV	KAN	CLT	MEM	TEX	PHO	HOM	160th	0	
2008	Jay Robinson Racing	36	Dodge	DAY	CAL	LVS	ATL	BRI	NSH; DNQ	TEX	PHO									MLW; DNQ	NHA	DAY	CHI																98th	186	
2008	Fitz Racing	22	Dodge									MXC; 18	TAL	RCH	DAR; 42	CLT	DOV																						98th	186	
2008	Fitz Racing	36	Dodge															NSH; 42	KEN					GTY; 41	IRP	CGV	GLN	MCH	BRI	CAL	RCH	DOV	KAN	CLT	MEM	TEX	PHO	HOM	98th	186	
2015	MBM Motorsports	13	Toyota	DAY	ATL	LVS	PHO	CAL	TEX	BRI	RCH	TAL	IOW	CLT	DOV	MCH	CHI	DAY	KEN	NHA	IND	IOW	GLN	MOH	BRI	ROA	DAR	RCH	CHI	KEN	DOV	CLT	KAN	TEX	PHO; 38	HOM			117th	0^{1}	

==== Camping World Truck Series ====
NASCAR Camping World Truck Series results
Year	Team	No.	Make	1	2	3	4	5	6	7	8	9	10	11	12	13	14	15	16	17	18	19	20	21	22	23	NCWTC	Pts	Ref
2015	Rick Ware Racing	45	Chevy	DAY	ATL	MAR	KAN	CLT	DOV	TEX	GTW	IOW	KEN	ELD	POC	MCH	BRI	MSP	CHI	NHA; 21	LVS	TAL	MAR	TEX			50th	50	
2015	Rick Ware Racing	1	Chevy																						PHO; 17	HOM	50th	50	
