= El Marqués =

El Marqués, Querétaro, Mexico
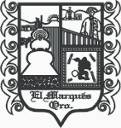
Coat of arms
Latitude	20.31° N
Longitude	100.09° W
Municipal president	Enrique Vega Carriles (PAN)
Area	787.4 km^{2}
Population (2020)	231,668
HDI (2020)	0.743
Time zone (UTC)	-6 UTC CST
GDP (per capita) (2021)	US$3.411,00
Official website: http://www.elmarques.gob.mx

El Marqués is a municipality in the Mexican state of Querétaro. It receives its name from Juan Antonio de Urrutia y Arana, the Marquis of the Villa del Villar del Águila, who built the aqueduct that supplied water to Querétaro for centuries. Its seat is the city of La Cañada. It forms part of the metropolitan area of Querétaro and has many state-of-the-art industrial parks and Querétaro International Airport.
