= Carlos Pardo =

Mexican racing driver (1975–2009)

- Pardo in 2008
- Born: September 15, 1975; Mexico City, Mexico
- Died: June 14, 2009 (aged 33); Autódromo Miguel E. Abed; Amozoc, Puebla, Mexico
- Cause of death: Racing accident
- Achievements: 2004 NASCAR Corona Series Champion

NASCAR O'Reilly Auto Parts Series career
- 1 race run over 1 year
- Best finish: 143rd (2006)
- First race: 2006 Telcel-Motorola 200 (Mexico City)
Wins	Top tens	Poles
0	0	0

Carlos Alberto Pardo Estévez (September 15, 1975 – June 14, 2009) was a Mexican stock car racing driver from Mexico City. He was the first driver to win the NASCAR Mexico Corona Series championship.

== Career ==
Pardo won ten of his 74 NASCAR Mexico Corona Series starts and had eight poles. He won the championship in 2004. He was third in standings in 2005 and 2006. Pardo also competed in six races in the NASCAR Camping World Series East in 2004 and 2005 and raced in the NASCAR Nationwide Series at Autódromo Hermanos Rodriguez in 2006.

== Death ==
Pardo was killed in an accident which occurred on the 97th lap of a 100-lap NASCAR Mexico Corona Series race at Autódromo Miguel E. Abed in Amozoc, Puebla, on June 14, 2009. As Pardo led the field with just four laps remaining, Jorge Goeters attempted to overtake Pardo going into turn 3. Pardo attempted to block Goeters, but came into contact with the front of Goeters' car. Pardo's car spun down the track and collided side-on with the edge of a concrete retaining wall at over 200 km/h (120 mph). Even with water drums (Fitch barrier) in place to soften any collision, the car disintegrated upon impact. Pardo was transported to a nearby hospital by helicopter, where he was pronounced dead. He was declared the winner of the race as he was leading the race at the last completed lap before the accident occurred, beating Goeters by 0.044 seconds. Pardo, driving for Motorcraft team, had started the race from the last row.

Pardo's brother Rubén also competed in the NASCAR Mexico Corona Series, and finished sixth in the race that his brother won posthumously.

== Motorsports career results ==
=== NASCAR ===
(key) (Bold – Pole position awarded by qualifying time. Italics – Pole position earned by points standings or practice time. * – Most laps led.)

==== Busch Series ====
NASCAR Busch Series results
Year	Team	No.	Make	1	2	3	4	5	6	7	8	9	10	11	12	13	14	15	16	17	18	19	20	21	22	23	24	25	26	27	28	29	30	31	32	33	34	35	NBSC	Pts	Ref
2006	Frank Cicci Racing	34	Chevy	DAY	CAL	MXC; 42	LVS	ATL	BRI	TEX	NSH	PHO	TAL	RCH	DAR	CLT	DOV	NSH	KEN	MLW	DAY	CHI	NHA	MAR	GTY	IRP	GLN	MCH	BRI	CAL	RCH	DOV	KAN	CLT	MEM	TEX	PHO	HOM	143rd	37	

==== Busch East Series ====
Busch East Series results
Year	Team	No.	Make	1	2	3	4	5	6	7	8	9	10	11	12	13	NBESC	Pts	Ref
2005	Lori Williams Racing	21	Chevy	STA	HOL	ERI	NHA	WFD	ADI; 11	STA	DUB; 11	OXF	NHA	DOV	LRP	TMP	42nd	260	
2006	Lori Williams Racing	21	Chevy	GRE	STA	HOL; 15	TMP	ERI; 12	NHA	ADI; 15	WFD	NHA; 39	DOV; DNQ	LRP			29th	440	

==== West Series ====
NASCAR West Series results
Year	Team	No.	Make	1	2	3	4	5	6	7	8	9	10	11	12	13	NWSC	Pts	Ref
2004	Unknown	03	Chevy	PHO	MMR	CAL	S99	EVG	IRW	S99	RMR	DCS	PHO	CNS	MMR	IRW; DNQ	68th	79	

Sporting positions
Preceded by First season	Desafío Corona Champion; 2004	Succeeded by Jorge Goeters
