= Trióvalo Internacional de Cajititlán =

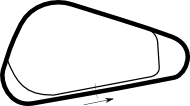
- Oval (1986–present)
- Location: Tlajomulco de Zúñiga, Jalisco
- Coordinates: 20°26′46″N 103°16′9″W
- Opened: 31 August 1986; 39 years ago
- Former names: Trióvalo Bernardo Obregón (1999–2017)
- Major events: Former: NASCAR Mexico Series (2004–2010, 2017–2019, 2021–2022)

Oval (1986–present)
- Surface: Asphalt
- Length: 1.351 km (0.839 mi)
- Turns: 3

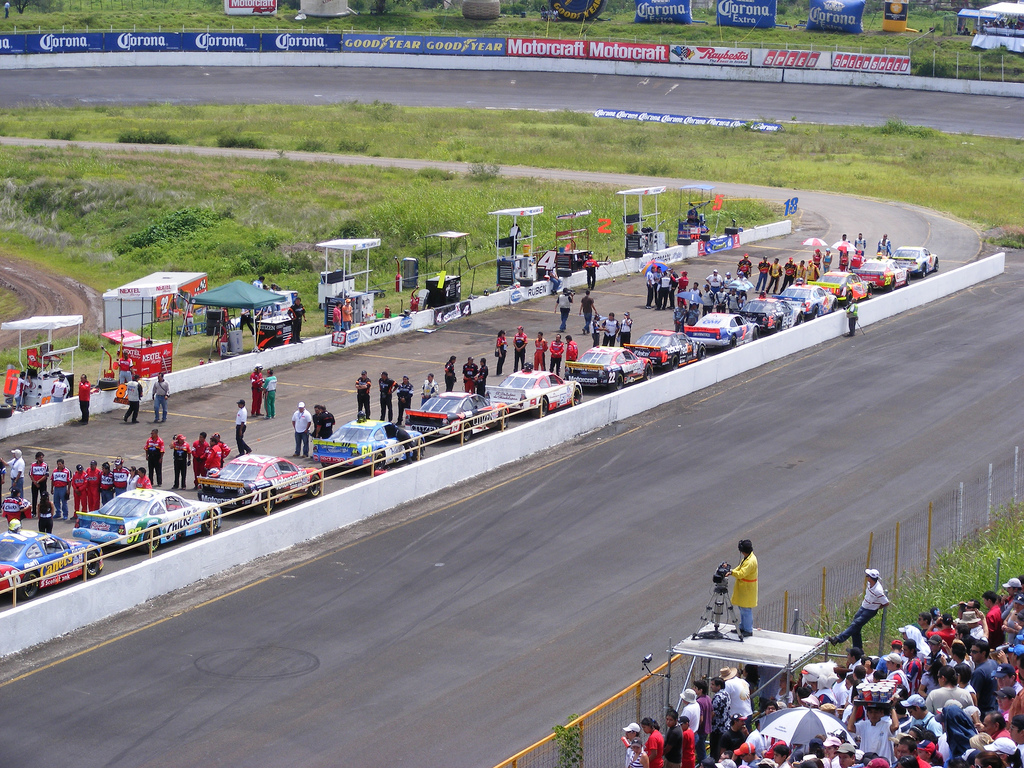
Pitlane during a NASCAR Corona Series race in 2008

Trióvalo Internacional de Cajititlán (formerly Trióvalo Bernardo Obregón) is a three-quarter-mile tri-oval racetrack located in Tlajomulco de Zúñiga, Jalisco, Mexico, near the Laguna de Cajititlán and Guadalajara International Airport, in the Guadalajara metropolitan area.

The track was renamed after the driver Bernardo Obregón Tamaríz who died in the Carrera Panamericana in 1999 during the Mil Cumbres Stage.

The tri-oval was the venue for NASCAR Corona Series races from 2004 to 2010. For the 2011 season, the track was excluded for NASCAR schedule because of the damage in the track.

By 2013, the track became in complete dismay, The track surface is unusable as a motorsports venue without being resurfaced and the stands are unsafe for spectators after sitting unused and not maintained since late 2010.

Trióvalo Bernardo Obregón officially announced its return in March 2017, confirming that NASCAR Mexico took place in the venue June 2–4, 2017.

The trioval also hosted the important Copa Occidente in April, 2017.

In 2017, the track was renovated with advice from Mexican racing drivers including Michel Jourdain Sr. and renamed Trióvalo Internacional de Cajititlán.
