= Rogelio López =

Mexican racing driver (born 1980)

Rogelio López III
- Born: July 29, 1980 (age 46) Aguascalientes, Mexico

NASCAR Corona Series career
- Debut season: 2004
- Current team: MexicanaGO
- Car number: 60
- Wins: 18

Previous series
- 2008: NASCAR Camping World East Series

Championship titles
- 2006: NASCAR Corona Series

NASCAR O'Reilly Auto Parts Series career
- 2 races run over 2 years
- Best finish: 123rd (2006)
- First race: 2006 Telcel-Motorola 200 (Mexico City)
- Last race: 2007 Telcel-Motorola 200 (Mexico City)
Wins	Top tens	Poles
0	0	0
- Statistics up to date as of January 10, 2011.

Rogelio López III (born July 29, 1980) is a Mexican former racing driver from Aguascalientes.

López won the 2006 Desafío Coronachampionship, and went to the United States to drive the No. 03 Telmex/Lucas Oil Dodge in the NASCAR Grand National Division, Busch East Series for the 2007 season.

López got his first win in the Busch East Series during his rookie season, winning on July 21, 2007, at the Music City Motorplex in Nashville. He eventually went on to finish seventh in the standings with one win, five top-five finishes, and six top-ten finishes.

López has two NASCAR Nationwide Series starts, both of them at Mexico City, in 2006 and 2007. He finished 29th on both occasions.

López competed in the 2007 Toyota All-Star Showdown, earning a 13th-place finish.

López is most famous for his 2006 blow-over in the NASCAR West Series at California Speedway in Fontana, California. While racing with Johnny Borneman, the two made contact coming out of turn 2. López's car went airborne and flipped over. His car slid on its roof for several hundred feet before flipping over back onto the wheels. López was uninjured and walked away from the incident.

López returned to make eight starts in the NASCAR Camping World East Series in 2008 and finished 21st in points. That same year, he became NASCAR México champion.

On March 20, 2025, López announced his retirement from racing.

== Motorsports career results ==
=== NASCAR ===
(key) (Bold – Pole position awarded by qualifying time. Italics – Pole position earned by points standings or practice time. * – Most laps led.)

==== Busch Series ====
NASCAR Busch Series results
Year	Team	No.	Make	1	2	3	4	5	6	7	8	9	10	11	12	13	14	15	16	17	18	19	20	21	22	23	24	25	26	27	28	29	30	31	32	33	34	35	NBSC	Pts	Ref
2006	Tom Eriksen Racing	67	Dodge	DAY	CAL	MXC; 29	LVS	ATL	BRI	TEX	NSH	PHO	TAL	RCH	DAR	CLT	DOV	NSH	KEN	MLW	DAY	CHI	NHA	MAR	GTY	IRP	GLN	MCH	BRI	CAL	RCH	DOV	KAN	CLT	MEM	TEX	PHO	HOM	123rd	76	
2007	Tom Eriksen Racing	67	Dodge	DAY	CAL	MXC; 29	LVS	ATL	BRI	NSH	TEX	PHO	TAL	RCH	DAR	CLT	DOV	NSH	KEN	MLW	NHA	DAY	CHI	GTY	IRP	CGV	GLN	MCH	BRI	CAL	RCH	DOV	KAN	CLT	MEM	TEX	PHO	HOM	136th	76	

==== Autozone West Series ====
NASCAR Autozone West Series results
Year	Team	No.	Make	1	2	3	4	5	6	7	8	9	10	11	12	NAWSC	Pts	Ref
2006	Dave Davis	03	Chevy	PHO	PHO	S99	IRW	SON	DCS	IRW	EVG	S99	CAL; 22	CTS	AMP	73rd	97	

Sporting positions
Preceded by Jorge Goeters	Desafío Corona Champion; 2006	Succeeded by Rafael Martínez
