= 2013 NASCAR Toyota Series =

Seasons
- ← 2012 2014 →

The 2013 NASCAR Toyota Series was the seventh season of the NASCAR Toyota Series, and the tenth organized by NASCAR Mexico. The season was composed by fifteen races. For first time, the series raced outside of Mexico, with a race in the Phoenix International Raceway. Jorge Goeters returned as reigning champion, and took part in the 2013 UNOH Battle at the Beach. Rodrigo Peralta was the champion of 2013 season and Santiago Tovar was declared the Rookie of the Year.

== Changes ==
=== Desafio ===
After ten races the Top-8 championship drivers and 2 wild card drivers were selected for a five-race "Chase system".

== Teams and drivers ==
Manufacturer	Team	No.	Race Driver	Crew Chief
Chevrolet	Telmex	1	Antonio Pérez	Xristos Pappas
Chevrolet	Ramírez Racing	08	José Luis Ramírez	José Ramón Blasco
Chevrolet		77	Rafael Vallina	Edgard Romano
Dodge	Telcel	2	Luis Felipe Montaño	Mario Muñoz
Toyota	Marban Racing	00	Rodrigo Marbán	Jesús Gerardo Aguilera
Toyota	Telcel	3	Daniel Suárez	Rafael Vega
Toyota		4	Jorge Goeters	Humberto Castilla
Toyota	SC Racing	05	Abraham Calderón	Jorge Christian Torres
Toyota	Telmex	5	Rubén Rovelo	Alejandro Vega
Toyota	2b Racing	7	Carlos Peralta	Joe Pérez
Toyota	2b Racing	8	Freddy Tame, Jr.	Víctor Trejo
Toyota	Tame Racing	9	Elliot Van Rankin	Antonio Camacho
Toyota	HO Racing	11	Hugo Oliveras	Rafael Oliveras
Toyota	HO Racing	15	Rubén Pardo	Bruno Pineda
Toyota	HO Racing	48	Rogelio López	Asencion Jiménez
Toyota	H&High Speed	20	Homero Richards	Juan Luis Quintanar
Toyota	H&High Speed	29	Héctor Aguirre	Jorge Luis Coapio
Toyota		26	Israel Jaitovich	Rolando González
Toyota		30	Víctor Barrales	Rafael Hernández
Toyota	Escudería Suspensión y Dirección	34	Óscar Ruíz De Azua	Roberto Meneses
Toyota	Escudería Suspensión y Dirección	43	Patrick Goeters	José Valentín Fernández
Toyota		36	Pepe Montaño	Jorge Miguel Garibay
Toyota		40	Héctor Félix	David Tame
Toyota		46	Irwin Vences	Alfredo González
Mazda	Team GP	18	Rafael Martínez	Martín Bautista
Mazda	Team GP	88	Rubén García, Jr.	Cuauhtémoc González

== Schedule ==
In 2013, Phoenix International Raceway was added to the schedule, marking the first event in Toyota Series history to be held in the United States. All the Mexican venues of 2012 season returned, and three races were held at night (Phoenix, Mexico City and Chihuahua). A 2nd race at El Dorado Speedway (Chihuahua) was supposed to be run at September 29 but was later cancelled and replaced by Autódromo Chiapas.

No.	Race title	Track	Date
1	Toyota 120‡	(Arizona) Phoenix International Raceway, Avondale	1 March
2	Potosina 200	(San Luis Potosí) Autódromo Potosino, Zaragoza	24 March
3	Mexico Fest 240‡	Autódromo Hermanos Rodríguez, Mexico City	6 April
4	Queretana 200	Autódromo Querétaro, El Marqués	21 April
5	Chihuahua 200‡	(Chihuahua (state)) El Dorado Speedway, Chihuahua	11 May
6	Aguascalientes 240	Autódromo Internacional de Aguascalientes, Aguascalientes	26 May
7	Puebla 240	Autódromo Miguel E. Abed, Puebla	16 June
8	Regia 200	(Nuevo León) Autódromo Monterrey, Apodaca	30 June
9	Queretana 200	Autódromo Querétaro, El Marqués	28 July
10	Mexico Fest 240	Autódromo Hermanos Rodríguez, Mexico City	11 August
11	Potosina 200	(San Luis Potosí) Autódromo Potosino, Zaragoza	25 August
12	Puebla 240	(Puebla) Autódromo Miguel E. Abed, Amozoc	8 September
13	Aguascalientes 240	Autódromo Internacional de Aguascalientes, Aguascalientes	13 October
14	Tuxtla 240	Autódromo Chiapas, Berriozábal	27 October
15	Mexico Final 200	Autódromo Hermanos Rodríguez, Mexico City	10 November

Oval
Road Course

‡ Night Race

== Results and standings ==
=== Races ===
No.	Race	Pole position	Most laps led	Winning driver	Manufacturer
1	Toyota 120	Jorge Goeters	Abraham Calderón	Abraham Calderón	Toyota
2	Potosina 200	Antonio Pérez	Homero Richards	Homero Richards	Toyota
3	Mexico Fest 240	Antonio Pérez	Antonio Pérez	Héctor Aguirre	Toyota
4	Queretana 200	Daniel Suárez	Homero Richards	Rafael Martínez	Mazda
5	Chihuahua 240	Daniel Suárez	Daniel Suárez	Daniel Suárez	Toyota
6	Aguascalientes 240	Rubén García, Jr.	Rubén García, Jr.	Rubén García, Jr.	Mazda
7	Puebla 240	Carlos Contreras	Rafael Martínez	Rafael Martínez	Mazda
8	Regia 200	Homero Richards	Homero Richards	Daniel Suárez	Toyota
9	Queretana 200	José Luis Ramírez	Antonio Pérez	Rafael Martínez	Mazda
10	México Fest 240	Carlos Peralta	Irwin Vences	Irwin Vences	Toyota
11	Potosina 200	Antonio Pérez	Antonio Pérez	Antonio Pérez	Chevrolet
12	Puebla 240	Rafael Martínez	Patrick Goeters	Patrick Goeters	Toyota
13	Aguascalientes 240	Patrick Goeters	Daniel Suárez	Rodrigo Peralta	Ford
14	Tuxtla 240	Daniel Suárez	Antonio Pérez	José Luis Ramírez	Chevrolet
15	Mexico Final 200	Daniel Suárez	Daniel Suárez	Daniel Suárez	Toyota

=== Drivers ===
(key) Bold – Pole position awarded by time. Italics – Pole position set by final practice results. * – Most laps led. ** – All laps led.

Pos.	Driver	PHO	SLP	MXC	QRO	CHI	AGS	PUE	MTY	QRO	MXC	SLP	PUE	AGS	TXG	MXC	Points
1	Rodrigo Peralta		16	7	5	10	7	2	6	16	2	8	5	1	11	4	1198
2	Daniel Suárez	11	9	6	**4**	**1***	27	33	1	26	29	10	2	2*	**24***	**1***	1190
3	Rubén Pardo	4	2	8	17	2	16	31	7	2	10	7	22	6	6	3	1177
4	Rubén García, Jr.	3	7	9	6	18	**1***	25	8	7	11	6	8	19	10	5	1176
5	Homero Richards	5	1*	29	2*	31	21	6	**22***	8	34	3	4	30	8	7	1169
6	Antonio Pérez	2	**4**	**2***	3	16	2	24	25	3*	3	**1****	31*	25	2	2	1167
7	Hugo Oliveras	10	12	14	9	5	15	5	28	4	7	17	10	5	5	22	1161
8	Rafael Martínez	22	33	11	1	14	6	1*	17	1	13	2	28	3	25	14	1159
9	José Luis Ramírez	26	6	5	30	4	9	11	3	**10**	5	30	3	26	1	10	1155
10	Rubén Rovelo	14	24	10	7	3	3	3	26	5	8	19	6	22		20	1110
Desafío cut-off
Pos.	Driver	PHO	SLP	MXC	QRO	CHI	AGS	PUE	MTY	QRO	MXC	SLP	PUE	AGS	TXG	MXC	Points
11	Freddy Tame, Jr.	13	5	17	10	15	28	14	11	17	14	12	15	10	15	19	447
12	Héctor Aguirre	25	29	1	16	25	5	7	20	11	12	20	23	12	13	8	439
13	Abraham Calderón	1*	28	3	8	6	30	28	29	9	4	14	9	7	18	9	432
14	Patrick Goeters	7	11	19	32	17	11	9	32	27	27	16	1	**8**	4	15	431
15	Rogelio López	21	27	12	31	23	4	35	18	6	6	5	7	4	26	6	430
16	Irwin Vences	8	10	16	29	8	13	23	2	31	1*	4	27	35	3	30	423
17	Carlos Peralta	6	26	21	11	9	14	10	31	18	**16**	27	14	11	12	17	419
18	Jorge Goeters	**9**	19	27	19	7	10	4	4	28	31	9	26	28	27	11	403
19	Oscar Ruíz De Azua	24	8	13	25	22	18	19	5	13	9	11	32	15	31	32	383
20	Pepe Montaño	15	30	15	14	24	20	27	10	15	25	26	25	13	9	16	376
21	Elliot Van Rankin	19	21	33	15	19	19	29	24	12	28	28	12	9	7	25	361
22	Héctor Félix	16	20	20	20	13	12	16		23	17	31	17	16	20	18	357
23	Santiago Tovar **(R)**		DNQ^{2}	28	22	32	17	12	12	32	15	15	21	20	14	12	328
24	Rodrigo Marbán	18	25	25	26	20	31	22	23	24	24	21	19	21	19	23	319
25	Víctor Barrales	20	34	32		27	23	15	14	21	21	18	20	14	33	37	297
26	Israel Jaitovich	23	22	24	27	26	25	17	19	22	20	32	24	33	23	35	288
27	Carlos Contreras		3	34	13	30	33	**8**	9	34	30	23	11	34	30	36	280
28	Rafael Vallina	17	32	23	34	21	29	32	13	20	18	25	18	31	28		275
29	Javier Fernández		17	22	28	33	24	20	15		23	22	29	27	29	27	256
30	Luis Felipe Montaño	12	13	4	18	11	8	30	27	14						28	254
31	Jorge Contreras, Jr.		14	30	12		22		33	19		29	30	32	17	13	233
32	Oscar Torres, Jr.		18	26	21	28	32	13	21	25		13				21	222
33	Héctor González		DNQ^{2}		33	34		21	16	29			16	24		31	157
34	Jim Nides					12	34	34			35	EX		12	32	33	129
35	Enrique Contreras III													17	16	26	73
36	Carlos Azcarate											24		29	22	29	72
37	Oscar Peralta		31	18	23											34	70
38	Xavier Razo						26	26		33	33	34					68
39	Rubén García Novoa									30			13	23			66
40	Julian Islas		23	31							26				21		65
41	Enrique Baca				24	29			30								49
42	Jorge Seman							18			32						38
43	Eduardo Goeters										19						25
44	Mike Sánchez										22						22
45	Alejandro Capin															24	20
46	Waldemar Coronas		15^{1}														19
Pos.	Driver	PHO	SLP	MXC	QRO	CHI	AGS	PUE	MTY	QRO	MXC	SLP	PUE	AGS	TXG	MXC	Points

Notes

- ^{1} – Waldemar Coronas suffered a 10-point penalty.
- ^{2} – Santiago Tovar and Héctor González received championship points, despite the fact that they did not qualify for the race.

== See also ==
- 2013 NASCAR Sprint Cup Series
- 2013 NASCAR Nationwide Series
- 2013 NASCAR Camping World Truck Series
- 2013 NASCAR K&N Pro Series East
- 2013 NASCAR K&N Pro Series West
- 2013 NASCAR Whelen Modified Tour
- 2013 NASCAR Whelen Southern Modified Tour
- 2013 ARCA Racing Series
- 2013 NASCAR Canadian Tire Series
- 2013 NASCAR Whelen Euro Series
