= 2015 NASCAR Mexico Series =

Seasons
- ← 2014 2017 →

The 2015 NASCAR Mexico Series was the ninth season of the NASCAR Mexico Series, and the twelfth organized by NASCAR Mexico. On January 13, 2015, the NASCAR México Series presented by FOX Sports 3 announced that its entitlement sponsorship with Toyota stopped in 2015 after three years. It began with the Toyota 120 at Phoenix International Raceway on March 13, and ended with the RedCo 240 at Autódromo Chiapas, on November 22. Abraham Calderón entered the season as the defending Drivers' Champion. Rubén García, Jr. won the championship, eighteen points in front of Rubén Rovelo.

== Drivers ==
No.	Manufacturer	Car Owner	Race Driver	Crew Chief
00	Chevrolet	Patricia Marbán	Rodrigo Marbán	Rolando González
0	Chevrolet	Rafael Vallina	Rafael Vallina 14	Octavio Reyes
01	Toyota	Israel Jaitovich	Israel Jaitovich 10	TBA
1	Toyota	Jimmy Morales	Antonio Pérez	Xristtos Pappas
2	Toyota	Mónica Morales	Abraham Calderón	Alejandro Vega
6	Ford	Priscila Palazuelos	Rogelio López	Carlos Guzman
7	Toyota	Marcela Peralta	Carlos Peralta 2	Antonio Camacho
08	Ford 1	Jose Luis Ramírez Magaña	José Luis Ramírez 2	José Luis Ramírez Cueto
08	Chevrolet 1	Jose Luis Ramírez Magaña	José Luis Ramírez 2	José Luis Ramírez Cueto
8	Toyota 3	Antonio Camacho	Freddy Tame Jr. 4	Victor Izquierdo
8	Ford 1	Antonio Camacho	Freddy Tame Jr. 4	Victor Izquierdo
9	Ford	David Tame	Jim Nides 14	David Tame
9	Ford	David Tame	Rubén García Novoa 1	David Tame
11	Toyota	Juan Salazar	Hugo Oliveras	Luis Ruiz
12	Ford	Anapaula Villegas Peralta	Elliot Van Rankin 3	TBA
14	Ford	Carlos Contreras	Kevin O'Connell (R) 1	Miguel Lora
15	Toyota	Rafael Oliveras	Rubén Pardo	Bruno Pineda
16	Chevrolet	Israel Rincon Gonzalez	Mike Sánchez 2	TBA
18	Toyota	Ramiro Fidalgo	Rafael Martínez	Martin Bautisa
20	Ford 2	Homero Richards	Homero Richards	Jose Luis Alvarado
20	Toyota 13	Homero Richards	Homero Richards	Jose Luis Alvarado
22	Ford	Luis A. Tame Lamborn	Alejandro González (R) 2	TBA
23	Ford	Allan van Rankin	Santiago Tovar	Jorge Gerardo González
24	Ford	Denisse Guaida	Rodrigo Peralta	Edgar Romano
28	Chevrolet 1	Juan Carlos Gonzalez	Rubén Rovelo	Julio Cesar Pereira
28	Dodge 14	Juan Carlos Gonzalez	Rubén Rovelo	Julio Cesar Pereira
29	Ford	Carlos Azcarate	Carlos Azcarate 4	Carlos Machorro
30	Chevrolet	Víctor Barrales	Víctor Barrales	Rafael Hernández
31	Chevrolet	Alejandro Goeters	Jorge Goeters 14	Alejandro Goeters
33	Ford	Isaac Aragón	Giovanni Rodrigo (R) 1	TBA
36	Toyota	Angélica Patiño	Pepe Montaño 9	TBA
37	Toyota 7	Pedro A. Rojas	Pepe González 12	TBA
37	Ford 5	Pedro A. Rojas	Pepe González 12	TBA
46	Ford	Jordi Vidal	Irwin Vences	Omar Galicia
58	Ford	Liliana Castellano	Jorge Contreras Jr.	Victor Villanueva
68	Ford	Horacio Richards del Río	Manolín Gutiérrez (R)	Ubaldo Jimenez
69	Chevrolet 6	Javier Fernández	Javier Fernández 8	Valentin Fernández
69	Ford 2	Javier Fernández	Javier Fernández 8	Valentin Fernández
77	Ford	Enrique Contreras	Enrique Contreras III 14	Humberto Castilla
87	Toyota	Estefanía Oliveras	Luis Felipe Montaño	Rafael Oliveras
88	Toyota	Juan Pablo García	Rubén García Jr.	Cuahtemoc González
96	Chevrolet	Alejandro Hernández	Oscar Torres Jr. 6	José Guadalupe Bernal

== Schedule ==
The full schedule for the 2015 season was released on January 15, 2015.

No.	Race title	Track	Date
1	Toyota 120	(Arizona) Phoenix International Raceway, Avondale	March 13
2	Potosina 200	(San Luis Potosí) Autódromo Potosino, Zaragoza	April 12
3	RedCo 240	Autódromo Chiapas, Tuxtla Gutiérrez	April 26
4	Queretana 200	(Querétaro) Autódromo del Ecocentro de la Unión Ganadera, El Marqués	May 17
5	Puebla 240	Autódromo Miguel E. Abed, Puebla	May 31
6	Hidro Calida 240	Autódromo Internacional de Aguascalientes, Aguascalientes	June 14
7	Coca-Cola Zero 240	(Chihuahua (state)) El Dorado Speedway, Chihuahua	June 28
8	Potosina 200	(San Luis Potosí) Autódromo Potosino, Zaragoza	July 12
9	Amozoc 240	Autódromo Miguel E. Abed, Puebla	August 30
10	HAAS CNC 200	(San Luis Potosí) Autódromo Potosino, Zaragoza	September 13
Desafío cut-off
11	Coca-Cola Zero 240	(Chihuahua (state)) El Dorado Speedway, Chihuahua	October 4
12	Desafío Deportivo 240	Autódromo Internacional de Aguascalientes, Aguascalientes	October 18
13	Red Cola 240	Autódromo Hermanos Rodríguez, Mexico City	November 7
14	Alcatel OneTouch 240	Autódromo Hermanos Rodríguez, Mexico City	November 8
15	RedCo 240	Autódromo Chiapas, Tuxtla Gutiérrez	November 22

== Results and standings ==
=== Races ===
No.	Race	Pole position	Most laps led	Winning driver	Manufacturer
1	Toyota 120	Rubén Pardo	Rubén Pardo	Rubén Pardo	Toyota
2	Potosina 200	Oscar Torres Jr.	Rubén Rovelo	Rubén Rovelo	Dodge
3	RedCo 240	Rubén García Jr.	Hugo Oliveras	Rubén Rovelo	Dodge
4	Queretana 200	Rodrigo Peralta	Rodrigo Peralta	Rodrigo Peralta	Ford
5	Puebla 240	Luis Felipe Montaño^{1}	Irwin Vences	Irwin Vences	Ford
6	Hidro Calida 240	Rubén García Jr.	Santiago Tovar	Santiago Tovar	Ford
7	Coca-Cola Zero 240	Rafael Martínez	Rubén García Jr.	Rubén García Jr.	Toyota
8	Potosina 200	Rubén García Jr.	Irwin Vences	Irwin Vences	Ford
9	Amozoc 240	Homero Richards	Homero Richards	Irwin Vences	Ford
10	HAAS CNC 200	Irwin Vences^{2}	Rubén Rovelo	Rubén Rovelo	Dodge
Desafío cut-off
11	Coca-Cola Zero 240	Irwin Vences^{3}	Rubén García Jr.	Rubén García Jr.	Toyota
12	Desafío Deportivo 240	Rubén García Jr.	Rogelio López	Rogelio López	Ford
13	Red Cola 240	Santiago Tovar	Rubén Rovelo	Rubén García Jr.	Toyota
14	Alcatel OneTouch 240	Santiago Tovar	Homero Richards	Pepe González	Ford
15	RedCo 240	Rafael Martínez	Rogelio López	Rogelio López	Ford

Notes

- ^{1} – The qualifying session for the Puebla 240 was cancelled due to heavy rain. The starting line-up was decided by championship points.
- ^{2} – The qualifying session for the HAAS CNC 200 was cancelled due to heavy rain. The starting line-up was decided by championship points.
- ^{3} – The qualifying session for the Coca-Cola Zero 240 was cancelled due to heavy rain. The starting line-up was decided by championship points.

=== Drivers' championship ===
(key) (Bold – Pole position awarded by qualifying time. Italics – Pole position earned by points standings or practice time. * – Most laps led.)

. – Eliminated after Coca-Cola Zero 240 (First Desafío-race)
. – Eliminated after Desafío Deportivo 240 (Second Desafío-race)
. – Eliminated after Red Cola 240 (Third Desafío-race)
. – Eliminated after Alcatel OneTouch 240 (Penultimate Desafío-race)

Pos.	Driver	PHO	SLP	TUX	QRO	PUE	AGS	CHI	SLP	PUE	SLP	CHI	AGS	MXC	MXC	TUX	Points
1	Rubén García Jr.	10	4	**5**	8	21	**11**	1*	**5**	15	8	1*	**4**	1	10	5	1213
2	Rubén Rovelo	26	1*	1	10	3	2	7	2	3	1*	8	3	6*	8	14	1195
3	Rodrigo Peralta	23	10	29	**1***	20	6	4	7	7	14	6	5	15	7	3	1186
4	Rafael Martínez	14	2	16	28	13	9	**6**	15	9	4	3	7	2	21	**18**	1171
Desafío cut-off
Pos.	Driver	PHO	SLP	TUX	QRO	PUE	AGS	CHI	SLP	PUE	SLP	CHI	AGS	MXC	MXC	TUX	Points
5	Irwin Vences	8	3	3	9	1*	8	2	1*	1	5	**7**	13	12	16	17	573
6	Rubén Pardo	**1***	6	6	24	2	3	3	13	8	20	20	9	4	6	2	546
7	Luis Felipe Montaño	2	8	2	4	16	22	5	8	14	6	13	16	3	9	4	530
8	Rogelio López	4	28	8	5	4	10	12	11	4	3	17	1*	14	22	1*	529
9	Homero Richards	15	19	9	7	9	5	17	14	**2***	2	4	6	21	4*	8	512
10	Hugo Oliveras	3	25	4*	2	6	4	20	19	12	9	5	2	20	11	20	494
11	Santiago Tovar	25	29	23	3	5	1*	13	4	16	18	11	12	**11**	**3**	6	488
12	Antonio Pérez	20	7	14	23	10	15	10	3	11	13	10	10	16	17	7	477
13	Abraham Calderón	6	27	10	6	7	12	8	12	20	23	2	11	19	23	19	458
14	Jorge Contreras Jr.	24	9	20	19	22	13	14	17	10	10	14	8	13	2	9	458
15	Manolín Gutiérrez **(R)**	9	30	15	11	25	7	9	24	6	16	12	14	5	13	15	449
16	Enrique Contreras III	11	14	7	16	12	14	24	9	13	11	9	15	18	18	EX	425
17	Rodrigo Marbán	16	17	12	14	18	17	15	16	17	15	18	19	17	19	12	418
18	Jorge Goeters	7	5	25	12	8	18	11	6	22	21		22	23	5	16	407
19	Víctor Barrales	27	16	21	20	15	16	18	20	24	19	16	20	9	15	13	391
20	Jim Nides	17	22	11	25	19	21	19	23	18	22		17	10	12	10	371
21	Rafael Vallina	22	11	18	15	14	20	22	18	25	77	19	21	24	20		360
22	Pepe González		26	22	21	23	25	16	10	23	17	15		7	1		316
23	Israel Jaitovich		23	17				23	21	19	12	DNQ^{1}	18	25		21	239
24	Pepe Montaño		15	27	17	17	19	21	22	21	24						213
25	Javier Fernández	28	24	28	18	24	23							8	14		185
26	Oscar Torres Jr.	21	**13**	13	22	11	24										160
27	Freddy Tame Jr.	12	20	26	27												91
28	Carlos Azcarate	19	21	19	26												91
29	Elliot Van Rankin		18	24	13												77
30	José Luis Ramírez	5								5							69
31	Carlos Peralta	13	12														63
32	Alejandro González **(R)**														24	11	53
33	Mike Sánchez		31												25		32
34	Kevin O'Connell **(R)**	18															26
35	Rubén García Novoa											21					23
36	Giovanni Rodrigo **(R)**													22			22
Pos.	Driver	PHO	SLP	TUX	QRO	PUE	AGS	CHI	SLP	PUE	SLP	CHI	AGS	MXC	MXC	TUX	Points

Notes

- ^{1} – Israel Jaitovich received championship points, despite the fact that he did not qualify for the race.

== See also ==
- 2015 NASCAR Sprint Cup Series
- 2015 NASCAR Xfinity Series
- 2015 NASCAR Camping World Truck Series
- 2015 NASCAR K&N Pro Series East
- 2015 NASCAR K&N Pro Series West
- 2015 NASCAR Whelen Modified Tour
- 2015 NASCAR Whelen Southern Modified Tour
- 2015 NASCAR Canadian Tire Series
- 2015 NASCAR Whelen Euro Series
