= 2017 NASCAR PEAK Mexico Series =

The 2017 NASCAR PEAK Mexico Series was the tenth season of the NASCAR PEAK Mexico Series and the thirteenth season organized by NASCAR Mexico. The series returned after one-year hiatus. It was the first season with PEAK as the series' title sponsor. It began with the Difrenosa 120 at Autódromo Monterrey on March 26 and concluded with the Gran Premio FedEx at Autódromo Hermanos Rodríguez on November 12. Rubén García Jr. entered the season as the defending Drivers' Champion. Abraham Calderón won his second career championship.

In 2017, was created the NASCAR FedEx Challenge Series and NASCAR Mikel's Truck Series as supporting series of NASCAR PEAK Mexico Series.

== Drivers ==
No.	Manufacturer	Car Owner	Race Driver	Crew Chief
00	Ford	Patricia Marbán	Rodrigo Marbán 4	Juan Antonio Martínez
1	Toyota	Jimmy Morales	Luis Michael Dörrbecker 2	Jorge Torres 1
1	Toyota	Jimmy Morales	Luis Michael Dörrbecker 2	Unknown 1
2	Toyota	Jimmy Morales	Abraham Calderón	Alejandro Vega
3	Toyota	Jimmy Morales	Fabián Welter 6	Miguel Guzmán 4
3	Toyota	Jimmy Morales	Fabián Welter 6	Unknown 2
4	Ford 1	Jimmy Morales	Enrique Baca	Xristos Pappas
4	Chevrolet 4	Jimmy Morales	Enrique Baca	Xristos Pappas
4	Toyota 6	Jimmy Morales	Enrique Baca	Xristos Pappas
6	Toyota	Priscila Palazuelos	Rogelio López	Juan Tapia
07	Toyota	Héctor Félix	Héctor Félix 11	Óscar Torres
7	Ford 1 Chevrolet 10	Antonio Camacho	Carlos Peralta 10	Antonio Camacho
7	Ford 1 Chevrolet 10	Antonio Camacho	Elliot Van Rankin 1	Antonio Camacho
08	Ford	José Luis Ramírez	José Luis Ramírez	Juan Luis Quintanar
8	Toyota	Priscila Palazuelos	Freddy Tame Jr. 1	Unknown
8	Toyota	Priscila Palazuelos	Jim Nides 2	Unknown
09	Toyota	Alejandro Pimentel	Julio Rejón 5	Mario Muñoz
11	Chevrolet	Juan Salazar	Hugo Oliveras	Gregorio Machado
13	Ford	Alberto Tame	Alex González 11	Jorge González
15	Chevrolet	Luis Ruíz	Rubén Pardo	Bruno Pineda
16	Toyota	Miguel Sánchez	Mike Sánchez 11	Sergio Zúñiga
17	Toyota	Jimmy Morales	Luis Felipe Montaño	Unknown 1
17	Toyota	Jimmy Morales	Luis Felipe Montaño	Jorge Torres 11
18	Toyota	Juan Pablo García	Rafael Martínez	Martín Bautista
19	Toyota	Ramíro Fidalgo	Héctor Aguirre	Cuauhtémoc González
20	Toyota 4	Homero Richards	Homero Richards	Jorge Luis Alvarado
20	Ford 8	Homero Richards	Homero Richards	Jorge Luis Alvarado
22	Toyota	Héctor González	Patricio Jourdain Jr. 3	Jesús Flores
23	Ford	Allan van Rankin	Freddy Tame Jr. 6	Ricardo Robles
24	Ford	Pedro Torres	Max González 1	Carlos Trejo
26	Chevrolet	Estefanía Oliveras	Santiago Tovar	Ismael Hernández
28	Chevrolet	Victor Oliveras	Rubén Rovelo	Luis Ruíz
30	Toyota	Víctor Barrales	Víctor Barrales	Rafaél Hernández
31	Toyota	Jordi Vidal	Jorge Goeters	Jorge Eduardo García
32	Toyota	Rubén Ortíz	Rubén Ortíz 1	Salvador Arriaga
33	Ford	Unknown	Andrés Orea 2	Unknown
36	Toyota	Angélica Patiño	Pepe Montaño 8	Esteban Morales
37	Ford 8 Toyota 4	Pedro Torres	Pepe González	Randy Cardenas 1
37	Ford 8 Toyota 4	Pedro Torres	Pepe González	Carlos Talamantes 5
37	Ford 8 Toyota 4	Pedro Torres	Pepe González	Unknown 6
40	Toyota	Michel Jourdain Jr.	Michel Jourdain Jr.	Carlos González
42	Ford	Unknown	Juan Manuel González 1	Unknown
45	Toyota	Juan Carlos González	Nelson Canache 1	Marcos Carmona
45	Toyota	Juan Carlos González	Oscar Torres Jr. 2	Marcos Carmona
45	Toyota	Juan Carlos González	Patricio Jourdain Jr. 6	Marcos Carmona
46	Toyota	Jordi Vidal	Irwin Vences 6	Unknown
48	Toyota	Salvador de Alba Jr.	Salvador de Alba Jr.	Marcos García
54	Toyota	Miguel Jurado	Omar Jurado 2	Unknown
58	Toyota	Angelica Sánchez	Jorge Contreras Jr. 3	Leonel Morales 1
58	Toyota	Angelica Sánchez	Jorge Contreras Jr. 3	Unknown 2
65	Ford	Pedro Torres	Max González 7	Unknown 1
65	Ford	Pedro Torres	Max González 7	Carlos Talamantes 6
68	Ford	Horacio Richards	Manolín Gutiérrez	Mauricio Quintanar
77	Ford 1	Anapaula Villegas	Xavi Razo	Luis Perea
77	Toyota 11	Anapaula Villegas	Xavi Razo	Luis Perea
78	Toyota	Julio César Villalobos	Julio César Villalobos 1	Oscar Rodriguez
88	Toyota	Marcos Mendoza	Rubén García Jr.	Daniel Garrido
96	Toyota	Javier Fernández	Javier Fernández 2	Valentín Fernández 1
96	Toyota	Javier Fernández	Javier Fernández 2	Unknown 1

== Schedule ==
No.	Race Title	Track	Date
1	Difrenosa 120	(Nuevo León) Autódromo Monterrey, Apodaca	March 26
2	Canel's 200	(San Luis Potosí) Autódromo Potosino, Zaragoza	April 23
3	Red Cola 120	Autódromo Miguel E. Abed, Puebla	May 14
4	Gran Premio Transportes del Norte	(Jalisco) Trióvalo Internacional de Cajititlán, Guadalajara	June 4
5	Sidral Aga 90	(Guanajuato) Autódromo de León, León	June 25
6	Gran Premio Aguascalientes	Autódromo Internacional de Aguascalientes, Aguascalientes	July 16
7	Red Cola Pachuca	(Hidalgo (state)) Autódromo Moisés Solana, Pachuca	August 6
8	Chedraui 120	(Querétaro) Autódromo del Ecocentro de la Unión Ganadera, El Marqués	August 20
9	Sidral Aga Guadalajara	(Jalisco) Trióvalo Internacional de Cajititlán, Guadalajara	September 10
10	NASCAR corre por Chiapas	Súper Óvalo Chiapas, Tuxtla Gutiérrez	October 1
11	Corriendo por Puebla	Autódromo Miguel E. Abed, Puebla	October 15
12	Gran Premio FedEx	Autódromo Hermanos Rodríguez, Mexico City	November 12

Oval
Road Course

== Results and standings ==
=== Races ===
No.	Race	Pole position	Most laps led	Winning driver	Manufacturer
1	Difrenosa 120	Rubén García Jr.	Rubén Rovelo	Rubén Rovelo	Chevrolet
2	Canel's 200	Hugo Oliveras	Hugo Oliveras	Rogelio López	Toyota
3	Red Cola 120	Abraham Calderón	Xavi Razo	Abraham Calderón	Toyota
4	Gran Premio Transportes del Norte	Salvador de Alba Jr.	Rubén Rovelo	Rubén Rovelo	Chevrolet
5	Sidral Aga 90	Jorge Goeters	Homero Richards	Michel Jourdain Jr.	Toyota
6	Gran Premio Aguascalientes	Rogelio López	Rogelio López	Abraham Calderón	Toyota
7	Red Cola Pachuca	Rubén Pardo	Rubén Pardo	Abraham Calderón	Toyota
8	Chedraui 120	Rubén García Jr.	Irwin Vences	Irwin Vences	Toyota
9	Sidral Aga Guadalajara	Abraham Calderón	Abraham Calderón	Abraham Calderón	Toyota
10	NASCAR corre por Chiapas	Rogelio López	Abraham Calderón	Abraham Calderón	Toyota
11	Corriendo por Puebla	Homero Richards	José Luis Ramírez	José Luis Ramírez	Ford
12	Gran Premio FedEx	Salvador de Alba Jr.	Salvador de Alba Jr.	Xavi Razo	Toyota

=== Drivers' championship ===
(key) Bold – Pole position awarded by time. Italics – Pole position set by final practice results or Owners' points. * – Most laps led.

Pos.	Driver	MTY	SLP	PUE	GDL	LEO	AGS	PAC	QRO	GDL	TXG	PUE	MXC	Points
1	Abraham Calderón	9	18	**1**	14	22	1	1	3	**1***	1*	8	4	468
2	Rubén Rovelo	1*	2	4	1*	6	26	7	8	7	11	18	8	441
3	Rubén García Jr.	**7**	21	15	23	9	2	16	**4**	4	4	3	12	411
4	Jorge Goeters	4	28	5	9	**18**	4	4	5	2	8	23	19	403
5	Rogelio López	2	1	6	7	24	**23***	17	15	3	**18**	12	9	399
6	Xavi Razo	25	13	2*	17	3	6	5	14	6	19	22	1	398
7	Manolín Gutiérrez	14	6	16	8	19	8	2	27	8	3	16	3	398
8	Homero Richards	23	4	11	2	2*	5	21	26	20	6	**10**	5	397
9	Michel Jourdain Jr.	8	29	3	29	1	12	3	12	5	10	11	17	392
10	Luis Felipe Montaño	10	9	13	5	8	9	9	19	11	9	25	14	387
11	José Luis Ramírez	11	16	12	22	17	18	11	16	16	7	1*	6	380
12	Salvador de Alba Jr.	29	20	23	**4**	7	7	6	6	22	5	2	**20***	380
13	Hugo Oliveras	21	**3***	17	6	5	13	13	7	21	28	7	10	379
14	Héctor Aguirre	5	5	19	31	15	3	24	2	23	17	4	13	370
15	Rafael Martínez	3	27	7	24	12	17	15	20	9	2	5	21	367
16	Santiago Tovar	26	17	10	3	23	20	8	9	10	16	17	7	363
17	Rubén Pardo	16	8	8	28	4	27	**23***	30	19	24	6	2	336
18	Enrique Baca	13	14	24	10	20	22	10	22	15	21	19	11	327
19	Carlos Peralta	6	10	9	30	10	25	14	18	Wth			15	288
20	Víctor Barrales	18	12	20	25	14	16	25	25	18	27	26	23	279
21	Pepe González	27	30	27	16	21	21	26	24	17	13	14	26	266
22	Alex González	22	23	22	11	Wth	29	27	11	14		24	16	242
23	Héctor Félix	19	25	18	20	Wth	11	18	21	25	22		27	234
24	Mike Sánchez	DNS^{2}	22		27	16	28	Wth	23	13	26	13	18	224
25	Pepe Montaño	24	31	26	21	11	15	20	17					188
26	Irwin Vences						10	12	1*	24		21	25	176
27	Patricio Jourdain Jr.	28	26	21	13	13	24	22	29	Wth				176
28	Max González	15					30	19	28	26	25	20	22	167
29	Freddy Tame Jr.	12	11	25	26	25	14				14^{4}			151
30	Julio Rejón	20	15	28	15	Wth								98
31	Oscar Torres Jr.		7	14										67
Drivers ineligible for PEAK Mexico Series points
	Juan Manuel González											9		
	Jorge Contreras Jr.	Wth							10		23			
	Fabián Welter		24		12		19		13	12	29			
	Luis Michael Dörrbecker	Wth									12			
	Jim Nides											15	24	
	Elliot Van Rankin										15^{3}			
	Nelson Canache	17												
	Rodrigo Marbán	Wth	19		18				Wth					
	Andrés Orea				19					27				
	Javier Fernández	Wth									20			
	Omar Jurado	Wth					Wth							
	Rubén Ortíz	Wth												
	Julio César Villalobos	Wth												
Pos.	Driver	MTY	SLP	PUE	GDL	LEO	AGS	PAC	QRO	GDL	TXG	PUE	MXC	Points

Notes
They receive championship points in supporter series.

- ^{2} – Mike Sánchez received championship points, despite the fact that he did not start the race.
- ^{3} – Elliot Van Rankin substituted for Carlos Peralta and the 29 points he scored with fifteenth place went towards Carlos Peralta.
- ^{4} – Ineligible for points.

== See also ==
- 2017 Monster Energy NASCAR Cup Series
- 2017 NASCAR Xfinity Series
- 2017 NASCAR Camping World Truck Series
- 2017 NASCAR K&N Pro Series East
- 2017 NASCAR K&N Pro Series West
- 2017 NASCAR Whelen Modified Tour
- 2017 NASCAR Pinty's Series
- 2017 NASCAR Whelen Euro Series
