= Kevin O'Connell (racing driver) =

American racing driver (born 1967)

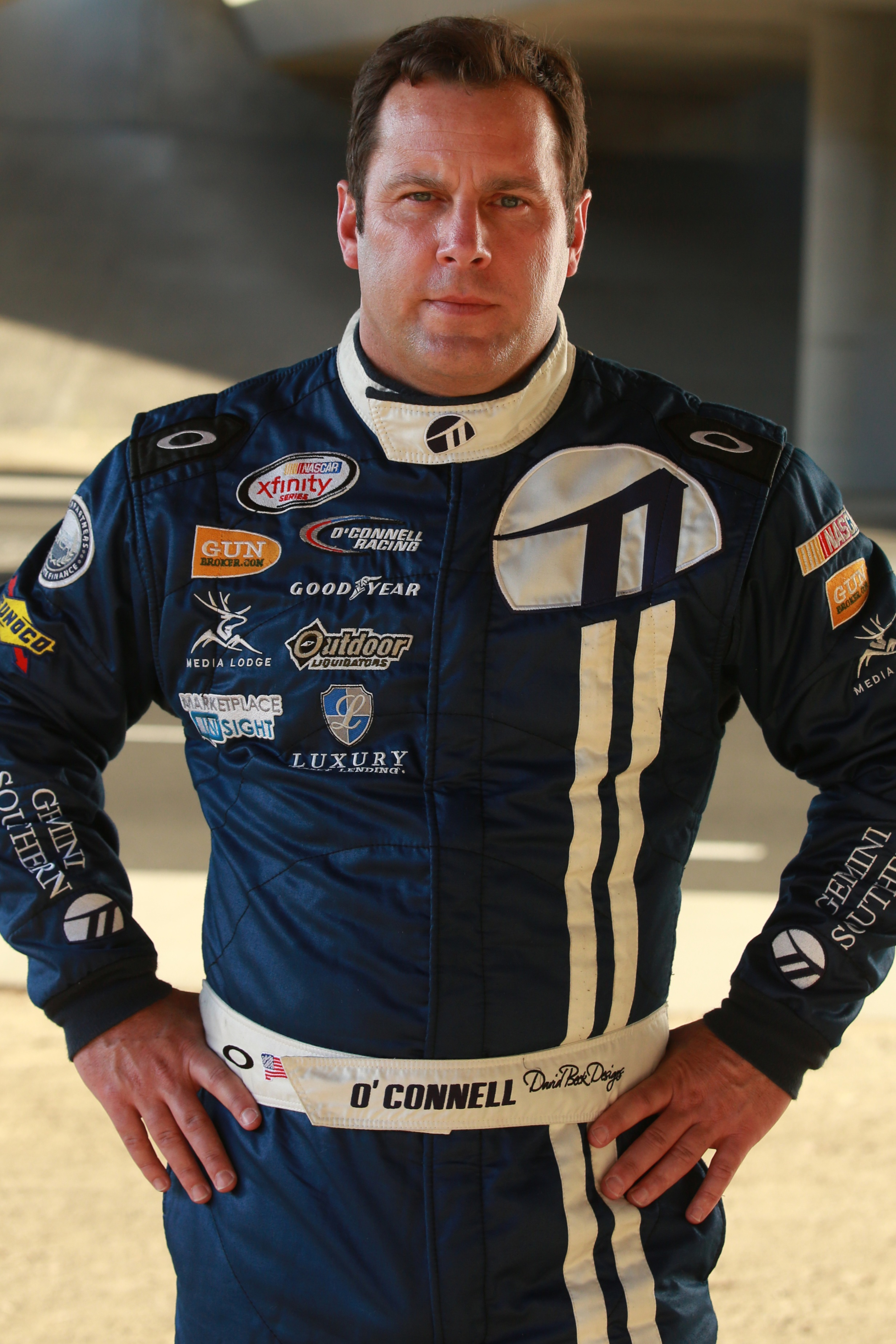
- O'Connell in 2015
- Born: April 29, 1967 (age 59); Newport Beach, California, U.S.

NASCAR Cup Series career
- 1 race run over 1 year
- 2017 position: 46th
- Best finish: 46th (2017)
- First race: 2017 Toyota/Save Mart 350 (Sonoma)
Wins	Top tens	Poles
0	0	0

NASCAR O'Reilly Auto Parts Series career
- 7 races run over 5 years
- 2015 position: 58th
- Best finish: 52nd (2014)
- First race: 2008 Corona México 200 (Mexico City)
- Last race: 2015 Road America 180 (Road America)
Wins	Top tens	Poles
0	1	0
- Statistics up to date as of June 25, 2017.

Kevin O'Connell (born April 29, 1967) is an American professional stock car racing driver. He last competed part-time in the 2017 Monster Energy NASCAR Cup Series, driving the No. 15 Chevrolet SS for Premium Motorsports.

== Racing career ==
O'Connell ran in the Rolex Sports Car Series in 2006 for O'Connell Racing in the 6 Hours of Watkins Glen. O'Connell also ran two races in the 2012 season with Rick Ware Racing at Road America and Indianapolis Motor Speedway.

From 2007 to 2008, O'Connell ran four races in the K&N Pro Series West, with a best finish of 15th at Infineon Raceway in 2007. In 2013, O'Connell entered the NASCAR Whelen Euro Series race at Brands Hatch, becoming the first American to race in the series on a road course.

In 2008, O'Connell made his NASCAR Nationwide Series debut at Autódromo Hermanos Rodríguez in the No. 09 Chevrolet for O'Connell Racing, with his Rolex pit crew also servicing his NASCAR team, and Rolex teammate Kevin Roush serving as spotter. After starting 34th, O'Connell was involved in a crash with David Reutimann in turn 7 on lap 36, finishing 37th. In 2010, O'Connell joined Curb Racing in the No. 43 at Road America, finishing 34th after suffering an engine failure. On June 21, 2014, it was announced that O'Connell would run in the Nationwide races at Road America and Watkins Glen International in the No. 23 for Rick Ware Racing. At Road America, after qualifying 26th with a lap speed of 104.941 miles per hour (168.886 km/h), O'Connell finished third, earning the "Mobile1 Driver of the Race" award after almost snatching the win from Brendan Gaughan on the final lap. In 2015, O'Connell drove the No. 13 Dodge Challenger for MBM Motorsports at Watkins Glen.

In 2017, it was announced that O'Connell would make his Monster Energy NASCAR Cup Series debut for Rick Ware Racing at Sonoma Raceway that summer. However, after the report came out Josh Bilicki said that he would drive the Sonoma race for the team. Instead, O'Connell drove the No. 15 for Premium Motorsports; after starting 36th, he finished 33rd.

== Personal life ==
O'Connell is the first driver in NASCAR's top three series (Cup, Xfinity, Camping World Truck Series) to receive his master's degree.

== Motorsports career results ==
=== NASCAR ===
(key) (Bold – Pole position awarded by qualifying time. Italics – Pole position earned by points standings or practice time. * – Most laps led.)

==== Monster Energy Cup Series ====
Monster Energy NASCAR Cup Series results
Year	Team	No.	Make	1	2	3	4	5	6	7	8	9	10	11	12	13	14	15	16	17	18	19	20	21	22	23	24	25	26	27	28	29	30	31	32	33	34	35	36	MENCC	Pts	Ref
2017	Premium Motorsports	15	Chevy	DAY	ATL	LVS	PHO	CAL	MAR	TEX	BRI	RCH	TAL	KAN	CLT	DOV	POC	MCH	SON; 33	DAY	KEN	NHA	IND	POC	GLN	MCH	BRI	DAR	RCH	CHI	NHA	DOV	CLT	TAL	KAN	MAR	TEX	PHO	HOM	46th	4	

==== Xfinity Series ====
NASCAR Xfinity Series results
Year	Team	No.	Make	1	2	3	4	5	6	7	8	9	10	11	12	13	14	15	16	17	18	19	20	21	22	23	24	25	26	27	28	29	30	31	32	33	34	35	NXSC	Pts	Ref
2008	O'Connell Racing	09	Chevy	DAY	CAL	LVS	ATL	BRI	NSH	TEX	PHO	MXC; 37	TAL	RCH	DAR	CLT	DOV	NSH	KEN	MLW	NHA	DAY	CHI	GTY	IRP	CGV; DNQ	GLN	MCH	BRI	CAL	RCH	DOV	KAN	CLT	MEM	TEX	PHO	HOM	140th	52	
2010	Curb Racing	43	Chevy	DAY	CAL	LVS	BRI	NSH	PHO	TEX	TAL	RCH	DAR	DOV	CLT	NSH	KEN	ROA; 34	NHA	DAY	CHI	GTY	IRP	IOW	GLN	MCH	BRI	CGV; DNQ	ATL	RCH	DOV	KAN	CAL	CLT	GTY	TEX	PHO	HOM	134th	61	
2013	Mike Harmon Racing	74	Chevy	DAY	PHO	LVS	BRI	CAL	TEX	RCH	TAL	DAR	CLT	DOV	IOW	MCH	ROA; 22	KEN	DAY	NHA	CHI	IND	IOW	GLN	MOH; 34	BRI	ATL	RCH	CHI	KEN	DOV	KAN	CLT	TEX	PHO	HOM			66th	32	
2014	Rick Ware Racing	23	Chevy	DAY	PHO	LVS	BRI	CAL	TEX	DAR	RCH	TAL	IOW	CLT	DOV	MCH	ROA; 3	KEN	DAY	NHA	CHI	IND	IOW	GLN; 37	MOH	BRI	ATL	RCH	CHI	KEN	DOV	KAN	CLT	TEX	PHO	HOM			52nd	48	
2015	MBM Motorsports	13	Dodge	DAY	ATL	LVS	PHO	CAL	TEX	BRI	RCH	TAL	IOW	CLT	DOV	MCH	CHI	DAY	KEN	NHA	IND	IOW	GLN; 33	MOH	BRI														58th	35	
2015	Rick Ware Racing	15	Chevy																							ROA; 17	DAR	RCH	CHI	KEN	DOV	CLT	KAN	TEX	PHO	HOM			58th	35	

==== K&N Pro Series East ====
NASCAR K&N Pro Series East results
Year	Team	No.	Make	1	2	3	4	5	6	7	8	9	10	11	12	13	14	NKNPSEC	Pts	Ref
2015	Spraker Racing	37	Chevy	NSM	GRE	BRI	IOW	BGS	LGY	COL	NHA	IOW	GLN; 21	MOT	VIR	RCH	DOV	57th	23	

==== K&N Pro Series West ====
NASCAR K&N Pro Series West results
Year	Team	No.	Make	1	2	3	4	5	6	7	8	9	10	11	12	13	14	NKNPSWC	Pts	Ref
2007	O'Connell Racing	06	Chevy	CTS	PHO	AMP	ELK	IOW	CNS	SON; 15	DCS	IRW						34th	330	
2007	Melo Motorsports	59	Chevy										MMP; 17	EVG	CSR; 21	AMP		34th	330	
2008	O'Connell Racing	59	Chevy	AAS	PHO	CTS	IOW	CNS	SON; 20	IRW	DCS	EVG	MMP	IRW	AMP	AAS		64th	103	
2017	Performance P-1 Motorsports	77	Chevy	TUS	KCR	IRW	IRW	SPO	OSS	CNS	SON; 32	IOW	EVG	DCS	MER	AAS	KCR	63rd	12	

==== Canadian Tire Series ====
NASCAR Canadian Tire Series results
Year	Team	No.	Make	1	2	3	4	5	6	7	8	9	10	11	NCTSC	Pts	Ref
2015	Derek White	00	Chevy	MSP; 21	ACD	SSS	ICAR	EIR	SAS	ASE	CTR	RIS	MSP	KWA	50th	23	

==== Mexico Series ====
NASCAR Mexico Series results
Year	Team	No.	Make	1	2	3	4	5	6	7	8	9	10	11	12	13	14	15	NMSC	Pts	Ref
2015	Fenix Racing	14	Ford	PHO; 18	SLP	TUX	QRO	PUE	AGS	CHI	SLP	PUE	SLP	CHI	AGS	MXC	MXC	TUX	34th	26	

==== Whelen Euro Series - Elite 1 ====
NASCAR Whelen Euro Series - Elite 1 results
Year	Team	No.	Make	1	2	3	4	5	6	7	8	9	10	11	12	NWES	Pts	Ref
2013	Racing Club Partners	20	Toyota	NOG	NOG	DIJ	DIJ	BRH; 14	BRH; 15	TOU	TOU	MNZ	MNZ	BUG	BUG	35th	-	

==== Whelen Euro Series - Elite 2 ====
NASCAR Whelen Euro Series - Elite 2 results
Year	Team	No.	Make	1	2	3	4	5	6	7	8	9	10	11	12	NWES	Pts	Ref
2013	Racing Club Partners	20	Toyota	NOG	NOG	DIJ	DIJ	BRH; 22	BRH; 8	TOU	TOU	MNZ	MNZ	BUG	BUG	35th	-	

^{*} Season still in progress
^{1} Ineligible for series points
