= 2014 NASCAR Toyota Series =

Seasons
- ← 2013 2015 →

The 2014 NASCAR Toyota Series was the eighth season of the NASCAR Toyota Series, and the eleventh season organized by NASCAR Mexico. It began with the Toyota 120 at Phoenix International Raceway on February 28, and ended with the Puebla 240 at Autódromo Miguel E. Abed in Puebla, on November 9. Rodrigo Peralta entered the season as the defending Drivers' Champion.

Abraham Calderón won his first series championship at Puebla, finishing nine points ahead of Rubén García Jr.; both drivers failed to win any races during the season, but were able to finish strongly in the five-race Desafío, which concluded the season. Calderón achieved eleven top-ten finishes, while Garcia Jr. took ten top-ten finishes. Rubén Rovelo finished third in the championship, eleven points in arrears of Calderón, winning races at Aguascalientes and Tuxtla Gutiérrez.

Six other drivers won races during the season, including Daniel Suárez, who won a total of five races including three of the first four races. A pair of finishes outside the top 20 in the Desafío saw Suárez finish in 6th in the championship. Irwin Vences, who made the Desafío despite missing the first four races of the season, won two races as well, winning the first Puebla race and the second San Luis Potosí event. Rubén Pardo (the first event at Querétaro and Chihuahua) and Homero Richards (the second Querétaro event, and the season-ending Puebla event) each won two races, while Luis Felipe Montaño – at Autódromo Hermanos Rodríguez – and Rogelio López, at the first San Luis Potosí race, each took one win.

== Drivers ==
No.	Manufacturer	Car Owner	Race Driver
00	Toyota	Patricia Marbán	Rodrigo Marbán
0	Toyota	Rafael Vallina	Rafael Vallina 10
01	Toyota	Israel Jaitovich	Israel Jaitovich
1	Toyota	Jimmy Morales	Antonio Pérez
2	Dodge 14	Monica Morales	Abraham Calderón
2	Toyota 1	Monica Morales	Abraham Calderón
3	Toyota	Alejandro Cruz	Daniel Suárez
4	Toyota	Jorge Goeters	Jorge Goeters
05	Toyota	Alejandra González	Héctor Aguirre 9
5	Chevrolet	Daniel Cruz	José Luis Ramírez
6	Toyota	Priscila Parazuelos	Rogelio López
07	Toyota	Héctor Félix	Héctor Félix 10
07	Toyota	Héctor Félix	Alejandro Capín 3
7	Toyota	Marcela Peralta	Carlos Peralta
8	Toyota	Antonio Camacho	Freddy Tame, Jr.
9	Toyota	Anapaula Villegas	Elliot Van Rankin 3
10	Toyota	Oscar Peralta	Oscar Peralta 1
10	Toyota	Oscar Peralta	Carlos Anaya 1
11	Toyota	Paola Ezquerro	Hugo Oliveras
12	Toyota	David Tame	Jim Nides 14 (R)
14	Toyota	Carlos Contreras	Patrick Goeters
15	Toyota	Rafael Oliveras	Rubén Pardo
16	Toyota	Ruben Arenal Mendoza	Mike Sánchez 9
16	Toyota	Ruben Arenal Mendoza	Rubén Rovelo 1
18	Mazda	Ramiro Fidalgo	Rafael Martínez
19	Mazda	Juan Pablo García	Mario Domínguez (R)
20	Toyota	Homero Richards	Homero Richards
22	Toyota	Luis Tame	Santiago Tovar12 (R)
24	Toyota	Denisse Guaida	Rodrigo Peralta
28	Toyota 11	Ricardo Moreno Hernandez	Rubén Rovelo 13
28	Dodge1	Ricardo Moreno Hernandez	Rubén Rovelo 13
28	Ford1	Ricardo Moreno Hernandez	Rubén Rovelo 13
29	Toyota	Carlos Azcarate	Carlos Azcarate 7 (R)
30	Toyota	Víctor Manuel Barrales	Víctor Barrales
36	Toyota	Angelica Patiño	Pepe Montaño
38	Toyota	Luis Dario Lambert	Elliot Van Rankin 2
43	Toyota	Olga Vallina	Óscar Ruíz de Azua 2
46	Toyota	Jordi Vidal	Irwin Vences 11
51	Toyota 6	Juan Carlos Gonzalez	Santiago Tovar 3 (R)
51	Toyota 6	Juan Carlos Gonzalez	Carlos Azcarate 3 (R)
51	Dodge 9	Juan Carlos Gonzalez	Carlos Azcarate 1 (R)
51	Dodge 9	Juan Carlos Gonzalez	José González 8
55	Toyota	Arnulfo Rogel Hernandez	Jorge Contreras, Sr. 7
57	Toyota	Nathaly Cervantes	Alejandro Capín 1
58	Toyota 5	Jorge Contreras Caballero	Jorge Contreras, Jr. 14
58	Mazda 9	Jorge Contreras Caballero	Jorge Contreras, Jr. 14
69	Toyota	Javier Fernández	Javier Fernández 12
69	Toyota	Javier Fernández	Carlos Azcarate 1 (R)
71	Toyota	Miriam Ibarra	Cody Ware 1 (R)
77	Toyota	Enrique Contreras	Enrique Contreras III
83	Toyota	Jorge Seman	Javier Razo 11
83	Toyota	Jorge Seman	Elliot Van Rankin 4
87	Toyota	Estefania Oliveras	Luis Felipe Montaño
88	Toyota	Victor Trejo	Rubén García Jr.
98	Toyota	Teresa Gutierrez	Erik Mondragon 5

== Schedule ==
No.	Race title	Track	Date
1	Toyota 120	(Arizona) Phoenix International Raceway, Avondale	February 28
2	México 240	Autódromo Hermanos Rodríguez, Mexico City	April 5
3	Red Co 240	Autódromo Chiapas, Tuxtla Gutiérrez	April 13
4	Regia 240	(Nuevo León) Autódromo Monterrey, Apodaca	April 27
5	Potosina 200	(San Luis Potosí) Autódromo Potosino, Zaragoza	May 11
6	Queretana 200	(Querétaro) Autódromo del Ecocentro de la Unión Ganadera, El Marqués	May 25
7	México 240	Autódromo Hermanos Rodríguez, Mexico City	June 8
8	Aguascalientes 240	Autódromo Internacional de Aguascalientes, Aguascalientes	July 20
9	Queretana 200	(Querétaro) Autódromo del Ecocentro de la Unión Ganadera, El Marqués	August 3
10	Puebla 240	Autódromo Miguel E. Abed, Puebla	August 17
Desafío cut-off
11	Chihuahua 240	(Chihuahua (state)) El Dorado Speedway, Chihuahua	September 7
12	Potosina 200	(San Luis Potosí) Autódromo Potosino, Zaragoza	September 21
13	Aguascalientes 240	Autódromo Internacional de Aguascalientes, Aguascalientes	October 5
14	Tuxtla 240	Autódromo Chiapas, Tuxtla Gutiérrez	October 19
15	Puebla 240	Autódromo Miguel E. Abed, Puebla	November 9

Oval
Road Course

== Results and standings ==
=== Races ===
No.	Race	Pole position	Most laps led	Winning driver	Manufacturer
1	Toyota 120	Rubén Pardo	Antonio Pérez	Daniel Suárez	Toyota
2	México 240	Antonio Pérez	Antonio Pérez	Luis Felipe Montaño	Toyota
3	Red Co 240	Rubén Pardo	Daniel Suárez	Daniel Suárez	Toyota
4	Regia 240	Antonio Pérez	Rubén Rovelo	Daniel Suárez	Toyota
5	Potosina 200	Daniel Suárez	Daniel Suárez	Rogelio López	Toyota
6	Queretana 200	Santiago Tovar	Rubén Rovelo	Rubén Pardo	Toyota
7	México 240	Daniel Suárez^{1}	Abraham Calderón	Daniel Suárez	Toyota
8	Aguascalientes 240	Daniel Suárez	Hugo Oliveras	Rubén Rovelo	Dodge
9	Queretana 200	Santiago Tovar	Homero Richards	Homero Richards	Toyota
10	Puebla 240	Irwin Vences	Irwin Vences	Irwin Vences	Toyota
Desafío cut-off
11	Chihuahua 240	Irwin Vences	Daniel Suárez	Rubén Pardo	Toyota
12	Potosina 200	Rubén García Jr.	Rafael Martínez	Irwin Vences	Toyota
13	Aguascalientes 240	Irwin Vences	Rubén García Jr.	Daniel Suárez	Toyota
14	Tuxtla 240	Abraham Calderón^{2}	Rubén García Jr.	Rubén Rovelo	Toyota
15	Puebla 240	Daniel Suárez	Daniel Suárez	Homero Richards	Toyota

Notes

- ^{1} – The qualifying session for the México 240 was cancelled due to heavy rain. The starting line-up was decided by championship points.
- ^{2} – The qualifying session for the Tuxtla 240 was cancelled due to heavy rain. The starting line-up was decided by championship points.

=== Drivers' championship ===
(key) (Bold – Pole position awarded by qualifying time. Italics – Pole position earned by points standings or practice time. * – Most laps led.)

Pos.	Driver	PHO	MXC	TUX	MTY	SLP	QRO	MXC	AGS	QRO	PUE	CHI	SLP	AGS	TUX	PUE	Points
1	Abraham Calderón	12	9	9	12	9	22	2*	5	12	6	2	4	2	7	7	1200
2	Rubén García Jr.	7	11	10	9	26	27	6	19	8	5	9	**9**	3*	2*	12	1191
3	Rubén Rovelo		34	31	24*	4	8*	3	1	32	4	5	7	15	1	9	1189
4	Rubén Pardo	**5**	4	**8**	6	19	1	18	4	9	14	1	19	9	4	11	1186
5	Antonio Pérez	3*	**3***	2	**3**	2	10	7	30	2	11	8	6	14	8	8	1178
6	Daniel Suárez	1	2	1*	1	**11***	3	1	**16**	24	18	7*	23	1	28	**6***	1177
7	Irwin Vences					3	9	32	3	3	**1***	**28**	1	**12**	11	3	1171
8	Rogelio López	26	6	23	17	1	13	5	20	4	8	13	3	13	30	2	1160
9	José Luis Ramírez	6	7	3	22	29	14	8	8	10	10	11	10	26	12	21	1140
10	Luis Felipe Montaño	4	1	19	5	30	12	11	21	7	17	12	8	34	21	23	1125
11	Homero Richards	14	8	15	4	27	6	29	6	1*	2	18	21	28	35	1	1124
12	Carlos Peralta	16	10	13	18	7	11	10	9	11	13	27	30	29	14	26	1095
Desafío cut-off
Pos	Driver	PHO	MXC	TUX	MTY	SLP	QRO	MXC	AGS	QRO	PUE	CHI	SLP	AGS	TUX	PUE	Points
13	Patrick Goeters	20	25	4	10	5	2	20	15	30	23	3	5	18	6	5	462
14	Hugo Oliveras	30	19	11	25	10	15	14	2*	6	3	16	22	6	13	13	458
15	Rafael Martínez	8	5	6	33	6	5	27	12	5	28	10	2*	32	22	4	457
16	Jorge Goeters	29	26	17	7	17	26	4	7	18	15	4	12	5	10	30	434
17	Freddy Tame, Jr.	9	13	14	11	13	17	15	14	22	12	6	18	27	18	27	424
18	Rodrigo Peralta	2	12	7	20	12	31	22	18	29	29	14	15	20	3	20	408
19	Enrique Contreras III	11	21	12	13	8	24	9	27	33	26	19	11	7	9	32	399
20	Santiago Tovar **(R)**	24	20	28	32	28	**7**	13	11	**17**	7	23	16	4	5	22	397
21	Pepe Montaño	23	31	18	31	35	16	16	33	13	21	25	13	11	19	16	340
22	Jorge Contreras, Jr.		14	21	28	20	20	28	10	15	16	17	28	19	27	14	339
23	Mario Domínguez **(R)**	10	17	26	8	14	30	26	13	28	19	29	25	33	16	34	332
24	Rodrigo Marbán	27	29	16	14	21	29	17	32	19	22	21	24	31	23	18	317
25	Víctor Barrales	22	28	27	26	25	28	23	26	27	20	26	17	17	20	19	309
26	Israel Jaitovich	21	32	20	16	22	DNQ^{1}	35	23	14	31	32	20	30	24	24	279
27	Héctor Aguirre		16	5	2	32	4	12	17	26	9						276
28	Elliot Van Rankin	18	15	25		16	19				30		31	8	15	10	254
29	Héctor Félix	15	18	30	15	18	18	36						25	17	15	233
30	Jim Nides **(R)**	25	27	24	27		DNQ^{1}	30	28	21	32	30	26	23	25	36	227
31	Carlos Azcarate **(R)**			29	19	33	32	21	22	20	27	24		21	29	29	222
32	Javier Razo	28	23	22	21	15	23	33	35	23		15					203
33	Javier Fernández	17	24		30	31	DNQ^{1}	25	24	25	34			24	33	28	195
34	Rafael Vallina	19	33			24	25	33				22	27	16	31	31	182
35	Mike Sánchez		22		29	23	21	24			24			22	26	25	180
36	José González								25	31	33	20	29	10	32	17	155
37	Jorge Contreras, Sr.				23		DNQ^{1}	19	29		25	31				33	113
38	Alejandro Capín							EX^{2}	34	16			14				75
39	Erik Mondragon					34	34	34	31						34		53
40	Óscar Ruíz de Azua	13	30														45
41	Oscar Peralta						33										11
42	Cody Ware **(R)**															35	9
43	Carlos Anaya							EX^{2}									7
Pos	Driver	PHO	MXC	TUX	MTY	SLP	QRO	MXC	AGS	QRO	PUE	CHI	SLP	AGS	TUX	PUE	Points

Notes

- ^{1} – Jim Nides, Jorge Contreras, Sr., Israel Jaitovich and Javier Fernández all received championship points, despite the fact that they did not qualify for the race.
- ^{2} – Carlos Anaya and Alejandro Capín received championship points, despite the fact that they were excluded from the race.

== See also ==
- 2014 NASCAR Sprint Cup Series
- 2014 NASCAR Nationwide Series
- 2014 NASCAR Camping World Truck Series
- 2014 NASCAR K&N Pro Series East
- 2014 NASCAR K&N Pro Series West
- 2014 NASCAR Whelen Modified Tour
- 2014 NASCAR Whelen Southern Modified Tour
- 2014 NASCAR Canadian Tire Series
- 2014 NASCAR Whelen Euro Series
