= Rubén Rovelo =

Mexican racing driver (born 1987)

- Born: October 3, 1987 (age 39); Mexico City, Mexico

NASCAR O'Reilly Auto Parts Series career
- 1 race run over 1 year
- 2025 position: 75th
- Best finish: 75th (2025)
- First race: 2025 The Chilango 150 (Mexico City)
Wins	Top tens	Poles
0	0	0

NASCAR Mexico Series career
- 186 races run over 15 years
- 2024 position: 12th
- Best finish: 1st (2020)
- First race: 2008 Queretaro 200 (Queretaro)
- Last race: 2024 SpeedFest/La Gran Final (Mexico City)
- First win: 2008 Guadalajara (Guadalajara)
- Last win: 2021 San Luis Potosí 2 (San Luis)
Wins	Top tens	Poles
26	119	7

ARCA Menards Series East career
- 5 races run over 1 year
- Best finish: 25th (2010)
- First race: 2010 Kevin Whitaker Chevrolet 150 (Greenville)
- Last race: 2010 Slack Auto Parts 150 (Jefferson)
Wins	Top tens	Poles
0	1	0
- Statistics up to date as of June 11, 2025.

Rubén Rovelo (born October 3, 1987) is a Mexican professional racing driver. He last competed part-time in the NASCAR Xfinity Series, driving the No. 35 Chevrolet Camaro SS for Joey Gase Motorsports with Scott Osteen. He has previously competed in the NASCAR Mexico Series and the NASCAR K&N Pro Series East.

Rovelo is a former champion of the NASCAR Mexico Series, having won the championship in 2020.

== Racing career ==
=== NASCAR Xfinity Series ===
On June 10, 2025, it was announced that Rovelo would attempt to make his NASCAR Xfinity Series debut for his hometown race at Mexico, driving the No. 35 Chevrolet for Joey Gase Motorsports with Scott Osteen. He would finish in 37th place after suffering a broken track bar after the first stage.

== Motorsports career results ==
=== NASCAR ===
(key) (Bold – Pole position awarded by qualifying time. Italics – Pole position earned by points standings or practice time. * – Most laps led.)

==== Xfinity Series ====
NASCAR Xfinity Series results
Year	Team	No.	Make	1	2	3	4	5	6	7	8	9	10	11	12	13	14	15	16	17	18	19	20	21	22	23	24	25	26	27	28	29	30	31	32	33	NXSC	Pts	Ref
2025	Joey Gase Motorsports with Scott Osteen	35	Chevy	DAY	ATL	COA	PHO	LVS	HOM	MAR	DAR	BRI	CAR	TAL	TEX	CLT	NSH	MXC; 37	POC	ATL	CSC	SON	DOV	IND	IOW	GLN	DAY	PIR	GTW	BRI	KAN	ROV	LVS	TAL	MAR	PHO	75th	1	

^{*} Season still in progress
^{1} Ineligible for series points

==== K&N Pro Series East ====
NASCAR K&N Pro Series East results
Year	Team	No.	Make	1	2	3	4	5	6	7	8	9	10	NKNPSEC	Pts	Ref
2010	Ben Kennedy Racing	12	Dodge	GRE; 9	SBO; 15	IOW	MAR	NHA; 20	LRP; 27	LEE	JFC; 23	NHA	DOV	25th	535	

==== Mexico Series ====
NASCAR Mexico Series results
Year	Team Owner	No.	Make	1	2	3	4	5	6	7	8	9	10	11	12	13	14	15	NMSC	Pts	Ref
2008	Jimmy Morales	2	Ford	AGS; 14	MXC; 10	SLP; 21	GDL; 1	ZAC; 8	PUE; 7	MTY; 2	SLP; 5	GDL; 19	PUE; 8	QRO; 27	SLP; 6	TXG; 16	MXC; 16		7th	1891	
2009	Jimmy Morales	5	N/A	**AGS**; 17	TXG; 5	SLP; 2	PUE; 5	QRO; 15	GDL; 6	**ZAC**; 14	SLP; 23	PUE; 8	MTY; 25	**QRO**; 1*	MXC; 2	TXG; 22	**AGS**; 4		7th	1929	
2010	Jimmy Morales	5	Chevy	AGS; 17	QRO; 7	SLP; 7	TXG; 6	MXC; 5	PUE; 19	GDL; 13	MTY; 1*	SLP; 24	MXC; 1	QRO; 33	PUE; 5	TXG; 4	AGS; 33		6th	1831	
2011	Jimmy Morales	5	Toyota	MTY; 3	SLP; 3	AGS; 25	TUX; 3	QRO; 8	PUE; 9	MXC; 8	SLP; 5	MTY; 3	QRO; 9	PUE; 25	SLP; 32	AGS; 7	MXC; 4		4th	1924	
2012	Jimmy Morales	5	Toyota	MTY; 1*	SLP; 9	QRO; 21	MXC; 4	PUE; 11	AGS; 16	MXC; 29									10th	437	
2012	Jimmy Morales	2	Dodge								SLP; 26	QRO; 4	AGS; 1	PUE; 29	MTY; 15	**CHI**; 2	MXC; 20		10th	437	
2013	Jimmy Morales	5	Toyota	PHO; 14	SLP; 24	MXC; 10	QRO; 7	CHI; 3	AGS; 3	PUE; 3	MTY; 26	QRO; 5	MXC; 8	SLP; 19	PUE; 6	AGS; 22	TUX	MXC; 20	10th	1110	
2014	Alfredo Montiel Garcia	28	Toyota	PHO	MXC; 34		MTY; 24*												3rd	1189	
2014	Ruben Arenal	16	Toyota			TUX; 31													3rd	1189	
2014	Ricardo Moreno	28	Toyota					SLP; 4	QRO; 8*	MXC; 3		QRO; 32	PUE; 4	CHI; 5	**SLP**; 7	AGS; 15	TUX; 1		3rd	1189	
2014	Ricardo Moreno	28	Dodge								AGS; 1								3rd	1189	
2014	Ricardo Moreno	28	Ford															PUE; 9	3rd	1189	
2015	Juan Carlos Gonzalez	28	Chevy	PHO; 26															2nd	1195	
2015	Juan Carlos Gonzalez	28	Dodge		SLP; 1*	TUX; 1	QRO; 10	PUE; 3	AGS; 2	CHI; 7	SLP; 2	PUE; 3	SLP; 1*	CHI; 8	AGS; 3	MXC; 6*	MXC; 8	TUX; 14	2nd	1195	
2017	Victor Hugo Oliveras	28	Chevy	MTY; 1*	SLP; 2	PUE; 4	GDL; 1*	LEO; 6	AGS; 26	PAC; 7									2nd	441	
2017	Victor Hugo Oliveras	28	Toyota								QRO; 8	GDL; 7	TUX; 11	PUE; 18	MXC; 8				2nd	441	
2018	Lilian Castellano	28	Toyota	MTY; 4	SLP; 19	CHI; 1	**GDL**; 5	PUE; 7	AGS; 16	QRO; 7	PUE; 1*	TUX; 2	AGS; 4	GDL; 4	MXC; 12				3rd	459	
2019	Lilian Castellano	28	Toyota	MTY; 13*	TUX; 21	GDL; 2	AGS; 15	PUE; 13	CHI; 1*	QRO; 3	SLP; 1	GDL; 12	PUE; 2	AGS; 1	MXC; 11*				5th	452	
2020	Alessandros Racing	28	Toyota	QRO; 1**	**SLP**; 1*	AGS; 1	PUE; 5	PUE; 3	QRO; 3	QRO; 1	SLP; 3	AGS; 3	QRO; 3*	QRO; 1*	PUE; 10				1st	522	
2021	Alessandros Racing	28	Ford	TUX; 13	QRO; 1*	PUE; 10	AGS; 4	SLP; 9	QRO; 11*	MTY; 1*	AGS; 2	**SLP**; 1	GDL; 11	PUE; 15	PUE; 3				5th	379	
2022	Alessandros Racing	28	Chevy	TUX; 10	QRO; 4	CHI; 5	GDL; 8	PUE; 7	SLP; 2	MTY; 12	AGS; 13	QRO; 10	MXC; 2	GDL; 3	PUE; 4				3rd	216	
2023	Alessandros Racing	28	Chevy	TUX; 20	SLP; 15	CHI; 7	QRO; 6	AGS; 11	PUE; 6	MTY; 11	SLP; 18	QRO; 8	CHI; 9	PUE; 18	MXC; 10				13th	318	
2024	Alessandros Racing	28	Chevy	SLP; 13	TUX; 17	CHI; 10	AGS; 8	MTY; 13	PUE; 10	SLP; 3	QRO; 12	AGS; 8	CHI; 18	PUE; 13	MXC; 3				12th	360	
