= 2010 NASCAR Corona Series =

Seasons
- ← 2009 2011 →

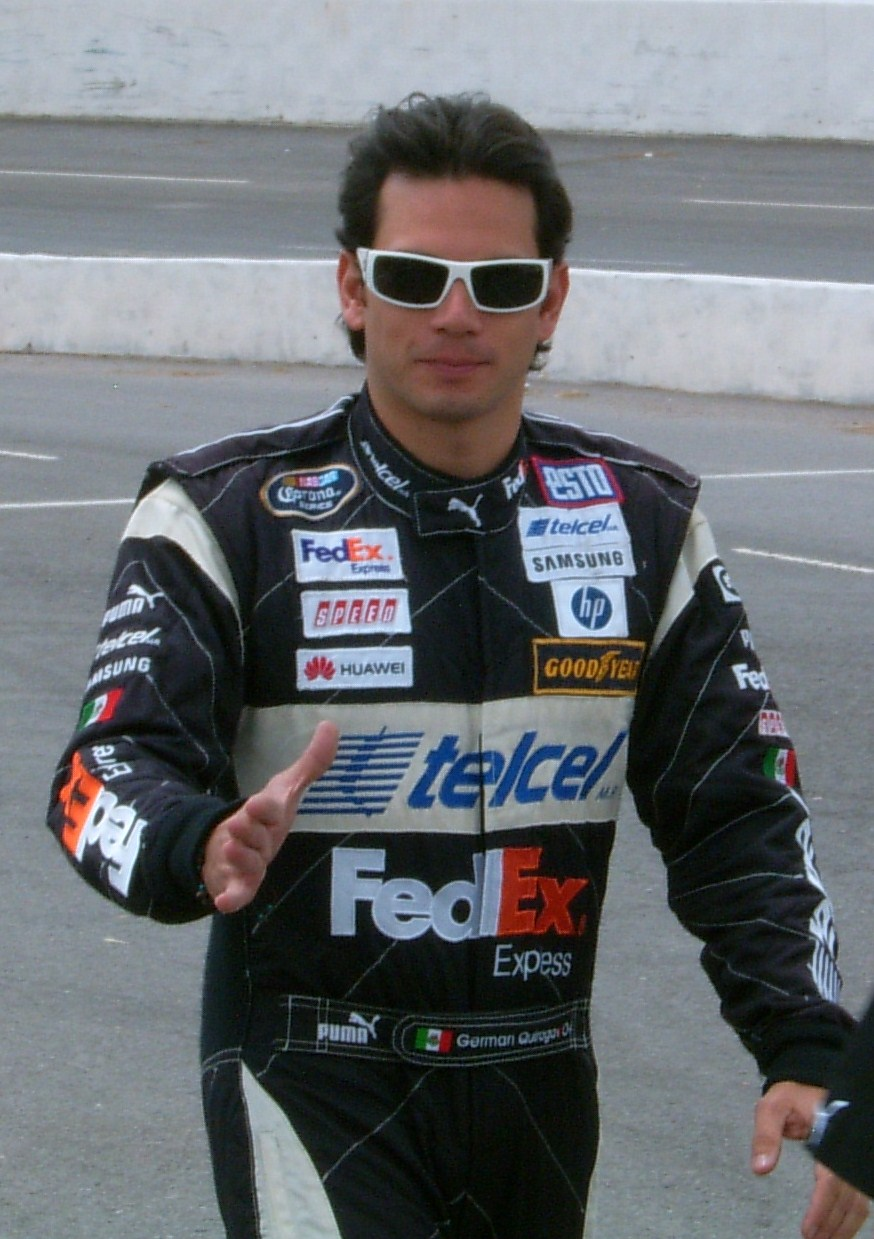
Germán Quiroga, the 2010 NASCAR Mexico champion

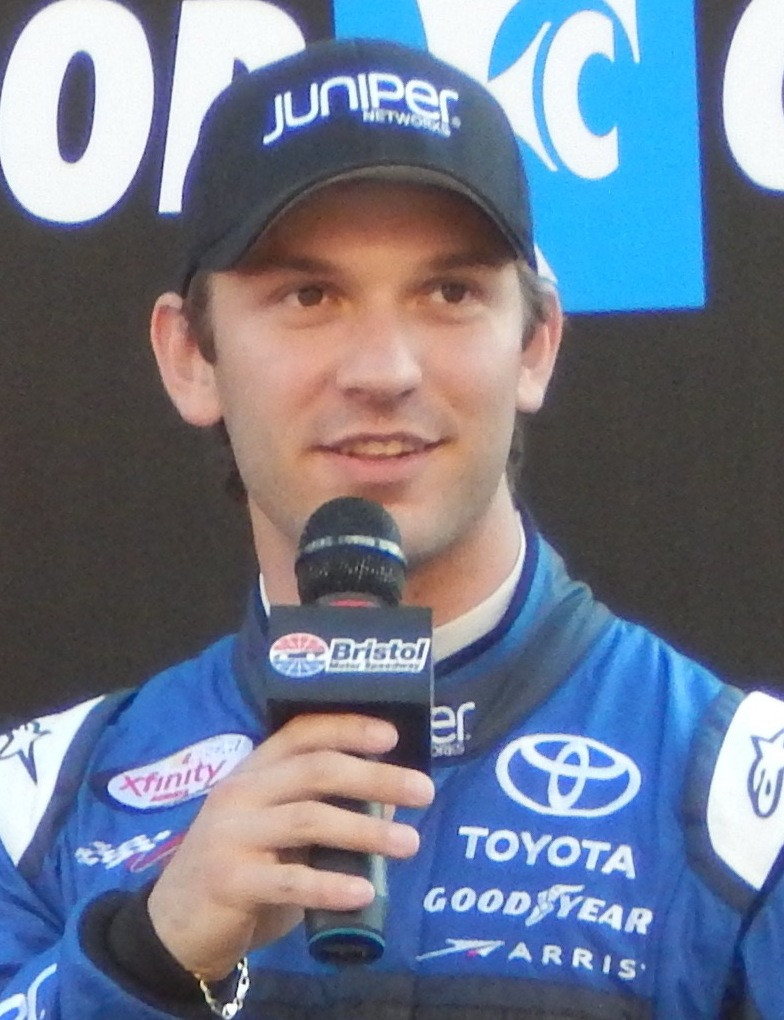
Daniel Suárez, pictured in 2015, the 2010 NASCAR Mexico Rookie of the Year.

The 2010 NASCAR Corona Series was the seventh season of the Corona Series, which was organized by NASCAR Mexico. The season was composed by fourteen races. Aguascalientes was venue of the kickoff and the final event. Germán Quiroga won his second championship in row.

== Report ==
For first time Mazda took part in a series sanctioned by NASCAR. Mazda entered with the Mazda6. TeamGP was the first team to run with this car. Mazda won its first three races and the final race in the season.

The season kickoff in Aguascalientes. Rafael Martínez began the year taking the victory. In the second race in Querétaro, Martínez won again. The third race was won by the Martínez's teammate, Jorge Goeters, in San Luis Potosí. But, Rafael Martínez had a chrash and finished in 27th place and lost the leadership of the season, and Antonio Pérez became in the new leader. The fourth race of the season was the first night race in the NCS. Tuxtla Gutiérrez was venue of this race. Salvador Durán took his first pole position and Germán Quiroga won the race. Pérez maintained the leadership of NCS. Homero Richards took the victory in the fifth race in the Autódromo Hermanos Rodríguez's oval. Richards again won in Puebla, meanwhile Pérez continued like leader.

== Teams and drivers ==
Team	Manufacturer	No.	Race Driver	Rounds
2b Racing	Chevrolet	07	Ricardo Pérez de Lara	2–14
2b Racing	Chevrolet	7	Carlos Peralta	All
2b Racing	Chevrolet	10	Oscar Peralta	All
Equipo Telcel	Dodge; Ford	2	Germán Quiroga	All
Equipo Telcel	Dodge; Ford	3	Alejandro Capin	1–6
Equipo Telcel	Dodge; Ford	3	Daniel Suárez	7–14
Escuderia Telmex	Chevrolet	1	Antonio Pérez	All
Escuderia Telmex	Toyota	5	Rubén Rovelo	All
HDI Seguros Racing Team	Mazda	27	Ruben García Novoa	All
HDI Seguros Racing Team	Mazda	88	Alejandro Capín	7–14
H&HighSpeed	Toyota	20	Homero Richards	All
HO Racing	Toyota	11	Hugo Oliveras	All
HO Racing	Toyota	15	Salvador Durán	1–13
HO Racing	Toyota	15	Scott Riggs	14
HO Racing	Toyota	60	Rogelio López	All
Tame Racing	Ford	12	Rubén Pardo	
Tame Racing	Ford	13	Estefania Reyes	
Tame Racing	Ford	22	Irwin Vences	
Tame Racing	Ford	23	Oscar Ruíz	
Tame Racing	Ford	28	Elliot VanRankin	
Team GP	Mazda	18	Rafael Martínez	All
Team GP	Mazda	19	Freddy Tame, Jr.	
Team GP	Mazda	31	Jorge Goeters	All

Driver changes

- Rogelio López left Equipo Telcel. Alejandro Capín took his seat.
- Ricardo Pérez de Lara joined 2b Racing since Round 2.
- After Round 6, Daniel Suárez replaced Alejandro Capín in Equipo Telcel.
- Salvador Durán was suspended after Round 13 for aggressive driving. He was replaced by Scott Riggs.

== Schedule ==
2010 venues

The schedule was presented in January comprised 14 races in 8 tracks. On May 22 Chiapas was the first night race in the NCS history. The Award ceremony was held on December 9.

Race	Race Name	Track	Date	Time	
Race	Race Name	Track	Date	Local	UTC
1	Pennzoil 240	Autódromo Internacional de Aguascalientes, Aguascalientes	March 21	13:10	19:10
2	Querétaro 200	Autódromo Querétaro, El Marqués	April 11	13:10	18:10
3	San Luis Potosí 200	(San Luis Potosí) Autódromo Potosino, Zaragoza	May 2	13:10	18:10
4	Pennzoil 240	Autódromo Chiapas, Berriozábal	May 22	22:00	03:00
5	Pennzoil 200	Autódromo Hermanos Rodríguez, Mexico City	June 6	13:10	18:10
6	Puebla 240	(Puebla) Autódromo Miguel E. Abed, Amozoc	July 18	13:10	18:10
7	Goodyear Racing 200	(Jalisco) Trióvalo Bernardo Obregón, Guadalajara	August 8	13:10	18:10
8	200 km por Monterrey	(Nuevo León) Autódromo Monterrey, Apodaca	August 22	13:10	18:10
9	San Luis Potosí 200	(San Luis Potosí) Autódromo Potosino, Zaragoza	September 5	13:10	18:10
10	Pennzoil 200	Autódromo Hermanos Rodríguez, Mexico City	September 19	13:10	18:10
11	Goodyear Racing 200	Autódromo Querétaro, El Marqués	October 3	13:10	18:10
12	Puebla 240	(Puebla) Autódromo Miguel E. Abed, Amozoc	October 17	13:10	18:10
13	Goodyear Racing 240	Autódromo Chiapas, Berriozábal	October 31	12:10	18:10
14	Pennzoil 240	Autódromo Internacional de Aguascalientes, Aguascalientes	November 21	13:10	19:10

Oval
Road Course

== Results and standings ==
=== Races ===
No.	Race	Pole position	Most laps led	Winning driver	Winning manufacturer
1	Aguascalientes	Rogelio López	Rogelio López	Rafael Martínez	Mazda
2	Querétaro	Rafael Martínez	Rafael Martínez	Rafael Martínez	Mazda
3	San Luis Potosí	Homero Richards	Homero Richards	Jorge Goeters	Mazda
4	Chiapas	Salvador Durán	Germán Quiroga	Germán Quiroga	Ford
5	Mexico City	Homero Richards	Homero Richards	Homero Richards	Toyota
6	Puebla	Antonio Pérez^{1}	Homero Richards	Homero Richards	Toyota
7	Guadalajara	Germán Quiroga	Jorge Goeters	Antonio Pérez	Chevrolet
8	Monterrey	Jorge Goeters	Rubén Rovelo	Rubén Rovelo	Toyota
9	San Luis Potosí	Jorge Goeters	Jorge Goeters	Germán Quiroga	Ford
10	Mexico City	Antonio Pérez^{2}	Rubén Rovelo	Rubén Rovelo	Toyota
11	Querétaro	Germán Quiroga	Rafael Martínez	Antonio Pérez	Chevrolet
12	Puebla	Rafael Martínez	Jorge Goeters	Germán Quiroga	Dodge
13	Chiapas	José Luis Ramírez	José Luis Ramírez	José Luis Ramírez	Chevrolet
14	Aguascalientes	Jorge Arteaga	Jorge Goeters	Jorge Goeters	Mazda

1 Qualifying cancelled by rain.
2 Qualifying cancelled by rain.

=== Standings ===
(key) Bold - Pole position awarded by time. Italics - Pole position set by final practice results or rainout. * – Most laps led.

Rank	Driver	AGS	QRO	SLP	TXG	MXC	PUE	GDL	MTY	SL2	MX2	QR2	PU2	TX2	AG2	Points
1	Germán Quiroga	23	4	5	1*	2	20	**2**	9	1	3	2	1	15	4	2173
2	Homero Richards	14	2	**4***	21	**1***	1*	10	3	30	4	19	2	13	6	2023
3	Rafael Martínez	1	**1***	27	2	8	21	30	4	13	2	28	4	2	2	1966
4	Antonio Pérez	2	3	8	7	3	**2**	1	14	9	25	1	25	29	17	1941
5	Jorge Goeters	4	19	1	22	11	26	14*	**2**	**12***	26	3^{3}	3	32	1	1880
6	Rubén Rovelo	17	7	7	6	5	19	13	1*	24	1	33	5	4	33	1831
7	José Luis Ramírez	24	12	11	26	16	3	16	12	28	5	5^{3}	9	1	5	1812
8	Jorge Arteaga	9	29	10	23	10	17	12	11	6	11	14	12	7	3	1803
9	Rogelio López	**3***	24	14	4	25	5	4	6	33	10	4^{3}	7	11	32	1791
10	Patrick Goeters	5	8	3	5	30	24	17	8	11	9	15	16	25	23	1743
11	Hugo Oliveras	13	9	19	28	9	8	11	25	4	19	11	13	3	21	1719
12	Abraham Calderón	6	13	24	18	20	6	15	22	22	8	6	15	22	8	1693
13	Daniel Suárez **(R)**	12	17	17	29	18	29	6	5	20	7	7	26	6	12	1684
14	Irwin Vences	11	18	26	10	13	4	22	29	14	29	13	8	5	11	1665
15	Carlos Contreras	10	10	21	19	29	7	19	13	25	12	DNQ	11	9	9	1649
16	Carlos Peralta	19	11	6	24	6	25	3	20	5	23	31	21	8	25	1616
17	Ricardo Pérez de Lara		16	12	14	7	18	9	27	7	30	9	14	10	10	1593
18	Freddy Tame, Jr.	22	5	2	8	14	28	29	18	21	18	8	20	30	27	1558
19	Rubén Pardo	27	31	31	11	4	30	31	23	2	21	12	6	16	24	1487
20	Víctor Barrales	15	20	28	20	12	13	26	24	8	31	16	19	18	19	1481
21	Pepe Montaño	30	32	15	17	31	10	8	32	17	15	10	22	17	16	1471
22	Alejandro Capín	20	14	25	12	15	15	5	21	DNQ	33	32	10	24	29	1415
23	Salvador Durán	25	25	9	**3**	24	22	33	10	3	13	29	29	28	EX	1400
24	Rafael Vallina	26	26	16	13	32	33	25	34	10	20	17	17	14	14	1389
25	Elliot Van Rankin	31	22	18		21	32	7	15	26	28	18	18	12	26	1298
26	Rubén García Novoa	16	30	DNQ	31	26	31	27	16	23	14	24	28	21	13	1277
27	Alan Williams **(R)**	33		13	25	22	14	21	17	31	17	23	24	27	22	1237
28	Oscar Ruíz	7	6	32	9	28	9	24	7	32	6					1177
29	Oscar Peralta	8	21	20	15	DNQ		23	19	34	24	30	32	33	7	1165
30	Israel Jaitovich		15	30	27	27		28	28	19	22	26	34	20	34	1096
31	Mike Sánchez	28	35	22	16	19	11	18	26	29	16	25				1058
32	Julían Islas	32	34	23	30	23	35			DNQ	32	DNQ	33	31		763
33	Enrique Contreras III **(R)**		23							18	34	21		19	15	588
34	Carlos Anaya			29		33	23	20		16	27					534
35	Juan Carlos Herrero **(R)**	29		DNQ	33									23	18	407
36	Jorge Contreras		28		32	17						22	DNQ			374
37	Luis Felipe Montaño	21											27	26	20	370
38	Héctor Félix **(R)**								31	27		20	30		31	328
39	Estefania Reyes						27			DNQ		DNQ	23	DNQ	30	294
40	Rodrigo Marbán **(R)**								29	DNQ		27	31	DNQ		279
41	Juan Carlos Blum **(R)**		DNQ				12			15						245
42	Pepe González	18	33					32								240
43	Ernesto Guerrero **(R)**		27	DNQ												140
44	Rodrigo Peralta **(R)**						16									115
45	Scott Riggs														28	79
46	Héctor González **(R)**								33							64
Rank	Driver	AGS	QRO	SLP	TXG	MXC	PUE	GDL	MTY	SL2	MX2	QR2	PU2	TX2	AG2	Points
	References															

Goeters, Ramírez and López suffered 15 points reduction by drive shaft irregularities.

=== Rookie of the Year ===
Only the best 10 results count in the final classification.

Rank	Driver	AGS	QRO	SLP	TXG	MXC	PUE	GDL	MTY	SL2	MX2	QR2	PU2	TX2	AG2	Points
1	Daniel Suárez	12	17	17	29	18	29	6	5	20	7	7	26	6	12	96
2	Alan Williams	33		13	25	22	14	21	17	31	17	23	24	27	22	90
3	Enrique Contreras III		23							18	34	21		19	15	26
4	Juan Carlos Herrero	29		DNQ	33									23	18	25
5	Rodrigo Marban								29	DNQ		27	31	DNQ		26
6	Héctor Félix								31	27		20	30		31	29
7	Juan Carlos Blum		DNQ				12			15						20
8	Ernesto Guerrero		27	DNQ												15
9	Rodrigo Peralta						16									8
10	Héctor González									33						6
Rank	Driver	AGS	QRO	SLP	TXG	MXC	PUE	GDL	MTY	SL2	MX2	QR2	PU2	TX2	AG2	Points

== See also ==
- 2010 NASCAR Sprint Cup Series
- 2010 NASCAR Nationwide Series
- 2010 NASCAR Camping World Truck Series
- 2010 ARCA Racing Series
- 2010 NASCAR Whelen Modified Tour
- 2010 NASCAR Whelen Southern Modified Tour
- 2010 NASCAR Canadian Tire Series
- 2010 NASCAR Mini Stock Series
