= Rodrigo Peralta =

Mexican stock car racing driver

- Born: March 22, 1988 (age 38); Mexico City
- Achievements: 2013 NASCAR Toyota Series champion

NASCAR Mexico Series career
- 58 races run over 6 years
- Best finish: 1st (2013)
- First race: 2010 Puebla 240 (Amozoc)
- Last race: 2015 RedCo 240 (Chiapas)
- First win: 2013 Aguascalientes 240 (Aguascalientes)
- Last win: 2015 Queretana 200 (Querétaro)
Wins	Top tens	Poles
2	25	1

Rodrigo Peralta (born March 22, 1988) is a Mexican former stock car racing driver. Peralta won the 2013 NASCAR Toyota Series championship by eight points over Daniel Suarez. He competed in 58 NASCAR Mexico series races between 2010 and 2015. During his NASCAR career, Peralta won two races, had 25 top-ten finishes, and one pole position.

== Motorsports career results ==
=== NASCAR ===
(key) (Bold – Pole position awarded by qualifying time. Italics – Pole position earned by points standings or practice time. * – Most laps led.)

==== PEAK Mexico Series ====
NASCAR PEAK Mexico Series results
Year	Team	No.	Make	1	2	3	4	5	6	7	8	9	10	11	12	13	14	15	NPMSC	Pts	Ref
2010	2B Racing	10		AGS	QRO	SLP	TXG	MXC	PUE	GDL	MTY	SLP	MXC	QRO	PUE; 16	TXG	AGS		44th	115	
2011	Tame Racing	09	Toyota	MTY	SLP	AGS	TUX	QRO	PUE	MXC; 28	SLP	MTY	QRO	PUE	SLP; 27	AGS; 20			41st	428	
2011	Tame Racing	17	Toyota														MXC; 19		41st	428	
2012	Tame Racing	17	Ford	MTY; 7	SLP; 15	QRO; 33	MXC; 15	PUE; 20	AGS	MXC	SLP	QRO	AGS; 33	PUE; 11	MTY; 26	CHI	MXC; 21		29th	215	
2013	Denisse Guaida	24	Ford	PHO	SLP; 16	MXC; 7	QRO; 5	CHI; 10	AGS; 7	PUE; 2	MTY; 6	QRO; 16	MXC; 2	SLP; 8	PUE; 5	AGS; 1	TUX; 11	MXC; 4	1st	1198	
2014	Denisse Guaida	24	Toyota	PHO; 2	MXC; 12	TUX; 7	MTY; 20	SLP; 12	QRO; 31	MXC; 22	AGS; 18	QRO; 29	PUE; 29	CHI; 14	SLP; 15	AGS; 20	TUX; 3		18th	408	
2014	Denisse Guaida	24	Ford															PUE; 20	18th	408	
2015	Denisse Guaida	24	Ford	PHO; 23	SLP; 10	TUX; 29	**QRO**; 1*	PUE; 20	AGS; 6	CHI; 4	SLP; 7	PUE; 7	SLP; 14	CHI; 6	AGS; 5	MXC; 15	MXC; 7	TUX; 3	4th	1171	
