= 2012 NASCAR Toyota Series =

2012 NASCAR Toyota Series season
- NASCAR Toyota Series

Season
- Races: 14
- Start date: March 25
- End date: November 11

Awards
- Champion: Jorge Goeters

The 2012 NASCAR Toyota Series was the sixth NASCAR Series and the ninth organized by NASCAR Mexico. It was contested over 14 races. Chihuahua was added to calendar, while Guadalajara which was supposed to return after a one-year hiatus was later cancelled and replaced by Monterrey and Tuxtla Gutiérrez was also removed for the year. Germán Quiroga was the defending Driver's Champion however he left the series to compete in NASCAR Camping World Truck Series.

== Teams and drivers ==
37 drivers competed in the first race.

Team	Manufacturer	No	Race Driver	Rounds
Anvi Motorsport	Toyota	00	Rodrigo Marbán	1–14
Anvi Motorsport	Mazda	26	Israel Jaitovich	1–14
Anvi Motorsport	Toyota	30	Victor Barrales	1–14
Anvi Motorsport	Toyota	40	Héctor Félix	1–14
SC Racing	Toyota	01	Rodrigo Echeverría	1–2
SC Racing	Toyota	01	Waldemar Coronas	3
SC Racing	Toyota	01	Nelson Canache Jr.	13
SC Racing	Chevrolet	03	Patrick Goeters	1–14
SC Racing	Toyota	05	Abraham Calderón	1–14
SC Racing	Toyota	27	Rubén García Novoa	10–11, 14
SC Racing	Toyota	88	Rubén García, Jr.	1–14
Escudería Telmex	Chevrolet	1	Antonio Pérez	1–14
Escudería Telmex	Toyota	5	Rubén Rovelo	1–7
Escudería Telmex	Toyota	5	Salvador Durán	8–14
Equipo Telcel	Dodge	2	Salvador Durán	1–7
Equipo Telcel	Dodge	2	Rubén Rovelo	8–14
Equipo Telcel	Dodge	3	Daniel Suárez	1–14
Equipo Telcel	Dodge	6	Irwin Vences	1–9
2b Racing	Toyota	7	Carlos Peralta	1–14
2b Racing	Toyota	8	Freddy Tame, Jr.	1–14
2b Racing	Toyota	10	Carlos Anaya	1
2b Racing	Toyota	10	Oscar Peralta	2–6, 9, 11
Ramírez Racing	Chevrolet	08	José Luis Ramírez	1–14
Ramírez Racing	Toyota	40	Héctor Félix	1–14
FCV Racing	Toyota	9	Carlos Contreras	1, 10–14
FCV Racing	Dodge	44	Juan Carlos Blum	1–4, 6–14
FCV Racing	Toyota	71	Enrique Contreras III	4, 6
Promopista	Toyota	16	Luis Felipe Montaño	1–14
Promopista		24	Mike Sánchez	1
Promopista	Toyota	24	Jose Gonzalez	14
HO Racing	Toyota	11	Hugo Oliveras	1–14
HO Racing	Toyota	15	Rubén Pardo	1–14
HO Racing	Toyota	48	Rogelio López	1–14
Tame Racing	Toyota	13	Elliot Van Rankin	1–14
Tame Racing	Toyota	17	Rodrigo Peralta	1–5, 10–14
Tame Racing	Toyota	22	Alex Villasana	7–8, 10, 12
Tame Racing	Toyota	22	Hector Aguirre	11
Team GP	Mazda	18	Rafael Martínez	1–14
Team GP	Mazda	31	Jorge Goeters	1–14
H&H Speed	Toyota	20	Homero Richards	1–14
H&H Speed	Ford	29	Javier Razo	1
H&H Speed	Ford	29	Homero Richards	2
H&H Speed	Toyota	29	Héctor Aguirre	5–9
H&H Speed	Toyota	29	Irwin Vences	10–14
AVM3	Chevrolet	23	Héctor Aguirre	1-2
Oscar Ruiz	Toyota	34	Oscar Ruiz	1–5
Escuderia SyD	Toyota	34	Oscar Ruiz	6–14
Escuderia SyD	Toyota	66	Alejandro Capín	1–14
Escuderia SyD	Toyota	96	Alejandro Villasana	1–5
Escuderia SyD	Toyota	96	Oscar Torres, Jr.	8, 10
MT Sports Marketing	Toyota	36	Pepe Montano	1-14
CEDVA Racing	Toyota	55	Jorge Contreras, Jr.	1–10
Car Motion Motorsport	Toyota	69	Javier Fernandez	3-11, 13-14
Spartac RT	Chevrolet	77	Rafael Vallina	1–14

=== Driver changes ===
- Three time champion Germán Quiroga left the category and his place in the Equipo Telcel. Salvador Durán took his seat.
- Jorge Arteaga moved to K&N Pro Series East.
- Javier Razo ran with H&H Speed in the first two races.
- Héctor Félix began the season with Ramírez Racing, but changed to Anvi Motorsports after three races.
- Oscar Ruíz was incorporated to Suspension y Dirección team for the race in Aguascalientes.

== 2012 calendar ==
The schedule was presented on January 19 with fourteen races in eight venues. Chihuahua debuted with a race at the El Dorado Speedway. Guadalajara was supposed to return after a year absence, however it was cancelled and replaced by Monterrey and Tuxtla Gutiérrez was also removed for the year.

2012 NTS venues.

No.	Race Title	Track	Date	Time	
No.	Race Title	Track	Date	Local	UTC
1	Regia 200	(Nuevo León) Autódromo Monterrey, Apodaca	March 25	13:30	19:30
2	Potosina 200	(San Luis Potosí) Autódromo Potosino, Zaragoza	April 15	13:30	18:30
3	Queretana 200	Autódromo Querétaro, El Marqués	April 29	13:30	18:30
4	Nocturna 200^{‡}	Autódromo Hermanos Rodríguez, Mexico City	May 13	20:30	01:30
5	Puebla 240	Autódromo Miguel E. Abed, Puebla	May 27	13:30	18:30
6	Aguascalientes 240	Autódromo Internacional de Aguascalientes, Aguascalientes	June 17	13:30	18:30
7	Mexico Fest 200	Autódromo Hermanos Rodríguez, Mexico City	July 7	12:30	18:30
8	Potosina 200	(San Luis Potosí) Autódromo Potosino, Zaragoza	July 29	TBD	TBD
9	Queretana 200	Autódromo Querétaro, El Marqués	August 12	TBD	TBD
10	Aguascalientes 240	Autódromo Internacional de Aguascalientes, Aguascalientes	August 26	TBD	TBD
11	Puebla 240	(Puebla) Autódromo Miguel E. Abed, Amozoc	September 9	TBD	TBD
12	Regia 200	(Nuevo León) Autódromo Monterrey, Apodaca	September 30	TBD	TBD
13	Chihuahua 200	(Chihuahua (state)) El Dorado Speedway, Chihuahua	October 28	TBD	TBD
14	Mexico Final 200	Autódromo Hermanos Rodríguez, Mexico City	November 11	TBD	TBD

Oval
Road Course

‡ Night Race

== Season summary ==
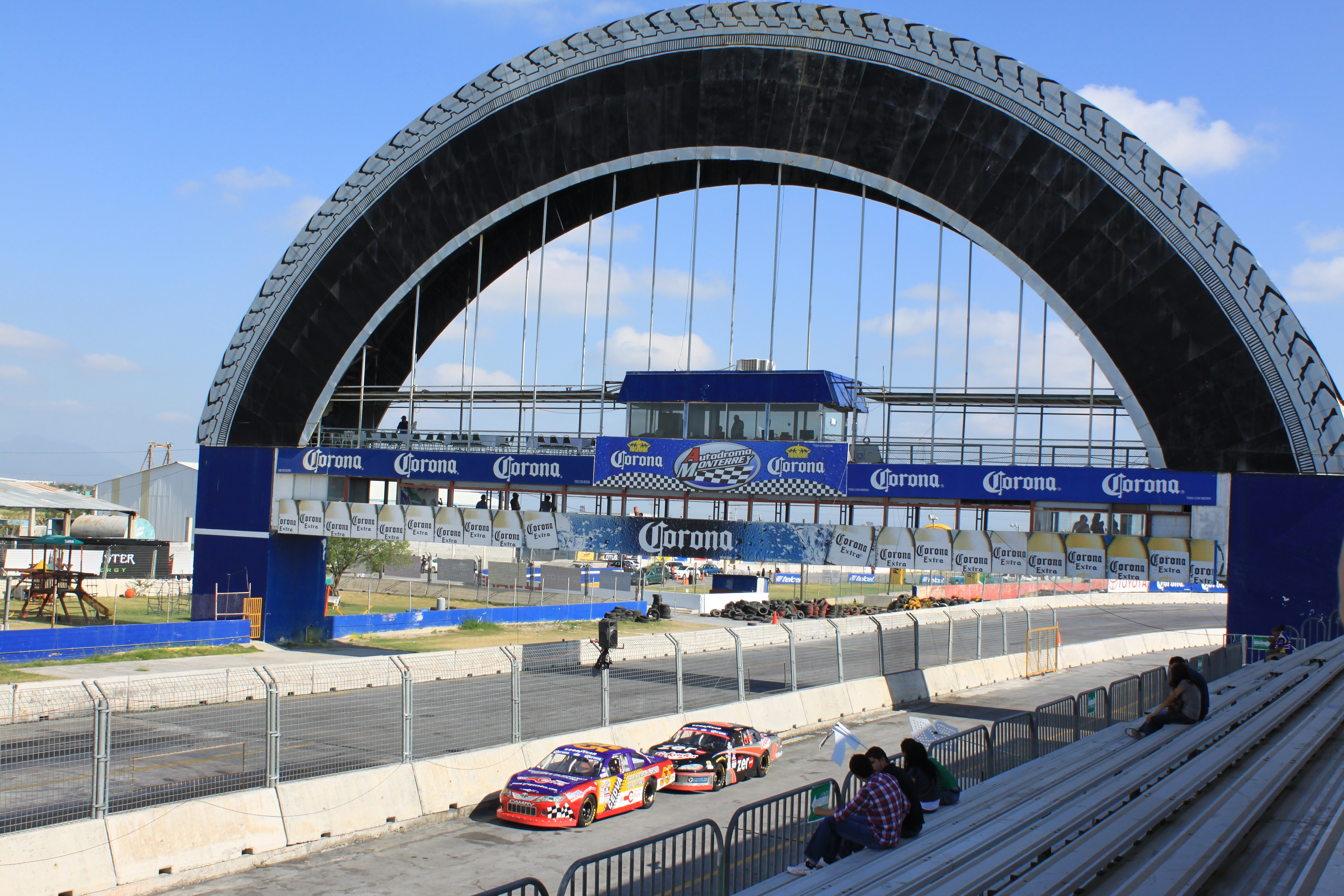
Autódromo Monterrey venue for the kick-off race.

The season began in Monterrey with the Regia 200. 37 drivers registered for the event; however an important absentee was the triple champion Germán Quiroga. Additionally, the most popular driver winner, Jorge Arteaga, left the series. The race was marked by an accident that involved ten cars, which included Homero Richards who abandoned the race as a result. In the final lap, Rubén Rovelo passed Daniel Suárez to take the victory.

In the second race at Autódromo Potosino, Antonio Pérez started in fifth position and took the victory. Also in the race, Homero Richards had to drive the car of his teammate, Javier Razo, due to the breakdown of Richards' car.

In race three at Querétaro, Homero Richards achieved his tenth victory in the NTS in a GWC. The race was run 9 laps in excess. Rogelio López became the leader with a two point of advantage over Daniel Suárez.

Nocturna 200 was the fourth race in the season. Rogelio López took the pole position, and Daniel Suárez ultimately won the race. This was Suárez' first victory in NTS and he reached the number one position in the championship.

In the fifth race, Rubén García, Jr. (son of Rubén García Novoa), took his first pole position. García Jr clocked the track in 39.093 at 115.10 mph and became the youngest pole-sitter in NTS aged 16. Jorge Goeters won the race in a GWC final. Goeters also took the first place in the championship, 11 points ahead of Daniel Suárez.

In the Aguascalientes 240, Antonio Pérez became the first driver to win two races in the season. Daniel Suárez came in second and Jorge Goeters finished third. In the championship, Suárez reduced his disadvantage to Goeters to nine points.

== Results and standings ==
=== Races ===
No.	Race	Pole position	Most laps led	Winning driver	Winning manufacturer
1	Regia 200	Abraham Calderón	Rubén Rovelo	Rubén Rovelo	Toyota
2	Potosina 200	Daniel Suárez	Antonio Pérez	Antonio Pérez	Chevrolet
3	Queretana 200	José Luis Ramírez	Homero Richards	Homero Richards	Toyota
4	Nocturna 200	Rogelio López	Homero Richards	Daniel Suárez	Dodge
5	Puebla 240	Rubén García, Jr.	Jorge Goeters	Jorge Goeters	Mazda
6	Aguascalientes 240	Rogelio López	Antonio Pérez	Antonio Pérez	Chevrolet
7	Mexico Fest 200	Homero Richards	Homero Richards	Hugo Oliveras	Toyota
8	Potosina 200	Homero Richards	Homero Richards	Rafael Martínez	Mazda
9	Queretana 200	Daniel Suárez	Homero Richards	Daniel Suárez	Dodge
10	Aguascalientes 240	Daniel Suárez	Antonio Pérez	Rubén Rovelo	Toyota
11	Puebla 240	Rogelio López	Rogelio López	Rogelio López	Toyota
12	Regia 200	José Luis Ramírez	José Luis Ramírez	Jorge Goeters	Mazda
13	Chihuahua 200	Rubén Rovelo	Daniel Suárez	Rubén Pardo	Toyota
14	Mexico Final 200	Homero Richards	Homero Richards	Homero Richards	Toyota

=== Drivers ===
Pos.	Driver	Races														Points
Pos.	Driver	MTY	SLP	QRO	MXC	PUE	AGS	MX2	SL2	QR2	AG2	PU2	MT2	CHI	MX3	Points
1	Jorge Goeters	3	4	20	5	1*	3	22	4	6	3	2	1	8	8	539
2	Homero Richards	23	5	1*	3*	17	6	**4***	**19***	23*	6	8	5	11	**1***	505
3	Daniel Suárez	12	**3**	2	1	25	2	5	2	**1**	**2**	15	3	30*	25	504
4	Rubén Pardo	24	23	8	8	4	5	20	8	19	4	3	12	1	5	478
5	Antonio Pérez	6	1*	24	7	16	1*	31	7	8	20*	25	6	3	6	472
6	Hugo Oliveras	22	32	15	21	10	11	1	10	2	7	4	8	5	14	461
7	Patrick Goeters	4	7	19	14	3	8	6	21	32	10	9	2	13	9	461
8	Rafael Martínez	27	2	23	2	14	4	17	1	3	31	6	27	9	10	447
9	José Luis Ramírez	17	8	**6**	9	8	28	8	9	7	12	7	**16***	31	11	446
10	Rubén Rovelo	1*	9	21	4	11	16	29	26	4	1	29	15	**2**	20	437
11	Abraham Calderón	**2**	17	34	12	29	15	3	6	5	9	5	23	22	2	436
12	Freddy Tame, Jr.	20	10	12	13	9	9	12	23	9	13	27	4	4	18	433
13	Rogelio López	5	6	3	**6**	31	**26**	2	17	25	15	**1***	30	19	7	429
14	Rubén García, Jr. **(R)**	8	27	7	11	**6**	7	17	24	10	26	17	24	10	3	416
15	Salvador Durán	18	11	22	26	18	14	15	5	12	5	22	10	7	22	410
16	Irwin Vences	26	14	4	10	27	12	7	30	11	8	10	7	27	15	409
17	Carlos Peralta	9	13	10	22	7	23	13	22	20	16	14	11	14	16	406
18	Juan Carlos Blum **(R)**	14	19	11	31		10	9	15	17	14	23	13	24	27	345
19	Elliot VanRankin	15	29	9	25	13	13	10	31	27	30	28	9	29	4	342
20	Luis Felipe Montaño	25	33	14	19	5	24	11	18	14	11	34	29	18	31	330
21	Rafael Vallina	16	21	31	29	19	22	30	13	18	19	12	19	15	30	322
22	Pepe Montaño	32	12	27	16	32	25	24	12	21	22	13	31	21	12	317
23	Víctor Barrales	13	31	17	23	26	20	28	14	26	21	19	22	20	24	312
24	Alejandro Capín	28	16	5	27	21	27	26	28	13	27	16	28	26	17	311
25	Héctor Félix	10	25	29	30	28	17	25	29	16	17	20	25	12	23	310
26	Óscar Ruíz	31	18	25	20	24	21	32	11	15	30	32	14	16	19	309
27	Israel Jaitovich	11	24	16	24	16	30	21	16	22	25	31	17	23	32	309
28	Rodrigo Marbán	19	26	18	17	22	18	16	33	31	29	26	18	25	26	292
29	Rodrigo Peralta **(R)**	7	15	33	15	20					33	11	26		21	215
30	Alejandro Villasana **(R)**	DNQ^{1}	20	28	28	12		14	20		23		20			194
31	Javier Fernandez **(R)**			30	34	23	19	23	32	24	35	30		17	33	184
32	Jorge Contreras, Jr.	DNQ^{1}	22	26	33	33	32	19	25	29	28					158
33	Héctor Aguirre **(R)**	30	28			2	Wth	27	3	30		33				155
34	Carlos Contreras	33									18	24	21	6	29	134
35	Óscar Peralta		30	32	18	30	31			28		21				118
36	Rubén García Novoa										32	18			28	54
37	Óscar Torres, Jr. **(R)**									27	24					37
38	Waldemar Coronas **(R)**			13												31
39	José González														13	31
40	Enrique Contreras III				32		29									27
41	Rodrigo Echeverría **(R)**	29	34													25
42	Xavier Razo **(R)**	21	Wth													24
43	Nelson Canache													28		16
44	Mike Sánchez	DNQ^{1}														10
45	Carlos Anaya	DNQ^{1}														8
Pos.	Driver	MTY	SLP	QRO	MXC	PUE	AGS	MX2	SL2	QR2	AG2	PU2	MT2	CHI	MX3	Points
References																

- ^{1} – Alejandro Villasana, Jorge Contreras, Jr., Mike Sánchez and Carlos Anaya received championship points, despite the fact that they did not qualify for the race.

=== Rookie of the Year ===
Pos.	Driver	MTY	SLP	QRO	MXC	PUE	AGS	MX2	SL2	QR2	AG2	PU2	MT2	CHI	MX3	Points
1	Rubén García, Jr.	8	27	7	11	6	7	17	24	10	26	17	24	10	3	63
2	Juan Carlos Blum	14	19	11	31		10	9	15	17	14	23	13	24	27	52
3	Alejandro Villasana	DNQ	20	28	28	12		14	20		23		20			44
4	Rodrigo Peralta	7	15	33	15	20					33	11	26		21	41
5	Javier Fernandez			30	34	23	19	23	32	24	35	30		17	30	33
6	Héctor Aguirre	30	28			2	Wth	27	3	30		33				27
7	Óscar Torres, Jr.								27		24					11
7	Rodrigo Echeverría	29	34													11
8	Waldemar Coronas			13												8
9	Javier Razo	21	Wth													7
Pos.	Driver	MTY	SLP	QRO	MXC	PUE	AGS	MX2	SL2	QR2	AG2	PU2	MT2	CHI	MX3	Points

Key
Color	Result
Gold	Winner
Silver	Finished 2nd–5th
Bronze	Finished 6th–10th
Green	Finished 11th–20th
Blue	Finished 21st or worse
Purple	Did not finish (DNF)
Black	Disqualified (DSQ)
Red	Did not qualify (DNQ)
Tan	Withdrew From Race (Wth)
White	Qualified for another driver (QL)
White	Qualified but replaced due to injury or incident (INQ)
White	Relieved another driver (RL)
Blank	Did not participate (DNP)
Blank	Excluded (EX)
Blank	Did not arrive (DNA)

**Bold** – Pole position awarded by time.
* – Most laps led.

== See also ==
- 2012 NASCAR Sprint Cup Series
- 2012 NASCAR Nationwide Series
- 2012 NASCAR Camping World Truck Series
- 2012 NASCAR K&N Pro Series East
- 2012 ARCA Racing Series
- 2012 NASCAR Whelen Modified Tour
- 2012 NASCAR Whelen Southern Modified Tour
- 2012 NASCAR Canadian Tire Series
- 2012 NASCAR Stock V6 Series
- 2012 Racecar Euro Series
