= EcoCentro Expositor Querétaro =

Exposition center in El Marqués, Quéretaro, Mexico

The EcoCentro Expositor Querétaro is an exposition center located in El Marqués, Quéretaro, near the state's capital of Santiago de Querétaro. The Ecocentro was opened in 2001 by then president Vicente Fox. The venue notably features an arena and numerous motorsport facilities, including an oval and a karting track.

It currently hosts the annual Querétaro fair in November/December, the El Marqués fair, and the NASCAR Mexico Series.

== Track ==
Autódromo de Quéretaro
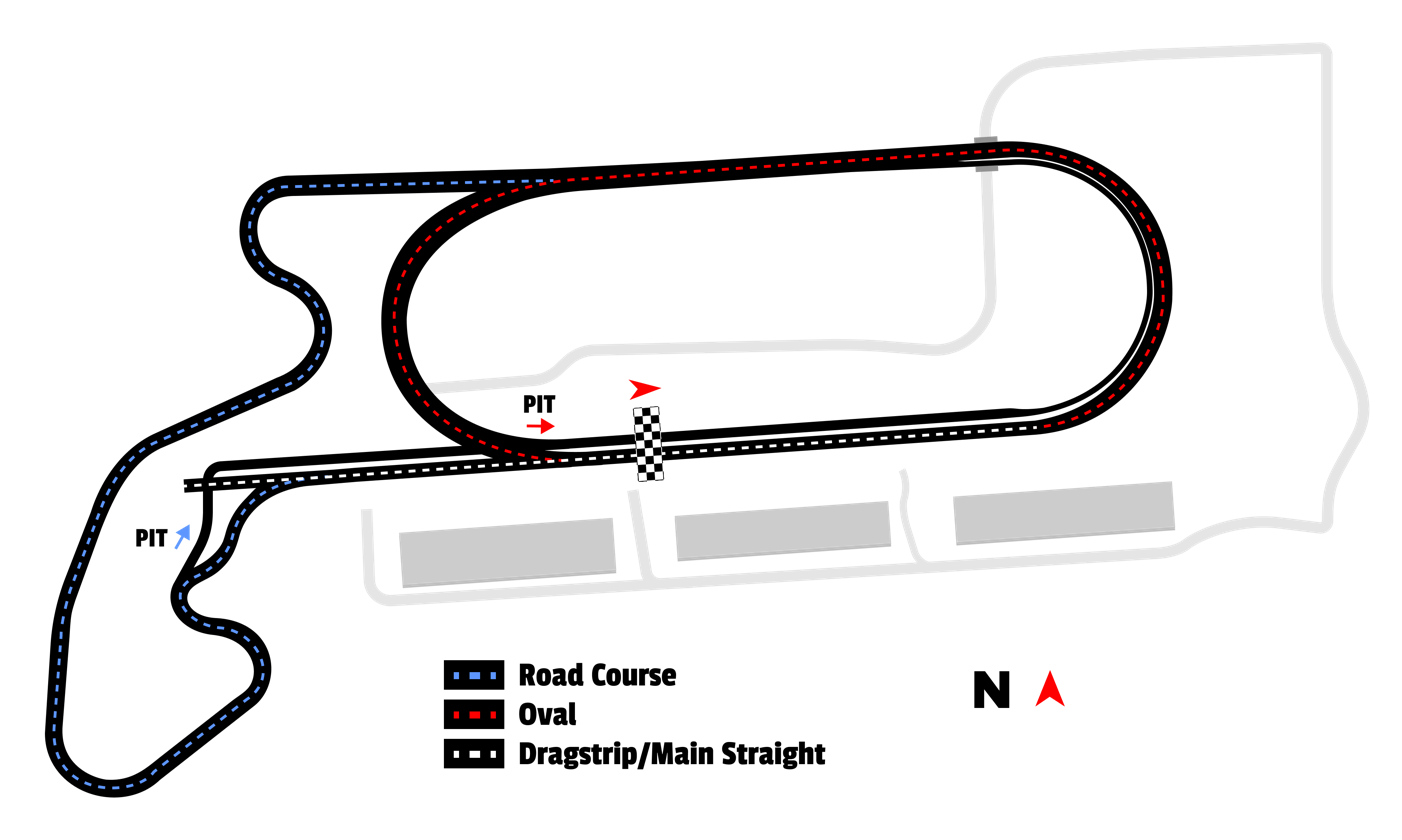
- Full Circuit (2008–present)
- Location: El Marqués, Mexico
- Coordinates: 20°35′11″N 100°19′41″W
- Opened: 30 March 2008; 18 years ago
- Major events: Current: NASCAR Mexico Querétaro 200 (2008–present); Former: NACAM F4 (2020, 2022–2023); Fórmula Panam (2013, 2015–2016, 2018); LATAM Challenge Series (2008–2011, 2013)

Full Circuit (2008–present)
- Surface: Asphalt
- Length: 2.314 km (1.438 mi)
- Turns: 9
- Race lap record: 0:56.353 ( (Mexico) Rudy Camarillo, Tatuus FA010, 2013, Formula Abarth)

Oval (2008–present)
- Surface: Asphalt
- Length: 1.283 km (0.797 mi)
- Turns: 4
- Race lap record: 0:29.363 ( (Mexico) Alex de Alba, Chevrolet Camaro NASCAR, 2024, Stock car racing)

The track was inaugurated on 30 March 2008 to become the new premier racing facility in Querétaro, replacing a track with the same name that had hosted the NASCAR Mexico Series from 2004 to 2007. The oval layout was later inaugurated in October 2009.

The track has two layouts; a road course with a length of 1.438 mi (2.314 km) and an oval with a length of 0.797 mi (1.283 km). The oval has a paper clip shape with turn 1-2 having no banking and turns 3-4 being slightly banked.

The two layouts share the same Turns 1-2, before the road course splits off into a double hairpin and esses complex — it rejoins the oval layout on the main straight, which is also used as a 0.700 km (0.435 mi) dragstrip where 1/8 mile events are held regularly.

The track has hosted the NASCAR Mexico Series, the Copa Pirelli, the LATAM Challenge Series, the Super Copa Telcel, and CARreras.

=== NASCAR Mexico Series ===
Waldemar Coronas from Argentina became the first foreign driver to win at this circuit in this category. As of 2025, Rafael Martínez has the most wins at Quéretaro with 6.

Year	Date	Driver	Configuration	Laps	Miles (Km)
2008	30 March	(Nuevo León) Rafael Martínez	Circuit	52	74.78 (120.35)
2008	31 August	(Argentina) Waldemar Coronas	Circuit	63	90.59 (145.79)
2009	28 June	(Mexico City) Hugo Oliveras	Circuit	68	97.78 (157.36)
2009	11 October	(Mexico City) Rubén Rovelo	Oval	132	105.2 (169.3)
2010	11 April	(Nuevo León) Rafael Martínez	Circuit	75	107.85 (173.57)
2010	3 October	(Jalisco) Antonio Pérez	Oval	160	127.52 (205.22)
2011	5 June	(Mexico City) Homero Richards	Oval	144	107.42 (172.88)
2011	4 September	(Mexico City) Germán Quiroga	Oval	146	108.92 (175.29)
2012	29 April	(Mexico City) Homero Richards	Oval	166	123.84 (199.30)
2012	12 August	(Nuevo León) Daniel Suárez	Oval	157	117.12 (188.49)
2013	21 April	(Nuevo León) Rafael Martínez	Oval	158	118.5 (190.7)
2013	28 July	(Nuevo León) Rafael Martínez	Oval	199	149.25 (240.19)
2014	25 May	(Mexico City) Rubén Pardo	Oval	157	117.75 (189.5)
2014	3 August	(Mexico City) Homero Richards	Oval	157	117.75 (189.5)
2015	17 May	(Mexico City) Rodrigo Peralta	Oval	154	115.5 (185.88)
2017	20 August	(Mexico City) Irwin Vences	Oval	119	89.25 (143.63)
2018	19 August	(Mexico City) Rubén García Jr.	Circuit	33	49.2 (79.18)
2019	4 August	(Jalisco) Salvador de Alba Jr.	Oval	160	127.52 (205.22)
2020	9 July	(Mexico City) Rubén Rovelo	Oval	150	119.55 (192.4)
2020	2 October	(Jalisco) Salvador de Alba Jr.	Circuit	72	107.35 (172.76)
2020	3 October	(Mexico City) Rubén Rovelo	Circuit	72	107.35 (172.76)
2020	27 November	(Mexico City) Rubén García Jr.	Oval	154	122.74 (197.53)
2020	28 November	(Mexico City) Rubén Rovelo	Oval	154	122.74 (197.53)
2021	20 June	(Mexico City) Rubén Rovelo	Oval	142	113.17 (182.13)
2021	5 September	(Jalisco) Salvador de Alba Jr.	Circuit	65	96.92 (155.98)
2022	8 May	(Jalisco) Salvador de Alba Jr.	Oval	121	96.44 (155.21)
2022	9 October	(Mexico City) José Luis Ramírez	Oval	140	111.58 (179.57)
2023	28 May	(Mexico City) Jake Cosío	Oval	130	103.61 (166.74)
2024	11 August	(Mexico City) Irwin Vences	Oval	125	99.63 (160.34)
2024	22 September	(Mexico City) Xavi Razo	Oval	126	100.42 (161.61)
2025	1 June	(San Luis Potosí) Alex de Alba	Oval	140	111.58 (179.57)

== Events ==
Current

- March: Campeonato Mexicano de Súper Turismos Ida y Vuelta
- April: Gran Turismo Mexico
- May: Campeonato Mexicano de Súper Turismos Gran Premio Pedro Rodríguez
- June: NASCAR Mexico Series, NASCAR Mikel's Truck Series
- September: NASCAR Mexico Series, NASCAR Mikel's Truck Series

Former

- Fórmula Panam (2013, 2015–2016, 2018)
- LATAM Challenge Series (2008–2011, 2013)
- NACAM Formula 4 Championship (2020, 2022–2023)

== Lap records ==
As of August 2024, the fastest official race lap records at the EcoCentro Expositor Querétaro are listed as:

Category	Time	Driver	Vehicle	Event
Full Circuit (2008–present): 2.314 km (1.438 mi)
Formula Abarth	0:56.353	Rudy Camarillo	Tatuus FA010	2013 Querétaro Fórmula Panam round
Formula Vee	0:56.937	José Sandoval	Tatuus FR2000 Volkswagen	2013 Querétaro LATAM Challenge round
Formula Renault 2.0	0:58.199	Hugo Oliveras	Tatuus FR2000 Renault	2008 Querétaro LATAM Challenge round
Formula 4	0:58.949	Thomas Nepveu	Mygale M14-F4	2020 2nd Querétaro NACAM F4 round
Stock car racing	1:03.236	Salvador de Alba Jr.	Ford Fusion NASCAR	2021 2nd Querétaro NASCAR Mexico round
TCR Touring Car	1:03.275	Julio Rejón	Cupra León Competición TCR	2024 Querétaro TCR Mexico round
Oval (2008–present): 1.283 km (0.797 mi)
Stock car racing	0:29.363	Alex de Alba	Chevrolet Camaro NASCAR	2024 Commscope 140
