= Jorge Goeters =

Mexican racing driver (born 1970)

- Born: June 26, 1970 (age 56); Mexico City, Mexico
- Awards: 2002 MasterCard Truck Series champion 2005 Desafío Corona champion 2012 NASCAR Toyota Series champion

NASCAR Cup Series career
- 1 race run over 1 year
- First race: 2005 Sirius Satellite Radio at the Glen (Watkins Glen)
Wins	Top tens	Poles
0	0	0

NASCAR O'Reilly Auto Parts Series career
- 10 races run over 3 years
- First race: 2005 Telcel Motorola 200 (Mexico City)
- Last race: 2007 Zippo 200 at the Glen (Watkins Glen)
Wins	Top tens	Poles
0	2	1
- Statistics up to date as of January 11, 2009.

Jorge Goeters (born June 26, 1970) is a Mexican racecar driver.

At the present time, Goeters competes full-time in the NASCAR Mexico Series in Mexico. In the past few years he also competed at the international level on a limited basis, running a handful of races in the NASCAR Nextel Cup Series, NASCAR Busch Series, NASCAR PEAK Mexico Series, Indy Lights, Champ Car World Series, A1 Grand Prix, and Rolex Sports Car Series. He is known for winning the pole position for the inaugural Busch Series race in Mexico City.

== Early career ==
Goeters had an early start in motorsports, beginning in motocross at the age of eight. He won several championships in Mexico, as well as international events in this discipline, before making the move to auto racing in 1993.

In 1996, Goeters won his first national championship, in the Prototypes category. The next year, he won the Mexican Trans-Am series, and in 1998 he went to compete in the United States.

In 1998, Goeters had a fairly successful debut season in the Indy Lights championship, in which he earned one pole position, one track record, two top-fives, and two top-ten finishes.

Back in his homeland, Goeters competed in the Mexican Formula 2 Championship in 2001, and the MasterCard Truck Series Championship in 2002.

In 2004, Goeters took part in the inaugural season of the Desafío Corona stock car series, and finished fourth in the championship.

== Career in NASCAR and other international series ==
In 2004, Goeters entered a NASCAR West Series event at Irwindale Event Center but failed to qualify. In his return to the West Series in 2005, now at Auto Club Speedway, Goeters made the race and finished tenth.

Goetera won the championship in the Desafío Corona series in 2005, and made his NASCAR and Grand-Am debut, as well as his lone start in the Champ Car World Series.

Goeters won a very popular pole position in his NASCAR Busch Series debut during the 2005 Telcel Motorola 200 at Autódromo Hermanos Rodríguez in Mexico City, driving the No. 66 Canel's/Scotiabank Ford Taurus for Brewco Motorsports. He led 24 laps, but later had to retire from the race with an engine failure. He ran two more Busch Series races in 2005, driving the No. 32 Chevy for Braun Racing, with a best result of ninth at Watkins Glen International.

Goeters contested a Champ Car race in Monterrey, Mexico for PKV Racing, but had to retire with mechanical problems on lap 24.

Goeters made his lone NASCAR Nextel Cup Series start at Watkins Glen, driving the No. 50 Dodge for Arnold Motorsports. He led some laps during the race, but eventually finished 35th as a result of small contact in the closing laps.

In 2005, Goeters also competed in the Rolex Sports Car Series event at Watkins Glen.

After his success in the 2005 season, Goeters looked to continue his career in the United States, and in 2006 the announcement was made that he would drive for a new team in the Busch Series, Latin American Racing; however, the team never became a reality. Still, Goeters took part in a handful of races in the Busch Series. He returned to run the Mexico City race with Brewco, finishing fourteenth, and then joined Jay Robinson Racing to drive the No. 49 Ford. He finished 41st at Bristol and 24th at Nashville, but failed to qualify at Las Vegas, Atlanta, Texas, Phoenix and Richmond in the team's underpowered car. Goeters left the team, and then made another start in the season finale at Homestead, driving the No. 63 car for Spraker Racing Enterprises, but retired with mechanical problems.

Also in 2006, Goeters made a start in ARCA Re/Max Series at Chicagoland Speedway driving No. 24 Ford for Bob Schacht Motorsports. Goeters started nineteenth and finished seventh after led four laps.

In 2007, Goeters competed in the NASCAR Busch Series as a road course ringer. He ran at Mexico City, Watkins Glen, and Montreal, with strong qualifying performances in the three races. However, his only good finish came at home as he finished seventh at Mexico City. He also competed in the Rolex Sports Car Series race at Mexico City, and in the opening event of the A1 Grand Prix series for Team Mexico. He also drove full-time in the NASCAR Corona Series, in which he won a race at Guadalajara and finished sixth in the championship.

In 2008, Goeters returned to run full-time in Mexico, and finished 6th in the NASCAR Corona Series, driving the No. 4 car.

During the 97th lap of a one-hundred-lap Corona Series race at Autódromo Miguel E. Abed in Amozoc, Puebla, on June 14, 2009, Goeters made contact with Carlos Pardo, which caused the latter to lose control of his car and impact against a barrier sideways at over 200 km/h causing the disintegration of the car and Pardo's death. As the race was over the time limit, the standings of the previous lap were taken into account and Pardo was posthumously declared winner.

In 2012, Goeters was the champion of NASCAR Toyota Series.

== Personal life ==
Goeters is part of a racing family that also includes his brothers Patrick and Eduardo, who have also competed successfully in several categories in Mexico, including the NASCAR Corona Series.

== Motorsports career results ==
=== Racing career summary ===
Season	Series	Team	Races	Wins	Podium	Poles	Points	Position
1996	Copa Sicrea - Nissan Sport Prototipos	Goeters Racing Team	?	?	?	?	?	**1st**
1997	Formula 3000 Mexico	Goeters Racing Team	9	0	3	0	448	4th
1998	Indy Lights	Quaker State Team Go	12	0	0	1	34	16th
2000	Mexican Formula Three Championship	Contreras Motorsport	9	3	5	6	129	**2nd**
2001	Mexican Formula Three Championship	Contreras Motorsport	9	4	7	6	146	**1st**
2002	Ford Mustang Championship Mexico		?	?	?	?	?	**2nd**
2003	Ford Mustang Championship Mexico	Canel's Racing	?	?	?	?	?	?
2004	Desafío Corona	Canel's Racing	13	1	7	3	2045	4th
2005	Desafío Corona	Team GP	14	4	10	4	2320	**1st**
2005	Champ Car World Series	PKV Racing	1	0	0	0	3	29th
2005	NASCAR Nextel Cup Series	Arnold Motorsports	1	0	0	0	63	82nd
2005	NASCAR Busch Series	Jay Robinson Racing	3	0	0	1	283	82nd
2005	Rolex Sports Car Series - DP	Essex Racing	2	0	0	0	24	69th
2006	NASCAR Busch Series	Spraker Racing	4	0	0	0	295	82nd
2006	ARCA Re/Max Series	Spraker Racing	1	0	0	0	200	109th
2007	NASCAR Corona Series	Xtreme	14	1	1	1	1891	7th
2007	NASCAR Busch Series	Brewco Motorsports	3	0	0	0	297	90th
2007	Rolex Sports Car Series - DP	Doran Racing	3	0	0	0	49	48th
2007-08	A1 Grand Prix	A1 Team Mexico	2	0	0	0	0	16th (1)
2008	NASCAR Corona Series	Spartac RT	14	0	1	1	1896	6th
2009	NASCAR Corona Series	Canel's-Scotiabank-Xtreme	14	1	4	2	1992	**3rd**
2010	NASCAR Corona Series	Team GP	14	2	5	3	1880	5th
2011	NASCAR Corona Series	Canel's Racing	14	2	4	3	1942	3rd
2011	Super Copa Telcel	Bardahl	16	1	5	0	1189	6th
2012	NASCAR Toyota Series	Canel's Racing	14	2	6	0	539	**1st**
2013	NASCAR Toyota Series	FICREA-Xtreme-Potosinos	15	0	0	1	403	18th
2013	Super Copa Telcel		2	0	0	0	142	18th
2014	NASCAR Toyota Series	FICREA	15	0	0	0	434	16th
2015	NASCAR México Series	Ficrea-Xtreme-Potosinos	14	0	0	0	417	18th
2016	Super Copa Telcel		9	1	3	0	700	6th
2017	NASCAR PEAK México Series	JV Motorsport	12	0	1	1	378	4th
2018	NASCAR PEAK México Series	Cavall 7	12	0	0	0	377	13th
2019	NASCAR PEAK México Series	Escudería Telmex	12	0	2	0	454	4th
2020	NASCAR PEAK México Series		12	0	0	0	413	6th
2021	NASCAR PEAK México Series	Autoforum	12	0	0	0	261	12th
2022	NASCAR México Series		11	0	0	0	178	7th
2025	NASCAR Mexico Series	Z Racing Team	5	0	0	0	190	17th

- (1) = Team standings.

=== American open–wheel racing results ===
(key) (Races in bold indicate pole position) (small number denotes finishing position)

==== Indy Lights ====
Year	Team	1	2	3	4	5	6	7	8	9	10	11	12	13	14	Rank	Points
1998	Quaker State Team Go	MIA; 16	LBH; 15	NZR; 11	**STL**; 5	MIL; 6	DET; 16	POR; 9	CLE; 9	TOR; 7	MIS; 21	TRS; 15	VAN	LAG	FON; 20	16th	34

==== Champ Car ====
Year	Team	No.	1	2	3	4	5	6	7	8	9	10	11	12	13	Rank	Points	Ref
2005	PKV Racing	52	LBH	MTY; 18	MIL	POR	CLE	TOR	EDM	SJO	DEN	MTL	LVG	SRF	MXC	29th	3	

=== NASCAR ===
(key) (Bold – Pole position awarded by qualifying time. Italics – Pole position earned by points standings or practice time. * – Most laps led.)

==== Nextel Cup Series ====
NASCAR Nextel Cup Series results
Year	Team	No.	Make	1	2	3	4	5	6	7	8	9	10	11	12	13	14	15	16	17	18	19	20	21	22	23	24	25	26	27	28	29	30	31	32	33	34	35	36	NNCC	Pts	Ref
2005	Arnold Motorsports	50	Dodge	DAY	CAL	LVS	ATL	BRI	MAR	TEX	PHO	TAL	DAR	RCH	CLT	DOV	POC	MCH	SON	DAY	CHI	NHA	POC	IND	GLN; 35	MCH	BRI	CAL	RCH	NHA	DOV	TAL	KAN	CLT	MAR	ATL	TEX	PHO	HOM	82nd	63	

==== Busch Series ====
NASCAR Busch Series results
Year	Team	No.	Make	1	2	3	4	5	6	7	8	9	10	11	12	13	14	15	16	17	18	19	20	21	22	23	24	25	26	27	28	29	30	31	32	33	34	35	NBSC	Pts	Ref
2005	Brewco Motorsports	66	Ford	DAY	CAL	**MXC**; 38	LVS	ATL	NSH	BRI	TEX	PHO	TAL	DAR	RCH	CLT	DOV	NSH	KEN	MLW	DAY	CHI	NHA																82nd	283	
2005	Braun Racing	32	Chevy																					PPR; 24	GTY	IRP	GLN; 9	MCH	BRI	CAL	RCH	DOV							82nd	283	
2005	Red Cactus Racing	73	Chevy																														KAN; DNQ	CLT	MEM	TEX; DNQ	PHO	HOM	82nd	283	
2006	Brewco Motorsports	66	Ford	DAY	CAL	MXC; 14																																	82nd	295	
2006	Jay Robinson Racing	49	Ford				LVS; DNQ	ATL; DNQ	BRI; 41	TEX; DNQ	NSH; 24	PHO; DNQ	TAL																										82nd	295	
2006	Jay Robinson Racing	28	Ford											RCH; DNQ	DAR	CLT	DOV	NSH	KEN	MLW	DAY	CHI	NHA	MAR	GTY	IRP	GLN	MCH	BRI	CAL	RCH	DOV	KAN	CLT	MEM				82nd	295	
2006	Spraker Racing Enterprises	63	Chevy																																	TEX; DNQ	PHO	HOM; 40	82nd	295	
2007	Brewco Motorsports	27	Ford	DAY	CAL	MXC; 7	LVS	ATL	BRI	NSH	TEX	PHO	TAL	RCH	DAR	CLT	DOV	NSH	KEN	MLW	NHA	DAY	CHI	GTY	IRP	CGV; 31	GLN; 29	MCH	BRI	CAL	RCH	DOV	KAN	CLT	MEM	TEX	PHO	HOM	90th	297	

==== West Series ====
NASCAR West Series results
Year	Team	No.	Make	1	2	3	4	5	6	7	8	9	10	11	12	13	NWSC	Pts	Ref
2004	James O'Kane	42	Ford	PHO	MMR	CAL	S99	EVG	IRW	S99	RMR	DCS	PHO	CNS	MMR	IRW; DNQ	69th	76	
2005	Performance P-1 Motorsports	77	Ford	PHO	MMR	PHO	S99	IRW	EVG	S99	PPR	CAL; 10	DCS	CTS	MMR		42nd	134	

Sporting positions
Preceded by First season	MasterCard Truck Series Champion; 2002	Succeeded by César Tiberio Jiménez
Preceded by Carlos Pardo	Desafío Corona Champion; 2005	Succeeded by Rogelio López
Preceded by Germán Quiroga	NASCAR Toyota Series Champion; 2012	Succeeded by Rodrigo Peralta
