= Autódromo Chiapas =

Oval track in Berriozábal, Mexico

Súper Óvalo Chiapas (Autódromo Chiapas)
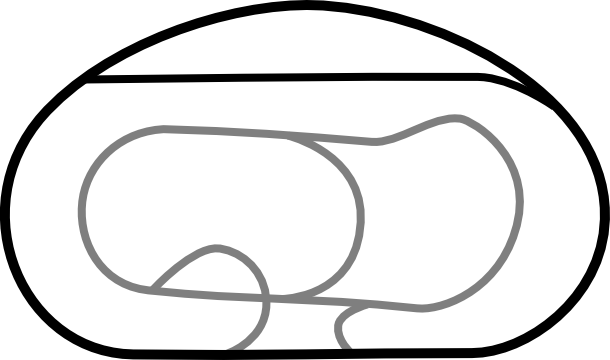
- Oval (2008–present)
- Location: Berriozábal, Chiapas
- Coordinates: 16°46′43″N 93°15′03″W
- Capacity: 17,000
- Opened: 13 October 2008; 17 years ago
- Major events: Current: NASCAR Mexico Series (2008–2011, 2013–2015, 2017–2019, 2021–present); Former: Panam GP Series (2013); LATAM Challenge Series (2010)

Grand Prix Circuit (2008–present)
- Surface: Asphalt
- Length: 2.01 km (1.25 mi)
- Banking: 12°

Oval (2008–present)
- Surface: Asphalt
- Length: 1.21 km (0.75 mi)
- Banking: 12°

Súper Óvalo Chiapas (Autódromo Chiapas) is a tri-oval track in Berriozábal, Chiapas near to Tuxtla Gutiérrez. The venue has a capacity for 17,000 people. The oval has a length of 0.75 mi (1.21 km). Inner configuration has 1.25 mi (2.01 km) of length and 12° of banking in the turns. On October 12, 2008, OSPE was inaugurated with a NASCAR Corona Series race.

The main event in this venue is the NMS. Also hosted local events (karting, touring cars, drag racing).

== Layout ==
The racetrack is a D-shape oval of 0.75 mi (1.21 km) with 12° of banking. The track is run counter-clockwise. This layout is used by NASCAR Mexico Series, since 2008 to 2015.

The main road configuration has 1.25 mi (2.01 km) of length. At the turn 2 exit, the layout enters to infield, and return in previous the turn 3. This layout was used for LATAM Challenge Series in 2010.

== NASCAR Mexico Series ==
Súper Óvalo Chiapas (Autódromo Chiapas) has been venue for the Mexico Series since 2008, and was venue in 2010 for the first night race of this category.

Season	Date	Winner	Laps	Distance (km)
2008	October 12	(Mexico) Antonio Pérez	124	149
2009	May 17	(Mexico) Rogelio López	147	176
2009	November 8	(Mexico) Homero Richards	152	182
2010	May 22	(Mexico) Germán Quiroga	200	240
2010	October 31	(Mexico) José Luis Ramírez	180	216
2011	May 15	(Mexico) Jorge Goeters	200	240
2013	July 13	(Mexico) Rafael Martinez	200	240
2013	October 27	(Mexico) José Luis Ramírez	200	240
2014	April 13	(Mexico) Daniel Suárez	200	240
2014	October 19	(Mexico) Rúben Rovelo	200	240
2015	April 26	(Mexico) Ruben Robelo	200	240
2015	Nov 22	(Mexico) Rogelio López	200	240

== Legal issues ==
Currently OSPE a local company alleged the propriety of the track, but in March 2010 Ocesa through Promotracks took the control of the Autodrómo, because a debt of 93 million pesos. However, since 2011 Promotracks website is down, and the track is near of the abandon.
