= Toyota 120 =

NASCAR Mexico Series
- Venue: Phoenix International Raceway
- Corporate sponsor: Toyota
- First race: 2013
- Last race: 2015
- Distance: 75 mi (121 km)
- Laps: 75

The Toyota 120 was a NASCAR stock car race, competed as part of the NASCAR Mexico Series at Phoenix International Raceway. The inaugural running of the event in 2013 was the first NASCAR Toyota Series race ever held outside Mexico, and served as the season-opening event for the 2013 NASCAR Toyota Series season. The race was scheduled to run for 75 laps, making up a distance of 75 miles (121 km) and is part of the TicketGuardian 500 weekend.

== Past winners ==
Year	Date	Driver	Team	Manufacturer	Race Distance		Race Time	Average Speed (mph)	Ref
Year	Date	Driver	Team	Manufacturer	Laps	Miles (km)	Race Time	Average Speed (mph)	Ref
2013	March 1	Abraham Calderón	SC Racing	Toyota	75	75 (121)	1:00:14	74.709	
2014	February 28	Daniel Suárez	Alejandro Cruz	Toyota	120	120 (193.121)	1:23:51	85.868	
2015	March 13	Rubén Pardo	Rafael Oliveras	Toyota	120	120 (193.121)	1:30:04	79.936	
