= José Luis Ramírez (racing driver) =

Mexican racing driver (born 1979)

- Born: May 8, 1979 (age 47); Mexico City

NASCAR O'Reilly Auto Parts Series career
- 2 races run over 2 years
- Best finish: 124th (2005)
- First race: 2005 Telcel Motorola 200 (Mexico City)
- Last race: 2008 Corona Mexico 200 (Mexico City)
Wins	Top tens	Poles
0	0	0

NASCAR FedEx Freight Truck Series career
- 2 races run over 1 year
- Best finish: 72nd (2005)
- First race: 2005 Sylvania 200 (Loudon)
- Last race: 2005 Chevy Silverado 150 (Phoenix)
Wins	Top tens	Poles
0	0	0
- Statistics up to date as of April 20, 2018.

José Luis Ramírez (born May 8, 1979) is a NASCAR driver. He has attempted to become the fourth Mexican driver to run a Nextel Cup race after Pedro Rodríguez, Al Loquasto, and Jorge Goeters. He attempted a Nextel race in 2005 at Infineon Raceway, but he failed to qualify. He did qualify for two NASCAR Craftsman Truck Series races that season, ending up with a 36th and 29th place finishes. He has two Busch Series starts. His first start was at the Autodromo Hermanos Rodriguez in 2005; he finishing 31st. His second start happened in 2008 when he finished 39th at the same track. He currently is a diversity driver for Team Racing.

== Motorsports career results ==
=== NASCAR ===
(key) (Bold – Pole position awarded by qualifying time. Italics – Pole position earned by points standings or practice time. * – Most laps led.)

==== Nextel Cup Series ====
NASCAR Nextel Cup Series results
Year	Team	No.	Make	1	2	3	4	5	6	7	8	9	10	11	12	13	14	15	16	17	18	19	20	21	22	23	24	25	26	27	28	29	30	31	32	33	34	35	36	NNCC	Pts	Ref
2005	Rick Ware Racing	52	Dodge	DAY	CAL	LVS	ATL	BRI	MAR	TEX	PHO	TAL	DAR	RCH	CLT	DOV	POC	MCH	SON; DNQ	DAY	CHI	NHA	POC	IND	GLN	MCH	BRI	CAL	RCH	NHA	DOV	TAL	KAN	CLT	MAR	ATL	TEX	PHO	HOM	NA	-	

==== Nationwide Series ====
NASCAR Nationwide Series results
Year	Team	No.	Make	1	2	3	4	5	6	7	8	9	10	11	12	13	14	15	16	17	18	19	20	21	22	23	24	25	26	27	28	29	30	31	32	33	34	35	NNSC	Pts	Ref
2005	Curb Agajanian Racing	43	Ford	DAY	CAL	MXC; 31	LVS	ATL	NSH	BRI	TEX	PHO	TAL	DAR	RCH	CLT	DOV	NSH	KEN	MLW	DAY	CHI	NHA	PPR	GTY	IRP	GLN	MCH	BRI	CAL	RCH	DOV	KAN	CLT	MEM	TEX	PHO	HOM	124th	70	
2008	TW Motorsports	84	Dodge	DAY	CAL	LVS	ATL	BRI	NSH	TEX	PHO	MXC; 39	TAL	RCH	DAR	CLT	DOV	NSH	KEN	MLW	NHA	DAY	CHI	GTY	IRP	CGV	GLN	MCH	BRI	CAL	RCH	DOV	KAN	CLT	MEM	TEX	PHO	HOM	142nd	46	

==== Craftsman Truck Series ====
NASCAR Craftsman Truck Series results
Year	Team	No.	Make	1	2	3	4	5	6	7	8	9	10	11	12	13	14	15	16	17	18	19	20	21	22	23	24	25	NCTC	Pts	Ref
2005	Green Light Racing	08	Chevy	DAY	CAL	ATL	MAR	GTY	MFD	CLT	DOV	TEX	MCH	MLW	KAN	KEN	MEM	IRP	NSH	BRI	RCH	NHA; 36	LVS	MAR	ATL	TEX			72nd	131	
2005	Green Light Racing	07	Ford																								PHO; 29	HOM	72nd	131	
