= Homero Richards =

Mexican racing driver (born 1976)

Homero Richards (born June 8, 1976) is a Mexican race car driver from Mexico City. Richards won back-to-back championships in the Panam GP Series (Latin American Formula Renault championship), in 2004 and 2005. He made his first and only Champ Car World Series start in 2005 at Autódromo Hermanos Rodríguez.

In 2006, Richards switched from open-wheel to stock cars, and started to compete in the NASCAR Corona Series. He drove the No. 20 Nextel car for H&H Racing, a team he co-owns with his brother Horacio. In 2014, he switched from Nextel to AXTEL M Racing team. He now races for Escudería Grupo TOP in the NASCAR PEAK Mexico Series.

== Complete Champ Car Results ==
(key)

Year	Team	No.	1	2	3	4	5	6	7	8	9	10	11	12	13	Rank	Points	Ref
2005	CTE-HVM Racing	50	LBH	MTY	MIL	POR	CLE	TOR	EDM	SJO	DEN	MTL	LVS	SRF	MXC; 16	28th	5	
