= Óvalo Aguascalientes México =

Racing track in Aguascalientes, Mexico

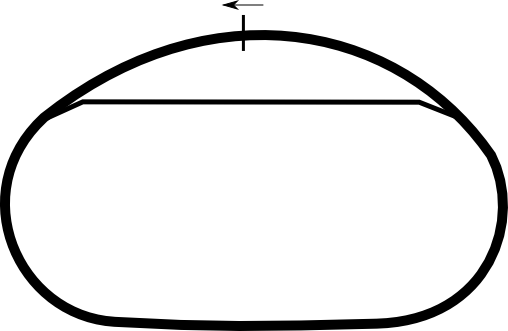
- Oval (2009–present)
- Location: Aguascalientes
- Coordinates: 21°43′23″N 102°19′39″W
- Capacity: 35,000
- Opened: 2009
- Major events: Current: NASCAR Mexico Series (2009–2015, 2017–present); Former: NACAM F4 (2016, 2018–2019); Fórmula Panam (2015–2016); LATAM Challenge Series (2012–2013)
- Website: http://www.oam.mx/

Oval (2009–present)
- Surface: Concrete
- Length: 1.408 km (0.875 mi)
- Turns: 3
- Banking: 16°
- Race lap record: 0:23.544 ( Rubén García Jr., Toyota Camry NASCAR, 2018, NASCAR Mexico)

Roval (2011–present)
- Surface: Concrete
- Length: 1.800 km (1.118 mi)
- Turns: 9
- Banking: 16°
- Race lap record: 0:54.260 ( (Venezuela) José López, Tatuus FR2000 VW, 2013, F-Vee)

The Ovalo Aguascalientes México is a car racing track in Aguascalientes, Mexico. The OAM was inaugurated in 2009. OAM has a capacity for 35,000 people.

It is the fastest oval in Mexico. The qualifying lap record was set in May 2013 by Rubén Garcia Jr. with a lap time of 0:23.596 seconds, at an average speed of 133.497 mph (214.843 km/h). The oval has been venue for NASCAR Mexico Series events since 2009.

== Layout ==
The length of this track is 0.875 mi (1.408 km) with a banking of 16°. In 2011 was inaugurated a road course of 1.800 km (1.118 mi).

== Lap records ==
As of November 2018, the fastest official race lap records at the Óvalo Aguascalientes México are listed as:

Category	Time	Driver	Vehicle	Event
Oval (2009–present): 1.408 km (0.875 mi)
Stock car racing	0:23.544	Rubén García Jr.	Toyota Camry NASCAR	2018 Gran Premio BLU Smartphones
Roval (2011–present): 1.800 km (1.118 mi)
Formula Vee	0:54.260	José López	Tatuus FR2000 Volkswagen	2013 Aguascalientes LATAM Challenge round
Formula Abarth	0:54.768	Giancarlo Vecchi	Tatuus FA010	2016 Aguascalientes Fórmula Panam round
Formula 4	0:56.169	Axel Matus	Mygale M14-F4	2016 Aguascalientes NACAM F4 round
Stock car racing	0:58.013	Abraham Calderón	Toyota Camry NASCAR	2018 Gran Premio Baoli
