= Arteaga (surname) =

Arteaga is a Basque surname. Notable people with this surname include:

- Alfred Arteaga (1950–2008), Chicano poet, writer, and scholar.
- David Arteaga (born 1981), Spanish footballer
- Eldis Cobo Arteaga (1929–1991), Cuban chess player
- Gerardo Arteaga (born 1998), Mexican footballer
- Humberto Arteaga (born 1994), Venezuelan baseball player
- Ignacio de Arteaga, Spanish explorer
- J. D. Arteaga (born 1974), American college baseball coach
- Jorge Arteaga (racing driver) (born 1986), Mexican racing driver and entrepreneur
- Jorge Arteaga (footballer, born 1966), Peruvian football defender
- Jorge Arteaga (footballer, born 1998), Peruvian football goalkeeper
- José Luis Pérez de Arteaga (1950–2017), Spanish announcer, critic, journalist and musicologist
- José María Arteaga (1827–1865), Mexican politician and general
- Luis Arteaga García (1871–1938), Chilean politician, minister of foreign affairs in 1938
- Manuel Arteaga (born 1994), Venezuelan footballer
- Manuel Arteaga y Betancourt (1879–1963), Cuban cardinal
- Mario Arteaga (born 1970), Mexican footballer
- Nohely Arteaga (born 1963), Venezuelan actress
- Otto Napoleón Guibovich Arteaga, Peruvian general born 1953
- Rosa Elena Jiménez Arteaga, Mexican politician
- Rosalía Arteaga (born 1956), Ecuadorean politician
- Stefano Arteaga (1747–1799), Spanish-born writer on theatre and music, active in Italy
- Víctor Arteaga (born 1992), Spanish basketball player

== See also ==
- Arteaga (footballer, born 1969), real name Moisés García Fernández, Spanish footballer
