= Jorge Arteaga =

Jorge Arteaga may refer to:

- Jorge Arteaga (racing driver) (born 1986), Mexican racing driver and entrepreneur
- Jorge Arteaga (footballer, born 1966), Peruvian football defender
- Jorge Arteaga (footballer, born 1998), Peruvian football goalkeeper
