= José Luis Pérez =

José Luis Pérez may refer to:

- José Luis Arasti Pérez (born 1971), Navarrese politician
- José Luis Friaza Pérez (born 2002), Spanish professional footballer
- José Luis Pérez Caminero (born 1967), Spanish former professional footballer
- José Luis Pérez (equestrian) (born 1943), Mexican equestrian
- José Luis Pérez (wrestler) (1925–1963), Mexican wrestler

== See also ==
- José Luis Pérez de Arteaga (1950–2017), Spanish announcer, critic, journalist, and musicologist
- José Luis Pérez-Payá (1928–2022), Spanish footballer
