= General Commander of the Peruvian Army =

- Comandante General del Ejército del Perú
- Incumbent; Walter Horacio Córdova Alemán since 4 November 2021
- Peruvian Army
- Member of: Joint Command
- Reports to: Chief of the Joint Command
- Formation: 12 March 1953
- First holder: Manuel Morla Concha

List of Commanders-in-Chief of the Peruvian Army since the creation of that post on March 12, 1953.

- General Manuel Morla Concha 1953–1954
- General Antonio Luna Ferreccio 1954
- General Félix Huamán Izquierdo 1957–1958
- General Víctor Tenorio Hurtado 1958
- General Alfredo Rodríguez Martínez 1958–1960
- General Alejandro Cuadra Rabines 1960
- General Nicolás Lindley López 1960–1962
- General Julio Humberto Luna Ferreccio 1962–1963
- General Rodolfo Belaúnde Ramírez 1963–1964
- General José del Carmen Cabrejo Mejía 1964–1965
- General Pablo Jhery Camino 1965
- General Julio Doig Sánchez 1965–1967
- General Juan Velasco Alvarado 1967–1968
- General Ernesto Montagne Sánchez 1968–1973
- General Edgardo Mercado Jarrín 1973–1975
- General Francisco Morales Bermúdez 1975
- General Oscar Vargas Prieto 1975–1976
- General Jorge Fernández Maldonado 1976
- General Guillermo Arbulú Galliani 1976–1978
- General Oscar Molina Pallochia 1978–1979
- General Pedro Richter Prada 1979–1980
- General Rafael Hoyos Rubio 1981
- General Otto Elespuru Revoredo 1981
- General Francisco Miranda Vargas 1982
- General Carlos Briceño Zevallos 1983
- General Julián Juliá Freyre 1984
- General Francisco Maury Lopez 1984
- General Germán Ruíz Figueroa 1985
- General Guillermo Monzón Arrunátegui 1986
- General Enrique López Albújar 1987
- General Artemio Palomino Toledo 1987–1989
- General Jorge Zegarra Delgado 1990–1991
- General Pedro Villanueva Valdivia 1991
- General Nicolás de Bari Hermoza Ríos 1991–1998
- General César Saucedo Sánchez 1998–1999
- General José Villanueva Ruesta 1999–2000
- General Walter Chacón Málaga 2000
- General Carlos Tafur Ganoza 2000–2001
- General José Cacho Vargas 2001
- General Víctor Bustamante Reátegui 2002
- General Roberto Chiabra León 2003
- General José Graham Ayllón 2004
- General Luis Alberto Muñoz Díaz 2005
- General César Reinoso Díaz 2006
- General Edwin Donayre 2007–2008
- General Otto Guibovich 2008–2010
- Paul Da Silva Gamarra
- Víctor Ripalda Ganoza
- Ricardo Moncada Novoa
- Ronald Emilio Hurtado Jiménez
- Enrique Vergara Ciapciak
- Luis Humberto Ramos Hume
- César Astudillo Salcedo
- Jorge Celiz Kuong
- Manuel Gómez de la Torre Araníbar
- Pedro Castillo
- José Alberto Vizcarra Álvarez
- Walter Horacio Córdova Alemán
