= Arteaga =

Arteaga may refer to:

- Arteaga, Coahuila, city in Mexico
- Arteaga Municipality, Michoacán, city in Mexico
- Arteaga (surname)
- Arteaga (footballer, born 1969), Spanish footballer

== See also ==
- Gautegiz Arteaga, town in Biscay province of Spain
