= César Astudillo =

Peruvian military personnel

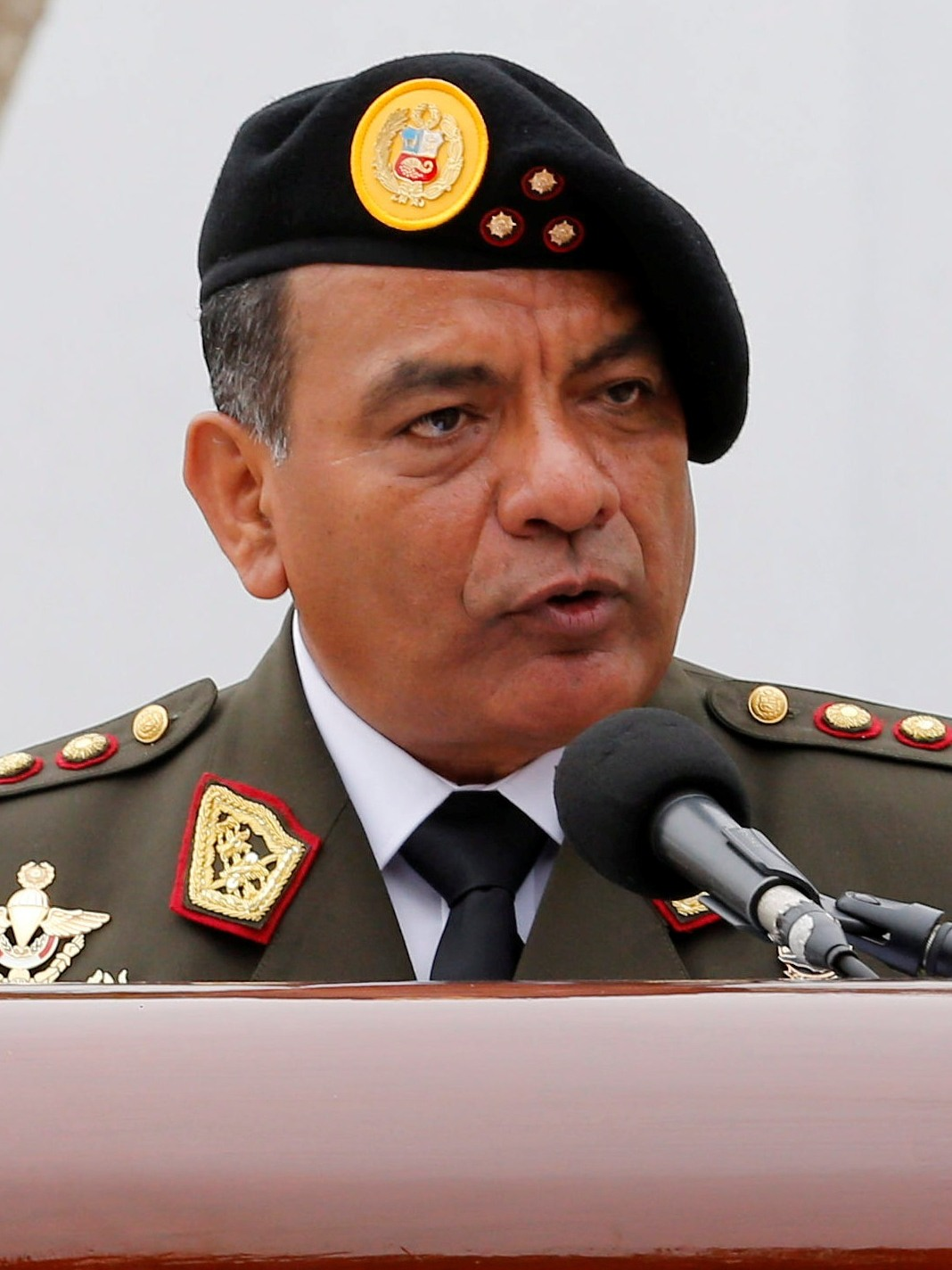
- Astudillo in 2016

Minister of the Interior
- Incumbent
- Assumed office 28 July 2026
- President: Keiko Fujimori
- Prime Minister: Luis Galarreta
- Preceded by: José Zapata Morante

Senator of the Republic
- Incumbent
- Assumed office 26 July 2026
- Constituency: Nationwide

Chief of the Joint Command
- In office 30 October 2018 – 28 July 2021
- President: Martín Vizcarra; Manuel Merino; Francisco Sagasti
- Preceded by: José Paredes Lora
- Succeeded by: Manuel Gómez de la Torre

General Commander of the Peruvian Army
- In office 25 December 2017 – 30 October 2018
- President: Pedro Pablo Kuczynski; Martín Vizcarra
- Preceded by: Luis Humberto Ramos Hume
- Succeeded by: Jorge Céliz Kuong

Personal details
- Born: César Augusto Astudillo Salcedo; 30 September 1960 (age 66) Lima, Peru
- Party: Popular Force
- Spouse: Nancy Fernández
- Children: 2
- Education: Chorrillos Military School

Military service
- Allegiance: Peru
- Branch/service: Peruvian Army
- Years of service: 1983–2021
- Rank: General (General de Ejercito)
- Commands: Chief of the Joint Command; General Commander of the Peruvian Army; Inspector General of the Peruvian Army; General Commander of CE-VRAEM; 3rd Special Forces Brigade
- Battles/wars: Cenepa War; Operation Chavín de Huántar; Operation Cerco

General César Augusto Astudillo Salcedo (born 30 September 1960) is a Peruvian politician and former general who serves as the Minister of the Interior since 2026. Previously, he served as Chief of the Joint Command of the Peruvian Armed Forces from 2018 to 2021 and the General Commander of the Peruvian Army from 2017 to 2018. He is implicated in a corruption case.

== Early life and education ==
He was born in Lima, Peru, on September 30, 1960, and entered the Chorrillos Military School in February 1979, before graduating in the "Héroes de la Breña" class of 1983. He graduated as a Systems Engineer, and holds a Master's degree in Administration and in Military Sciences. He also attended the Advanced Business Management Program (PADE) at the ESAN Business School and the Senior Management Program at the University of Piura. He also took courses locally and abroad such as the Weapons Course in Fort Gulick, Panama and the Resource Management Course and the Advanced Informatics Course at Fort Benning, Georgia in the United States. He is trained in Parachuting, Jumping Master, Free Fall, Regular Command Course and Armored Courses. He also graduated from the LVI Course on Command and General Staff at the United States Army War College, and the Higher Course in Psychological Operations and in the CAEN as a participant in the Defense and National Development Course.

== Military career ==
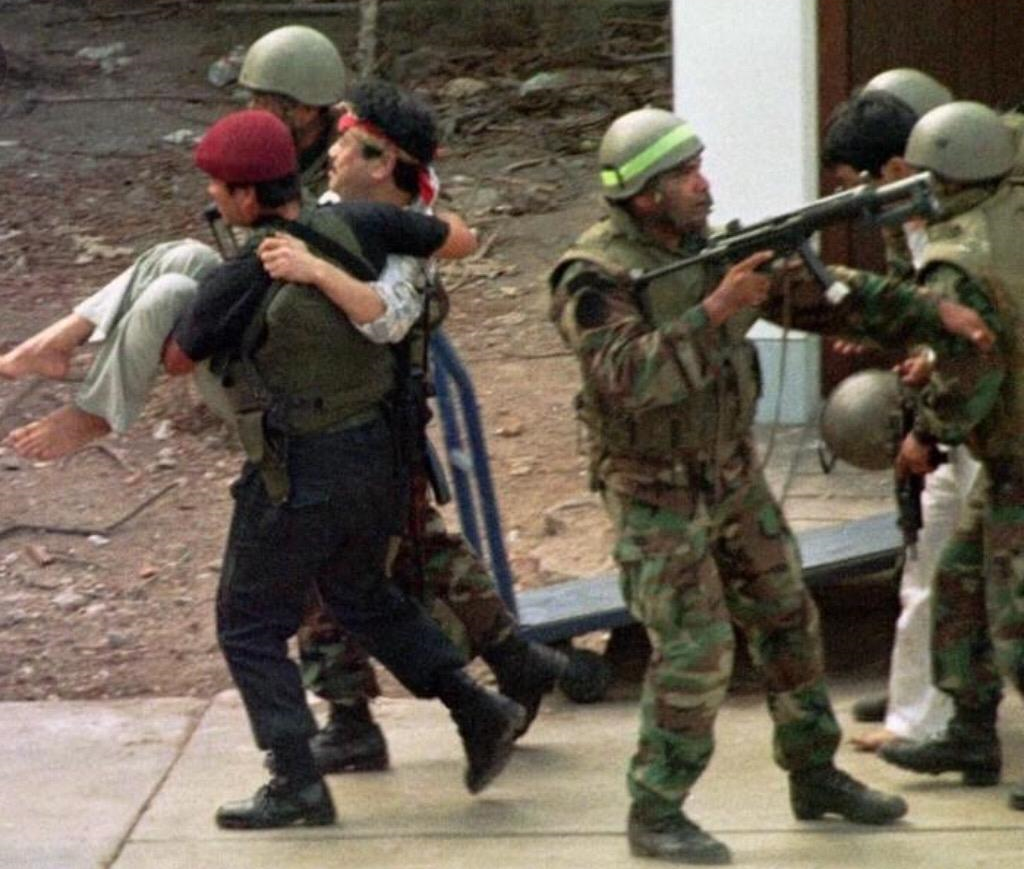
Major César Astudillo Salcedo together with Team Alpha-1 in the rescue of hostages from the residence of the Japanese Ambassador to Peru

He graduated as an infantry officer in 1983, and was assigned to command various army units, particularly in infantry and special forces units. In 1995, he was involved in the Cenepa War, serving the Commando Battalion No. 19., and also led the Capture of Miguel Rincón from the MRTA, and in 1997, he, then a Major, was appointed to integrate the Intervention Force to rescue the 72 hostages that were held captive. On April 22, the date on which the “Chavín de Huántar” Rescue Operation was carried out, and joined the “ALFA” rescue patrol, whose mission was to rescue hostages on the 1st floor of the residence. Given his specialty in Command and training in rescue operations. On April 22, the date on which the “Chavín de Huántar” Rescue Operation was carried out, he joined the “ALFA” rescue patrol, whose mission was to rescue hostages on the 1st floor of the residence of the Japanese Ambassador to Peru.

He was also involved in Operation "Cerco", by leading the capturing Óscar Ramírez Durand (Feliciano) in 1999, and in Operation "Peru", where he led the capture of DT Florindo Eleuterio Flores Hala (Artemio), in 2012, as commander of the 3rd Special Forces Brigade.

In 2014, he was appointed the Chief of the Joint Chiefs of Staff of the VRAEM Special Command, and in June of the same year, he was appointed General Commander of CE-VRAEM. In 2015, he was appointed as the Inspector General of the Army until in December 2017 he was appointed as General Commander of the Peruvian Army, before being appointed as the Chief of the Joint Command of the Peruvian Armed Forces on October 30, 2018. During his term as Chief of the Joint Command, he led various operations in terrorism and military enforcement during the COVID-19 pandemic.

== Awards in military service ==
- Mariscal Cáceres-Distinguido
- Mariscal Cáceres-Honor
- "Cross of Courage" medal
- Decoration of the Joint Command in the Grade of Grand Cross
- Francisco Bolognesi Military Order for Operations in the Huallaga.
- Military Order Francisco Bolognesi in the degree of GRAN CRUZ
- Peruvian Cross Medal for Military Merit in the GRAN CRUZ degree
- Order Peruvian Cross to the Naval Merit - Grade of Grand CROIX- Distantivo White
- Captain Quiñones order in the Grade of Grand Cross
- Medal of General Merit FAP Armando Revoredo Iglesias ”in the“ Gran Cruz ”Class
- Military Merit award to Colonel Eduardo Abaroa, the Armed Forces of the State of Bolivia in the Grade of Grand Cross
- Academic Medal of the Army in the degree of Merit
- Medal to the Combatant Mariscal Cáceres in the degree of Honor
- Diploma and Medal to the winners of Cenepa
- Naval Medal of Honor to the Merit by the Navy - Merit value
- Medal to the Defender of Democracy. CROSS
- National Pacification Belt - HONOR - 2015
- Diploma to the Defender of the Fatherland - Winners of Alto Cenepa
- Diploma of the Council of the Medal of Honor of the Congress of the Republic of Peru

=== Distinctions ===
- Argentine Medal for Academic Excellence
- COINDE plaque of honor for having obtained the first place in the Systems Engineering career
- Distinction of the Republic of Bolivia from the Military Institute of Engineers
- Chilean Army Award
- Distinction of the General Staff of the Army of the Federative Republic of Brazil
- Decoration of the San Martiniano Institute of Peru
- Diploma and Medal of Honor for Merit from the Peruvian Journalists Association -2018
- Diploma from the San Martín University in the San Martín region at the service of the Community
