= Roberto Guerrero =

Colombian-American racing driver (born 1958)

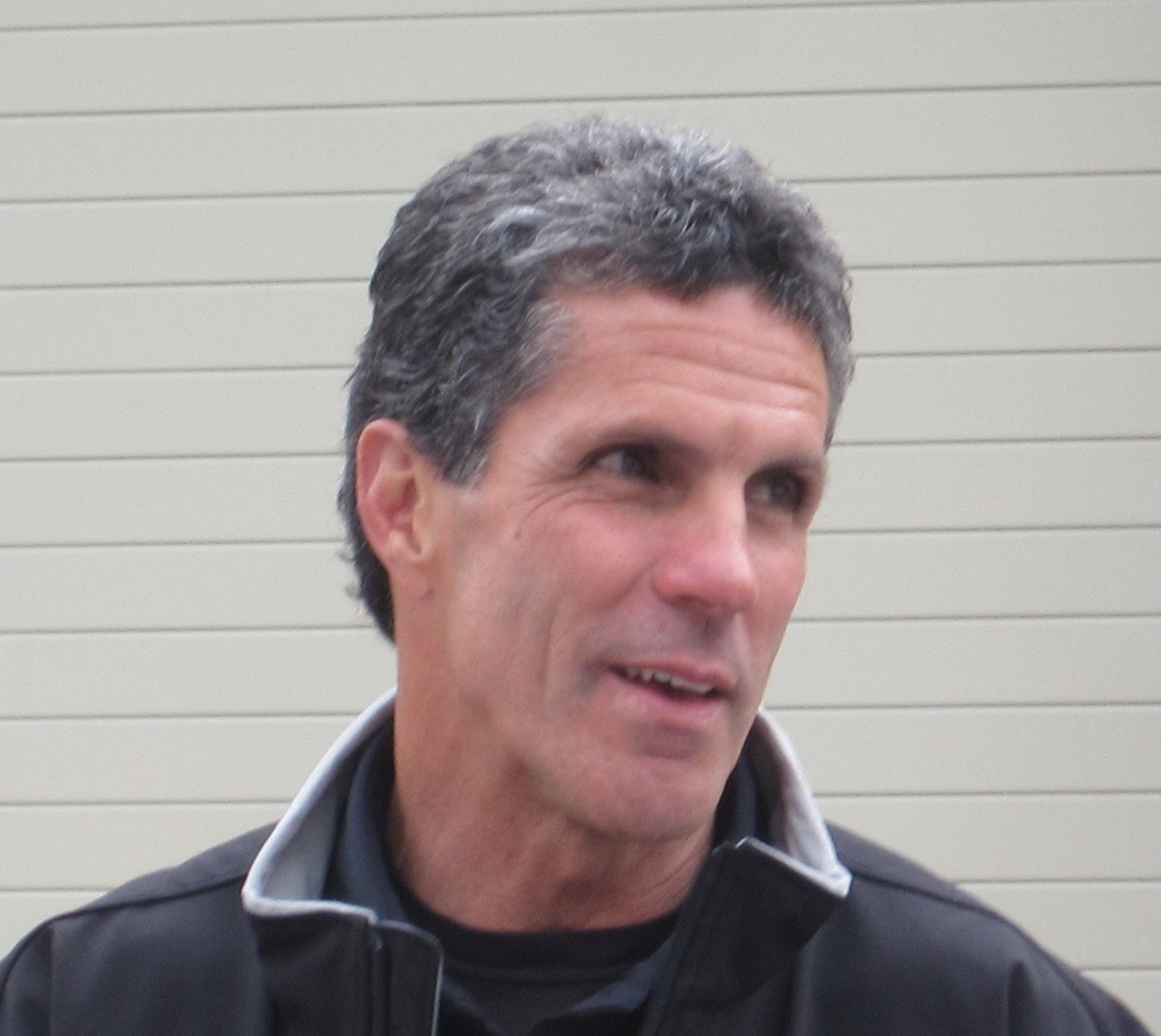
- Guerrero at the Indianapolis Motor Speedway in May 2010
- Nationality: (Colombia) Colombian
- Born: Roberto José Guerrero Isaza; 16 November 1958 (age 67) Medellín, Colombia

Formula One World Championship career
- Active years: 1982–1983
- Team(s): Ensign, Theodore
- Entries: 29 (21 starts)
- Championships: 0
- Wins: 0
- Podiums: 0
- Career points: 0
- Pole positions: 0
- Fastest laps: 0
- First entry: 1982 South African Grand Prix
- Last entry: 1983 European Grand Prix

Champ Car career
- 118 races run over 12 years
- Years active: 1984–1995
- Teams: Bignotti-Carter Racing (1984); Team Cotter (1985-1986); Vince Granatelli Racing (1987-1988); Morales Motorsports (1989); Patrick Racing (1990-1991); King Racing (1991-1993); Euromotorsport (1991); Pagan Racing (1994-1995)
- Best finish: 4th - 1987
- First race: 1984 Toyota Grand Prix of Long Beach (Long Beach)
- Last race: 1995 Indianapolis 500 (Indianapolis)
- First win: 1987 Checker 200 (Phoenix)
- Last win: 1987 Escort Radar Warning 200 (Mid-Ohio)
Wins	Podiums	Poles
2	10	5

Indy Racing League
- Years active: 1996–2001
- Teams: Pagan Racing (1996-1998); Cobb Racing (1998-1999); A. J. Foyt Enterprises (2000); Team Coulson (2000); Dick Simon Racing (2001)
- Starts: 25
- Wins: 0
- Poles: 0
- Best finish: 4th in 1996

Awards
- 1984 1984 1998: Indianapolis 500 Co-Rookie of the Year; CART Jim Trueman Rookie of the Year; Scott Brayton Driver's Trophy

Roberto José Guerrero Isaza (born 16 November 1958) is a Colombian-American former race driver. He participated in 29 Formula One Grands Prix, debuting on 23 January 1982, becoming the first Colombian to start a Formula One Grand Prix.

With no championship points in Formula One and no prospects to drive for a competitive team, Guerrero left at the end of the 1983 season to race in the United States. He had an auspicious beginning to his Indycar racing career, winning both CART and Indianapolis 500 rookie of the year honors in 1984. His initial promise was never completely fulfilled, winning only two CART races, both in 1987. Later the same year he had a massive accident which left him in a coma for 17 days.

Of special note were Guerrero's participations in the Indianapolis 500. He came very close to winning outright on two occasions, but bad luck always kept the victory out of his grasp. In 1992 he spun off on the pace lap after having qualified on the pole position. Guerrero finished runner up twice, in the top-five five times, and held the qualifying speed record from 1992 through 1996. Guerrero was also selected to participate in the 1988 International Race of Champions.

Guerrero became a naturalized citizen of the United States in 1989. He and his wife have three children and reside in San Juan Capistrano in Orange County, California.

In recent years, Guerrero has returned to racing, but of a different venue. He began off-road racing at the legendary Baja 2000. He has since continued to race in Baja 1000 events and guide tours of the Baja Peninsula with Wide Open Baja.

== Early racing ==
=== Karting ===
Guerrero began his racing career in 1972 by competing in kart racing. From 1972 to 1977, he won two national championships in his native Colombia. He also finished third in the 1975 Pan American Karting Championship.

=== Jim Russell Driving School ===
Guerrero then joined the Jim Russell Racing School in 1977. In the school's six events, Guerrero managed to win five of the races and finished second in the other race.

== Open wheel racing ==
=== Formula car racing ===
==== British Formula Ford 1600 ====
Guerrero began competing in British Formula Ford 1600 in 1978. He took eight wins during the season.

==== Formula Three ====
===== British Formula 3 =====
Guerrero competed in Vandervell British Formula 3 for Angila Cars in an Argo JM3-Toyota. He finished ninth in the standings with fifteen points.

Guerrero returned to the series in 1980 with Argo Racing Cars in an Argo JM6-Toyota. During the season he scored five victories at Thruxton Circuit (twice), Cadwell Park, Brands Hatch and Oulton Park. He tied for second in the standings with Kenneth Acheson, each with 95 points.

===== European Formula Three =====
While competing in British Formula 3 Guerrero competed in European Formula Three. He again drove for Angila Cars in an Argo JM3-Toyota. At the end of the season he scored two points to finish in 25th place in the championship.

==== European Formula Two ====
In 1981, Guerrero began competing in European Formula Two for Maurer Motorsport in a Maurer MM81-BMW. He won the Jochen Rindt Memorial Trophy at the Thruxton Circuit. His next best finishes were a pair of fourth place finishes at the Gran Premio del Mediterraneo at Enna-Pergusa and the Gran Premio dell'Adriatico at the Misano Circuit and he finished seventh in the championship with 16 points.

==== Formula One ====
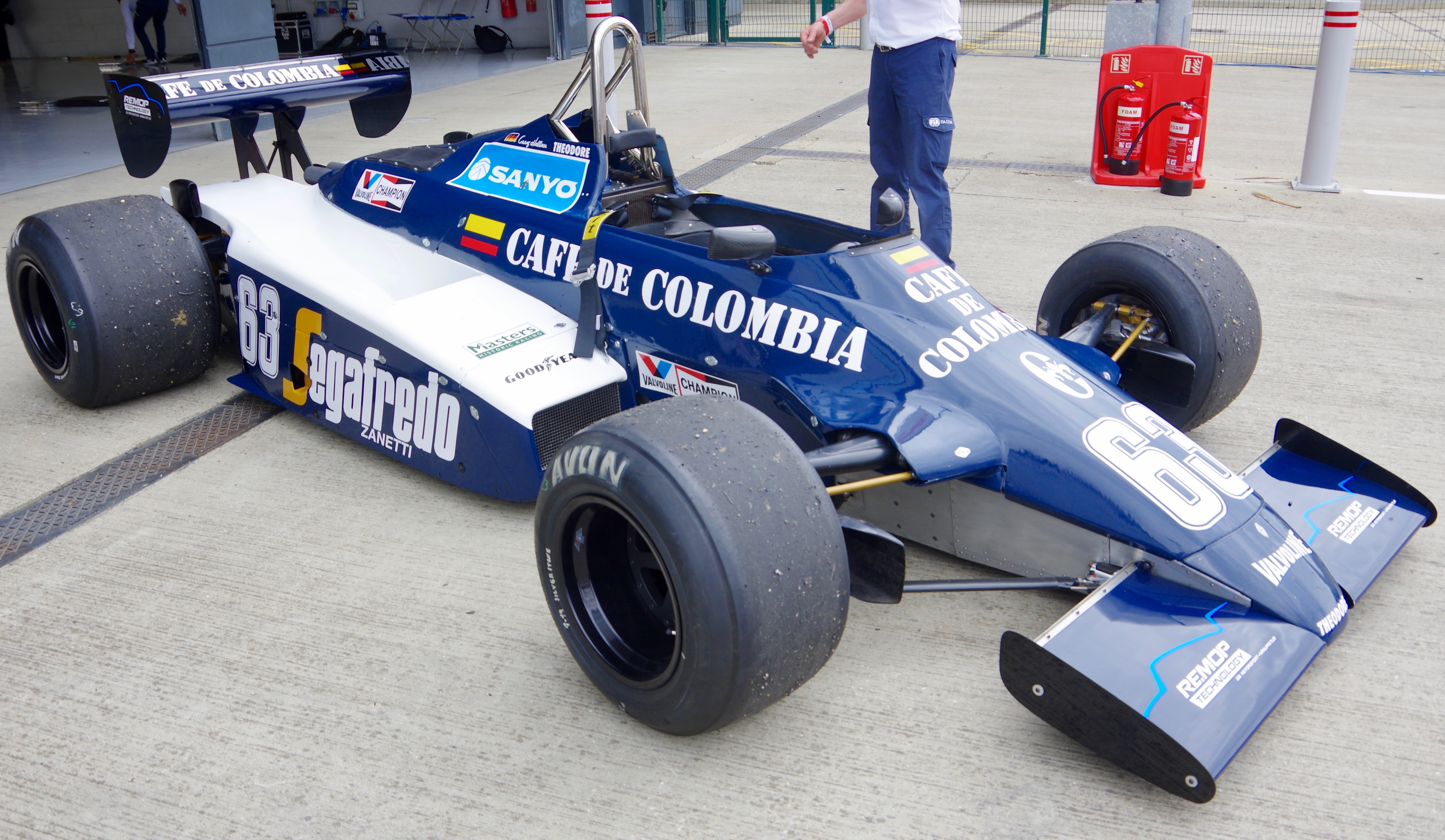
Roberto Guerrero's Theodore N183.

Guerrero began competing in Formula One in 1982 for Ensign Racing, beginning the season in a No. 14 Café de Colombia/Moda Caribu Ensign N180B-Ford Cosworth DFV at the season-opening South African Grand Prix. He failed to qualify for the event due to Guerrero's Formula Two team Maurer Motorsport and its boss Willy Maurer filing an injunction to Ensign team boss Morris Nunn and as a result Guerrero was withdrawn from the race. An official press report from Nunn stated that Guerrero was "in an inappropriate physical and mental condition to drive." Guerrero returned for the following race, the Brazilian Grand Prix, in a new Ensign N181. He again failed to qualify for the race. Guerrero qualified for the third race of the season, the United States Grand Prix West, starting nineteenth and finished fifteenth after crashing 27 laps into the race. Ensign skipped the San Marino Grand Prix due to the FISA–FOCA war and Guerrero then failed to qualify for the Belgian Grand Prix. At the Monaco Grand Prix, Ensign's tire supplier Avon withdrew from Formula One and that left the team tireless. The team got some older tires to use for the race, but Guerrero failed to qualify. Michelin started supplying tires to the team after Monaco and Guerrero qualified for Michelin's first race for the team, the Detroit Grand Prix, starting in a respectable eleventh place. In the race, Guerrero was involved in a crash six laps into the race and was credited with a nineteenth place finish. After that, Guerrero then only failed to qualify at the Dutch Grand Prix and the French Grand Prix. Guerrero scored his best finish of 1982 (and his entire Formula One career) at the German Grand Prix with an 8th-place finish. At the season-ending Caesars Palace Grand Prix, Guerrero qualified in 15th place. The car's engine then blew in the warm up and Guerrero missed the race. Guerrero was unranked in the championship standings due to the fact that he had scored no points.

In 1983, Ensign Racing merged with Theodore Racing and as a result Guerrero began driving the No. 33 Café de Colombia Theodore N183-Ford Cosworth DFV. Guerrero only failed to qualify at the Monaco Grand Prix and became more consistent in finishing races. Despite this Guerrero's best finishes were a pair of twelfth place finishes at the Dutch Grand Prix and the European Grand Prix. At the end of the season, Guerrero again failed to score points and was as a result unranked in the championship while rookie teammate Johnny Cecotto managed to get a sixth place finish and with it one point towards the championship for himself and Theodore (although Cecotto failed to qualify four times to Guerrero's single time).

=== CART Indycar World Series ===
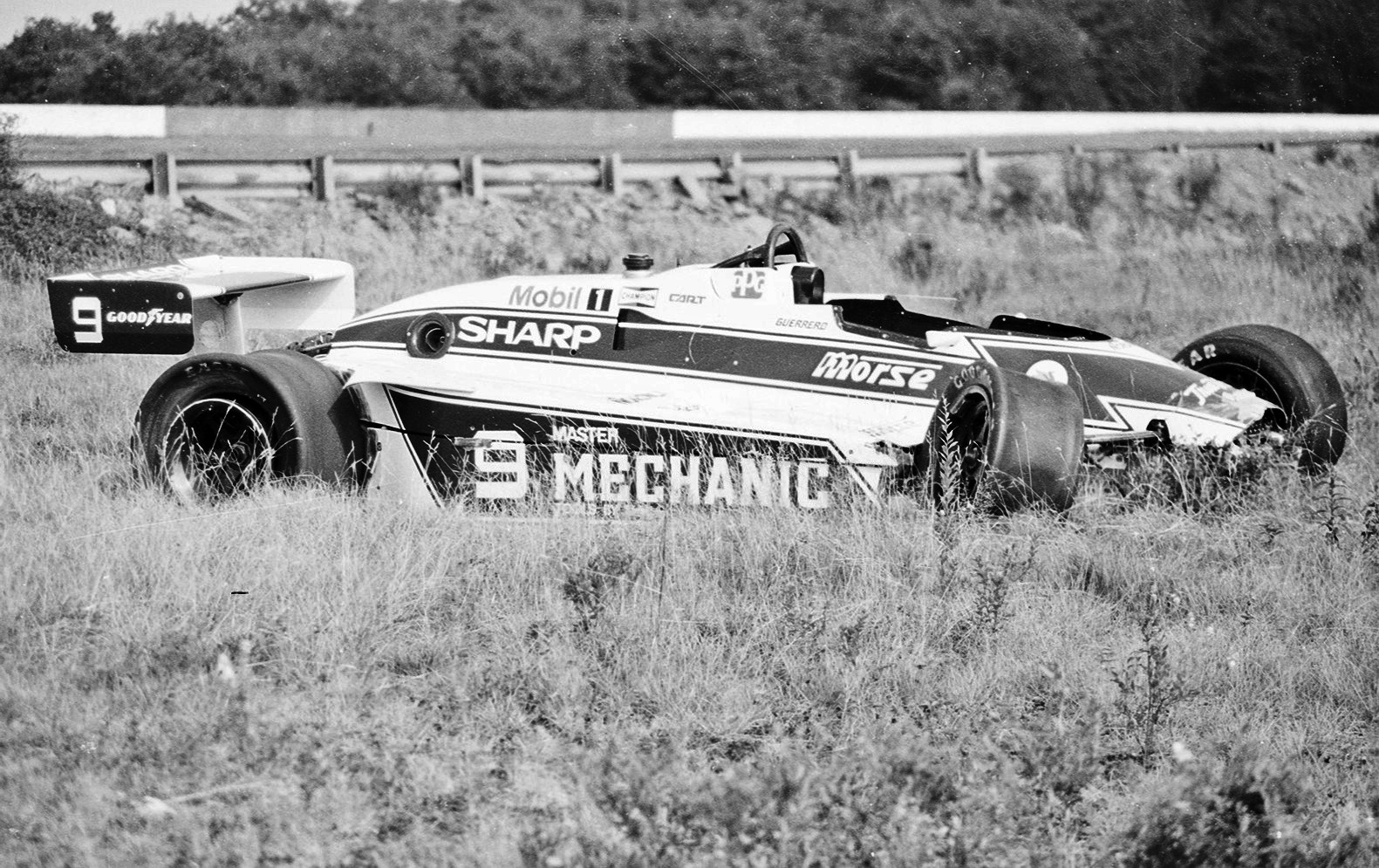
Guerrero's wrecked car at the 1984 Domino's Pizza 500 at Pocono International Raceway.

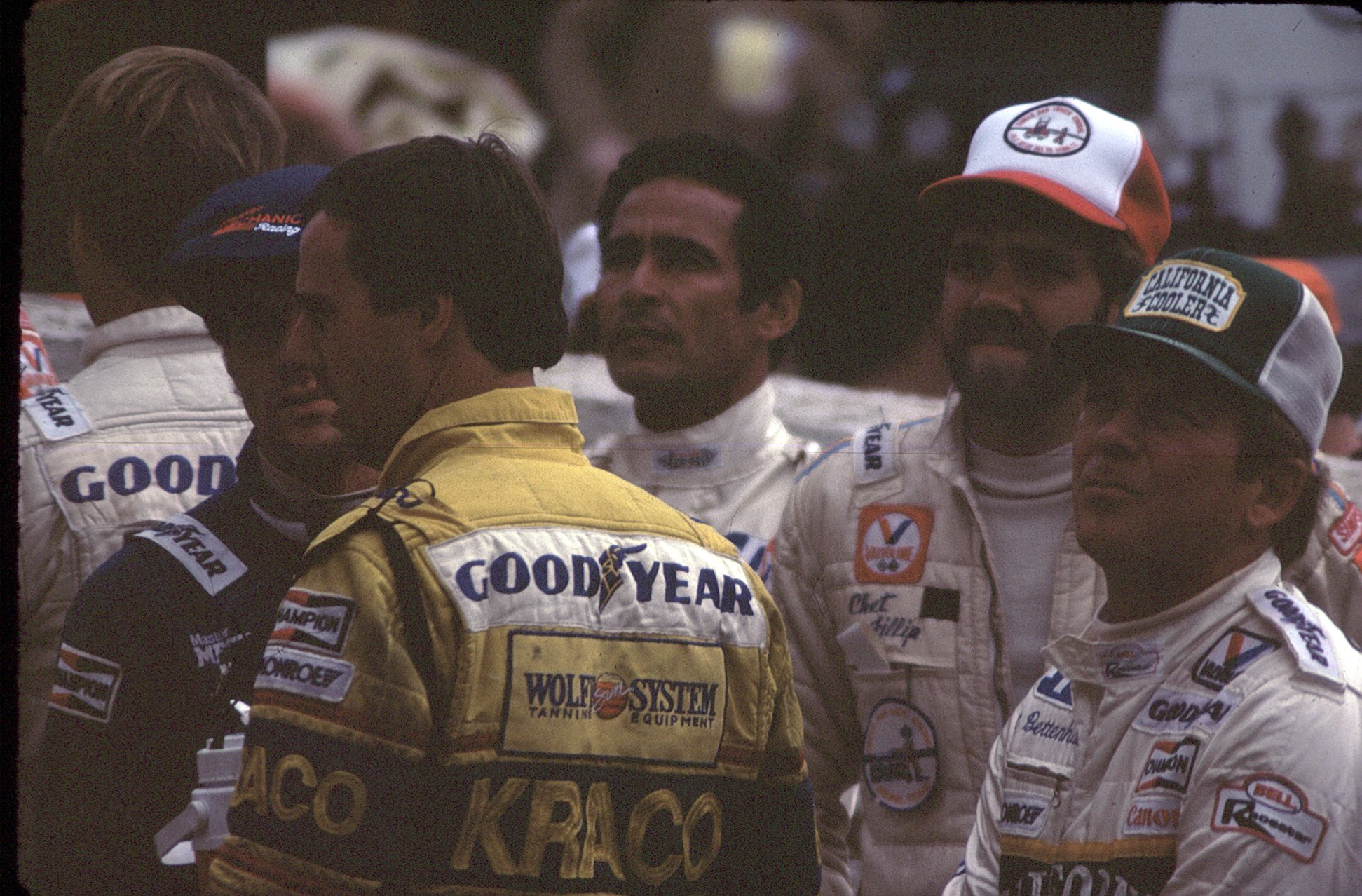
Guerrero (left) with (left to right) Geoff Brabham, Danny Ongais, Chet Fillip and Gary Bettenhausen at the 1984 Domino's Pizza 500 at Pocono International Raceway.

Guerrero made his Indy car debut in 1984 for Bignotti-Cotter Racing in the No. 9 Master Mechanic March 84C-Cosworth DFX with legendary chief mechanic George Bignotti serving as Guerrero's chief mechanic. The high point of Guerrero's season was a second place finish at the Indianapolis 500 where he also shared the race's rookie of the year award with Michael Andretti. Guerrero's best finishes outside of Indianapolis were a pair of fifth place finishes at the Budweiser Cleveland Grand Prix at Burke Lakefront Airport and the Michigan 500 at Michigan International Speedway. Guerrero finished out the season eleventh in points with 52 points, only one point out of the top ten. Guerrero won the series' rookie of the year award.

In 1985, Bignotti retired, and the team was reorganized as Team Cotter with Guerrero driving their No. 9 Master Mechanic/True Value March 85C-Cosworth DFX. Compared to the previous season, 1985 was a disappointment highlighted by a third-place finish at the Indianapolis 500 and a fourth at the Stroh's 300K at Laguna Seca Raceway. The season also saw Guerrero retire out of a race twice while leading, first at the Michigan 500 at Michigan International Speedway (due to gearbox issues) and then at the Molson Indy 300 at Sanair Super Speedway (due to Guerrero crashing). Guerrero finished the season seventeenth in points with 34 points.

Guerrero returned with Team Cotter in 1986 to drive their No. 2 True Value/Emerson Electronics March 86C-Cosworth DFX (numbered 5 at Indianapolis only). Guerrero continued his streak of impressive finishes with a fourth place in the race. Guerrero also scored a pair of second place finishes, first at the Escort Radar Warning 200 at Mid-Ohio Sports Car Course and the Miami Indy Challenge 200 at Tamiami Park. In the latter, Guerrero qualified on pole position and led every lap, except the final lap due to running out of fuel and handing the win to Al Unser Jr.. Guerrero finished the season ninth in points with 87 points.

In 1987, Cotter sold the team to Vince Granatelli (son of former Indy car owner Andy Granatelli) to form Vince Granatelli Racing with Guerrero driving the No. 4 True Value/STP March 87C-Cosworth DFX. Guerrero scored his first Indy car win at the Checker 200 at Phoenix International Raceway. In the race, Guerrero originally qualified third, but the car was declared illegal, and Guerrero started 22nd (last) to charge his way up through the field to win. At the Indianapolis 500, Guerrero and Granatelli were one of the few teams to have no issues with March 87C as several teams decided to use year-old 86C models instead. In the race, Guerrero qualified fifth and was viewed as among the favorites, along with pole sitter Mario Andretti and defending winner Bobby Rahal. In the race, Rahal retired after 57 laps due to ignition problems, and Guerrero was in second place behind Andretti for much of the race. On the 130th lap, a wheel came off of Tony Bettenhausen's car, and it hit the nose of Guerrero's car and went flying into the grandstand and where it killed spectator Lyle Kurtenbach. On lap 177, Andretti started to have electrical troubles, and Guerrero took the lead. On lap 182, Guerrero came in for his final pit stop, and as he exited his pit stall, the engine stalled. Third gear had been damaged earlier in the race by the Bettenhausen incident, and the car began to get moving, only to stop just outside the pit lane. This caused Al Unser Sr. to take the lead and get a lap on Guerrero. Guerrero finally got going and unlapped himself on lap 191, and there was a caution on lap 192 for Andretti stopping on the track. On lap 196, the restart came out with six cars between Unser and Guerrero. Guerrero was unable to get by Unser and ended up finishing second to one of the year-old March 86Cs to be pressed into race service.

=== Near-fatal crash and recovery ===
After his near-win in Indianapolis, subsequently, Guerrero scored four pole positions at the Miller American 200 in Honor of Rex Mays at the Milwaukee Mile, the Budweiser/G.I. Joe's 200 presented by Texaco at Portland International Raceway, Budweiser Grand Prix of Cleveland at Burke Lakefront Airport, and the Escort Radar Warning 200 at Mid-Ohio Sports Car Course. In the latter Guerrero scored his second (and unbeknownst at the time, last) IndyCar victory. Just days after his Mid-Ohio victory, Guerrero was testing at the Indianapolis Motor Speedway, when he crashed and was hit by a tire off of his car. Guerrero was in a coma for seventeen days and did not compete in any more races in 1987. Guerrero finished a career-best fourth in points with 106 points, despite missing the final three races of the season.

Guerrero's recovery from his near-fatal accident was documented by IndyCar Medical Director, Dr. Steve Olvey, who said in his biography, Rapid Response: My Inside-Story as a Motor-Racing Life-Saver, that he saved Guerrero's life by lowering the pressure in his brain with injections of medicines that were brand-new to the medical field and were not widely practiced yet. Somehow, his treatment worked and Guerrero's recovery, which only took less than three months, led to him studying traumatic brain injuries as his primary focus of study.

=== Later career ===
In 1988, Guerrero returned with Vince Granatelli Racing and originally drove the No. 2 STP/Dianetics: The Evolution of a Science Lola T88/00-Cosworth DFX. At the season-opening Checker 200 at Phoenix International Raceway Guerrero qualified and finished in second place. However, the remainder of the season was mostly a disappointment, such as the Indianapolis 500 where Guerrero qualified twelfth and did not even make it through the first lap due to being collected by Scott Brayton. The team even attempted to use a year-old March 87C at select races to no avail. Guerrero's only top tens after Indianapolis were the Quaker State 500 at Pocono International Raceway in the Lola and the Bosch Spark Plugs Grand Prix at Nazareth Speedway in the March. After starting tenth at Long Beach Guerrero's best start was at Nazareth, where he started eleventh. At the end of the season Guerrero finished twelfth in points with 40 points, despite skipping two races.

Following the 1988 season, Guerrero and Granatelli split for 1989. Guerrero joined Alex Morales Motorsports, who was at the time the factory (and only) team using Alfa Romeo engines. Guerrero drove the No. 21 Alfa Romeo March 89CE-Alfa Romeo Indy V8. The engine ended up being not ready for the start of the season and the team missed the first four races of the year, including the Indianapolis 500. Guerrero was even offered the chance to drive an extra car for Truesports. Guerrero had to decline due to his contract with Alfa Romeo. The team managed to first compete at the Valvoline Detroit Grand Prix on the Streets of Detroit. In the race Guerrero was able to finish eighth. The remainder of the season saw Guerrero score only one additional point due to a twelfth place finish at the Red Roof Inns 200 at Mid-Ohio Sports Car Course. Guerrero would finish 23rd in points with 6 points.

Prior to 1990, Morales Motorsports closed down and Patrick Racing took over the Alfa Romeo project with Guerrero driving the No. 20 Miller Genuine Draft March 90CA-Alfa Romeo Indy V8. Guerrero managed to qualify for the Indianapolis 500, starting 28th and finishing 23rd due to suspension damage. The team then switched to using a Lola T90/00 starting at the Marlboro 500 at Michigan International Speedway. In the race, Guerrero finished in fifth place. At the end of the season Guerrero finished sixteenth in the points with 24 points.

In 1991, Guerrero was replaced by Danny Sullivan and was left without a car to drive. At the Indianapolis 500 Guerrero drove a second car for Patrick Racing in the No. 40 Sharp's Lola T91/00-Alfa Romeo Indy V8. He qualified 28th and finished thirtieth after being involved in a crash with Kevin Cogan on Guerrero's 24th lap. Guerrero then drove three select races for King Racing in the No. 26 Quaker State Lola T91/00-Buick V6, scoring a best finish of fourteenth at the Valvoline Detroit Grand Prix on the Streets of Detroit and the Texaco/Havoline Grand Prix of Denver at the Pepsi Center. Guerrero finally drove the No. 50 Fendi/Hawaiian Tropic Lola T91/00-Cosworth DFS at the Molson Indy Toronto at Exhibition Place, qualifying and finishing in 18th place. Guerrero scored no points for the first time in his CART career and finished 37th in the championship.

For 1992, Guerrero drove in a pair of races for the part-time team King Racing, first driving the No. 26 Quaker State Lola T91/00-Buick V6 at the Toyota Grand Prix of Long Beach on the Streets of Long Beach, starting fourteenth and finishing thirteenth. At the Indianapolis 500 King updated Guerrero to a Lola T92/00-Buick V6 and the number was changed to 36 (Jim Crawford began to drive the No. 26 car). During qualifying Guerrero set a new four-lap track record of 232.482 mph and a new one-lap record of 232.618 mph on the third lap. Guerrero qualified on pole position and became the first part-time driver to qualify on the pole since Pancho Carter in 1985. In the race Guerrero spun out and crashed on the backstretch during the second parade lap and did not even get to start the race, being credited with 33rd (last) place. Guerrero joined Cliff Woodbury in 1929 and Carter in 1985 as drivers who started first in the Indianapolis 500 and finished last; they were later joined by Greg Ray in 2000 and Scott Sharp in 2001. Guerrero finished 38th in the championship with one point.

In 1993, King Racing expanded to a full-time schedule with Guerrero driving their No. 40 Budweiser Lola T93/00-Ilmor-Chevrolet Indy V8 265C. At the Indianapolis 500 Guerrero qualified tenth and finished 28th after being involved in a crash with Jeff Andretti after 125 laps. During the year Guerrero and King consistently qualified in the mid-pack, with a best start of fourth at the Valvoline 200 at Phoenix International Raceway. Guerrero's best finish was also a fourth at the New England 200 at New Hampshire Motor Speedway. Following the Molson Indy Vancouver at Concord Pacific Place King released Guerrero. Guerrero finished fourteenth in the championship with 39 points (he was thirteenth in the championship at the time of his release).

In 1994, Guerrero could only get a car to drive at the Indianapolis 500 with Pagan Racing (the same team who owned the car that Jeff Andretti crashed into Guerrero the previous year) in their No. 21 Interstate Batteries Lola T92/00-Buick V6. The chassis was the same chassis that Guerrero drove in 1992. Guerrero qualified 20th and finished 33rd (last) due to a crash after twenty laps. He scored no points and tied for 54th in the championship.

In 1995, Guerrero returned with Pagan Racing in their No. 21 Upper Deck Reynard 94i-Ilmor-Mercedes-Benz IC108B. Guerrero first raced at the Slick 50 200 at Phoenix International Raceway, starting 25th and finishing sixteenth. The team then competed in the Indianapolis 500, where Guerrero qualified in a respectable thirteenth place and finished in twelfth place. Guerrero finished the season 33rd in the championship with one point.

==== Indy Racing League ====
In 1996, Guerrero and Pagan Racing began competing full-time in the newly formed Indy Racing League with Guerrero driving the No. 21 WavePhore Reynard 94i-Ford Cosworth XB, with additional sponsorship coming from Johnny Lightning (at Disney), Newscast (at Phoenix) and Pennzoil (at Indianapolis). At the season-opening Indy 200 at Walt Disney World at Walt Disney World Speedway Guerrero qualified second and finished fifth. At the Dura Lube 200 at Phoenix International Raceway Guerrero qualified third and finished sixteenth due to a broken cv joint. At the Indianapolis 500 the team updated to a Reynard 95i and Guerrero qualified 6th and led for a race-high 47 laps and battled for the win with Tony Stewart, Arie Luyendyk, Davy Jones, Alessandro Zampedri and eventual winner Buddy Lazier. On Guerrero's final pit stop on lap 167 he and Lazier came into the pits. While in the pits the nozzle was connected awkwardly and fuel began to spill out. The car then began to catch fire and Guerrero began to climb out of the car when it was determined to be okay to continue racing. Guerrero fell out of contention and went a lap down. On the final lap of the race, as Lazier and Jones crossed the finish line, Guerrero lost control of his car in the fourth turn and took out fourth place Zampedri (who was on the lead lap) and sixth place Eliseo Salazar (who was two laps down) and caused Zampedri to get airborne and flip. Guerrero came to a rest inside the pit lane, just past the entrance. Guerrero finished fourth in the championship with 237 points.

During the 1996 portion of the 1996-1997 season, Guerrero continued to drive for Pagan Racing in the No. 21 Pennzoil Reynard 95i-Ford Cosworth XB. At the season-opening True Value 200 at New Hampshire Motor Speedway Guerrero started eighteenth and finished sixth. Guerrero then drove a Reynard 94i at the Las Vegas 500K at Las Vegas Motor Speedway to start ninth and finish a season-best fourth. Starting at the Indy 200 at Walt Disney World Speedway the series began to use a different type of spec car with Guerrero driving the No. 21 Pennzoil Dallara IR7-Nissan Infiniti Q45 for Pagan Racing. The Infiniti engine was usually slower than the competing Oldsmobile engine and Guerrero's best race with the engine was the Phoenix 200 at Phoenix International Raceway, where he started tenth and finished seventh. At the Indianapolis 500 Guerrero qualified in nineteenth place and finished 27th after retiring due to a suspension failure after 25 laps with Guerrero running as high as eleventh place. Starting with the Samsonite 200 at Pikes Peak International Raceway the team switched to the Oldsmobile Aurora Indy V8. Guerrero's best finish with the Oldsmobile engine came at the Pennzoil 200 at New Hampshire Motor Speedway with a sixth place finish. At the season-ending Las Vegas 500K at Las Vegas Motor Speedway, Guerrero suffered a major accident on lap 201 on the backstretch. Guerrero flipped coming off of the second turn and flipped into the grass area next to the racetrack. He climbed out of his destroyed car just moments after the accident finished. Guerrero finished the season ranked seventh in points with 221 points.

In 1998, Pagan Racing was left without a sponsor when the team's chief mechanic, John Barnes, formed his own team called Panther Racing using Pagan's former Pennzoil sponsorship. Guerrero drove the No. 21 Pagan Racing Dallara IR8-Oldsmobile Aurora Indy V8. At the season-opening Indy 200 at Walt Disney World Speedway Guerrero qualified 6th and finished 26th after retiring due to a crash after thirteen laps. At the Indianapolis 500 Guerrero won the Scott Brayton Award for best showing the spirit of the deceased driver. In the race Guerrero started ninth and finished 22nd, 75 laps down. Following the True Value 500 at Texas Motor Speedway Pagan released Guerrero. Guerrero then joined Cobb Racing to drive the No. 23 CBR G-Force IR01-Nissan Infiniti Q45. Guerrero finished fourth at the Lone Star 500 at Texas Motor Speedway. Guerrero finished 26th in the championship with 83 points.

In 1999, Guerrero returned with Cobb Racing in the No. 50 Cobb Racing G-Force IR01-Nissan Infiniti Q45. Guerrero's best finish of the season was a thirteenth place finish at the season-opening Transworld Diversified Services 200 at Walt Disney World Speedway. The team closed down following the Indianapolis 500 where Guerrero started and finished 25th. After Indianapolis Guerrero was ranked seventeenth in points. He eventually finished thirtieth in the championship with 36 points.

For 2000, Guerrero managed to get a one-off race for A. J. Foyt Enterprises in the No. 41 Harrah's Dallara IR00-Oldsmobile Aurora Indy V8. Guerrero was unable to qualify for the race, making it the first time since 1989 that he failed to start the Indianapolis 500. Guerrero later competed in the Belterra Resort Indy 300 at Kentucky Speedway for Team Coulson in the No. 40 Team Coulson G-Force GF01-Oldsmobile Aurora Indy V8. In the race Guerrero started 25th and finished 23rd after retiring after 48 laps due to engine troubles in what would be his final Indy car race. Guerrero finished the season 44th in the championship with seven points.

In 2001, Guerrero had no team at the beginning of practice for the Indianapolis 500. Dick Simon Racing then needed a driver for their No. 7 Yellow Transportation Dallara IR01-Oldsmobile Aurora Indy V8 after Stéphan Grégoire left the team. Guerrero eventually managed to qualify the car. On the final day of qualifying Grégoire began driving for Heritage Motorsports and bumped Guerrero from the field and Guerrero failed to qualify for the second consecutive year.

Guerrero was reported to be searching for a car to drive in the 2002 Indianapolis 500, although nothing materialized. He eventually retired from racing by 2003.

== Stock car racing ==
=== International Race of Champions ===
In 1988, Guerrero was among the drivers chosen to compete in IROC XII (International Race of Champions) to be among the drivers to represent CART/PPG World Series (other drivers to represent CART were Al Unser Jr., Al Unser Sr. and Bobby Rahal) based on his performance in 1987. Guerrero drove an identical Chevrolet Camaro, like all other participants. He missed the season-opening race at Daytona International Speedway due to his injuries received the previous year at an Indianapolis Motor Speedway test. Guerrero qualified on the pole position for the second and third races of the season at Riverside International Raceway and Michigan International Speedway. At Riverside, Guerrero crashed after ten laps and finished in eleventh place and at Michigan he finished tenth after leading for four laps. At the season-ending race at Watkins Glen International, Guerrero started twelfth and finished eleventh, ten laps down. At the end of the season, Guerrero finished twelfth (last) in the championship with nineteen points, earning $30,400 for his efforts during the season.

=== NASCAR ===
Guerrero attempted to compete in the NASCAR Busch Series during the 2000 season at the Carquest Auto Parts 300 at Lowe's Motor Speedway for the Hispanic Racing Team in their No. 72 HRT Motorsports Chevrolet Monte Carlo but failed to qualify for the event. He returned during the 2002 season after his Indy car career was finished, again with the Hispanic Racing Team in their No. 09 Ciclon Energy Drink Chevrolet Monte Carlo at the Aaron's 312 at Atlanta Motor Speedway but again failed to qualify for the race.

== Announcing ==
Guerrero served as a TV live race commentator for SpeedTV and FOX 3 Latin America broadcasts of the American Le Mans Series and the Grand-Am Rolex Sports Car Series from 2009 to 2013.

== Racing record ==
=== Complete European Formula Two Championship results ===
(key) (Races in bold indicate pole position; races in italics indicate fastest lap)

Year	Entrant	Chassis	Engine	1	2	3	4	5	6	7	8	9	10	11	12	Pos	Pts
1981	Maurer Motorsport	Maurer MM81	BMW	SIL; Ret	HOC; 10	THR; 1	NÜR; Ret	VLL; Ret	MUG; 6	PAU; Ret	PER; 4	SPA; Ret	DON; Ret	MIS; 4	MAN; Ret	7th	16

=== Complete Formula One World Championship results ===
(key)

Year	Entrant	Chassis	Engine	1	2	3	4	5	6	7	8	9	10	11	12	13	14	15	16	WDC	Points
1982	Ensign Racing	Ensign N180B	Ford Cosworth DFV 3.0 V8	RSA; WD																NC	0
1982	Ensign Racing	Ensign N181	Ford Cosworth DFV 3.0 V8		BRA; DNQ	USW; Ret	SMR	BEL; DNQ	MON; DNQ	DET; Ret	CAN; Ret	NED; DNQ	GBR; Ret	FRA; DNQ	GER; 8	AUT; Ret	SUI; Ret	ITA; NC	CPL; DNS	NC	0
1983	Theodore Racing Team	Theodore N183	Ford Cosworth DFV 3.0 V8	BRA; NC	USW; Ret	FRA; Ret	SMR; Ret	MON; DNPQ	BEL; Ret	DET; NC	CAN; Ret	GBR; 16	GER; Ret	AUT; Ret	NED; 12	ITA; 13	EUR; 12	RSA		NC	0

=== American Open Wheel racing results ===
(key) (Races in bold indicate pole position)

==== USAC ====
(key) (Races in bold indicate pole position)

Year	1	2	Rank	Points
1983–84	DUQ	INDY; 2	2nd	800

==== CART Indycar World Series ====
Year	Team	No.	Chassis	Engine	1	2	3	4	5	6	7	8	9	10	11	12	13	14	15	16	17	Rank	Points
1984	Bignotti-Cotter Racing	9	March 84C	Cosworth DFX	LBH; 26	PHX1; 24	INDY; 2	MIL; 21	POR; 19	MEA; 25	CLE; 5	MIS1; 5	ROA; 11	POC; 31	MOH; 15	SAN; 25	MIS2; 23	PHX2; 24	LS; 7	LVG; 6		11th	52
1985	Team Cotter	9	March 85C	Cosworth DFX	LBH; 26	INDY; 3	MIL; 6	POR; 15	MEA; DNS	CLE; 19	MIS1; 13	ROA; 19	POC; 18	MOH; 18	SAN; 23	MIS2; 24	LS; 4	PHX; 21	MIA; 28			17th	34
1986	Team Cotter	2	March 86C	Cosworth DFX	PHX1; 8	LBH; DNS	INDY; 4	MIL; 18	POR; 13	MEA; 4	CLE; 17	TOR; 20	MIS1; 24	POC; 21	MOH; 2	SAN; 17	MIS2; 22	ROA; 4	LS; 5	PHX; 12	**MIA**; 2	9th	87
1987	Vince Granatelli Racing	4	March 87C	Cosworth DFX	LBH; 12	PHX; 1	INDY; 2	**MIL**; 16	**POR**; 19	MEA; 19	**CLE**; 5	TOR; 4	MIS; 14	POC; 3	ROA; 7	**MOH**; 1	NAZ; Inj	LS; Inj	MIA; Inj			4th	106
1988	Vince Granatelli Racing	4	Lola T88/00	Cosworth DFX	PHX; 2	LBH; 19	INDY; 32	MIL; DNS		CLE; 20	TOR	MEA	MIS; 20	POC; 3	MOH; 11				MIA; 26			12th	40
1988	Vince Granatelli Racing	4	March 87C	Cosworth DFX					POR; 14							ROA; 22	NAZ; 6	LS; 14				12th	40
1989	Alex Morales Motorsports	21	March 89CE	Alfa Romeo Indy V8	PHX	LBH	INDY	MIL	DET; 8	POR; 23	CLE; 13	MEA; 22	TOR; 28	MIS; 22	POC; 16	MOH; 12	ROA; 21		LS; 25			23rd	6
1989	Alex Morales Motorsports	21	March 88C	Alfa Romeo Indy V8														NAZ; 20				23rd	6
1990	Patrick Racing	20	March 90CA	Alfa Romeo Indy V8	PHX; 16	LBH; 14	INDY; 23	MIL; 18	DET; 21	POR; 8	CLE; 19	MEA; 15	TOR									16th	24
1990	Patrick Racing	20	Lola T90/00	Alfa Romeo Indy V8										MIS; 5	DEN; 17	VAN; 24	MOH; 26	ROA; 8	NAZ; 9	LS; 18		16th	24
1991	Patrick Racing	40	Lola T91/00	Alfa Romeo Indy V8	SRF	LBH	PHX	INDY; 30	MIL													38th	0
1991	King Racing	26	Lola T91/00	Buick V6 (t/c)						DET; 15	POR	CLE	MEA			DEN; 19	VAN	MOH	ROA	NAZ	LS; 18	38th	0
1991	Euromotorsport	50	Lola T91/00	Cosworth DFS										TOR; 18	MIS							38th	0
1992	King Racing	26	Lola T91/00	Buick V6 (t/c)	SRF	PHX	LBH; 13															38th	1
1992	King Racing	36	Lola T92/00	Buick V6 (t/c)				**INDY**; 33	DET	POR	MIL	NHA	TOR	MIS	CLE	ROA	VAN	MOH	NAZ	LS		38th	1
1993	King Racing	40	Lola T93/00	Ilmor-Chevrolet Indy V8 265C	SRF; 19	PHX; 15	LBH; 5	INDY; 28	MIL; 7	DET; 26	POR; 24	CLE; 29	TOR; 10	MIS; 7	NHA; 4	ROA; 23	VAN; 11	MOH	NAZ	LS		14th	39
1994	Pagan Racing	21	Lola T92/00	Buick V6 (t/c)	SRF	PHX	LBH	INDY; 33	MIL	DET	POR	CLE	TOR	MIS	MOH	NHA	VAN	ROA	NAZ	LS		54th	0
1995	Pagan Racing	21	Reynard 94i	Ilmor-Mercedes-Benz IC108B	MIA	SRF	PHX; 16	LBH	NAZ	INDY; 12	MIL	DET	POR	ROA	TOR	CLE	MIS	MOH	NHA	VAN	LS	33rd	1

==== Indy Racing League ====
Year	Team	No.	Chassis	Engine	1	2	3	4	5	6	7	8	9	10	11	12	13	Rank	Points	Ref
1996	Pagan Racing	21	Reynard 94i	Ford Cosworth XB	WDW; 5	PHX; 16												**4th**	**237**	
1996	Pagan Racing	21	Reynard 95i	Ford Cosworth XB			INDY; 5											**4th**	**237**	
1996–97	Pagan Racing	21	Reynard 95i	Ford Cosworth XB	NHM; 6													**7th**	**221**	
1996–97	Pagan Racing	21	Reynard 94i	Ford Cosworth XB		LVS; 4												**7th**	**221**	
1996–97	Pagan Racing	21	Dallara IR7	Nissan Infiniti Q45			WDW; 17	PHX; 7	INDY; 27	TXS; 13								**7th**	**221**	
1996–97	Pagan Racing	21	Dallara IR7	Oldsmobile Aurora Indy V8							PPIR; 18	CLT; 17	NH2; 6	LV2; 14				**7th**	**221**	
1998	Pagan Racing	21	Dallara IR8	Oldsmobile Aurora Indy V8	WDW; 26	PHX; 27	INDY; 22	TXS; 24	NHM	DOV	CLT							**26th**	**83**	
1998	CBR Cobb Racing	23	G-Force GF01	Nissan Infiniti Q45								PPIR; 21	ATL; 19	TX2; 4	LVS; 20			**26th**	**83**	
1999	Cobb Racing	50	G-Force GF01	Nissan Infiniti Q45	WDW; 13	PHX; 16	CLT	INDY; 25	TXS; DNP	PPIR	ATL	DOV	PPI2	LVS	TX2			**30th**	**36**	
2000	A. J. Foyt Enterprises	41	Dallara IR00	Oldsmobile Aurora Indy V8	WDW	PHX	LVS	INDY; DNQ	TXS	PPIR	ATL							**44th**	**7**	
2000	Team Coulson Racing	40	G-Force GF01	Oldsmobile Aurora Indy V8								KTY; 23	TX2					**44th**	**7**	
2001	Dick Simon Racing	07	Dallara IR01	Oldsmobile Aurora Indy V8	PHX	HMS	ATL	INDY; DNQ	TXS	PPIR	RIR	KAN	NSH	KTY	STL	CHI	TX2	NC	-	

==== Indianapolis 500 ====
Year	Chassis	Engine	Start	Finish	Team
1984	March 84C	Cosworth DFX	7	2	Bignotti-Cotter Racing
1985	March 85C	Cosworth DFX	16	3	Team Cotter
1986	March 86C	Cosworth DFX	8	4	Team Cotter
1987	March 87C	Cosworth DFX	5	2	Vince Granatelli Racing
1988	Lola T88/00	Cosworth DFX	12	32	Vince Granatelli Racing
1990	March 90CA	Alfa Romeo Indy V8	28	23	Patrick Racing
1991	Lola T91/00	Alfa Romeo Indy V8	28	30	Patrick Racing
1992	Lola T92/00	Buick V6 (t/c)	**1**	33	King Racing
1993	Lola T93/00	Ilmor-Chevrolet Indy V8 265C	10	28	King Racing
1994	Lola T92/00	Buick V6 (t/c)	30	33	Pagan Racing
1995	Reynard 94I	Ilmor-Mercedes-Benz IC108B	13	12	Pagan Racing
1996	Reynard 95i	Ford Cosworth XB	6	5	Pagan Racing
1997	Dallara IR7	Nissan Infiniti Q45	19	27	Pagan Racing
1998	Dallara IR8	Oldsmobile Aurora Indy V8	9	22	Pagan Racing
1999	G-Force GF01	Nissan Infiniti Q45	25	25	Cobb Racing
2000	Dallara IR00	Oldsmobile Aurora Indy V8	DNQ		A. J. Foyt Enterprises
2001	Dallara IR01	Oldsmobile Aurora Indy V8	DNQ		Dick Simon Racing

=== NASCAR ===
(key) (Bold – Pole position awarded by qualifying time. Italics – Pole position earned by points standings or practice time. * – Most laps led.)

==== Busch Series ====
NASCAR Busch Series results
Year	Team	No.	Make	1	2	3	4	5	6	7	8	9	10	11	12	13	14	15	16	17	18	19	20	21	22	23	24	25	26	27	28	29	30	31	32	33	34	NBSC	Pts	Ref
2000	Hispanic Racing Team	72	Chevy	DAY	CAR	LVS	ATL	DAR	BRI	TEX	NSV	TAL	CAL	RCH	NHA	CLT; DNQ	DOV	SBO	MYB	GLN	MLW	NZH	PPR	GTY	IRP	MCH	BRI	DAR	RCH	DOV	CLT	CAR	MEM	PHO	HOM			NA	-	
2002	Hispanic Racing Team	09	Chevy	DAY	CAR	LVS	DAR	BRI	TEX	NSH	TAL	CAL	RCH	NHA	NZH	CLT	DOV	NSH	KEN	MLW	DAY	CHI	GTY	PPR	IRP	MCH	BRI	DAR	RCH	DOV	KAN	CLT	MEM	ATL; DNQ	CAR	PHO	HOM	NA	-	

=== International Race of Champions ===
(key) (Bold - Pole position. * – Most laps led.)

International Race of Champions results
Year	Make	1	2	3	4	Pos.	Points	Ref
1988	Chevy	DAY	**RSD**; 11	**MCH**; 10	GLN; 11	12th	19	

Sporting positions
Preceded by Teo Fabi	Indianapolis 500; Rookie of the Year; 1984 with: Michael Andretti	Succeeded by Arie Luyendyk
Preceded by Teo Fabi	CART; Rookie of the Year; 1984	Succeeded by Arie Luyendyk
Awards
Preceded by John Paul Jr.	Scott Brayton Award; 1998	Succeeded by Eliseo Salazar
