= Edwin Donayre =

Peruvian general (born 1952)

Edwin Alberto Donayre Gotzch
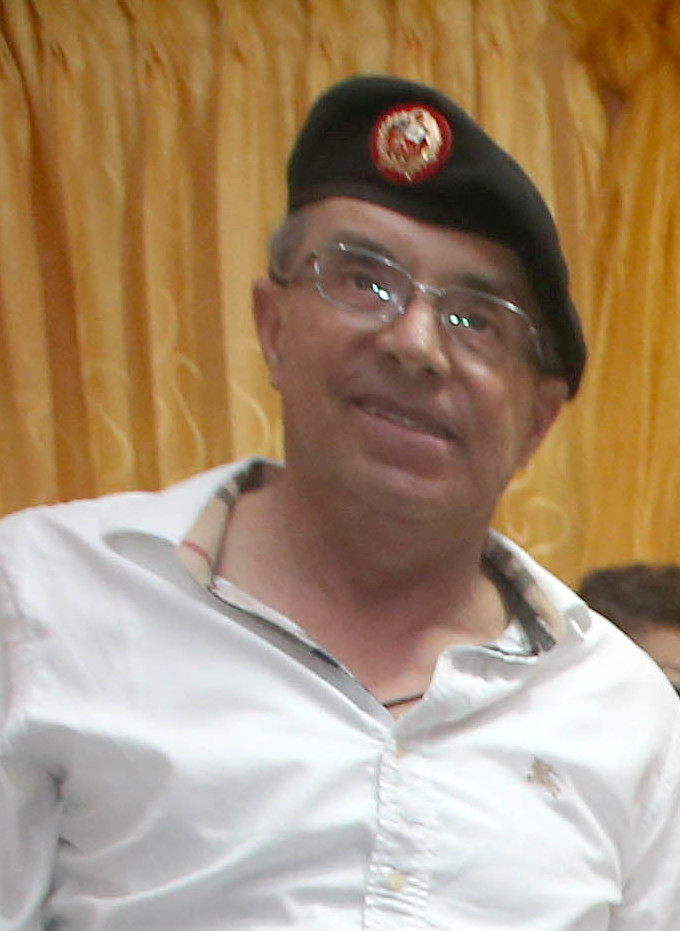

Member of Congress
- In office 26 July 2016 – 3 May 2019
- Succeeded by: Luis Iberico Núñez
- Constituency: Lima

Commanding General of the Peruvian Army
- In office 5 December 2006 – 5 December 2008
- Preceded by: César Reinoso Díaz
- Succeeded by: Otto Guibovich Arteaga

Personal details
- Born: January 8, 1952 (age 74) Ayacucho, Peru
- Party: Alliance for Progress

Military service
- Allegiance: Peru
- Branch/service: Peruvian Army
- Rank: General

General Edwin Donayre (born January 8, 1952) is a Peruvian politician, a former Congressman and a retired military officer who is wanted by the police on corruption charges.

Donayre previously served as Commanding General of the Peruvian Army, commander of the Center Military Region, the Southern Military Region, and the 2nd Infantry Brigade. He assumed the role of commanding general on December 5, 2006, replacing General César Reinoso, who resigned amid accusations of corruption. During his tenure, Donayre was accused of corruption and obstructing inquiries into human rights violations. He was also at the center of an international controversy when a video surfaced in the media showing him making anti-Chilean remarks at a private party. He retired on December 5, 2008, and was replaced by General Otto Guibovich.

== Military career ==
Edwin Donayre was born on January 8, 1952, in the city of Ayacucho in the highlands of Peru. He attended San Juan Bosco school, a Salesian institution in his hometown, and studied at a seminary for two years before studying two years of Chemical Engineering at the San Cristóbal of Huamanga University. Donayre's military career started at the Chorrillos Military School, where his first year grades earned him a scholarship to continue his formation in Argentina. At the National Military College in Buenos Aires he graduated with honors as a military engineer. In active duty Donayre has served four times in regions under state of emergency due to Shining Path guerrilla activity and five times in frontier regions. He has held several command posts, among them commander of the 20th Combat Engineer Battalion, director of the Army Engineer School, commander of the 2nd Infantry Brigade, commander of the Southern Military Region, and commander of the Central Military Region.

== Commanding General ==
Donayre's tenure as Commanding General of the army was controversial from the start due to corruption allegations and an international incident with Chile. Opposition leader Ollanta Humala criticized Donayre's designation as irregular because at that time he was not serving as general of any of the three major army divisions as stipulated by Peruvian law. As commander of the Army, Donayre was also accused of acquiring 50,000 American-made MREs — military rations — to supply troops deployed against Shining Path guerrillas in the Apurímac and Ene river valleys, instead of acquiring cheaper, locally made alternatives. An attempt to buy 50,000 more rations led to an inquiry by the Ministry of Defense.

The general's stance on human rights issues has also been quite controversial. It has been reported that he was behind the Army's refusal to provide any information on the 1984 Putis massacre. Requests issued in June 2008 by prosecutor Rubén López for a detailed report on the military personnel deployed there at that time were answered the following month by the Defense Ministry stating that the Army did not have any information on the subject in its archives. Donayre also joined a campaign to raise funds to defend armed forces personnel accused of committing human rights abuses during the internal conflict in Peru.

== Political career ==
In the 2011 general elections, he presented himself as a candidate to Congress representing the Ayacucho Region. Although he received the highest vote in his region, he was not elected, since his Radical Change party was not able to pass the 5% electoral threshold.

In the 2014 regional elections, he would once again try his hand in Peruvian politics by being a candidate for the Regional Presidency of Ayacucho by the Alliance for Progress Ayacucho party. Donayre ended up with almost 28% of the votes, surpassed only by his opponent, Wilfredo Oscorima, who would obtain 32% of the vote.

In the 2016 general election, Edwin Donayre was elected as Congressman, representing the Ayacucho Region, running as independent within the Alliance for Progress party.

== Controversy ==
=== Corruption charges ===
According to a report by the army inspector general, Francisco Vargas, Donayre requested 80,000 gallons of fuel without clear justification when he was commander of the Southern Military Region, between January and September 2006, and diverted part of it to army headquarters in Lima. This led to an investigation by the anti-corruption prosecutor, Marlene Berrú, but, despite being summoned six times, Donayre did not show up at her office. He finally attended her request on November 25, 2008; in his testimony he denied any wrongdoing and claimed that the Southern Military Region actually received less fuel under his command than in the previous year.

On August 27, 2018, Donayre was found guilty (along with 40 people) of the crime of peculation in the case of fuel trafficking. the second liquidation room of the Court of Justice of Lima sentenced him to five years and six months of effective prison. The court requests the lifting of immunity since he was serving as a Congressman and thus had parliamentary immunity.

On May 2, 2019, with 102 votes in favor, 0 against and 1 abstention, the request to lift Donayre's parliamentary immunity was approved by Congress. The judicial police went in search of the former soldier in his residence located in Santiago de Surco but was not found although his lawyer mentioned to the media that he would hand himself over to justice in the next few hours. He is currently wanted by the Peruvian authorities.

=== International controversy ===
Donayre became the center of an international controversy on November 24, 2008, when Peruvian media showed a YouTube video in which the general said "We are not going to let Chileans pass by (...) [A] Chilean who enters will not leave. Or will leave in a coffin. And if there aren't sufficient coffins, there will be plastic bags". The video, dated to 2006 or 2007, was recorded during a party at a friend's house attended by army officials and civilians. These comments caused widespread indignation in Chile, making headlines in the El Mercurio newspaper. The Peruvian president, Alan García, called his Chilean counterpart, Michelle Bachelet, to explain that these remarks did not reflect official Peruvian policy. Bachelet declared herself satisfied with the explanations.

On November 28, in response to this incident, a Chilean government spokesman stated that a scheduled visit to Chile by the Peruvian defense minister, Ántero Flores Aráoz, might be inopportune given the circumstances. The following day, Flores Aráoz announced his decision to postpone his trip after conferring with the Foreign Affairs Minister, José Antonio García Belaúnde. Several members of the Peruvian government commented on the spokesman's remarks including president García who said the country "did not accept pressure or orders from anybody outside of Peru". Donayre defended the video, declaring that Peruvian citizens have a right to say whatever they want at private gatherings and that even though he is scheduled to retire on December 5 he will not be forced to resign early under external pressure. As a consequence of these exchanges, tensions between Peru and Chile rose again; president Bachelet met with top aides on December 1 to discuss the matter and possible courses of action. Meanwhile, in Lima, Congressman Gustavo Espinoza became the center of attention as the main suspect of leaking the video to Chilean press and politicians. Donayre ended his tenure as Commanding General of the Army on December 5, 2008, as expected; president Alan García appointed General Otto Guibovich as his replacement.

== See also ==
- Peruvian Army

Military offices
| Preceded by General César Reinoso Díaz | Commander-in-Chief of the Peruvian Army; 2007 – 2008 | Succeeded by General Otto Guibovich |
