= Hispanic Racing Team =

Defunct NASCAR Busch Series team

Hispanic Racing Team was a NASCAR Busch Series team owned by Mike Vasquez, Rudy Rodriguez and former Winston Cup owner Larry Hedrick. The cars were driven by 1992 Indy 500 polesitter Roberto Guerrero, Carlos Contreras, Christian Fittipaldi, and former Busch Series champion David Green.
