= Joint Command of the Armed Forces of Peru =

Military unit of Peru

Joint Command of the Armed Forces
- Comando Conjunto de las Fuerzas Armadas
- Seal of the CCFFAA
- Founded: 1957
- Country: Peru
- Allegiance: President of Peru
- Type: Joint Headquarters
- Headquarters: Calle Nicolás Corpancho 289, Santa Beatriz, Lima, Peru
- Website: http://www.ccffaa.mil.pe/

Commanders
- Chief of the Joint Command: General de Ejercito César Briceño Valdivia.

Insignia
- Flag

The Joint Command of the Armed Forces (Spanish: Comando Conjunto de las Fuerzas Armadas; CCFFAA) is the executive agency of the Ministry of Defence of Peru in charge of the Armed Forces. The current President of the Joint Command is General de Ejercito César Briceño Valdivia.

== History ==
In the 1950s, the military institutions studied the experiences of the operational use of the forces during World War II and gave evidence of necessity that the Armed Forces must include a permanent joint organization, in which there would exist a commando unit to be used in the planning of operations, whose execution and use in any armed conflict would require a permanent coordination of the:

- Army of Peru
- Air Force of Peru
- Navy of Peru

The project of the creation of the Joint Command of the Armed Forces, which finally was approved by Supreme Decree Nº 002-GM/1 on February 1, 1957. Major General EP Manuel Cossío Cossío was designated the first president of the CCFFAA. It is stated in articles of the Supreme Decree that “the Joint Command of the Armed Forces, depends directly on the President of the Republic, who has the highest authority in the planning and coordination of the operations of the Forces of the Army, Navy and Air Force”.

== Mission ==
It is the agency in charge of the planning, preparation, coordination, direction and joint military direction of combat operations of the military institutions and the fulfillment of the objectives of the Policy of National defense, assuring its maximum effectiveness in coordination with assigned logistic and budgetary resources, and in observance of the principles of interoperativity, efficiency and to operate jointly.

== Organization ==
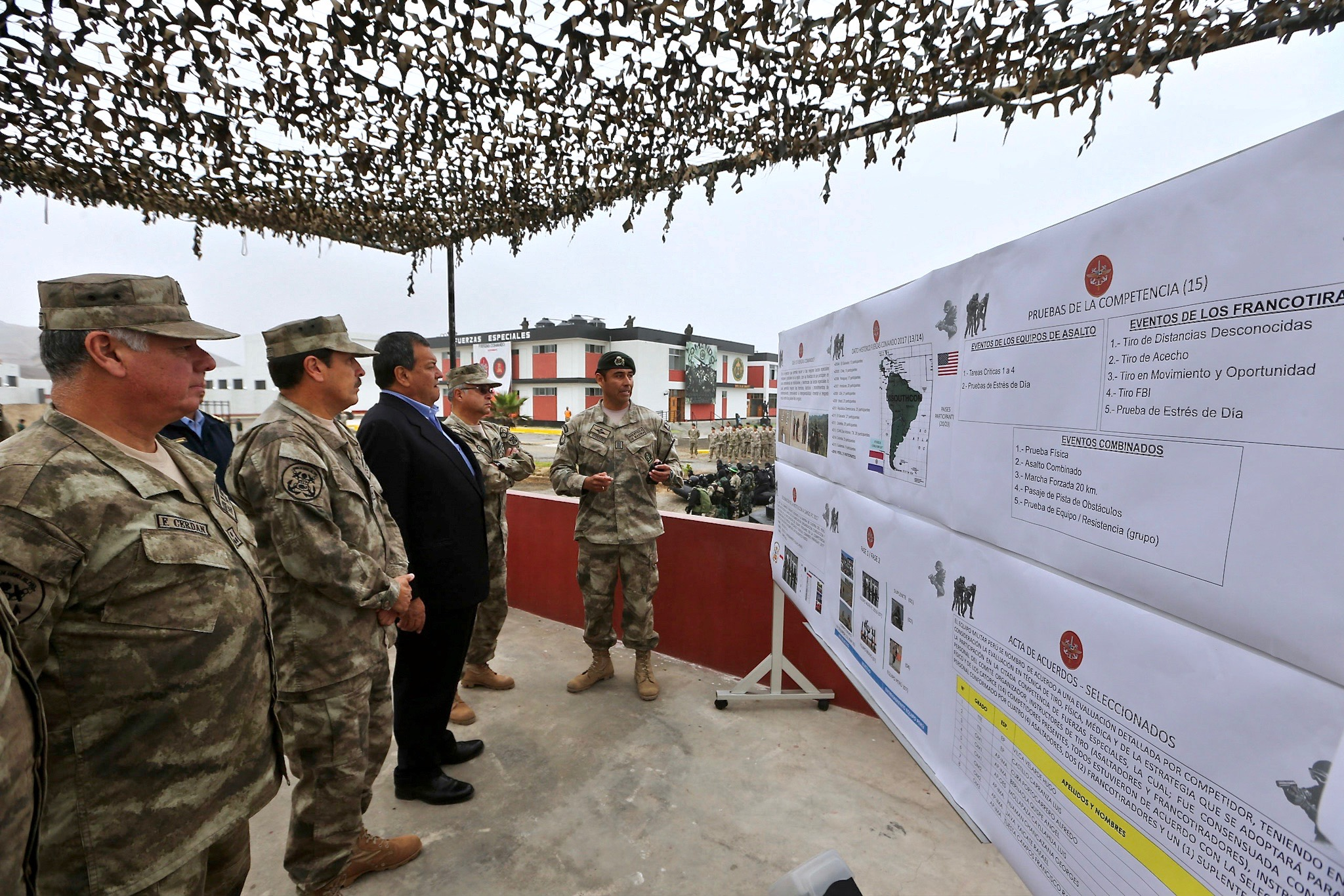
Joint Command discussing SOUTHCOMs 2017 Fuerzas Comando competition to Defense Minister Jorge Nieto Montesinos

The Joint Command of the Armed Forces is organized as follows:

- Head of the Joint Command of the Armed Forces
  - Office of National Affairs
  - Office of International Affairs
  - General Administration Office
  - Office of Plans, Programs, Budget and Rationalization
  - Office of Legal Advice
  - Liaison Office of the Peruvian National Police
  - Institutional Control Body
- Inspector General
- Head of the Joint Chiefs of Staff of the Armed Forces
  - 1st Division of Personnel (1st DIEMCFFAA)
  - 2nd. Division of Intelligence (2nd DIEMCFFAA)
  - 3rd. Operations Division (3rd DIEMCFFAA)
  - 4th Logistics Division (4th DIEMCFFAA)
  - 5th. Division of Plans and Policy (5th DIEMCFFAA)
  - 6th Command and Control Division (6th DIEMCFFAA)
  - 7th Division of Preparation and Evaluation of the Armed Forces (7th DIEMCFFAA)
  - 8th Division of Information Operations (8th DIEMCFFAA)
  - 9th Division of External Front (9th DIEMCFFAA)
