= Jorge Arteaga (racing driver) =

Mexican racing driver and entrepreneur (born 1986)

Jorge Arteaga Plascencia
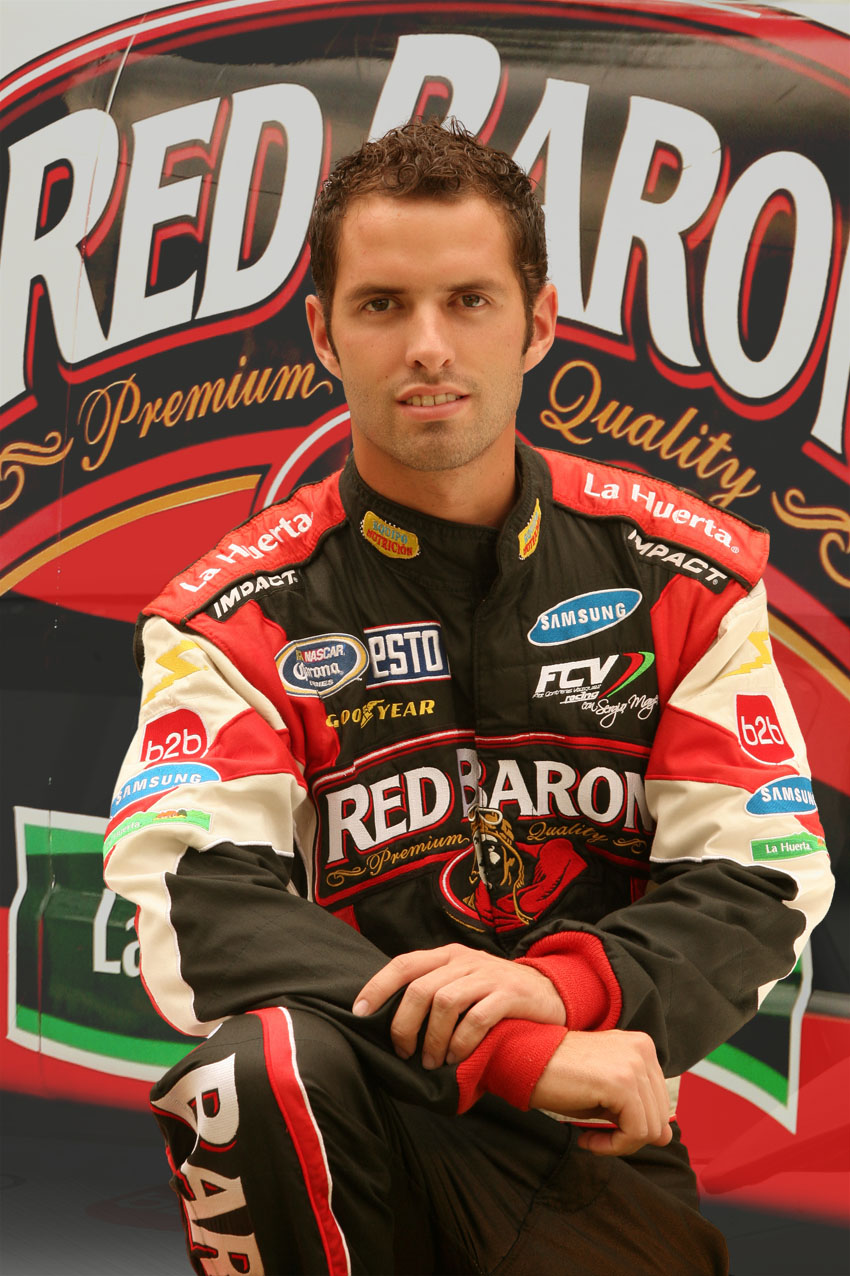
- Arteaga in 2010
- Born: March 28, 1986 (age 40); Aguascalientes, Mexico
- Awards: 2009, 2010, 2011 NASCAR Corona Series Most Popular Driver

NASCAR Mexico Series career
- 49 races run over 4 years
- Best finish: 8th (2010)
- First race: 2008 Querétaro (El Marqués)
- Last race: 2011 Mexico Fest 200 (Mexico City)
Wins	Top tens	Poles
0	12	1
- Statistics up to date as of December 22, 2012.

Jorge Arteaga (born March 28, 1986, in Aguascalientes) is a Mexican racing driver and entrepreneur. He competed in the NASCAR Toyota Series. He won the Most Popular Driver award for the Mexican Series three straight times, from 2009 to 2011. He also drove the No. 8 Toyota Camry for Revolution Racing in the K&N Pro Series East.

== NASCAR career ==
=== Corona Series ===
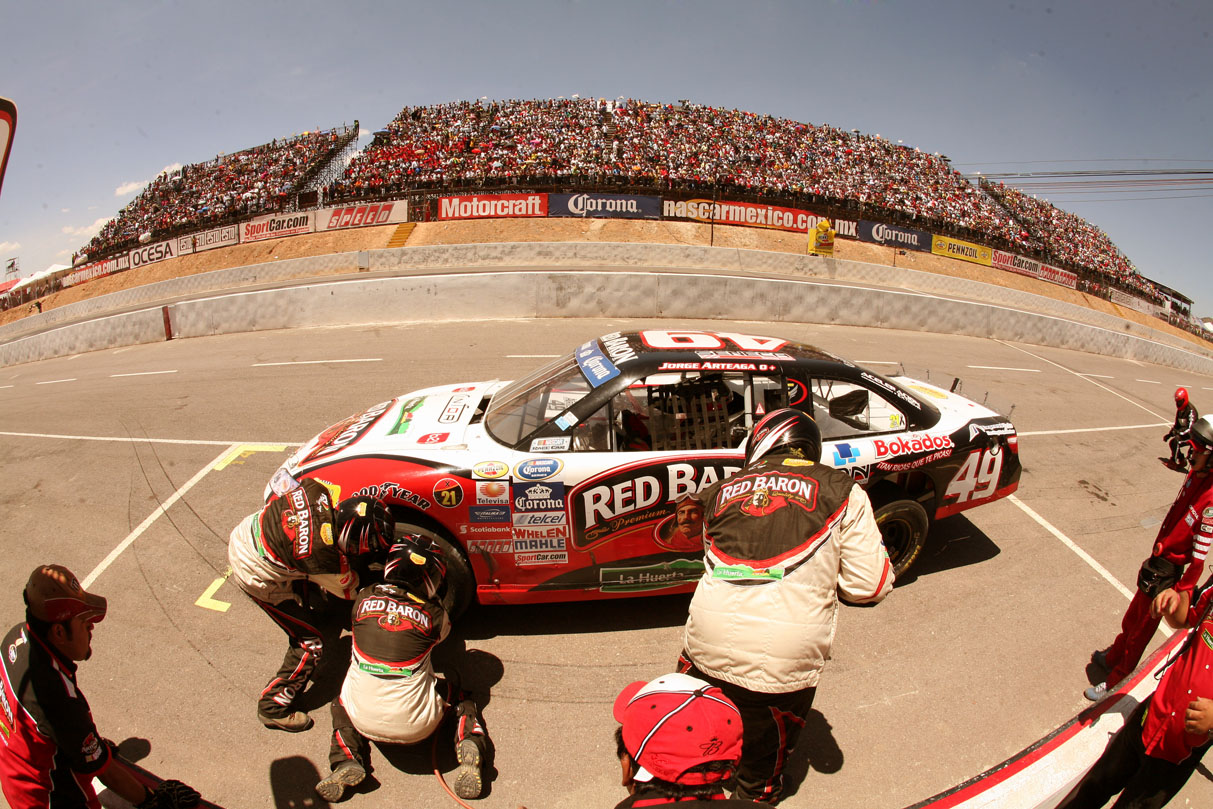
2009 Equipo Nutricion/Red Baron pitstop

Arteaga entered the NASCAR Corona Series after establishing himself at age 20 in the Mexico feeder T4 Series in 2007. After an impressive season, he made the transition to the NASCAR Corona Series for the 2008 season shortly after the franchise was established. His best season was in 2009, when he came in 14th in the overall rankings after making a series of top-ten finishes. In the 2010 season, he had three top-ten finishes in the first five races.

=== K&N Pro Series East ===
In July 2010, Arteaga made an impressive debut in NASCAR racing in the USA when he finished in the top-ten at the NASCAR K&N Pro Series East race at Lee USA Speedway. He worked his way up to sixth place before accidents in the last few laps dropped him down the field to tenth position.

Arteaga made the move to a full-time effort in the K&N Pro Series East in 2012, driving the No. 8 Toyota Camry for Revolution Racing. In 13 starts, Arteaga posted two top-ten finishes and finished 14th in the standings, despite missing one race.

==== The Most Popular Driver 2009 ====
In 2009, Arteaga was voted the most popular driver in the NASCAR Mexico Series by the fans in an official vote posted on NASCAR.com. He received 34% of the vote, a majority of 23%.

=== FCV Racing ===
Arteaga raced for FCV Racing alongside experienced NASCAR driver Carlos Contreras (the first Hispanic driver to run in NASCAR). The team was established in 2006 and has racing experience in both the US and Mexican NASCAR series. Arteaga scored his first pole position at Aguascalientes in 2010.

=== NASCAR K&N Pro Series ===
Jorge began racing in the United States in 2010, acting as an ambassador for NASCAR's Drive for Diversity Program, and working in Revolution Racing alongside drivers such as Mackena Bell and Sergio Peña. He scored a Top 10 finish in his series debut. He parted ways with FCV Racing after the September race at Querétaro, changing his number to 46. Since then, he has been struggling in the Mexican series. Jorge and his sponsors moved to a new team, with help from one of the series' top drivers, Jose Luis Ramirez, and purchased a race car from Carlos Anaya, a driver with limited economic resources.

=== NASCAR Corona Series Results ===
(key) (Races in bold indicate pole position)

Year	Team	No.	Sponsor	Make	1	2	3	4	5	6	7	8	9	10	11	12	13	14	NSCC	Points
2010	FCV Racing	**49**	Equipo Nutricion/Red Baron	Dodge	AGS; 9	QRO; 29	SLP; 10	TXT; 23	D.F. 7	PUE; 17	GDL; 4*	MTY; 11	SLP; 6	D.F. 11	QRO; 14	PUE; 12	TXT	AGS		

- After the race in Guadalajara he was given a 20sec penalty dropping him to 13th.

== Reality TV Series ==
During the 2010 racing season, Arteaga was filmed for a reality TV series entitled NASCAR Mexico 24/7 which followed the behind-the-scenes happenings of NASCAR from the perspective of the FCV Racing Team. It was broadcast on Speed TV in Latin America during race weeks.

== Social responsibility ==
=== Equipo Nutricion ===
Equipo Nutricion (The Nutrition Team) was established by Arteaga in partnership with La Huerta and Red Baron to provide support to Mexico's poor and malnourished. After each race he works with local government and institutions to donate 12 tonnes of frozen vegetables to those who need it most in the municipality of the racetrack. He has pledged to increase his donation to 22 tonnes after each race he wins. During the 2009 season he donated 190 tonnes of frozen vegetables. Along with their donations, they aim to raise awareness for malnutrition and obesity by conducting chats in schools to combat the problem at a grassroots level.

Nowadays, Arteaga runs his own company, named "Holistic", a artisanal frozen goods company based in his hometown Aguascalientes.

== See also ==
- Carlos Contreras (Team Mate)
- NASCAR Corona Series
- Speed TV
