= Otto Guibovich =

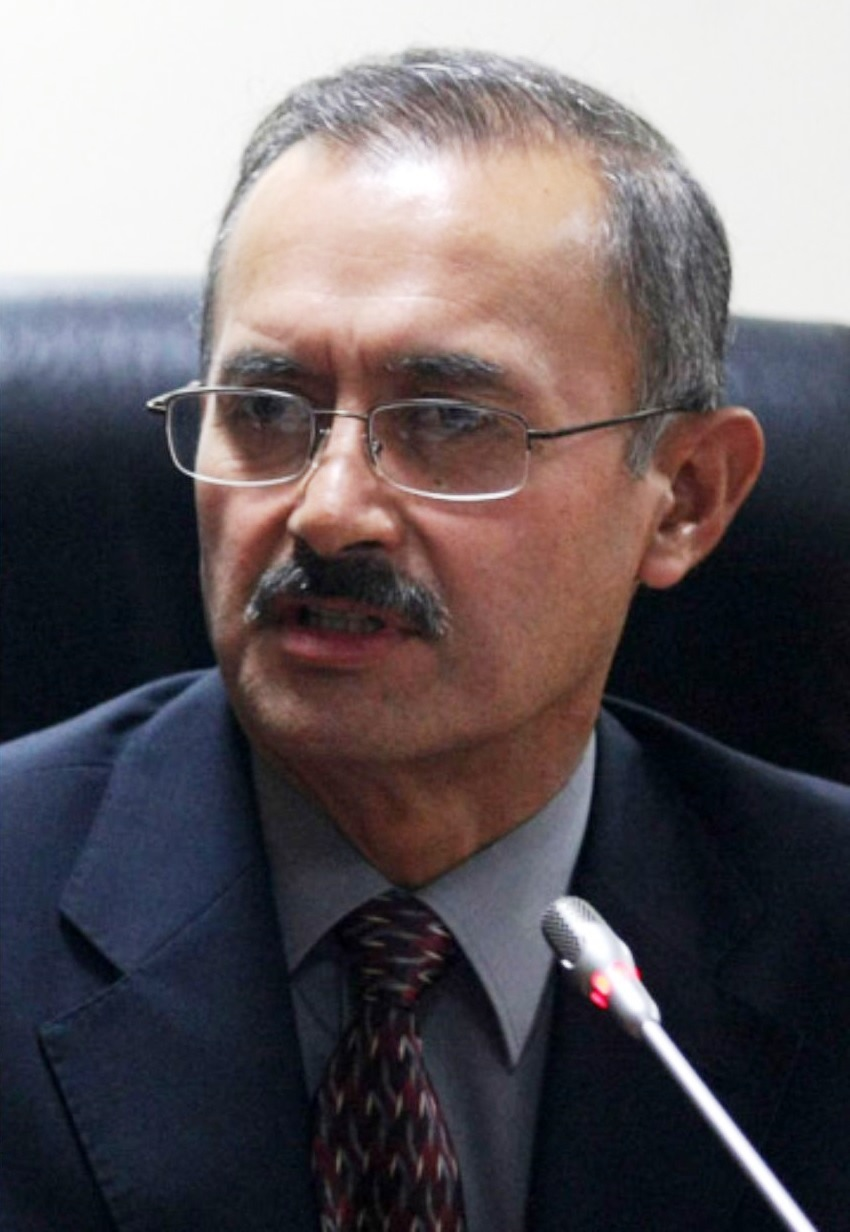

Member of Congress
- In office 16 March 2020 – 26 July 2021
- Constituency: Ancash

Personal details
- Born: December 12, 1953 (age 72) Macate, Santa, Ancash, Peru
- Party: Popular Action
- Nickname: Comando

Military service
- Allegiance: Peruvian
- Branch/service: Peruvian Army
- Years of service: 1973-2010
- Rank: General
- Commands: Army Commanding General; Center Military Region
- Battles/wars: Internal conflict in Peru

Otto Napoleón Guibovich Arteaga (born December 12, 1953) is a Peruvian politician and a former soldier who served as the Commanding General of the Peruvian Army from 2008 to 2010. General Guibovich previously served as commander of the Center Military Region. He assumed his assignment on December 5, 2008, replacing General Edwin Donayre.

== Biography ==
Otto Guibovich was born in the city of Macate-Santa-Ancash, in northern Peru in 1953. In March 1973 he joined the Military School of Chorrillos, graduating as a Sub Lieutenant in January 1976. He is married to Lourdes La Rosa Diez and have two children, Claudia and Jose Miguel.

== Military career ==
Guibovich's career as a soldier and an officer began with his education at the Peruvian Chorrillos Military School.

His military career began as Head of the Central Section Mortars Shooting Motorized Infantry Battalion No. 5 Zarumilla, continuing in the Army Special Forces. He studied in the former Soviet Union and the United Kingdom (England). He was guest instructor at the School of Infantry United States Army in North America and Military Attache to the Embassy of Peru in Cuba.

He has also been an instructor at the Army Command School, Instructor at the Military School of Chorrillos, Commander of the Counter Subversive Battalion No. 313 in Tingo Maria, Exchange Officer and Instructor at the School of Infantry United States Army, Chief Battalion Cadet EMCH, Instructor in the School of War, Chief of Operations of the 2nd Infantry Brigade - Ayacucho Battalion Commander Command No. 19, Military Attache in the Republic of Cuba, Commander General 1st Special Forces Brigade and Deputy Director of Army Welfare, Director of Army Health. He has served as Chief of the Central Military Region Commander of Operational Command Center and Chief of Joint Staff of the Armed Forces.

On December 4, 2008, he was appointed Army Commander General of Peru, one by order signed by President Alan Garcia and Defense Minister Antero Florez Araoz.

He left the position and the military in 2010.

=== Commanding General ===
Guibovich's tenure as Commanding General ran from 2008 to 2010.

== Political career ==
In the 2020 snap parliamentary elections, he was elected Congressman representing the Ancash Region under the Popular Action party and took office on 16 March 2020.

During his parliamentary term, he is part of the Audit and Comptroller commissions; of National Defense, Internal Order, Alternative Development and the Fight against Drugs and Intelligence. Similarly, it is part of the Permanent Commission.

Guibovich was in favor of Vizcarra's removal during the two processes, the second of which ended up removing the former president from power. The congressman supported the motion being one of the 105 parliamentarians who voted in favor of the removal of President Martín Vizcarra.

== See also ==
- Peruvian Army

Military offices
| Preceded by General Edwin Donayre | Commander-in-Chief of the Peruvian Army; 2008 – 2010 | Succeeded by Paul Da Silva |
