= Carlos Contreras (racing driver) =

Mexican racing driver (born 1970)

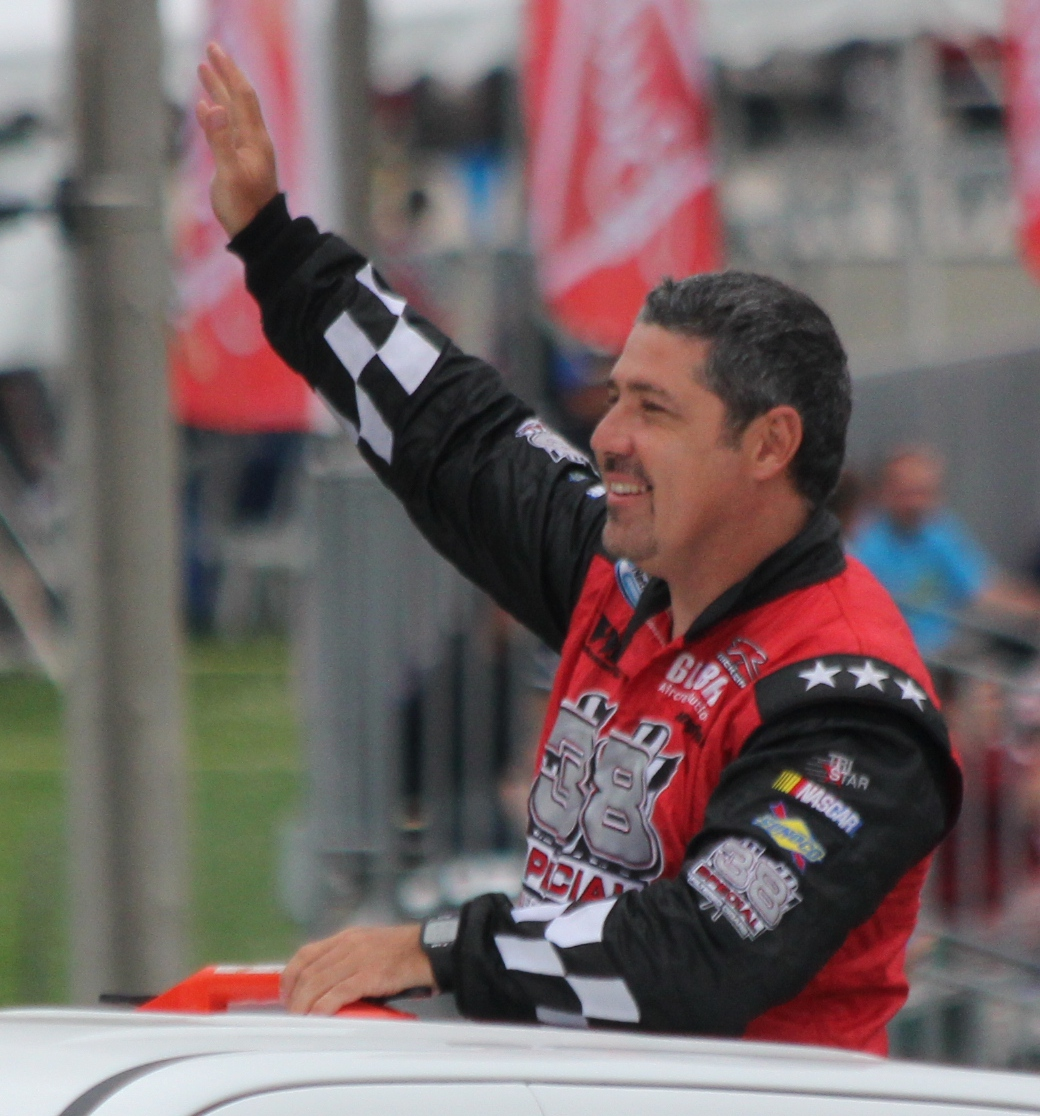
- Contreras at Road America in 2014
- Born: June 8, 1970 (age 56); Mexico City, Mexico

NASCAR O'Reilly Auto Parts Series career
- 35 races run over 6 years
- 2015 position: 56th
- Best finish: 30th (2014)
- First race: 2003 1-800-Pitshop.com 300 (California)
- Last race: 2015 Ford EcoBoost 300 (Homestead)
Wins	Top tens	Poles
0	0	0

NASCAR FedEx Freight Truck Series career
- 75 races run over 6 years
- 2016 position: 59th
- Best finish: 14th (2001)
- First race: 1999 NAPA Auto Parts 200 (California)
- Last race: 2016 DC Solar 350 (Las Vegas)
Wins	Top tens	Poles
0	5	0

NASCAR Mexico Series career
- 76 races run over 6 years
- Best finish: 15th (2010)
- First race: 2008 Race No. 1 (Querétaro)
- Last race: 2013 Mexico Final 200 (Mexico City)
Wins	Top tens	Poles
12	23	2
- Statistics up to date as of October 1, 2016.

Carlos Contreras (born June 8, 1970) is a Mexican former professional stock car racing driver and crew chief. He was the first Mexico-born driver racing full-time in any NASCAR national series. He has competed in the NASCAR Camping World Truck Series and NASCAR Xfinity Series.

== NASCAR career ==
=== Xfinity Series ===
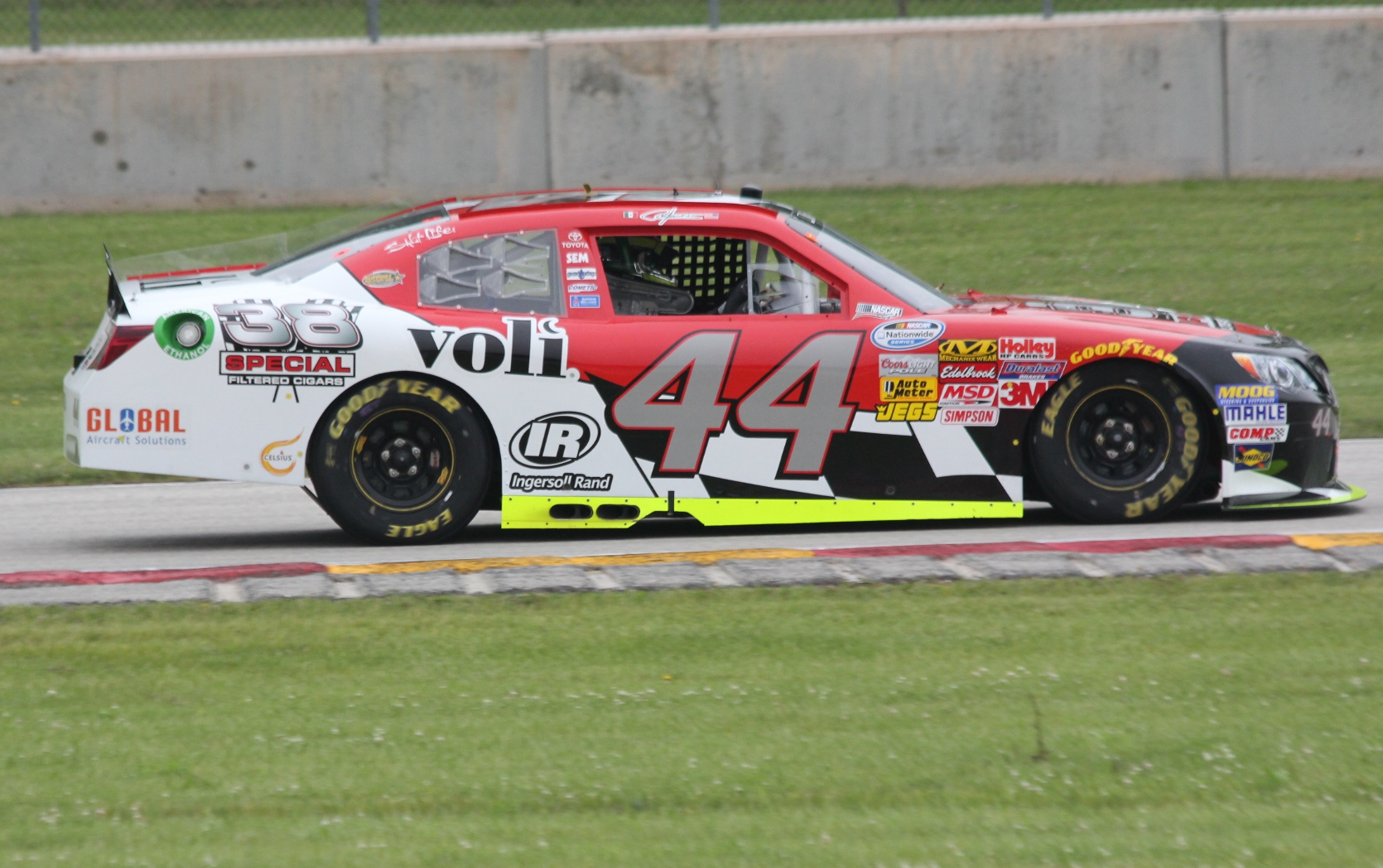
Contreras racing in the Nationwide Series at Road America in 2014

Contreras made his first Busch Series attempt in 2002 with the Hispanic Racing Team. Driving the No. 09 Chevrolet at Homestead-Miami, he was unable to break into the field. He would his debut in 2003 with Jay Robinson Racing. At California Speedway, Contreras put the No. 49 Ford in the field and finished in the 26th position. He also made one start for Innovative Motorsports at Homestead-Miami. He drove the No. 48 Chevrolet to a 17th-place finish. In 2005 he would return to the Busch Series with Fitz Motorsports. He drove the No. 40 Dodge in five races and the No. 12 Dodge in one race. His best finish would come at Homestead-Miami, where he would finish 25th. For the 2006 season, Contreras again returned to Fitz Motorsports, where he competed in races with the No. 12 team and the No. 14 teams. He best finish on the season was an 11th at Autodromo Hermanos Rodriguez.

In 2014, Contreras returned to the Nationwide Series, competing in a limited number of races for Rick Ware Racing.

=== Camping World Truck Series ===
Contreras debuted at the 1999 NAPA Auto Parts 200 at California Speedway with the No. 68 Dodge. He would drive the car to a 14th-place finish in his first race. In 2000, he competed in the full season for Impact Motorsports in No. 12 Dodge. He has two top tens during the season and finished 17th in points. He moved to Petty Enterprises in 2001. He would again post two top-tens on the season and move up to 14th in the overall points standings. For the 2002 season, Contreras returned to the series with Petty Enterprises and again turned in another solid season. He would post one top-ten on the season and would rank 16th in the overall point standings. He made his return to the Truck Series in 2010 after it was renamed the Camping World Truck Series, driving the No. 00 Chevy for the 2010 NextEra Energy Resources 250 for the first time since 2002, finishing 14th.

== Motorsports career results ==
=== NASCAR ===
(key) (Bold – Pole position awarded by qualifying time. Italics – Pole position earned by points standings or practice time. * – Most laps led.)

==== Xfinity Series ====
NASCAR Xfinity Series results
Year	Team	No.	Make	1	2	3	4	5	6	7	8	9	10	11	12	13	14	15	16	17	18	19	20	21	22	23	24	25	26	27	28	29	30	31	32	33	34	35	NXSC	Pts	Ref
2002	Hispanic Racing Team	09	Chevy	DAY	CAR	LVS	DAR	BRI	TEX	NSH	TAL	CAL	RCH	NHA	NZH	CLT	DOV	NSH	KEN	MLW	DAY	CHI	GTY	PPR	IRP	MCH	BRI	DAR	RCH	DOV	KAN	CLT	MEM	ATL	CAR	PHO	HOM; DNQ		NA	-	
2003	Jay Robinson Racing	49	Ford	DAY	CAR	LVS	DAR	BRI	TEX	TAL	NSH	CAL; 26	RCH	GTY	NZH	CLT	DOV	NSH	KEN	MLW	DAY	CHI	NHA	PPR	IRP	MCH	BRI	DAR	RCH	DOV	KAN	CLT	MEM	ATL	PHO	CAR			92nd	197	
2003	Innovative Motorsports	48	Chevy																																		HOM; 17		92nd	197	
2005	FitzBradshaw Racing	40	Dodge	DAY	CAL	MXC; 36	LVS	ATL	NSH	BRI	TEX	PHO	TAL	DAR	RCH	CLT	DOV	NSH	KEN	MLW	DAY	CHI	NHA	PPR	GTY	IRP	GLN; 32	MCH	BRI		RCH	DOV	KAN; 38	CLT	MEM	TEX	PHO; 30	HOM; 25	77th	396	
2005	FitzBradshaw Racing	12	Dodge																											CAL; 33									77th	396	
2006	FitzBradshaw Racing	14	Dodge	DAY	CAL	MXC; 11																																HOM; 33	69th	437	
2006	FitzBradshaw Racing	12	Dodge				LVS	ATL	BRI	TEX	NSH	PHO	TAL	RCH	DAR	CLT	DOV	NSH	KEN	MLW	DAY	CHI	NHA	MAR; 29	GTY	IRP	GLN; 32	MCH	BRI	CAL; 38	RCH	DOV	KAN	CLT	MEM; 39	TEX	PHO		69th	437	
2007	Fitz Motorsports	22	Dodge	DAY	CAL	MXC; 35	LVS	ATL	BRI	NSH	TEX	PHO	TAL	RCH	DAR	CLT	DOV	NSH																					129th	97	
2007	Fitz Motorsports	44	Dodge																KEN; 43	MLW	NHA	DAY	CHI	GTY	IRP	CGV	GLN	MCH	BRI	CAL	RCH	DOV	KAN	CLT	MEM	TEX	PHO	HOM	129th	97	
2014	Rick Ware Racing	15	Ford	DAY; DNQ																																			30th	204	
2014	Rick Ware Racing	23	Chevy		PHO; 29	LVS	BRI	CAL; 29	TEX	DAR; 24	RCH	TAL	IOW; 33	CLT; 33	DOV	MCH				NHA; 35	CHI	IND	IOW				ATL; 37	RCH	CHI	KEN	DOV	KAN	CLT; 29			HOM; 32			30th	204	
2014	TriStar Motorsports	44	Toyota														ROA; 15	KEN						GLN; 23	MOH; 21	BRI													30th	204	
2014	Rick Ware Racing	87	Chevy																DAY; 34															TEX; 38	PHO				30th	204	
2015	Rick Ware Racing	15	Chevy	DAY; DNQ	ATL	LVS	PHO	CAL	TEX	BRI; 36	RCH; 34	TAL; DNQ	IOW	CLT	DOV	MCH	CHI	DAY	KEN	NHA	IND	IOW	GLN	MOH; 36	BRI	ROA	DAR; 37	RCH	CHI	KEN	DOV	CLT	KAN	TEX	PHO	HOM; 36			56th	41	

==== Camping World Truck Series ====
NASCAR Camping World Truck Series results
Year	Team	No.	Make	1	2	3	4	5	6	7	8	9	10	11	12	13	14	15	16	17	18	19	20	21	22	23	24	25	NCWTC	Pts	Ref
1999	Impact Motorsports	68	Dodge	HOM	PHO	EVG	MMR	MAR	MEM	PPR	I70	BRI	TEX	PIR	GLN	MLW	NSV	NZH	MCH	NHA	IRP	GTY	HPT	RCH	LVS	LVL	TEX	CAL; 14	84th	121	
2000	Impact Motorsports	12	Dodge	DAY; 13	HOM; 33	PHO; 21	MMR; 27	MAR; 22	PIR; 18	GTY; 18	MEM; 18	PPR; 30	EVG; 19	TEX; 20	KEN	GLN; 8	MLW; 11	NHA; 21	NZH; 18	MCH; 20	IRP; 27	NSV; 19	CIC; 15	RCH; 19	DOV; 10	TEX; 15	CAL; 26		17th	2414	
2001	Petty Enterprises	43	Dodge	DAY; 20	HOM; 7	MMR; 22	MAR; 11	GTY; 21	DAR; 27	PPR; 29	DOV; 12	TEX; 9	MEM; 27	MLW; 22	KAN; 12	KEN; 16	NHA; 21	IRP; 14	NSH; 17	CIC; 15	NZH; 16	RCH; 23	SBO; 17	TEX; 23	LVS; 20	PHO; 21	CAL; 22		14th	2586	
2002	Petty Enterprises	43	Dodge	DAY; 8	DAR; 17	MAR; 28	GTY; 16	PPR; 13	DOV; 23	TEX; 18	MEM; 15	MLW; 22	KAN; 16	KEN; 22	NHA; 15	MCH; 17	IRP; 31	NSH; 13	RCH; 19	TEX; 30	SBO; 23	LVS; 13	CAL; 18	PHO; 19	HOM; 24				16th	2334	
2010	Daisy Ramirez Motorsports	00	Chevy	DAY; 14	ATL	MAR	NSH	KAN	DOV	CLT	TEX	MCH	IOW	GTY	IRP	POC	NSH	DAR	BRI	CHI	KEN	NHA	LVS	MAR	TAL	TEX	PHO	HOM	89th	126	
2016	Contreras Motorsports	71	Chevy	DAY; DNQ	ATL; 27	MAR	KAN	DOV	CLT	TEX; 31	IOW	GTW	KEN	ELD	POC; 27	BRI	MCH	MSP	CHI	NHA	LVS; 30	TAL	MAR	TEX	PHO	HOM			59th	17	

==== West Series ====
NASCAR West Series results
Year	Team	No.	Make	1	2	3	4	5	6	7	8	9	10	11	12	13	NWSC	Pts	Ref
2007	Fitz Motorsports	12	Dodge	CTS	PHO	AMP	ELK	IOW	CNS	SON; 22	DCS	IRW	MMP	EVG	CSR	AMP	61st	97	

^{*} Season still in progress
^{1} Ineligible for series points
