= Chief of the Joint Command (Peru) =

Highest ranking military officer in the Peruvian Armed Forces

Chief of the Joint Command of the Armed Forces
- Jefe del Comando Conjunto de las Fuerzas Armadas del Perú
- Seal of the CCFFAA

- Flag for the Chief of the CCFFAA

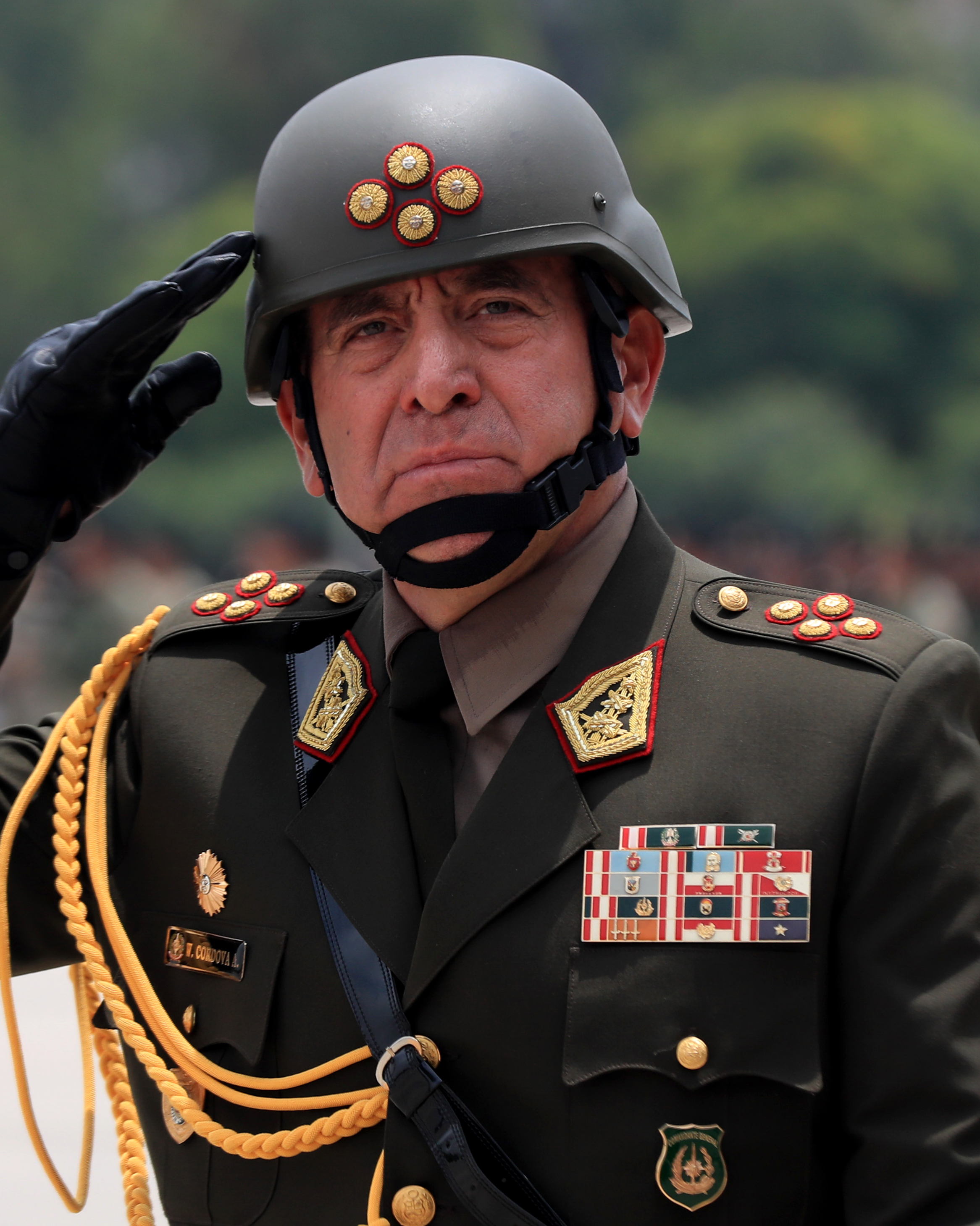
- Incumbent; General David Ojeda Parra since 28 December 2023
- Ministry of Defence
- Type: Chief of Defence
- Abbreviation: Jefe del CCFFAA
- Member of: Joint Command of the Armed Forces of Peru
- Reports to: Minister of Defence
- Residence: Calle Nicolás Corpancho 298 - Santa Beatriz
- Nominator: Minister of Defence
- Appointer: President
- Formation: 1 February 1957
- First holder: Manuel Cossío Cossío
- Website: Official website

The Chief of the Joint Command of the Peruvian Armed Forces (Spanish: Jefe del Comando Conjunto de las Fuerzas Armadas del Perú) is the professional head of the Peruvian Armed Forces. He is responsible for the administration and the operational control of the Peruvian military.

== List of chiefs ==
=== Chief of the Joint Command ===
No.	Picture	Name	Took office	Left office	Time in office	Defence branch	Ref.
1	Víctor Bustamante Reátegui	General; Víctor Bustamante Reátegui	January 2003	December 2003	11 months	Peruvian Army	
2	Aurelio Crovetto Yañez	General; Aurelio Crovetto Yañez	January 2004	December 2004	11 months	Peruvian Air Force	
3	Frank Boyle Alvarado	Admiral; Frank Boyle Alvarado	January 2005	18 December 2005	11 months	Peruvian Navy	
4	José Williams Zapata	General; José Williams Zapata	5 December 2005	4 December 2006	11 months	Peruvian Army	.
5	Jorge Montoya Manrique [es]	Admiral; Jorge Montoya Manrique	January 2007	December 2008	1 year, 11 months	Peruvian Navy	.
6	José Aste Daffos	Admiral; José Aste Daffos	January 2008	December 2008	11 months	Peruvian Navy	.
7	Francisco Contreras Rivas	General; Francisco Contreras Rivas	January 2009	December 2010	1 year, 11 months	Peruvian Army	.
8	Ricardo Howell Ballena	General; Ricardo Howell Ballena	January 2011	December 2011	11 months	Peruvian Army	
9	José Cueto Aservi [es]	Admiral; José Cueto Aservi	May 2012	December 2013	1 year, 7 months	Peruvian Navy	.
10	Leonel Cabrera [es]	General; Leonel Cabrera	December 2013	December 2014	1 year	Peruvian Army	.
11	Jorge Moscoso [es]	Admiral; Jorge Moscoso (born 1958)	January 2014	December 2016	2 years, 11 months	Peruvian Navy	.
12	José Paredes Lora	Admiral; José Paredes Lora	January 2016	30 October 2018	2 years, 9 months	Peruvian Navy	
13	César Astudillo Salcedo	General; César Astudillo Salcedo (born 1960)	30 October 2018	28 July 2021	2 years, 8 months	Peruvian Army	
14	Manuel Gómez de la Torre [es]	General; Manuel Gómez de la Torre (born 1963)	28 July 2021	27 December 2023	2 years, 4 months	Peruvian Army	
15	David Ojeda Parra	General; David Ojeda Parra	28 December 2023	Incumbent	2 years, 8 months	Peruvian Army	.
