= José Luis Pérez de Arteaga =

José Luis Pérez de Arteaga (13 April 1950 – 8 February 2017) was a Spanish announcer, critic, journalist, and musicologist.

== Biography ==
In 1985, he began to direct and present El mundo de la fonografía in Radio Clásica, a station centered on the area of recorded sound, in discography novelties, historical productions, commemorations and ephemeris, and always evoked through phonographic records. In Radio 1, he was a collaborator of El ojo crítico and, in Radio Exterior, directed En clave de 5. His voice was also habitual in the re-transmissions of the Vienna New Year's Concert for TVE and in the re-transmissions of the concerts of the National Orchestra and Choir of Spain. He wrote several books on the composer Gustav Mahler; in fact, he was considered one of the most important biographers of Mahler in the country. He had dedicated two volumes about his life and his work and also made a complete record inventory of him.

He was formed musically in Spain and later in the Guildhall School of Music and Drama in London. He studied piano with Rosa María Kucharski. He wrote thousands of articles and musical critiques for Ritmo and Scherzo magazines, the Diverdi newsletter, and the ABC, La Razón, and El País newspapers. From 1981 to 1985, he was the director of the Enciclopedia Salvat de la Música.

According to Pérez de Arteaga, his radio mentor was Rafael Taibo.

== Bibliography ==
- La cultura española durante el franquismo (1977)
- Cine para leer (1988)
- François Truffaut (1988).
- Gustav Mahler (1986)
- La música de cámara de Shostakovich (first critical edition, 1991).
- Mahler (2008) 2nd edition (2011)
