= Jorge Arteaga (footballer, born 1998) =

Peruvian footballer

Personal information
- Full name: Jorge Martín Arteaga
- Date of birth: 26 November 1998 (age 27)
- Place of birth: Lima, Peru
- Height: 1.87 m (6 ft 2 in)
- Position: Goalkeeper

Youth career
- Esther Grande
- 2016–2017: Deportivo Municipal

Senior career*
Years	Team	Apps	(Gls)
2017–2021	Deportivo Municipal	1	(0)
2022–2023	Deportivo Coopsol	5	(0)
- * Club domestic league appearances and goals as of 19:49, 3 September 2023 (UTC)

Jorge Martín Arteaga (born 26 November 1998) is a Peruvian footballer who plays as a goalkeeper.

== Career ==
=== Club career ===
Arteaga joined Deportivo Municipal from Esther Grande in mid-2016. On 28 May 2017, 18-year Arteaga got his official Peruvian Primera División debut for Deportivo Municipal against Sport Rosario. Starting goalkeeper, Erick Delgado, received a red card after 65 minutes, why Arteaga was subbed in to his first professional game. Arteaga was the fourth choice in that season.

In the 2018 season, he was only on the bench for one game, while he in the 2019 season wasn't on the bench for a single game. At the end of November 2021 Deportivo Municipal confirmed, that Arteaga would leave the club at the end of the year.

Ahead of the 2022 season, Arteaga joined Deportivo Coopsol.
