= 2009 FIA GT Tourist Trophy =

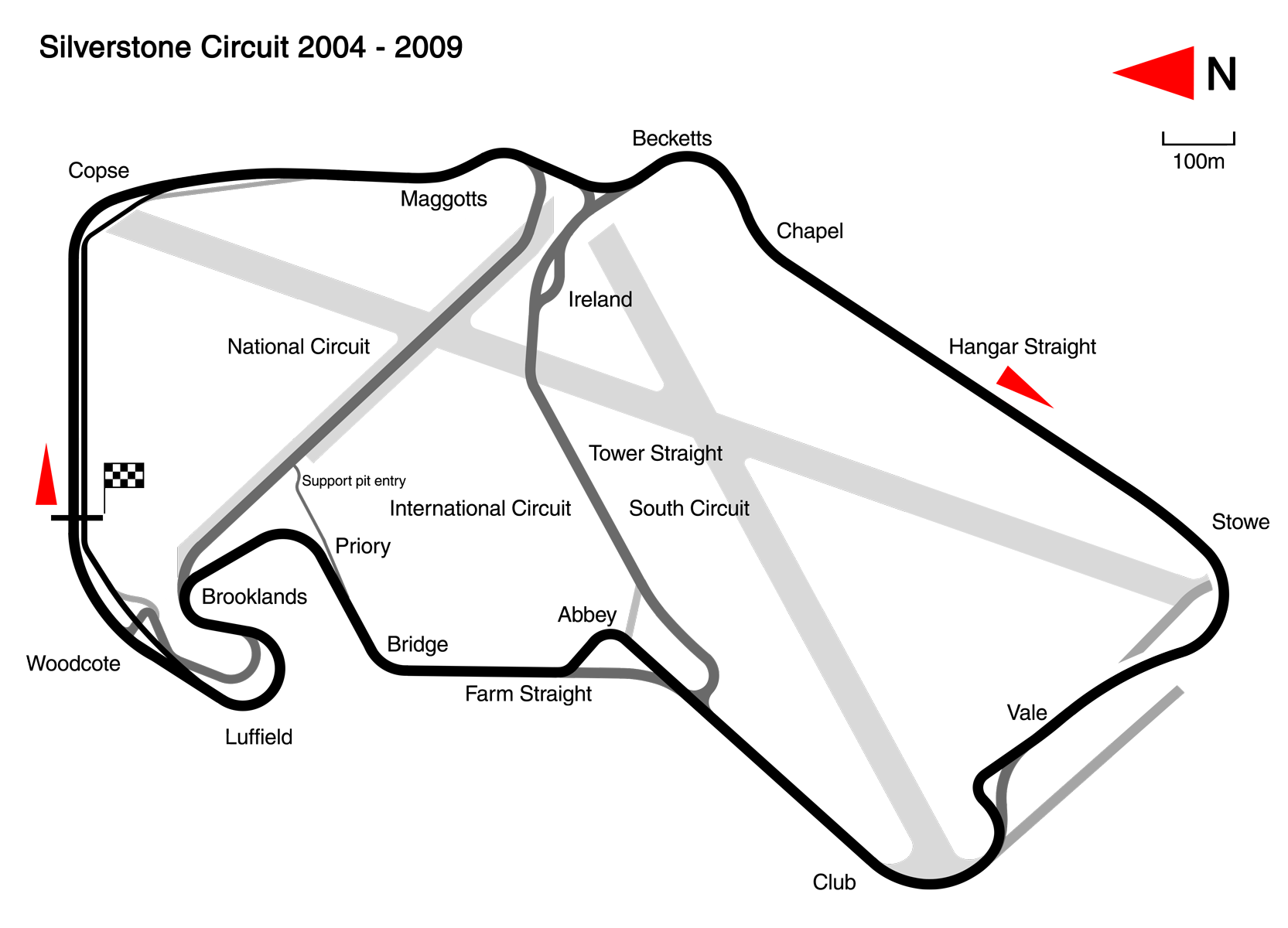
Map of the Silverstone Circuit (2004-2009)

The 2009 FIA GT Tourist Trophy was the first round of the 2009 FIA GT Championship season and the 62nd running of the RAC Tourist Trophy. It was held at the Silverstone Circuit, United Kingdom on 3 May 2009. It featured the race debut of the Ford GT and the Nissan GT-R in the GT1 category in preparation for their entry in the 2010 FIA GT1 World Championship.

== Report ==
=== Qualifying ===
The #80 Hexis Racing Aston Martin was moved to the back of the starting grid after failing post-qualifying technical inspection. The car was found to be below the minimum ride height and carrying components of an incorrect size.

==== Qualifying result ====
Pole position winners in each class are marked in bold.

Pos	Class	Team	Qualifying Driver	Lap Time
1	**GT1**	**#14 K Plus K Motorsport**	**Karl Wendlinger**	**1:42.216**
2	GT1	#1 Vitaphone Racing	Andrea Bertolini	1:43.150
3	GT1	#2 Vitaphone Racing	Alex Müller	1:43.576
4	GT1	#4 PK Carsport	Mike Hezemans	1:43.792
5	GT1	#19 Luc Alphand Aventures	Guillaume Moreau	1:44.039
6	GT1	#18 K Plus K Motorsport	Mario Domínguez	1:44.361
7	GT1	#3 Selleslagh Racing Team	Bert Longin	1:44.892
8	GT1	#9 DKR Engineering	Jos Menten	1:44.894
9	GT1	#11 Full Speed Racing Team	Luke Hines	1:46.146
10	GT1	#40 Marc VDS Racing Team	Bas Leinders	1:46.567
11	GT1	#35 Nissan Motorsports	Michael Krumm	1:47.217
12	GT1	#44 Matech GT Racing	Thomas Mutsch	1:47.270
13	**GT2**	**#50 AF Corse**	**Gianmaria Bruni**	**1:50.230**
14	GT2	#97 Brixia Racing	Martin Ragginger	1:50.477
15	GT2	#55 CRS Racing	Tim Mullen	1:50.485
16	GT2	#51 AF Corse	Álvaro Barba	1:50.524
17	GT2	#56 CRS Racing	Andrew Kirkaldy	1:50.538
18	GT2	#60 Prospeed Competition	Richard Westbrook	1:50.659
19	GT2	#95 PeCom Racing Team	Matías Russo	1:50.907
20	GT2	#77 BMS Scuderia Italia	Matteo Malucelli	1:50.932
21	GT2	#59 Trackspeed Racing	Tim Sugden	1:51.118
22	GT2	#61 Prospeed Competition	Marco Holzer	1:51.320
23	GT2	#78 BMS Scuderia Italia	Kenneth Heyer	1:53.207
24	**G3**	**#150 Red Racing**	**Iradj Alexander**	**1:54.043**
25	GT2	#80 Hexis Racing AMR	Frédéric Makowiecki	1:50.305

=== Race ===
Austrian Karl Wendlinger and Brit Ryan Sharp won their second successive RAC Tourist Trophy after having won the event the previous year for Jetalliance Racing. The GT2 category was led by the Porsche of Prospeed Competition.

==== Race result ====
Class winners in bold. Cars failing to complete 75% of winner's distance marked as Not Classified (NC).

Pos	Class	No	Team	Drivers	Chassis	Tyre	Laps
Pos	Class	No	Team	Drivers	Engine	Tyre	Laps
1	**GT1**	**14**	**(Czech Republic) K plus K Motorsport**	**(Austria) Karl Wendlinger (United Kingdom) Ryan Sharp**	**Saleen S7-R**	MI	**65**
1	**GT1**	**14**	**(Czech Republic) K plus K Motorsport**	**(Austria) Karl Wendlinger (United Kingdom) Ryan Sharp**	**Ford 7.0 L V8**	MI	**65**
2	GT1	1	(Germany) Vitaphone Racing Team	(Germany) Michael Bartels (Italy) Andrea Bertolini	Maserati MC12 GT1	MI	65
2	GT1	1	(Germany) Vitaphone Racing Team	(Germany) Michael Bartels (Italy) Andrea Bertolini	Maserati 6.0 L V12	MI	65
3	GT1	19	(France) Luc Alphand Aventures	(France) Guillaume Moreau (Netherlands) Xavier Maassen	Chevrolet Corvette C6.R	MI	65
3	GT1	19	(France) Luc Alphand Aventures	(France) Guillaume Moreau (Netherlands) Xavier Maassen	Chevrolet LS7.R 7.0 L V8	MI	65
4	GT1	4	(Belgium) PK Carsport	(Belgium) Anthony Kumpen (Netherlands) Mike Hezemans	Chevrolet Corvette C6.R	MI	65
4	GT1	4	(Belgium) PK Carsport	(Belgium) Anthony Kumpen (Netherlands) Mike Hezemans	Chevrolet LS7.R 7.0 L V8	MI	65
5	GT1	18	(Czech Republic) K plus K Motorsport	(Czech Republic) Adam Lacko (Mexico) Mario Domínguez	Saleen S7-R	MI	65
5	GT1	18	(Czech Republic) K plus K Motorsport	(Czech Republic) Adam Lacko (Mexico) Mario Domínguez	Ford 7.0 L V8	MI	65
6	GT1	3	(Belgium) Selleslagh Racing Team	(Belgium) Bert Longin (France) James Ruffier	Chevrolet Corvette C6.R	MI	65
6	GT1	3	(Belgium) Selleslagh Racing Team	(Belgium) Bert Longin (France) James Ruffier	Chevrolet LS7.R 7.0 L V8	MI	65
7	GT1	9	(Luxembourg) DKR Engineering	(Finland) Markus Palttala (Netherlands) Jos Menten	Chevrolet Corvette C6.R	MI	64
7	GT1	9	(Luxembourg) DKR Engineering	(Finland) Markus Palttala (Netherlands) Jos Menten	Chevrolet LS7.R 7.0 L V8	MI	64
8	GT1	44	(Switzerland) Matech GT Racing	(Germany) Thomas Mutsch (Italy) Thomas Biagi	Ford GT1	MI	64
8	GT1	44	(Switzerland) Matech GT Racing	(Germany) Thomas Mutsch (Italy) Thomas Biagi	Ford 5.0 L V8	MI	64
9	GT1	11	(Austria) Full Speed Racing Team	(Belgium) Stéphane Lémeret (United Kingdom) Luke Hines	Saleen S7-R	P	64
9	GT1	11	(Austria) Full Speed Racing Team	(Belgium) Stéphane Lémeret (United Kingdom) Luke Hines	Ford 7.0 L V8	P	64
10	GT1	40	(Belgium) Marc VDS Racing Team	(Belgium) Renaud Kuppens (Belgium) Bas Leinders	Ford GT1	MI	63
10	GT1	40	(Belgium) Marc VDS Racing Team	(Belgium) Renaud Kuppens (Belgium) Bas Leinders	Ford 5.0 L V8	MI	63
11	**GT2**	**60**	**(Belgium) Prospeed Competition**	**(France) Emmanuel Collard (United Kingdom) Richard Westbrook**	**Porsche 997 GT3-RSR**	MI	**62**
11	**GT2**	**60**	**(Belgium) Prospeed Competition**	**(France) Emmanuel Collard (United Kingdom) Richard Westbrook**	**Porsche 4.0 L Flat-6**	MI	**62**
12	GT2	95	(Argentina) PeCom Racing Team	(Argentina) Matías Russo (Argentina) Luís Pérez Companc	Ferrari F430 GT2	MI	62
12	GT2	95	(Argentina) PeCom Racing Team	(Argentina) Matías Russo (Argentina) Luís Pérez Companc	Ferrari 4.0 L V8	MI	62
13	GT2	56	(United Kingdom) CRS Racing	(United Kingdom) Rob Bell (United Kingdom) Andrew Kirkaldy	Ferrari F430 GT2	MI	62
13	GT2	56	(United Kingdom) CRS Racing	(United Kingdom) Rob Bell (United Kingdom) Andrew Kirkaldy	Ferrari 4.0 L V8	MI	62
14	GT2	77	(Italy) BMS Scuderia Italia	(Italy) Paolo Ruberti (Italy) Matteo Malucelli	Ferrari F430 GT2	MI	62
14	GT2	77	(Italy) BMS Scuderia Italia	(Italy) Paolo Ruberti (Italy) Matteo Malucelli	Ferrari 4.0 L V8	MI	62
15	GT2	51	(Italy) AF Corse	(Spain) Álvaro Barba (Italy) Niki Cadei	Ferrari F430 GT2	MI	62
15	GT2	51	(Italy) AF Corse	(Spain) Álvaro Barba (Italy) Niki Cadei	Ferrari 4.0 L V8	MI	62
16	GT2	61	(Belgium) Prospeed Competition	(Hong Kong) Darryl O'Young (Germany) Marco Holzer	Porsche 997 GT3-RSR	MI	62
16	GT2	61	(Belgium) Prospeed Competition	(Hong Kong) Darryl O'Young (Germany) Marco Holzer	Porsche 4.0 L Flat-6	MI	62
17	GT2	80	(France) Hexis Racing AMR	(France) Frédéric Makowiecki (Germany) Stefan Mücke	Aston Martin V8 Vantage GT2	MI	61
17	GT2	80	(France) Hexis Racing AMR	(France) Frédéric Makowiecki (Germany) Stefan Mücke	Aston Martin 4.5 L V8	MI	61
18	GT2	97	(Italy) Brixia Racing	(Italy) Luigi Lucchini (Austria) Martin Ragginger	Porsche 997 GT3-RSR	MI	61
18	GT2	97	(Italy) Brixia Racing	(Italy) Luigi Lucchini (Austria) Martin Ragginger	Porsche 3.8 L Flat-6	MI	61
19	GT2	55	(United Kingdom) CRS Racing	(Canada) Chris Niarchos (United Kingdom) Tim Mullen	Ferrari F430 GT2	MI	61
19	GT2	55	(United Kingdom) CRS Racing	(Canada) Chris Niarchos (United Kingdom) Tim Mullen	Ferrari 4.0 L V8	MI	61
20	GT2	78	(Italy) BMS Scuderia Italia	(Germany) Kenneth Heyer (Italy) Diego Romanini	Ferrari F430 GT2	MI	61
20	GT2	78	(Italy) BMS Scuderia Italia	(Germany) Kenneth Heyer (Italy) Diego Romanini	Ferrari 4.0 L V8	MI	61
21	**G3**	**150**	**(France) Red Racing**	**(France) Jean-Claude Lagniez (Switzerland) Iradj Alexander**	**Chevrolet Corvette Z06.R**	MI	**58**
21	**G3**	**150**	**(France) Red Racing**	**(France) Jean-Claude Lagniez (Switzerland) Iradj Alexander**	**Chevrolet 7.0 L V8**	MI	**58**
22 DNF	GT2	50	(Italy) AF Corse	(Italy) Gianmaria Bruni (Finland) Toni Vilander	Ferrari F430 GT2	MI	53
22 DNF	GT2	50	(Italy) AF Corse	(Italy) Gianmaria Bruni (Finland) Toni Vilander	Ferrari 4.0 L V8	MI	53
23 DNF	GT1	13	(Austria) Full Speed Racing Team	(Italy) Ferdinando Monfardini (France) Michel Orts	Saleen S7-R	P	39
23 DNF	GT1	13	(Austria) Full Speed Racing Team	(Italy) Ferdinando Monfardini (France) Michel Orts	Ford 7.0 L V8	P	39
24 DNF	GT1	2	(Germany) Vitaphone Racing Team	(Portugal) Miguel Ramos (Germany) Alex Müller	Maserati MC12 GT1	MI	28
24 DNF	GT1	2	(Germany) Vitaphone Racing Team	(Portugal) Miguel Ramos (Germany) Alex Müller	Maserati 6.0 L V12	MI	28
25 DNF	GT1	35	(Japan) Nissan Motorsports (United Kingdom) Gigawave Motorsports	(United Kingdom) Darren Turner (Germany) Michael Krumm	Nissan GT-R GT1	MI	28
25 DNF	GT1	35	(Japan) Nissan Motorsports (United Kingdom) Gigawave Motorsports	(United Kingdom) Darren Turner (Germany) Michael Krumm	Nissan 5.6 L V8	MI	28
26 DNF	GT2	59	(United Kingdom) Trackspeed Racing	(United Kingdom) Tim Sugden (United Kingdom) David Ashburn	Porsche 997 GT3-RSR	MI	24
26 DNF	GT2	59	(United Kingdom) Trackspeed Racing	(United Kingdom) Tim Sugden (United Kingdom) David Ashburn	Porsche 4.0 L Flat-6	MI	24

FIA GT Championship
Previous race: None	2009 season	Next race: FIA GT Adria 2 Hours
