= Hicare =

HiCare
- Formerly: Godrej HiCare; ISS HiCare
- Industry: Pest control
- Founded: 2004; 22 years ago
- Founder: Arumugham Mahendran
- Area served: India
- Services: Bed bugs Control, Cockroach Control, Rodent Control, Mosquito Control, Termite inspection, Termite Control, Wood Borers Control, Bird Control
- Parent: Rentokil Initial (through Pest Control India)
- Website: hicare.in

HiCare is an Indian pest control services company providing pest management services to residential and commercial customers. Its services include cockroach, bed bugs, termite, rodent, mosquito and other pest control. HiCare was established in 2004 as part of the Godrej Group and was subsequently owned by ISS Facility Services and private equity firm India Value Fund Advisors, later known as True North. In 2024, HiCare was acquired by Rentokil Initial through its Indian pest control business, Pest Control India (PCI).

== History ==
=== Godrej HiCare ===
HiCare was established in 2004 as part of the Godrej Group's expansion into pest control services. The business was associated with Arumugham Mahendran, who had previously founded Transelektra Domestic Products, the company behind the Good Knight mosquito-repellent brand. Mahendran later developed Godrej HiCare as a pest management services business.

In April 2009, Godrej Industries sold its pest control services business, HiCare, to Denmark-based ISS Facility Services. Godrej Industries held an 80% stake in Godrej HiCare, while Mahendran held the remaining 20%. Following the transaction, HiCare became a wholly owned subsidiary of ISS.

=== ISS HiCare ===
Following its acquisition by ISS, HiCare operated as part of ISS Facility Services India and continued to develop its pest management services business in India.

In 2014, private equity firm India Value Fund Advisors agreed to acquire a majority stake in ISS HiCare in partnership with Mahendran. India Value Fund was expected to invest approximately ₹150 crore in the transaction, with Mahendran retaining a minority interest.

=== Expansion ===
Following the 2014 acquisition, HiCare expanded its pest management operations and entered additional home services.

In 2017, the company announced plans to invest ₹100 crore to expand its professional cleaning services.

In the same year, HiCare entered the air-purification and home-cleaning segments. It partnered with Swedish air-purification company Blueair to market air purifiers in India.

=== Acquisition by Rentokil Initial ===
In April 2024, Rentokil Initial announced the acquisition of HiCare Services Private Limited through Pest Control India. At the time of the acquisition, Rentokil Initial described HiCare as the second-largest pest control company in India, with 30 branches and more than 1,000 employees. The company provided commercial, residential and termite pest control services and served customers including food producers, healthcare facilities, airports and hotels.

Rentokil Initial stated that HiCare had been owned by True North since 2014. The acquisition was made through Pest Control India, in which Rentokil Initial held a majority shareholding.

Following the acquisition, HiCare became part of Rentokil PCI's pest control operations in India.

== Services ==
HiCare provides pest management services to residential and commercial customers. Its services include:

- Cockroach control
- Bed bug control
- Mosquito control
- Rodent control
- Termite control
- Wood borer control

The company's services have also included fly control and bird management. Its website provides information about its pest management services.

== Products ==
Products listed in the HiCare and Pest Control India online store include pest control and prevention products for residential and commercial settings.

Examples of products listed in the online store include:

- AutoMos Mosquito Killer
- Trubble Gum Eco
- EcoLiz Spray
- Roban Rat Killer Cake
- RoachWIZ Cockroach Killer Gel
- PCI Experto Mosquito Bat
- Bug Seal Bed Bug Spray
- Portable MosSwatter
- HiCare Organic Floor Disinfectant
- Lite Fly & Insect Catcher
- Quick Snap Rat Trap
- HiCare Fly Kill Slim Zapper Machine
- Rentokil Lumnia Slim Electric Fly Trap
- HiCare Smart Fly & Insect Catcher Machine
- Rentokil Lumnia Compact Insect Trap
- MosClean White Mosquito Trap IH2
- MosClean Black Mosquito Trap Model IS1

== Ownership ==
HiCare was established as part of the Godrej Group in 2004. In 2009, Godrej Industries sold its pest control services business to ISS Facility Services, which became its sole owner.

In 2014, India Value Fund Advisors partnered with HiCare founder Arumugham Mahendran to acquire the business from ISS. India Value Fund Advisors subsequently became known as True North.

In 2024, Rentokil Initial acquired HiCare through Pest Control India, making the company part of Rentokil's Indian pest control operations.
