= 2008 British GT Championship =

Sports car racing season

Seasons
- ← 2007 2009 →

The 2008 British GT season was the 16th season of the British GT Championship. This was the first season with the new GT4 category, replacing the GTC category of previous years. Both championships were won at the Brands Hatch meeting in July, with Matt Nicoll-Jones and Stewart Linn securing the inaugural GT4 title in round 11, with James Gornall and Jon Barnes clinching the GT3 title, the following day in round 12.

== Rule changes ==
- All cars run on an Avon Tyres soft compound tyre, instead of having the option of a medium compound in 2007.

== Entry list ==
A total of twenty seven full season entries were announced on 6 March 2008.

2008 Entry List
Team	No.	Drivers	Class	Chassis	Engine	Rounds
(United States) Team RPM	1	(United Kingdom) Paul O'Neill	GT3	Dodge Viper Competition Coupe	Dodge 8.3L V10	1–8
(United States) Team RPM	1	(United Kingdom) Oliver Bryant	GT3	Dodge Viper Competition Coupe	Dodge 8.3L V10	9-12
(United States) Team RPM	1	(United Kingdom) Steve Clark	GT3	Dodge Viper Competition Coupe	Dodge 8.3L V10	1–12
(United States) Team RPM	1	(United Kingdom) Henry Fletcher	GT3	Dodge Viper Competition Coupe	Dodge 8.3L V10	14
(United States) Team RPM	1	(United Kingdom) Phil Keen	GT3	Dodge Viper Competition Coupe	Dodge 8.3L V10	14
(United States) Team RPM	2	(United Kingdom) Nick Foster	GT3	Dodge Viper Competition Coupe	Dodge 8.3L V10	All
(United States) Team RPM	2	(United Kingdom) Oliver Bryant	GT3	Dodge Viper Competition Coupe	Dodge 8.3L V10	1-8
(United States) Team RPM	2	(United Kingdom) Nigel Redwood	GT3	Dodge Viper Competition Coupe	Dodge 8.3L V10	9-14
(United States) Team RPM	7	(United Kingdom) Clint Bardwell	GT3	Dodge Viper Competition Coupe	Dodge 8.3L V10	1-2
(United States) Team RPM	7	(United Kingdom) Jason Templeman	GT3	Dodge Viper Competition Coupe	Dodge 8.3L V10	1-2
(United States) Team RPM	7	(United Kingdom) Steve Tandy	GT3	Dodge Viper Competition Coupe	Dodge 8.3L V10	14
(United States) Team RPM	7	(United Kingdom) Richard Evans	GT3	Dodge Viper Competition Coupe	Dodge 8.3L V10	14
(United States) Team RPM	50	(United Kingdom) Steve Tandy	GT4	Ginetta G50	Ford Cyclone 3.5L V6	1-4, 7-13
(United States) Team RPM	50	(United Kingdom) Richard Evans	GT4	Ginetta G50	Ford Cyclone 3.5L V6	5-6
(United States) Team RPM	50	(United Kingdom) Joe Osbourne	GT4	Ginetta G50	Ford Cyclone 3.5L V6	14
(United States) Team RPM	50	(United Kingdom) Phil Bailey	GT4	Ginetta G50	Ford Cyclone 3.5L V6	All
(United States) Team RPM	51	(United Kingdom) Joe Osbourne	GT4	Ginetta G50	Ford Cyclone 3.5L V6	1-13
(United States) Team RPM	51	(United Kingdom) Michael Broadhurst	GT4	Ginetta G50	Ford Cyclone 3.5L V6	1-2
(United States) Team RPM	51	(United Kingdom) Alex Mortimer	GT4	Ginetta G50	Ford Cyclone 3.5L V6	3-4
(United States) Team RPM	51	(Italy) Fulvio Mussi	GT4	Ginetta G50	Ford Cyclone 3.5L V6	5-6
(United States) Team RPM	51	(United Kingdom) Nigel Moore	GT4	Ginetta G50	Ford Cyclone 3.5L V6	7-10, 14
(United States) Team RPM	51	(United Kingdom) Richard Evans	GT4	Ginetta G50	Ford Cyclone 3.5L V6	11-13
(United States) Team RPM	51	(United Kingdom) Jamie Robinson	GT4	Ginetta G50	Ford Cyclone 3.5L V6	14
(United States) Team RPM	52	(United Kingdom) Charlie Hollings	GT4	Ginetta G50	Ford Cyclone 3.5L V6	1-2
(United States) Team RPM	52	(United Kingdom) Nigel Redwood	GT4	Ginetta G50	Ford Cyclone 3.5L V6	3-8
(United States) Team RPM	52	(United Kingdom) Bradley Ellis	GT4	Ginetta G50	Ford Cyclone 3.5L V6	9-10, 14
(United States) Team RPM	52	(United Kingdom) Nigel Moore	GT4	Ginetta G50	Ford Cyclone 3.5L V6	11-13
(United States) Team RPM	52	(Italy) Fulvio Mussi	GT4	Ginetta G50	Ford Cyclone 3.5L V6	1-4, 7-10
(United States) Team RPM	52	(United Kingdom) Colin Wilmott	GT4	Ginetta G50	Ford Cyclone 3.5L V6	5-6
(United States) Team RPM	52	(United Kingdom) Tom Kimber-Smith	GT4	Ginetta G50	Ford Cyclone 3.5L V6	13
(United States) Team RPM	52	(United Kingdom) Alex Mortimer	GT4	Ginetta G50	Ford Cyclone 3.5L V6	14
(United Kingdom) Chad Racing	3	(United Kingdom) Ben de Zille Butler	GT3	Ferrari F430 GT3	Ferrari 4.3L V8	1-2
(United Kingdom) Chad Racing	3	(United Kingdom) Guy Harrington	GT3	Ferrari F430 GT3	Ferrari 4.3L V8	1-2
(United Kingdom) Chad Racing	3	(United Kingdom) Richard Marsh	GT3	Ferrari F430 GT3	Ferrari 4.3L V8	5-8
(United Kingdom) Chad Racing	3	(United Kingdom) Anthony Reid	GT3	Ferrari F430 GT3	Ferrari 4.3L V8	5-8
(United Kingdom) Chad Racing	3	(United Kingdom) Peter Bamford	GT3	Ferrari F430 GT3	Ferrari 4.3L V8	9-10
(United Kingdom) Chad Racing	3	(Republic of Ireland) Matt Griffin	GT3	Ferrari F430 GT3	Ferrari 4.3L V8	9-10
(United Kingdom) Chad Racing	4	(United Kingdom) Peter Bamford	GT3	Ferrari F430 GT3	Ferrari 4.3L V8	1-8, 13-14
(United Kingdom) Chad Racing	4	(Republic of Ireland) Matt Griffin	GT3	Ferrari F430 GT3	Ferrari 4.3L V8	1-8, 13-14
(United Kingdom) Chad Racing	63	(United Kingdom) Peter Snowdon	GT4	Aston Martin V8 Vantage N24	Aston Martin 4.3L V8	1–2
(United Kingdom) Chad Racing	63	(United Kingdom) Mark Thomas	GT4	Aston Martin V8 Vantage N24	Aston Martin 4.3L V8	1–2
(United Kingdom) Trackspeed	5	(United Kingdom) David Ashburn	GT3	Porsche 911 GT3 Cup S	Porsche 3.8L Flat-6	1–6
(United Kingdom) Trackspeed	5	(United Kingdom) Richard Williams	GT3	Porsche 911 GT3 Cup S	Porsche 3.8L Flat-6	1–4
(United Kingdom) Trackspeed	5	(United Kingdom) Tim Harvey	GT3	Porsche 911 GT3 Cup S	Porsche 3.8L Flat-6	5-6
(Belgium) Matech GT Racing	6	(United Kingdom) Alex Mortimer	GT3	Ford GT GT3	Ford 5.0L V8	7-8
(Belgium) Matech GT Racing	6	(United Kingdom) Bradley Ellis	GT3	Ford GT GT3	Ford 5.0L V8	7-8
(United Kingdom) Tech 9 Motorsport	8	(United Kingdom) Oliver Morley	GT3	Lamborghini Gallardo LP560 GT3	Lamborghini 5.2L V10	1–8
(United Kingdom) Tech 9 Motorsport	8	(Russia) Leo Machitski	GT3	Lamborghini Gallardo LP560 GT3	Lamborghini 5.2L V10	9-10
(United Kingdom) Tech 9 Motorsport	8	(United Kingdom) Tom Ferrier	GT3	Lamborghini Gallardo LP560 GT3	Lamborghini 5.2L V10	1–10
(United Kingdom) Tech 9 Motorsport	9	(United Kingdom) David Pinkney	GT3	Lamborghini Gallardo LP560 GT3	Lamborghini 5.2L V10	1–2
(United Kingdom) Tech 9 Motorsport	9	(United Kingdom) Jason Templeman	GT3	Lamborghini Gallardo LP560 GT3	Lamborghini 5.2L V10	3-6
(United Kingdom) Tech 9 Motorsport	9	(United Kingdom) Jonathan Cocker	GT3	Lamborghini Gallardo LP560 GT3	Lamborghini 5.2L V10	7-8
(United Kingdom) Tech 9 Motorsport	9	(United Kingdom) Tom Ferrier	GT3	Lamborghini Gallardo LP560 GT3	Lamborghini 5.2L V10	13-14
(United Kingdom) Tech 9 Motorsport	9	(Russia) Leo Machitski	GT3	Lamborghini Gallardo LP560 GT3	Lamborghini 5.2L V10	1–8, 13
(United Kingdom) Tech 9 Motorsport	9	(United Kingdom) Oliver Morley	GT3	Lamborghini Gallardo LP560 GT3	Lamborghini 5.2L V10	14
(Hong Kong) Team Modena	11	(United Kingdom) Ben de Zille Butler	GT3	Lamborghini Gallardo LP560 GT3	Lamborghini 5.2L V10	5-14
(Hong Kong) Team Modena	11	(United Kingdom) Guy Harrington	GT3	Lamborghini Gallardo LP560 GT3	Lamborghini 5.2L V10	5-14
(Hong Kong) Team Modena	21	(United Kingdom) Piers Johnson	GT3	Lamborghini Gallardo LP560 GT3	Lamborghini 5.2L V10	1-2, 5-13
(Hong Kong) Team Modena	21	(United Kingdom) Adam Jones	GT3	Lamborghini Gallardo LP560 GT3	Lamborghini 5.2L V10	1-2, 5-10
(Hong Kong) Team Modena	21	(United Kingdom) Rachel Green	GT3	Lamborghini Gallardo LP560 GT3	Lamborghini 5.2L V10	11-13
(Hong Kong) Team Modena	21	(United Kingdom) Ben de Zille Butler	GT3	Lamborghini Gallardo LP560 GT3	Lamborghini 5.2L V10	3-4
(Hong Kong) Team Modena	21	(United Kingdom) Guy Harrington	GT3	Lamborghini Gallardo LP560 GT3	Lamborghini 5.2L V10	3-4
(United Kingdom) VRS Motor Finance	12	(United Kingdom) Phil Burton	GT3	Ferrari F430 GT3	Ferrari 4.3L V8	All
(United Kingdom) VRS Motor Finance	12	(United Kingdom) Adam Wilcox	GT3	Ferrari F430 GT3	Ferrari 4.3L V8	All
(United Kingdom) CR Scuderia	14	(United Kingdom) Michael Meadows	GT3	Ferrari F430 GT3	Ferrari 4.3L V8	All
(United Kingdom) CR Scuderia	14	(United Kingdom) James Sutton	GT3	Ferrari F430 GT3	Ferrari 4.3L V8	All
(United Kingdom) CR Scuderia	15	(Republic of Ireland) Paddy Shovlin	GT3	Ferrari F430 GT3	Ferrari 4.3L V8	1-6, 9-14
(United Kingdom) CR Scuderia	15	(Italy) Marco Mapelli	GT3	Ferrari F430 GT3	Ferrari 4.3L V8	7-8
(United Kingdom) CR Scuderia	15	(Republic of Ireland) Michael Cullen	GT3	Ferrari F430 GT3	Ferrari 4.3L V8	All
(United Kingdom) CR Scuderia	16	(United Kingdom) Jeremy Metcalfe	GT3	Ferrari F430 GT3	Ferrari 4.3L V8	All
(United Kingdom) CR Scuderia	16	(United Kingdom) Luke Hines	GT3	Ferrari F430 GT3	Ferrari 4.3L V8	All
(United Kingdom) Moore Racing	17	(United Kingdom) Mike Gardiner	GT3	Dodge Viper Competition Coupe	Dodge 8.3L V10	9-10
(United Kingdom) Moore Racing	17	(United Kingdom) Alex Mortimer	GT3	Dodge Viper Competition Coupe	Dodge 8.3L V10	9-10
(United Kingdom) Cadena Motorsport	18	(United Kingdom) Barrie Whight	GT3	Aston Martin DBRS9	Aston Martin 6.0L V12	1-2, 7-12
(United Kingdom) Cadena Motorsport	18	(United Kingdom) Andy Jenkinson	GT3	Aston Martin DBRS9	Aston Martin 6.0L V12	13
(United Kingdom) Cadena Motorsport	18	(United Kingdom) Gavan Kershaw	GT3	Aston Martin DBRS9	Aston Martin 6.0L V12	1-2, 7-13
(United Kingdom) ABG Motorsport	20	(United Kingdom) Craig Wilkins	GT3	Dodge Viper Competition Coupe	Dodge 8.3L V10	All
(United Kingdom) ABG Motorsport	20	(United Kingdom) Aaron Scott	GT3	Dodge Viper Competition Coupe	Dodge 8.3L V10	All
(United Kingdom) Team Preci-Spark	22	(United Kingdom) David Jones	GT3	Ascari KZ1-R	BMW M62 5.0L V8	1-6, 13-14
(United Kingdom) Team Preci-Spark	22	(United Kingdom) Godfrey Jones	GT3	Ascari KZ1-R	BMW M62 5.0L V8	1-6, 13-14
(United Kingdom) Christians in Motorsport	23	(United Kingdom) Hector Lester	GT3	Ferrari F430 GT3	Ferrari 4.3L V8	All
(United Kingdom) Christians in Motorsport	23	(Denmark) Allan Simonsen	GT3	Ferrari F430 GT3	Ferrari 4.3L V8	1–12, 14
(United Kingdom) Christians in Motorsport	23	(United Kingdom) James Davies	GT3	Ferrari F430 GT3	Ferrari 4.3L V8	13
(United Kingdom) MTECH Racing	26	(United Kingdom) Duncan Cameron	GT3	Ferrari F430 GT3	Ferrari 4.3L V8	14
(United Kingdom) MTECH Racing	26	(United Kingdom) Nigel Greensall	GT3	Ferrari F430 GT3	Ferrari 4.3L V8	14
(United Kingdom) Team Trimite Brookspeed	40	(United Kingdom) James Gornall	GT3	Dodge Viper Competition Coupe	Dodge 8.3L V10	All
(United Kingdom) Team Trimite Brookspeed	40	(United Kingdom) Jon Barnes	GT3	Dodge Viper Competition Coupe	Dodge 8.3L V10	All
(United Kingdom) 22GT Racing	42	(United Kingdom) Tom Alexander	GT3	Aston Martin DBRS9	Aston Martin 6.0L V12	1-2, 7-10, 13-14
(United Kingdom) 22GT Racing	42	(United Kingdom) Adrian Willmott	GT3	Aston Martin DBRS9	Aston Martin 6.0L V12	3-6
(United Kingdom) 22GT Racing	42	(United Kingdom) Andy Jenkinson	GT3	Aston Martin DBRS9	Aston Martin 6.0L V12	11-12
(United Kingdom) 22GT Racing	42	(United Kingdom) Michael Bentwood	GT3	Aston Martin DBRS9	Aston Martin 6.0L V12	All
(United Kingdom) ProMotorsport	54	(United Kingdom) Derek Palmer	GT4	Nissan 350Z	Nissan VQ35HR 3.5L V6	7–14
(United Kingdom) ProMotorsport	54	(United Kingdom) Maxi Jazz	GT4	Nissan 350Z	Nissan VQ35HR 3.5L V6	9–10, 14
(United Kingdom) ProMotorsport	54	(United Kingdom) Rick Pearson	GT4	Nissan 350Z	Nissan VQ35HR 3.5L V6	13
(United Kingdom) Rob Austin Racing	55	(United Kingdom) Rob Austin	GT4	Ginetta G50	Ford Cyclone 3.5L V6	All
(United Kingdom) Rob Austin Racing	55	(United Kingdom) Hunter Abbott	GT4	Ginetta G50	Ford Cyclone 3.5L V6	All
(United Kingdom) Stark Racing	71	(United Kingdom) Ian Stinton	GT4	Ginetta G50	Ford Cyclone 3.5L V6	All
(United Kingdom) Stark Racing	71	(United Kingdom) Neil Clark	GT4	Ginetta G50	Ford Cyclone 3.5L V6	1–12
(United Kingdom) Stark Racing	71	(United Kingdom) Paul Marsh	GT4	Ginetta G50	Ford Cyclone 3.5L V6	13-14
(Belgium) IMS Motorsport	88	(United Kingdom) Matt Nicoll-Jones	GT4	Ginetta G50	Ford Cyclone 3.5L V6	All
(Belgium) IMS Motorsport	88	(United Kingdom) Stewart Linn	GT4	Ginetta G50	Ford Cyclone 3.5L V6	All
(United Kingdom) Beechdean Motorsport	99	(United Kingdom) Andrew Howard	GT4	Aston Martin V8 Vantage N24	Aston Martin 4.3L V8	1–8
(United Kingdom) Beechdean Motorsport	99	(United Kingdom) Jamie Smyth	GT4	Aston Martin V8 Vantage N24	Aston Martin 4.3L V8	1–8
(United Kingdom) Richmond Racing	101	(Sweden) Andreas Boström	Inv	Ginetta G50	Ford Cyclone 3.5L V6	14
(United Kingdom) Richmond Racing	101	(Sweden) Bjorn Gustavson	Inv	Ginetta G50	Ford Cyclone 3.5L V6	14

Icon	Class
GT3	GT3 Class
GT4	GT4 Class
Inv	Invitation Class

== Calendar ==
A provisional 14-race calendar was announced on 15 October 2007.

Round	Circuit	Date	Length	Pole position	GT3 winner	GT4 winner
1	(United Kingdom) Oulton Park	22 March	60 mins	No. 14 CR Scuderia	No. 15 CR Scuderia	No. 51 Team RPM
1	(United Kingdom) Oulton Park	22 March	60 mins	(United Kingdom) James Sutton (United Kingdom) Michael Meadows	(Republic of Ireland) Paddy Shovlin (United Kingdom) Michael Cullen	(United Kingdom) Joe Osbourne (United Kingdom) Michael Broadhurst
2	(United Kingdom) Oulton Park	24 March	60 mins	No. 23 Christians in Motorsport	No. 8 Tech 9	No. 88 IMS Motorsport
2	(United Kingdom) Oulton Park	24 March	60 mins	(United Kingdom) Hector Lester (Denmark) Allan Simonsen	(United Kingdom) Oliver Morley (United Kingdom) Tom Ferrier	(United Kingdom) Matt Nicoll-Jones (United Kingdom) Stewart Linn
3	(United Kingdom) Knockhill	12 April	60 mins	No. 16 CR Scuderia	No. 16 CR Scuderia	No. 55 Rob Austin Racing
3	(United Kingdom) Knockhill	12 April	60 mins	(United Kingdom) Jeremy Metcalfe (United Kingdom) Luke Hines	(United Kingdom) Jeremy Metcalfe (United Kingdom) Luke Hines	(United Kingdom) Hunter Abbott (United Kingdom) Rob Austin
4	(United Kingdom) Knockhill	13 April	60 mins	No. 23 Christians in Motorsport	No. 15 CR Scuderia	No. 88 IMS Motorsport
4	(United Kingdom) Knockhill	13 April	60 mins	(United Kingdom) Hector Lester (Denmark) Allan Simonsen	(Republic of Ireland) Paddy Shovlin (United Kingdom) Michael Cullen	(United Kingdom) Matt Nicoll-Jones (United Kingdom) Stewart Linn
5	(United Kingdom) Rockingham	25 May	60 mins	No. 9 Tech 9	No. 40 Team Trimite Brookspeed	No. 88 IMS Motorsport
5	(United Kingdom) Rockingham	25 May	60 mins	(United Kingdom) Jason Templeman (Russia) Leo Machitski	(United Kingdom) James Gornall (United Kingdom) Jon Barnes	(United Kingdom) Matt Nicoll-Jones (United Kingdom) Stewart Linn
6	(United Kingdom) Rockingham	26 May	60 mins	No. 9 Tech 9	No. 1 Team RPM	No. 55 Rob Austin Racing
6	(United Kingdom) Rockingham	26 May	60 mins	(United Kingdom) Jason Templeman (Russia) Leo Machitski	(United Kingdom) Paul O'Neill (United Kingdom) Steve Clark	(United Kingdom) Hunter Abbott (United Kingdom) Rob Austin
7	(United Kingdom) Snetterton	7 June	60 mins	No. 6 Matech GT Racing	No. 40 Team Trimite Brookspeed	No. 55 Rob Austin Racing
7	(United Kingdom) Snetterton	7 June	60 mins	(United Kingdom) Alex Mortimer (United Kingdom) Bradley Ellis	(United Kingdom) James Gornall (United Kingdom) Jon Barnes	(United Kingdom) Hunter Abbott (United Kingdom) Rob Austin
8	(United Kingdom) Snetterton	8 June	60 mins	No. 6 Matech GT Racing	No. 6 Matech GT Racing	No. 88 IMS Motorsport
8	(United Kingdom) Snetterton	8 June	60 mins	(United Kingdom) Alex Mortimer (United Kingdom) Bradley Ellis	(United Kingdom) Alex Mortimer (United Kingdom) Bradley Ellis	(United Kingdom) Matt Nicoll-Jones (United Kingdom) Stewart Linn
9	(United Kingdom) Thruxton	28 June	60 mins	No. 16 CR Scuderia	No. 23 Christian in Motorsport	No. 88 IMS Motorsport
9	(United Kingdom) Thruxton	28 June	60 mins	(United Kingdom) Jeremy Metcalfe (United Kingdom) Luke Hines	(United Kingdom) Hector Lester (Denmark) Allan Simonsen	(United Kingdom) Matt Nicoll-Jones (United Kingdom) Stewart Linn
10	(United Kingdom) Thruxton	29 June	60 mins	No. 42 22GT Racing	No. 40 Team Trimite Brookspeed	No. 51 Team RPM
10	(United Kingdom) Thruxton	29 June	60 mins	(United Kingdom) Tom Alexander (United Kingdom) Michael Bentwood	(United Kingdom) James Gornall (United Kingdom) Jon Barnes	(United Kingdom) Joe Osbourne (United Kingdom) Nigel Moore
11	(United Kingdom) Brands Hatch	12 July	60 mins	No. 15 CR Scuderia	No. 40 Team Trimite Brookspeed	No. 52 Team RPM
11	(United Kingdom) Brands Hatch	12 July	60 mins	(Republic of Ireland) Paddy Shovlin (United Kingdom) Michael Cullen	(United Kingdom) James Gornall (United Kingdom) Jon Barnes	(United Kingdom) Nigel Moore
12	(United Kingdom) Brands Hatch	13 July	60 mins	No. 23 Christian in Motorsport	No. 15 CR Scuderia	No. 88 IMS Motorsport
12	(United Kingdom) Brands Hatch	13 July	60 mins	(United Kingdom) Hector Lester (Denmark) Allan Simonsen	(Republic of Ireland) Paddy Shovlin (United Kingdom) Michael Cullen	(United Kingdom) Matt Nicoll-Jones (United Kingdom) Stewart Linn
13	(United Kingdom) Silverstone	17 August	120 mins	No. 20 ABG Motorsport	No. 14 CR Scuderia	No. 88 IMS Motorsport
13	(United Kingdom) Silverstone	17 August	120 mins	(United Kingdom) Craig Wilkins (United Kingdom) Aaron Scott	(United Kingdom) James Sutton (United Kingdom) Michael Meadows	(United Kingdom) Matt Nicoll-Jones (United Kingdom) Stewart Linn
14	(United Kingdom) Donington Park	12 October	120 mins	No. 23 Christian in Motorsport	No. 16 CR Scuderia	No. 88 IMS Motorsport
14	(United Kingdom) Donington Park	12 October	120 mins	(United Kingdom) Hector Lester (Denmark) Allan Simonsen	(United Kingdom) Jeremy Metcalfe (United Kingdom) Luke Hines	(United Kingdom) Matt Nicoll-Jones (United Kingdom) Stewart Linn

== Standings ==
- Competitors must have completed 70% of the race distance covered by the class winner to be classified.
- Points were awarded as follows:

1	2	3	4	5	6	7	8
10	8	6	5	4	3	2	1
Half points were awarded if a class had less than 6 cars

=== GT3 ===
Pos	Driver(s)	OUL (United Kingdom)		KNO (United Kingdom)		ROC (United Kingdom)		SNE (United Kingdom)		THR (United Kingdom)		BRH (United Kingdom)		SIL (United Kingdom)	DON (United Kingdom)	Pts
GT3 Class
1	(United Kingdom) James Gornall	21	6	2	2	1	13	1	2	3	1	1	7	Ret	8	76
1	(United Kingdom) Jon Barnes	21	6	2	2	1	13	1	2	3	1	1	7	Ret	8	76
3	(United Kingdom) Luke Hines	10	Ret	1	8	5	6	3	7	7	2	9	2	3	1	62
3	(United Kingdom) Jeremy Metcalfe	10	Ret	1	8	5	6	3	7	7	2	9	2	3	1	62
5	(United Kingdom) Michael Cullen	1	4	DSQ	1	8	16	11	4	8	4	4	1	Ret	2	60
6	(Republic of Ireland) Paddy Shovlin	1	4	DSQ	1	8	16			8	4	4	1	Ret	2	55
7	(Denmark) Allan Simonsen	3	5	15	DSQ	12	2	9	5	1	5	2	Ret		3	50
8	(United Kingdom) Hector Lester	3	5	15	DSQ	12	2	9	5	1	5	2	Ret	Ret	3	50
9	(United Kingdom) James Sutton	DNS	2	Ret	10	3	3	6	3	9	3	Ret	13	1	Ret	47
9	(United Kingdom) Michael Meadows	DNS	2	Ret	10	3	3	6	3	9	3	Ret	13	1	Ret	47
11	(United Kingdom) Craig Wilkins	9	10	3	3	7	18	15	9	2	Ret	5	3	2	Ret	40
11	(United Kingdom) Aaron Scott	9	10	3	3	7	18	15	9	2	Ret	5	3	2	Ret	40
13	(United Kingdom) Steve Clark	5	3	Ret	DSQ	Ret	1	14	10	11	Ret	3	8			27
14	(United Kingdom) Nick Foster	6	9	17	DSQ	4	4	12	8	Ret	DNS	Ret	6	4	Ret	22
15	(United Kingdom) Oliver Bryant	6	9	17	DSQ	4	4	12	8	11	Ret	3	8			21
16	(United Kingdom) Paul O'Neill	5	3	Ret	DSQ	Ret	1	14	10							20
17	(United Kingdom) Michael Bentwood	8	8	6	DSQ	6	12	Ret	12	5	8	8	4	Ret	Ret	19
18	(United Kingdom) Alex Mortimer							2	1	DNS	DNS					18
19	(United Kingdom) Bradley Ellis							2	1							18
20	(United Kingdom) Tom Ferrier	20	1	Ret	4	10	21	13	13	Ret	DNS				6	18
21	(United Kingdom) Oliver Morley	20	1	Ret	4	10	21	13	13						6	18
22	(United Kingdom) Piers Johnson	DNS	DNS			2	9	8	Ret	4	DNS	DNS	5	Ret	DNS	18
23	(United Kingdom) Peter Bamford	7	18	8	5	11	5	10	22	6	9			Ret	5	18
23	(Republic of Ireland) Matt Griffin	7	18	8	5	11	5	10	22	6	9			Ret	5	18
25	(United Kingdom) Adam Wilcox	2	Ret	DNS	DNS	Ret	Ret	5	NC	10	7	10	14	11		17
25	(United Kingdom) Phil Burton	2	Ret	DNS	DNS	Ret	Ret	5	NC	10	7	10	14	11		17
27	(United Kingdom) Adam Jones	DNS	DNS			2	9	8	Ret	4	DNS				DNS	14
28	(United Kingdom) David Ashburn	4	19	4	11	9	7									13
29	(Russia) Leo Machitski	DNS	DNS	5	DSQ	Ret	DSQ	4	6	Ret	DNS					12
30	(United Kingdom) Richard Williams	4	19	4	11											11
31	(United Kingdom) Andy Jenkinson											8	4	10		10
32	(United Kingdom) Gavan Kershaw	DNS	DNS					Ret	DNS	Ret	6	7	Ret	10		9
33	(United Kingdom) Nigel Redwood									Ret	DNS	Ret	6	4	Ret	8
34	(United Kingdom) Jonathan Cocker							4	6							8
35	(United Kingdom) Godfrey Jones	DNS	7	14	DSQ	Ret	DNS							Ret	4	7
35	(United Kingdom) David Jones	DNS	7	14	DSQ	Ret	DNS							Ret	4	7
37	(United Kingdom) Tom Alexander	8	8					Ret	12	5	8				Ret	7
38	(United Kingdom) Adrian Wilmott			6	DSQ	6	12									6
39	(United Kingdom) Barrie Whight	DNS	DNS					Ret	DNS	Ret	6	7	Ret			5
40	(United Kingdom) Ben de Zille Butler	11	17	7	Ret	Ret	17	Ret	DNS	Ret	DNS	6	Ret	Ret	Ret	5
41	(Italy) Marco Mapelli							11	4							5
42	(United Kingdom) Guy Harrington	11	17	7	Ret	Ret	17	Ret	DNS	Ret	DNS	6	Ret	Ret	Ret	5
43	(United Kingdom) Jason Templeman	20	11	5	DSQ	Ret	DSQ									4
44	(United Kingdom) Rachel Green											DNS	5	Ret		4
45	(United Kingdom) Anthony Reid					15	8	7	11							3
45	(United Kingdom) Richard Marsh					15	8	7	11							3
47	(United Kingdom) Nigel Greensall														7	2
48	(United Kingdom) Tim Harvey					9	7									2
49	(United Kingdom) Duncan Cameron														7	2
50	(United Kingdom) Steve Tandy														10	0
50	(United Kingdom) Richard Evans														10	0
51	(United Kingdom) Clint Bardwell	20	11													0
	(United Kingdom) Henry Fletcher														Ret	0
	(United Kingdom) Phil Keen														Ret	0
	(United Kingdom) James Davies													Ret		0
	(United Kingdom) David Pinkney	DNS	DNS													0
	(United Kingdom) Mike Gardiner									DNS	DNS					0
Pos	Driver(s)	OUL (United Kingdom)		KNO (United Kingdom)		ROC (United Kingdom)		SNE (United Kingdom)		THR (United Kingdom)		BRH (United Kingdom)		SIL (United Kingdom)	DON (United Kingdom)	Pts

Colour	Result
Gold	Winner
Silver	Second place
Bronze	Third place
Green	Points classification
Blue	Non-points classification
Blue	Non-classified finish (NC)
Purple	Retired, not classified (Ret)
Red	Did not qualify (DNQ)
Red	Did not pre-qualify (DNPQ)
Black	Disqualified (DSQ)
White	Did not start (DNS)
White	Withdrew (WD)
White	Race cancelled (C)
Blank	Did not practice (DNP)
Blank	Did not arrive (DNA)
Blank	Excluded (EX)

=== GT4 ===
Pos	Driver(s)	OUL (United Kingdom)		KNO (United Kingdom)		ROC (United Kingdom)		SNE (United Kingdom)		THR (United Kingdom)		BRA (United Kingdom)		SIL (United Kingdom)	DON (United Kingdom)	Pts
GT4 Class
1	(United Kingdom) Stewart Linn	13	12	10	6	13	11	18	14	12	11	13	9	5	9	124
1	(United Kingdom) Matt Nicoll-Jones	13	12	10	6	13	11	18	14	12	11	13	9	5	9	124
3	(United Kingdom) Rob Austin	DNS	DNS	9	Ret	14	10	16	15	14	DSQ	12	11	7	11	80
3	(United Kingdom) Hunter Abbott	DNS	DNS	9	Ret	14	10	16	15	14	DSQ	12	11	7	11	80
5	(United Kingdom) Joe Osborne	12	Ret	Ret	Ret	16	14	22	16	Ret	10	14	10	6	Ret	61
6	(Italy) Fulvio Mussi	14	13	11	7	16	14	17	17	13	DNS					61
7	(United Kingdom) Phil Bailey	18	16	13	9	17	15	20	20	16	12	15	12	9	Ret	56
8	(United Kingdom) Steve Tandy	18	16	13	9			20	20	16	12	15	12	9		46
9	(United Kingdom) Ian Stinton	16	17	16	12	DNS	20	19	21	15	13	16	Ret	8	Ret	42
10	(United Kingdom) Nigel Redwood			11	7	19	19	17	17							40
11	(United Kingdom) Nigel Moore							22	16	Ret	10	11	15	Ret	12	38
12	(United Kingdom) Neil Clark	16	17	16	12	DNS	20	19	21	15	13	16	Ret			37
13	(United Kingdom) Jamie Smyth	15	14	12	DSQ	18	DNS	23	18							25
13	(United Kingdom) Andrew Howard	15	14	12	DSQ	18	DNS	23	18							25
15	(United Kingdom) Richard Evans					17	15					14	10	6		21
16	(United Kingdom) Charles Hollings	14	13													14
17	(United Kingdom) Michael Broadhurst	12	Ret													10
18	(United Kingdom) Derek Palmer							21	19	DNS	14	Ret	DNS	Ret	Ret	10
19	(United Kingdom) Bradley Ellis									13	DNS				Ret	8
20	(United Kingdom) Mark Thomas	19	15													7
20	(United Kingdom) Peter Snowdon	19	15													7
22	(United Kingdom) Jamie Robinson														12	6
23	(United Kingdom) Paul Marsh													8	Ret	5
24	(United Kingdom) Colin Willmott					19	19									4
25	(United Kingdom) Maxi Jazz									DNS	14				Ret	4
26	(Sweden) Andreas Boström														13	0
26	(Sweden) Bjorn Gustavson														13	0
	(United Kingdom) Rick Pearson													Ret		0
	(United Kingdom) Tom Kimber-Smith													Ret		0
	(United Kingdom) Alex Mortimer			Ret	Ret										Ret	0
Pos	Driver(s)	OUL (United Kingdom)		KNO (United Kingdom)		ROC (United Kingdom)		SNE (United Kingdom)		THR (United Kingdom)		BRH (United Kingdom)		SIL (United Kingdom)	DON (United Kingdom)	Pts

Colour	Result
Gold	Winner
Silver	Second place
Bronze	Third place
Green	Points classification
Blue	Non-points classification
Blue	Non-classified finish (NC)
Purple	Retired, not classified (Ret)
Red	Did not qualify (DNQ)
Red	Did not pre-qualify (DNPQ)
Black	Disqualified (DSQ)
White	Did not start (DNS)
White	Withdrew (WD)
White	Race cancelled (C)
Blank	Did not practice (DNP)
Blank	Did not arrive (DNA)
Blank	Excluded (EX)
