= Kitbag =

United Kingdom sports retailer

Kitbag Ltd.
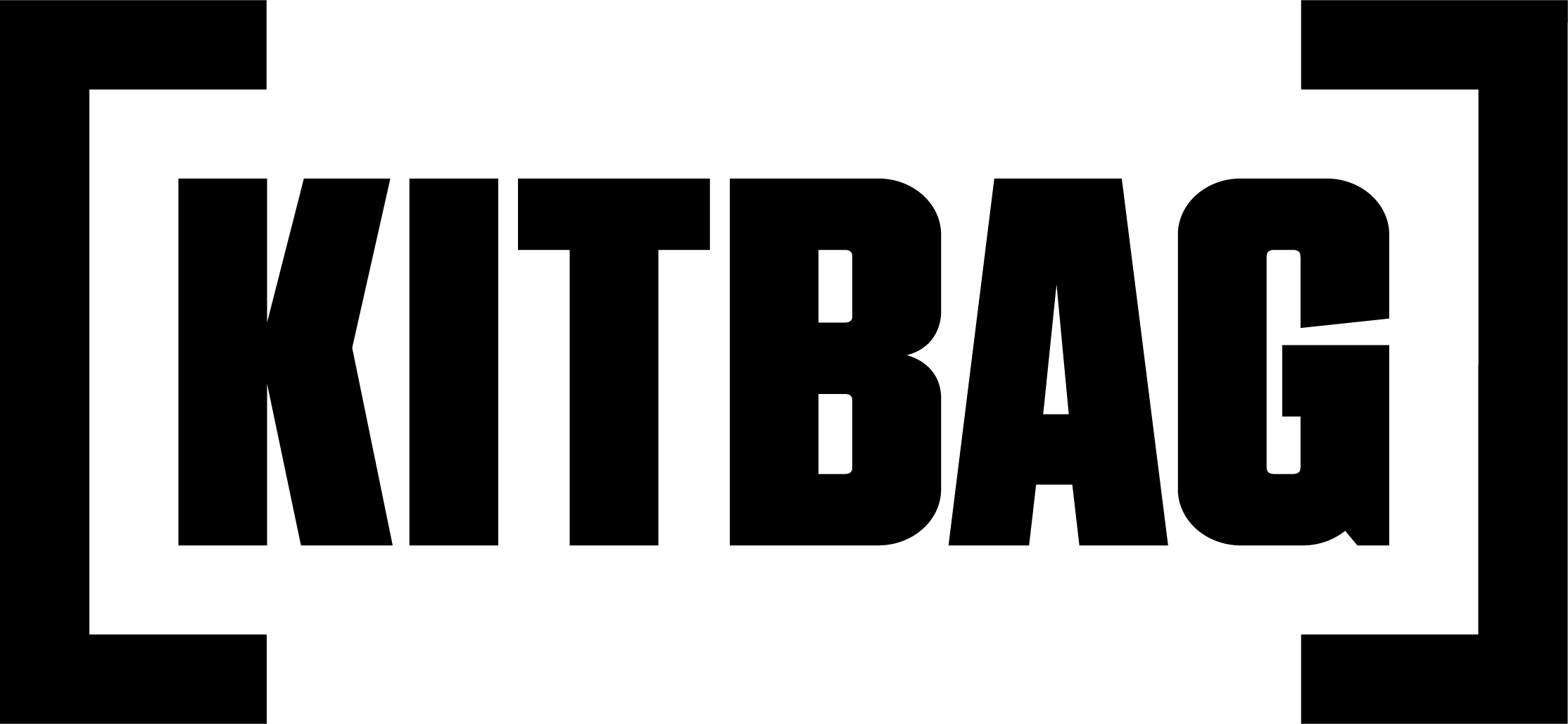
- Company type: Retail e-Commerce
- Industry: Retail
- Founded: 1999
- Headquarters: Ancoats, Manchester, England
- Area served: Global
- Key people: Steve Davies
- Products: Clothing; Sportswear
- Owner: Fanatics, Inc.
- Number of employees: ~500

Kitbag Ltd. is an English sports retailer.

The company was purchased by Fanatics, Inc. from Findel PLC in February 2016 for £11.5M, previously the company was purchased by Findel PLC in October 2006 from European Home Retail plc.

== Stores ==
Kitbag Limited (Now Fanatics International) has the rights to operate the official online stores of Manchester United, Real Madrid, Paris Saint-Germain, Atletico de Madrid, Everton, Celtic, Aston Villa, Manchester City, Borussia Dortmund, England Rugby, Valencia, Le Tour, Wimbledon, NBA, NFL, NHL, MLB, McLaren Motorsports, Formula 1, Leicester Tigers, Team GB, The Open Golf and European Tour.

In addition to these online and retail stores, Fanatics International also provides online and offline direct mailings/catalogues, call centre operations, and pick pack and dispatch parcel distribution and warehousing for their partners.

It has also had experience in running the official internet retail sites for other partners, such as Nike, Reebok, Umbro, FIFA and UEFA through merchandise agreements.

Fanatics International runs its own online sports store with over 50,000 sports products. The site is a licensed reseller of football shirts, football boots and other sports apparel and equipment.
