= Bob Johnson (butcher) =

English businessman in the meat industry (1940–2001)

Robert Alan Johnson (24 September 1940 – 10 August 2001) was a British butcher and businessman in the meat industry. He was chairman of Farepak.

== Early life ==
Johnson was born in St Giles's Hospital in Camberwell, England, United Kingdom, the youngest child and only son of Bert Johnson and his wife Lily (née Good). His father worked as a clerk at a meat depot. He and his mother were evacuated to Torbay during the Blitz. His father stayed in London to work, and his parents later separated and were divorced in 1948.

Johnson was educated in Devon. He converted to Roman Catholicism aged 12, and studied at a Catholic boarding school, St Mary's, at Clyst St Mary in Devon.

== Business career ==
Johnson left school aged 18 with no formal qualifications, and went to work in Rooksby's butcher's shops in Peckham, owned by John Manson Ltd. Together with William Knapman and another partner, his father was co-owner of Manson, a chain of around 110 butcher's shops based in and around south London. Despite being the son of one of the company's owners, he was shown no favouritism, and left after 3 years to study theology and philosophy with the White Fathers in Ireland with thoughts of becoming a missionary. After 2 years in Ireland, Johnson became a novice in England and then spent a year in France, but he left the Order aged 26 before taking vows of poverty, chastity, and obedience.

Johnson returned to John Manson Ltd in 1966, becoming a trainee meat buyer at Smithfield Market, and then becoming the manager of the company's butcher's shop on the Kings Road. Shortly afterwards, Johnson took charge of the company's new acquisition, the Farepak hamper business, which operated through local agents offering hampers through a Christmas saving club. The company was able to secure an increasing market share due to the decline of high street butchers. The butchers were facing stiff competition for their regular trade from the expanding supermarkets, but the supermarkets did not enter the hamper business. The Farepak operations moved to Swindon in 1979.

Johnson became managing director of Mansons in 1980. He wanted the company to move away from high street butchery and to concentrate on selling mail order hampers, but his father and the other directors did not agree. The dispute was resolved in 1984 by Farepak demerging from Mansons. Johnson left with the demerged Farepak and grew the business rapidly, but the rump of Manson's butcher's business stagnated under Knapman's control.

Farepak expanded its mail-order hamper business to include frozen food, drinks, Christmas gifts, and shopping vouchers. The company became a plc in 1989, and was listed on the London Stock Exchange in 1993, with an annual turnover exceeding £30 million. Farepak acquired Kleeneze in 1995, adding door-to-door sales of household cleaning products to the mail-order hamper business. Farepak was renamed as Kleeneze plc in 1999. By 2001, the group had an annual turnover of over £200 million with a market capitalisation exceeding £85 million. Johnson and his family continued to hold over half of its shares.

== Philanthropy ==
In later life, Johnson spent time on philanthropic activities. He funded expeditions to Malawi, Ghana and Indonesia by orthopaedic surgeon Hein Raat, and became a funder and trustee of the Impact Foundation which operates hospitals in Africa, India and Bangladesh. He also funded a Chair of European Thought at Oxford University in 1997, and donated money to the Refugee Studies Centre in Oxford which studies forced migration. Johnson was also a member of the Worshipful Company of Butchers, and a freeman of the City of London.

Johnson was a director of (and investor in) Prospect magazine, sponsored Garsington Opera, collected works of art, and advised the Ashmolean Museum and Bodleian Library.

== Personal life ==
Johnson married Bruna Gilodi, a native of Italy, in 1971. They had two children. Johnson died of a heart attack on 10 August 2001, while on holiday at Olbia in Sardinia.
