= European Home Retail =

British multi-level marketing company

- Formerly: Farepak Hampers (1935–1995); Kleeneze plc (1995–2006)
- Industry: Retail
- Founded: 1935; 91 years ago
- Founder: Bob Johnson
- Defunct: October 13, 2006
- Fate: Went into administration
- Headquarters: Warmley, Bristol, United Kingdom
- Subsidiaries: Farepak (went into administration with EHR); Kleeneze Europe (until 2006; sold to Findel); IWantOneOfThose.com (until 2006; sold to Findel); Kitbag.com (until 2006; sold to Findel)

European Home Retail plc (EHR) was a listed UK company, operating in home retail. Though registered in Swindon, Wiltshire, its head office was based in Warmley, Bristol. On 13 October 2006, it was announced EHR and its subsidiary Farepak had gone into administration.

== History ==
The origins of Farepak Hampers date back to 1935. In 1969, Bob Johnson was appointed managing director of the small Christmas club with 500 agents operating from a butcher's shop in Peckham.

In 1995 Farepak purchased the older Kleeneze Homecare business from Arcadia Group plc, and changed its name to Kleeneze plc, transferring its original business to a subsidiary Farepak Food and Gifts Ltd. By 2006 Kleeneze plc changed its name once more to European Home Retail plc.

== Farepak collapse ==
After a series of profit warnings starting in June 2006, Farepak ceased trading on 13 October 2006, leaving tens of thousands of people out of pocket for Christmas 2006. EHR itself went into administration later that day. The administrators explained that Farepak's collapse was triggered by the fact £33m it lent to its parent company EHR was not paid back.

It emerged during the Insolvency Service hearing that the money paid to Farepak by shoppers saving for Christmas was largely not held in trust and was generally available for the use of Farepak and its parent company, but held under the security net of HBOS, the group's bank. At various points the directors had tried to place these funds into trust, but the bank refused these proposals. It has also been established that the company was not insolvent at the time its customers paid money to it.

A fund was set up to help families affected by the Farepak closure. Donations have been made by companies including Tesco, BSkyB, Sainsbury's and Marks and Spencer. HBOS also made a donation, raising criticism that it could have given much more help by extending EHR's debt. The fund was officially closed on 29 November 2006. In December 2006, Myleene Klass used eBay to auction off the bikini which she wore during her appearance on TV show I'm a Celebrity... Get Me Out of Here!, raising £7,000 for the Farepak victims.

As a knock-on effect Amtrak, the group's main delivery agent, went into administration early in 2007.

Farepak moved from administration to liquidation on 4 October 2007.

The Insolvency Service brought disqualification proceedings against Farepak's directors. Two of the directors, Joanne Ponting and Stephen Hicks, gave undertakings to the Insolvency Service to settle the claims. The remaining directors defended them. In June 2012 the disqualification proceedings were withdrawn by the Insolvency Service after it emerged that "not only did the directors do nothing wrong, they made genuine strenuous efforts to save the group and the depositors" and the cause of the losses to Farepak's customers was the behaviour of its bank, HBOS. Mr Justice Peter Smith, the trial judge, made a statement after the case collapsed in order to explain the reasons. Ponting and Hicks are to be released from their undertakings. The trial judge also criticised the Secretary of State for its unfair approach towards the directors and witnesses.

== Board of directors ==
- Chairman: Sir Clive Thompson (formerly of Rentokil)
- William Rollason - chief executive officer (CEO)
- Stevan Fowler - Finance Director and Company Secretary (appointed 1 January 2006)
- Nicholas Gilodi-Johnson - Non-Executive Director
- Neil Gillis - Independent Non-executive Director
- Paul Munn - Independent Non-executive Director
- Michael Johns - Independent Non-executive Director appointed 28 September 2005)

Nicholas Gilodi-Johnson was appointed after the death of his father Bob Johnson.

== Subsidiary companies ==
EHR was the parent company for a number of well-known subsidiary companies, namely:

=== Kleeneze Europe ===
Kleeneze was sold on 13 October 2006 to Findel plc.

=== eeZee TV ===
In March 2005, EHR formed the joint venture satellite TV station "eeZee TV", a 50/50 joint venture with JML Direct, broadcasting on Sky digital channel 657.

=== Farepak Food & Gifts Limited ===
Farepak had been operating since 1981 at a site in Swindon, Wiltshire. Its own annual turnover of £70m (2004), was mainly generated from its core business in Christmas hampers. In addition, Farepak sold High Street (and other) gift vouchers and also supplied gifts, including electricals. Unlike many of the other subsidiary companies, Farepak was not sold to the Findel group. There was a five-hour protest outside the company's gates on 17 October 2006.

=== I Want One Of Those.com ===
Gifts and gadgets website. Now sold to the Findel group.

=== Kitbag.com ===
Europe's largest online sports retailer. Now sold to the Findel group.

== Stock market ==
European Home Retail plc was listed on the stock exchange under ticker code EHR.L. 2005 group turnover was £176.2m.

== See also ==
- Administrative receivership
- Bankruptcy
- Corporate scandal
- Creditor
- UK Department of Trade and Industry
- Liquidation
- Ring fence
