= Salesforce Tower (Atlanta) =

Office building in Atlanta, Georgia, U.S.

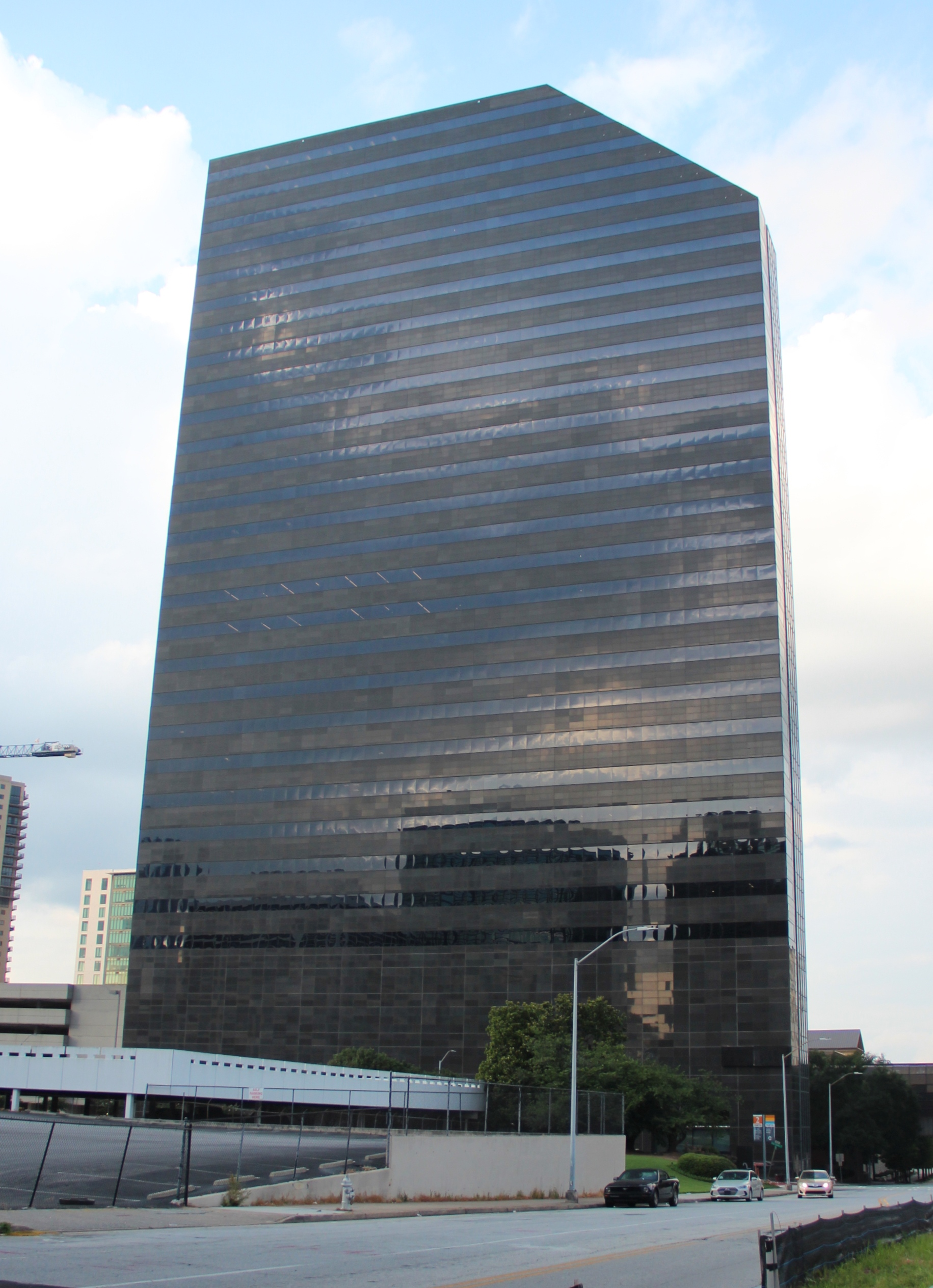
- Salesforce Tower in 2018
- Interactive map of the Salesforce Tower area

General information
- Type: Office
- Location: 950 East Paces Ferry Road NE, Atlanta, Georgia
- Coordinates: 33.8466°N 84.3571°W
- Current tenants: Salesforce (Pardot), RentGroup, The Roth Firm, Rubicon Global
- Completed: 1986
- Renovated: 2018
- Cost: $137.5 million
- Owner: Banyan Street Capital & Oaktree Capital Management

Height
- Roof: 425 ft (130 m)

Technical details
- Floor count: 34

Website
- salesforcetoweratl.com

Salesforce Tower (formerly known as Atlanta Plaza) is a 425 ft (130m) tall skyscraper in Atlanta, Georgia. It was completed in 1986 and has 34 floors. Smallwood, Reynolds, Stewart, Stewart & Associates, Inc. designed the building, which is tied with 1100 Peachtree as the 25th tallest building in Atlanta. A second tower with the same profile, but boasting ten additional floors, and a four-hundred-room hotel were originally planned for the surrounding site but never built.

== History ==
Construction began in March 1984. The building was constructed as a joint venture by Vantage Properties of Dallas and Travelers Insurance. In 1988, Sumitomo Life Realty acquired the building. In 1999, the building was purchased from Sumitomo Life Realty by a public pension fund.

In August 2017, Banyan Street Capital, partnered with architectural firm Perkins+Will, revealed their plans to improve the building. The project included entry and lobby remodel, the addition of new amenities and outdoor spaces, corridors upgrade, and the expansion of conference facilities. The renovation was completed in October 2018.

In October 2018, Salesforce.com announced plans to expand their office in the tower and to rename the building to include the company's name. In March 2019, Atlanta Business Chronicle reported that the office was expanded and the tower was renamed as Salesforce Atlanta Plaza.

== Tenants ==
The office occupants include RentGroup, Rubicon Technologies, SAS Institute, Ademco, Soltech, iFOLIO, and Carat.

== See also ==
- List of tallest buildings in Atlanta
