= Amtrak (disambiguation) =

Amtrak, the national passenger railroad company of the United States

Amtrak may also refer to:

- Amtrak California, the brand name given to state-sponsored Amtrak routes in California
- Amtrak Express, Amtrak's freight and shipping service
- Amtrak Express Parcels, a former British parcel delivery company
- Landing Vehicle Tracked, known as amtrak and amtrac

== See also ==
- The Amtrak Wars, a 1983–1990 novel series by Patrick Tilley
- Amtrac (musician) (Caleb Cornett, born 1987), an American DJ, producer and songwriter
- Agat World War II Amtrac, a submerged relic off Guam
