= Cobra Group =

Cobra Group may refer to:

- Cobra Group (infrastructure company), a spain infrastructure company
- Cobra Group (company), a direct-sales company
- COBRA (avant-garde movement), an art movement also known as Cobra group
