= Clive Thompson =

Clive Thompson may refer to:

- Clive Thompson (businessman) (born 1943), Deputy Chairman of Strategic Equity Capital
- Clive Thompson (journalist) (born 1968), Canadian freelance journalist, blogger and science and technology writer
