= ChoicesUK =

UK media rental shop chain

- Company type: Public company
- Industry: Home video
- Founded: 1985
- Defunct: 2007
- Fate: Closed 2007
- Headquarters: Peterborough, Cambridgeshire, United Kingdom
- Products: Retailing and renting of DVD, VHS, and Video Games
- Website: www.choicesuk.com

ChoicesUK was a British chain of DVD and video game rental shops across the United Kingdom. The company was the second largest video rental shop chain in the UK before its closure in 2007.

It was a multi-channel distributor and retailer of DVDs, computer games and CDs. The company was listed on the Alternative Investment Market (AIM) in London.

== History ==
=== Foundation and early years ===
ChoicesUK, formerly Home Entertainment Corporation (HEC), was established in 1985. In this pre-internet period, the company's main strategy was to exploit the UK video market.

Initially, the business was centred on video rental through its "Video Box Office" stores (now ChoicesUK Local) which supplied white-label goods to third party convenience stores. The company's first B2C store opened in 1986, under the name of "Choices Video", offering a selection of videos for rental and various confectionery products. In 1991, the company added a mail order service for the sale (not rental) of videos, and later DVDs.

ChoicesUK's pre-internet strategy focused on three areas: video and DVD rental through "Choices Video" stores, supplying third-party outlets with white-label videos and DVDs, and a catalogue-based mail order service for videos and DVDs.

These three areas saturated the pre-internet marketplace, making ChoicesUK a highly competitive organisation to challenge the market leader Blockbuster Ltd.

=== Impact of the internet ===
From 1991 to 2003 ChoicesUK experienced a period of relative continuity, where the established strategy remained largely unchanged, with the exception of minor incremental changes. This was followed by a period of industry flux, in response to the quick emergence of virtual rental companies and Video On Demand (VOD) services such as Sky Box Office.

In response to the threat from the Internet, ChoicesUK decided to re-brand its divisions under this name and focus upon a single brand strategy to encompass all company activities. This aimed to improve brand awareness and increase the overall industry presence in the UK's home entertainment retail and distribution market.

After this rebranding strategy, ChoicesUK had 3 divisions:

- ChoicesUK stores - had 180 outlets located throughout the UK, catering for impulse rentals of DVDs, games and music
- ChoicesUK Local - supplied third-party outlets with white-label DVDs.
- ChoicesUK Direct - incorporated the catalogue mail-order service, and transferred this service to an on-line mail order service, through the ChoicesUK website

ChoicesUK chose to circumvent the DVD-by-mail market, and instead focused upon its physical base of stores and supplying the convenience store sector with new white-label goods.

However, the success of the Internet rental process made ChoicesUK recognise the strategic significance of modern data management systems. This led to various collaborations and partnerships with e-commerce specialists such as QAS plc, Snow Valley Ltd and Charteris plc.

=== Administration 2007 ===
Despite these changes, the company struggled in the changing marketplace. In April 2007, Choices UK issued a profits warning citing "unseasonably fine weather" in the four weeks to 7 April for a big downturn in movie rentals. This had a drastic effect on the value of the company, with shares plunging 50% to 22.5p, valuing the company at £4m - equal to less than two weeks' sales. Two years previous the shares were changing hands at around 200p.

Saddled with £13m of debts and creditors, the company went into administration in August 2007 after the chain failed to secure refinancing for the business. Multi-channel retailer Findel would go on to purchase the wholesale, online and mail order divisions of ChoicesUK, on behalf of its sister company Webb Group Ltd, but refused the option to acquire the firm's High Street retail operation. Administrator PricewaterhouseCoopers continued to look for a buyer of the retail business, whilst closing unprofitable stores.

On 14 September 2007, Blockbuster GB Limited bought the number of remaining retail stores from ChoicesUK Plc. The sale secured employment for approximately 450 employees across 59 stores in the UK. As part of the transaction, Blockbuster GB rebranded the stores as Blockbuster.

On 2 March 2012, The Webb Group who are the parent company of ChoicesUK went into administration as "The Companies did not have the money to pay its liabilities as and when they fell due."
