= Caleb McDuff =

British go-kart racer (born 2008)

Caleb McDuff (born 20 January 2008) is a British racing driver from Wales. He is profoundly deaf and competes using cochlear implants. McDuff is notable for becoming the first deaf driver to win a race in the Britcar Trophy Championship.

He currently races a Porsche 911 GT3.

McDuff began his racing career in the Super 1 National Kart Championships, driving for AllStars Racing Team, managed by Luke Hines. In 2022 - 2023 he raced in the Junior Saloon Car Championship, driving for Orex Competition. During 2023 McDuff was also linked with Team BRIT as he is involved in a project to develop and test equipment to allow Deaf racing drivers to communicate with pit crews whilst they are racing.

In January 2024 McDuff announced he would be racing a BMW 1 Series in the Britcar Trophy Championship, driving for Team BRIT. He progresses with Team BRIT to their BMW M240i and then on to their McLaren 570S GT4 machine.

In 2026 he announced his plans to move from Team BRIT to Porsche Carrera Cup GB as part of his climb towards BTCC.

McDuff proactively uses his platform to encourage young people, visiting schools and sharing his experiences as a deaf racing driver and speaking about overcoming barriers in sport. In an interview with the Free Press Series, he said he hopes his story will inspire others to believe that “anything is possible” and to pursue their ambitions regardless of the obstacles they face..

In July 2026, alongside his schools programme and advocacy work, McDuff established the CAL38 Community Interest Company (CIC) to support and inspire young people pursuing ambitious goals in sport and beyond. The organisation's first public project involved supporting Welsh taekwondo champion Riley Davies ahead of international competition in Croatia.

== Racing ==
From an early age McDuff showed an interest in cars and racing, and learned to drive electric-powered cars from the age of 18 months. He had his first drive of a petrol-powered go-kart at age four.

In 2014 McDuff joined the Bambino Kart Tour, a race series created by Darren Beavers to encourage children aged six to eight to enter go-kart racing. The tour takes place at seven tracks around the United Kingdom during the course of the year. McDuff raced on a zip chassis, powered by a 50cc two-stroke engine which reaches speeds in excess of 40 mph, whilst racing in Bambino class. McDuff moved to Honda powered Zip chassis for the 2018 Super One British Championship.

Whilst racing, McDuff was unable to wear the processors for his cochlear implants that allow him to hear. This means that he races in complete silence, and this inspired the team name he raced under of 'Silence Racing'. McDuff relied fully on sign language and lip reading once his processors are off, and learned to adapt other senses to compensate for this, and 'feels' the go-kart and its engine rather than hearing it.

In September 2014, McDuff received public nominations for Deaf Sports Personality of the Year (DSPY) 2014 (Young Player of the Year), and also Young Gun 2014 (under 13) by internet-based radio station DownForce UK.

In January 2018, McDuff joined the AllStars Racing team, managed by Luke Hines. Hines, a former racing driver himself, worked with McDuff to prepare him for the 2018 Super One Karting Championship.

In May 2019, McDuff became the first profoundly Deaf racing driver to step on the Super 1 National Championship podium, after finishing 2nd at Rowrah, Cumbria. At the time, McDuff was driving for the same works Zipkart Team that four time Formula One World Champion Lewis Hamilton drove for during his karting career.

In October 2019, McDuff won the Super 1 National Kart Championships, making him first ever Deaf person to do so.

in 2020 McDuff returned to the Super One Championship, racing in the faster Rotax Max class. In the opening race of the Championship he was involved in a serious collision, causing him to have a dislocated shoulder and rib injuries. Despite missing a number of races whilst recovering, he still finished 3rd in the championship. In doing so, he also became the first ever Deaf driver to win a Super One Championship race.

Later in 2020 he went on to win the Super One annual 'O Plate' race in Cumbria, driving for the M-Sport racing team. Winning the O Plate was another first for a Deaf driver.

2023 McDuff moved from karting to cars, competing in the Junior Saloon Car Championship (JSCC), racing a Citroen Saxo VTR. During this era, his father, Ian McDuff, engineered a solution that allowed him to use his cochlear implants whilst racing for the first time. This allowed him to access sound whilst racing, but critically to have real time pit-to-car communication with his race engineer. This was an important step for him to be able to progress to GT/endurance racing where comms are critical.

In April 2024, McDuff made history by becoming the first Deaf driver to step on the podium at the BRITCAR Trophy Championship, taking his Team BRIT BMW 1 series to 3rd after a mechanical fault caused him to drop from 1st place lead.

Just two months later, in June 2024, McDuff became the first ever Deaf driver to win a race in the BRITCAR Trophy Championship, with teammate Bobby Trundley at Silverstone Circuit, and the first Deaf driver to win a major UK motor race.

McDuff went on to take the overall class win in the 2024 season of the BRITCAR Trophy Championship. He ended the season with a step up in class for the final race of the season, driving Team BRITs BMW m240i, with new teammate Asha Silva.

In November 2024, McDuff was again nominated for the Deaf Sports Personality of the Year awards. He won the category for Young Deaf Sports Personality of the Year (under 18). In a press release following his success, he hinted he would be racing in GT4 class of cars in 2025.

February 2025 McDuff confirmed he would be remaining with Team BRIT for the 2025 season. He will be driving the teams McLaren 570S GT4 car in the BRITCAR Endurance Championship.

November 2025 McDuff made his international racing debut, taking part in the Veterans Race of Remembrance at Virginia International Speedway, Virginia, USA. He took 3rd place overall and winning in class, in a Ford Mustang racing under Resilience Racing and Skip Barber.

January 2026 McDuff announced he would be competing in the 2026 Porsche Carrera Cup GB Championship, and set out a 3 year plan to be competing in the British Touring Car Championship (BTCC) by 2028.

== Sponsorship ==
In February 2015, British Touring Car team, WIX Racing announced McDuff as a member of their driver line up as part of a sponsorship program. UK-based oil company Millers Oils also announced their support of McDuff's career development. At the time of announcements, McDuff was the youngest deaf racing driver in the world on a professional career path.

McDuff is also sponsored by financial services comparison website Go Compare and house builders Taylor Wimpey, as well as several local businesses.

In September 2020, McDuff announced that due to the COVID-19 recession, he had lost all financial support from his sponsors.

== Communication technology and aviation ==
McDuff and his father, Ian, developed a communication system that enables radio messages to be transmitted directly to his cochlear implant processors. The technology was created to overcome the difficulties McDuff experienced hearing race engineers over conventional motorsport radio equipment and has enabled him to receive live team communications while competing.

In 2026, McDuff began exploring applications for the system outside motorsport, working with the disabled flying charity Aerobility to adapt it for aviation. Following successful simulator trials, McDuff tested the system during a flight, receiving communications directly through his cochlear implants while airborne. The trial demonstrated the technology's potential to improve radio communication for deaf and hard-of-hearing pilots and other cochlear implant users in aviation.
