= CRS Racing =

British auto racing team

(United Kingdom) CRS Racing
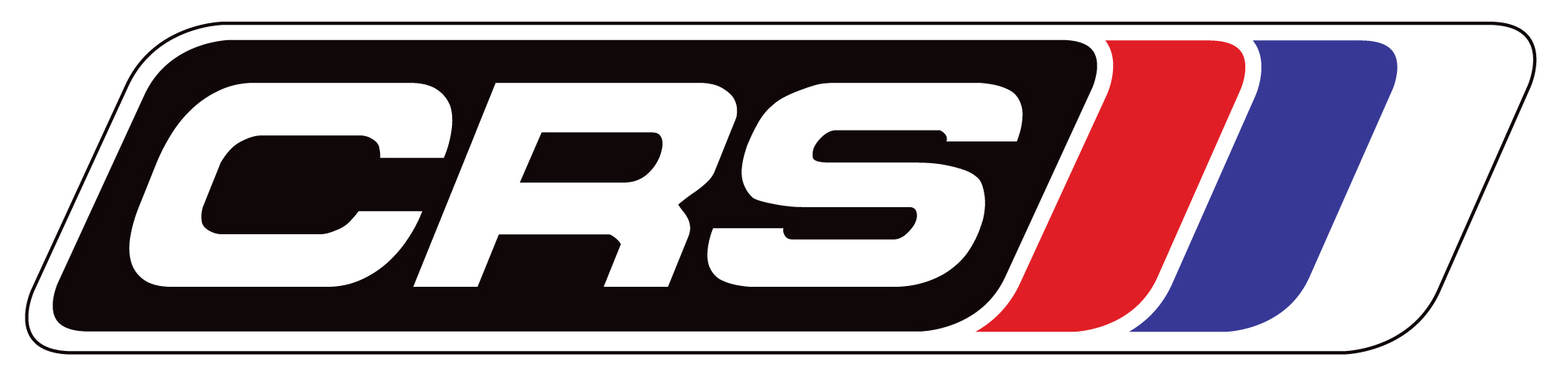
- Founded: 2004 (as Team AKA); 2007 (as CR Scuderia)
- Team principal(s): Chris Niarchos; Andrew Kirkaldy
- Former series: European Championship; GP3 Series; British Formula Renault Championship
- Teams' Championships: 2 (2008 British GT, 2011 British GT)
- Drivers' Championships: 1 (2008 British F. Renault)

CRS Racing is a British auto racing team founded by British driver Andrew Kirkaldy and Canadian-Greek driver and entrepreneur Chris Niarchos. The team was founded in 2007, but is based on the former team of Kirkaldy known as Team AKA which competed in the British Formula Renault Championship starting in 2004. Niarchos, founder of the Cobra Group, sponsored and then partnered with Kirkaldy's team before it was reformed in 2007 in order to expand beyond Formula Renault to enter the European FIA GT Championship and British GT Championship.

In 2010 CRS Racing partnered with McLaren Automotive to develop their sports car program, eventually rebranding as McLaren GT to build and maintain their customer cars. CRS Racing concentrated solely on McLaren GT after 2012.

== History ==
Andrew Kirkaldy's Team AKA debuted in the British Formula Renault championship in 2004, led by driver James Jakes, who went on to earn tenth in the Drivers Championship before leading the team to third in the series in 2005. It was however Swedish driver Alexander Storckenfeldt who earned Team AKA their first Formula Renault victory at the Thruxton Circuit. Team AKA also entered Jakes in the Formula Renault 2000 Eurocup. Jakes' third place in the British championship earned him a nomination for the McLaren Autosport BRDC Award. As Jakes and Storckenfeldt moved to other series, AKA hired Jeremy Metcalfe, Peter Rees, and Irishman Patrick Hogan. Hogan led the team with six wins and tied Sebastian Hohenthal on points but earned second in the championship by the tiebreaker. AKA also earned second place in the Teams Championship behind Fortec Motorsport.

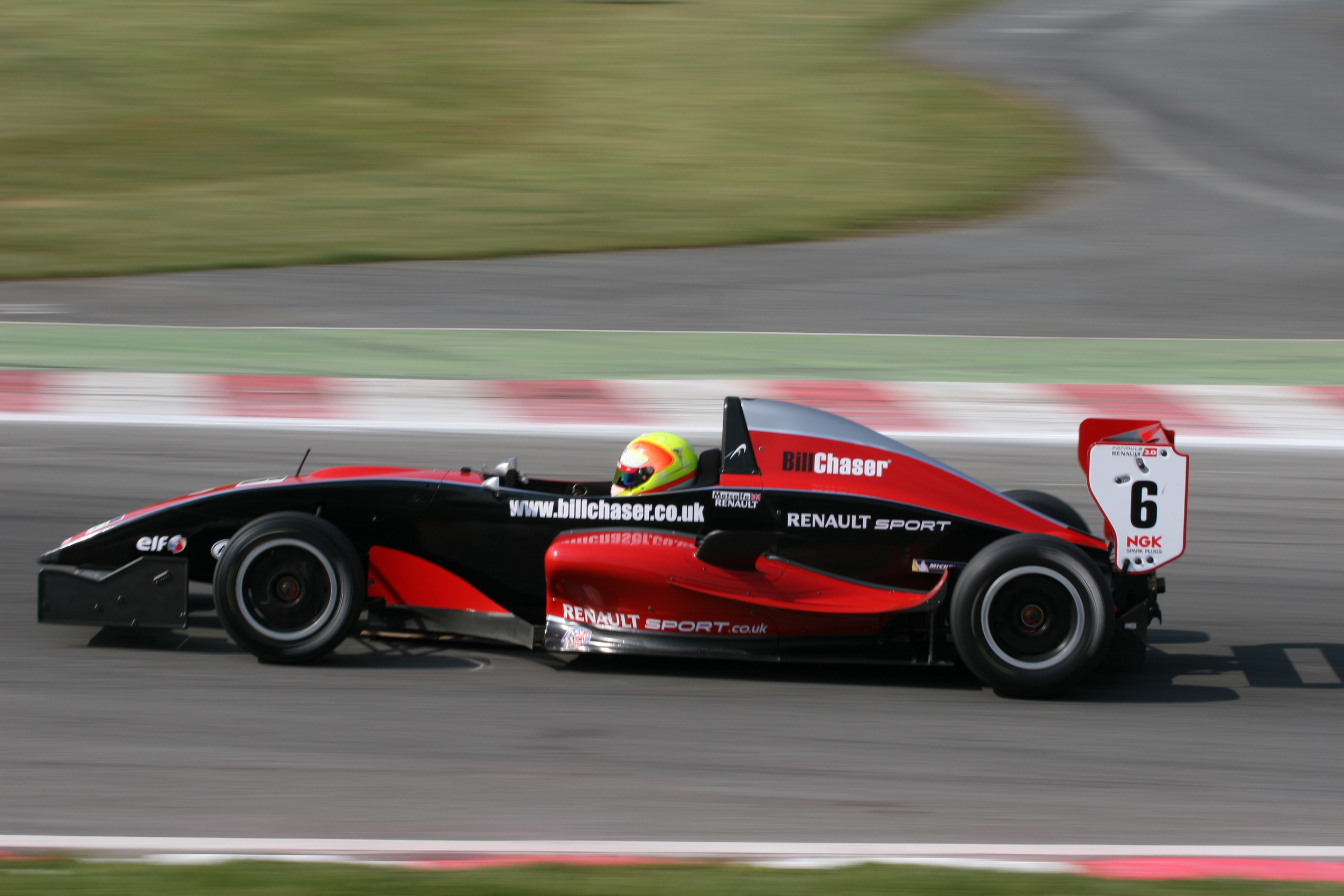
Jeremy Metcalfe driving an AKA Cobra Formula Renault car during the 2007 championship

In 2007 Chris Niarchos approached Kirkaldy with sponsoring of Team AKA in their fourth season of the British Formula Renault Championship. Niarchos and Kirkaldy had previously been teammates on the Scuderia Ecosse team which competed in the FIA GT Championship. Team AKA then became known as AKA Cobra and hired Adam Christodoulou, Chris Holmes, and Australian Nathan Caratti to drive alongside the returning Metcalfe. Christodoulou finished fourth in the championship while Metcalfe earned two wins over the season. AKA Cobra once again completed the season second in the Teams Championship, trailing Fortec.

Following the 2007 season, Niarchos' interest in the team expanded as the two wished to enter their own team in not only the FIA GT Championship but the British GT Championship as well, ending their relationship with Scuderia Ecosse. The team was renamed once more and was relaunched as CR Scuderia, reflecting their choice of Italian Ferraris for their entry into grand tourer racing. CR Scuderia employed defending multiple drivers to cover their two new series as well as their continuing efforts in Formula Renault. Defending Le Mans Series champion Rob Bell co-drove with Kirkaldy in the FIA GT Championship while Niarchos led the team's other car. Luke Hines, Jeremy Metcalfe, James Sutton, Michael Meadows, Michael Cullen, Paddy Shovlin were the full-season entrants in the trio of Ferraris for British GT. Christodoulou returned for another season of Formula Renault and was joined by Scott Jenkins, Sten Pentus, and Ryuji Yamamoto.

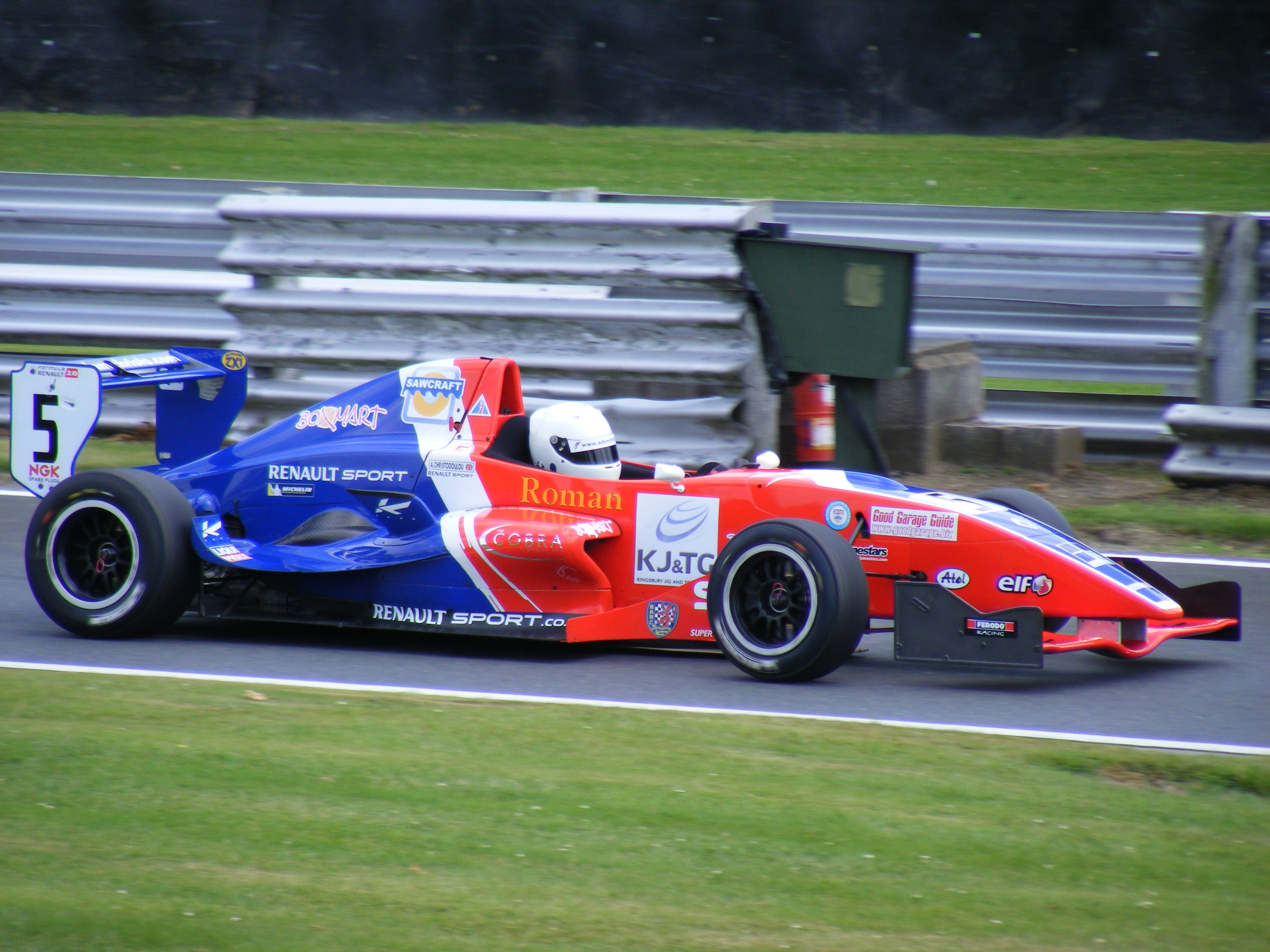
Adam Christodoulou driving for CR Scuderia during the 2008 Formula Renault UK season

The 2008 season was successful for the reformed team as they managed victories in each of their three series. Kirkaldy and Bell won both races at the Bucharest City Challenge and placed 6th in the FIA GT Championship, while all three Ferraris won races over the course of the British GT season, led by Hines and Metcalfe in second in the Drivers Championship, but also earning the team first in the Teams Championship. A second championship was earned by the team in British Formula Renault as Christodoulou won the Drivers Championship after seven victories over the season.

=== Current activities ===
Prior to the start of the 2009 season, CR Scuderia was renamed CRS Racing, but much of the team remains the same from their previous year. Kirkaldy and Bell continue in the FIA GT Championship, while Niarchos is joined full-time by Tim Mullen in the team's second Ferrari. Formula Renault entries continue for the team, but the drivers are entirely new as Harry Tincknell, Matias Laine, Joshua Scott, and Lewis Williamson compete for the title.

Although they are the defending Team Champions in British GT, CRS Racing chose to move their other Ferraris to the FIA GT3 European Championship for this season where Chris Goodwin, Klaas Hummell, Phil Quaife, and Robert Hissom will compete. CRS are also currently busy helping with the development of the GT3 racing variant of the McLaren MP4-12C. The car made its competitive debut at a British GT Championship round at Spa-Francorchamps in July 2011, running as an invitational entrant with Chris Goodwin and Andrew Kirkaldy achieving a pole position and a best result of fourth place from the two races to be held. Three MP4-12C cars contested the Spa 24 Hours in July, with only one reaching the event's end.

== Results ==
=== GP3 ===
Year	Car	Drivers	Races	Wins	Poles	Fast laps	Points	D.C.	T.C.
2010	Dallara GP3/10-Renault	(Italy) Patrick Reiterer	4	0	0	0	0	33rd	7th
2010	Dallara GP3/10-Renault	(Spain) Roberto Merhi	12	0	0	0	26	6th	7th
2010	Dallara GP3/10-Renault	(United Kingdom) Oliver Oakes	16	0	0	0	0	28th	7th
2010	Dallara GP3/10-Renault	(Italy) Vittorio Ghirelli	16	0	0	0	0	34th	7th
2011	Dallara GP3/10-Renault	(Philippines) Marlon Stöckinger	16	0	0	0	0	29th	10th
2011	Dallara GP3/10-Renault	(United Kingdom) Nick Yelloly	16	0	0	0	7	21st	10th
2011	Dallara GP3/10-Renault	(Switzerland) Zoël Amberg	16	0	0	0	0	28th	10th
2012	Dallara GP3/10-Renault	(Hungary) Tamás Pál Kiss	16	0	0	0	38	12th	8th
2012	Dallara GP3/10-Renault	(Belgium) John Wartique	10	0	0	0	0	25th	8th
2012	Dallara GP3/10-Renault	(United States) Ethan Ringel	16	0	0	0	0	29th	8th
2012	Dallara GP3/10-Renault	(Brazil) Fabio Gamberini	2	0	0	0	1	20th	8th
2012	Dallara GP3/10-Renault	(Argentina) Facu Regalia	4	0	0	0	0	27th	8th

D.C. = Drivers' Championship position, T.C. = Teams' Championship position.
