= Peter Bamford =

British businessman

Peter Richard Bamford (born 6 March 1954 in London) is an English businessman. He presently a Non-Executive Director of Rentokil-Initial plc, and until he resigned in April 2019, Chairman of Superdry pls, formally SuperGroup plc, the owner of the Superdry brand.

Bamford has held a number of Chairman and non-executive roles since leaving Vodafone in 2006 which have included Chairman of Six Degrees Technology Group and Chairman of PRS for Music Limited. He was an Executive Director of Vodafone Group plc for eight years in which period the company was transformed from a UK mobile player to one of the largest telecommunications companies in the world and a significant international brand. Bamford was Chief Executive of Vodafone UK, Regional Chief Executive for the NEMEA region and latterly also oversaw the marketing function. Before joining The Vodafone Company in 1997, Bamford was a director WH Smith PLC and managing director of the W H Smith chain and earlier in his career held senior positions with Kingfisher plc and Tesco PLC.

Bamford is also known for his motor racing activities. Since 2006 he has competed in major championships including the Ferrari Challenge, British GT Championship, Le Mans Series and International GT Open.
