= Jeremy Metcalfe =

British motor racing driver (born 1988)

- Nationality: (United Kingdom) British
- Born: 9 April 1988 (age 38) Fleet, Hampshire (UK)

Formula Renault UK career
- Debut season: 2005
- Current team: Team AKA Cobra
- Car number: 2
- Former teams: Welch Motorsport
- Starts: 49
- Wins: 2
- Poles: 1
- Fastest laps: 0
- Best finish: 5th in 2006

Jeremy Metcalfe (born 9 April 1988 in Fleet, Hampshire) is a British motor racing driver who last competed in 2008 in the British GT Championship where he finished the season as Vice-Champion along with team-mate Luke Hines. Racing in the Formula Renault UK championship prior to his move into GT, Metcalfe enjoyed a good level of success. He also had a productive career in karting, taking the Parma Industrials Karting Championship, a championship that was previously won by Scuderia Ferrari reserve driver Giancarlo Fisichella.

== Career ==
=== Karting ===
Like a majority of racing drivers, Metcalfe's career began in karting. It didn't take long for the Briton to win his first major karting title which came at the age of eight; winning the MSA British Cadet Karting Championship. The next few years would see Metcalfe move into the European stage of karting and in 2003 the youngster won his first Major European title – the Parma Industrials Karting Championship, previous won by Formula One race winner Giancarlo Fisichella. In addition to that, Melcalfe came third in the Formula A category of the British Formula ICA Championship. 2004 signalled the end of the Briton's time in karting and took third again in the Formula A category of the British Formula ICA Championship, eighth in the competitive South Garda Winter Cup and a top-six position in the Italian Formula A championship.

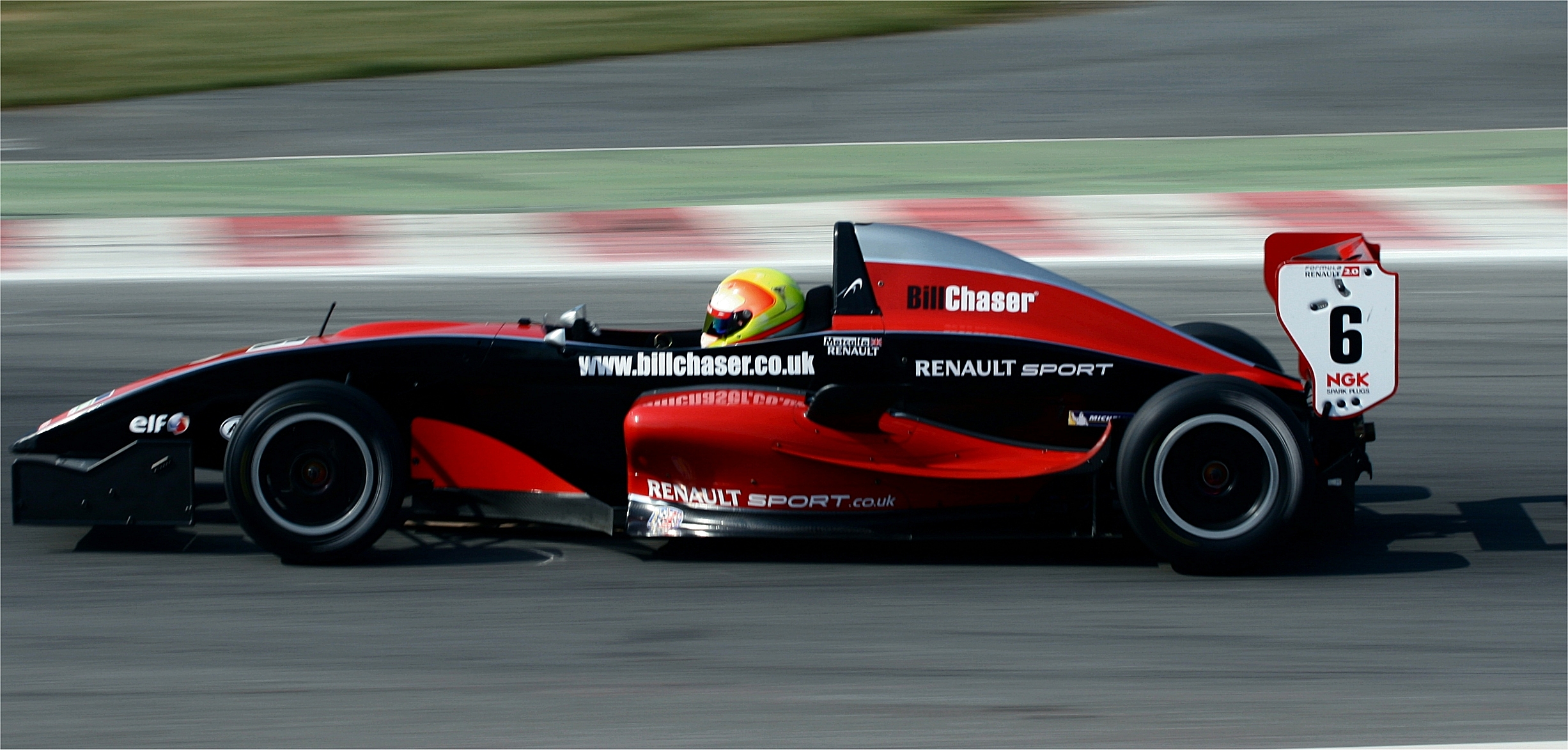
Metcalfe during qualifying for the second round at Brands Hatch of the 2007 Formula Renault UK season. He qualified seventh.

=== Formula Renault ===
In 2005, Metcalfe took the step up to single seater racing in the Formula Renault UK championship. Metcalfe started 18 races in his debut season and finished the year 24th, third in the "Graduate Cup", in what was effectively a "learning year" for him. However, during the Winter Series for the Formula Renault UK championship, Metcalfe won one of the three races pole position and finished the series in eighth.

Metcalfe made a further 20 starts in the category the following season, finishing on the podium five times. The Englishman finished the season fifth in the championship with 343 points. 2006 also saw Metcalfe nominated as one of the six finalists for the McLaren Autosport BRDC Award. The award did not go Metcalfe's way, instead the award went to Oliver Turvey.

Metcalfe's third year in Formula Renault saw some more success, taking his first win in the category.

=== Big Brother: Celebrity Hijack ===
Metcalfe took part in Big Brother: Celebrity Hijack in 2008. He survived until the final day and finished 5th with 15.6% of the final vote.

=== British GT Championship ===
In 2008, Metcalfe competed in the British GT Championship partnering Luke Hines for CR Scuderia.

== Statistics ==
=== Motor racing record ===
Season	Series	Team name	Races	Poles	Wins	Points	Final Placing
2005	Formula Renault UK	Welch Motorsport	18	0	0	37	24th
2005	Formula Renault UK; Winter Series	Team AKA	3	1	1	54	8th
2006	Formula Renault UK	Team AKA	20	0	0	343	5th
2007	Formula Renault UK	Team AKA Cobra	14	1	2	333	5th
