= Kleeneze =

Former multi-level marketing company

- Industry: Homeware
- Founded: 1923; 103 years ago in Hanham, Bristol, England
- Founder: Harry Crook
- Parent: European Home Retail (1995-2007); Findel plc (2007-2015); JRJR Networks (2015-2018); Ultimate Products (2018-present)
- Website: kleeneze.com

Kleeneze is a British homeware company operating throughout the United Kingdom providing everyday laundry and cleaning staples and appliances, to UK retailers. Founded in 1923 in Hanham, Bristol, it is now owned by Manchester-based brands house Ultimate Products, as part of their wider portfolio of homeware brands.

== History ==
The company's founder, Harry Crook, emigrated to the United States, and whilst there joined Fuller Brush as a sales representative. He returned to Bristol several years later, and started a business making brushes which were sold door-to-door by salesmen.

In 1995, Kleeneze was bought by European Home Retail (EHR). The company was bought by Findel PLC in 2007, after the collapse of EHR. In 2015, Findel sold Kleeneze to CVSL, an American holding company, as part of their MLM portfolio.

The company remained at its original Hanham site for almost 80 years. In May 2004, the company relocated its headquarters and distribution centre to Warmley. In 2007, after the acquisition by Findel, it was announced that the company would move to Hyndburn.

In 2016, funding was obtained from Greater Manchester Combined Authority for Kleeneze to set up a warehouse and distribution centre in Rochdale.

Kleeneze was a founder member of the UK's Direct Selling Association until 2017.

Kleeneze went into administration under the firm FRP Advisory on 12 April 2018. This was due to a period of rough trading and operational issues following its 2017 move to Heywood which had caused the company to seek a buyer to save the business. At the time, the company reported 140 jobs and 5,000 distributors.

In 2018, Kleeneze was purchased by Ultimate Products, a brand house for housewares and cleaning products. The brand continues to supply cleaning staples and household supplies. The brand was relaunched with a focus on floorcare and laundry products but through retail and online channels, after the previous door to door magazines sales mantra had failed to adapt to an increasing online demand from consumers.
