= Amtrak Express Parcels =

- Industry: Parcel delivery
- Founded: 1987
- Founders: Roger and Elaine Baines
- Defunct: 2012
- Fate: Bankruptcy in 2012
- Headquarters: United Kingdom

Amtrak Express Parcels was a parcel delivery company in the United Kingdom, which went bankrupt in 2012.

== History ==
It was founded in 1987 by Roger and Elaine Baines, who grew the business from a small outfit based in the West Midlands into a nationwide parcel carrier, with around 1,000 vehicles, operating out of around one hundred distribution centres.

The growth of the company in the early years was based on its focus on providing high quality deliveries and focusing on small high margin customers who valued the quality of service, as opposed to working with larger companies with bigger volumes who expected much lower prices.

From the beginning, the company undertook to deliver all their packages during the morning, and provided their customers with computer based tracking facilities (hence the name AM Trak). The company also benefited hugely from the series of strikes at Royal Mail during the end of the 1980s.

The company won a number of awards throughout the 1990s and early 2000s for its parcel delivery service over the years, most notably numerous awards from Triangle, the leading independent source of information and analysis on the global mail, express, and logistics market sectors and the related business community.

Unusually for a parcel carrier, Amtrak also transported small livestock such as valuable reptiles and birds. After finding that delivering snakes and pigeons in the same vehicle had its drawbacks, the service was withdrawn for reptiles and focused on pigeon deliveries. Amtrak were one of the first parcel delivery companies based in the United Kingdom to adopt barcoded package tracking, with all drivers being given hand held computers in 1994.

Roger Baines sold the business in the end of the 1990s, to private equity firm 3i Group Plc for around £70 million (around $120 million). This was during the era of the internet boom. The new owners decided to focus Amtrak's efforts on the internet home shopping revolution, targeting large companies such as Farepak. This business model was not without its problems as ultimately it meant suffering from the huge peaks and troughs of internet home shopping.

=== Bankruptcy ===
The company was bailed out in October 2003, with a new management team being brought in. During the following year, it posted a profit of £2 million. The company purchased its competitor Nightspeed Services Limited in August 2005. Nightspeed had gone into administration a few days before. Nightspeed services were integrated into the existing Amtrak network, and the Nightspeed brand disappeared.

Amtrak suffered a reversal in fortunes after the takeover of Nightspeed, and collapsed in January 2007. This was widely reported as being due to the collapse of Farepak, although it had been losing customers since the takeover of Nightspeed, who complained of poor service and misplaced parcels. The company was bought out of administration by Netfold Limited.

Amtrak's turnover (annual revenue) was about £80 million. It had almost 1,000 employees. The company's new chairman was Ron Series, and the new managing director was Alan Jones.

Unfortunately, it was too late to stop the decline, and Amtrak went into administration again and ceased trading on 22 August 2008. UK Mail and the Business Post Group handled existing carriage and all future business.
