= Ademco Security Group =

Singapore-based security services company

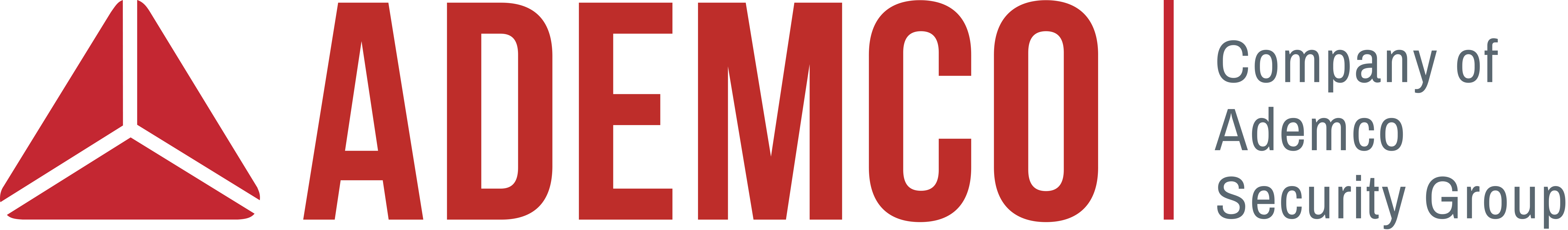
- Industry: Security technology
- Predecessor: Ademco Far East PLC
- Founded: 1977
- Headquarters: Singapore
- Area served: Southeast Asia
- Website: ademcosecurity.com

Ademco Security Group is a Singapore-based security services company that sells monitoring services, manpower security services, unified security management, and enterprise security software. The company has approximately 8000 corporate and government clients across Asia, including Singapore, Malaysia, Philippines, Indonesia, Thailand, Vietnam, India, and China's major cities.

Ademco established Singapore's first private wireless mesh network for security clients in 1998. It currently employs 400 in Singapore and its branch locations in six other countries. In 2018, it reported annual revenue of $40 million. The company also runs Singapore's fire decentralized central alarm monitoring center.

== History ==
In 1977, Ademco USA hired business executive T.C. Koh to set up a regional headquarters, Ademco Far East PLC, to expand security services in Asia, primarily fire sprinklers, alarm systems and sensors, and locks. Koh opened offices in Singapore, Malaysia, and Hong Kong.

In 1985, on a visit to a friend in the eastern United States who owned a central alarm monitoring company, Koh decided to start his own security monitoring business in Asia. At the same time, the US was suffering a recession, and Ademco USA offered to sell its Asian subsidiary directly to Koh. Koh purchased the subsidiary for $1 million, establishing the new company as Ademco (Far East) Pte Ltd. Koh set up a private alarm monitoring station enterprise for client facilities in Singapore.

In the 1980s, the company installed alarms in elevators for the Housing and Development Board (HDB) to deter local crime. It also helped the Singapore Civil Defense Force set up their fire alarm monitoring station. In the 1990s, Ademco outfitted the highway speed cameras with proximity sensors and surveillance equipment to protect highway speed cameras for the Singapore police.

In 1995, Ademco began a failed attempt to enter the Chinese market. In the same year, T.C. Koh's son, Toby Koh, joined the company after spending three years as a corporate banker. The younger Koh started at Ademco in sales, then eventually became managing director and spokesperson for the company.

In 2006, Rentokil Initial, a London Stock Exchange-listed British company bought out Ademco with plans to expand across Asia. The expansion plan was canceled with a management team turnover in 2008. In 2007, the company established an in-house development and design division. In 2010, a group of Asian businessmen bought the business back from Rentokil through a management buyout, returning control to the Koh family. A merger with a competitor in China allowed Ademco to relaunch on the mainland in 2010, opening offices in Tianjin, Beijing, Chongqing, Shanghai, and Shenzhen.

In 2009, Ademco Security Group won a Resorts World Sentosa (RWS) contract and provided the resort with integrated security management for security and business functions.

In February 2018, the company announced a 60 percent acquisition of TNT Technologies Joint Stock Company, a security provider in Vietnam.

== Services ==
Products and services include 24-hour central alarm monitoring, managed facility security services, video surveillance, digital policing, closed circuit TV (CCTV), biometric and identity management, personal contraband scanners, RFID tags, access control systems, and electronic barriers.

AES Wireless Mesh Security Network: Approved in 1998 by iDA, Singapore Police Force and Singapore Civil Defence Force, the AES private wireless network attained countrywide coverage in 1999. As of 2016, this network served more than 2,400 buildings in Singapore.

Alarm Monitoring and Intrusion Detection: Ademco built an Alarm Monitoring Station in Singapore. The Monitoring Station is also a Fire (DECAM) Monitoring provider in Singapore.

CCTV/Surveillance: Ademco Security Group's network digital video provides monitoring, access control, intrusion detection and fence intrusion in applications for retail, corporate, petrochemical, and government use at airports, seaports, and high-security facilities.

Access Control Systems and Biometrics: The Access Control systems prevent unauthorized entry into controlled environments. Ademco's biometric solutions include authenticating identities using fingerprint, palm geometry, iris, vein, voice, facial and other human characteristics.

Managed Services: Outsourced security functions such as remote surveillance and video control meant for small-medium enterprises.

Robot Security: The company launched Robot as a Service (RAAS) in 2017. The robots are autonomous four-wheel vehicles that use artificial intelligence to patrol an area like a security guard.

== Awards ==
The company is the only security company in Singapore audited with the SS540 certification for Business Continuity Management by the international certification organization TUV SUD PSB PTE Ltd. In 2013 the company was cited as an honoree in the 2013 Spirit of Enterprise Award competition, a Singapore-based non-profit organization that recognizes innovation and achievement among small to medium size (SME) entrepreneurships. In 2015, the company was honored in both the Singapore Enterprise 50 Awards and the Singapore Prestige Brand Awards in the Heritage Brands category. In 2017, it was named the Overall Winner of the 2017 Entrepreneur of the Year awards in the Established Entrepreneur category.
