= Arumugham Mahendran =

Indian businessman

A Mahendran
- Born: 1 February 1955 (age 70); India
- Occupation: Brand Builder
- Title: Chairman & Managing Director at Global Consumer Products Pvt. Ltd.
- Spouse: Mythili Mahendran
- Children: Akshay Mahendran, Vaishnavi Mahendran

Arumugham Mahendran is an Indian entrepreneur and the chairman and managing director of Global Consumer Products Private Limited, a ‘‘'synthetic startup'’' in the consumer goods sector. He is the former managing director of Godrej Consumer Products Limited.

== Early life and education ==
Mahendran holds a degree in Bachelors in Commerce from the Loyola College, Chennai, India and qualified as a Chartered Accountant in 1979. He also completed Advanced Management Programs from the MIT Sloan School of Management, Northwestern University's Kellogg School of Management and the University of Michigan's Stephen M. Ross School of Business.

== Career ==
Mahendran began his career as a partner with Chartered Accountancy firm RNG Price & Associates in 1980. In 1987, he joined Transelektra Domestic Products Limited (owned by Mr. Mohan, who created brands Good Knight and HIT). Transelektra was sold to the Godrej Group in 1994.

Mahendran then became the managing director of Godrej Hicare Limited. Within a year he sold a 51% stake in Godrej Hicare Limited to the Sara Lee Corporation, USA, valuing the company at Rs. 3.8 Billion. In 2010, he acquired Sara Lee's 51% for the Godrej Group and integrated the business with Godrej Consumer Products Limited. As managing director, Mahendran steered the merger and acquisition cell at Godrej Consumer Products Limited. Over a period of 3 years from 2010 to 2013, he also spearheaded Godrej Group's inorganic growth around the globe through merger & acquisition. Some of the acquisitions concluded were Tura brands (Nigeria), Megasari (Indonesia), Issue Group (Argentina) and Darling Group (South Africa).

In 1996, Mahendran promoted a beverage company, GoodLife Industries Limited, focusing on South India and producing beverages under the brand name CheriO. This brand was subsequently bought by Global Consumer Products Private Limited. He also set up and promoted Harvey Heart Hospital, a super specialty cardiac care hospital in Chennai, India and continues to be its promoter and director. The hospital provides clinical care for patients with heart disorders.

In 2009, Mahendran promoted an online intimate apparel company called Daiki Brands Private Limited. In 2012, Mahendran sold 49% of the business to Brand Capital (A Bennett, Coleman & Company firm) at a valuation of Rs. 3 Billion.

In 2014, Mahendran created a synthetic start up, ‘'Global Consumer Products Private Limited'’ in the FMCG space. This joint venture along with private equity players Goldman Sachs (US) and Mitsui & Co. (Japan) was started on 1 February 2014. Mahendran is the promoter, shareholder, chairman and managing director. The company has set up two offices (Bangalore and Mumbai) and developed and launched the chocolate brand, LuvIt, in the southern states of India.

In January 2014, Mahendran partnered with IVF (India Value Fund) to acquire a 100% stake in ISS Hicare, a [est management firm, for Rs. 1.5 Billion.

Mahendran and Bala V. Balachandran founded Great Lakes Institute of Management.
