= Clive Thompson (businessman) =

British businessman (born 1943)

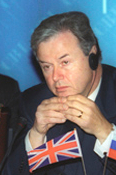
Sir Clive Thompson in 2000

Sir Clive Malcolm Thompson (born 4 April 1943) is a British businessman who is deputy chairman of Strategic Equity Capital plc. He was chairman of Rentokil Initial plc between 2002 and 2004, having been chief executive for 20 years to 2002. He is a former president of the CBI, member of the Committee on Corporate Governance and deputy chairman of the Financial Reporting Council. He is a former chairman of European Home Retail plc and director of J Sainsbury plc, Wellcome plc, Seeboard plc, Caradon plc and BAT Industries plc.

He was educated at the University of Birmingham (BSc).

Following the collapse of Farepak, the UK Insolvency Service applied to the High Court for Thompson to be disqualified as a Director, but the case was later dropped.
