= Luke Hines =

British racing driver (born 1982)

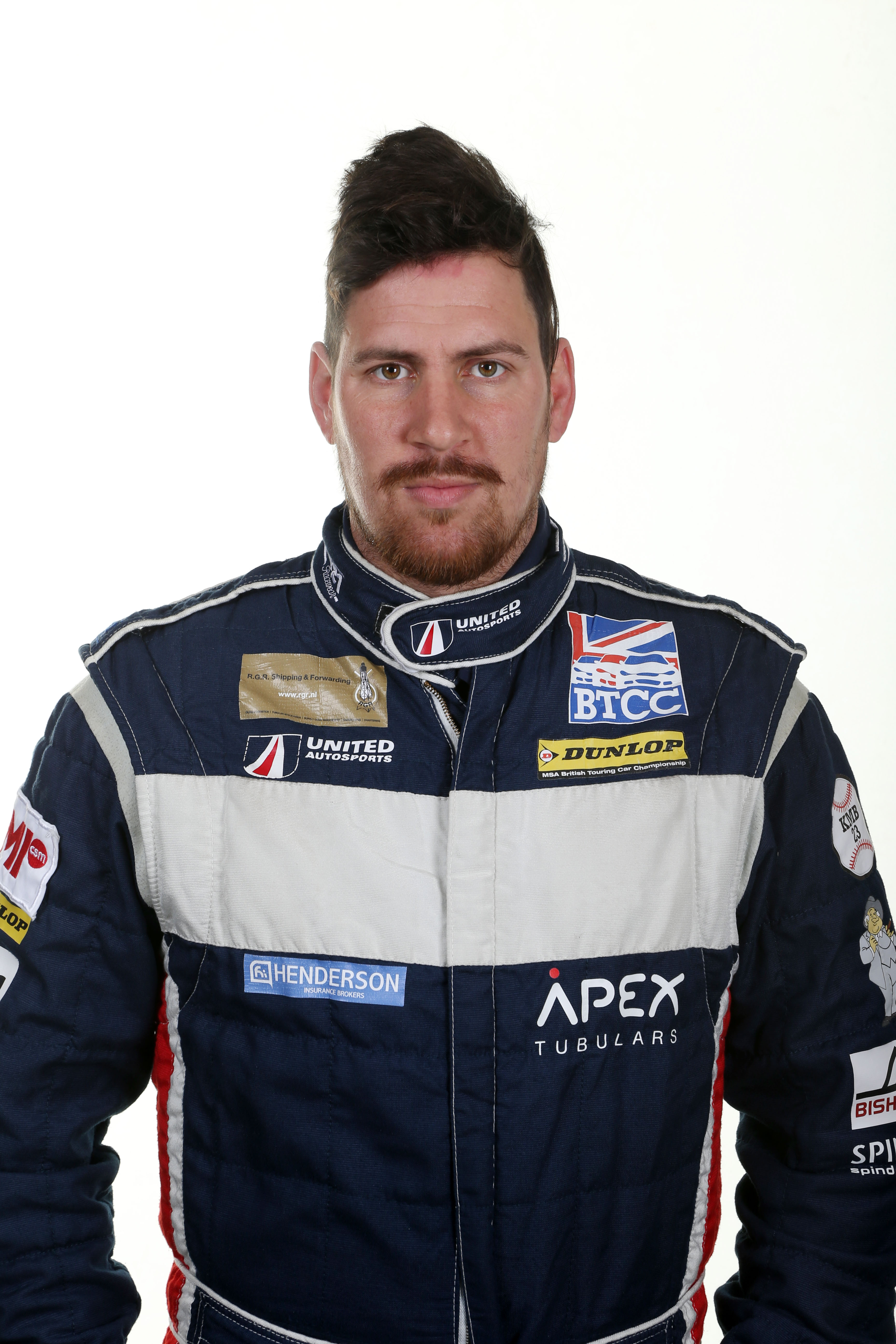
- Hines in 2014
- Nationality: (United Kingdom) British
- Born: 4 May 1982 (age 44) Hoddesdon, Hertfordshire, United Kingdom
- Relatives: Martin Hines (father)

Previous series
- 2003-2005: British Touring Car Championship

Luke Hines (born 4 May 1982 in Hoddesdon, Hertfordshire) is a British racing driver. He is the son of former karting champion and Zip Kart founder/owner Martin Hines.

== Career ==
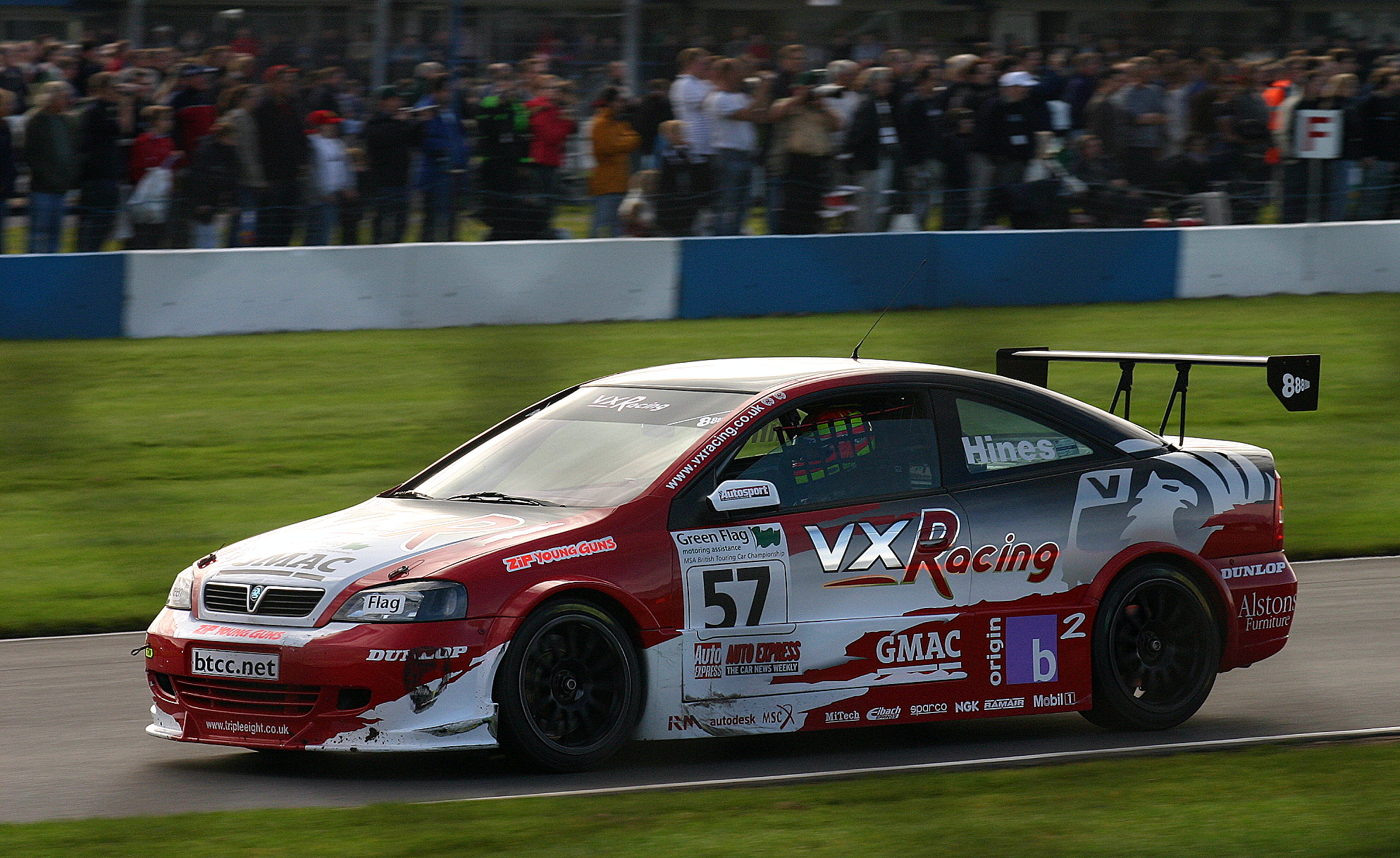
Hines driving for Vauxhall at Donington Park during the 2004 British Touring Car Championship season.

After a small amount of open wheel racing in Formula Ford, Hines tested a Production Class Alfa Romeo 156 for Gary Ayles' team following the conclusion of the 2002 British Touring Car Championship. He entered the Production Class of the BTCC in 2003, with the Barwell Motorsport team. He was the class champion in a field of five full-time drivers. He did enough to be noticed by Vauxhall, who signed him for a 2004 assault on the Touring Class, when he won two races and finished 10th overall. In 2005, he switched to the SEAT team, moving up a place to ninth with one race win. He returned to the BTCC for the final two meetings of 2014 in place of Glynn Geddie at United Autosports.

For 2006, Hines moved to the British GT Championship driving a Panoz Esperante for the LNT team. He immediately established himself as one of the front runners along with his team mate Tom Kimber-Smith and led the championship after a pair of wins at Mondello Park. Hines and Kimber-Smith ended the year second in the standings, missing out on the title by just two points. Hines returned to British GT in 2008, partnering Jeremy Metcalfe in a Ferrari F430 GT3 and finishing runner-up a second time. He raced partial seasons in 2012, 2013 and for a final year in 2014, in which he earned a podium at Rockingham Motor Speedway.

Hines has established kart racing team AllStars Racing, announcing in April 2018 that he would be working with ten-year-old Deaf racer Caleb McDuff in preparation for McDuff's campaign in the 2018 Super 1 National Kart Championships.

== Racing record ==
=== Complete British Touring Car Championship results ===
(key) (Races in bold indicate pole position – 1 point awarded in first race, 2003 in class) (Races in italics indicate fastest lap – 1 point awarded all races, 2003 in class) (* signifies that driver lead race for at least one lap – 1 point awarded all races)

Year	Team	Car	Class	1	2	3	4	5	6	7	8	9	10	11	12	13	14	15	16	17	18	19	20	21	22	23	24	25	26	27	28	29	30	Pos	Pts	Class
2003	Barwell Motorsport	Honda Civic Type-R	P	**MON**; **1** Ret	MON; 2 DNS	**BRH**; **1** ovr:15 cls:2	BRH; 2 ovr:12 cls:2	THR; 1 ovr:13 cls:2	THR; 2 ovr:13 cls:2	**SIL**; **1** ovr:11 cls:1	**SIL**; **2** ovr:11 cls:1	**ROC**; **1** ovr:18 cls:6	ROC; 2 ovr:11 cls:1	CRO; 1 ovr:16 cls:3	CRO; 2 ovr:13 cls:1	**SNE**; **1** ovr:10 cls:1	**SNE**; **2** ovr:14 cls:2	**BRH**; **1** ovr:18 cls:2	BRH; 2 ovr:18 cls:3	**DON**; **1** ovr:14 cls:1	**DON**; **2** ovr:17 cls:1	**OUL**; **1** ovr:17 cls:2	OUL; 2 ovr:14 cls:2											N/A	**243**	**1st**
2004	VX Racing	Vauxhall Astra Coupé		THR; 1 Ret	THR; 2; 7	THR; 3; 5	BRH; 1; 9	BRH; 2; 1*	**BRH**; **3**; 10	SIL; 1; 8	SIL; 2; 14	SIL; 3; 11	OUL; 1 Ret	OUL; 2; 9	OUL; 3; 11	MON; 1; 6	MON; 2; 3	MON; 3; 2	CRO; 1; 8	CRO; 2; 14	CRO; 3; 8	KNO; 1; 15	KNO; 2; 5	KNO; 3; 6	BRH; 1; 5	BRH; 2; 10	BRH; 3; 7	SNE; 1; 10	**SNE**; **2**; 1*	**SNE**; **3**; 8	DON; 1; 6	DON; 2; 10	DON; 3 Ret	10th	115	
2005	SEAT Sport UK	SEAT Toledo Cupra		DON; 1; 7	DON; 2; 8	DON; 3; 9	THR; 1; 8	THR; 2; 8	THR; 3; 8*	BRH; 1; 5	BRH; 2 Ret	BRH; 3 Ret	OUL; 1; 7	OUL; 2 Ret	OUL; 3; 5	CRO; 1 Ret	CRO; 2; 9	CRO; 3; 6	MON; 1; 12	MON; 2; 5	MON; 3 Ret	SNE; 1; 10	SNE; 2; 8	SNE; 3 Ret	KNO; 1; 7	KNO; 2; 5	KNO; 3 Ret	SIL; 1; 6	SIL; 2; 1*	SIL; 3 Ret	BRH; 1 Ret	BRH; 2; 7	BRH; 3 Ret	9th	87	
2014	United Autosports	Toyota Avensis		BRH; 1	BRH; 2	BRH; 3	DON; 1	DON; 2	DON; 3	THR; 1	THR; 2	THR; 3	OUL; 1	OUL; 2	OUL; 3	CRO; 1	CRO; 2	CRO; 3	SNE; 1	SNE; 2	SNE; 3	KNO; 1	KNO; 2	KNO; 3	ROC; 1	ROC; 2	ROC; 3	SIL; 1; 20	SIL; 2; 20	SIL; 3 Ret	BRH; 1 Ret	BRH; 2 Ret	BRH; 3; 17	30th	0	
