= Studio Retail Group =

British home shopping company

Studio Retail Trading Limited
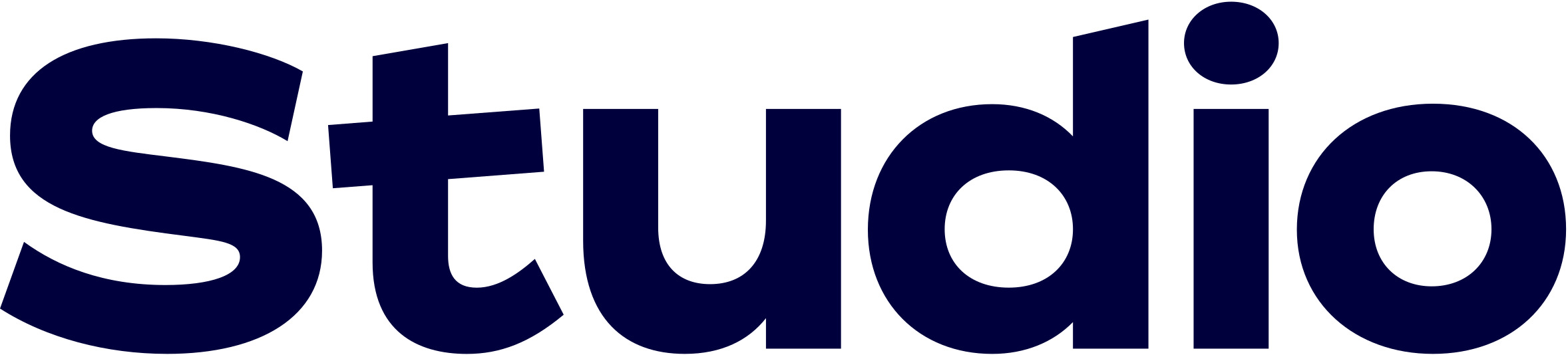
- Type: Subsidiary
- Traded as: Studio, Studio Retail
- Industry: Retail
- Founded: 1962
- Headquarters: Shirebrook, Derbyshire
- Area served: UK
- Products: Clothing; Electronics; Furniture; Homeware; Jewellery; Christmas; Gifts
- Services: Studio Pay
- Revenue: ▼£330.3 million (2023)
- Operating income: ▲£12.1 million (2023)
- Number of employees: 2700+
- Parent: Frasers Group
- Website: Studio; Studio Pay

Studio, (formerly part of Studio Retail Group, formerly known as Findel plc) is a British home shopping business and is a wholly owned subsidiary of the Frasers Group. Studio was founded in 1962, under the name "Fine Art Developments".

It operates online and through catalogues and currently sells electronics, furniture, homeware and gifts. Studio also offered a buy now, pay later service called Studio Pay.

In 2022, Studio was purchased out of administration by Frasers Group for £26.8 million.

== History ==
Findel started as a greeting card company and went public in the early 1960s under the name "Fine Art Developments." It spun off its greeting card business in 1997 as a separate company called "Creative Publishing", which was subsequently acquired by Hallmark Cards in 1998. The company changed its name to "Findel plc" in 2000 and then to Studio Retail Group plc in 2019.

It was previously listed on the London Stock Exchange between the early 1960s to 2022, before the company fell into administration. Shares were suspended on 14 February 2022 when it announced its intention to appoint administrators.

In August 2010, Findel sold CWIO, Confetti.co.uk and I Want One of Those (IWOOT) to The Hut Group.

In April 2013, Findel sold its healthcare division, NRS, to LDC, and in March 2015 Findel sold its Kleeneze business to CVSL Inc.

Studio's previous logo

In February 2016, Findel sold its online sports retailing business, Kitbag, to the leading US provider of licensed sports apparel and merchandise, Fanatics, Inc., a snub to Mike Ashley & Sports Direct who had expressed interest in the brand. Sports Direct acquired an 18.9% share in Findel but was unsuccessful in appointing a director.

In April 2017, Findel appointed Phil Maudsley as group CEO.

In June 2019, Findel announced plans to rename itself as Studio Retail Group, and this change came into effect in July.

In April 2021, Studio sold the Findel Education businesses for £30 million.

In February 2022, Studio announced its intention to appoint administrators because options to secure additional borrowing had failed, leaving it insolvent. Its shares are currently suspended on the London Stock Exchange.

In February 2022, Studio Retail Group announced plans to call in administrators after a £25 million funding bid failed. The company's assets was then purchased by Frasers Group for £26.8 million.

== Studio Pay ==
Studio Pay's Logo

Studio Pay is a buy now, pay later service allowing customers to spread the cost of their purchase over varied payment terms. The service and credit is provided by Frasers Group Financial Services Limited, a part of Frasers Group. Studio Pay was later retired, being folded into Frasers Plus.

Studio Pay can be used with retailers such as Sports Direct, House of Fraser, USC, Flannels.

== Leadership ==
In 2020, Studio Retail Group PLC nominated Paul Kendrick as the CEO of the Group. He took over from the previous CEO, Phil Maudsley, when he retired in March 2021.

Kendrick joined the company as Studio Retail's commercial and deputy managing director in May 2016 before being promoted to managing director in April 2017. In December 2019, he was appointed to the company's board of directors.

Kendrick stepped down from Studio in 2023 after the business was integrated into Frasers Group following its acquisition in 2022

== Former operations ==
- Findel Wholesale Limited
- Findel Europe B.V.
- Findel Sourcing (Shanghai) Limited
- Findel Asia Sourcing Limited
- Findel Education
- Express Gifts Philippines Inc
- Kitbag
- Kleeneze
- CWIO
- I Want One Of Those
- Confetti.co.uk
- NRS
