= 2010 Masters of Formula 3 =

Race details
Date	6 June 2010
Official name	Masters of Formula 3
Location	Circuit Park Zandvoort, Netherlands
Course	4.307 km (2.676 mi)
Distance	25 laps, 107.675 km (66.906 mi)

Pole
Driver	(United Kingdom) Alexander Sims	ART Grand Prix
Time	1:30.956

Fastest Lap
Driver	(France) Jean-Éric Vergne	Carlin
Time	1:32.788 (on lap 17 of 25)

Podium
First	(Finland) Valtteri Bottas	ART Grand Prix
Second	(United Kingdom) Alexander Sims	ART Grand Prix
Third	(Germany) Marco Wittmann	Signature

The 2010 Masters of Formula 3 was the twentieth Masters of Formula 3 race, and was held at Circuit Park Zandvoort in the Netherlands on 6 June 2010.

The race was won by Valtteri Bottas, for ART Grand Prix, becoming the first person to win the event twice, having won the race the year before. The podium was completed by other Formula 3 Euro Series drivers, with Bottas' team-mate Alexander Sims finishing second having started from pole position, while Signature's Marco Wittmann was third.

== Drivers and teams ==
2010 Entry List
Team	No	Driver	Chassis (Note: All drivers competed in Dallara chassis; model listed.)	Engine	Main series
(France) ART Grand Prix	1	(Finland) Valtteri Bottas	F308	Mercedes	Formula 3 Euro Series
(France) ART Grand Prix	2	(United Kingdom) Alexander Sims	F308	Mercedes	Formula 3 Euro Series
(France) ART Grand Prix	3	(France) Jim Pla	F308	Mercedes	Formula 3 Euro Series
(United Kingdom) Carlin Motorsport	4	(France) Jean-Éric Vergne	F308	Volkswagen	British Formula 3
(United Kingdom) Carlin Motorsport	5	(Malaysia) Jazeman Jaafar	F308	Volkswagen	British Formula 3
(United Kingdom) Carlin Motorsport	6	(Brazil) Lucas Foresti	F308	Volkswagen	British Formula 3
(United Kingdom) Carlin Motorsport	7	(United Kingdom) Rupert Svendsen-Cook	F308	Volkswagen	British Formula 3
(France) Signature	9	(Italy) Edoardo Mortara	F309	Volkswagen	Formula 3 Euro Series
(France) Signature	10	(Germany) Marco Wittmann	F308	Volkswagen	Formula 3 Euro Series
(France) Signature	11	(Belgium) Laurens Vanthoor	F308	Volkswagen	Formula 3 Euro Series
(France) Signature	12	(Netherlands) Stef Dusseldorp	F308	Volkswagen	German Formula Three
(United Kingdom) Hitech Racing	14	(Brazil) Gabriel Dias	F310	Volkswagen	British Formula 3
(United Kingdom) Hitech Racing	15	(United Kingdom) William Buller	F310	Volkswagen	British Formula 3
(Germany) Mücke Motorsport	16	(Spain) Roberto Merhi	F308	Mercedes	Formula 3 Euro Series
(Germany) Mücke Motorsport	17	(Colombia) Carlos Muñoz	F308	Mercedes	Formula 3 Euro Series
(Germany) Mücke Motorsport	18	(Netherlands) Nigel Melker	F308	Mercedes	GP3 Series
(Italy) Prema Powerteam	21	(Spain) Daniel Juncadella	F309	Mercedes	Formula 3 Euro Series
(Italy) Prema Powerteam	22	(France) Nicolas Marroc	F308	Mercedes	Formula 3 Euro Series
(United Kingdom) Sino Vision Racing	24	(Hong Kong) Adderly Fong	F308	Mercedes	British Formula 3
(United Kingdom) Sino Vision Racing	25	(United Kingdom) Wayne Boyd	F308	Mercedes	British Formula 3
(Germany) Motopark Academy	27	(Portugal) António Félix da Costa	F308	Volkswagen	Formula 3 Euro Series
(Germany) Motopark Academy	28	(Finland) Matias Laine	F308	Volkswagen	Formula 3 Euro Series
(United Kingdom) CF Racing/Manor Motorsport	30	(United Kingdom) Hywel Lloyd	F308	Mercedes	British Formula 3
(United Kingdom) CF Racing/Manor Motorsport	31	(Indonesia) Rio Haryanto	F308	Mercedes	GP3 Series

== Classification ==
=== Qualifying ===
Pos	No	Driver	Team	Q1	Q2
1	2	(United Kingdom) Alexander Sims	ART Grand Prix	1:31.724	1:30.956
2	1	(Finland) Valtteri Bottas	ART Grand Prix	1:31.728	1:31.112
3	10	(Germany) Marco Wittmann	Signature	1:31.841	1:31.463
4	16	(Spain) Roberto Merhi	Mücke Motorsport	1:31.991	1:31.641
5	17	(Colombia) Carlos Muñoz	Mücke Motorsport	1:32.127	1:31.667
6	18	(Netherlands) Nigel Melker	Mücke Motorsport	1:32.667	1:31.687
7	9	(Italy) Edoardo Mortara	Signature	1:31.812	1:31.713
8	4	(France) Jean-Éric Vergne	Carlin	1:31.992	1:31.765
9	15	(United Kingdom) William Buller	Hitech Racing	1:32.747	1:31.780
10	3	(France) Jim Pla	ART Grand Prix	1:32.544	1:31.812
11	27	(Portugal) António Félix da Costa	Motopark Academy	1:32.150	1:31.969
12	21	(Spain) Daniel Juncadella	Prema Powerteam	1:36.221	1:31.993
13	5	(Malaysia) Jazeman Jaafar	Carlin	1:32.724	1:32.070
14	11	(Belgium) Laurens Vanthoor	Signature	1:32.077	no time
15	12	(Netherlands) Stef Dusseldorp	Signature	1:32.868	1:32.086
16	7	(United Kingdom) Rupert Svendsen-Cook	Carlin	1:33.008	1:32.125
17	14	(Brazil) Gabriel Dias	Hitech Racing	1:32.803	1:32.238
18	22	(France) Nicolas Marroc	Prema Powerteam	1:33.008	1:32.430
19	6	(Brazil) Lucas Foresti	Carlin	1:33.046	1:32.529
20	28	(Finland) Matias Laine	Motopark Academy	1:33.170	1:32.569
21	30	(United Kingdom) Hywel Lloyd	CF Racing/Manor Motorsport	1:33.194	1:32.777
22	31	(Indonesia) Rio Haryanto	Manor Motorsport	1:35.889	1:33.099
23	25	(United Kingdom) Wayne Boyd	Sino Vision Racing	1:33.753	1:34.501
24	24	(Hong Kong) Adderly Fong	Sino Vision Racing	1:33.834	1:34.798

=== Race ===
Pos	No	Driver	Team	Laps	Time/Retired	Grid
1	1	(Finland) Valtteri Bottas	ART Grand Prix	25	0:41:38.851	2
2	2	(United Kingdom) Alexander Sims	ART Grand Prix	25	+1.131	1
3	10	(Germany) Marco Wittmann	Signature	25	+11.054	3
4	4	(France) Jean-Éric Vergne	Carlin	25	+12.693	8
5	9	(Italy) Edoardo Mortara	Signature	25	+18.563	7
6	14	(Brazil) Gabriel Dias	Hitech Racing	25	+1:07.717	17
7	6	(Brazil) Lucas Foresti	Carlin	25	+1:11.166	19
8	25	(United Kingdom) Wayne Boyd	Sino Vision Racing	25	+1:14.084	23
9	30	(United Kingdom) Hywel Lloyd	CF Racing/Manor Motorsport	25	+1:15.227	21
10	31	(Indonesia) Rio Haryanto	Manor Motorsport	24	+1 lap	22
11	15	(United Kingdom) William Buller	Hitech Racing	24	+1 lap	9
12	16	(Spain) Roberto Merhi	Mücke Motorsport	24	+1 lap	4
13	7	(United Kingdom) Rupert Svendsen-Cook	Carlin	24	+1 lap	16
14	18	(Netherlands) Nigel Melker	Mücke Motorsport	24	+1 lap	6
15	17	(Colombia) Carlos Muñoz	Mücke Motorsport	24	+1 lap	5
16	21	(Spain) Daniel Juncadella	Prema Powerteam	23	+2 laps	12
17	24	(Hong Kong) Adderly Fong	Sino Vision Racing	23	+2 laps	24
18	27	(Portugal) António Félix da Costa	Motopark Academy	23	+2 laps	11
19	22	(France) Nicolas Marroc	Prema Powerteam	23	+2 laps	18
20	28	(Finland) Matias Laine	Motopark Academy	22	+3 laps	20
21	12	(Netherlands) Stef Dusseldorp	Signature	22	+3 laps	15
22	11	(Belgium) Laurens Vanthoor	Signature	22	+3 laps	14
Ret	5	(Malaysia) Jazeman Jaafar	Carlin	2	Retired	13
Ret	3	(France) Jim Pla	ART Grand Prix	2	Retired	10
Fastest lap: Jean-Éric Vergne, 1:32.788, 167.104 km/h (103.834 mph) on lap 17
