= Daniel McKenzie (racing driver) =

British racing driver

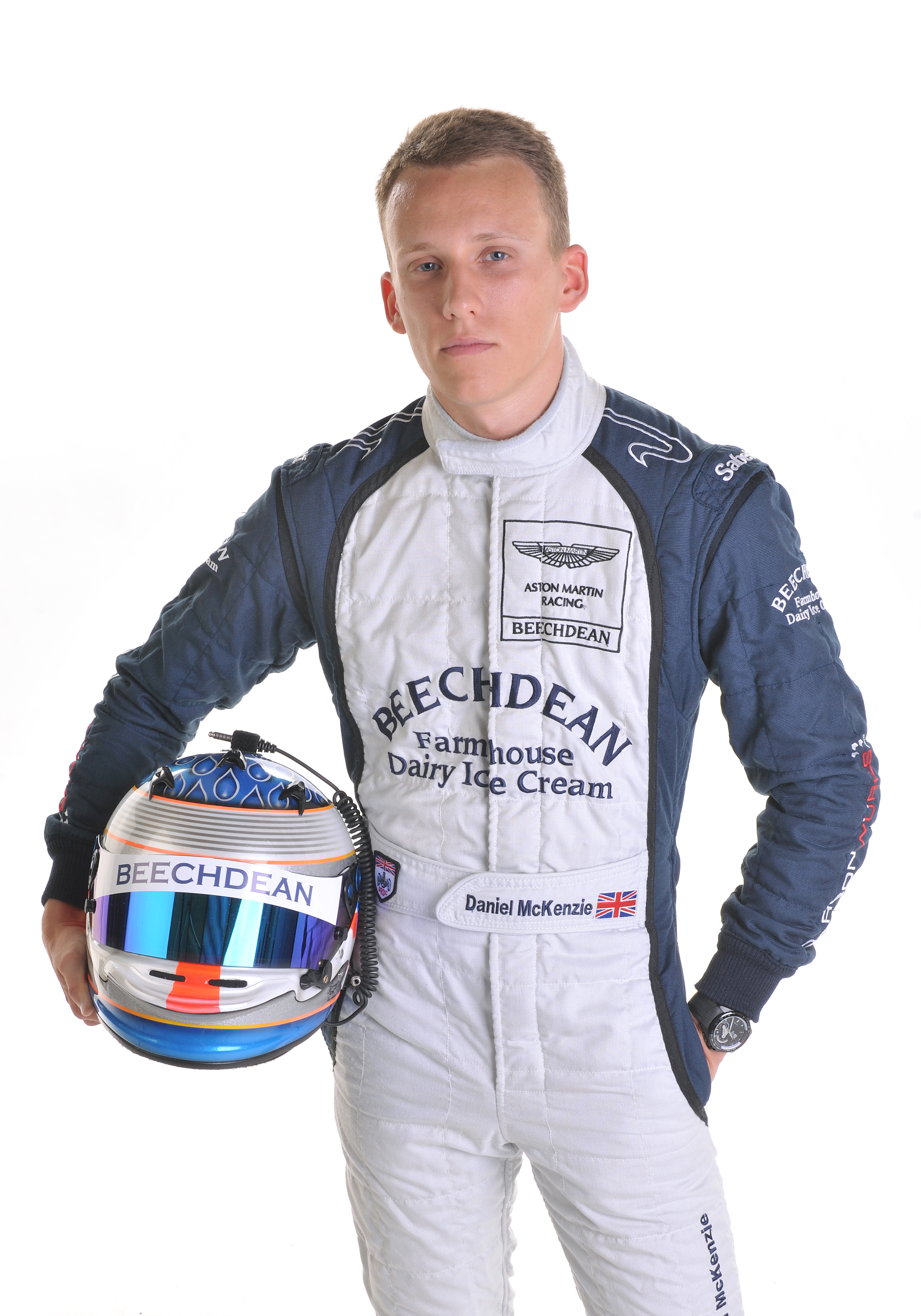
- Daniel McKenzie in his 2013 Beechdean Racing Suit. Currently competing in the Blancpain Endurance Series.
- Nationality: (United Kingdom) British
- Born: 24 October 1988 (age 38) Reading, England

Blancpain Endurance Series career
- Debut season: 2013
- Current team: Beechdean Motorsport
- Categorisation: FIA Silver
- Car number: 99

Previous series
- 2012 2011 2010 2009 2008 2008 2007 2006–07 2005: FIA Formula Two Championship; Formula Renault 3.5 Series; British F3 International Class; British F3 National Class; Eurocup Formula Renault 2.0; Formula Renault 2.0 WEC; Formula BMW ADAC; Formula BMW UK; Radical SR4 Biduro Championship

Championship titles
- 2009: British F3 National Class

Daniel McKenzie (born 24 October 1988 in Reading, Berkshire) is a British former professional racing driver.

== Career ==
=== Early career ===
Like most young drivers, McKenzie began his career in karting, racing in the Junior Rotax class before making his car racing debut in the Radical SR4 Biduro Championship in 2005, where he finished in fourth place.

=== Formula BMW ===
In 2006, McKenzie made his debut in single–seaters, taking part in the Formula BMW UK series with the Promatecme – RPM team. In his maiden season, he scored three points to finish in 19th place. At the end of the year, he changed to the Fortec Motorsport team to contest the Formula BMW World Final in Valencia, where he finished 20th.

McKenzie continued with Fortec in Formula BMW UK for 2007, ending the season in eleventh position, with teammate Marcus Ericsson taking the title. He once again entered the Formula BMW World Final in Valencia at the end of the season, but retired from the race. He also competed in two races of the Formula BMW ADAC championship in Germany.

=== Formula Renault 2.0 ===
The following year, McKenzie graduated to Formula Renault, racing in both the Eurocup Formula Renault 2.0 and Formula Renault 2.0 West European Cup with Fortec Motorsport. In the Eurocup, he failed to score a point, taking a best race result of 14th in his home round at Silverstone, whilst in the West European Cup he took one points finish at Estoril to be classified 23rd in the final standings.

=== Formula Three ===
In 2009, McKenzie made the step up to the British Formula 3 Championship with Fortec, racing in the National Class for older Dallara F307 chassis. He secured the title at the penultimate round of the season in Portimão, on the same weekend when Daniel Ricciardo won the International Class title. During the season, McKenzie took nineteen podium places out of a possible twenty races, including eleven class wins, with his only race retirement coming in the first race at Hockenheim, where he collided with National Class rival Gabriel Dias.

At the end of the season, McKenzie made his first appearance in the famous Macau Grand Prix event. After finishing 25th in the qualification race, he was forced to retire from the main event following a multi–car accident on the opening lap.

McKenzie moved into the International Class for the 2010 season, staying with Fortec where he was joined by Oliver Webb and Max Snegirev. He finished the season in ninth place overall, taking two reverse–grid victories at Rockingham Motor Speedway and Brands Hatch along with two other podium places. He was also the only driver in the International Class to finish all 30 races during the season.

=== Formula Renault 3.5 Series ===
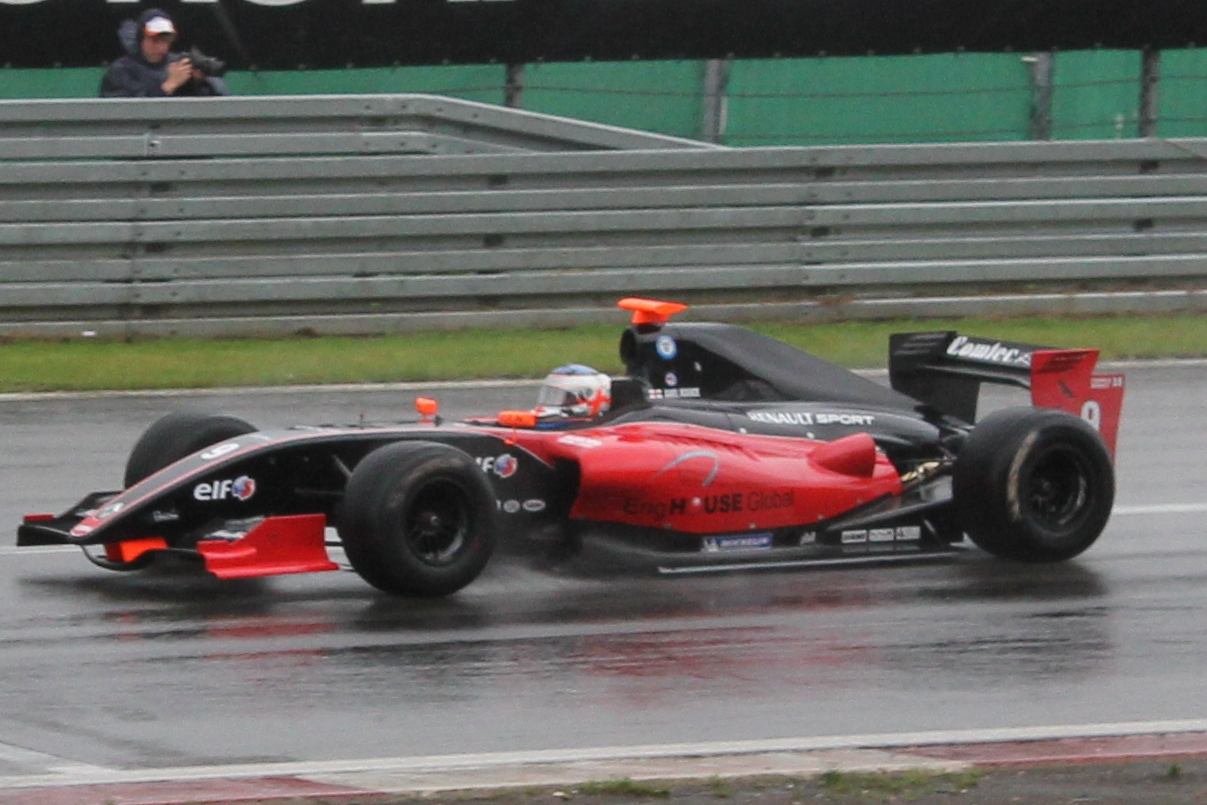
Daniel McKenzie at the 2011 Nürburgring World series by Renault round

After taking part in Formula Renault 3.5 Series testing with Fortec in October 2010, McKenzie stepped up to the series for the 2011 season, joining former champions Comtec Racing where he partnered Formula Renault 2.0 graduate Daniël de Jong.

=== Formula Two ===
In March 2012, it was announced McKenzie would make the switch to the FIA Formula Two Championship for 2012.

== Racing record ==
=== Career summary ===
Season	Series	Team	Races	Wins	Poles	F/Laps	Podiums	Points	Position
2005	Radical SR4 Biduro Championship	RPM Motorsport	?	?	?	?	?	?	4th
2006	Formula BMW UK	Promatecme – RPM	20	0	0	0	0	3	19th
2006	Formula BMW World Final	Fortec Motorsport	1	0	0	0	0	N/A	20th
2007	Formula BMW UK	Fortec Motorsport	18	0	0	0	0	402	11th
2007	Formula BMW ADAC	Fortec Motorsport	2	0	0	0	0	20	30th
2007	Formula BMW World Final	Fortec Motorsport	1	0	0	0	0	N/A	NC
2008	Formula Renault 2.0 West European Cup	Fortec Motorsport	15	0	0	0	0	4	23rd
2008	Eurocup Formula Renault 2.0	Fortec Motorsport	12	0	0	0	0	0	36th
2009	British Formula 3 Championship – National Class	Fortec Motorsport	20	11	6	11	19	351	**1st**
2009	Macau Grand Prix	Fortec Motorsport	1	0	0	0	0	N/A	NC
2010	British Formula 3 Championship	Fortec Motorsport	30	2	1	1	4	109	9th
2011	Formula Renault 3.5 Series	Comtec Racing	17	0	0	0	0	0	30th
2012	FIA Formula Two Championship	Motorsport Vision	16	0	0	0	2	95	9th

=== Complete Eurocup Formula Renault 2.0 results ===
(key) (Races in bold indicate pole position; races in italics indicate fastest lap)

Year	Entrant	1	2	3	4	5	6	7	8	9	10	11	12	13	14	DC	Points
2008	Fortec Motorsport	SPA; 1; 26	SPA; 2; 19	SIL; 1; 19	SIL; 2; 14	HUN; 1 DNQ	HUN; 2 DNQ	NÜR; 1; 32	NÜR; 2; 31	LMS; 1; 20	LMS; 2; 23	EST; 1; 19	EST; 2; 19	CAT; 1; 15	CAT; 2; 19	36th	0

=== Complete Formula Renault 3.5 Series results ===
(key) (Races in bold indicate pole position) (Races in italics indicate fastest lap)

Year	Entrant	1	2	3	4	5	6	7	8	9	10	11	12	13	14	15	16	17	DC	Points
2011	Comtec Racing	ALC; 1; 18	ALC; 2; 23	SPA; 1; 19	SPA; 2; 17	MNZ; 1; 13	MNZ; 2 Ret	MON; 1; 15	NÜR; 1; 15	NÜR; 2; 20	HUN; 1; 18	HUN; 2; 22	SIL; 1; 17	SIL; 2 Ret	LEC; 1; 18	LEC; 2 Ret	CAT; 1; 17	CAT; 2; 12	30th	0

=== Complete FIA Formula Two Championship results ===
(key) (Races in bold indicate pole position) (Races in italics indicate fastest lap)

Year	1	2	3	4	5	6	7	8	9	10	11	12	13	14	15	16	Pos	Points
2012	SIL; 1; 5	SIL; 2; 4	ALG; 1; 13	ALG; 2; 6	NÜR; 1; 8	NÜR; 2; 8	SPA; 1; 2	SPA; 2; 18	BRH; 1; 10	BRH; 2; 8	LEC; 1; 3	LEC; 2; 8	HUN; 1; 4	HUN; 2; 9	MNZ; 1; 11	MNZ; 2; 10	9th	95

Sporting positions
Preceded by Jay Bridger	British Formula 3 National Class; Champion; 2009	Succeeded by Menasheh Idafar
