= 2009 Macau Grand Prix =

Formula Three motor race

Race details
Date	22 November 2009
Official name	56th Windsor Arch Macau Grand Prix
Location	Guia Circuit, Macau
Course	Temporary street circuit 6.120 km (3.803 mi)
Distance	Qualifying Race; 10 laps, 61.200 km (38.028 mi); Main Race; 15 laps, 91.800 km (57.042 mi)
Weather	Qualifying Race: Cool, windy Main Race: Cool, sunny and dry
- Qualifying Race

Pole
Driver	(Sweden) Marcus Ericsson	TOM'S
Time	2:10.042

Fastest Lap
Driver	(France) Jean-Karl Vernay	Signature
Time	2:10.906 (on lap 7 of 10)

Podium
First	(France) Jean-Karl Vernay	Signature
Second	(Sweden) Marcus Ericsson	TOM'S
Third	(Italy) Edoardo Mortara	Signature
- Main Race

Pole
Driver	(France) Jean-Karl Vernay	Signature

Fastest Lap
Driver	(Italy) Edoardo Mortara	Signature
Time	2:10.732 (on lap 10 of 15)

Podium
First	(Italy) Edoardo Mortara	Signature
Second	(France) Jean-Karl Vernay	Signature
Third	(United Kingdom) Sam Bird	ART Grand Prix

The 2009 Macau Grand Prix Formula Three was the 56th Macau Grand Prix race held on the streets of Macau on 22 November 2009. It was supported by the 2009 Guia Race of Macau. The TOM'S team were looking for their third Macau win in succession, after Oliver Jarvis and Keisuke Kunimoto won the race in the previous two years. TOM'S did start the weekend well, with Marcus Ericsson taking pole position in the combined qualifying session, but Signature dominated the rest of the weekend, with Jean-Karl Vernay taking the race victory in the qualifying race, and Edoardo Mortara taking the Macau Grand Prix itself.

== Entry list ==
- All drivers competed in Dallara F308 chassis.

2009 Entry List
Team	No	Driver	Engine	Main series
(Japan) TOM'S	1	(Sweden) Marcus Ericsson	Toyota-TOM'S	All-Japan Formula Three
(Japan) TOM'S	2	(Japan) Takuto Iguchi	Toyota-TOM'S	All-Japan Formula Three
(France) ART Grand Prix	3	(France) Jules Bianchi	Mercedes	Formula 3 Euro Series
(France) ART Grand Prix	4	(Finland) Valtteri Bottas	Mercedes	Formula 3 Euro Series
(France) ART Grand Prix	5	(United Kingdom) Sam Bird	Mercedes	Formula 3 Euro Series
(United Kingdom) Carlin	6	(Australia) Daniel Ricciardo	Volkswagen	British Formula 3
(United Kingdom) Carlin	7	(New Zealand) Brendon Hartley	Volkswagen	Formula 3 Euro Series
(United Kingdom) Carlin	8	(United Kingdom) Max Chilton	Volkswagen	British Formula 3
(United Kingdom) Carlin	9	(United Kingdom) Henry Arundel	Volkswagen	British Formula 3
(Japan) Toda Racing	10	(Italy) Kei Cozzolino	Honda-Toda	All-Japan Formula Three
(United Kingdom) Hitech Racing	11	(Finland) Mika Mäki	Volkswagen	Formula 3 Euro Series
(United Kingdom) Hitech Racing	12	(United Kingdom) Wayne Boyd	Volkswagen	British Formula 3
(France) Signature	14	(France) Jean-Karl Vernay	Volkswagen	Formula 3 Euro Series
(France) Signature	15	(Belgium) Laurens Vanthoor	Volkswagen	German Formula Three
(France) Signature	16	(Italy) Edoardo Mortara	Volkswagen	GP2 Series
(United Kingdom) City of Dreams/ Räikkönen Robertson	17	(Netherlands) Renger van der Zande	Mercedes	British Formula 3
(United Kingdom) City of Dreams/ Räikkönen Robertson	18	(United Kingdom) Alexander Sims	Mercedes	Formula 3 Euro Series
(United Kingdom) City of Dreams/ Räikkönen Robertson	19	(Taiwan) Kevin Chen	Mercedes	British Formula 3
(Hong Kong) Champ Motorsport	19	(Taiwan) Kevin Chen	Mercedes	British Formula 3
(Hong Kong) Champ Motorsport	20	(Macau) Michael Ho	Mercedes	Formula V6 Asia
(United Kingdom) Manor Motorsport	20	(Macau) Michael Ho	Mercedes	Formula V6 Asia
(United Kingdom) Manor Motorsport	21	(Colombia) Carlos Huertas	Mercedes	British Formula 3
(United Kingdom) Manor Motorsport	22	(Spain) Roberto Merhi	Mercedes	Formula 3 Euro Series
(Japan) NOW Motor Sports	23	(Japan) Yuji Kunimoto	Toyota-TOM'S	All-Japan Formula Three
(Japan) Le Beausset Motorsports	24	(Japan) Koki Saga	Toyota-TOM'S	All-Japan Formula Three
(United Kingdom) Fortec Motorsport	25	(Spain) Víctor García	Mercedes	British Formula 3
(United Kingdom) Fortec Motorsport	26	(United Kingdom) Daniel McKenzie	Mercedes	British Formula 3
(United Kingdom) Fortec Motorsport	27	(United States) Jake Rosenzweig	Mercedes	Formula 3 Euro Series
(Italy) Prema Powerteam	28	(Monaco) Stefano Coletti	Mercedes	Formula 3 Euro Series
(Italy) Prema Powerteam	29	(Italy) Daniel Zampieri	Mercedes	Italian Formula Three
(Germany) Kolles & Heinz Union	30	(Netherlands) Stef Dusseldorp	Volkswagen	German Formula Three
(Germany) Kolles & Heinz Union	31	(Switzerland) Alexandre Imperatori	Volkswagen	All-Japan Formula Three

== Report ==
=== Practice and qualifying ===
All-Japan Formula Three champion Marcus Ericsson was immediately on the pace, setting the fastest time in the first half-hour session that was held prior to the first qualifying session. Ericsson's lap was over half a second faster than has nearest rival Edoardo Mortara, with two of the three Carlin cars filling positions three and four, with Brendon Hartley just edging out Daniel Ricciardo by 0.019 seconds. Stefano Coletti and Valtteri Bottas rounded out the top six. During the session, four drivers hit the wall, including all three Fortec Motorsport cars, and the Prema Powerteam machine of Daniel Zampieri.

"I'm a bit blown away to tell you the truth, it has not only exceeded day one's expectations, but it has exceeded the whole weekend's expectations! To be honest, it is my first time ever on any type of street circuit and I feel quite comfortable with it. It's not as daunting as I would have thought. For sure Carlin prepare a quick car everywhere but especially here each year they do a good job as well. Volkswagen have also given us a few mods for the weekend, so having the confidence in the car definitely helps. I have also studied a lot of on boards over the years and tried to build my way up to it. I've told myself that if these guys can do it then I should be able to. It is really just a confidence thing."

— Daniel Ricciardo, after impressing on his first day's running in Macau.

The first qualifying session saw Ericsson on top once again, improving his time by over a second from the practice session; but only secured the top spot, after a late crash by Signature's Laurens Vanthoor at Police, brought out a session-ending red flag. Ricciardo was top rookie as he ended up second, less than a tenth off the Swedish teenager's time. Having been usurped by those late runs, Mortara and Hartley wound up third and fourth, ahead of the first ART Grand Prix car of Sam Bird. Despite his late accident, Vanthoor finished sixth, ahead of Coletti, Hitech Racing's Mika Mäki, the third Signature machine of Formula 3 Euro Series veteran Jean-Karl Vernay and Bottas, who like Vanthoor, crashed during the session. Manor Motorsport cars filled row six with Carlos Huertas just shading Roberto Merhi by just 0.027 seconds, which put them ahead of the third Carlin of Max Chilton, the Räikkönen Robertson duo of Renger van der Zande (14th) and Alexander Sims (16th), with somewhat surprisingly, Formula 3 Euro Series champion Jules Bianchi splitting the pair, in fifteenth position. Ericsson's team-mate Takuto Iguchi was the fastest of the Japanese trio in seventeenth, ahead of Kei Cozzolino, Wayne Boyd, Koki Saga, Jake Rosenzweig, Yuji Kunimoto (the brother of 2008 winner Keisuke) and the Kolles & Heinz Union pair of Stef Dusseldorp and Alexandre Imperatori. Rounding out the thirty runners were local favourite Michael Ho, British Formula 3 National Class champion Daniel McKenzie, the unwell Henry Arundel, Víctor García, Kevin Chen and Zampieri, who did not set a time after his crash in the earlier practice session.

A second thirty-minute practice session was held the following day, with Mortara setting the fastest time; the only driver to break into the 2:10s. His lap of 2:10.593, was an unofficial lap record as it was the fastest lap ever recorded at the Guia Circuit. It was more than a second under Marko Asmer's official lap record, set in 2007. Eight other drivers were also under the old mark, with tenth place Bianchi just outside the record. Ricciardo continued his fine form in second, despite not improving his time after a mid-session setup change. Bottas was third ahead of Hartley, Ericsson, Bird and the rest. Apart from an accident involving Chen at Maternity, this session passed relatively peacefully.

"I am feeling confident. I know we are quick and we are strong, but it is going to be tough. I know starting from pole position is not always an advantage here, but we will see how the start goes and try and be in the top positions in the first race. Then we will try and win the second one. It has already been a tough weekend and there is still quite a way to go, but we got one part of it done, so it feels good. I was pushing quite hard and had got pole. Then I went on the radio and they said it was really tight as the other guys are quick. So I tried to push a bit harder and then I went in the wall. It was okay. I bent a wishbone, but it was not a problem. I am looking good for tomorrow. I am here with probably the best team in the world and I am very proud to be a part of that. We've had a good weekend so far."

— Marcus Ericsson, after taking pole position for TOM'S.

After topping the first qualifying session, Ericsson continued his form into second practice, recording the fastest lap in the history of the Macau Guia Circuit. His lap of 2:10.042 put him on pole position, despite hitting the barriers at Matsuya close to the end of qualifying, and damaging his rear wing. After setting the ninth-fastest time during the Thursday qualifying session, Vernay joined Ericsson on the front row after setting a time fractionally slower than his Swedish rival. Bottas lined up third, also moving up seven places from his Thursday position, and was joined on row two by Mortara. Ricciardo wound up in fifth position, after making an error at Lisboa which resulted in his front wing making slight contact with the barriers, and was the only other driver within a second of Ericsson's pace. The two remaining ART Grand Prix cars adorned row four with Bianchi edging out Bird, while the top ten was completed by Coletti and Mäki. Iguchi again finished up as the top Japanese runner in eleventh position, ahead of Hartley, who did not improve on his Thursday time and thus tumbled from row two to row six, as he recorded the thirteenth fastest time in the session. Merhi's twelfth-fastest time put him thirteenth in the classification, ahead of Sims, van der Zande, Kunimoto, Chilton and Boyd. Huertas held onto nineteenth overall, despite only being 26th in the session after suffering from engine gremlins that restricted him to just one flying lap. Rosenzweig, Cozzolino, Zampieri, García, Saga, Dusseldorp, Imperatori, Arundel, McKenzie, Ho and Chen completed the grid.

=== Qualification Race ===
"Kris Nissen [the Volkswagen motorsport chief] told me at Hockenheim that if I wanted to go to Macau I would have to win the race there. I won that race – and now he said, if I don't want to come back next year, I have to win on Sunday! So, I have to win tomorrow. For sure, I was not expecting to do a new lap record and a qualifying like that. You need a bit of experience to be fast on this track, but the car was just fantastic. It has a good engine and a good car for the city. I like this track. I push a lot but I also don't take a lot of risks. I really like the city tracks – like Pau and Monaco for example, and I knew that this track would be for me. My Signature team has had good results here, with Edoardo [Mortara] last year and Nicolas Lapierre in the past. We have a good car, a good engine – in fact a perfect engine for the straights. I was catching Marcus [Ericsson], not easily, but I was catching him. I had a good feeling with the car straight away too. I can attack with it – and take no risks. A lot of drivers in qualifying were in the wall because they were at 200 per cent, and me I was just improving my driving lap after lap to take not so many risks. And finally I won. But I don't care if it is the main race or the qualifying race. I was fast today and for sure the aim is to win tomorrow, but we will see what happens. I just take pleasure from it, and we will see."

— Jean-Karl Vernay, after surprising himself by taking victory and a new outright lap record.

After hitting the wall on countless occasions over the previous two days, Chen was withdrawn from the race due to a cracked monocoque. Thus, this left the grid at 29 for the 10-lap race, and Vernay got the jump on Ericsson away from the start-finish line, and took the lead into the first corner, but by the time the drivers had reached Lisboa, Ericsson was back in front just as the safety car came out. Further back, Bianchi rode over the rear wheel of Mortara at San Francisco, causing enough damage for the Frenchman to pit. Rosenzweig collided with the barriers at the Mandarin, which brought the safety car out for three laps. Arundel's Carlin car encountered mechanical troubles under the safety car, after some debris punctured a hole in the radiator of his Volkswagen engine. This left the order as Ericsson, Vernay, Mortara (who moved up despite his collision), Bottas, Ricciardo, Vanthoor, Bird, Coletti, Mäki and Hartley. Boyd moved up five positions at the start, as he was the biggest winner off the line.

At the lap four restart, Vernay made ground up on Ericsson, and managed to slipstream past the All-Japan Formula Three champion on the run to Lisboa. Ricciardo tried a similar move on Bottas but could not manage to complete the pass, and such was his momentum loss, Vanthoor managed to slip through on the Australian into fifth position. Another Carlin driver in the wars was Hartley, as he clouted Coletti out of eighth position. Over the succeeding laps, Asmer's lap record from 2007 took a pounding as first Mortara and then Vernay took the lap record into the 2:10 bracket. However, any further progress for the record to fall was halted by a huge accident that befell Boyd on lap seven. Running in eleventh position, the young Ulsterman pulled out to pass his team-mate Mäki on the exit of the Mandarin, but clipped the car's left rear wheel at 170 mph. Boyd's Dallara became airborne and was launched into a frightening aerial somersault, landing upside down before righting itself via a hit with the retaining wall. His car rebounded across the circuit, and was luckily avoided by every one of the cars around him on track. The crash meant the last three laps of the race were completed behind the safety car, and pulled in to allow the cars to pass across the line without overtaking. This allowed Vernay to win the race, securing pole position for the main race on Sunday. Ericsson was second ahead of Mortara – once he had returned the place back to the Swede – with Bottas, Vanthoor, Ricciardo, Bird, Iguchi, Merhi and Mäki completing the top ten. Outside the top ten were van der Zande, Kunimoto, Sims, García, Chilton, Cozzolino, Dusseldorp, Saga, Huertas, Zampieri, Bianchi and Coletti after their respective collisions, Imperatori, Hartley, McKenzie and Ho rounded out the 26 classified finishers.

=== Warm-up ===
A twenty-minute warm-up session was held on the morning of the main race. Mortara again managed to squeeze out Ericsson to top the timesheets, with Coletti also being within a tenth of a second from the fastest time. Ricciardo was fourth ahead of Bottas, van der Zande, Sims, Chilton, Merhi and the qualification race winner Vernay. Ho and Boyd did not set times during the session, with the Ulsterman's Hitech Racing car looking unlikely to start the race after his accident on Saturday.

=== Main Race ===
"I am feeling so, so emotional because I had such a difficult season this year, with so many up and downs. I came here because VW phoned me to ask me to do the race, and I am sure some people were not 100 per cent sure that I was able to do it. Actually, today, I proved that I am still competitive. After such a difficult season to be on top again is unbelievable. It shows that you should keep fighting, and I am really proud of this victory especially after this difficult season. I think Jean-Karl drove an unbelievable race today. I am not saying this because I won, but he is in his first year here and I really struggled so much to overtake. I was 120 per cent on every corner of every lap, and I think he made a mistake. This allowed me to close a little bit the gap and get a little bit closer on the race track. This was his only mistake of the weekend and it cost him the victory because I was really pushing hard and I couldn't overtake him. He drove an excellent race, we had exactly the same car and he showed today that he is a fantastic and really talented driver – because it was really difficult for me today. I have the experience, it is my third Macau, it is his first Macau. He is sad, but I was sad last year, and I am the first one who can understand him, but if he is coming back he will win for sure. [Before] I came here, like I said before, I think everybody was thinking that I was pretty much dead. So re-opening my career with a victory in Macau will for sure help me. Nothing is done because it is a lot a question about money now. We will see next year if I have the chance to race in a professional way. I will probably take my chance. I will work with my management to sort things out and I am sure we will try to take the best option. We will see."

— Edoardo Mortara, on a lap record and his life-changing Macau victory.

After his victory in the qualification race, Vernay started from pole position with Ericsson starting alongside, with Mortara and Bottas on row two. Due to damage inflicted in his spectacular accident the previous day, Boyd did not start, thus leaving the grid at 28 cars. Once again, Ericsson made an awful getaway, with Bottas and Mortara both slotting in behind a fast-starting Vernay. Into Lisboa, Ricciardo got alongside Ericsson as they battled for fourth with the Australian brushing the wall and the two continued side by side into San Francisco, with Ricciardo again nudging the wall. Behind them, Vanthoor left his braking far too late for Lisboa, and mounted over Chilton, which caused the teenage Briton to retire on the spot. Ricciardo's clip with the wall caused a left-rear puncture, but he managed to carry on up the hill, until he crashed at the entrance to the Solitude Esses. His car rebounded off the wall, and into direct line of the rest of the field. No less than half a dozen cars impacted with the stricken car, and blocked the track which ultimately led to a red flag, and a race suspension. Also taken out in the incident were the third Carlin of Hartley, the Premas of Coletti and Zampieri, the Fortecs of Rosenzweig and McKenzie, and Ho. Imperatori was also involved, returning to the pits for a lengthy period, but returned to complete three laps towards the end. Vanthoor, with a damaged front wheel after his collision with Chilton, stopped just short of the accident site, and was thus able to continue in the race.

After a lap behind the safety car, the field were let loose again at the beginning of lap three. Vernay closed in on his Italian team-mate, slipstreaming past him on the run to the Mandarin, and doing enough to hold off Mortara into Lisboa. For the ensuing laps, Vernay was doing what he had to do to keep his team-mate, who had stepped back from GP2 to rid himself of his close defeat to Keisuke Kunimoto in the previous year's race. Further back, Bianchi, who had avoided the first lap incidents was quietly moving his way up the field, and was eleventh by the end of lap seven. Sims had also dropped to the tail of the field, after a move on Cozzolino failed, and he made an unscheduled trip up the Lisboa escape road. Mortara started charging back towards Vernay, and in the process, broke the Frenchman's lap record set the day before. Mortara lowered it to a lap of 2:10.732, lapping the circuit at close to 105 mph, and well under the previous record held by Marko Asmer. Cozzolino exited the race on lap eleven, crashing at Black Sands without the need for the safety car to reappear.

The race's decisive moment also occurred on lap eleven. Coming out of the Melco Hairpin, Vernay fluffed a gear shift, and Mortara moved within half a second of him. At the line, Vernay's lead was 0.4 seconds, Mortara was in his slipstream, and the pass seemed inevitable. Sure enough, Mortara lined him up, and overtook him into Lisboa. Bird took fourth from Ericsson on the same lap, and looked set to finish behind team-mate Bottas; a far cry from his first-lap exit in 2008 after being taken out by Räikkönen Robertson Racing's Roberto Streit on the run to Mandarin. Mortara cruised to victory, winning by 1.1 seconds ahead of Vernay. Drama struck Bottas on the final lap, when he encountered a problem with one of his wheels. This cost him a podium, as both Bird and Ericsson managed to pass him. Merhi had been set for sixth, but hit the barriers at Lisboa on the final lap, and ended up being classified seventeenth. This promoted the second TOM'S car of Iguchi into sixth, ahead of van der Zande, Mäki, Kunimoto and Bianchi, who made the top ten at Merhi's expense, making up eleven positions in fifteen laps. Outside the top ten were García, Huertas, Vanthoor, Saga, Dusseldorp and Arundel. Missing from the list was Sims, who retired on the final lap with a misfire. He was classified behind Merhi in eighteenth and last.

== Classification ==
=== Qualifying ===
- Qualifying is split into two sessions, both of which being 45 minutes. One session was held on 19 November and another was held on 20 November, with the best times of each driver counting towards the grid for the qualifying race.

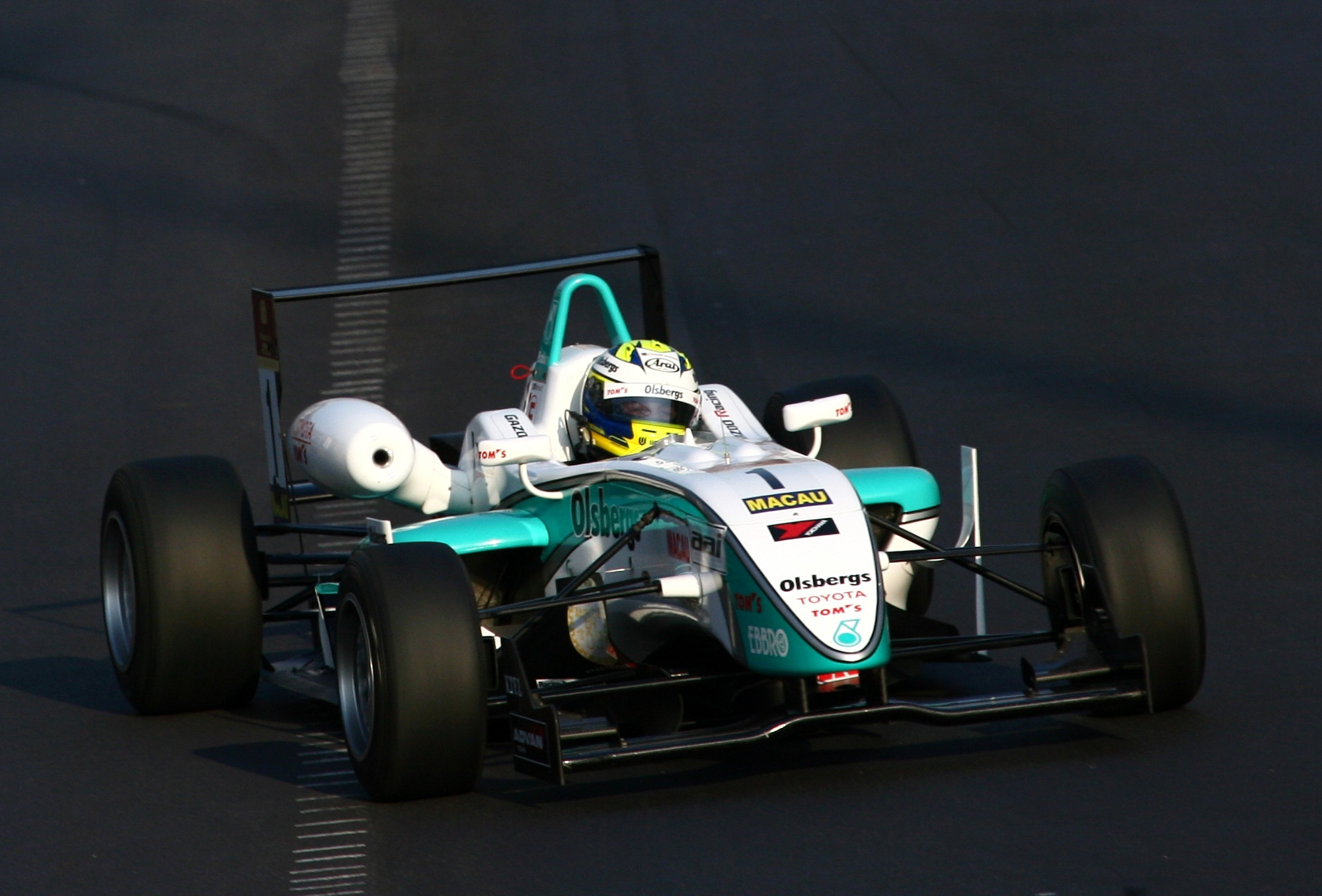
Japanese Formula Three champion Marcus Ericsson took pole position for the qualifying race, for TOM'S.

Pos	No	Driver	Team	Q1 Time	Rank	Q2 Time	Rank	Gap	Grid
1	1	(Sweden) Marcus Ericsson	TOM'S	2:11.811	1	2:10.042	1		1
2	14	(France) Jean-Karl Vernay	Signature	2:12.852	9	2:10.081	2	+ 0.039	2
3	4	(Finland) Valtteri Bottas	ART Grand Prix	2:12.910	10	2:10.108	3	+ 0.066	3
4	16	(Italy) Edoardo Mortara	Signature	2:11.903	3	2:10.234	4	+ 0.192	4
5	6	(Australia) Daniel Ricciardo	Carlin	2:11.848	2	2:10.780	5	+ 0.738	5
6	15	(Belgium) Laurens Vanthoor	Signature	2:12.532	6	2:11.073	6	+ 1.031	6
7	3	(France) Jules Bianchi	ART Grand Prix	2:13.084	15	2:11.279	7	+ 1.237	7
8	5	(United Kingdom) Sam Bird	ART Grand Prix	2:12.239	5	2:11.334	8	+ 1.292	8
9	28	(Monaco) Stefano Coletti	Prema Powerteam	2:12.605	7	2:11.476	9	+ 1.434	9
10	11	(Finland) Mika Mäki	Hitech Racing	2:12.636	8	2:11.812	10	+ 1.770	10
11	2	(Japan) Takuto Iguchi	TOM'S	2:13.203	17	2:12.024	11	+ 1.982	11
12	7	(New Zealand) Brendon Hartley	Carlin	2:12.055	4	2:12.168	13	+ 2.013	12
13	22	(Spain) Roberto Merhi	Manor Motorsport	2:12.940	12	2:12.068	12	+ 2.026	13
14	18	(United Kingdom) Alexander Sims	City of Dreams/Räikkönen Robertson	2:13.078	14	2:12.256	14	+ 2.214	14
15	17	(Netherlands) Renger van der Zande	City of Dreams/Räikkönen Robertson	2:13.127	16	2:12.306	15	+ 2.264	15
16	23	(Japan) Yuji Kunimoto	NOW Motor Sports	2:15.603	22	2:12.547	16	+ 2.505	16
17	8	(United Kingdom) Max Chilton	Carlin	2:12.994	13	2:12.568	17	+ 2.526	17
18	12	(United Kingdom) Wayne Boyd	Hitech Racing	2:14.135	19	2:12.749	18	+ 2.707	18
19	21	(Colombia) Carlos Huertas	Manor Motorsport	2:12.913	11	2:14.321	26	+ 2.871	29^{1}
20	27	(United States) Jake Rosenzweig	Fortec Motorsport	2:15.140	21	2:13.000	19	+ 2.958	19
21	10	(Italy) Kei Cozzolino	Toda Racing	2:13.453	18	2:13.051	20	+ 3.009	20
22	29	(Italy) Daniel Zampieri	Prema Powerteam	no time		2:13.734	21	+ 3.692	27^{1}
23	25	(Spain) Víctor García	Fortec Motorsport	2:19.269	28	2:13.781	22	+ 3.739	21
24	24	(Japan) Koki Saga	Le Beausset Motorsports	2:14.960	20	2:13.825	23	+ 3.783	22
25	30	(Netherlands) Stef Dusseldorp	Kolles & Heinz Union	2:16.062	23	2:13.946	24	+ 3.904	23
26	31	(Switzerland) Alexandre Imperatori	Kolles & Heinz Union	2:16.847	24	2:14.124	25	+ 4.082	28^{1}
27	9	(United Kingdom) Henry Arundel	Carlin	2:18.985	27	2:14.362	27	+ 4.320	24
28	26	(United Kingdom) Daniel McKenzie	Fortec Motorsport	2:18.431	26	2:16.210	28	+ 6.168	25
29	20	(Macau) Michael Ho	Champ Motorsport/Manor Motorsport	2:18.180	25	2:18.484	29	+ 8.138	26
30	19	(Taiwan) Kevin Chen	Champ Motorsport/Räikkönen Robertson	2:22.667	29	2:18.910	30	+ 8.868	^{2}
110% qualifying time: 2:23.046
Bold time indicates the faster of the two times that determined the grid order.

1. – Huertas, Zampieri and Imperatori were sent to the back of the field, due to engine changes after the second qualifying session. They were reassigned into positions 27–29 in the order they finished in that session.
2. – Chen had been due to start 30th, but was withdrawn with accident damage.

=== Qualification Race ===
Pos	No	Driver	Team	Laps	Time/Retired	Grid
1	14	(France) Jean-Karl Vernay	Signature	10	31:52.192	2
2	1	(Sweden) Marcus Ericsson	TOM'S	10	+ 0.271	1
3	16	(Italy) Edoardo Mortara	Signature	10	+ 1.094	4
4	4	(Finland) Valtteri Bottas	ART Grand Prix	10	+ 1.587	3
5	15	(Belgium) Laurens Vanthoor	Signature	10	+ 2.178	6
6	6	(Australia) Daniel Ricciardo	Carlin	10	+ 4.598	5
7	5	(United Kingdom) Sam Bird	ART Grand Prix	10	+ 6.093	8
8	2	(Japan) Takuto Iguchi	TOM'S	10	+ 6.665	11
9	22	(Spain) Roberto Merhi	Manor Motorsport	10	+ 8.072	13
10	11	(Finland) Mika Mäki	Hitech Racing	10	+ 9.250	10
11	17	(Netherlands) Renger van der Zande	City of Dreams/Räikkönen Robertson	10	+ 9.720	15
12	23	(Japan) Yuji Kunimoto	NOW Motor Sports	10	+ 10.493	16
13	18	(United Kingdom) Alexander Sims	City of Dreams/Räikkönen Robertson	10	+ 10.769	14
14	25	(Spain) Víctor García	Fortec Motorsport	10	+ 11.149	21
15	8	(United Kingdom) Max Chilton	Carlin	10	+ 11.627	17
16	10	(Italy) Kei Cozzolino	Toda Racing	10	+ 13.395	20
17	30	(Netherlands) Stef Dusseldorp	Kolles & Heinz Union	10	+ 14.531	23
18	24	(Japan) Koki Saga	Le Beausset Motorsports	10	+ 19.317	22
19	21	(Colombia) Carlos Huertas	Manor Motorsport	10	+ 20.060	29
20	29	(Italy) Daniel Zampieri	Prema Powerteam	10	+ 20.292	27
21	3	(France) Jules Bianchi	ART Grand Prix	10	+ 20.624	7
22	28	(Monaco) Stefano Coletti	Prema Powerteam	10	+ 21.332	9
23	31	(Switzerland) Alexandre Imperatori	Kolles & Heinz Union	10	+ 21.974	28
24	7	(New Zealand) Brendon Hartley	Carlin	10	+ 22.262	12
25	26	(United Kingdom) Daniel McKenzie	Fortec Motorsport	10	+ 23.145	25
26	20	(Macau) Michael Ho	Champ Motorsport/Manor Motorsport	10	+ 24.222	26
Ret	12	(United Kingdom) Wayne Boyd	Hitech Racing	6	Accident	18
Ret	9	(United Kingdom) Henry Arundel	Carlin	5	Engine	24
Ret	27	(United States) Jake Rosenzweig	Fortec Motorsport	0	Accident	19
DNS	19	(Taiwan) Kevin Chen	Champ Motorsport/Räikkönen Robertson		Accident damage	
Fastest lap and outright lap record: Jean-Karl Vernay, 2:10.906, 168.304 km/h (104.579 mph) on lap 7
The race finished under neutralised safety car conditions.

=== Main Race ===
Pos	No	Driver	Team	Laps	Time/Retired	Grid
1	16	(Italy) Edoardo Mortara	Signature	15	53:07.769	3
2	14	(France) Jean-Karl Vernay	Signature	15	+ 1.146	1
3	5	(United Kingdom) Sam Bird	ART Grand Prix	15	+ 10.982	7
4	1	(Sweden) Marcus Ericsson	TOM'S	15	+ 14.988	2
5	4	(Finland) Valtteri Bottas	ART Grand Prix	15	+ 19.188	4
6	2	(Japan) Takuto Iguchi	TOM'S	15	+ 21.406	8
7	17	(Netherlands) Renger van der Zande	City of Dreams/Räikkönen Robertson	15	+ 22.059	11
8	11	(Finland) Mika Mäki	Hitech Racing	15	+ 29.005	10
9	23	(Japan) Yuji Kunimoto	NOW Motor Sports	15	+ 33.348	12
10	3	(France) Jules Bianchi	ART Grand Prix	15	+ 35.761	21
11	25	(Spain) Víctor García	Fortec Motorsport	15	+ 46.923	14
12	21	(Colombia) Carlos Huertas	Manor Motorsport	15	+ 47.111	19
13	15	(Belgium) Laurens Vanthoor	Signature	15	+ 48.036	5
14	24	(Japan) Koki Saga	Le Beausset Motorsports	15	+ 54.965	18
15	30	(Netherlands) Stef Dusseldorp	Kolles & Heinz Union	15	+ 1:05.637	17
16	9	(United Kingdom) Henry Arundel	Carlin	15	+ 1:10.699	27
17	22	(Spain) Roberto Merhi	Manor Motorsport	14	Accident	9
18	18	(United Kingdom) Alexander Sims	City of Dreams/Räikkönen Robertson	14	Engine	13
Ret	10	(Italy) Kei Cozzolino	Toda Racing	10	Accident	16
NC	31	(Switzerland) Alexandre Imperatori	Kolles & Heinz Union	3	+ 12 laps	23
Ret	6	(Australia) Daniel Ricciardo	Carlin	0	Accident	6
Ret	8	(United Kingdom) Max Chilton	Carlin	0	Accident	15
Ret	29	(Italy) Daniel Zampieri	Prema Powerteam	0	Accident	20
Ret	28	(Monaco) Stefano Coletti	Prema Powerteam	0	Accident	22
Ret	7	(New Zealand) Brendon Hartley	Carlin	0	Accident	24
Ret	26	(United Kingdom) Daniel McKenzie	Fortec Motorsport	0	Accident	25
Ret	20	(Macau) Michael Ho	Champ Motorsport/Manor Motorsport	0	Accident	26
Ret	27	(United States) Jake Rosenzweig	Fortec Motorsport	0	Accident	28
DNS	12	(United Kingdom) Wayne Boyd	Hitech Racing		Accident damage	
DNS	19	(Taiwan) Kevin Chen	Champ Motorsport/Räikkönen Robertson		Accident damage	
Fastest lap and outright lap record: Edoardo Mortara, 2:10.732, 168.528 km/h (104.718 mph) on lap 10
