= 2009 British Formula 3 International Series =

Seasons
- ← 2008 2010 →

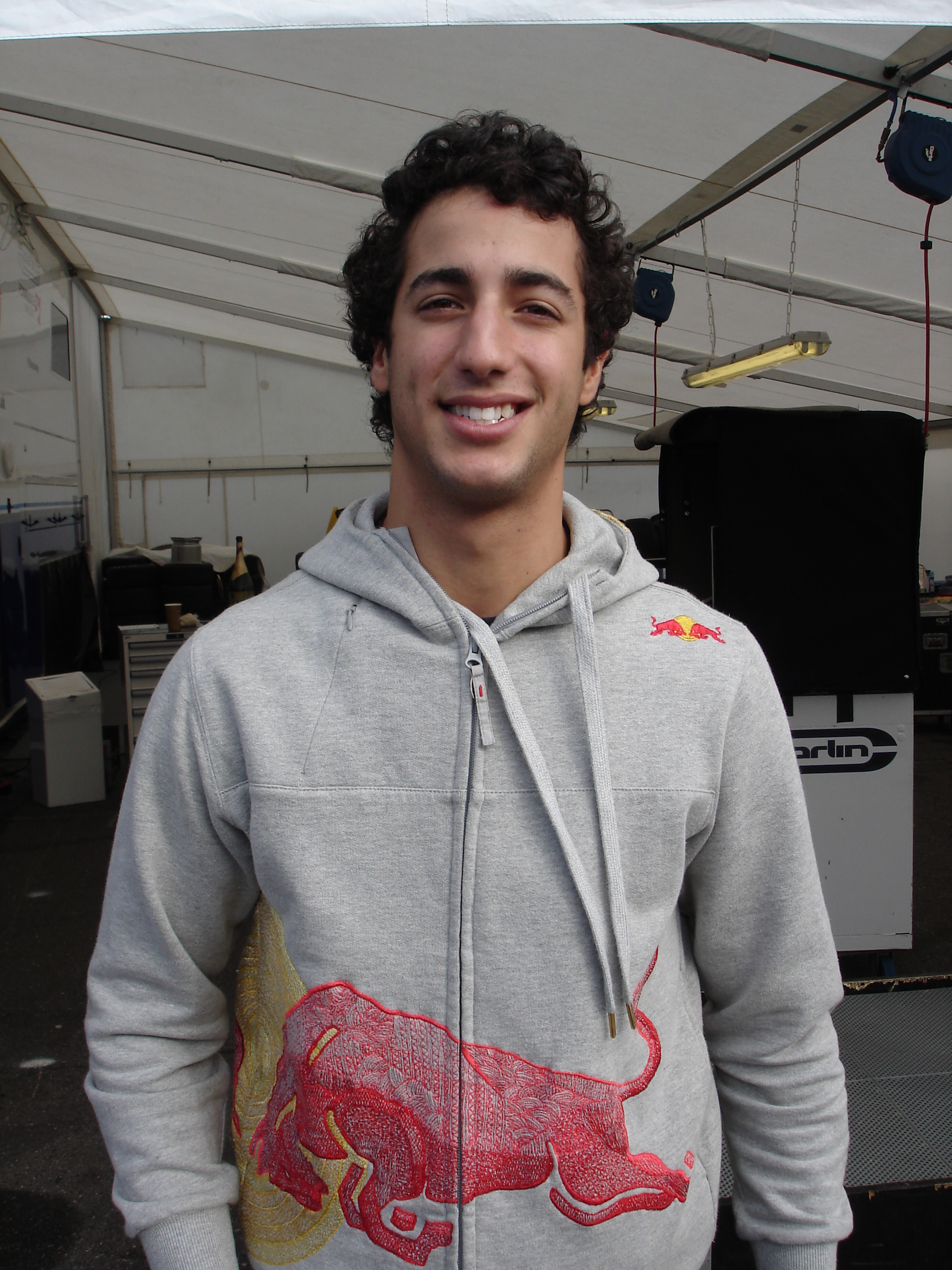
2009 champion, Daniel Ricciardo

The 2009 British Formula 3 International Series (for sponsorship reasons, the Cooper Tires British Formula 3 International Series) was the 59th British Formula 3 International Series season. It began on 13 April at Oulton Park's Easter Monday meeting and ended on 20 September at Brands Hatch after 20 rounds in four countries. Australian driver Daniel Ricciardo won the title with two races to spare, at the penultimate round at the Autódromo Internacional do Algarve in Portimão. Daniel McKenzie sealed the National Class title during the same race.

The scoring system was 20-15-12-10-8-6-4-3-2-1 points awarded to the first ten finishers, with one extra point added to the driver who set the fastest lap of the race. If a Class B driver or a guest driver finished among the top finishers, he would not score points for the main championship, and the points would be awarded to the next driver in the standings.

Three events (six rounds) were held outside the United Kingdom: Hockenheim, Spa-Francorchamps and Algarve.

== Drivers and teams ==
Team	Chassis	Engine	No	Driver	Rounds
Championship Class
(United Kingdom) Carlin Motorsport	Dallara F309	Volkswagen	1	(United Kingdom) Max Chilton	All
(United Kingdom) Carlin Motorsport	Dallara F309	Volkswagen	2	(United Kingdom) Henry Arundel	All
(United Kingdom) Carlin Motorsport	Dallara F309	Volkswagen	21	(Australia) Daniel Ricciardo	All
(United Kingdom) Carlin Motorsport	Dallara F309	Volkswagen	22	(United Kingdom) Oliver Oakes	1–2
(United Kingdom) Carlin Motorsport	Dallara F309	Volkswagen	22	(Canada) Robert Wickens	4
(United Kingdom) Carlin Motorsport	Dallara F309	Volkswagen	22	(Canada) Philip Major	5-10
(United Kingdom) T-Sport	Dallara F309	Volkswagen	3	(Brazil) Adriano Buzaid	All
(United Kingdom) T-Sport	Dallara F309	Volkswagen	4	(United Kingdom) Wayne Boyd	All
(United Kingdom) Fortec Motorsport	Dallara F309	Mercedes HWA	5	(Spain) Víctor García	All
(United Kingdom) Fortec Motorsport	Dallara F309	Mercedes HWA	51	(United Kingdom) Riki Christodoulou	All
(France) Barazi-Epsilon	Dallara F309	Mercedes HWA	7	(Monaco) Stéphane Richelmi	1–5, 7-9
(United Kingdom) Bridger Motorsport	Mygale M-09F3	Mugen-Honda	10	(United Kingdom) Jay Bridger	3-10
(United Kingdom) Team West-Tec	Mygale M-09F3	Mugen-Honda	11	(United Kingdom) Jay Bridger	1
(United Kingdom) Hitech Racing	Dallara F309	Mercedes HWA	13	(Austria) Walter Grubmüller	All
(United Kingdom) Hitech Racing	Dallara F309	Mercedes HWA	14	(Netherlands) Renger van der Zande	2-9
(United Kingdom) Räikkönen Robertson Racing	Dallara F309	Mercedes HWA	16	(Sweden) Marcus Ericsson	3-4
(United Kingdom) Räikkönen Robertson Racing	Dallara F309	Mercedes HWA	16	(New Zealand) Dominic Storey	6
(United Kingdom) Räikkönen Robertson Racing	Dallara F309	Mercedes HWA	16	(Taiwan) Kevin Chen	7-9
(United Kingdom) Räikkönen Robertson Racing	Dallara F309	Mercedes HWA	26	(Colombia) Carlos Huertas	All
(United Kingdom) Räikkönen Robertson Racing	Dallara F309	Mercedes HWA	27	(Japan) Daisuke Nakajima	All
(United Kingdom) C F Racing	Dallara F309	Mugen-Honda	25	(United Kingdom) Hywel Lloyd	All
(United Kingdom) Joe Tandy Racing	Mygale M-09F3	Mercedes HWA	28	(United Kingdom) Nick Tandy	1–4
National Class
(United Kingdom) T-Sport	Dallara F307	Mugen-Honda	43	(Brazil) Gabriel Dias	All
(United Kingdom) Team West-Tec	Dallara F307	Mugen-Honda	44	(Russia) Max Snegirev	1–3, 5-10
(United Kingdom) Team West-Tec	Dallara F307	Mugen-Honda	46	(France) Mathieu Maurage	9
(United Kingdom) Team West-Tec	Dallara F307	Mugen-Honda	64	(China) Qinghua Ma	10
(United Kingdom) Team West-Tec	Dallara F307	Mugen-Honda	66	(Italy) Michele Faccin	8
(United Kingdom) Carlin Motorsport	Dallara F305	Mugen-Honda	49	(Lebanon) Joe Ghanem	9-10
(United Kingdom) Litespeed F3	SLC R1	Mugen-Honda	53	(Indonesia) Satrio Hermanto	8-9
(United Kingdom) Litespeed F3	SLC R1	Mugen-Honda	54	(United Kingdom) Aaron Steele	5
(United Kingdom) Litespeed F3	SLC R1	Mugen-Honda	55	(Brazil) Victor Corrêa	All
(United Kingdom) Fortec Motorsport	Dallara F307	Mugen-Honda	56	(United Kingdom) Daniel McKenzie	All
Invitation Entries
(United Kingdom) Carlin Motorsport	Dallara F309	Volkswagen	23	(United States) Jake Rosenzweig	7
(United Kingdom) Fortec Motorsport	Dallara F309	Mercedes HWA	76	(United Kingdom) Sam Bird	9
(United Kingdom) Räikkönen Robertson Racing	Dallara F309	Mercedes HWA	88	(Sweden) Marcus Ericsson	10
(France) ART Grand Prix	Dallara F309	Mercedes HWA	90	(Mexico) Esteban Gutiérrez	7, 9
(France) ART Grand Prix	Dallara F309	Mercedes HWA	91	(France) Jules Bianchi	7, 9
(France) ART Grand Prix	Dallara F309	Mercedes HWA	92	(Finland) Valtteri Bottas	7, 9
(France) ART Grand Prix	Dallara F309	Mercedes HWA	94	(France) Adrien Tambay	7, 9
(Luxembourg) Racing Experience	Dallara F307	Mercedes HWA	95	(France) Nicolas Marroc	7
(United Kingdom) Manor Motorsport	Dallara F309	Mercedes HWA	96	(Brazil) Pedro Enrique	9
(United Kingdom) Manor Motorsport	Dallara F309	Mercedes HWA	97	(Spain) Roberto Merhi	9

== Calendar ==
The calendar for 2009 saw the total number of races drop from 22 to 20. Three overseas events remain, with the 24 Hours of Spa-supporting event the only one to remain from 2008. However, the Monza 1000km-supporting races and the FIA GT-support event in Bucharest were dropped to be replaced by the series' first visit to Germany and to Hockenheim, and also a visit to the brand-new Autódromo Internacional do Algarve in Portugal. Thruxton and Croft have also been dropped to be replaced with a second meeting at Silverstone. Donington's meeting was originally scheduled for 26 April, however due to ongoing issues with the circuit's track licence, the meeting was rescheduled for 19 July.

Round	Circuit	Date	Pole position	Fastest lap	Winning driver	Winning team	National Class Winner
1	(United Kingdom) Oulton Park	13 April	(United Kingdom) Max Chilton	(United Kingdom) Nick Tandy	(Australia) Daniel Ricciardo	(United Kingdom) Carlin Motorsport	(United Kingdom) Daniel McKenzie
2	(United Kingdom) Oulton Park	13 April	(Austria) Walter Grubmüller	(Austria) Walter Grubmüller	(Australia) Daniel Ricciardo	(United Kingdom) Carlin Motorsport	(United Kingdom) Daniel McKenzie
3	(United Kingdom) Silverstone Circuit	2 May	(United Kingdom) Max Chilton	(Netherlands) Renger van der Zande	(Netherlands) Renger van der Zande	(United Kingdom) Hitech Racing	(Brazil) Gabriel Dias
4	(United Kingdom) Silverstone Circuit	3 May	(United Kingdom) Max Chilton	(United Kingdom) Nick Tandy	(Australia) Daniel Ricciardo	(United Kingdom) Carlin Motorsport	(Brazil) Gabriel Dias
5	(United Kingdom) Rockingham Motor Speedway	31 May	(Australia) Daniel Ricciardo	(Netherlands) Renger van der Zande	(United Kingdom) Nick Tandy	(United Kingdom) Joe Tandy Racing	(United Kingdom) Daniel McKenzie
6	(United Kingdom) Rockingham Motor Speedway	31 May	(Sweden) Marcus Ericsson	(United Kingdom) Nick Tandy	(Sweden) Marcus Ericsson	(United Kingdom) Räikkönen Robertson Racing	(United Kingdom) Daniel McKenzie
7	(Germany) Hockenheimring	6 June	(United Kingdom) Renger van der Zande	(Netherlands) Renger van der Zande	(Sweden) Marcus Ericsson	(United Kingdom) Räikkönen Robertson Racing	(Brazil) Victor Corrêa
8	(Germany) Hockenheimring	7 June	(Austria) Walter Grubmüller	(United Kingdom) Nick Tandy	(Austria) Walter Grubmüller	(United Kingdom) Hitech Racing	(United Kingdom) Daniel McKenzie
9	(United Kingdom) Snetterton Motor Racing Circuit	5 July	(Netherlands) Renger van der Zande	(Netherlands) Renger van der Zande	(Netherlands) Renger van der Zande	(United Kingdom) Hitech Racing	(United Kingdom) Daniel McKenzie
10	(United Kingdom) Snetterton Motor Racing Circuit	5 July	(Netherlands) Renger van der Zande	(Netherlands) Renger van der Zande	(United Kingdom) Riki Christodoulou	(United Kingdom) Fortec Motorsport	(Brazil) Gabriel Dias
11	(United Kingdom) Donington Park	19 July	(Netherlands) Renger van der Zande	(Australia) Daniel Ricciardo	(Austria) Walter Grubmüller	(United Kingdom) Hitech Racing	(United Kingdom) Daniel McKenzie
12	(United Kingdom) Donington Park	19 July	(Australia) Daniel Ricciardo	(Australia) Daniel Ricciardo	(United Kingdom) Wayne Boyd	(United Kingdom) T-Sport	(United Kingdom) Daniel McKenzie
13	(Belgium) Circuit de Spa-Francorchamps	24 July	(Australia) Daniel Ricciardo	(Australia) Daniel Ricciardo^{1}	(Australia) Daniel Ricciardo	(United Kingdom) Carlin Motorsport	(United Kingdom) Daniel McKenzie
14	(Belgium) Circuit de Spa-Francorchamps	25 July	(Brazil) Adriano Buzaid	(Colombia) Carlos Huertas^{1}	(Brazil) Adriano Buzaid	(United Kingdom) T-Sport	(Brazil) Gabriel Dias
15	(United Kingdom) Silverstone Circuit	16 August	(Australia) Daniel Ricciardo	(Australia) Daniel Ricciardo	(Australia) Daniel Ricciardo	(United Kingdom) Carlin Motorsport	(Brazil) Gabriel Dias
16	(United Kingdom) Silverstone Circuit	16 August	(Japan) Daisuke Nakajima	(United Kingdom) Max Chilton	(Netherlands) Renger van der Zande	(United Kingdom) Hitech Racing	(Brazil) Gabriel Dias
17	(Portugal) Autódromo Internacional do Algarve	13 September	(Netherlands) Renger van der Zande	(Netherlands) Renger van der Zande^{2}	(France) Jules Bianchi	(France) ART Grand Prix	(United Kingdom) Daniel McKenzie
18	(Portugal) Autódromo Internacional do Algarve	13 September	(United Kingdom) Max Chilton	(Netherlands) Renger van der Zande^{1}	(France) Jules Bianchi	(France) ART Grand Prix	(Brazil) Gabriel Dias
19	(United Kingdom) Brands Hatch, Kent	20 September	(Australia) Daniel Ricciardo	(Australia) Daniel Ricciardo	(Australia) Daniel Ricciardo	(United Kingdom) Carlin Motorsport	(United Kingdom) Daniel McKenzie
20	(United Kingdom) Brands Hatch, Kent	20 September	(Australia) Daniel Ricciardo	(United Kingdom) Max Chilton	(United Kingdom) Max Chilton	(United Kingdom) Carlin Motorsport	(Brazil) Gabriel Dias

- ^{1} Fastest lap recorded by Jules Bianchi, but he was ineligible to score the fastest lap point.
- ^{2} Fastest lap recorded by Esteban Gutiérrez, but he was ineligible to score the fastest lap point.

== Standings ==
Pos	Driver	OUL (United Kingdom)		SIL (United Kingdom)		ROC (United Kingdom)		HOC (Germany)		SNE (United Kingdom)		DON (United Kingdom)		SPA (Belgium)		SIL (United Kingdom)		ALG (Portugal)		BRH (United Kingdom)		Pts
1	(Australia) Daniel Ricciardo	1	1	5	1	Ret	5	4	8	2	2	3	5	1	2	1	3	3	5	1	4	275
2	(Austria) Walter Grubmüller	3	2	7	7	Ret	6	3	1	4	3	1	3	Ret	3	2	4	12	20	5	5	188
3	(Netherlands) Renger van der Zande			1	12	Ret	Ret	2	2	1	4	2	13	4	4	3	1	4	11			178
4	(United Kingdom) Max Chilton	17	4	2	3	5	10	5	16	6	7	6	7	8	6	4	7	6	3	2	1	171
5	(United Kingdom) Riki Christodoulou	5	6	4	2	6	DSQ	Ret	5	5	1	7	10	Ret	Ret	8	6	7	Ret	3	2	130
6	(Brazil) Adriano Buzaid	6	7	3	10	16	3	6	7	9	5	5	2	19	1	10	12	Ret	16	8	8	109
7	(Japan) Daisuke Nakajima	4	5	6	4	3	4	Ret	11	10	13	8	9	Ret	8	9	2	Ret	12	Ret	6	95
8	(Colombia) Carlos Huertas	14	14	10	8	4	Ret	7	14	Ret	12	4	4	17	7	6	5	5	4	6	9	95
9	(United Kingdom) Henry Arundel	12	9	9	6	7	2	13	9	3	8	13	6	11	5	5	9	Ret	6	7	14	90
10	(United Kingdom) Nick Tandy	2	3	8	5	1	14	DSQ	6													68
11	(Sweden) Marcus Ericsson					2	1	1	4											4	3	65
12	(United Kingdom) Wayne Boyd	7	DNS	12	11	9	11	8	Ret	15	6	10	1	Ret	12	7	8	Ret	17	15	7	50
13	(United Kingdom) Hywel Lloyd	8	11	16	13	Ret	9	10	Ret	13	15	16	11	9	9	Ret	11	10	7	10	Ret	33
14	(Spain) Víctor García	10	10	14	16	8	7	9	13	12	10	11	Ret	7	16	12	10	20	Ret	12	10	30
15	(United Kingdom) Jay Bridger	16	Ret			10	8	11	Ret	7	9	9	8	12	Ret	13	19	13	9	13	12	28
16	(Canada) Robert Wickens							Ret	3													12
17	(Canada) Philip Major									14	NC	15	Ret	10	14	Ret	13	11	Ret	Ret	13	10
18	(United Kingdom) Oliver Oakes	9	8	11	9																	7
19	(Monaco) Stéphane Richelmi	13	13	17	17	13	12	DNS	12	16	Ret			13	Ret	15	15	21	14			4
20	(Taiwan) Kevin Chen													15	15	17	18	16	18			2
21	(New Zealand) Dominic Storey											14	Ret									0
guest drivers ineligible for championship points
	(France) Jules Bianchi													2	Ret			1	1			0
	(Mexico) Esteban Gutiérrez													6	10			2	10			0
	(United Kingdom) Sam Bird																	Ret	2			0
	(Finland) Valtteri Bottas													3	Ret			Ret	Ret			0
	(United States) Jake Rosenzweig													5	Ret							0
	(France) Adrien Tambay																	8	8			0
	(Brazil) Pedro Enrique																	9	Ret			0
	(Spain) Roberto Merhi																	Ret	Ret			0
National Class
1	(United Kingdom) Daniel McKenzie	11	12	15	15	11	13	Ret	10	8	14	12	12	14	13	14	16	14	15	9	15	351
2	(Brazil) Gabriel Dias	15	DNS	13	14	12	Ret	Ret	15	11	11	18	14	20	11	11	14	17	13	11	11	295
3	(Brazil) Victor Corrêa	Ret	16	18	18	15	Ret	12	17	17	17	17	Ret	18	Ret	16	17	18	21	Ret	17	184
4	(Russia) Max Snegirev	18	15	19	Ret	14	15			19	18	Ret	Ret	DNS	DNS	20	22	19	22	Ret	Ret	108
5	(Lebanon) Joe Ghanem																	15	Ret	14	16	39
6	(United Kingdom) Aaron Steele									18	16											22
7	(Italy) Michele Faccin															18	20					20
8	(Indonesia) Satrio Hermanto															19	21	Ret	DNS			16
9	(France) Mathieu Maurage																	Ret	19			12
10	(China) Qinghua Ma																			16	Ret	10
guest drivers ineligible for championship points
	(France) Nicolas Marroc													16	Ret							0
Pos	Driver	OUL (United Kingdom)		SIL (United Kingdom)		ROC (United Kingdom)		HOC (Germany)		SNE (United Kingdom)		DON (United Kingdom)		SPA (Belgium)		SIL (United Kingdom)		ALG (Portugal)		BRH (United Kingdom)		Pts

== See also ==
- 2009 Masters of Formula 3
- 2009 Macau Grand Prix
