= 2009 Masters of Formula 3 =

Race details
Date	14 June 2009
Official name	Tango Masters of Formula 3
Location	Circuit Park Zandvoort, Netherlands
Course	4.307 km (2.676 mi)
Distance	25 laps, 107.675 km (66.906 mi)

Pole
Driver	(Finland) Valtteri Bottas	ART Grand Prix
Time	1:31.175

Fastest Lap
Driver	(Finland) Valtteri Bottas	ART Grand Prix
Time	1:33.251 (on lap 4 of 25)

Podium
First	(Finland) Valtteri Bottas	ART Grand Prix
Second	(Finland) Mika Mäki	ART Grand Prix
Third	(Monaco) Stefano Coletti	Prema Powerteam

The 2009 Tango Masters of Formula 3 was the nineteenth Masters of Formula 3 race held at Circuit Park Zandvoort on 14 June 2009. The race returned to Zandvoort after a two-year stay at Zolder. It was won by Masters debutant Valtteri Bottas, for ART Grand Prix.

== Drivers and teams ==
All drivers used Dallara F308 chassis, excepting Stefano Coletti, who used F309 model.

2009 Entry List
Team	No	Driver	Engine	Main series
(France) ART Grand Prix	1	(France) Jules Bianchi	Mercedes	Formula 3 Euro Series
(France) ART Grand Prix	2	(Finland) Valtteri Bottas	Mercedes	Formula 3 Euro Series
(France) ART Grand Prix	3	(Mexico) Esteban Gutiérrez	Mercedes	Formula 3 Euro Series
(France) ART Grand Prix	4	(France) Adrien Tambay	Mercedes	Formula 3 Euro Series
(United Kingdom) Carlin Motorsport	5	(Belgium) Laurens Vanthoor	Volkswagen	German Formula Three
(United Kingdom) Carlin Motorsport	6	(Australia) Daniel Ricciardo	Volkswagen	British Formula 3
(United Kingdom) Carlin Motorsport	7	(United Kingdom) Henry Arundel	Volkswagen	British Formula 3
(United Kingdom) Carlin Motorsport	8	(United Kingdom) Max Chilton	Volkswagen	British Formula 3
(United Kingdom) Carlin Motorsport	9	(Italy) Samuele Buttarelli	Volkswagen	European F3 Open
(United Kingdom) Carlin Motorsport	10	(United States) Jake Rosenzweig	Volkswagen	Formula 3 Euro Series
(Italy) Prema Powerteam	11	(Monaco) Stefano Coletti	Mercedes	Formula 3 Euro Series
(Italy) Prema Powerteam	12	(Italy) Matteo Chinosi	Mercedes	Formula 3 Euro Series
(Italy) Prema Powerteam	14	(Lebanon) Basil Shaaban	Mercedes	Formula 3 Euro Series
(United Kingdom) Fortec Motorsport	15	(Spain) Víctor García	Mercedes	British Formula 3
(United Kingdom) Fortec Motorsport	16	(United Kingdom) Riki Christodoulou	Mercedes	British Formula 3
(France) Signature-Plus	17	(France) Jean Karl Vernay	Volkswagen	Formula 3 Euro Series
(France) Signature-Plus	18	(Finland) Mika Mäki	Volkswagen	Formula 3 Euro Series
(France) Signature-Plus	19	(Brazil) Tiago Geronimi	Volkswagen	Formula 3 Euro Series
(United Kingdom) Hitech Racing	21	(Netherlands) Renger van der Zande	Mercedes	British Formula 3
(United Kingdom) Hitech Racing	22	(Austria) Walter Grubmüller	Mercedes	British Formula 3
(United Kingdom) Manor Motorsport	23	(Spain) Roberto Merhi	Mercedes	Formula 3 Euro Series
(United Kingdom) Manor Motorsport	24	(Brazil) Pedro Enrique	Mercedes	Formula 3 Euro Series
(United Kingdom) Manor Motorsport	25	(Brazil) César Ramos	Mercedes	Formula 3 Euro Series
(United Kingdom) Manor Motorsport	26	(Italy) Francesco Castellacci	Mercedes	Italian Formula Three
(United Kingdom) Räikkönen Robertson Racing	27	(Japan) Daisuke Nakajima	Mercedes	British Formula 3
(United Kingdom) Räikkönen Robertson Racing	28	(Colombia) Carlos Huertas	Mercedes	British Formula 3
(Germany) Mücke Motorsport	29	(United Kingdom) Sam Bird	Mercedes	Formula 3 Euro Series
(Germany) Mücke Motorsport	30	(Germany) Christian Vietoris	Mercedes	Formula 3 Euro Series
(Germany) Mücke Motorsport	31	(United Kingdom) Alexander Sims	Mercedes	Formula 3 Euro Series
(Germany) Mücke Motorsport	32	(Germany) Marco Wittmann	Mercedes	Formula 3 Euro Series
(Germany) Motopark Academy	33	(Switzerland) Christopher Zanella	Mercedes	Formula 3 Euro Series
(Germany) Motopark Academy	34	(Finland) Atte Mustonen	Mercedes	Formula 3 Euro Series
(France) SG Formula	35	(France) Alexandre Marsoin	Mercedes	Formula 3 Euro Series
(France) SG Formula	36	(Netherlands) Henkie Waldschmidt	Mercedes	Formula 3 Euro Series
(France) SG Formula	37	(Italy) Andrea Caldarelli	Mercedes	Formula 3 Euro Series
(Italy) BVM – Target Racing	43	(Italy) Daniel Zampieri	Mugen-Honda	Italian Formula Three

== Classification ==
=== Qualifying 1 ===
Group A drivers are highlighted in green.

==== Odd numbers ====
Pos	No	Name	Team	Time
1	23	(Spain) Roberto Merhi	Manor Motorsport	1:31.094
2	21	(Netherlands) Renger van der Zande	Hitech Racing	1.31.218
3	1	(France) Jules Bianchi	ART Grand Prix	1.31.333
4	17	(France) Jean Karl Vernay	Signature	1.31.343
5	31	(United Kingdom) Alexander Sims	Mücke Motorsport	1:31.580
6	29	(United Kingdom) Sam Bird	Mücke Motorsport	1:31.680
7	11	(Monaco) Stefano Coletti	Prema Powerteam	1:31.858
8	3	(France) Adrien Tambay	ART Grand Prix	1:32.075
9	33	(Switzerland) Christopher Zanella	Motopark Academy	1:32.256
10	5	(Belgium) Laurens Vanthoor	Carlin Motorsport	1:32.609
11	43	(Italy) Daniel Zampieri	BVM – Target Racing	1:32.652
12	27	(Japan) Daisuke Nakajima	Räikkönen Robertson Racing	1:32.796
13	37	(Italy) Andrea Caldarelli	SG Formula	1:32.800
14	15	(Spain) Víctor García	Fortec Motorsport	1:32.874
15	7	(United Kingdom) Henry Arundel	Carlin Motorsport	1:33.249
16	25	(Brazil) César Ramos	Manor Motorsport	1:33.308
17	35	(France) Alexandre Marsoin	SG Formula	1:33.795
18	9	(Italy) Samuele Buttarelli	Carlin Motorsport	1:34.111

==== Even numbers ====
Pos	No	Name	Team	Time
1	18	(Finland) Mika Mäki	Signature	1:31.444
2	30	(Germany) Christian Vietoris	Mücke Motorsport	1:31.522
3	2	(Finland) Valtteri Bottas	ART Grand Prix	1:31.662
4	6	(Australia) Daniel Ricciardo	Carlin Motorsport	1:31.771
5	36	(Netherlands) Henkie Waldschmidt	SG Formula	1:32.044
6	34	(Finland) Atte Mustonen	Motopark Academy	1:32.294
7	14	(Lebanon) Basil Shaaban	Prema Powerteam	1:32.314
8	12	(Italy) Matteo Chinosi	Prema Powerteam	1:32.351
9	20	(Brazil) Tiago Geronimi	Signature	1:32.395
10	28	(Colombia) Carlos Huertas	Räikkönen Robertson Racing	1:32.473
11	22	(Austria) Walter Grubmüller	Hitech Racing	1:32.627
12	8	(United Kingdom) Max Chilton	Carlin Motorsport	1:32.631
13	26	(Italy) Francesco Castellacci	Manor Motorsport	1:32.652
14	4	(Mexico) Esteban Gutiérrez	ART Grand Prix	1:32.687
15	32	(Germany) Marco Wittmann	Mücke Motorsport	1:32.708
16	10	(United States) Jake Rosenzweig	Carlin Motorsport	1:32.811
17	16	(United Kingdom) Riki Christodoulou	Fortec Motorsport	1:32.909
18	24	(Brazil) Pedro Enrique	Manor Motorsport	1:32.927

=== Qualifying 2 ===
==== Group A ====
Pos	No	Name	Team	Time
1	1	(France) Jules Bianchi	ART Grand Prix	1:31.143
2	2	(Finland) Valtteri Bottas	ART Grand Prix	1:31.175
3	18	(Finland) Mika Mäki	Signature	1:31.462
4	23	(Spain) Roberto Merhi	Manor Motorsport	1:31.538
5	11	(Monaco) Stefano Coletti	Prema Powerteam	1:31.557
6	17	(France) Jean Karl Vernay	Signature	1:31.806
7	30	(Germany) Christian Vietoris	Mücke Motorsport	1:31.818
8	31	(United Kingdom) Alexander Sims	Mücke Motorsport	1:31.863
9	21	(Netherlands) Renger van der Zande	Hitech Racing	1:32.035
10	36	(Netherlands) Henkie Waldschmidt	SG Formula	1:32.051
11	20	(Brazil) Tiago Geronimi	Signature	1:32.121
12	29	(United Kingdom) Sam Bird	Mücke Motorsport	1:32.326
13	6	(Australia) Daniel Ricciardo	Carlin Motorsport	1:32.449
14	33	(Switzerland) Christopher Zanella	Motopark Academy	1:32.489
15	3	(France) Adrien Tambay	ART Grand Prix	1:32.497
16	34	(Finland) Atte Mustonen	Motopark Academy	1:32.518
17	14	(Lebanon) Basil Shaaban	Prema Powerteam	1:32.709
18	12	(Italy) Matteo Chinosi	Prema Powerteam	1:33.119

==== Group B ====
Pos	No	Name	Team	Time
1	32	(Germany) Marco Wittmann	Mücke Motorsport	1:32.869
2	22	(Austria) Walter Grubmüller	Hitech Racing	1:32.985
3	28	(Colombia) Carlos Huertas	Räikkönen Robertson Racing	1:33.002
4	5	(Belgium) Laurens Vanthoor	Carlin Motorsport	1:33.228
5	16	(United Kingdom) Riki Christodoulou	Fortec Motorsport	1:33.330
6	26	(Italy) Francesco Castellacci	Manor Motorsport	1:33.332
7	15	(Spain) Víctor García	Fortec Motorsport	1:33.536
8	24	(Brazil) Pedro Enrique	Manor Motorsport	1:33.606
9	25	(Brazil) César Ramos	Manor Motorsport	1:33.614
10	37	(Italy) Andrea Caldarelli	SG Formula	1:33.614
11	27	(Japan) Daisuke Nakajima	Räikkönen Robertson Racing	1:33.644
12	43	(Italy) Daniel Zampieri	BVM – Target Racing	1:33.644
13	8	(United Kingdom) Max Chilton	Carlin Motorsport	1:33.651
14	4	(Mexico) Esteban Gutiérrez	ART Grand Prix	1:33.723
15	10	(United States) Jake Rosenzweig	Carlin Motorsport	1:33.747
16	7	(United Kingdom) Henry Arundel	Carlin Motorsport	1:34.049
17	9	(Italy) Samuele Buttarelli	Carlin Motorsport	1:34.177
18	35	(France) Alexandre Marsoin	SG Formula	1:34.561

=== Starting grid ===
1	(Finland) Valtteri Bottas	ART Grand Prix	2	(Finland) Mika Mäki	Signature
3	(Spain) Roberto Merhi	Manor Motorsport	4	(Monaco) Stefano Coletti	Prema Powerteam
5	(France) Jean Karl Vernay	Signature	6	(France) Jules Bianchi	ART Grand Prix
7	(Germany) Christian Vietoris	Mücke Motorsport	8	(United Kingdom) Alexander Sims	Mücke Motorsport
9	(Netherlands) Renger van der Zande	Hitech Racing	10	(Netherlands) Henkie Waldschmidt	SG Formula
11	(Brazil) Tiago Geronimi	Signature	12	(United Kingdom) Sam Bird	Mücke Motorsport
13	(Australia) Daniel Ricciardo	Carlin Motorsport	14	(Switzerland) Christopher Zanella	Motopark Academy
15	(France) Adrien Tambay	ART Grand Prix	16	(Finland) Atte Mustonen	Motopark Academy
17	(Lebanon) Basil Shaaban	Prema Powerteam	18	(Italy) Matteo Chinosi	Prema Powerteam
19	(Germany) Marco Wittmann	Mücke Motorsport	20	(Austria) Walter Grubmüller	Hitech Racing
21	(Colombia) Carlos Huertas	Räikkönen Robertson Racing	22	(Belgium) Laurens Vanthoor	Carlin Motorsport
23	(United Kingdom) Riki Christodoulou	Fortec Motorsport	24	(Italy) Francesco Castellacci	Manor Motorsport
25	(Spain) Víctor García	Fortec Motorsport	26	(Brazil) Pedro Enrique	Manor Motorsport
27	(Brazil) César Ramos	Manor Motorsport	28	(Italy) Andrea Caldarelli	SG Formula
29	(Japan) Daisuke Nakajima	Räikkönen Robertson Racing	30	(Italy) Daniel Zampieri	BVM – Target Racing
31	(United Kingdom) Max Chilton	Carlin Motorsport	32	(Mexico) Esteban Gutiérrez	ART Grand Prix
33	(United States) Jake Rosenzweig	Carlin Motorsport	34	(United Kingdom) Henry Arundel	Carlin Motorsport
35	(Italy) Samuele Buttarelli	Carlin Motorsport	36	(France) Alexandre Marsoin	SG Formula

=== Race ===
Pos	No	Driver	Team	Laps	Time/Retired	Grid
1	2	(Finland) Valtteri Bottas	ART Grand Prix	25	39:12.544	1
2	18	(Finland) Mika Mäki	Signature	25	+2.610	2
3	11	(Monaco) Stefano Coletti	Prema Powerteam	25	+18.248	4
4	1	(France) Jules Bianchi	ART Grand Prix	25	+18.749	6
5	31	(United Kingdom) Alexander Sims	Mücke Motorsport	25	+28.736	8
6	21	(Netherlands) Renger van der Zande	Hitech Racing	25	+32.838	9
7	30	(Germany) Christian Vietoris	Mücke Motorsport	25	+33.678	7
8	29	(United Kingdom) Sam Bird	Mücke Motorsport	25	+36.181	12
9	20	(Brazil) Tiago Geronimi	Signature	25	+45.165	11
10	23	(Spain) Roberto Merhi	Manor Motorsport	25	+45.165	3
11	12	(Italy) Matteo Chinosi	Prema Powerteam	25	+55.767	18
12	14	(Lebanon) Basil Shaaban	Prema Powerteam	25	+56.282	17
13	33	(Switzerland) Christopher Zanella	Motopark Academy	25	+56.460	14
14	22	(Austria) Walter Grubmüller	Hitech Racing	25	+56.866	20
15	5	(Belgium) Laurens Vanthoor	Carlin Motorsport	25	+1:00.630	22
16	16	(United Kingdom) Riki Christodoulou	Fortec Motorsport	25	+1:03.061	23
17	4	(Mexico) Esteban Gutiérrez	ART Grand Prix	25	+1:03.224	32
18	28	(Colombia) Carlos Huertas	Räikkönen Robertson Racing	25	+1:17.408	21
19	27	(Japan) Daisuke Nakajima	Räikkönen Robertson Racing	25	+1:22.465	29
20	24	(Brazil) Pedro Enrique	Manor Motorsport	25	+1:23.729	26
21	43	(Italy) Daniel Zampieri	BVM – Target Racing	25	+1:24.976	30
22	15	(Spain) Víctor García	Fortec Motorsport	25	+1:25.128	25
23	37	(Italy) Andrea Caldarelli	SG Formula	25	+1:25.486	28
24	8	(United Kingdom) Max Chilton	Carlin Motorsport	25	+1:25.783	31
25	7	(United Kingdom) Henry Arundel	Carlin Motorsport	25	+1:26.801	34
26	32	(Germany) Marco Wittmann	Mücke Motorsport	25	+1:27.014	19
27	35	(France) Alexandre Marsoin	SG Formula	25	+1:27.691	36
28	25	(Brazil) César Ramos	Manor Motorsport	25	+1:28.235	27
29	10	(United States) Jake Rosenzweig	Carlin Motorsport	25	+1:28.738	33
30	26	(Italy) Francesco Castellacci	Manor Motorsport	25	+1:29.552	24
31	9	(Italy) Samuele Buttarelli	Carlin Motorsport	25	+1:32.488	35
Ret	3	(France) Adrien Tambay	ART Grand Prix	13	Spin	15
Ret	17	(France) Jean Karl Vernay	Signature	9	Accident	5
Ret	36	(Netherlands) Henkie Waldschmidt	SG Formula	9	Accident	10
Ret	34	(Finland) Atte Mustonen	Motopark Academy	9	Gearbox	16
Ret	6	(Australia) Daniel Ricciardo	Carlin Motorsport	0	Gearbox	13
Fastest lap: Valtteri Bottas, 1:33.251, 166.274 km/h (103.318 mph) on lap 4
