= Walter Grubmüller =

Austrian racing driver

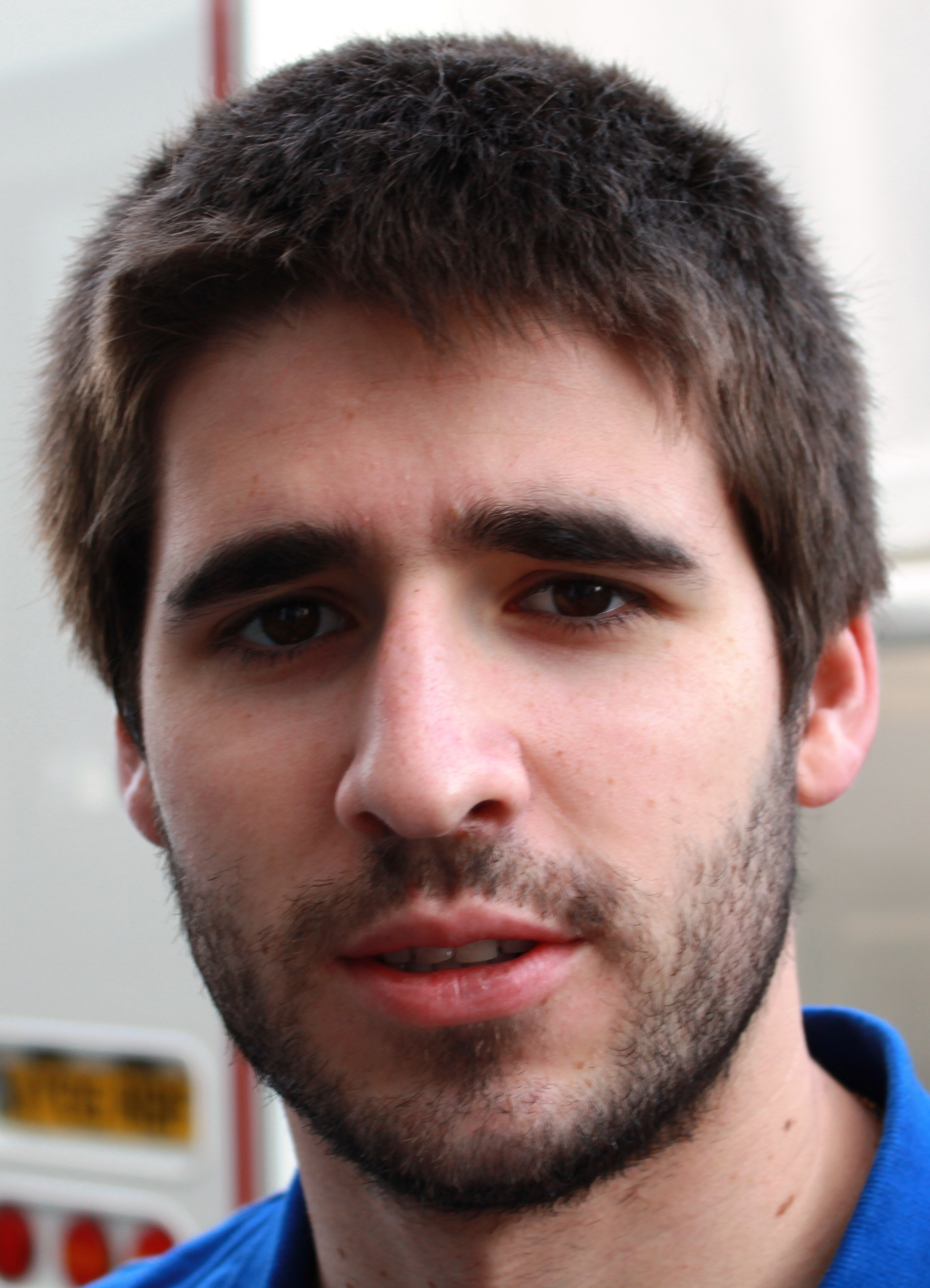
- Grubmüller in 2012.
- Nationality: Austrian
- Born: 13 January 1989 (age 37) Vienna (Austria)

Formula Renault 3.5 Series career
- Debut season: 2010
- Current team: P1 Motorsport
- Car number: 9
- Starts: 48
- Wins: 0
- Poles: 0
- Fastest laps: 0
- Best finish: 14th in 2012

Previous series
- 2007–09 2007 2006–07 2005–06 2005–06 2005 2004: British Formula 3 Australian Formula Three; Asian Formula Three; Eurocup Formula Renault 2.0; Italian Formula Renault 2.0; Italian FR2.0 Winter Series; Formula Renault Monza

Walter Grubmüller (born 13 January 1989 in Vienna) is an Austrian former racing driver.

== Career ==
=== Karting ===
Beginning his karting career in his native Austria in 2000, Grubmüller did not move up into the major international series until 2002, with an appearance at the South Garda Winter Cup. Competing in the ICA Junior class in 2003, Grubmüller finished seventh in the European Championship, and finished tied 24th with Luxembourg's Samuel Curridor, in the Italian Open Masters. Grubmüller continued at the ICA Junior level in 2004, combining a karting campaign with appearances in the Formula Renault Monza series. He moved to MGM Racing to drive one of their Birel karts, finishing eighth in the Andrea Margutti Trophy, and third behind Philipp Eng and Marco Wittmann in the Italian Open Masters.

=== Formula Renault ===
Grubmüller entered four races of the Formula Renault Monza series in 2004, for 1600cc-specification cars. He amassed eight points over those races, while competing for the BVM Minardi team. Moving to Jenzer Motorsport for 2005, Grubmüller competed in the Eurocup and Italian championships before competing in the Italian winter series later in the season. He failed to score any points in the pan-European series, with a best finish of 13th at Estoril. He scored three points in the main Italian series, and added twelve in the Winter Series. His best result of the season came in the four-race Winter Series, with fourth at Adria. Grubmüller stayed with Jenzer into 2006, and continued in both the pan-European and Italian championships. Results slowly improved, despite not scoring any points before he completed a mid-season move to Twincam Motorsport. A fifth and an eighth first time out at Donington Park were his only points-scoring finishes as he finished 19th in the championship. He also finished 20th in the Italian championship, with a best result of sixth at Hockenheim.

=== Formula Three ===
After three Asian Formula Three races in 2006 and four races in Australian Formula Three in early 2007, Grubmüller moved to British Formula 3 for the 2007 season. His father Walter had bought into the Hitech Racing team, and installed his son as one of the drivers alongside Marko Asmer. Grubmüller finished only four of the races in the points, while Asmer won eleven races to lift the series title. In the international races, Grubmüller finished 18th at the Macau Grand Prix, while he failed to finish at the Masters of Formula 3 event at Zolder. At the end of the season, Grubmüller competed in three more Asian F3 races for Aran Racing, achieving two podiums for a ninth place championship finish.

Asmer left the team so Grubmüller had a new team-mate for the 2008 campaign. Max Chilton joined the Austrian, and once again Grubmüller was outpaced by his team-mate. His consistency did improve over the course of the season but failed to crack the podium as his best finish was fourth, coming at the 1000 km of Monza-supporting rounds, and finished fourteenth in the championship. He was edged out by just a single point by John Martin at the final round at Donington. He impressed in Macau, finishing as top Hitech driver in eighth beating both Chilton and Roberto Merhi, who joined the team for a one-off drive.

2009 saw a great change in Grubmüller's results, and became a surprise championship contender. Hitech had originally planned to run just Grubmüller in the series, but Sam Abay was signed up in the run up to the opening round. Sadly for Hitech, Abay could not acquire a work permit for the UK, and had to return to Australia. Grubmüller achieved his first two podiums in Formula Three at that first round, at Oulton Park. Before the second round, Renger van der Zande was signed up to drive a second Hitech car, to help Grubmüller. He took his first win at Hockenhim, before adding a second win at Donington. However, Daniel Ricciardo had a significant enough lead to claim the title with a round to spare in the Algarve. Van der Zande had also moved ahead of Grubmüller in the standings, but with van der Zande returning to the Formula Three Euroseries to compete for Motopark Academy in Barcelona, Grubmüller had the chance to seal the runner-up spot, at the final round at Brands Hatch which was being held on the same weekend. Grubmüller did so with two fifth places, allowing him to overhaul his team-mate by ten points.

=== Formula Renault 3.5 Series ===
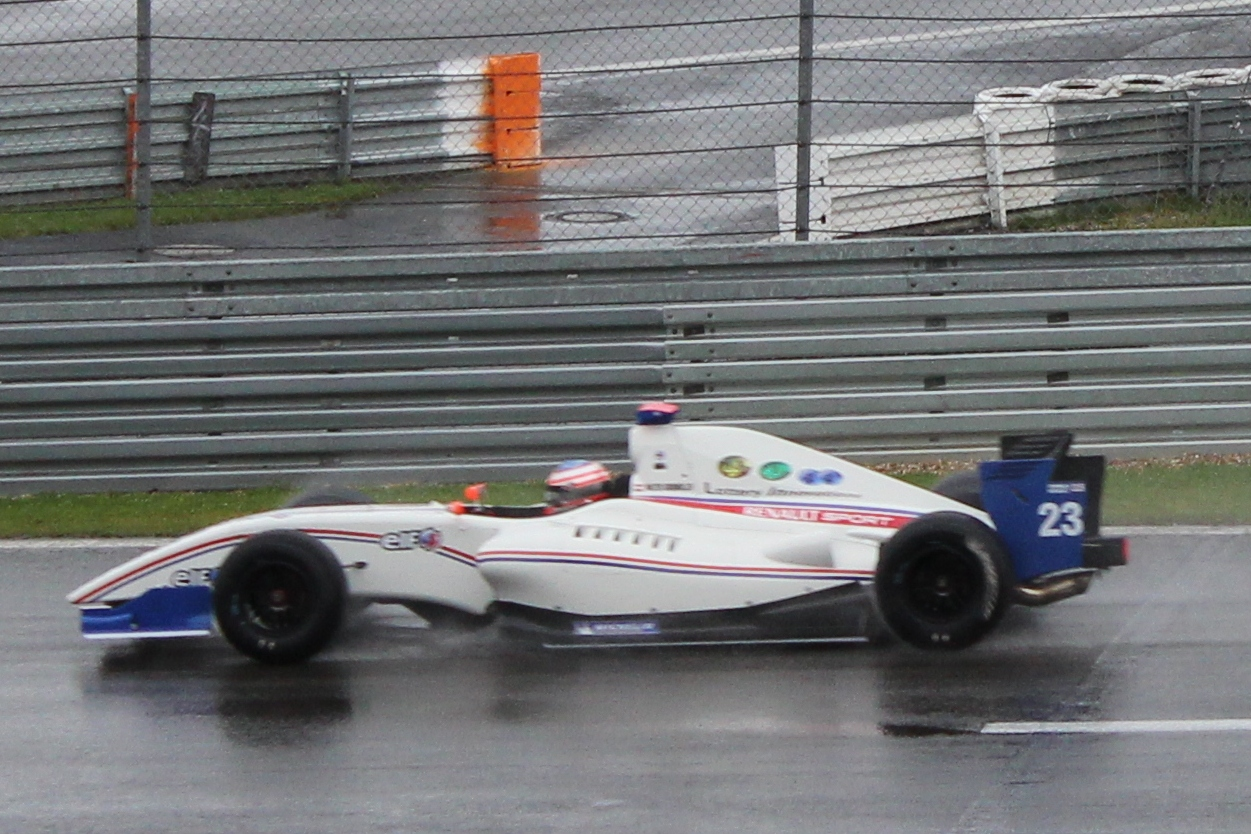
Walter Grubmüller at the 2011 Nürburgring World series by Renault round

Towards the end of 2008, Grubmüller tested a Formula Renault 3.5 Series car for the first time with leading British team P1 Motorsport at the Paul Ricard circuit in France. The relationship continued in 2009 when Grubmüller tested for the team again at Motorland Aragón and Barcelona and in January 2010, it was announced that he would drive for the team in the 2010 season, racing alongside fellow rookie Jan Charouz.

== Racing record ==
=== Karting career summary ===
Season	Series	Position
2003	CIK-FIA Karting European Championship - ICA Junior	7th
2003	Italian Open Masters - ICA Junior	24th
2003	33rd Torneo Industrie - 100 Junior	11th
2003	Tropeo Invernal Ayrton Senna - 100 Junior	9th
2003	European Central Region - ICA Junior	13th
2004	Italian Open Masters - ICA Junior	**3rd**
2004	Andrea Margutti Trophy - ICA Junior	8th
2004	9th South Garda Winter Cup - 100 Junior	7th

=== Career summary ===
Season	Series	Team	Races	Wins	Poles	F/laps	Podiums	Points	Position
2004	Formula Renault Monza	BVM Minardi Junior	4	0	0	0	0	8	23rd
2005	Eurocup Formula Renault 2.0	Jenzer Motorsport	16	0	0	0	0	0	NC
2005	Italian Formula Renault 2.0	Jenzer Motorsport	15	0	0	0	0	3	27th
2005	Italian Formula Renault 2.0 Winter Series	Jenzer Motorsport	4	0	0	0	0	12	11th
2006	Asian Formula Three Championship	JA Motorsport	3	0	0	?	0	0	NC
2006	Eurocup Formula Renault 2.0	Jenzer Motorsport	7	0	0	0	0	9	19th
2006	Eurocup Formula Renault 2.0	Twincam Motorsport	6	0	0	0	0	9	19th
2006	Italian Formula Renault 2.0	Jenzer Motorsport	12	0	0	0	0	18	20th
2007	British Formula 3 International Series	Hitech Racing	20	0	0	0	0	7	16th
2007	Masters of Formula 3	Hitech Racing	1	0	0	0	0	N/A	NC
2007	Macau Grand Prix	Hitech Racing	1	0	0	0	0	N/A	18th
2007	Australian Drivers' Championship	Astuti Motorsport	4	0	0	0	1	12	13th
2007	Asian Formula Three Championship	Aran Racing	3	0	0	?	2	26	9th
2008	British Formula 3 International Series	Hitech Racing	22	0	0	0	0	44	14th
2008	Macau Grand Prix	Hitech Racing	1	0	0	0	0	N/A	8th
2009	British Formula 3 International Series	Hitech Racing	20	2	2	1	9	188	**2nd**
2009	Masters of Formula 3	Hitech Racing	1	0	0	0	0	N/A	14th
2009	Formula Three Sudamericana	Hitech Racing	1	0	0	0	0	N/A	NC†
2010	Formula Renault 3.5 Series	P1 Motorsport	17	0	0	0	0	16	16th
2011	Formula Renault 3.5 Series	P1 Motorsport	14	0	0	0	0	24	18th
2012	Formula Renault 3.5 Series	P1 Motorsport	17	0	0	0	1	42	14th

† – As Grubmüller was a guest driver, he was ineligible for points.

=== Complete Eurocup Formula Renault 2.0 results ===
(key) (Races in bold indicate pole position; races in italics indicate fastest lap)

Year	Entrant	1	2	3	4	5	6	7	8	9	10	11	12	13	14	15	16	DC	Points
2005	Jenzer Motorsport	ZOL; 1; 24	ZOL; 2 Ret	VAL; 1 Ret	VAL; 2; 16	LMS; 1; 26	LMS; 2 Ret	BIL; 1; 21	BIL; 2; 24	OSC; 1; 16	OSC; 2; 17	DON; 1 Ret	DON; 2 Ret	EST; 1; 23	EST; 2; 13	MNZ; 1 Ret	MNZ; 2 Ret	36th	0
2006	Jenzer Motorsport	ZOL; 1; 17	ZOL; 2; 27	IST; 1; 12	IST; 2; 18	MIS; 1; 22	MIS; 2; 16	NÜR; 1 Ret	NÜR; 2 DNS	DON; 1; 5	DON; 2; 8	LMS; 1; 17	LMS; 2; 18	CAT; 1 Ret	CAT; 2; 15	19th	9		

=== Complete British Formula Three Championship results ===
(key) (Races in bold indicate pole position; races in italics indicate fastest lap)

Year	Entrant	Chassis	Engine	1	2	3	4	5	6	7	8	9	10	11	12	13	14	15	16	17	18	19	20	21	22	DC	Points
2007	Hitech Racing	Dallara F307	Mercedes	OUL; 1; 13	OUL; 2; 8	DON; 1; 14	DON; 2 Ret	BUC; 1 DNS	BUC; 2 DNS	SNE; 1; 15	SNE; 2; 13	MNZ; 1; 15	MNZ; 2 Ret	BRH; 1; 10	BRH; 2; 9	SPA; 1; 12	SPA; 2; 13	SIL; 1; 12	SIL; 2 Ret	THR; 1; 11	THR; 2 Ret	CRO; 1 Ret	CRO; 2 Ret	ROC; 1; 11	ROC; 2; 18	16th	7
2008	Hitech Racing	Dallara F308	Mercedes HWA	OUL; 1 Ret	OUL; 2; 5	CRO; 1; 14	CRO; 2; 11	MNZ; 1; 4	MNZ; 2 Ret	ROC; 1; 9	ROC; 2; 12	SNE; 1; 9	SNE; 2; 9	THR; 1; 11	THR; 2; 11	BRH; 1; 6	BRH; 2; 8	SPA; 1; 9	SPA; 2 Ret	SIL; 1; 13	SIL; 2; 11	BUC; 1; 9	BUC; 2; 6	DON; 1 Ret	DON; 2; 20	14th	44
2009	Hitech Racing	Dallara F309	Mercedes HWA	**OUL**; **1**; **3**	OUL; 2; 2	SIL1; 1; 7	SIL1; 2; 7	ROC; 1 Ret	ROC; 2; 6	HOC; 1; 3	**HOC**; **2**; **1**	SNE; 1; 4	SNE; 2; 3	DON; 1; 1	DON; 2; 3	SPA; 1 Ret	SPA; 2; 3	SIL2; 1; 2	SIL2; 2; 4	ALG; 1; 12	ALG; 2; 20	BRH; 1; 5	BRH; 2; 5			2nd	188

=== Complete Macau Grand Prix results ===
Year	Team	Car	Qualifying	Quali Race	Main race
2007	(United Kingdom) Hitech Racing	Dallara F306 (Mercedes)	27th	16th	18th
2008	(United Kingdom) Hitech Racing	Dallara F308 (Mercedes)	19th	14th	8th

=== Complete Formula Renault 3.5 Series results ===
(key) (Races in bold indicate pole position) (Races in italics indicate fastest lap)

Year	Team	1	2	3	4	5	6	7	8	9	10	11	12	13	14	15	16	17	Pos	Points
2010	P1 Motorsport	ALC; 1; 10†	ALC; 2; 8	SPA; 1; 7	SPA; 2; 18	MON; 1; 11	BRN; 1; 14	BRN; 2; 4	MAG; 1 Ret	MAG; 2; 16	HUN; 1; 11	HUN; 2; 11	HOC; 1 Ret	HOC; 2 Ret	SIL; 1 Ret	SIL; 2; 14	CAT; 1; 15	CAT; 2; 13	16th	16
2011	P1 Motorsport	ALC; 1; 7	ALC; 2; 16	SPA; 1; 12	SPA; 2; 6	MNZ; 1; 8	MNZ; 2; 13	MON; 1; 13	NÜR; 1; 12	NÜR; 2 DNS	HUN; 1	HUN; 2	SIL; 1; 9	SIL; 2; 11	LEC; 1; 12	LEC; 2 Ret	CAT; 1; 13	CAT; 2; 8	18th	24
2012	P1 Motorsport	ALC; 1; 16	ALC; 2 Ret	MON; 1; 9	SPA; 1; 8	SPA; 2; 6	NÜR; 1; 7	NÜR; 2; 15	MSC; 1 Ret	MSC; 2; 2	SIL; 1; 9	SIL; 2 Ret	HUN; 1; 20	HUN; 2; 10	LEC; 1; 13	LEC; 2; 12	CAT; 1; 13	CAT; 2; 10	14th	42

^{†} Driver did not finish the race, but was classified as he completed more than 90% of the race distance.
