= 2008 Eurocup Formula Renault 2.0 =

Motor racing competition

Seasons
- ← 2007 2009 →

The 2008 Eurocup Formula Renault 2.0 season was the eighteenth Eurocup Formula Renault 2.0 season. The season began at Circuit de Spa-Francorchamps on May 3 and finished at the Circuit de Catalunya on October 19, after fourteen rounds. Four drivers went into the final meeting with a shot of winning the title, with Valtteri Bottas coming out on top, to claim his second title in the year.

== Teams and drivers ==
2008 Entry List
Team	No.	Driver name	Class	Rounds
(Spain) Epsilon Euskadi 1	1	(United States) Jake Rosenzweig		All
(Spain) Epsilon Euskadi 1	2	(Spain) Pablo Montilla		All
(Spain) Epsilon Euskadi 1	3	(Dominican Republic) Richard Campollo		All
(France) SG Drivers Project	4	(United Arab Emirates) Ramez Azzam	J	All
(France) SG Drivers Project	5	(Russia) Anton Nebylitskiy		All
(France) SG Drivers Project	6	(France) Jean-Éric Vergne		All
(Spain) Epsilon Euskadi 2	7	(Spain) Albert Costa		All
(Spain) Epsilon Euskadi 2	8	(Spain) Roberto Merhi	J	All
(Spain) Epsilon Euskadi 2	9	(Colombia) Carlos Muñoz	J	2-7
(Germany) Motopark Academy	10	(Germany) Tobias Hegewald		All
(Germany) Motopark Academy	11	(Finland) Valtteri Bottas		All
(Germany) Motopark Academy	70	(Portugal) António Félix da Costa	J	1, 4, 6
(France) SG Formula	12	(Australia) Daniel Ricciardo		All
(France) SG Formula	14	(Italy) Andrea Caldarelli		All
(France) SG Formula	15	(France) Nelson Lukes		1-2
(France) SG Formula	15	(United Kingdom) Alexander Sims		5
(France) SG Formula	15	(Spain) Miki Monrás	J	6-7
(Italy) Prema Powerteam	16	(Colombia) Carlos Muñoz	J	1
(Italy) Prema Powerteam	16	(Spain) Víctor García	J	3
(Italy) Prema Powerteam	16	(Italy) Sergio Campana		4-7
(Italy) Prema Powerteam	17	(Italy) Sergio Campana		2-3
(Italy) Prema Powerteam	17	(Lithuania) Kazim Vasiliauskas		1, 4-7
(Italy) Prema Powerteam	18	(Italy) Patrick Reiterer		All
(Czech Republic) Krenek Motorsport	19	(Czech Republic) Adam Kout		All
(Czech Republic) Krenek Motorsport	74	(Czech Republic) Jakub Knoll	J	1
(Belgium) Boutsen Energy Racing	21	(France) Nathanaël Berthon		All
(Germany) Team Motorpark	22	(Poland) Kuba Giermaziak		All
(Germany) Team Motorpark	23	(Mexico) Juan Pablo García		All
(Germany) Team Motorpark	71	(Brazil) Vinicius Sammarone		1, 4, 6
(Italy) BVM Minardi Team	24	(Italy) Daniel Zampieri		All
(Italy) BVM Minardi Team	25	(Brazil) César Ramos		All
(Italy) BVM Minardi Team	26	(United Kingdom) Adrian Quaife-Hobbs	J	All
(Switzerland) Jenzer Motorsport	27	(Italy) Michele Faccin		All
(Switzerland) Jenzer Motorsport	28	(Norway) Pål Varhaug	J	All
(Switzerland) Jenzer Motorsport	29	(Spain) Siso Cunill		1-3
(Switzerland) Jenzer Motorsport	29	(Switzerland) Christopher Zanella		4
(Switzerland) Jenzer Motorsport	29	(Portugal) Luís Santos		6
(Spain) iQuick	30	(Spain) Miguel Otegui	J	All
(Spain) iQuick	31	(Spain) Himar Acosta		1-2, 4-5
(Spain) iQuick	31	(Denmark) Johan Jokinen		6-7
(Spain) Amiter Galuppo Sport	32	(Spain) Marcelo Conchado		1-2, 5-7
(France) Epsilon Sport	33	(France) Tristan Vautier		1
(France) Epsilon Sport	33	(Netherlands) Paul Meijer		3-4
(France) Epsilon Sport	33	(France) Bastien Borget	J	5
(France) Epsilon Sport	34	(France) Bastien Borget	J	3
(France) Epsilon Sport	34	(France) Mathieu Arzeno		1-2, 5-7
(France) Epsilon Sport	35	(Monaco) Stéphane Richelmi		1-5
(United Kingdom) Hitech Junior Team	36	(United Kingdom) Richard Singleton		All
(United Kingdom) Hitech Junior Team	37	(Spain) Miki Monrás	J	1-5
(United Kingdom) Hitech Junior Racing	38	(United Kingdom) Luciano Bacheta		All
(United Kingdom) Hitech Junior Racing	39	(Colombia) Juan Jacobo	J	All
(Croatia) RB Racing Team	40	(Croatia) Dino Butorac		1-5, 7
(United Kingdom) Fortec Motorsport	41	(United Kingdom) Dean Smith		All
(United Kingdom) Fortec Motorsport	42	(United Kingdom) Daniel McKenzie		All
(United Kingdom) Fortec Competition	43	(Brazil) Gabriel Dias		1-6
(United Kingdom) Fortec Competition	44	(United Kingdom) Alex Morgan		All
(France) TCS Racing	45	(France) Nicolas Marroc		1-5
(Switzerland) Race Performance	66	(Switzerland) Christopher Zanella^{1}		3
(Netherlands) MP Motorsport	75	(Netherlands) Paul Meijer		1
(Netherlands) MP Motorsport	76	(Netherlands) Nicky Catsburg		1
(Netherlands) MP Motorsport	77	(Poland) Mateusz Adamski	J	1
(France) Pole Services	78	(France) Benjamin Lariche		2

Icon	Class
J	Junior Class

== Calendar ==
Round		Circuit	Date	Pole position	Fastest lap	Winning driver	Winning team
1	R1	(Belgium) Circuit de Spa-Francorchamps	3 May	(Finland) Valtteri Bottas	(Australia) Daniel Ricciardo	(Australia) Daniel Ricciardo	(France) SG Formula
1	R2	(Belgium) Circuit de Spa-Francorchamps	4 May	(Finland) Valtteri Bottas	(Italy) Daniel Zampieri	(Netherlands) Paul Meijer	(Netherlands) MP Motorsport
2	R1	(United Kingdom) Silverstone Circuit	7 June	(Finland) Valtteri Bottas	(France) Mathieu Arzeno	(Finland) Valtteri Bottas	(Germany) Motopark Academy
2	R2	(United Kingdom) Silverstone Circuit	8 June	(Finland) Valtteri Bottas	(Australia) Daniel Ricciardo	(Australia) Daniel Ricciardo	(France) SG Formula
3	R1	(Hungary) Hungaroring	5 July	(Australia) Daniel Ricciardo	(Australia) Daniel Ricciardo	(Australia) Daniel Ricciardo	(France) SG Formula
3	R2	(Hungary) Hungaroring	6 July	(Australia) Daniel Ricciardo	(Australia) Daniel Ricciardo	(Australia) Daniel Ricciardo	(France) SG Formula
4	R1	(Germany) Nürburgring	30 August	(Spain) Roberto Merhi	(Finland) Valtteri Bottas	(Spain) Roberto Merhi	(Spain) Epsilon Euskadi
4	R2	(Germany) Nürburgring	31 August	(Finland) Valtteri Bottas	(Finland) Valtteri Bottas	(Finland) Valtteri Bottas	(Germany) Motopark Academy
5	R1	(France) Bugatti Circuit, Le Mans	6 September	(Spain) Roberto Merhi	(Spain) Roberto Merhi	(Spain) Roberto Merhi	(Spain) Epsilon Euskadi
5	R2	(France) Bugatti Circuit, Le Mans	7 September	(Finland) Valtteri Bottas	(Finland) Valtteri Bottas	(Finland) Valtteri Bottas	(Germany) Motopark Academy
6	R1	(Portugal) Autódromo do Estoril	27 September	(Australia) Daniel Ricciardo	(Spain) Albert Costa	(Australia) Daniel Ricciardo	(France) SG Formula
6	R2	(Portugal) Autódromo do Estoril	28 September	(Finland) Valtteri Bottas	(Finland) Valtteri Bottas	(Finland) Valtteri Bottas	(Germany) Motopark Academy
7	R1	(Spain) Circuit de Catalunya, Barcelona	18 October	(Australia) Daniel Ricciardo	(United Kingdom) Richard Singleton	(Finland) Valtteri Bottas	(Germany) Motopark Academy
7	R2	(Spain) Circuit de Catalunya, Barcelona	19 October	(Australia) Daniel Ricciardo	(Australia) Daniel Ricciardo	(Australia) Daniel Ricciardo	(France) SG Formula

== Championship standings ==
=== Drivers ===
Points are awarded to the drivers as follows:

Position	1	2	3	4	5	6	7	8	9	10	PP*
Points	15	12	10	8	6	5	4	3	2	1	1

* - only awarded to race one polesitters

Pos	Driver	SPA (Belgium)		SIL (United Kingdom)		HUN (Hungary)		NÜR (Germany)		LMS (France)		EST (Portugal)		CAT (Spain)		Pts
Pos	Driver	1	2	3	4	5	6	7	8	9	10	11	12	13	14	Pts
1	(Finland) Valtteri Bottas	3	27	1	2	Ret	13	2	1	3	1	3	1	1	4	139
2	(Australia) Daniel Ricciardo	1	4	4	1	1	1	3	5	Ret	6	1	10	6	1	136
3	(Italy) Andrea Caldarelli J	2	Ret	2	3	2	2	5	3	2	2	8	12	3	2	123
4	(Spain) Roberto Merhi J	7	Ret	3	5	3	6	1	2	1	3	2	7	8	28†	108
5	(Germany) Tobias Hegewald	11	5	10	6	6	3	4	6	5	8	6	Ret	2	5	72
6	(France) Jean-Éric Vergne	10	24	38†	8	4	4	6	27	7	5	4	Ret	12	3	53
7	(Brazil) César Ramos	6	2	24	Ret	5	9	25	10	4	7	18	Ret	Ret	11	38
8	(Spain) Albert Costa	5	Ret	8	Ret	7	5	30	4	Ret	4	34	15	Ret	Ret	35
9	(Italy) Michele Faccin	8	8	6	4	23	7	15	15	13	16	14	9	4	12	33
10	(France) Mathieu Arzeno	9	Ret	5	7					Ret	Ret	NC	Ret	5	6	23
11	(Netherlands) Paul Meijer	Ret	1			11	8	8	38							21
12	(Italy) Daniel Zampieri	4	3	14	Ret	13	10	21	Ret	Ret	12	Ret	DNS	10	15	20
13	(Portugal) António Félix da Costa J	16	9					10	9			5	4			19
14	(United Kingdom) Alex Morgan	13	Ret	7	Ret	DNQ	DNQ	11	8	22	17	11	3	11	17	17
15	(Norway) Pål Varhaug J	14	7	13	12	8	12	28	20	14	20	12	5	13	7	17
16	(United Kingdom) Richard Singleton	41	14	23	37†	32	29	Ret	14	12	13	9	2	28	9	16
17	(United Kingdom) Dean Smith	12	Ret	18	16	29	Ret	7	12	Ret	10	10	6	17	Ret	11
18	(Poland) Kuba Giermaziak	22	Ret	25	25	10	31	9	7	Ret	Ret	13	8	14	27	10
19	(United Kingdom) Alexander Sims									6	9					7
20	(Russia) Anton Nebylitskiy	24	Ret	16	22	Ret	Ret	Ret	Ret	Ret	15	26	17	7	8	7
21	(Spain) Miki Monrás J	19	11	30	24	12	22	14	Ret	16	27	7	Ret	9	Ret	6
22	(Spain) Siso Cunill	Ret	6	12	13	Ret	17									5
23	(United Kingdom) Luciano Bacheta	15	18	35	36	31†	Ret	17	Ret	8	11	Ret	NC	Ret	18	3
24	(Brazil) Gabriel Dias	36	23	9	10	Ret	11	18	21	15	14	Ret	18			3
25	(Italy) Sergio Campana			21	29	9	14	19	11	21	29	15	14	Ret	13	2
26	(United Kingdom) Adrian Quaife-Hobbs J	Ret	Ret	11	9	14	19	29	24	Ret	Ret	16	Ret	Ret	14	2
27	(Italy) Patrick Reiterer	23	Ret	31	27	24	18	Ret	22	9	Ret	20	Ret	19	21	2
28	(United States) Jake Rosenzweig	18	Ret	37	28	20	16	13	18	10	18	22	29†	24	10	2
29	(France) Tristan Vautier	25	10													1
30	(Czech Republic) Adam Kout	20	12	22	18	21	25	24	37†	11	28	25	23	22	Ret	0
31	(Spain) Himar Acosta	40†	21	15	11			16	16	DNQ	DNQ					0
32	(Mexico) Juan Pablo García	21	17	36	34	18	21	20	25	Ret	21	30	11	26	Ret	0
33	(France) Nathanaël Berthon	39†	20	27	30	26	23	12	19	17	25	24	Ret	23	24	0
34	(Colombia) Carlos Muñoz J	28	25	29	20	Ret	24	Ret	13	19	19	Ret	13	16	26	0
35	(Monaco) Stéphane Richelmi	17	13	39†	15	Ret	15	34†	23	DNQ	DNQ					0
36	(United Kingdom) Daniel McKenzie	26	19	19	14	DNQ	DNQ	32	31	20	23	19	19	15	19	0
37	(United Arab Emirates) Ramez Azzam J	32	15	17	23	16	20	Ret	26	Ret	DNS	21	24	18	20	0
38	(Spain) Víctor García J					15	Ret									0
39	(Denmark) Johan Jokinen											17	16	20	Ret	0
40	(Lithuania) Kazim Vasiliauskas	33	Ret					33	28	Ret	22	27	20	Ret	16	0
41	(Netherlands) Nicky Catsburg	34	16													0
42	(France) Bastien Borget J					17	Ret			Ret	24					0
43	(Switzerland) Christopher Zanella ^{1}					25	26	31	17							0
44	(France) Benjamin Lariche			26	17											0
45	(France) Nicolas Marroc	31	22	28	Ret	27	27	Ret	29	18	Ret					0
46	(Dominican Republic) Richard Campollo	42†	29	20	19	30†	NC	22	32	DNQ	DNQ	33†	22	25	Ret	0
47	(Spain) Miguel Otegui J	Ret	Ret	33	26	19	30	Ret	33	Ret	Ret	29	25	Ret	22	0
48	(Spain) Pablo Montilla	37	Ret	32	21	22	Ret	26	34	Ret	26	Ret	26	Ret	23	0
49	(Colombia) Juan Esteban Jacobo J	30	Ret	34	32	28	28	27	35	DNQ	DNQ	23	28	21	25	0
50	(Brazil) Vinicius Sammarone	Ret	28					23	30			32†	21			0
51	(Poland) Mateusz Adamski J	29	26													0
52	(Portugal) Luís Santos											28	27			0
53	(Spain) Marcelo Conchado	35	31	40	33					DNQ	30	31	Ret	27	Ret	0
54	(France) Nelson Lukes	27	Ret	Ret	31											0
55	(Czech Republic) Jakub Knoll J	Ret	30													0
56	(Croatia) Dino Butorac	38	Ret	41	35	DNQ	DNQ	Ret	36	DNQ	DNQ			DNQ	DNQ	0
Pos	Driver	SPA (Belgium)		SIL (United Kingdom)		HUN (Hungary)		NÜR (Germany)		LMS (France)		EST (Portugal)		CAT (Spain)		Pts

† — Drivers did not finish the race, but were classified as they completed over 90% of the race distance.

- ^1 Christopher Zanella race as guest driver with Race Performance at the Hungaroring.

=== Teams ===
Pos	Team	Points
1	(France) SG Formula	259
2	(Germany) Motopark Academy	220
3	(Spain) Epsilon Euskadi 2	143
4	(France) SG Drivers Project	60
5	(Switzerland) Jenzer Motorsport	50
6	(Italy) BVM Minardi Team	54
7	(United Kingdom) Fortec Competition	53
8	(France) Epsilon Sport	44
9	(United Kingdom) Hitech Junior Team	16
10	(Netherlands) MP Motorsport	15
11	(France) TCS Racing	11
12	(United Kingdom) Fortec Motorsport	11
13	(Germany) Team Motopark	10
14	(Italy) Prema Powerteam	4
15	(United Kingdom) Hitech Junior Racing	3
16	(Spain) Epsilon Euskadi 1	2
