= Nicolas Marroc =

French racing driver

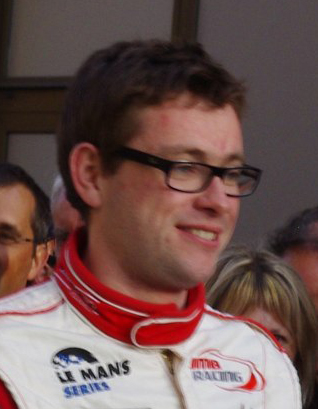
- Marroc at the 2011 24 Hours of Le Mans driver parade
- Nationality: (France) French
- Born: 5 December 1986 (age 39) La Roche-sur-Yon (France)
- Categorisation: FIA Silver

Previous series
- 2010 2010 2009 2009 2008 2007–08 2007 2006: Formula 3 Euro Series; Italian Formula Three; British Formula 3 German Formula Three; Formula Renault 2.0 WEC; Eurocup Formula Renault 2.0; French Formula Renault 2.0; Formula Campus

Nicolas Marroc (born 5 December 1986 in La Roche-sur-Yon) is a French former racing driver.

== Career ==
=== Formula Renault Campus France ===
Marroc began his formula racing career in the 2006 Championnat de France FFSA Formule Campus Renault Elf season. He finished ninth overall in the championship, taking seven point-scoring positions from thirteen races including one podium at Lédenon, scoring 44 points.

=== Formula Renault ===
In 2007, Marroc participated in the Championnat de France Formula Renault 2.0 with Pole Services and TCS Racing, but was not classified. In the Eurocup, he was a guest driver at Magny-Cours and Barcelona.

The following season, Marroc competed in both the Eurocup Formula Renault 2.0 and Formula Renault 2.0 West European Cup championships for TCS Racing. He failed to score a point in the Eurocup standings. In the West European Cup, he took 28th place in the championship, scoring one point thanks to a tenth place at Le Mans.

=== Formula Three ===
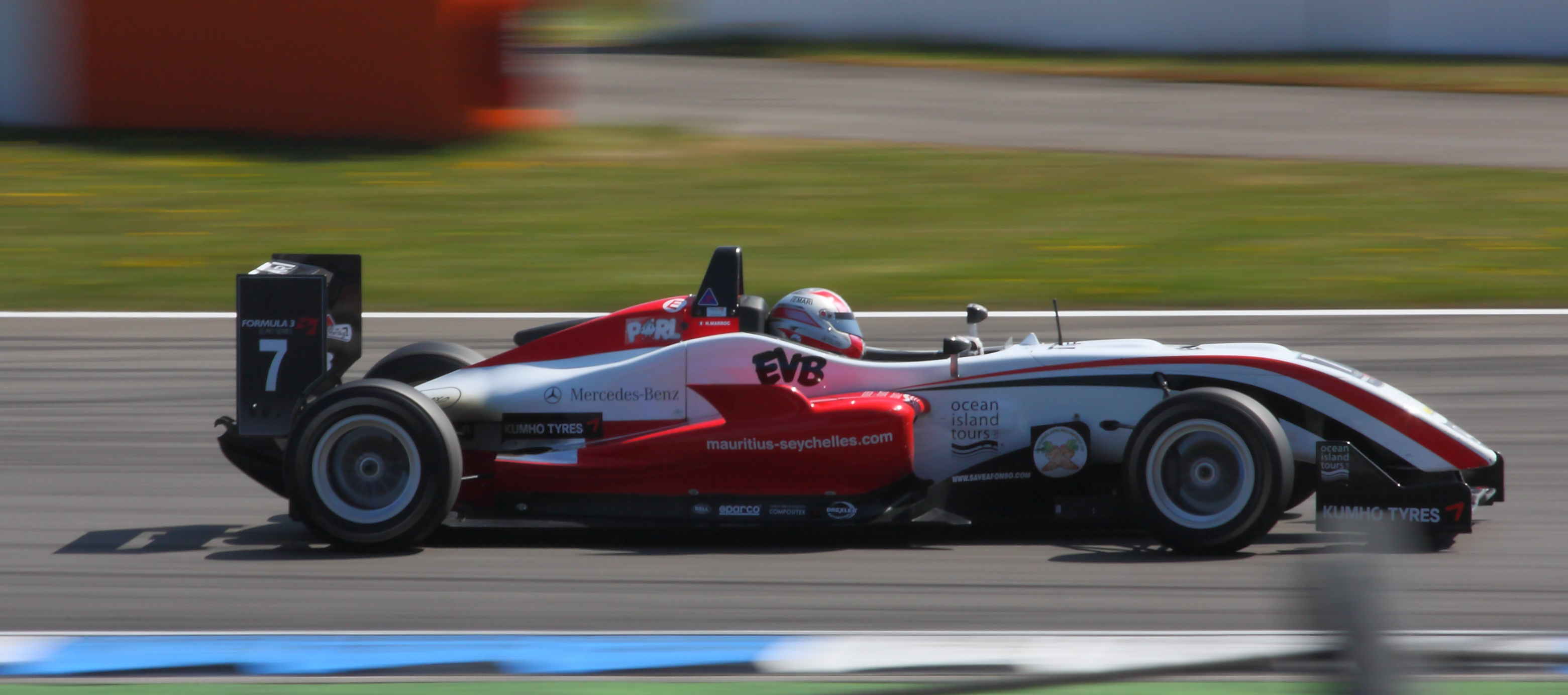
Marroc competing at the second round of the 2010 Formula 3 Euro Series at Hockenheim.

In 2009, Marroc stepped up to the German Formula Three Championship with the Racing Experience team. He finished twelfth in the standings after taking six point-scoring positions from eighteen races. Also he appeared as a guest driver in British Formula 3 at Spa, guesting in the National Class.

2010 saw Marroc move to the Formula 3 Euro Series, competing for Prema Powerteam and joining Daniel Juncadella at the team.

== Racing record ==
=== Career summary ===
Season	Series	Team	Races	Wins	Poles	F/Laps	Podiums	Points	Position
2006	Formule Campus Renault Elf	Formule Campus	13	0	0	0	1	44	9th
2007	Championnat de France Formula Renault 2.0	TCS Racing	13	0	0	0	0	0	NC
2007	Championnat de France Formula Renault 2.0	Pole Services	13	0	0	0	0	0	NC
2007	Eurocup Formula Renault 2.0	TCS Racing	4	0	0	0	0	N/A	NC†
2008	Formula Renault 2.0 Eurocup	TCS Racing	10	0	0	0	0	0	45th
2008	Formula Renault 2.0 WEC	TCS Racing	7	0	0	0	0	1	27th
2009	German Formula Three	Racing Experience	18	0	0	0	0	14	12th
2009	British Formula 3 National Class	Racing Experience	2	0	0	0	1	N/A	NC†
2010	Formula 3 Euro Series	Prema Powerteam	6	0	0	0	0	10	11th

† – As Marroc was a guest driver, he was ineligible for points.

=== Complete Eurocup Formula Renault 2.0 results ===
(key) (Races in bold indicate pole position; races in italics indicate fastest lap)

Year	Entrant	1	2	3	4	5	6	7	8	9	10	11	12	13	14	DC	Points
2007	TCS Racing	ZOL; 1	ZOL; 2	NÜR; 1	NÜR; 2	HUN; 1	HUN; 2	DON; 1	DON; 2	MAG; 1; 28	MAG; 2 Ret	EST; 1	EST; 2	CAT; 1; 30	CAT; 2; 30	NC†	0
2008	TCS Racing	SPA; 1; 31	SPA; 2; 22	SIL; 1; 28	SIL; 2 Ret	HUN; 1; 27	HUN; 2; 27	NÜR; 1 Ret	NÜR; 2; 29	LMS; 1; 18	LMS; 2 Ret	EST; 1	EST; 2	CAT; 1	CAT; 2	45th	0

† As Marroc was a guest driver he was ineligible for points

=== Complete Formula 3 Euro Series results ===
(key)

Year	Entrant	Chassis	Engine	1	2	3	4	5	6	7	8	9	10	11	12	13	14	15	16	17	18	DC	Points
2010	Prema Powerteam	Dallara F308/047	Mercedes	LEC; 1; 11	LEC; 2; 10	HOC1; 1; 10	HOC1; 2; 13	VAL; 1; 8	VAL; 2; 2	NOR; 1; 11	NOR; 2; 10	NÜR; 1; 9	NÜR; 2; 8	ZAN; 1; 13	ZAN; 2; 12	BRH; 1; 12	BRH; 2; 11	OSC; 1; 10	OSC; 2; 3	HOC2; 1 Ret	HOC2; 2; 8	11th	10

=== 24 Hours of Le Mans results ===
Year	Team	Co-Drivers	Car	Class	Laps	Pos.	Class Pos.
2011	(Monaco) JMB Racing	(France) Manuel Rodrigues (France) Jean-Marc Menahem	Ferrari F430 GTE	GTE; Am	272	27th	4th

=== Complete GP2 Final results ===
(key) (Races in bold indicate pole position) (Races in italics indicate fastest lap)

Year	Entrant	1	2	DC	Points
2011	Ocean Racing Technology	YMC; FEA; 14	YMC; SPR; 22	18th	0
