= Hywel Lloyd =

British racing driver

- Nationality: British
- Born: 14 March 1985 (age 41) Corwen (Wales)

British Formula 3 career
- Debut season: 2009
- Current team: CF Racing with Manor
- Car number: 25
- Starts: 22
- Wins: 0
- Poles: 0
- Fastest laps: 0
- Best finish: 13th in 2009

Previous series
- 2008 2006–07 2006–07 2006: British F3 National Class; FRUK Winter Series; BARC Formula Renault; Formula Renault UK

Championship titles
- 2007: BARC Formula Renault

Hywel Lloyd (born 14 March 1985 in Corwen, Wales) is a racing driver, He formerly drove in the British Formula 3 Championship for his family-run CF Racing team. Lloyd won the 2007 BARC Formula Renault Championship, before moving to the main championship.

Sporting positions
Preceded by Richard Singleton	Formula Renault BARC; Champion; 2007	Succeeded by Ollie Hancock
