= Gabriel Dias (racing driver) =

Brazilian racing driver

- Nationality: Brazilian
- Born: July 11, 1990 (age 36)

British Formula 3 Championship career
- Debut season: 2009
- Current team: Hitech Racing
- Car number: 4

Previous series
- 2008 2008: Formula Renault 2.0 WEC; Formula Renault 2.0 Eurocup

Gabriel Dias (born July 11, 1990) is a Brazilian racing driver. In 2010, he competed in the British Formula 3 Championship.
