= Henry Fitzalan-Howard, Earl of Arundel =

British racing driver

Earl of Arundel
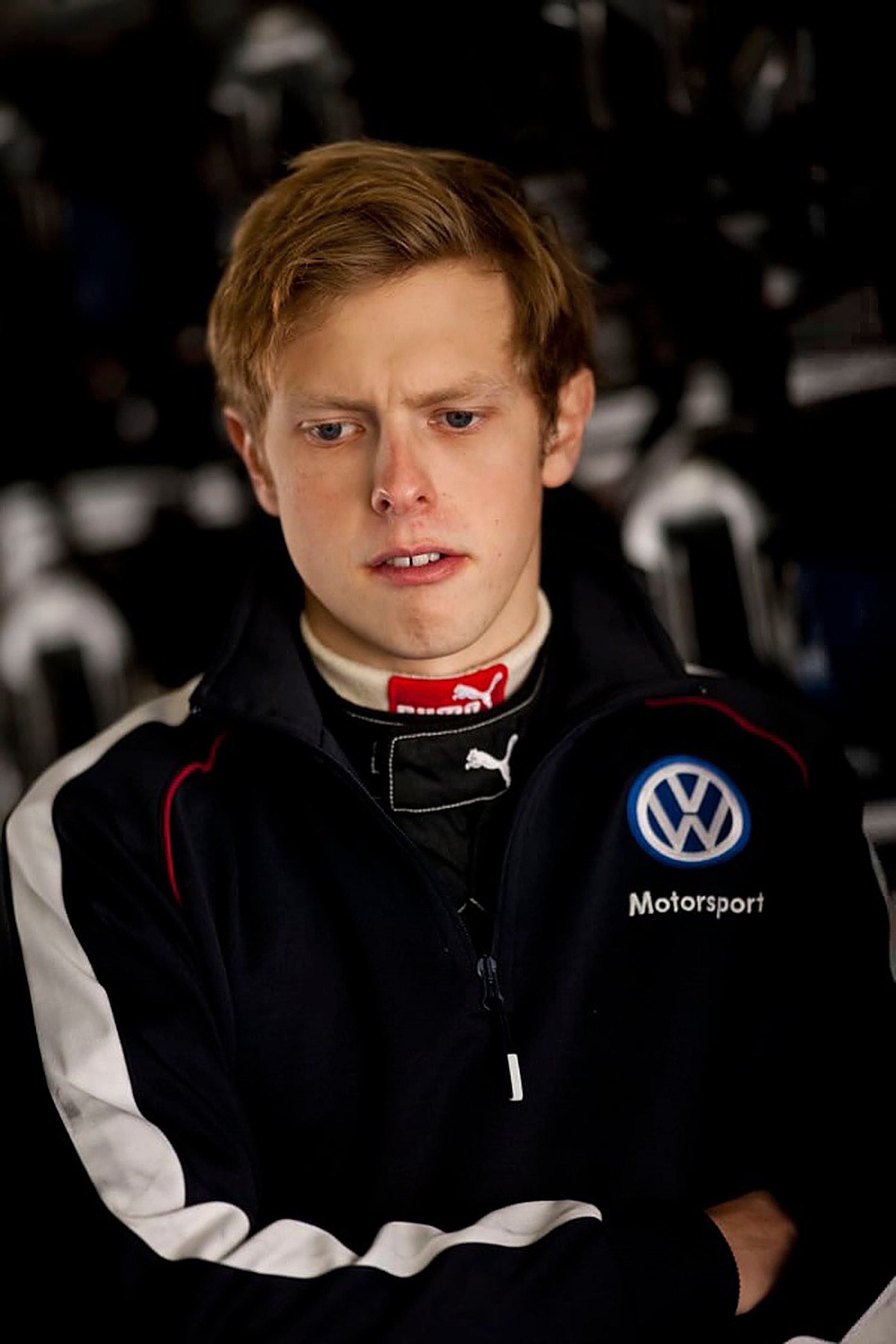
- Pictured at the 2009 British Formula 3 International Series
- Born: Henry Miles Fitzalan-Howard; 3 December 1987 (age 38); London, England
- Other name: Henry Arundel
- Occupation: Businessman
- Title: Earl of Arundel (by courtesy)
- Spouse: Cecilia Colacicchi (m. 2016)
- Children: Lady Flora Fitzalan-Howard; Lady Eliza Fitzalan-Howard; Lady Serena Fitzalan-Howard
- Parents: Edward Fitzalan-Howard, 18th Duke of Norfolk; Georgina Gore
- Family: Howard family

British Formula 3 Championship
- Years active: 2008–2009
- Teams: Carlin Motorsport (2009)
- Car number: 2
- Former teams: Räikkönen Robertson Racing (2008)
- Best finish: 9th overall in 2009

Previous series
- 2006–2007: Formula BMW UK

Henry Miles Fitzalan-Howard, Earl of Arundel (born 3 December 1987), styled as Lord Maltravers until 2002 and known professionally as Henry Arundel, is a British aristocrat, businessman and former motor racing driver. He is heir apparent to the dukedom of Norfolk, the most senior peerage in the Peerage of England, and the family seat of Arundel Castle.

== Life and career ==
He was born on 3 December 1987 to Edward, Earl of Arundel, later 18th Duke of Norfolk, and his wife Georgina Gore. He had the courtesy title of Lord Maltravers from birth but upon the death in 2002 of his paternal grandfather, Miles, 17th Duke of Norfolk, he assumed his current courtesy title of Earl of Arundel. From 2007 to 2010, he studied at the University of Bristol and graduated with an Honours Bachelor of Science degree in economics.

Between 2010 and 2019, he worked in various private equity and corporate finance roles in London at NM Rothschild, Evercore Partners and then Inflexion Private Equity. In 2019, he co-founded Noble Insurance Group, where he serves as a managing director. His other interests include skiing, hiking and climbing.

=== Motor racing ===
In 2006, under the name Henry Arundel, he competed in the Formula BMW UK Championship, driving for Fortec Motorsport and winning the Rookie Cup. He was elected to the Motor Sports Association Race Elite Scheme in April 2007, along with five other drivers in various British series. He remained with the Fortec Motorsport team during the 2007 Formula BMW UK season and placed third overall.

In 2008, he raced for Räikkönen Robertson Racing in the British Formula 3 Championship. He scored 21 points and finished 15th in the standings. He raced for Carlin Motorsport during the 2009 British Formula 3 season. He scored 90 points and finished ninth in the standings.

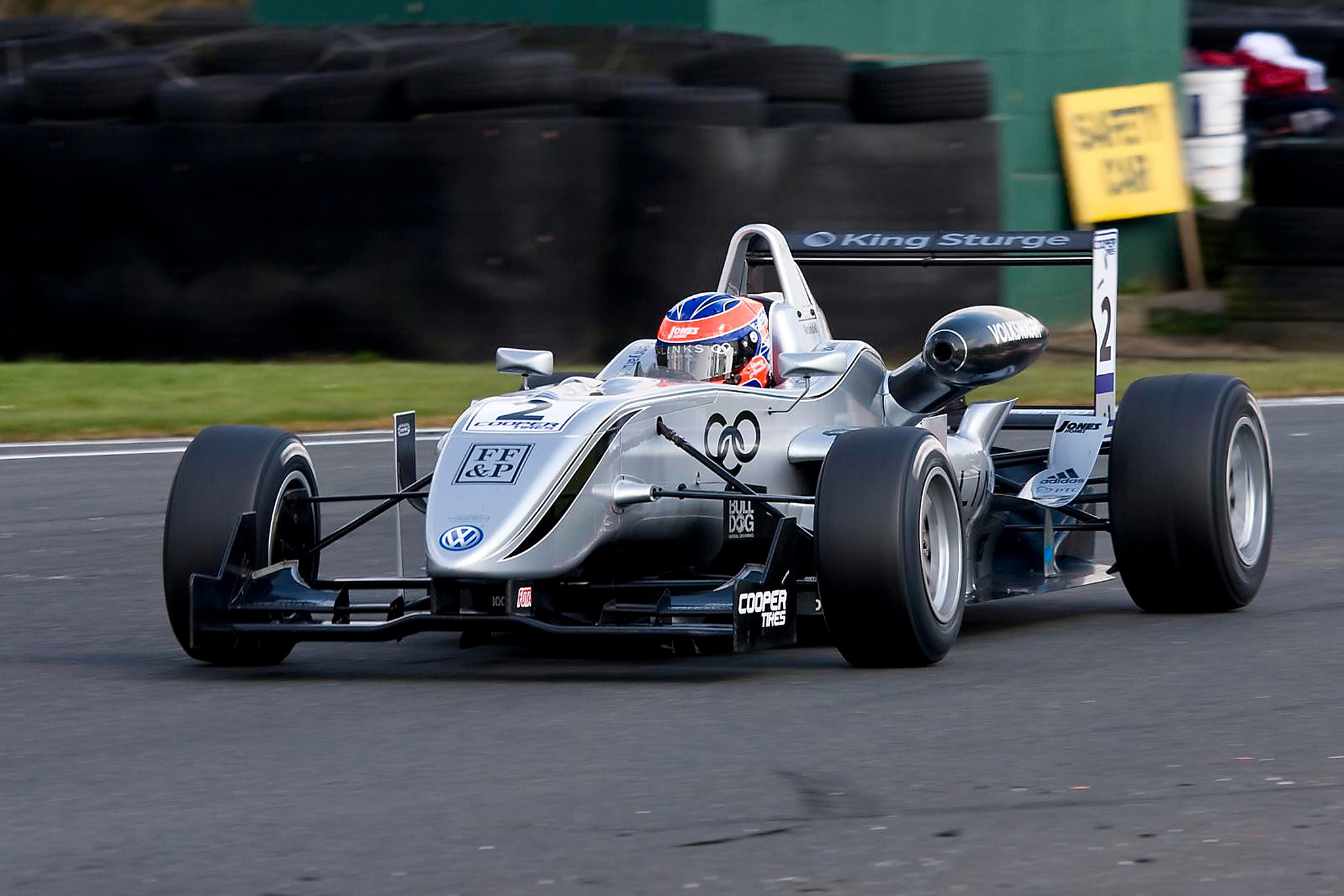
Volkswagen Dallara F308 driven by Arundel in British F3 testing at Oulton Park in March 2008

== Marriage and family ==
On 16 July 2016, he married Cecilia Colacicchi (born 1988) at Arundel Cathedral. They have three daughters:

- Lady Flora Mary Isabella Fitzalan-Howard (born 10 November 2018)
- Lady Eliza Rachel Fitzalan-Howard (born 12 May 2020)
- Lady Serena Elena Rose Fitzalan-Howard (born 7 June 2023)

Court offices
Preceded by Lord Eskdaill	Page of Honour; 1999–2002	Succeeded by Archibald Young
Preceded by The Marquess of Reading	United Kingdom Order of Precedence (gentlemen)	Succeeded by Sebastian Seymour, Lord Seymour
