= Jay Bridger =

British racing driver

- Nationality: (United Kingdom) British
- Born: 23 September 1987 (age 39) Kent
- Debut season: 2006

British Formula Three Championship
- Teams: Bridger Motorsport
- Car number: 50
- Former teams: Fluid Motorsport Development; Team West-Tec; Litespeed F3
- Starts: 131
- Wins: 8
- Poles: 10
- Fastest laps: 10
- Best finish: 1st in 2010

Previous series
- 2008–2012 2006–2007: British F3; British Formula Ford Championship

Championship titles
- 2008: British F3 National Class

Jay Bridger (born 1987) is a British racing driver.

Bridger began racing in karts at the age of eight, winning four karting championships before starting his professional career in British Formula Ford in 2006.

He finished fifth in the championship in 2007 and finished sixth in the Duratec class at the Formula Ford Festival and tenth in the Walter Hayes Trophy. In 2008, he moved to the British Formula Three Championship and won the National Class. He moved to the main championship in 2009 and finished 15th in points. In 2010, he improved to 14th overall.

He now runs his own team, Bridger Motorsport, as well as racing part-time.
