= 2007 Formula Renault 2.0 UK Championship =

Seasons
- ← 2006 2008 →

The 2007 Formula Renault 2.0 UK Championship was the 19th British Formula Renault Championship season. The season began at Brands Hatch on March 31 and finished at Thruxton on October 14, after twenty rounds. The championship was won by Duncan Tappy with Adam Christodoulou winning the Graduate Cup.

== Teams and drivers ==
Team	No.	Driver name	Class	Rounds
Fortec Motorsports	1	(Japan) Ryuji Yamamoto		All
Fortec Motorsports	2	(United Kingdom) Dean Smith		All
Fortec Motorsports	4	(United Kingdom) Riki Christodoulou	G	All
Fortec Motorsports	23	(United Kingdom) Duncan Tappy		All
Manor Competition	3	(United Kingdom) Richard Singleton	G	1-4
Manor Competition	3	(United States) Joe D'Agostini		9
Manor Competition	11	(United Kingdom) Alex Morgan		All
Manor Competition	22	(United Kingdom) Alexander Sims	G	All
Manor Competition	35	(United Kingdom) Kris Loane	G	All
AKA Cobra Racing	5	(United Kingdom) Adam Christodoulou	G	All
AKA Cobra Racing	6	(United Kingdom) Jeremy Metcalfe		All
AKA Cobra Racing	7	(United Kingdom) Chris Holmes		All
AKA Cobra Racing	8	(Australia) Nathan Caratti		All
Eurotek Motorsport	9	(United Kingdom) Jordan Oakes	G	All
Mark Burdett Motorsport	10	(United Kingdom) Paul Rees		5-10
Mark Burdett Motorsport	25	(Sweden) Daniel Ivarsson		All
Mark Burdett Motorsport	26	(Japan) Sho Hanawa	G	All
Apotex Scorpio Motorsport	20	(United Kingdom) Will Bratt		All
Apotex Scorpio Motorsport	32	(United Kingdom) Richard Keen		2, 5-6
Apotex Scorpio Motorsport	32	(United Kingdom) David Epton		3–4, 7-10
Borthwick Motorsport	21	(United Kingdom) Ryan Borthwick	G	All
Carlin Motorsport	24	(United Kingdom) Henry Surtees	G	10
Eucatex	34	(Brazil) Adriano Buzaid		All
Hillspeed Racing	88	(United Kingdom) Richard Singleton		5-10
AMR	99	(United Kingdom) Andy Meyrick		10

Icon	Class
G	Graduate Cup

== Calendar ==
All races held in United Kingdom.

Round	Circuit	Date	Pole position	Fastest lap	Winning driver	Winning team
1	Brands Hatch Indy	April 1	(United Kingdom) Jeremy Metcalfe	(United Kingdom) Dean Smith	(United Kingdom) Jeremy Metcalfe	AKA Cobra Racing
2	Brands Hatch Indy	April 1	(United Kingdom) Duncan Tappy	(United Kingdom) Duncan Tappy	(United Kingdom) Duncan Tappy	Fortec Motorsport
3	Rockingham	April 22	(United Kingdom) Dean Smith	(United Kingdom) Dean Smith	(United Kingdom) Duncan Tappy	Fortec Motorsport
4	Rockingham	April 22	(United Kingdom) Duncan Tappy	(United Kingdom) Duncan Tappy	(United Kingdom) Duncan Tappy	Fortec Motorsport
5	Thruxton	May 6	(United Kingdom) Dean Smith	(United Kingdom) Riki Christodoulou	(United Kingdom) Dean Smith	Fortec Motorsport
6	Thruxton	May 6	(United Kingdom) Adam Christodoulou	(United Kingdom) Dean Smith	(United Kingdom) Dean Smith	Fortec Motorsport
7	Croft	June 2	(United Kingdom) Will Bratt	(United Kingdom) Duncan Tappy	(United Kingdom) Will Bratt	Apotex Scorpio Motorsport
8	Croft	June 3	(United Kingdom) Will Bratt	(United Kingdom) Dean Smith	(United Kingdom) Will Bratt	Apotex Scorpio Motorsport
9	Oulton Park	June 23	(United Kingdom) Dean Smith	(United Kingdom) Dean Smith	(United Kingdom) Will Bratt	Apotex Scorpio Motorsport
10	Oulton Park	June 24	(United Kingdom) Dean Smith	(United Kingdom) Dean Smith	(United Kingdom) Jeremy Metcalfe	AKA Cobra Racing
11	Donington Park	July 15	(United Kingdom) Dean Smith	(United Kingdom) Alexander Sims	(United Kingdom) Alexander Sims	Manor Competition
12	Donington Park	July 15	(United Kingdom) Dean Smith	(United Kingdom) Duncan Tappy	(United Kingdom) Dean Smith	Fortec Motorsport
13	Snetterton	July 29	(United Kingdom) Dean Smith	(United Kingdom) Duncan Tappy	(United Kingdom) Duncan Tappy	Fortec Motorsport
14	Snetterton	July 29	(United Kingdom) Duncan Tappy	(United Kingdom) Dean Smith	(United Kingdom) Duncan Tappy	Fortec Motorsport
15	Brands Hatch Indy	August 19	(United Kingdom) Duncan Tappy	(United Kingdom) Duncan Tappy	(United Kingdom) Duncan Tappy	Fortec Motorsport
16	Brands Hatch Indy	August 19	(United Kingdom) Duncan Tappy	(United Kingdom) Will Bratt	(United Kingdom) Will Bratt	Apotex Scorpio Motorsport
17	Donington Park GP	September 9	(United Kingdom) Duncan Tappy	(United Kingdom) Dean Smith	(United Kingdom) Duncan Tappy	Fortec Motorsport
18	Donington Park GP	September 9	(United Kingdom) Duncan Tappy	(United Kingdom) Duncan Tappy	(United Kingdom) Duncan Tappy	Fortec Motorsport
19	Thruxton	October 14	(United Kingdom) Adam Christodoulou	(United Kingdom) Duncan Tappy	(United Kingdom) Duncan Tappy	Fortec Motorsport
20	Thruxton	October 14	(United Kingdom) Adam Christodoulou	(United Kingdom) Duncan Tappy	(United Kingdom) Riki Christodoulou	Fortec Motorsport

== Championship standings ==
Points are awarded to the drivers as follows:

Position	1	2	3	4	5	6	7	8	9	10	11	12	13	14	15	16	17	18	19	20	FL
Points	32	28	25	22	20	18	16	14	12	11	10	9	8	7	6	5	4	3	2	1	2

Best 18 results count towards the championship.

- T. Pts—points if all races counted.
- Drop—two dropped scores.
- Pts—best 18 results.
- G. Pts—drivers in the Graduate Cup, with the best 15 results counting.

Pos	Driver	(England) BHI		(England) ROC		(England) THR		(England) CRO		(England) OUL		(England) DON		(England) SNE		(England) BHI		(England) DGP		(England) THR		Points
Pos	Driver	1	2	3	4	5	6	7	8	9	10	11	12	13	14	15	16	17	18	19	20	Points
1	(United Kingdom) Duncan Tappy	2	1	1	1	3	2	3	4	5	2	4	3	1	1	1	EX	1	1	1	3	512
2	(United Kingdom) Dean Smith	4	3	2	3	1	1	2	2	2	4	2	1	11	2	14	5	3	3	3	4	491
3	(United Kingdom) Will Bratt	6	15	3	Ret	4	6	1	1	1	6	5	2	3	4	8	1	6	4	4	8	416
4	(United Kingdom) Adam Christodoulou (G)	3	2	5	6	5	4	5	6	6	3	11	6	2	6	4	2	9	7	12	2	384
5	(United Kingdom) Jeremy Metcalfe	1	6	4	11	8	3	Ret	7	Ret	1	7	16	10	3	11	3	7	5	5	7	333
6	(United Kingdom) Riki Christodoulou (G)	7	4	9	2	2	11	4	3	14	9	3	Ret	Ret	Ret	12	6	2	2	Ret	1	324
7	(United Kingdom) Richard Singleton (G)	8	5	6	8	9	5	6	8	4	5	6	4	4	5	5	8	8	Ret	15	10	313
8	(United Kingdom) Alexander Sims (G)	Ret	7	7	12	11	NC	Ret	5	18	8	1	5	13	9	2	Ret	4	8	2	6	272
9	(United Kingdom) Alex Morgan	11	12	15	14	13	14	11	15	12	15	12	10	7	8	9	12	5	6	10	14	193
10	(United Kingdom) Chris Holmes	5	8	12	Ret	17	13	8	10	7	19	9	8	8	Ret	17	4	Ret	9	9	17	192
11	(United Kingdom) Kris Loane (G)	13	16	Ret	17	10	17	13	9	13	13	16	9	5	10	7	7	12	12	6	13	188
12	(Brazil) Adriano Buzaid	Ret	10	Ret	5	Ret	8	12	Ret	3	16	10	14	6	14	3	16	Ret	DNS	EX	11	166
13	(United Kingdom) Jordan Oakes (G)	10	9	11	16	6	12	15	11	11	11	19	12	12	13	6	10	13	Ret	Ret	Ret	166
14	(Japan) Ryuji Yamamoto	Ret	11	8	7	16	Ret	Ret	DNS	15	12	15	Ret	9	7	13	13	14	11	7	5	163
15	(Japan) Sho Hanawa (G)	12	13	14	13	15	10	Ret	14	16	14	8	11	14	12	19	14	17	13			128
16	(United Kingdom) David Epton					7	7	9	12					Ret	11	18	9	11	10	8	9	125
17	(Australia) Nathan Caratti	9	14	Ret	10	18	9	7	13	9	7	18	Ret	16	Ret	15	Ret	Ret	Ret	Ret	12	120
18	(United Kingdom) Ryan Borthwick (G)	15	18	10	9	12	16	10	Ret	8	Ret	14	15	17	Ret	16	14	15	Ret	14	15	119
19	(Sweden) Daniel Ivarsson	14	17	16	15	14	15	14	16	17	17	17	13	Ret	15	10	11	16	Ret	16	19	106
20	(United Kingdom) Richard Keen			13	4					10	10	13	7									76
21	(United Kingdom) Paul Rees									19	18	Ret	Ret	15	Ret	20	15	Ret	14	Ret	16	29
22	(United Kingdom) Henry Surtees (G)																			11	18	13
23	(United States) Joe D'Agostini																	10	Ret			11
24	(United Kingdom) Andy Meyrick																			13	Ret	8

Pos	Team	Points(1)
1	Fortec Motorsport	1078
2	AKA Cobra	786
3	Apotec Scorpio Motorsport	621
4	Manor Competition	620
5	Mark Burdett Motorsport	242
6	Eurotek Motorsport	198
7	Hillspeed Racing	189
8	Eucatex	166
9	Borthwick Motorsport	119
10	Carlin Motorsport	13
11	AMR	8

- (1) = Points include all drivers results except fastest laps extra points.
