= Adriano Buzaid =

Brazilian racing driver

- Nationality: (Brazil) Brazilian
- Born: July 5, 1988 (age 38) São Paulo (Brazil)

British Formula 3 career
- Debut season: 2009
- Current team: Carlin
- Car number: 1
- Former teams: T-Sport
- Starts: 47
- Wins: 10
- Poles: 10
- Fastest laps: 8
- Best finish: 4th in 2010

Previous series
- 2008 2007–08 2006–07 2006: British F3 National Class; Formula Renault 2.0 UK; FR2.0 UK Winter Series; Formula Ford UK

Adriano Buzaid (born July 5, 1988) is a former Brazilian racing driver and currently founder and CEO of GoHobby, a leading Brazilian technology company that specializes in importing and distributing advanced drones and urban air mobility solutions

== Career ==
=== Formula Ford ===
Having been a finalist in IndyCar Series driver Tony Kanaan's Stock Car Junior selections, Buzaid moved to the UK to compete in the 2006 British Formula Ford Championship for Eau Rouge Motorsport. Buzaid finished eleventh in the championship, including a win at Rockingham.

=== Formula Renault ===
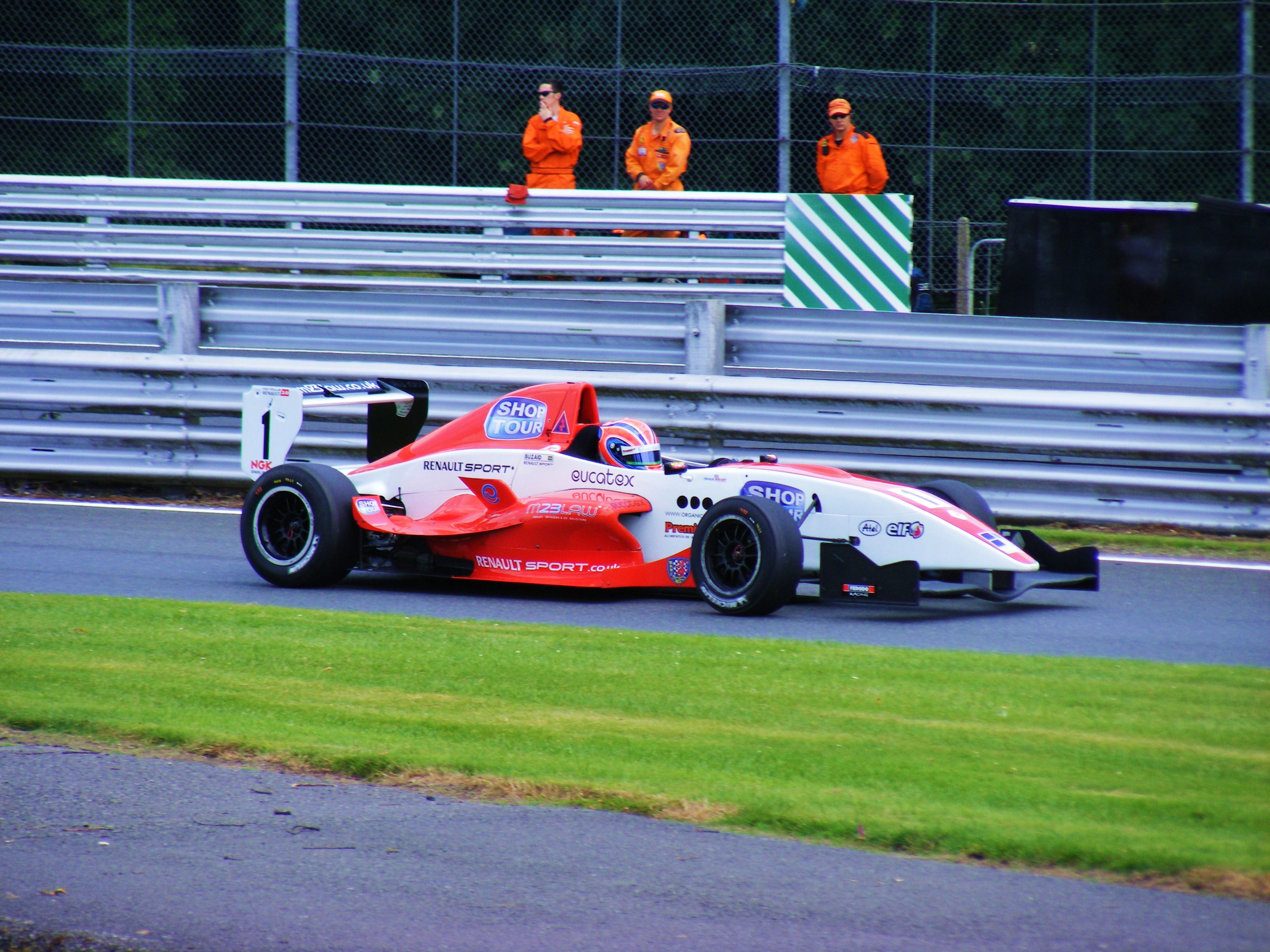
Buzaid competing during the 2008 Formula Renault UK season at Oulton Park.

Buzaid signed with AKA Lemac for the 2006 Formula Renault 2.0 UK Winter Series, as a precursor to a possible deal for the 2007 series. Buzaid teamed up with Adam Christodoulou and Jon Lancaster, and ended up seventh with a best result of second coming in the final race at Croft. Buzaid signed for Eucatex for the main series campaign in 2007, and recorded two podiums en route to 13th in the championship. A second winter series campaign followed with Fortec Motorsport, and Buzaid again ended seventh, including a win at the final race at Croft.

Buzaid remained in Formula Renault for the 2008 Formula Renault UK season, and continued with Fortec. Buzaid set six pole positions, five fastest laps, and scored five wins as he ended up a highly creditable third place in the championship. He was also only one of four drivers to finish every race in the season, along with Alexander Sims, Oliver Webb and Kieren Clark.

=== Formula Three ===
After Andrew Meyrick's illness ruled him out of the rest of the season, Buzaid was called up by Carlin Motorsport to contest the final round of the British Formula 3 Championship at Donington Park. Buzaid finished third and fourth in class giving him 22 points for the weekend.

Buzaid stepped up to the International Class with T-Sport for the 2009 British Formula 3 season, partnering 2008 British Formula Ford champion Wayne Boyd. After teammate Boyd won his first race at Donington Park, Buzaid took his first win (and pole position) the following week at Spa. That was his final top-five finish of the season, as he amassed just ten points in the final six races, finishing sixth in the championship.

Buzaid will stayed in the series for the 2010 season, moving across to Carlin.

Buzaid finished fourth overall in the 2010 British Formula 3 season, being the strongest driver in the last part of the championship in points, had taken seven successive podiums in the last nine races, winning in Silverstone and Snetterton (two pole positions, one lap record).

== Racing record ==
=== Career summary ===
| Season | Series | Team name | Races | Wins | Poles | FLaps | Podiums | Points | Position |
|---|---|---|---|---|---|---|---|---|---|
| 2006 | British Formula Ford Championship | Eau Rouge Motorsport | 17 | 1 | 0 | 1 | 1 | 186 | 13th |
| 2006 | Formula Renault UK Winter Series | AKA Lemac | 4 | 0 | 0 | 0 | 1 | 58 | 7th |
| 2007 | Formula Renault UK | Eucatex | 20 | 0 | 0 | 0 | 2 | 166 | 13th |
| 2007 | Formula Renault UK Winter Series | Fortec Motorsport | 4 | 1 | 1 | 0 | 1 | 56 | 7th |
| 2008 | Formula Renault UK | Fortec Motorsport | 20 | 5 | 6 | 5 | 7 | 418 | 3rd |
| 2008 | Formula Renault 2.0 Italia Winter Cup | BVM Minardi Team | 2 | 0 | 0 | 0 | 0 | 18 | 10th |
| 2008 | British Formula 3 National Class | Carlin Motorsport | 2 | 0 | 0 | 0 | 1 | 22 | 13th |
| 2009 | British Formula 3 | T-Sport | 20 | 1 | 1 | 0 | 5 | 109 | 6th |
| 2010 | British Formula 3 | Carlin Motorsport | 30 | 2 | 2 | 1 | 10 | 238 | 4th |
| 2023 | BOSS GP - Formula Class | MM International Motorsport | 2 | 1 | 1 | 1 | 2 | 49 | 11th |
