= 2008 British Formula 3 International Series =

Seasons
- ← 2007 2009 →

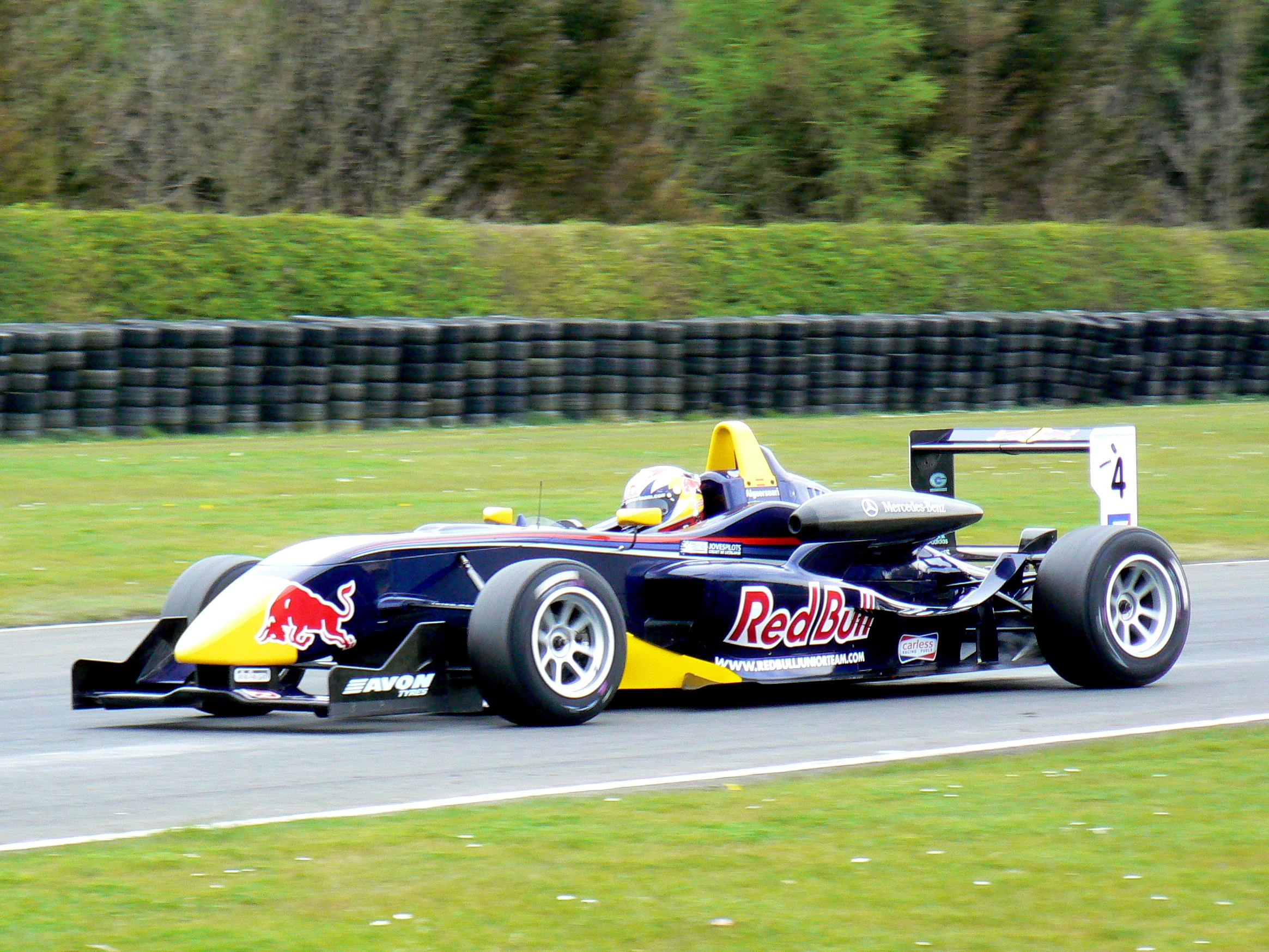
The Drivers' Championship was won by Spanish driver Jaime Alguersuari.

The 2008 Formula 3 International Series was the 58th British Formula 3 International Series season. It began on 24 March 2008 at Oulton Park's Easter Monday meeting and ended on 12 October at Donington Park after 22 rounds in four countries. Jay Bridger sealed the National Class championship at the Bucharest meeting, with a third place in round nineteen. The overall championship went down to the final meeting as Oliver Turvey, Jaime Alguersuari, Brendon Hartley and Sergio Pérez all had a chance of winning the title, however it was Alguersuari that won the title, thanks to a double win at Donington.

The scoring system was 20-15-12-10-8-6-4-3-2-1 points awarded to the first ten finishers, with one extra point added to the driver who set the fastest lap of the race. If a Class B driver or a guest driver finished among the top finishers, he would not score points for the main championship, and the points would be awarded to the next driver in the standings.

Three events (six rounds) were held outside the United Kingdom: Monza, Spa-Francorchamps and Bucharest.

== Drivers and teams ==
Team	Chassis	Engine	No	Driver	Rounds
Championship Class
(United Kingdom) Hitech Racing	Dallara F308	Mercedes HWA	1	(United Kingdom) Max Chilton	All
(United Kingdom) Hitech Racing	Dallara F308	Mercedes HWA	2	(Austria) Walter Grubmüller	All
(United Kingdom) Carlin Motorsport	Dallara F308	Mercedes HWA	3	(New Zealand) Brendon Hartley	All
(United Kingdom) Carlin Motorsport	Dallara F308	Mercedes HWA	4	(Spain) Jaime Alguersuari	All
(United Kingdom) Carlin Motorsport	Dallara F308	Mercedes HWA	17	(United Kingdom) Oliver Turvey	All
(United Kingdom) Carlin Motorsport	Dallara F308	Mercedes HWA	18	(Australia) Sam Abay	All
(United Kingdom) Nexa Racing	Dallara F308	Mugen-Honda	5	(Iceland) Viktor Jensen	2–7
(United Kingdom) Räikkönen Robertson Racing	Dallara F308	Mercedes HWA	6	(United Kingdom) Henry Arundel	All
(United Kingdom) Räikkönen Robertson Racing	Dallara F308	Mercedes HWA	24	(Australia) John Martin	All
(United Kingdom) Räikkönen Robertson Racing	Dallara F308	Mercedes HWA	25	(United Kingdom) Alistair Jackson	1–2
(United Kingdom) Räikkönen Robertson Racing	Dallara F308	Mercedes HWA	25	(Brazil) Clemente de Faria, Jr.	9
(United Kingdom) Räikkönen Robertson Racing	Dallara F308	Mercedes HWA	26	(Finland) Atte Mustonen	All
(United Kingdom) Fortec Motorsport	Dallara F308	Mercedes HWA	7	(Sweden) Sebastian Hohenthal	1–8
(United Kingdom) Fortec Motorsport	Dallara F308	Mercedes HWA	7	(United Kingdom) Dean Smith	11
(United Kingdom) Fortec Motorsport	Dallara F308	Mercedes HWA	8	(Sweden) Marcus Ericsson	All
(United Kingdom) Fortec Motorsport	Dallara F308	Mercedes HWA	14	(Canada) Philip Major	All
(United Kingdom) T-Sport	Dallara F308	Mugen-Honda	9	(Mexico) Sergio Pérez	All
(United Kingdom) Ultimate Motorsport	Mygale M-08F3	Mercedes	11	(Argentina) Esteban Guerrieri	1–3, 10
(United Kingdom) Ultimate Motorsport	Mygale M-08F3	Mercedes	11	(United Kingdom) Alistair Jackson	4–9
(United Kingdom) Ultimate Motorsport	Mygale M-08F3	Mercedes	12	(Angola) Ricardo Teixeira	1–10
(United Kingdom) Ultimate Motorsport	Mygale M-08F3	Mercedes	13	(Republic of Ireland) Michael Devaney	1–4
(United Kingdom) Ultimate Motorsport	Mygale M-08F3	Mercedes	16	(Republic of Ireland) Michael Devaney	5–10
(United Kingdom) Eurotek Motorsport	Dallara F308	Mercedes HWA	15	(United Kingdom) Oliver Oakes	2, 8
(United Kingdom) JTR with Marshall Westland	Mygale M-08F3	Mercedes HWA	28	(United Kingdom) Nick Tandy	1–9, 11
National Class
(United Kingdom) Carlin Motorsport	Dallara F305	Mugen-Honda	42	(United Kingdom) Henry Surtees	11
(United Kingdom) Carlin Motorsport	Dallara F305	Mugen-Honda	43	(Brazil) Adriano Buzaid	11
(United Kingdom) Carlin Motorsport	Dallara F305	Mugen-Honda	54	(Iceland) Kristján Einar	1–10
(United Kingdom) Carlin Motorsport	Dallara F305	Mugen-Honda	56	(United Kingdom) Andrew Meyrick	1–6
(United Kingdom) Carlin Motorsport	Dallara F305	Mugen-Honda	56	(United Kingdom) Martin O'Connell	7
(United Kingdom) Fluid Motorsport	Dallara F307	Mugen-Honda	50	(United Kingdom) Jay Bridger	All
(United Kingdom) Fluid Motorsport	Dallara F307	Mugen-Honda	51	(United Kingdom) Stefan Wilson	All
(United Kingdom) C F Racing	Dallara F306	Mugen-Honda	52	(United Kingdom) Hywel Lloyd	All
(United Kingdom) T-Sport	Dallara F306	Mugen-Honda	53	(Colombia) Steven Guerrero	All
(United Kingdom) T-Sport	Dallara F306	Mugen-Honda	57	(Bahrain) Salman Al Khalifa	1–10
(United Kingdom) T-Sport	Dallara F306	Mugen-Honda	57	(United Kingdom) Callum MacLeod	11
(United Kingdom) Nexa Racing	Dallara F306	Mugen-Honda	55	(Germany) Craig Reiff	1–4, 8–9
(United Kingdom) Team Loctite	Dallara F306	Mugen-Honda	58	(Republic of Ireland) Niall Quinn	1–2, 4
(United Kingdom) Team Loctite	Dallara F306	Mugen-Honda	59	(United Kingdom) Jordan Williams	5–7
(United Kingdom) Litespeed F3	SLC R1	Mugen-Honda	60	(United Kingdom) Callum MacLeod	5
(United Kingdom) Litespeed F3	SLC R1	Mugen-Honda	61	(United Kingdom) Jonathan Legris	7, 9, 11
Invitation Entries
(Italy) Ombra Racing	Dallara F308	Mugen-Honda	71	(Italy) Matteo Chinosi	3
(Italy) Ombra Racing	Dallara F308	Mugen-Honda	72	(Italy) Federico Leo	3
(Austria) HBR Motorsport	Dallara F308	Mercedes HWA	73	(Spain) Daniel Campos-Hull	8
(Austria) HBR Motorsport	Dallara F308	Mercedes HWA	74	(Lebanon) Basil Shaaban	8
(Brazil) Cesario Formula	Dallara F308	Mugen-Honda	84	(Brazil) Clemente de Faria, Jr.	11
(United Kingdom) Eurotek Motorsport	Dallara F308	Mercedes HWA	85	(United Kingdom) Oliver Oakes	9–11

=== Driver changes ===
- Following the departure of Marko Asmer, who joined BMW Sauber as the team's test driver, Hitech Racing brought in 16-year-old British driver Max Chilton as the Estonian's replacement. Austrian Walter Grubmüller remains with the team.
- Carlin Motorsport did not retain any of its drivers from the previous year, instead hiring Red Bull backed Brendon Hartley and Jaime Alguersuari. Brit Oliver Turvey, who has been an A1 Grand Prix rookie driver for A1 Team Great Britain, and Australian Sam Abay, also a race winner but at Formula BMW level, take the remaining seats in the Championship Class.
- Unlike the previous year, Carlin also entered two cars in the lower national class level, Kristján Einar and Andrew Meyrick will drive them.
- Räikkönen Robertson Racing retained Finn Atte Mustonen with Henry Arundel, Alistair Jackson and John Martin taking the remaining three seats.
- Both Mansell brothers, Greg and Leo, left the team at the end of 2007. They were replaced by Marcus Ericsson, who won the final British Formula BMW Championship the previous year with Fortec, and fellow Formula BMW champion Philip Major. Sebastian Hohenthal retains his spot at the team.
- T-Sport retain 2007 National Class winner Sergio Pérez who has been promoted to Championship class. Steven Guerrero and Salman Al-Khalifa, the latter having experience in the championship, take up T-Sport's vacant national class seats.
- Ultimate Motorsport, the only team to use the Mygale chassis, retain experienced Esteban Guerrieri and Michael Devaney, both have a total of eight seasons of Formula Three between them. Angolan Ricardo Teixeira joins the team from Performance Racing.

== Calendar ==
Round	Circuit	Date	Pole position	Fastest lap	Winning driver	Winning team	National Class Winner
1	(United Kingdom) Oulton Park	24 March	(Spain) Jaime Alguersuari	(Australia) John Martin	(United Kingdom) Oliver Turvey	(United Kingdom) Carlin Motorsport	(United Kingdom) Andrew Meyrick
2	(United Kingdom) Oulton Park	24 March	(Spain) Jaime Alguersuari	(Spain) Jaime Alguersuari	(Spain) Jaime Alguersuari	(United Kingdom) Carlin Motorsport	(United Kingdom) Andrew Meyrick
3	(United Kingdom) Croft	27 April	(Sweden) Marcus Ericsson	(United Kingdom) Max Chilton	(Mexico) Sergio Pérez	(United Kingdom) T-Sport	(United Kingdom) Andrew Meyrick
4	(United Kingdom) Croft	27 April	(New Zealand) Brendon Hartley	(Mexico) Sergio Pérez	(New Zealand) Brendon Hartley	(United Kingdom) Carlin Motorsport	(United Kingdom) Andrew Meyrick
5	(Italy) Monza	17 May	(Italy) Matteo Chinosi	(Argentina) Esteban Guerrieri	(Mexico) Sergio Pérez	(United Kingdom) T-Sport	(United Kingdom) Hywel Lloyd
6	(Italy) Monza	18 May	(United Kingdom) Max Chilton	(Argentina) Esteban Guerrieri	(Mexico) Sergio Pérez	(United Kingdom) T-Sport	(United Kingdom) Jay Bridger
7	(United Kingdom) Rockingham	26 May	(United Kingdom) Max Chilton	(Spain) Jaime Alguersuari	(Finland) Atte Mustonen	(United Kingdom) Räikkönen Robertson Racing	(United Kingdom) Andrew Meyrick
8	(United Kingdom) Rockingham	26 May	(Spain) Jaime Alguersuari	(United Kingdom) Oliver Turvey	(Sweden) Sebastian Hohenthal	(United Kingdom) Fortec Motorsport	(United Kingdom) Andrew Meyrick
9	(United Kingdom) Snetterton	8 June	(Republic of Ireland) Michael Devaney	(Sweden) Marcus Ericsson	(Republic of Ireland) Michael Devaney	(United Kingdom) Ultimate Motorsport	(United Kingdom) Jay Bridger
10	(United Kingdom) Snetterton	8 June	(New Zealand) Brendon Hartley	(Spain) Jaime Alguersuari	(Republic of Ireland) Michael Devaney	(United Kingdom) Ultimate Motorsport	(United Kingdom) Stefan Wilson
11	(United Kingdom) Thruxton	29 June	(Spain) Jaime Alguersuari	(Sweden) Marcus Ericsson	(New Zealand) Brendon Hartley	(United Kingdom) Carlin Motorsport	(United Kingdom) Andrew Meyrick
12	(United Kingdom) Thruxton	29 June	(New Zealand) Brendon Hartley	(United Kingdom) Oliver Turvey	(New Zealand) Brendon Hartley	(United Kingdom) Carlin Motorsport	(Colombia) Steven Guerrero
13	(United Kingdom) Brands Hatch	13 July	(Spain) Jaime Alguersuari	(Spain) Jaime Alguersuari	(Spain) Jaime Alguersuari	(United Kingdom) Carlin Motorsport	(United Kingdom) Jay Bridger
14	(United Kingdom) Brands Hatch	13 July	(Sweden) Marcus Ericsson	(Sweden) Marcus Ericsson	(Mexico) Sergio Pérez	(United Kingdom) T-Sport	(Colombia) Steven Guerrero
15	(Belgium) Spa-Francorchamps	1 August	(United Kingdom) Oliver Turvey	(New Zealand) Brendon Hartley	(United Kingdom) Oliver Turvey	(United Kingdom) Carlin Motorsport	(United Kingdom) Stefan Wilson
16	(Belgium) Spa-Francorchamps	2 August	(United Kingdom) Oliver Turvey	(New Zealand) Brendon Hartley	(New Zealand) Brendon Hartley	(United Kingdom) Carlin Motorsport	(United Kingdom) Jay Bridger
17	(United Kingdom) Silverstone	16 August	(United Kingdom) Oliver Turvey	(United Kingdom) Oliver Turvey	(United Kingdom) Oliver Turvey	(United Kingdom) Carlin Motorsport	(United Kingdom) Stefan Wilson
18	(United Kingdom) Silverstone	16 August	(New Zealand) Brendon Hartley	(United Kingdom) Oliver Turvey	(United Kingdom) Oliver Turvey	(United Kingdom) Carlin Motorsport	(United Kingdom) Hywel Lloyd
19	(Romania) Bucharest	23 August	(New Zealand) Brendon Hartley	(Sweden) Marcus Ericsson	(New Zealand) Brendon Hartley	(United Kingdom) Carlin Motorsport	(Bahrain) Salman Al Khalifa
20	(Romania) Bucharest	24 August	(United Kingdom) Oliver Turvey	(New Zealand) Brendon Hartley	(Spain) Jaime Alguersuari	(United Kingdom) Carlin Motorsport	(United Kingdom) Stefan Wilson
21	(United Kingdom) Donington Park	12 October	(Spain) Jaime Alguersuari	(Spain) Jaime Alguersuari	(Spain) Jaime Alguersuari	(United Kingdom) Carlin Motorsport	(United Kingdom) Henry Surtees
22	(United Kingdom) Donington Park	12 October	(United Kingdom) Oliver Oakes	(New Zealand) Brendon Hartley	(Spain) Jaime Alguersuari	(United Kingdom) Carlin Motorsport	(United Kingdom) Jay Bridger

== Standings ==
Pos	Driver	OUL (United Kingdom)		CRO (United Kingdom)		MNZ (Italy)		ROC (United Kingdom)		SNE (United Kingdom)		THR (United Kingdom)		BRH (United Kingdom)		SPA (Belgium)		SIL (United Kingdom)		BUC (Romania)		DON (United Kingdom)		Pts
1	(Spain) Jaime Alguersuari	Ret	1	6	5	12	6	3	2	2	3	Ret	3	1	4	3	4	5	6	3	1	1	1	251
2	(United Kingdom) Oliver Turvey	1	12	8	3	3	13	6	9	4	5	3	2	2	3	1	Ret	1	1	2	2	3	Ret	234
3	(New Zealand) Brendon Hartley	Ret	4	Ret	1	2	Ret	10	8	3	Ret	1	1	8	Ret	2	1	2	9	1	3	2	Ret	208
4	(Mexico) Sergio Pérez	7	13	1	2	1	1	5	13	Ret	4	7	4	4	1	6	2	4	4	Ret	Ret	Ret	3	195
5	(Sweden) Marcus Ericsson	6	2	5	Ret	7	7	2	10	6	8	2	Ret	5	Ret	7	5	3	2	11	12	8	7	141
6	(Finland) Atte Mustonen	3	7	4	4	Ret	3	1	4	8	6	6	Ret	3	2	10	Ret	10	5	7	Ret	7	18	138
7	(Sweden) Sebastian Hohenthal	8	3	2	7	Ret	Ret	7	1	5	2	5	6	Ret	6	Ret	8							105
8	(Republic of Ireland) Michael Devaney	4	8	16	Ret	Ret	10	12	5	1	1	9	5	10	9	8	Ret	11	8	10	5			91
9	(United Kingdom) Nick Tandy	NC	Ret	Ret	6	Ret	5	14	6	7	22	8	Ret	7	5	23	3	9	3			6	2	86
10	(United Kingdom) Max Chilton	2	14	22	10	Ret	4	4	3	16	7	14	12	Ret	10	17	10	7	10	6	16	21	11	72
11	(Australia) Sam Abay	10	11	10	Ret	6	11	8	11	10	21	4	9	12	7	4	21	8	Ret	5	8	5	5	71
12	(Argentina) Esteban Guerrieri	5	6	3	Ret	16	2													4	4			63
13	(Australia) John Martin	11	Ret	9	21	5	9	11	14	12	11	17	7	9	18	5	Ret	6	7	8	Ret	12	12	45
14	(Austria) Walter Grubmüller	Ret	5	14	11	4	Ret	9	12	9	9	11	11	6	8	9	Ret	13	11	9	6	Ret	20	44
15	(United Kingdom) Henry Arundel	9	10	11	Ret	Ret	DNS	13	Ret	Ret	Ret	10	8	20	11	12	7	12	15	Ret	15	11	10	21
16	(United Kingdom) Dean Smith																					4	4	20
17	(United Kingdom) Alistair Jackson	13	9	7	9			Ret	Ret	13	12	Ret	16	Ret	Ret	11	19	14	Ret					9
18	(Canada) Philip Major	16	22	Ret	20	9	Ret	20	Ret	19	14	16	10	11	13	20	9	16	12	Ret	Ret	20	17	8
19	(United Kingdom) Oliver Oakes			12	Ret											13	11	22	14	14	7	13	6	1
20	(Iceland) Viktor Jensen			17	15	13	Ret	21	18	20	Ret	22	17	19	16									1
21	(Angola) Ricardo Teixeira	14	17	Ret	Ret	DSQ	17	15	15	Ret	19	Ret	Ret	13	Ret	Ret	18	Ret	13	Ret	Ret			0
22	(Brazil) Clemente de Faria, Jr.																	20	18			16	19	0
Guest drivers ineligible for points
	(Spain) Daniel Campos-Hull															Ret	6							0
	(Italy) Matteo Chinosi					8	8																	0
	(Italy) Federico Leo					14	Ret																	0
	(Lebanon) Basil Shaaban															Ret	15							0
National Class
1	(United Kingdom) Jay Bridger	15	19	15	14	Ret	12	19	16	11	13	13	14	14	15	16	12	17	17	15	11	10	8	322
2	(Colombia) Steven Guerrero	20	25	18	16	Ret	16	Ret	17	15	16	15	13	16	12	18	13	19	20	Ret	14	17	13	211
3	(United Kingdom) Hywel Lloyd	17	20	Ret	13	10	14	22	19	NC	15	19	Ret	22	20	19	16	18	16	13	10	18	16	207
4	(United Kingdom) Stefan Wilson	21	23	19	18	11	Ret	18	21	17	10	21	Ret	18	17	14	17	15	Ret	Ret	9	15	15	194
5	(United Kingdom) Andrew Meyrick	12	15	13	8	Ret	Ret	16	7	14	Ret	12	15											174
6	(Bahrain) Salman Al Khalifa	Ret	16	24	12	Ret	Ret	17	Ret	18	18	23	Ret	17	14	15	14	21	19	12	13			169
7	(Iceland) Kristján Einar	19	21	20	17	Ret	15	Ret	20	21	17	18	18	24	22	21	Ret	24	23	Ret	Ret			101
8	(Germany) Craig Reiff	22	24	23	19	15	Ret	24	Ret							22	20	23	22					51
9	(United Kingdom) Jonathan Legris													16	19			Ret	21			20	21	38
10	(Republic of Ireland) Niall Quinn	18	18	21	Ret			23	22															38
11	(United Kingdom) Henry Surtees																					9	9	35
12	(United Kingdom) Jordan Williams									Ret	20	20	19	23	21									25
13	(Brazil) Adriano Buzaid																					14	14	22
14	(United Kingdom) Callum MacLeod									22	Ret											19	Ret	9
15	(United Kingdom) Martin O'Connell													21	Ret									6
Pos	Driver	OUL (United Kingdom)		CRO (United Kingdom)		MNZ (Italy)		ROC (United Kingdom)		SNE (United Kingdom)		THR (United Kingdom)		BRH (United Kingdom)		SPA (Belgium)		SIL (United Kingdom)		BUC (Romania)		DON (United Kingdom)		Pts

Colour	Result
Gold	Winner
Silver	Second place
Bronze	Third place
Green	Points classification
Blue	Non-points classification
Blue	Non-classified finish (NC)
Purple	Retired, not classified (Ret)
Red	Did not qualify (DNQ)
Red	Did not pre-qualify (DNPQ)
Black	Disqualified (DSQ)
White	Did not start (DNS)
White	Withdrew (WD)
White	Race cancelled (C)
Blank	Did not practice (DNP)
Blank	Did not arrive (DNA)
Blank	Excluded (EX)
