= 2008 Formula Renault 2.0 UK Championship =

Motor racing competition

Seasons
- ← 2007 2009 →

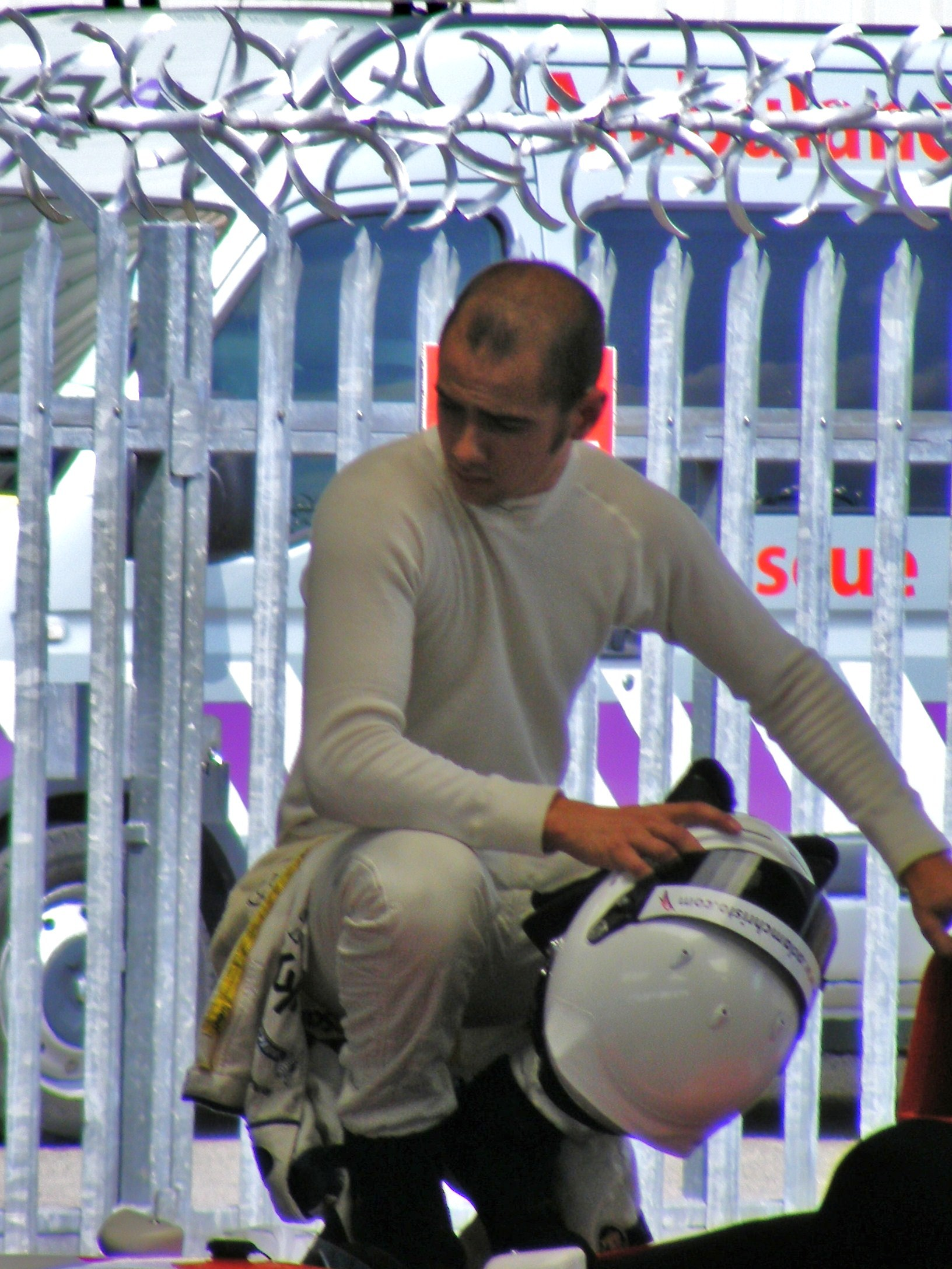
Adam Christodoulou won the title, after dropped scores.

The 2008 Formula Renault 2.0 UK Championship was the 20th British Formula Renault Championship season. The season began at Brands Hatch on March 29 and finished at the same venue on September 21, after twenty rounds. The championship was won by Adam Christodoulou with Dean Stoneman winning the Graduate Cup.

== Teams and drivers ==
Team	No.	Driver name	Class	Rounds
Fortec Motorsport	1	(Brazil) Adriano Buzaid		All
Fortec Motorsport	2	(United Kingdom) James Calado	G	All
Fortec Motorsport	8	(United Kingdom) Riki Christodoulou		All
Fortec Motorsport	9	(United Kingdom) Oli Webb	G	All
Worswick Engineering; Alpine Motorsport	3	(United Kingdom) Ross Worswick	G	All
Worswick Engineering; Alpine Motorsport	7	(United Kingdom) Dean Stoneman	G	All
CR Scuderia	5	(United Kingdom) Adam Christodoulou		All
CR Scuderia	6	(Estonia) Sten Pentus		1-6
CR Scuderia	6	(Finland) Jesse Krohn		7-9
CR Scuderia	23	(Japan) Ryuji Yamamoto		All
CR Scuderia	43	(United Kingdom) Scott Jenkins	G	All
Eurotek Motorsport	13	(United Kingdom) Jordan Oakes		All
Apotex Scorpio Motorsport	20	(United Kingdom) Kieren Clark		All
Apotex Scorpio Motorsport	21	(Japan) Sho Hanawa		1-4
Apotex Scorpio Motorsport	21	(United Kingdom) Will Bratt		6
Apotex Scorpio Motorsport	33	(South Korea) Tom Mun	G	3-10
Apotex Scorpio Motorsport	38	(Australia) Joshua Scott	G	All
Manor Competition	16	(United Kingdom) Tom Armour	G	6-10
Manor Competition	22	(United Kingdom) Alexander Sims		All
Manor Competition	24	(United Kingdom) Henry Surtees	G	All
Manor Competition	35	(United Kingdom) Kris Loane		All
Mark Burdett Motorsport	25	(Netherlands) Thomas Hylkema		All
Mark Burdett Motorsport	26	(United Kingdom) Richard Kent		1
Mark Burdett Motorsport	26	(Sweden) Fredrik Blomstedt		3-10
Mark Burdett Motorsport	27	(United Kingdom) Tom Armour	G	1-5
Mark Burdett Motorsport	27	(Finland) Jesse Krohn		6
Mark Burdett Motorsport	27	(Sweden) Daniel Ivarsson		10

Icon	Class
G	Graduate Cup

== Calendar ==
All races held in United Kingdom.

Round	Circuit	Date	Pole position	Fastest lap	Winning driver	Winning team
1	Brands Hatch	29 March	(United Kingdom) Alexander Sims	(Japan) Ryuji Yamamoto	(United Kingdom) Riki Christodoulou	Fortec Motorsport
2	Brands Hatch	30 March	(United Kingdom) Adam Christodoulou	(United Kingdom) Adam Christodoulou	(United Kingdom) Adam Christodoulou	CR Scuderia
3	Rockingham	12 April	(United Kingdom) Adam Christodoulou	(United Kingdom) Adam Christodoulou	(United Kingdom) Adam Christodoulou	CR Scuderia
4	Rockingham	13 April	(United Kingdom) Adam Christodoulou	(United Kingdom) Adam Christodoulou	(United Kingdom) Adam Christodoulou	CR Scuderia
5	Donington Park	3 May	(Brazil) Adriano Buzaid	(Brazil) Adriano Buzaid	(Brazil) Adriano Buzaid	Fortec Motorsport
6	Donington Park	4 May	(Brazil) Adriano Buzaid	(United Kingdom) Alexander Sims	(United Kingdom) Dean Stoneman	Alpine Motorsport
7	Thruxton	17 May	(United Kingdom) Adam Christodoulou	(Japan) Ryuji Yamamoto	(United Kingdom) Adam Christodoulou	CR Scuderia
8	Thruxton	18 May	(United Kingdom) Adam Christodoulou	(United Kingdom) Adam Christodoulou	(United Kingdom) Riki Christodoulou	Fortec Motorsport
9	Croft	31 May	(United Kingdom) Adam Christodoulou	(Brazil) Adriano Buzaid	(United Kingdom) Adam Christodoulou	CR Scuderia
–	Croft	1 June	Race cancelled due to rain			
10	Silverstone GP	7 June	(Brazil) Adriano Buzaid	(Brazil) Adriano Buzaid	(Brazil) Adriano Buzaid	Fortec Motorsport
11	Silverstone GP	8 June	(Brazil) Adriano Buzaid	(United Kingdom) Riki Christodoulou	(Brazil) Adriano Buzaid	Fortec Motorsport
12*	Snetterton	12 July	(United Kingdom) Riki Christodoulou	(United Kingdom) Dean Stoneman	(United Kingdom) Alexander Sims	Manor Competition
13	Snetterton	13 July	(United Kingdom) James Calado	(United Kingdom) Riki Christodoulou	(United Kingdom) James Calado	Fortec Motorsport
14	Snetterton	13 July	(United Kingdom) Dean Stoneman	(United Kingdom) Kris Loane	(United Kingdom) Dean Stoneman	Alpine Motorsport
15	Oulton Park	26 July	(United Kingdom) James Calado	(United Kingdom) Alexander Sims	(United Kingdom) Adam Christodoulou	CR Scuderia
16	Oulton Park	27 July	(United Kingdom) Dean Stoneman	(United Kingdom) Riki Christodoulou	(United Kingdom) Adam Christodoulou	CR Scuderia
17	Silverstone National	30 August	(Brazil) Adriano Buzaid	(United Kingdom) Alexander Sims	(United Kingdom) Alexander Sims	Manor Competition
18	Silverstone National	31 August	(United Kingdom) Jordan Oakes	(Brazil) Adriano Buzaid	(Brazil) Adriano Buzaid	Fortec Motorsport
19	Brands Hatch	20 September	(Brazil) Adriano Buzaid	(Brazil) Adriano Buzaid	(Brazil) Adriano Buzaid	Fortec Motorsport
20	Brands Hatch	21 September	(United Kingdom) Dean Stoneman	(United Kingdom) Dean Stoneman	(United Kingdom) Dean Stoneman	Alpine Motorsport

* – race 12 was the replacement round for the second Croft race. Riki Christodoulou had originally won the pole in the qualifying session held.

== Driver standings ==
Points are awarded to the drivers as follows:

Position	1	2	3	4	5	6	7	8	9	10	11	12	13	14	15	16	17	18	19	20	FL
Points	32	28	25	22	20	18	16	14	12	11	10	9	8	7	6	5	4	3	2	1	2

Best 18 results count towards the championship.

- T. Pts—points if all races counted.
- Drop—two dropped scores.
- Pts—best 18 results.
- G. Pts—drivers in the Graduate Cup, with the best 15 results counting.

Pos	Driver	BRH		ROC		DON		THR		CRO	SILG		SNE			OUL		SILN		BRH		Pts	G. Pts
Pos	Driver	1	2	3	4	5	6	7	8	9	10	11	12	13	14	15	16	17	18	19	20	Pts	G. Pts
1	(United Kingdom) Adam Christodoulou	3	1	1	1	4	5	1	16	1	2	2	Ret	5	4	1	1	2	Ret	4	5	472	
2	(United Kingdom) Alexander Sims	9	4	3	4	9	3	7	3	2	5	3	1	6	3	3	2	1	4	3	2	449	
3	(Brazil) Adriano Buzaid	8	3	4	7	1	2	6	4	16	1	1	9	4	12	4	6	18	1	1	4	418	
4	(United Kingdom) Dean Stoneman (G)	16	2	5	Ret	16	1	4	Ret	5	10	5	2	2	1	2	8	3	2	8	1	398	377
5	(United Kingdom) Riki Christodoulou	1	6	7	3	2	6	2	1	3	4	19	3	3	11	Ret	16	5	14	10	3	374	
6	(United Kingdom) Kris Loane	5	13	6	6	3	4	10	Ret	8	6	10	12	7	5	9	10	8	10	2	7	296	
7	(United Kingdom) James Calado (G)	14	14	13	8	5	14	3	9	4	3	9	4	1	2	12	4	Ret	Ret	13	9	292	271
8	(United Kingdom) Oli Webb (G)	13	9	8	5	6	19	13	5	7	12	6	5	12	9	8	11	4	6	12	6	267	241
9	(United Kingdom) Scott Jenkins (G)	4	10	11	Ret	7	13	11	12	10	9	7	8	8	6	5	5	10	7	6	10	259	230
10	(United Kingdom) Jordan Oakes	12	6	Ret	Ret	Ret	18	8	6	6	11	Ret	16	9	7	6	3	7	Ret	5	8	216	
11	(Japan) Ryuji Yamamoto	6	5	2	2	Ret	8	5	Ret	Ret	15	14	11	14	14	15	Ret	14	11	9	19	204	
12	(United Kingdom) Henry Surtees (G)	15	12	10	9	17	7	12	11	Ret	Ret	20	6	11	10	7	7	12	3	11	11	203	192
13	(Australia) Joshua Scott (G)	2	8	Ret	12	8	Ret	9	2	9	7	4	17	19	Ret	10	9	11	Ret	17	Ret	198	198
14	(United Kingdom) Kieren Clark	10	16	15	10	13	16	14	10	14	17	11	10	15	15	16	12	15	5	7	17	160	
15	(United Kingdom) Ross Worswick (G)	11	Ret	14	15	10	10	Ret	14	12	8	Ret	7	13	17	11	13	6	Ret	16	12	153	149
16	(United Kingdom) Tom Armour (G)	18	Ret	16	14	14	11	17	15	11	14	15	13	Ret	Ret	14	15	13	13	19	16	109	104
17	(Netherlands) Thomas Hylkema	17	18	17	13	Ret	Ret	16	18	17	16	17	15	18	13	Ret	14	16	8	14	13	98	
18	(Estonia) Sten Pentus	DNS	11	12	11	12	9	18	8	18	Ret	13										78	
19	(Sweden) Fredrik Blomstedt					Ret	15	15	17	13	Ret	16	14	17	Ret	13	18	9	Ret	15	14	76	
20	(Japan) Sho Hanawa	7	15	9	16	11	12	Ret	7													74	
21	(South Korea) Tom Mun (G)					15	17	19	13	15	Ret	18	18	16	16	Ret	17	17	9	18	18	68	68
22	(Finland) Jesse Krohn										13	12		10	8	17	Ret	Ret	12			55	
23	(United Kingdom) Will Bratt										Ret	8										14	
24	(Sweden) Daniel Ivarsson																			Ret	15	6	
25	(United Kingdom) Richard Kent	19	17																			6	

== See also ==
- 2008 Formula Renault 2.0 UK Winter Cup
