= Riki Christodoulou =

British racing driver

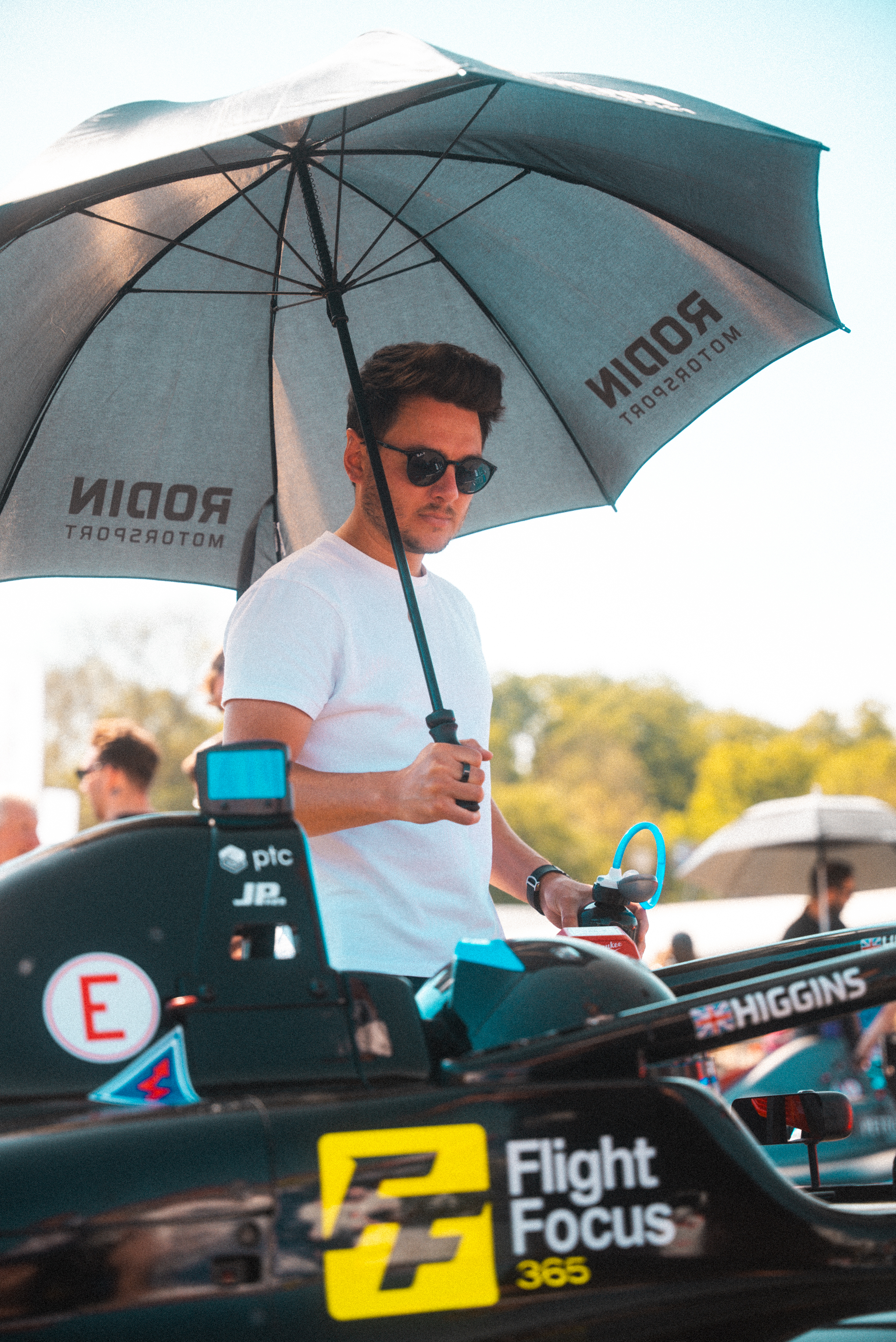
- Christodoulou in 2024
- Nationality: (United Kingdom) British
- Born: Riki James Christodoulou; 15 July 1988 (age 38) Sutton Coldfield (England)
- Relatives: Adam Christodoulou (cousin)

British F3 career
- Debut season: 2009
- Current team: Fortec Motorsport
- Categorisation: FIA Gold (until 2013); FIA Silver (2014–)
- Car number: 51
- Starts: 20
- Wins: 1
- Poles: 0
- Fastest laps: 0
- Best finish: 5th in 2009

Previous series
- 2007–08 2007 2007 2006–07: Formula Renault UK; French Formula Renault; Formula Renault NEC; FRUK Winter Series

Riki James Christodoulou (born 15 July 1988) is a British racing driver, born in Sutton Coldfield. His cousin Adam Christodoulou is also a British racing driver.

== Career ==
=== Karting ===
Christodoulou began racing in 1996, and has raced karts in the UK, Italy, France, Belgium, including winning at Spa, and in Japan. However, it wasn't until 1999 when he started to make waves on the British karting circuit. He won the Shennington Kart Club's Formula Cadet class, edging out cousin Adam by only two points – 217 to 215. Both Christodoulous struggled the following season, with Adam coming seventh and Riki 14th. Riki got the edge on Adam in the National Cadet Championship, with Riki finishing fifth, 60 points behind champion Alexander Sims. After a somewhat disappointing 2001 in the TKM class, Riki moved into the Intercontinental A Junior class for 2002. Fifth place in the Super 1 JICA Championship led him towards a championship campaign in 2003. He did indeed win the championship, edging out Freddie Martin-Dye by just 2 points. He and Martin-Dye both moved up into the main ICA class, and Riki finished joint third in the championship – amazingly missing out on the title by three points, finishing tied with Dan Cruttenden. Formula A beckoned and Riki ended 2005 with two runner-up positions – losing to Jason Edgar in the British Open and Mark Litchfield in Super 1 (Riki tied with Gary Catt and Jason Parrott for second). Riki's final season of karting came in 2006, when he had another second – this time coming in the European Championship – beaten only by legendary Italian Marco Ardigò.

=== Formula Renault ===
Riki moved up to Formula Renault for the 2006 UK Winter Series. Driving for Fortec Motorsports team, Riki finished fifth in the championship, which was dominated by French interloper Franck Mailleux. He competed in the main championship for the first time in 2007. Riki had a solid season, with seven podiums including a maiden victory coming at the final round at Thruxton leaving him sixth in the championship. Another Winter Series campaign followed, and Christo finished runner-up behind Richard Singleton. Riki also won a round of the Formula Renault 2.0 Northern European Cup at Oschersleben. A sophomore season of FRUK occurred in 2008, and again Riki scored consistently, with nine podiums and two wins for a fifth place overall championship standing. Cousin Adam went on to win the title with seven wins and eleven podiums.

=== Formula Three ===
Riki was looking to move up into the British Formula 3 Championship for the 2009 season, and at the first pre-season test, Riki was underneath the Formula Three lap record at Snetterton. On 3 April 2009, Christodoulou signed a deal to drive for Fortec Motorsport in the series. Riki took his first win in the series at Snetterton, holding off championship leader Daniel Ricciardo, Walter Grubmüller and Renger van der Zande. He had one win and four podiums in 2009, unfortunately having five DNF's during the season, costing him a lot of points. He finished fifth overall in the championship standings, also being the Top Rookie. Christodoulou returned to Formula Renault UK in 2010 for the last half of the season with CRS Racing for one round, then Fortec Motorsport for the latter and finished 11th in points with one win and four podiums. He returned to British F3 in 2011 for three race meetings and finished 12th in points for Hitech Racing with one win and three podiums.

=== Sports cars ===
In 2012, Christodoulou left open-wheel cars for sports cars and competed in the GT3 class of the British GT Championship in a Team WFR Ginetta G55. He competed in seven races but failed to score.

=== Complete Formula Renault 2.0 NEC results ===
(key) (Races in bold indicate pole position) (Races in italics indicate fastest lap)

Year	Entrant	1	2	3	4	5	6	7	8	9	10	11	12	13	14	15	16	DC	Points
2007	Fortec Motorsport	ZAN; 1	ZAN; 2	OSC; 1; 6	**OSC**; **2**; 1*	ASS; 1	ASS; 2	ZOL; 1	ZOL; 1	NUR; 1	NUR; 2	OSC; 1	OSC; 2	SPA; 1	SPA; 2	HOC; 1	HOC; 2	30th	45
