= Andy Meyrick =

British racing driver (born 1985)

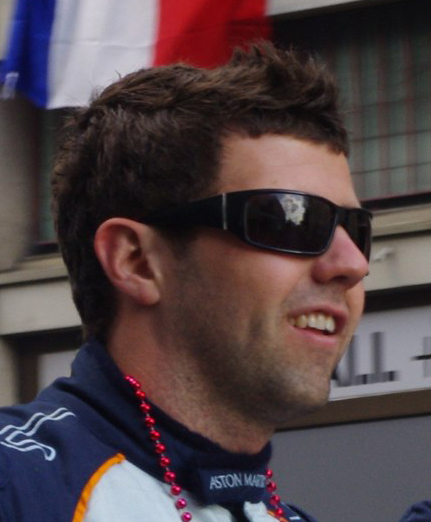
- Meyrick in 2011
- Nationality: (United Kingdom) British
- Born: 4 September 1985 (age 41) Chester, United Kingdom

GT World Challenge Europe career
- Current team: Team Parker Racing
- Categorisation: FIA Gold

Previous series
- 2014 2014–2013 2013 2012 2011 2010 2009 2008 2007–2006 2005: United SportsCar Championship; Blancpain Endurance Series; American Le Mans Series; Porsche Carrera Cup Great Britain; Intercontinental Le Mans Cup; American Le Mans Series; Le Mans Series; British Formula Three; British Formula Renault Championship; Formula Ford 1600 North West

Championship titles
- 2005: Formula Ford 1600 North West

Awards
- 2011-2009 2008: BRDC Superstar; MSA Race Elite

Andrew James Meyrick (born 4 September 1985) is a British racing driver from Wales who currently competes in the European Le Mans Series for United Autosports.

== Racing career ==
=== Single seaters ===
Meyrick made his racing debut in the BRSCC Formula Ford 1600 North West championship at Oulton Park. He won the fifth race of his career and went on to win a total of ten races during the season, taking the Pre 90 class championship in a vintage Reynard 84FF. The following season he stepped up to the British Formula Ford Championship, driving for Cliff Dempsey Racing in the Ray GR06 alongside Peter Dempsey. Later in 2006, Meyrick joined Falcon Motorsport to drive in the Formula Renault BARC Championship, earning a pole position and a second-place finish in his third outing, at Thruxton Circuit. After the 2007 Formula Renault UK Wintercup, Meyrick joined Team West-Tec for two races in the British Formula Renault. The following season, Meyrick stepped up to the British Formula Three Championship with Carlin Motorsport in the National class. He drove in twelve races in the championship, earning seven class victories and a fifth place in the championship.

=== Endurance racing ===
Meyrick turned his attention to sports car racing, entering the 2009 Le Mans Series season with Kolles driving an Audi R10 TDI. The team's best finish came at the 2009 1000 km of Nürburgring, where Meyrick, Narain Karthikeyan and Charles Zwolsman Jr. finished fourth. Meyrick joined Dyson Racing in the American Le Mans Series for the 2010 12 Hours of Sebring and the 2010 Monterey Sports Car Championships. Also in 2010, Meyrick entered his first 24 Hours of Le Mans, partnering with Soheil Ayari and Didier André in an AIM Team Oreca Matmut Oreca 01. The team finished the race as the first non-Audi, taking fourth overall. Following this success he was signed by Aston Martin Racing to join their LMP1 program. The team's best result came at the 2011 6 Hours of Zhuhai, when the No. 007 car finished sixth. Meyrick also raced in the vintage Group C Racing championship, winning two out of four races with four podium finishes and earning the C2 class title. Meyrick drove one race in an Aston Martin AMR1 in the Group C Racing championship's C1 class, winning the race from pole.

In 2012, Meyrick entered the Porsche Carrera Cup Great Britain for five events. At his debut at the Knockhill Racing Circuit he finished third behind Michael Meadows and Sam Tordoff and went on to finish 13th in the championship. Meyrick joined the DeltaWing program at beginning of the 2013 American Le Mans Series season, just before the 12 Hours of Sebring. Katherine Legge joined the team at the second race of the season and the two drivers took the team to seventh in the P1 class standings. Meyrick and Legge each led eight laps at Road America, the first race lead for the revolutionary prototype.

Late in 2013, Meyrick signed on as a "Bentley Boy" and raced in the Blancpain Endurance Series for M-Sport in a factory-backed Bentley Continental GT. Meyrick was integral in the development of the car, which he drove to fourth place in its first outing at the Abu Dhabi Gulf 12 Hours. Meyrick returned to the works Bentley GT Team in 2014, winning at Silverstone and Paul Ricard, and with teammates Guy Smith and Steven Kane, finished second in both the drivers and team championship. Meyrick also continued driving the DeltaWing in the TUDOR United SportsCar Championship, with a season-high finish of fourth at the team's home race, Petit Le Mans at Road Atlanta. Meyrick was recognized for his achievements with the John Cobb Trophy from the British Racing Drivers' Club (BRDC).

In 2015, Meyrick drove the endurance events only for the DeltaWing team, focusing on the Bentley factory Blancpain campaign. The team won two races (Paul Ricard and Spa-Francorchamps) and finished runner up in the championship.

Meyrick returned to Blancpain Endurance Series competition, now dubbed the GT World Challenge Europe, in 2023, driving for Team Parker Racing in a Porsche 911 GT3 R (992). Teamed with Derek Pierce and Kiern Jewiss, Meyrick lined up in the newly named Bronze Cup class.

== Motorsports results ==
=== 24 Hours of Le Mans results ===
Year	Team	Co-Drivers	Car	Class	Laps	Pos.	Class Pos.
2010	(France) AIM Team Oreca Matmut	(France) Soheil Ayari (France) Didier André	Oreca 01-AIM	LMP1	369	4th	4th
2011	(United Kingdom) Aston Martin Racing	(Switzerland) Harold Primat (Mexico) Adrián Fernández	Aston Martin AMR-One	LMP1	2	DNF	DNF

=== WeatherTech SportsCar Championship ===
(key)(Races in bold indicate pole position, Results are overall/class)

Year	Team	Class	Make	Engine	1	2	3	4	5	6	7	8	9	10	11	Rank	Points
2014	DeltaWing Racing Cars	P	DeltaWing DWC13	Élan (Mazda) 1.9 L I4 Turbo	DAY; 16	SEB; 15	LBH	LGA; 9	DET	WGL	MOS; DNS	IMS	ELK; 6	COA	PET; 4	21st	111
2015	DeltaWing Racing Cars w/ Claro/TracFone	P	DeltaWing DWC13	Élan (Mazda) 1.9 L I4 Turbo	DAY; 15	SEB; 12	LBH	LGA	DET	WGL	MOS	ELK	COA	PET; 8		17th	61
2016	Panoz DeltaWing Racing	P	DeltaWing DWC13	Élan (Mazda) 1.9 L I4 Turbo	DAY; 12	SEB; 9	LBH; 8	LGA	DET	WGL	MOS	ELK	COA	PET; 8		17th	91

=== Complete European Le Mans Series results ===
Year	Entrant	Class	Chassis	Engine	1	2	3	4	5	6	Rank	Points
2023	United Autosports USA	LMP2 Pro/Am	Oreca 07	Gibson GK428 4.2 L V8	CAT; 10	LEC; 5	ARA; 3	SPA; 3	POR; 4	ALG; 9	6th	55
2024	United Autosports	LMP2 Pro-Am	Oreca 07	Gibson GK428 4.2 L V8	CAT	LEC	IMO	SPA	MUG	ALG		
