= Alexander Sims (racing driver) =

British racing driver (born 1988)

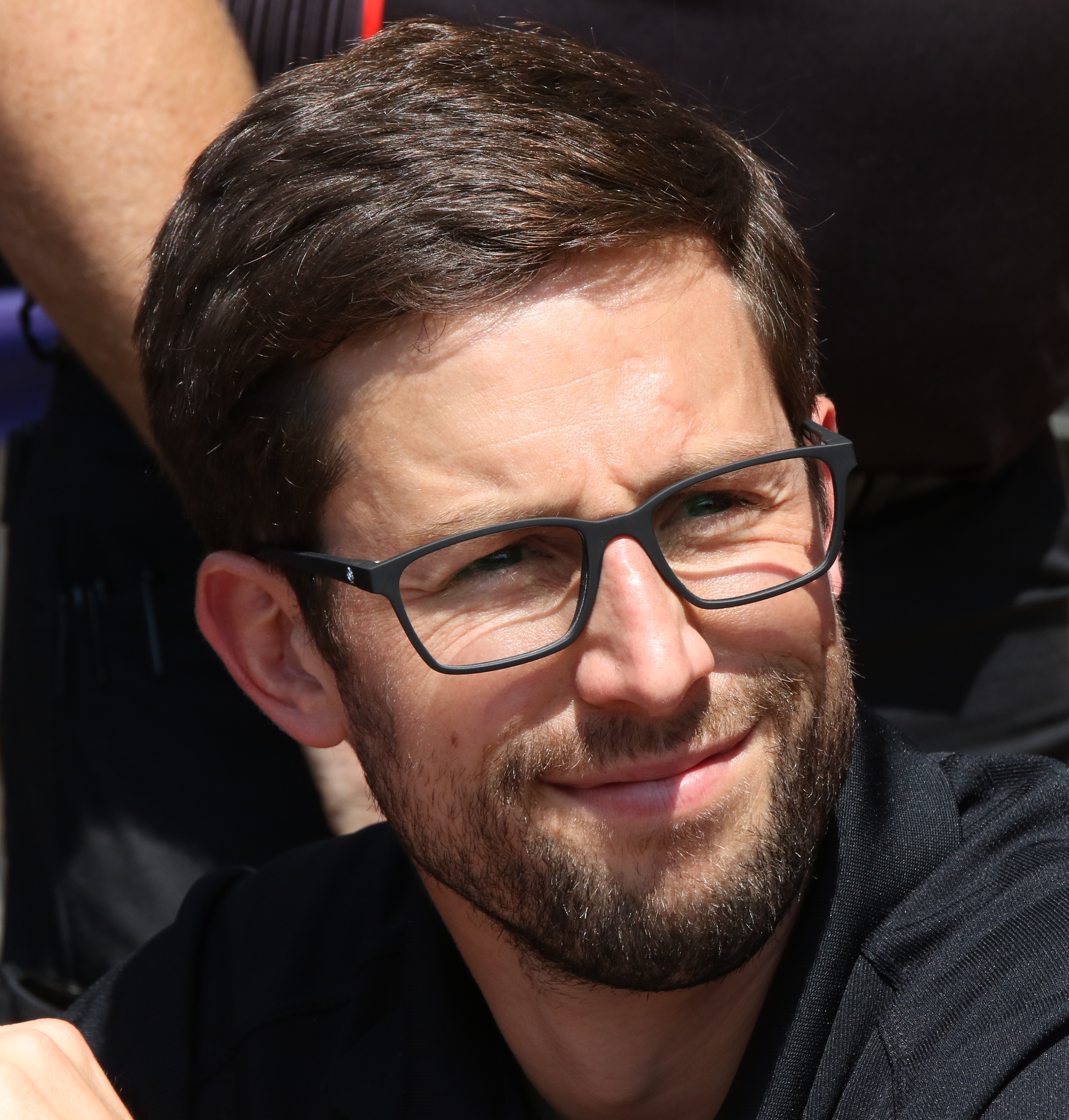
- Sims in 2023
- Nationality: (United Kingdom) British
- Born: Alexander George Oliver Sims; 15 March 1988 (age 38) London, England

IMSA SportsCar Championship career
- Debut season: 2017
- Current team: Corvette Racing by Pratt Miller Motorsports
- Categorisation: FIA Platinum (until 2014, 2018–); FIA Gold (2015–2017)
- Car number: 3
- Former teams: Action Express Racing; BMW Team RLL
- Starts: 64
- Championships: 1
- Wins: 9
- Podiums: 22
- Poles: 8
- Fastest laps: 10
- Best finish: 1st in 2023 (GTP); 2025 (GTD Pro)

Previous series
- 2018–2022 2014–2015 2012–13, 15 2009–10, 12 2008 2008 2008 2007–08 2007 2007 2006–07: Formula E British GT; FIA European F3 Championship; Formula 3 Euro Series; Eurocup Formula Renault 2.0; Formula Renault 2.0 WEC; Formula Renault UK; Formula Renault 2.0 France; Formula Renault 2.0 NEC; FRUK 2.0 Winter Series

Championship titles
- 2023, 2025: IMSA SportsCar Championship

Awards
- 2008: McLaren Autosport Award

Alexander George Oliver Sims (born 15 March 1988, in London) is a British professional racing driver, currently competing in the IMSA SportsCar Championship for Corvette Racing by Pratt Miller Motorsports. He previously drove for Whelen Engineering Racing in IMSA where he won the 2023 IMSA SportsCar Championship. Previously Sims has driven in the ABB FIA Formula E Championship for Mahindra Racing and BMW i Andretti Motorsport, winning one race in Diriyah.

Sims was the winner of the 2008 McLaren Autosport BRDC Award for promising young British drivers.

== Career ==
=== Karting ===
Sims' kart racing career started in 1998 when he started competing in club competitions. In 2000, Sims had a successful campaign, he won the Super 1 MSA Cadet Championship, the Kartmasters Grand Prix, the 5 Nations Cup and came second in the Champions of The Future British Cadet Championship. Sims latterly added the JICA British Championship, the Monaco Kart Cup, three British Grands Prix and the Formula A World Championship, before moving into single-seaters in 2006.

=== Formula Renault ===
Having started his car racing career in late 2006, Sims scored a second place in his first ever car race in the Formula Renault UK 2.0 Winter Series, before finishing ninth in the championship standings. In 2007, Sims raced in the main series with Manor Competition. He finished eighth overall, after taking one win at Donington Park, and second places at Brands Hatch and Thruxton. He also forayed into the French and Northern European Cup championships during the season and added his first pole position in the category, at Val de Vienne during the French championship. Sims also contested the 2007 UK Winter Series, but failed to finish in three of the four races.

Sims remained with Manor Competition in Formula Renault UK for 2008, and challenged for the championship. Finishing every race, Sims actually scored the most points over the course of the championship, with 473. However, Formula Renault UK employs a points system that means that a driver must drop their two worst scores over the season. Unfortunately for Sims, his worst scores were a pair of ninths worth 24 points, and Adam Christodoulou, his main championship rival dropped two retirements. Thus, a 24-point swing resulted in Christodoulou turning a one-point deficit into a 23-point championship win. He also contested the final round of the Formula BMW Pacific in Macau, finishing eighth with the fastest lap. In December 2008, Sims won the McLaren Autosport BRDC Award.

=== Formula Three ===
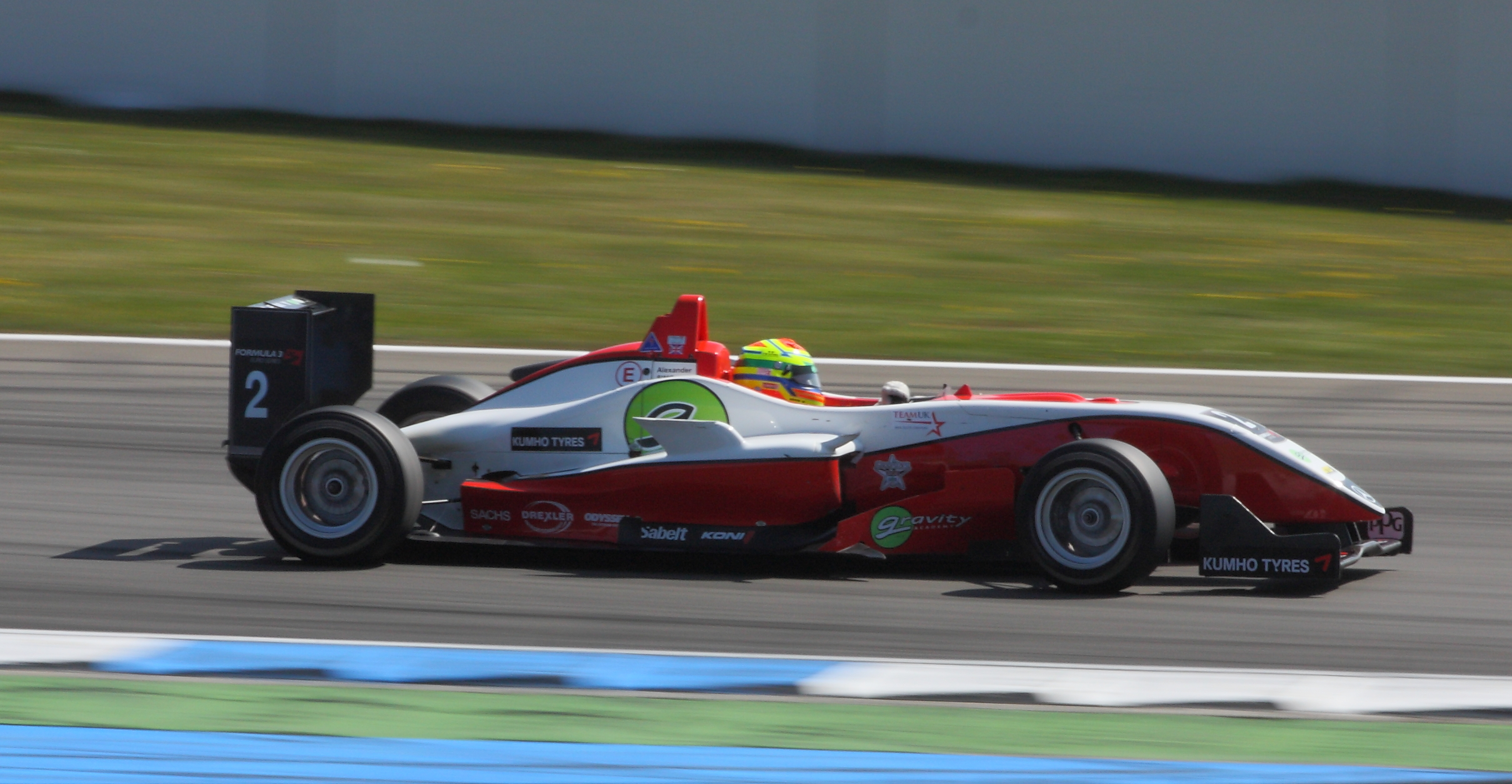
Sims competing at the second round of the 2010 Formula 3 Euro Series at Hockenheim

At the 2008 Autosport Awards ceremony, Sims announced his plans to race with German team Mücke Motorsport in the Formula 3 Euro Series. In a season dominated by Jules Bianchi, Sims took fourth place in the championship, with a win at the Nürburgring and four second places. He also took part in two rounds of the International Formula Master series, with two fourth places at the Hungaroring being his best results. For 2010, Sims would move to ART Grand Prix.

In 2013, Sims competed in a partial GP3 season. He first raced at the Nürburgring for Status Grand Prix in place of Adderly Fong. He then competed in the final three rounds for Carlin, replacing Eric Lichtenstein. Despite only participating in half of the races, he finished the season in eighth place, with one win and two further podiums.

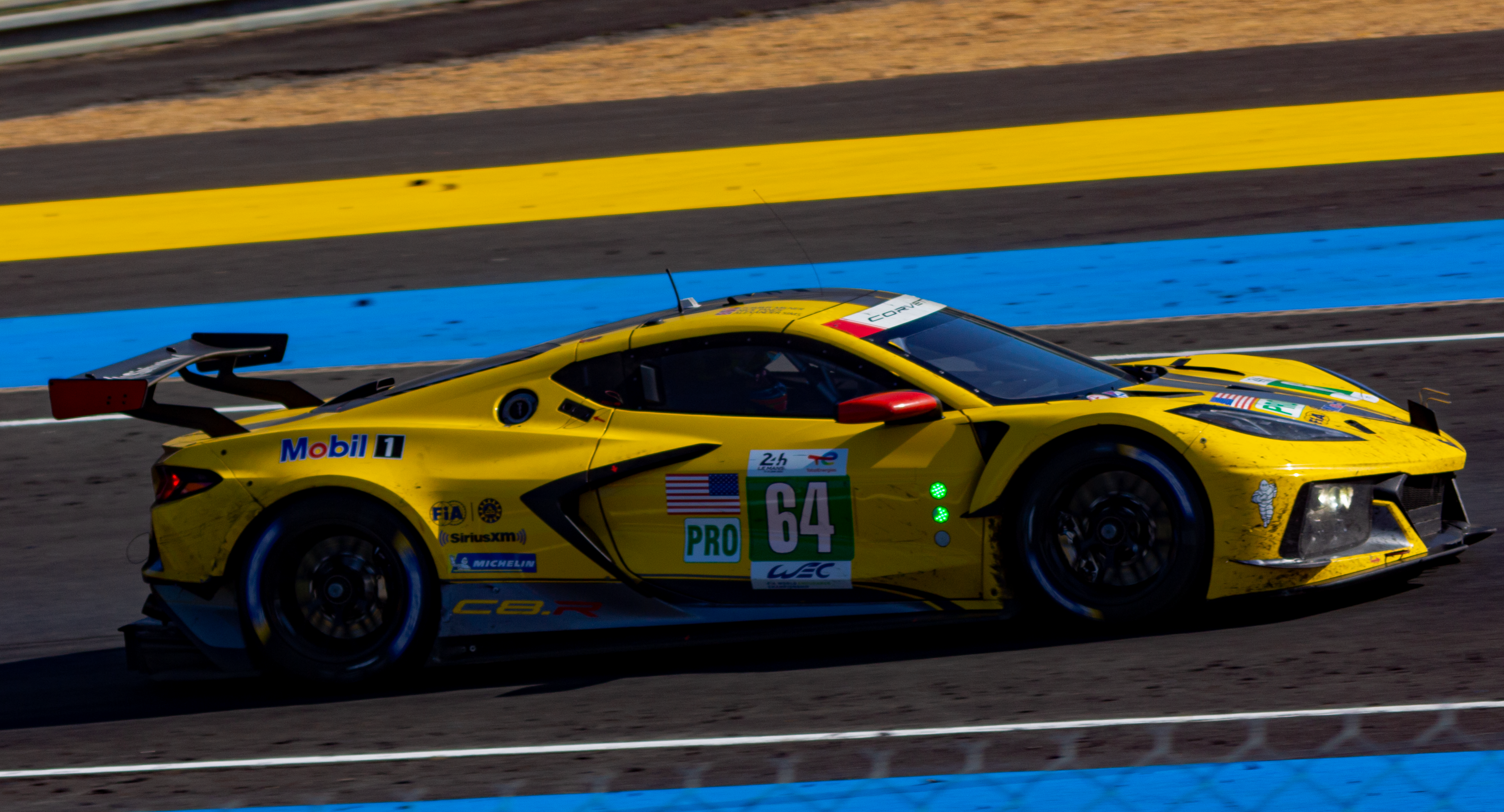
Sims driving at the 2022 24 Hours of Le Mans.

=== Sports car racing ===
In 2012, Sims drove a Lola-Judd LMP2 for Status Grand Prix at the 24 Hours of Le Mans and two rounds of the European Le Mans Series.

Sims joined Hexis Racing in 2013 to compete at the Blancpain Endurance Series with a McLaren MP4-12C, partnering with Álvaro Parente and Stef Dusseldorp.

In 2014 and 2015, Sims raced at the British GT Championship for Ecurie Ecosse with a BMW Z4.

Sims competed at the 2016 Blancpain GT Series for Rowe Racing with a BMW M6, winning the 24 Hours of Spa.

In 2017, Sims competed at the GT Le Mans class of the IMSA SportsCar Championship with a factory BMW M6.

Sims competed in two races of the 2018–19 FIA World Endurance Championship for BMW Team MTEK.

=== Formula E ===
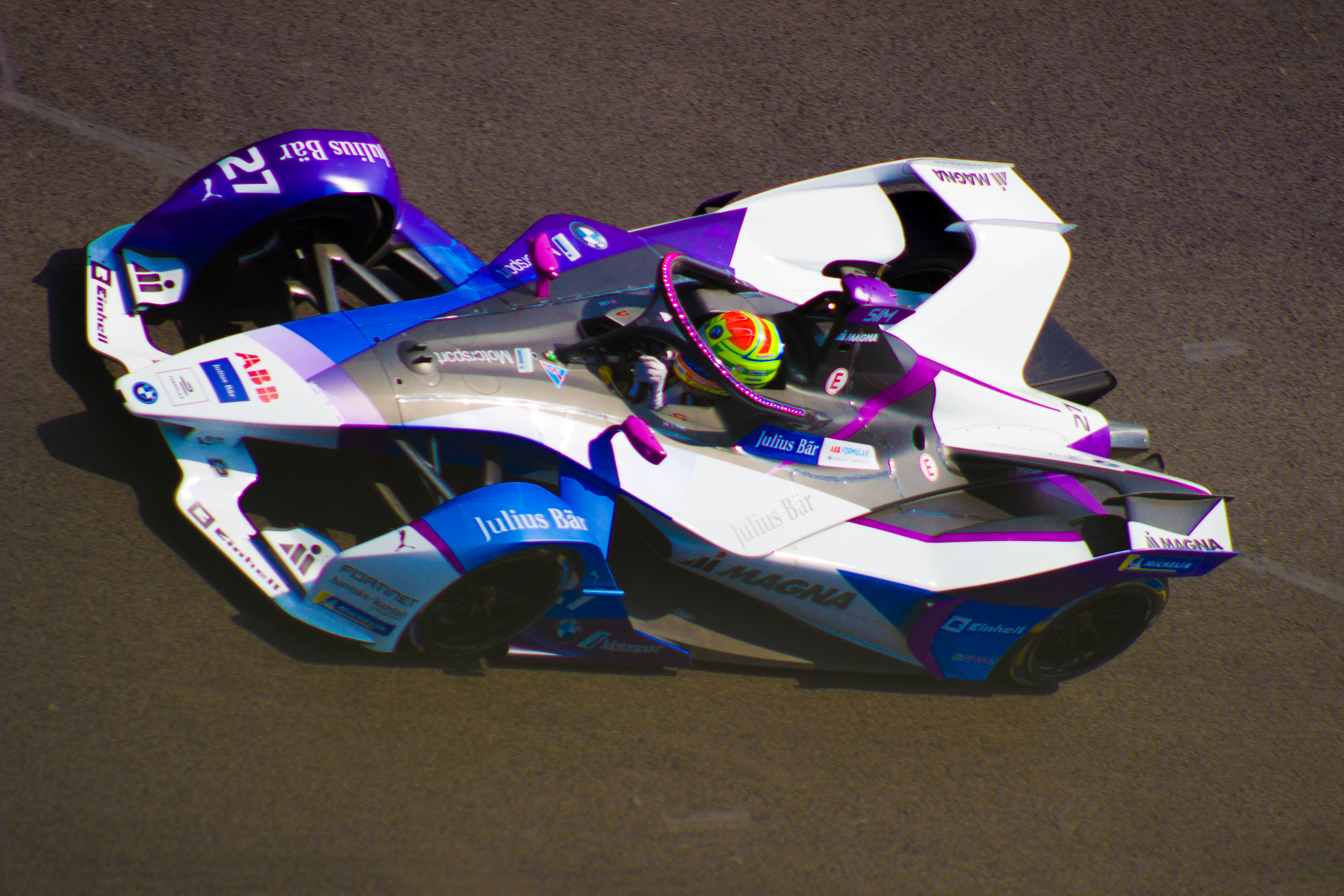
Sims driving for BMW i Andretti at the 2020 Mexico City ePrix.

In May 2017, Sims was present at the Monaco ePrix as a stand-by option for Robin Frijns. Later that month, he was announced as a development driver for MS Amlin Andretti for the 2017-18 season. He would join BMW for Season 5, partnering Antonio Felix Da Costa. At the final race of the season at the 2019 New York City ePrix, Sims claimed pole position and the first podium of his Formula E career finishing second. Returning with BMW for the 2019–20 Formula E season, Sims won his first race in Formula E at race 2 of the 2019 Diriyah ePrix.

In August 2020, it was announced that Sims would replace Jérôme d'Ambrosio at Mahindra Racing for the 2020–21 Formula E season, who retired from competitive racing to become deputy team principal at Venturi Racing. Sims ended the season with a podium in the 2021 Rome ePrix, five point scoring finishes, and 54 points, enough for 19th at the end of the year standings. For 2022, Sims would stay with Mahindra, but this time partnered by Oliver Rowland. Sims departed from Formula E after the end of the 2021-22 season.

== Racing record ==
=== Career summary ===
Season	Series	Team	Races	Wins	Poles	F/Laps	Podiums	Points	Position
2006	Formula Renault UK Winter Cup	Manor Competition	4	0	0	1	1	52	9th
2007	Formula Renault UK	Manor Competition	20	1	0	1	3	272	8th
2007	Formula Renault 2.0 NEC	Manor Competition	2	0	0	0	0	16	37th
2007	Formula Renault UK Winter Cup	Manor Competition	4	0	0	0	0	20	19th
2007	French Formula Renault 2.0	Manor Competition	5	0	1	0	0	19	15th
2007	French Formula Renault 2.0	Pole Services	4	0	0	0	0	19	15th
2008	Formula Renault UK	Manor Competition	20	2	1	3	12	449	**2nd**
2008	Formula Renault 2.0 WEC	Manor Competition	2	0	0	0	0	0	NC
2008	Eurocup Formula Renault 2.0	SG Formula	2	0	0	0	0	7	19th
2008	Formula BMW Pacific	Team Meritus	1	0	0	1	0	0	NC†
2009	Formula 3 Euro Series	Mücke Motorsport	20	1	1	2	5	54	4th
2009	Masters of Formula 3	Mücke Motorsport	1	0	0	0	0	N/A	5th
2009	International Formula Master	IFM Talent Support Program	4	0	0	0	0	0	NC†
2009	Macau Grand Prix	City of Dreams/Räikkönen Robertson	1	0	0	0	0	N/A	18th
2010	Formula 3 Euro Series	ART Grand Prix	18	1	0	0	5	63	4th
2010	British Formula 3 International Series	ART Grand Prix	6	1	0	1	2	0	NC†
2010	Masters of Formula 3	ART Grand Prix	1	0	1	0	1	N/A	**2nd**
2010	Auto GP	Charouz-Gravity Racing	4	0	0	0	0	0	25th
2010	Macau Grand Prix	Räikkönen Robertson Racing	1	0	0	0	0	N/A	DNF
2011	GP3 Series	Status Grand Prix	16	1	0	2	5	34	6th
2011	British Formula 3 International Series	Motopark	3	1	0	0	1	17	18th
2011	Macau Grand Prix	TOM'S	1	0	0	0	0	N/A	18th
2012	European Le Mans Series - LMP2	Status Grand Prix	2	0	0	0	1	15	10th
2012	24 Hours of Le Mans - LMP2	Status Grand Prix	1	0	0	0	0	N/A	DNF
2012	Formula 3 Euro Series	ThreeBond with T-Sport	3	1	0	2	1	0	NC†
2012	FIA Formula 3 European Championship	ThreeBond with T-Sport	2	0	0	0	0	0	NC†
2012	Macau Grand Prix	ThreeBond with T-Sport	1	0	0	0	0	N/A	15th
2013	FIA Formula 3 European Championship	ThreeBond with T-Sport	12	0	0	1	5	112	10th
2013	Macau Grand Prix	ThreeBond with T-Sport	1	0	0	0	0	N/A	4th
2013	GP3 Series	Status Grand Prix	2	0	0	0	1	77	8th
2013	GP3 Series	Carlin	6	1	0	1	2	77	8th
2013	Blancpain Endurance Series	Hexis Racing	5	0	0	0	1	24	15th
2013	FIA GT Series	Boutsen Ginion Racing	2	0	0	0	0	0	NC†
2014	British GT Championship	Ecurie Ecosse powered by Black Bull	8	2	3	4	4	129.5	**3rd**
2014	Blancpain Endurance Series	Triple 888 Racing	1	0	0	0	0	9	22nd
2014	Blancpain Endurance Series - Pro-Am	Ecurie Ecosse	1	0	0	0	1	0	NC†
2014	24 Hours of Nürburgring - SP9	BMW Sports Trophy Team Schubert	1	0	0	0	0	N/A	DNF
2015	British GT Championship	Ecurie Ecosse powered by Black Bull	9	2	2	0	4	143.5	**2nd**
2015	Blancpain Endurance Series - Pro-Am	Ecurie Ecosse	1	0	0	0	0	22	16th
2015	FIA Formula 3 European Championship	HitechGP	6	0	0	1	0	0	NC†
2015	Macau Grand Prix	Double R Racing	1	0	0	0	1	N/A	**3rd**
2015	24 Hours of Nürburgring - SP9	BMW Sports Trophy Team Schubert	1	0	0	0	0	N/A	DNF
2016	Blancpain GT Series Sprint Cup	Rowe Racing	10	0	0	0	2	23	11th
2016	Blancpain GT Series Endurance Cup	Rowe Racing	5	1	0	0	1	56	4th
2016	24 Hours of Nürburgring - SP9	Rowe Racing	1	0	0	0	0	N/A	5th
2016	British GT Championship	Barwell Motorsport	5	0	0	1	0	23	14th
2016	FIA Formula 3 European Championship	HitechGP	3	0	0	0	0	0	NC†
2016	Macau Grand Prix	Double R Racing	1	0	0	0	0	N/A	10th
2017	IMSA SportsCar Championship - GTLM	BMW Team RLL	11	3	0	2	4	317	**2nd**
2017	Blancpain GT Series Endurance Cup	Rowe Racing	4	0	0	0	0	6	27th
2017	Intercontinental GT Challenge	Rowe Racing	1	0	0	0	0	0	NC
2017	24 Hours of Nürburgring - SP9	Rowe Racing	1	0	0	0	1	N/A	**2nd**
2017–18	Formula E	MS Amlin Andretti	Development driver						
2018	IMSA SportsCar Championship - GTLM	BMW Team RLL	11	2	1	0	4	304	6th
2018	Blancpain GT Series Endurance Cup	Rowe Racing	3	0	0	0	1	29	15th
2018	24 Hours of Nürburgring - SP9	Rowe Racing	1	0	0	0	0	N/A	DNF
2018	24 Hours of Le Mans - LMGTE Pro	BMW Team MTEK	1	0	0	0	0	N/A	DNF
2018–19	Formula E	BMW i Andretti Motorsport	13	0	1	0	1	57	13th
2018–19	FIA World Endurance Championship - LMGTE Pro	BMW Team MTEK	2	0	0	0	1	23	19th
2019	Italian GT Endurance Championship - GT3	BMW Team Italia	2	1	1	1	1	?	?
2019–20	Formula E	BMW i Andretti Motorsport	11	1	2	1	1	49	13th
2020	Italian GT Endurance Championship - GT3	BMW Team Italia	2	0	0	1	2	27	7th
2020	24 Hours of Nürburgring - SP9	Rowe Racing	1	1	0	0	1	N/A	**1st**
2020–21	Formula E	Mahindra Racing	15	0	0	1	1	54	19th
2021	IMSA SportsCar Championship - GTLM	Corvette Racing	3	0	1	1	1	953	10th
2021	24 Hours of Nürburgring - SP9	Schubert Motorsport	1	0	0	0	0	N/A	6th
2021–22	Formula E	Mahindra Racing	16	0	0	0	0	14	17th
2022	FIA World Endurance Championship - LMGTE Pro	Corvette Racing	1	0	1	0	0	1	28th
2022	24 Hours of Le Mans - LMGTE Pro	Corvette Racing	1	0	1	0	0	N/A	DNF
2022	British GT Championship - GT3	Century Motorsport	2	1	0	1	2	60	11th
2022	24 Hours of Nürburgring - SP9	Schubert Motorsport	1	0	0	0	0	N/A	DNF
2023	IMSA SportsCar Championship - GTP	Whelen Engineering Racing	9	1	2	3	3	2733	**1st**
2023	24 Hours of Le Mans - Hypercar	Action Express Racing	1	0	0	0	0	N/A	10th
2023	24 Hours of Nürburgring - SP9	Scherer Sport PHX	1	0	0	0	0	N/A	DNF
2024	IMSA SportsCar Championship - GTD Pro	Corvette Racing by Pratt Miller Motorsports	10	1	2	2	3	2646	**3rd**
2024	GT World Challenge Europe Sprint Cup	Madpanda Motorsport	2	0	0	0	0	0	NC
2024	GT World Challenge Europe Endurance Cup	Triple Eight JMR	1	0	0	0	0	0	NC
2024	GT World Challenge America - Pro	DXDT Racing	1	0	0	0	0	30	10th
2025	IMSA SportsCar Championship - GTD Pro	Corvette Racing by Pratt Miller Motorsports	10	1	0	1	6	3265	**1st**
2025	GT World Challenge Asia	Johor Motorsports Racing JMR	6	1	0	0	2	77	9th
2025	GT World Challenge Europe Endurance Cup	Johor Motorsports JMR	1	0	0	0	0	0	NC
2025	Suzuka 1000 km	Johor Motorsports JMR	1	0	0	0	1	N/A	**3rd**
2025–26	Asian Le Mans Series - GT	Johor Motorsports JMR	6	0	2	0	0	2	27th
2026	IMSA SportsCar Championship - GTD Pro	Corvette Racing by Pratt Miller Motorsports	10	1	2	1	1	2776	8th
2026	Nürburgring Langstrecken-Serie - SP9	Scherer Sport PHX							
2026	24 Hours of Nürburgring - SP9	Scherer Sport PHX	1	0	0	0	0	N/A	DNF
2026	Intercontinental GT Challenge	Johor Motorsports JMR	2	0	0	0	0	12	24th

^{†} As Sims was a guest driver, he was ineligible for points.
^{*} Season still in progress.

=== Complete Formula Renault 2.0 NEC results ===
(key) (Races in bold indicate pole position) (Races in italics indicate fastest lap)

Year	Entrant	1	2	3	4	5	6	7	8	9	10	11	12	13	14	15	16	DC	Points
2007	Manor Competition	ZAN; 1	ZAN; 2	OSC; 1	OSC; 2	ASS; 1	ASS; 2	ZOL; 1	ZOL; 1	NUR; 1 Ret	NUR; 2; 5	OSC; 1	OSC; 2	SPA; 1	SPA; 2	HOC; 1	HOC; 2	37th	16

=== Complete Eurocup Formula Renault 2.0 results ===
(key) (Races in bold indicate pole position; races in italics indicate fastest lap)

Year	Entrant	1	2	3	4	5	6	7	8	9	10	11	12	13	14	DC	Points
2008	SG Formula	SPA; 1	SPA; 2	SIL; 1	SIL; 2	HUN; 1	HUN; 2	NÜR; 1	NÜR; 2	LMS; 1; 6	LMS; 2; 9	EST; 1	EST; 2	CAT; 1	CAT; 2	19th	7

=== Complete Formula 3 Euro Series results ===
(key) (Races in bold indicate pole position) (Races in italics indicate fastest lap)

Year	Entrant	Chassis	Engine	1	2	3	4	5	6	7	8	9	10	11	12	13	14	15	16	17	18	19	20	21	22	23	24	DC	Points
2009	Mücke Motorsport	Dallara F308/005	Mercedes	HOC; 1; 17	HOC; 2; 8	LAU; 1 Ret	LAU; 2; 22	**NOR**; **1**; 2	NOR; 2; 16	ZAN; 1; 13	ZAN; 2; 9	OSC; 1; 5	OSC; 2; 4	NÜR; 1; 7	NÜR; 2; 1	BRH; 1; 4	BRH; 2; 2	CAT; 1; 2	CAT; 2; 2	DIJ; 1; 8	DIJ; 2; 4	HOC; 1; 6	HOC; 2; 14†					4th	54
2010	ART Grand Prix	Dallara F308/048	Mercedes	LEC; 1; 3	LEC; 2; 1	HOC; 1 Ret	HOC; 2; 8	VAL; 1; 3	VAL; 2; 5	NOR; 1; 4	NOR; 2; 4	NÜR; 1; 4	NÜR; 2; 3	ZAN; 1; 4	ZAN; 2; 5	BRH; 1; 5	BRH; 2; 8	OSC; 1; 2	OSC; 2; 8	HOC; 1; 4	HOC; 2; 5							4th	63
2012	ThreeBond with T-Sport	Dallara F312/008	ThreeBond Nissan	HOC; 1	HOC; 2	HOC; 3	BRH; 1	BRH; 2	BRH; 3	RBR; 1	RBR; 2	RBR; 3	NOR; 1	NOR; 2	NOR; 3	NÜR; 1; 8	NÜR; 2; 1	NÜR; 3; 12	ZAN; 1	ZAN; 2	ZAN; 3	VAL; 1	VAL; 2	VAL; 3	HOC; 1	HOC; 2	HOC; 3	NC‡	0‡

^{†} Driver did not finish the race, but was classified as he completed over 90% of the race distance.
^{‡} As Sims was a guest driver, he was ineligible for championship points.

=== Complete Auto GP results ===
(key) (Races in bold indicate pole position; races in italics indicate fastest lap)

Year	Entrant	1	2	3	4	5	6	7	8	9	10	11	12	Pos	Points
2010	Charouz-Gravity Racing	BRN; 1	BRN; 2	IMO; 1	IMO; 2	SPA; 1	SPA; 2	MAG; 1	MAG; 2	NAV; 1; 11	NAV; 2 Ret	MNZ; 1; 9	MNZ; 2; 15	25th	0

=== Complete GP3 Series results ===
(key) (Races in bold indicate pole position) (Races in italics indicate fastest lap)

Year	Entrant	1	2	3	4	5	6	7	8	9	10	11	12	13	14	15	16	DC	Points
2011	Status Grand Prix	IST; FEA; 8	IST; SPR; 1	CAT; FEA; Ret	CAT; SPR; Ret	VAL; FEA; 6	VAL; SPR; 2	SIL; FEA; 2	SIL; SPR; 3	NÜR; FEA; 12	NÜR; SPR; 2	HUN; FEA; DSQ	HUN; SPR; 9	SPA; FEA; Ret	SPA; SPR; Ret	MNZ; FEA; 21†	MNZ; SPR; Ret	6th	34
2013	Status Grand Prix	CAT; FEA	CAT; SPR	VAL; FEA	VAL; SPR	SIL; FEA	SIL; SPR	NÜR; FEA; 8	NÜR; SPR; 2	HUN; FEA	HUN; SPR							8th	77
2013	Carlin											SPA; FEA; 5	SPA; SPR; 1	MNZ; FEA; 5	MNZ; SPR; 6	YMC; FEA; 2	YMC; SPR; 7	8th	77

=== Complete FIA Formula 3 European Championship results ===
(key) (Races in bold indicate pole position) (Races in italics indicate fastest lap)

Year	Entrant	Engine	1	2	3	4	5	6	7	8	9	10	11	12	13	14	15	16	17	18	19	20	21	22	23	24	25	26	27	28	29	30	31	32	33	DC	Points
2012	ThreeBond with T-Sport	ThreeBond Nissan	HOC; 1	HOC; 2	PAU; 1	PAU; 2	BRH; 1	BRH; 2	RBR; 1	RBR; 2	NOR; 1	NOR; 2	SPA; 1	SPA; 2	NÜR; 1; 8	NÜR; 2; 12	ZAN; 1	ZAN; 2	VAL; 1	VAL; 2	HOC; 1	HOC; 2														NC‡	0‡
2013	ThreeBond with T-Sport	ThreeBond Nissan	MNZ; 1	MNZ; 2	MNZ; 3	SIL; 1	SIL; 2	SIL; 3	HOC; 1	HOC; 2	HOC; 3	BRH; 1	BRH; 2	BRH; 3	RBR; 1	RBR; 2	RBR; 3	NOR; 1; 14	NOR; 2; 4	NOR; 3; 5	NÜR; 1; 2	NÜR; 2; 3	NÜR; 3 Ret	ZAN; 1 Ret	ZAN; 2; 10	ZAN; 3; 9	VAL; 1; 2	VAL; 2; 2	VAL; 3; 3	HOC; 1	HOC; 2	HOC; 3				10th	112
2015	HitechGP	Mercedes	SIL; 1	SIL; 2	SIL; 3	HOC; 1	HOC; 2	HOC; 3	PAU; 1	PAU; 2	PAU; 3	MNZ; 1	MNZ; 2	MNZ; 3	SPA; 1	SPA; 2	SPA; 3	NOR; 1	NOR; 2	NOR; 3	RBR; 1	RBR; 2	RBR; 3	ZAN; 1	ZAN; 2	ZAN; 3	ALG; 1; 25	ALG; 2; 15	ALG; 3; 13	NÜR; 1	NÜR; 2	NÜR; 3	HOC; 1; 5	HOC; 2 DSQ	HOC; 3; 4	NC‡	0‡
2016	HitechGP	Mercedes	LEC; 1	LEC; 2	LEC; 3	HUN; 1	HUN; 2	HUN; 3	PAU; 1	PAU; 2	PAU; 3	RBR; 1	RBR; 2	RBR; 3	NOR; 1	NOR; 2	NOR; 3	ZAN; 1	ZAN; 2	ZAN; 3	SPA; 1	SPA; 2	SPA; 3	NÜR; 1	NÜR; 2	NÜR; 3	IMO; 1	IMO; 2	IMO; 3	HOC; 1; 9	HOC; 2; 11	HOC; 3; 5				NC‡	0‡

^{‡} As Sims was a guest driver, he was ineligible for championship points.

=== Complete European Le Mans Series results ===
(key) (Races in bold indicate pole position) (Races in italics indicate fastest lap)

Year	Team	Class	Car	Engine	1	2	3	Rank	Points
2012	Status Grand Prix	LMP2	Lola B12/80	Judd-BMW HK 3.6L V8	LEC; 3	DON; Ret	PET	10th	15

=== Complete 24 Hours of Le Mans results ===
Year	Team	Co-Drivers	Car	Class	Laps	Pos.	Class Pos.
2012	(Republic of Ireland) Status Grand Prix	(Netherlands) Yelmer Buurman (France) Romain Iannetta	Lola B12/80-Judd	LMP2	239	DNF	DNF
2018	(Germany) BMW Team MTEK	(Portugal) António Félix da Costa (Brazil) Augusto Farfus	BMW M8 GTE	GTE; Pro	223	DNF	DNF
2021	(United States) Corvette Racing	(United States) Tommy Milner (United Kingdom) Nick Tandy	Chevrolet Corvette C8.R	GTE; Pro	313	44th	6th
2022	(United States) Corvette Racing	(United States) Tommy Milner (United Kingdom) Nick Tandy	Chevrolet Corvette C8.R	GTE; Pro	260	DNF	DNF
2023	(United States) Action Express Racing	(United Kingdom) Jack Aitken (Brazil) Pipo Derani	Cadillac V-Series.R	Hypercar	324	17th	10th

=== Complete FIA GT Series results ===
(key) (Races in bold indicate pole position) (Races in italics indicate fastest lap)

Year	Team	Car	Class	1	2	3	4	5	6	7	8	9	10	11	12	Pos.	Points
2013	Boutsen Ginion Racing	McLaren MP4-12C GT3	Pro	NOG; QR	NOG; CR	ZOL; QR	ZOL; CR	ZAN; QR	ZAN; QR	SVK; QR	SVK; CR	NAV; QR	NAV; CR	BAK; QR; 4	BAK; CR; 8	NC‡	0‡

‡ As Sims was a guest driver, he was ineligible for championship points.

=== Complete British GT Championship results ===
(key) (Races in bold indicate pole position) (Races in italics indicate fastest lap)

Year	Team	Car	Class	1	2	3	4	5	6	7	8	9	10	DC	Points
2014	Ecurie Ecosse powered by Black Bull	BMW Z4 GT3	GT3	OUL; 1 Ret	**OUL**; **2**; 1	**ROC**; **1**; 2	SIL; 1; 3	SNE; 1	SNE; 2	SPA; 1; 4	**SPA**; **2**; 1	BRH; 1; 4	DON; 1 Ret	3rd	129.5
2015	Ecurie Ecosse powered by Black Bull	BMW Z4 GT3	GT3	OUL; 1; 6	OUL; 2; 3	**ROC**; **1**; 1	SIL; 1; 3	SPA; 1; 4	BRH; 1; 1	SNE; 1; 8	**SNE**; **2**; 10	DON; 1 Ret		2nd	143.5
2016	Barwell Motorsport	Lamborghini Huracán GT3	GT3	BRH; 1	ROC; 1	OUL; 1	OUL; 2	SIL; 1 Ret	SPA; 1; 8	SNE; 1; 9	SNE; 2 Ret	DON; 1; 5		14th	23
2022	Century Motorsport	BMW M4 GT3	GT3	OUL; 1	OUL; 2	SIL; 1	DON; 1	SNE; 1	SNE; 2	SPA; 1	BRH; 1; 3	DON; 1; 1		11th	60

=== Complete GT World Challenge Europe Sprint Cup results ===
Year	Team	Car	Class	1	2	3	4	5	6	7	8	9	10	Pos.	Points
2016	Rowe Racing	BMW M6 GT3	Pro	MIS; QR; 2	MIS; CR; 3	BRH; QR; Ret	BRH; CR; 16	NÜR; QR; 7	NÜR; CR; 9	HUN; QR; 21	HUN; CR; 13	CAT; QR; 8	CAT; CR; 24	11th	23
2024	Madpanda Motorsport	Mercedes-AMG GT3 Evo	Pro	BRH; 1; 19	BRH; 2; 17	MIS; 1	MIS; 2	HOC; 1	HOC; 2	MAG; 1	MAG; 2	CAT; 1	CAT; 2	NC	0

=== Complete IMSA SportsCar Championship results ===
(key) (Races in bold indicate pole position) (Races in italics indicate fastest lap)

Year	Entrant	Class	Car	Engine	1	2	3	4	5	6	7	8	9	10	11	Rank	Points
2017	BMW Team RLL	GTLM	BMW M6 GTLM	BMW 4.4 L Turbo V8	DAY; 8	SEB; 6	LBH; 4	COA; 2	WGL; 1	MOS; 1	LIM; 6	ELK; 6	VIR; 4	LGA; 8	PET; 1	2nd	317
2018	BMW Team RLL	GTLM	BMW M8 GTE	BMW S63 4.0 L Twin-turbo V8	DAY; 9	**SEB**; 2	LBH; 8	MDO; 2	WGL; 7	MOS; 7	LIM; 7	ELK; 6	VIR; 1	LGA; 1	PET; 4	6th	304
2021	Corvette Racing	GTLM	Chevrolet Corvette C8.R	Chevrolet 5.5 L V8	**DAY**; 2	SEB; 5	DET	WGL	WGL	LIM	ELK	LGA	LBH	VIR	PET; 4	10th	953
2023	Whelen Engineering Racing	GTP	Cadillac V-LMDh	Cadillac LMC55R 5.5 L V8	DAY; 5	**SEB**; 1	LBH; 5	LGA; 3	WGL; 2	MOS; 7	**ELK**; 6	IMS; 4	PET; 6			1st	2733
2024	Corvette Racing by Pratt Miller Motorsports	GTD Pro	Chevrolet Corvette Z06 GT3.R	Chevrolet LT6 5.5 L V8	DAY; 5	SEB; 10	LGA; 5	**DET**; 10	WGL; 3	**MOS**; 1	ELK; 5	VIR; 9	IMS; 3	PET; 5		3rd	2934
2025	Corvette Racing by Pratt Miller Motorsports	GTD Pro	Chevrolet Corvette Z06 GT3.R	Chevrolet LT6 5.5 L V8	DAY; 2	SEB; 7	LGA; 3	DET; 2	WGL; 2	MOS; 4	ELK; 4	VIR; 1	IMS; 4	PET; 3		1st	3265
2026	Corvette Racing by Pratt Miller Motorsports	GTD Pro	Chevrolet Corvette Z06 GT3.R	Chevrolet LT6.R 5.5 L V8	**DAY**; 13	SEB; 4	LGA; 4	**DET**; 1	WGL; 4	MOS; 9	ELK; 10	VIR; 10	IMS; 4	PET; 8		8th	2776

=== Complete Formula E results ===
(key) (Races in bold indicate pole position; races in italics indicate fastest lap)

Year	Team	Chassis	Powertrain	1	2	3	4	5	6	7	8	9	10	11	12	13	14	15	16	Pos	Points
2018–19	BMW i Andretti Motorsport	Spark SRT05e	BMW iFE.18	ADR; 18	MRK; 4	SCL; 7	MEX; 14	HKG; Ret	SYX; Ret	RME; 17	PAR; Ret	MCO; 13	BER; 7	BRN; 11	NYC; 4	**NYC**; 2				13th	57
2019–20	BMW i Andretti Motorsport	Spark SRT05e	BMW iFE.20	**DIR**; 8	**DIR**; 1	SCL; Ret	MEX; 5	MRK; Ret	BER; 9	BER; 19	BER; 10	BER; 13	BER; 11	BER; 13						13th	49
2020–21	Mahindra Racing	Spark SRT05e	Mahindra M7Electro	DIR; 7	DIR; 15	RME; Ret	RME; 2	VLC; DSQ	VLC; 23	MCO; Ret	PUE; 4	PUE; Ret	NYC; Ret	NYC; 6	LDN; Ret	LDN; 16	BER; 17	BER; 5		19th	54
2021–22	Mahindra Racing	Spark SRT05e	Mahindra M8Electro	DRH; 14	DRH; Ret	MEX; Ret	RME; 12	RME; Ret	MCO; 11	BER; 9	BER; 18	JAK; 15	MRK; 14	NYC; 14	NYC; 4	LDN; 13	LDN; 11	SEO; Ret	SEO; 12	17th	14

=== Complete FIA World Endurance Championship results ===
(key) (Races in bold indicate pole position; races in italics indicate fastest lap)

Year	Entrant	Class	Chassis	Engine	1	2	3	4	5	6	7	8	Rank	Points
2018–19	BMW Team MTEK	LMGTE Pro	BMW M8 GTE	BMW S63 4.0 L Turbo V8	SPA	LMS; Ret	SIL	FUJ	SHA	SEB; 2	SPA	LMS	19th	23
2022	Corvette Racing	LMGTE Pro	Chevrolet Corvette C8.R	Chevrolet 5.5 L V8	SEB	SPA	**LMS**; Ret	MNZ	FUJ	BHR			28th	1

Sporting positions
Preceded by Tom Blomqvist; Oliver Jarvis	IMSA SportsCar Championship; Champion; 2023; With: Pipo Derani	Succeeded by Felipe Nasr; Dane Cameron
Preceded by Tom Blomqvist; Oliver Jarvis	Michelin Endurance Cup; Champion; 2023; With: Pipo Derani & Jack Aitken	Succeeded by Felipe Nasr; Dane Cameron
Preceded by Laurin Heinrich	IMSA SportsCar Championship; GTD Pro Champion; 2025; With: Antonio García	Succeeded by Connor De Phillippi; Neil Verhagen
Awards
Preceded by Stefan Wilson	McLaren Autosport BRDC Award; 2008	Succeeded by Dean Smith
