= Adam Christodoulou =

British and Greek racing driver (born 1989)

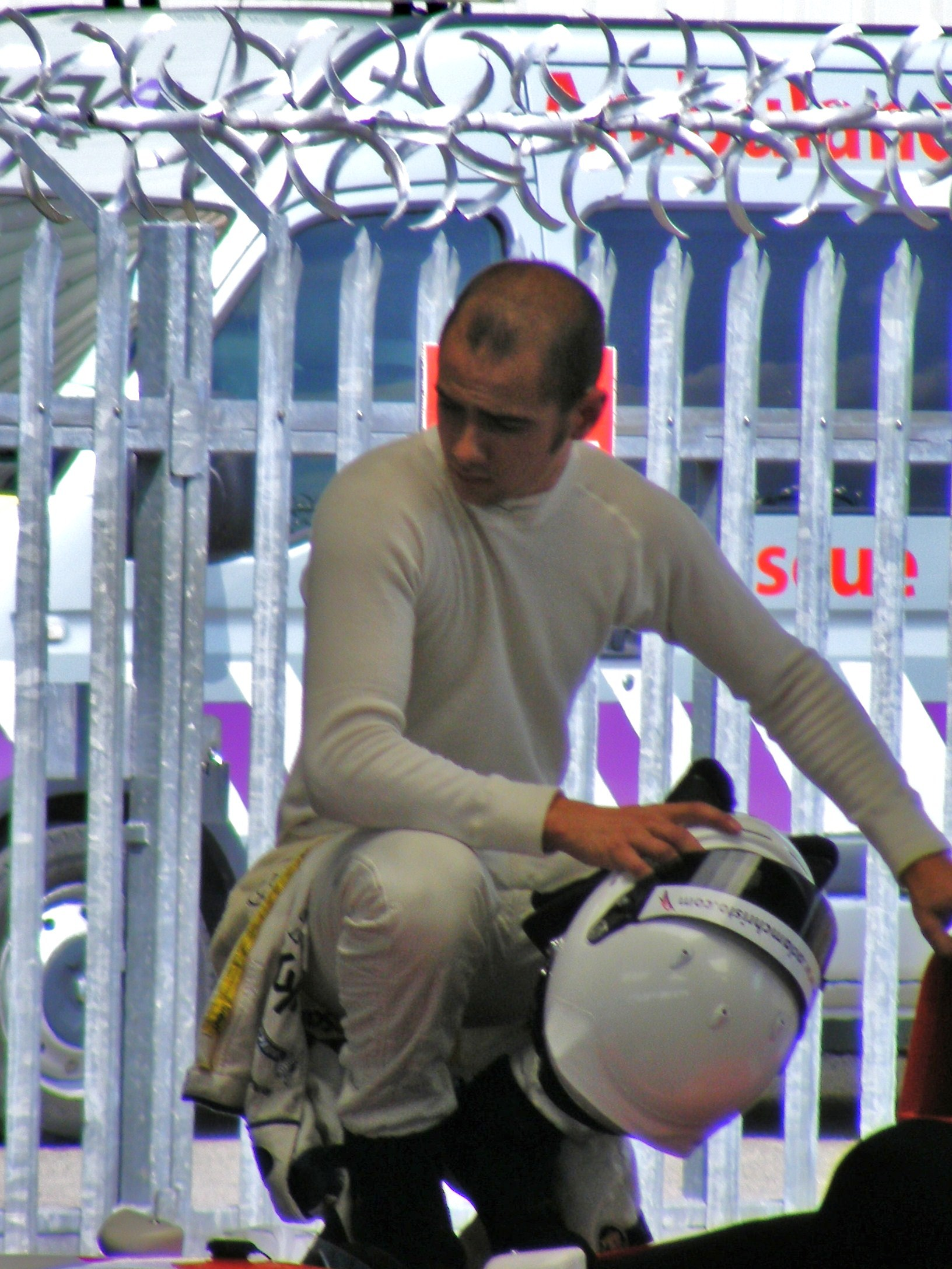
- Christodoulou as his Formula Renault car is inspected at Oulton Park.
- Nationality: British
- Born: Adam Robert Christodoulou; 11 June 1989 (age 37) Lichfield, Staffordshire
- Relatives: Riki Christodoulou (cousin)

Rolex Sports Car Series career
- Debut season: 2010
- Current team: SpeedSource/Newman Wachs Racing
- Categorisation: FIA Gold
- Car number: 68

Previous series
- 2006–2008 2007 2009: Formula Renault UK; Formula Renault NEC; Star Mazda

Championship titles
- 2008 2009: Formula Renault UK; Star Mazda

Adam Robert Christodoulou (born 11 June 1989) is a British and Greek racing driver who competes in the Nürburgring Langstrecken-Serie for Team GetSpeed as a factory driver for Mercedes.

Christodoulou is known for his successes at the Nürburgring 24 Hours, which include an overall win in 2016. In his junior career, he won the 2008 British Formula Renault Championship and the 2009 Star Mazda Championship. His cousin Riki Christodoulou is also a racing driver, having competed in British Formula 3 Championship.

== Early life ==
Christodoulou was born in Lichfield to a British mother and a half-Greek, half-German father.

== Career ==
=== Karting ===
Christodoulou began his racing career in karting in Britain. His first competitive success came in the 2001 Kartmasters British Grand Prix - comer cadet where he came first in class, the first of many accolades in his burgeoning career.

However in 2006, an MSA court found that Christodoulou had competed in a meeting at Rowrah on 5 June 2005 using illegally-modified engines. These had been modified by Peter Christodoulou whose actions resulted in a fine of £30,000.

=== Formula Renault ===
Christodoulou began his career in single seater racing in the 2006 Formula Renault UK Winter Series and gained fourth place at Croft round 2, race 1 and managed a fastest lap at Croft round 2, race 2.

In the 2007 British Formula Renault Championship, Christodoulou had the most podium finishes in Europe and the UK out of any rookie driver, he came fourth overall and won the coveted graduate cup with a prize of £15,000. (He came behind Duncan Tappy, Dean Smith and Will Bratt). During this year, he was invited to become a BRDC young driver.

During the Formula Renault 2.0 UK Winter Series 2007, Christodoulou finished third.

In 2007, Christodoulou also competed in the Formula Renault 2.0 Northern European Cup, and although he only took part in four rounds, he still gained podium finishes and came eighth out of 44.

Back in the British Formula Renault Championship for 2008, Christodoulou finished the season with seven wins, four new lap records and 11 podium finishes. On 21 September, he secured the UK Formula Renault 2.0 Championship title with 472 points.

During this year, Christodoulou's team, CR Scuderia, was managed by Andrew Kirkaldy who races the FIA GT and the team principal, Chris Niarchos, of the Cobra Group also races in the FIA GT series alongside Tim Mullen and Rob Bell of the CR Scuderia team.

In December 2008, Christodoulou was one of six finalists for the prestigious McLaren Autosport BRDC Award, and won the Autosport Awards British Club Driver 2008.

=== Star Mazda ===
In 2009, Christodoulou competed in the Star Mazda series, a single seater class in the US, and won the championship, with three wins and nine podium finishes. He has again been nominated for the McLaren Autosport BRDC Award. He would test an Indy Lights car for Sam Schmidt Motorsports in October 2009 after having previously tested for Bryan Herta Autosport in the same series.

=== Sports cars ===
For 2010, Christodoulou ran in the Rolex Sports Car Series GT class for Newman Wachs Racing with co-driver John Edwards.

=== Endurance racing ===
==== 2011–2021: Blancpain Endurance Series ====
Christodoulou competed in the 2013 Blancpain Endurance Series driving for Black Falcon. He finished sixth in the Pro-Am class, with a class podium coming in the opening race at Monza. Alongside his Blancpain drive, Christodoulou competed in the 2013 VLN Series, where his results included a stream of three podiums in a row.

2014 was Christodoulou's first year participating in the 24 Hours of Nürburgring in the top class, SP9. However, he retired from the race after 14 hours as a wheel fell off the car. He attempted to make repairs himself but was unable to do so.

In 2016, Christodoulou took his first win in the 24 Hours of Nürburgring, driving for Black Falcon with Maro Engel, Manuel Metzger and Bernd Schneider. The team started from the ninth row, but they drove a clean race during wet conditions, and an overtake from Engel on the final lap saw them stand on the top step of the podium.

Christodoulou entered the 2017 Blancpain GT Series Endurance Cup with the Black Falcon team. He finished nineteenth overall in the standings, including an eighth-place finish at the 24 Hours of Spa. He also returned to the British GT Championship, joining Team ABBA for the second half of the season, where he took a best result of fifth at Silverstone.

After the COVID-19 pandemic prevented the majority of motorsports events from taking place in early 2020, Christodoulou returned to a racecar for the Nürburgring Langstrecken-Serie, taking two wins in the shortened campaign.

==== 2022: International GT Open ====
For the 2022 season, Christodoulou partnered with Reema Juffali in the International GT Open, driving for Juffali's Theeba Motorsport team. The pair took four class wins and three overall podiums during the campaign, finishing as runners-up in the Pro-Am class.

==== 2023–2024: GT World Challenge ====
After winning the opening race of the prelude, Christodoulou finished fourth in the 24 Hours of Nürburgring, having led the race at some points in the first twelve hours. He then competed in the second half of the 2023 GT World Challenge America for Bartone Bros Racing with RealTime, partnering Anthony Bartone. Together, the pair finished 12th in the Pro/Am class, with their best result being a class podium (and sixth overall) in the second race at Road America. He ended the year in the Greater Bay Area GT4 Cup, held as part of the Macau Grand Prix events, claiming second place in the international debut for the Lotus Emira GT4 after qualifying on pole.

Christodoulou entered the opening round of the 2024 GT World Challenge Europe Endurance Cup for Boutsen VDS, which he finished in 16th. He then returned to the 24 Hours of Nürburgring, performing double duty in the two Team Getspeed SP9 cars. However, he would suffer misfortune in both, with the No. 130 retiring due to suspension damage and the #8 following soon after when Christodoulou left the track and damaged the air filter.

==== 2025: Nürburgring Langstrecken-Serie ====
In 2025, Christodoulou moved to the Nürburgring Langstrecken-Serie, driving for Mercedes-AMG Team Getspeed in the SP9 class. He was also named as an 'expert driver' for the Mercedes factory team. He began the season with an appearance at the Bathurst 12 Hour, driving in the GT4 category for Team Nineteen, and finished the race in 16th overall. In the 24 Hours of Nürburgring, his team ran near the front of the pack for much of the race, but ultimately finished forty laps behind the leaders after making multiple long stops for repairs.

== Other information ==
Christodoulou competed in the "race4charity" celebrity kart race organised by BP Ultimate at the Autosport International show in 2008. He broke the lap record and his team won the charity event where they raced against such drivers as Allan McNish, Paul di Resta, Sam Bird and Nathan Caratti amongst others.

== Racing record ==
=== Career summary ===
| Season | Series | Team Name | Races | Wins | Poles | F/Laps | Podiums | Points | Position |
|---|---|---|---|---|---|---|---|---|---|
| 2006 | Formula Renault 2.0 UK Winter Series | AKA Lemac | 4 | 0 | 0 | 1 | 0 | 43 | 10th |
| 2007 | Formula Renault 2.0 UK Championship | AKA Cobra Racing | 20 | 0 | 3 | 0 | 6 | 384 | 4th |
| 2007 | Formula Renault 2.0 Northern European Cup | AKA Cobra Racing | 8 | 0 | 0 | 0 | 3 | 137 | 8th |
| 2007 | Formula Renault 2.0 UK Winter Cup | AKA Cobra | 4 | 1 | 0 | 0 | 2 | 82 | **3rd** |
| 2008 | Formula Renault 2.0 UK Championship | CR Scuderia | 20 | 7 | 6 | 4 | 11 | 472 | **1st** |
| 2009 | Star Mazda Championship | JDC MotorSports | 13 | 3 | 2 | 5 | 9 | 473 | **1st** |
| 2009 | Eurocup Formula Renault 2.0 | MP Motorsport | 2 | 0 | 0 | 0 | 0 | 0 | 38th |
| 2010 | International GT Open | CRS Racing | 4 | 0 | 0 | 0 | 2 | 40 | 28th |
| 2010 | Rolex Sports Car Series - GT | SpeedSource Newman Wachs Racing | 11 | 1 | 0 | 0 | 4 | 297 | 6th |
| 2011 | Blancpain Endurance Series - Pro | McLaren GT | 1 | 0 | 0 | 0 | 0 | 1 | 33rd |
| 2011 | Blancpain Endurance Series - Pro-Am | McLaren GT | 2 | 0 | 0 | 0 | 0 | 0 | NC |
| 2011 | Le Mans Series - GTE Am | CRS Racing | 5 | 0 | 0 | 0 | 1 | 36 | 4th |
| 2011 | Rolex Sports Car Series - GT | SpeedSource | 1 | 0 | 0 | 0 | 0 | 25 | 49th |
| 2011 | Ferrari Challenge Europe - Trofeo Pirelli | | ? | ? | ? | ? | ? | 18 | 10th |
| 2011 | 24 Hours of Nürburgring - SP10 | Sponsorcard: Bonk Motorsport | 1 | 0 | 0 | 0 | 0 | N/A | DNF |
| 2012 | Blancpain Endurance Series - Pro-Am | Lapidus Racing | 1 | 0 | 0 | 0 | 0 | 6 | 34th |
| 2012 | Blancpain Endurance Series - Pro-Am | GT3 Racing | 1 | 0 | 0 | 0 | 0 | 6 | 34th |
| 2012 | International GT Open | Lapidus Racing | 6 | 0 | 0 | 0 | 0 | 30 | 20th |
| 2012 | 24 Hours of Nürburgring - SP10 | | 1 | 0 | 0 | 0 | 1 | N/A | **3rd** |
| 2013 | Blancpain Endurance Series - Pro-Am | Black Falcon | 4 | 0 | 1 | 1 | 2 | 50 | 6th |
| 2013 | British GT Championship - GT4 | PROsport Performance | 1 | 1 | 0 | 0 | 1 | 37.5 | 9th |
| 2013 | GT4 European Trophy | PROsport Performance | 8 | 1 | 0 | 0 | 2 | 97 | **3rd** |
| 2013 | HDI-Gerling Dutch GT | PROsport Performance | 6 | 0 | 0 | 0 | 1 | ? | ? |
| 2014 | Blancpain Endurance Series - Pro | Black Falcon | 1 | 0 | 0 | 0 | 0 | 9 | 19th |
| 2014 | 24 Hours of Nürburgring - SP9 | Black Falcon | 1 | 0 | 0 | 0 | 0 | N/A | DNF |
| 2015 | Blancpain Endurance Series - Pro | Black Falcon | 1 | 0 | 0 | 0 | 0 | 0 | NC |
| 2015 | 24 Hours of Nürburgring - SP9 | Black Falcon | 1 | 0 | 0 | 0 | 0 | N/A | DNF |
| 2015 | 24H Series - A6 | Ram Racing | 3 | 1 | 1 | 0 | 3 | 75 | 9th |
| 2016 | Blancpain GT Series Endurance Cup | Black Falcon | 5 | 0 | 0 | 0 | 0 | 6 | 39th |
| 2016 | 24H Series - A6 | Black Falcon | | | | | | | |
| 2016 | 24 Hours of Nürburgring - SP9 | AMG - Team Black Falcon | 1 | 1 | 0 | 0 | 1 | N/A | **1st** |
| 2017 | Blancpain GT Series Endurance Cup | Mercedes-AMG Team Black Falcon | 5 | 0 | 1 | 0 | 0 | 19 | 19th |
| 2017 | 24 Hours of Nürburgring - SP9 | Mercedes-AMG Team Black Falcon | 1 | 0 | 0 | 0 | 0 | N/A | 5th |
| 2017 | British GT Championship - GT3 | Team ABBA with Rollcentre Racing | 5 | 0 | 0 | 0 | 0 | 42 | 11th |
| 2017 | Intercontinental GT Challenge | Black Falcon | 1 | 0 | 0 | 0 | 0 | 4 | 14th |
| 2017 | IMSA SportsCar Championship - GTD | Riley Motorsports - Team AMG | 1 | 0 | 0 | 0 | 1 | 30 | 57th |
| 2017 | Touring Car Endurance Series - SP3-GT4 | Mercedes-AMG Testteam Black Falcon | | | | | | | |
| 2018 | Blancpain GT Series Endurance Cup | Mercedes-AMG Team AKKA ASP | 2 | 0 | 0 | 0 | 1 | 33 | 14th |
| 2018 | Blancpain GT Series Sprint Cup | AKKA ASP Team | 2 | 0 | 0 | 0 | 0 | 7.5 | 20th |
| 2018 | British GT Championship - GT3 | Team ABBA Racing | 2 | 0 | 0 | 0 | 0 | 0 | NC† |
| 2018 | IMSA SportsCar Championship - GTD | Mercedes-AMG Team Riley Motorsports | 1 | 0 | 0 | 0 | 0 | 28 | 49th |
| 2018 | China GT Championship - GT3 | | 2 | 1 | ? | 1 | 1 | 25 | 17th |
| 2018 | V de V Endurance Series - LMP3 | Inter Europol Competition | 1 | 0 | 0 | 0 | 0 | ? | ? |
| 2018 | 24H GT Series - A6 | PROsport Performance | | | | | | | |
| 2018 | 24 Hours of Nürburgring - SP9 | Mercedes-AMG Team Black Falcon | 1 | 0 | 0 | 0 | 1 | N/A | **2nd** |
| 2019 | Blancpain GT Series Endurance Cup | Goodsmile Racing & Type-Moon Racing | 1 | 0 | 0 | 0 | 0 | 0 | NC |
| 2019 | British GT Championship - GT3 | Team ABBA Racing | 7 | 0 | 0 | 0 | 1 | 42 | 17th |
| 2019 | Intercontinental GT Challenge | Strakka Racing | 1 | 0 | 0 | 0 | 0 | 1 | 37th |
| 2019 | China GT Championship - GT3 | Toro Racing x JCDCR | 7 | 3 | 1 | 1 | 6 | 120 | 5th |
| 2019 | 24H GT Series - A6 | Black Falcon | | | | | | | |
| 2019 | 24 Hours of Nürburgring - SP9 | Mercedes-AMG Team Black Falcon | 1 | 0 | 0 | 0 | 0 | N/A | DNF |
| 2019 | The Hankook 25 Hours VW Fun Cup | DRM Family | 1 | 0 | 0 | 0 | 0 | N/A | 20th |
| 2020 | 24 Hours of Nürburgring - SP9 | Mercedes-AMG Team HRT | 1 | 0 | 0 | 0 | 0 | N/A | DNF |
| 2021 | GT World Challenge Europe Sprint Cup | Ram Racing | 2 | 0 | 0 | 0 | 0 | 0 | NC |
| 2021 | DTM Trophy | PROsport Racing | 0 | 0 | 0 | 0 | 0 | 0 | NC |
| 2021 | 24H GT Series - GT4 | Dragon Racing | | | | | | | |
| 2021 | 24 Hours of Nürburgring - SP9 | Mercedes-AMG Team HRT Bilstein | 1 | 0 | 0 | 0 | 0 | N/A | DNF |
| 2022 | International GT Open | Theeba Motorsport | 10 | 0 | 1 | 0 | 3 | 51 | 6th |
| 2022 | 24 Hours of Nürburgring - SP9 | Mercedes-AMG Team GetSpeed BWT | 1 | 0 | 0 | 0 | 1 | N/A | **2nd** |
| 2023 | GT World Challenge America - Pro-Am | Bartone Bros Racing with RealTime | 6 | 0 | 0 | 1 | 1 | 53 | 12th |
| 2023 | GT Cup Open Europe | Volcano Motorsport | 1 | 1 | 0 | 0 | 1 | 30 | 12th |
| 2023 | 24H GT Series - 992 | HRT Performance | 2 | 1 | 1 | 0 | 1 | 64 | 5th* |
| 2023 | 24 Hours of Nürburgring - SP9 | Mercedes-AMG Team GetSpeed | 1 | 0 | 0 | 0 | 0 | N/A | 4th |
| 2024 | GT World Challenge Europe Endurance Cup | Boutsen VDS | 1 | 0 | 0 | 0 | 0 | 0 | NC |
| 2024 | IMSA SportsCar Championship - GTD | Lone Star Racing | 1 | 0 | 0 | 0 | 0 | 241 | 57th |
| 2024 | Nürburgring Langstrecken-Serie - SP9 | PROsport-Racing | 1 | | | | | | |
| 2024 | Nürburgring Langstrecken-Serie - SP9 | Mercedes-AMG Team GetSpeed | 2 | | | | | | |
| 2024 | Intercontinental GT Challenge | Mercedes-AMG Team GetSpeed | 1 | 0 | 0 | 0 | 0 | 0 | NC |
| 2024 | 24 Hours of Nürburgring - SP9 | Mercedes-AMG Team GetSpeed | 1 | 0 | 0 | 0 | 0 | N/A | DNF |
| 2024 | Nürburgring Langstrecken-Serie - Cup2 | Black Falcon | | | | | | | |
| 2024 | 992 Endurance Cup | Toro Racing by HRT Performance | 1 | 0 | 0 | 0 | 0 | N/A | 15th |
| 2025 | Nürburgring Langstrecken-Serie - SP9 | Mercedes-AMG Team GetSpeed | 3 | 0 | 0 | 0 | 0 | 6 | NC |
| 2025 | 24 Hours of Nürburgring - SP9 | Mercedes-AMG Team GetSpeed | 1 | 0 | 0 | 0 | 0 | N/A | 70th |
| 2025 | GT World Challenge Europe Endurance Cup | Nordique Racing | 2 | 0 | 0 | 0 | 0 | 0 | NC |
| 2025 | Gulf 12 Hours | Capital RT by Motopark | 1 | 1 | 0 | 0 | 1 | N/A | **1st** |
| 2026 | European Le Mans Series - LMGT3 | Team Qatar by Iron Lynx | 1 | 0 | 1 | 0 | 0 | 13 | 26th |
| 2026 | Nürburgring Langstrecken-Serie - SP9 | Era Motorsport | | | | | | * | * |
| 2026 | Nürburgring Langstrecken-Serie - SP9 | PROsport Racing Team Bilstein | 3 | | | | | * | * |
| 2026 | Nürburgring Langstrecken-Serie - SP9 | PROsport Racing | | | | | | * | * |
| 2026 | 24 Hours of Nürburgring - SP9 | PROsport Racing Team Bilstein | 1 | 0 | 0 | 0 | 0 | N/A | DNF |
| 2026 | GT World Challenge Europe Endurance Cup | Grupo Prom Racing Team | 1 | 0 | 0 | 0 | 0 | 0 | NC |

† As Christodoulou was a guest driver, he was ineligible to score points.

=== Complete Formula Renault 2.0 NEC results ===
(key) (Races in bold indicate pole position; races in italics indicate fastest lap)

| Year | Entrant | 1 | 2 | 3 | 4 | 5 | 6 | 7 | 8 | 9 | 10 | 11 | 12 | 13 | 14 | 15 | 16 | DC | Points |
|---|---|---|---|---|---|---|---|---|---|---|---|---|---|---|---|---|---|---|---|
| 2007 | AKA Cobra Racing | ZAN; 1; 5 | ZAN; 2; 9 | OSC; 1 | OSC; 2 | ASS; 1; 6 | ASS; 2; 3 | ZOL; 1 | ZOL; 1 | NUR; 1; 5 | NUR; 2; 4 | OSC; 1 | OSC; 2 | SPA; 1 | SPA; 2 | HOC; 1; 3 | HOC; 2; 3 | 8th | 137 |

=== Complete Eurocup Formula Renault 2.0 results ===
(key) (Races in bold indicate pole position; races in italics indicate fastest lap)

| Year | Entrant | 1 | 2 | 3 | 4 | 5 | 6 | 7 | 8 | 9 | 10 | 11 | 12 | 13 | 14 | DC | Points |
|---|---|---|---|---|---|---|---|---|---|---|---|---|---|---|---|---|---|
| 2009 | MP Motorsport | CAT; 1 | CAT; 2 | SPA; 1; 25 | SPA; 2; 18 | HUN; 1 | HUN; 2 | SIL; 1 | SIL; 2 | LMS; 1 | LMS; 2 | NÜR; 1 | NÜR; 2 | ALC; 1 | ALC; 2 | 38th | 0 |

=== Complete Star Mazda Championship results ===
(key) (Races in bold indicate pole position; races in italics indicate fastest lap)

| Year | Team | 1 | 2 | 3 | 4 | 5 | 6 | 7 | 8 | 9 | 10 | 11 | 12 | 13 | Rank | Points |
|---|---|---|---|---|---|---|---|---|---|---|---|---|---|---|---|---|
| 2009 | JDC MotorSports | SEB; 1 | **VIR**; 7 | **MMP**; 1 | NJ1; 2 | NJ2; 25 | WIS; 2 | IOW; 5 | ILL; 2 | ILL; 2 | QUE; 5 | ONT; 3 | ATL; 3 | LAG; 1 | **1st** | **473** |

=== Complete European Le Mans Series results ===
(key) (Races in bold indicate pole position; races in italics indicate fastest lap)

| Year | Entrant | Class | Chassis | Engine | 1 | 2 | 3 | 4 | 5 | 6 | Rank | Points |
|---|---|---|---|---|---|---|---|---|---|---|---|---|
| 2011 | CRS Racing | LMGTE Am | Ferrari F430 GT2 | Ferrari F136 GT 4.0 L V8 | LEC; 4 | SPA; Ret | IMO; 4 | SIL; 9 | EST; 2 | | 4th | 36 |
| 2026 | Team Qatar by Iron Lynx | LMGT3 | Mercedes-AMG GT3 Evo | Mercedes-AMG M159 6.2 L V8 | **CAT**; 4 | LEC | IMO | SPA | SIL | ALG | 26th | 13 |

=== Complete GT World Challenge Europe results ===
==== GT World Challenge Europe Endurance Cup ====
(key) (Races in bold indicate pole position; races in italics indicate fastest lap)

| Year | Team | Car | Class | 1 | 2 | 3 | 4 | 5 | 6 | 7 | 8 | Pos. | Points |
|---|---|---|---|---|---|---|---|---|---|---|---|---|---|
| 2011 | McLaren GT | McLaren MP4-12C GT3 | Pro-Am | MNZ | NAV | SPA; 6H; 28 | SPA; 12H; 42 | SPA; 24H; 25 | MAG; Ret | | | NC | 0 |
| 2011 | McLaren GT | McLaren MP4-12C GT3 | Pro | | | | | | | SIL; 19† | | 33rd | 1 |
| 2012 | Lapidus Racing | McLaren MP4-12C GT3 | Pro-Am | MNZ | SIL | LEC | SPA; 6H; 55 | SPA; 12H; Ret | SPA; 24H; Ret | | | 34th | 6 |
| 2012 | GT3 Racing | Audi R8 LMS | Pro-Am | | | | | | | NÜR; 17 | NAV | 34th | 6 |
| 2013 | Black Falcon | Mercedes-Benz SLS AMG GT3 | Pro-Am | MNZ; 9 | SIL; 47 | **LEC**; 50† | SPA; 24H; 30 | SPA; 24H; 18 | SPA; 24H; 8 | NÜR; 13 | | 6th | 50 |
| 2014 | Black Falcon | Mercedes-Benz SLS AMG GT3 | Pro | MNZ | SIL | LEC | SPA; 6H; 15 | SPA; 12H; 11 | SPA; 24H; 11 | NÜR | | 19th | 9 |
| 2015 | Black Falcon | Mercedes-Benz SLS AMG GT3 | Pro | MNZ | SIL | LEC | SPA; 6H; 44 | SPA; 12H; 48 | SPA; 24H; Ret | NÜR | | NC | 0 |
| 2016 | Black Falcon | Mercedes-AMG GT3 | Pro | MNZ; 7 | SIL; 11 | LEC; 34 | SPA; 6H; 12 | SPA; 12H; 14 | SPA; 24H; 33 | NÜR; 18 | | 39th | 6 |
| 2017 | Mercedes-AMG Team Black Falcon | Mercedes-AMG GT3 | Pro | MNZ; 10 | SIL; Ret | **LEC**; 33 | SPA; 6H; 13 | SPA; 12H; 7 | SPA; 24H; 8 | CAT; 5 | | 19th | 19 |
| 2018 | Mercedes-AMG Team AKKA ASP | Mercedes-AMG GT3 | Pro | MNZ | SIL; 2 | LEC; 4 | SPA; 6H | SPA; 12H | SPA; 24H | CAT | | 14th | 33 |
| 2019 | Goodsmile Racing & Type-Moon Racing | Mercedes-AMG GT3 | Pro | MNZ | SIL | LEC | SPA; 6H; 34 | SPA; 12H; 55 | SPA; 24H; Ret | CAT | | NC | 0 |
| 2024 | Boutsen VDS | Mercedes-AMG GT3 Evo | Pro | LEC; 16 | SPA; 6H | SPA; 12H | SPA; 24H | NÜR | MNZ | JED | | NC | 0 |
| 2025 | Nordique Racing | Mercedes-AMG GT3 Evo | Pro | LEC | MNZ | SPA; 6H | SPA; 12H | SPA; 24H | NÜR; 52† | CAT; 30 | | NC | 0 |
| 2026 | Grupo Prom Racing Team | Mercedes-AMG GT3 Evo | Pro-Am | LEC | MNZ | SPA; 6H; 63† | SPA; 12H; 63† | SPA; 24H; Ret | NÜR | ALG | | NC | 0 |

==== GT World Challenge Europe Sprint Cup ====
(key) (Races in bold indicate pole position; races in italics indicate fastest lap)

| Year | Team | Car | Class | 1 | 2 | 3 | 4 | 5 | 6 | 7 | 8 | 9 | 10 | Pos. | Points |
|---|---|---|---|---|---|---|---|---|---|---|---|---|---|---|---|
| 2018 | AKKA ASP Team | Mercedes-AMG GT3 | Pro | ZOL; 1 | ZOL; 2 | BRH; 1 | BRH; 2 | MIS; 1 | MIS; 2 | HUN; 1 | HUN; 2 | NÜR; 1; 7 | NÜR; 2; 6 | 20th | 7.5 |
| 2021 | RAM Racing | Mercedes-AMG GT3 Evo | Pro-Am | MAG; 1 | MAG; 2 | ZAN; 1 | ZAN; 2 | MIS; 1 | MIS; 2 | BRH; 1; 27 | BRH; 2 Ret | VAL; 1 | VAL; 2 | 5th | 6 |

=== Complete IMSA SportsCar Championship results ===
(key) (Races in bold indicate pole position; results in italics indicate fastest lap)

| Year | Team | Class | Make | Engine | 1 | 2 | 3 | 4 | 5 | 6 | 7 | 8 | 9 | 10 | 11 | 12 | Pos. | Points |
|---|---|---|---|---|---|---|---|---|---|---|---|---|---|---|---|---|---|---|
| 2017 | Riley Motorsports - Team AMG | GTD | Mercedes-AMG GT3 | Mercedes-AMG M159 6.2 L V8 | DAY; 3 | SEB | LBH | AUS | DET | WGL | MOS | LIM | ELK | VIR | LGA | PET | 57th | 30 |
| 2018 | Mercedes-AMG Team Riley Motorsports | GTD | Mercedes-AMG GT3 | Mercedes-AMG M159 6.2 L V8 | DAY; 4 | SEB | MOH | BEL | WGL | MOS | LIM | ELK | VIR | LGA | PET | | 49th | 28 |
| 2024 | Lone Star Racing | GTD | Mercedes-AMG GT3 Evo | Mercedes-AMG M159 6.2 L V8 | DAY; 8 | SEB | LBH | LGA | WGL | MOS | ELK | VIR | IMS | PET | | | 57th | 241 |

Sporting positions
| Preceded by John Edwards | Star Mazda Championship Champion; 2009 | Succeeded by Conor Daly |
| Preceded by Duncan Tappy | Formula Renault UK Champion; 2008 | Succeeded by Dean Smith |
Awards and achievements
| Preceded by Duncan Tappy | Autosport British Club Driver of the Year; 2008 | Succeeded by Sarah Moore |
