= 2009 Formula Renault 2.0 UK Championship =

Motor racing competition

Seasons
- ← 2008 2010 →

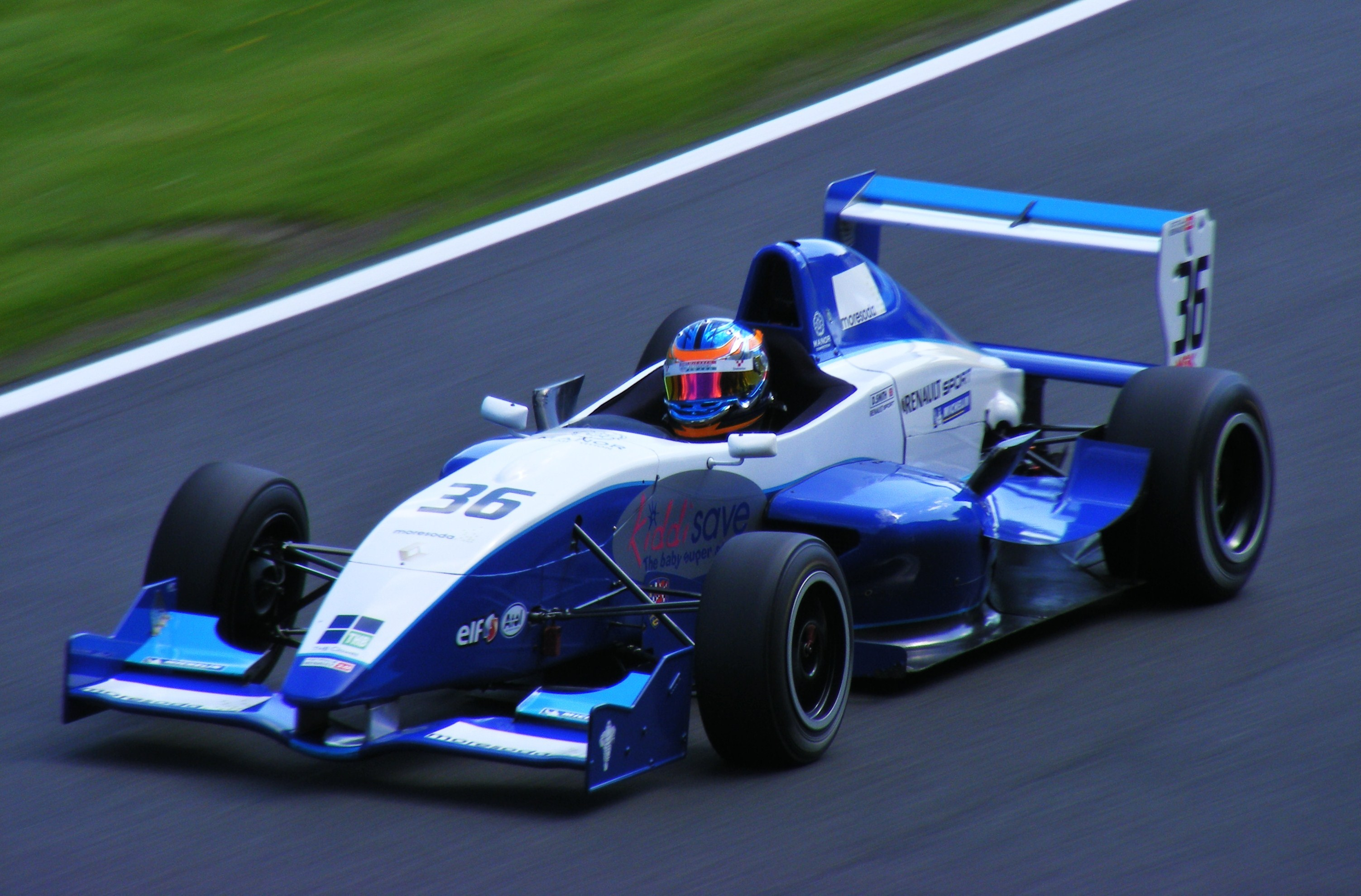
Despite missing the opening round of the series at Brands Hatch, Dean Smith won the title ahead of James Calado and Oliver Webb.

The 2009 Formula Renault 2.0 UK Championship was the 21st British Formula Renault Championship. The season began at Brands Hatch on 5 April and ended at the same venue on 4 October, after twenty rounds held in England. Dean Smith won the title, despite missing the opening rounds of the series. Harry Tincknell won the Graduate Cup for first-year drivers.

== Formula Renault UK season ==
=== Background ===
Despite initial fears of the 2008 financial crisis causing a lack of entries into the championship, the series' grid increased from the previous season with a total of 26 entries prior to the championship's opening race at Brands Hatch. Most of the pre-season anticipation centred around the two championship favourites: Fortec Motorsport's James Calado and Alpine Motorsport's Dean Stoneman, both in their second season and boasting victories in their début season in the series, with pre-season testing further backing media predictions that the championship would most likely be decided between the pair. The series swelled to 29, for the second meeting at Thruxton.

=== Teams and drivers ===
2009 Entry List
Team	No.	Driver name	Class	Rounds
CRS Racing	1	(United Kingdom) Harry Tincknell	G	All
CRS Racing	4	(Finland) Matias Laine	G	1–6
CRS Racing	4	(United Kingdom) Euan Hankey		8–10
CRS Racing	6	(Australia) Joshua Scott		All
CRS Racing	17	(United Kingdom) Lewis Williamson		All
Privateer	2	(United Kingdom) Michael Lyons	G	All
R S Racing	3	(United Kingdom) Ryan Singleton	G	All
Hill Speed Racing	5	(Bahrain) Menasheh Idafar	G	1–7
Hill Speed Racing	8	(United Kingdom) Lee Dwyer	G	1–6
Alpine Motorsport	7	(United Kingdom) Dean Stoneman		All
Alpine Motorsport	19	(Bahrain) Isa Yousif	G	All
Manor Competition	9	(Netherlands) Thomas Hylkema		All
Manor Competition	10	(United Kingdom) David McDonald		All
Manor Competition	15	(United Kingdom) Alice Powell	G	All
Manor Competition	36	(United Kingdom) Dean Smith		2–10
Fortec Motorsport	11	(United Kingdom) James Calado		All
Fortec Motorsport	26	(Sweden) Fredrik Blomstedt		All
Fortec Motorsport	27	(United Kingdom) Oliver Webb		All
Fortec Motorsport	28	(United Kingdom) Will Stevens	G	All
Hitech Junior Team	12	(United Kingdom) Nick Yelloly	G	All
Hitech Junior Team	20	(United Kingdom) Jordan Oakes		All
Hitech Junior Team	21	(Hungary) Tamás Pál Kiss	G	All
Hitech Junior Team	22	(Philippines) Marlon Stöckinger	G	All
Mark Burdett Motorsport	14	(Poland) Mateusz Adamski		9
Mark Burdett Motorsport	25	(Finland) Jesse Krohn		All
Mark Burdett Motorsport	29	(United Kingdom) James Dixon		2–4
TA1 Motorsport	16	(United Kingdom) Tom Armour		1–7
Tempus Sport	18	(Russia) Max Snegirev		5
Tempus Sport	23	(Ukraine) Maksym Dmytrenko		1–6
Tempus Sport	24	(Croatia) Sasha Radola		2–6
Falcon Motorsport	33	(United Kingdom) Jordan Williams	G	2–3
Privateer	99	(United Kingdom) Jordan Williams	G	6
Apotex Scorpio Motorsport	44	(United Kingdom) Ollie Hancock		1–6

Icon	Class
**G**	Graduate Cup

=== Calendar ===
All races were held in United Kingdom.

Round	Circuit	Date	Pole position	Fastest lap	Winning driver	Winning team
1	Brands Hatch Indy	5 April	(United Kingdom) Harry Tincknell	(United Kingdom) Oliver Webb	(United Kingdom) Oliver Webb	Fortec Motorsport
2	Brands Hatch Indy	5 April	(United Kingdom) James Calado	(Finland) Jesse Krohn	(United Kingdom) James Calado	Fortec Motorsport
3	Thruxton	25 April	(United Kingdom) Dean Stoneman	(United Kingdom) Harry Tincknell	(United Kingdom) James Calado	Fortec Motorsport
4	Thruxton	26 April	(United Kingdom) James Calado	(Finland) Jesse Krohn	(Finland) Jesse Krohn	Mark Burdett Motorsport
5	Donington Park	17 May	(United Kingdom) Dean Smith	(Finland) Jesse Krohn	(United Kingdom) Dean Smith	Manor Competition
6	Donington Park	17 May	(United Kingdom) Dean Smith	(United Kingdom) James Calado	(United Kingdom) James Calado	Fortec Motorsport
7	Oulton Park	31 May	(United Kingdom) James Calado	(United Kingdom) Harry Tincknell	(United Kingdom) Dean Smith	Manor Competition
8	Oulton Park	31 May	(United Kingdom) Dean Smith	(United Kingdom) Dean Smith	(United Kingdom) Dean Smith	Manor Competition
9	Croft	13 June	(United Kingdom) James Calado	(United Kingdom) James Calado	(United Kingdom) James Calado	Fortec Motorsport
10	Croft	14 June	(United Kingdom) James Calado	(United Kingdom) Dean Smith	(United Kingdom) Dean Smith	Manor Competition
11	Silverstone GP	5 July	(Australia) Joshua Scott	(United Kingdom) James Calado	(Australia) Joshua Scott	CRS Racing
12	Silverstone GP	5 July	(United Kingdom) James Calado	(United Kingdom) Dean Smith	(United Kingdom) Oliver Webb	Fortec Motorsport
13	Snetterton	2 August	(United Kingdom) James Calado	(United Kingdom) James Calado	(United Kingdom) James Calado	Fortec Motorsport
14	Snetterton	2 August	(United Kingdom) Dean Smith	(United Kingdom) Dean Smith	(United Kingdom) Dean Stoneman	Alpine Motorsport
15	Silverstone National	30 August	(United Kingdom) James Calado	(United Kingdom) James Calado	(United Kingdom) James Calado	Fortec Motorsport
16	Silverstone National	30 August	(United Kingdom) James Calado	(United Kingdom) James Calado	(United Kingdom) James Calado	Fortec Motorsport
17	Rockingham	19 September	(United Kingdom) Dean Smith	(United Kingdom) Dean Smith	(United Kingdom) Dean Smith	Manor Competition
18	Rockingham	20 September	(United Kingdom) Dean Smith	(United Kingdom) Dean Smith	(United Kingdom) Dean Smith	Manor Competition
19	Brands Hatch GP	4 October	(United Kingdom) Dean Smith	(United Kingdom) Oliver Webb	(United Kingdom) Dean Smith	Manor Competition
20	Brands Hatch GP	4 October	(United Kingdom) James Calado	(United Kingdom) James Calado	(United Kingdom) James Calado	Fortec Motorsport

=== Driver standings ===
- Points are awarded to the drivers as follows:

Position	1	2	3	4	5	6	7	8	9	10	11	12	13	14	15	16	17	18	19	20	FL
Points	32	28	25	22	20	18	16	14	12	11	10	9	8	7	6	5	4	3	2	1	2

Best 18 results count towards the championship.
- T. Pts – points if all races counted.
- Drop – two dropped scores.
- Pts – best 18 results.
- G. Pts – drivers in the Graduate Cup, with the best 15 results counting.

Pos	Driver	BHI		THR		DON		OUL		CRO		SILGP		SNE		SILN		ROC		BHGP		Pts	G. Pts
Pos	Driver	1	2	3	4	5	6	7	8	9	10	11	12	13	14	15	16	17	18	19	20	Pts	G. Pts
1	(United Kingdom) Dean Smith			13	9	**1**	**2**	1	**1**	2	1	3	3	2	**2**	5	2	**1**	**1**	**1**	3	491	
2	(United Kingdom) James Calado	5	**1**	1	**Ret**	26	1	**Ret**	4	**1**	**Ret**	2	**2**	**1**	3	**1**	**1**	2	4	8	**1**	457	
3	(United Kingdom) Oliver Webb	1	7	12	5	3	5	3	2	3	3	5	1	3	5	2	8	Ret	5	2	9	419	
4	(United Kingdom) Dean Stoneman	4	6	**2**	2	5	6	18	3	4	2	4	4	5	1	3	3	3	Ret	7	4	418	
5	(United Kingdom) Harry Tincknell (G)	**2**	DNS	7	3	6	12	2	5	11	9	12	8	8	Ret	4	6	4	3	6	10	323	295
6	(Finland) Jesse Krohn	6	3	Ret	1	2	22	6	7	9	4	10	Ret	9	8	13	11	Ret	Ret	3	5	277	
7	(United Kingdom) Will Stevens (G)	9	8	3	21	12	11	8	12	7	5	7	6	20	7	12	10	7	7	14	12	247	222
8	(Australia) Joshua Scott	7	5	4	4	9	8	Ret	24	8	8	**1**	7	17	6	Ret	5	16	Ret	20	7	246	
9	(Sweden) Fredrik Blomstedt	12	2	5	7	7	17	5	6	10	6	9	14	Ret	Ret	8	12	17	8	12	17	233	
10	(United Kingdom) Lewis Williamson	14	4	10	Ret	8	3	Ret	17	5	21	14	13	4	Ret	7	13	10	17	4	2	229	
11	(United Kingdom) Jordan Oakes	3	DNS	8	6	Ret	9	Ret	9	Ret	14	6	5	14	17	10	17	8	2	16	6	217	
12	(United Kingdom) David McDonald	13	11	Ret	8	4	20	4	13	23	7	8	9	6	4	11	14	6	Ret	21	13	210	
13	(Hungary) Tamás Pál Kiss (G)	18	18	Ret	12	14	7	Ret	16	12	19	16	11	Ret	13	14	7	9	14	9	11	141	136
14	(Finland) Matias Laine (G)	8	16	6	11	11	19	9	8	6	10	11	10									135	135
15	(Bahrain) Isa Yousif (G)	17	9	14	16	20	13	Ret	14	24	18	17	12	13	9	6	Ret	15	12	19	14	122	119
16	(Netherlands) Thomas Hylkema	11	14	Ret	Ret	21	10	7	11	16	11	13	23	10	Ret	Ret	16	Ret	6	13	19	121	
17	(United Kingdom) Euan Hankey															9	4	5	9	5	8	100	
18	(United Kingdom) Alice Powell (G)	15	13	16	Ret	10	Ret	21	10	15	20	18	Ret	16	Ret	Ret	Ret	12	13	11	16	88	88
19	(United Kingdom) Nick Yelloly (G)	Ret	20	18	Ret	22	Ret	19	21	17	16	20	15	7	10	Ret	9	Ret	10	10	Ret	83	83
20	(United Kingdom) Michael Lyons (G)	23	21	21	15	23	23	13	18	13	22	Ret	19	12	11	15	Ret	13	11	15	15	82	82
21	(United Kingdom) Tom Armour	16	15	15	14	16	Ret	10	Ret	14	15	21	16	11	15							74	
22	(United Kingdom) Ollie Hancock	10	19	19	Ret	13	4	17	Ret	Ret	12	15	22									64	
23	(United Kingdom) Lee Dwyer (G)	Ret	12	9	10	15	21	16	15	Ret	13	Ret	DNS									57	57
24	(Bahrain) Menasheh Idafar (G)	19	10	11	20	27	16	15	Ret	20	17	19	17	18	14							56	56
25	(Philippines) Marlon Stöckinger (G)	20	17	Ret	18	19	18	11	23	Ret	26	23	18	19	12	16	15	Ret	16	18	NC	56	56
26	(United Kingdom) Ryan Singleton (G)	21	Ret	Ret	Ret	28	DNS	14	19	18	NC	Ret	21	15	16	17	18	14	Ret	17	18	44	44
27	(United Kingdom) James Dixon			17	13	17	15	12	20													32	
28	(Poland) Mateusz Adamski																	11	15			16	
29	(United Kingdom) Jordan Williams (G)			20	Ret	18	14					22	Ret									11	11
30	(Ukraine) Maksym Dmytrenko	22	22	22	17	24	25	Ret	22	19	23	24	20									7	
31	(Croatia) Sasha Radola			23	19	25	24	20	Ret	21	24	25	Ret									3	
32	(Russia) Max Snegirev									22	25											0	
Pos	Driver	BHI		THR		DON		OUL		CRO		SILGP		SNE		SILN		ROC		BHGP		Pts	G. Pts

Colour	Result
Gold	Winner
Silver	Second place
Bronze	Third place
Green	Points classification
Blue	Non-points classification
Blue	Non-classified finish (NC)
Purple	Retired, not classified (Ret)
Red	Did not qualify (DNQ)
Red	Did not pre-qualify (DNPQ)
Black	Disqualified (DSQ)
White	Did not start (DNS)
White	Withdrew (WD)
White	Race cancelled (C)
Blank	Did not practice (DNP)
Blank	Did not arrive (DNA)
Blank	Excluded (EX)

**Bold** – Pole
Italics – Fastest lap

== Formula Renault UK Winter Series ==
The 2009 Formula Renault UK Winter Series was the 12th British Formula Renault Winter Series. The series began at Snetterton Motor Racing Circuit on 31 October and ended at Rockingham Motor Speedway on 7 November, after four races at two rounds held in England. Harry Tincknell won the title.

=== Teams and Drivers ===
Team	No.	Driver	Rounds
Manor Competition	1	(United Kingdom) David McDonald	All
Manor Competition	5	(United Kingdom) Menasheh Idafar	All
Manor Competition	9	(Netherlands) Thomas Hylkema	All
Manor Competition	55	(United Kingdom) Robert Foster-Jones	All
Fortec Motorsport	3	(Sweden) Tom Blomqvist	2
Fortec Motorsport	36	(United Kingdom) Alex Lynn	All
Fortec Motorsport	41	(United Kingdom) Luke Wright	All
Fortec Motorsport	8	(Italy) Dino Zamparelli	1
Antel Motorsport	18	(Italy) Dino Zamparelli	2
Hitech Junior Team	12	(United Kingdom) Nick Yelloly	All
Hitech Junior Team	33	(Philippines) Marlon Stockinger	All
Hillspeed	22	(United Kingdom) Joseph Reilly	All
CRS Racing	27	(United Kingdom) Harry Tincknell	All

=== Calendar ===
All races were held in United Kingdom.

Round		Circuit	Date	Pole position	Fastest lap	Winning driver	Winning team
1	R1	Snetterton	31 October	(United Kingdom) Harry Tincknell	(United Kingdom) Harry Tincknell	(United Kingdom) Harry Tincknell	CRS Racing
1	R2	Snetterton	31 October		(United Kingdom) Menasheh Idafar	(United Kingdom) Harry Tincknell	CRS Racing
2	R3	Rockingham	7 November	(United Kingdom) Harry Tincknell	(Sweden) Tom Blomqvist	(Sweden) Tom Blomqvist	Fortec Motorsport
2	R4	Rockingham	7 November		(Sweden) Tom Blomqvist	(Sweden) Tom Blomqvist	Fortec Motorsport

=== Driver Standings ===
Pos	Driver	SNE		ROC		Points
Pos	Driver	1	2	3	4	Points
1	(United Kingdom) Harry Tincknell	**1**	1	**3**	2	119
2	(United Kingdom) Nick Yelloly	2	6	4	3	93
3	(United Kingdom) Menasheh Idafar	4	2	6	6	88
4	(Netherlands) Thomas Hylkema	3	3	7	5	86
5	(Philippines) Marlon Stöckinger	5	10	2	4	81
6	(Italy) Dino Zamparelli	7	5	5	8	70
7	(Sweden) Tom Blomqvist			1	1	68
8	(United Kingdom) David McDonald	6	4	Ret	7	56
9	(United Kingdom) Joseph Reilly	12	11	9	11	41
10	(United Kingdom) Alex Lynn	8	8	Ret	9	40
11	(United Kingdom) Luke Wright	9	7	Ret	10	39
12	(United Kingdom) Robert Foster-Jones	10	9	8	Ret	37

Colour	Result
Gold	Winner
Silver	Second place
Bronze	Third place
Green	Points classification
Blue	Non-points classification
Blue	Non-classified finish (NC)
Purple	Retired, not classified (Ret)
Red	Did not qualify (DNQ)
Red	Did not pre-qualify (DNPQ)
Black	Disqualified (DSQ)
White	Did not start (DNS)
White	Withdrew (WD)
White	Race cancelled (C)
Blank	Did not practice (DNP)
Blank	Did not arrive (DNA)
Blank	Excluded (EX)

**Bold** – Pole
Italics – Fastest lap
