= Marlon Stöckinger =

Filipino racing driver (born 1991)

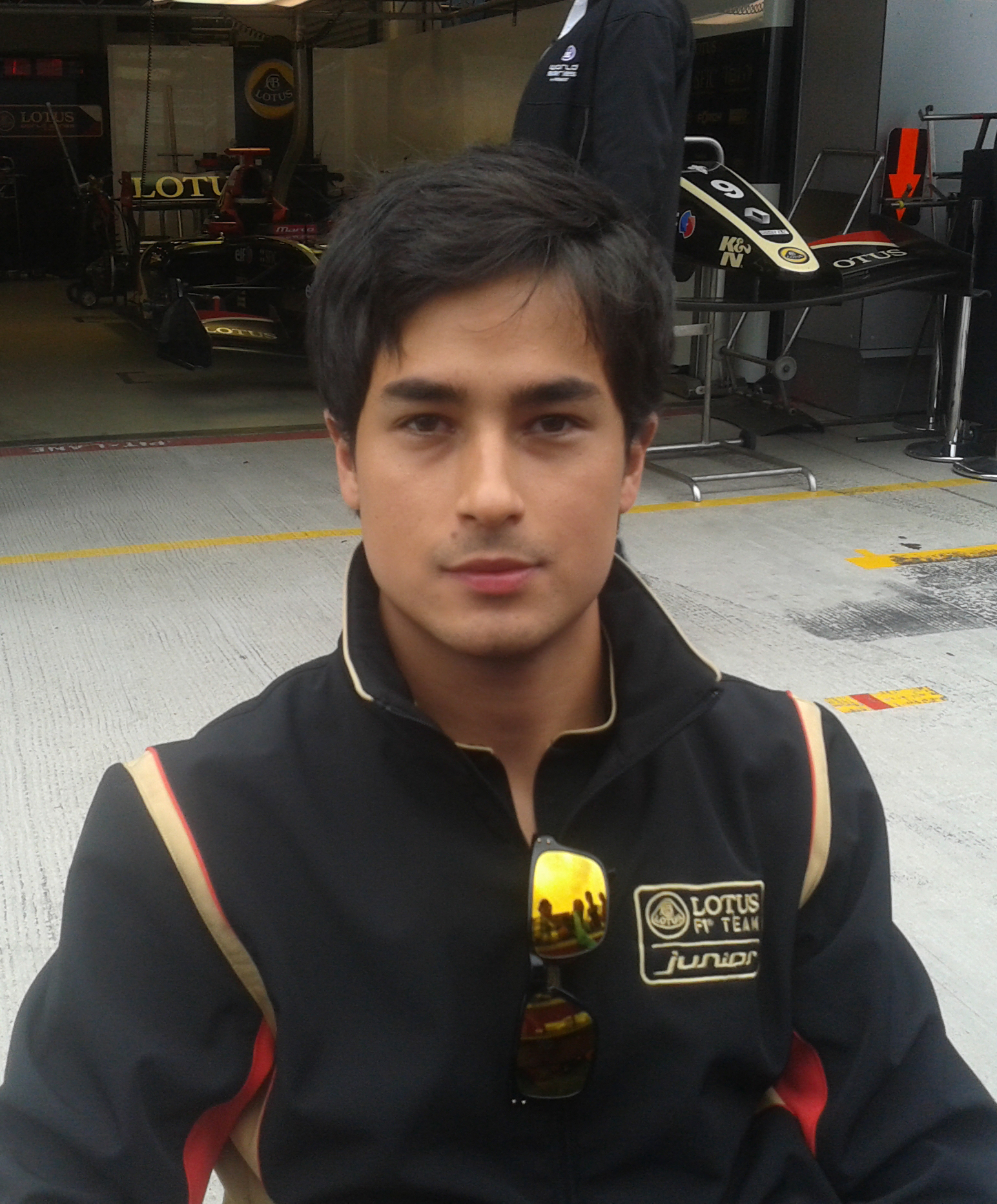
- Stöckinger in 2013
- Nationality: (Philippines) Filipino
- Born: Marlon Alexander Stöckinger; 4 April 1991 (age 35) Manila, Philippines
- Categorisation: FIA Silver

Previous series
- 2016 2016 2015 2013–2015 2011–2012 2010 2009–2010 2009 2008 2008: Blancpain GT Series Sprint Cup; Blancpain GT Series Endurance Cup; GP2 Series; Formula Renault 3.5 Series; GP3 Series; Eurocup Formula Renault 2.0; Formula Renault 2.0 UK; Formula Renault UK Winter Series; Formula BMW Europe; Fórmula Júnior FR2.0 Portugal
- Statistics up to date as of 13 September 2024.

Marlon Alexander Stöckinger (born 4 April 1991) is a Filipino-Swiss racing driver competing under the Philippine flag. He most recently competed in the 2016 GT Series Sprint Cup for ISR Racing. He raced for Status Grand Prix in the 2015 GP2 Series and 2012 GP3 Series, and for Lotus in the Formula Renault 3.5 Series from 2013 to 2015. He is the first Filipino to win a formula race in Europe, winning race 9 of the 2010 Formula Renault 2.0 UK Championship at the Croft Circuit on 19 June of that year.

Stöckinger was the 2006 Asian Karting Champion, 2007 Philippine Rotax Max Champion and the 2008 Formula BMW Pacific Scholarship Winner.

== Early life ==
Stöckinger was born in Manila, Philippines. He is the son of a Swiss businessman and racing enthusiast Tom Stöckinger and Filipina Egin San Pedro; He grew up in the Philippines and moved to Europe at age 17 to pursue a career in auto racing.

== Racing career ==
=== Early career ===
Prior to joining the Formula Renault series, Stöckinger won titles and honors from international derbies such as the Formula BMW Pacific 2008 Championships, the Senior Rotax Max World Finals 2007, the Asian Karting Championship 2006, the Junior Rotax Max-World Finals 2005 and the Philippine Shell Super Karting Series 2002. He participated at the 2008 Formula BMW Europe season – the championship's maiden season after the merger of the British and German series — as a guest driver, racing at the Hungaroring (21st and 23rd place), Valencia Street Circuit (15th and 23rd place) and at the Circuit de Spa-Francorchamps (20th and 21st).

=== Formula Renault 2.0 UK (2009–2010) ===
Stöckinger made his debut at the UK championship in 2009 at 18 years of age, joining other newcomers including Harry Tincknell, Matias Laine and Will Stevens. He arrived 20th on his debut at Brands Hatch and eventually finished 25th in the championship with 56 points. His best result was an eleventh place at round eight at Oulton Park.

The following season began at Thruxton on 3 April 2010 and would end on 10 October at Brands Hatch, after twenty rounds held in England, and for the first time since 2006, Scotland. After arriving tenth in his first race of the year, Stöckinger was able to finish third at Rockingham Motor Speedway, his best result ever in two seasons. At the Croft Circuit (round 8), he started from pole and finished the race first, becoming the first Filipino to have won a formula race in Europe. The performance was then followed by a second place in the same circuit, behind Lewis Williamson.

=== FIA GP3 Series (2011–2012) ===
The following year, Stöckinger moved to the GP3 series, where he suited up for Atech CRS Grand Prix in the 2011 GP3 Series season.

Going into his second year in the GP3 Series, Stöckinger was assessed by Status Grand Prix during their autumn tests. He was regularly featured in the top-five of the time sheets at Barcelona, Valencia and Jerez tests, and impressed the team with his performances. In February 2012, Stöckinger left Atech GP and signed to join Status Grand Prix for the 2012 GP3 Series season. Stöckinger collected his first win in the 2012 GP3 Series at Monaco and set his first pole position and the fastest lap of the race.

=== Formula Renault 3.5 Series (2013-2015) ===
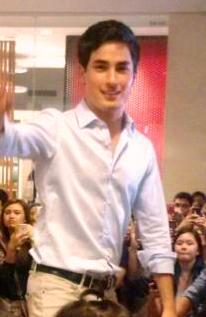
Stockinger at the Globe Tattoo launch in Glorietta 4, Makati, May 2013.

Stöckinger became a member of the Lotus F1 Team in February 2013, serving as one of seven junior team drivers. Stöckinger and the other six young drivers would be supported by Lotus in all areas such as driving skills, physical fitness, health and nutrition, social and mental development, business ethics and principals, as well as PR training as a preparation for their future careers.

It was confirmed that Stöckinger would stay and drive for Lotus F1 on 2014 Formula Renault 3.5 season alongside newly recruited Matthieu Vaxivière of France and former French F4 Champion.

=== FIA GP2 Series (2015) ===
On 5 March 2015, it was confirmed Stöckinger would reunite with Status as one of their drivers in the 2015 GP2 season. He would go on to score no points and finished 26th in the series standings with a best finish of 11th.

== Other ventures ==
Stöckinger was a presenter for Top Gear Philippines along with Richard Gomez (Seasons 1–3), Gary Valenciano (Season 1), Apl.de.ap (Season 2 onwards) and Jolina Magdangal (Season 4 onwards).

== Personal life ==
Stöckinger is a practising Catholic. He was in a relationship with Miss Universe 2015 Pia Wurtzbach from 2017 to 2019. A former girlfriend, model Kit Barraquias, claimed that Stöckinger is the father of her twin daughters.

== Racing record ==
=== Career summary ===
Season	Series	Team	Races	Wins	Poles	F/Laps	Podiums	Points	Position
2008	Portuguese Formula Renault 2.0 Winter Series	CR Scuderia	2	0	0	0	0	2	27th
2008	Formula BMW Europe	EuroInternational	6	0	0	0	0	0	NC†
2008	Formula BMW Pacific	Eurasia Motorsport	16	0	0	0	1	72	8th
2009	Formula Renault 2.0 UK Championship	Hitech Junior Team	20	0	0	0	0	56	25th
2009	Formula Renault 2.0 UK Winter Series	Hitech Junior Team	4	0	0	0	1	81	5th
2010	Formula Renault 2.0 UK Championship	Atech Grand Prix	20	1	1	0	3	273	8th
2010	Eurocup Formula Renault 2.0	Atech Grand Prix	2	0	0	0	0	0	NC†
2011	GP3 Series	Atech CRS GP	16	0	0	0	0	0	29th
2012	GP3 Series	Status Grand Prix	16	1	0	2	2	55	10th
2013	Formula Renault 3.5 Series	Lotus	16	0	0	0	0	23	18th
2014	Formula Renault 3.5 Series	Lotus	17	0	0	0	2	73	9th
2015	Formula Renault 3.5 Series	Lotus	8	0	0	0	0	14	17th
2015	GP2 Series	Status Grand Prix	21	0	0	2	0	0	26th
2016	Blancpain GT Series Endurance Cup	ISR	5	0	0	0	0	7	37th
2016	Blancpain GT Series Sprint Cup	ISR	10	0	2	2	1	21	12th

† Guest driver ineligible to score points

=== Complete Eurocup Formula Renault 2.0 results ===
(key) (Races in bold indicate pole position; races in italics indicate fastest lap)

Year	Entrant	1	2	3	4	5	6	7	8	9	10	11	12	13	14	15	16	DC	Points
2010	Atech Grand Prix	ALC; 1	ALC; 2	SPA; 1	SPA; 2	BRN; 1	BRN; 2	MAG; 1	MAG; 2	HUN; 1; 5	HUN; 2; 8	HOC; 1	HOC; 2	SIL; 1	SIL; 2	CAT; 1	CAT; 2	NC†	0

† As Stöckinger was a guest driver, he was ineligible for points

=== Complete GP3 Series results ===
(key) (Races in bold indicate pole position) (Races in italics indicate fastest lap)

Year	Entrant	1	2	3	4	5	6	7	8	9	10	11	12	13	14	15	16	DC	Points
2011	ATECH CRS GP	IST; FEA; Ret	IST; SPR; 23	CAT; FEA; 26	CAT; SPR; Ret	VAL; FEA; 14	VAL; SPR; 16	SIL; FEA; 16	SIL; SPR; Ret	NÜR; FEA; Ret	NÜR; SPR; DNS	HUN; FEA; 12	HUN; SPR; 17	SPA; FEA; Ret	SPA; SPR; 10	MNZ; FEA; 19	MNZ; SPR; 13	29th	0
2012	Status Grand Prix	CAT; FEA; 2	CAT; SPR; 19	MON; FEA; 8	MON; SPR; 1	VAL; FEA; 19	VAL; SPR; 11	SIL; FEA; 16	SIL; SPR; Ret	HOC; FEA; 16	HOC; SPR; 11	HUN; FEA; 9	HUN; SPR; 13	SPA; FEA; 14	SPA; SPR; 16	MNZ; FEA; 7	MNZ; SPR; 4	10th	55

=== Complete Formula Renault 3.5 Series results ===
(key) (Races in bold indicate pole position) (Races in italics indicate fastest lap)

Year	Team	1	2	3	4	5	6	7	8	9	10	11	12	13	14	15	16	17	Pos	Points
2013	Lotus	MNZ; 1; 14	MNZ; 2; 12	ALC; 1; 19	ALC; 2 DNS	MON; 1 Ret	SPA; 1; 20	SPA; 2; 17	MSC; 1; 8	MSC; 2; 12	RBR; 1; 8	RBR; 2; 7	HUN; 1; 13	HUN; 2; 7	LEC; 1; 15	LEC; 2; 10	CAT; 1 Ret	CAT; 2; 9	18th	23
2014	Lotus	MNZ; 1; 14	MNZ; 2; 2	ALC; 1; 4	ALC; 2 Ret	MON; 1; 11	SPA; 1; 9	SPA; 2; 11	MSC; 1; 7	MSC; 2; 11	NÜR; 1; 5	NÜR; 2; 3	HUN; 1; 15	HUN; 2; 14	LEC; 1; 6	LEC; 2; 13	JER; 1 Ret	JER; 2; 9	9th	73
2015	Lotus	ALC; 1	ALC; 2	MON; 1	SPA; 1	SPA; 2	HUN; 1	HUN; 2	RBR; 1 Ret	RBR; 2; 6	SIL; 1	SIL; 2	NÜR; 1; 11	NÜR; 2; 7	BUG; 1; 15	BUG; 2; 11	JER; 1; 17	JER; 2; 14	17th	14

=== Complete GP2 Series results ===
(key) (Races in bold indicate pole position) (Races in italics indicate fastest lap)

Year	Entrant	1	2	3	4	5	6	7	8	9	10	11	12	13	14	15	16	17	18	19	20	21	22	DC	Points
2015	Status Grand Prix	BHR; FEA; 11	BHR; SPR; 19	CAT; FEA; Ret	CAT; SPR; 20	MON; FEA; 19	MON; SPR; 18	RBR; FEA; 19	RBR; SPR; 19	SIL; FEA; 19	SIL; SPR; 22	HUN; FEA; 19	HUN; SPR; 23	SPA; FEA; 17	SPA; SPR; 19	MNZ; FEA; Ret	MNZ; SPR; 19	SOC; FEA; Ret	SOC; SPR; Ret	BHR; FEA; 13	BHR; SPR; 19	YMC; FEA; 18	YMC; SPR; C	26th	0

=== Complete Blancpain GT Series Sprint Cup results ===
Year	Team	Car	Class	1	2	3	4	5	6	7	8	9	10	Pos.	Points
2016	ISR	Audi R8 LMS	Pro	MIS; QR; 31	MIS; CR; 35	**BRH**; **QR**; 2	BRH; CR; 5	NÜR; QR; 4	NÜR; CR; 25	HUN; QR; 27	HUN; CR; 24	**CAT**; **QR**; 26	CAT; CR; 17	12th	21
