= James Calado =

British racing driver (born 1989)

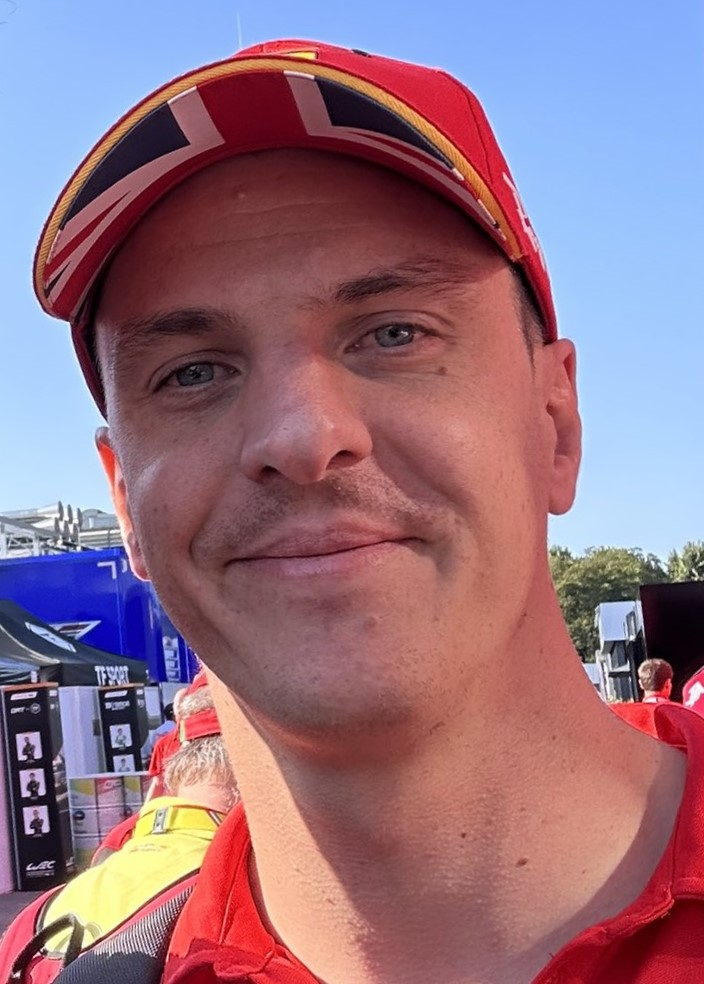
- Calado in 2023
- Nationality: (United Kingdom) British
- Born: James John Calado; 13 June 1989 (age 37) Cropthorne, Worcestershire, England

WEC career
- Debut season: 2014
- Current team: Ferrari AF Corse
- Categorisation: FIA Platinum
- Car number: 51
- Starts: 92
- Wins: 15
- Poles: 9
- Fastest laps: 3
- Best finish: 1st in 2017, 2021, 2022, 2025

Previous series
- 2012–2013 2011 2010 2009 2008–09 2008 2008 2008: GP2 Series; GP3 Series; British Formula 3 Eurocup Formula Renault 2.0; Formula Renault 2.0 UK; FR2.0 Portugal Winter Series; FR2.0 UK Winter Series; Formula Renault 2.0 NEC

Championship titles
- 2025 2022 2021 2017 2008 2008: FIA World Endurance Championship; GT World Endurance Championship FR2.0 Portugal Winter Series; FR2.0 UK Winter Series

James John Calado (born 13 June 1989) is a British professional racing driver from England who is competing in the FIA World Endurance Championship with Ferrari - AF Corse in the Hypercar class and other selected GT races for AF Corse. He won the 2025 FIA World Endurance Championship in the Hypercar class and the LMGTE Pro class of the 2017 FIA World Endurance Championship and 2019 24 Hours of Le Mans, and overall victory in the 2023 24 Hours of Le Mans. He drove for Panasonic Jaguar Racing in Formula E. His career has been funded by the Racing Steps Foundation.

== Early career ==
=== Karting ===
Born and raised in Cropthorne, Worcestershire, Calado had an extensive karting career, starting out at Cadets level in 1999. After being a member of the 2000 championship-winning England Inter-Nations Cadet Team, Calado won the British Cadet Championship in 2001, and also finished runner-up to Daniel Rowbottom in the Super 1 Cadet series, losing out by thirteen points. In 2002, Calado stepped up to TKM Juniors, finishing fifth in the Super 1 championship. 2003 saw Calado contest pan-European series for the first time, driving a Gillard Parilla kart for the PDB Racing Team in the ICA Junior class. He finished runner-up to Nicholas Risitano in the European Championship, beating future Formula One drivers Sébastien Buemi and Jaime Alguersuari.

Calado moved to Tony Kart for the 2004 season, and once again finished in the top three of the European Championship; this time finishing third behind Stefano Coletti and Jules Bianchi. He also finished fifth in the Andrea Margutti Trophy, and ninth in the Italian Open Masters. He moved up to the ICA class in 2005, and won the European Championship ahead of his future team-mate Jean-Éric Vergne, and also finished runner-up to Armando Parente in the Italian Open Masters. He returned to the UK to contest the Renault Elite League in the Super Libre class, finishing seventh in the championship.

Calado moved into the top class of international karting in 2006, moving into the Formula A class. Sixth in the Italian Open Masters, Calado went to Macau for the International Kart Grand Prix, where he finished as runner-up to Michael Christensen. His final season of karting, in 2007, saw his fourth top-five placing in the European Championship, as well as a third-place finish in the Margutti Trophy. He also placed ninth in the South Garda Winter Cup.

=== Formula Renault ===
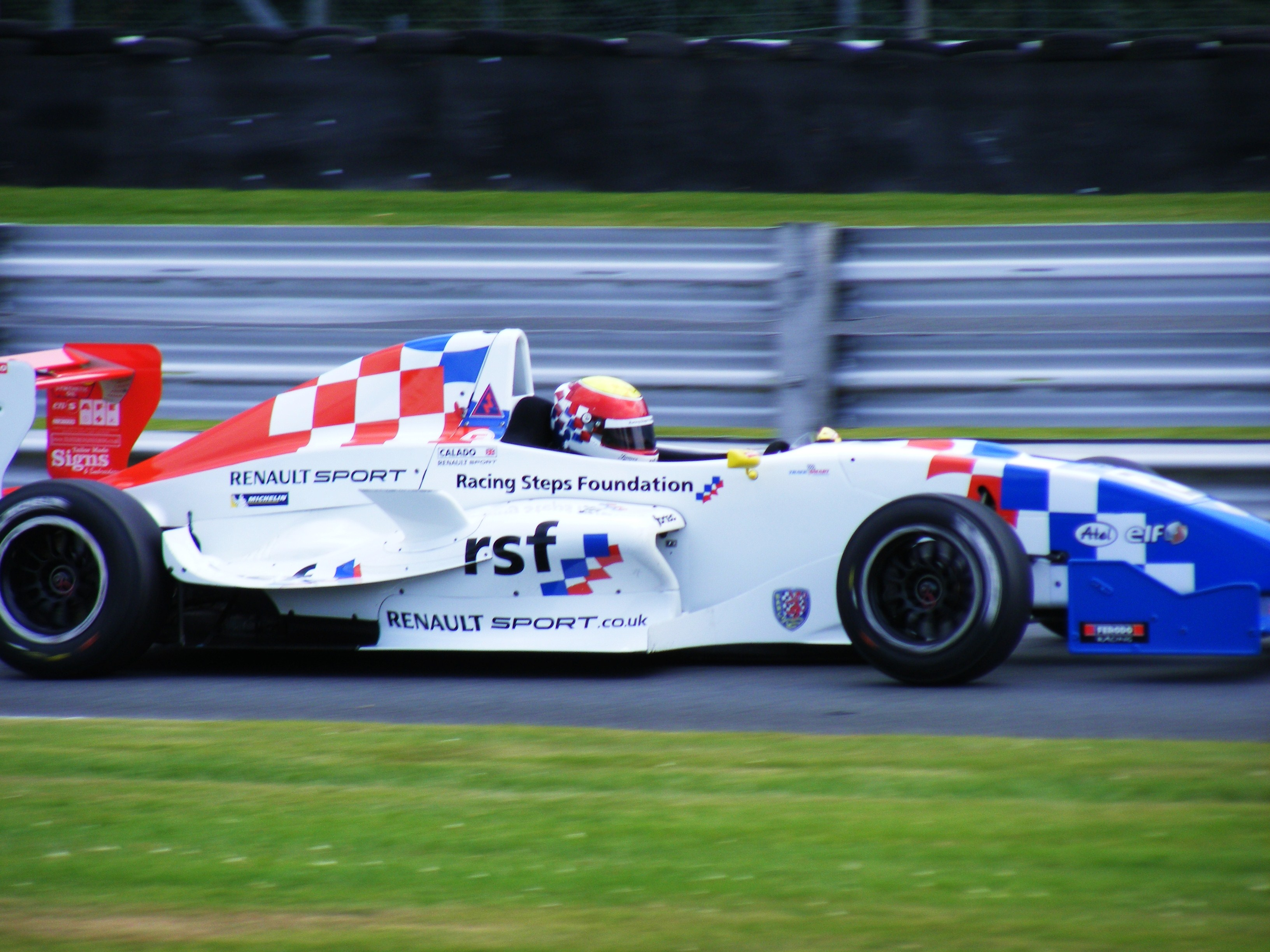
Calado competing during the 2008 Formula Renault UK season at Oulton Park

Calado moved into the British Formula Renault Championship for the 2008 season, driving for Fortec Motorsport. With no prior single-seater experience, Calado was placed into the Graduate Cup for first-year drivers. Calado finished runner-up to Dean Stoneman in that championship, and he finished seventh in the overall championship. He took two pole positions at Snetterton and Oulton Park, with one victory coming at Snetterton from that pole. He also earned three other podium placings throughout the season. Calado also contested two rounds of the Formula Renault 2.0 Northern European Cup at Zolder and Spa-Francorchamps. He earned two top-five finishes en route to finishing 25th in the overall championship standings, amassing 38 points. At the conclusion of the season, Calado enter the Winter Series of both the British and Portuguese Formula Renault championships. Over the two championships' eight total races, Calado took five pole positions, six fastest laps and five victories en route to both championships; holding Henry Surtees off by just three points in the British Winter Series.

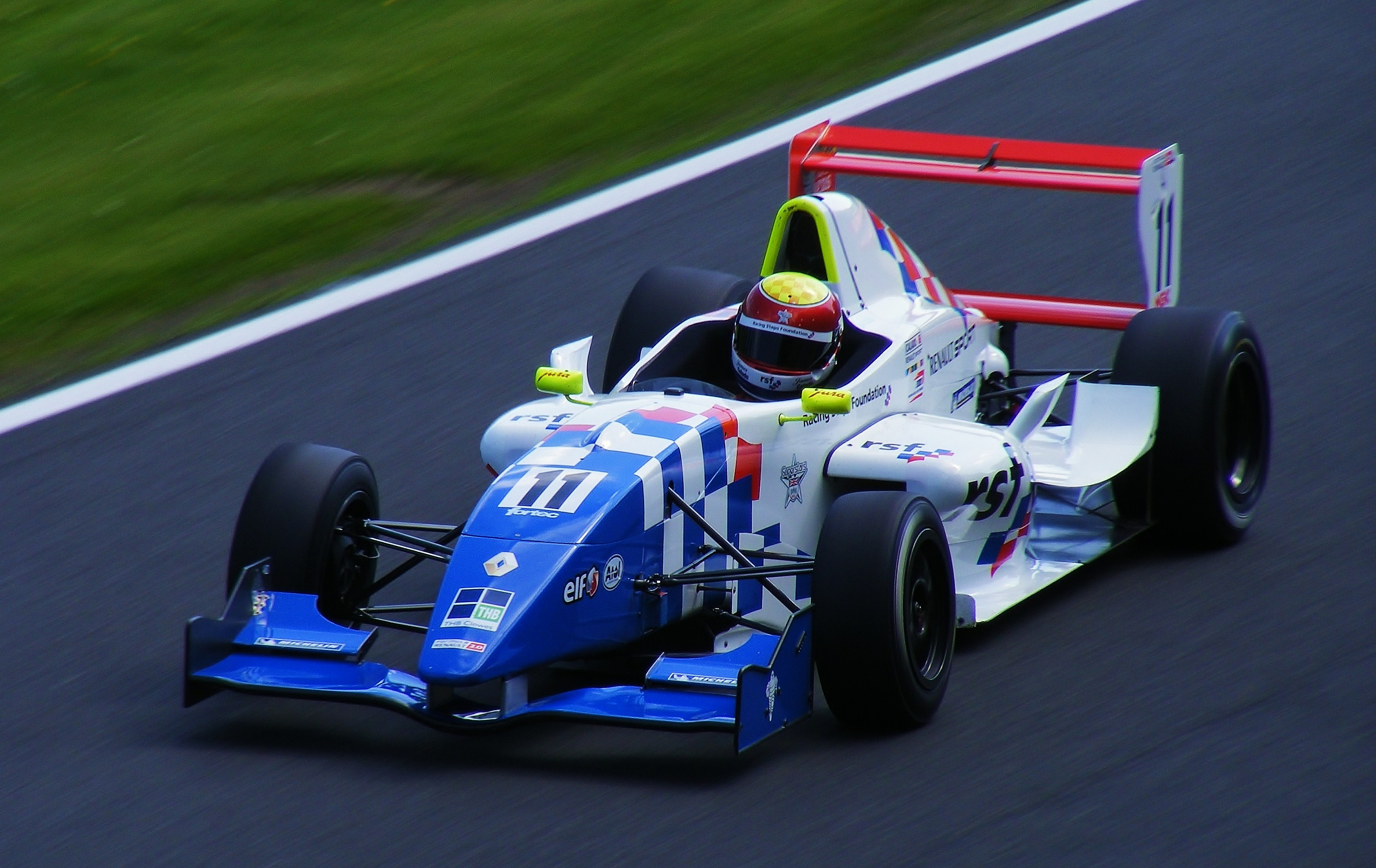
Calado competing during the 2009 Formula Renault UK season at Oulton Park

Calado continued in the British series for the 2009 season, staying with Fortec for his sophomore campaign. Calado and Alpine Motorsport's Stoneman, both in their second season and boasting victories in their début season in the series, with pre-season testing further backing media predictions that the championship would most likely be decided between the pair. Calado was the most successful driver in the series, taking a total of eight victories, winning races at seven of the championship's ten meetings during the season. He also earned ten pole positions, and set the fastest lap of the race on seven occasions. However, retirements at Thruxton, Oulton Park and Croft took the title out of the hands of Calado and into the hands of Dean Smith, who joined the series at the second round of the championship. Calado ultimately finished as runner-up behind Smith, 34 points behind the Wolverhampton driver. Calado also contested three rounds of the Eurocup Formula Renault 2.0 for Fortec, competing in Barcelona, Spa and Le Mans. He finished seventeenth in the championship, amassing ten points from a fifth in Barcelona and seventh at Spa. He lost a podium finish at Barcelona due to a puncture with two laps remaining, which could have ultimately turned into a win after the post-race disqualification of winner Albert Costa.

=== Formula Three (2010) ===
Calado moved into the British Formula 3 Championship for the 2010 season, as part of a six-car title challenge by Carlin. He was the second RSF-funded driver to drive for the team, after Oliver Turvey finished runner-up in the 2008 championship. He took five victories to finish second in the championship, behind runaway leader Jean-Éric Vergne.

=== GP3 Series (2011) ===
Calado moved up to the GP3 Series for 2011, driving for the Lotus ART team alongside Pedro Nunes, Richie Stanaway and Valtteri Bottas. In a successful season for ART, Bottas won the championship whilst Calado backed him up with second in the drivers' standings, taking a single win at Valencia and five further podium finishes. ART also won the teams' championship.

=== GP2 Series (2011–2013) ===
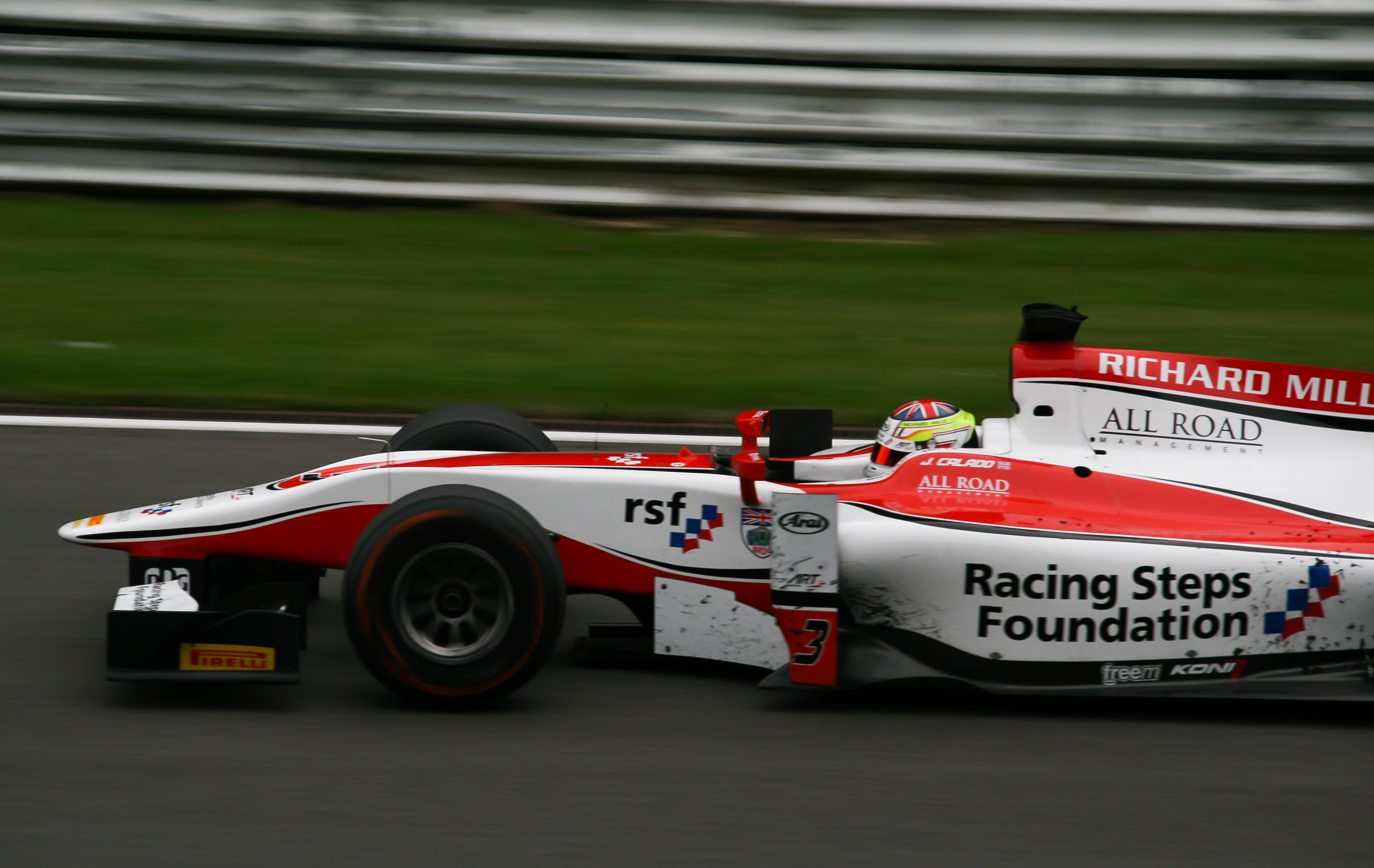
Calado winning the Belgium 2013 GP2 Grand Prix

Calado made his GP2 Series début by driving for ART in the non-championship race at Yas Marina which concluded the 2011 season. He had a victorious race in the sprint race, the second race of the weekend. He joined the Lotus-branded team full-time for the 2012 season, alongside second-year driver Esteban Gutiérrez. He continued his form from the non-championship race by winning the sprint race of the first round of the season in Malaysia. After taking pole positions for the Spanish rounds at Catalunya and Valencia, but not being able to convert them into victories, he won his second race of the season at Hockenheim. At this stage of the championship, he was third in the drivers' standings, but a poor run in the final four races—after crashing in practice at Monza and suffering from food poisoning in Singapore saw him overhauled by team-mate Gutiérrez and compatriot Max Chilton. Nevertheless, his fifth place in the championship meant that he finished the season as the series' most successful rookie driver, ahead of Felipe Nasr in tenth position. Autosport magazine rated Calado as the GP2 season's best driver, due to his inexperience compared to the drivers who finished ahead of him in the championship.

Lotus GP became ART once again for the 2013 season and Calado was joined by rookie Daniel Abt. A consistent season saw him claim two sprint race wins and another five podiums meant he finished third in the standings on 157 points but quite a distance behind the top two Fabio Leimer and Sam Bird.

=== Formula One ===
==== Force India (2013) ====
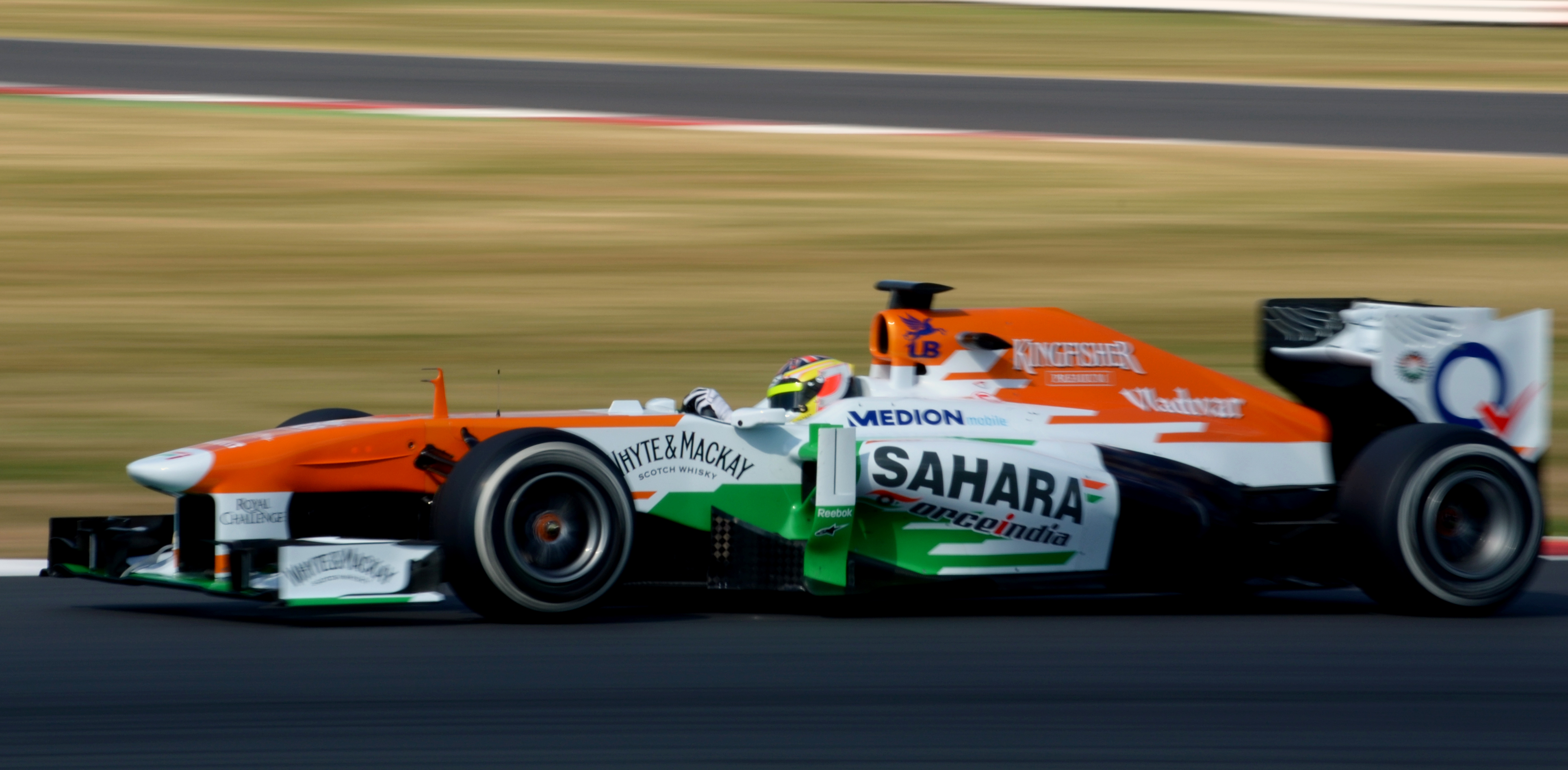
Calado driving a Force India Formula One car in 2013

Partway through the 2013 season, Formula One team Force India selected him for the Young Driver's test in July, held at Silverstone. He had a successful test, setting the fourth fastest time on the first day. As a result of this, and his good GP2 form, Force India announced that they had selected Calado as their third driver for the Italian Grand Prix on 2 September 2013, and that he would run in the first practice session.

== Formula E ==
In June 2019, Calado partook in testing sessions with Panasonic Jaguar Racing.

On 2 October 2019, it was announced that Calado would partner Mitch Evans in the Panasonic Jaguar team, replacing Alex Lynn.

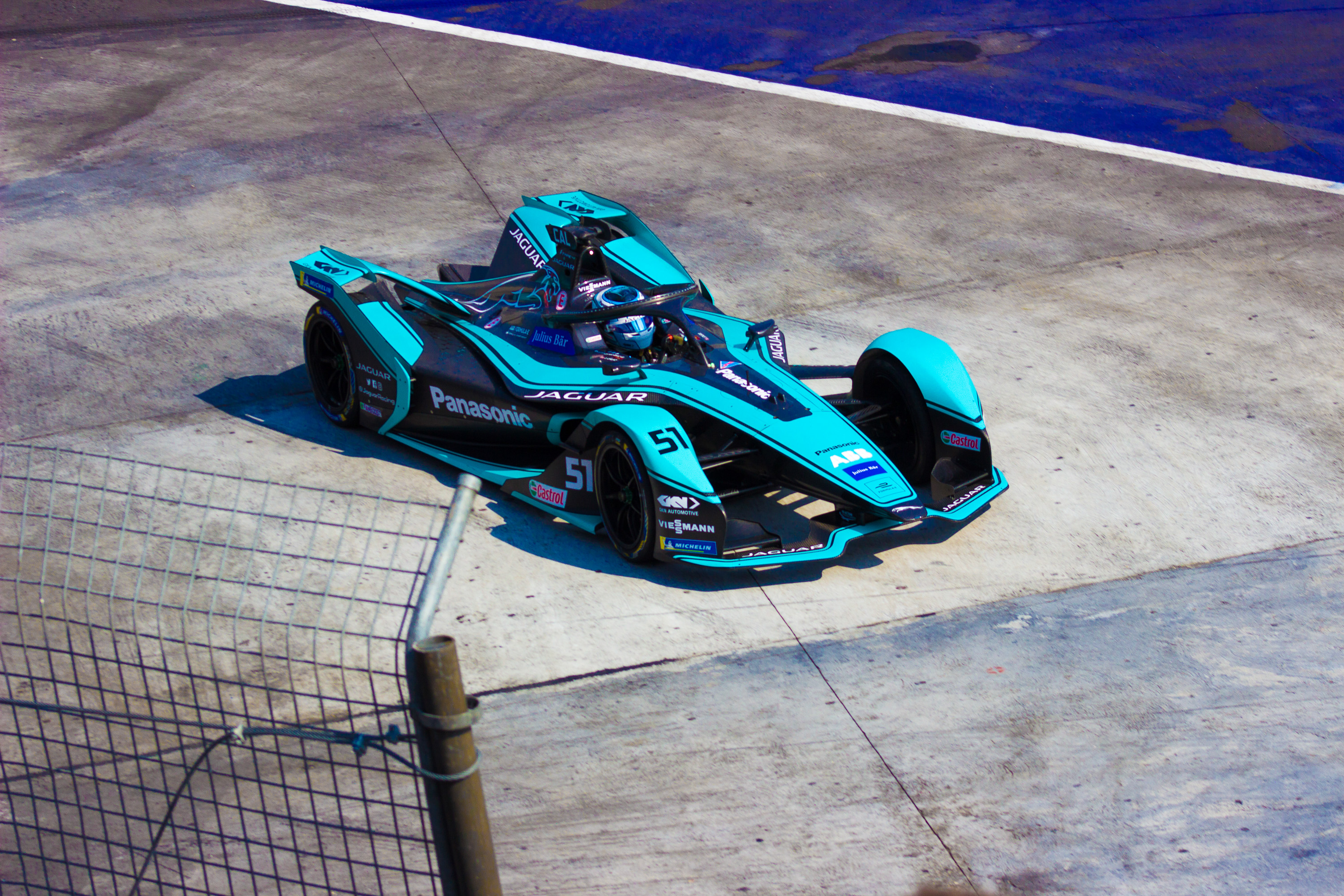
Calado driving at the 2020 Mexico City ePrix.

Calado made his debut with the team at the 2019 Diriyah ePrix, crashing during qualifying for the first race & finishing 16th. He struggled during qualifying the following day but showed excellent race pace & in a race of attrition stayed out of the carnage to record his first points in seventh. He continued his points-scoring form at the next race in Santiago, where he finished in eighth. He would have finished in ninth at the 2020 Mexico City ePrix, but was later disqualified for a technical issue. He lacked pace in Marrakesh despite qualifying well & dropped to 16th position.

== Sportscar career ==
=== AF Corse ===
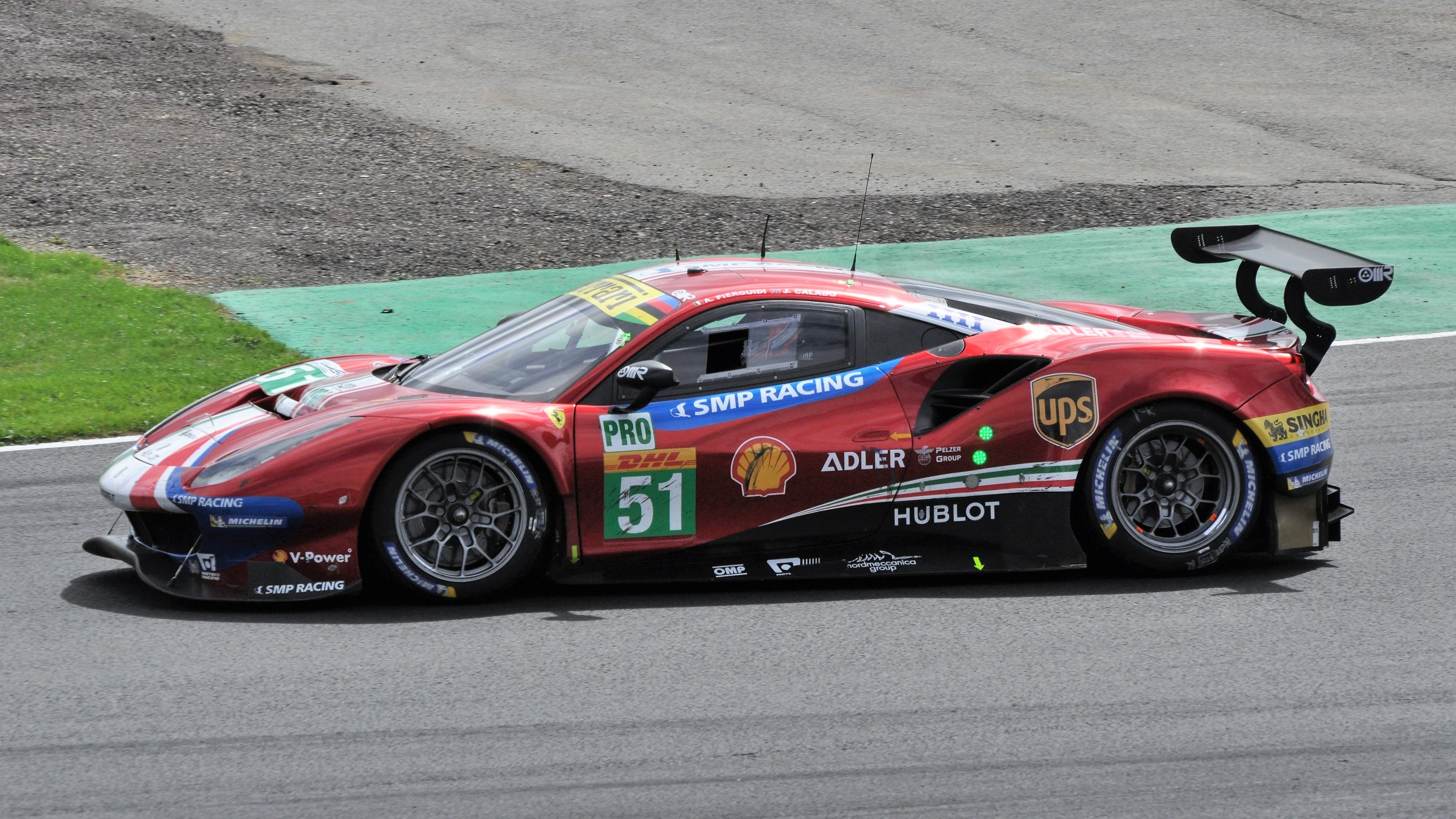
Calado racing in the 2018 6 Hours of Silverstone.

For 2014, Calado joined Italian Davide Rigon at AF Corse, making his debut at the 6 Hours of Silverstone where the pair finished in fifth position behind their teammates, Finn Toni Vilander and Italian Gianmaria Bruni. Calado and Rigon celebrated a podium in the second race of the season at the 6 Hours of Spa-Francorchamps. For Calado, it was his first podium in sports cars. For 2016, he joined Bruni.

In 2017, Calado was joined by Alessandro Pier Guidi and won the world championship. In 2019, he won the 24 Hours of Le Mans together with Pier Guidi and Daniel Serra behind the wheel of the No. 51 AF Corse Ferrari 488 GTE Evo. In 2021, he won the 24 Hours of Le Mans for the second time, together with Pier Guidi and Ledogar.

=== IMSA Weathertech Sportscar Championship ===
Calado made his debut in 2016 24 Hours of Daytona with the Ferrari 488 GTE of SMP Racing and take part in some selected races in following years, all with Risi Competizione. He won the 2016 and 2019 Petit Le Mans with the 488 GTE and scored podiums at 24 Hours of Daytona and 12 Hours of Sebring.

== Hypercar ==
Going into the 2023 season, Calado would join the Ferrari Hypercar project run by AF Corse, competing in the WEC with a Ferrari 499P alongside Alessandro Pier Guidi and Antonio Giovinazzi. With a third place at Spa, where Calado overtook Frédéric Makowiecki on the final lap, and a victory at the 24 Hours of Le Mans — Ferrari's first in 50 years — the No. 51 crew finished fourth in the standings, being beaten to third by the sister car.

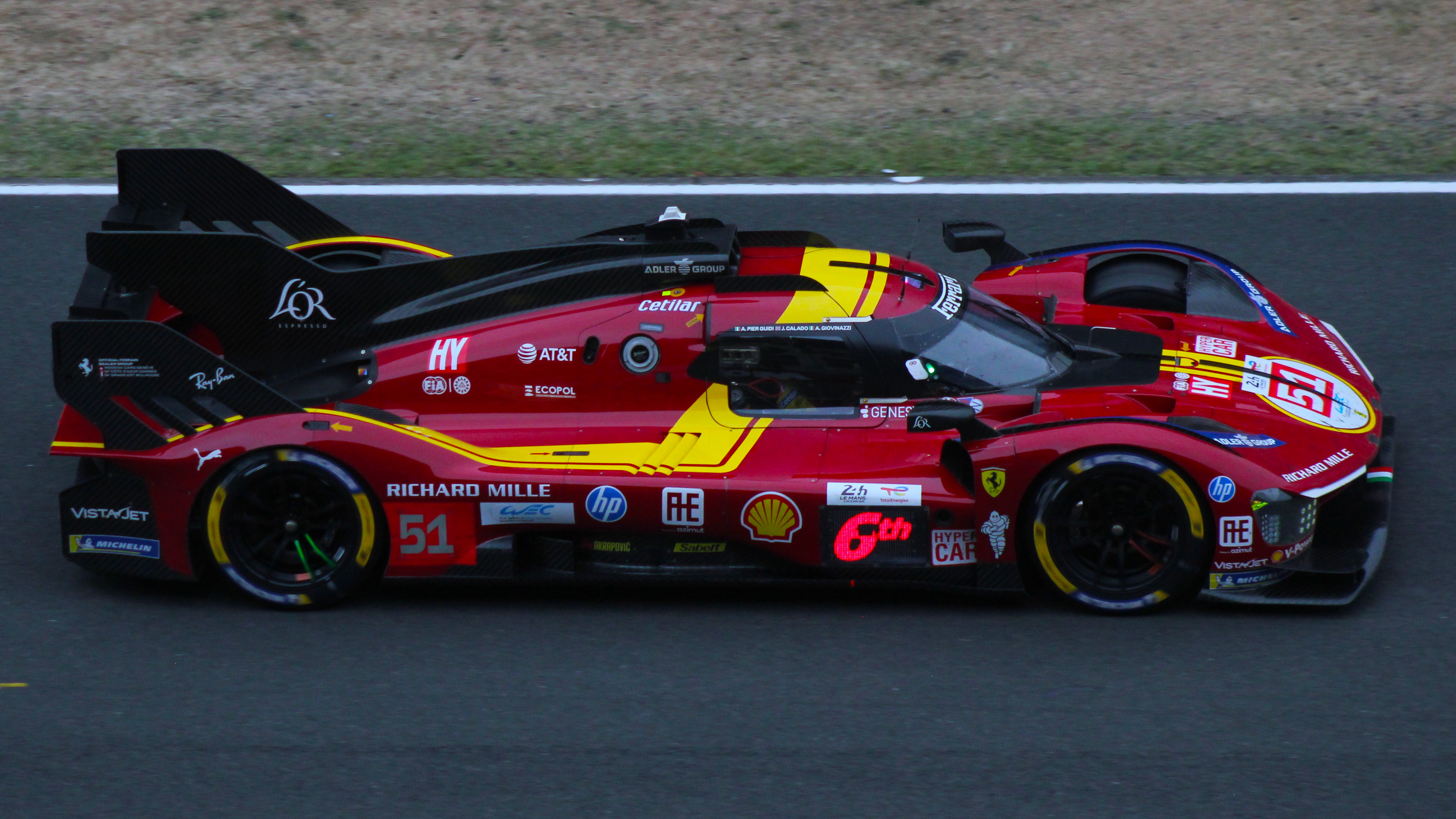
Calado's No. 51 car at the 2025 24 Hours of Le Mans

Alongside Pier Guidi and Giovinazzi, Calado won the 2025 FIA World Endurance Championship Drivers and Manufacturers Championship with Ferrari.

== Racing record ==
=== Career summary ===
Season	Series	Team	Races	Wins	Poles	F/Laps	Podiums	Points	Position
2008	Formula Renault UK	Fortec Motorsport	20	1	2	0	4	292	7th
2008	Formula Renault 2.0 NEC	Fortec Motorsport	3	0	0	0	0	38	25th
2008	Formula Renault UK Winter Cup	Fortec Motorsport	4	2	3	4	3	116	**1st**
2008	Portuguese Formula Renault 2.0 Winter Series	Fortec Motorsport	4	3	2	2	4	60	**1st**
2009	Formula Renault UK	Fortec Motorsport	20	8	10	7	12	457	**2nd**
2009	Eurocup Formula Renault 2.0	Fortec Motorsport	6	0	0	1	0	10	17th
2010	British Formula 3 Championship	Carlin	30	5	2	4	12	293	**2nd**
2011	GP3 Series	Lotus ART	16	1	1	2	6	55	**2nd**
2011	GP2 Final	Lotus ART	2	1	0	0	1	7	5th
2012	GP2 Series	Lotus GP	24	2	2	1	7	160	5th
2013	GP2 Series	ART Grand Prix	22	2	0	2	7	157	**3rd**
2013	Formula One	Sahara Force India F1 Team	Test driver						
2014	FIA World Endurance Championship - LMGTE Pro	AF Corse	8	0	0	0	5	94	7th
2015	FIA World Endurance Championship - LMGTE Pro	AF Corse	8	0	1	0	5	123	4th
2015	24 Hours of Le Mans - LMGTE Pro	AF Corse	1	0	0	0	1	N/A	**2nd**
2015	GT Asia Series	Clearwater Racing	3	0	0	0	1	36	25th
2015	European Le Mans Series - LMGTE	JMW Motorsport	1	0	0	0	0	0	18th
2016	FIA World Endurance Championship - LMGTE Pro	AF Corse	9	1	1	1	7	128	**3rd**
2016	24 Hours of Le Mans - LMGTE Pro	AF Corse	1	0	1	0	0	N/A	DNF
2016	IMSA SportsCar Championship - GTLM	SMP Racing	1	0	0	0	0	58	19th
2016	IMSA SportsCar Championship - GTLM	Risi Competizione	1	1	0	0	1	58	19th
2017	FIA World Endurance Championship - LMGTE Pro	AF Corse	9	3	0	0	7	153	**1st**
2017	24 Hours of Le Mans - LMGTE Pro	AF Corse	1	0	0	0	0	N/A	11th
2017	Blancpain GT Series Endurance Cup	Kaspersky Motorsport	5	0	1	0	0	32	7th
2017	Intercontinental GT Challenge	Kaspersky Motorsport	1	0	0	0	0	0	NC
2017	IMSA SportsCar Championship - GTLM	Risi Competizione	2	0	0	0	2	60	18th
2018	IMSA SportsCar Championship - GTLM	Risi Competizione	2	0	0	0	0	52	17th
2018	24 Hours of Le Mans - LMGTE Pro	AF Corse	1	0	0	0	0	N/A	7th
2018–19	FIA World Endurance Championship - LMGTE Pro	AF Corse	8	2	0	0	3	136.5	**2nd**
2018–19	Asian Le Mans Series - GT	CarGuy Racing	4	4	1	0	4	101	**1st**
2019	IMSA SportsCar Championship - GTLM	Risi Competizione	2	1	1	0	2	67	20th
2019	Blancpain GT Series Endurance Cup	AF Corse	1	0	0	0	0	0	NC
2019	24 Hours of Le Mans - LMGTE Pro	AF Corse	1	1	0	0	1	N/A	**1st**
2019	Intercontinental GT Challenge	AF Corse	1	0	0	0	0	0	NC
2019	Intercontinental GT Challenge	CarGuy Racing	1	0	0	0	0	0	NC
2019–20	Formula E	Panasonic Jaguar Racing	9	0	0	0	0	10	19th
2019–20	FIA World Endurance Championship - LMGTE Pro	AF Corse	8	1	1	1	3	132	5th
2020	GT World Challenge Europe Endurance Cup	AF Corse	3	0	0	0	0	46	6th
2020	24 Hours of Le Mans - LMGTE Pro	AF Corse	1	0	0	0	1	N/A	**2nd**
2020	Intercontinental GT Challenge	AF Corse	1	0	0	0	0	12	15th
2020	IMSA SportsCar Championship - GTLM	Risi Competizione	1	0	0	0	0	25	16th
2021	FIA World Endurance Championship - LMGTE Pro	AF Corse	6	3	0	0	6	177	**1st**
2021	24 Hours of Le Mans - LMGTE Pro	AF Corse	1	1	0	0	1	N/A	**1st**
2021	IMSA SportsCar Championship - GTLM	Risi Competizione	1	0	0	0	0	308	13th
2022	FIA World Endurance Championship - LMGTE Pro	AF Corse	6	2	1	1	4	135	**1st**
2022	24 Hours of Le Mans - LMGTE Pro	AF Corse	1	0	0	0	1	N/A	**2nd**
2022	IMSA SportsCar Championship - GTD Pro	Risi Competizione	2	0	0	1	1	608	16th
2022	GT World Challenge Europe Endurance Cup	Iron Lynx	4	0	0	0	1	37	10th
2022	Intercontinental GT Challenge	Iron Lynx	1	0	0	0	0	33	8th
2022	Intercontinental GT Challenge	AF Corse - Francorchamps	1	1	0	0	1	33	8th
2023	FIA World Endurance Championship - Hypercar	Ferrari AF Corse	7	1	0	0	2	114	4th
2023	24 Hours of Le Mans - Hypercar	Ferrari AF Corse	1	1	0	0	1	N/A	**1st**
2023	IMSA SportsCar Championship - GTD Pro	Risi Competizione	1	0	0	0	0	517	20th
2023	IMSA SportsCar Championship - GTD Pro	AF Corse	1	0	0	0	0	517	20th
2024	FIA World Endurance Championship - Hypercar	Ferrari AF Corse	8	0	1	0	1	59	8th
2024	IMSA SportsCar Championship - GTD Pro	Risi Competizione	2	1	0	1	2	722	23rd
2025	FIA World Endurance Championship - Hypercar	Ferrari AF Corse	8	2	2	0	4	133	**1st**
2025	IMSA SportsCar Championship - GTD	Triarsi Competizione	4	0	0	0	1	1021	26th
2025	European Le Mans Series - LMGT3	Kessel Racing	2	0	0	0	1	17	15th
2026	IMSA SportsCar Championship - GTD Pro	Triarsi Competizione	5	0	0	0	0	1240	11th
2026	FIA World Endurance Championship - Hypercar	Ferrari AF Corse	8	0	2	0	3	74	8th

=== Complete Formula Renault UK results ===
(key) (Races in bold indicate pole position; races in italics indicate fastest lap)

Year	Entrant	1	2	3	4	5	6	7	8	9	10	11	12	13	14	15	16	17	18	19	20	DC	Points
2008	Fortec Motorsport	BRH; 1; 14	BRH; 2; 14	ROC; 1; 13	ROC; 2; 8	DON; 1; 5	DON; 2; 14	THR; 1; 3	THR; 2; 9	CRO; 4	SIL; 1; 3	SIL; 2; 9	SNE; 1; 4	**SNE**; **2**; 1	SNE; 3; 2	**OUL**; **1**; 12	OUL; 2; 4	SIL; 1 Ret	SIL; 2 Ret	BRH; 1; 13	BRH; 2; 9	7th	292
2009	Fortec Motorsport	BHI; 1; 5	**BHI**; **2**; 1	THR; 1; 1	**THR**; **2** Ret	DON; 1; 26	DON; 2; 1	**OUL**; **1** Ret	OUL; 2; 4	**CRO**; **1**; 1	**CRO**; **2** Ret	SIL; 1; 2	**SIL**; **2**; 2	**SNE**; **1**; 1	SNE; 2; 3	**SIL**; **1**; 1	**SIL**; **2**; 1	ROC; 1; 2	ROC; 2; 4	BHGP; 1; 8	**BHGP**; **2**; 1	2nd	457

=== Complete Eurocup Formula Renault 2.0 results ===
(key) (Races in bold indicate pole position; races in italics indicate fastest lap)

Year	Entrant	1	2	3	4	5	6	7	8	9	10	11	12	13	14	DC	Points
2009	Fortec Motorsports	CAT; 1; 25†	CAT; 2; 5	SPA; 1; 11	SPA; 2; 7	HUN; 1	HUN; 2	SIL; 1	SIL; 2	LMS; 1; 18	LMS; 2; 11	NÜR; 1	NÜR; 2	ALC; 1	ALC; 2	17th	10

=== Complete British Formula Three Championship results ===
(key) (Races in bold indicate pole position; races in italics indicate fastest lap)

Year	Entrant	1	2	3	4	5	6	7	8	9	10	11	12	13	14	15	16	17	18	19	20	21	22	23	24	25	26	27	28	29	30	DC	Points
2010	Carlin	OUL; 1 Ret	OUL; 2; 11	OUL; 3; 6	**SIL1**; **1**; 1	SIL1; 2; 9	**SIL1**; **3**; 1	MAG; 1; 6	MAG; 2 DNS	MAG; 3; 4	HOC; 1; 4	HOC; 2; 6	HOC; 3; 6	ROC; 1; 4	ROC; 2; 6	ROC; 3; 3	SPA; 1; 2	SPA; 2; 4	SPA; 3; 2	THR; 1; 1	THR; 2; 2	THR; 3; 3	SIL2; 1; 1	SIL2; 2; 5	SIL2; 3; 4	SNE; 1; 8	SNE; 2; 7	SNE; 3; 3	BRH; 1; 2	BRH; 2; 5	BRH; 3; 1	2nd	293

=== Complete GP3 Series results ===
(key) (Races in bold indicate pole position) (Races in italics indicate fastest lap)

Year	Entrant	1	2	3	4	5	6	7	8	9	10	11	12	13	14	15	16	DC	Points
2011	Lotus ART	IST; FEA; 27	IST; SPR; 13	CAT; FEA; 2	CAT; SPR; 21	VAL; FEA; 8	VAL; SPR; 1	SIL; FEA; 6	SIL; SPR; 5	NÜR; FEA; 4	NÜR; SPR; 6	HUN; FEA; 25	HUN; SPR; 3	**SPA**; **FEA**; 2	SPA; SPR; 2	MNZ; FEA; 2	MNZ; SPR; 14	2nd	55

=== Complete GP2 Series results ===
(key) (Races in bold indicate pole position) (Races in italics indicate fastest lap)

Year	Entrant	1	2	3	4	5	6	7	8	9	10	11	12	13	14	15	16	17	18	19	20	21	22	23	24	DC	Points
2012	Lotus GP	SEP; FEA; 8	SEP; SPR; 1	BHR1; FEA; 5	BHR1; SPR; 3	BHR2; FEA; 16	BHR2; SPR; 12	**CAT**; **FEA**; 2	CAT; SPR; 4	MON; FEA; 7	MON; SPR; Ret	**VAL**; **FEA**; 8	VAL; SPR; 2	SIL; FEA; Ret	SIL; SPR; 20†	HOC; FEA; 8	HOC; SPR; 1	HUN; FEA; 4	HUN; SPR; 6	SPA; FEA; 2	SPA; SPR; 3	MNZ; FEA; 12	MNZ; SPR; 14	MRN; FEA; Ret	MRN; SPR; 10	5th	160
2013	ART Grand Prix	SEP; FEA; 2	SEP; SPR; Ret	BHR; FEA; 12	BHR; SPR; 5	CAT; FEA; Ret	CAT; SPR; 11	MON; FEA; 5	MON; SPR; 5	SIL; FEA; 9	SIL; SPR; 3	NÜR; FEA; 2	NÜR; SPR; 2	HUN; FEA; 9	HUN; SPR; 6	SPA; FEA; 8	SPA; SPR; 1	MNZ; FEA; 6	MNZ; SPR; 26	MRN; FEA; 3	MRN; SPR; 19	YMC; FEA; 6	YMC; SPR; 1			3rd	157

==== Complete GP2 Final results ====
(key) (Races in bold indicate pole position) (Races in italics indicate fastest lap)

Year	Entrant	1	2	DC	Points
2011	Lotus ART	YMC; FEA; 8	YMC; SPR; 1	5th	7

=== Complete Formula One participations ===
(key) (Races in bold indicate pole position) (Races in italics indicates fastest lap)

Year	Entrant	Chassis	Engine	1	2	3	4	5	6	7	8	9	10	11	12	13	14	15	16	17	18	19	WDC	Points
2013	Sahara Force India F1 Team	Force India VJM06	Mercedes FO 108Z 2.4 V8	AUS	MAL	CHN	BHR	ESP	MON	CAN	GBR	GER	HUN	BEL	ITA; TD	SIN	KOR; TD	JPN	IND; TD	ABU; TD	USA	BRA; TD	-	-

=== Complete FIA World Endurance Championship results ===
(key) (Races in bold indicate pole position; races in italics indicate fastest lap)

Year	Entrant	Class	Car	Engine	1	2	3	4	5	6	7	8	9	Rank	Points
2014	AF Corse	LMGTE Pro	Ferrari 458 Italia GT2	Ferrari F136 4.5 L V8	SIL; 5	SPA; 3	LMS; WD	COA; 7	FUJ; 2	SHA; 3	BHR; 3	SÃO; 3		7th	94
2015	AF Corse	LMGTE Pro	Ferrari 458 Italia GT2	Ferrari F136 4.5 L V8	SIL; 3	SPA; 7	LMS; 2	NÜR; 3	COA; 3	**FUJ**; 3	SHA; 4	BHR; 6		4th	123
2016	AF Corse	LMGTE Pro	Ferrari 488 GTE	Ferrari F154CB 3.9 L Turbo V8	SIL; 2	SPA; Ret	**LMS**; Ret	NÜR; 1	MEX; 2	COA; 2	FUJ; 3	SHA; 3	BHR; 2	3rd	128
2017	AF Corse	LMGTE Pro	Ferrari 488 GTE	Ferrari F154CB 3.9 L Turbo V8	SIL; 2	SPA; 2	LMS; 14	NÜR; 1	MEX; 6	COA; 1	FUJ; 1	SHA; 3	BHR; 2	1st	153
2018–19	AF Corse	LMGTE Pro	Ferrari 488 GTE Evo	Ferrari F154CB 3.9 L Turbo V8	SPA; 15	LMS; 4	SIL; 1	FUJ; 4	SHA; 5	SEB; 4	SPA; 2	LMS; 1		2nd	136.5
2019–20	AF Corse	LMGTE Pro	Ferrari 488 GTE Evo	Ferrari F154CB 3.9 L Turbo V8	**SIL**; 4	FUJ; 4	SHA; 1	BHR; 4	COA; 3	SPA; 4	LMS; 2	BHR; 12		5th	132
2021	AF Corse	LMGTE Pro	Ferrari 488 GTE Evo	Ferrari F154CB 3.9 L Turbo V8	SPA; 2	ALG; 1	MNZ; 2	LMS; 1	BHR; 3	BHR; 1				1st	177
2022	AF Corse	LMGTE Pro	Ferrari 488 GTE Evo	Ferrari F154CB 3.9 L Turbo V8	SEB; 4	SPA; 1	LMS; 2	**MNZ**; 3	FUJ; 1	BHR; 5				1st	135
2023	Ferrari AF Corse	Hypercar	Ferrari 499P	Ferrari F163CG 3.0 L Turbo V6	SEB; 7	ALG; 6	SPA; 3	LMS; 1	MNZ; 5	FUJ; 5	BHR; 6			4th	114
2024	Ferrari AF Corse	Hypercar	Ferrari 499P	Ferrari F163CG 3.0 L Turbo V6	QAT; 12	IMO; 7	SPA; 4	LMS; 3	SAP; 5	**COA**; Ret	FUJ; Ret	BHR; 14		8th	59
2025	Ferrari AF Corse	Hypercar	Ferrari 499P	Ferrari F163CG 3.0 L Turbo V6	**QAT**; 3	**IMO**; 1	SPA; 1	LMS; 3	SÃO; 11	COA; 5	FUJ; 15	BHR; 4		1st	133
2026	Ferrari AF Corse	Hypercar	Ferrari 499P	Ferrari F163CG 3.0 L Turbo V6	**IMO**; 2	SPA; Ret	LMS; 5	SÃO; 2	**COA**; 11	FUJ; 10	CAT; 15	MNZ; 3		8th	74

=== Complete 24 Hours of Le Mans results ===
Year	Team	Co-Drivers	Car	Class	Laps	Pos.	Class Pos.
2015	(Italy) AF Corse	(Italy) Davide Rigon (Monaco) Olivier Beretta	Ferrari 458 Italia GT2	GTE; Pro	332	21st	**2nd**
2016	(Italy) AF Corse	(Italy) Gianmaria Bruni (Italy) Alessandro Pier Guidi	Ferrari 488 GTE	GTE; Pro	179	DNF	DNF
2017	(Italy) AF Corse	(Italy) Michele Rugolo (Italy) Alessandro Pier Guidi	Ferrari 488 GTE	GTE; Pro	312	46th	11th
2018	(Italy) AF Corse	(Brazil) Daniel Serra (Italy) Alessandro Pier Guidi	Ferrari 488 GTE Evo	GTE; Pro	339	22nd	7th
2019	(Italy) AF Corse	(Brazil) Daniel Serra (Italy) Alessandro Pier Guidi	Ferrari 488 GTE Evo	GTE; Pro	342	20th	**1st**
2020	(Italy) AF Corse	(Brazil) Daniel Serra (Italy) Alessandro Pier Guidi	Ferrari 488 GTE Evo	GTE; Pro	346	21st	**2nd**
2021	(Italy) AF Corse	(France) Côme Ledogar (Italy) Alessandro Pier Guidi	Ferrari 488 GTE Evo	GTE; Pro	345	20th	**1st**
2022	(Italy) AF Corse	(Italy) Alessandro Pier Guidi (Brazil) Daniel Serra	Ferrari 488 GTE Evo	GTE; Pro	350	29th	**2nd**
2023	(Italy) Ferrari AF Corse	(Italy) Antonio Giovinazzi (Italy) Alessandro Pier Guidi	Ferrari 499P	Hypercar	342	**1st**	**1st**
2024	(Italy) Ferrari AF Corse	(Italy) Antonio Giovinazzi (Italy) Alessandro Pier Guidi	Ferrari 499P	Hypercar	311	**3rd**	**3rd**
2025	(Italy) Ferrari AF Corse	(Italy) Antonio Giovinazzi (Italy) Alessandro Pier Guidi	Ferrari 499P	Hypercar	387	**3rd**	**3rd**
2026	(Italy) Ferrari AF Corse	(Italy) Antonio Giovinazzi (Italy) Alessandro Pier Guidi	Ferrari 499P	Hypercar	381	5th	5th

=== Complete European Le Mans Series results ===
(key) (Races in bold indicate pole position; races in italics indicate fastest lap)

Year	Entrant	Class	Chassis	Engine	1	2	3	4	5	6	Rank	Points
2015	JMW Motorsport	LMGTE	Ferrari 458 Italia GT2	Ferrari F136 4.5 L V8	SIL	IMO	RBR	LEC	EST; Ret		18th	0
2025	Kessel Racing	LMGT3	Ferrari 296 GT3	Ferrari F163CE 3.0 L Turbo V6	CAT	LEC; 9	IMO	SPA; 3	SIL	ALG	15th	17

=== Complete IMSA SportsCar Championship results ===
(key) (Races in bold indicate pole position; races in italics indicate fastest lap)

Year	Entrant	Class	Make	Engine	1	2	3	4	5	6	7	8	9	10	11	Rank	Points	Ref
2016	SMP Racing	GTLM	Ferrari 488 GTE	Ferrari F154CB 3.9 L Turbo V8	DAY; 10	SEB	LBH	LGA	WGL	MOS	LRP	ELK	VIR	COA		19th	58	
2016	Risi Competizione	GTLM	Ferrari 488 GTE	Ferrari F154CB 3.9 L Turbo V8											PET; 1	19th	58	
2017	Risi Competizione	GTLM	Ferrari 488 GTE	Ferrari F154CB 3.9 L Turbo V8	DAY; 3	SEB; 3	LBH	COA	WGL	MOS	LRP	ELK	VIR	LGA	PET	18th	60	
2018	Risi Competizione	GTLM	Ferrari 488 GTE	Ferrari F154CB 3.9 L Turbo V8	DAY; 5	SEB; 5	LBH	MDO	WGL	MOS	LIM	ELK	VIR	LGA	PET	17th	52	
2019	Risi Competizione	GTLM	Ferrari 488 GTE	Ferrari F154CB 3.9 L Turbo V8	DAY; 2	SEB	LBH	MDO	WGL	MOS	LIM	ELK	VIR	LGA	**PET**; 1	20th	67	
2020	Risi Competizione	GTLM	Ferrari 488 GTE	Ferrari F154CB 3.9 L Turbo V8	DAY; 6	DAY	SEB	ELK	VIR	ATL	MDO	CLT	PET	LGA	SEB	16th	25	
2021	Risi Competizione	GTLM	Ferrari 488 GTE	Ferrari F154CB 3.9 L Turbo V8	DAY; 4	SEB	DET	WGL	WGL	LIM	ELK	LGA	LBH	VIR	PET	13th	308	
2022	Risi Competizione	GTD Pro	Ferrari 488 GT3 Evo 2020	Ferrari F154CB 3.9 L Turbo V8	DAY; 2	SEB	LBH	LGA	WGL	MOS	LIM	ELK	VIR	PET; 7		16th	608	
2023	Risi Competizione	GTD Pro	Ferrari 296 GT3	Ferrari F163CE 3.0 L Turbo V6	DAY; 10	SEB	LBH	LGA	WGL	MOS	LIM	ELK	VIR	IMS		20th	517	
2023	AF Corse	GTD Pro	Ferrari 296 GT3	Ferrari F163CE 3.0 L Turbo V6											PET; 5	20th	517	
2024	Risi Competizione	GTD Pro	Ferrari 296 GT3	Ferrari F163CE 3.0 L Turbo V6	DAY; 1	SEB; 2	LGA	DET	WGL	MOS	ELK	VIR	IMS	PET		23rd	722	
2025	Triarsi Competizione	GTD	Ferrari 296 GT3	Ferrari F163CE 3.0 L Turbo V6	DAY; 22	SEB	LBH	LGA	WGL; 4	MOS	ELK	VIR	IMS; 7	PET; 2		26th	1021	
2026	Triarsi Competizione	GTD Pro	Ferrari 296 GT3 Evo	Ferrari F163CE 3.0 L Turbo V6	DAY; 8	SEB; 7	LGA	DET	WGL; 6	MOS	ELK; 7	VIR	IMS	PET; 13		11th	1240	

=== Complete GT World Challenge Europe results ===
==== GT World Challenge Europe Endurance Cup ====
(key) (Races in bold indicate pole position; races in italics indicate fastest lap)

Year	Team	Car	Class	1	2	3	4	5	6	7	Pos.	Points
2017	Kaspersky Motorsport	Ferrari 488 GT3	Pro	MNZ; 4	SIL; 23	LEC; Ret	SPA; 6H; 1	SPA; 12H; 3	**SPA**; **24H**; Ret	CAT; 18	7th	32
2019	AF Corse	Ferrari 488 GT3	Pro	MNZ	SIL	LEC	SPA; 6H; 44	SPA; 12H; 57	SPA; 24H; Ret	CAT	NC	0
2020	AF Corse	Ferrari 488 GT3	Pro	IMO; 7 (Note: A drive-through penalty was wrongfully handed out to Calado, Nielsen and Pier Guidi at Imola. A request by the AF Corse team to be awarded with points for second place was accepted by the sporting board.)	NÜR; Ret	SPA; 6H; 4	SPA; 12H; 1	SPA; 24H; 5	LEC		6th	46
2022	Iron Lynx	Ferrari 488 GT3 Evo 2020	Pro	IMO; 7	LEC; 2	SPA; 6H; 5	SPA; 12H; 11	SPA; 24H; 9	HOC; 43†	CAT	10th	37

=== Complete Asian Le Mans Series results ===
(key) (Races in bold indicate pole position; races in italics indicate fastest lap)

Year	Team	Class	Car	Engine	1	2	3	4	Pos.	Points
2018–19	Car Guy Racing	GT	Ferrari 488 GT3	Ferrari F154CB 3.9 L Turbo V8	SHA; 1	**FUJ**; 1	CHA; 1	SEP; 1	1st	101

=== Complete Formula E results ===
(key) (Races in bold indicate pole position; races in italics indicate fastest lap)

Year	Team	Chassis	Powertrain	1	2	3	4	5	6	7	8	9	10	11	Pos	Points
2019–20	Panasonic Jaguar Racing	Spark SRT05e	Jaguar I-Type 4	DIR; 16	DIR; 7	SCL; 8	MEX; DSQ	MRK; 16	BER; 15	BER; 20	BER; Ret	BER; 17	BER	BER	19th	10

== Notes ==
Sporting positions
Preceded by Richard Singleton	Formula Renault UK Winter Cup; Champion; 2008	Succeeded by Harry Tincknell
Preceded by Inaugural	Formula Renault Portugal Winter Series; Champion; 2008	Succeeded by None (Series ended)
Preceded by Nicki Thiim; Marco Sørensen	World Endurance GT Drivers' Championship; Champion; 2017; With: Alessandro Pier Guidi	Succeeded by Michael Christensen; Kevin Estre
Preceded by Jesse Krohn; Jun-San Chen	Asian Le Mans Series; GT Champion; 2018–19; With: Kei Cozzolino & Takeshi Kimura	Succeeded by Marcos Gomes
Preceded by Nicki Thiim; Marco Sørensen	World Endurance GT Drivers' Championship; Champion; 2021-2022; With: Alessandro Pier Guidi	Succeeded by Incumbent
Preceded by Sébastien Buemi; Brendon Hartley; Ryō Hirakawa	Winner of the 24 Hours of Le Mans; 2023; With: Antonio Giovinazzi & Alessandro Pier Guidi	Succeeded by Antonio Fuoco; Miguel Molina; Nicklas Nielsen
Preceded by André Lotterer; Kévin Estre; Laurens Vanthoor	World Endurance Championship; Champion; 2025; With: Antonio Giovinazzi & Alessandro Pier Guidi	Succeeded by Sébastien Buemi; Brendon Hartley; Ryō Hirakawa
