= 2010 British Formula 3 International Series =

Seasons
- ← 2009 2011 →

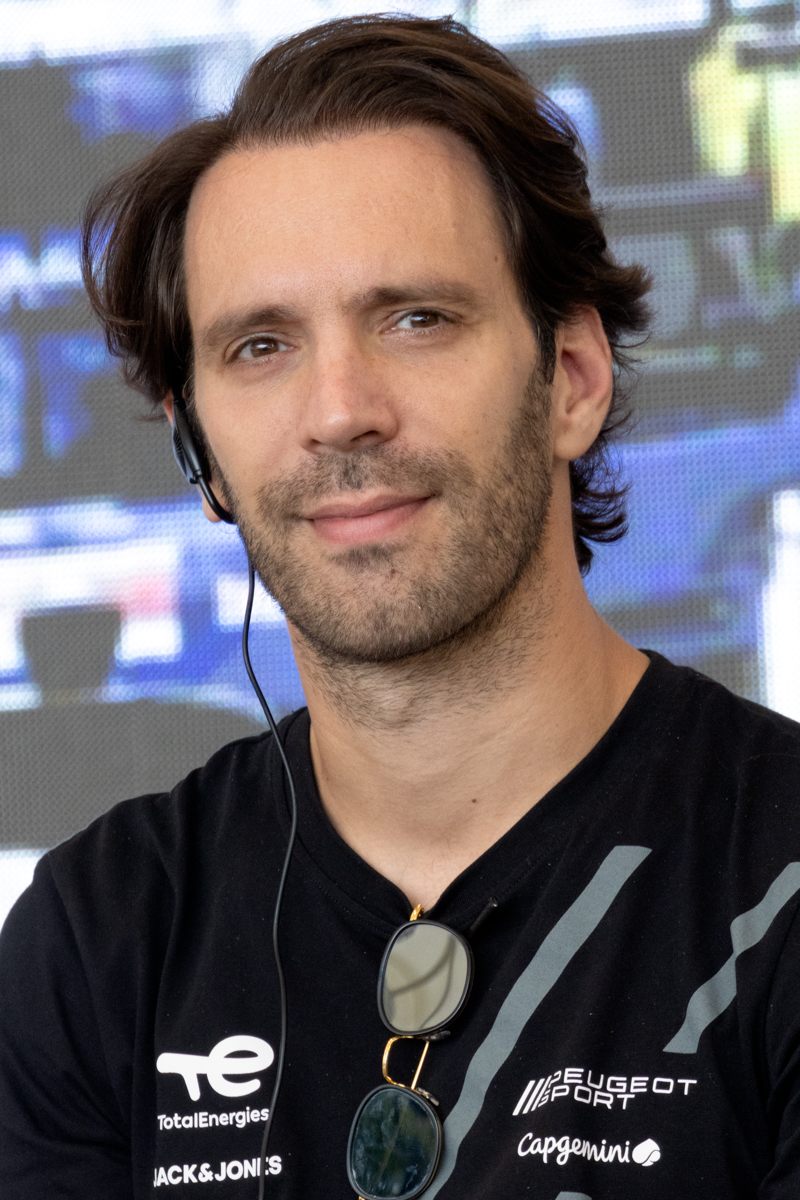
2010 Championship Class champion, Jean-Éric Vergne

The 2010 British Formula 3 International Series was the 60th British Formula 3 International Series season. It began on 3 April at Oulton Park and finished on 26 September at Brands Hatch after 30 races at ten meetings, held in the United Kingdom, France, Germany and Belgium.

For the third season in succession, a Red Bull Junior Team-supported Carlin Motorsport driver won the championship title. Following on from the successes of Jaime Alguersuari in 2008 and Daniel Ricciardo in 2009, Frenchman Jean-Éric Vergne won the title with two meetings to spare after taking twelve victories in the first 24 races. Vergne eventually finished with thirteen victories and 29 points-scoring finishes – his only failure was a mistake in the wet, final race at Brands Hatch when he slid off the road – as he finished 99 points clear of his team-mate James Calado. Both drivers received a Formula Renault 3.5 Series test for their performances. Calado's five wins helped him to fend off Fortec Motorsport's Oliver Webb, a three-time winner, in the battle for second place in the standings.

Webb's early season form of seven top-two placings in the first nine races had given him the championship lead over Vergne and a 48-point advantage over Calado, but the Carlin driver overhauled his rival following an unbroken of points finishes to the end of the season, while Webb suffered four races where he did not score any points, to end up 43 points behind at season's end. A late season surge by a third Carlin driver, Adriano Buzaid put him within reach of Webb's third place at the final round, but Webb eventually held on by twelve points. Buzaid had taken seven successive podiums, including his only two victories of the season coming at Silverstone and Snetterton. Three other race-winners battled for fifth place in the championship, with Felipe Nasr overhauling both Gabriel Dias and Rupert Svendsen-Cook at the final race of the season. The only other drivers to win a race were reigning National Class champion Daniel McKenzie, who took two wins to an eventual tenth place championship finish, and Alexander Sims, who won at Silverstone while competing in one of two guest appearances with his Formula 3 Euro Series team ART Grand Prix.

The National Class for older-specification machinery was an in-house battle between two T-Sport drivers as Menasheh Idafar and James Cole were the only drivers to compete in all of the meetings; only four drivers competed in the class at all in 2010, with Luiz Razia – who competed at the May Silverstone meeting, to learn the circuit ahead of the GP2 Series meeting later in the season – and Juan Carlos Sistos – who contested the August Silverstone and Snetterton meetings – the only others to compete alongside the T-Sport pair. Idafar eventually won the National Class title by 17 points, taking 17 wins to Cole's twelve, including an overall third-place finish at the final race at Brands Hatch. Sistos took the other victory, finishing ahead of Cole and Idafar on his début in the championship.

== Drivers and teams ==
Team	Chassis	Engine	No	Driver	Rounds
Championship Class
(United Kingdom) Carlin	Dallara F308	Volkswagen	1	(Brazil) Adriano Buzaid	All
(United Kingdom) Carlin	Dallara F308	Volkswagen	2	(United Kingdom) James Calado	All
(United Kingdom) Carlin	Dallara F308	Volkswagen	21	(United Kingdom) Rupert Svendsen-Cook	All
(United Kingdom) Carlin	Dallara F308	Volkswagen	22	(Malaysia) Jazeman Jaafar	All
(United Kingdom) Carlin	Dallara F308	Volkswagen	31	(France) Jean-Éric Vergne	All
(United Kingdom) Carlin	Dallara F308	Volkswagen	32	(Brazil) Lucas Foresti	All
(United Kingdom) Hitech Racing	Dallara F310	Volkswagen	3	(United Kingdom) William Buller	All
(United Kingdom) Hitech Racing	Dallara F310	Volkswagen	4	(Brazil) Gabriel Dias	All
(United Kingdom) Fortec Motorsport	Dallara F308	Mercedes HWA	5	(United Kingdom) Daniel McKenzie	All
(United Kingdom) Fortec Motorsport	Dallara F308	Mercedes HWA	6	(United Kingdom) Oliver Webb	All
(United Kingdom) Fortec Motorsport	Dallara F308	Mercedes HWA	9	(Russia) Max Snegirev	All
(United Kingdom) T-Sport	Dallara F310	Volkswagen	7	(United Kingdom) Alex Brundle	All
(United Kingdom) Räikkönen Robertson Racing	Dallara F308	Mercedes HWA	8	(Japan) Daisuke Nakajima	All
(United Kingdom) Räikkönen Robertson Racing	Dallara F308	Mercedes HWA	26	(Colombia) Carlos Huertas	All
(United Kingdom) Räikkönen Robertson Racing	Dallara F308	Mercedes HWA	27	(Brazil) Felipe Nasr	All
(United Kingdom) Litespeed F3	Dallara F308	Mercedes HWA	14	(United Kingdom) Jay Bridger	All
(United Kingdom) Sino Vision Racing	Dallara F308	Mercedes HWA	17	(Taiwan) Kevin Chen	2
(United Kingdom) Sino Vision Racing	Dallara F308	Mercedes HWA	17	(United Kingdom) Wayne Boyd	4
(United Kingdom) Sino Vision Racing	Dallara F308	Mercedes HWA	18	(China) Adderly Fong	All
(United Kingdom) CF Racing with Manor Motorsport	Dallara F308	Mercedes HWA	25	(United Kingdom) Hywel Lloyd	All
(United Kingdom) CF Racing with Manor Motorsport	Dallara F308	Mercedes HWA	28	(Indonesia) Rio Haryanto	2–3
(United Kingdom) CF Racing with Manor Motorsport	Dallara F308	Mercedes HWA	28	(Brazil) Yann Cunha	8
National Class
(United Kingdom) T-Sport	Dallara F307	Mugen-Honda	43	(Bahrain) Menasheh Idafar	All
(United Kingdom) T-Sport	Dallara F307	Mugen-Honda	44	(United Kingdom) James Cole	All
(United Kingdom) Motul Team West-Tec	Dallara F307	Mugen-Honda	46	(Brazil) Luiz Razia	2
(United Kingdom) Motul Team West-Tec	Dallara F307	Mugen-Honda	46	(Mexico) Juan Carlos Sistos	8–9
Invitation Entries
(Germany) Mücke Motorsport	Dallara F308	Mercedes HWA	71	(Colombia) Carlos Muñoz	6, 8
(United Kingdom) Hitech Racing	Dallara F309	Volkswagen	77	(Brazil) Pietro Fantin	5, 8, 10
(France) ART Grand Prix	Dallara F308	Mercedes HWA	90	(Mexico) Esteban Gutiérrez	2
(France) ART Grand Prix	Dallara F308	Mercedes HWA	90	(France) Nathanaël Berthon	6
(France) ART Grand Prix	Dallara F308	Mercedes HWA	91	(United Kingdom) Alexander Sims	2, 6
(France) ART Grand Prix	Dallara F308	Mercedes HWA	92	(France) Jim Pla	2, 6
(Italy) Prema Powerteam	Dallara F309	Mercedes HWA	93	(Spain) Daniel Juncadella	6
(Italy) Prema Powerteam	Dallara F309	Mercedes HWA	94	(France) Nicolas Marroc	6

== Calendar ==
The calendar was announced on 7 January 2010. It consisted of ten rounds, with three races at each round. A race weekend consisted of a half-hour first race, a 20-minute "half points" sprint featuring a "semi-reverse" grid, and finally a 40-minute feature race designed to place the emphasis on driver stamina, racecraft and mechanical reliability. From Rockingham onwards, pit stops were implemented during the 20-minute race, in which drivers had to pit inside a 15-minute pit stop window.

Round		Circuit	Date	Pole position	Fastest lap	Winning driver	Winning team	National Class Winner	Supporting
1	R1	(United Kingdom) Oulton Park	3 April	(France) Jean-Éric Vergne	(France) Jean-Éric Vergne	(France) Jean-Éric Vergne	(United Kingdom) Carlin	(Bahrain) Menasheh Idafar	British GT
1	R2	(United Kingdom) Oulton Park	5 April		(France) Jean-Éric Vergne	(United Kingdom) Rupert Svendsen-Cook	(United Kingdom) Carlin	(Bahrain) Menasheh Idafar	British GT
1	R3	(United Kingdom) Oulton Park	5 April	(France) Jean-Éric Vergne	(France) Jean-Éric Vergne	(France) Jean-Éric Vergne	(United Kingdom) Carlin	(United Kingdom) James Cole	British GT
2	R4	(United Kingdom) Silverstone (Arena)	1 May	(United Kingdom) James Calado	(United Kingdom) James Calado	(United Kingdom) James Calado	(United Kingdom) Carlin	(United Kingdom) James Cole	FIA GT1 World Championship
2	R5	(United Kingdom) Silverstone (Arena)	2 May		(Brazil) Adriano Buzaid^{1}	(United Kingdom) Alexander Sims	(France) ART Grand Prix	(Bahrain) Menasheh Idafar	FIA GT1 World Championship
2	R6	(United Kingdom) Silverstone (Arena)	2 May	(United Kingdom) James Calado	(United Kingdom) Oliver Webb	(United Kingdom) James Calado	(United Kingdom) Carlin	(United Kingdom) James Cole	FIA GT1 World Championship
3	R7	(France) Magny-Cours	22 May	(France) Jean-Éric Vergne	(United Kingdom) Oliver Webb	(United Kingdom) Oliver Webb	(United Kingdom) Fortec Motorsport	(Bahrain) Menasheh Idafar	Superleague Formula
3	R8	(France) Magny-Cours	23 May		(France) Jean-Éric Vergne	(France) Jean-Éric Vergne	(United Kingdom) Carlin	(United Kingdom) James Cole	Superleague Formula
3	R9	(France) Magny-Cours	23 May	(France) Jean-Éric Vergne	(United Kingdom) Oliver Webb	(United Kingdom) Oliver Webb	(United Kingdom) Fortec Motorsport	(United Kingdom) James Cole	Superleague Formula
4	R10	(Germany) Hockenheim	29 May	(France) Jean-Éric Vergne	(France) Jean-Éric Vergne	(France) Jean-Éric Vergne	(United Kingdom) Carlin	(United Kingdom) James Cole	ADAC GT Masters
4	R11	(Germany) Hockenheim	30 May		(Brazil) Gabriel Dias	(Brazil) Gabriel Dias	(United Kingdom) Hitech Racing	(United Kingdom) James Cole	ADAC GT Masters
4	R12	(Germany) Hockenheim	30 May	(France) Jean-Éric Vergne	(France) Jean-Éric Vergne	(France) Jean-Éric Vergne	(United Kingdom) Carlin	(Bahrain) Menasheh Idafar	ADAC GT Masters
5	R13	(United Kingdom) Rockingham	17 July	(United Kingdom) Oliver Webb	(France) Jean-Éric Vergne	(France) Jean-Éric Vergne	(United Kingdom) Carlin	(Bahrain) Menasheh Idafar	British GT
5	R14	(United Kingdom) Rockingham	18 July		(United Kingdom) Daniel McKenzie	(United Kingdom) Daniel McKenzie	(United Kingdom) Fortec Motorsport	(Bahrain) Menasheh Idafar	British GT
5	R15	(United Kingdom) Rockingham	18 July	(United Kingdom) Oliver Webb	(Brazil) Felipe Nasr	(Brazil) Felipe Nasr	(United Kingdom) Räikkönen Robertson Racing	(United Kingdom) James Cole	British GT
6	R16	(Belgium) Spa-Francorchamps	30 July	(France) Jean-Éric Vergne	(France) Jean-Éric Vergne	(France) Jean-Éric Vergne	(United Kingdom) Carlin	(Bahrain) Menasheh Idafar	FIA GT1 World Championship; 24 Hours of Spa
6	R17	(Belgium) Spa-Francorchamps	30 July		(Brazil) Felipe Nasr	(France) Jean-Éric Vergne	(United Kingdom) Carlin	(Bahrain) Menasheh Idafar	FIA GT1 World Championship; 24 Hours of Spa
6	R18	(Belgium) Spa-Francorchamps	31 July	(United Kingdom) Oliver Webb	(France) Jean-Éric Vergne	(France) Jean-Éric Vergne	(United Kingdom) Carlin	(United Kingdom) James Cole	FIA GT1 World Championship; 24 Hours of Spa
7	R19	(United Kingdom) Thruxton	7 August	(France) Jean-Éric Vergne	(United Kingdom) James Calado	(United Kingdom) James Calado	(United Kingdom) Carlin	(United Kingdom) James Cole	British Truck Grand Prix
7	R20	(United Kingdom) Thruxton	8 August		(France) Jean-Éric Vergne	(France) Jean-Éric Vergne	(United Kingdom) Carlin	(United Kingdom) James Cole	British Truck Grand Prix
7	R21	(United Kingdom) Thruxton	8 August	(France) Jean-Éric Vergne	(France) Jean-Éric Vergne	(France) Jean-Éric Vergne	(United Kingdom) Carlin	(Bahrain) Menasheh Idafar	British Truck Grand Prix
8	R22	(United Kingdom) Silverstone (Bridge)	14 August	(France) Jean-Éric Vergne	(France) Jean-Éric Vergne	(United Kingdom) James Calado	(United Kingdom) Carlin	(Mexico) Juan Carlos Sistos	British GT
8	R23	(United Kingdom) Silverstone (Bridge)	15 August		(Colombia) Carlos Huertas	(Brazil) Adriano Buzaid	(United Kingdom) Carlin	(United Kingdom) James Cole	British GT
8	R24	(United Kingdom) Silverstone (Bridge)	15 August	(France) Jean-Éric Vergne	(France) Jean-Éric Vergne	(France) Jean-Éric Vergne	(United Kingdom) Carlin	(Bahrain) Menasheh Idafar	British GT
9	R25	(United Kingdom) Snetterton	29 August	(Brazil) Adriano Buzaid	(United Kingdom) William Buller	(France) Jean-Éric Vergne	(United Kingdom) Carlin	(Bahrain) Menasheh Idafar	British GT
9	R26	(United Kingdom) Snetterton	30 August		(United Kingdom) James Calado	(Brazil) Gabriel Dias	(United Kingdom) Hitech Racing	(Bahrain) Menasheh Idafar	British GT
9	R27	(United Kingdom) Snetterton	30 August	(Brazil) Adriano Buzaid	(Brazil) Adriano Buzaid	(Brazil) Adriano Buzaid	(United Kingdom) Carlin	(Bahrain) Menasheh Idafar	British GT
10	R28	(United Kingdom) Brands Hatch	25 September	(United Kingdom) Oliver Webb	(United Kingdom) Oliver Webb	(United Kingdom) Oliver Webb	(United Kingdom) Fortec Motorsport	(Bahrain) Menasheh Idafar	British GT
10	R29	(United Kingdom) Brands Hatch	26 September		(Brazil) Felipe Nasr	(United Kingdom) Daniel McKenzie	(United Kingdom) Fortec Motorsport	(Bahrain) Menasheh Idafar	British GT
10	R30	(United Kingdom) Brands Hatch	26 September	(United Kingdom) Daniel McKenzie	(United Kingdom) James Calado	(United Kingdom) James Calado	(United Kingdom) Carlin	(Bahrain) Menasheh Idafar	British GT

- ^{1} Fastest lap recorded by Alexander Sims, but he was ineligible to score the fastest lap point.

== Standings ==
With an extra round at each meeting, the championship's point system was altered slightly for the 2010 season. The first and third races offered points using the system that had been used in 2009 (20-15-12-10-8-6-4-3-2-1), with an extra point for the fastest lap. The second race again saw the top ten being awarded points, but the points system rewarded less points; using the points scale 10-9-8-7-6-5-4-3-2-1, with two points for fastest lap.

Pos	Driver	OUL (United Kingdom)			SIL (United Kingdom)			MAG (France)			HOC (Germany)			ROC (United Kingdom)			SPA (Belgium)			THR (United Kingdom)			SIL (United Kingdom)			SNE (United Kingdom)			BRH (United Kingdom)			Pts
Championship Class
1	(France) Jean-Éric Vergne	1	5	1	4	5	6	4	1	2	1	5	1	1	9	2	1	1	1	2	1	1	2	3	1	1	8	2	8	4	Ret	392
2	(United Kingdom) James Calado	Ret	11	6	1	9	1	6	DNS	4	4	6	6	4	6	3	2	4	2	1	2	3	1	5	4	8	7	3	2	5	1	293
3	(United Kingdom) Oliver Webb	2	8	2	2	22	2	1	2	1	8	2	11	3	8	6	4	5	23	5	3	2	9	7	3	4	15	Ret	1	7	10	250
4	(Brazil) Adriano Buzaid	3	4	5	9	6	5	8	11	11	5	3	4	9	3	4	5	Ret	9	4	6	4	4	1	2	2	2	1	3	3	9	238
5	(Brazil) Felipe Nasr	Ret	14	Ret	DNS	10	3	Ret	6	7	Ret	13	Ret	7	15	1	7	2	5	7	Ret	6	5	4	12	3	5	5	10	9	7	136
6	(Brazil) Gabriel Dias	7	Ret	4	8	2	8	2	17	3	7	1	5	6	4	Ret	Ret	11	4	11	9	Ret	11	14	7	6	1	8	NC	14	Ret	135
7	(United Kingdom) Rupert Svendsen-Cook	5	1	3	10	Ret	11	18	10	6	12	9	8	11	13	Ret	3	7	7	3	4	5	6	6	6	Ret	14	10	4	6	Ret	131
8	(United Kingdom) William Buller	10	9	11	12	21	10	3	3	13	10	7	2	5	5	5	Ret	15	15	9	Ret	12	Ret	13	9	7	3	9	6	17	2	111
9	(United Kingdom) Daniel McKenzie	9	7	10	15	13	15	13	8	5	3	11	16	8	1	12	6	3	10	8	5	9	8	10	10	9	6	12	7	1	6	109
10	(Colombia) Carlos Huertas	4	3	12	5	8	Ret	5	DNS	16	11	10	14	2	7	Ret	Ret	Ret	22	10	8	13	7	2	17	11	19	7	5	2	8	104
11	(Japan) Daisuke Nakajima	6	2	7	3	3	21	9	4	Ret	16	Ret	7	10	2	Ret	20	9	Ret	Ret	Ret	14	10	19	11	5	4	4	9	8	Ret	97
12	(Malaysia) Jazeman Jaafar	8	6	13	7	7	7	7	DSQ	10	2	8	3	Ret	11	14	15	Ret	8	13	7	Ret	12	8	13	10	9	6	16	12	11	85
13	(Brazil) Lucas Foresti	17	15	15	14	14	12	Ret	7	9	13	12	9	12	10	11	8	Ret	Ret	6	17	7	3	12	5	14	12	13	15	13	Ret	45
14	(United Kingdom) Jay Bridger	18	12	8	18	15	Ret	10	9	Ret	6	4	12	Ret	17	10	16	16	13	12	10	8	18	20	16	17	13	16	12	11	5	37
15	(United Kingdom) Hywel Lloyd	14	18	DNS	22	20	14	14	5	8	20	18	15	Ret	14	9	9	8	12	Ret	12	Ret	14	9	15	Ret	17	11	18	16	Ret	23
16	(China) Adderly Fong	16	17	16	23	Ret	19	16	16	Ret	14	Ret	Ret	18	20	13	23	18	Ret	15	15	Ret	Ret	24	18	12	16	20	Ret	Ret	4	12
17	(United Kingdom) Alex Brundle	15	10	9	13	11	20	Ret	12	Ret	15	14	10	16	12	15	18	17	21	Ret	11	10	16	18	8	13	11	19	13	10	Ret	11
18	(Russia) Max Snegirev	13	16	14	19	Ret	16	15	15	14	19	Ret	18	15	18	Ret	22	19	18	Ret	16	Ret	13	15	Ret	16	10	15	19	20	Ret	1
19	(United Kingdom) Wayne Boyd										17	17	13																			0
20	(Indonesia) Rio Haryanto				21	19	Ret	17	14	Ret																						0
21	(Brazil) Yann Cunha																						20	22	22							0
22	(Taiwan) Kevin Chen				24	DNS	DNS																									0
guest drivers ineligible for points
	(United Kingdom) Alexander Sims				11	1	4										13	10	3													0
	(Mexico) Esteban Gutiérrez				6	4	9																									0
	(Spain) Daniel Juncadella																10	Ret	6													0
	(Colombia) Carlos Muñoz																11	6	17				15	11	17							0
	(France) Jim Pla				16	12	13										17	Ret	11													0
	(France) Nathanaël Berthon																19	13	16													0
	(France) Nicolas Marroc																14	Ret	14													0
	(Brazil) Pietro Fantin													17	16	Ret							Ret	21	23				14	18	Ret	0
National Class
1	(United Kingdom) Menasheh Idafar	11	13	Ret	DNS	16	18	11	18	15	18	16	17	13	18	8	12	12	20	Ret	13	11	21	17	14	15	18	14	11	15	3	435
2	(United Kingdom) James Cole	12	Ret	17	17	17	17	12	13	12	9	15	Ret	14	20	7	21	14	19	14	14	15	19	16	20	18	20	17	17	19	12	418
3	(Mexico) Juan Carlos Sistos																						17	23	21	19	21	18				72
4	(Brazil) Luiz Razia				20	18	Ret																									23
Pos	Driver	OUL (United Kingdom)			SIL (United Kingdom)			MAG (France)			HOC (Germany)			ROC (United Kingdom)			SPA (Belgium)			THR (United Kingdom)			SIL (United Kingdom)			SNE (United Kingdom)			BRH (United Kingdom)			Pts

== See also ==
- 2010 Formula 3 Euro Series season
- 2010 GP3 Series
- 2010 Masters of Formula 3
- 2010 Macau Grand Prix
