= Menasheh Idafar =

- Nationality: Bahrain; United Kingdom
- Born: 13 March 1991 (age 35) London, England

British Formula 3 Championship career
- Debut season: 2010
- Current team: T-Sport
- Car number: 43
- Starts: 29
- Wins: 0
- Poles: 0
- Fastest laps: 0

Previous series
- 2009 2007–2008 2006: Formula Renault UK; BARC Formula Renault; Thunder Arabia Middle Eastern Series

Menasheh Idafar (Arabic: منشية ايدافار, born 13 March 1991) is a British-Bahraini racing driver. In 2010, he competed in the British Formula 3 Championship and won the National Class.

== Early life ==
Menasheh is a part of the small Jewish community of Bahrain. His father is Salman Idafar (a British Jew) and his mother is Bahraini politician Houda Nonoo (a Bahraini Jew) who was the first Jew, and the third woman, to be appointed ambassador of Bahrain.

Sporting positions
Preceded by Daniel McKenzie	British Formula 3 National Class; Champion; 2010	Succeeded by Kotaro Sakurai; British F3 Rookie Championship
