= 2009 Oschersleben Formula Two round =

(Germany) 2009 Oschersleben Formula Two round
Round details
- Round 6 of 8 in the 2009 FIA Formula Two Championship.
- Location: Motorsport Arena Oschersleben, Oschersleben, Germany
- Course: Permanent racing facility 3.696 km (2.297 mi)

First race
- Date: 5 September 2009
- Laps: 25
Pole position
- Driver: (Spain) Andy Soucek
- Time: 1:20.402
Podium
- First: (Spain) Andy Soucek
- Second: (Italy) Mirko Bortolotti
- Third: (Lithuania) Kazim Vasiliauskas
Fastest lap
- Driver: (Spain) Andy Soucek
- Time: 1:21.449 (on lap 5)

Second race
- Date: 6 September 2009
- Laps: 18
Pole position
- Driver: (Russia) Mikhail Aleshin
- Time: 1:22.131
Podium
- First: (Russia) Mikhail Aleshin
- Second: (Spain) Andy Soucek
- Third: (France) Julien Jousse
Fastest lap
- Driver: (Serbia) Miloš Pavlović
- Time: 1:21.731 (on lap 15)

The 2009 Oschersleben Formula Two round was the sixth round of the 2009 FIA Formula Two Championship season. It was held on 5 and 6 September 2009 at Motorsport Arena Oschersleben at Oschersleben, Germany. The first race was won by Andy Soucek, with Mirko Bortolotti and Kazim Vasiliauskas also on the podium. The second race was won by Mikhail Aleshin, with Andy Soucek and Julien Jousse also on the podium.

== Classification ==
=== Qualifying 1 ===
Weather/Track: Sun 19°/Dry 21°

Pos	No	Name	Time	Grid
1	22	(Spain) Andy Soucek	1:20.402	1
2	14	(Italy) Mirko Bortolotti	1:20.789	2
3	12	(Canada) Robert Wickens	1:20.794	3
4	4	(France) Julien Jousse	1:20.862	4
5	25	(Serbia) Miloš Pavlović	1:21.112	5
6	21	(Lithuania) Kazim Vasiliauskas	1:21.253	6
7	8	(Germany) Tobias Hegewald	1:21.297	7
8	15	(Brazil) Carlos Iaconelli	1:21.335	8
9	5	(United Kingdom) Alex Brundle	1:21.407	9
10	15	(Russia) Mikhail Aleshin	1:21.416	10
11	2	(Sweden) Sebastian Hohenthal	1:21.498	11
12	18	(Switzerland) Natacha Gachnang	1:21.498	12
13	10	(Italy) Nicola de Marco	1:21.512	13
14	33	(Austria) Philipp Eng	1:21.523	14
15	11	(United Kingdom) Jack Clarke	1:21.572	15
16	20	(Germany) Jens Höing	1:21.650	16
17	16	(Italy) Edoardo Piscopo	1:21.690	17
18	3	(United Kingdom) Jolyon Palmer	1:21.839	18
19	23	(Finland) Henri Karjalainen	1:21.908	19
20	31	(United Kingdom) Jason Moore	1:22.007	20
21	6	(India) Armaan Ebrahim	1:22.054	21
22	44	(United Kingdom) Ollie Hancock	1:22.440	22
23	24	(United Kingdom) Tom Gladdis	1:22.908	23
24	9	(Italy) Pietro Gandolfi	1:23.872	24
25	27	(Spain) Germán Sánchez	1:24.338	25

=== Qualifying 2 ===
Weather/Track: Cloud 15°/Wet 15°

Pos	No	Name	Time	Grid
1	15	(Russia) Mikhail Aleshin	1:16.947	1
2	4	(France) Julien Jousse	1:16.975	2
3	22	(Spain) Andy Soucek	1:17.108	3
4	14	(Italy) Mirko Bortolotti	1:17.207	4
5	12	(Canada) Robert Wickens	1:17.299	5
6	5	(United Kingdom) Alex Brundle	1:17.398	6
7	10	(Italy) Nicola de Marco	1:17.423	7
8	8	(Germany) Tobias Hegewald	1:17.463	8
9	2	(Sweden) Sebastian Hohenthal	1:17.476	9
10	31	(United Kingdom) Jason Moore	1:17.481	10
11	21	(Lithuania) Kazim Vasiliauskas	1:17.506	11
12	18	(Switzerland) Natacha Gachnang	1:17.512	12
13	20	(Germany) Jens Höing	1:17.637	13
14	16	(Italy) Edoardo Piscopo	1:17.664	14
15	15	(Brazil) Carlos Iaconelli	1:17.692	15
16	23	(Finland) Henri Karjalainen	1:17.709	16
17	6	(India) Armaan Ebrahim	1:17.733	17
18	44	(United Kingdom) Ollie Hancock	1:17.801	18
19	27	(Spain) Germán Sánchez	1:17.822	19
20	9	(Italy) Pietro Gandolfi	1:18.084	20
21	24	(United Kingdom) Tom Gladdis	1:18.172	21
22	33	(Austria) Philipp Eng	1:18.247	22
23	25	(Serbia) Miloš Pavlović	1:18.628	23
24	3	(United Kingdom) Jolyon Palmer	1:19.754	24
25	11	(United Kingdom) Jack Clarke	1:35.908	25

=== Race 1 ===
Weather/Track: Cloud 17°/Dry 22°

Pos	No	Driver	Laps	Time/Retired	Grid	Points
1	22	(Spain) Andy Soucek	24	38:15.756	1	10
2	14	(Italy) Mirko Bortolotti	24	+6.466	2	8
3	21	(Lithuania) Kazim Vasiliauskas	24	+11.169	6	6
4	17	(Brazil) Carlos Iaconelli	24	+17.794	8	5
5	15	(Russia) Mikhail Aleshin	24	+18.747	10	4
6	10	(Italy) Nicola de Marco	24	+19.217	13	3
7	11	(United Kingdom) Jack Clarke	24	+28.770	15	2
8	12	(Canada) Robert Wickens	24	+29.351	3	1
9	6	(India) Armaan Ebrahim	24	+34.990	21	
10	44	(United Kingdom) Ollie Hancock	24	+37.245	22	
11	18	(Switzerland) Natacha Gachnang	24	+37.626	12	
12	16	(Italy) Edoardo Piscopo	24	+38.238	17	
13	23	(Finland) Henri Karjalainen	24	+40.863	19	
14	31	(United Kingdom) Jason Moore	24	+45.933	20	
15	3	(United Kingdom) Jolyon Palmer	24	+46.433	18	
16	24	(United Kingdom) Tom Gladdis	24	+48.289	23	
17	2	(Sweden) Sebastian Hohenthal	22	+ 2 laps	11	
NC	9	(Italy) Pietro Gandolfi	20	+ 4 laps	24	
Ret	5	(United Kingdom) Alex Brundle	10	DNF	9	
Ret	27	(Spain) Germán Sánchez	4	DNF	25	
Ret	4	(France) Julien Jousse	0	DNF	4	
Ret	8	(Germany) Tobias Hegewald	0	DNF	7	
Ret	20	(Germany) Jens Höing	0	DNF	16	
Ret	25	(Serbia) Miloš Pavlović	0	DNF	5	
Ret	33	(Austria) Philipp Eng	0	DNF	14	
Fastest lap: Andy Soucek 1:21.449 (163.36 km/h) on lap 5

=== Race 2 ===
Weather/Track: Cloud 15°/Dry 18°

Pos	No	Driver	Laps	Time/Retired	Grid	Points
1	15	(Russia) Mikhail Aleshin	18	24:50.757	1	10
2	22	(Spain) Andy Soucek	18	+0.479	3	8
3	4	(France) Julien Jousse	18	+1.061	2	6
4	12	(Canada) Robert Wickens	18	+2.914	5	5
5	10	(Italy) Nicola de Marco	18	+3.642	7	4
6	8	(Germany) Tobias Hegewald	18	+4.427	8	3
7	21	(Lithuania) Kazim Vasiliauskas	18	+5.381	11	2
8	16	(Italy) Edoardo Piscopo	18	+13.290	14	1
9	2	(Sweden) Sebastian Hohenthal	18	+15.193	9	
10	17	(Brazil) Carlos Iaconelli	18	+17.116	15	
11	5	(United Kingdom) Alex Brundle	18	+21.277	6	
12	18	(Switzerland) Natacha Gachnang	18	+22.307	12	
13	6	(India) Armaan Ebrahim	18	+23.396	17	
14	20	(Germany) Jens Höing	18	+31.229	13	
15	23	(Finland) Henri Karjalainen	18	+31.860	16	
16	27	(Spain) Germán Sánchez	18	+32.808	19	
17	24	(United Kingdom) Tom Gladdis	18	+33.227	21	
18	44	(United Kingdom) Ollie Hancock	18	+34.128	18	
19	3	(United Kingdom) Jolyon Palmer	18	+34.739	24	
20	31	(United Kingdom) Jason Moore	18	+35.142	10	
21	25	(Serbia) Miloš Pavlović	18	+41.805	23	
22	9	(Italy) Pietro Gandolfi	18	+53.269	20	
Ret	14	(Italy) Mirko Bortolotti	15	DNF	4	
Ret	11	(United Kingdom) Jack Clarke	0	DNF	25	
Ret	33	(Austria) Philipp Eng	0	DNF	22	
Fastest lap: Miloš Pavlović 1:21.731 (162.79 km/h) on lap 15

== Standings after the race ==
Drivers' Championship standings

Pos	Driver	Points
1	(Spain) Andy Soucek	79
2	(Russia) Mikhail Aleshin	47
3	(Canada) Robert Wickens	45
4	(France) Julien Jousse	43
5	(Italy) Mirko Bortolotti	39
