= 2009 Imola Formula Two round =

(Italy) 2009 Imola Formula Two round
Round details
- Round 7 of 8 in the 2009 FIA Formula Two Championship.
- Location: Autodromo Enzo e Dino Ferrari, Imola, Italy
- Course: Permanent racing facility 4.909 km (3.050 mi)

First race
- Date: 19 September 2009
- Laps: 21
Pole position
- Driver: (Lithuania) Kazim Vasiliauskas
- Time: 1:38.468
Podium
- First: (Lithuania) Kazim Vasiliauskas
- Second: (Italy) Mirko Bortolotti
- Third: (Spain) Andy Soucek
Fastest lap
- Driver: (Lithuania) Kazim Vasiliauskas
- Time: 1:38.959 (on lap 21)

Second race
- Date: 20 September 2009
- Laps: 15
Pole position
- Driver: (Canada) Robert Wickens
- Time: 1:37.401
Podium
- First: (Spain) Andy Soucek
- Second: (Canada) Robert Wickens
- Third: (Serbia) Miloš Pavlović
Fastest lap
- Driver: (Canada) Robert Wickens
- Time: 1:38.576 (on lap 12)

The 2009 Imola Formula Two round was the seventh and penultimate round of the 2009 FIA Formula Two Championship season. It was held on 19 and 20 September 2009 at Autodromo Enzo e Dino Ferrari at Imola, Italy. The first race was won by Kazim Vasiliauskas, with Mirko Bortolotti and Andy Soucek also on the podium. The second race was won by Andy Soucek, with Robert Wickens and Miloš Pavlović also on the podium. Soucek's third place in race one earned him the championship, as Wickens and Mikhail Aleshin had insufficient points to overhaul the Spaniard's points tally.

== Classification ==
=== Qualifying 1 ===
Weather/Track: Sun 27°/Dry 41°

Pos	No	Name	Time	Grid
1	21	(Lithuania) Kazim Vasiliauskas	1:38.468	1
2	14	(Italy) Mirko Bortolotti	1:38.781	2
3	15	(Russia) Mikhail Aleshin	1:38.869	3
4	12	(Canada) Robert Wickens	1:38.901	4
5	33	(Austria) Philipp Eng	1:39.006	5
6	22	(Spain) Andy Soucek	1:39.328	6
7	2	(Sweden) Sebastian Hohenthal	1:39.450	7
8	27	(Spain) Germán Sánchez	1:39.668	8
9	4	(France) Julien Jousse	1:39.687	9
10	16	(Italy) Edoardo Piscopo	1:39.731	10
11	10	(Italy) Nicola de Marco	1:39.874	11
12	8	(Germany) Tobias Hegewald	1:39.934	12
13	18	(Switzerland) Natacha Gachnang	1:39.939	13
14	25	(Serbia) Miloš Pavlović	1:40.068	14
15	17	(Brazil) Carlos Iaconelli	1:40.244	15
16	5	(United Kingdom) Alex Brundle	1:40.249	16
17	24	(United Kingdom) Tom Gladdis	1:40.281	17
18	23	(Finland) Henri Karjalainen	1:40.286	18
19	3	(United Kingdom) Jolyon Palmer	1:40.436	19
20	31	(United Kingdom) Jason Moore	1:40.568	20
21	11	(United Kingdom) Jack Clarke	1:40.733	21
22	44	(United Kingdom) Ollie Hancock	1:40.771	22
23	20	(Germany) Jens Höing	1:40.990	23
24	9	(Italy) Pietro Gandolfi	1:41.202	24
25	6	(India) Armaan Ebrahim	13:17.010	25

=== Race 1 ===
Weather/Track: Sun 21°/Dry 33°

Pos	No	Driver	Laps	Time/Retired	Grid	Points
1	21	(Lithuania) Kazim Vasiliauskas	21	38:30.024	1	10
2	14	(Italy) Mirko Bortolotti	21	+7.503	2	8
3	22	(Spain) Andy Soucek	21	+8.178	6	6
4	12	(Canada) Robert Wickens	21	+8.999	4	5
5	33	(Austria) Philipp Eng	21	+9.526	5	4
6	25	(Serbia) Miloš Pavlović	21	+11.940	14	3
7	15	(Russia) Mikhail Aleshin	21	+18.292	3	2
8	27	(Spain) Germán Sánchez	21	+22.781	8	1
9	2	(Sweden) Sebastian Hohenthal	21	+23.582	7	
10	4	(France) Julien Jousse	21	+23.875	9	
11	23	(Finland) Henri Karjalainen	21	+28.343	18	
12	3	(United Kingdom) Jolyon Palmer	21	+34.577	19	
13	16	(Italy) Edoardo Piscopo	21	+34.711	10	
14	11	(United Kingdom) Jack Clarke	21	+37.643	21	
15	18	(Switzerland) Natacha Gachnang	21	+38.316	13	
16	24	(United Kingdom) Tom Gladdis	21	+40.480	17	
17	5	(United Kingdom) Alex Brundle	21	+1:20.097	16	
18	31	(United Kingdom) Jason Moore	21	+1:28.959	20	
Ret	17	(Brazil) Carlos Iaconelli	4	DNF	15	
Ret	20	(Germany) Jens Höing	4	DNF	23	
Ret	6	(India) Armaan Ebrahim	3	DNF	25	
Ret	10	(Italy) Nicola de Marco	0	DNF	11	
Ret	8	(Germany) Tobias Hegewald	0	DNF	12	
Ret	9	(Italy) Pietro Gandolfi	0	DNF	24	
Ret	44	(United Kingdom) Ollie Hancock	0	DNF	22	
Fastest lap: Kazim Vasiliauskas 1:38.959 (178.58 km/h) on lap 21

=== Qualifying 2 ===
Weather/Track: Sun 21°/Dry 33°

Pos	No	Name	Time	Grid
1	12	(Canada) Robert Wickens	1:37.401	1
2	14	(Italy) Mirko Bortolotti	1:37.516	2
3	22	(Spain) Andy Soucek	1:37.556	3
4	25	(Serbia) Miloš Pavlović	1:37.823	4
5	21	(Lithuania) Kazim Vasiliauskas	1:38.002	5
6	15	(Russia) Mikhail Aleshin	1:38.186	6
7	33	(Austria) Philipp Eng	1:38.268	7
8	8	(Germany) Tobias Hegewald	1:38.436	8
9	5	(United Kingdom) Alex Brundle	1:38.548	9
10	16	(Italy) Edoardo Piscopo	1:38.560	10
11	17	(Brazil) Carlos Iaconelli	1:38.717	11
12	11	(United Kingdom) Jack Clarke	1:38.727	12
13	4	(France) Julien Jousse	1:38.819	13
14	23	(Finland) Henri Karjalainen	1:38.819	14
15	27	(Spain) Germán Sánchez	1:38.825	15
16	3	(United Kingdom) Jolyon Palmer	1:38.972	16
17	10	(Italy) Nicola de Marco	1:39.019	17
18	31	(United Kingdom) Jason Moore	1:39.062	18
19	24	(United Kingdom) Tom Gladdis	1:39.372	19
20	2	(Sweden) Sebastian Hohenthal	1:39.447	20
21	20	(Germany) Jens Höing	1:39.496	21
22	44	(United Kingdom) Ollie Hancock	1:39.518	22
23	9	(Italy) Pietro Gandolfi	1:40.588	23
24	6	(India) Armaan Ebrahim	1:40.654	24
25	18	(Switzerland) Natacha Gachnang	1:42.379	25

=== Race 2 ===
Weather/Track: Sun 25°/Dry 43°

Pos	No	Driver	Laps	Time/Retired	Grid	Points
1	22	(Spain) Andy Soucek	15	30:12.572	3	10
2	12	(Canada) Robert Wickens	15	+2.407	1	8
3	25	(Serbia) Miloš Pavlović	15	+7.912	4	6
4	8	(Germany) Tobias Hegewald	15	+16.389	8	5
5	17	(Brazil) Carlos Iaconelli	15	+20.163	11	4
6	3	(United Kingdom) Jolyon Palmer	15	+23.510	16	3
7	31	(United Kingdom) Jason Moore	15	+25.495	18	2
8	27	(Spain) Germán Sánchez	15	+27.214	15	1
9	10	(Italy) Nicola de Marco	15	+27.288	17	
10	33	(Austria) Philipp Eng	15	+28.071	7	
11	44	(United Kingdom) Ollie Hancock	15	+30.220	22	
12	2	(Sweden) Sebastian Hohenthal	15	+33.234	20	
13	24	(United Kingdom) Tom Gladdis	15	+33.872	19	
14	11	(United Kingdom) Jack Clarke	15	+42.134	12	
15	23	(Finland) Henri Karjalainen	15	+43.202	14	
Ret	14	(Italy) Mirko Bortolotti	5	DNF	2	
Ret	21	(Lithuania) Kazim Vasiliauskas	5	DNF	5	
Ret	5	(United Kingdom) Alex Brundle	5	DNF	9	
Ret	4	(France) Julien Jousse	5	DNF	13	
Ret	16	(Italy) Edoardo Piscopo	2	DNF	10	
Ret	18	(Switzerland) Natacha Gachnang	1	DNF	25	
Ret	9	(Italy) Pietro Gandolfi	1	DNF	23	
Ret	6	(India) Armaan Ebrahim	0	DNF	24	
Ret	15	(Russia) Mikhail Aleshin	0	DNF	6	
Ret	20	(Germany) Jens Höing	0	DNF	21	
Fastest lap: Robert Wickens 1:38.576 (179.27 km/h) on lap 12

== Standings after the race ==
Drivers' Championship standings

Pos	Driver	Points
1	(Spain) Andy Soucek	95
2	(Canada) Robert Wickens	58
3	(Russia) Mikhail Aleshin	49
4	(Italy) Mirko Bortolotti	47
5	(France) Julien Jousse	43
