= 2009 Catalunya Formula Two round =

(Spain) 2009 Catalunya Formula Two round
Round details
- Round 8 of 8 in the 2009 FIA Formula Two Championship.
- Location: Circuit de Catalunya, Barcelona, Spain
- Course: Permanent racing facility 4.655 km (2.875 mi)

First race
- Date: 31 October 2009
- Laps: 20
Pole position
- Driver: (Canada) Robert Wickens
- Time: 1:39.020
Podium
- First: (Spain) Andy Soucek
- Second: (Russia) Mikhail Aleshin
- Third: (France) Tristan Vautier
Fastest lap
- Driver: (United Kingdom) Jason Moore
- Time: 1:40.931 (on lap 5)

Second race
- Date: 1 November 2009
- Laps: 20
Pole position
- Driver: (Canada) Robert Wickens
- Time: 1:38.096
Podium
- First: (Spain) Andy Soucek
- Second: (Italy) Nicola de Marco
- Third: (Canada) Robert Wickens
Fastest lap
- Driver: (Spain) Andy Soucek
- Time: 1:39.704 (on lap 2)

The 2009 Catalunya Formula Two round was the eighth and final round of the 2009 FIA Formula Two Championship season. It was held on 31 October and 1 November 2009 at Circuit de Catalunya in Montmeló, just outside Barcelona, Spain. The first race was won by Andy Soucek, with Mikhail Aleshin and debutant Tristan Vautier also on the podium. The second race was also won by Soucek, with Nicola de Marco and Robert Wickens also on the podium. Edoardo Piscopo missed this round to participate in the first round of 2009–10 GP2 Asia Series season in Abu Dhabi. His slot was filled by Formula Palmer Audi driver Vautier. Carlos Iaconelli also missed out on the round, due to flu.

== Classification ==
=== Qualifying 1 ===
| Pos | No | Name | Time | Grid |
|---|---|---|---|---|
| 1 | 12 | (Canada) Robert Wickens | 1:39.020 | 1 |
| 2 | 22 | (Spain) Andy Soucek | 1:39.268 | 2 |
| 3 | 10 | (Italy) Nicola de Marco | 1:39.416 | 3 |
| 4 | 15 | (Russia) Mikhail Aleshin | 1:39.426 | 4 |
| 5 | 38 | (France) Tristan Vautier | 1:39.446 | 5 |
| 6 | 4 | (France) Julien Jousse | 1:39.502 | 6 |
| 7 | 33 | (Austria) Philipp Eng | 1:39.511 | 7 |
| 8 | 14 | (Italy) Mirko Bortolotti | 1:39.654 | 8 |
| 9 | 18 | (Switzerland) Natacha Gachnang | 1:39.660 | 9 |
| 10 | 21 | (Lithuania) Kazim Vasiliauskas | 1:39.707 | 10 |
| 11 | 25 | (Serbia) Miloš Pavlović | 1:39.721 | 11 |
| 12 | 8 | (Germany) Tobias Hegewald | 1:39.847 | 12 |
| 13 | 31 | (United Kingdom) Jason Moore | 1:39.955 | 13 |
| 14 | 3 | (United Kingdom) Jolyon Palmer | 1:40.022 | 14 |
| 15 | 6 | (India) Armaan Ebrahim | 1:40.042 | 15 |
| 16 | 20 | (Germany) Jens Höing | 1:40.396 | 16 |
| 17 | 23 | (Finland) Henri Karjalainen | 1:40.529 | 17 |
| 18 | 24 | (United Kingdom) Tom Gladdis | 1:40.541 | 18 |
| 19 | 27 | (Spain) Germán Sánchez | 1:40.720 | 19 |
| 20 | 2 | (Sweden) Sebastian Hohenthal | 1:40.956 | 20 |
| 21 | 5 | (United Kingdom) Alex Brundle | 1:41.036 | 21 |
| 22 | 44 | (United Kingdom) Ollie Hancock | 1:41.770 | 22 |
| 23 | 9 | (Italy) Pietro Gandolfi | 1:42.361 | 23 |
| 24 | 11 | (United Kingdom) Jack Clarke | no time | 24 |

=== Qualifying 2 ===
| Pos | No | Name | Time | Grid |
|---|---|---|---|---|
| 1 | 12 | (Canada) Robert Wickens | 1:38.096 | 1 |
| 2 | 22 | (Spain) Andy Soucek | 1:38.163 | 2 |
| 3 | 33 | (Austria) Philipp Eng | 1:38.201 | 3 |
| 4 | 10 | (Italy) Nicola de Marco | 1:38.319 | 4 |
| 5 | 8 | (Germany) Tobias Hegewald | 1:38.343 | 5 |
| 6 | 21 | (Lithuania) Kazim Vasiliauskas | 1:38.414 | 6 |
| 7 | 15 | (Russia) Mikhail Aleshin | 1:38.470 | 7 |
| 8 | 38 | (France) Tristan Vautier | 1:38.488 | 8 |
| 9 | 6 | (India) Armaan Ebrahim | 1:38.526 | 9 |
| 10 | 4 | (France) Julien Jousse | 1:38.607 | 10 |
| 11 | 31 | (United Kingdom) Jason Moore | 1:38.624 | 11 |
| 12 | 3 | (United Kingdom) Jolyon Palmer | 1:38.810 | 12 |
| 13 | 14 | (Italy) Mirko Bortolotti | 1:38.840 | 13 |
| 14 | 25 | (Serbia) Miloš Pavlović | 1:38.888 | 14 |
| 15 | 18 | (Switzerland) Natacha Gachnang | 1:38.916 | 15 |
| 16 | 24 | (United Kingdom) Tom Gladdis | 1:39.012 | 16 |
| 17 | 5 | (United Kingdom) Alex Brundle | 1:39.126 | 17 |
| 18 | 11 | (United Kingdom) Jack Clarke | 1:39.310 | 18 |
| 19 | 23 | (Finland) Henri Karjalainen | 1:39.348 | 19 |
| 20 | 2 | (Sweden) Sebastian Hohenthal | 1:39.803 | 20 |
| 21 | 20 | (Germany) Jens Höing | 1:40.322 | 21 |
| 22 | 27 | (Spain) Germán Sánchez | 1:40.464 | 22 |
| 23 | 44 | (United Kingdom) Ollie Hancock | 1:40.544 | 23 |
| 24 | 9 | (Italy) Pietro Gandolfi | 1:41.765 | 24 |

=== Race 1 ===
| Pos | No | Driver | Laps | Time/Retired | Grid | Points |
|---|---|---|---|---|---|---|
| 1 | 22 | (Spain) Andy Soucek | 20 | 33:53.492 | 2 | 10 |
| 2 | 15 | (Russia) Mikhail Aleshin | 20 | +4.389 | 4 | 8 |
| 3 | 38 | (France) Tristan Vautier | 20 | +7.645 | 5 | 6 |
| 4 | 4 | (France) Julien Jousse | 20 | +7.980 | 6 | 5 |
| 5 | 33 | (Austria) Philipp Eng | 20 | +13.329 | 7 | 4 |
| 6 | 14 | (Italy) Mirko Bortolotti | 20 | +13.825 | 8 | 3 |
| 7 | 18 | (Switzerland) Natacha Gachnang | 20 | +16.977 | 9 | 2 |
| 8 | 21 | (Lithuania) Kazim Vasiliauskas | 20 | +17.476 | 10 | 1 |
| 9 | 8 | (Germany) Tobias Hegewald | 20 | +19.251 | 12 | |
| 10 | 25 | (Serbia) Miloš Pavlović | 20 | +24.503 | 11 | |
| 11 | 10 | (Italy) Nicola de Marco | 20 | +26.378 | 3 | |
| 12 | 6 | (India) Armaan Ebrahim | 20 | +27.830 | 15 | |
| 13 | 3 | (United Kingdom) Jolyon Palmer | 20 | +32.587 | 14 | |
| 14 | 24 | (United Kingdom) Tom Gladdis | 20 | +33.010 | 18 | |
| 15 | 5 | (United Kingdom) Alex Brundle | 20 | +37.925 | 21 | |
| 16 | 23 | (Finland) Henri Karjalainen | 20 | +38.232 | 17 | |
| 17 | 11 | (United Kingdom) Jack Clarke | 20 | +42.997 | 24 | |
| 18 | 44 | (United Kingdom) Ollie Hancock | 20 | +47.618 | 22 | |
| 19 | 31 | (United Kingdom) Jason Moore | 20 | +47.901 | 13 | |
| Ret | 2 | (Sweden) Sebastian Hohenthal | 12 | DNF | 20 | |
| Ret | 9 | (Italy) Pietro Gandolfi | 6 | DNF | 23 | |
| Ret | 12 | (Canada) Robert Wickens | 4 | DNF | 1 | |
| Ret | 20 | (Germany) Jens Höing | 0 | DNF | 16 | |
| DNS | 27 | (Spain) Germán Sánchez | 0 | | 19 | |
Fastest lap: Jason Moore 1:40.931 (166.0 km/h) on lap 5

=== Race 2 ===
| Pos | No | Driver | Laps | Time/Retired | Grid | Points |
|---|---|---|---|---|---|---|
| 1 | 22 | (Spain) Andy Soucek | 20 | 33:53.492 | 2 | 10 |
| 2 | 10 | (Italy) Nicola de Marco | 20 | +7.538 | 4 | 8 |
| 3 | 12 | (Canada) Robert Wickens | 20 | +9.645 | 1 | 6 |
| 4 | 21 | (Lithuania) Kazim Vasiliauskas | 20 | +10.197 | 6 | 5 |
| 5 | 8 | (Germany) Tobias Hegewald | 20 | +14.652 | 5 | 4 |
| 6 | 38 | (France) Tristan Vautier | 20 | +19.626 | 8 | 3 |
| 7 | 15 | (Russia) Mikhail Aleshin | 20 | +21.529 | 7 | 2 |
| 8 | 4 | (France) Julien Jousse | 20 | +21.892 | 10 | 1 |
| 9 | 33 | (Austria) Philipp Eng | 20 | +24.201 | 3 | |
| 10 | 6 | (India) Armaan Ebrahim | 20 | +25.618 | 9 | |
| 11 | 3 | (United Kingdom) Jolyon Palmer | 20 | +26.809 | 12 | |
| 12 | 5 | (United Kingdom) Alex Brundle | 20 | +31.384 | 17 | |
| 13 | 18 | (Switzerland) Natacha Gachnang | 20 | +32.857 | 15 | |
| 14 | 11 | (United Kingdom) Jack Clarke | 20 | +38.459 | 18 | |
| 15 | 24 | (United Kingdom) Tom Gladdis | 20 | +39.156 | 16 | |
| 16 | 31 | (United Kingdom) Jason Moore | 20 | +39.615 | 11 | |
| 17 | 23 | (Finland) Henri Karjalainen | 20 | +44.476 | 19 | |
| 18 | 44 | (United Kingdom) Ollie Hancock | 20 | +44.811 | 23 | |
| 19 | 25 | (Serbia) Miloš Pavlović | 20 | +1:09.899 | 14 | |
| 20 | 9 | (Italy) Pietro Gandolfi | 20 | +1:16.682 | 24 | |
| 21 | 20 | (Germany) Jens Höing | 18 | +2 laps | 21 | |
| Ret | 2 | (Sweden) Sebastian Hohenthal | 10 | DNF | 20 | |
| Ret | 14 | (Italy) Mirko Bortolotti | 8 | DNF | 13 | |
| DNS | 27 | (Spain) Germán Sánchez | 0 | | 22 | |
Fastest lap: Andy Soucek 1:39.704 (168.1 km/h) on lap 2

== Standings after the race ==
Drivers' Championship standings

| Pos | Driver | Points |
|---|---|---|
| 1 | (Spain) Andy Soucek | 115 |
| 2 | (Canada) Robert Wickens | 64 |
| 3 | (Russia) Mikhail Aleshin | 59 |
| 4 | (Italy) Mirko Bortolotti | 50 |
| 5 | (France) Julien Jousse | 49 |
