= 2009 Donington Formula Two round =

(United Kingdom) 2009 Donington Formula Two round
Round details
- Round 5 of 8 in the 2009 FIA Formula Two Championship.
- Location: Donington Park, North West Leicestershire, England
- Course: Permanent racing facility 4.023 km (2.500 mi)

First race
- Date: 16 August 2009
- Laps: 25
Pole position
- Driver: (Germany) Tobias Hegewald
- Time: 1:23.116
Podium
- First: (Spain) Andy Soucek
- Second: (Russia) Mikhail Aleshin
- Third: (Germany) Tobias Hegewald
Fastest lap
- Driver: (France) Julien Jousse
- Time: 1:24.293 (on lap 18)

Second race
- Date: 16 August 2009
- Laps: 25
Pole position
- Driver: (France) Julien Jousse
- Time: 1:23.507
Podium
- First: (France) Julien Jousse
- Second: (Lithuania) Kazim Vasiliauskas
- Third: (Italy) Mirko Bortolotti
Fastest lap
- Driver: (France) Julien Jousse
- Time: 1:24.135 (on lap 22)

The 2009 Donington Formula Two round was the fifth round of the 2009 FIA Formula Two Championship season. It was held on 16 August 2009 at Donington Park in North West Leicestershire, United Kingdom. The first race was won by Andy Soucek, with Mikhail Aleshin and Tobias Hegewald also on the podium. The second race was won by Julien Jousse, with Kazim Vasiliauskas and Mirko Bortolotti also on the podium. Only 24 cars competed at the event, after Henry Surtees' fatal accident at Brands Hatch left a vacant slot that was unfilled.

== Classification ==
=== Qualifying 1 ===
Pos	No	Name	Time	Grid
1	8	(Germany) Tobias Hegewald	1:23.116	1
2	15	(Russia) Mikhail Aleshin	1:23.429	2
3	22	(Spain) Andy Soucek	1:23.437	3
4	4	(France) Julien Jousse	1:23.460	4
5	25	(Serbia) Miloš Pavlović	1:23.542	5
6	16	(Italy) Edoardo Piscopo	1:23.623	6
7	21	(Lithuania) Kazim Vasiliauskas	1:23.699	7
8	2	(Sweden) Sebastian Hohenthal	1:23.702	8
9	12	(Canada) Robert Wickens	1:23.828	9
10	33	(Austria) Philipp Eng	1:23.939	10
11	14	(Italy) Mirko Bortolotti	1:24.029	11
12	6	(India) Armaan Ebrahim	1:24.244	12
13	11	(United Kingdom) Jack Clarke	1:24.275	13
14	31	(United Kingdom) Jason Moore	1:24.339	14
15	27	(Spain) Germán Sánchez	1:24.368	15
16	3	(United Kingdom) Jolyon Palmer	1:24.391	16
17	15	(Brazil) Carlos Iaconelli	1:24.413	17
18	5	(United Kingdom) Alex Brundle	1:24.435	18
19	18	(Switzerland) Natacha Gachnang	1:24.472	19
20	24	(United Kingdom) Tom Gladdis	1:24.515	20
21	10	(Italy) Nicola de Marco	1:24.674	21
22	23	(Finland) Henri Karjalainen	1:24.720	22
23	9	(Italy) Pietro Gandolfi	1:26.888	23
24	20	(Germany) Jens Höing	1:38.770	24

=== Qualifying 2 ===
Pos	No	Name	Time	Grid
1	4	(France) Julien Jousse	1:23.507	1
2	2	(Sweden) Sebastian Hohenthal	1:23.635	2
3	14	(Italy) Mirko Bortolotti	1:23.681	3
4	21	(Lithuania) Kazim Vasiliauskas	1:23.709	4
5	16	(Italy) Edoardo Piscopo	1:23.714	5
6	22	(Spain) Andy Soucek	1:23.763	6
7	15	(Russia) Mikhail Aleshin	1:23.847	7
8	12	(Canada) Robert Wickens	1:23.884	8
9	8	(Germany) Tobias Hegewald	1:23.943	9
10	33	(Austria) Philipp Eng	1:24.003	10
11	25	(Serbia) Miloš Pavlović	1:24.044	11
12	15	(Brazil) Carlos Iaconelli	1:24.098	12
13	27	(Spain) Germán Sánchez	1:24.198	13
14	6	(India) Armaan Ebrahim	1:24.249	14
15	31	(United Kingdom) Jason Moore	1:24.354	15
16	24	(United Kingdom) Tom Gladdis	1:24.446	16
17	3	(United Kingdom) Jolyon Palmer	1:24.472	17
18	23	(Finland) Henri Karjalainen	1:24.493	18
19	10	(Italy) Nicola de Marco	1:24.680	19
20	11	(United Kingdom) Jack Clarke	1:24.718	20
21	5	(United Kingdom) Alex Brundle	1:24.739	21
22	18	(Switzerland) Natacha Gachnang	1:25.046	22
23	20	(Germany) Jens Höing	1:25.894	23
24	9	(Italy) Pietro Gandolfi	1:26.951	24

=== Race 1 ===
Weather/Track: Cloud /Dry

Pos	No	Driver	Laps	Time/Retired	Grid	Points
1	22	(Spain) Andy Soucek	25	35:26.366	3	10
2	15	(Russia) Mikhail Aleshin	25	+9.799	2	8
3	8	(Germany) Tobias Hegewald	25	+11.976	1	6
4	16	(Italy) Edoardo Piscopo	25	+12.848	6	5
5	33	(Austria) Philipp Eng	25	+14.056	10	4
6	2	(Sweden) Sebastian Hohenthal	25	+15.760	8	3
7	4	(France) Julien Jousse	25	+16.289	4	2
8	6	(India) Armaan Ebrahim	25	+29.596	12	1
9	11	(United Kingdom) Jack Clarke	25	+39.739	13	
10	14	(Italy) Mirko Bortolotti	25	+41.514	11	
11	31	(United Kingdom) Jason Moore	25	+51.357	14	
12	27	(Spain) Germán Sánchez	25	+55.939	15	
13	18	(Switzerland) Natacha Gachnang	25	+1:00.663	19	
14	5	(United Kingdom) Alex Brundle	25	+1:26.951	18	
15	23	(Finland) Henri Karjalainen	24	+1 lap	22	
16	3	(United Kingdom) Jolyon Palmer	24	+1 lap	16	
17	24	(United Kingdom) Tom Gladdis	23	+2 laps	20	
Ret	25	(Serbia) Miloš Pavlović	21	DNF	5	
Ret	17	(Brazil) Carlos Iaconelli	17	DNF	17	
Ret	9	(Italy) Pietro Gandolfi	15	DNF	23	
Ret	12	(Canada) Robert Wickens	14	DNF	9	
Ret	20	(Germany) Jens Höing	1	DNF	24	
Ret	10	(Italy) Nicola de Marco	1	DNF	21	
Ret	21	(Lithuania) Kazim Vasiliauskas	0	DNF	7	
Fastest lap: Julien Jousse 1:24.293 (171.81 km/h) on lap 18

=== Race 2 ===
Weather/Track: Bright/Dry

Pos	No	Driver	Laps	Time/Retired	Grid	Points
1	4	(France) Julien Jousse	25	38:28.770	1	10
2	21	(Lithuania) Kazim Vasiliauskas	25	+15.116	4	8
3	14	(Italy) Mirko Bortolotti	25	+17.858	3	6
4	22	(Spain) Andy Soucek	25	+18.318	6	5
5	2	(Sweden) Sebastian Hohenthal	25	+19.315	2	4
6	8	(Germany) Tobias Hegewald	25	+19.948	9	3
7	15	(Russia) Mikhail Aleshin	25	+20.383	7	2
8	25	(Serbia) Miloš Pavlović	25	+21.440	11	1
9	17	(Brazil) Carlos Iaconelli	25	+23.886	12	
10	33	(Austria) Philipp Eng	25	+24.301	10	
11	27	(Spain) Germán Sánchez	25	+32.270	13	
12	3	(United Kingdom) Jolyon Palmer	25	+33.001	17	
13	23	(Finland) Henri Karjalainen	25	+33.729	18	
14	11	(United Kingdom) Jack Clarke	25	+37.285	20	
15	9	(Italy) Pietro Gandolfi	25	+1:04.475	24	
Ret	18	(Switzerland) Natacha Gachnang	19	DNF	22	
Ret	16	(Italy) Edoardo Piscopo	12	DNF	5	
Ret	5	(United Kingdom) Alex Brundle	5	DNF	21	
Ret	12	(Canada) Robert Wickens	5	DNF	8	
Ret	31	(United Kingdom) Jason Moore	1	DNF	15	
Ret	24	(United Kingdom) Tom Gladdis	1	DNF	16	
Ret	6	(India) Armaan Ebrahim	0	DNF	14	
Ret	10	(Italy) Nicola de Marco	0	DNF	19	
Ret	20	(Germany) Jens Höing	0	DNF	23	
Fastest lap: Julien Jousse 1:24.135 (172.13 km/h) on lap 22

== Standings after the race ==
Drivers' Championship standings

Pos	Driver	Points
1	(Spain) Andy Soucek	61
2	(Canada) Robert Wickens	39
3	(France) Julien Jousse	37
4	(Germany) Tobias Hegewald	34
5	(Russia) Mikhail Aleshin	33
