= 2009 Spa Formula Two round =

(Belgium) 2009 Spa Formula Two round
Round details
- Round 3 of 8 in the 2009 FIA Formula Two Championship.
- Location: Circuit de Spa-Francorchamps, Spa, Belgium
- Course: Permanent racing facility 7.004 km (4.352 mi)

First race
- Date: 27 June 2009
- Laps: 11
Pole position
- Driver: (Germany) Tobias Hegewald
- Time: 2:08.890
Podium
- First: (Germany) Tobias Hegewald
- Second: (Serbia) Miloš Pavlović
- Third: (France) Julien Jousse
Fastest lap
- Driver: (Germany) Tobias Hegewald
- Time: 2:09.812 (on lap 4)

Second race
- Date: 28 June 2009
- Laps: 15
Pole position
- Driver: (Germany) Tobias Hegewald
- Time: 2:08.233
Podium
- First: (Germany) Tobias Hegewald
- Second: (Spain) Andy Soucek
- Third: (Canada) Robert Wickens
Fastest lap
- Driver: (Germany) Tobias Hegewald
- Time: 2:11.012 (on lap 2)

The 2009 Spa Formula Two round was the third round of the 2009 FIA Formula Two Championship season. It was held on 27 and 28 June 2009 at Circuit de Spa-Francorchamps at Spa, Belgium. The weekend was dominated by Tobias Hegewald, who took two poles, won both races and got fastest lap for both races.

== Classification ==
=== Qualifying 1 ===
Pos	No	Name	Time	Grid
1	8	(Germany) Tobias Hegewald	2:08.890	1
2	22	(Spain) Andy Soucek	2:08.981	2
3	12	(Canada) Robert Wickens	2:09.265	3
4	4	(France) Julien Jousse	2:09.458	4
5	21	(Lithuania) Kazim Vasiliauskas	2:09.813	5
6	7	(United Kingdom) Henry Surtees	2:10.325	6
7	25	(Serbia) Miloš Pavlović	2:10.419	7
8	5	(United Kingdom) Alex Brundle	2:10.487	8
9	3	(United Kingdom) Jolyon Palmer	2:10.521	9
10	33	(Austria) Philipp Eng	2:10.754	10
11	15	(Brazil) Carlos Iaconelli	2:10.854	11
12	11	(United Kingdom) Jack Clarke	2:11.119	12
13	23	(Finland) Henri Karjalainen	2:11.135	13
14	27	(Spain) Germán Sánchez	2:11.137	14
15	24	(United Kingdom) Tom Gladdis	2:11.362	15
16	6	(India) Armaan Ebrahim	2:11.485	16
17	31	(United Kingdom) Jason Moore	2:11.908	17
18	20	(Germany) Jens Höing	2:12.010	18
19	16	(Italy) Edoardo Piscopo	2:12.130	19
20	18	(Switzerland) Natacha Gachnang	2:12.193	20
21	2	(Sweden) Sebastian Hohenthal	2:12.369	21
22	14	(Italy) Mirko Bortolotti	2:12.836	22
23	9	(Italy) Pietro Gandolfi	2:13.804	23
24	10	(Italy) Nicola de Marco	no time	24
25	15	(Russia) Mikhail Aleshin	no time	25

=== Qualifying 2 ===
Pos	No	Name	Time	Grid
1	8	(Germany) Tobias Hegewald	2:08.233	1
2	12	(Canada) Robert Wickens	2:08.393	2
3	22	(Spain) Andy Soucek	2:08.432	3
4	5	(United Kingdom) Alex Brundle	2:08.507	4
5	4	(France) Julien Jousse	2:08.864	5
6	25	(Serbia) Miloš Pavlović	2:08.887	6
7	15	(Russia) Mikhail Aleshin	2:09.135	7
8	14	(Italy) Mirko Bortolotti	2:09.746	8
9	21	(Lithuania) Kazim Vasiliauskas	2:09.866	9
10	33	(Austria) Philipp Eng	2:09.921	10
11	15	(Brazil) Carlos Iaconelli	2:10.004	11
12	3	(United Kingdom) Jolyon Palmer	2:10.385	12
13	11	(United Kingdom) Jack Clarke	2:10.397	13
14	23	(Finland) Henri Karjalainen	2:10.529	14
15	24	(United Kingdom) Tom Gladdis	2:10.582	15
16	20	(Germany) Jens Höing	2:10.600	16
17	27	(Spain) Germán Sánchez	2:10.753	17
18	2	(Sweden) Sebastian Hohenthal	2:11.188	18
19	31	(United Kingdom) Jason Moore	2:11.196	19
20	18	(Switzerland) Natacha Gachnang	2:11.387	20
21	10	(Italy) Nicola de Marco	2:12.180	21
22	9	(Italy) Pietro Gandolfi	2:12.972	22
23	7	(United Kingdom) Henry Surtees	2:13.951	23
24	6	(India) Armaan Ebrahim	2:15.285	24
25	16	(Italy) Edoardo Piscopo	no time	25

=== Race 1 ===
Pos	No	Driver	Laps	Time/Retired	Grid	Points
1	8	(Germany) Tobias Hegewald	11	25:59.481	1	10
2	25	(Serbia) Miloš Pavlović	11	+7.896	7	8
3	4	(France) Julien Jousse	11	+8.619	4	6
4	22	(Spain) Andy Soucek	11	+14.149	2	5
5	11	(United Kingdom) Jack Clarke	11	+19.406	12	4
6	24	(United Kingdom) Tom Gladdis	11	+19.955	15	3
7	23	(Finland) Henri Karjalainen	11	+21.720	13	2
8	16	(Italy) Edoardo Piscopo	11	+27.003	19	1
9	14	(Italy) Mirko Bortolotti	11	+34.193	22	
10	21	(Lithuania) Kazim Vasiliauskas	11	+36.390	5	
11	18	(Switzerland) Natacha Gachnang	11	+43.088	20	
12	27	(Spain) Germán Sánchez	11	+43.641	14	
13	10	(Italy) Nicola de Marco	11	+44.839	24	
14	9	(Italy) Pietro Gandolfi	11	+1:04.711	23	
15	7	(United Kingdom) Henry Surtees	11	+1:11.026	6	
16	3	(United Kingdom) Jolyon Palmer	11	+2:01.189	9	
17	2	(Sweden) Sebastian Hohenthal	10	+1 lap/DNF	21	
18	15	(Russia) Mikhail Aleshin	10	+1 lap/DNF	25	
Ret	33	(Austria) Philipp Eng	4	DNF	10	
Ret	5	(United Kingdom) Alex Brundle	2	DNF	8	
Ret	17	(Brazil) Carlos Iaconelli	1	DNF	11	
Ret	12	(Canada) Robert Wickens	0	DNF	3	
Ret	20	(Germany) Jens Höing	0	DNF	18	
Ret	31	(United Kingdom) Jason Moore	0	DNF	17	
DNS	6	(India) Armaan Ebrahim	0		16	
Fastest lap: Tobias Hegewald 2:09.812 (194.2 km/h) on lap 4

=== Race 2 ===
Pos	No	Driver	Laps	Time/Retired	Grid	Points
1	8	(Germany) Tobias Hegewald	15	33:04.856	1	10
2	22	(Spain) Andy Soucek	15	+6.855	3	8
3	12	(Canada) Robert Wickens	15	+8.878	2	6
4	25	(Serbia) Miloš Pavlović	15	+14.977	6	5
5	5	(United Kingdom) Alex Brundle	15	+17.638	4	4
6	4	(France) Julien Jousse	15	+18.158	5	3
7	21	(Lithuania) Kazim Vasiliauskas	15	+19.601	9	2
8	15	(Russia) Mikhail Aleshin	15	+20.451	7	1
9	14	(Italy) Mirko Bortolotti	15	+21.111	8	
10	17	(Brazil) Carlos Iaconelli	15	+27.803	11	
11	10	(Italy) Nicola de Marco	15	+29.911	21	
12	2	(Sweden) Sebastian Hohenthal	15	+37.199	18	
13	18	(Switzerland) Natacha Gachnang	15	+43.046	20	
14	16	(Italy) Edoardo Piscopo	15	+43.546	25	
15	23	(Finland) Henri Karjalainen	15	+44.082	14	
16	20	(Germany) Jens Höing	15	+50.628	16	
17	9	(Italy) Pietro Gandolfi	15	+1:04.634	22	
Ret	27	(Spain) Germán Sánchez	11	DNF	17	
Ret	33	(Austria) Philipp Eng	8	DNF	10	
Ret	7	(United Kingdom) Henry Surtees	4	DNF	23	
Ret	6	(India) Armaan Ebrahim	4	DNF	24	
Ret	24	(United Kingdom) Tom Gladdis	1	DNF	15	
Ret	3	(United Kingdom) Jolyon Palmer	0	DNF	12	
Ret	11	(United Kingdom) Jack Clarke	0	DNF	13	
DNS	31	(United Kingdom) Jason Moore	0	DNF	19	
Fastest lap: Tobias Hegewald 2:11.012 (192.4 km/h) on lap 2

== Standings after the race ==
Drivers' Championship standings

Pos	Driver	Points
1	(Spain) Andy Soucek	28
2	(Canada) Robert Wickens	26
3	(France) Julien Jousse	25
4	(Germany) Tobias Hegewald	22
5	(Italy) Mirko Bortolotti	21
