= 2009 Brno Formula Two round =

(Czech Republic) 2009 Brno Formula Two round
Round details
- Round 2 of 8 in the 2009 FIA Formula Two Championship.
- Location: Masaryk Circuit, Brno, Czech Republic
- Course: Permanent racing facility 5.403 km (3.357 mi)

First race
- Date: 20 June 2009
- Laps: 22
Pole position
- Driver: (Italy) Nicola de Marco
- Time: 2:03.484
Podium
- First: (Italy) Mirko Bortolotti
- Second: (Russia) Mikhail Aleshin
- Third: (Austria) Philipp Eng
Fastest lap
- Driver: (Canada) Robert Wickens
- Time: 1:49.747 (on lap 22)

Second race
- Date: 21 June 2009
- Laps: 14
Pole position
- Driver: (United Kingdom) Henry Surtees
- Time: 1:48.006
Podium
- First: (Spain) Andy Soucek
- Second: (France) Julien Jousse
- Third: (Italy) Nicola de Marco
Fastest lap
- Driver: (Italy) Nicola de Marco
- Time: 1:50.011 (on lap 10)

The 2009 Brno Formula Two round was the second round of the 2009 FIA Formula Two Championship season. It was held on 20 and 21 June 2009 at Masaryk Circuit at Brno, Czech Republic. The first race was won by Mirko Bortolotti, with Mikhail Aleshin and Philipp Eng also on the podium. The second race was won by Andy Soucek, with Julien Jousse and Nicola de Marco also on the podium.

== Classification ==
=== Qualifying 1 ===
Weather/Track: Cloud 18°/Wet 20°

Pos	No	Name	Time	Grid
1	10	(Italy) Nicola de Marco	2:03.484	1
2	14	(Italy) Mirko Bortolotti	2:03.651	2
3	23	(Finland) Henri Karjalainen	2:03.667	3
4	33	(Austria) Philipp Eng	2:03.855	4
5	15	(Russia) Mikhail Aleshin	2:03.892	5
6	16	(Italy) Edoardo Piscopo	2:04.251	6
7	15	(Brazil) Carlos Iaconelli	2:04.367	7
8	8	(Germany) Tobias Hegewald	2:04.389	8
9	22	(Spain) Andy Soucek	2:04.720	9
10	12	(Canada) Robert Wickens	2:05.109	10
11	4	(France) Julien Jousse	2:05.264	11
12	25	(Serbia) Miloš Pavlović	2:05.431	12
13	24	(United Kingdom) Tom Gladdis	2:05.468	13
14	21	(Lithuania) Kazim Vasiliauskas	2:05.722	14
15	7	(United Kingdom) Henry Surtees	2:05.835	15
16	3	(United Kingdom) Jolyon Palmer	2:06.048	16
17	11	(United Kingdom) Jack Clarke	2:06.110	17
18	2	(Sweden) Sebastian Hohenthal	2:06.597	18
19	6	(India) Armaan Ebrahim	2:08.272	19
20	27	(Spain) Germán Sánchez	2:08.495	20
21	9	(Italy) Pietro Gandolfi	2:09.253	21
22	31	(United Kingdom) Jason Moore	2:09.709	22
23	5	(United Kingdom) Alex Brundle	2:09.763	23
24	20	(Germany) Jens Höing	2:13.190	24
25	18	(Switzerland) Natacha Gachnang	2:13.784	25

=== Race 1 ===
Weather: Sun 28°; Track: Dry 49°

Pos	No	Driver	Laps	Time/Retired	Grid	Points
1	14	(Italy) Mirko Bortolotti	22	42:23.103	2	10
2	15	(Russia) Mikhail Aleshin	22	+4.675	4	8
3	33	(Austria) Philipp Eng	22	+12.330	5	6
4	23	(Finland) Henri Karjalainen	22	+12.613	3	5
5	4	(France) Julien Jousse	22	+17.391	11	4
6	6	(India) Armaan Ebrahim	22	+26.071	19	3
7	16	(Italy) Edoardo Piscopo	22	+26.355	6	2
8	24	(United Kingdom) Tom Gladdis	22	+34.055	13	1
9	12	(Canada) Robert Wickens	22	+35.109	10	
10	3	(United Kingdom) Jolyon Palmer	22	+39.883	16	
11	5	(United Kingdom) Alex Brundle	22	+40.332	23	
12	10	(Italy) Nicola de Marco	22	+41.372	1	
13	31	(United Kingdom) Jason Moore	22	+43.459	22	
14	18	(Switzerland) Natacha Gachnang	22	+49.167	25	
15	8	(Germany) Tobias Hegewald	22	+58.522	8	
16	27	(Spain) Germán Sánchez	21	+1 lap	20	
17	22	(Spain) Andy Soucek	21	+1 lap	9	
Ret	17	(Brazil) Carlos Iaconelli	14	DNF	7	
Ret	20	(Germany) Jens Höing	11	DNF	24	
Ret	25	(Serbia) Miloš Pavlović	9	DNF	12	
Ret	21	(Lithuania) Kazim Vasiliauskas	5	DNF	14	
Ret	9	(Italy) Pietro Gandolfi	2	DNF	21	
Ret	2	(Sweden) Sebastian Hohenthal	0	DNF	18	
Ret	7	(United Kingdom) Henry Surtees	0	DNF	15	
Ret	11	(United Kingdom) Jack Clarke	0	DNF	17	
Fastest lap: Robert Wickens 1:49.747 (177.23 km/h) on lap 22

=== Qualifying 2 ===
Weather/Track: Sun 14°/Dry 25°

Pos	No	Name	Time	Grid
1	7	(United Kingdom) Henry Surtees	1:48.006	1
2	15	(Russia) Mikhail Aleshin	1:48.151	2
3	14	(Italy) Mirko Bortolotti	1:48.168	3
4	10	(Italy) Nicola de Marco	1:48.170	4
5	4	(France) Julien Jousse	1:48.286	5
6	22	(Spain) Andy Soucek	1:48.332	6
7	25	(Serbia) Miloš Pavlović	1:48.392	7
8	16	(Italy) Edoardo Piscopo	1:48.501	8
9	12	(Canada) Robert Wickens	1:48.506	9
10	23	(Finland) Henri Karjalainen	1:48.622	10
11	15	(Brazil) Carlos Iaconelli	1:48.644	11
12	8	(Germany) Tobias Hegewald	1:48.717	12
13	33	(Austria) Philipp Eng	1:48.778	13
14	24	(United Kingdom) Tom Gladdis	1:48.838	14
15	5	(United Kingdom) Alex Brundle	1:48.896	15
16	27	(Spain) Germán Sánchez	1:48.909	16
17	6	(India) Armaan Ebrahim	1:48.959	17
18	21	(Lithuania) Kazim Vasiliauskas	1:49.229	18
19	2	(Sweden) Sebastian Hohenthal	1:49.907	19
20	11	(United Kingdom) Jack Clarke	1:50.099	20
21	18	(Switzerland) Natacha Gachnang	1:50.237	21
22	3	(United Kingdom) Jolyon Palmer	1:50.265	22
23	20	(Germany) Jens Höing	1:50.870	23
24	9	(Italy) Pietro Gandolfi	1:50.912	24
25	31	(United Kingdom) Jason Moore	1:51.189	25

=== Race 2 ===
Weather: Cloud 26 °C; Track: Dry 29 °C

Pos	No	Driver	Laps	Time/Retired	Grid	Points
1	22	(Spain) Andy Soucek	14	30:43.788	6	10
2	4	(France) Julien Jousse	14	+2.165	5	8
3	10	(Italy) Nicola de Marco	14	+7.075	4	6
4	16	(Italy) Edoardo Piscopo	14	+10.044	8	5
5	25	(Serbia) Miloš Pavlović	14	+11.498	7	4
6	6	(India) Armaan Ebrahim	14	+14.426	17	3
7	8	(Germany) Tobias Hegewald	14	+18.198	12	2
8	21	(Lithuania) Kazim Vasiliauskas	14	+18.684	18	1
9	33	(Austria) Philipp Eng	14	+19.477	13	
10	24	(United Kingdom) Tom Gladdis	14	+20.725	14	
11	31	(United Kingdom) Jason Moore	14	+26.764	25	
12	2	(Sweden) Sebastian Hohenthal	14	+28.067	19	
13	20	(Germany) Jens Höing	14	+38.498	23	
14	3	(United Kingdom) Jolyon Palmer	14	+56.838	22	
15	11	(United Kingdom) Jack Clarke	14	+58.400	20	
16	23	(Finland) Henri Karjalainen	14	+1 lap	10	
Ret	18	(Switzerland) Natacha Gachnang	10	DNF	21	
Ret	14	(Italy) Mirko Bortolotti	6	DNF	3	
Ret	12	(Canada) Robert Wickens	2	DNF	9	
Ret	7	(United Kingdom) Henry Surtees	0	DNF	1	
Ret	15	(Russia) Mikhail Aleshin	0	DNF	2	
Ret	17	(Brazil) Carlos Iaconelli	0	DNF	11	
Ret	5	(United Kingdom) Alex Brundle	0	DNF	15	
Ret	27	(Spain) Germán Sánchez	0	DNF	16	
Ret	9	(Italy) Pietro Gandolfi	0	DNF	24	
Fastest lap: Nicola de Marco 1:50.011 (176.80 km/h) on lap 10

== Standings after the race ==
Drivers' Championship standings

Pos	Driver	Points
1	(Italy) Mirko Bortolotti	21
2	(Canada) Robert Wickens	20
3	(Russia) Mikhail Aleshin	16
4	(France) Julien Jousse	16
5	(Spain) Andy Soucek	15
