= 2009 Valencia Formula Two round =

(Spain) 2009 Valencia Formula Two round
Round details
- Round 1 of 8 in the 2009 FIA Formula Two Championship.
- Location: Circuit Ricardo Tormo, Valencia, Spain
- Course: Permanent racing facility 4.051 km (2.517 mi)

First race
- Date: 30 May 2009
- Laps: 23
Pole position
- Driver: (Canada) Robert Wickens
- Time: 1:27.775
Podium
- First: (Canada) Robert Wickens
- Second: (Brazil) Carlos Iaconelli
- Third: (Lithuania) Kazim Vasiliauskas
Fastest lap
- Driver: (Canada) Robert Wickens
- Time: 1:29.166 (on lap 2)

Second race
- Date: 31 May 2009
- Laps: 17
Pole position
- Driver: (Canada) Robert Wickens
- Time: 1:27.488
Podium
- First: (Canada) Robert Wickens
- Second: (Italy) Mirko Bortolotti
- Third: (Austria) Philipp Eng
Fastest lap
- Driver: (Lithuania) Kazim Vasiliauskas
- Time: 1:28.322 (on lap 4)

The 2009 Valencia Formula Two round was the first round of the 2009 FIA Formula Two Championship season. It was held on 30 and 31 May 2009 at Circuit de Valencia at Valencia, Spain. The first race was won by Robert Wickens, with Carlos Iaconelli and Kazim Vasiliauskas also on the podium. The second race was again won by Robert Wickens, with Mirko Bortolotti and Philipp Eng also on the podium.

== Classification ==
=== Qualifying 1 ===
Weather/Track: Sun 25°/Dry 35°

Pos	No	Name	Time	Grid
1	12	(Canada) Robert Wickens	1:27.775	1
2	8	(Germany) Tobias Hegewald	1:27.789	2
3	22	(Spain) Andy Soucek	1:27.953	3
4	15	(Brazil) Carlos Iaconelli	1:27.955	4
5	15	(Russia) Mikhail Aleshin	1:28.113	5
6	4	(France) Julien Jousse	1:28.113	6
7	16	(Italy) Edoardo Piscopo	1:28.130	7
8	25	(Serbia) Miloš Pavlović	1:28.243	8
9	21	(Lithuania) Kazim Vasiliauskas	1:28.315	9
10	7	(United Kingdom) Henry Surtees	1:28.390	10
11	33	(Austria) Philipp Eng	1:28.461	11
12	14	(Italy) Mirko Bortolotti	1:28.470	12
13	3	(United Kingdom) Jolyon Palmer	1:28.640	13
14	18	(Switzerland) Natacha Gachnang	1:28.729	14
15	2	(Sweden) Sebastian Hohenthal	1:28.755	15
16	5	(United Kingdom) Alex Brundle	1:29.123	16
17	11	(United Kingdom) Jack Clarke	1:29.151	17
18	10	(Italy) Nicola de Marco	1:29.184	18
19	27	(Spain) Germán Sánchez	1:29.240	19
20	6	(India) Armaan Ebrahim	1:29.343	20
21	23	(Finland) Henri Karjalainen	1:29.422	21
22	20	(Germany) Jens Höing	1:29.519	22
23	24	(United Kingdom) Tom Gladdis	1:30.145	23
24	9	(Italy) Pietro Gandolfi	1:30.743	24
25	31	(United Kingdom) Jason Moore	1:31.661	25

=== Qualifying 2 ===
Weather: Sun 23°; Track: Dry 38°

Pos	No	Name	Time	Grid
1	12	(Canada) Robert Wickens	1:27.488	1
2	22	(Spain) Andy Soucek	1:27.613	2
3	14	(Italy) Mirko Bortolotti	1:27.672	3
4	10	(Italy) Nicola de Marco	1:27.679	4
5	33	(Austria) Philipp Eng	1:27.741	5
6	15	(Russia) Mikhail Aleshin	1:27.772	6
7	15	(Brazil) Carlos Iaconelli	1:27.848	7
8	21	(Lithuania) Kazim Vasiliauskas	1:27.869	8
9	4	(France) Julien Jousse	1:27.872	9
10	7	(United Kingdom) Henry Surtees	1:27.880	10
11	16	(Italy) Edoardo Piscopo	1:27.963	11
12	8	(Germany) Tobias Hegewald	1:28.100	12
13	2	(Sweden) Sebastian Hohenthal	1:28.243	13
14	18	(Switzerland) Natacha Gachnang	1:28.253	14
15	27	(Spain) Germán Sánchez	1:28.303	15
16	24	(United Kingdom) Tom Gladdis	1:28.360	16
17	5	(United Kingdom) Alex Brundle	1:28.654	17
18	11	(United Kingdom) Jack Clarke	1:28.716	18
19	23	(Finland) Henri Karjalainen	1:28.811	19
20	6	(India) Armaan Ebrahim	1:28.821	20
21	31	(United Kingdom) Jason Moore	1:28.878	21
22	20	(Germany) Jens Höing	1:29.332	22
23	3	(United Kingdom) Jolyon Palmer	1:29.355	23
24	9	(Italy) Pietro Gandolfi	1:30.245	24
25	25	(Serbia) Miloš Pavlović	1:34.958	25

=== Race 1 ===
Weather: Sun 28°; Track: Dry 49°

Pos	No	Driver	Laps	Time/Retired	Grid	Points
1	12	(Canada) Robert Wickens	23	37:03.621	1	10
2	17	(Brazil) Carlos Iaconelli	23	+3.870	4	8
3	21	(Lithuania) Kazim Vasiliauskas	23	+5.241	9	6
4	15	(Russia) Mikhail Aleshin	23	+8.554	5	5
5	4	(France) Julien Jousse	23	+9.922	6	4
6	14	(Italy) Mirko Bortolotti	23	+10.904	12	3
7	7	(United Kingdom) Henry Surtees	23	+11.319	10	2
8	5	(United Kingdom) Alex Brundle	23	+12.326	16	1
9	10	(Italy) Nicola de Marco	23	+12.913	18	
10	2	(Sweden) Sebastian Hohenthal	23	+13.976	15	
11	18	(Switzerland) Natacha Gachnang	23	+14.982	14	
12	33	(Austria) Philipp Eng	23	+17.675	11	
13	11	(United Kingdom) Jack Clarke	23	+17.916	17	
14	27	(Spain) Germán Sánchez	23	+17.994	19	
15	6	(India) Armaan Ebrahim	23	+18.924	20	
16	31	(United Kingdom) Jason Moore	23	+20.724	25	
17	23	(Finland) Henri Karjalainen	23	+22.076	21	
18	20	(Germany) Jens Höing	23	+25.218	22	
19	24	(United Kingdom) Tom Gladdis	23	+27.296	23	
20	9	(Italy) Pietro Gandolfi	23	+37.711	24	
21	3	(United Kingdom) Jolyon Palmer	23	+48.195	13	
Ret	22	(Spain) Andy Soucek	14	DNF	3	
Ret	8	(Germany) Tobias Hegewald	14	DNF	2	
Ret	25	(Serbia) Miloš Pavlović	4	DNF	8	
Ret	16	(Italy) Edoardo Piscopo	3	DNF	7	
Fastest lap: Robert Wickens 1:29.166 (161.69 km/h) on lap 2

=== Race 2 ===
Weather: Cloud 26 °C; Track: Dry 29 °C

Pos	No	Driver	Laps	Time/Retired	Grid	Points
1	12	(Canada) Robert Wickens	17	25:22.024	1	10
2	14	(Italy) Mirko Bortolotti	17	+5.911	3	8
3	33	(Austria) Philipp Eng	17	+7.881	5	6
4	22	(Spain) Andy Soucek	17	+8.615	2	5
5	10	(Italy) Nicola de Marco	17	+9.780	4	4
6	15	(Russia) Mikhail Aleshin	17	+11.707	6	3
7	16	(Italy) Edoardo Piscopo	17	+13.601	11	2
8	17	(Brazil) Carlos Iaconelli	17	+16.616	7	1
9	8	(Germany) Tobias Hegewald	17	+18.826	12	
10	4	(France) Julien Jousse	17	+21.577	9	
11	27	(Spain) Germán Sánchez	17	+22.968	15	
12	7	(United Kingdom) Henry Surtees	17	+23.520	10	
13	2	(Sweden) Sebastian Hohenthal	17	+27.911	13	
14	31	(United Kingdom) Jason Moore	17	+30.365	21	
15	23	(Finland) Henri Karjalainen	17	+31.059	19	
16	6	(India) Armaan Ebrahim	17	+31.966	20	
17	25	(Serbia) Miloš Pavlović	17	+32.704	25	
18	24	(United Kingdom) Tom Gladdis	17	+36.317	16	
19	11	(United Kingdom) Jack Clarke	17	+38.336	18	
20	21	(Lithuania) Kazim Vasiliauskas	17	+38.653	8	
21	20	(Germany) Jens Höing	17	+46.489	22	
22	9	(Italy) Pietro Gandolfi	17	+1:01.306	34	
23	5	(United Kingdom) Alex Brundle	16	+1 lap	17	
Ret	3	(United Kingdom) Jolyon Palmer	0	DNF	23	
Ret	18	(Switzerland) Natacha Gachnang	0	DNF	14	
Fastest lap: Kazim Vasiliauskas 1:28.322 (163.24 km/h) on lap 4

== Standings after the race ==
Drivers' Championship standings

Pos	Driver	Points
1	(Canada) Robert Wickens	20
2	(Italy) Mirko Bortolotti	11
3	(Brazil) Carlos Iaconelli	9
4	(Russia) Mikhail Aleshin	8
5	(Austria) Philipp Eng	6
