= 2009 Brands Hatch Formula Two round =

Formula Two motor race held in 2009

(United Kingdom) 2009 Brands Hatch Formula Two round
Round details
- Round 4 of 8 in the 2009 FIA Formula Two Championship.
- Location: Brands Hatch, Kent, England
- Course: Permanent racing facility 3.703 km (2.301 mi)

First race
- Date: 18 July 2009
- Laps: 28
Pole position
- Driver: (Austria) Philipp Eng
- Time: 1:17.445
Podium
- First: (Austria) Philipp Eng
- Second: (Spain) Andy Soucek
- Third: (United Kingdom) Henry Surtees
Fastest lap
- Driver: (Italy) Mirko Bortolotti
- Time: 1:18.705 (on lap 8)

Second race
- Date: 19 July 2009
- Laps: 15
Pole position
- Driver: (Spain) Andy Soucek
- Time: 1:16.947
Podium
- First: (Spain) Andy Soucek
- Second: (Canada) Robert Wickens
- Third: (Russia) Mikhail Aleshin
Fastest lap
- Driver: (Spain) Andy Soucek
- Time: 1:17.810 (on lap 14)

The 2009 Brands Hatch Formula Two round was the fourth round of the 2009 FIA Formula Two Championship season. It was held on 18 and 19 July 2009 at Brands Hatch at Kent, United Kingdom.

== Report ==
=== Race 1 ===
The first race was won by Philipp Eng, with Andy Soucek and Henry Surtees also on the podium.

=== Race 2 ===
The second race was won by Andy Soucek, with Robert Wickens and Mikhail Aleshin also on the podium.

The round was overshadowed by the fatal accident suffered by Henry Surtees in the second race. Surtees was hit on the head by a wheel from the car of Jack Clarke after Clarke spun into the wall exiting Westfield Bend. The wheel broke its tether and bounced back across the track into the following group of cars and collided with Surtees' helmet. The car continued straight ahead into the barrier on the approach to Sheene Curve, also losing a wheel, and came to rest at the end of the curve with its remaining rear wheel still spinning. This indicated that Surtees had lost consciousness, with his foot still pressing the accelerator. Surtees was extricated from the car and taken to the circuit's medical centre, where he was stabilised before being transferred to the Royal London Hospital. His death was attributed to severe head injuries, inflicted by colliding with the wheel rather than the following crash with the barriers, and was announced later that day.

== Classification ==
=== Qualifying 1 ===
Weather/Track: Cloud 19°/Dry 26°

Pos	No	Name	Time	Grid
1	33	(Austria) Philipp Eng	1:17.445	1
2	22	(Spain) Andy Soucek	1:17.458	2
3	2	(Sweden) Sebastian Hohenthal	1:17.462	3
4	7	(United Kingdom) Henry Surtees	1:17.547	4
5	15	(Russia) Mikhail Aleshin	1:17.660	5
6	21	(Lithuania) Kazim Vasiliauskas	1:17.665	6
7	12	(Canada) Robert Wickens	1:17.723	7
8	4	(France) Julien Jousse	1:17.749	8
9	14	(Italy) Mirko Bortolotti	1:17.753	9
10	25	(Serbia) Miloš Pavlović	1:17.816	10
11	15	(Brazil) Carlos Iaconelli	1:17.896	11
12	16	(Italy) Edoardo Piscopo	1:17.931	12
13	3	(United Kingdom) Jolyon Palmer	1:17.936	13
14	10	(Italy) Nicola de Marco	1:18.031	14
15	23	(Finland) Henri Karjalainen	1:18.101	15
16	11	(United Kingdom) Jack Clarke	1:18.396	16
17	5	(United Kingdom) Alex Brundle	1:18.433	17
18	8	(Germany) Tobias Hegewald	1:18.448	18
19	27	(Spain) Germán Sánchez	1:18.470	19
20	6	(India) Armaan Ebrahim	1:18.483	20
21	18	(Switzerland) Natacha Gachnang	1:18.532	21
22	24	(United Kingdom) Tom Gladdis	1:18.662	22
23	31	(United Kingdom) Jason Moore	1:18.671	23
24	20	(Germany) Jens Höing	1:19.024	24
25	9	(Italy) Pietro Gandolfi	1:20.132	25

=== Qualifying 2 ===
Weather/Track: Sun 18°/Dry 28°

Pos	No	Name	Time	Grid
1	22	(Spain) Andy Soucek	1:16.947	1
2	12	(Canada) Robert Wickens	1:16.975	2
3	2	(Sweden) Sebastian Hohenthal	1:17.108	3
4	33	(Austria) Philipp Eng	1:17.207	4
5	14	(Italy) Mirko Bortolotti	1:17.299	5
6	15	(Russia) Mikhail Aleshin	1:17.398	6
7	15	(Brazil) Carlos Iaconelli	1:17.423	7
8	7	(United Kingdom) Henry Surtees	1:17.463	8
9	18	(Switzerland) Natacha Gachnang	1:17.476	9
10	8	(Germany) Tobias Hegewald	1:17.481	10
11	16	(Italy) Edoardo Piscopo	1:17.506	11
12	31	(United Kingdom) Jason Moore	1:17.512	12
13	23	(Finland) Henri Karjalainen	1:17.637	13
14	25	(Serbia) Miloš Pavlović	1:17.664	14
15	21	(Lithuania) Kazim Vasiliauskas	1:17.692	15
16	4	(France) Julien Jousse	1:17.709	16
17	24	(United Kingdom) Tom Gladdis	1:17.733	17
18	11	(United Kingdom) Jack Clarke	1:17.801	18
19	10	(Italy) Nicola de Marco	1:17.822	19
20	3	(United Kingdom) Jolyon Palmer	1:18.084	20
21	27	(Spain) Germán Sánchez	1:18.172	21
22	6	(India) Armaan Ebrahim	1:18.247	22
23	20	(Germany) Jens Höing	1:18.628	23
24	9	(Italy) Pietro Gandolfi	1:19.754	24
25	5	(United Kingdom) Alex Brundle	1:35.908	25

=== Race 1 ===
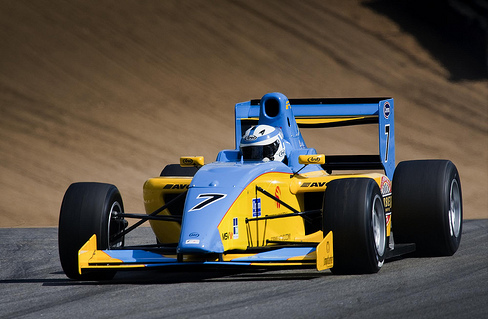
Henry Surtees scored his first podium in the FIA Formula Two Championship the day before his fatal accident.

Weather/Track: Sun 21°/Dry 33°

Pos	No	Driver	Laps	Time/Retired	Grid	Points
1	33	(Austria) Philipp Eng	28	39:01.642	1	10
2	22	(Spain) Andy Soucek	28	+0.494	2	8
3	7	(United Kingdom) Henry Surtees	28	+1.694	4	6
4	12	(Canada) Robert Wickens	28	+3.000	7	5
5	21	(Lithuania) Kazim Vasiliauskas	28	+3.271	6	4
6	17	(Brazil) Carlos Iaconelli	28	+7.398	11	3
7	25	(Serbia) Miloš Pavlović	28	+7.942	10	2
8	16	(Italy) Edoardo Piscopo	28	+8.416	12	1
9	10	(Italy) Nicola de Marco	28	+8.953	14	
10	15	(Russia) Mikhail Aleshin	28	+12.100	5	
11	23	(Finland) Henri Karjalainen	28	+12.666	15	
12	3	(United Kingdom) Jolyon Palmer	28	+14.574	13	
13	24	(United Kingdom) Tom Gladdis	28	+15.072	22	
14	18	(Switzerland) Natacha Gachnang	28	+16.636	21	
15	8	(Germany) Tobias Hegewald	28	+21.503	18	
16	31	(United Kingdom) Jason Moore	28	+23.532	23	
17	27	(Spain) Germán Sánchez	28	+31.820	19	
18	9	(Italy) Pietro Gandolfi	28	+49.727	25	
19	4	(France) Julien Jousse	25	+3 laps/DNF	8	
Ret	14	(Italy) Mirko Bortolotti	22	DNF	9	
Ret	11	(United Kingdom) Jack Clarke	19	DNF	16	
Ret	6	(India) Armaan Ebrahim	16	DNF	20	
Ret	5	(United Kingdom) Alex Brundle	16	DNF	17	
Ret	2	(Sweden) Sebastian Hohenthal	10	DNF	3	
Ret	20	(Germany) Jens Höing	4	DNF	24	
Fastest lap: Mirko Bortolotti 1:18.705 (169.37 km/h) on lap 8

=== Race 2 ===
Weather/Track: Cloud 18°/Damp 27°

Pos	No	Driver	Laps	Time/Retired	Grid	Points
1	22	(Spain) Andy Soucek	15	52:23.670	1	10
2	12	(Canada) Robert Wickens	15	+1.251	2	8
3	15	(Russia) Mikhail Aleshin	15	+4.763	6	6
4	33	(Austria) Philipp Eng	15	+6.858	4	5
5	14	(Italy) Mirko Bortolotti	15	+7.287	5	4
6	8	(Germany) Tobias Hegewald	15	+7.676	10	3
7	16	(Italy) Edoardo Piscopo	15	+8.443	11	2
8	31	(United Kingdom) Jason Moore	15	+9.821	12	1
9	4	(France) Julien Jousse	15	+10.393	16	
10	6	(India) Armaan Ebrahim	15	+10.922	22	
11	5	(United Kingdom) Alex Brundle	15	+11.524	25	
12	21	(Lithuania) Kazim Vasiliauskas	15	+12.150	15	
13	24	(United Kingdom) Tom Gladdis	15	+12.661	17	
14	2	(Sweden) Sebastian Hohenthal	15	+12.868	3	
15	18	(Switzerland) Natacha Gachnang	15	+13.600	9	
16	3	(United Kingdom) Jolyon Palmer	15	+14.330	20	
17	17	(Brazil) Carlos Iaconelli	15	+15.678	7	
18	23	(Finland) Henri Karjalainen	13	+2 laps	13	
Ret	9	(Italy) Pietro Gandolfi	12	DNF	24	
Ret	11	(United Kingdom) Jack Clarke	8	DNF	18	
Ret	7	(United Kingdom) Henry Surtees	8	Fatal accident	8	
Ret	27	(Spain) Germán Sánchez	4	DNF	21	
Ret	25	(Serbia) Miloš Pavlović	1	DNF	14	
Ret	20	(Germany) Jens Höing	0	DNF	23	
Ret	10	(Italy) Nicola de Marco	0	DNF	19	
Fastest lap: Andy Soucek 1:17.810 (171.32 km/h) on lap 14

== Standings after the race ==
Drivers' Championship standings

Pos	Driver	Points
1	(Spain) Andy Soucek	46
2	(Canada) Robert Wickens	39
3	(Austria) Philipp Eng	27
4	(Germany) Tobias Hegewald	25
5	(Italy) Mirko Bortolotti	25
