= Williams JPH1 =

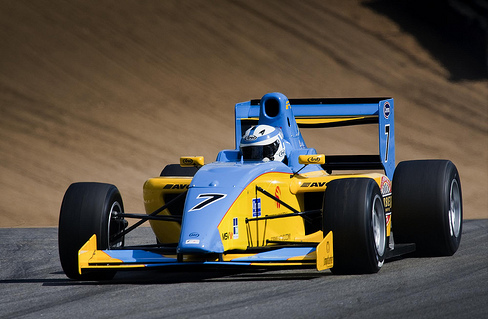
- Henry Surtees driving at the 2009 Brands Hatch Formula Two round.
- Designer: Williams Grand Prix Engineering

Technical specifications
- Wheelbase: 2,885 mm (113.6 in)
- Engine: Audi 1.8-litre 4cyl 20v Turbo
- Transmission: 6-speed Hewland TMT sequential paddle shift transaxle with LSD and hydraulic actuation
- Weight: 570 kg (1,257 lb) (dry weight)

Competition history
- Debut: 2009 Valencia Formula Two round
- Last event: 2012 Monza Formula Two round
Races	Wins	F/Laps
66	66	66
- Teams' Championships: 3
- Drivers' Championships: 3

The Williams JPH1 is an open-wheel racing car developed by British manufacturer Williams for use in the FIA Formula Two Championship.

== Design ==
=== History ===
The car was presented on 2 March 2009 in Fawkham (Great Britain, Kent) at the Brands Hatch track, where on the same day Steven Kane - BTCC driver drove it on the track for the first time.

=== Chassis ===
Named after both Jonathan Palmer and Patrick Head, the Williams JPH1 chassis and survival cell is of carbon fibre composite monocoque construction.

=== Powertrain ===
The internal combustion engine is a new turbocharged petrol engine based on the Audi 1.8-litre 20 valve block and head, as used in Formula Palmer Audi. Whereas the engine in the FPA car primarily uses standard road car components, the Audi F2 engine has been developed as a pure race engine. Prepared and built by Mountune Racing, the crankshaft, connecting rods, pistons, valves and camshafts are all-new components designed for high strength and light weight. The dry sump system has been re-designed so the engine sits 35 millimetres (1.4 in) lower than in the FPA car.

The turbocharger is an all new Garrett GT35 unit featuring roller bearings for improved response, with an external wastegate with high speed closed loop pneumatic valve boost control for absolutely precise automatic boost control. The engine management system is a Pi Research Pectel electronic engine control unit (ECU), the MQ12, which has more capability than the unit in FPA.

For its initial 2009 season, continuous maximum engine power was 400 brake horsepower (298 kW; 406 PS) at 8,250 rpm. The F2 car features a "push to pass/defend" overboost, with 450 brake horsepower (336 kW; 456 PS) being available for a maximum duration of 6 seconds, available ten times during each race. From 2010, continuous base power was increased to 425 brake horsepower (317 kW; 431 PS), with an even higher gain from overboost to 480 brake horsepower (358 kW; 487 PS).

The transmission is a new unit designed by Hewland specifically for Formula Two, the TMT. It has six forward speeds, and is operated by steering wheel mounted paddle shifters.

== Williams JPH1B ==
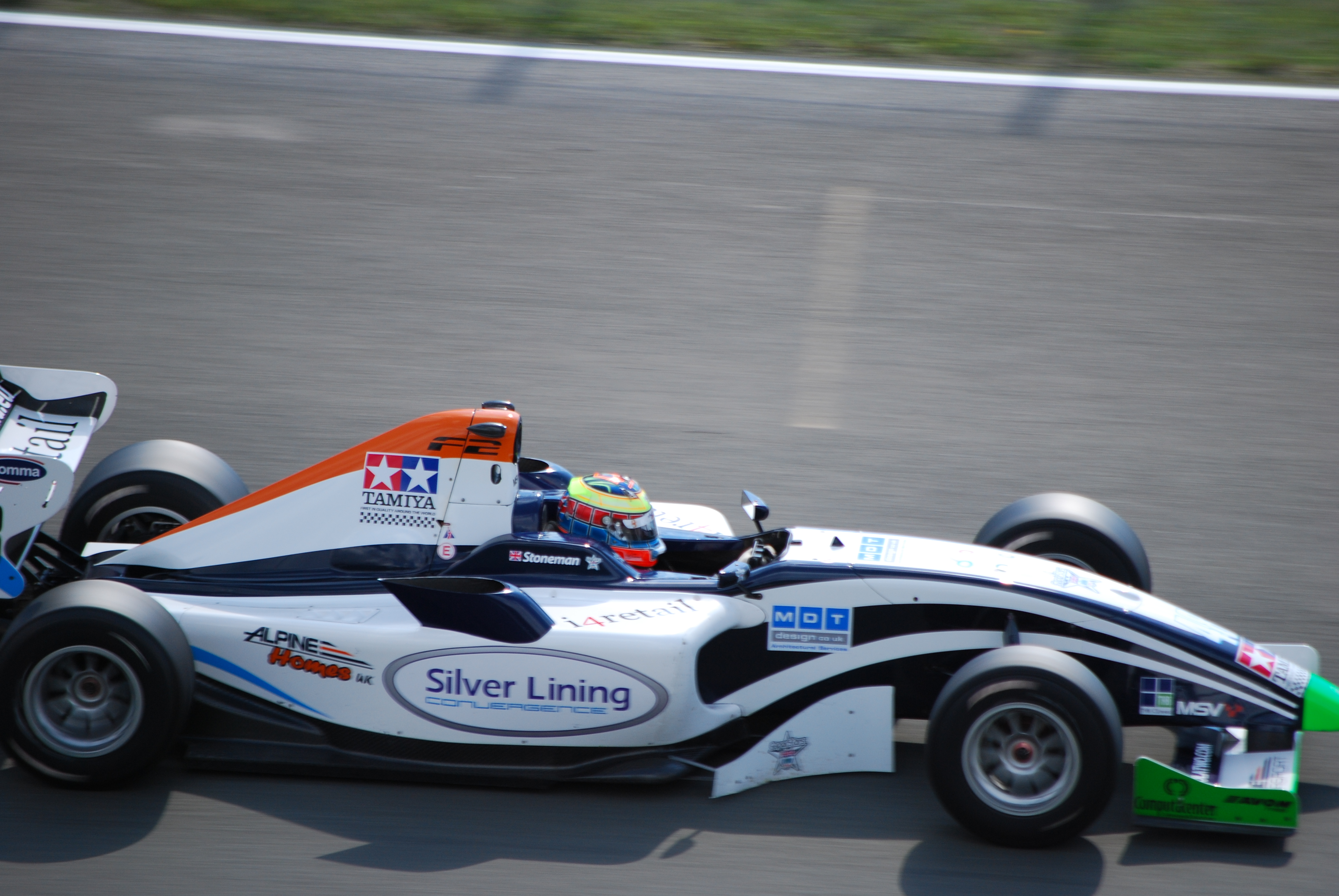
Dean Stoneman driving at the 2010 Oschersleben Formula Two round.

The car was quite substantially upgraded by both Williams and MotorSport Vision for the 2010 season. The new model came to be called the Williams JPH1B.

Aerodynamic changes were the main thing made to this version. This meant that the car's maximum downforce increased by 30 percent and the aerodynamic efficiency increased by 24 percent. The aerodynamics package, with front and rear wings, was also updated, among other things to make the air flow better under the car. It also meant that there were more downforce levels to experiment with for drivers and engineers. They also increased the size of the front tires and started using a softer rubber compound, to get better grip and better performance. An upgraded differential provided better stability into and through curves. The water system was changed to improve cooling. Compared to a Formula 3 car's 794 kilograms of downforce at 241 km/h, the JPH1B is over 907 kilograms.

Engine power had been increased from 400 bhp to 425. When using "push-to-pass" engine power was now 480 bhp. This was increased even more for the 2011 season. Now instead you get 500bhp at "push-to-pass", which is 75 more than in standard mode.

Both versions used a Hewland six-speed semi-automatic sequential gearbox, which is regulated using paddles behind the steering wheel.
