= Kazim Vasiliauskas =

Lithuanian racing driver

- Nationality: (Lithuania) Lithuanian
- Born: Kazimieras Vasiliauskas; 2 August 1990 (age 36) Kaišiadorys, Lithuania

FIA Formula Two Championship
- Years active: 2009 - 2010
- Starts: 34
- Wins: 2
- Poles: 3
- Fastest laps: 4
- Best finish: 4th in 2010

Previous series
- 2009-2010 2009 2008 2008: FIA Formula Two; Formula Palmer Audi; Formula Renault 2.0 Italia; Eurocup Formula Renault 2.0

Kazimieras "Kazim" Vasiliauskas (born 2 August 1990) is a Lithuanian former racing driver.

== Racing career ==
=== Karting ===
Vasiliauskas was born in Kaišiadorys. He competed in kart racing from 1999 to 2007, winning several Lithuanian and Baltic championships including the Lithuanian Karting KF3 Championship in 2002 and the Lithuanian Karting KF1 Championship in 2005.

=== Formula Renault ===
Vasiliauskas moved up to formula racing in 2008, competing part-season in both the Italian Formula Renault Championship and the Formula Renault 2.0 Eurocup with Prema Powerteam. He finished 21st in the Italian series and did not score any points in the Eurocup. His best race finish was sixteenth in the final round in Barcelona.

=== Formula Palmer Audi ===
Vasiliauskas competed in the 2009 Formula Palmer Audi Championship. Despite only achieving two wins, his title hopes only ended at the first corner of the final race, where a first-corner crash with Tristan Vautier gifted the title to Richard Plant. Vasiliauskas finished as runner-up.

=== Formula Two ===
Vasiliauskas signed to drive for the relaunched FIA Formula Two Championship in 2009, becoming the first Lithuanian driver to compete at an international level of motorsport. He finished seventh overall, with one win and one pole position, both at Imola.

Vasiliauskas returned to the series in 2010 after being under threat to miss the first round of the championship when his primary sponsor pulled out just one week before the start of the season. However, Vasiliauskas competed in the Formula 2 season-opener at Silverstone and, despite missing pre-season testing, finished fifth and seventh in the first and second races respectively. He achieved his first pole position of the season Brands Hatch, after being only eleventh in the first race of the weekend. However, after leading first half of the race, Vasiliauskas retired with a gear box failure. He achieved his second pole position in 2010 at Valencia, last race of the season, and led from start to finish to score his first and only win in the 2010 Formula Two campaign. He finished in fourth place overall.

Vasiliauskas left F2 at the end of 2010, and was without a regular drive in 2011. He participated in the 1000-km-race in the Baltic countries in a sportscar in July 2011. Vasiliauskas announced to Lithuanian media in February 2012 that he will now focus on his career in law, citing problems finding sponsorship money for a further career in racing (e.g. GP2). Vasiliauskas is the first and only Lithuanian to date to have won races in an international open-wheel racing series.

== Racing record ==
=== Career summary ===
Season	Series	Team	Races	Wins	Poles	F/Laps	Podiums	Points	Position
2008	Formula Renault 2.0 Eurocup	Prema Powerteam	17	0	0	0	0	0	NC
2008	Formula Renault 2.0 Italy	Prema Powerteam	17	0	0	0	0	30	21st
2008	Italian Formula Renault 2.0 Winter Series	CO2 Motorsport	2	1	0	1	1	54	**2nd**
2009	Formula Palmer Audi	MotorSport Vision	20	2	3	1	11	313	**2nd**
2009	FIA Formula Two Championship	MotorSport Vision	16	1	1	2	4	45	7th
2010	FIA Formula Two Championship	MotorSport Vision	18	1	2	2	6	153	4th

=== Complete Eurocup Formula Renault 2.0 results ===
(key) (Races in bold indicate pole position; races in italics indicate fastest lap)

Year	Entrant	1	2	3	4	5	6	7	8	9	10	11	12	13	14	DC	Points
2008	Prema Powerteam	SPA; 1; 33	SPA; 2 Ret	SIL; 1	SIL; 2	HUN; 1	HUN; 2	NÜR; 1; 33	NÜR; 2; 28	LMS; 1 Ret	LMS; 2; 22	EST; 1; 27	EST; 2; 20	CAT; 1 Ret	CAT; 2; 16	40th	0

=== Complete FIA Formula Two Championship results ===
(key) (Races in bold indicate pole position) (Races in italics indicate fastest lap)

Year	1	2	3	4	5	6	7	8	9	10	11	12	13	14	15	16	17	18	DC	Points
2009	VAL; 1; 3	VAL; 2; 20	BRN; 1 Ret	BRN; 2; 8	SPA; 1; 10	SPA; 2; 7	BRH; 1; 5	BRH; 2; 12	DON; 1 Ret	DON; 2; 2	OSC; 1; 3	OSC; 2; 7	**IMO**; **1**; 1	IMO; 2 Ret	CAT; 1; 8	CAT; 2; 4			7th	45
2010	SIL; 1; 5	SIL; 2; 7	MAR; 1; 10	MAR; 2; 4	MNZ; 1; 3	MNZ; 2 Ret	ZOL; 1; 3	ZOL; 2; 7	ALG; 1; 4	ALG; 2 Ret	BRH; 1; 11	**BRH**; **2** Ret	BRN; 1; 11	BRN; 2; 3	OSC; 1; 2	OSC; 2; 2	VAL; 1 Ret	**VAL**; **2**; 1	4th	153
