= 2009 FIA Formula Two Championship =

Motor racing season

2009 FIA Formula Two season

Seasons
- ← none 2010 →

The 2009 FIA Formula Two Championship season was the first year of the relaunched FIA Formula Two Championship. The championship began on 30 May at the Circuit de Valencia and finished on 1 November at the Circuit de Catalunya, after eight double-header rounds. Andy Soucek was a dominant champion, finishing over 50 points clear of runner-up Robert Wickens.

The season was overshadowed by the death of Henry Surtees during the second race at Brands Hatch.

== Background & championship format ==
The series saw the drivers using a chassis that was built at the WilliamsF1 team's headquarters at Grove in Oxfordshire. It was named as the JPH1, incorporating the initials of series boss Jonathan Palmer and Patrick Head, engineering director for Williams. The car was given two shakedown tests at Palmer's Bedford Autodrome by Steven Kane, before the car was officially launched on 2 March at Brands Hatch – the headquarters of MotorSport Vision, who run all the cars in the series.

At each event there were two 30-minute practice sessions, two 30-minute qualifying sessions and two races of varying length; the distances for each announced prior to each race weekend. Points were awarded to the top eight drivers in the race, and were awarded in the same system as Formula One: 10-8-6-5-4-3-2-1, and only a driver's best fourteen scores counted towards the championship. That said, no driver had to drop scores in the championship due to all of them having two or more non-points-scoring races.

The winner of the FIA Formula Two Championship received a full test with the AT&T Williams F1 team, which was run in such a way as to seriously evaluate the driver with regard to their potential as a Formula One driver. Drivers finishing in the first three places in the final classification of the Formula Two Championship qualified for an FIA Super Licence.

== Drivers ==
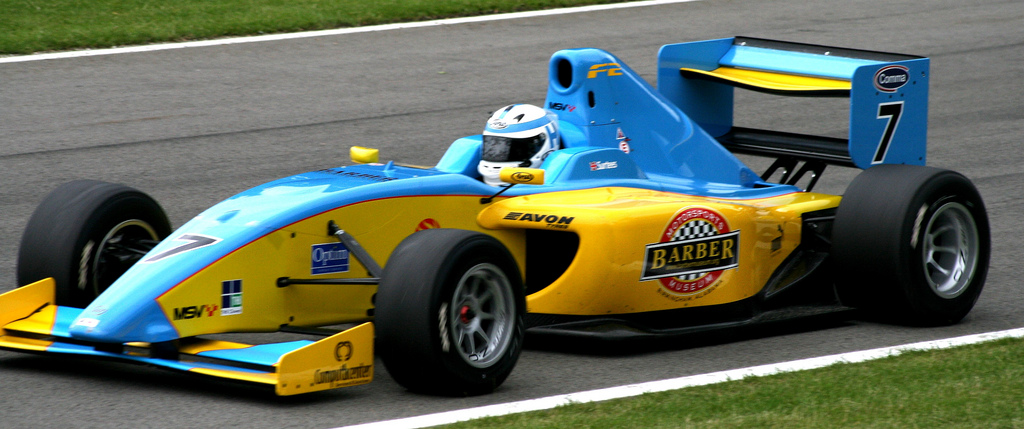
The season was overshadowed by the fatal accident suffered by Henry Surtees at Brands Hatch. All the cars carried a tribute to Surtees for the rest of the season.

- During a question & answer session at the 2009 Autosport International show in Birmingham, series boss Jonathan Palmer announced that the Formula Two field will expand from 20 to 24 cars. This then became 25 as Edoardo Piscopo joined the line-up and Jens Höing returned after contractual issues. After Henry Surtees' death, there were only 24 cars at Donington Park, before returning to 25 for Oschersleben, with Ollie Hancock making his debut.

| No. | Driver | Rounds |
|---|---|---|
| 2 | (Sweden) Sebastian Hohenthal | All |
| 3 | (United Kingdom) Jolyon Palmer | All |
| 4 | (France) Julien Jousse | All |
| 5 | (United Kingdom) Alex Brundle | All |
| 6 | (India) Armaan Ebrahim | All |
| 7 | (United Kingdom) Henry Surtees † | 1–4 |
| 8 | (Germany) Tobias Hegewald | All |
| 9 | (Italy) Pietro Gandolfi | All |
| 10 | (Italy) Nicola de Marco | All |
| 11 | (United Kingdom) Jack Clarke | All |
| 12 | (Canada) Robert Wickens | All |
| 14 | (Italy) Mirko Bortolotti | All |
| 15 | (Russia) Mikhail Aleshin | All |
| 16 | (Italy) Edoardo Piscopo | 1–7 |
| 17 | (Brazil) Carlos Iaconelli | 1–7 |
| 18 | (Switzerland) Natacha Gachnang | All |
| 20 | (Germany) Jens Höing | All |
| 21 | (Lithuania) Kazim Vasiliauskas | All |
| 22 | (Spain) Andy Soucek | All |
| 23 | (Finland) Henri Karjalainen | All |
| 24 | (United Kingdom) Tom Gladdis | All |
| 25 | (Serbia) Miloš Pavlović | All |
| 27 | (Spain) Germán Sánchez | All |
| 31 | (United Kingdom) Jason Moore | All |
| 33 | (Austria) Philipp Eng | All |
| 38 | (France) Tristan Vautier | 8 |
| 44 | (United Kingdom) Ollie Hancock | 5–8 |

=== Driver changes ===
Entering FIA Formula Two Championship

- Red Bull Junior drivers Mikhail Aleshin and Robert Wickens moved to the series after competing in the Formula Renault 3.5 Series for Carlin Motorsport. They were joined by Julien Jousse, who also competed with Tech 1 Racing.
- Italian Formula Three champion Mirko Bortolotti and Italian Formula Three runner-up Edoardo Piscopo graduated into the championship.
- Formula Palmer Audi front-runners Alex Brundle, Jack Clarke, Jason Moore and Jolyon Palmer continued their collaboration with MotorSport Vision into the series.
- Armaan Ebrahim switched from Formula V6 Asia to the revived series.
- Philipp Eng, who competed in Formula BMW Europe and the German Formula Three Championship joined the series' grid. Another German Formula Three driver, Jens Höing, also moved into the series.
- Spanish Formula Three front-runners Germán Sánchez, Natacha Gachnang and Nicola de Marco all moved into the championship.
- Pietro Gandolfi graduated from LO Formula Renault 2.0 Suisse into the series.
- Tom Gladdis and Henri Karjalainen returned to Europe after participating in the Star Mazda Championship and the Atlantic Championship respectively.
- Tobias Hegewald, who had a dual programme in the Formula Renault 2.0 Northern European Cup and the Formula Renault Eurocup moved in the series.
- British Formula Renault drivers Sebastian Hohenthal and Henry Surtees debuted in the series.
- GP2 Series drivers Carlos Iaconelli, Miloš Pavlović and Andy Soucek debuted in the newly created category.
- Kazim Vasiliauskas, who participated in both the Italian Formula Renault Championship and the Formula Renault Eurocup, also joined the series.

Midseason changes

† – Surtees was fatally injured after an accident, during the second race at the fourth round at Brands Hatch. Surtees' slot was filled by Ollie Hancock after round five.

- Edoardo Piscopo missed the final round to participate in the first round of 2009–10 GP2 Asia Series season. His slot was filled by Tristan Vautier.

== Testing Results ==
The first group test was held on 6 May, at Snetterton in Norfolk. In the morning, 21 of the series' 24 drivers were within a second of each other. Two sessions were held, one in the morning and one in the afternoon. There was another group test at Silverstone on 18 May, with two dry sessions and one wet session. Two other test days were held during the session, one at Donington Park, and one at Circuit de Catalunya.

== Calendar ==
The Formula Two calendar consists of eight rounds with two races at each event.

| Round | | Circuit/Location | Country | Date | Supporting |
|---|---|---|---|---|---|
| 1 | R1 | Circuit Ricardo Tormo, Valencia | Spain | 30 May | WTCC Race of Spain |
| 1 | R2 | Circuit Ricardo Tormo, Valencia | Spain | 31 May | WTCC Race of Spain |
| 2 | R1 | Masaryk Circuit, Brno | Czech Republic | 20 June | WTCC Race of the Czech Republic |
| 2 | R2 | Masaryk Circuit, Brno | Czech Republic | 21 June | WTCC Race of the Czech Republic |
| 3 | R1 | Circuit de Spa-Francorchamps | Belgium | 27 June | International GT Open |
| 3 | R2 | Circuit de Spa-Francorchamps | Belgium | 28 June | International GT Open |
| 4 | R1 | Brands Hatch, Kent | United Kingdom | 18 July | WTCC Race of UK |
| 4 | R2 | Brands Hatch, Kent | United Kingdom | 19 July | WTCC Race of UK |
| 5 | R1 | Donington Park | United Kingdom | 16 August | Stand-alone event |
| 5 | R2 | Donington Park | United Kingdom | 16 August | Stand-alone event |
| 6 | R1 | Motorsport Arena Oschersleben | Germany | 5 September | WTCC Race of Germany |
| 6 | R2 | Motorsport Arena Oschersleben | Germany | 6 September | WTCC Race of Germany |
| 7 | R1 | Autodromo Enzo e Dino Ferrari, Imola | Italy | 19 September | WTCC Race of Italy |
| 7 | R2 | Autodromo Enzo e Dino Ferrari, Imola | Italy | 20 September | WTCC Race of Italy |
| 8 | R1 | Circuit de Catalunya, Barcelona | Spain | 31 October | International GT Open |
| 8 | R2 | Circuit de Catalunya, Barcelona | Spain | 1 November | International GT Open |

== Results ==
| Round | | Circuit | Pole position | Fastest lap | Winning driver | Report |
|---|---|---|---|---|---|---|
| 1 | R1 | (Spain) Valencia | (Canada) Robert Wickens | (Canada) Robert Wickens | (Canada) Robert Wickens | Report |
| 1 | R2 | (Spain) Valencia | (Canada) Robert Wickens | (Lithuania) Kazim Vasiliauskas | (Canada) Robert Wickens | Report |
| 2 | R1 | (Czech Republic) Brno | (Italy) Nicola de Marco | (Canada) Robert Wickens | (Italy) Mirko Bortolotti | Report |
| 2 | R2 | (Czech Republic) Brno | (United Kingdom) Henry Surtees | (Italy) Nicola de Marco | (Spain) Andy Soucek | Report |
| 3 | R1 | (Belgium) Spa-Francorchamps | (Germany) Tobias Hegewald | (Germany) Tobias Hegewald | (Germany) Tobias Hegewald | Report |
| 3 | R2 | (Belgium) Spa-Francorchamps | (Germany) Tobias Hegewald | (Germany) Tobias Hegewald | (Germany) Tobias Hegewald | Report |
| 4 | R1 | (United Kingdom) Brands Hatch | (Austria) Philipp Eng | (Italy) Mirko Bortolotti | (Austria) Philipp Eng | Report |
| 4 | R2 | (United Kingdom) Brands Hatch | (Spain) Andy Soucek | (Spain) Andy Soucek | (Spain) Andy Soucek | Report |
| 5 | R1 | (United Kingdom) Donington Park | (Germany) Tobias Hegewald | (France) Julien Jousse | (Spain) Andy Soucek | Report |
| 5 | R2 | (United Kingdom) Donington Park | (France) Julien Jousse | (France) Julien Jousse | (France) Julien Jousse | Report |
| 6 | R1 | (Germany) Oschersleben | (Spain) Andy Soucek | (Spain) Andy Soucek | (Spain) Andy Soucek | Report |
| 6 | R2 | (Germany) Oschersleben | (Russia) Mikhail Aleshin | (Serbia) Miloš Pavlović | (Russia) Mikhail Aleshin | Report |
| 7 | R1 | (Italy) Imola | (Lithuania) Kazim Vasiliauskas | (Lithuania) Kazim Vasiliauskas | (Lithuania) Kazim Vasiliauskas | Report |
| 7 | R2 | (Italy) Imola | (Canada) Robert Wickens | (Canada) Robert Wickens | (Spain) Andy Soucek | Report |
| 8 | R1 | (Spain) Catalunya | (Canada) Robert Wickens | (United Kingdom) Jason Moore | (Spain) Andy Soucek | Report |
| 8 | R2 | (Spain) Catalunya | (Canada) Robert Wickens | (Spain) Andy Soucek | (Spain) Andy Soucek | Report |

== Championship Standings ==
| Pos | Driver | VAL (Spain) | | BRN (Czech Republic) | | SPA (Belgium) | | BRH (United Kingdom) | | DON (United Kingdom) | | OSC (Germany) | | IMO (Italy) | | CAT (Spain) | | Points |
|---|---|---|---|---|---|---|---|---|---|---|---|---|---|---|---|---|---|---|
| 1 | (Spain) Andy Soucek | Ret | 4 | 17 | 1 | 4 | 2 | 2 | 1 | 1 | 4 | 1 | 2 | 3 | 1 | 1 | 1 | 115 |
| 2 | (Canada) Robert Wickens | 1 | 1 | 9 | Ret | Ret | 3 | 4 | 2 | Ret | Ret | 8 | 4 | 4 | 2 | Ret | 3 | 64 |
| 3 | (Russia) Mikhail Aleshin | 4 | 6 | 2 | Ret | 18 | 8 | 10 | 3 | 2 | 7 | 5 | 1 | 7 | Ret | 2 | 7 | 59 |
| 4 | (Italy) Mirko Bortolotti | 6 | 2 | 1 | Ret | 9 | 9 | Ret | 5 | 10 | 3 | 2 | Ret | 2 | Ret | 6 | Ret | 50 |
| 5 | (France) Julien Jousse | 5 | 10 | 5 | 2 | 3 | 6 | 19 | 9 | 7 | 1 | Ret | 3 | 10 | Ret | 4 | 8 | 49 |
| 6 | (Germany) Tobias Hegewald | Ret | 9 | 15 | 7 | 1 | 1 | 15 | 6 | 3 | 6 | Ret | 6 | Ret | 4 | 9 | 5 | 46 |
| 7 | (Lithuania) Kazim Vasiliauskas | 3 | 20 | Ret | 8 | 10 | 7 | 5 | 12 | Ret | 2 | 3 | 7 | 1 | Ret | 8 | 4 | 45 |
| 8 | (Austria) Philipp Eng | 12 | 3 | 3 | 9 | Ret | Ret | 1 | 4 | 5 | 10 | Ret | Ret | 5 | 10 | 5 | 9 | 39 |
| 9 | (Serbia) Miloš Pavlović | Ret | 17 | Ret | 5 | 2 | 4 | 7 | Ret | Ret | 8 | Ret | 21 | 6 | 3 | 10 | 19 | 29 |
| 10 | (Italy) Nicola de Marco | 9 | 5 | 12 | 3 | 13 | 11 | 9 | Ret | Ret | Ret | 6 | 5 | Ret | 9 | 11 | 2 | 25 |
| 11 | (Brazil) Carlos Iaconelli | 2 | 8 | Ret | Ret | Ret | 10 | 6 | 17 | Ret | 9 | 4 | 10 | Ret | 5 | | | 21 |
| 12 | (Italy) Edoardo Piscopo | Ret | 7 | 7 | 4 | 8 | 14 | 8 | 7 | 4 | Ret | 12 | 8 | 13 | Ret | | | 19 |
| 13 | (France) Tristan Vautier | | | | | | | | | | | | | | | 3 | 6 | 9 |
| 14 | (United Kingdom) Henry Surtees^{†} | 7 | 12 | Ret | Ret | 15 | Ret | 3 | Ret | | | | | | | | | 8 |
| 15 | (Finland) Henri Karjalainen | 17 | 15 | 4 | 16 | 7 | 15 | 11 | 18 | 15 | 13 | Ret | 15 | 11 | 15 | 16 | 17 | 7 |
| 16 | (Sweden) Sebastian Hohenthal | 10 | 13 | Ret | 12 | 17 | 12 | Ret | 14 | 6 | 5 | 17 | 9 | 9 | 12 | Ret | Ret | 7 |
| 17 | (India) Armaan Ebrahim | 15 | 16 | 6 | 6 | DNS | Ret | Ret | 10 | 8 | Ret | 9 | 13 | Ret | Ret | 12 | 10 | 7 |
| 18 | (United Kingdom) Jack Clarke | 13 | 19 | Ret | 15 | 5 | Ret | Ret | Ret | 9 | 14 | 7 | Ret | 14 | 14 | 17 | 14 | 6 |
| 19 | (United Kingdom) Alex Brundle | 8 | 23 | 11 | Ret | Ret | 5 | Ret | 11 | 14 | Ret | Ret | 11 | 17 | Ret | 15 | 12 | 5 |
| 20 | (United Kingdom) Tom Gladdis | 19 | 18 | 8 | 10 | 6 | Ret | 13 | 13 | 17 | Ret | 16 | 17 | 16 | 13 | 14 | 15 | 4 |
| 21 | (United Kingdom) Jolyon Palmer | 21 | Ret | 10 | 14 | 16 | Ret | 12 | 16 | 16 | 12 | 15 | 19 | 12 | 6 | 13 | 11 | 3 |
| 22 | (United Kingdom) Jason Moore | 16 | 14 | 13 | 11 | Ret | DNS | 16 | 8 | 11 | Ret | 14 | 20 | 18 | 7 | 19 | 16 | 3 |
| 23 | (Switzerland) Natacha Gachnang | 11 | Ret | 14 | Ret | 11 | 13 | 14 | 15 | 13 | Ret | 11 | 12 | 15 | Ret | 7 | 13 | 2 |
| 24 | (Spain) Germán Sánchez | 14 | 11 | 16 | Ret | 12 | Ret | 17 | Ret | 12 | 11 | Ret | 16 | 8 | 8 | DNS | DNS | 2 |
| 25 | (United Kingdom) Ollie Hancock | | | | | | | | | 10 | 18 | Ret | 11 | Ret | 11 | 18 | 18 | 0 |
| 26 | (Germany) Jens Höing | 18 | 21 | Ret | 13 | Ret | 16 | Ret | Ret | Ret | Ret | Ret | 14 | Ret | Ret | Ret | 21 | 0 |
| 27 | (Italy) Pietro Gandolfi | 20 | 22 | Ret | Ret | 14 | 17 | 18 | Ret | Ret | 15 | NC | 22 | Ret | Ret | Ret | 20 | 0 |
| Pos | Driver | VAL (Spain) | | BRN (Czech Republic) | | SPA (Belgium) | | BRH (United Kingdom) | | DON (United Kingdom) | | OSC (Germany) | | IMO (Italy) | | CAT (Spain) | | Points |

| Colour | Result |
|---|---|
| Gold | Winner |
| Silver | Second place |
| Bronze | Third place |
| Green | Points classification |
| Blue | Non-points classification |
| Blue | Non-classified finish (NC) |
| Purple | Retired, not classified (Ret) |
| Red | Did not qualify (DNQ) |
| Red | Did not pre-qualify (DNPQ) |
| Black | Disqualified (DSQ) |
| White | Did not start (DNS) |
| White | Withdrew (WD) |
| White | Race cancelled (C) |
| Blank | Did not practice (DNP) |
| Blank | Did not arrive (DNA) |
| Blank | Excluded (EX) |
