= Ollie Hancock =

British racing driver

- Nationality: (United Kingdom) British
- Born: Oliver Joseph Hancock; 25 August 1987 (age 39) Windsor, England
- Relatives: Sam Hancock (brother)

European Le Mans Series career
- Current team: TF Sport
- Categorisation: FIA Gold (until 2013); FIA Silver (2014–)
- Car number: 95
- Starts: 250+
- Wins: 50+
- Poles: 20+
- Fastest laps: 50+
- Best finish: 1st in 2008

Previous series
- FIA World Endurance Championship IMSA European Le Mans Series Asian Le Mans Series Michelin Le Mans Cup Blancpain Endurance Series British GT Championship Formula Renault UK; FRUK Winter Series; Formula Renault BARC; Sports Racing Masters; World Sportscar Masters; Classic Formula Ford 2000; Classic FF2000 Winter Series

Championship titles
- 2008: Formula Renault BARC

Oliver Joseph Hancock (born 25 August 1987) is a British racing driver. Hancock is the son of historic racing driver Anthony Hancock, and the younger brother of sportscar racer Sam Hancock.

== Career ==
=== Formula Ford ===
Hancock was born in Windsor, Berkshire, and began karting at the age of eight. He competed in five races before having to give up because of a shortage of funds. In the meantime, he rode motorcycles around the Hancock family home. He eventually moved into single-seaters in 2003, competing in the winter series of the Classic Formula Ford 2000 championship, campaigning a Van Diemen RF82. He would go on to win the championship.

Hancock moved up into the series full-time in 2004, and would finish up second overall, just a point behind the champion; achieving four pole positions, a win and ten podiums in the process. He did not acquire a sufficient budget for the 2005 racing season, but instead of sitting out the whole season, Hancock chose to improve his technical ability by taking the No. 2 mechanic role at the Formula Renault UK team Welch Motorsport, in the hope of returning to racing in 2006. He did return to the series in 2006 but again finished as runner-up, despite three wins, three poles and podiums in every race.

=== Formula Renault ===
Hancock moved up to the Formula Renault BARC Championship for 2007, competing for Mark Burdett Motorsport. He finished as the best rookie driver in the championship, in third overall, with two pole positions and a win all coming at Silverstone. He continued in the series in 2008, and dominated the championship, wrapping up the title with a round to spare. Five wins, three poles and six fastest laps allowed him to sit out the Silverstone finale, as he already had a 44-point lead over closest challenger Johannes Seidlitz. During the season, the British Racing Drivers' Club awarded him with a Rising Star invitation to that particular scheme.

Hancock planned to graduate the main Formula Renault UK championship for the season finale at Brands Hatch, but decided to focus on his 2009 campaign instead. He raced in the first twelve rounds of the championship, before encountering budgetary troubles. His best finish was fourth in the second race at Donington Park.

=== Formula Two ===
Hancock moved up to the FIA Formula Two Championship starting with the rounds at Oschersleben. He replaced the late Henry Surtees in the championship, but did not drive his No. 7 machine. He instead competed in car No. 44. He finished 25th in the championship, with no points.

== Racing record ==
=== Career summary ===
Season	Series	Team	Races	Wins	Poles	F/Laps	Podiums	Points	Position
2003	Classic Formula Ford 2000 Winter Series		3	?	?	?	1	?	?
2003	Monoposto Racing Club (1800 class)		2	2 (class)	2 (class)	1 (class)	2 (class)	31	6th
2004	Classic Formula Ford 2000		?	1	4	?	10	?	2nd
2006	Classic Formula Ford 2000		10	3	3	?	10	?	2nd
2007	Formula Renault BARC	Mark Burdett Motorsport	12	1	2	1	4	85	3rd
2007	Sports Racing Masters		1	0	1	0	0	?	?
2007	World Sportscar Masters		1	1	0	1	1	?	?
2008	Formula Renault BARC	Apotex Scorpio Motorsport	10	5	2	6	9	130	1st
2008	Formula Renault UK Winter Series	Apotex Scorpio Motorsport	3	0	0	0	0	41	10th
2009	FIA Formula Two Championship	MotorSport Vision	6	0	0	0	0	0	25th
2009	Formula Renault UK	Apotex Scorpio Motorsport	12	0	0	0	0	64	22nd

=== Complete FIA Formula Two Championship results ===
(key) (Races in bold indicate pole position) (Races in italics indicate fastest lap)

Year	1	2	3	4	5	6	7	8	9	10	11	12	13	14	15	16	DC	Points
2009	VAL; 1	VAL; 2	BRN; 1	BRN; 2	SPA; 1	SPA; 2	BRH; 1	BRH; 2	DON; 1	DON; 2	OSC; 1; 10	OSC; 2; 18	IMO; 1 Ret	IMO; 2; 11	CAT; 1; 18	CAT; 2; 18	25th	0

=== Complete 24 Hours of Le Mans results ===
Year	Team	Co-Drivers	Car	Class	Laps	Pos.	Class Pos.
2021	(United Kingdom) TF Sport	(United Kingdom) Ross Gunn (United Kingdom) John Hartshorne	Aston Martin Vantage AMR	GTE; Am	332	35th	8th

Sporting positions
Preceded by Hywel Lloyd	Formula Renault BARC; Champion; 2008	Succeeded by Kieren Clark
