= Henri Karjalainen =

Finnish racing driver (born 1986)

- Nationality: (Finland) Finnish
- Born: Henri Mikael Karjalainen; February 19, 1986 (age 40) Helsinki, Finland

GT Finnish Championship career
- Debut season: 2010
- Current team: Ferrari Team Nurminen
- Car number: 10
- Starts: 1
- Wins: 0
- Poles: 0
- Fastest laps: 0

Previous series
- 2009 2008 2007 2006-07 2006 2004-05: FIA Formula Two Championship; Atlantic Championship; GP2 Series; Asian Formula Three; Asian Formula Renault; Formula BMW ADAC

Henri Mikael Karjalainen (born February 19, 1986, in Helsinki) is a Finnish racing driver. He raced in the GT Finnish Championship in 2010. Karjalainen is managed by Finnish Sport Management Agency SportElite.

== Career ==
=== Karting ===
Karjalainen competed in karting from 2000 to 2003.

=== Single-seaters ===
==== Formula BMW ====
Karjalainen moved up to German Formula BMW for 2004, and stayed in the same series for 2005. He scored a total of five points from his two years in the series.

==== Asian-based series ====
Karjalainen moved to Asia for 2006, competing in both the Formula Three and Formula Renault series based in the continent. He achieved greater success, and finished as runner-up in the 2007 Asian F3 standings.

==== GP2 Series ====
Karjalainen was given the opportunity to compete in the GP2 Series in 2007 by the BCN Competicion team, following a shoulder injury to compatriot Markus Niemelä which prevented him from driving. He made his debut at Istanbul Park, failing to finish in the both races. He was replaced by the recovered Niemelä for the next race meeting.

==== Atlantic Championship ====
Karjalainen moved to North America in 2008 to compete in the Atlantic Championship. He raced for Jensen MotorSport finishing 17th in overall standings with tenth position in Grand Prix de Trois-Rivière being his best individual finish.

==== Formula Two ====
In 2009, Karjalainen participated in the reformed Formula Two series. He was keen to be the next Finn after Keke Rosberg to be promoted from Formula Two to Formula One. He drove the No. 23 car, finishing fifteenth in the championship.

=== GT Racing ===
==== Back to Finland ====
In 2010, after failing to collect budget large enough to compete in F2, Karjalainen returned to Finland to drive for Ferrari Team Nurminen, which competed in GT Finnish Championship with Ferrari F430 Challenge GT3 Cup. This was the first time Karjalainen competed in GT-racing.

== Racing record ==
=== Complete Formula BMW ADAC results ===
(key) (Races in bold indicate pole position) (Races in italics indicate fastest lap)

Year	Entrant	1	2	3	4	5	6	7	8	9	10	11	12	13	14	15	16	17	18	19	20	DC	Points
2004	Matson Motorsport	HOC1; 1; 19	HOC1; 2; 20	ADR; 1; 17	ADR; 2; 21	NÜR1; 1; 16	NÜR1; 2; 20	LAU; 1; 19	LAU; 2; 20	NOR; 1; 19	NOR; 2; 20	NÜR2; 1; 24	NÜR2; 2; 21	OSC; 1 Ret	OSC; 2; 13	ZAN; 1; 21	ZAN; 2; 22	BRN; 1; 19	BRN; 2; 23	HOC2; 1; 16	HOC2; 2 Ret	24th	0
2005	Team Rosberg	HOC1; 1 Ret	HOC1; 2; 10	LAU; 1; 19	LAU; 2; 16	SPA; 1; 17	SPA; 2; 12	NÜR1; 1 Ret	NÜR1; 2; 10	BRN; 1; 15	BRN; 2; 15	OSC; 1; 12	OSC; 2; 15	NOR; 1; 14	NOR; 2; 14	NÜR2; 1; 19	NÜR2; 2 Ret	ZAN; 1; 15	ZAN; 2; 18	HOC2; 1; 8	HOC2; 2; 11	21st	5

=== Complete Asian Formula Renault Challenge results ===
(key) (Races in bold indicate pole position) (Races in italics indicate fastest lap)

Year	Entrant	1	2	3	4	5	6	7	8	9	10	11	12	DC	Points
2006	Asia Racing Team	SHA; 1; 7	SHA; 2; 3	ZHU; 1; 1	ZHU; 2; 2	ZHU; 11	SEP; 1; 5	SEP; 2; 5	SHA; 1; 6	SHA; 2; 5	SHA; 1; 5	SHA; 2 Ret	ZHU; 6	4th	173

=== Complete GP2 Series results ===
(key) (Races in bold indicate pole position) (Races in italics indicate fastest lap)

Year	Entrant	1	2	3	4	5	6	7	8	9	10	11	12	13	14	15	16	17	18	19	20	21	DC	Points
2007	BCN Competición	BHR; FEA	BHR; SPR	ESP; FEA	ESP; SPR	MON; FEA	FRA; FEA	FRA; SPR	GBR; FEA	GBR; SPR	EUR; FEA	EUR; SPR	HUN; FEA	HUN; SPR	TUR; FEA; Ret	TUR; SPR; Ret	ITA; FEA	ITA; SPR	BEL; FEA	BEL; SPR	VAL; FEA	VAL; SPR	NC	0

=== Complete Atlantic Championship Series results ===
(Races in bold indicate pole position) (Races in italics indicate fastest lap)

Year	Entrant	1	2	3	4	5	6	7	8	9	10	11	DC	Points
2008	Jensen Motorsport	LBH; 14	LS; 16	MON; Ret	EDM; 14	EDM; 11	ROA; Ret	ROA; 14	TRR; 10	NJ; 15	UT; 12	ATL	17th	70

=== Complete FIA Formula Two Championship results ===
(key) (Races in bold indicate pole position) (Races in italics indicate fastest lap)

Year	1	2	3	4	5	6	7	8	9	10	11	12	13	14	15	16	DC	Points
2009	VAL; 1; 17	VAL; 2; 15	BRN; 1; 4	BRN; 2; 16	SPA; 1; 7	SPA; 2; 15	BRH; 1; 11	BRH; 2; 18	DON; 1; 15	DON; 2; 13	OSC; 1 Ret	OSC; 2; 15	IMO; 1; 11	IMO; 2; 15	CAT; 1; 16	CAT; 2; 17	15th	7

=== Complete Formula Renault 2.0 NEC results ===
(key) (Races in bold indicate pole position) (Races in italics indicate fastest lap)

Year	Entrant	1	2	3	4	5	6	7	8	9	10	11	12	13	14	15	16	DC	Points
2009	Red Step Formula	ZAN; 1	ZAN; 2	HOC; 1	HOC; 2	ALA; 1; 7	ALA; 2; 4	OSC; 1	OSC; 2	ASS; 1	ASS; 2	MST; 1	MST; 2	NÜR; 1	NÜR; 2	SPA; 1	SPA; 2	23rd	31
