= Pietro Gandolfi =

Italian former racing driver (b. 1987)

- Nationality: (Italy) Italian
- Born: Pietro Aldo Gandolfi; April 21, 1987 (age 39) Parma (Italy)

FIA Formula Two Championship
- Starts: 16
- Wins: 0
- Poles: 0
- Fastest laps: 0
- Best finish: 27th in 2009

Previous series
- 2006 2007-2008: Formula Renault 2.0 Italy; Formule Renault 2.0 Suisse

Pietro Aldo Gandolfi (born April 21, 1987 in Parma) is an Italian former racing driver.

== Career ==
=== Formula Renault ===
Gandolfi began his racing career at the age of thirteen, competing in kart racing for four years. In 2004, he became a racing instructor at the Henry Morrogh Motor School in Perugia, driving a Formula Renault 1600 car for the first time as well at around this time.

In 2006, Gandolfi competed in five races of the Italian Formula Renault Championship. The following year he moved to the equivalent Swiss series, taking 21st position in the championship. He remained in the category for 2007, but slipped to 26th overall.

=== Formula Two ===
Gandolfi signed to drive for the relaunched FIA Formula Two Championship in 2009. He drove car number nine in the series, and finished 27th with no points. He has not raced since.

== Racing record ==
=== Career summary ===
Season	Series	Team name	Races	Poles	Wins	Points	Final Placing
2006	Formula Renault 2.0 Italy	BVM Minardi	5	0	0	0	NC
2007	Formule Renault 2.0 Suisse	Emmebi Motorsport	12	0	0	12	21st
2008	Formule Renault 2.0 Suisse	Emmebi Motorsport	11	0	0	6	26th
2009	FIA Formula Two Championship	MotorSport Vision	16	0	0	0	27th

=== Complete FIA Formula Two Championship results ===
(key) (Races in bold indicate pole position) (Races in italics indicate fastest lap)

Year	1	2	3	4	5	6	7	8	9	10	11	12	13	14	15	16	DC	Points
2009	VAL; 1; 20	VAL; 2; 22	BRN; 1 Ret	BRN; 2 Ret	SPA; 1; 14	SPA; 2; 17	BRH; 1; 18	BRH; 2 Ret	DON; 1 Ret	DON; 2; 15	OSC; 1 NC	OSC; 2; 22	IMO; 1 Ret	IMO; 2 Ret	CAT; 1 Ret	CAT; 2; 20	27th	0
