= Germán Sánchez (racing driver) =

Spanish racing driver (born 1989)

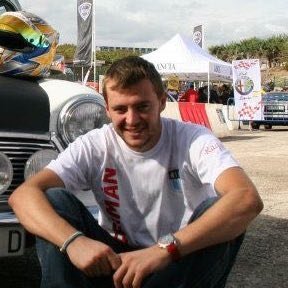
- Germán Sánchez Flor
- Nationality: (Spain) Spanish
- Born: Germán Sánchez Flor; 4 July 1989 (age 37) Alicante, Spain

FIA Formula Two Championship career
- Debut season: 2009
- Current team: MotorSport Vision
- Car number: 27
- Starts: 14
- Wins: 0
- Poles: 0
- Fastest laps: 0
- Best finish: 24th in 2009

Previous series
- 2006–08: Spanish F3

Championship titles
- 2008 2006: Spanish F3; Spanish F3 Copa de España

Germán Sánchez Flor (born 4 July 1989 in Alicante) is a Spanish former racing driver that competed in Formula Three and Two.

== Career ==
=== Formula Three ===
Sánchez made his car racing debut aged just sixteen, when he took part in the 2006 Spanish Formula Three Championship. Driving a Dallara F300 for Escuela Profiltek, Sánchez was also eligible for the secondary Copa de España as he was driving an older car than most other competitors. Sánchez won the Copa de España, winning seven of the fifteen races, with three other podium finishes. He also amassed seventeen points towards the main championship, and finished 13th overall. For the 2007 season, he moved to Campos Racing and the main championship. Sánchez finished fourth in the championship, scoring two wins at Albacete and Jerez, and scored two third-place finishes at Jerez and Barcelona.

Sánchez continued with Campos into the 2008 season. He won again at Albacete, and also won one of the first races to be held at the Valencia Street Circuit, in order for the circuit to acquire the licence that was required to host the European Grand Prix a month later. Further wins at Magny-Cours and the Circuit de Valencia helped him to edge out Nelson Panciatici for the title, despite a non-scoring finale in Barcelona.

=== Formula Two ===
2009 saw Sánchez move up to the FIA Formula Two Championship, driving car number 27. Despite missing the races in Barcelona, he finished 24th in the championship, with a pair of eighths at Imola.

== Racing record ==
=== Career summary ===
Season	Series	Team	Races	Wins	Poles	F/Laps	Podiums	Points	Position
**2006**	Spanish Formula Three Championship	Escuela Profiltek-Circuit	15	0	0	0	0	17	13th
**2006**	Spanish Formula Three Copa de España	Escuela Profiltek-Circuit	15	7	3	?	10	107	1st
**2007**	Spanish Formula Three Championship	Campos Racing	16	2	2	2	4	76	4th
**2008**	Spanish Formula Three Championship	Campos Racing	17	4	1	4	5	88	1st
**2009**	FIA Formula Two Championship	MotorSport Vision	14	0	0	0	0	2	24th

=== Complete FIA Formula Two Championship results ===
(key) (Races in bold indicate pole position) (Races in italics indicate fastest lap)

Year	1	2	3	4	5	6	7	8	9	10	11	12	13	14	15	16	DC	Points
2009	VAL; 1; 14	VAL; 2; 11	BRN; 1; 16	BRN; 2 Ret	SPA; 1; 12	SPA; 2 Ret	BRH; 1; 17	BRH; 2 Ret	DON; 1; 12	DON; 2; 11	OSC; 1 Ret	OSC; 2; 16	IMO; 1; 8	IMO; 2; 8	CAT; 1 DNS	CAT; 2 DNS	24th	2

Sporting positions
Preceded by Arturo Llobell	Spanish Formula Three; Copa de España; Champion; 2006	Succeeded by Christian Ebbesvik
Preceded by Máximo Cortés	Spanish Formula Three champion 2008	Succeeded by Bruno Méndez; European F3 Open; Sandy Stuvik; Spanish Formula Three
