= Tom Gladdis =

British racing driver (born 1991)

- Nationality: (United Kingdom) British
- Born: 24 February 1991 (age 35) Isle of Wight, England

FIA Formula Two Championship career
- Debut season: 2009
- Current team: MotorSport Vision
- Categorisation: FIA Silver
- Car number: 24
- Starts: 22
- Wins: 0
- Poles: 0
- Fastest laps: 0
- Best finish: 15th in 2010

Previous series
- 2008 2007 2007 2007: Star Mazda Championship; Formula BMW UK; Formula BMW Asia; Formula BMW ADAC

Tom Gladdis (born 24 February 1991 on the Isle of Wight) is a British racing driver, who competed in the FIA Formula Two Championship.

== Career ==
=== Formula BMW ===
Gladdis made his circuit racing debut in the Formula BMW UK series in 2007, after being one of five drivers selected for a scholarship. Competing for Nexa Racing, Gladdis ended up fourteenth in the championship, in its final season before being merged into Formula BMW Europe, with a solitary top-ten finish at Snetterton. Gladdis also competed in two rounds of the Formula BMW ADAC series for Team Zinner at Hockenheim, amassing eight points to finish 32nd in the championship, and sixteenth out of all rookies. He also competed in the pan-Asian series for Ao's Racing Team, as a team-mate to Sebastián Saavedra. To round off his season, he competed in the World Final in Valencia for Master Motorsport, finishing 23rd.

=== Star Mazda ===
After testing for Andersen Racing in late 2007, Gladdis signed for the team to contest the Star Mazda Championship for 2008. Gladdis finished sixth in the championship standings, amassing three fastest laps, two pole positions and a win at Portland International Raceway. He also finished second in the Portland double-header, and finished third at Mosport International Raceway.

=== Formula Two ===
2009 saw Gladdis move up to the FIA Formula Two Championship, driving car number 24. A sixth at Spa, and an eighth at Brno were Gladdis' only points-scoring races, eventually finishing 20th in the championship. Competing in only the two British and Czech rounds in the 2010, Gladdis achieved second place in the second Brands Hatch race; combined with a fifth place in the first race he scored 28 points, finishing 15th in the championship.

== Racing record ==
=== Career summary ===
Season	Series	Team	Races	Wins	Poles	F/Laps	Podiums	Points	Position
2007	Formula BMW UK	Nexa Racing	17	0	0	0	0	262	14th
2007	Formula BMW ADAC	Team Zinner	2	0	0	0	0	8	32nd
2007	Formula BMW Asia	Ao's Racing Team	4	0	0	0	0	0	NC†
2008	Star Mazda Championship	Andersen Racing	10	2	1	3	3	334	6th
2009	FIA Formula Two Championship	MotorSport Vision	16	0	0	0	0	4	20th
2010	FIA Formula Two Championship	MotorSport Vision	6	0	0	0	1	28	15th
2011	FIA Formula Two Championship	MotorSport Vision	2	0	0	0	0	1	24th
2012-13	MRF Challenge Formula 2000 Championship	MRF Racing	6	0	0	0	0	18	13th
2014	Radical European Masters	360	7	0	0	0	0	14	13th

† As Gladdis was a guest driver, he was ineligible for points.

==== Star Mazda Championship ====
Year	Team	1	2	3	4	5	6	7	8	9	10	11	12	Rank	Points
2008		SEB; 5	UTA; 5	WGI	POR; 1	POR; 2	ROA; 5	TRR; 8	MOS; 3	NJ1; 5	NJ2; 13	ATL; 8	LAG	**6th**	**334**

=== Complete FIA Formula Two Championship results ===
(key) (Races in bold indicate pole position) (Races in italics indicate fastest lap)

Year	1	2	3	4	5	6	7	8	9	10	11	12	13	14	15	16	17	18	Pos	Points
2009	VAL; 1; 19	VAL; 2; 18	BRN; 1; 8	BRN; 2; 10	SPA; 1; 6	SPA; 2 Ret	BRH; 1; 13	BRH; 2; 13	DON; 1; 17	DON; 2 Ret	OSC; 1; 16	OSC; 2; 17	IMO; 1; 16	IMO; 2; 13	CAT; 1; 14	CAT; 2; 15			20th	4
2010	SIL; 1 Ret	SIL; 2 Ret	MAR; 1	MAR; 2	MON; 1	MON; 2	ZOL; 1	ZOL; 2	ALG; 1	ALG; 2	BRH; 1; 5	BRH; 2; 2	BRN; 1; 12	BRN; 2; 12	OSC; 1	OSC; 2	VAL; 1	VAL; 2	15th	28
2011	SIL; 1; 10	SIL; 2; 15	MAG; 1	MAG; 2	SPA; 1	SPA; 2	NÜR; 1	NÜR; 2	BRH; 1	BRH; 2	SPL; 1	SPL; 2	MON; 1	MON; 2	CAT; 1	CAT; 2			24th	1
