= Sebastian Hohenthal =

Swedish racing driver

- Nationality: (Sweden) Swedish
- Born: Mica Sebastian Bogislaus Hohenthal; 5 November 1984 (age 42) Mora (Sweden)

Previous series
- 2001-2003 2001-2003 2003 2004 2005-2006 2006 2007-2008 2009: Formula Ford Zetec Nordic; Formula Ford Zetec Sweden; FFord Winter Series UK; Formula Ford Great Britain; Formula Renault 2.0 UK; Asian Formula Renault; British F3; FIA Formula Two Championship

Championship titles
- 2003 2003 2003 2006: Formula Ford Zetec Nordic; Formula Ford Zetec Sweden; FFord Winter Series UK; Formula Renault 2.0 UK

Mica Sebastian Bogislaus Hohenthal (born 5 November 1984 in Mora) is a former racing driver from Sweden.

== Career ==
=== Karting ===
Hohenthal competed in kart racing from 1995 to 2000. During this period, he won the Dalacupen Formula Micro in 1996, the Tom Trana Trophy ICA Junior in 1999, and both the Nordic and Swedish ICA Junior championships in 2000.

=== Formula Ford ===
Hohenthal stepped up to formula racing in 2001, driving in the local Nordic and Swedish Formula Ford championships. In 2003, driving for rally driver Stig Blomqvist's team, he won both titles. In the same year, he moved to the United Kingdom racing scene to drive for the Nexa Racing team. His first racing in this country was the British Formula Ford Championship's Winter Series, which he also won.

This was a precursor to a full-time entry in the main 2004 series, in which Hohenthal finished third in the championship. He also finished in this position in that year's Formula Ford Festival at the Brands Hatch circuit, setting fastest lap in the process.

=== Formula Renault ===
For 2005, Hohenthal moved up to the British Formula Renault Championship with the Fortec Motorsport team. He finished in fourth place in his first season in the category, and then returned to win the series in 2006, taking five pole positions and seven wins from the championship's twenty races in the course of doing so.

Hohenthal also competed in one round of the Asian Formula Renault Challenge in 2006, not scoring any points.

=== Formula Three ===
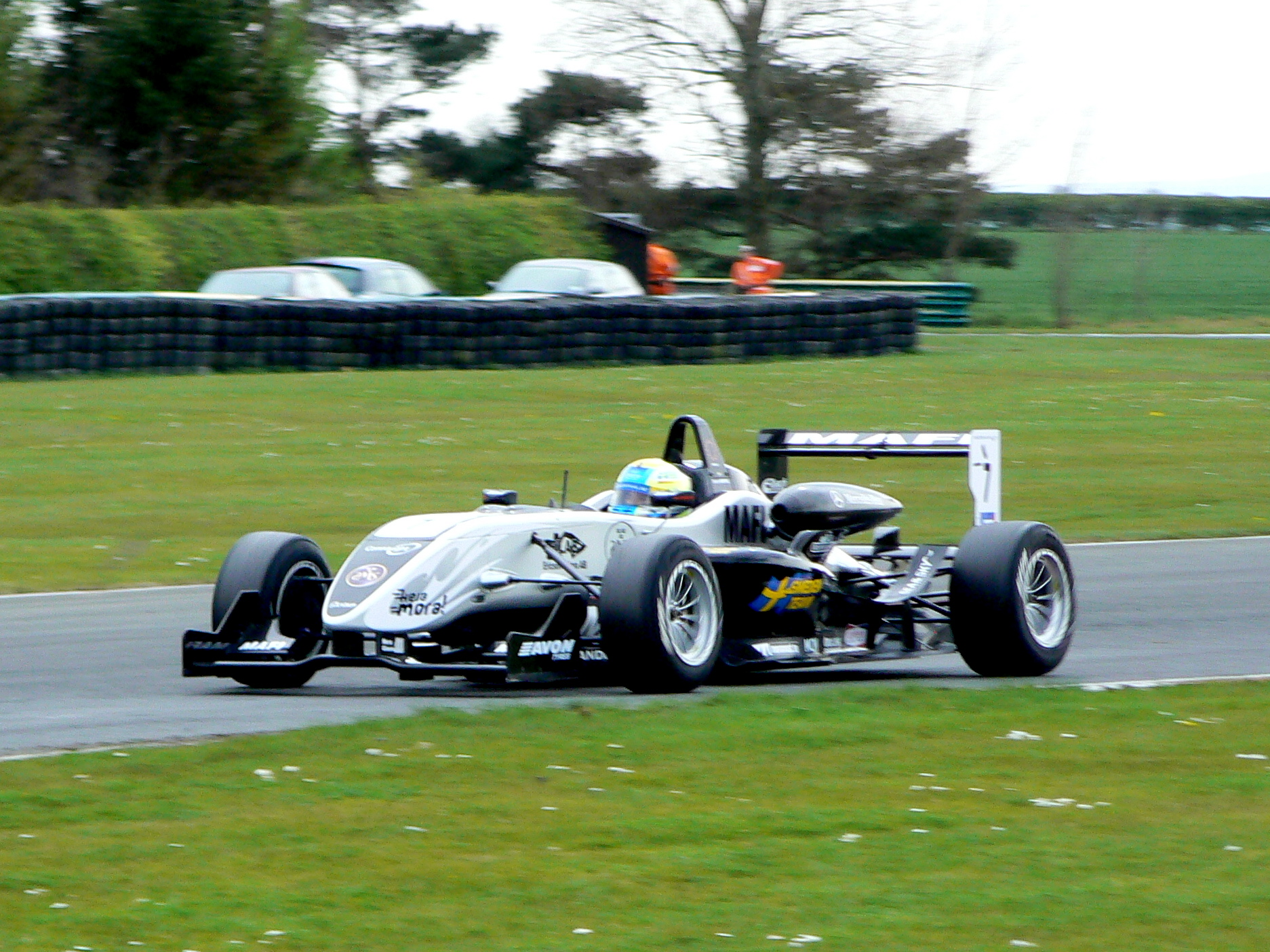
Hohenthal driving for Fortec Motorsport at the Croft round of the 2008 British Formula Three season.

Hohenthal continued his partnership with Fortec in the British Formula Three Championship for 2007, taking a win at Brands Hatch and a pole position at Thruxton en route to ninth place in the championship. He remained with Fortec in the championship for 2008 and won another race at Rockingham, but withdrew from the series after the Spa races, when it became apparent that he could not compete for the drivers' championship.

=== Formula Two ===
Hohenthal signed to drive for the relaunched FIA Formula Two Championship in 2009. He was aiming to emulate countryman Ronnie Peterson, who won the European F2 championship in 1971, and drove car number two. Sadly for Hohenthal, the results did not materialise as he only finished in the points twice – both races at Donington Park – as he finished sixteenth in the championship.

=== Retirement ===
After his disappointing Formula Two campaign, Hohenthal decided to retire from active driving, realizing that he would not be able to gather enough money to step up to Formula One or GP2, as he explained on his web site. He joined Hello Sweden, a company that supports young athletes and racing drivers, and set up his own Hohenthal Racing Academy which opened in May 2010.

== Racing record ==
=== Career summary ===
Season	Series	Team name	Races	Poles	Wins	Points	Position
2001	Formula Ford Zetec Nordic	Jan Lindblom Racing	8	?	0	130	**3rd**
2001	Formula Ford Zetec Sweden	Jan Lindblom Racing	?	?	?	39	10th
2002	Formula Ford Zetec Nordic	Eje Elgh Motorsport	?	?	?	20	8th
2002	Formula Ford Zetec Sweden	Försvarsmakten Racing	?	?	?	126	4th
2003	Formula Ford Zetec Nordic	Stig Blomqvist Motorsport	4	?	3	85	**1st**
2003	Formula Ford Zetec Sweden	Stig Blomqvist Motorsport	?	?	?	131	**1st**
2003	Formula Ford Winter Series UK	Nexa Racing	4	0	1	?	**1st**
2004	Formula Ford Great Britain	Nexa Racing	18	0	0	409	**3rd**
2004	Formula Ford Festival	Nexa Racing	1	0	0	N/A	**3rd**
2005	Formula Renault 2.0 UK	Fortec Motorsport	20	2	1	380	4th
2006	Formula Renault 2.0 UK	Fortec Motorsport	20	5	7	481	**1st**
2006	Asian Formula Renault Challenge	M3-Prema Formula Racing	1	0	0	0	NC
2007	British Formula Three Championship	Fortec Motorsport	22	1	1	101	9th
2008	British Formula Three Championship	Fortec Motorsport	16	0	1	105	7th
2009	FIA Formula Two Championship	MotorSport Vision	16	0	0	7	16th

=== Complete FIA Formula Two Championship results ===
(key) (Races in bold indicate pole position) (Races in italics indicate fastest lap)

Year	1	2	3	4	5	6	7	8	9	10	11	12	13	14	15	16	DC	Points
2009	VAL; 1; 10	VAL; 2; 13	BRN; 1 Ret	BRN; 2; 12	SPA; 1; 17	SPA; 2; 12	BRH; 1 Ret	BRH; 2; 14	DON; 1; 6	DON; 2; 5	OSC; 1; 17	OSC; 2; 9	IMO; 1; 9	IMO; 2; 12	CAT; 1 Ret	CAT; 2 Ret	16th	7

Sporting positions
Preceded by Oliver Jarvis	British Formula Renault; UK series champion 2006	Succeeded by Duncan Tappy
