= Nicola de Marco =

Italian racing driver

- Nationality: (Italy) Italian
- Born: 28 August 1990 (age 36) Pordenone (Italy)

FIA Formula Two Championship career
- Debut season: 2009
- Current team: MotorSport Vision
- Car number: 10
- Starts: 34
- Wins: 2
- Poles: 2
- Fastest laps: 3
- Best finish: 8th in 2010

Previous series
- 2008 2007 2006 2006: Spanish F3; Italian F3; Formula Azzurra; FR 2.0 Italia Winter Series

Nicola de Marco (born 28 August 1990 in Pordenone) is an Italian racing driver.

== Career ==
=== Formula Azzurra ===
After a six-year karting career, de Marco moved up to the Formula Azzurra championship with the Durango team in 2006, and was mightily impressive in his one and only Azzurra campaign. de Marco won three races en route to third in the championship, finishing behind Giuseppe Termine and fellow FIA Formula Two Championship racer Mirko Bortolotti.

De Marco also competed in the Formula Renault 2.0 Italia Winter Series, finishing joint ninth in the championship with Daniel Zampieri.

=== Formula Three ===
After only one year at a junior single-seater level, de Marco moved up to the Italian Formula Three Championship with Lucidi Motors, and finished the 2007 season with six podiums and a pole position at Vallelunga. He ended up sixth in the championship, but was outperformed by team-mate Paolo Maria Nocera, who would go on to lift the title.

A change to the Spanish Formula Three Championship for 2008 was hoped to see de Marco progress and earn more experience. Driving for the RP Motorsport team, de Marco won races at Spa and Albacete on his way to fourth in the championship, losing out on third to fellow F2 racer Natacha Gachnang by a solitary point.

=== Formula Two ===
De Marco drove in the relaunched FIA Formula Two Championship in 2009, driving car number 10 in the series. He finished in tenth position, with his best result coming in the final race at Circuit de Catalunya, where he finished second to Andy Soucek. He once again competed in the series in 2010, finishing eighth.

== Racing record ==
=== Career summary ===
| Season | Series | Team | Races | Wins | Poles | F/Laps | Podiums | Points | Position |
|---|---|---|---|---|---|---|---|---|---|
| 2006 | Formula Azzurra | Durango | 14 | 3 | 3 | 2 | 5 | 57 | **3rd** |
| 2006 | Formula Renault 2.0 Italy Winter Series | Durango | 4 | 0 | 0 | 0 | 0 | 50 | 9th |
| 2007 | Italian Formula Three Championship | Lucidi Motors | 16 | 0 | 1 | 1 | 6 | 67 | 6th |
| 2008 | Spanish Formula Three Championship | RP Motorsport | 17 | 2 | 0 | 0 | 3 | 75 | 4th |
| 2008 | Macau Grand Prix | RC Motorsport | 1 | 0 | 0 | 0 | 0 | N/A | 19th |
| 2009 | FIA Formula Two Championship | MotorSport Vision | 16 | 0 | 1 | 1 | 2 | 25 | 10th |
| 2010 | FIA Formula Two Championship | MotorSport Vision | 18 | 2 | 1 | 2 | 2 | 98 | 8th |
| 2013 | International GT Open - GTS | Kessel Racing | 10 | 0 | 0 | 0 | 3 | 28 | 15th |
| 2017 | Blancpain GT Series Sprint Cup | Orange 1 Team Lazarus | 2 | 0 | 0 | 0 | 0 | 0 | NC |
| 2019 | International GT Open | Lazarus Racing | 10 | 0 | 0 | 0 | 0 | 17 | 19th |
| 2026 | Italian GT Championship Endurance Cup - GT Cup | Rossocorsa | | | | | | | |

=== Complete FIA Formula Two Championship results ===
(key) (Races in bold indicate pole position) (Races in italics indicate fastest lap)

| Year | 1 | 2 | 3 | 4 | 5 | 6 | 7 | 8 | 9 | 10 | 11 | 12 | 13 | 14 | 15 | 16 | 17 | 18 | DC | Points |
|---|---|---|---|---|---|---|---|---|---|---|---|---|---|---|---|---|---|---|---|---|
| 2009 | VAL; 1; 9 | VAL; 2; 5 | **BRN**; **1**; 12 | BRN; 2; 3 | SPA; 1; 13 | SPA; 2; 10 | BRH; 1; 9 | BRH; 2 Ret | DON; 1 Ret | DON; 2 Ret | OSC; 1; 6 | OSC; 2; 5 | IMO; 1 Ret | IMO; 2; 9 | CAT; 1; 11 | CAT; 2; 2 | | | 10th | 25 |
| 2010 | SIL; 1; 9 | SIL; 2; 10 | MAR; 1 Ret | MAR; 2 Ret | MON; 1 Ret | MON; 2 Ret | ZOL; 1; 10 | ZOL; 2 Ret | ALG; 1; 5 | ALG; 2; 7 | BRH; 1; 7 | BRH; 2; 4 | BRN; 1; 1 | BRN; 2; 6 | OSC; 1; 9 | OSC; 2; 15 | **VAL**; **1**; 1 | VAL; 2 Ret | 8th | 98 |
