= Jens Höing =

German racing driver (born 1987)

- Nationality: German
- Born: Jens Höing-Schwarz; February 21, 1987 (age 39) Münster, West Germany

FIA Formula Two Championship career
- Debut season: 2009
- Current team: MotorSport Vision
- Car number: 20
- Starts: 16
- Wins: 0
- Poles: 0
- Fastest laps: 0
- Best finish: 26th in 2009

Previous series
- 2008 2005–07: German F3; Formula BMW ADAC

Jens Höing-Schwarz (born February 21, 1987, in Münster) is a German former racing driver.

== Career ==
=== Formula BMW ===
After a five-year karting career, Höing moved up into the Formula BMW ADAC championship via a scholarship. Driving for Team Rosberg, Höing scored two points in 2005, but stayed in the series for 2006, but changed teams to GU-Racing. He improved from 23rd in 2005 to 14th in 2006, but still didn't crack the higher echelons of the standings, only amassing thirteen points. A new points system was introduced in 2007, which meant that Höing scored over 200 points but yet remained in 14th place overall. He competed at the end of season World Final in Valencia in 2006, and finished in 18th place.

=== Formula Three ===
After his three seasons in FBMW, Höing moved up into the German Formula Three Championship in 2008 but continued with GU-Racing. Höing finished in the points once, at the Nürburgring as he came out in 17th in the championship.

=== Formula Two ===
Höing originally signed up to drive in the 2009 FIA Formula Two Championship, driving car number twenty. However, some contractual issues forced Höing to remove himself from the championship. Once they were rectified, Höing returned to the championship, and was also reinstated to his original car number, after Edoardo Piscopo had used it at the first group test at Snetterton. It also forced organisers MotorSport Vision to increase the field to 25. He finished 26th in the standings, with no points. Höing was frequently involved in racing incidents, failing to finish in ten of the sixteen races.

== Racing record ==
=== Career summary ===
Season	Series	Team	Races	Wins	Poles	F/Laps	Podiums	Points	Position
2005	Formula BMW ADAC	Team Rosberg	18	0	0	0	0	2	23rd
2006	Formula BMW ADAC	GU-Racing	18	0	0	0	0	11	14th
2006	Formula BMW World Final	GU-Racing	1	0	0	0	0	N/A	18th
2007	Formula BMW ADAC	GU-Racing	18	0	0	0	0	216	14th
2008	German Formula Three Championship	GU-Racing	12	0	0	0	0	1	17th
2009	FIA Formula Two Championship	MotorSport Vision	16	0	0	0	0	0	26th

=== Complete FIA Formula Two Championship results ===
(key) (Races in bold indicate pole position) (Races in italics indicate fastest lap)

Year	1	2	3	4	5	6	7	8	9	10	11	12	13	14	15	16	DC	Points
2009	VAL; 1; 18	VAL; 2; 21	BRN; 1 Ret	BRN; 2; 13	SPA; 1 Ret	SPA; 2; 16	BRH; 1 Ret	BRH; 2 Ret	DON; 1 Ret	DON; 2 Ret	OSC; 1 Ret	OSC; 2; 14	IMO; 1 Ret	IMO; 2 Ret	CAT; 1 Ret	CAT; 2; 21	26th	0
