= Jason Moore (racing driver) =

English racing driver (born 1988)

- Nationality: (United Kingdom) British
- Born: 10 October 1988 (age 38) Bedford, England

FIA Formula Two Championship career
- Debut season: 2009
- Current team: MotorSport Vision
- Car number: 31
- Starts: 15
- Wins: 0
- Poles: 0
- Fastest laps: 1
- Best finish: 22nd in 2009

Previous series
- 2007–08 2007: Formula Palmer Audi; FPA Autumn Trophy

Championship titles
- 2008: Formula Palmer Audi

Jason Moore (born 10 October 1988 in Bedford, England) is a motor racing driver.

== Career ==
=== Karting ===
Moore began his karting career in 2000 aged 11, with a campaign in the Super 1 National Cadet Championship. Moore finished 24th in the championship, with a best finish of tenth coming at Rowrah.

Moore then moved up to the Super 1 National Junior TKM Championship for three seasons. In 2001, he finished in a lowly 25th place in the championship, with his best finish of 15th coming at the final round at Buckmore Park. The 2002 season was far more successful, as he broke into the top-ten, eventually finishing in ninth place. A sixth place at Buckmore was his best result of the season. 2003 was his best season, as he ended up runner-up in the championship, just twenty points behind champion Lee Bell. Moore's season included wins at the first two rounds at Rowrah, and Kimbolton.

Moore stepped up another level to Intercontinental A Junior karts for the 2004 season. He ended up ninth in the championship, with a win at Lydd. Moore continued in the class in 2005, but did not compete in the whole season, pulling out after a troublesome weekend at Clay Pigeon. His best result was 22nd at Three Sisters. His final season of karting produced his only championship win, as he eased to a 21-point winning margin over Micky Higham in the 2006 Super 1 National Formula TKM Extreme Championship, despite only winning one main final at Fulbeck.

=== Formula Palmer Audi ===
Moore moved straight into the 450 bhp Formula Palmer Audi series for the 2007 season. He amassed five podiums in his debut season, including four third-place finishes en route to fifth in the championship. Moore continued his progress in the series, by committing to an Autumn Trophy campaign. He recorded his first podium in an FPA car, with a third during the opening race at Brands Hatch.

A second season followed in 2008, and saw Moore successfully claim the championship title. Moore claimed six wins, and finished on the podium a further eight times, as he edged out Tom Bradshaw by nine points. His championship success also saw him being nominated for the McLaren Autosport BRDC Award, but would eventually lose out to Alexander Sims.

=== Formula Two ===
2009 saw Moore move up to the FIA Formula Two Championship, driving car number 31. He scored three points en route to 22nd in the championship. He also set fastest lap in the first race at Circuit de Catalunya.

== Racing record ==
=== Career summary ===
Season	Series	Team	Races	Wins	Poles	F/Laps	Podiums	Points	Position
2007	Formula Palmer Audi	MotorSport Vision	20	0	0	?	5	251	5th
2007	Formula Palmer Audi Autumn Trophy	MotorSport Vision	6	0	0	0	1	79	5th
2007	Formula Palmer Audi Shootout	MotorSport Vision	3	0	0	0	0	25	10th
2008	Formula Palmer Audi	MotorSport Vision	20	6	5	5	14	360	**1st**
2009	FIA Formula Two Championship	MotorSport Vision	15	0	0	1	0	3	22nd

=== Complete FIA Formula Two Championship results ===
(key) (Races in bold indicate pole position) (Races in italics indicate fastest lap)

Year	1	2	3	4	5	6	7	8	9	10	11	12	13	14	15	16	DC	Points
2009	VAL; 1; 16	VAL; 2; 14	BRN; 1; 13	BRN; 2; 11	SPA; 1 Ret	SPA; 2 DNS	BRH; 1; 16	BRH; 2; 8	DON; 1; 11	DON; 2 Ret	OSC; 1; 14	OSC; 2; 20	IMO; 1; 18	IMO; 2; 7	CAT; 1; 19	CAT; 2; 16	22nd	3

Sporting positions
Preceded by Tim Bridgman	Formula Palmer Audi; Champion; 2008	Succeeded by Richard Plant
