= 2006 Formula Palmer Audi season =

2006 Formula Palmer Audi

Seasons
- ← 2005 2007 →

2006 was the ninth year of the Formula Palmer Audi open-wheel racing series. Briton Jon Barnes won the Championship, while American Dane Cameron took the Autumn Trophy

== 2006 Championship ==
The 2006 FPA Championship took in 15 rounds at six meetings. Brands Hatch was visited in both Indy and Grand Prix configurations, while Snetterton was added to the calendar and the series returned to Spa-Francorchamps. Two FIA GT Championship-supporting rounds at Dijon-Prenois in France and at Mugello in Italy concluded the season.

At the start of the season, Viktor Jensen, son of radio DJ David Jensen, romped away from the rest of the field, winning the first four races. But after that, having found his feet in his first year of open-wheel racing, Jon Barnes emerged as the dominant force, winning nine of the last 10 rounds to take the title with a race to spare. Barnes was nominated for the McLaren Autosport BRDC Award for his efforts throughout the season, breaking numerous FPA records such as most wins (nine), most consecutive wins (seven) and most points in a season (326).

2006 FPA Championship Schedule

Rounds	Date	Venue
1 and 2	May 20/21, 2006	(United Kingdom) Brands Hatch (GP)
3, 4 and 5	June 3/4, 2006	(Belgium) Spa-Francorchamps
6, 7 and 8	July 1/2, 2006	(United Kingdom) Brands Hatch (Indy)
9 and 10	July 15/16, 2006	(United Kingdom) Snetterton
11 and 12	September 2/3, 2006	(France) Dijon-Prenois
13, 14 and 15	September 16/17, 2006	(Italy) Mugello

== 2006 Championship Standings ==
Pos.	No.	Driver	Nat.	Total	1	2	3	4	5	6	7	8	9	10	11	12	13	14	15	Total
1	32	Jon Barnes	(United Kingdom)	326	20	20	16	18	16	24	24	20	24	24	24	24	24	24	24	326
2	8	Viktor Jensen	(Iceland)	276	24	24	24	24	18		20	24	20	20	15	10	20	15	18	276
3	21	Chris Hyman	(South Africa)	237	16	16	20	12	24	20	18	18	16	14	18	18	DNF	12	15	237
4	38	Giacomo Petrobelli	(Italy)	186	12	13	13	11	13	10	15	15	DNF	12	20	20	DNF	16	16	186
5	77	Tom Haines	(United Kingdom)	180	10	14	11	14	14	15	14	14	15	13	16	DNF	16	14	DNF	180
6	55	Chris Bell	(United Kingdom)	154	11	12	14	13	1	DNF	4	10	13	11	13	14	12	13	13	154
7	13	James Wingfield	(United Kingdom)	149	18	18	18	20	20	18	16	6	DNF	15						149
8	10	Paul Warren	(United Kingdom)	144	14	15	10	15	DNF	13	13	DNF	DNF	10	14	16	DNF	10	14	144
9	6	Derrick Collin	(United Kingdom)	128	1	7	9	9	7	9	6	12	10	5	10	13	11	7	12	128
10	4	Josh Southall	(United Kingdom)	103	9	DNF	15	6	12	16	11	DNF	18	16	DNF	DNF				103
11	12	Bruce Hodges	(United Kingdom)	101			12	DNF	10	12	12	16			11	15	13	DNF	DNF	101
12	19	Aaron Steele	(United Kingdom)	95	15	DNF	DNF	16	15	14	10	7	DNF	18						95
13	2	Giorgio Rosa	(Italy)	78	2	8	7	DNF	9	DNF	5	8			9	9	10	11	DNF	78
14	5	Wesley Fongenie	(United Kingdom)	72	0	4	DNF	7	11	DNF	3	DNF	DNF	8	8	11	9	DNF	11	72
15	7	Alan Kempson	(United Kingdom)	71	7	6	5	DNF	8	7	DNF	5	9	6	DNF	12	DNF	6	DNF	71
16	44	Mark Powell	(United Kingdom)	69	13	10				DNF	DNF	13	12	9	4	8				69
17	9	Bill Knowles	(United Kingdom)	60	5	DNF	8	10	2	8	DNF	DNF	11	4	12	DNF				60
18	3	Barry Walsh	(Republic of Ireland)	57	DNF	3	6	8	5	DNF	7	DNF	14	3	6	5	DNF	DNF	DNF	57
19	20	Niki Faulkner	(United Kingdom)	53													15	18	20	53
20	11	Tony Brewer	(United Kingdom)	46	3	5	DNF	4	4	5	DNF	DNF	7	DNF	7	6	DNF	5		46
21	23	Howard Spooner	(United Kingdom)	45	4	11				11	8	11								45
22	27	John Bell	(United Kingdom)	43						6	2	4	8	7			8	8	DNF	43
23	15	Adam Smith	(United Kingdom)	38													18	20	DNF	38
24	9	Stephen Young	(United Kingdom)	23													14	9	DNF	23
25	14	Stuart Prior	(United Kingdom)	15	6	9														15
26	12	Trevor Hyman	(South Africa)	9			3	3	3											9
27	12	Rob Lofting	(United Kingdom)	8	8	DNF														8
28	20	Ludovico Manfredi	(Italy)	0	0	2	4	5	6	4	9	9			5	7				0

Notes:

- 0 denotes a finish outside the points.
- DNF denotes a failure to finish.
- A blank space denotes a non-participation, i.e. did not start.
- **Bold** denotes race winner.
- Ludovico Manfredi was not eligible to score championship points due to licence issues. However, the points he would have scored (51 in total, enough for 20th in the final standings) are shown in the table.

== 2006 Autumn Trophy ==
The 2006 Autumn Trophy, held on consecutive weekends at Snetterton and Brands Hatch in early November, heralded the dawn of the next generation of young FPA stars. At Snetterton, 16-year-old T Cars star Luciano Bacheta proved to be a contender, winning his very first race in an open-wheel car, and following it up with a third place and another victory to lead the series at the half-way stage. Meanwhile, Team USA Scholarship driver Dane Cameron won the second race to remain just two points behind Bacheta.

At Brands Hatch, however, Cameron put in a stunning weekend performance on a track the Californian had never driven before, winning all three races to become the third American to claim the title. Bacheta had to settle for third in the series, as the consistent Aaron Steele took the runner-up spot by virtue of podium finishes in all six races.

The Autumn Trophy was also notable for the open-wheel racing debuts of Alex Brundle, son of former Formula One driver Martin Brundle, and Stefan Wilson, brother of ChampCar star and former FPA champion Justin Wilson.

2006 Autumn Trophy Schedule

Rounds	Date	Venue
1, 2 and 3	November 4/5	(United Kingdom) Snetterton
4, 5 and 6	November 11/12	(United Kingdom) Brands Hatch (Indy)

== 2006 Autumn Trophy Standings ==
Pos.	No.	Driver	Nat.	Total	1	2	3	4	5	6	Total
1	11	Dane Cameron	(United States)	136	20	24	20	24	24	24	136
2	19	Aaron Steele	(United Kingdom)	114	18	20	18	20	20	18	114
3	15	Luciano Bacheta	(United Kingdom)	102	24	18	24	4	16	16	102
4	21	Robert Podlesni	(United States)	98	10	16	16	18	18	20	98
5	8	Gino Ussi	(Europe)	76	6	15	14	16	11	14	76
6	20	Nigel Smith	(United Kingdom)	70	12	12	12	12	9	13	70
7	55	Chris Bell	(United Kingdom)	68	15	14	9	14	13	3	68
8	38	Giacomo Petrobelli	(Italy)	66	16	2	15	9	12	12	66
9	9	Stefan Wilson	(United Kingdom)	52	14	1	0	15	7	15	52
10	10	Paul Warren	(United Kingdom)	48	11	11	DNF	DNF	15	11	48
11	1	Stephen Young	(United Kingdom)	45	9	13	13	DNF	DNF	10	45
12	44	Mark Powell	(United Kingdom)	42	7	8	7	10	10	DNF	42
13	12	Bruce Hodges	(United Kingdom)	40	8	5	DNF	13	14	DNF	40
14	9	Derrick Collin	(United Kingdom)	39	3	3	5	11	8	9	39
15	3	Barry Walsh	(Republic of Ireland)	35	13	6	11	DNF	DNF	5	35
16	7	Alan Kempson	(United Kingdom)	33	4	9	8	8	DNF	4	33
17	4	Richard Plant	(United Kingdom)	31	2	DNF	10	6	6	7	31
18	88	Jeremy Preddy	(United States)	26	5	4	3	5	3	6	26
19	35	Steve Ross	(United Kingdom)	21	0	7	1	DNF	5	8	21
20	27	John Bell	(United Kingdom)	20	1	DNF	6	7	4	2	20
21	4	Alex Brundle	(United Kingdom)	14	0	10	4	DNF	DNF	DNF	14
22	50	Mark Higson	(United Kingdom)	3				DNF	2	1	3
23	50	Kirsty Jeffrey	(United Kingdom)	2	0	0	2				2

Notes:

- 0 denotes a finish outside the points.
- DNF denotes a failure to finish.
- A blank space denotes a non-participation, i.e. did not start.
- **Bold** denotes race winner.
