= Formula Palmer Audi =

- Former FPA logo, used up to 2008
- Category: Open-wheeled single seater
- Country: United Kingdom, mainland Europe
- Inaugural season: 1998
- Folded: 2010
- Teams: 1
- Engine suppliers: Audi 1.8 litre 4cyl 20v Turbo; 300 bhp, 360 bhp on overboost
- Tyre suppliers: Avon
- Last Drivers' champion: (United Kingdom) Nigel Moore
- Official website: FormulaPalmerAudi.com

Formula Palmer Audi, officially abbreviated to FPA, and sometimes informally abbreviated to Palmer Audi, was a one-make class of open wheel Formula racing founded in 1998 by former Formula One driver, Jonathan Palmer. It was based in the United Kingdom (UK), and was organised and operated by MotorSport Vision. It had a high proportion of British drivers and venues, but it also featured international drivers and races in mainland Europe.

The series was most famous for producing ex-F1 driver and IndyCar race-winner Justin Wilson, and triple World Touring Car Champion Andy Priaulx.

In November 2010, Jonathan Palmer announced the end of the series, with the series' chassis being dismantled for use in other areas of the MotorSport Vision organisation.

== Introduction ==
The series was originally set up as a cost-effective rival to Formula Three in the UK. After a brief foray into Europe, FPA evolved into a series predominantly for gentleman drivers looking to combine business with pleasure.

However, having produced nominees for the prestigious McLaren Autosport BRDC Award for five consecutive years from 2004 to 2008, including 2007 winner Stefan Wilson, FPA began to re-emerge as a viable option for young aspiring drivers on the path to Formula One. This was aided by scholarship deals that were announced between FPA and the Stars of Tomorrow karting programme, and between FPA and the FIA Formula Two Championship, which established a clear progression path for young drivers into top-level single seaters.

FPA used to promote itself as a cost-effective form of open wheel racing, with the 2009 season costing driver £55,000 plus VAT, whereas similar series such as Formula Renault or Formula BMW required estimated budgets two to three times higher in order to race with a front-running team.

FPA race weekend hospitality was provided on a par with FIA Formula Two Championship, and was able to accommodate 300 guests trackside.

== Race cars ==
Formula Palmer Audi car
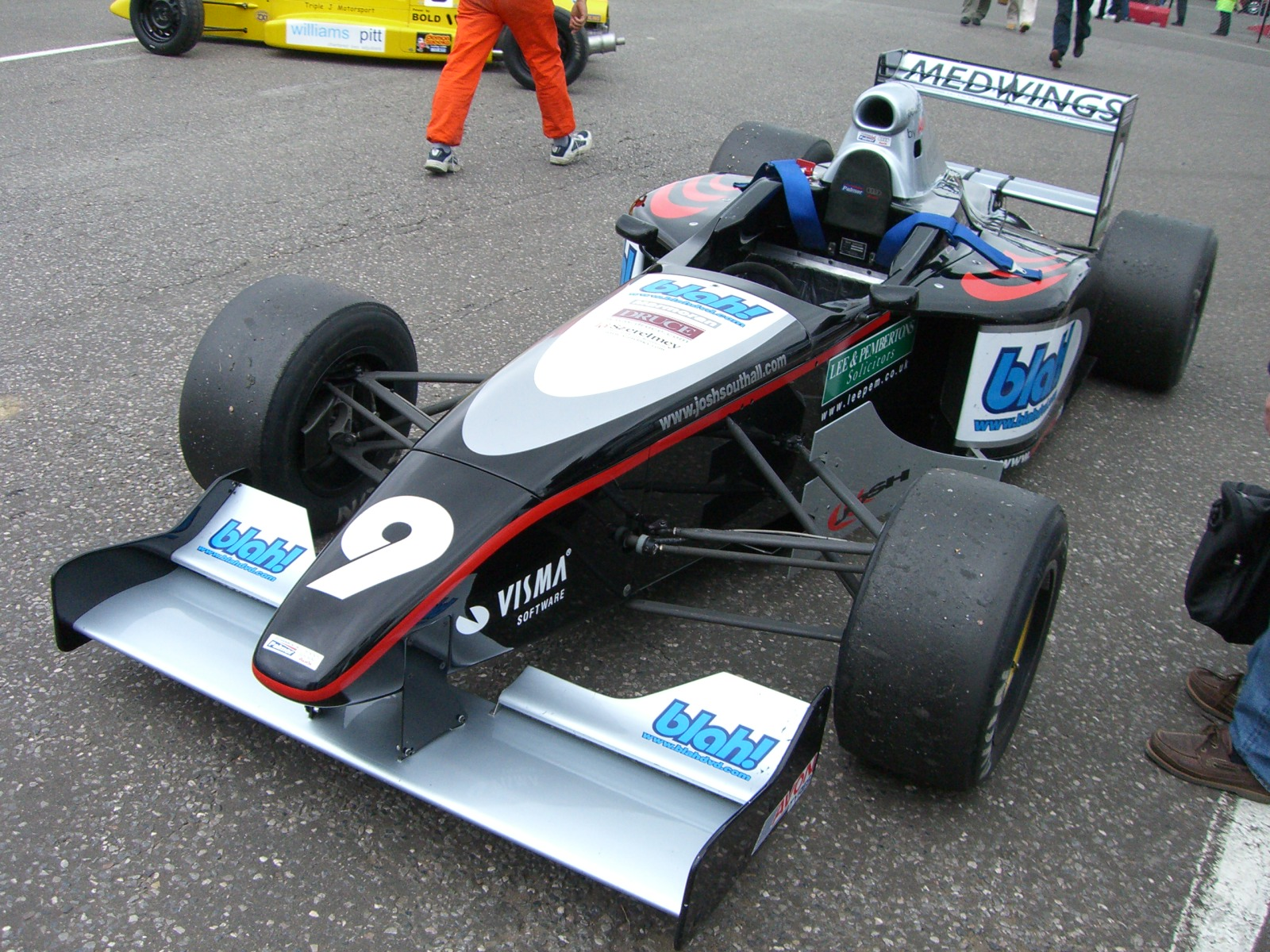

Overview
- Manufacturer: chassis: Van Diemen International, engine: Audi AG, prepared & built by Mountune Racing
- Production: 1998-present

Body and chassis
- Class: Open-wheeled single seat race car
- Body style: 1-seat aluminium honeycomb monocoque
- Layout: Longitudinal mid engine, rear-wheel drive

Powertrain
- Engine: Audi 1.8 litre 4cyl 20v Turbo
- Transmission: 5-speed Hewland FGC transaxle with LSD

Dimensions
- Wheelbase: 2,667 mm (105.0 in)
- Length: 4,390 mm (172.8 in)
- Width: 1,830 mm (72.0 in)
- Kerb weight: 530 kg (1,168 lb) (dry weight)

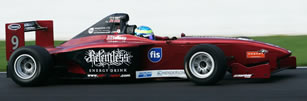
Emma Selway driving in the 2008 Formula Palmer Audi championship

Although each driver has their own personal sponsors and paint scheme on their car, all FPA cars were developed and tested, and are maintained and operated by Palmer Sport at their workshop at Bedford Autodrome. And although all cars are prepared for each race weekend in an identical manner, each drivers' car has their own personal mechanic in order to tailor their own personal set-up preferences. The cars operate with an identical weight, with lighter drivers carrying more ballast weight to counter heavier drivers. The telemetry for each car is provided by a Stack data logging system which monitors major parameters of engine operation and G-force, this data can be overlaid post-test/qualify/race sessions with fastest times to evaluate drivers individual performance.

The FPA race car is a true 'slicks and wings' package. It uses a custom-developed Avon slick tyre and 13-inch wheels, with 'wet' Avon race tyres also being available. Aerodynamics are assisted with fully adjustable front and rear wings, along with a stepped floor and rear diffuser.

=== Powertrain ===
As indicated by the name of the championship, there is a professional agreement with Audi AG. The cars are powered by a 300 brake horsepower (224 kW; 304 PS) Audi 1.8-litre, inline four cylinder 20-valve double overhead camshaft turbocharged production petrol engine. Prepared and built by Mountune Racing, the engine also features a driver-operated turbo 'boost' button, which temporarily gives the car a 60 brake horsepower (45 kW; 61 PS) increase. This engine can achieve a 0 to 100 kilometres per hour (0.0 to 62.1 mph) in 2.8 seconds, 0 to 160 kilometres per hour (0.0 to 99.4 mph) in 6.2 seconds, and is capable of propelling the cars to over 270 kilometres per hour (168 mph). Further engine detail includes a Pi Research Pectel motorsport electronic engine control unit and a Garrett T34 turbocharger with an intercooler. Like virtually all 'Formula' cars, the internal combustion engine is mid-mounted behind the driver, and is orientated longitudinally.

The transmission is a magnesium-cased Hewland FGC five-speed transaxle, which includes a limited-slip differential.

=== Chassis ===
The chassis and body is made of aluminium honeycomb monocoque, the basic structure of which complies with the current FIA Formula Three safety regulations. The car was manufactured by, and based on an original design by Van Diemen International.

=== Suspension & brakes ===
The FPA cars feature fully independent suspension based on a double wishbone design, with geometry which includes anti-squat and anti-dive pushrod operation. Ohlins two-way adjustable dampers, along with adjustable anti-roll bars complete the suspension system.

The brakes feature disc brakes all round, with four-piston calipers and radially ventilated and floating discs. A cockpit sited driver adjustable brake bias control is also included.

== FPA race weekend ==
FPA race weekends normally take place over two days, but may be spread over three if the series is supporting an international event such as A1 Grand Prix, Deutsche Tourenwagen Masters or the World Touring Car Championship. After free practice, drivers take part in two 20-minute qualifying sessions, for which they have an unlimited number of laps at their disposal. The first qualifying session sets the grid for Race 1, while the second sets the grid for Race 2.

Races are 35 miles (56 km) in length, with a time limit of 30 minutes. In the event of three races being held over a weekend, each driver's fastest lap from Race 2 counts at their qualifying time for Race 3.

Points are awarded to the first 19 finishers of each race in the following order:

Position	1st	2nd	3rd	4th	5th	6th	7th	8th	9th	10th	11th	12th	13th	14th	15th	16th	17th	18th	19th
Points	24	20	18	16	15	14	13	12	11	10	9	8	7	6	5	4	3	2	1

Drivers must take the chequered flag to score points. Retirees do not score, even if fewer than 19 drivers finish the race.

Another interesting feature is that each driver is supplied with just one set of slick Avon tyres to last them for the entire weekend of practice, qualifying and racing. While tyres may be replaced in the event of puncture, extensive damage or safety issues, any 'flat-spotting' of tyres done by a driver is not sufficient for an exchange.

== Features of Formula Palmer Audi ==
Formula Palmer Audi has always been run as an 'arrive-and-drive' series, and was one of the first major motor-racing series to do so. In order to keep a level playing field as much as possible, all the cars are run by a specialist team of FPA mechanics, rather than having separate teams. This concept of a large group of deliberately equalised cars has since been adopted by A1 Grand Prix.

The series has raced on many different circuits in the UK and Europe throughout its ten-year history. These include the following:

- (United Kingdom) Oulton Park (1998, 2000, 2004–2005, 2007–2010)
- (United Kingdom) Croft Circuit (1998, 2002, 2007, 2010)
- (United Kingdom) Snetterton Motor Racing Circuit (1998–2003, 2006–2010)
- (United Kingdom) Brands Hatch (1998–2010)
- (United Kingdom) Donington Park (1998–2002, 2007–2008)
- (United Kingdom) Pembrey Circuit (1998)
- (United Kingdom) Silverstone Circuit (1998–2000, 2002–2005, 2007–2010)
- (United Kingdom) Thruxton Circuit (1998–1999)
- (Republic of Ireland) Mondello Park (1999, 2001)
- (Belgium) Circuit de Spa-Francorchamps (2000, 2003–2006, 2008)
- (Germany) Nürburgring (2000, 2004)
- (France) Circuit de Nevers Magny-Cours (2000)
- (United Kingdom) Castle Combe Circuit (2002–2003, 2007)
- (Italy) Monza Circuit (2003–2005)
- (France) Dijon-Prenois (2006)
- (Italy) Mugello Circuit (2006)
- (United Kingdom) Rockingham Motor Speedway (2010)

FPA championships are also known for close title battles. In 2004, Jonathan Kennard beat Rob Jenkinson to the series title by just two points. The following year, Joe Tandy and David Epton finished tied on points, with Tandy winning the championship courtesy of having won more races over the course of the season.

The 2009 season consisted of 20 races at seven circuits. The championship winning driver receives a £50,000 scholarship prize intended to help with entry into the next level FIA Formula Two Championship. Furthermore, the top three championship drivers all receive an official Formula Two test.

== Autumn Trophy ==
After each FPA season, a mini-series known as the Autumn Trophy is held in early November. Originally called the Winter Series, it involved two meetings of three races each, held at different UK circuits on consecutive weekends - often Brands Hatch and Snetterton.

The Autumn Trophy often features the Team USA Scholarship, a programme set up by Champ Car journalist and commentator Jeremy Shaw to allow promising young American drivers the chance to gain experience of European racing. Originally designed to send American drivers to the Formula Ford Festival, drivers such as Jimmy Vasser, Phil Giebler, A. J. Allmendinger and J. R. Hildebrand have taken part in the Scholarship.

In 2007, a new feature was introduced to the Autumn Trophy - the FPA Shootout. This was a separate competition within the second weekend of the Autumn Trophy at Snetterton where the driver that accumulated the most points from two out of the weekend's three races received automatic nomination for the McLaren Autosport BRDC Award. In 2007, the FPA Shootout winner was Nick Tandy.

== FPA on TV ==
In its last seasons, Formula Palmer Audi was broadcast on Motors TV, a pan-European subscription satellite station. Highlights and interviews are shown as part of a 30-minute programme. For the Championship, each programme covered one race, while the Autumn Trophy featured two races to each programme. Up until the end of the 2006 Championship, the programmes were presented by radio DJ and former Top of the Pops presenter David Jensen. For the 2006 Autumn Trophy, the format was changed to a presenter-less magazine-type format, as David's son Viktor Jensen had stopped racing in FPA. All the races are commentated on by David Addison.

== Champions ==
Season	Champion	Runner-up	Third	Autumn Trophy/Winter Series
1998	(United Kingdom) Justin Wilson	(United Kingdom) Darren Turner	(United Kingdom) Richard Tarling	(United Kingdom) Derek Hayes
1999	(United Kingdom) Richard Tarling	(United Kingdom) Richard Lyons	(Republic of Ireland) Damien Faulkner	(United States) Paul Edwards
2000	(Republic of Ireland) Damien Faulkner	(United Kingdom) Justin Keen	(United Kingdom) Robbie Kerr	(United States) Philip Giebler
2001	(United Kingdom) Steve Warburton	(United Kingdom) Stephen Young	(United Kingdom) Gideon Cresswell	
2002	(United Kingdom) Adrian Willmott	(United States) Joel Nelson	(Russia) Roman Rusinov	(United Kingdom) Ben Lewis
2003	(United Kingdom) Ryan Lewis	(United Kingdom) Adam Smith	(United Kingdom) Ryan Hooker	(United Kingdom) Jonathan Kennard
2004	(United Kingdom) Jonathan Kennard	(United Kingdom) Rob Jenkinson	(Saudi Arabia) Karim Ojjeh	(United Kingdom) Stephen Young
2005	(United Kingdom) Joe Tandy	(United Kingdom) David Epton	(United Kingdom) Stuart Prior	(United Kingdom) Josh Weber
2006	(United Kingdom) Jon Barnes	(Iceland) Viktor Jensen	(South Africa) Chris Hyman	(United States) Dane Cameron
2007	(United Kingdom) Tim Bridgman	(United Kingdom) Stefan Wilson	(United Kingdom) Luciano Bacheta	(United Kingdom) Richard Keen
2008	(United Kingdom) Jason Moore	(United Kingdom) Tom Bradshaw	(United Kingdom) Jolyon Palmer	(Republic of Ireland) Niall Quinn
2009	(United Kingdom) Richard Plant	(Lithuania) Kazim Vasiliauskas	(United Kingdom) Adam Foster	
2010	(United Kingdom) Nigel Moore	(France) Maxime Jousse	(Spain) Ramón Piñeiro	

== Notable FPA drivers ==
Many famous names in top-level motorsport have taken part in FPA on their way to the top. These include the following:

Driver	Major Achievements
(United Kingdom) Jon Barnes	2008 British GT Champion, FIA GT3 driver
(Netherlands) Jeroen Bleekemolen	A1 Team The Netherlands driver, Deutsche Tourenwagen Masters driver, Porsche Supercup Champion 2008, 2009
(United Kingdom) Adam Carroll	GP2 Series driver, Deutsche Tourenwagen Masters driver, A1 Team Ireland driver
(France) Romain Dumas	24 Hours of Le Mans driver, ALMS driver
(United States) Phil Giebler	A1 Team USA driver, Indianapolis 500 Rookie of the Year
(United Kingdom) Rob Huff	World Touring Car Championship champion 2012, SEAT Cupra Championship driver
(United Kingdom) James Jakes	F3 Euroseries driver, British F3 driver, IndyCar driver
(Australia) Christian Jones	A1 Team Australia and Asian F3 Champion
(United Kingdom) Robbie Kerr	A1 Team Great Britain driver, Formula Renault 3.5 Series driver
(United Kingdom) Richard Lyons	Formula Nippon Champion 2004, A1 Team Ireland driver
(United Kingdom) Gary Paffett	Deutsche Tourenwagen Masters Champion 2005,2018, McLaren F1 test driver
(United Kingdom) Jolyon Palmer	2014 GP2 Series champion, Renault F1 driver
(Italy) Giorgio Pantano	Formula One driver, GP2 Champion 2008
(United Kingdom) Andy Priaulx	World Touring Car Championship Champion 2005, 2006, 2007
(Russia) Roman Rusinov	Midland F1 Racing test driver, 24 Hours of Le Mans driver
(United Kingdom) Darren Turner	24 Hours of Le Mans driver, BTCC driver
(United Kingdom) Danny Watts	Le Mans Series driver, A1GP driver
(United Kingdom) Justin Wilson	Formula One, Champ Car and IndyCar
(Sweden) Björn Wirdheim	Formula 3000 Champion 2003, Champ Car driver
(United States) Roger Yasukawa	IndyCar driver

== Notable FPA records ==
The following records apply only to Formula Palmer Audi Championship races, and not the Formula Palmer Audi Autumn Trophy.

- Most wins - Jon Barnes (nine)
- Most wins in a season - Jon Barnes (nine)
- Most consecutive wins - Jon Barnes (seven) (2006)
- Most pole positions in a season - Jonathan Kennard (10) (2004)
- Most points scored in a season - 360 Tim Bridgman, 2007; Jason Moore, 2008
- Most consecutive pole positions - Jonathan Kennard (six) (2004)

== See also ==
- FIA Formula Two Championship - FPA 'next tier' championship operated by MotorSportVision
