= Cusick Motorsports =

IndyCar Series team

Cusick Morgan Motorsports
- Base: Thermal, California
- Series: IndyCar Series; Indy NXT
- Race drivers: IndyCar: 23. (United States) Conor Daly; 24. (United Kingdom) Jack Harvey; Indy NXT; 15. (Australia) Nicolas Stati; 68. (United States) Juan Manuel Correa
- Manufacturer: Chevrolet

Career
- Debut: IndyCar: 2021 Indianapolis 500
- Latest race: IndyCar: 2025 Indianapolis 500
- Indy 500 victories: 0
- Race victories: IndyCar: 0 Indy NXT: 0
- Pole positions: IndyCar: 0 Indy NXT: 0

Cusick Morgan Motorsports is an American auto racing organization competing in the NTT IndyCar Series and Indy NXT. They have previously competed in the IMSA and the IMSA SportsCar Championship.

Past Cusick Morgan Motorsports entrants have had Stefan Wilson, in conjunction with DragonSpeed and A. J. Foyt Enterprises. In IMSA past entries included the #99 Porsche 911 GT3 R for Rob Ferriol, Katherine Legge, Wilson and Nick Boulle, in conjunction with Team Hardpoint.

== History ==
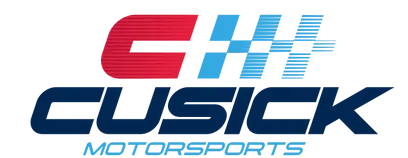
Cusick Motorsports logo (2021–2025)

=== IndyCar Series ===
==== 2021 ====
The team would first begin to compete in 2021, with Wilson driving the No. 25 Lohla Sport Dallara-Honda HI12TT/R at the Indianapolis 500. The entry would be fielded in conjunction with Andretti Autosport.

Wilson would successfully qualify for the race at a four-lap average speed of 229.714 miles per hour, which would put him in the 29th place starting position. On lap 34, Wilson would crash out in the pit lane, causing him to retire, with 32 laps complete, in 33rd (last) place. Wilson stated that the crash was due to the brakes locking as he slowed his car to meet the pit lane speed limit.

==== 2022 ====
Cusick returned in 2022 with Wilson driving at Indianapolis in the No. 25 Gnarly Jerky/Lohala Sport/Sierra Pacific Windows Dallara-Chevrolet. The entry was done in conjunction with DragonSpeed (who provided the pit crew members) and Foyt (who provided the equipment).

For qualifying, Wilson did not make an attempt, due to his engine having an issue stemming from the second gear being where the third was supposed to be, meaning that when Wilson shifted to what was supposed the third gear, the engine spun beyond its threshold. In the race, Wilson started 33rd (last) and would ultimately finish (two laps down) in 26th place.

==== 2024 ====
For the 2024 Indianapolis 500, Dreyer & Reinbold Racing partnered with Cusick Motorsports to field Conor Daly in the No. 24 and Ryan Hunter-Reay in the No. 23.

==== 2025 ====
In 2025 the partnership continued with Dreyer & Reinbold Racing, with Hunter-Reay returning to the No. 23 and Jack Harvey driving the No. 24.

=== IMSA SportsCar Championship ===
==== 2022 ====
In 2022, Cusick expanded their operations to IMSA. In a partnership with Hardpoint, the team would field the No. 99 Grid Rival Porsche in the Grand Touring Daytona (GTD) class. Cusick's involvement would only be for the endurance races, where Wilson would race.

At the 24 Hours of Daytona, Wilson joined Ferriol, Legge and Boulle. The car would start in 53rd and complete 672 of 761 laps, causing them to finish in 38th place overall and tenth (out of 24 cars) class.

Then, at the 12 Hours of Sebring, Legge, Wilson and Ferriol drove the car. They qualified in 52nd place (out of 53 cars) and would improve their finish, from Daytona, to eighth in class and 33rd overall.
