= 2007 Formula Palmer Audi season =

Motorsport season

2007 Formula Palmer Audi

Seasons
- ← 2006 2008 →

2007 saw the 10th season of the Formula Palmer Audi open wheel racing series, contested over 20 races between 7 April and 23 September. The championship was won by Tim Bridgman in his first Palmer Audi season.

== Championship ==
For 2007, Formula Palmer Audi underwent a change in its target market, focusing primarily on young aspiring Formula One drivers rather than affluent businessmen. Of the 22 drivers in the field for each round, 16 were "career drivers", with a group of around six "gentleman drivers" remaining. The number of races increased from 15 in 2006 to 20, the number of meetings increasing from six to eight. Despite this 33 per cent increase, the cost of competing in the series was reduced, the advertised price of £55,000 plus VAT being a reduction of nearly £3,000 on the 2006 season.

The race calendar for 2007, while expanded, did not feature any meetings outside of the UK. However, FPA continues to support large international events at Brands Hatch such as A1 Grand Prix and DTM.

== Race calendar ==
Round	Date	Circuit	Laps	Pole position	Winner
1	7 April	Silverstone (National)	22	Matthew Hamilton	Matthew Hamilton
2	7 April	Silverstone (National)	22	Matthew Hamilton	Luciano Bacheta
3	28 April	Brands Hatch (Grand Prix)	16	Tim Bridgman	Tim Bridgman
4	28 April	Brands Hatch (Grand Prix)	16	Tim Bridgman	Stefan Wilson
5	29 April	Brands Hatch (Grand Prix)	16	Tim Bridgman	Luciano Bacheta
6	13 May	Snetterton	16	Luciano Bacheta	Luciano Bacheta
7	13 May	Snetterton	18	Jack Clarke	Tim Bridgman
8	13 May	Snetterton	18	Tom Bradshaw	Tim Bridgman
9	9 June	Brands Hatch (Indy)	30	Jolyon Palmer	Jolyon Palmer
10	10 June	Brands Hatch (Indy)	30	Tim Bridgman	Tim Bridgman
11	10 June	Brands Hatch (Indy)	30	Tim Bridgman	Jack Clarke
12	15 July	Castle Combe	19	Jack Clarke	Tim Bridgman
13	15 July	Castle Combe	9	Tom Bradshaw	Stefan Wilson
14	11 August	Oulton Park (International)	13	Stefan Wilson	Stefan Wilson
15	11 August	Oulton Park (International)	13	Stefan Wilson	Jolyon Palmer
16	2 September	Donington Park (National)	16	Tim Bridgman	Tim Bridgman
17	2 September	Donington Park (National)	18	Stefan Wilson	Stefan Wiison
18	22 September	Croft	17	Luciano Bacheta	Luciano Bacheta
19	23 September	Croft	17	Luciano Bacheta	Jack Clarke
20	23 September	Croft	17	Stefan Wilson	Tom Bradshaw

== 2007 events ==
=== Silverstone (6/7 April) ===
The season began at Silverstone on Easter Saturday, with a pair of 22-lap races scheduled for the 1.6-mile National circuit. Series newcomer Matthew Hamilton took both pole positions after topping the two qualifying sessions on Saturday morning, having come out on top of a bizarre tiebreak in the second session. Both Hamilton and Luciano Bacheta set identical fastest times of 55.328 seconds. Hamilton was awarded pole having set the time before Bacheta did.

Bacheta took the lead at the start of Round 1 with Hamilton slotting into second. They would be forced to hold station for the opening laps as the safety car was deployed for a collision between Jack Clarke and Andreas Demetriou at Becketts. At the restart on lap seven, Bacheta held off Hamilton, but was passed by him down the National Straight half a lap later. Hamilton went on to win the race by around two seconds, with Jason Moore taking a podium in his first-ever car race, holding off more experienced drivers Dominik Jackson and Tim Bridgman on the final lap to take third.

The start of Round 2 was marred by a serious crash at the startline. A fast-changing red starting light caused some drivers to miss the start, including polesitter Hamilton who was then hit from behind by numerous other cars as they charged off the grid around Woodcote Bend. Hamilton was extracted from the cockpit and airlifted to hospital in Coventry with a broken right femur. After a delay of around an hour, the race restarted with Bacheta leading away Clarke, who then assumed the lead on lap three. On lap six Clarke spun at Luffield and resumed in sixth (where he would finish the race), leaving Bacheta to take the victory. Stefan Wilson and Moore charged through the field to take second and third respectively.

=== Brands Hatch GP (27–29 April) ===
Rounds 3, 4 and 5 of the season took place on the Brands Hatch Grand Prix circuit in Kent, where a trio of 16-lap races on the 2.3-mile track would support the final round of A1GP's second season.

Friday's qualifying sessions for the first two races of the weekend saw Jolyon Palmer and Tim Bridgman take the pole positions, with points leader Luciano Bacheta having to settle for a pair of fourths. In Saturday morning's first race (Round 3), Bridgman took the lead from the start and pulled away to take his first victory of the season. Behind, Palmer's challenge for a first podium of 2007 ended with a crash at Surtees. Bacheta took second, with Giacomo Petrobelli in third after withstanding pressure from Dominik Jackson in the closing laps.

In Round 4 on Saturday afternoon, Bridgman held first place from the start, while Stefan Wilson kept his second-place grid position as he stayed in touch with the leader. Late in the race, Wilson started to reel in Bridgman, using his turbo boost to pass him on lap 13, and going on to take his first car racing win at only his 10th attempt. Bacheta took third, ahead of Palmer.

Round 5 took place on Sunday, with Palmer being awarded pole position for setting the fastest lap over the previous day's races. Once again, Palmer lost the lead at the start, Bacheta hitting the front to take his second win of the campaign. Palmer spent the latter stages of the race trying to hold off Bridgman, who made it past at Paddock Hill Bend on the penultimate lap, only for Palmer to dive up the inside at Pilgrim's Drop half a lap later to reclaim the position.

=== Snetterton (11–13 May) ===
Rounds 6, 7 and 8 took place at Snetterton in Norfolk. In qualifying, Luciano Bacheta and Jack Clarke both took their first pole positions of the season in overcast conditions, although Bacheta could only manage fifth on the grid for the second race. Tim Bridgman would start both races from second.

Sunday's race day, the only day all season to include three races, was marred by changeable weather conditions. Round 6 was held in light rain, with Bridgman making the best start to take the lead and pull away from Bacheta. Further back, Tom Bradshaw was scything through the field and catching Bacheta quickly in the latter stages. Then, Bridgman spun on the 16th lap of 18 at Russell chicane, allowing Bacheta and Bradshaw through to fight for the victory. That fight never materialised, a red flag being thrown on the last lap for a spinning backmarker at the Esses, ensuring Bacheta's third win of the season from Bradshaw and Bridgman.

A break in the rain shortly before Round 7 caused the field to make last-minute changes to slick tyres. Once again, Bridgman made the best start from second, and made up for his earlier mistake by leading all the way to victory. Bacheta, meanwhile, suffered his first retirement of the season, tangling with polesitter Clarke at the Esses on the opening lap while fighting for second. Tom Bradshaw inherited second and held it to the end, securing pole for the Round 8 in the process with fastest lap, while Stefan Wilson came out on top of a battle with friend Richard Plant for third.

Round 8 was held in torrential rain, with the first three laps run behind the safety car at slow speed. When the race finally got underway with a rolling start, poleman Bradshaw left the door open for Bridgman at Riches, who made a robust move to take the lead. Bradshaw ran out of road, spinning on to the grass, although he later rejoined to finish 12th. Bridgman cruised from then on to a 10-second victory over Stefan Wilson, with Richard Kent securing his first car racing podium in third. For Bacheta, the race was much more eventful as he fought his way up from 19th on the grid to finish fifth. This meant he held on to his championship lead by just two points from Bridgman, with Wilson another three further back.

== Championship standings ==
Pos.	Driver	Nat.	Points	Wins	Podiums	Poles
1	Tim Bridgman	(United Kingdom)	360	6	14	6
2	Stefan Wilson	(United Kingdom)	332	4	9	4
3	Luciano Bacheta	(United Kingdom)	303	4	9	3
4	Jack Clarke	(United Kingdom)	253	2	7	2
5	Jason Moore	(United Kingdom)	251		5	
6	Tom Bradshaw	(United Kingdom)	233	1	5	2
7	Richard Kent	(United Kingdom)	208		2	
8	Richard Plant	(United Kingdom)	196			
9	Chris Chubb	(United Kingdom)	191			
10	Jolyon Palmer	(United Kingdom)	187	2	4	1
11	Alex Brundle	(United Kingdom)	160			
12	Matthew Hamilton	(United Kingdom)	157	1	4	2
13	Chris Bell	(United Kingdom)	147			
14	Nik Iruwan	(Malaysia)	127			
15	Ivan Lukashevich	(Russia)	155			
16	Dominik Jackson	(United Kingdom)	88			
17	Mark Powell	(United Kingdom)	87			
18	Derrick Collin	(United Kingdom)	76			
19	Max Snegirev	(Russia)	74			
20	Jeremy Preddy	(United Kingdom)	66			
21	Doros Loucaides	(Cyprus)	65			
22	Giacomo Petrobelli	(Italy)	51		1	
23	Russell Small	(United Kingdom)	40			
24	Bruce Hodges	(United Kingdom)	20			
25	Alan Kempson	(United Kingdom)	19			
26	Russell Bolesworth	(United Kingdom)	13			
27	Howard Spooner	(United Kingdom)	12			
28	Andy Demetriou	(Cyprus)	0			
