= Stefan Wilson =

British racing driver

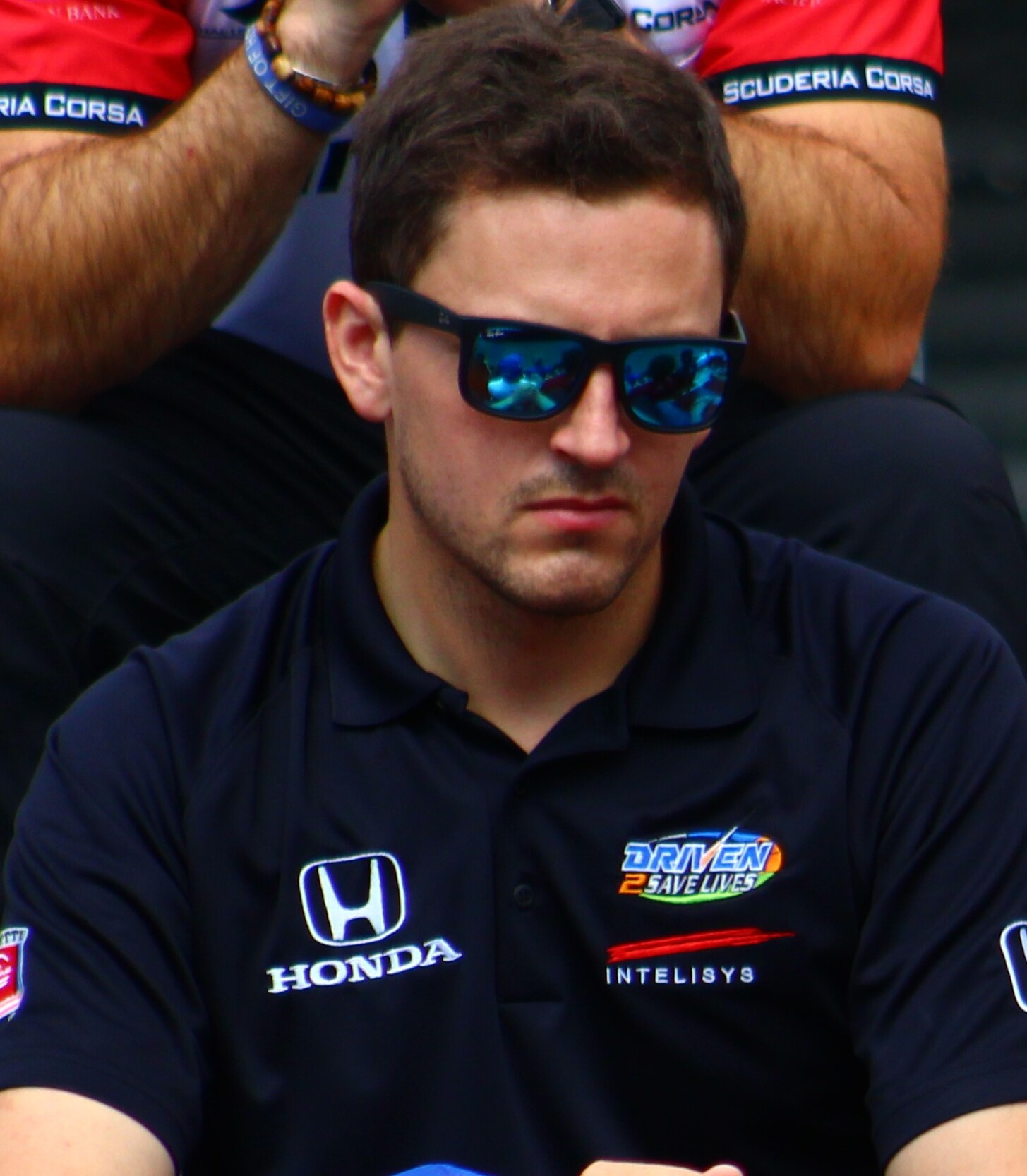
- Wilson at the Indianapolis Motor Speedway in 2018
- Nationality: (United Kingdom) British
- Born: 20 September 1989 (age 37) Rotherham, South Yorkshire, England
- Relatives: Justin Wilson (brother)
- Categorisation: FIA Gold (until 2015); FIA Silver (2016–)

IndyCar Series career
- 5 races run over 6 years
- Team: No. 24 (Dreyer & Reinbold Racing / Cusick Motorsports)
- 2022 position: 35th
- Best finish: 33rd (2013)
- First race: 2013 Grand Prix of Baltimore (Baltimore)
- Last race: 2022 Indianapolis 500 (Indianapolis)
Wins	Podiums	Poles
0	0	0

Previous series
- 2006–2007 2008 2009–2012: Formula Palmer Audi; British Formula 3 Indy Lights

Stefan James Wilson (born 20 September 1989 in Sheffield, UK) is a British racing driver. He is the younger brother of the late Formula One and IndyCar Series driver Justin Wilson. He is also the winner of the 2007 McLaren Autosport BRDC Award for promising young British drivers.

== Career ==
=== Formula Palmer Audi and British F3 ===
After a long karting career as a child, Wilson stepped up to open-wheel racing in November 2006, competing in the Formula Palmer Audi Autumn Trophy at Snetterton and Brands Hatch. Wilson gradually improved throughout his first six car races and finished the six-race mini-series in ninth place, also ending as top rookie. He picked up three top-six finishes and set the fastest lap in the final round at Brands Hatch.

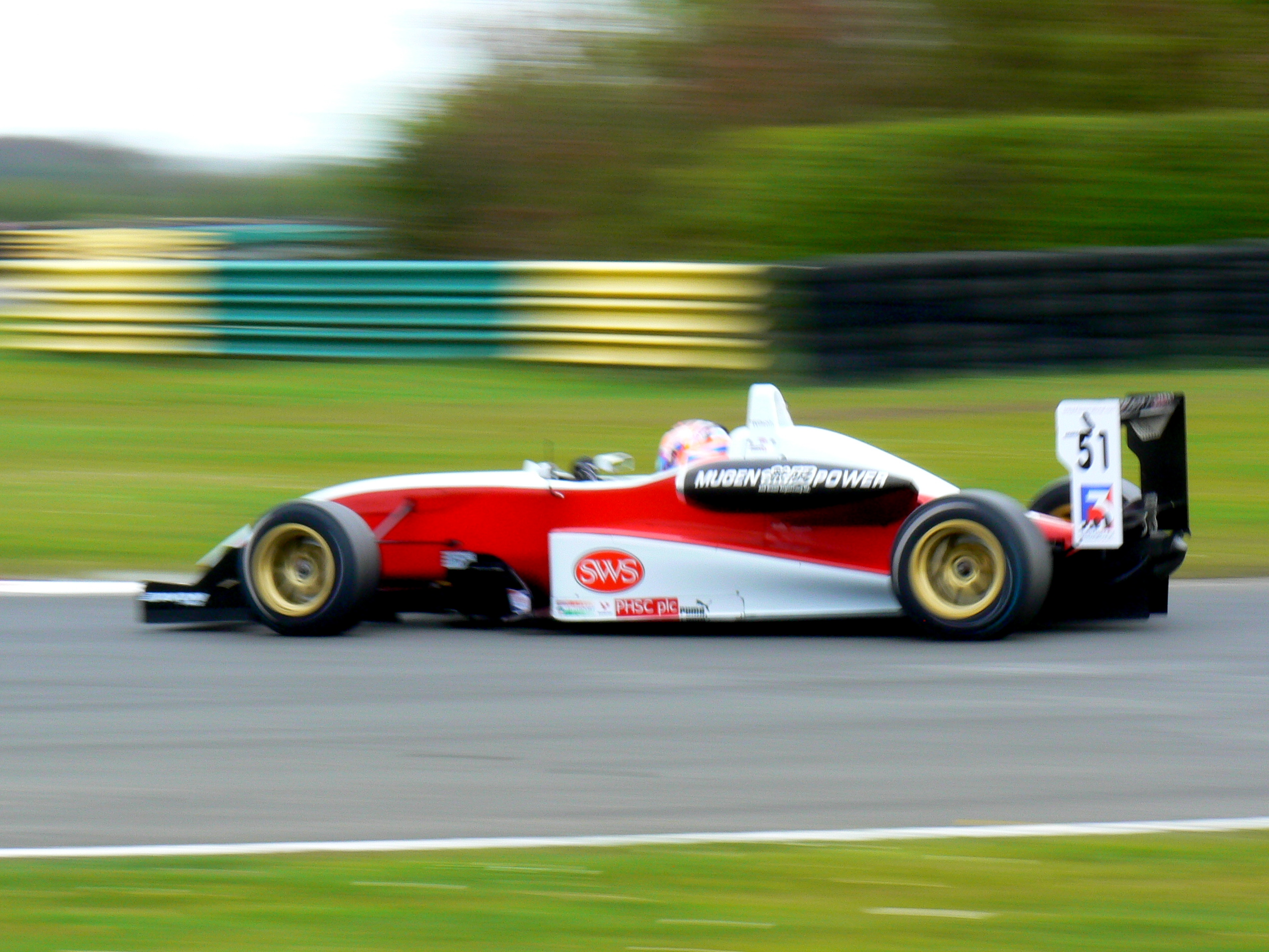
Wilson driving for Fluid Motorsport at the Croft round of the 2008 British Formula 3 season.

Wilson competed in the 2007 Formula Palmer Audi Championship, the tenth anniversary of the series, and also the tenth anniversary of when his brother Justin won the first FPA title. He finished second in the championship after a great final round at Croft, where he scored two podiums after his worst qualifying of the season, only starting seventh and ninth for the two races. Wilson overtook a total of eleven cars. He also closed the final gap between him and more experienced driver Tim Bridgman to just 28 points.

Wilson scored four wins throughout the season; the first came in round 4 of the championship at the Brands Hatch Grand Prix circuit in front of nearly 50,000 spectators. The second half of Wilson's championship was more successful as he scored four pole positions and three of his four wins. Wilson ended the championship in second place, with a tally of four wins, nine podiums, four pole positions, five fastest laps, and two lap records.

At the end of the season, Wilson won the McLaren Autosport BRDC Award for young British drivers. Part of the award was a prize drive in a McLaren Formula One car, which took place on the Silverstone National Circuit on 13 November 2009.

In 2008, Wilson competed in the British Formula 3 Championship National Class with Fluid Motorsport and captured four class wins on his way to fourth in the National Class points standings.

=== Indy Lights ===
Wilson signed to race a partial schedule in Firestone Indy Lights in 2009 for First Motorsports with cars prepared by Walker Racing that included six road and street courses. He qualified third at Long Beach but was sidelined by a mechanical problem towards the finish. His best finish was fourth in the wet/dry race at Toronto. In 2010 returned to the series to race for Bryan Herta Autosport. Wilson finished eleventh in points despite missing one race due to funding issues and another due to a damaged racecar. He had a career-best finish of third in the season opener at St. Pete and ran the fastest race lap in Toronto.

In 2011, Wilson returned to Indy Lights full-time with Andretti Autosport. He captured one pole, two wins, and finished on the podium three more times to finish third in the championship. Despite Wilson's 2011 success, he was out of racing until the 2012 Indy Lights season finale at Auto Club Speedway where he drove for Fan Force United and finished sixth.

=== IndyCar ===
Wilson made his IndyCar debut at the 2013 Grand Prix of Baltimore driving for Dale Coyne Racing, finishing sixteenth. His brother Justin drove the other full-time entry for Dale Coyne Racing, making the Wilson brothers the first pair of brothers to drive in IndyCar for the same team since Gary Bettenhausen and Tony Bettenhausen Jr. drove for their family team in 1983.

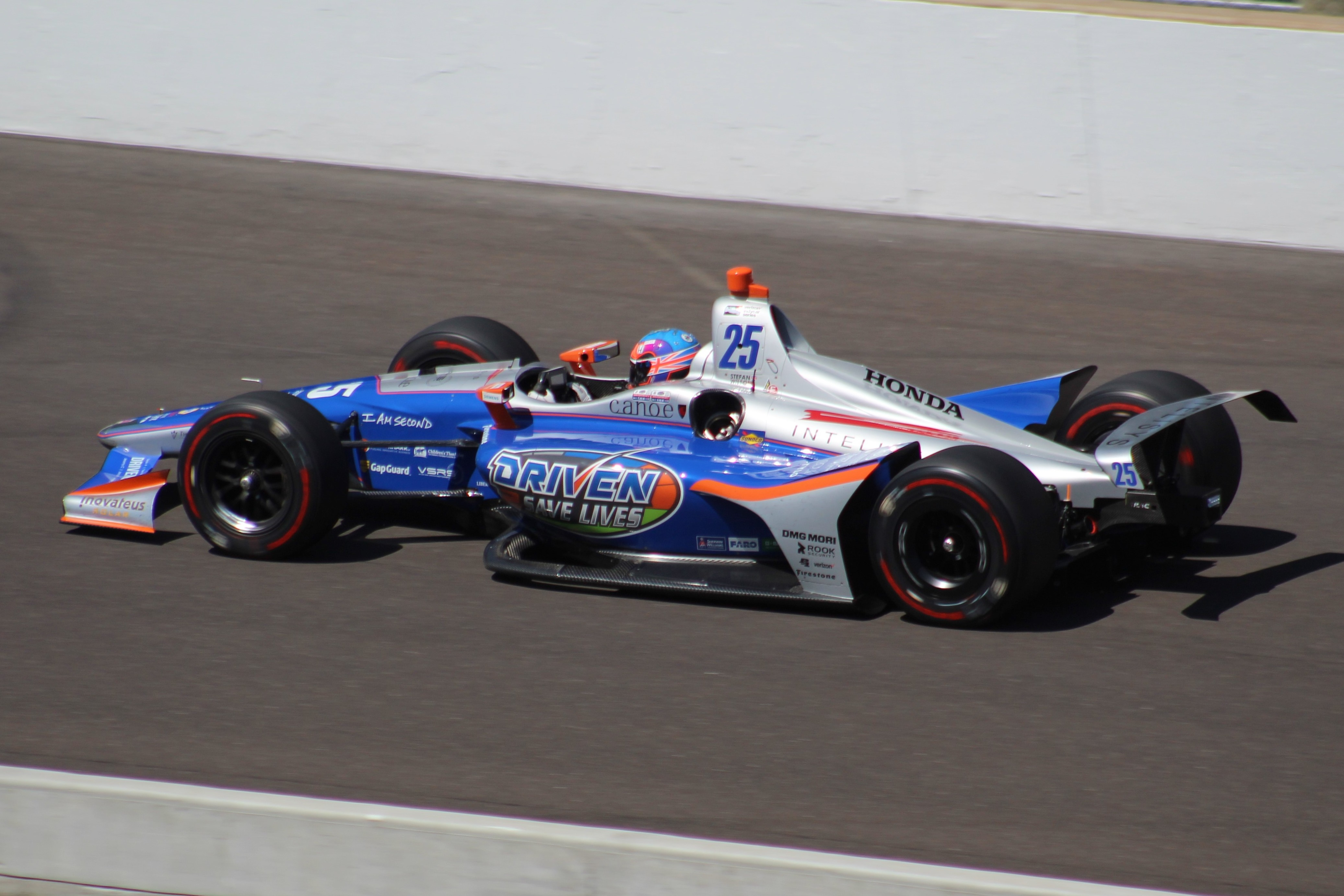
Wilson at the 2018 Indianapolis 500.

In June 2014, Fan Force United announced that they had signed Wilson for the team's full-time step up to the IndyCar Series in 2015. However, this entry ultimately did not materialize.

On 26 April 2016, it was announced that Wilson would be driving for KV Racing Technology at the 100th Running of the Indianapolis 500. Wilson would be driving the No. 25 Driven2SaveLives Chevy. He chose No. 25 in honor of his late brother Justin, who drove the No. 25 car when he received his fatal injuries during an incident at the 2015 ABC Supply 500.

A fuel gamble put Wilson in the lead late in the 2018 Indianapolis 500, but he had to pit for fuel with four laps to go, and Will Power won the race.

Wilson finished in last place at the 2021 Indianapolis 500 due to a crash upon entering the pit lane early in the race.

During the 2023 Indianapolis 500, Wilson originally qualified for the race with a starting position of 25th on the grid. However, during the last practice session, Wilson suffered a back injury when he crashed after Katherine Legge ran into the back of him. As a result, Wilson was forced to withdraw from the event and was replaced by Graham Rahal, who initially failed to qualify after being bumped from the field.

== Racing record ==
=== Career summary ===
Year	Series	Team	Races	Poles	Wins	Points	Position
2006	Formula Palmer Audi Autumn Trophy	Justin Wilson	6	0	0	52	9th
2007	Formula Palmer Audi		20	4	4	332	**2nd**
2008	British Formula 3 International Series - National	Fluid Motorsport Development	22	3	4	194	4th
2009	Indy Lights	First Motorsports/Walker Racing	6	0	0	112	22nd
2010	Indy Lights	Bryan Herta Autosport	11	0	0	278	11th
2011	Indy Lights	Andretti Autosport	14	1	2	450	**3rd**
2012	Indy Lights	Fan Force United	1	0	0	28	23rd
2013	IndyCar Series	Dale Coyne Racing	1	0	0	14	33rd
2016	IndyCar Series	KVSH Racing	1	0	0	14	33rd
2018	IndyCar Series	Andretti Autosport	1	0	0	31	34th
2021	IndyCar Series	Andretti Autosport	1	0	0	10	41st
2022	IndyCar Series	DragonSpeed / Cusick Motorsports	1	0	0	10	35th
2022	IMSA SportsCar Championship - GTD	Team Hardpoint	3	0	0	627	35th
2023	IndyCar Series	Dreyer & Reinbold Racing / Cusick Motorsports	0	0	0	0	NC

=== American open-wheel racing results ===
(key)

==== Indy Lights ====
Year	Team	1	2	3	4	5	6	7	8	9	10	11	12	13	14	15	Rank	Points	Ref
2009	FIRST/Derrick Walker Racing	STP1; 13	STP2; 17	LBH; 22	KAN	INDY	MIL	IOW	WGL; 12	TOR; 4	EDM	KTY	MOH; 8	SNM	CHI	HMS	**22nd**	**112**	
2010	Bryan Herta Autosport	STP; 3	ALA; 6	LBH; 17	INDY; 7	IOW; 7	WGL; 12	TOR; 3	EDM; 7	MOH; 4	SNM	CHI; 6	KTY; 12	HMS			**11th**	**278**	
2011	Andretti Autosport	STP; 16	ALA; 2	LBH; 3	INDY; 4	MIL; 8	IOW; 8	TOR; 1	EDM1; 4	EDM2; 2	TRO; 4	NHM; 12	BAL; 5	**KTY**; 1	LVS; 8		**3rd**	**450**	
2012	Fan Force United	STP	ALA	LBH	INDY	DET	MIL	IOW	TOR	EDM	TRO	BAL	FON; 6				**23rd**	**28**	

==== IndyCar Series ====
(key)

Year	Team	No.	Chassis	Engine	1	2	3	4	5	6	7	8	9	10	11	12	13	14	15	16	17	18	19	Rank	Points	Ref
2013	Dale Coyne Racing	18	Dallara DW12	Honda	STP	ALA	LBH	SAO	INDY	DET	DET	TXS	MIL	IOW	POC	TOR	TOR	MOH	SNM	BAL; 16	HOU	HOU	FON	33rd	14	
2016	KVSH Racing	25	Dallara DW12	Chevrolet	STP	PHX	LBH	ALA	IMS	INDY; 28	DET	DET	RDA	IOW	TOR	MOH	POC	TXS	WGL	SNM				34th	14	
2018	Andretti Autosport	25	Dallara DW12	Honda	STP	PHX	LBH	ALA	IMS	INDY; 15	DET	DET	TXS	RDA	IOW	TOR	MOH	POC	GTW	POR	SNM			34th	31	
2021	Andretti Autosport	25	Dallara DW12	Honda	ALA	STP	TXS	TXS	IMS	INDY; 33	DET	DET	ROA	MOH	NSH	IMS	GTW	POR	LAG	LBH				41st	10	
2022	DragonSpeed/Cusick Motorsports	25	Dallara DW12	Chevrolet	STP	TXS	LBH	ALA	IMS	INDY; 26	DET	ROA	MOH	TOR	IOW	IOW	IMS	NSH	GTW	POR	LAG			35th	10	
2023	Dreyer & Reinbold/Cusick Motorsports	24	Dallara DW12	Chevrolet	STP	TXS	LBH	ALA	IMS	INDY; Rpl	DET	ROA	MOH	TOR	IOW	IOW	NSH	IMS	GTW	POR	LAG			-	0	

==== Indianapolis 500 ====
Year	Chassis	Engine	Start	Finish	Team
2016	Dallara	Chevrolet	30	28	KVSH Racing
2018	Dallara	Honda	23	15	Andretti Autosport
2021	Dallara	Honda	28	33	Andretti Autosport
2022	Dallara	Chevrolet	33	27	DragonSpeed/Cusick Motorsports
2023	Dallara	Chevrolet	Replaced by Graham Rahal		Dreyer & Reinbold/Cusick Motorsports

=== Complete IMSA SportsCar Championship results ===
(key) (Races in bold indicate pole position; results in italics indicate fastest lap)

Year	Team	Class	Make	Engine	1	2	3	4	5	6	7	8	9	10	11	12	Pos.	Points	Ref
2017	BAR1 Motorsports	PC	Oreca FLM09	Chevrolet LS3 6.2 L V8.	DAY	SEB	COA; 2	DET	WGL	MOS	ELK	PET					17th	32	
2022	Team Hardpoint	GTD	Porsche 911 GT3 R	Porsche MA1.76/MDG.G 4.0 L Flat-6	DAY; 10	SEB; 8	LBH	LGA	MOH	DET	WGL; 14	MOS	LIM	ELK	VIR	PET	35th	627	

Awards
Preceded by Oliver Turvey	McLaren Autosport BRDC Award; 2007	Succeeded by Alexander Sims
