= Viktor Jensen =

Icelandic-British racing driver (born 1987)

- Nationality: Icelandic / British
- Born: 30 December 1987 (age 38) Hammersmith, London, England
- Relatives: David Jensen

Previous series
- 2007–08 2004–06: British F3; Formula Palmer Audi

Viktor Thor William Jensen (born 30 December 1987) is an Icelandic racing driver, with dual (British) nationality. His father is Canadian-born British radio DJ David Jensen.

Jensen read mechanical engineering at Imperial College London and is currently living in Hong Kong.

== Career ==
=== Karting ===
Jensen debuted in kart racing at 11 years old, winning his first novice race. Over the next five years, he quickly progressed through the ranks, culminating in competing at the CIK-FIA European ICA finals. Due to dual Icelandic/British nationality, he represented England in 2001 and 2002 at the Fathom Internations Challenge, himself winning the race in 2001.

=== Formula racing ===
In 2003, Jensen started to delve into the world of single-seater racing cars, attending the Formula BMW scholarship course in Valencia, Spain. Whetting his appetite to progress into cars, Viktor then tested a number of cars including Formula Ford, Formula Renault and Caterham Superlights. One of the cars tested was a Formula Palmer-Audi car. The FPA car impressed, and it was decided that 2004 would see Viktor competing in the Formula Palmer-Audi Championship.

In 2007, Jensen raced in the British Formula Three International Championship with the Alan Docking Racing team and in 2008 raced in the same series for the Nexa team.
