= 2022 Indianapolis 500 =

American motor race

106th Indianapolis 500

Indianapolis Motor Speedway

Indianapolis 500
- Sanctioning body: IndyCar
- Season: 2022 IndyCar season
- Date: May 29, 2022
- Winner: (Sweden) Marcus Ericsson
- Winning team: Chip Ganassi Racing
- Winning Chief Mechanic: Dave Pena
- Time of race: 2:51:00.6432
- Average speed: 175.428 mph (282.324 km/h)
- Pole position: (New Zealand) Scott Dixon
- Pole speed: 234.046 mph (376.661 km/h)
- Fastest qualifier: (New Zealand) Scott Dixon
- Rookie of the Year: (United States) Jimmie Johnson
- Most laps led: (New Zealand) Scott Dixon (95)

Pre-race ceremonies
- National anthem: Jordan Fisher
- "Back Home Again in Indiana": Jim Cornelison
- Starting command: Roger Penske
- Pace car: Chevrolet Corvette (C8)
- Pace car driver: Sarah Fisher
- Starter: Aarron Likens
- Honorary starter: Miles Teller

Television in the United States
- Network: NBC
- Announcers: Leigh Diffey, Townsend Bell, James Hinchcliffe
- Nielsen ratings: 2.69 (4.618 million viewers)

Chronology
Previous	Next
2021	2023

The 2022 Indianapolis 500 (branded as the 106th Running of the Indianapolis 500 presented by Gainbridge for sponsorship reasons) was a 500-mile (804.7 km, 200 lap) race in the 2022 IndyCar Series, held on Sunday, May 29, 2022, at the Indianapolis Motor Speedway in Speedway, Indiana. The month of May activities formally began on May 14 with the GMR Grand Prix on the combined road course. Practice on the oval opened on May 17, and time trials took place on May 21–22. Carb Day, the traditional final day of practice, along with the Pit Stop Challenge, took place on May 27.

Six-time IndyCar champion, and 2008 Indianapolis 500 winner Scott Dixon won the pole position, his fifth career Indy 500 pole. It was also Chip Ganassi Racing's seventh Indy pole. Dixon's qualifying speed of 234.046 mph (376.661 km/h) was the fastest Indy 500 pole speed until Scott McLaughlin broke the record in 2024 at 234.220 mph (376.941 km/h), and was the third-fastest Indy 500 qualifying attempt in history. Dixon moved into second on the all-time list for poles at Indy, behind only Rick Mears, who had six. The top twelve starting positions saw a near even split with seven Hondas and five Chevrolets. During the race, Dixon became the all-time lap leader in the history of the Indy 500.

Dixon led the most laps (95), and dominated much of the race along with teammate Álex Palou. With 25 laps to go, however, during his final pit stop, Dixon was penalized for speeding entering the pit lane. Dixon was issued a drive-through penalty, which took him out of contention and handed the lead to his teammate, Marcus Ericsson. Ericsson held off a furious charge from Pato O'Ward on a restart with two laps to go to win the race. Ericsson became the second Swedish winner in the race's history, after Kenny Bräck in 1999.

== Race background ==
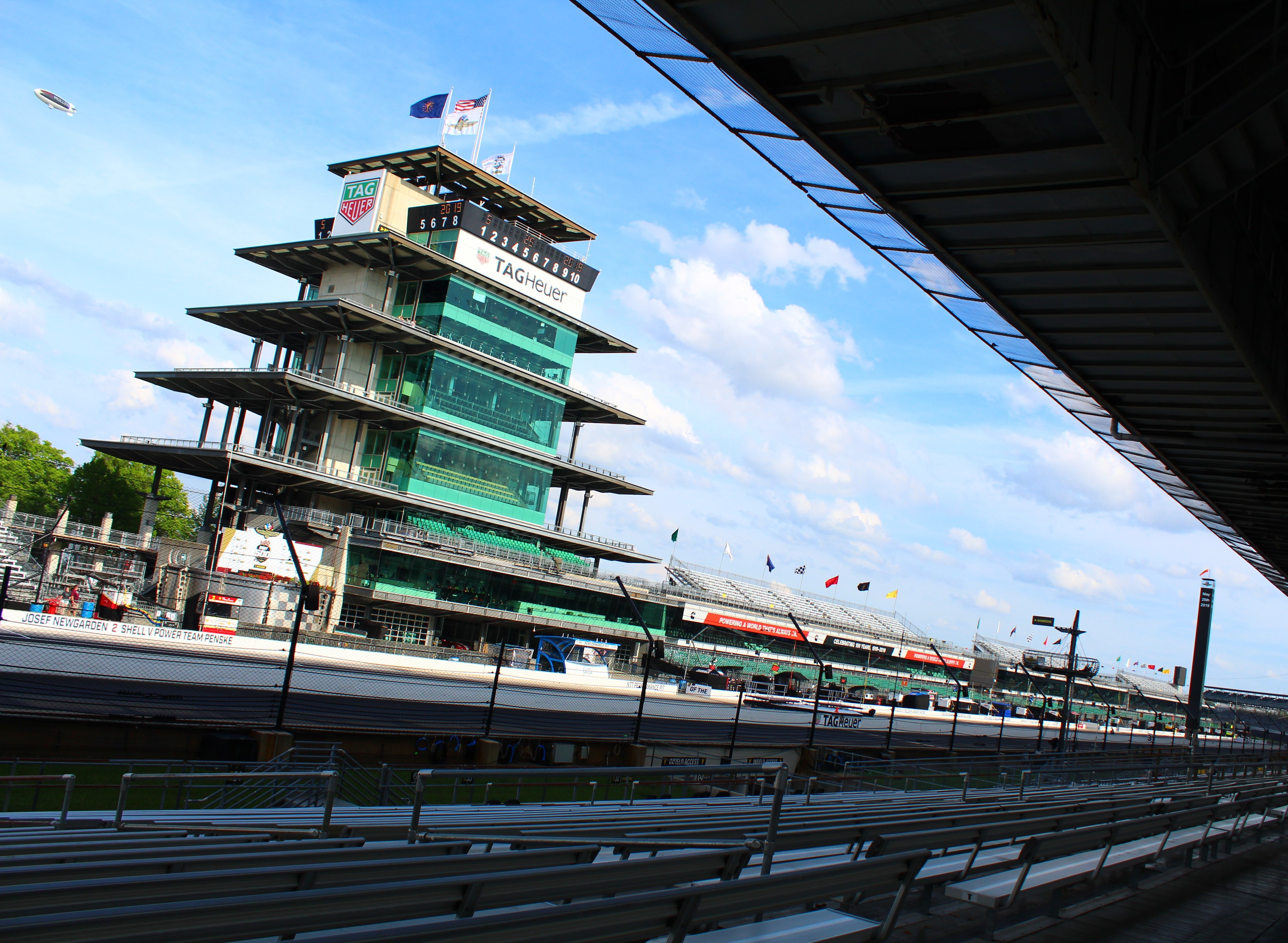
The Pagoda, the control tower which houses officials, broadcasting, and hospitality suites, is an icon at the Indianapolis Motor Speedway.

=== Sponsorship ===
On January 31, 2019, it was announced that the online financial services company Gainbridge would become the new presenting sponsor of the 500 under a four-year deal. This will be the fourth year under the current deal.

=== Rule changes ===
- During pit stops, crew members are prohibited from physically assisting with the car's exit of the pit box. A car must leave the pits under its own power and can not be pushed.
- All pneumatic wheel guns must not have any electronic devices attached. "Smart" wheel guns, with electronic torque sensors, have been banned.
- Championship bonus points will be awarded to the top twelve qualifiers. This reflects a new qualifying procedure (see below). From 2018 to 2021, the top nine qualifiers earned bonus points. Now, the pole position winner receives 12 bonus points, down to 1 bonus point for the 12th qualifier (12–11–10–9–8–7–6–5–4–3–2–1). Points earned for the race finishing positions are unchanged. All finishers earn double championships points for the Indy 500 (the case since 2014).

=== Qualifying changes ===
The Two-day format that began in 2019 has been expanded, based on the popularity of the three-round system used for most of the IndyCar road and street courses events. The system will continue to use the two day system (Saturday May 21 & Sunday May 22), and cars will continue to utilize the traditional four-lap qualifying attempts. The top twelve cars from the first day will advance to a new second round that will take place on the second day. The top six cars in the second round advance to the final round to determine the pole position as well as starting positions two through six. If more than 33 entries take part in the event, the Last Chance Qualifying session will be used once again to set starting positions 31–32–33.

On Saturday, the procedure will be as follows:

- Qualifying will be open from 12:00 p.m. to 5:50 p.m. All cars entered will be guaranteed at least one attempt. Additional attempts are allowed, time/weather permitting.
- Cars ranking 1–12 will advance to second round qualifying.
- Cars ranking 13–30 will be locked-in to those starting positions, and will not re-qualify.
- Cars ranking 31 and lower will be entered into the Last Chance Qualifying.
- If there are only 33 entries, the Last Chance Qualifying will not be held, and instead all positions 13–33 will be locked-in.

On Sunday, time trials will conclude as follows:

- At 2 p.m. the Last Chance Qualifying session will be held (if necessary). Entries that ranked 31st and lower on Saturday will have at least one attempt to qualify. Qualifying speeds from Saturday will be erased. Additional attempts will be allowed, time/weather permitting, until 3 p.m. Starting positions 31–32–33 will be filled. All other cars from 34th and lower will fail to qualify.
- At 4 p.m., the second round of qualifying will be held. The cars that ranked 1st through 12th on Saturday will have one guaranteed attempt. Qualifying speeds from Saturday will be erased. Cars will go out in reverse order (12th to 1st). The cars ranking 7th through 12th will be locked-in to those starting positions. The top six cars will advance to the final round.
- At 5:10 p.m., the final round of qualifying will be held. The cars that ranked 1st through 6th during the second round will have one guaranteed attempt. Qualifying speeds from the Top 12 session will be erased. Cars will go out in reverse order (6th to 1st). The top six starting positions will be set, including the pole position.

=== 2022 IndyCar Series ===
The 2022 Indianapolis 500 was the sixth race of the 2022 NTT IndyCar Series season. Four different drivers won the first five races of the season, including one first-time winner. Scott McLaughlin won the season opener at St. Petersburg, his first career IndyCar win. At Texas, Josef Newgarden won, passing McLaughlin coming off the last turn of the last lap. Newgarden followed up with another win at Long Beach and Pato O'Ward won at Alabama in a time-shortened race (two hours) due to rain. The GMR Grand Prix was won by Colton Herta. Despite zero wins thus far on the season, Will Power entered the 500 as the series points leader.

== Race schedules ==
The 2022 IndyCar Series schedule was announced on September 19, 2021. The Indianapolis 500 was for Sunday, May 29. Practice, time trials, and other ancillary events are scheduled for the two weeks leading up to the race. The GMR Grand Prix, including the Road to Indy races, will again serve as the opening weekend of track activity, on May 14. The Freedom 100 for the Indy Lights was left off the schedule for the third year in a row, with Roger Penske citing safety as an issue. The 2022 Indy Lights season will only include a race on the road course during GMR Grand Prix weekend.

Race schedules — May 2022
Sun	Mon	Tue	Wed	Thu	Fri	Sat
1 Barber	2	3	4	5	6	7 Mini-Marathon
8	9	10	11	12	13; GMR Grand Prix	14; GMR Grand Prix
15	16	17; Practice	18; Practice	19; Practice	20; Fast Friday	21; Time Trials
22; Time Trials	23; Practice	24	25	26	27; Carb Day	28; Parade
29; Indianapolis 500	30; Memorial Day	31				

Color	Notes
Green	Practice
Dark Blue	Time trials
Silver	Race day
Red	Rained out*
Blank	No track activity

* Includes days where track
activity was significantly limited due to rain

Source: 2022 Indianapolis 500 Event Schedule

== Entry list ==
All entries utilized the Dallara DW12 chassis with the Universal Aero Kit 18, with Firestone tires. A total of 32 car/driver combinations were made official in time for the Open test on April 20. Paretta Autosport (in technical alliance with Ed Carpenter Racing) announced on April 19 that they would not enter, electing instead to focus on road/street course races during the summer months. The 33rd and final entry was announced on May 5, with DragonSpeed and Cusick Motorsports joining to field a car. The official entry list was published on May 16, 2022.

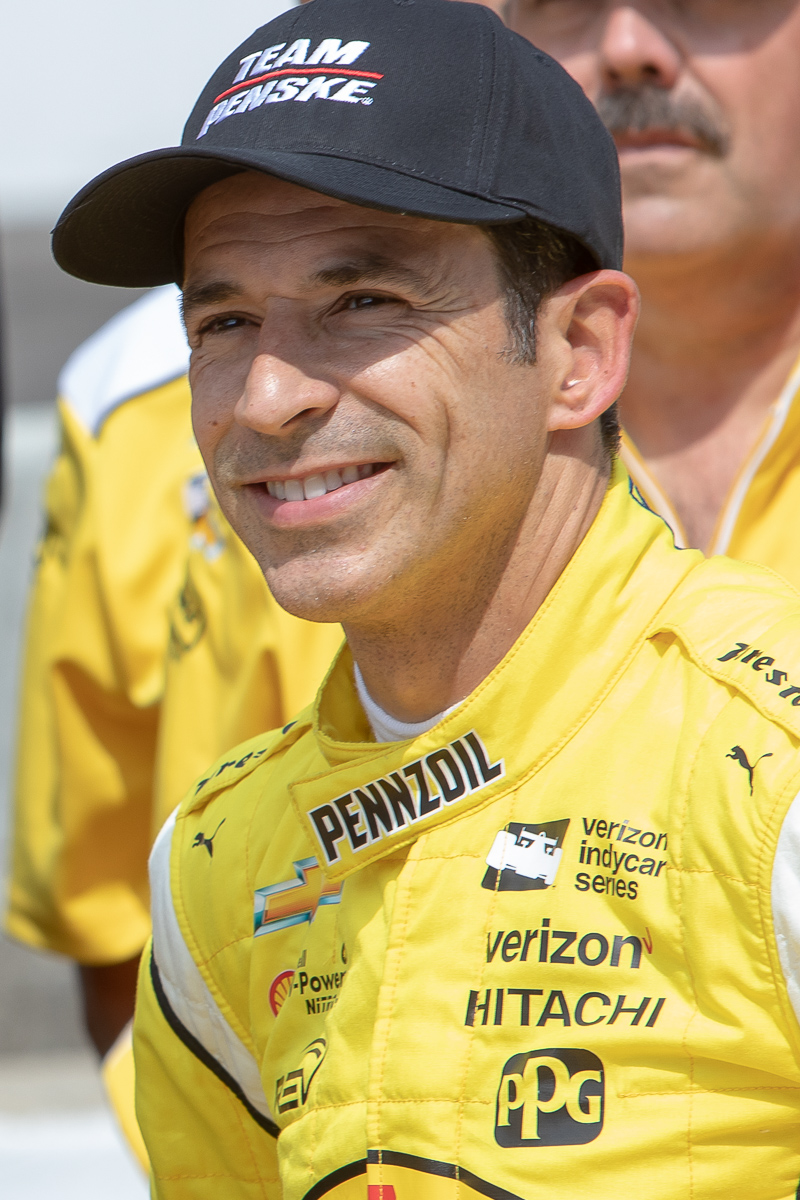
Four-time Indy 500 winner Hélio Castroneves (2001, 2002, 2009, 2021) had the most previous starts in the field with 21.

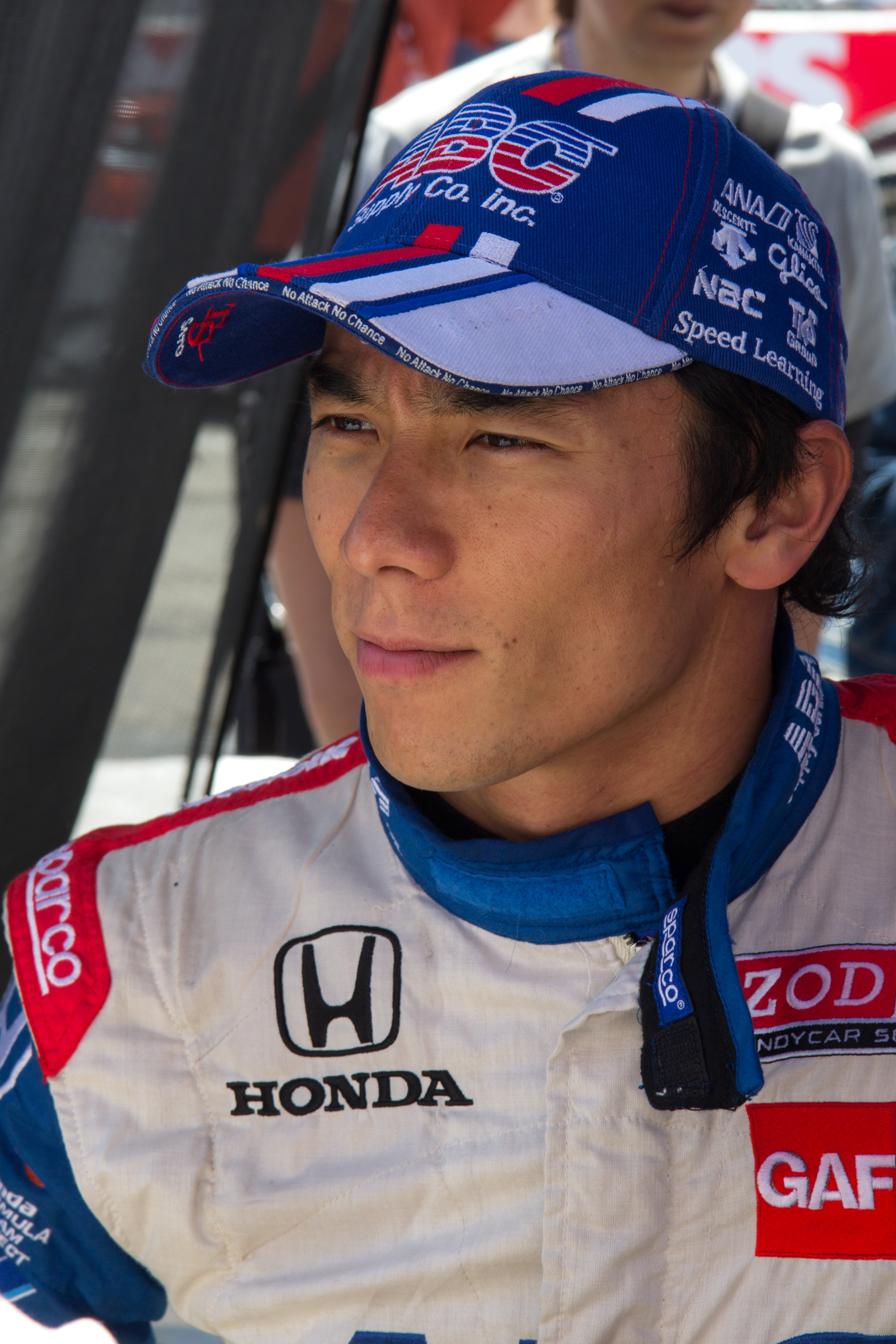
Two-time winner Takuma Sato won the race in 2017 and 2020.

No.	Driver	Team	Engine
1	(Brazil) Tony Kanaan W	Chip Ganassi Racing	Honda
2	(United States) Josef Newgarden	Team Penske	Chevrolet
3	(New Zealand) Scott McLaughlin	Team Penske	Chevrolet
4	(Canada) Dalton Kellett	A. J. Foyt Enterprises	Chevrolet
5	(Mexico) Pato O'Ward	Arrow McLaren SP	Chevrolet
6	(Colombia) Juan Pablo Montoya W	Arrow McLaren SP	Chevrolet
06	(Brazil) Hélio Castroneves W	Meyer Shank Racing	Honda
7	(Sweden) Felix Rosenqvist	Arrow McLaren SP	Chevrolet
8	(Sweden) Marcus Ericsson	Chip Ganassi Racing	Honda
9	(New Zealand) Scott Dixon W	Chip Ganassi Racing	Honda
10	(Spain) Álex Palou	Chip Ganassi Racing	Honda
11	(United States) J. R. Hildebrand	A. J. Foyt Enterprises	Chevrolet
12	(Australia) Will Power W	Team Penske	Chevrolet
14	(United States) Kyle Kirkwood R	A. J. Foyt Enterprises	Chevrolet
15	(United States) Graham Rahal	Rahal Letterman Lanigan Racing	Honda
18	(United States) David Malukas R	Dale Coyne Racing with HMD Motorsports	Honda
20	(United States) Conor Daly	Ed Carpenter Racing	Chevrolet
21	(Netherlands) Rinus VeeKay	Ed Carpenter Racing	Chevrolet
23	(United States) Santino Ferrucci	Dreyer & Reinbold Racing	Chevrolet
24	(United States) Sage Karam	Dreyer & Reinbold Racing	Chevrolet
25	(United Kingdom) Stefan Wilson	DragonSpeed / Cusick Motorsports	Chevrolet
26	(United States) Colton Herta	Andretti Autosport w/ Curb-Agajanian	Honda
27	(United States) Alexander Rossi W	Andretti Autosport	Honda
28	(France) Romain Grosjean R	Andretti Autosport	Honda
29	(Canada) Devlin DeFrancesco R	Andretti Steinbrenner Autosport	Honda
30	(Denmark) Christian Lundgaard R	Rahal Letterman Lanigan Racing	Honda
33	(United States) Ed Carpenter	Ed Carpenter Racing	Chevrolet
45	(United Kingdom) Jack Harvey	Rahal Letterman Lanigan Racing	Honda
48	(United States) Jimmie Johnson R	Chip Ganassi Racing	Honda
51	(Japan) Takuma Sato W	Dale Coyne Racing with Rick Ware Racing	Honda
60	(France) Simon Pagenaud W	Meyer Shank Racing	Honda
77	(United Kingdom) Callum Ilott R	Juncos Hollinger Racing	Chevrolet
98	(United States) Marco Andretti	Andretti Herta Autosport with Marco Andretti & Curb-Agajanian	Honda
OFFICIAL REPORT

- W Former Indianapolis 500 Winner
- R Indianapolis 500 Rookie

== Testing and Rookie Orientation ==
=== October 2021 ===
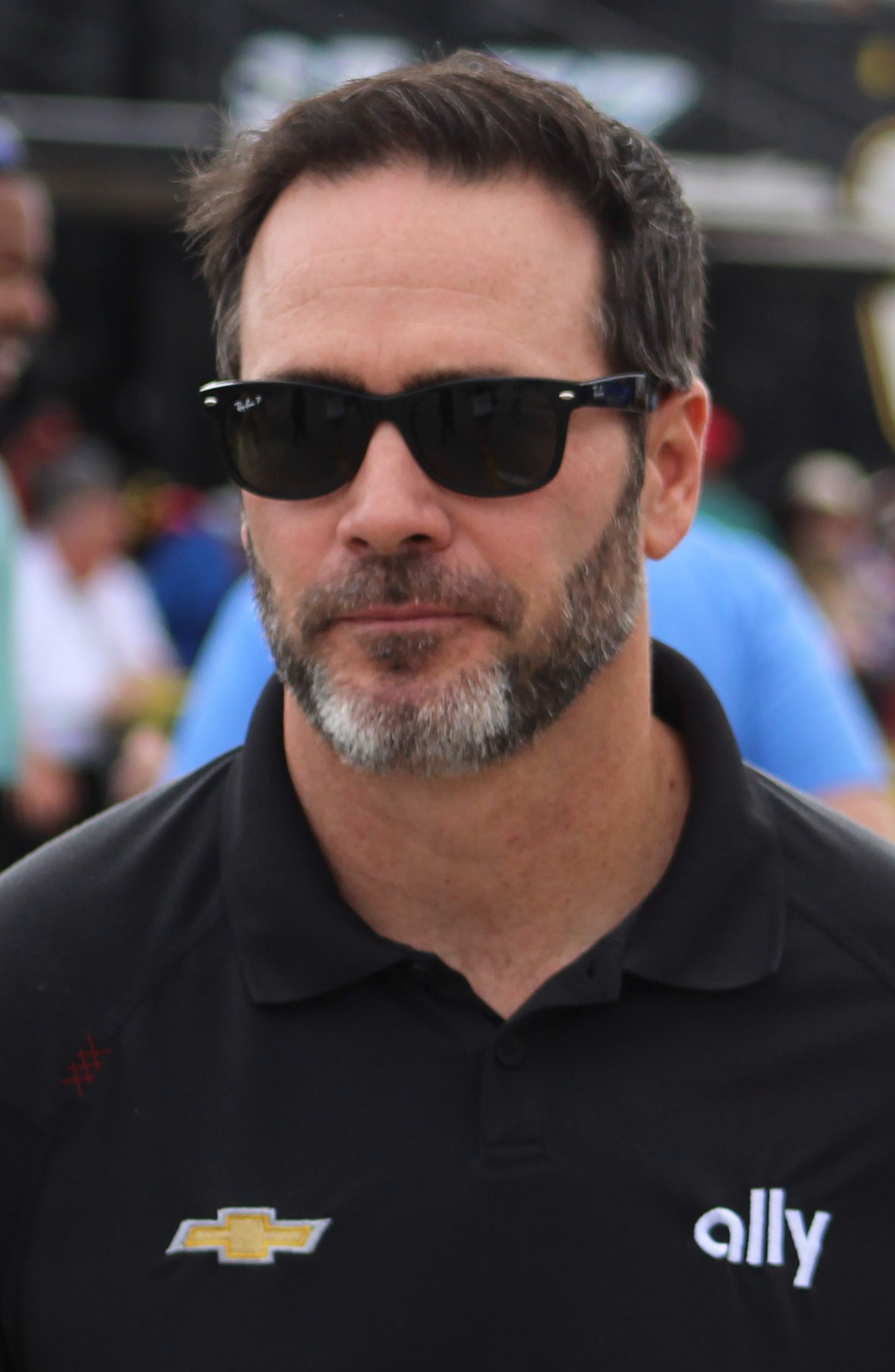
7-time NASCAR Cup Series champion, and 4-time Brickyard 400 winner Jimmie Johnson began the Rookie Orientation Program in October 2021.

A private offseason Firestone tire test was scheduled for October 8. Hélio Castroneves (Meyer Shank Racing) and Pato O'Ward (Arrow McLaren SP) were scheduled to participate. Jimmie Johnson (Ganassi) and Romain Grosjean (Andretti) were scheduled to complete the Rookie Orientation Program during a separate session on October 6.

Rookie Orientation consists of three phases. Phase 1 was ten laps between 205 and 210 mph (330 and 338 km/h), Phase 2 was fifteen laps between 210 and 215 mph (338 and 346 km/h), and Phase 3 was fifteen laps over 215 mph (346 km/h). Lingering rain hampered track activity, but the track was dried and Johnson and Grosjean both completed Phase 1 and Phase 2. Both drivers completed about half of Phase 3 before a downpour closed the track for the day at 4:15 p.m.. Series officials announced that both drivers had completed a satisfactory amount of laps, and would be eligible to participate in the full-field Open Test scheduled for April.

On Friday October 8, Castroneves and O'Ward conducted baseline testing, as well as preliminary KERS testing. No incidents were reported, and no speeds were announced.

=== Veteran Only Test — Wednesday April 20 ===
- Weather: 64 °F (18 °C), light rain early, cloudy in the afternoon
- Summary: A full-field open test was scheduled at the Indianapolis Motor Speedway oval for April 20–21, 2022. All 32 confirmed entries for the 2022 Indianapolis 500 were present for the test. Light rain delayed testing by roughly 90 minutes, with the veterans only session beginning at roughly 12:30 p.m. Scott Dixon was fastest in the opening session at 225.622 mph (363.103 km/h), while Scott McLaughlin was second. McLaughlin was fastest in the "no-tow" rankings – laps set without the benefit of aerodynamic drafting. The only significant incident of the opening session came when Alexander Rossi spun in the pit exit lane during his first installment lap, but avoided any contact and continued on.

Top Practice Speeds
Pos	No.	Driver	Team	Engine	Speed (mph)	Speed (km/h)
1	9	(New Zealand) Scott Dixon	Chip Ganassi Racing	Honda	225.622	363.103
2	3	(New Zealand) Scott McLaughlin	Team Penske	Chevrolet	223.984	360.467
3	23	(United States) Santino Ferrucci	Dreyer & Reinbold Racing	Chevrolet	223.053	358.969
OFFICIAL REPORT

=== Rookie Orientation / Refresher tests — Wednesday April 20 ===
- Summary: At 2:30 p.m., the track was opened to drivers needing to complete Rookie Orientation and veteran Refresher tests. Eight drivers took to the track during the session, with all rookies and two of the veterans completing their tests. Juan Pablo Montoya and Sage Karam did not pass their refresher programs, but had completed enough to be allowed on track for the full-field session later in the day. The fastest time in the session came from rookie Callum Ilott at 222.184 mph (357.570 km/h). No incidents were reported.

Top Practice Speeds
Pos	No.	Driver	Team	Engine	Speed (mph)	Speed (km/h)
1	77	(United Kingdom) Callum Ilott R	Juncos Hollinger Racing	Chevrolet	222.184	357.570
2	29	(Canada) Devlin DeFrancesco R	Andretti Autosport	Honda	221.608	356.644
3	98	(United States) Marco Andretti	Andretti Herta Autosport w/ Marco Andretti and Curb-Agajanian	Honda	220.501	354.862
OFFICIAL REPORT

=== Open Test — Wednesday April 20 ===
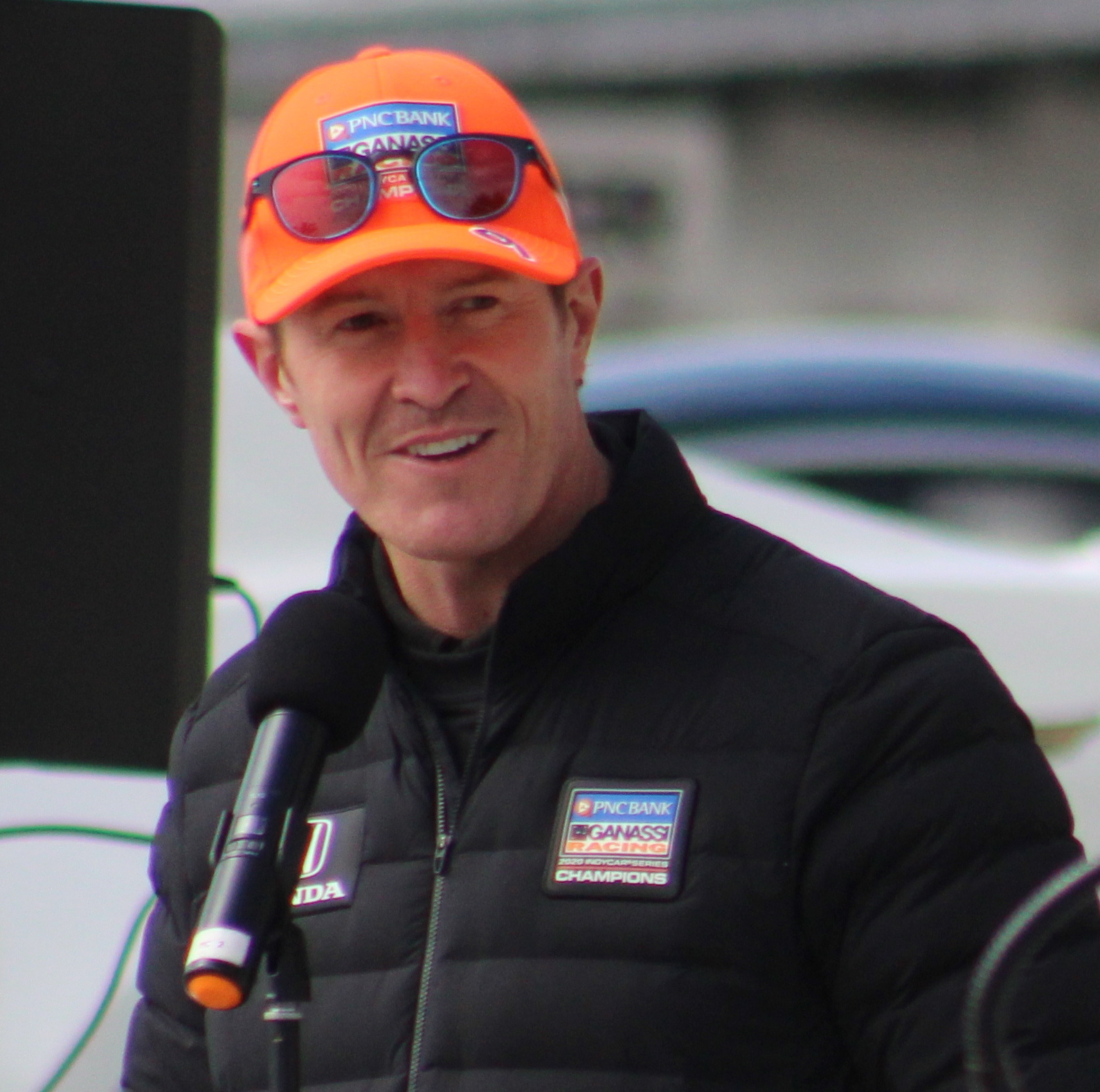
Scott Dixon led the first day of the Open Test.

- Summary: The track was opened to the full field at 4:30 p.m. and was scheduled to stay open until 6:30 p.m. This session saw two significant incidents. At roughly 5:10 p.m., Hélio Castroneves lost control of his car in the warm up lane heading into turn 2. Castroneves spun nearly 360 degrees before impacting the outside wall. About twenty minutes later, Will Power spun from the warm up lane in turn 1 and out onto the racing surface. Colton Herta narrowly avoided Power's car, but lost control of his own in the process, suffering light damage to the rear of the car as he brushed the outside wall at the exit of turn 1. Marcus Ericsson narrowly avoided Herta's spinning car and continued on back to the pit lane with no damage. IndyCar elected to end the session 40 minutes early to allow officials and representatives from Firestone to examine the pit exit lane for a potential cause for the three incidents that occurred during the day. Scott Dixon returned to the top of the time sheets, turning a lap at 227.187 mph (365.622 km/h). Only ten drivers completed "no-tow" laps during the session, but Scott McLaughlin was fastest again with a lap at 219.841 mph (353.800 km/h).

Top Practice Speeds
Pos	No.	Driver	Team	Engine	Speed (mph)	Speed (km/h)
1	9	(New Zealand) Scott Dixon	Chip Ganassi Racing	Honda	227.187	365.622
2	20	(United States) Conor Daly	Ed Carpenter Racing	Chevrolet	226.985	365.297
3	77	(United Kingdom) Callum Ilott R	Juncos Hollinger Racing	Chevrolet	226.308	364.207
OFFICIAL REPORT

=== Open Test — Thursday April 21 ===
- Weather: 68 °F (20 °C), rain in the morning, mostly cloudy in the afternoon
- Summary: The second day of a full-field open test was scheduled April 22 from 10 a.m. to 4 p.m. After three incidents on the warm-up lane during testing on Wednesday, series and track officials inspected the course overnight. A chemical sealant applied to the asphalt surface the previous autumn was believed to be the culprit. The grip levels on the warm-up lanes were measured to be significantly lower than that of the racing surface. Track crews spent the night prepping the asphalt along the warm-up lanes and pit lane by dragging tires and scrubbing the surface. Due to morning rain and moisture, Thursday's testing was rescheduled for 2:30 p.m. to 6:30 p.m. Speeds increased across nearly the whole field for the second test day, with 15 drivers completing laps quicker than the fastest time from the opening day. Josef Newgarden turned the fastest lap on the day, running at 229.519 mph (369.375 km/h). Rinus VeeKay was fastest in the "no-tow" rankings at 221.314 mph (356.170 km/h). Hélio Castroneves was the only driver to not partake in the session, as his Meyer Shank Racing team elected not to run after the opening day crash to repair damages. There were no incidents during the Thursday session.

Top Practice Speeds
Pos	No.	Driver	Team	Engine	Speed (mph)	Speed (km/h)
1	2	(United States) Josef Newgarden	Team Penske	Chevrolet	229.519	369.375
2	51	(Japan) Takuma Sato	Dale Coyne Racing w/ Rick Ware Racing	Honda	229.427	369.227
3	1	(Brazil) Tony Kanaan	Chip Ganassi Racing	Honda	228.767	368.165
OFFICIAL REPORT

== Practice ==
=== Opening Day — Tuesday May 17 ===
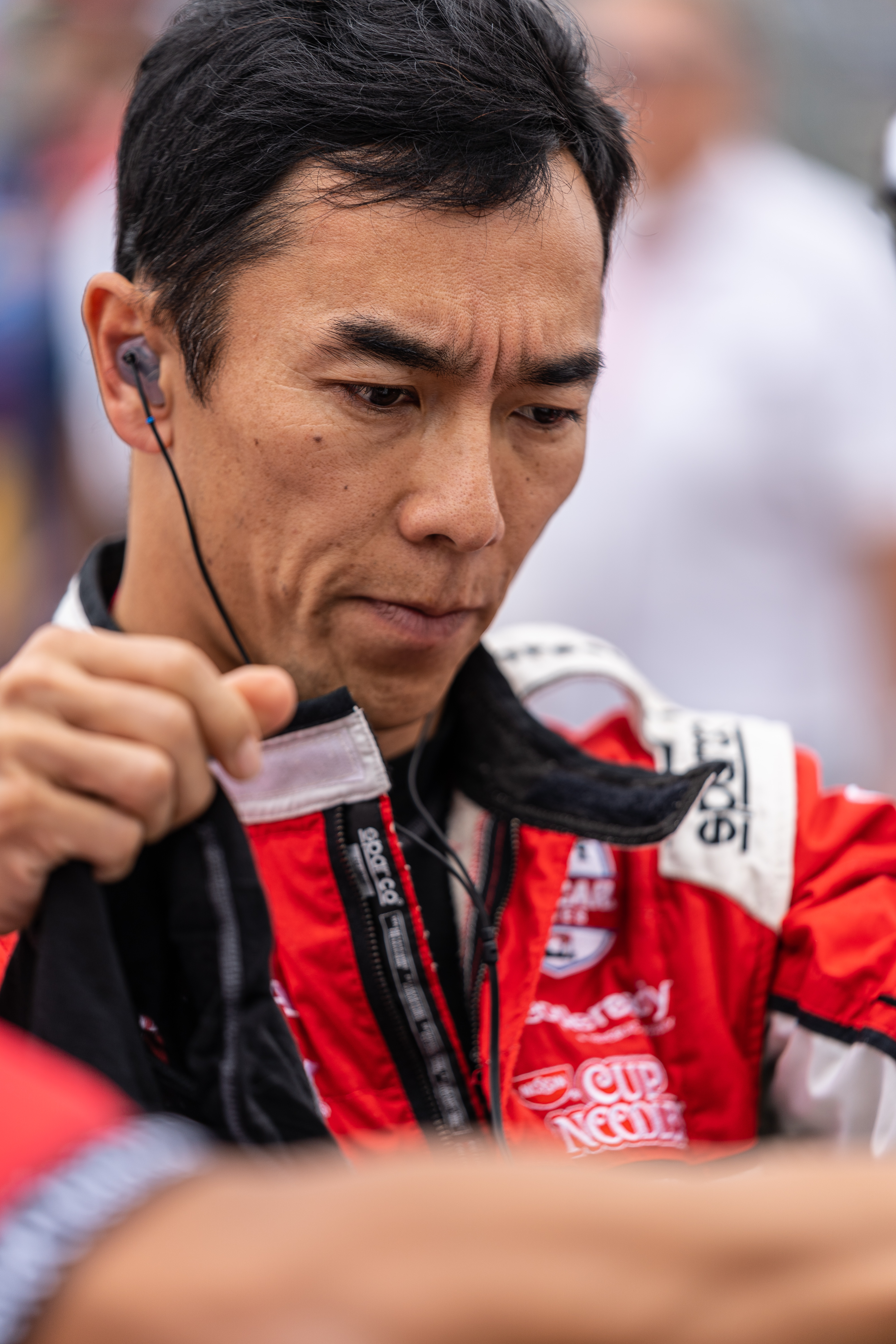
Takuma Sato was fastest on the opening day of practice

- Weather: 79 °F (26 °C), Fair to partly cloudy

==== Veteran session ====
- Summary: The opening day of practice began at 9:00 a.m. with a one hour-fifteen minute session for veterans and those who had finished their rookie/refresher tests. All entries took to the track except for Stefan Wilson, who needed to complete his veteran refresher program later in the day. Scott Dixon was fastest in the veteran session, running a lap at 227.119 mph (365.513 km/h). His teammate Tony Kanaan had the fastest "no-tow" speed of the session at 221.662 mph (356.730 km/h). No major incidents were reported. During initial install laps, Ed Carpenter, Jimmie Johnson, and Scott Dixon all came to the pits with smoke pouring from their engine bays. After investigation from the respective crews, the smoke was nothing more than routine burn-off of excess sealant.

Top Practice Speeds
Pos	No.	Driver	Team	Engine	Speed (mph)	Speed (km/h)
1	9	(New Zealand) Scott Dixon	Chip Ganassi Racing	Honda	227.119	365.513
2	8	(Sweden) Marcus Ericsson	Chip Ganassi Racing	Honda	226.965	365.265
3	24	(United States) Sage Karam	Dreyer & Reinbold Racing	Chevrolet	226.398	364.352
OFFICIAL REPORT

==== Rookie and refresher tests ====
At 12:00 p.m., the track was opened for three hours for rookie and refresher testing. As nearly all drivers had participated in the April test session, Stefan Wilson was the lone participant in the session. Wilson passed his refresher test without incident. He turned a top lap of 218.477 mph (351.605 km/h).

==== Combined session ====
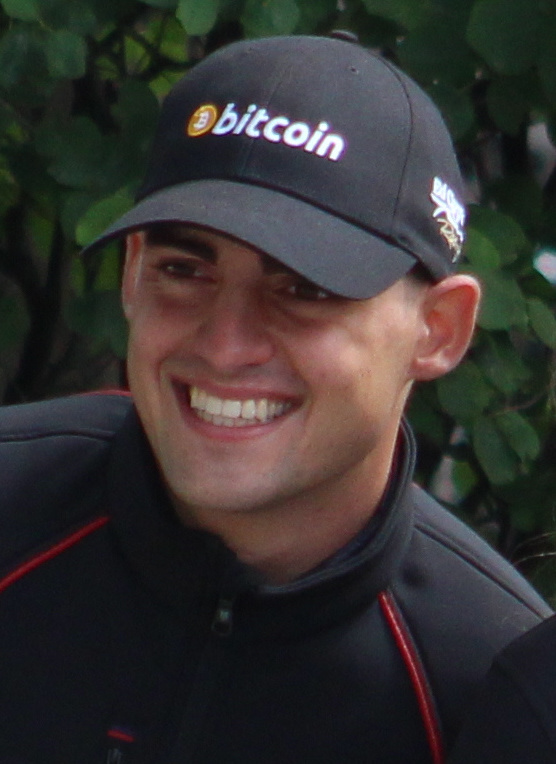
Rinus VeeKay turned the fastest "no-tow" lap of the day.

All 33 drivers took to the track during the session, turning a combined 3,229 laps. Takuma Sato set the fastest lap late in the day, running at 228.939 mph (368.442 km/h). Rinus VeeKay was fastest in the no-tow rankings, running a lap at 221.551 mph (356.552 km/h) with no aid from aerodynamic drafting. No major incidents were reported, but the session was briefly disrupted by a fox entering the race course. Honda-powered machines took eight of the top ten spots for the session.

Top Practice Speeds
Pos	No.	Driver	Team	Engine	Speed (mph)	Speed (km/h)
1	51	(Japan) Takuma Sato	Dale Coyne Racing w/ Rick Ware Racing	Honda	228.939	368.442
2	9	(New Zealand) Scott Dixon	Chip Ganassi Racing	Honda	227.768	366.557
3	48	(United States) Jimmie Johnson R	Chip Ganassi Racing	Honda	227.722	366.483
OFFICIAL REPORT

=== Wednesday May 18 ===
- Weather: 64 °F (18 °C), rain
- Summary: Rain washed out practice for the day. The track was officially closed at 3:15 p.m. It was the first time since 2016 that an entire practice day was lost to weather.

=== Thursday May 19 ===
- Weather: 79 °F (26 °C), Mostly cloudy
- Summary: Thursday practice opened at 12:00 p.m. and remained open until 6:00 p.m. A total of 3,114 laps were turned across all cars. Takuma Sato was the fastest driver of the day for the second session in a row, turning a lap at 227.519 mph (366.156 km/h), while Scott Dixon was second fastest also for the second-straight time. Team Penske driver Will Power completed the fastest no-tow lap of the day, running at 224.325 mph (361.016 km/h). There were no incidents reported. The practice was the last pre-qualifying session using race day turbo boost levels, as teams would increase boost to qualifying levels for "Fast Friday".

Top Practice Speeds
Pos	No.	Driver	Team	Engine	Speed (mph)	Speed (km/h)
1	51	(Japan) Takuma Sato	Dale Coyne Racing w/ Rick Ware Racing	Honda	227.519	366.156
2	9	(New Zealand) Scott Dixon	Chip Ganassi Racing	Honda	227.335	365.860
3	18	(United States) David Malukas R	Dale Coyne Racing w/ HMD Motorsports	Honda	226.869	365.110
OFFICIAL REPORT

=== Fast Friday — Friday May 20 ===
- Weather: 87 °F (31 °C), Partly cloudy, strong sustained winds with gusts up to 40 mph (64 km/h)
- Summary: Friday practice saw teams increase boost pressures to qualifying levels in preparation for the weekend qualifying sessions. Running was limited throughout the day due to strong winds, with few teams electing to turn more than 20 laps. The first notable incident of the month came just before 1:30 p.m. Jimmie Johnson drifted wide in turn 2 and made light contact with the outside wall. Johnson suffered only minor damage and was able to return to the track later in the day. Takuma Sato was once again the fastest driver of the day, both overall and in the no-tow ranking, running a lap at 232.789 mph (374.638 km/h). Tony Kanaan ran the fastest four-lap average – a simulation of a full qualifying run – at 230.517 mph (370.981 km/h). After practice, a random draw was conducted to determine qualifying order, with teams drawing in order of Fast Friday practice results.

Top Practice Speeds
Pos	No.	Driver	Team	Engine	Speed (mph)	Speed (km/h)
1	51	(Japan) Takuma Sato	Dale Coyne Racing w/ Rick Ware Racing	Honda	232.789	374.638
2	27	(United States) Alexander Rossi	Andretti Autosport	Honda	231.883	373.180
3	5	(Mexico) Pato O'Ward	Arrow McLaren SP	Chevrolet	231.798	373.043
OFFICIAL REPORT

== Time Trials ==
=== Qualifying — Saturday, May 21 ===
- Weather: 80 °F (27 °C), mostly cloudy early, scattered thunderstorms later.
- Summary: Time trials on Saturday locked in starting positions 13th–33rd. Cars ranking 1st–12th advanced to the Top 12 Qualifying session on Sunday.

In anticipation of forecast afternoon rain storms, IndyCar officials moved the start of qualifications up one hour to 11:00 a.m. During morning practice, Ed Carpenter set the pace with a blistering lap of 234.410 mph (377.246 km/h), the fastest lap thus far of the month. Several minor incidents dotted the day. Juan Pablo Montoya's car failed pre-qualifying inspection, causing him to lose his guaranteed attempt and was only permitted to run after all others completed their guaranteed attempt. Stefan Wilson also saw pre-qualifying drama, as the engine in his car failed during the morning practice session. Wilson did not make a qualifying attempt, relegating him to starting 33rd for the race.

During qualification runs, Takuma Sato had his first attempt disallowed after he neglected to use the turn three warmup lane on his cool down lap, resulting in him interfering with Marco Andretti's run. Andretti had further issues on his run with engine problems causing him to lose significant time on his third lap. Sato and Andretti would later requalify and improve their times. Sato advanced to the Fast 12 session on Sunday, despite brushing the wall in turn two on his third lap. Andretti's teammate Colton Herta suffered an engine failure on his first attempt and was forced to change engines before making a second run later in the day.

Rain began to fall on the track just before 2:30 p.m. After roughly one hour, the track was dried and two more runs were completed, but more rain began to fall just before 4:00 p.m., with IndyCar calling an end to Saturday qualifications at roughly 4:50 p.m. Rinus VeeKay was the fastest driver of the day, qualifying with a four-lap average of 233.655 mph (376.031 km/h). VeeKay's attempt was the third fastest qualifying run in Indianapolis 500 history.

Pos	No.	Driver	Team	Engine	Speed (mph)	Speed (km/h)
Top 12 Qualifiers
1	21	(Netherlands) Rinus VeeKay	Ed Carpenter Racing	Chevrolet	233.655	376.031
2	5	(Mexico) Pato O'Ward	Arrow McLaren SP	Chevrolet	233.037	375.037
3	7	(Sweden) Felix Rosenqvist	Arrow McLaren SP	Chevrolet	232.775	374.615
4	10	(Spain) Álex Palou	Chip Ganassi Racing	Honda	232.774	374.613
5	1	(Brazil) Tony Kanaan W	Chip Ganassi Racing	Honda	232.625	374.374
6	48	(United States) Jimmie Johnson R	Chip Ganassi Racing	Honda	232.398	374.008
7	33	(United States) Ed Carpenter	Ed Carpenter Racing	Chevrolet	232.397	374.007
8	8	(Sweden) Marcus Ericsson	Chip Ganassi Racing	Honda	232.275	373.810
9	28	(France) Romain Grosjean R	Andretti Autosport	Honda	232.201	373.691
10	9	(New Zealand) Scott Dixon W	Chip Ganassi Racing	Honda	232.151	373.611
11	12	(Australia) Will Power W	Team Penske	Chevrolet	231.842	373.114
12	51	(Japan) Takuma Sato W	Dale Coyne Racing w/ Rick Ware Racing	Honda	231.708	372.898
Positions 13–33
13	18	(United States) David Malukas R	Dale Coyne Racing w/ HMD Motorsports	Honda	231.607	372.735
14	2	(United States) Josef Newgarden	Team Penske	Chevrolet	231.580	372.692
15	23	(United States) Santino Ferrucci	Dreyer & Reinbold Racing	Chevrolet	231.508	372.576
16	60	(France) Simon Pagenaud W	Meyer Shank Racing	Honda	231.275	372.201
17	11	(United States) J. R. Hildebrand	A. J. Foyt Enterprises	Chevrolet	231.112	371.939
18	20	(United States) Conor Daly	Ed Carpenter Racing	Chevrolet	230.999	371.757
19	77	(United Kingdom) Callum Ilott R	Juncos Hollinger Racing	Chevrolet	230.961	371.696
20	27	(United States) Alexander Rossi W	Andretti Autosport	Honda	230.812	371.456
21	15	(United States) Graham Rahal	Rahal Letterman Lanigan Racing	Honda	230.766	371.382
22	24	(United States) Sage Karam	Dreyer & Reinbold Racing	Chevrolet	230.464	370.896
23	98	(United States) Marco Andretti	Andretti Herta Haupert Autosport w/ Marco Andretti and Curb-Agajanian	Honda	230.345	370.704
24	29	(Canada) Devlin DeFrancesco R	Andretti Steinbrenner Autosport	Honda	230.326	370.674
25	26	(United States) Colton Herta	Andretti Autosport	Honda	230.235	370.527
26	3	(New Zealand) Scott McLaughlin	Team Penske	Chevrolet	230.154	370.397
27	06	(Brazil) Hélio Castroneves W	Meyer Shank Racing	Honda	229.630	369.554
28	14	(United States) Kyle Kirkwood R	A. J. Foyt Enterprises	Chevrolet	229.406	369.193
29	4	(Canada) Dalton Kellett	A. J. Foyt Enterprises	Chevrolet	228.916	368.405
30	6	(Colombia) Juan Pablo Montoya W	Arrow McLaren SP	Chevrolet	228.622	367.931
31	30	(Denmark) Christian Lundgaard R	Rahal Letterman Lanigan Racing	Honda	227.053	365.406
32	45	(United Kingdom) Jack Harvey	Rahal Letterman Lanigan Racing	Honda	226.851	365.081
33	25	(United Kingdom) Stefan Wilson	DragonSpeed/Cusick Motorsports	Chevrolet	No time	
OFFICIAL REPORT

=== Qualifying — Sunday May 22 ===
- Weather: 65 °F (18 °C), Mostly cloudy

==== Top 12 qualifying ====
- Summary: Cars ranking 1st–12th from Saturday participated in the Top 12 Qualifying session. After the first round, cars ranking 7th–12th were locked in to those starting positions. The top six cars advanced to the Firestone Fast Six session. Participants in the Top 12 session were given a 90-minute practice session starting at 12 p.m.

The Top 12 session commenced at 4:00 p.m., with each driver permitted one attempt. Drivers took to the track in reverse order of the results from Saturday qualifying. Scott Dixon was the fastest in the Top 12 round, completing a 4-lap average at 233.510 mph (375.798 km/h). Rinus VeeKay, Álex Palou, Marcus Ericsson, Ed Carpenter, and Tony Kanaan also advanced to the Fast Six round. There were no incidents, though Jimmie Johnson nearly lost control of his car on his run, resulting in him being last of the top 12. After the conclusion of the session, those that qualified for the Fast Six shootout were given a five-minute period behind the pace car to cool their engines down for the next run.

Top 12 Qualifying
Fast Six Qualifiers
Pos	No.	Driver	Team	Engine	Speed (mph)	Speed (km/h)
1	9	(New Zealand) Scott Dixon W	Chip Ganassi Racing	Honda	233.510	375.798
2	21	(Netherlands) Rinus VeeKay	Ed Carpenter Racing	Chevrolet	233.429	375.668
3	10	(Spain) Álex Palou	Chip Ganassi Racing	Honda	233.347	375.536
4	8	(Sweden) Marcus Ericsson	Chip Ganassi Racing	Honda	233.166	375.244
5	33	(United States) Ed Carpenter	Ed Carpenter Racing	Chevrolet	233.073	375.095
6	1	(Brazil) Tony Kanaan W	Chip Ganassi Racing	Honda	233.022	375.013
Positions 7–12
7	5	(Mexico) Pato O'Ward	Arrow McLaren SP	Chevrolet	232.705	374.502
8	7	(Sweden) Felix Rosenqvist	Arrow McLaren SP	Chevrolet	232.182	373.661
9	28	(France) Romain Grosjean R	Andretti Autosport	Honda	231.999	373.366
10	51	(Japan) Takuma Sato W	Dale Coyne Racing w/ Rick Ware Racing	Honda	231.670	372.837
11	12	(Australia) Will Power W	Team Penske	Chevrolet	231.534	372.618
12	48	(United States) Jimmie Johnson R	Chip Ganassi Racing	Honda	231.264	372.183
OFFICIAL REPORT

==== Fast Six qualifying ====
- Summary: The Firestone Fast Six session determined starting positions 1st–6th. Running commenced at roughly 5:15 p.m. Scott Dixon set a new record for fastest pole speed for the Indianapolis 500 with a four-lap average of 234.046 mph (376.661 km/h), besting the previous mark set by Scott Brayton in 1996. It was also the second-fastest qualifying run ever, only behind the mark set by Arie Luyendyk, also in 1996. It also marked a new record for the fastest front row in Speedway history, with the front row starters, Dixon, Álex Palou, and Rinus VeeKay, averaging 233.643 mph (376.012 km/h) between them. It was Dixon's fifth career pole position for the Indianapolis 500, moving him to second all-time behind Rick Mears.

Firestone Fast Six Qualifying
Pos	No.	Driver	Team	Engine	Speed (mph)	Speed (km/h)
1	9	(New Zealand) Scott Dixon W	Chip Ganassi Racing	Honda	234.046	376.661
2	10	(Spain) Álex Palou	Chip Ganassi Racing	Honda	233.499	375.780
3	21	(Netherlands) Rinus VeeKay	Ed Carpenter Racing	Chevrolet	233.385	375.597
4	33	(United States) Ed Carpenter	Ed Carpenter Racing	Chevrolet	233.080	375.106
5	8	(Sweden) Marcus Ericsson	Chip Ganassi Racing	Honda	232.764	374.597
6	1	(Brazil) Tony Kanaan W	Chip Ganassi Racing	Honda	232.372	373.966
OFFICIAL REPORT

== Post-Qualifying practice ==
=== Post-qualifying practice — Monday, May 23 ===
- Weather: 65 °F (18 °C), mostly cloudy.
- Summary: Following qualifying, teams returned to race day levels of turbo boost for practice. A two-hour session was scheduled for Monday, with the track opening at 1:00 p.m. The first major incident of the month came just before 2:30 p.m. Dalton Kellett lost control of his car in turn one after being overtaken, resulting in him heavily impacting the outside wall and momentarily lifting onto two wheels from the impact. Kellett was uninjured in the accident. Chip Ganassi Racing entries took the top three speeds in practice, with Álex Palou fastest of all, running a lap at 229.441 mph (369.249 km/h).

Top Practice Speeds
Pos	No.	Driver	Team	Engine	Speed (mph)	Speed (km/h)
1	10	(Spain) Álex Palou	Chip Ganassi Racing	Honda	229.441	369.249
2	9	(New Zealand) Scott Dixon	Chip Ganassi Racing	Honda	229.000	368.540
3	48	(United States) Jimmie Johnson R	Chip Ganassi Racing	Honda	228.467	367.682
OFFICIAL REPORT

=== Carb Day — Friday, May 27 ===
- Weather: 69 °F (21 °C), light rain showers in the morning, cloudy in the afternoon.
- Summary: The final practice was initially scheduled for 11:00 a.m., but due to rain showers in the morning, practice was delayed to 1:00 p.m., with teams allowed a 1-hour 30 minute session. Two major incidents occurred during practice. At roughly 1:45 p.m., Santino Ferrucci and David Malukas made contact entering turn 1. The contact cut down a tire on Malukas's car, causing him to lose control and impact the outside wall. Malukas was uninjured in the incident, while Ferrucci was held on pit lane for 20 minutes as penalty for avoidable contact with Malukas. The second major incident came at roughly 2:05 p.m. Colton Herta lost control of his car at the exit of turn 1, spun, and impacted the outside wall. The impact lifted the front of the car off the ground, allowing the front to pitch up and blow the car over. The car landed upside down and skidded to a halt in turn 2. Herta was uninjured in the accident, but was forced to move to a backup car for the race. Tony Kanaan was the fastest driver of the shortened session, running a lap at 227.114 mph (365.505 km/h). After the practice session, participating crews moved on to the annual Pit Stop Challenge which returned for the first time since 2019 as it was not held in 2020 and 2021 due to the global COVID-19 pandemic.

Top Practice Speeds
Pos	No.	Driver	Team	Engine	Speed (mph)	Speed (km/h)
1	1	(Brazil) Tony Kanaan	Chip Ganassi Racing	Honda	227.114	365.505
2	8	(Sweden) Marcus Ericsson	Chip Ganassi Racing	Honda	227.004	365.328
3	51	(Japan) Takuma Sato	Dale Coyne Racing w/ Rick Ware Racing	Honda	226.839	365.062
OFFICIAL REPORT

=== Pit Stop Challenge ===
The 43rd annual Pit Stop Challenge was held on Friday May 27. The event returned to the Carb Day schedule for the first time since 2019. The event was scheduled to start at 2:30 p.m., after Carb Day practice had concluded, but was delayed to 3:30 due to early weather holds. A total of 14 teams were invited to participate. Colton Herta's team was entered, but withdrew after Herta's crash during the earlier practice session. Team Penske won the pit stop challenge with Josef Newgarden's car, winning the best-of-three final against Chip Ganassi Racing with Scott Dixon's car. It was Penske's 18th win in the competition and the third for chief mechanic Travis Law. One incident occurred during the challenge when Sage Karam spun and nearly collided with Felix Rosenqvist in the first round when his Dreyer & Reinbold Racing team failed to secure a tire on his car.

Round 1
10	Álex Palou (Chip Ganassi Racing)	12.652
12	Will Power (Team Penske)	13.553
45	Jack Harvey (Rahal Letterman)	N/A
26	Colton Herta (Andretti Autosport)	Withdrew
5	Pato O'Ward (Arrow McLaren SP)	12.493
23	Santino Ferrucci (Dreyer & Reinbold)	13.362
7	Felix Rosenqvist (Arrow McLaren SP)	12.883
24	Sage Karam (Dreyer & Reinbold)	27.995
28	Romain Grosjean (Andretti Autosport)	13.796
20	Conor Daly (Ed Carpenter Racing)	14.970

Quarterfinals
2	Josef Newgarden (Team Penske)	11.561
10	Álex Palou (Chip Ganassi Racing)	11.746
45	Jack Harvey (Rahal Letterman)	16.183
5	Pato O'Ward (Arrow McLaren SP)	15.316
9	Scott Dixon (Chip Ganassi Racing)	12.581
7	Felix Rosenqvist (Arrow McLaren SP)	13.194
15	Graham Rahal (Rahal Letterman)	12.759
28	Romain Grosjean (Andretti Autosport)	15.598

Semifinals
2	Josef Newgarden (Team Penske)	11.569
5	Pato O'Ward (Arrow McLaren SP)	12.471
9	Scott Dixon (Chip Ganassi Racing)	11.737
15	Graham Rahal (Rahal Letterman)	19.393

Finals (best of 3)
2	Josef Newgarden (Team Penske)	7.588	10.949	N/A	2
9	Scott Dixon (Chip Ganassi Racing)	8.840	11.911	N/A	0

== Starting grid ==
Row	Inside		Middle		Outside	
1	9	(New Zealand) Scott Dixon W	10	(Spain) Álex Palou	21	(Netherlands) Rinus VeeKay
2	33	(United States) Ed Carpenter	8	(Sweden) Marcus Ericsson	1	(Brazil) Tony Kanaan W
3	5	(Mexico) Pato O'Ward	7	(Sweden) Felix Rosenqvist	28	(France) Romain Grosjean R
4	51	(Japan) Takuma Sato W	12	(Australia) Will Power W	48	(United States) Jimmie Johnson R
5	18	(United States) David Malukas R	2	(United States) Josef Newgarden	23	(United States) Santino Ferrucci
6	60	(France) Simon Pagenaud W	11	(United States) J. R. Hildebrand	20	(United States) Conor Daly
7	77	(United Kingdom) Callum Ilott R	27	(United States) Alexander Rossi W	15	(United States) Graham Rahal
8	24	(United States) Sage Karam	98	(United States) Marco Andretti	29	(Canada) Devlin DeFrancesco R
9	26	(United States) Colton Herta	3	(New Zealand) Scott McLaughlin	06	(Brazil) Hélio Castroneves W
10	14	(United States) Kyle Kirkwood R	4	(Canada) Dalton Kellett	6	(Colombia) Juan Pablo Montoya W
11	30	(Denmark) Christian Lundgaard R	45	(United Kingdom) Jack Harvey	25	(United Kingdom) Stefan Wilson

R Indianapolis 500 rookie
W Indianapolis 500 winner

== Race report ==
Starting line up taking the first pace car lap at the 2022 Indianapolis 500.

- Weather: 81 °F (27 °C), Partly cloudy with moderate sustained winds.

=== First half ===
At the start, Álex Palou took the early lead of the race, with Rinus VeeKay and Scott Dixon behind. Dixon eventually passed VeeKay for second, allowing him and his teammate Palou to exchange positions regularly to drive to conserve fuel. These three remained at the front through to the first pit stops, which came around lap 31. After pit stops, VeeKay emerged ahead of Dixon for second. On lap 39, VeeKay caused the race's first caution period after losing control of his car in turn two and impacting the outside wall. VeeKay was uninjured, but was relegated to finishing 33rd and last. After the accident, Chip Ganassi Racing cars ran 1–2–3, with Palou leading Dixon and Marcus Ericsson.

Racing resumed on lap 47, with Palou and Dixon resuming their attempt at fuel conservation. This continued to the second round of pit stops, which began at roughly lap 67. Just as the first stops began happening, Callum Ilott lost control of his car in turn two and impacted the outside wall before skidding back across the track and making light contact with the inside wall on the backstraight. Ilott suffered broken bones in his right hand, but was able to climb from the car unassisted. The injuries would force Ilott to miss the next race of the IndyCar season. The incident brought out the race's second caution period. Race leader Álex Palou was worst effected by the timing of the caution. Palou entered pit lane just after it closed for the caution, forcing him to drive through without taking service. Two laps later, with the pits still closed, Palou was forced to take emergency service to prevent running out of fuel, with the penalty being starting at the end of the field for the restart. The sequence took Palou out of contention for the win for the remainder of the race. Everyone else who had not pitted before the caution came in once the pits opened. Scott Dixon assumed the lead of the race, having stopped just before Ilott's crash, while Conor Daly vaulted up the order to second.

Racing resumed at lap 78, with Dixon maintaining his lead over Daly. At lap 80, Daly overtook Dixon for the lead, but only led for a few laps before Dixon returned to the front. The running order remained largely the same to halfway. At the halfway mark, Scott Dixon held the lead over Daly, Pato O'Ward, Marcus Ericsson, and Tony Kanaan.

=== Second half ===
The third caution period of the race came out on lap 106, when Romain Grosjean lost control of his car in turn two and impacted the outside wall. Grosjean was uninjured in the accident. During the caution, the majority of the field pitted again, with Scott Dixon being first out of the pits. Dixon would line up second for the restart behind Conor Daly, who had pitted just before the caution.

Racing got under way once again on lap 112. On the restart, Pato O'Ward passed both Daly and Dixon to take the lead of the race, while Santino Ferrucci moved into the top-five positions after passing several cars. Dixon quickly took the lead from O'Ward, with O'Ward settling in behind in a bid to conserve fuel. Daly ran third, Ferrucci fourth, and Felix Rosenqvist fifth. At lap 141, the penultimate round of pit stops began. O'Ward emerged from the pits with the lead over Dixon, while O'Ward's teammate Rosenqvist moved to third.

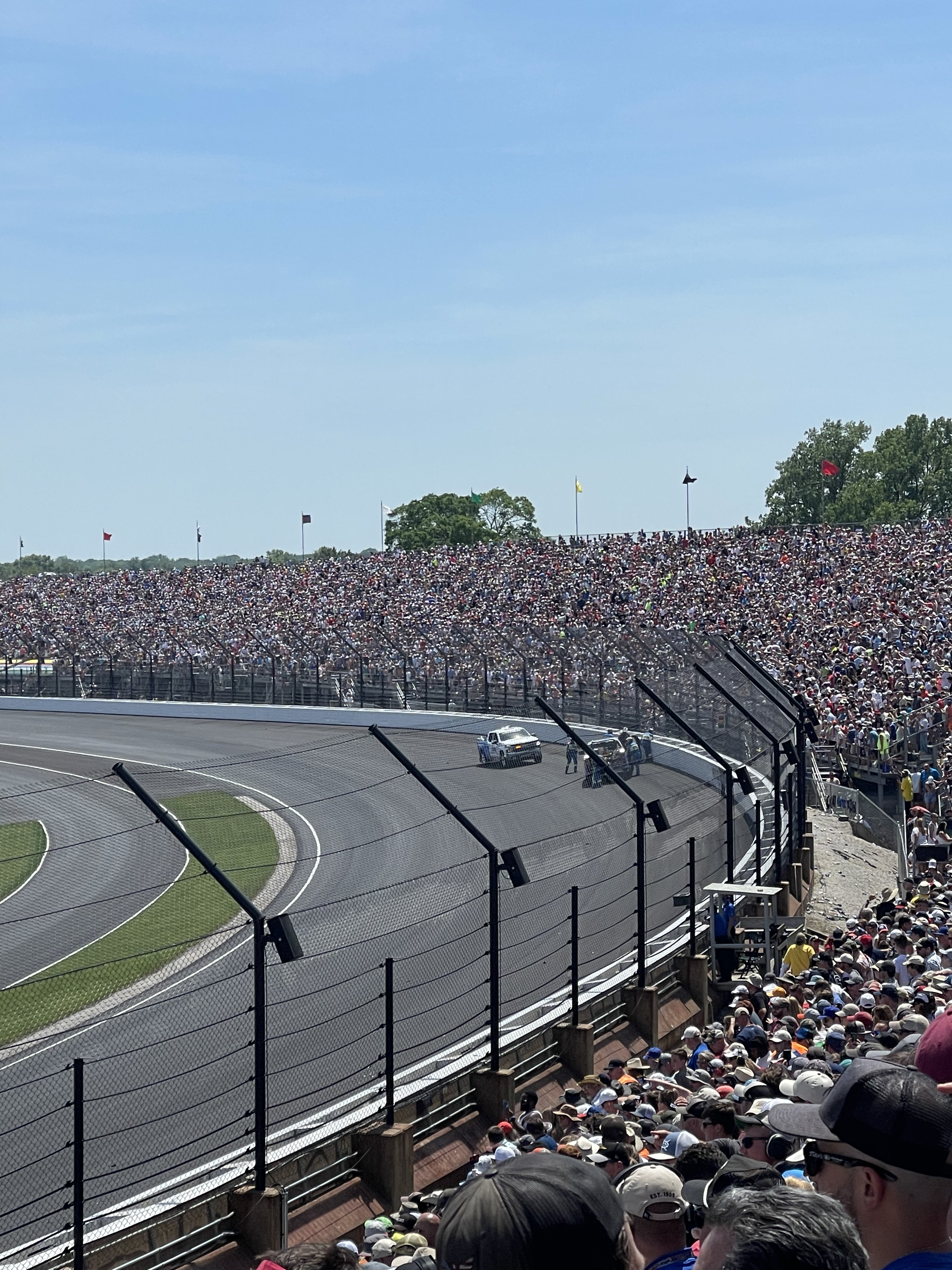
Scott McLaughlin's car and emergency crews in turn four.

The fourth caution period of the day came at lap 151, when Scott McLaughlin lost control of his car in turn three. McLaughlin impacted the outside wall, then continued to slide into turn four before impacting the wall again and nearly collecting Ed Carpenter in the incident. McLaughlin emerged uninjured in the wreck and later indicated that he had been caught out by the wind, which had increased since the start of the race.

Racing resumed at lap 158, with Dixon immediately passing O'Ward to take over the lead again, with Felix Rosenqvist third, Conor Daly fourth, and Marcus Ericsson fifth. This order remained the same until the final round of pit stops, which began at roughly lap 173. Dixon pitted from the lead on lap 175, but locked the rear tires entering the lane, causing him to be over the pit lane speed limit at the pit entry line. Dixon received a drive-through penalty for the mistake, removing him from contention to win despite leading nearly half of the race. With Dixon removed from the lead battle, the front pack now consisted of O'Ward, Felix Rosenqvist, and Dixon's teammate Marcus Ericsson, who had gained substantially on the Arrow McLaren SP cars during the pit sequence. Ericsson moved around O'Ward and Rosenqvist and began to pull away while dealing with slower lapped traffic. Marco Andretti and Jimmie Johnson briefly lead ahead of this group, but were on an alternate pit strategy and both pitted by lap 190, handing the lead to Ericsson.

=== Finish ===
The fifth caution period of the day came at lap 194, when Jimmie Johnson lost control of his car in turn two after entering too low, causing him to impact the outside wall. Johnson was uninjured in the accident. In an effort to ensure the race did not finish under a caution period, IndyCar officials stopped the race to clean up the wreckage, setting up a two-lap shootout to the end. At the red flag, Ericsson led O'Ward, Tony Kanaan, Rosenqvist, and Alexander Rossi.

Racing resumed on lap 199, with Rosenqvist diving to the inside of Kanaan on the restart, allowing Ericsson and O'Ward to gap the duo down the backstretch. Ericsson started weaving across the track in an effort to break the draft that O'Ward would get. On the final lap, O'Ward drew even with Ericsson entering turn one, but was unable to execute a pass. As the leaders reached turn three for the final time, the sixth and final caution period came as Sage Karam impacted the wall in turn two and skidded to a halt on the backstraight grass. Karam was sent to a local hospital after complaining of musculoskeletal soreness, but was released shortly thereafter with no injuries. The caution period effectively ended the race, with Marcus Ericsson taking his first Indianapolis 500 victory.

Ericsson's victory was the second for a driver from Sweden, after Kenny Bräck's win in 1999. It was the fifth Indianapolis 500 victory for the Chip Ganassi Racing team, but its first since 2012. For winning, Ericsson earned $3.1 million from a record purse of $16,000,200. Despite his late race accident, Jimmie Johnson was elected Rookie of the Year. The decision to award Johnson Rookie of the Year honors was divisive, with several motor racing journalists as well as some competitors suggesting that David Malukas – the highest finishing rookie in 16th – was more deserving of the award.

During the course of the race, Scott Dixon set a new record for Most career laps led in the Indianapolis 500. By leading 95 laps during the race, Dixon reached 665 total career laps led, surpassing the previous mark set by Al Unser of 644 laps led.

== Box score ==
Finish	No.	Driver	Team	Chassis	Engine	Laps	Status	Pit Stops	Grid	Pts.^{1}
1	8	(Sweden) Marcus Ericsson	Chip Ganassi Racing	Dallara UAK18	Honda	200	175.428 mph	5	5	109
2	5	(Mexico) Pato O'Ward	Arrow McLaren SP	Dallara UAK18	Chevrolet	200	+1.7929	5	7	87
3	1	(Brazil) Tony Kanaan W	Chip Ganassi Racing	Dallara UAK18	Honda	200	+3.5173	5	6	78
4	7	(Sweden) Felix Rosenqvist	Arrow McLaren SP	Dallara UAK18	Chevrolet	200	+4.1267	5	8	69
5	27	(United States) Alexander Rossi W	Andretti Autosport	Dallara UAK18	Honda	200	+4.9804	5	20	60
6	20	(United States) Conor Daly	Ed Carpenter Racing	Dallara UAK18	Chevrolet	200	+5.0799	5	18	57
7	06	(Brazil) Hélio Castroneves W	Meyer Shank Racing	Dallara UAK18	Honda	200	+6.5614	5	27	52
8	60	(France) Simon Pagenaud W	Meyer Shank Racing	Dallara UAK18	Honda	200	+7.0937	5	16	48
9	10	(Spain) Álex Palou	Chip Ganassi Racing	Dallara UAK18	Honda	200	+8.2446	7	2	56
10	23	(United States) Santino Ferrucci	Dreyer & Reinbold Racing	Dallara UAK18	Chevrolet	200	+9.8329	5	15	40
11	6	(Colombia) Juan Pablo Montoya W	Arrow McLaren SP	Dallara UAK18	Chevrolet	200	+10.7647	5	30	38
12	11	(United States) J. R. Hildebrand	A. J. Foyt Enterprises	Dallara UAK18	Chevrolet	200	+11.6554	6	17	36
13	2	(United States) Josef Newgarden	Team Penske	Dallara UAK18	Chevrolet	200	+11.8276	6	14	34
14	15	(United States) Graham Rahal	Rahal Letterman Lanigan Racing	Dallara UAK18	Honda	200	+12.4253	5	21	32
15	12	(Australia) Will Power W	Team Penske	Dallara UAK18	Chevrolet	200	+13.3036	6	11	32
16	18	(United States) David Malukas R	Dale Coyne Racing w/ HMD Motorsports	Dallara UAK18	Honda	200	+13.6283	5	13	28
17	14	(United States) Kyle Kirkwood R	A. J. Foyt Enterprises	Dallara UAK18	Chevrolet	200	+14.5864	6	28	26
18	30	(Denmark) Christian Lundgaard R	Rahal Letterman Lanigan Racing	Dallara UAK18	Honda	200	+16.3308	6	31	24
19	33	(United States) Ed Carpenter	Ed Carpenter Racing	Dallara UAK18	Chevrolet	200	+16.5602	5	4	31
20	29	(Canada) Devlin DeFrancesco R	Andretti Steinbrenner Autosport	Dallara UAK18	Honda	200	+16.8218	5	24	20
21	9	(New Zealand) Scott Dixon W	Chip Ganassi Racing	Dallara UAK18	Honda	200	+18.1238	5	1	33
22	98	(United States) Marco Andretti	Andretti Herta Haupert Autosport w/ Marco Andretti and Curb-Agajanian	Dallara UAK18	Honda	200	+25.2002	7	23	17
23	24	(United States) Sage Karam	Dreyer & Reinbold Racing	Dallara UAK18	Chevrolet	199	Accident	5	22	14
24	45	(United Kingdom) Jack Harvey	Rahal Letterman Lanigan Racing	Dallara UAK18	Honda	199	-1 Lap	8	32	12
25	51	(Japan) Takuma Sato W	Dale Coyne Racing w/ Rick Ware Racing	Dallara UAK18	Honda	199	-1 Lap	6	10	13
26	25	(United Kingdom) Stefan Wilson	DragonSpeed/Cusick Motorsports	Dallara UAK18	Chevrolet	198	-2 Laps	7	33	10
27	4	(Canada) Dalton Kellett	A. J. Foyt Enterprises	Dallara UAK18	Chevrolet	198	-2 Laps	7	29	10
28	48	(United States) Jimmie Johnson R	Chip Ganassi Racing	Dallara UAK18	Honda	193	Accident	7	12	12
29	3	(New Zealand) Scott McLaughlin	Team Penske	Dallara UAK18	Chevrolet	150	Accident	4	26	10
30	26	(United States) Colton Herta	Andretti Autosport	Dallara UAK18	Honda	129	Throttle Sensor	6	25	10
31	28	(France) Romain Grosjean R	Andretti Autosport	Dallara UAK18	Honda	105	Accident	2	9	14
32	77	(United Kingdom) Callum Ilott R	Juncos Hollinger Racing	Dallara UAK18	Chevrolet	68	Accident	1	19	10
33	21	(Netherlands) Rinus VeeKay	Ed Carpenter Racing	Dallara UAK18	Chevrolet	38	Accident	1	3	21
OFFICIAL REPORT

W Former Indianapolis 500 winner

R Indianapolis 500 Rookie

All entrants utilized Firestone tires.

^{1} Points include qualification points from time trials, 1 point for leading a lap, and 2 points for most laps led.

=== Race statistics ===
Lap Leaders
Laps	Leader
1–7	Álex Palou
8–9	Scott Dixon
10–12	Álex Palou
13–16	Scott Dixon
17–21	Álex Palou
22–29	Scott Dixon
30	Álex Palou
31	Rinus VeeKay
32	Marcus Ericsson
33–35	Pato O'Ward
36–47	Álex Palou
48–50	Scott Dixon
51	Álex Palou
52–53	Scott Dixon
54–57	Álex Palou
58–59	Scott Dixon
60–68	Álex Palou
69–72	Pato O'Ward
73–79	Scott Dixon
80–81	Conor Daly

Lap Leaders (con't)
Laps	Leader
82–83	Scott Dixon
84–85	Conor Daly
86–108	Scott Dixon
109–111	Conor Daly
112–140	Scott Dixon
141–143	Pato O'Ward
144	Tony Kanaan
145	Marcus Ericsson
146–147	Álex Palou
148–157	Pato O'Ward
158–160	Scott Dixon
161–164	Pato O'Ward
165–174	Scott Dixon
175–176	Pato O'Ward
177–181	Tony Kanaan
182–184	Álex Palou
185–187	Marco Andretti
188–189	Jimmie Johnson
190–200	Marcus Ericsson

Total laps led
Driver	Laps
Scott Dixon	95
Álex Palou	47
Pato O'Ward	26
Marcus Ericsson	13
Conor Daly	7
Tony Kanaan	6
Marco Andretti	3
Jimmie Johnson	2
Rinus VeeKay	1

Cautions: 6 for 31 laps
Laps	Reason
39–46	Rinus VeeKay crash in turn 2
69–76	Callum Ilott crash in turn 2
106–111	Romain Grosjean crash in turn 2
152–157	Scott McLaughlin crash in turn 4
195–197	Jimmie Johnson crash in turn 2 (red flag)
200	Sage Karam crash in turn 2

== Broadcasting ==
=== Television ===
The race was televised on NBC and Peacock Premium in the United States. The terrestrial television broadcast was subject to blackout in Central Indiana. The streaming broadcast on Peacock was not subject to blackout, as the platform does not currently have the ability to enforce such restrictions at a local level. NBC received special consent from IMS to stream the race within the blackout region for 2022 only, under the presumption that the required capabilities would be implemented prior to the 2023 race. This was only the sixth time in race history that the race was available to be seen live in the Central Indiana market.

Former driver James Hinchcliffe joined the NBC broadcast team for 2022 as a color commentator, replacing Paul Tracy, who had been in the role for the previous three years for the race.

On May 4, NBC announced their full crew for the race broadcast. Mike Tirico and Danica Patrick returned as the hosts for pre-race and post-race coverage, while Dale Earnhardt Jr. and Rutledge Wood returned for pre-race coverage. Tirico, Patrick, and Earnhardt were also announced as part of the "Peacock Pit Box" crew for mid-race coverage. Dillon Welch joined the crew as a pit reporter, replacing Kelli Stavast, who had been part of NBC's coverage since 2019.

NBC
Booth announcers	Pre/Post-race	Pit/garage reporters
Announcer: Leigh Diffey; Color: Townsend Bell; Color: James Hinchcliffe	NBC Host: Mike Tirico; Studio Analyst: Danica Patrick; Analyst/Features: Dale Earnhardt Jr. Features: Rutledge Wood	Marty Snider; Dillon Welch; Dave Burns; Kevin Lee

=== Radio ===
The race was carried by the IndyCar Radio Network. The chief announcer or "Voice of the 500" for the seventh consecutive year was Mark Jaynes with Davey Hamilton as driver analyst.

IndyCar Radio Network
Booth Announcers	Turn Reporters	Pit/garage reporters
Chief Announcer: Mark Jaynes; Driver expert: Davey Hamilton	Turn 1: Nick Yeoman; Turn 2: Michael Young; Turn 3: Jake Query; Turn 4: Chris Denari	Alex Wollf; Scott Sander; Rob Blackman; Ryan Myrehn

Previous race: 2022 GMR Grand Prix	IndyCar Series; 2022 season	Next race: 2022 Chevrolet Detroit Grand Prix
Previous race: 2021 Indianapolis 500	Indianapolis 500	Next race: 2023 Indianapolis 500
