= David Jensen =

Danish-Canadian-British radio DJ (born 1950)

- Born: David Allan Jensen; 4 July 1950 (age 76); Victoria, British Columbia, Canada
- Other name: Kid Jensen
- Occupations: DJ; Radio presenter
- Years active: 1968–present
- Spouse: Gudrún Ágústa Thórarinsdóttir (m. 1977)
- Children: 3, including Viktor

David Allan Jensen (born 4 July 1950) is a Canadian-born British radio DJ and television presenter. Born in Victoria, British Columbia, Jensen began as a radio DJ on Radio Luxembourg. Jensen was later a broadcaster for the BBC from 1976 to 1984, as a host on BBC Radio 1 and presenter on the TV music programme Top of the Pops from 1976 to 1984. Jensen has also hosted and presented for Capital FM and ITV among other stations.

== Early career ==
Born into a Danish-origin family residing in Victoria, British Columbia, Jensen began his career in his home country at the age of sixteen playing jazz and classical music on CJOV-FM, in Kelowna, on a show called Music For Dining, which was sponsored a lot of the time by a number of local funeral parlours. He then joined Radio Luxembourg at the age of eighteen in November 1968, joining Paul Kay, Paul Burnett, Noel Edmonds and Tony Prince as the resident DJ team. His recruitment was part of the "all-live" initiative, bringing to an end most of the pre-recorded shows.

His initial slot was 1 to 3 a.m. Monday to Thursday, and 7 to 9 p.m. Sundays, but was quickly promoted at the start of 1969 to an earlier slot, mostly starting at 9 p.m. Being only 18 years old, Paul Burnett affectionately called him the "kid" and the name "Kid" Jensen was being widely used in newspaper listings by February 1969. From May 1970, he presented a popular progressive rock show, typically broadcast at midnight or 1 a.m., later billed as "Dimensions" which resulted in a big increase in listeners to this slot.

By 1974, Jensen was becoming a TV personality in Britain, hosting pop shows on ITV (including music quiz show Pop Quest), and in the mid-1970s he worked for the then-new Radio Trent (now Capital East Midlands) in Nottingham, one of the first legal, land-based commercial radio stations in the UK. During the early part of his career he was billed as "Kid Jensen" and did not use his given name professionally until 1980.

== Broadcasting/acting career ==
=== BBC Radio 1 ===
In 1976 he joined the BBC's pop network, Radio 1, initially hosting a Saturday morning show from 10 to midday, but sitting in for many other DJs, and eventually graduating to a weekday late afternoon/early evening show in the spring of 1978 from 4:30 to 7:00 p.m. He kept his profile high through regular appearances presenting Top of the Pops, and championed a number of acts who went on to achieve huge commercial success, including The Police and Gary Numan.

After his 29 May 1980 radio show, Jensen left the BBC to work for the Turner Broadcasting System WTBS cable superstation in Atlanta, Georgia, where he was host of the 10:00 p.m. news. On 12 October 1981, Jensen returned to BBC Radio 1 with a new weekday evening show from 8 – 10 p.m. The show was later extended to run from 7 – 10 p.m. Soon afterwards he dropped the "Kid" name, although he remained popularly known by it for many years after and would reinstate it in the late-1990s. His mid-evening show was dominated by indie-rock, but also featured interviews with mainstream acts such as Duran Duran, and was the first show to champion Frankie Goes to Hollywood, before their commercial success. He remained a regular Top of the Pops presenter. He also wrote a pop column for the Daily Mirror.

=== Capital Radio ===
In 1984, Jensen left Radio 1 and joined London's Capital FM, presenting the weekday mid-morning show (replacing Michael Aspel); moving to weekday drivetime in 1987. In addition to his weekday shows he also presented the weekly The Network Chart Show, the UK's first syndicated commercial radio show which originally went out every Sunday between 5 p.m. and 7 p.m., competing directly with Radio 1's Top 40 show.

While presenting the Network Chart, Jensen became ITV's unofficial "face" of pop music, presenting pop shows such as The Roxy, an attempt to compete with Top of the Pops. He continued to comment regularly on pop-related stories in ITN and Sky News bulletins for some time after he left the Network Chart in 1993, when he was replaced by Neil Fox. Jensen continued to present the weekday drivetime show on Capital FM until 1998.

He also presented various children's programmes including Worldwise and Popquest.

=== Recent years ===
In 1998, Jensen joined rival London FM station, Heart 106.2, presenting the weekday drivetime show from 4 pm to 7 pm. He also presented a Sunday afternoon CD chart show called Kid Jensen's CD Countdown which was produced by Blue Revolution and networked on Birmingham's 100.7 Heart FM and various other stations.

In 2002, Jensen returned to Capital and was heard on its oldies service Capital Gold. First presenting the Monday–Thursday late night show from 10 p.m. – 1 a.m., before taking over the weekday mid-morning slot in February 2003, then the breakfast show, (co-hosted with Erika North). Jensen later moved to the late morning slot 10 a.m. – 1 p.m. Jensen teamed up with Capital Radio Producer Craig Kingham to present the Saturday morning show. Jensen left Gold in December 2010.

In September 2008, Jensen hosted the evening show of Planet Rock (7-11p.m.) as a stand-in for Nicky Horne. He also hosted Planet Rock's Sunday Morning show, "Another Dimension", and co-hosted with Rick Wakeman on Saturday mornings until December 2010 and briefly hosted the Saturday morning 10 a.m. – 1 p.m. show on his own, until he left the station in April 2011.

Jensen joined Smooth Radio in April 2011 to present an afternoon show. In April 2012, he took over the Smooth Drive Home slot (Mondays to Friday, 4p.m. – 8p.m.) from Carlos. Jensen also hosted a two-hour retro chart show on Smooth Radio on Sunday evenings. Smooth was acquired by Global Radio in 2013. Following a studio and business move to Global headquarters in Leicester Square, Jensen was dropped from the schedules on 19 December 2013.

In February 2021, he joined Jazz FM for a six week run of Sunday evening programmes named David Jensen's Jazz in partnership with Parkinson's UK. Also that month, he began a weekly show on the newly launched Boom Radio, on Friday nights called Kid Jensen's 70s. In February 2022, David Jensen's Jazz returned to Jazz FM for a second series and a third in April 2023.

== Personal life ==
Jensen is married to Iceland-born Gudrún Ágústa Thórarinsdóttir (Icelandic: Guðrún Ágústa Þórarinsdóttir), and they have three children. Their youngest son, Viktor, a racing driver, both competed in and was also a National Class winner in the 2007 British and International Formula 3 Championship. Jensen also founded the Kid Jensen Racing team that briefly raced in the Formula 3000 championship, which won one race at the hands of Nicolas Minassian in 1999 at Silverstone.

A Freemason, he is a member of Chelsea Lodge No. 3098, the membership of which is made up of entertainers.

In 2010 he became a Freeman of the City of London and was inducted into the UK Radio Hall of Fame.

Jensen is a fan of Crystal Palace, is chairman of the Crystal Palace F.C. Vice-President's Club, and also acted as ambassador for the CPFC 2010 consortium during the purchase of the club from administrators.

It was announced on 16 January 2018 that Jensen had decided to go public about living with Parkinson's disease for the previous five years.
