= Keene (surname) =

Keene is a surname. Notable people with the surname include:

- Alfred Keene (1873–1955), British Olympic fencer
- Alfred John Keene (1864–1930), British watercolour artist
- Barry Keene (born 1938), American politician (California)
- Sir Benjamin Keene (1697–1757), British diplomat
- Bill Keene (1927–2000), American television and radio personality
- Brian Keene (born 1967), American author, primarily of horror and crime fiction
- Carolyn Keene, pseudonym used 1930–85 by the authors of the Nancy Drew and the Dana Girls mystery stories
- Charles Keene (disambiguation), multiple people
- Christopher Keene (1946–95), American classical music conductor
- Constance Keene (1921–2005), American classical pianist
- Dalton Keene (born 1999), American football player
- Daniel Keene (born 1955), Australian playwright
- David Keene (born 1945), American former President of the National Rifle Association
- Sir David Keene, a British Lord Justice of Appeal
- Dennis Keene (born 1965), American politician (Kentucky)
- Derek Keene (1942–2021), English urban historian
- Donald Keene (1922–2019), American scholar, historian, teacher, writer and translator of Japanese
- Doug Keene (1928–86), English footballer
- Elodie Keene (born 1949), American film and television director, producer and editor
- Emily Keene (1849–1944), British expatriate and writer
- Edmund Keene (1714–81), English churchman and academic
- Foxhall P. Keene (1867–1941), American owner and breeder of thoroughbred race horses, World and Olympic gold medallist at polo
- Henry Keene (1726–76), English architect
- Henry George Keene (1826–1915) (1826–1915), English historian of mediaeval and modern India
- James Keene (disambiguation), multiple people
- Jasmine Keene (born 1987), Australian netball player
- Jean Keene ("The Eagle Lady", 1923–2009), American rodeo trick rider
- John Keene (disambiguation), multiple people
- Joseph Keene (1839–1921), American Medal of Honor recipient
- Judith Keene (active 1977–2008), Commandant of Cadets at the U.S. Coast Guard Academy
- Katy Keene, strip cartoon character created by Bill Woggon in 1945
- M. Lamar Keene (1936–96), American spirit medium
- Laura Keene (1826–73), British stage actor and manager
- Laurie Keene (born 1961), Australian rules footballer
- Marcus Keene (born 1995), American basketball player
- Marion Keene (Marion Davis, active early 1950s–after 1998), British big-band vocalist
- Mary Lucas Keene (1885–1977), British professor of anatomy
- Mimi Keene (born 1998), British actress
- Nelson Keene (born Malcolm Holland, 1942), British pop singer
- Noah Keene (born 2008), Physicist
- Nietzchka Keene (1952–2004), American film director and writer
- Paul K. Keene (1910–2005), American organic farming pioneer
- Percival Keene, coming-of-age adventure novel published in three volumes in 1842 by Frederick Marryat
- Ralph Keene (1902–1963), Indian-born British screenwriter, producer and film director
- Raymond Keene (born 1948), English chess Grandmaster
- Richard Keene (1825–94), British photographer
- Rick Keene (Richard J. "Rick" Keene, born 1957), American politician (California)
- Spec Keene (Roy S. "Spec" Keene, 1894–1977), American college sports coach
- Steve Keene (born 1957), American artist
- Tom Keene (disambiguation), multiple people
- Violet Keene (1893–1987), Canadian photographer
- William Keene (1915–1992), American television actor

== See also ==
- Allan Perry-Keene (1898–1987), British military airman
- Keane (disambiguation)
- Keen (surname)
- Kene, another name
