= Keen (surname) =

Keen is an English surname. It is either a nickname surname for someone who is brave, or from the Middle English or Old English personal name Kene, which means king. Alternatively, it can be a variation of the Irish surname O'Cahan.

== Notable people with this name include ==
- Alan Keen (1937–2011), British politician
- Andrew Keen (born c. 1960), British-American entrepreneur and author
- Ann Keen (born 1948), British politician
- Arthur Keen (businessman) (1835–1915), British entrepreneur
- Arthur Keen (aviator) (1895–1918), British World War I flying ace
- Dafne Keen (born 2005), British-Spanish actress
- Dan Keen, American business executive
- Diane Keen (born 1946), English actress
- Geoffrey Keen (1916–2005), English actor
- Harold Keen (1894–1973), British engineer
- Helen Keen, English comedian
- Vic Keen, Major League Baseball Player
- Jessica Keen (1975–1991), American murder victim
- John "Speedy" Keen (1945–2002), English rock musician
- John Keen (cyclist) (1849–1902), British cyclist
- John Keen (politician) (1930–2016), Kenyan politician
- Laurence Keen, British Archaeologist
- Malcolm Keen (1887–1970), British actor
- Marie Keen (1895–1967), American politician
- Marshall F. Keen (born 1933), American politician
- Maurice Keen (1933–2012), British historian
- Noah Keen (1920–2019), American actor
- Peter Keen (born 1976), English footballer
- Peter Keen (cyclist) (born 1964), British cycling coach
- Richard Keen (born 1954), Scottish lawyer
- Richard Keen (racing driver) (born 1986), English racing driver
- Robert Earl Keen (born 1956), American guitarist
- Sam Keen (1931–2025), American author, professor and philosopher
- Simon Keen (born 1987), Australian cricketer
- Steve Keen (born 1953), Australian economist
- Tom Keen (politician) (born c. 1956), American politician
- Will Keen (born 1976), English actor

== Fictional characters ==
- Captain/Commander Keen, the main character in Commander Keen games
- Elizabeth Keen, a character in the TV series The Blacklist

== See also ==
- Keene (surname)
- Kene, another name
