= John Keene =

John Keene may refer to:

- John Keene (cricketer) (1873–1931), English cricketer
- John Keene (physicist) (1921–1991), English physicist
- John Keene (writer) (born 1965), American writer, translator and professor of English and African American Studies

== See also ==
- Keene (surname)
- John Kean (disambiguation)
- John Keane (disambiguation)
- John Keen (disambiguation)
