= Alex Brundle =

British racing driver (born 1990)

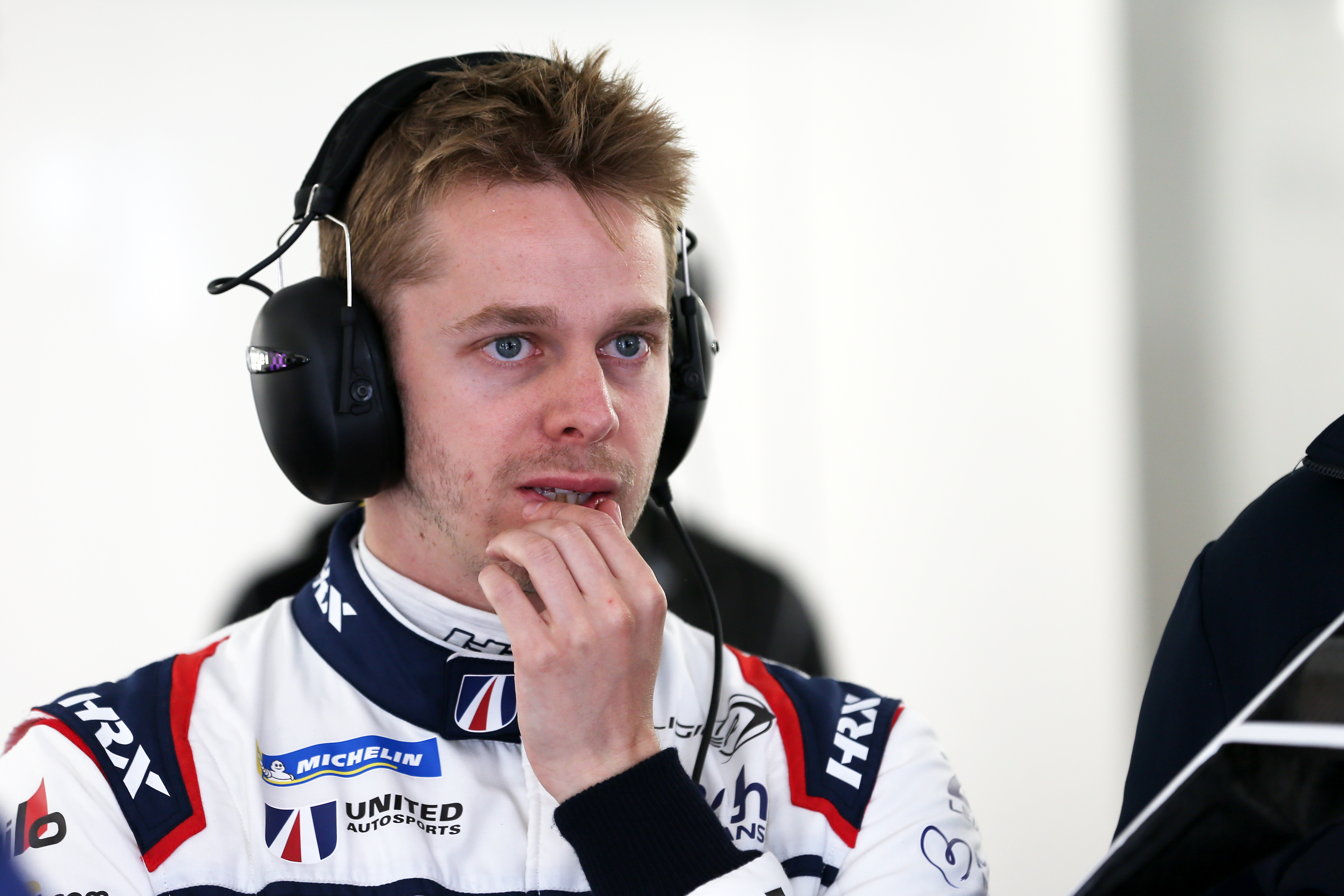
- Brundle in 2019
- Nationality: British
- Born: 7 August 1990 (age 36) King's Lynn, Norfolk, England
- Relatives: Martin Brundle (father); Robin Brundle (uncle)
- Categorisation: FIA Silver (2012); FIA Gold (2013–)

Previous series
- 2012 2009, 2011 2010 2007–08 2006–07 2006: GP3 Series; FIA Formula Two; British Formula 3 Formula Palmer Audi; FPA Autumn Trophy; T Cars

Alexander Brundle (born 7 August 1990) is a British racing driver and broadcaster. He was the 2016 European Le Mans Series champion (LMP3) and is the son of Formula One driver-turned-commentator Martin Brundle.

== Careers ==
=== Karting and T Cars ===
Brundle drove a kart for the first time at the age of eight. He began his car racing career in 2006 by competing in the T Cars championship, a saloon car-based series for drivers aged 14 to 17. He finished eighth in the championship.

=== Formula Palmer Audi ===
In the closing months of 2006, Brundle moved to open-wheel racing by taking part in the Formula Palmer Audi Autumn Trophy, in which he finished 21st overall. For 2007, he stayed in the category for the season's main championship, finishing eleventh, and also returned to the Autumn Trophy afterwards, improving to eighth.

In 2008, Brundle returned to FPA for a second season, taking a pole position and three podium finishes on his way to sixth position in the championship. His father Martin, inspired by his son's progress, also raced in the round of the championship held at Spa-Francorchamps.

=== FIA Formula Two Championship ===
Brundle signed to drive for the relaunched FIA Formula Two Championship in 2009. He drove car number 5 in the series, and joined Jolyon Palmer and Jack Clarke in graduating to it from the previous year's FPA championship. He finished nineteenth in the championship, amassing five points.

=== British Formula Three ===
Brundle competed in the 2010 British Formula 3 Championship, driving for the T-Sport team. He finished 17th after contesting all 30 rounds, scoring 11 points with a best finish of eighth.

=== Return to FIA Formula Two Championship ===
Brundle returned to Formula Two for the 2011 season. He struggled during his first race weekend of the season at Silverstone, but took pole position for the first race at Magny Cours, and secured a podium finish in both of the weekend's races. Brundle later got a third podium finish with a third place at race one at Monza. Brundle finished the season seventh in the standings making him the most successful British driver of the 2011 Formula Two season.

=== GP3 Series ===
On 3 February 2012, Brundle was signed to race in the eight-round 2012 GP3 Series by Carlin Motorsport. The season followed the European leg of the Formula One Championship and was considered a stepping stone into the GP2 Series.

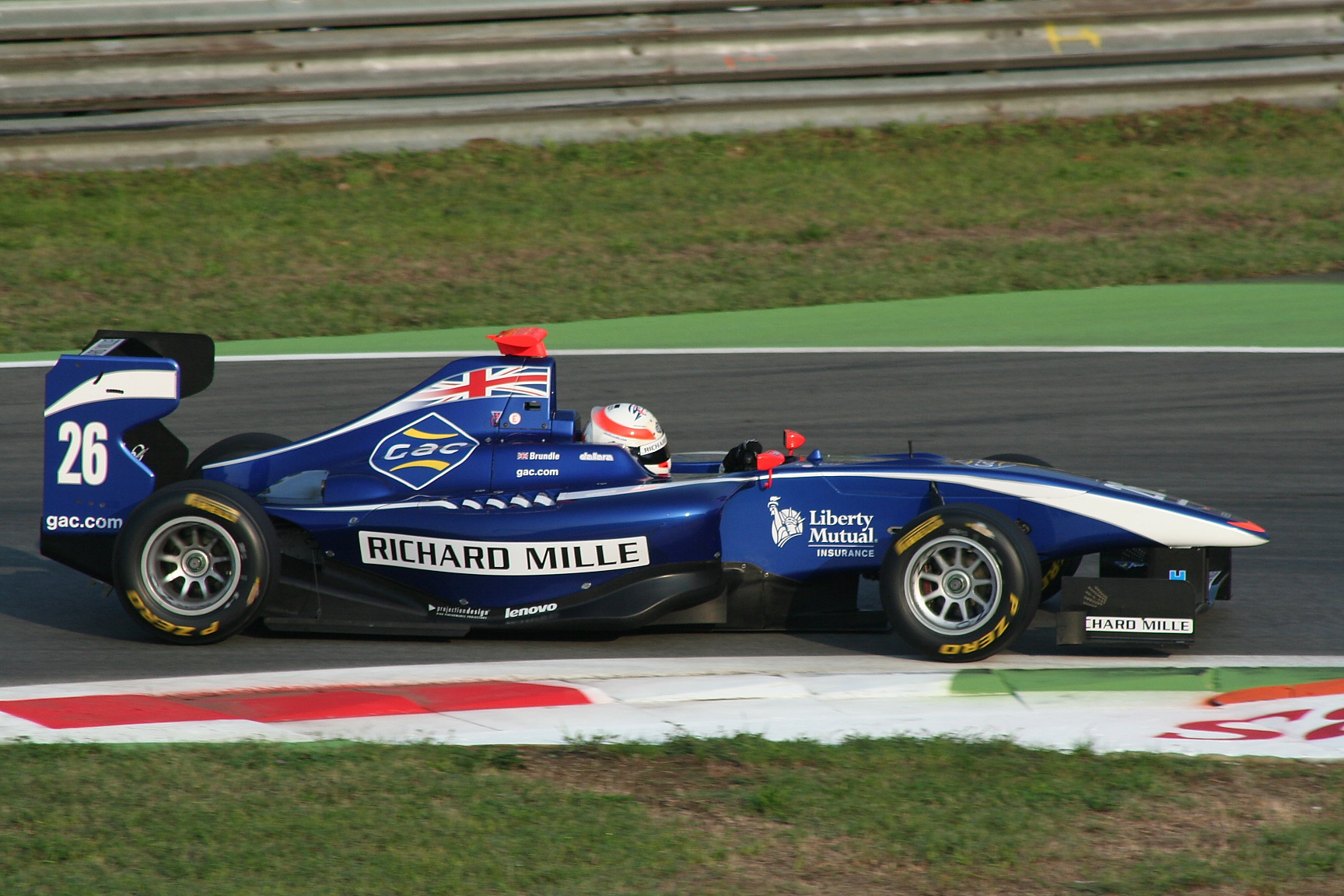
Brundle at the 2012 Monza GP3 Series round

On 13 May 2012, Brundle obtained points in his debut race with a tenth-place finish at the Feature Race of the Spanish Grand Prix. He then subsequently achieved 8th place in the sprint race the following day.

On 29 July 2012, Brundle took his first GP3 podium finish in race 2 of the Budapest event.

=== Formula E ===
Brundle signed on 12 February 2014 to become part of the Formula E Drivers Club in the new FIA championship for electric vehicles.

=== Sportscars ===
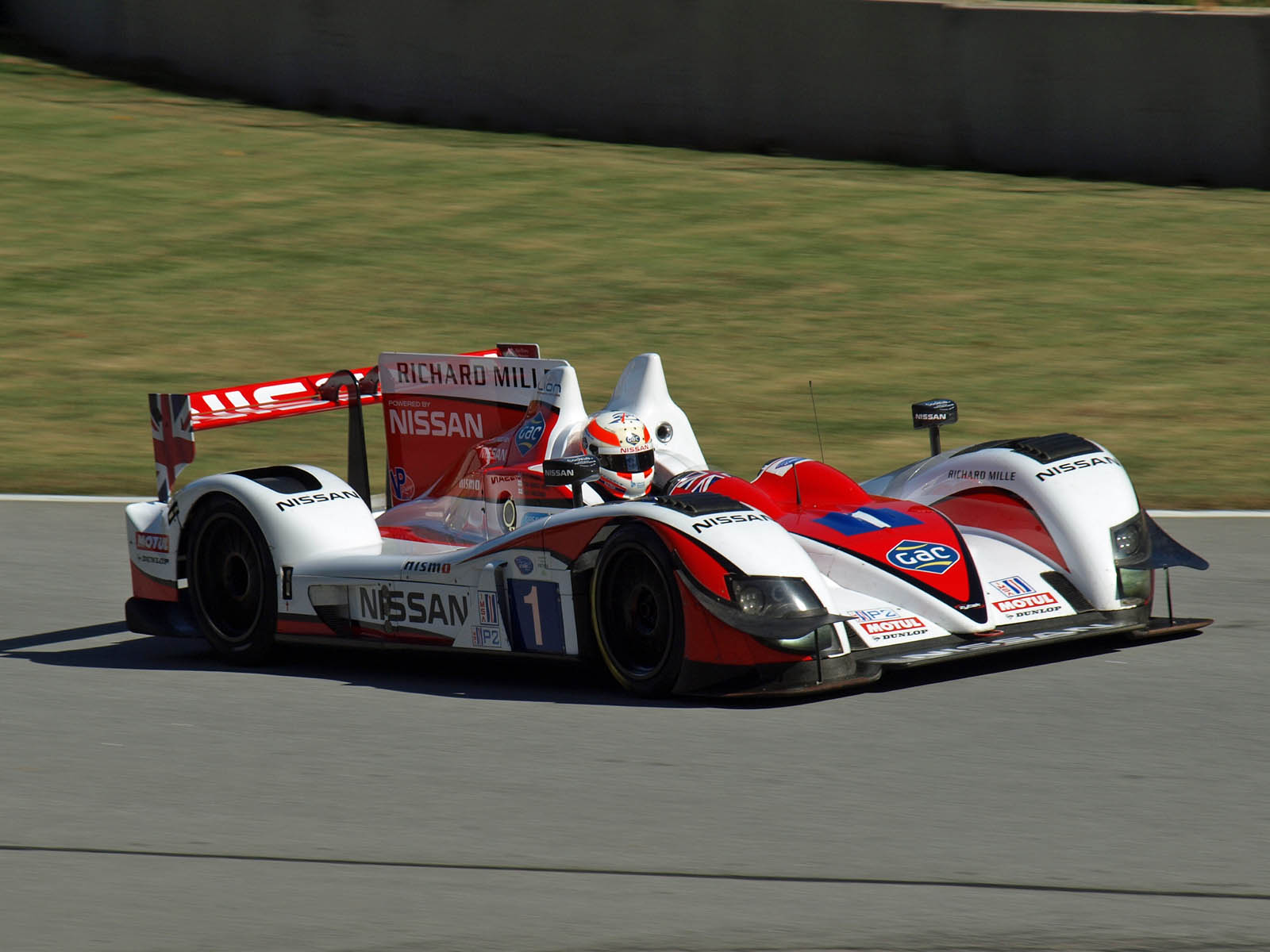
Brundle during qualifying for the 2012 Petit Le Mans

Brundle made his Le Mans debut in 2012, piloting a Greaves Motorsport-run Zytek-Nissan LMP2 alongside his father. He also contested the Le Mans Series for the team, who enter 2012 as reigning champions. Martin and Alex won the Woolf Barnato Trophy for becoming the highest finishing British drivers in a British car in the 2012 Le Mans 24 Hours

Brundle competed in the 2013 FIA World Endurance Championship season, finishing second in the championship for OAK Racing in LMP2 class and second in the 2013 24 Hours of Le Mans in the LMP2 class.

After finishing fifth at the 2014 Rolex 24 at Daytona while driving for Muscle Milk Pickett Racing, Brundle returned to OAK for the rest of the 2014 United SportsCar Championship season North American Endurance Cup events at Sebring International Raceway, Watkins Glen International, and Road Atlanta, respectively. Brundle won the Total Pole Award for the most pole positions scored in the 2014 United SportsCar Championship season

Brundle returned to the European Le Mans Series in 2016 winning the championship with United Autosports scoring a pole, three wins and two further podiums on his way to championship victory. Brundle also joined G-Drive racing for the last five rounds of the 2016 FIA World Endurance Championship season winning the last three races of the series and taking one further podium.

=== Historic racing ===
Brundle also often competes in historic racing events, mostly driving a Lola T70 Mk3B in Masters Sports Car Legends competition.

=== Broadcasting ===
During his racing career, Brundle has also served as a commentator for various motorsport series when not racing himself. He is best known for his commentary on select rounds of the FIA Formula 2 Championship and FIA Formula 3 Championship, working alongside lead commentator Alex Jacques.

== Racing record ==
=== Career summary ===
Season	Series	Team name	Races	Wins	Poles	F/Laps	Podiums	Points	Position
2006	T Cars	PalmerSport Junior	18	0	0	?	2	86	8th
2006	Formula Palmer Audi Autumn Trophy	THB Clowes	6	0	0	?	0	14	21st
2007	Formula Palmer Audi	THB Clowes	20	0	0	?	0	160	11th
2007	Formula Palmer Audi Autumn Trophy	THB Clowes	6	0	0	0	0	57	8th
2008	Formula Palmer Audi	Nasstar	20	0	1	0	3	240	6th
2009	FIA Formula Two Championship	MotorSport Vision	16	0	0	0	0	5	19th
2010	British Formula 3 Championship	T-Sport	30	0	0	0	0	11	17th
2011	FIA Formula Two Championship	MotorSport Vision	16	0	1	0	3	112	7th
2012	GP3 Series	Carlin	16	0	0	0	1	19	16th
2012	European Le Mans Series - LMP2	Greaves Motorsport	3	0	0	0	1	48	**3rd**
2012	24 Hours of Le Mans - LMP2	Greaves Motorsport	1	0	0	0	0	N/A	8th
2013	FIA World Endurance Championship - LMP2	OAK Racing	8	0	1	0	6	132.5	**2nd**
2013	24 Hours of Le Mans - LMP2	OAK Racing	1	0	1	0	1	N/A	**2nd**
2014	European Le Mans Series - GTC	ART Grand Prix	5	0	0	0	0	38	14th
2014	United SportsCar Championship - Prototype	Muscle Milk Pickett Racing	1	0	0	0	0	169	22nd
2014	United SportsCar Championship - Prototype	OAK Racing	5	0	2	0	2	169	22nd
2014	24 Hours of Le Mans - LMP2	OAK Racing	1	0	0	0	0	N/A	5th
2015	United SportsCar Championship	Krohn Racing	1	0	0	0	0	19	32nd
2015	FIA World Endurance Championship - LMP2	Pegasus Racing Team Total by DC Racing	1	0	0	0	0	0	NC†
2016	European Le Mans Series - LMP3	United Autosports	6	3	1	2	5	109.5	**1st**
2016	FIA World Endurance Championship - LMP2	G-Drive Racing	6	3	0	0	4	98	6th
2017	FIA World Endurance Championship - LMP2	Jackie Chan DC Racing	9	0	0	1	1	77	11th
2017	24 Hours of Le Mans - LMP2	Jackie Chan DC Racing	1	0	0	0	1	N/A	**2nd**
2018	Blancpain GT Series Endurance Cup	R-Motorsport	3	0	0	0	0	12	34th
2018	IMSA SportsCar Championship - Prototype	Jackie Chan DCR JOTA	1	0	0	0	0	52	36th
2018	IMSA SportsCar Championship - Prototype	United Autosports	1	0	0	0	0	52	36th
2018	24 Hours of Le Mans	CEFC TRSM Racing	1	0	0	0	0	N/A	DNF
2018-19	FIA World Endurance Championship	CEFC TRSM Racing	1	0	0	0	0	0	NC
2019	European Le Mans Series - LMP2	United Autosports	6	0	0	0	1	37.5	12th
2019	24 Hours of Le Mans - LMP2	United Autosports	1	0	0	0	0	N/A	14th
2019	24 Hours of Nürburgring - SP8T	AMR Performance Centre	1	1	0	0	1	N/A	**1st**
2020	European Le Mans Series - LMP2	United Autosports	5	1	0	0	2	70	**2nd**
2020	24 Hours of Le Mans - LMP2	United Autosports	1	0	0	0	0	N/A	13th
2021	FIA World Endurance Championship - LMP2	Inter Europol Competition	6	0	0	0	1	84	6th
2021	24 Hours of Le Mans - LMP2	Inter Europol Competition	1	0	0	0	0	N/A	5th
2022	FIA World Endurance Championship - LMP2	Inter Europol Competition	5	0	0	0	0	20	15th
2022	24 Hours of Le Mans - LMP2	Inter Europol Competition	1	0	0	0	0	N/A	13th
2023	24 Hours of Nürburgring - Cup2	Mühlner Motorsport	1	0	1	0	0	N/A	6th
2024	Nürburgring Langstrecken-Serie - Cup2	Mühlner Motorsport	4	0	0	0	3	66.5	11th
2024	24 Hours of Nürburgring - Cup2	Mühlner Motorsport	1	0	0	0	0	N/A	4th
2026	24 Hours of Nürburgring - SP9 Pro-Am	Mühlner Motorsport	1	0	0	0	1	N/A	**3rd**

^{†} As Brundle was a guest driver, he was ineligible to score points.
^{*} Season still in progress.

=== Complete FIA Formula Two Championship results ===
(key) (Races in bold indicate pole position) (Races in italics indicate fastest lap)

Year	1	2	3	4	5	6	7	8	9	10	11	12	13	14	15	16	Pos	Points
2009	VAL; 1; 8	VAL; 2; 23	BRN; 1; 11	BRN; 2 Ret	SPA; 1 Ret	SPA; 2; 5	BRH; 1 Ret	BRH; 2; 11	DON; 1; 14	DON; 2 Ret	OSC; 1 Ret	OSC; 2; 11	IMO; 1; 17	IMO; 2 Ret	CAT; 1; 15	CAT; 2; 12	19th	5
2011	SIL; 1; 19	SIL; 2 Ret	**MAG**; **1**; 3	MAG; 2; 2	SPA; 1; 5	SPA; 2; 7	NÜR; 1 Ret	NÜR; 2; 5	BRH; 1 Ret	BRH; 2; 17	RBR; 1; 4	RBR; 2 Ret	MON; 1; 3	MON; 2; 4	CAT; 1; 8	CAT; 2; 5	7th	112

=== Complete British Formula 3 International Series results ===
(key) (Races in bold indicate pole position; races in italics indicate fastest lap)

Year	Entrant	1	2	3	4	5	6	7	8	9	10	11	12	13	14	15	16	17	18	19	20	21	22	23	24	25	26	27	28	29	30	DC	Points
2010	T-Sport	OUL; 1; 15	OUL; 2; 10	OUL; 3; 9	SIL1; 1; 13	SIL1; 2; 11	SIL1; 3; 20	MAG; 1 Ret	MAG; 2; 12	MAG; 3 Ret	HOC; 1; 15	HOC; 2; 14	HOC; 3; 10	ROC; 1; 16	ROC; 2; 12	ROC; 3; 15	SPA; 1; 18	SPA; 2; 17	SPA; 3; 21	THR; 1 Ret	THR; 2; 11	THR; 3; 10	SIL2; 1; 16	SIL2; 2; 18	SIL2; 3; 8	SNE; 1; 13	SNE; 2; 11	SNE; 3; 19	BRH; 1; 13	BRH; 2; 10	BRH; 3 Ret	17th	11

=== Complete GP3 Series results ===
(key) (Races in bold indicate pole position) (Races in italics indicate fastest lap)

Year	Entrant	1	2	3	4	5	6	7	8	9	10	11	12	13	14	15	16	D.C.	Points
2012	Carlin	CAT; FEA; 10	CAT; SPR; 8	MON; FEA; 10	MON; SPR; Ret	VAL; FEA; 16	VAL; SPR; 14	SIL; FEA; 7	SIL; SPR; 10	HOC; FEA; DSQ	HOC; SPR; 13	HUN; FEA; 15	HUN; SPR; 3	SPA; FEA; 19	SPA; SPR; 11	MNZ; FEA; DSQ	MNZ; SPR; 10	16th	19

=== Complete 24 Hours of Le Mans results ===
Year	Team	Co-Drivers	Car	Class	Laps	Pos.	Class Pos.
2012	(United Kingdom) Greaves Motorsport	(Spain) Lucas Ordóñez (United Kingdom) Martin Brundle	Zytek Z11SN-Nissan	LMP2	340	15th	8th
2013	(France) OAK Racing	(France) Olivier Pla (Denmark) David Heinemeier Hansson	Morgan LMP2-Nissan	LMP2	328	8th	**2nd**
2014	(France) OAK Racing	(United Kingdom) Jann Mardenborough (Russia) Mark Shulzhitskiy	Ligier JS P2-Nissan	LMP2	354	9th	5th
2017	(China) Jackie Chan DC Racing	(United States) David Cheng (France) Tristan Gommendy	Oreca 07-Gibson	LMP2	363	**3rd**	**2nd**
2018	(China) CEFC TRSM Racing	(United Kingdom) Oliver Rowland (United Kingdom) Oliver Turvey	Ginetta G60-LT-P1-Mecachrome	LMP1	137	DNF	DNF
2019	(United States) United Autosports	(Republic of Ireland) Ryan Cullen (United States) Will Owen	Ligier JS P217-Gibson	LMP2	348	19th	14th
2020	(United States) United Autosports	(Netherlands) Job van Uitert (United States) Will Owen	Oreca 07-Gibson	LMP2	359	17th	13th
2021	(Poland) Inter Europol Competition	(Poland) Jakub Śmiechowski (Netherlands) Renger van der Zande	Oreca 07-Gibson	LMP2	360	10th	5th
2022	(Poland) Inter Europol Competition	(Mexico) Esteban Gutiérrez (Poland) Jakub Śmiechowski	Oreca 07-Gibson	LMP2	365	17th	13th

=== Complete European Le Mans Series results ===
Year	Team	Class	Car	Engine	1	2	3	4	5	6	Rank	Points
2012	Greaves Motorsport	LMP2	Zytek Z11SN	Nissan VK45DE 4.5 L V8	LEC; 4	DON; 7	PET; 3				3rd	48
2014	ART Grand Prix	GTC	McLaren MP4-12C GT3	McLaren 3.8L V8	SIL; 5	IMO; 4	RBR; 4	LEC; 8	EST; Ret		14th	38
2016	United Autosports	LMP3	Ligier JS P3	Nissan VK50VE 5.0 L V8	SIL; 1	IMO; 1	RBR; 1	LEC; 3	SPA; 2	**EST**; 11	1st	109.5
2019	United Autosports	LMP2	Ligier JS P217	Gibson GK428 4.2 L V8	LEC; 12	MNZ; 3	CAT; 8	SIL; 8	SPA; 9	ALG; 4	12th	37.5
2020	United Autosports	LMP2	Oreca 07	Gibson GK428 4.2 L V8	LEC; 1	SPA; 5	LEC; 8	MNZ; 2	ALG; 4		2nd	70

=== Complete FIA World Endurance Championship results ===
Year	Entrant	Class	Car	Engine	1	2	3	4	5	6	7	8	9	Rank	Points
2012	Greaves Motorsport	LMP2	Zytek Z11SN	Nissan VK45DE 4.5 L V8	SEB	SPA	LMS; 13	SIL; 12						73rd	1.5
2012	OAK Racing	LMP2	Morgan LMP2	Nissan VK45DE 4.5 L V8					SÃO; Ret	BHR; Ret	FUJ	SHA		73rd	1.5
2013	OAK Racing	LMP2	Morgan LMP2	Nissan VK45DE 4.5 L V8	SIL; 2	SPA; 2	**LMS**; 2	SÃO; 6	COA; 6	FUJ; 3	SHA; 2	BHR; 2		2nd	132.5
2015	Pegasus Racing Team Total by DC Racing	LMP2	Morgan LMP2	Nissan VK45DE 4.5 L V8	SIL	SPA	LMS	NÜR	COA	FUJ	SHA; 5	BHR		NC^{†}	0^{†}
2016	G-Drive Racing	LMP2	Oreca 05	Nissan VK45DE 4.5 L V8	SIL	SPA	LMS	NÜR; Ret	MEX; 7	COA; 3	FUJ; 1	SHA; 1	BHR; 1	6th	98
2017	Jackie Chan DC Racing	LMP2	Oreca 07	Gibson GK428 4.2 L V8	SIL; 8	SPA; 10	LMS; 2	NÜR; 5	MEX; 6	COA; 5	FUJ; Ret	SHA; 8	BHR; 8	11th	77
2018–19	CEFC TRSM Racing	LMP1	Ginetta G60-LT-P1	Mecachrome V634P1 3.4 L Turbo V6	SPA; WD	LMS; Ret	SIL	FUJ	SHA	SEB	SPA	LMS		NC	0
2021	Inter Europol Competition	LMP2	Oreca 07	Gibson GK428 4.2 L V8	SPA; 5	ALG; 5	MNZ; 4	LMS; 3	BHR; 9	BHR; 5				6th	84
2022	Inter Europol Competition	LMP2	Oreca 07	Gibson GK428 4.2 L V8	SEB	SPA; Ret	LMS; 8	MNZ; 4	FUJ; 11	BHR; NC				15th	20

^{†} As Brundle was a guest driver, he was ineligible to score points.
^{*} Season still in progress.

=== Complete IMSA SportsCar Championship results ===
(key)(Races in bold indicate pole position)

Year	Entrant	Class	Make	Engine	1	2	3	4	5	6	7	8	9	10	11	Rank	Points
2014	Muscle Milk Pickett Racing	P	Oreca 03	Nissan VK45DE 4.5 L V8	DAY; 5											15th	169
2014	OAK Racing	P	Morgan LMP2	Nissan VK45DE 4.5 L V8		SEB; 4	LBH	LGA; 8	DET	**WGL**; 2	MOS	IMS	ELK			15th	169
2014	OAK Racing	P	Ligier JS P2	Honda HR28TT 2.8 L V6 Turbo										**COA**; 2	PET; 9	15th	169
2015	Krohn Racing	P	Ligier JS P2	Judd HK 3.6 L V8	DAY; 13	SEB	LBH	LGA	DET	WGL	MOS	ELK	COA	PET		32nd	19
2018	Jackie Chan DCR JOTA	P	Oreca 07	Gibson GK428 4.2 L V8	DAY; 5											36th	52
2018	United Autosports	P	Ligier JS P217	Gibson GK428 4.2 L V8		SEB; 5	LBH	MDO	DET	WGL	MOS	ELK	LGA	PET		36th	52

Sporting positions
Preceded by Chris Hoy; Charlie Robertson	European Le Mans Series; LMP3 Champion; 2016; With: Mike Guasch & Christian England	Succeeded by Sean Rayhall; John Falb
