= John J. Keane =

John J. Keane may refer to:

- John J. Keane (politician), Irish politician
- John J. Keane (bishop) (1839–1918), American Roman Catholic archbishop of Dubuque
- Johnny Keane (John Joseph Keane, 1911–1967), Major League Baseball manager

== See also ==
- John Keane (disambiguation)
