= Paul Keene =

Paul Keene may refer to:

- Paul K. Keene (1910–2005), organic farmer
- Paul F. Keene Jr. (1920–2009), artist and teacher
