= James Keene =

James Keene may refer to:

- James R. Keene (1838–1913), American stockbroker and owner and breeder of Thoroughbred race horses
- James Keene (bishop) (1849–1919), Irish Anglican bishop
- James Keene (writer), pseudonym used 1955–64 by Ida Cook and William Everett Cook when writing Western novels
- James Keene (footballer) (born 1985), English footballer
- James F. Keene, American music scholar
- Jimmy Keene, American author and executive producer

== See also ==
- James Keane (disambiguation)
- Keene (surname)
