= John Keane =

John Keane may refer to:

== Sports ==
- John Keane (hurler) (1917–1975), Irish sportsman
- Jack Keane (hurler) (1892–1978), Irish hurler for the Limerick senior team
- John Keane (Gaelic footballer) (born 1980), Gaelic football player for Westmeath GAA
- Johnny Keane (1911–1967), American baseball player
- Jack Keane (footballer) (1911–2005), Australian rules footballer
- J. J. Keane (John James Keane, 1871–1956), Irish Gaelic footballer and Olympic official

== Politicians ==
- John J. Keane (politician), Irish Fianna Fáil politician from Galway
- John Thomas Keane (died 1946), Irish politician
- Sir John Keane, 5th Baronet (1873–1956), member of the first Irish government's Senate and a director of the Bank of Ireland
- Sir John Keane, 1st Baronet (1757–1829), MP for Youghal

== Musicians ==
- John E. Keane (born 1952), British film and television composer
- John M. Keane (musician) (born 1965), American songwriter and musician who used to be a member of a pop musical group the Keane Brothers
- John Keane (record producer), music producer and founder of the John Keane recording studio

== Military ==
- John Keane, 1st Baron Keane (1781–1844), Major General
- Jack Keane (John Keane, born 1943), former Vice Chief of Staff of the US Army

== Others ==
- John Fryer Thomas Keane (1854–1937), British adventurer
- John J. Keane (bishop) (1839–1918), Catholic archbishop of Dubuque, Iowa
- John Keane (artist) (born 1954), British artist
- John Keane (political theorist) (born 1949), Australian-born British political theorist
- John B. Keane (1928–2002), Irish playwright, novelist and essayist
- John B. Keane (architect) (died 1859), Irish architect
- John G. Keane, American business executive and director of the United States Census Bureau
- Jack Keane (video game), a 2007 video game by Deck13 Interactive

== See also ==
- John Kean (disambiguation)
- John Keen (disambiguation)
- John Keene (disambiguation)
- John Kene, MP for Newcastle-under-Lyme
