= 2008 Formula Palmer Audi season =

2008 Formula Palmer Audi

Seasons
- ← 2007 2009 →

The 2008 Henderson Formula Palmer Audi motor-racing competition was the eleventh of its kind. It was contested over 20 races at eight circuits in the United Kingdom and Belgium between April and September. The overall winner was Jason Moore.

== Championship ==
The 2008 Formula Palmer Audi Championship was very competitive, with seven winners through the season and a three-way championship battle going into the final round.

Jason Moore emerged as champion, but he was under intense pressure through much of the season from Tom Bradshaw and Jolyon Palmer. Moore made the best start to the season, winning three of the opening five races, with Richard Plant picking up a win in Round Two and Tom Bradshaw winning at Brands Hatch in Round Five. Moore also won in a triple-header at Spa-Francorchamps, although Jolyon Palmer scored an excellent victory in Round Six. Jack Clarke also scored a win in Round 10 at Oulton Park.

In the second half of the season Tom Bradshaw achieved four race wins, including a treble at Snetterton. Elsewhere Richard Keen made a superb albeit brief appearance in the championship, gaining two victories and one pole in three races.

In total there were 33 entrants. There were 20 rounds across eight race events, one of which took place out of the UK, at Spa-Francorchamps. The championship continued to support large international events at Brands Hatch such as A1 Grand Prix, the World Touring Car Championship and DTM.

== Championship standings ==
Pos.	Driver	Team	Points	Wins	Podiums	Poles
1	(United Kingdom) Jason Moore	Olney Tyres and Exhausts	360	6	14	6
2	(United Kingdom) Tom Bradshaw	Accident Exchange	351	7	12	5
3	(United Kingdom) Jolyon Palmer	Comma Oil	338	1	11	3
4	(United Kingdom) Richard Plant	GW Price	275	1	5	1
5	(United Kingdom) Jack Clarke	KSS Design Group	264	2	7	
6	(United Kingdom) Alex Brundle	Nasstar	240		3	1
7	(United Kingdom) Adam Foster (R)	NewNet	219			
8	(United Kingdom) Daniel Brown (R)	Momo UK	187			
9	(United Kingdom) Paul Rees (R)	emedia	177			
10	(Russia) Ivan Lukashevich(R)	Audi Russia	155		2	
11	(Russia) Max Snegirev	Audi Russia	137			
12	(Ukraine) Max Dmytrenko (R)	Sofiyskiy Fitness	134			
13	(United Kingdom) William Zollo (R)	Hermanos Toledano	131			
14	(United Kingdom) Emma Selway (R)	Relentless	130			
15	(France) Luc Paillard	Cult Energy Activator	118			
16	(United Kingdom) Matt Hamilton	Sywell Leisure Sports	110	1	2	1
17	(United Kingdom) Dan Rozwadowski (R)	Buy A Watt	106			
18	(United Kingdom) Russell Bolesworth	The Mirage	94			
19	(United Kingdom) Richard Keen		66	2	3	1
20	(Denmark) Vibe Smed (R)	Copenhagen Sensor Tech	62			
21	(United Kingdom) Robert Brown (R)	Momo UK	54			
22	(United Kingdom) Jodie Hemming (R)		45			
23=	(United Kingdom) Charles Hollings		34		1	
23=	(France) Damien Charveriat		34			
25	(United Kingdom) Kenny Andrews		28			
26	(United Kingdom) Nigel Reuben	Sywell Leisure	9			
27	(United Kingdom) Joe Paterson		8			
28=	(Italy) Luca Orlandi		6			
28=	(Morocco) Rachid Bouzouba		6			
28=	(France) Gilles Vannelet		6			
28=	(Italy) Giuseppe Cipriani		6			
32	(Italy) Ludovico Manfredi		3			
33	(United Kingdom) Mark Powell	Fujitsu	2			

== Race calendar ==
Round	Date	Circuit	Laps	Pole position	Fastest lap	Winner
1	13 April	(United Kingdom) Donington Park GP	14	(United Kingdom) Paul Rees	(United Kingdom) Jason Moore	(United Kingdom) Jason Moore
2	13 April	(United Kingdom) Donington Park GP	14	(United Kingdom) Tom Bradshaw	(United Kingdom) Jason Moore	(United Kingdom) Richard Plant
3	13 April	(United Kingdom) Donington Park GP	13		(United Kingdom) Jason Moore	(United Kingdom) Jason Moore
4	4 May	(United Kingdom) Brands Hatch (Grand Prix)	16	(United Kingdom) Jason Moore	(United Kingdom) Tom Bradshaw	(United Kingdom) Jason Moore
5	4 May	(United Kingdom) Brands Hatch (Grand Prix)	16	(United Kingdom) Alex Brundle	(United Kingdom) Tom Bradshaw	(United Kingdom) Tom Bradshaw
6	18 May	(Belgium) Spa-Francorchamps	9	(United Kingdom) Tom Bradshaw	(Russia) Ivan Lukashevich	(United Kingdom) Jolyon Palmer
7	18 May	(Belgium) Spa-Francorchamps	9	(United Kingdom) Jason Moore	(United Kingdom) Jolyon Palmer	(United Kingdom) Jason Moore
8	18 May	(Belgium) Spa-Francorchamps	9		(Russia) Ivan Lukashevich	(United Kingdom) Jason Moore
9	28 June	(United Kingdom) Oulton Park (International)	11	(United Kingdom) Tom Bradshaw	(United Kingdom) Jolyon Palmer	(United Kingdom) Tom Bradshaw
10	28 June	(United Kingdom) Oulton Park (International)	14	(United Kingdom) Tom Bradshaw	(United Kingdom) Jack Clarke	(United Kingdom) Jack Clarke
11	27 July	(United Kingdom) Brands Hatch (International)	16	(United Kingdom) Jolyon Palmer	(United Kingdom) Jason Moore	(United Kingdom) Jason Moore
12	27 July	(United Kingdom) Brands Hatch (International)	16	(United Kingdom) Jolyon Palmer	(United Kingdom) Jack Clarke	(United Kingdom) Jack Clarke
13	17 August	(United Kingdom) Snetterton	18	(United Kingdom) Tom Bradshaw	(United Kingdom) Tom Bradshaw	(United Kingdom) Tom Bradshaw
14	17 August	(United Kingdom) Snetterton	18	(United Kingdom) Jason Moore	(United Kingdom) Jack Clarke	(United Kingdom) Tom Bradshaw
15	17 August	(United Kingdom) Snetterton	18		(United Kingdom) Tom Bradshaw	(United Kingdom) Tom Bradshaw
16	31 August	(United Kingdom) Brands Hatch (Indy)	30	(United Kingdom) Jolyon Palmer	(United Kingdom) Jolyon Palmer	(United Kingdom) Tom Bradshaw
17	31 August	(United Kingdom) Brands Hatch (Indy)	30	(United Kingdom) Richard Keen	(United Kingdom) Jason Moore	(United Kingdom) Richard Keen
18	31 August	(United Kingdom) Brands Hatch (Indy)	30	(United Kingdom) Jason Moore	(United Kingdom) Richard Keen	(United Kingdom) Richard Keen
19	19 September	(United Kingdom) Silverstone	17	(United Kingdom) Matt Hamilton	(United Kingdom) Matt Hamilton	(United Kingdom) Matt Hamilton
20	19 September	(United Kingdom) Silverstone	17	(United Kingdom) Matt Hamilton	(United Kingdom) Matt Hamilton	(United Kingdom) Tom Bradshaw
