= John Keen =

John Keen may refer to:

- Speedy Keen (1945–2002), British musician
- John Keen (cyclist) (1849–1902), British professional cyclist and manufacturer of bicycles
- John Keen (Kenya politician), member of Kenya African National Union
- John Keen (Canadian politician), speaker of the Legislative Assembly of British Columbia (1918–1920)
- John Henry Keen (1851–1950), Anglican missionary in Canada

== See also ==
- John Keene (disambiguation)
- John Kean (disambiguation)
- John Keane (disambiguation)
