= Charles Keane =

Charles Keane may refer to:

- Charles Keane of the Keane Baronets
- Charles Keane, High Sheriff of Sligo
- Charles Keane, actor in Seven Guns to Mesa (1958)

== See also ==
- Charles Kean (1811–1868), English actor
- Charles Kean (trade unionist), British trade union leader
- Charles Barton Keen (1868–1931), American architect
- Charles Keene (disambiguation)
