= John Kean =

John Kean may refer to:

- John Kean (South Carolina politician) (1756–1795), South Carolina delegate to Continental Congress
- John Kean (New Jersey politician) (1852–1914), U.S. Senator from New Jersey
- John Kean (colonel) (1814–1895), New Jersey landowner and soldier
- John Kean (Canadian politician) (1820–1892), politician from Ontario, Canada
- John T. Kean (1857–?), Lieutenant Governor of South Dakota

== See also ==
- John Keane (disambiguation)
- John Keen (disambiguation)
- John Keene (disambiguation)
