= Great and British Motorsport Festival =

The Great and British Motorsport Festival is a package of motor races organised by the BARC and promoted by Dunlop. The events are a new addition to the motorsport calendar and appears at the Snetterton, Brands Hatch, Pembrey, Silverstone, Thruxton, Croft and Donington Park racing circuits. Despite the title of the events, a race meeting is held at the Spa Francorchamps circuit in Belgium.

== Format ==
The race meetings are held over two days, with the Saturday being devoted to free practice sessions and qualifying, with the occasional race to close the day. Sunday is devoted to racing as well as other strategies to increase spectator attendance, such as coach rides around the circuit.

== Championships ==
A number of championships will feature on every Great and British event. These are the Radical UK Championship which is for Radical SR8 and SR3 cars' which features two 50 minute races with a driver change part way through each race. The Radical Club Championship, which features two 20 minute races for Radical SR4 and Prosport machinery. The other permanent championships are the MINI Challenge and the new Dunlop Sport Maxx initiative, for road legal cars only, providing a stepping stone into the BTCC.

== Guest Races ==
Each event will also feature a number of championships that will only appear at selected events. These include the Westfield Sports Car Challenge, Classic Clubmans, Mini Miglia/Mini Seven Championships and races from the Classic Touring Car Club. The Belgian event also features races for the Belcar and Dutch Supercar Sports Car Championship. In 2007, a new saloon car package will join the bill which is intended to be a nurturing ground for aspiring Touring Car drivers.
