= Radiolysis =

Dissociation of molecules by ionizing radiation

Radiolysis is the dissociation of molecules caused by ionizing radiation. The high-energy flux results in cleavage of one or more chemical bonds. Radiolysis is distinguished from other dissociations by the type of radiation involved: it is not photodissociation using lower-energy ranges of the electromagnetic spectrum or other high-energy processes such as an electric discharge. The chemistry of concentrated solutions under ionizing radiation is extremely complex. Radiolysis can locally modify redox conditions, and therefore the speciation and the solubility of the compounds.

== Water decomposition ==
Of all the radiation-based chemical reactions that have been studied, the most important is the decomposition of water. When exposed to radiation, water undergoes a breakdown sequence into hydrogen peroxide, hydrogen radicals, and assorted oxygen compounds, such as ozone, which when converted back into oxygen releases great amounts of energy. Some of these are explosive. This decomposition is produced mainly by alpha particles, which can be entirely absorbed by very thin layers of water.

Summarizing, the radiolysis of water can be written as:

$$\ce{H2O \; ->[\text{Ionizing radiation}] \; e^{-}_{aq}, HO*, H*, HO2*, H3O^+, OH^-, H2O2, H2}$$

== Applications ==
=== Corrosion prediction and prevention in nuclear power plants ===
It is believed that the enhanced concentration of hydroxyl present in irradiated water in the inner coolant loops of a light-water reactor must be taken into account when designing nuclear power plants, to prevent coolant loss resulting from corrosion.

=== Hydrogen production ===
The current interest in nontraditional methods for the generation of hydrogen has prompted a revisit of radiolytic splitting of water, where the interaction of various types of ionizing radiation (α, β, and γ) with water produces molecular hydrogen. This reevaluation was further prompted by the current availability of large amounts of radiation sources contained in the fuel discharged from nuclear reactors. This spent fuel is usually stored in water pools, awaiting permanent disposal or reprocessing. The yield of hydrogen resulting from the irradiation of water with β and γ radiation is low (G-values = <1 molecule per 100 electronvolts of absorbed energy) but this is largely due to the rapid reassociation of the species arising during the initial radiolysis. If impurities are present or if physical conditions are created that prevent the establishment of a chemical equilibrium, the net production of hydrogen can be greatly enhanced.

Another approach uses radioactive waste as an energy source for regeneration of spent fuel by converting sodium borate into sodium borohydride, preventing it from reacting with other products. By applying the proper combination of controls, stable borohydride compounds may be produced and used as hydrogen fuel storage medium.

A study conducted in 1976 found an order-of-magnitude estimate can be made of the average hydrogen production rate that could be obtained by utilizing the energy liberated via radioactive decay. Based on the primary molecular hydrogen yield of 0.45 molecules/100 eV, it would be possible to obtain 10 tons per day. Hydrogen production rates in this range are not insignificant, but are small compared with the average daily usage (1972) of hydrogen in the U.S. of about 2 × 10^{4} tons. Addition of a hydrogen-atom donor could increase this about a factor of six. It was shown that the addition of a hydrogen-atom donor such as formic acid enhances the G value for hydrogen to about 2.4 molecules per 100 eV absorbed. The same study concluded that designing such a facility would likely be too unsafe to be feasible. More recent studies have suggested that the world's spent nuclear fuel stockpile of around 390 000 tons could be used to produce around 60% of the world's hydrogen demand (42.9 Mt) as of 2024 using photocatalytically-assisted radiolysis of water.

=== Spent nuclear fuel ===
Gas generation by radiolytic decomposition of hydrogen-containing materials has been an area of concern for the transport and storage of radioactive materials and waste for a number of years. Potentially combustible and corrosive gases can be generated while at the same time, chemical reactions can react with elemental hydrogen, and these reactions can be enhanced by the presence of radiation. The balance between these competing reactions is not well known at this time.

=== Radiation therapy ===
When radiation enters the body, it will interact with the atoms and molecules of the cells (mainly made of water) to produce free radicals and molecules that are able to diffuse far enough to reach the critical target in the cell, the DNA, and damage it indirectly through some chemical reaction. This is the main damage mechanism for photons as they are used for example in external beam radiation therapy.

Typically, the radiolytic events that lead to the damage of the (tumor) cell's DNA are subdivided into different stages that take place on different time scales:

- The physical stage ($10^{-15}~s$), consists in the energy deposition by the ionizing particle and the consequent ionization of water.
- During the physico-chemical stage ($10^{-15}~\text{-}~ 10^{-12}~s$) numerous processes occur, e.g. the ionized water molecules may split into a hydroxyl radical and a hydrogen molecule or free electrons may undergo solvation.
- During the chemical stage ($10^{-12} ~\text{-}~ 10^{-6}~s$), the first products of radiolysis react with each other and with their surrounding, thus producing several reactive oxygen species which are able to diffuse.
- During the bio-chemical stage ($10^{-6}~s$ to days) these reactive oxygen species might break the chemical bonds of the DNA, thus triggering the response of enzymes, the immune-system, etc.
- Finally, during the biological stage (days up to years) the chemical damage may translate into biological cell death or tumor formation when the damaged cells attempt to divide.

=== Earth's history ===
A suggestion has been made that in the early stages of the Earth's development when total planetary radioactivity was almost two orders of magnitude higher than at present, radiolysis could have been the principal source of atmospheric oxygen, which ensured the conditions for the origin and development of life. Molecular hydrogen and oxidants produced by the radiolysis of water may also provide a continuous source of energy to subsurface microbial communities (Pedersen, 1999). Such speculation is supported by a discovery in the Mponeng Gold Mine in South Africa, where the researchers found a community dominated by a new phylotype of Desulfotomaculum, feeding on primarily radiolytically produced H_{2}.

== Methods ==
=== Pulse radiolysis ===
Pulse radiolysis is a recent method of initiating fast reactions to study reactions occurring on a timescale faster than approximately one hundred microseconds, when simple mixing of reagents is too slow and other methods of initiating reactions have to be used.

The technique involves exposing a sample of material to a beam of highly accelerated electrons, where the beam is generated by a linac. It has many applications. It was developed in the late 1950s and early 1960s by John Keene in Manchester and Jack W. Boag in London.

=== Flash photolysis ===
Flash photolysis is an alternative to pulse radiolysis that uses high-power light pulses (e.g. from an excimer laser) rather than beams of electrons to initiate chemical reactions. Typically ultraviolet light is used which requires less radiation shielding than required for the X-rays emitted in pulse radiolysis.

== See also ==
- Radiation chemistry
