= Richard Keen (racing driver) =

British auto racing driver (born 1986)

- Nationality: (United Kingdom) British
- Born: 3 September 1986 (age 40) Amersham, England

Previous series
- 2008 2007 2005-2007 2005-2006 2006 2005 2004 2004 2003 2003 2001-2002 2001: Formula Palmer Audi; Formula Palmer Audi Autumn Trophy; Formula Renault 2.0 UK; Formula Renault 2.0 UK Winter Series; World Series by Renault; Formula BMW UK; British Formula Ford; BRDC Formula Ford; Zip Formula Great Britain; ABkC Formula TKM; Super 1 National JICA Championship; Andrea Margutti Trophy

Championship titles
- 2007 2005: Formula Palmer Audi Autumn Trophy; Formula Renault 2.0 UK Graduate Cup

Richard Keen (born 3 September 1986) is a British former auto racing driver. He was most notable for entering the World Series by Renault in 2006, and for winning the Formula Palmer Audi Autumn Trophy in 2007.

== Career ==
=== Karting ===
Keen, born in Amersham, England, started his karting career in 1999. In 2001, he entered both the Super 1 National JICA Championship and the Andrea Margutti Trophy ICA Junior, finishing eleventh and 23rd respectively. For 2002, he once more competed in the Super 1 National JICA Championship, finishing tenth overall. In 2003, he entered the ABkC Formula TKM karting series that year, finishing third overall.

=== Car racing ===
Keen began his car racing career in 2003 in the Zip Formula Great Britain series, before completing a full season in the BRDC 1600 Formula Ford the following year; he finished as runner-up in the latter series, with four wins. In 2004, he also entered two events of the British Formula Ford. In 2005, Keen moved into the Formula BMW UK series driving for Team SWR Pioneer, and finished on the podium once from four races. He then switched to the Formula Renault 2.0 UK series, driving for Team Firstair, and finished fourteenth in the championship standings, with 130 points from sixteen races, and won the Graduate Cup. In addition to the Formula BMW UK and Formula Renault UK series, he also entered the Formula Renault 2.0 UK Winter Series, taking a podium and finishing seventh overall. For 2006, he remained in the Formula Renault 2.0 UK, once more driving for Team Firstair, who had been renamed to Position 1 Racing, and finished fourteenth once more, this time with 160 points from twelve races. In September, Keen switched from the Formula Renault UK to the World Series by Renault, being entered by EuroInternational in the Donington Park round of the series. Although he was also entered by the team in the season finale at Barcelona, he stepped down from the event, and was replaced by Nil Monserrat. He also entered the Formula Renault 2.0 UK Winter Series in 2006 for Fortec Motorsport, taking a podium and finishing sixth overall. In 2007, Keen entered six rounds of the Formula Renault 2.0 UK for Apotex Scorpio Motorsport, alternating with David Epton during the first half of the season. He also entered the Formula Palmer Audi Autumn Trophy, taking the series' title with two victories and two podiums. In 2008, he entered the seventh round of the main Formula Palmer Audi series, taking a podium in race one, and winning the other two races of the event. He did not race in 2009, although he did test for the Caparo Pro 1000 series.

== Results ==
=== Complete Formula Renault 3.5 Series results ===
(key) (Races in bold indicate pole position) (Races in italics indicate fastest lap)

Year	Entrant	1	2	3	4	5	6	7	8	9	10	11	12	13	14	15	16	17	DC	Points
2006	EuroInternational	ZOL; 1	ZOL; 2	MON; 1	IST; 1	IST; 2	MIS; 1	MIS; 2	SPA; 1	SPA; 2	NÜR; 1	NÜR; 2	DON; 1; 20	DON; 2; 21	LMS; 1	LMS; 2	CAT; 1	CAT; 2	45th	0
