= James Keane =

James or Jim Keane may refer to:

- James Keane (actor) (born 1952), American film and television actor
- James Keane (bishop) (1857–1929), U.S. Catholic prelate
- James Keane (musician) (born 1948), Irish accordionist
- Jim Keane (American football) (1924–2011), American football player
- Jim Keane (politician) (born 1941/1942), Democratic Party member of the Montana Senate
- James Keane (director) of Richard III (1912 film)
- James F. Keane (1934–2020), American politician

== See also ==
- James Keene (disambiguation)
