= Kene =

Kene is a given name and surname of various origins. Notable people with this name include:

- Kene Eze (born 1992), American soccer player
- Kene Holliday (born 1949), American actor
- Kéné Ndoye (born 1978), Senegalese athlete
- Kene Nwangwu (born 1998), American football player
- Arinze Kene, British actor and playwright
- John Kene (fl. 1402), British politician

== See also ==
- Kene (Naga wrestling)
- Kené
- Keene (surname)
- Keen (surname)
