= Jack Clarke (racing driver) =

British racing driver (born 1988)

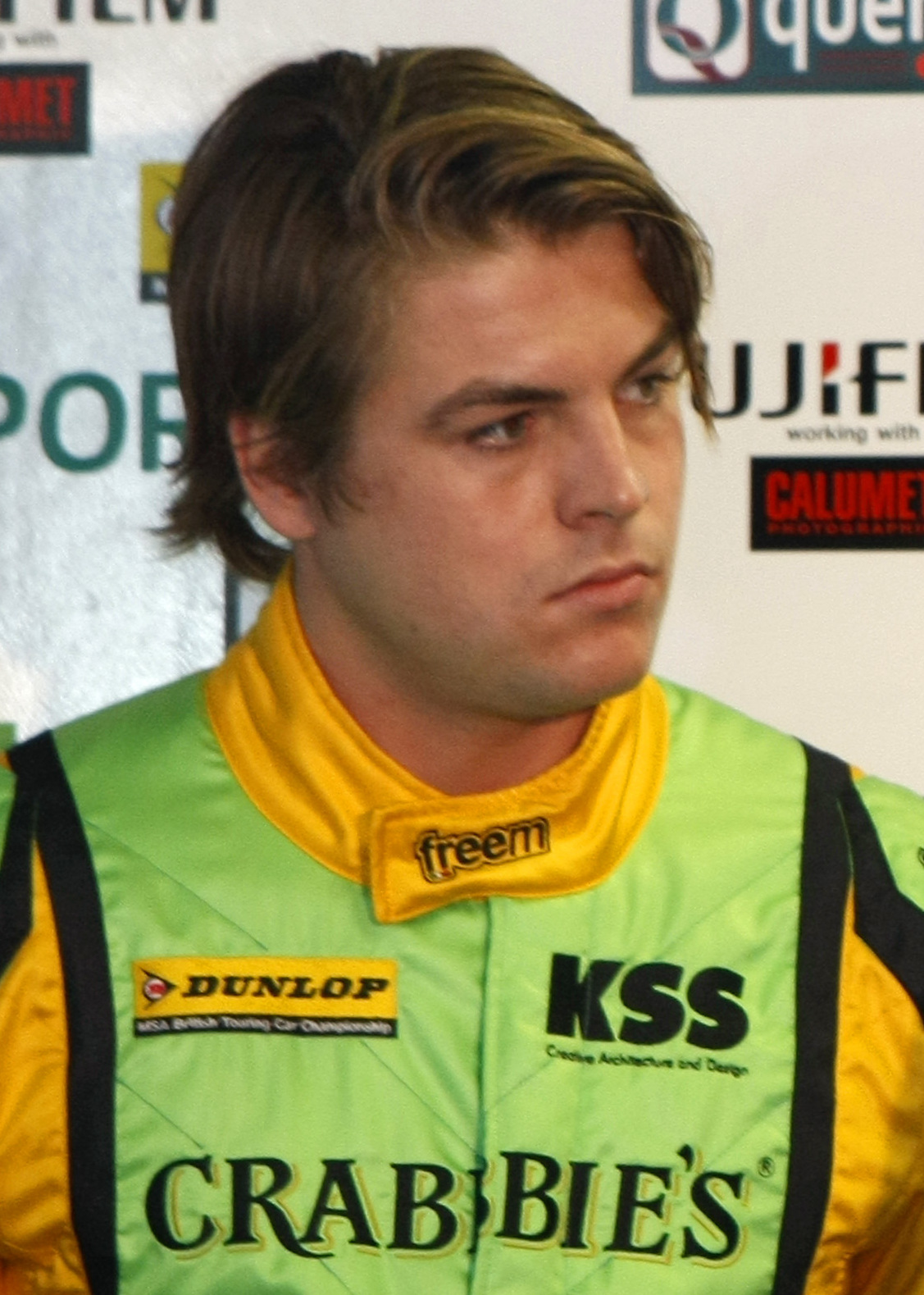
- Clarke in 2014
- Nationality: (United Kingdom) British
- Born: Jack Anthony Clarke; 1 March 1988 (age 38) Effingham, England
- Relatives: Julian Bailey (stepfather)

British Touring Car Championship career
- Debut season: 2014
- Current team: Crabbie's Racing
- Categorisation: FIA Gold
- Car number: 44
- Starts: 30
- Wins: 0
- Poles: 0
- Fastest laps: 0
- Best finish: 19th in 2014

Previous series
- 2013 2012 2012 2012 2012 2012 2009–11 2008 2007–08 2007–08 2006: International GT Open; Blancpain Endurance Series; NASCAR K&N Pro Series East; NASCAR K&N Pro Series West; ARCA Racing Series; European Le Mans Series; FIA Formula Two Championship; Porsche Carrera Cup UK; FPA Autumn Trophy; Formula Palmer Audi; Formula BMW UK

Jack Anthony Clarke (born 1 March 1988) is a British racing driver. Clarke is the stepson of ex-Formula One and British Touring Car Championship driver Julian Bailey.

== Career ==
=== Formula BMW ===
Clarke made his circuit racing debut in 2006 in the one-make Formula BMW UK series, driving for Nexa Racing. It was a tough rookie season, as he only scored two points all season en route to 22nd place in the championship, and sixth place in the Rookie Cup. He also finished 25th in the end of season World Final in Valencia. During the season, he achieved his A levels at the City of London Freemen's School in Ashtead, Surrey.

=== Formula Palmer Audi ===
Clarke moved up to the Formula Palmer Audi series for the 2007 season. Clarke suffered a poor start to the championship, amassing 76 points from the first seven races. Seven podiums in the last thirteen races, including two wins at Brands Hatch and Croft, progressed Clarke up the championship table to fourth, holding off Jason Moore by two points. Clarke also committed to an Autumn Trophy campaign, and he ended up third in the championship, sixteen points behind champion Richard Keen.

Clarke continued in the series in 2008, and this time finished fifth in the championship. Clarke won races at Oulton Park and Brands Hatch (both races with fastest laps) and also set a fastest lap during one of the races at Snetterton. A second Autumn Trophy campaign followed, and Clarke finished fourth, with a win, two poles and a fastest lap, all coming at Brands Hatch.

=== Formula Two ===
2009 saw Clarke move up to the FIA Formula Two Championship, driving car number eleven.

Clarke was involved in a racing accident during the second race of the Brands Hatch weekend. On lap nine, Clarke lost control of his car on the exit of Westfield bend, spinning into the tyre wall. Upon impact, one of the wheels detached from the car and bounced back towards the circuit. Pietro Gandolfi and Jolyon Palmer both avoided the tyre, but the tyre impacted with the head of Henry Surtees. His car, with its now unconscious driver, continued straight ahead into the barrier on the approach to Sheene Curve, also losing a wheel, and came to rest at the end of the curve with its remaining rear wheel still spinning. Surtees later succumbed to injuries inflicted by the tyre. Clarke paid tribute to Surtees, describing him as a "quality driver" and a "hard racer".

Clarke scored six points over the course of the season, finishing eighteenth in the championship.

In 2010, Clarke continued in Formula Two. He scored 81 points over the season, achieving two podiums and finishing ninth. He remained in the championship for 2011.

=== NASCAR/ARCA ===
In 2012, Clarke competed in one NASCAR K&N Pro Series East event at Rockingham Speedway driving the No. 14 Toyota for the Brazilian-owned: X Team Racing. He started 14th and finished 19th.

Also in 2012, Clarke competed in one NASCAR K&N Pro Series West race at NAPA Speedway driving No. 74 Dodge for Andy Woolgar. He started 17th and finished 20th. He also attempted the following event in West Series at All American Speedway but he failed to qualify for the race.

Clarke also competed in one ARCA Racing Series' race in 2012 season driving No. 97 Dodge for Creation-Cope Racing at Salem Speedway. He started 22nd and finished 30th due to a crash.

=== British Touring Car Championship ===
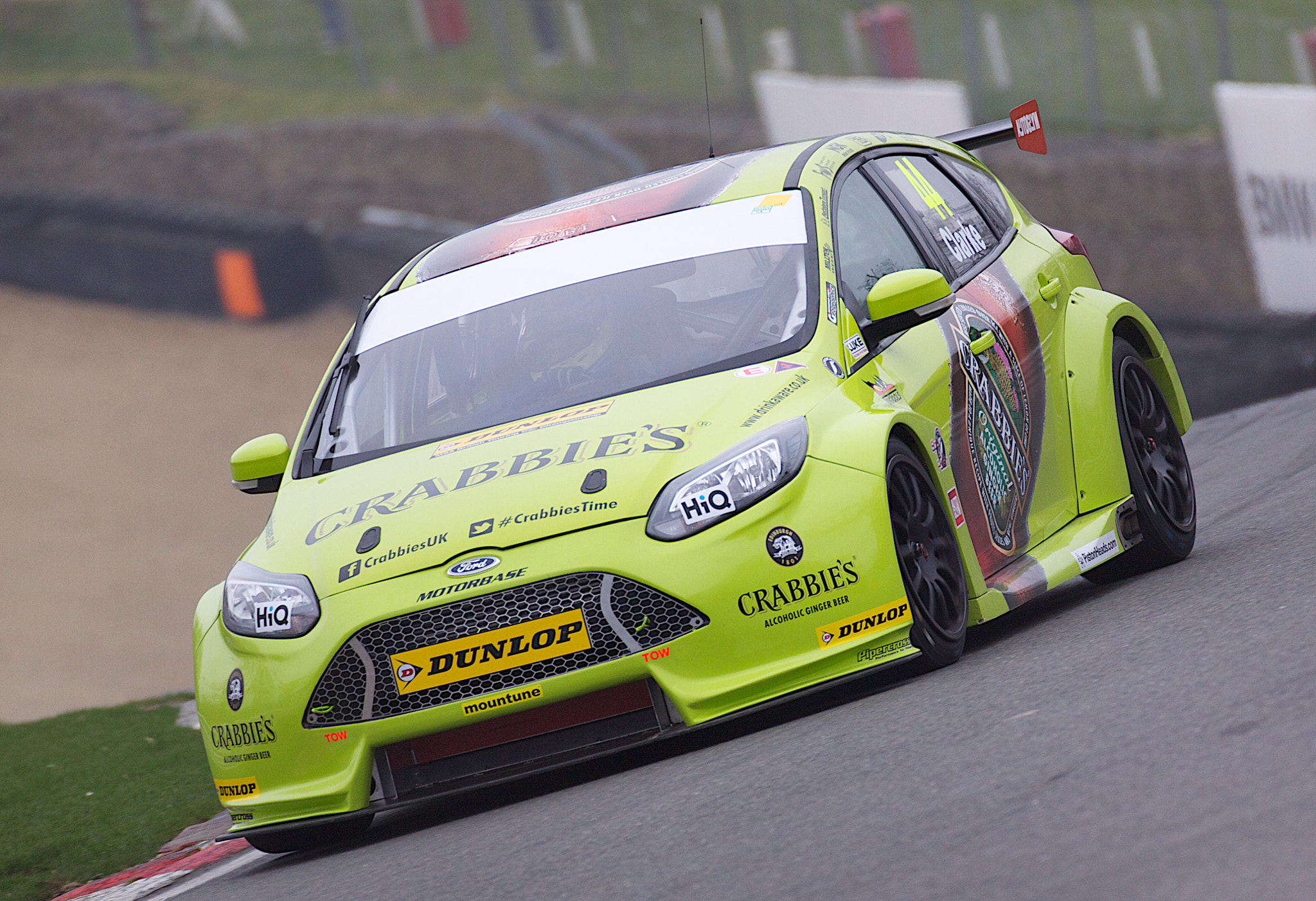
Clarke driving the Crabbie's Racing Ford Focus ST at Brands Hatch during the 2014 British Touring Car Championship season.

In 2014, Clarke entered the BTCC with Crabbie's Racing in a Ford Focus. His best result was second at the Brands Hatch final.

Clarke retired from racing at the end of that season and set up driver management company Veloce Sport with another former racing driver Rupert Svendsen-Cook, and his step-sister Mariella Bailey.

== Racing record ==
=== Career summary ===
Season	Series	Team	Races	Wins	Poles	F/Laps	Podiums	Points	Position
2006	Formula BMW UK	Nexa Racing	20	0	0	0	0	2	22nd
2007	Formula Palmer Audi	MotorSport Vision	20	2	2	?	6	253	4th
2007	Formula Palmer Audi Autumn Trophy	MotorSport Vision	6	1	1	0	4	96	**3rd**
2007	Formula Palmer Audi Shootout	MotorSport Vision	3	1	1	0	2	42	**2nd**
2008	Formula Palmer Audi	MotorSport Vision	19	2	0	3	7	264	5th
2008	Formula Palmer Audi Autumn Trophy	MotorSport Vision	6	1	2	1	2	86	4th
2008	Formula Palmer Audi Shootout	MotorSport Vision	3	0	0	0	0	30	4th
2008	Porsche Carrera Cup Great Britain	Porsche Motorsport	2	0	0	0	0	0	NC†
2009	FIA Formula Two Championship	MotorSport Vision	16	0	0	0	0	6	18th
2010	FIA Formula Two Championship	MotorSport Vision	17	0	0	0	3	81	9th
2011	FIA Formula Two Championship	MotorSport Vision	16	1	0	1	3	110	8th
2012	European Le Mans Series	Boutsen Ginion Racing	1	0	0	N/A	0	0	NC
2012	NASCAR K&N Pro Series East	X Team Racing	1	0	0	N/A	N/A	25	70th
2012	NASCAR K&N Pro Series West	Andy Woolgar	1	0	0	N/A	N/A	43	50th
2012	ARCA Racing Series	Creation-Cope Racing	1	0	0	N/A	N/A	80	137th
2014	British Touring Car Championship	Crabbie's Racing	30	0	0	0	1	50	19th
2015	Ginetta GT4 Supercup	SV Racing Powered by John Crabbie	3	0	0	0	0	20	23rd
2015	British Touring Car Championship	Honda Yuasa Racing	Development driver						

^{†} As Clarke was a guest driver, he was ineligible to score points.

=== Complete Formula Two results ===
(key) (Races in bold indicate pole position) (Races in italics indicate fastest lap)

Year	1	2	3	4	5	6	7	8	9	10	11	12	13	14	15	16	17	18	Pos	Points
2009	VAL; 1; 13	VAL; 2; 19	BRN; 1 Ret	BRN; 2; 15	SPA; 1; 5	SPA; 2 Ret	BRH; 1 Ret	BRH; 2 Ret	DON; 1; 9	DON; 2; 14	OSC; 1; 7	OSC; 2 Ret	IMO; 1; 14	IMO; 2; 14	CAT; 1; 17	CAT; 2; 14			18th	6
2010	SIL; 1 Ret	SIL; 2; 4	MAR; 1 Ret	MAR; 2 Ret	MON; 1 Ret	MON; 2; 12	ZOL; 1 Ret	ZOL; 2; 4	ALG; 1; 3	ALG; 2 Ret	BRH; 1; 2	BRH; 2; 8	BRN; 1 Ret	BRN; 2; 9	OSC; 1; 12	OSC; 2 DNS	VAL; 1; 16	VAL; 2; 2	9th	81
2011	SIL; 1; 8	SIL; 2; 6	MAG; 1; 13	MAG; 2; 10	SPA; 1; 19	SPA; 2; 6	NÜR; 1; 3	NÜR; 2; 7	BRH; 1; 1	BRH; 2; 3	RBR; 1; 5	RBR; 2 Ret	MON; 1; 8	MON; 2; 7	CAT; 1; 7	CAT; 2; 9			8th	110

=== Complete British Touring Car Championship results ===
(key) Races in bold indicate pole position (1 point awarded – just in first race) Races in italics indicate fastest lap (1 point awarded) * signifies that driver lead race for at least one lap (1 point awarded)

Year	Team	Car	1	2	3	4	5	6	7	8	9	10	11	12	13	14	15	16	17	18	19	20	21	22	23	24	25	26	27	28	29	30	DC	Pts
2014	Crabbie's Racing	Ford Focus ST Mk.III	BRH; 1; 19	BRH; 2; 19	BRH; 3; 17	DON; 1; 25	DON; 2; 24	DON; 3; 15	THR; 1; 19	THR; 2; 17	THR; 3; 22	OUL; 1; 20	OUL; 2; 19	OUL; 3; 18	CRO; 1; 17	CRO; 2; 12	CRO; 3 Ret	SNE; 1; 19	SNE; 2; 25	SNE; 3; 22	KNO; 1; 18	KNO; 2; 13	KNO; 3; 14	ROC; 1; 18	ROC; 2; 15	ROC; 3; 14	SIL; 1; 13	SIL; 2; 10	SIL; 3; 13	BRH; 1; 15	BRH; 2; 10	**BRH**; **3**; 2*	**19th**	**50**
