= Emily Keene =

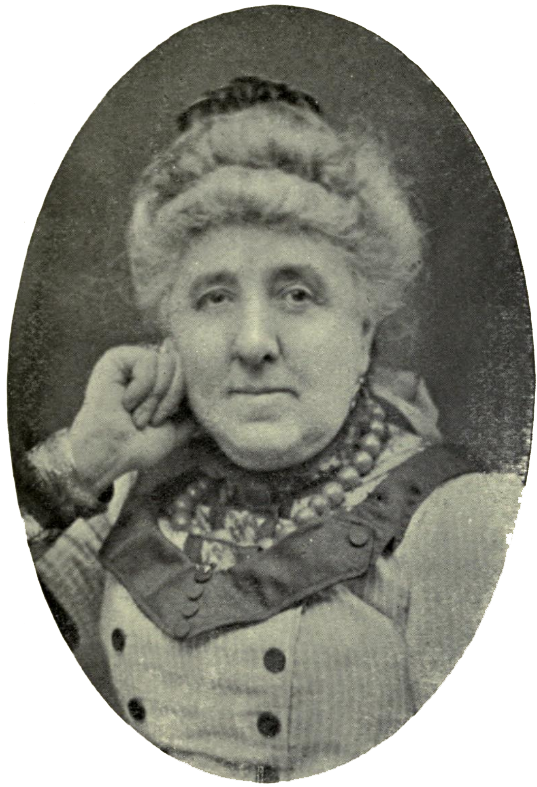
- Keene in 1910
- Born: 1849
- Died: 1944 (aged 94–95); Tangier, Morocco
- Occupation: Writer
- Notable work: My Life Story
- Spouse: Sharif of Ouzzane (m. 1873, divorced)
- Children: 2

Emily Keene, Cherifa of Wazan or Ouzzane of Morocco (1849–1944) was a British expatriate, adventurer, and travel writer. She went to Morocco in 1871 as a governess and fell in love with the Sharif of Ouzzane, a powerful regional governor in Morocco. She married the Sharif of Ouzzane in 1873 even though there was strong opposition from both families. This was one of the first widely known cases of interracial marriage between a British expatriate and a Moroccan. She is known for bringing vaccination to the region.

She had two sons, one of whom succeeded his father as the Sharif of Ouzzane. She eventually divorced the Sharif after finding out about an extramarital affair. The Sharif died in 1891. Keene's son Moulay Ali ben Abdeslam then became Sharif of the region. He served as an officer in the French Army.

She often wrote and took notes about her daily life, which were collected and published under the title My Life Story, published in 1912.

She died in 1944 in Tangier.
