= James F. Keene =

American music scholar

James F. Keene was an American music scholar who was a Professor Emeritus at University of Illinois, formerly Brownfield Distinguished Professor.

Keene was the guest conductor of the Naperville Municipal Band for its 2015 spring concert "On to San Antonio" in Naperville, IL.
