= Joseph Keene =

Soldier

- Born: April 3, 1839; England, United Kingdom
- Died: December 1, 1921 (aged 82); New York
- Burial place: Whitesboro, New York
- Military career
- Allegiance: United States of America
- Branch: United States Army
- Service years: 1861 - 1865
- Rank: Corporal
- Unit: (New York (state)) 26th New York Volunteer Infantry Regiment
- Conflicts: Battle of Fredericksburg; American Civil War
- Awards: Medal of Honor

Joseph Keene (April 3, 1839 – December 1, 1921) was an American soldier who fought in the American Civil War. Keene received his country's highest award for bravery during combat, the Medal of Honor. Keene's medal was won for his actions at the Battle of Fredericksburg in Virginia, where he voluntarily seized his regiments colors after several Color Bearers had been shot down and led his regiment in the charge on December 13, 1862. He was honored with the award on December 2, 1892.

Keene was born in England. He joined the 26th New York Infantry from Utica, New York in May 1861, and mustered out with this regiment after two years. He re-enlisted with the 3rd New York Heavy Artillery in June 1863, and mustered out with this regiment in July 1865. Keene was later buried in Whitesboro, New York.

== Medal of Honor citation ==
The President of the United States of America, in the name of Congress, takes pleasure in presenting the Medal of Honor to Private Joseph Keene, United States Army, for extraordinary heroism on 13 December 1862, while serving with Company B, 26th New York Infantry, in action at Fredericksburg, Virginia. Private Keene voluntarily seized the colors after several Color Bearers had been shot down and led the regiment in the charge.

== See also ==
- List of American Civil War Medal of Honor recipients: G–L
