= John Keene (cricketer) =

English cricketer

Evelyn Martin
Cricket information
- Batting: Left-handed
- Bowling: Left-arm slow-medium

Career statistics
Competition	First-class
Matches	27
Runs scored	115
Batting average	4.60
100s/50s	0/0
Top score	12
Balls bowled	3,453
Wickets	66
Bowling average	23.93
5 wickets in innings	5
10 wickets in match	1
Best bowling	6/22
Catches/stumpings	12/–
- Source: CricketArchive, 10 October 2022

John William Keene (25 April 1873 – 3 January 1931) was an English first-class cricketer who played for Surrey, Worcestershire and Scotland around the turn of the 20th century. Almost exclusively a bowler, his highest score in 36 innings was 12. He later stood twice as an umpire: in Scotland's home matches against the Australians and South Africans in 1912.

Having already made a number of appearances for Surrey Second XI, Keene's first-class debut for the county came against Warwickshire at Edgbaston in June 1897: he took 3–61 in the first innings, his maiden victim being Walter Quaife. He also played against Sussex at the end of the summer, but despite playing more games for the Second XI in subsequent seasons, those two appearances in 1897 were the total of his first-class career for Surrey.

Keene reappeared in county cricket in 1903, when he played 13 times for Worcestershire, and collected a season's best aggregate of 36 wickets at an average of 17.88. This included an outstanding performance against Leicestershire at Leicester, when he took 6-22 (his career best) in the first innings and 5–16 in the second; Worcestershire defeated their opponents by an innings and 110 runs. Earlier that summer he had bowled unchanged throughout Warwickshire's first innings with Ted Arnold: both men recorded figures of 5/44.

He played seven games in 1904, taking 6–81 against Gloucestershire at Bristol in August. The following year he turned out four more times, his best return again coming against Gloucestershire: the 5-24 he obtained at Gloucester in July. After that season, he was to play only one more first-class game, making a single appearance for Scotland, against the South Africans at Edinburgh in July 1907; his 17 wicketless overs went for 94.

Keene was born in Southwark, London; he died at the age of 57 in Crichton, Midlothian, Scotland.
