= Jack Keane (footballer) =

Australian rules footballer, born 1911

Personal information
- Full name: John Keane
- Born: 7 May 1911
- Died: 7 June 2005 (aged 94)
- Original team: Koroit
- Height: 185 cm (6 ft 1 in)
- Weight: 89 kg (196 lb)

Playing career^{1}
Years	Club	Games (Goals)
1935	Footscray	1 (0)
- ^{1} Playing statistics correct to the end of 1935.

Jack Keane (7 May 1911 – 7 June 2005) was a former Australian rules footballer who played with Footscray in the Victorian Football League (VFL).

A half-back and follower from Koroit, Keane signed with South Melbourne at the start of 1934 before opting to remain at Koroit that year. He made the move to Melbourne the following year, training at Footscray in the preseason before, at South Melbourne's urging, the permit committee determined that he was still a South Melbourne player. After a few games with the South Melbourne seconds which failed to impress the club, he was cleared to Footscray. His sole senior game for Footscray was in late 1935, ironically in a loss against South Melbourne. He was cleared to South Warrnambool at the start of 1936.
