= Judith Keene =

United States Coast Guard officer

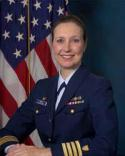
- Allegiance: United States of America
- Branch: United States Navy
- Service years: 1977–2008
- Rank: Captain
- Commands: Commandant of Cadets, US Coast Guard Academy
- Awards: Meritorious Service Medal with the Operational Distinguishing Device (3 awards), the Secretary of Transportation's Silver Medal, the Coast Guard Commendation Medal with the Operational Distinguishing Device (4 awards) and the Coast Guard Achievement Medal (2 awards)

Captain Judith Keene is a former Commandant of Cadets at the United States Coast Guard Academy. She was the 31st to hold the position and the first woman to ever do so. During her tenure, Keene had to deal with a court martial in which cadets testified that sexual assault issues at the academy were not taken seriously.
