= Charles Keene =

Charles Keene may refer to:

- Charles Keene (artist) (1823–1891), English artist and illustrator
- Charles Keene (archer) (1864–1926), British Olympic archer
- Charles Keene (racing driver) (fl. 1914), American racing driver
- Charles Keene (diplomat), United Kingdom chargé d'affaires to Sweden

== See also ==
- Charles Barton Keen (1868–1931), American architect
- Charles Kean (1811–1868), English actor
- Charles Keane (disambiguation)
