= John Keene (physicist) =

British physicist

John Philip Keene
- Born: 16 November 1921
- Died: 18 October 1991 (aged 69); Malaysia
- Education: King Edward's School, Birmingham
- Alma mater: University of Birmingham
- Occupation: Physicist
- Children: 3
- Relatives: Martyn Poliakoff (son-in-law)

John Philip Keene (16 November 1921 – 18 October 1991) was a British physicist known for his work in radiolysis. While working at Paterson Labs in Manchester, he created a pulse radiolysis apparatus that led to the discovery of the hydrated electron.
