= Marie Keen =

American politician (1895–1967)

Member of the Washington House of Representatives from the 18th district
- In office 1934–1936

Personal details
- Born: May 13, 1895 Kentucky
- Died: November 18, 1967 (aged 72) Kelso, Washington
- Party: Democrat

Marie Florence Keen (May 13, 1895 – November 18, 1967) was an American politician. She was a Republican, representing District 18 in the Washington House of Representatives which included Cowlitz County and Wahkiakum County, from 1934 to 1936.
