= Marshall F. Keen =

American politician

Member of the Georgia House of Representatives
- In office 1969–1970

Personal details
- Born: Marshall Fulton Keen; February 16, 1933 (age 93) Bibb County, Georgia, U.S.
- Party: Republican
- Spouse: Gudrun Jona Porkelsdottir Keen (died. 2021)
- Education: Georgia Tech

Marshall Fulton Keen (born February 16, 1933) is an American politician. He served as a Republican member of the Georgia House of Representatives.

== Life and career ==
Keen was born in Bibb County, Georgia. He attended Georgia Tech.

Keen served in the Georgia House of Representatives from 1969 to 1970.
