= Paul K. Keene =

American farmer

Paul K. Keene (October 12, 1910 – April 23, 2005) was one of the first organic farmers. He was the owner of Walnut Acres, in Penns Creek, Pennsylvania. There he produced various food products sold nationally in health food stores and via a mail-order catalog. The foods included free-range chicken; peanut, apple, and other butters; and granola. He was one of the pioneers of the idea of growing food without pesticides or chemical fertilizers.

He was born in Lititz, Pennsylvania. He earned an undergraduate degree at Lebanon Valley College and a master's degree in mathematics at Yale University. Before starting Walnut Acres, he taught mathematics at Drew University. He learned about organic farming from Sir Albert Howard while teaching in northern India. When he returned to the US, he studied further at the School of Living, in Suffern, New York and Kimberton Farm School in Pennsylvania.

While in India, he was involved with Mohandas Gandhi and the Indian independence movement.

He also met his wife while in India. Her name was Enid Betty Morgan, and she was the daughter of missionaries. They were married in 1940; she died in 1987.

His first big breakthrough in selling organic foods came when Clementine Paddleford, the New York Herald-Tribune food editor, was entranced by the farm's first product, Apple Essence, an apple butter.

Walnut Acres was started just after World War II. In 1994, it had sales of close to $8 million annually. Keene sold the company in 2000. It is no longer in business, but certain foods manufactured by the Hain Celestial Group, a natural-foods conglomerate, bear the "Walnut Acres Organic" label.
