= Donington Park =

Motorsport circuit in England

- Grand Prix Circuit (2010–present)
- Location: Leicestershire, England
- Coordinates: 52°49′45″N 1°22′30″W
- Capacity: 120,000
- FIA Grade: 2 (both layouts)
- Owner: MotorSport Vision (2017–2038)
- Operator: MotorSport Vision
- Opened: 1931; Re-opened: 1977
- Closed: 1940
- Construction cost: £12,000
- Major events: Current: World SBK (1988–2001, 2007–2009, 2011–2019, 2021–present); BTCC (1977–1979, 1981–present); British GT (1993–present); BSB (1990–2009, 2011–present); TCR UK (2018–present); Future: TCR Europe (2027); Former: F1 European Grand Prix (1993); Grand Prix motorcycle racing British motorcycle Grand Prix (1987–2009); Sidecar World Championship (1987–2001, 2008, 2014–2016, 2021–2022); FIA WTCC Race of UK (2011); ELMS 6 Hours of Donington (2006, 2012); DTM (2002–2003); FIM EWC (1981–1982, 1987); FIA GT (1997–1999, 2002–2004); World Sportscar Championship (1989–1990, 1992); FIA GT1 World Championship (2012)
- Website: https://www.donington-park.co.uk/

Grand Prix Circuit (1986–present)
- Length: 4.020 km (2.498 mi)
- Turns: 12
- Race lap record: 1:17.707 ( (Japan) Kimiya Sato, Lola B05/52, 2013, Auto GP)

National Circuit with realigned Goddards Chicane (2010–present)
- Length: 3.149 km (1.957 mi)
- Turns: 10
- Race lap record: 0:57.221 ( (Netherlands) Marijn van Kalmthout, Benetton B197, 2011, F1)

National Circuit (1977–2009)
- Length: 3.149 km (1.957 mi)
- Turns: 10
- Race lap record: 0:55.859 ( (United Kingdom) Scott Mansell, Benetton B197 Judd, 2004, EuroBOSS/F1)

Grand Prix Circuit (1937–1939)
- Length: 5.029 km (3.125 mi)
- Turns: 15
- Race lap record: 2:11.4 ( (Germany) Bernd Rosemeyer/ (Germany) Manfred von Brauchitsch, Auto Union Type C/Mercedes-Benz W125, 1937, GP)

Grand Prix Circuit (1935–1936)
- Length: 4.107 km (2.552 mi)
- Turns: 13
- Race lap record: 2:08.4 ( (Italy) Giuseppe Farina, Maserati V8RI, 1935, GP)

Original Circuit (1931–1934)
- Length: 3.518 km (2.186 mi)
- Turns: 13
- Race lap record: 2:06.0 ( (United Kingdom) Earl Howe, Bugatti Type 51, 1933, GP)

The Donington Circuit layout in 1937

Donington Park is a motorsport circuit located near Castle Donington in Leicestershire, England. The circuit business is now owned by Jonathan Palmer's MotorSport Vision organisation, and the surrounding Donington Park Estate, still owned by the Wheatcroft family, is currently under lease by MotorSport Vision until 2038. It has a capacity of 120,000, and is also the venue of the Download Festival.

Originally part of the Donington Hall estate, it was created as a racing circuit during the period between the First and Second World Wars when the German Silver Arrows were battling for the European Championship. Used as a military vehicle storage depot during the Second World War, it fell into disrepair until bought by local construction entrepreneur Tom Wheatcroft. Revived under his ownership in the 1970s, it hosted a single Formula One race in 1993, but became the favoured home of the British round of the MotoGP motorcycling championship.

Leased by Donington Ventures Leisure Ltd in 2007 the hope that Formula One racing could return to the track, the incomplete venture failed to raise sufficient financial backing during the aftermath of the 2008 financial crisis. DVLL consequently lost the rights to the British rounds of both Formula 1 and MotoGP series, and in its bankruptcy returned the track to the Wheatcroft family in December 2009.

Under Wheatcroft's ownership, the venue underwent significant work, with the track restored to use in autumn 2010, before major upgrades in the following five years. At the end of 2010, it was announced that Donington would become home to an annual historic motorsport event, the Donington Historic Festival, with new events constantly being added. Since 2010, significant investment across the venue has seen major improvements made to its infrastructure, while the circuit has become a regular fixture for top class motorcycling in the form of the Superbike World Championship.

In January 2017, the circuit business and a long-term lease on the estate was purchased by MotorSport Vision, with the purchase cleared by authorities in August of the same year. Significant investment has seen facilities at the venue brought up to modern standards, with a new restaurant, toilet blocks, large new grandstand and new circuit offices, as well as other detail changes. As well as improving the infrastructure, MSV made additions to the race calendar, with additional major events planned for 2019 which included extra rounds of the British Superbike Championship and British GT.

== History ==
=== Creation and pre-war racing ===
Donington Park motor racing circuit was the first permanent park circuit in England, which also ended the race circuit monopoly that Brooklands had held since 1907.

Fred Craner was a former motorcycle rider who had taken part in seven Isle of Man TT races, and was by 1931 a Derby garage owner and secretary of the Derby & District Motor Club. Craner approached John Gillies Shields, the owner of the Donington Hall estate, to use the extensive roads on his land for racing.

The original track was 2.186 mi (3.518 km) in length, and based on normal width unsealed estate roads. The first motor cycle race took place on Whit Monday (25 May) 1931. For 1933 Craner obtained permission to build a permanent track, with the original layout widened and sealed at a cost of £12,000. The first car race was held on 25 March, followed by three car meetings further that year. The first Donington Park Trophy race was held on 7 October 1933, and the 20-lap invitation event was won by the Earl Howe in a Bugatti Type 51.

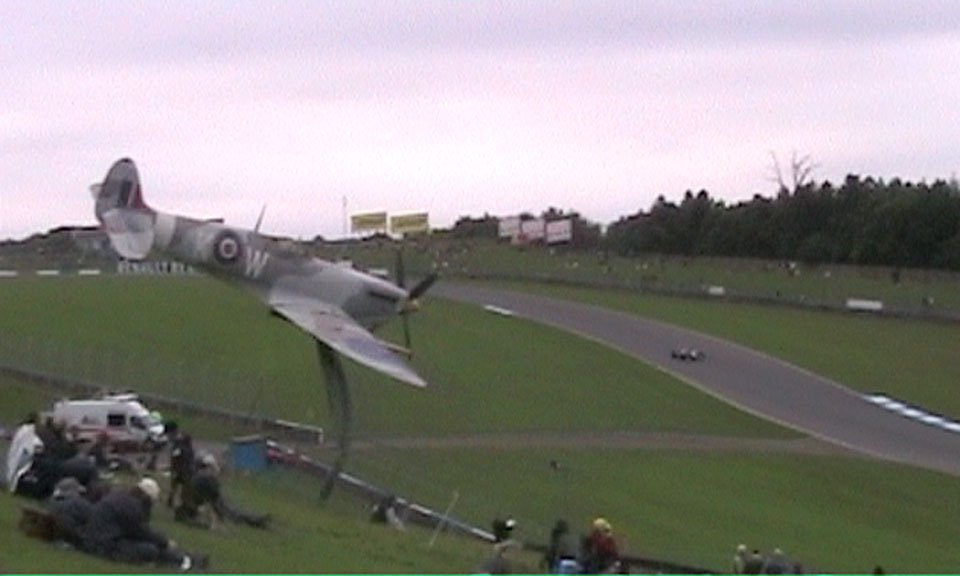
Donington Park showing Spitfire sculpture and track (2005)

In 1935 the first 300-mile (480 km) Donington Grand Prix was won by Richard "Mad Jack" Shuttleworth in an Alfa Romeo P3. In the 1937 Donington Grand Prix and 1938 Donington Grand Prix, the race winners were respectively Bernd Rosemeyer and Tazio Nuvolari, both in Auto Union 'Silver Arrows.'

The circuit at Donington Park was closed in 1940 due to World War II, when it was requisitioned by the Ministry of Defence and was converted into a military vehicle depot. It was "derequisitioned" in 1956 and approved for racing by local planning authorities in 1957.

=== Wheatcroft revival (1971–2006) ===
In 1971 the park was bought by business man and car collector Tom Wheatcroft, who funded the rebuilding of the track. Wheatcroft moved his collection to a museum known as the Donington Grand Prix Exhibition which opened in 1973, and had the largest collection of Grand Prix cars in the world until its closure in 2018.

Wheatcroft had to battle against Leicestershire County Council, which had refused to allow planning consent for a return to racing, but Wheatcroft successfully appealed and had laid out the track by early 1976.

The first postwar race meeting was for motorcycles held on Sunday, 15 May 1977, organised by The Pathfinders and Derby Motor Club. The motor racing circuit re-opened for cars on Saturday 28 May 1977. The first postwar car race meeting was organised by the Nottingham Sports Car Club, sponsored by local Lotus dealers, J A Else of Codnor. That first car meeting nearly did not happen, as the local ramblers tried to assert their rights to retain access to footpaths at the eleventh hour. The meeting went ahead as a "Motor Trial", a legal loophole that curtailed the use of single seater racing cars for that opening meeting. The NSCC continued to run race meetings at Donington until the Donington Racing Club was formed and a licence to run race meetings obtained.

The Melbourne Loop was built in 1985 to increase the lap distance to 2.498 mi (4.020 km) and allow the track to host Grand Prix motorcycle races. At the previously 1.957 mi (3.149 km) the circuit was deemed too short. The shorter layout remains as the "National" circuit, which is used for most non-Grand Prix events.

Near the end of the 20th century Donington has held meetings of MotoGP, the British Touring Car Championship and British Superbike Championship, as well as the 1993 European Grand Prix.

Other events taking place at the track include a 1000 km endurance race for the Le Mans Series in 2006, the World Series by Renault and the Great and British Motorsport Festival. On 26 August 2007, the circuit hosted the British Motocross Grand Prix, with a purpose-built motocross circuit constructed on the infield of the road circuit.

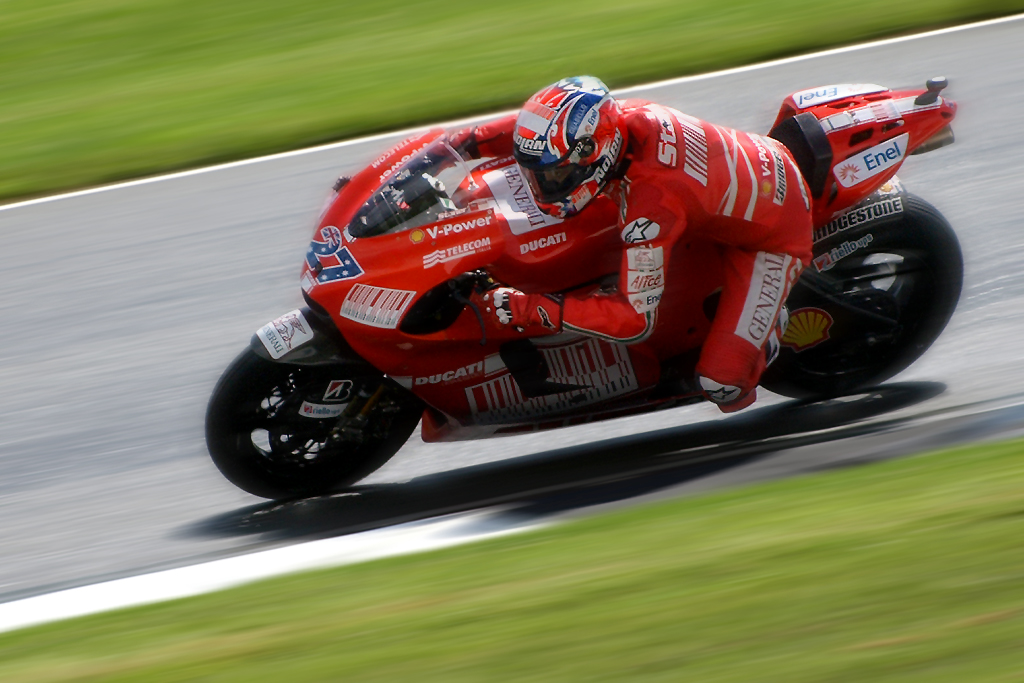
Casey Stoner at the 2009 British motorcycle Grand Prix.

=== Donington Ventures Leisure (2007–2009) ===
In 2007, Wheatcroft via the holding company Wheatcroft & Son Ltd, sold a 150-year lease on the land on which the track and museum are located to Donington Ventures Leisure Ltd (DVLL).

In July 2008, it was announced that DVLL had won the rights to the British Grand Prix for 17 years from July 2010, with North West Leicestershire council approving plans for the required track and facility rebuilt design by Hermann Tilke to be constructed from January 2009.

On 27 and 28 September 2008, the Motocross des Nations, the biggest and longest running event in World Championship Motocross, was at Donington Park.

It soon became clear that DVLL, led by Simon Gillett, was in serious financial difficulty. Chris Sylt, a respected journalist specialising in the financial side of Formula One, questioned Simon Gillett's track record, citing an earlier failure of his company Innovation Motorsport, owing £200,000, and his apparent lack of experience.

In April 2009, Wheatcroft & Son Ltd took legal action against DVLL in Derby County Court, seeking £2.47m in rent arrears, as well as forfeiture of the lease. The legal action put the future of the British Grand Prix in doubt, with Bernie Ecclestone restating that if Donington did not meet required standards to host the event, there will be no British Grand Prix from 2010.

On 5 June 2009, it was announced that an out of court settlement had been reached between Wheatcroft & Son Ltd and DVLL.

On 24 October 2009, media sources reported that Donington had failed to raise the £135 million needed to stage a British Grand Prix. The BBC commented in its coverage that: "Donington's bid looks over, and that Ecclestone has offered the race to Silverstone." Although DVLL gave further public relations assurance that it would be able to raise the required finance and host the Grand Prix, on 29 October 2009, Ecclestone confirmed that the British Grand Prix would not be held at Donington.

On 18 November 2009, the company went into administration with debts to contractors and suppliers approaching £4 million and a secured loan of £14 million with Anglo Irish Bank, according to the Administrator's report. Acting chairman Mr Price said: "This need not be the end of Formula One racing at Donington. It still remains a fantastic location. It needs people of vision to get the dream to the starting grid. We are certainly hopeful that a 2011 Grand Prix could take place at the site."

On 7 December 2009, Formula One Management announced that Silverstone had been awarded a 17-year contract to hold the British Grand Prix from 2010 until 2026.

On 11 December 2009, it was announced that DVLL had lost the rights to hold the British Superbike Championship race due to be held on 10–12 September 2010. These dates will now be used for a race at Croft.

=== Return to Wheatcroft family (2009–2017) ===
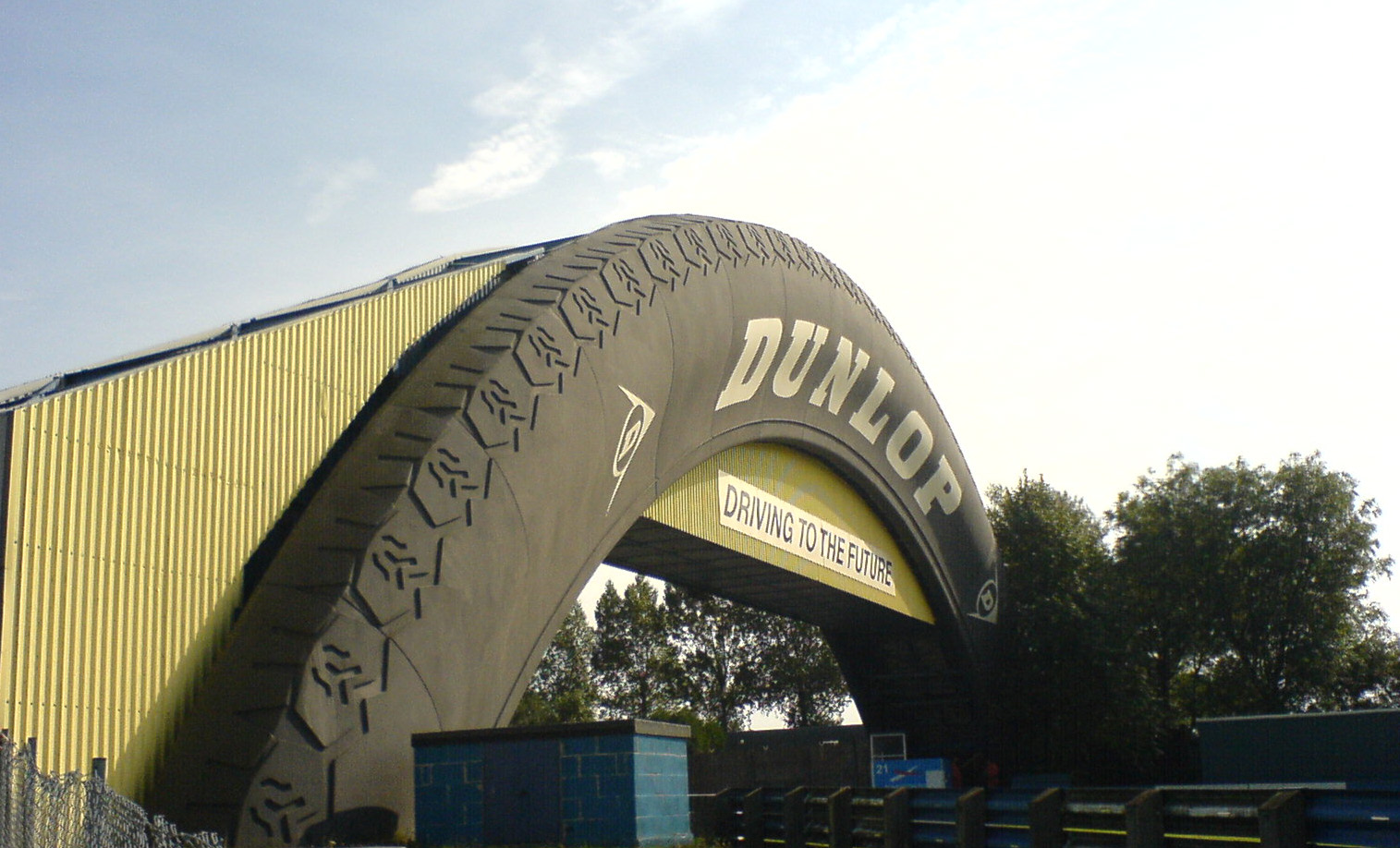
Donington's Dunlop Bridge

On 24 December 2009 it was announced that a buyer for Donington Ventures Leisure had not been found, which thus meant that the 150-year lease given by Wheatcroft & Son Ltd to Donington Ventures Leisure was terminated. The ownership immediately reverted to Wheatcroft & Son Ltd, now led by Kevin Wheatcroft in light of the death of his father in 2009. Wheatcroft vowed to re-open Donington Park as soon as possible. There were hopes to re-open the circuit in August 2010, and this was accomplished with the Donington Revival meeting.

On 26 May 2010 Wheatcroft announced that the lease for Donington Park had been sold (Subject To Contract) to Worcestershire-based Adroit Group. Adroit proceeded to resurrect the circuit, not only rebuilding the removed track sections, but also renewing infrastructure. This included the re-alignment of Foggy's bend, but not the old Dunlop Bridge due to new built MSA/FIA regulations. As a result of a series of inspections, the circuit successfully regained its ACU, MSA and FIA Grade 2 licences. However, Wheatcrofts and Adroit failed to agree terms of a final lease contract, and hence terminated their outline agreement.

The Wheatcroft-owned company Donington Park Racing took control of the circuit in late 2010, gaining events from both World Touring Cars and the World Superbikes, plus the inaugural Donington Historic Festival.

60 race days are held each year, including events from the British Touring Car Championship, British Superbikes, World Superbikes, British GT, rallying and historic festivals for both cars and motorcycles. Racing takes place on most weekends between March and October, with visits from most British racing clubs. Donington has also been host to the annual Season Launch for the BTCC since 2013, while the British Superbike Championship also holds major test days at the circuit.

The FIA Formula E Championship and its teams also constructed its headquarters at the circuit in the early years of its competition. All teams in the electric series were based at the venue, and Donington hosted several pre-season test dates before each season, some of which were open to spectators. For the 2017–18 season, the series switched their pre-season test venue to the Circuit Ricardo Tormo in Valencia, Spain.

Wheatcroft has also invested heavily to restore the circuit infrastructure to its former glories. The infield which was excavated during the late 2000s has been completely restored and raised even higher in some areas, while pit and paddock facilities have also been improved. Outside the circuit boundaries, an all terrain course has been constructed, as well as improvements to hospitality buildings and conferencing suites.

=== Purchase by MotorSport Vision (2017–present) ===
In January 2017, the circuit business was taken over by MotorSport Vision, with the Donington Park Estate on a 21-year lease, until 2038. The purchase was cleared by the Competition and Markets Authority in August 2017, with work commencing almost immediately on venue improvements.

Additions over the winter period of 2017-18 included a full resurface of paddock areas and access roads, the addition of the Garage 39 Restaurant, cafe and bar, and a large new grandstand at Hollywood corner. Several old toilet blocks were also demolished to make way for more modern units. while detail changes were carried out around the venue. The circuit office was also relocated to a newer building within the paddock.

For 2019, work was completed on a new main entrance area near the existing paddock entrance, that better separates pedestrians from vehicle traffic.

In April 2021 MSV announced it had purchased the freehold of the Donington Hall Estate comprising Donington Hall itself, former office building Hastings House and the Lansdowne workshops building. The estate is set in 28 acres of grounds next to the Donington Park race circuit. MSV plans to develop the Grade II* listed Hall into a 40-bedroom hotel, scheduled to open in 2023. Hastings House will become the Donington Hall Motorhouse, a stabling facility for supercars, classic road and racing cars and motorcycles, whilst the Lansdowne workshops, will be available to let for high-end motor engineering businesses which support the preparation and maintenance of vehicles kept at the Donington Hall Motorhouse and used on the race circuit.

== Motorsport at Donington ==
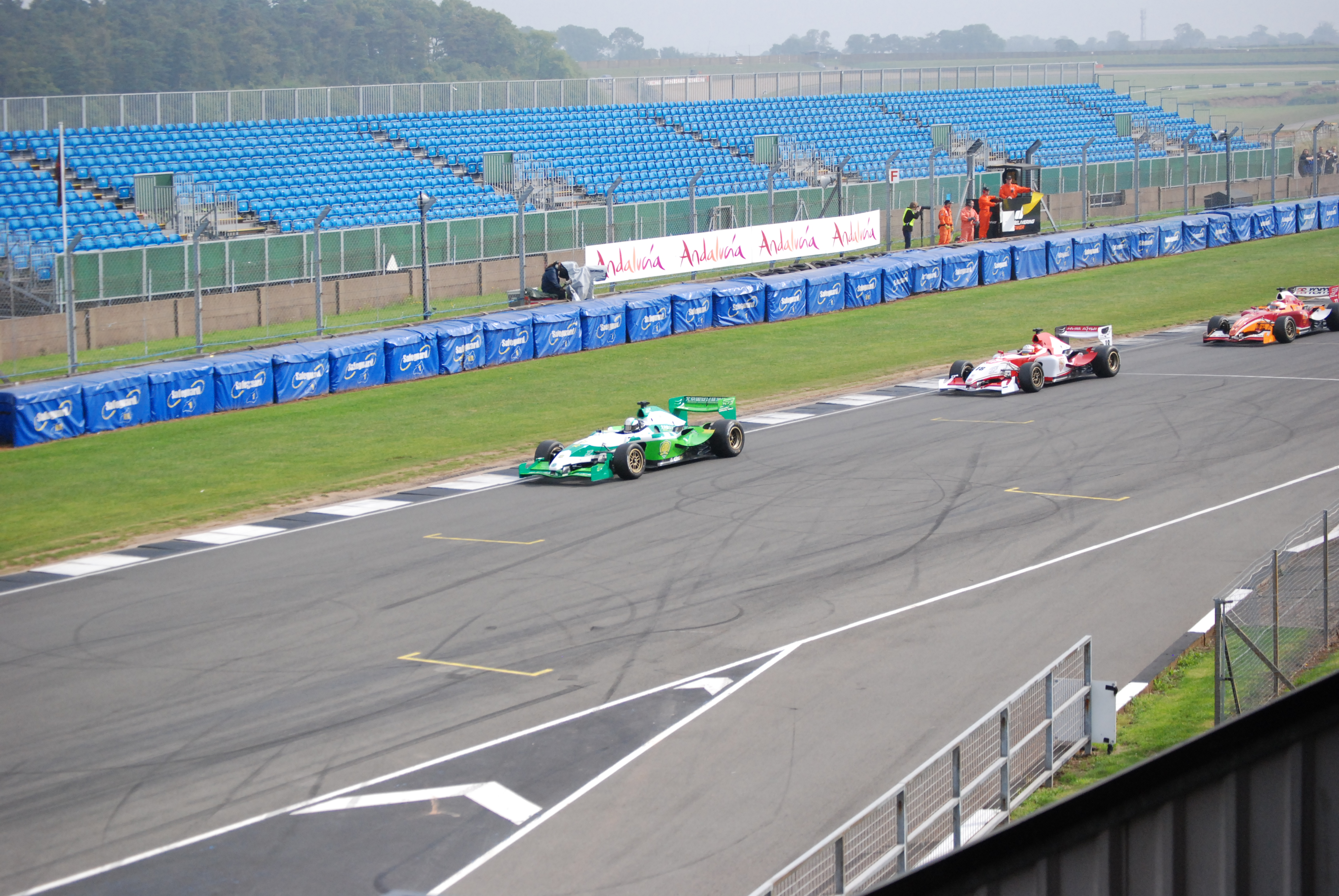
Superleague Formula cars on the Wheatcroft Straight at Donington Park in 2008

Donington Park has long been home to many prestigious motorsport events including BTCC, British F3, British Superbike Championship, WorldSBK, Superleague Formula, Truck Racing.

=== Formula One ===
==== 1993 European Grand Prix ====
Donington Park was the host of the 1993 European Grand Prix on 11 April 1993. The race, which was affected by rain, was notable for the dominance of Ayrton Senna where he won the race by over 1 minute from Damon Hill, having advanced from fifth to first in the opening lap.

This race was described by AtlasF1 as the 'Drive of the Decade'. There is a memorial to Senna in the grounds of the racetrack, outside the Donington Collections.

==== Failed 2010 British Grand Prix bid ====
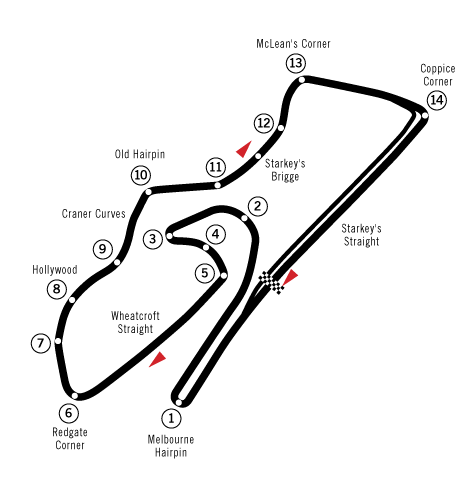
Proposed 2010 circuit

On 4 July 2008 Bernie Ecclestone announced that Donington Park would hold the British Grand Prix from 2010 onwards in a 17-year deal, having been hosted exclusively by Silverstone since 1987. On 10 July 2008, the proposal was that the track would have a major upgrade designed by Hermann Tilke, to include an entirely new pit complex along Starkey's Straight and increasing the circuit length to 2.944 mi (4.738 km), by the addition of a new infield loop, to get it up to the standards required for modern day Formula One racing.

The proposal included that the racetrack would be the first to be accessed only by public transportation, with spectators' cars not being allowed to enter the facility. This was in part an answer to the lack of road access, which regularly resulted in long tailbacks, for example when 30,000 bikers exited major motorcycle events. A shuttle-bus service would run from the close by East Midlands Parkway station, on the Midland Main Line from London to Sheffield.

Due to the 2008 financial crisis and Donington's potential inability to raise the necessary funds, Bernie Ecclestone stated on 20 June 2009 that the 2010 British Grand Prix would be held at Silverstone if Donington was not ready to host it. This was a change from his previous "Donington or nothing" standpoint and he cited changes in the structure of the BRDC, meaning there was a better way of negotiating with them over future commercial rights. Furthermore, during an interview with the BBC about the Formula One Teams Association threatening to break away and form their own series, FIA president Max Mosley said it was "highly likely" the 2010 British Grand Prix would return to Silverstone.

Donington was given an extended two-week deadline to prove their financing to host the 2010 British Grand Prix. This did not work out, as fundraising attempts fell through on 22 October 2009. Consequently, Bernie Ecclestone confirmed a few days after, that Donington would not be hosting the British Grand Prix.

On 18 November 2009, less than one month after it was confirmed that the Donington had lost the right to host the British Grand Prix, circuit owner Donington Ventures Leisure Limited was placed into administration. Ecclestone initially had promised potential new owners the option of reviving the deal, but in December 2009 Silverstone won the contract for the next 17 years.

=== Motorcycle Grands Prix (1987–2009) ===
Donington Park has also been the home of Grand Prix motorcycle racing. After the Isle of Man TT Races lost World Championship status, from the 1977 UK inaugural race, GP racing was held at Silverstone until 1986. For the next 23 years, Donington held the race up until 2009, but in light of the proposed Donington Formula 1 deal, Grand Prix organisers Dorna Sports agreed a five-year deal with Silverstone from 2010. Following the failed 2010 Formula 1 bid, in less than a year Donington had lost both competitions for the foreseeable future.

Donington Park was proposed to host the British Grand Prix as an alternative venue chosen for 2015, since the Circuit of Wales, having won the Dorna contract from 2015, was a failed proposal. However, in February 2015, it was announced that Donington had called off the deal, and that 2015 Grands Prix would likely remain at Silverstone.

=== British Touring Car Championship (BTCC) ===
Donington Park has been a mainstay of the BTCC calendar, since the series was created in 1987 (as a development from the previous British Saloon Car Championship). In 1999 Donington was the location of one of the standout events from the BTCC's Super Touring era. Matt Neal caused a sensation by winning a race in his Nissan Primera, the first 'Independent' to do so in the modern era. This won him a £250,000 prize from BTCC series promoter Alan Gow.

=== FIA World Touring Car Championship (2011) ===
After five years at Brands Hatch, the WTCC moved to Donington Park in 2011. The event attracted thousands of people on race day, where the two races were both won by Yvan Muller for Chevrolet. The weekend also had two races for the Auto GP series as well as the Maserati Trofeo. World Touring Cars (in WTCC, WTCR or TCR World Tour guises) have not returned to the UK since.

=== DTM ===
Donington hosted rounds of the German DTM (Deutsche Tourenwagen Masters) series in 2002 and 2003. Former F1 driver Jean Alesi secured a clean sweep of wins across both years for AMG Mercedes.

=== Rallying ===
Donington Park hosted stages of the RAC Rally between 1981 and 1998. Donington is the venue for two rallies, with one of the events being a round of the MSN Circuit Rally Championship. These events do not take place exclusively on the circuit, including sections on the looser sections surrounding the track itself.

=== Sports cars / GTs ===
Donington was one of the venues for the 2001 European Le Mans Series season. It was a series for Le Mans Prototypes (LMP) and Grand Touring (GT) race cars run by IMSA. The ill-fated series began in March 2001 and ended in October that year after only seven races. The Donington winner was Audi Sport Team Joest with drivers Tom Kristensen and Rinaldo Capello.

Donington was also a venue for races in the FIA GT Championship from 1997 to 1999 and then 2002 to 2004.

=== Layout history ===
Donington Park layout history
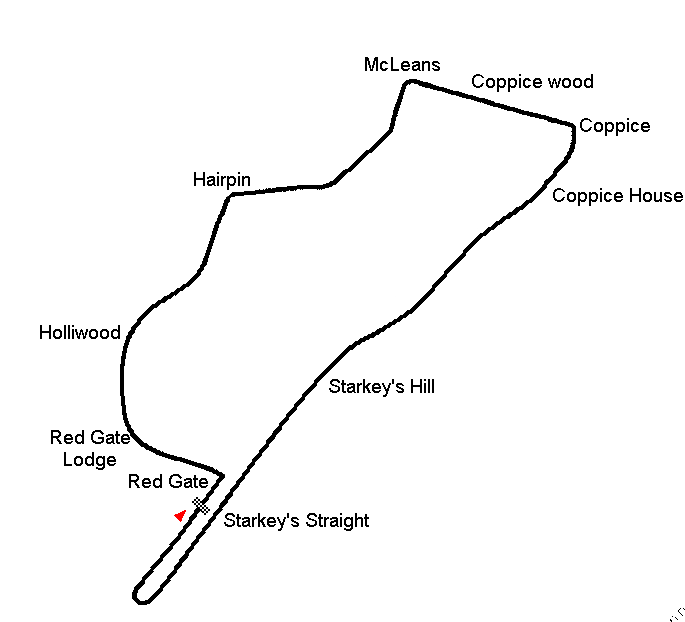
Donington Park (1935–1936)

Donington Park (1937–1939)

National Circuit (1977–2009)

Grand Prix Circuit (1986–2009)

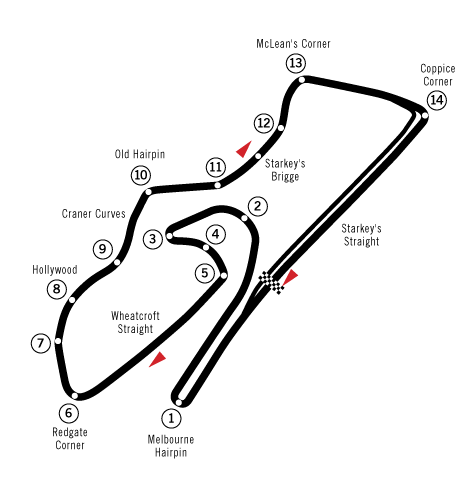
Grand Prix Circuit layout proposal for 2010 F1 race

Grand Prix Circuit (2010–present)

== Lap records ==
The unofficial all-time track record set during a race weekend is 1:10.458, set by Alain Prost in a Williams FW15C, during second (final) qualifying for the 1993 European Grand Prix. As of October 2026, the fastest official race lap records at the Donington Park Circuit are listed as:

Category	Time	Driver	Vehicle	Event
Grand Prix Circuit (1986–present): 4.020 km (2.498 mi)
Auto GP	1:17.707	Kimiya Sato	Lola B05/52	2013 Donington Auto GP round
Formula One	1:18.029	Ayrton Senna	McLaren MP4/8	1993 European Grand Prix
Formula Renault 3.5	1:18.424	Félix Porteiro	Dallara T05	2005 Donington Formula Renault 3.5 Series round
Group C	1:19.380	Mauro Baldi	Peugeot 905 Evo 1 Bis	1992 500 km of Donington
Superleague Formula	1:19.400	Antônio Pizzonia	Panoz DP09	2009 Donington Park Superleague Formula round
GB3	1:20.829	Nikita Bedrin	Tatuus MSV GB3-025	2026 Donington GB3 round
F3000	1:20.970	Gil de Ferran	Reynard 93D	1993 Donington F3000 round
LMP2	1:21.336	Brendon Hartley	Oreca 03	2012 6 Hours of Donington
LMP1	1:21.527	Jamie Campbell-Walter	Creation CA06/H	2006 1000 km of Donington
LMP900	1:22.043	Tom Kristensen	Audi R8	2001 ELMS at Donington Park
Formula Three	1:22.600	Alex Lynn	Dallara F312	2012 Donington British F3 round
F2 (2009–2012)	1:24.135	Julien Jousse	Williams JPH1	2009 Donington Formula Two round
WSC	1:24.958	Vincenzo Sospiri	Ferrari 333 SP	1998 RAC Tourist Trophy
GT3	1:24.977	Euan Hankey	McLaren 720S GT3 Evo	2023 1st Donington British GT round
World SBK	1:25.124	Sam Lowes	Ducati Panigale V4 R	2026 Donington World SBK round
GT1 (Prototype)	1:25.550	Bernd Schneider	Mercedes CLK LM	1998 FIA GT Donington 500km
Superkart	1:25.888	Peter Elkmann	Anderson DEA Superkart	2017 MSA British Superkart GP
LMP675	1:27.194	Hayanari Shimoda	DBA4-03S	2003 FIA Sportscar Championship Donington
GB4	1:27.427	Ary Bansal	Tatuus MSV GB4-025	2025 1st Donington GB4 round
Formula Nissan	1:27.776	Patrice Gay	Coloni CN1	1998 Donington Euro Open by Nissan round
FIA Cup	1:28.027	Will Hoy	Spice SE89C	1992 500 km of Donington
LMPC	1:28.033	Thomas Dagoneau	Oreca FLM09	2012 6 Hours of Donington
GT1 (GTS)	1:28.151	Stéphane Ortelli	Saleen S7-R	2006 1000 km of Donington
Formula 4	1:28.198	Mika Abrahams	Tatuus F4-T421	2023 2nd Donington British F4 round
IMSA GTP	1:28.440	David Kennedy	Mazda 767B	1989 480 km of Donington
Group C2	1:28.550	Fermin Velez	Spice SE89C	1989 480 km of Donington
World SSP	1:28.637	Yari Montella	Ducati Panigale V2	2024 Donington World SSP round
MotoGP	1:28.714	Dani Pedrosa	Honda RC211V	2006 British motorcycle Grand Prix
Formula Renault 2.0	1:28.877	Frank Kechele	Tatuus FR2000	2007 Donington Eurocup Formula Renault 2.0 round
CN	1:29.000	Darren Burke	Juno CN2012	2012 Donington Speed Euroseries round
Porsche Carrera Cup	1:29.022	Callum Voisin	Porsche 911 (992 II) Cup	2026 2nd Donington Porsche Carrera Cup GB round
LM GTE	1:29.634	Jonny Cocker	Ferrari 458 Italia GT2	2012 6 Hours of Donington
DTM	1:29.640	Bernd Schneider	AMG Mercedes-Benz CLK DTM 2003	2003 Donington DTM round
Radical Cup	1:29.657	Abbi Pulling	Radical SR10	2022 Donington Radical Cup UK round
Formula Palmer Audi	1:29.722	Jason Moore	Formula Palmer Audi car	2008 Donington Formula Palmer Audi round
GT4	1:31.603	Joe Marshall	Porsche 718 Cayman GT4 RS Clubsport	2024 Donington Porsche Sprint Challenge Great Britain round
Formula Ford	1:31.730	Antti Buri	Mygale M12-SJ	2012 Donington Formula Ford round
Class 1 Touring Cars	1:32.030	Bernd Schneider	AMG Mercedes-Benz C-Klasse	1995 Donington DTM round
N-GT	1:32.034	Lucas Luhr	Porsche 911 (996) GT3-RSR	2004 FIA GT Donington 500km
250cc	1:32.474	Marco Simoncelli	Gilera RSA 250	2008 British motorcycle Grand Prix
500cc	1:32.661	Simon Crafar	Yamaha YZR500	1998 British motorcycle Grand Prix
TCR Touring Car	1:33.250	Sam Laidlaw	Cupra León VZ TCR	2025 2nd Donington TCR UK round
GT2	1:33.338	Olivier Beretta	Chrysler Viper GTS-R	1999 FIA GT Donington 500km
NGTC	1:33.381	Adam Morgan	Mercedes-AMG A35 Saloon	2026 2nd Donington BTCC round
GT1	1:33.470	John Nielsen	McLaren F1 GTR	1995 4 Hours of Donington
Sportbike	1:33.937	Harrison Dessoy	Triumph Daytona 660	2025 1st Donington British Sportbike round
GT	1:34.362	Fredrik Ekblom	BMW M3 GTR	2001 ELMS at Donington Park
FIA GT Group 2	1:34.758	Nigel Greensall	TVR Tuscan T400R	2004 FIA GT Donington 500km
Eurocup Mégane Trophy	1:34.774	Jaap van Lagen	Renault Mégane Renault Sport	2006 Donington Eurocup Mégane Trophy round
Group A	1:36.200	Frank Biela	Audi V8 Quattro	1991 Donington DTM round
BMW F900R Cup	1:36.579	Nikki Coates	BMW F900R	2026 Donington BMW F900R Cup round
Super Touring	1:37.084	Alain Menu	Renault Laguna BTCC	1997 1st Donington BTCC round
125cc	1:37.312	Álvaro Bautista	Aprilia RS125R	2006 British motorcycle Grand Prix
Super 2000	1:37.380	Robert Huff	Chevrolet Cruze 1.6T	2011 FIA WTCC Race of UK
Moto3	1:37.788	Marco Holt	Honda NSF250R	2026 2nd Donington Moto4 British Cup round
World WCR	1:38.908	Paola Ramos	Yamaha YZF-R7	2026 Donington World WCR round
BTC Touring	1:41.211	James Thompson	BTC-T Vauxhall Astra Coupe	2002 Donington BTCC round
Supersport 300	1:42.132	Andy Verdoïa	Yamaha YZF-R3	2019 Donington Supersport 300 round
Mini Challenge	1:45.549	Chris Smith	Mini John Cooper Works	2013 Donington Mini Challenge round
Formula Vee	1:46.320	Paul Smith	Formula Vee	2013 Donington Formula Vee round
National Circuit with realigned Goddards Chicane (2010–present): 3.149 km (1.957 mi)
BOSS GP/F1	0:57.221	Marijn van Kalmthout	Benetton B197	2011 Donington BOSS GP round
LMP1	0:58.880	Lawrence Tomlinson	Ginetta-Zytek GZ09S	2024 Donington Masters Historic round
LMP2	1:01.116	Alfie Briggs	HPD ARX-04b	2024 Donington Masters Historic round
LMP3	1:01.783	Jack Fabby	Duqueine D08	2024 Donington Masters Historic round
Superkart	1:04.188	Liam Morley	Anderson VM Superkart	2023 Donington Superkart Super Series round
GT3	1:04.386	Danny Winstanley	Audi R8 LMS ultra	2026 Donington GT3 Legends round
Ferrari Challenge	1:04.536	Gilbert Yates	Ferrari 296 Challenge	2026 Donington Ferrari Challenge UK round
Formula 4	1:04.596	Noah Lisle	Tatuus F4-T421	2023 1st Donington British F4 round
Porsche Carrera Cup	1:05.537	Jack Sherwood	Porsche 911 (992 II) Cup	2026 1st Donington Porsche Carrera Cup GB round
Superbike	1:05.723	Kyle Ryde	Yamaha YZF-R1	2022 1st Donington BSB round
GT4	1:07.284	Joshua Rogers	Porsche 718 Cayman GT4 RS Clubsport	2026 Donington Porsche Sprint Challenge Great Britain round
NGTC	1:07.944	Ashley Sutton	Ford Focus Titanium	2026 1st Donington BTCC round
Supersport	1:08.035	Jack Kennedy	Yamaha YZF-R6	2022 1st Donington BSS round
TCR Touring Car	1:08.920	Harry Bloor	Honda Civic Type R TCR (FL5)	2026 1st Donington TCR UK round
Super 2000	1:12.082	Jason Plato	Chevrolet Cruze 1.6T	2010 Donington BTCC round
Moto3	1:15.185	Bailey Stuart-Campbell	Honda NSF250R	2021 1st Donington British Talent Cup round
Truck racing	1:25.286	Ryan Smith	Daimler Freightliner	2024 Donington BTRC round
National Circuit (1977–2009): 3.149 km (1.957 mi)
EuroBOSS/F1	0:55.859	Scott Mansell	Benetton B197 Judd	2004 1st Donington EuroBOSS round
Formula 3000	0:59.960	Gareth Rees	Reynard 95D	1996 1st Donington British F2 round
WSC	1:01.010	Giovanni Lavaggi	Kremer-Porsche CK7 Spyder	1993 Donington Interserie round
Interserie	1:01.010	Walter Lechner	Reynard Spyder Judd Can-Am	1993 Donington Interserie round
Formula Three	1:01.375	Jaime Alguersuari	Dallara F308	2008 Donington British F3 round
Group C	1:02.970	Robbie Stirling	Lola T92/10	1995 Donington Interserie round
Formula Two	1:03.820	Corrado Fabi	March 822	1982 Donington F2 round
GT1	1:05.099	Tim Sugden	McLaren F1 GTR	1999 Donington British GT round
Formula Palmer Audi	1:06.232	Stefan Wilson	Formula Palmer Audi car	2007 Donington Formula Palmer Audi round
GT2	1:08.368	Nathan Kinch	Ferrari 360 GTC	2005 Donington British GT round
Formula BMW	1:10.827	Matthew Howson	Mygale FB02	2004 Donington Formula BMW UK round
Group 5	1:10.960	Harald Ertl	Ford Capri Turbo	1980 1st International Group 5 race
Super Touring	1:10.983	Alain Menu	Ford Mondeo Zetec	2000 1st Donington BTCC round
Super 2000	1:12.677	Jason Plato	SEAT León TDi	2008 Donington BTCC round
BTC Touring	1:12.889	Yvan Muller	BTC-T Vauxhall Astra Sport Hatch	2005 Donington BTCC round
BMW M1 Procar	1:13.010	Jan Lammers	BMW M1 Procar	1980 Donington BMW M1 Procar round
World SBK	1:13.260	Raymond Roche	Ducati 851	1989 Donington World SBK round
Ferrari Challenge	1:13.881	Peter Sowerby	Ferrari 360 Challenge	2004 Donington Ferrari Challenge UK round
Group A	1:14.200	Andy Rouse	Ford Sierra RS500 Cosworth	1988 2nd Donington BTCC round
Group 2	1:20.530	Lella Lombardi	Chevrolet Camaro	1981 Donington ETCC round
Grand Prix Circuit (1937–1939): 5.029 km (3.125 mi)
Grand Prix	2:11.400	Bernd Rosemeyer (Note: Both drivers took the same lap time independently.); Manfred von Brauchitsch	Auto Union Type C Mercedes-Benz W125	1937 Donington Grand Prix
Formula Libre	2:24.000	Tony Rolt	ERA B	1939 British Empire Trophy
Grand Prix Circuit (1935–1936): 4.107 km (2.552 mi)
Grand Prix	2:08.400	Giuseppe Farina	Maserati V8RI	1935 Donington Grand Prix
Grand Prix Circuit (1931–1934): 3.518 km (2.186 mi)
Grand Prix	2:06.000	Earl Howe	Bugatti Type 51	1933 Donington Park Trophy

== Events ==
Current

- April: British Touring Car Championship, F4 British Championship, Porsche Carrera Cup Great Britain, Ginetta Junior Championship
- May: British Superbike Championship, British Supersport Championship, Moto4 British Cup, Donington Historic Festival
- July: Superbike World Championship, Supersport World Championship, FIM Women's Motorcycling World Championship
- August: Britcar Convoy In The Park, British Touring Car Championship, F4 British Championship, Porsche Carrera Cup Great Britain, TCR UK Touring Car Championship
- September: British GT Championship, GB3 Championship, TCR UK Touring Car Championship, GB4 Championship, Ferrari Challenge UK, Ginetta Junior Championship
- October: British Superbike Championship, British Supersport Championship, Moto4 British Cup

Future

- Ferrari Challenge Europe (2004, 2027)
- Sportbike World Championship (2027)
- TCR Europe Touring Car Series (2027)

Former

- Auto GP (1999–2004, 2011, 2013)
- BPR Global GT Series (1995)
- BOSS GP (1995–2004, 2007–2008, 2011)
- Deutsche Tourenwagen Masters (2002–2003)
- Deutsche Tourenwagen Meisterschaft (1991, 1993–1995)
- EFDA Nations Cup (1996–1997)
- Eurocup Formula Renault 2.0 (1993, 2000, 2003–2007)
- Eurocup Mégane Trophy (2005–2007)
- European Formula Two Championship (1977–1979, 1981–1984)
- European Le Mans Series
  - 6 Hours of Donington (2006, 2012)
- European Touring Car Championship (1981–1988, 2002–2004)
- European Truck Racing Championship (1994, 1998–1999, 2011–2012)
- FIA European Formula 3 Championship (1977–1979, 1981–1984)
- FIA GT Championship (1997–1999, 2002–2004)
- FIA GT1 World Championship (2012)
- FIA Sportscar Championship
  - FIA Sportscar Championship Donington Park (1997–2001, 2003)
- FIA Touring Car World Cup (1994)
- FIM Endurance World Championship (1981–1982, 1987)
- Formula One
  - European Grand Prix (1993)
- Formula Palmer Audi (1998–2002, 2007–2008)
- Formula Renault 3.5 Series (2005–2007)
- Formula Renault V6 Eurocup (2003–2004)
- Grand Prix motorcycle racing
  - British motorcycle Grand Prix (1987–2009)
- IMSA European Le Mans Series (2001)
- International Formula 3000 (1985, 1987, 1990, 1993)
- International GTSprint Series (2013)
- Motocross of Nations (2008)
- Open Telefonica by Nissan (1998–2000)
- RAC Rally (1981–1998)
- Sidecar World Championship (1987–2001, 2008, 2014–2016, 2021–2022)
- Supersport 300 World Championship (2017–2019)
- Superstars Series (2011–2013)
- World Sportscar Championship
  - 500 km of Donington (1989–1990, 1992)
- World Touring Car Championship
  - FIA WTCC Race of UK (2011)

== Other events ==
Beside motorsports, many other events are held at Donington. The 1975 BMF Rally was held in the grounds with period reports of 10,000 motorcycle riders attending.

Other events included music festivals such as the Download Festival, and the Donington Grand Prix Museum exhibition until it closed down in November 2018. The Donington Park Sunday Market used to be held in the grounds of the park for nearly 40 years before being closed down in September 2016, the owners citing changing shopping habits contributing to fewer traders and customers.

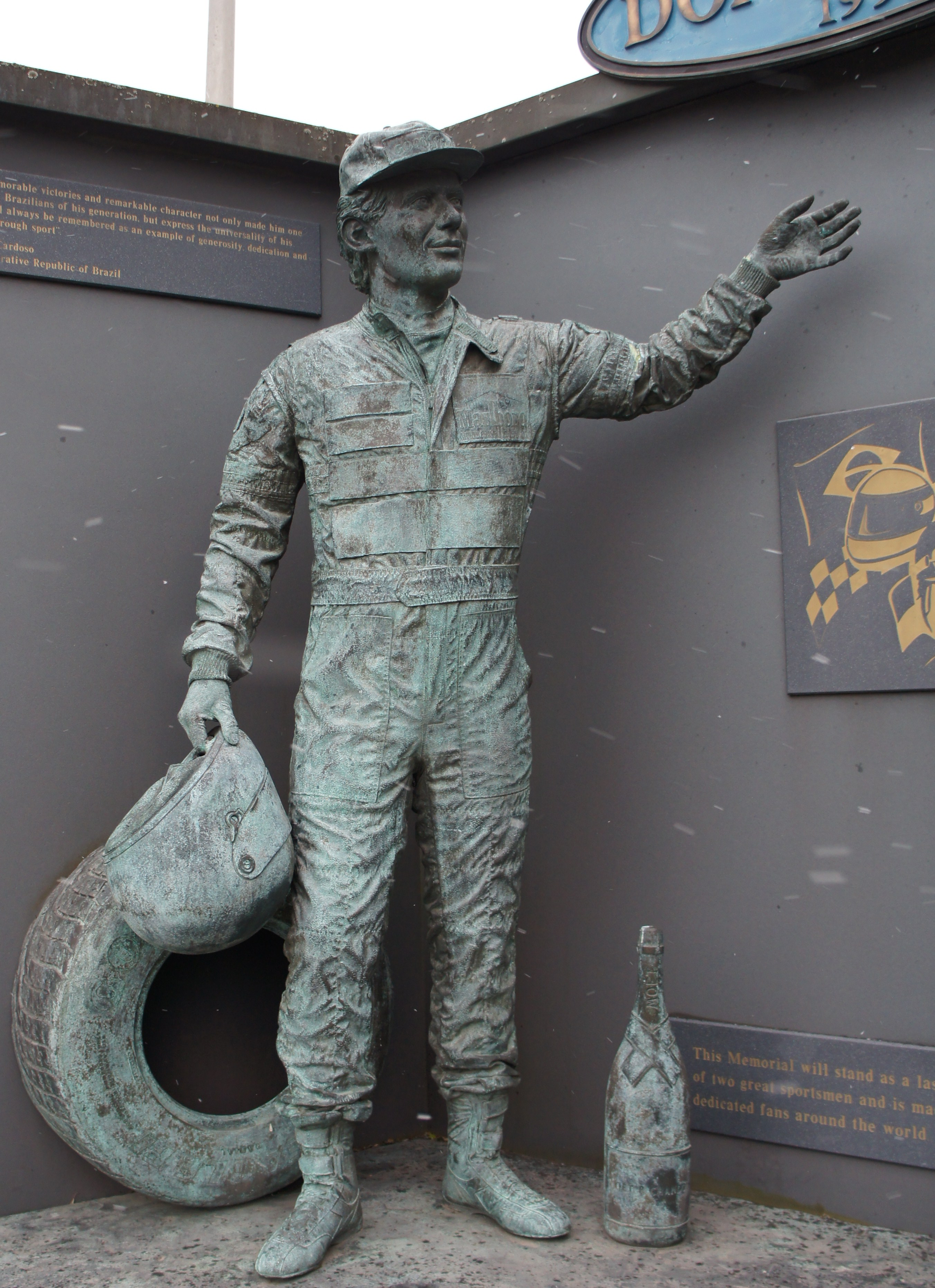
The Senna Memorial at Donington Park.

=== Music festivals ===
Donington Park has a long history of holding rock festivals having played host to the Monsters of Rock festival from 1980 to the mid 90s, when groups such as Van Halen, Bon Jovi, AC/DC, Metallica, and Iron Maiden performed there. With a few years off the park then played host to Stereophonics' A Day At The Races event and the Rock and Blues Festival in 2001, and the Ozzfest in 2002.

In 2003, the Download Festival (owned and operated by Live Nation) began annually at the venue and continues to an increased three-day event with five stages, though as of 2008 the event is now held outside of the track boundary.

Donington Park was the venue for the biggest rave to ever take place in the United Kingdom, when music promotor Fantazia held their 'One Step Beyond' event there in 1992. 25,000 tickets were sold, but police estimated that 3000 people had entered without tickets.

=== Donington Grand Prix Exhibition ===
The Donington Grand Prix Exhibition first opened to the public in March 1973. Five halls, with over 130 exhibits, illustrated the history of motor sport from the turn of the 20th century. Cars included examples driven by such famous names as Nuvolari, Mansell, Prost, Moss, Senna, Fangio, Clark and Stewart. The Donington Grand Prix Exhibition housed a collection of McLaren and Vanwalls racing cars. Notable exhibits included the 1936 twin engined 500 bhp (373 kW) Alfa Romeo Bimotore which had a top speed of 200 mph (320 km/h), Jim Clark's World Championship winning Lotus 25, the 'howling' flat 12 Ferrari 312B, and Stirling Moss's Lotus, in which he defeated the Ferrari works team in the 1961 Monaco Grand Prix. The Collection also featured the World's largest collection of Driver's Helmets. There were several different type of simulators that allowed users to experience the thrills of racing at speed.

After closing briefly in 2009 following the death of Tom Wheatcroft and Donington Ventures Leisure Ltd. entering administration, the exhibition reopened on 6 January 2010 along with the cafe and race control offices. With dwindling visitor numbers, and not being part of the core MSV business plan, the museum closed permanently on 5 November 2018.

== Location ==
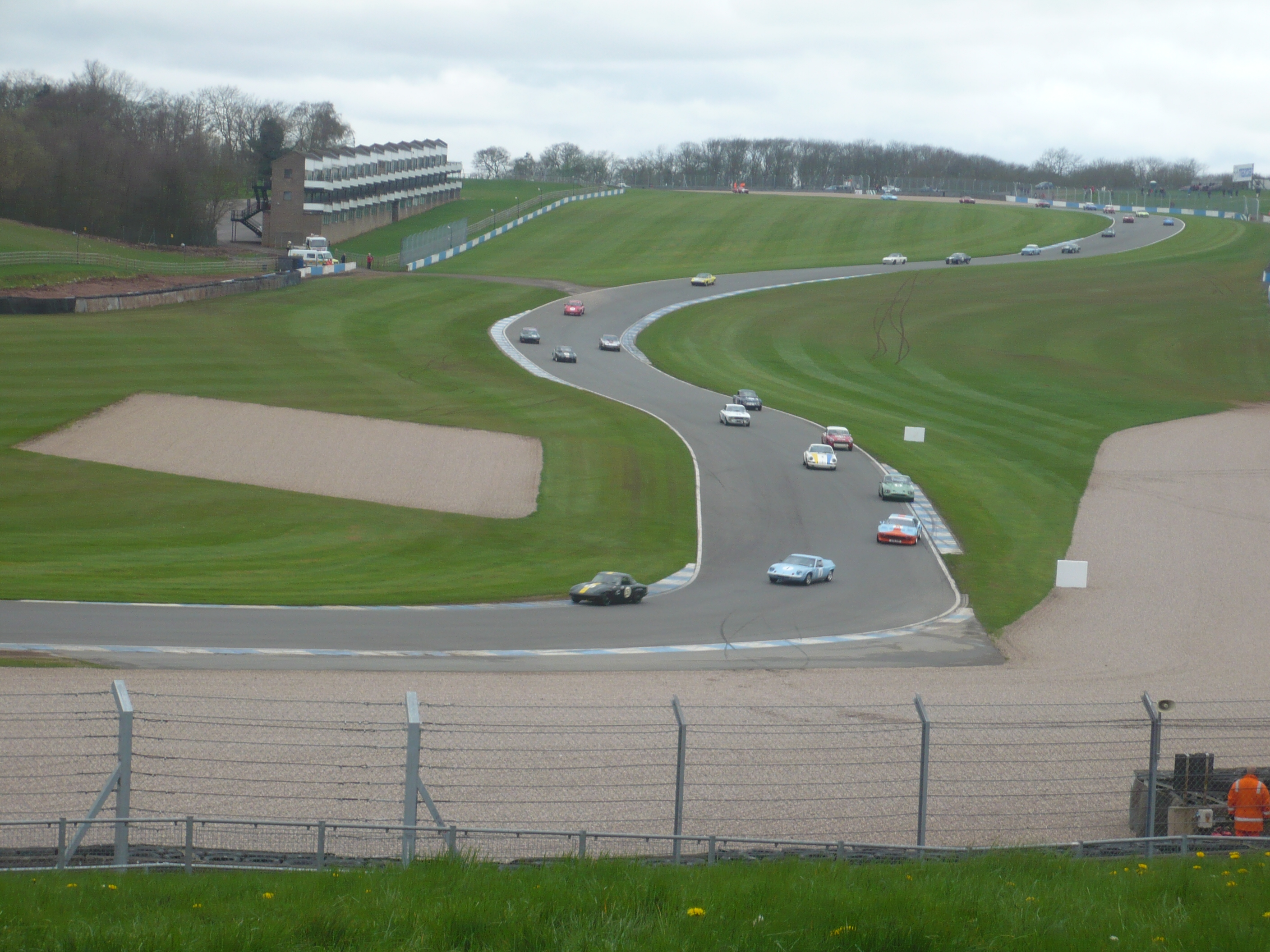
Historic cars race through the Craner Curves towards the Old Hairpin, 2014

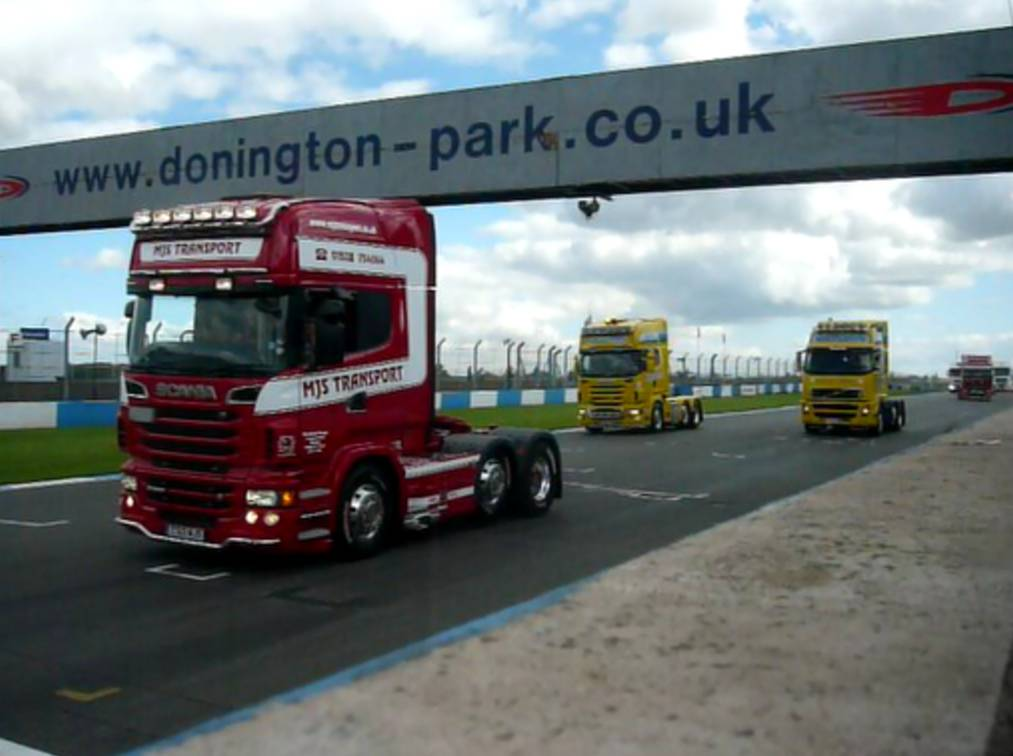
Parade trucks on the Wheatcroft Straight, 2013

Donington Park lies south west of Nottingham, south east of Derby and is situated in Leicestershire. It is a matter of a few yards/metres east of the border with Derbyshire and indeed has a Derby postcode and telephone code. The western end of the runway at East Midlands Airport is just 400 yards (365 meters) from the eastern end of the racing track. It is also fairly close to the M1.

East Midlands Parkway railway station and Derby Midland Station are close by and the owners have expressed their desire for spectators to use these stations and coaches to the circuit. The owners are also in support of any future light rail transport to East Midlands Airport itself.

Donington Hall was, for a time, the HQ of the airline British Midland International (later known as BMI).

== Media ==
Donington Park has been simulated and can be driven in several racing simulations, such as Spirit of Speed 1937 (the 1937 version of the track is featured, as the name suggests). Another 1937 layout features in the popular rFactor simulation. This version is far more accurate than that of the Spirit of Speed version. The track also features in Sports Car GT, Le Mans 24 Hours, ToCA Touring Car Championship, ToCA 2 Touring Cars, ToCA Race Driver, ToCA Race Driver 2, TOCA Race Driver 3, Alfa Romeo Racing Italiano, GTR, GTR2, GT Legends, F1 Challenge '99-'02 (with a mod), Grand Prix 4 (1993 configuration, unofficial add-on track), MotoGP 3, Redline, rFactor, SBK-07, Race Driver: GRID, Need for Speed: Shift, iRacing, Assetto Corsa (as a mod), Assetto Corsa Competizione (in British GT pack DLC), Automobilista 2, and Project CARS. Donington Park also appears as a venue in the game Guitar Hero: Metallica.

== Incidents ==
On 16 April 2017, British racing driver Billy Monger was critically injured after being involved in a racing car crash. His car slammed into a stationary car containing Patrik Pasma. Monger was conscious after the crash. Pasma was not seriously injured in the crash. Both drivers were sent directly to two hospitals. Both of Monger's legs were amputated afterwards in the hospital.

== See also ==
- Donington Grand Prix Collection
