= 2015 World Series by Renault =

Seasons
- ← 2014 2016 →

The 2015 World Series by Renault was the 11th season of Renault Sport's series of events, with three different championships racing under one banner. Consisting of the Formula Renault 3.5 Series, Eurocup Formula Renault 2.0 and Renault Sport Trophy, the World Series by Renault ran at seven different venues where fans could get into the meetings for no cost whatsoever, such is the uniqueness of the series. It was the first season with Renault Sport Trophy.

The series began on 25 April at the Ciudad del Motor de Aragón in Alcañiz, and finished on 18 October at the Circuito de Jerez, just outside Jerez de la Frontera. Round at Silverstone Circuit replaced Moscow Raceway round. Rounds at Circuit Paul Ricard was dropped. While Le Mans Bugatti returned to the series' schedule, while Formula Renault 3.5 Series had two extra races on its own, in support of the Monaco Grand Prix and Red Bull Ring European Le Mans Series round.

== Race calendar ==
- Event in light blue is not part of the World Series, but is a championship round for the Formula Renault 3.5 Series.

Circuit	Location	Date	Series	Winning driver	Winning team
(Spain) Ciudad del Motor de Aragón	Alcañiz, Spain	25 April	FR3.5 1	(United Kingdom) Oliver Rowland	(United Kingdom) Fortec Motorsports
(Spain) Ciudad del Motor de Aragón	Alcañiz, Spain	25 April	FR2.0 1	(Switzerland) Louis Delétraz	(Germany) Josef Kaufmann Racing
(Spain) Ciudad del Motor de Aragón	Alcañiz, Spain	26 April	FR3.5 2	(France) Matthieu Vaxivière	(Czech Republic) Lotus
(Spain) Ciudad del Motor de Aragón	Alcañiz, Spain	26 April	FR2.0 2	(Switzerland) Louis Delétraz	(Germany) Josef Kaufmann Racing
Circuit de Monaco	Monte Carlo, Monaco	24 May	FR3.5 3	(Malaysia) Jazeman Jaafar	(United Kingdom) Fortec Motorsports
(Belgium) Circuit de Spa-Francorchamps	Spa, Belgium	30 May	FR3.5 4	(France) Matthieu Vaxivière	(Czech Republic) Lotus
(Belgium) Circuit de Spa-Francorchamps	Spa, Belgium	30 May	FR2.0 3	(Japan) Ukyo Sasahara	(France) ART Junior Team
(Belgium) Circuit de Spa-Francorchamps	Spa, Belgium	30 May	RST 1	(Italy) David Fumanelli (Italy) Dario Capitanio	(Italy) Oregon Team
(Belgium) Circuit de Spa-Francorchamps	Spa, Belgium	31 May	FR3.5 5	(United Kingdom) Oliver Rowland	(United Kingdom) Fortec Motorsports
(Belgium) Circuit de Spa-Francorchamps	Spa, Belgium	31 May	FR2.0 4	(United Kingdom) Jake Hughes	(Finland) Koiranen GP
(Belgium) Circuit de Spa-Francorchamps	Spa, Belgium	31 May	RST 2	(Netherlands) Diederik Sijthoff	(Netherlands) V8 Racing
(Belgium) Circuit de Spa-Francorchamps	Spa, Belgium	31 May	RST 3	(Netherlands) Steijn Schothorst	(Netherlands) Equipe Verschuur
(Hungary) Hungaroring	Mogyoród, Hungary	13 June	FR3.5 6	(Russia) Egor Orudzhev	(United Kingdom) Arden Motorsport
(Hungary) Hungaroring	Mogyoród, Hungary	13 June	FR2.0 5	(United Kingdom) Jack Aitken	(Finland) Koiranen GP
(Hungary) Hungaroring	Mogyoród, Hungary	13 June	RST 4	(Belgium) Wolfgang Reip (Spain) David Cebrián	(Spain) Monlau Competición
(Hungary) Hungaroring	Mogyoród, Hungary	14 June	FR3.5 7	(United Kingdom) Oliver Rowland	(United Kingdom) Fortec Motorsports
(Hungary) Hungaroring	Mogyoród, Hungary	14 June	FR2.0 6	(Switzerland) Louis Delétraz	(Germany) Josef Kaufmann Racing
(Hungary) Hungaroring	Mogyoród, Hungary	14 June	RST 5	(Slovakia) Richard Gonda	(France) ART Junior Team
(Hungary) Hungaroring	Mogyoród, Hungary	14 June	RST 6	(Netherlands) Steijn Schothorst	(Netherlands) Equipe Verschuur
(Austria) Red Bull Ring	Spielberg, Austria	12 July	FR3.5 8	(United Kingdom) Oliver Rowland	(United Kingdom) Fortec Motorsports
(Austria) Red Bull Ring	Spielberg, Austria	12 July	FR3.5 9	(France) Matthieu Vaxivière	(Czech Republic) Lotus
(United Kingdom) Silverstone Circuit	Silverstone, United Kingdom	5 September	FR3.5 10	(Cyprus) Tio Ellinas	(United Kingdom) Strakka Racing
(United Kingdom) Silverstone Circuit	Silverstone, United Kingdom	5 September	FR2.0 7	(United Kingdom) Jack Aitken	(Finland) Koiranen GP
(United Kingdom) Silverstone Circuit	Silverstone, United Kingdom	5 September	FR2.0 8	(Switzerland) Kevin Jörg	(Germany) Josef Kaufmann Racing
(United Kingdom) Silverstone Circuit	Silverstone, United Kingdom	5 September	RST 7	(United Kingdom) Luciano Bacheta (Italy) Niccolò Nalio	(Italy) Oregon Team
(United Kingdom) Silverstone Circuit	Silverstone, United Kingdom	6 September	FR3.5 11	(United Kingdom) Oliver Rowland	(United Kingdom) Fortec Motorsports
(United Kingdom) Silverstone Circuit	Silverstone, United Kingdom	6 September	FR2.0 9	(France) Anthoine Hubert	(France) Tech 1 Racing
(United Kingdom) Silverstone Circuit	Silverstone, United Kingdom	6 September	RST 8	(Italy) Niccolò Nalio	(Italy) Oregon Team
(United Kingdom) Silverstone Circuit	Silverstone, United Kingdom	6 September	RST 9	(Netherlands) Pieter Schothorst	(Netherlands) Equipe Verschuur
(Germany) Nürburgring	Nürburg, Germany	12 September	FR3.5 12	(United Kingdom) Oliver Rowland	(United Kingdom) Fortec Motorsports
(Germany) Nürburgring	Nürburg, Germany	12 September	FR2.0 10	(United Kingdom) Jack Aitken	(Finland) Koiranen GP
(Germany) Nürburgring	Nürburg, Germany	12 September	RST 10	(Netherlands) Roy Geerts (Netherlands) Max Braams	(Netherlands) V8 Racing
(Germany) Nürburgring	Nürburg, Germany	13 September	FR3.5 13	(Cyprus) Tio Ellinas	(United Kingdom) Strakka Racing
(Germany) Nürburgring	Nürburg, Germany	13 September	FR2.0 11	(United Kingdom) Ben Barnicoat	(United Kingdom) Fortec Motorsports
(Germany) Nürburgring	Nürburg, Germany	13 September	RST 11	(Italy) Dario Capitanio	(Italy) Oregon Team
(Germany) Nürburgring	Nürburg, Germany	13 September	RST 12	(France) Andrea Pizzitola	(France) ART Junior Team
(France) Le Mans Bugatti	Le Mans, France	26 September	FR3.5 14	(United Kingdom) Oliver Rowland	(United Kingdom) Fortec Motorsports
(France) Le Mans Bugatti	Le Mans, France	26 September	FR2.0 12	(United Kingdom) Ben Barnicoat	(United Kingdom) Fortec Motorsports
(France) Le Mans Bugatti	Le Mans, France	26 September	RST 13	(France) Andrea Pizzitola (Slovakia) Richard Gonda	(France) ART Junior Team
(France) Le Mans Bugatti	Le Mans, France	28 September	FR3.5 15	(Russia) Egor Orudzhev	(United Kingdom) Arden Motorsport
(France) Le Mans Bugatti	Le Mans, France	28 September	FR2.0 13	(France) Anthoine Hubert	(France) Tech 1 Racing
(France) Le Mans Bugatti	Le Mans, France	28 September	RST 14	(Italy) Dario Capitanio	(Italy) Oregon Team
(France) Le Mans Bugatti	Le Mans, France	28 September	RST 15	(Italy) David Fumanelli	(Italy) Oregon Team
(Spain) Circuito de Jerez	Jerez de la Frontera, Spain	17 October	FR3.5 16	(United Kingdom) Oliver Rowland	(United Kingdom) Fortec Motorsports
(Spain) Circuito de Jerez	Jerez de la Frontera, Spain	17 October	FR2.0 14	(United Kingdom) Jack Aitken	(Finland) Koiranen GP
(Spain) Circuito de Jerez	Jerez de la Frontera, Spain	17 October	FR2.0 15	(United Kingdom) Jack Aitken	(Finland) Koiranen GP
(Spain) Circuito de Jerez	Jerez de la Frontera, Spain	17 October	RST 16	(France) Andrea Pizzitola (Slovakia) Richard Gonda	(France) ART Junior Team
(Spain) Circuito de Jerez	Jerez de la Frontera, Spain	18 October	FR3.5 17	(Netherlands) Nyck de Vries	(France) DAMS
(Spain) Circuito de Jerez	Jerez de la Frontera, Spain	18 October	FR2.0 16	(United Kingdom) Ben Barnicoat	(United Kingdom) Fortec Motorsports
(Spain) Circuito de Jerez	Jerez de la Frontera, Spain	18 October	RST 17	(Italy) Dario Capitanio	(Italy) Oregon Team
(Spain) Circuito de Jerez	Jerez de la Frontera, Spain	18 October	RST 18	(Netherlands) Indy Dontje	(France) ART Junior Team

Icon	Championship
FR3.5	Formula Renault 3.5 Series
FR2.0	Eurocup Formula Renault 2.0
RST	Renault Sport Trophy

== Championships ==
=== Formula Renault 3.5 Series ===
Pos.	Driver	Team	Points
1	(United Kingdom) Oliver Rowland	(United Kingdom) Fortec Motorsports	307
2	(France) Matthieu Vaxivière	(Czech Republic) Lotus	234
3	(Netherlands) Nyck de Vries	(France) DAMS	160
4	(Cyprus) Tio Ellinas	(United Kingdom) Strakka Racing	135
5	(Russia) Egor Orudzhev	(United Kingdom) Arden Motorsport	133

=== Eurocup Formula Renault 2.0 ===
Pos.	Driver	Team	Points
1	(United Kingdom) Jack Aitken	(Finland) Koiranen GP	206
2	(Switzerland) Louis Delétraz	(Germany) Josef Kaufmann Racing	193
3	(Switzerland) Kevin Jörg	(Germany) Josef Kaufmann Racing	193
4	(United Kingdom) Ben Barnicoat	(United Kingdom) Fortec Motorsports	174
5	(France) Anthoine Hubert	(France) Tech 1 Racing	172

=== Renault Sport Trophy ===
==== Endurance ====
Pos.	Driver	Team	Points
1	(Italy) David Fumanelli (Italy) Dario Capitanio	(Italy) Oregon Team	115
2	(France) Andrea Pizzitola (Slovakia) Richard Gonda	(France) ART Junior Team	95
3	(United Kingdom) Luciano Bacheta (Italy) Niccolò Nalio	(Italy) Oregon Team	72
4	(Netherlands) Max Braams	(Netherlands) V8 Racing	55
5	(Netherlands) Roy Geerts	(Netherlands) V8 Racing	49

==== Elite ====
Pos.	Driver	Team	Points
1	(France) Andrea Pizzitola	(France) ART Junior Team	140
2	(Netherlands) Steijn Schothorst	(Netherlands) Equipe Verschuur	138
3	(Italy) David Fumanelli	(Italy) Oregon Team	103
4	(Netherlands) Indy Dontje	(France) ART Junior Team	96
5	(United Kingdom) Luciano Bacheta	(Italy) Oregon Team	62

==== Prestige ====
Pos.	Driver	Team	Points
1	(Italy) Dario Capitanio	(Italy) Oregon Team	162
2	(Slovakia) Richard Gonda	(France) ART Junior Team	123
3	(Netherlands) Diederik Sijthoff	(Netherlands) V8 Racing	109
4	(Italy) Niccolò Nalio	(Italy) Oregon Team	103
5	(Netherlands) Max Braams	(Netherlands) V8 Racing	101
