= FIA Formula Two Championship (disambiguation) =

FIA Formula Two Championship is the name of:

- FIA Formula Two Championship (established in 2009), a one-make class of auto racing for Formula Two open wheeled single seater racing cars, where all cars were serviced by Motorsport Vision.
- FIA Formula 2 Championship, a one-make class of auto racing for Formula 2 open wheeled single seater racing cars, where cars are serviced by different teams. Successor of the GP2 Series (2005-2016) which was established in 2017.
