= 2006 Ginetta Junior Championship =

Seasons
- ← 2005 2007 →

The 2006 Ginetta Junior Championship was the second season of the Ginetta Junior Championship, a multi-event, one make motor racing championship held across England, Wales and France. The championship had drivers enter as privateers, and all teama dn drivers were British-registered, competing in Ginetta G20 GT4 CoupéS. The season began at Snetterton on 1 April and concluded after 14 races over 7 events at Thruxton on 1 October.

== Teams and drivers ==
No.	Drivers	Rounds
2	Steve Taddei	1
2	Graham Carroll	2-7
3	Liam McMillan	5
4	Robert Gaffney	All
5	James Harrison	All
7	Henry Surtees	All
8	James Jefferson	All
9	Jade Edwards	2-7
10	Tom Sharp	All
11	Jordan Williams	All
19	Ashley Bird	All
20	Cassey Watson	4
20	Nick Ponting	5
20	Daniel Laddiman	6-7
28	George Richardson	4-7
34	Christopher Clayton	2-3, 5-7
40	Ross Everill	2-3
40	Luciano Bacheta	4
44	Michal Rzadkiewicz	1-5, 7
51	Stephen Russell	5-7
57	Phillip Russell	5-7
66	Dominic Pettit	All
91	Fergus Walkinshaw	1-3, 5-7

== Race calendar and results ==
Round		Circuit	Date	Pole position	Fastest lap	Winning driver
1	R1	(United Kingdom) Snetterton Motor Racing Circuit, Norfolk †	2 April	Henry Surtees	Henry Surtees	Henry Surtees
1	R2	(United Kingdom) Snetterton Motor Racing Circuit, Norfolk †	2 April	Henry Surtees	Henry Surtees	Robert Gaffney
2	R3	(United Kingdom) Pembrey, Wales	28 May	Robert Gaffney	Henry Surtees	Henry Surtees
2	R4	(United Kingdom) Pembrey, Wales	28 May	Robert Gaffney	Jordan Williams	Henry Surtees
3	R5	Croix en Ternois, France	1 July	Graham Carroll	Graham Carroll	Graham Carroll
3	R6	Croix en Ternois, France	2 July	Graham Carroll	Henry Surtees	James Harrison
4	R7	(United Kingdom) Silverstone (National), Northamptonshire	23 July	Jordan Williams	James Harrison	James Harrison
4	R8	(United Kingdom) Silverstone (National), Northamptonshire	23 July	Jordan Williams	Jordan Williams	Jordan Williams
5	R9	(United Kingdom) Brands Hatch (Indy), Kent	19 August	Jordan Williams	Jordan Williams	James Harrison
5	R10	(United Kingdom) Brands Hatch (Indy), Kent	20 August	James Harrison	Jordan Williams	Henry Surtees
6	R11	(United Kingdom) Croft Circuit, North Yorkshire	10 September	Jordan Williams	Jordan Williams	James Harrison
6	R12	(United Kingdom) Croft Circuit, North Yorkshire	10 September	Jordan Williams	Jordan Williams	Jordan Williams
7	R13	(United Kingdom) Thruxton Circuit, Hampshire	30 September	Jordan Williams	Jordan Williams	Jordan Williams
7	R14	(United Kingdom) Thruxton Circuit, Hampshire	1 October	Jordan Williams	Henry Surtees	Jordan Williams

† Non championship round

== Drivers' Championship ==
Pos	Driver	SNE† (United Kingdom)		PEM (United Kingdom)		CRX (France)		SIL (United Kingdom)		BRH (United Kingdom)		CRO (United Kingdom)		THR (United Kingdom)		Pts
1	James Harrison	2	4	2	2	2	1	1	2	1	3	1	4	2	10	304
2	Jordan Williams	3	Ret	3	3	3	2	2	1	6	2	Ret	1	1	1	294
3	Henry Surtees	1	2	1	1	4	3	4	6	2	1	13	14	Ret	3	236
4	Robert Gaffney	4	1	Ret	5	5	5	5	4	4	5	2	2	4	4	228
5	Graham Carroll			4	4	1	Ret	DNS	DNS	3	4	6	3	5	2	199
6	Dominic Pettit	9	6	5	7	Ret	4	10	5	NC^{1}	Ret	4	7	3	5	160
7	Tom Sharp	5	3	Ret	6	7	9	8	8	5	6	7	10	Ret	6	144
8	James Jefferson	7	Ret	6	Ret	DNS	DNS	6	7	9	8	3	9	8	DNS	120
9	Jade Edwards			12	10	Ret	11	12	10	13	10	8	6	7	9	119
10	Ashley Bird	10	8	9	Ret	9	8	11	11	10	9	9	12	11	11	109
11	Fergus Walkinshaw	11	Ret	8	Ret	Ret	7			7	7	10	8	6	8	108
12	Christopher Clayton			11	9	10	12			12	14	11	11	10	14	81
13	Michal Rzadkiewicz	6	7	7	Ret	6	6	7	Ret	Ret	11			9	DNS	80
14	George Richardson							Ret	12	11	13	12	13	12	12	55
15	Ross Everill			10	8	8	10									42
16	Phillip Russell										15		15	13		18
17	Stephen Russell									14		14			13	17
guest drivers ineligible for points
-	Luciano Bacheta							3	3							0
-	Daniel Laddiman											5	5	Ret	7	0
-	Steve Taddei	8	5													0
-	Nick Ponting									8	12					0
-	Cassey Watson							9	9							0
-	Liam McMillan									Ret	DNS					0
Pos	Driver	SNE† (United Kingdom)		PEM (United Kingdom)		CRX (France)		SIL (United Kingdom)		BRH (United Kingdom)		CRO (United Kingdom)		THR (United Kingdom)		Pts

Colour	Result
Gold	Winner
Silver	Second place
Bronze	Third place
Green	Points classification
Blue	Non-points classification
Blue	Non-classified finish (NC)
Purple	Retired, not classified (Ret)
Red	Did not qualify (DNQ)
Red	Did not pre-qualify (DNPQ)
Black	Disqualified (DSQ)
White	Did not start (DNS)
White	Withdrew (WD)
White	Race cancelled (C)
Blank	Did not practice (DNP)
Blank	Did not arrive (DNA)
Blank	Excluded (EX)

1. – Dominic Pettit was not classified for not running at the red flag.

† Non championship round
