= Luciano Bacheta =

British stunt and racing driver (born 1990)

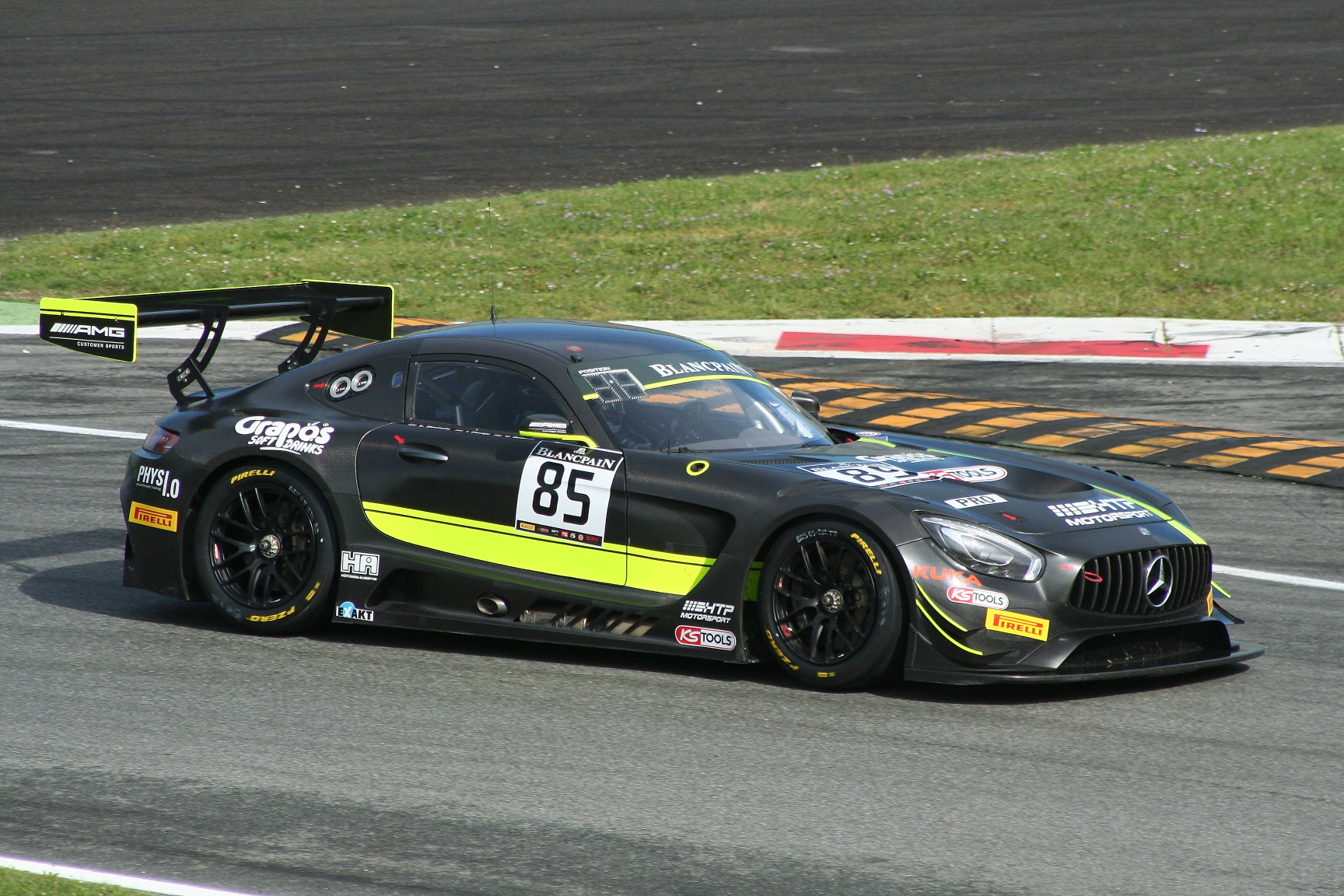
- Bacheta at Monza in 2016
- Born: Akshay Luciano Bacheta; 26 April 1990 (age 36); Romford, London, England
- Occupations: Racing driver; Stunt driver
- Nationality: (United Kingdom) British

FIA Formula Two Championship career
- Categorisation: FIA Gold (until 2018); FIA Silver (2019–)
- Years active: 2011–2012
- Teams: MotorSport Vision
- Starts: 24
- Championships: 1 (2012)
- Wins: 5
- Podiums: 8
- Poles: 3
- Fastest laps: 5

Previous series
- 2016; 2015; 2014; 2013; 2011–2012; 2011; 2008–2010; 2008–2009; 2007; 2006–2007; 2006; 2006: Blancpain GT Series; Renault Sport Trophy; ELMS; Auto GP; FIA Formula Two; GP3 Series; Formula Renault Eurocup; Formula Renault 2.0 WEC; Formula Palmer Audi; FPA Autumn Trophy; T Cars; Ginetta Junior

Championship titles
- 2012 2006: FIA Formula Two Championship; T Cars

Awards
- 2010: BRDC Rising Star

Akshay Luciano Bacheta (/ˈækʃeɪ luˈtʃɑːnoʊ bæˈtʃɛtə/; born 26 April 1990) is a British stunt driver and former racing driver who competed in the FIA Formula Two Championship from 2011 to 2012.

Born in Romford to Indian parents, Bacheta began competitive kart racing aged 14. He debuted in the 2006 Ginetta Junior Championship, winning the T Cars title that year. After finishing runner-up to Kevin Korjus in the 2010 Eurocup Formula Renault 2.0, he competed in FIA Formula Two from 2011 to 2012, winning the latter title with MotorSport Vision. After testing the FW33 with Williams, he then became a race-winner in the 2013 Auto GP Series. After three seasons in sportscar racing, he retired in 2016 to move into stunt driving.

Bacheta made his feature film debut with his stunt work in the Mission: Impossible film Rogue Nation (2015)—he has since worked on Fallout (2018) and Dead Reckoning (2023). He has further performed for The Mummy (2017), Transformers: The Last Knight (2017), Spider-Man: Far From Home (2019), and Indiana Jones and the Dial of Destiny (2023). He choreographed the racing sequences in F1 (2025), which received widespread acclaim, and made his acting debut as reserve driver Luca Cortez.

== Early life ==
Akshay Luciano Bacheta was born on 26 April 1990 in Romford, London, England. His parents are Indian.

== Junior racing career ==
=== Karting and lower formulae (2004–2007) ===
Bacheta started karting at the age of fourteen in 2004 and stepped up to cars in 2005, racing in the Junior Ginetta series, recording six wins and the most fastest laps and pole positions. In 2006, Bacheta won the T Cars Championship after scoring six consecutive victories mid-season, and edged out Max Chilton by three points. In the off-season, Bacheta moved into open-wheel racing, competing in the Formula Palmer Audi Autumn Trophy. At Snetterton, Bacheta won his very first race in a single-seater car, and went on to finish the Autumn Trophy in third place after problems at round two.

Bacheta committed to racing a full campaign in Formula Palmer Audi for the 2007 season, and finished third overall in the championship standings with three poles and four wins. He competed in the Autumn Trophy again at the completion of the season, but could only finish a lowly fourteenth in the standings.

=== Formula Renault 2.0 (2008–2010) ===
==== 2008: Debut in the Eurocup and WEC with Hitech ====
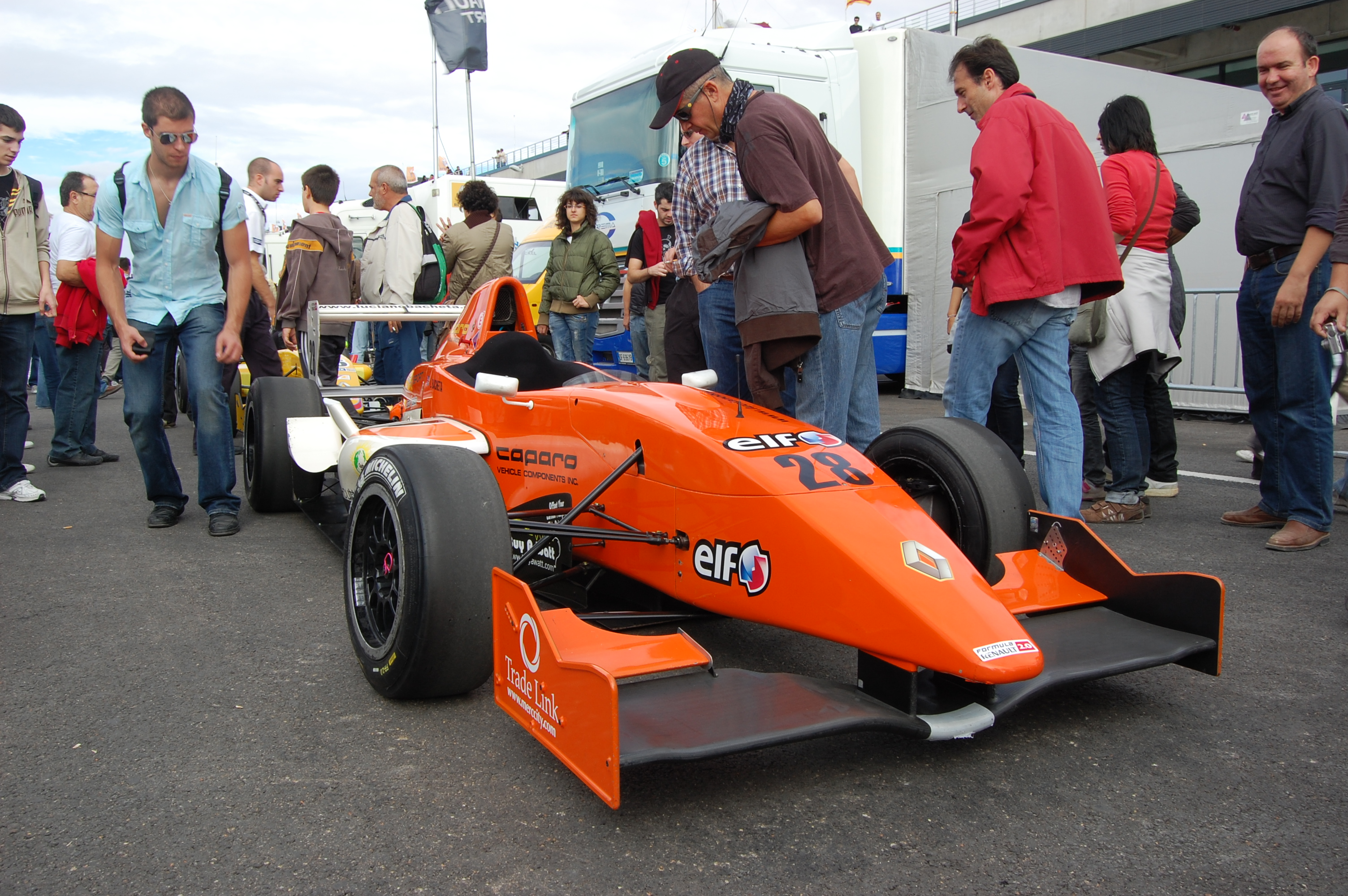
Luciano Bacheta's Eurocup Formula Renault 2.0 car at Ciudad del Motor de Aragón in 2009.

Bacheta moved into Formula Renault in 2008, moving into both the Eurocup and the West European Cup, driving for the Hitech Junior Team. Bacheta made six starts in the WEC, recording a best finish of ninth at Magny-Cours with left him 26th in the championship. He fared three places better in the pan-European series, amassing three points from an eighth-place finish at Le Mans.

==== 2009: Several points finishes with Epsilon ====
Bacheta moved to Epsilon Sport for the 2009 campaigns, but put his main emphasis into the Eurocup, with just one appearance in the WEC – finishing fifth and sixth – at the World Touring Car Championship-supporting round in Pau. In the Eurocup, Bacheta finished in the points three times, en route to sixteenth in the championship, despite missing the rounds in Hungary with budgetary problems.

==== 2010: Runner-up in the Eurocup ====
Bacheta returned to the Eurocup in 2010, with the new Interwetten Junior Team, finishing as vice-champion to Kevin Korjus. He was also awarded BRDC Rising Star status and nominated for the McLaren Autosport BRDC Award.

=== GP3 Series (2011) ===
Bacheta graduated to the GP3 Series in 2011 with Mücke. He scored his sole points finish at the Silverstone feature race, finishing fifth in race one after starting twenty-third. He departed the series after the Budapest round.

=== FIA Formula Two (2011–2012) ===
==== 2011: Points on debut ====
Bacheta debuted in FIA Formula Two in 2011 at the Red Bull Ring, where he finished seventh and tenth. He returned at Monza, claiming two further points finishes in tenth and fifth.

==== 2012: F2 Champion ====
Bacheta earned a full-time drive in F2 for his 2012 campaign. He dominated the opening two rounds, winning all four races at Silverstone and Portimão. Following another podium at the Nürburgring, he won the second race at Spa-Francorchamps from pole position. He took podiums in each of the four remaining rounds—Brands Hatch, Paul Ricard, Hungaroring, and Monza—as he claimed the title by 21.5 points over Mathéo Tuscher, and 35.5 points over Christopher Zanella.

=== Auto GP (2013) ===
Following his F2 title, Bacheta signed for Zele Racing in the 2013 Auto GP Series. He took a podium in his debut weekend at Monza before achieving his maiden victory at Marrakech. Points finishes followed at the Hungaroring and Silverstone, but he departed halfway through the season, ending eleventh overall in the standings.

== Sportscar racing career ==
=== European Le Mans Series (2014) ===
Bacheta debuted in sportscar racing in the LMP2 class of the European Le Mans Series in 2014 with Greaves, driving the No. 28 Zytek Z11SN alongside Mark Shulzhitskiy. He finished fourth on debut at the Red Bull Ring. He closed the season with fifth and a retirement at Paul Ricard and Estoril, respectively.

=== Renault Sport Trophy (2015) ===
Bacheta moved to the Renault Sport Trophy in 2015 with Oregon, finishing fifth overall and third in the Endurance Trophy, the latter alongside amateur driver Niccolò Nalio.

=== Blancpain GT Series (2016) ===
Bacheta joined HTP in the Blancpain GT Series in 2016, contesting five rounds of the Endurance Cup in the No. 85 Mercedes-AMG GT3 alongside Indy Dontje and Clemens Schmid. They claimed their sole points finish at the 3 Hours of Silverstone, where they finished fifth. At the age of 26, Bacheta retired from motor racing at the end of the season to move into stunt driving.

=== 750 Motor Club (2019) ===
After three years away from competing, Bacheta returned to racing at the 750MC Birkett 6 Hour Relay in 2019 and won aboard a Radical SR3, with team-mates Wade Eastwood and Charles Graham.

== Film career ==
After his racing career ended, Bacheta became a film stunt driver. In 2025, he appeared as APXGP reserve driver Luca Cortez as a non-speaking role in F1, where he was also the driving sequences choreographer.

=== Filmography ===
Year	Title	Credits	Notes
2015	Mission: Impossible – Rogue Nation	Stunt driver and cascades	
2017	The Mummy	Stunt performer	
2017	Transformers: The Last Knight	Stunt driver	Uncredited
2018	Mission: Impossible – Fallout	Stunt driver	Uncredited
2019	Men in Black: International	Stunt driver	Uncredited
2019	Spider-Man: Far From Home	Stunt double for Samuel L. Jackson	Uncredited
2019	Departure	Stunt performer	TV series
2023	Indiana Jones and the Dial of Destiny	Stunt performer	
2023	Mission: Impossible – Dead Reckoning Part One	Stunts	
2024	The Union	Stunt driver	
2025	F1	Lead sequence choreographer	Appears as Luca Cortez

== Racing record ==
=== Racing career summary ===
Season	Series	Team	Races	Wins	Poles	F/Laps	Podiums	Points	Position
2006	T Cars	PalmerSport Junior	20	6	3	5	11	170	**1st**
2006	Formula Palmer Audi Autumn Trophy	—N/a	6	2	1	?	3	102	**3rd**
2006	Ginetta Junior Championship	—N/a	2	0	0	0	2	—N/a	NC†
2007	Formula Palmer Audi	—N/a	20	4	2	?	9	303	**3rd**
2007	Formula Palmer Audi Autumn Trophy	—N/a	3	0	0	0	0	37	14th
2008	Eurocup Formula Renault 2.0	Hitech Junior Team	14	0	0	0	0	3	23rd
2008	Formula Renault 2.0 WEC	Hitech Junior Team	6	0	0	0	0	2	26th
2009	Eurocup Formula Renault 2.0	Epsilon Sport	12	0	0	0	0	11	16th
2009	Formula Renault 2.0 WEC	Epsilon Sport	2	0	0	0	0	11	13th
2010	Eurocup Formula Renault 2.0	Interwetten Junior Team	16	1	0	2	6	124	**2nd**
2010	Formula BMW Europe	DAMS	4	0	0	0	0	—N/a	NC†
2010	Formula Renault 2.0 NEC	Interwetten Junior Team	2	0	0	0	0	1	32nd
2010	Formula Renault UK	Team Firstair	2	0	0	0	0	14	25th
2011	GP3 Series	RSC Mücke Motorsport	12	0	0	0	0	4	22nd
2011	FIA Formula Two Championship	MotorSport Vision	4	0	0	0	0	18	13th
2012	FIA Formula Two Championship	MotorSport Vision	20	5	3	5	8	231.5	**1st**
2013	Auto GP	Zele Racing	8	1	0	0	2	49	11th
2014	European Le Mans Series - LMP2	Greaves Motorsport	3	0	0	0	0	22	13th
2015	Renault Sport Trophy - Elite Class	Oregon Team	9	0	0	0	0	62	5th
2015	Renault Sport Endurance Trophy	Oregon Team	6	1	1	0	3	72	**3rd**
2016	Blancpain GT Series Endurance Cup	HTP Motorsport	5	0	0	0	0	10	34th

^{†} As Bacheta was a guest driver, he was ineligible for championship points.

=== Complete Eurocup Formula Renault 2.0 results ===
(key) (Races in bold indicate pole position; races in italics indicate fastest lap)

Year	Entrant	1	2	3	4	5	6	7	8	9	10	11	12	13	14	15	16	DC	Points
2008	Hitech Junior Team	SPA; 1; 15	SPA; 2; 18	SIL; 1; 35	SIL; 2; 36	HUN; 1; 31†	HUN; 2 Ret	NÜR; 1; 17	NÜR; 2 Ret	LMS; 1; 8	LMS; 2; 11	EST; 1 Ret	EST; 2 NC	CAT; 1 Ret	CAT; 2; 18			23rd	3
2009	Epsilon Sport	CAT; 1; 6	CAT; 2 Ret	SPA; 1; 15	SPA; 2; 12	HUN; 1	HUN; 2	SIL; 1; 16	SIL; 2; 14	LMS; 1; 12	LMS; 2; 13	NÜR; 1; 7	NÜR; 2; 12	ALC; 1; 10	ALC; 2; 17			16th	11
2010	Interwetten Junior Team	ALC; 1; 3	ALC; 2; 4	SPA; 1; 5	SPA; 2; 4	BRN; 1; 3	BRN; 2; 3	MAG; 1 Ret	MAG; 2; 2	HUN; 1; 18	HUN; 2; 1	HOC; 1; 13	HOC; 2; 5	SIL; 1; 4	SIL; 2; 2	CAT; 1; 9	CAT; 2; 6	2nd	124

=== Complete Formula Renault 2.0 NEC results ===
(key) (Races in bold indicate pole position) (Races in italics indicate fastest lap)

Year	Entrant	1	2	3	4	5	6	7	8	9	10	11	12	13	14	15	16	17	18	19	20	DC	Points
2010	Interwetten Junior Team	HOC; 1	HOC; 2	BRN; 1 Ret	BRN; 2; 26	ZAN; 1	ZAN; 2	OSC; 1	OSC; 2	OSC; 3	ASS; 1	ASS; 2	MST; 1	MST; 2	MST; 3	SPA; 1	SPA; 2	SPA; 3	NÜR; 1	NÜR; 2	NÜR; 3	32nd	1

=== Complete GP3 Series results ===
(key) (Races in bold indicate pole position) (Races in italics indicate fastest lap)

Year	Entrant	1	2	3	4	5	6	7	8	9	10	11	12	13	14	15	16	DC	Points
2011	RSC Mücke Motorsport	IST; FEA; Ret	IST; SPR; 19	CAT; FEA; 22	CAT; SPR; 16	VAL; FEA; 18	VAL; SPR; 10	SIL; FEA; 5	SIL; SPR; 19	NÜR; FEA; 25	NÜR; SPR; 25	HUN; FEA; 17	HUN; SPR; Ret	SPA; FEA	SPA; SPR	MNZ; FEA	MNZ; SPR	22nd	4

=== Complete FIA Formula Two Championship results ===
(key) (Races in bold indicate pole position) (Races in italics indicate fastest lap)

Year	1	2	3	4	5	6	7	8	9	10	11	12	13	14	15	16	Pos	Points
2011	SIL; 1	SIL; 2	MAG; 1	MAG; 2	SPA; 1	SPA; 2	NÜR; 1	NÜR; 2	BRH; 1	BRH; 2	RBR; 1; 7	RBR; 2; 10	MNZ; 1; 10	MNZ; 2; 5	CAT; 1	CAT; 2	13th	18
2012	SIL; 1; 1	SIL; 2; 1	**ALG**; **1**; 1	ALG; 2; 1	NÜR; 1; 2	NÜR; 2; 6	SPA; 1 Ret	**SPA**; **2**; 1	**BRH**; **1**; 3	BRH; 2; 6	LEC; 1; 2	LEC; 2; 5	HUN; 1; 3	HUN; 2; 8	MNZ; 1; 4	MNZ; 2; 3	**1st**	**231.5**

=== Complete Auto GP results ===
(key) (Races in bold indicate pole position) (Races in italics indicate fastest lap)

Year	Entrant	1	2	3	4	5	6	7	8	9	10	11	12	13	14	15	16	Pos	Points
2013	Zele Racing	MNZ; 1; 8	MNZ; 2; 2	MAR; 1; 8	MAR; 2; 1	HUN; 1; 16†	HUN; 2; 9	SIL; 1; 10	SIL; 2; 8	MUG; 1	MUG; 2	NÜR; 1	NÜR; 2	DON; 1	DON; 2	BRN; 1	BRN; 2	11th	49

=== Complete European Le Mans Series results ===
Year	Entrant	Class	Chassis	Engine	1	2	3	4	5	Rank	Points
2014	Greaves Motorsport	LMP2	Zytek Z11SN	Nissan VK45DE 4.5 L V8	SIL	IMO	RBR; 4	LEC; 5	EST; Ret	13th	22

=== Complete Blancpain GT Series results ===
Sporting positions
Preceded by Adrian Quaife-Hobbs	T Cars; Champion; 2006	Succeeded by Daniel Brown
Preceded by Mirko Bortolotti	FIA Formula Two Championship; Champion; 2012	Succeeded by Defunct
