= 2016 Renault Sport Series =

Seasons
- ← 2015 2017 →

The 2016 Renault Sport Series was the 12th season of Renault Sport's series of events, with two different championships racing under one banner. Consisting of the Eurocup Formula Renault 2.0 and Renault Sport Trophy, the Renault Sport Series ran at seven different venues where fans could get into the meetings for no cost whatsoever, such is the uniqueness of the series. It was the first season under the moniker Renault Sport Series.

The series began on 15 April at the Ciudad del Motor de Aragón in Alcañiz, and finished on 23 October at the Autódromo Fernanda Pires da Silva, just outside Estoril. Rounds at Bugatti Circuit, Hungaroring, Circuito de Jerez, Nürburgring and Silverstone Circuit were dropped. Rounds at Red Bull Ring, Circuit Paul Ricard and Autódromo Fernanda Pires da Silva returned to the series' schedule, with Eurocup had two extra races on its own, in support of the Monaco Grand Prix and Monza round of Clio Cup Italia and Renault Sport Trophy supported Imola round of the European Le Mans Series.

== Race calendar ==
- Event in light blue is not part of the Renault Sport Series, but is a championship round for the championship.

Circuit	Location	Date	Series	Winning driver	Winning team
(Spain) Ciudad del Motor de Aragón	Alcañiz, Spain	16 April	FR2.0 1	(Belgium) Max Defourny	(France) R-ace GP
(Spain) Ciudad del Motor de Aragón	Alcañiz, Spain	16 April	RST 1	(Finland) Markus Palttala (Germany) Fabian Schiller	(Spain) Team Marc VDS EG 0,0
(Spain) Ciudad del Motor de Aragón	Alcañiz, Spain	16 April	FR2.0 2	(United Kingdom) Lando Norris	(Germany) Josef Kaufmann Racing
(Spain) Ciudad del Motor de Aragón	Alcañiz, Spain	17 April	FR2.0 3	(France) Matthieu Vaxivière	(Czech Republic) Lotus
(Spain) Ciudad del Motor de Aragón	Alcañiz, Spain	17 April	RST 2	(Germany) Fabian Schiller	(Spain) Team Marc VDS EG 0,0
(Spain) Ciudad del Motor de Aragón	Alcañiz, Spain	17 April	RST 3	(Estonia) Kevin Korjus	(France) R-ace GP
(Italy) Autodromo Enzo e Dino Ferrari	Imola, Italy	14 May	RST 4	(Estonia) Kevin Korjus (Sweden) Fredrik Blomstedt	(France) R-ace GP
(Italy) Autodromo Enzo e Dino Ferrari	Imola, Italy	15 May	RST 5	(Germany) Fabian Schiller	(Spain) Team Marc VDS EG 0,0
(Italy) Autodromo Enzo e Dino Ferrari	Imola, Italy	15 May	RST 6	(Brazil) Bruno Bonifacio	(Italy) Oregon Team
Circuit de Monaco	Monte Carlo, Monaco	29 May	FR2.0 4	(France) Sacha Fenestraz	(France) Tech 1 Racing
(Italy) Autodromo Nazionale Monza	Monza, Italy	2 July	FR2.0 5	(United Kingdom) Lando Norris	(Germany) Josef Kaufmann Racing
(Italy) Autodromo Nazionale Monza	Monza, Italy	2 July	FR2.0 6	(France) Dorian Boccolacci	(France) Tech 1 Racing
(Italy) Autodromo Nazionale Monza	Monza, Italy	3 July	FR2.0 7	(United Kingdom) Harrison Scott	(Spain) AVF by Adrián Vallés
(Austria) Red Bull Ring	Spielberg, Austria	16 July	FR2.0 8	(United Kingdom) Lando Norris	(Germany) Josef Kaufmann Racing
(Austria) Red Bull Ring	Spielberg, Austria	16 July	RST 7	(Finland) Markus Palttala (Germany) Fabian Schiller	(Spain) Team Marc VDS EG 0,0
(Austria) Red Bull Ring	Spielberg, Austria	17 July	FR2.0 9	(United Kingdom) Harrison Scott	(Spain) AVF by Adrián Vallés
(Austria) Red Bull Ring	Spielberg, Austria	17 July	RST 8	(Spain) Fran Rueda	(Spain) Team Marc VDS EG 0,0
(Austria) Red Bull Ring	Spielberg, Austria	17 July	RST 9	(Netherlands) Pieter Schothorst	(Netherlands) Equipe Verschuur
(France) Circuit Paul Ricard	Le Castellet, France	27 August	FR2.0 10	(United Kingdom) Harrison Scott	(Spain) AVF by Adrián Vallés
(France) Circuit Paul Ricard	Le Castellet, France	27 August	RST 10	(Thailand) Tanart Sathienthirakul (Spain) Fran Rueda	(Spain) Team Marc VDS EG 0,0
(France) Circuit Paul Ricard	Le Castellet, France	28 August	FR2.0 11	(United Kingdom) Lando Norris	(Germany) Josef Kaufmann Racing
(France) Circuit Paul Ricard	Le Castellet, France	28 August	RST 11	(Sweden) Fredrik Blomstedt	(France) R-ace GP
(France) Circuit Paul Ricard	Le Castellet, France	28 August	RST 12	(Netherlands) Pieter Schothorst	(Netherlands) Equipe Verschuur
(Belgium) Circuit de Spa-Francorchamps	Spa, Belgium	24 September	FR2.0 12	(Switzerland) Hugo de Sadeleer	(France) Tech 1 Racing
(Belgium) Circuit de Spa-Francorchamps	Spa, Belgium	24 September	RST 13	(United Kingdom) Raoul Owens (Sweden) Fredrik Blomstedt	(France) R-ace GP
(Belgium) Circuit de Spa-Francorchamps	Spa, Belgium	25 September	FR2.0 13	(France) Dorian Boccolacci	(France) Tech 1 Racing
(Belgium) Circuit de Spa-Francorchamps	Spa, Belgium	25 September	RST 14	(Germany) Fabian Schiller	(Spain) Team Marc VDS EG 0,0
(Belgium) Circuit de Spa-Francorchamps	Spa, Belgium	25 September	RST 15	(Netherlands) Pieter Schothorst	(Netherlands) Equipe Verschuur
(Portugal) Autódromo Fernanda Pires da Silva	Estoril, Portugal	22 October	FR2.0 14	(United Kingdom) Will Palmer	(France) R-ace GP
(Portugal) Autódromo Fernanda Pires da Silva	Estoril, Portugal	22 October	RST 16	(Netherlands) Steijn Schothorst (Portugal) Miguel Ramos	(Netherlands) Equipe Verschuur
(Portugal) Autódromo Fernanda Pires da Silva	Estoril, Portugal	23 October	FR2.0 15	(France) Sacha Fenestraz	(France) Tech 1 Racing
(Portugal) Autódromo Fernanda Pires da Silva	Estoril, Portugal	23 October	RST 17	(Germany) Fabian Schiller	(Spain) Team Marc VDS EG 0,0
(Portugal) Autódromo Fernanda Pires da Silva	Estoril, Portugal	23 October	RST 18	(Netherlands) Steijn Schothorst	(Netherlands) Equipe Verschuur

Icon	Championship
FR2.0	Eurocup Formula Renault 2.0
RST	Renault Sport Trophy

== Championships ==
=== Eurocup Formula Renault 2.0 ===
Pos.	Driver	Team	Points
1	(United Kingdom) Lando Norris	(Germany) Josef Kaufmann Racing	253
2	(France) Dorian Boccolacci	(France) Tech 1 Racing	200
3	(Belgium) Max Defourny	(France) R-ace GP	188.5
4	(United Kingdom) Harrison Scott	(Spain) AVF by Adrián Vallés	172
5	(France) Sacha Fenestraz	(France) Tech 1 Racing	119.5

=== Renault Sport Trophy ===
==== Endurance ====
Pos.	Driver	Team	Points
1	(Germany) Fabian Schiller (Finland) Markus Palttala	(Spain) Team Marc VDS EG 0,0	87
2	(Sweden) Frederik Blomstedt	(France) R-ace GP	82
3	(Portugal) Miguel Ramos	(Netherlands) Equipe Verschuur	78
4	(Estonia) Kevin Korjus	(France) R-ace GP	67
5	(Thailand) Tanart Sathienthirakul (Spain) Fran Rueda	(Spain) Team Marc VDS EG 0,0	63

==== Pro ====
Pos.	Driver	Team	Points
1	(Netherlands) Pieter Schothorst	(Netherlands) Equipe Verschuur	156
2	(Estonia) Kevin Korjus	(France) R-ace GP	111
3	(Finland) Markus Palttala	(Spain) Team Marc VDS EG 0,0	105
4	(Italy) David Fumanelli	(Italy) Oregon Team	95
5	(Thailand) Tanart Sathienthirakul	(Spain) Team Marc VDS EG 0,0	52

==== Am ====
Pos.	Driver	Team	Points
1	(Germany) Fabian Schiller	(Spain) Team Marc VDS EG 0,0	178
2	(Spain) Fran Rueda	(Spain) Team Marc VDS EG 0,0	147
3	(Sweden) Fredrik Blomstedt	(France) R-ace GP	115
4	(Portugal) Miguel Ramos	(Netherlands) Equipe Verschuur	103
5	(Colombia) Andrés Méndez	(Italy) Oregon Team	64
