= Henry Surtees =

British racing driver (1991–2009)

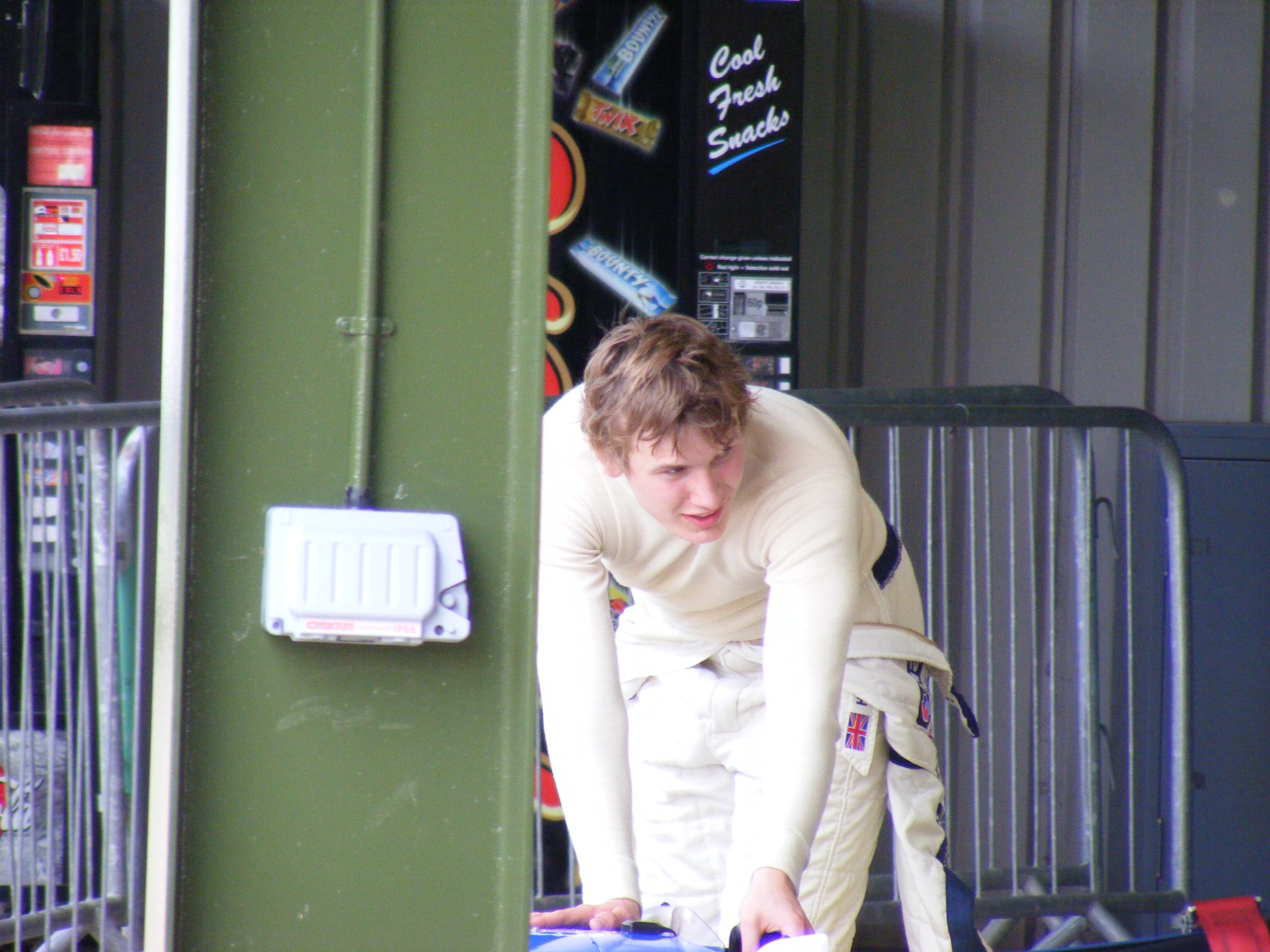
- Surtees in 2008
- Nationality: British
- Born: Henry John Surtees; 18 February 1991 Lingfield, Surrey, England
- Died: 19 July 2009 (aged 18) Whitechapel, London, England

FIA Formula Two Championship
- Years active: 2009
- Teams: MotorSport Vision
- Car number: 7
- Starts: 7
- Wins: 0
- Poles: 1
- Fastest laps: 0
- Best finish: 14th in 2009

Previous series
- 2008 2008 2007–08 2007–08 2007 2007 2006: British F3; Formula Renault WEC; Formula Renault UK; FRUK Winter Series; Formula BMW ADAC; Formula BMW UK; Ginetta GT Juniors

Henry John Surtees (18 February 1991 – 19 July 2009) was a British racing driver and the son of John Surtees. He died during a Formula Two race at Brands Hatch when he was struck by a wheel which came off another car which had spun into a wall.

Surtees was the son of former Formula One driver John Surtees, who won the 1964 Formula One season with Ferrari.

== Career ==
=== Formula BMW UK ===
Surtees finished his debut season in the championship seventh in the overall points standings, and second in the Rookie Cup. During a season in which the second half was dominated by fellow rookie Marcus Ericsson, Surtees claimed one pole position (Thruxton), one race win (Donington Park) and two fastest laps (Rockingham and Snetterton) while driving for the Carlin Motorsport team. The season was marred by penalties and a disqualification at Oulton Park.

=== Formula Renault ===
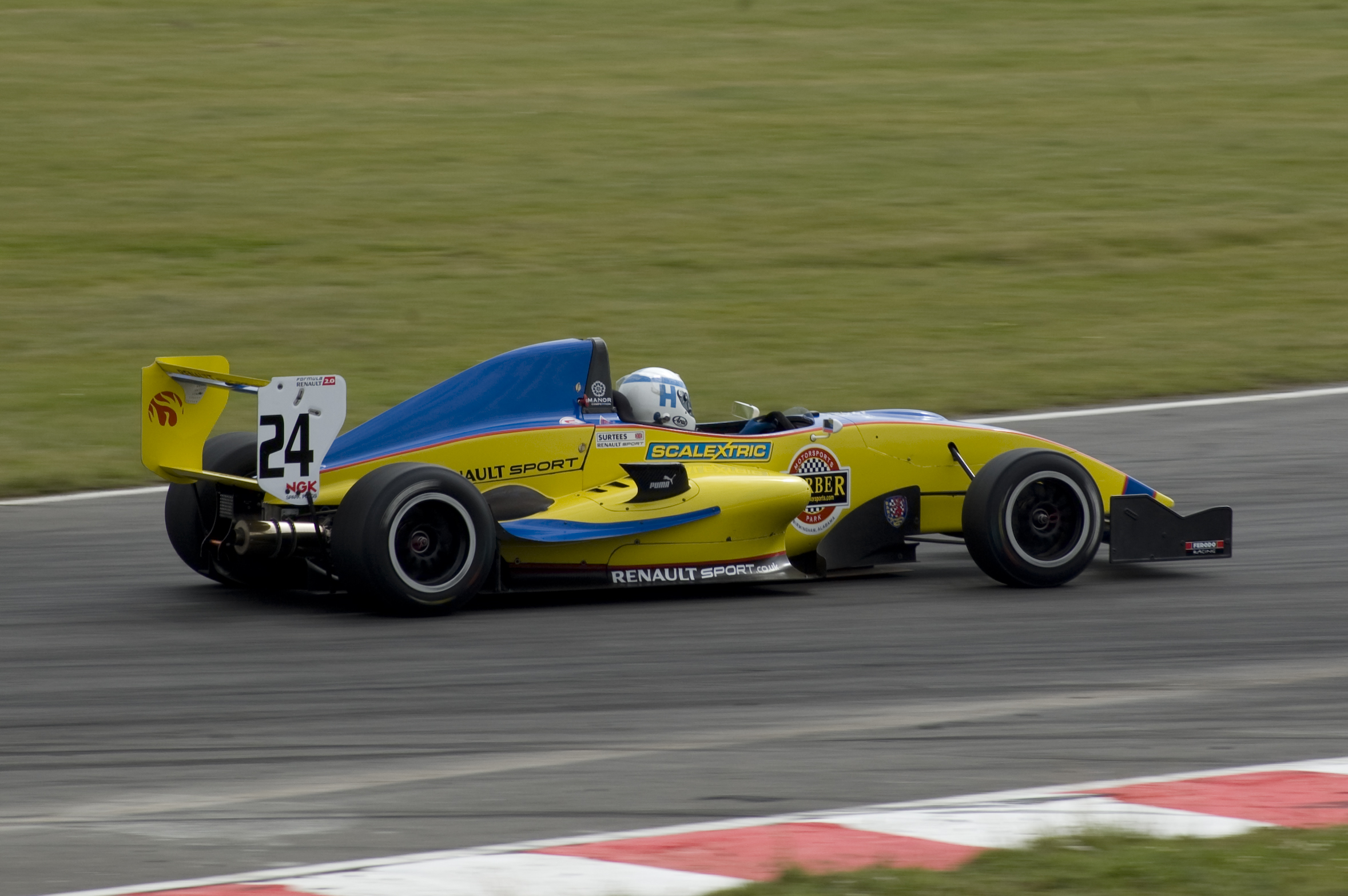
Surtees racing at Snetterton in 2008

After two races in 2007, Surtees moved up full-time to the Formula Renault UK series in 2008 with Manor Competition. He finished 12th in the championship, including a third-place finish at Silverstone's National Circuit. He also competed in the Winter Series again, having finished 13th in 2007. He battled James Calado for the title, with Calado coming out on top.

=== Formula Three ===
Surtees competed in one race meeting during the 2008 season, in the final two races at Donington Park for Carlin Motorsport. Surtees took a win and a second in his two races in the National Class.

=== Formula Two ===
Surtees signed up to the revived FIA Formula Two Championship ahead of the 2009 season on 2 January 2009. He drove car No. 7 in the series. He scored a podium in the first of the two races at Brands Hatch, coming third, and achieved a pole position at Brno. His results placed him fourteenth in the championship, at the end of the season.

== Death ==
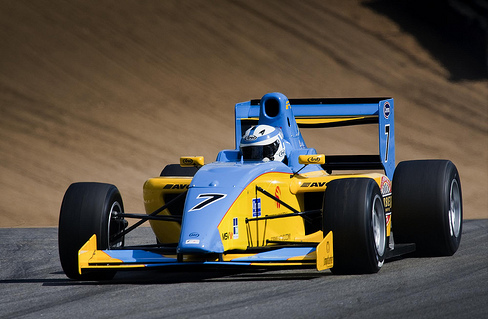
Surtees at Brands Hatch the day before his fatal accident

At Brands Hatch on 19 July 2009, during a Formula Two race, Surtees was hit on the head by a wheel from the car of Jack Clarke after Clarke spun into the wall exiting Westfield Bend. The wheel broke its tether and bounced back across the track into the following group of cars and collided with Surtees's helmet. The mass of the wheel assembly hitting his head was 29 kilograms (64 lb), and given that his car was travelling at 161 kilometres per hour (100 mph) at the time the wheel struck, the impact yielded approximately 30,000 joules of kinetic energy. The car continued straight ahead into the barrier on the approach to Sheene Curve, also losing a wheel, and came to rest at the end of the curve with its remaining rear wheel still spinning and the engine at its RPM limiter. This indicated that Surtees had lost consciousness, with his foot still pressing the accelerator.

Surtees was extricated from the car and taken to the circuit's medical centre, where he was stabilized before being transferred to the Royal London Hospital. He was pronounced brain dead later that day. He was 18 years old. Surtees's death was attributed to severe head injuries, inflicted by colliding with Clarke's wheel, rather than the subsequent crash with the barriers. His parents elected to donate his organs for transplant, a decision which was credited with saving five lives. Surtees' funeral took place on 30 July at Worth Abbey, near Turners Hill, West Sussex.

Surtees was buried at St. Peter and St. Paul's Church in Lingfield, Surrey; in 2017, his father John was buried next to him.

== Legacy ==
In June 2010, a group of Surtees' school friends swam the English Channel in stints to raise money for charity in his memory. A cafe at his former school was named The Pit Stop in memory of him.

=== Additional wheel tethers ===
Surtees' death, along with an increasing number of accidents where wheels were torn off their mountings, led to the number of wheel tethers being doubled to two per wheel for the 2011 Formula One World Championship season.

=== Halo cockpit protection ===
The FIA introduced a mandatory titanium-carbon fibre "halo" cockpit protection structure for the 2018 Formula One and Formula 2 championships. Surtees's fatal impact was one of many simulated with the halo device, and the FIA concluded that Surtees's outcome likely would have been improved by the presence of a halo. The utility of the halo, controversial and criticised when introduced, was proven in the 2018 Belgian Grand Prix, when a wheel from the spinning and airborne car of Fernando Alonso solidly struck the halo structure of Charles Leclerc's car. The halo was credited with potentially preventing a serious injury to Leclerc, if not outright saving his life.

=== Henry Surtees Award ===
In 2010, the Henry Surtees Award was launched, to be awarded annually for the most outstanding performance by a rising motor racer. Its first winner was Formula Renault UK champion Tom Blomqvist, followed by British & European Formula Ford champion Scott Malvern in 2011.

=== Henry Surtees Foundation ===
Also in 2010, the Henry Surtees Foundation was founded as a charitable organisation by his father John, to assist victims of accidental brain injuries and to promote safety in driving and motorsport.

== Racing record ==
=== Career summary ===
Season	Series	Team	Races	Wins	Poles	F/Laps	Podiums	Points	Position
2006	Ginetta Junior Championship	N/A	12	3	0	3	6	236	**3rd**
2007	Formula BMW ADAC	ADAC Berlin-Brandenburg	2	0	0	0	0	24	29th
2007	Formula BMW UK	Carlin Motorsport	18	1	1	2	8	491	6th
2007	Formula Renault 2.0 UK	Carlin Motorsport	2	0	0	0	0	13	22nd
2007	Formula Renault 2.0 UK Winter Series	Carlin Motorsport	4	0	0	0	0	35	13th
2008	British F3 National Class	Carlin Motorsport	2	1	0	0	2	35	11th
2008	Formula Renault 2.0 West European Cup	Manor Competition	2	0	0	0	0	0	NC†
2008	Formula Renault 2.0 UK	Manor Competition	20	0	0	0	1	203	12th
2008	Formula Renault 2.0 UK Winter Series	Manor Competition	4	1	1	0	3	113	**2nd**
2009	FIA Formula Two Championship	MotorSport Vision	8*	0	1	0	1	8	14th

† As Surtees was a guest driver, he was ineligible to score points.

* Surtees died during round eight of the sixteen-round series.

=== Complete FIA Formula Two Championship results ===
(key) (races in bold indicate pole position) (races in italics indicate fastest lap)

Year	1	2	3	4	5	6	7	8	9	10	11	12	13	14	15	16	DC	Points
2009	VAL; 1; 7	VAL; 2; 12	BRN; 1 Ret	**BRN**; **2** Ret	SPA; 1; 15	SPA; 2 Ret	BRH; 1; 3	BRH; 2 Ret	DON; 1	DON; 2	OSC; 1	OSC; 2	IMO; 1	IMO; 2	CAT; 1	CAT; 2	14th	8
