= 2015 Renault Sport Trophy =

The 2015 Renault Sport Trophy season was the inaugural season of the Renault–supported touring car category, a one-make racing series that is part of the World Series by Renault. The season began at Circuit de Spa-Francorchamps on 30 May and finished on 18 October at Circuito de Jerez. The series formed part of the World Series by Renault meetings at six triple header rounds.

Andrea Pizzitola won the Elite Class, Dario Capitanio gained both the Prestige Class and the Endurance Trophy, sharing the car with David Fumanelli. Oregon Team won the teams' championship.

== Teams and drivers ==
Team	No.	Drivers	Class	Rounds
(Netherlands) Equipe Verschuur	1	(Portugal) Miguel Ramos	E	1–2, 4, 6
(Netherlands) Equipe Verschuur	1	(Netherlands) Pieter Schothorst	E	3, 5
(Netherlands) Equipe Verschuur	1	(Portugal) António Coimbra	P	1–4, 6
(Netherlands) Equipe Verschuur	1	(Netherlands) Max van Splunteren	P	5
(Netherlands) Equipe Verschuur	10	(Netherlands) Steijn Schothorst	E	All
(Netherlands) Equipe Verschuur	10	(Netherlands) Jeroen Schothorst	P	All
(France) ART Junior Team	2	(France) Andrea Pizzitola	E	All
(France) ART Junior Team	2	(Slovakia) Richard Gonda	P	All
(France) ART Junior Team	3	(Netherlands) Indy Dontje	E	All
(France) ART Junior Team	3	(Spain) Toni Forné	P	All
(Netherlands) V8 Racing	4	(Netherlands) Roy Geerts	E	1–5
(Netherlands) V8 Racing	4	(Netherlands) Meindert van Buuren	E	6
(Netherlands) V8 Racing	4	(Netherlands) Max Braams	P	All
(Netherlands) V8 Racing	5	(Netherlands) Nicky Pastorelli	E	All
(Netherlands) V8 Racing	5	(Netherlands) Diederik Sijthoff	P	All
(Netherlands) V8 Racing	45	(Italy) Federico Leo	E	1–2
(Netherlands) V8 Racing	45	(United Kingdom) Archie Hamilton	E	3
(Netherlands) V8 Racing	45	(Netherlands) Duncan Huisman	E	5
(Netherlands) V8 Racing	45	(Italy) Stefano Costantini	P	1–3
(Netherlands) V8 Racing	45	(Germany) Oliver Freymuth	P	4
(Netherlands) V8 Racing	45	(Netherlands) Jelle Beelen	P	5
(Italy) Oregon Team	6	(United Kingdom) Luciano Bacheta	E	All
(Italy) Oregon Team	6	(Italy) Niccolò Nalio	P	All
(Italy) Oregon Team	7	(Brazil) Alan Hellmeister	E	All
(Italy) Oregon Team	7	(Brazil) Adalberto Baptista	P	All
(Italy) Oregon Team	8	(Italy) David Fumanelli	E	All
(Italy) Oregon Team	8	(Italy) Dario Capitanio	P	All
(Austria) Zele Racing	9	(Italy) Vittorio Ghirelli	E	1–4
(Austria) Zele Racing	9	(Austria) Christian Klien	E	5–6
(Austria) Zele Racing	9	(France) Philippe Bourgois	P	1–5
(Austria) Zele Racing	9	(Switzerland) Christof von Grünigen	P	6
(Austria) Zele Racing	11	(Netherlands) Bas Schothorst	E	All
(Austria) Zele Racing	11	(France) Philippe Haezebrouck	P	1–2
(Austria) Zele Racing	11	(Colombia) Andrés Méndez	P	3–6
(Spain) Monlau Competición	14	(Belgium) Wolfgang Reip	E	1–2
(Spain) Monlau Competición	14	(France) Paul-Loup Chatin	E	3
(Spain) Monlau Competición	14	(Italy) Michela Cerruti	E	4
(Spain) Monlau Competición	14	(France) Vincent Capillaire	E	5
(Spain) Monlau Competición	14	(France) Nelson Panciatici	E	6
(Spain) Monlau Competición	14	(Belgium) Sarah Bovy	P	1
(Spain) Monlau Competición	14	(Spain) David Cebrián	P	2
(Spain) Monlau Competición	14	(United Kingdom) Chris Harris	P	3
(Spain) Monlau Competición	14	(France) Éric Trémoulet	P	4
(Spain) Monlau Competición	14	(France) Antoine Boulay	P	5
(Spain) Monlau Competición	14	(France) Jean Ragnotti	P	6
(Spain) Monlau Competición	15	(Spain) José Manuel Pérez-Aicart	E	6
(Spain) Monlau Competición	15	(Belgium) Jürgen Smet	P	6

Icon	Class
E	Elite
P	Prestige

== Race calendar and results ==
Round		Circuit	Date	Pole position	Fastest lap	Winning driver	Winning team
1	En	(Belgium) Circuit de Spa-Francorchamps, Spa	30 May	(France) Andrea Pizzitola (Slovakia) Richard Gonda	(Netherlands) Bas Schothorst (France) Philippe Haezebrouck	(Italy) David Fumanelli (Italy) Dario Capitanio	(Italy) Oregon Team
1	P	(Belgium) Circuit de Spa-Francorchamps, Spa	31 May	(Slovakia) Richard Gonda	(Belgium) Sarah Bovy	(Netherlands) Diederik Sijthoff	(Netherlands) V8 Racing
1	E	(Belgium) Circuit de Spa-Francorchamps, Spa	31 May	(France) Andrea Pizzitola	(Netherlands) Steijn Schothorst	(Netherlands) Steijn Schothorst	(Netherlands) Equipe Verschuur
2	En	(Hungary) Hungaroring, Budapest	13 June	(Netherlands) Steijn Schothorst (Netherlands) Jeroen Schothorst	(Netherlands) Steijn Schothorst (Netherlands) Jeroen Schothorst	(Belgium) Wolfgang Reip (Spain) David Cebrián	(Spain) Monlau Competición
2	P	(Hungary) Hungaroring, Budapest	14 June	(Slovakia) Richard Gonda	(Slovakia) Richard Gonda	(Slovakia) Richard Gonda	(France) ART Junior Team
2	E	(Hungary) Hungaroring, Budapest	14 June	(Netherlands) Steijn Schothorst	(Netherlands) Steijn Schothorst	(Netherlands) Steijn Schothorst	(Netherlands) Equipe Verschuur
3	En	(United Kingdom) Silverstone Circuit	5 September	(United Kingdom) Luciano Bacheta (Italy) Niccolò Nalio	(Netherlands) Pieter Schothorst (Portugal) António Coimbra	(United Kingdom) Luciano Bacheta (Italy) Niccolò Nalio	(Italy) Oregon Team
3	P	(United Kingdom) Silverstone Circuit	6 September	(Italy) Niccolò Nalio	(Italy) Niccolò Nalio	(Italy) Niccolò Nalio	(Italy) Oregon Team
3	E	(United Kingdom) Silverstone Circuit	6 September	(Netherlands) Pieter Schothorst	(Netherlands) Pieter Schothorst	(Netherlands) Pieter Schothorst	(Netherlands) Equipe Verschuur
4	En	(Germany) Nürburgring, Nürburg	12 September	(Netherlands) Roy Geerts (Netherlands) Max Braams	(Netherlands) Roy Geerts (Netherlands) Max Braams	(Netherlands) Roy Geerts (Netherlands) Max Braams	(Netherlands) V8 Racing
4	P	(Germany) Nürburgring, Nürburg	13 September	(Italy) Dario Capitanio	(Italy) Dario Capitanio	(Italy) Dario Capitanio	(Italy) Oregon Team
4	E	(Germany) Nürburgring, Nürburg	13 September	(Netherlands) Roy Geerts	(France) Andrea Pizzitola	(France) Andrea Pizzitola	(France) ART Junior Team
5	En	(France) Bugatti Circuit, Le Mans	26 September	(France) Andrea Pizzitola (Slovakia) Richard Gonda	(Netherlands) Steijn Schothorst (Netherlands) Jeroen Schothorst	(France) Andrea Pizzitola (Slovakia) Richard Gonda	(France) ART Junior Team
5	P	(France) Bugatti Circuit, Le Mans	27 September	(Slovakia) Richard Gonda	(Netherlands) Max Braams	(Italy) Dario Capitanio	(Italy) Oregon Team
5	E	(France) Bugatti Circuit, Le Mans	27 September	(Italy) David Fumanelli	(Netherlands) Pieter Schothorst	(Italy) David Fumanelli	(Italy) Oregon Team
6	En	(Spain) Circuito de Jerez, Jerez de la Frontera	17 October	(Italy) David Fumanelli (Italy) Dario Capitanio	(France) Andrea Pizzitola (Slovakia) Richard Gonda	(France) Andrea Pizzitola (Slovakia) Richard Gonda	(France) ART Junior Team
6	P	(Spain) Circuito de Jerez, Jerez de la Frontera	18 October	(Slovakia) Richard Gonda	(Slovakia) Richard Gonda	(Italy) Dario Capitanio	(Italy) Oregon Team
6	E	(Spain) Circuito de Jerez, Jerez de la Frontera	18 October	(Italy) David Fumanelli	(Netherlands) Steijn Schothorst	(Netherlands) Indy Dontje	(France) ART Junior Team

== Championship standings ==
For Elite and Prestige Class only eight results out of nine counted for the championship.

=== Elite class ===
Pos.	Driver	SPA (Belgium)	HUN (Hungary)		SIL (United Kingdom)	NÜR (Germany)		LMS (France)	JER (Spain)		Pts.
Pos.	Driver	E	En	E	E	En	E	E	En	E	Pts.
1	(France) Andrea Pizzitola	2	3	(5)	4	3	1	4	1	3	140
2	(Netherlands) Steijn Schothorst	**1**	**1**	**1**	Ret	4	2	Ret	2	4	138
3	(Italy) David Fumanelli	Ret	4	6	5	2	4	**1**	**8**	6	103
4	(Netherlands) Indy Dontje	6	8	10	2	5	3	DNS	3	1	96
5	(United Kingdom) Luciano Bacheta	4	7	7	Ret	Ret	5	5	7	7	62
6	(Netherlands) Nicky Pastorelli	9	Ret	9	3	11	6	2	4	Ret	57
7	(Netherlands) Roy Geerts	8	9	2	11	**1**	**Ret**	Ret			49
8	(Netherlands) Bas Schothorst	10	6	13	6	7	11	7	5	8	49
9	(Italy) Vittorio Ghirelli	5	5	3	9	6	10				46
10	(Belgium) Wolfgang Reip	3	2	4							45
11	(Netherlands) Pieter Schothorst				**1**			3			40
12	(Brazil) Alan Hellmeister	DNS	Ret	12	8	8	7	8	12	Ret	22
13	(Portugal) Miguel Ramos	Ret	10	11		9	9		10	9	15
14	(Italy) Federico Leo	7	Ret	8							10
15	(France) Paul-Loup Chatin				7						6
16	(Italy) Michela Cerruti					10	8				5
17	(United Kingdom) Archie Hamilton				10						1
Guest drivers ineligible for points
	(Austria) Christian Klien							6	9	2	0
	(Spain) José Manuel Pérez-Aicart								13	5	0
	(France) Nelson Panciatici								6	11	0
	(France) Vincent Capillaire							9			0
	(Netherlands) Meindert van Buuren								11	10	0
	(Netherlands) Duncan Huisman							10			0
Pos.	Driver	E	En	E	E	En	E	E	En	E	Pts.
Pos.	Driver	SPA (Belgium)	HUN (Hungary)		SIL (United Kingdom)	NÜR (Germany)		LMS (France)	JER (Spain)		Pts.

Colour	Result
Gold	Winner
Silver	Second place
Bronze	Third place
Green	Points classification
Blue	Non-points classification
Blue	Non-classified finish (NC)
Purple	Retired, not classified (Ret)
Red	Did not qualify (DNQ)
Red	Did not pre-qualify (DNPQ)
Black	Disqualified (DSQ)
White	Did not start (DNS)
White	Withdrew (WD)
White	Race cancelled (C)
Blank	Did not practice (DNP)
Blank	Did not arrive (DNA)
Blank	Excluded (EX)

**Bold** – Pole
Italics – Fastest Lap

=== Prestige class ===
Pos.	Driver	SPA (Belgium)		HUN (Hungary)	SIL (United Kingdom)		NÜR (Germany)	LMS (France)		JER (Spain)	Pts.
Pos.	Driver	En	P	P	En	P	P	En	P	P	Pts.
1	(Italy) Dario Capitanio	3	Ret	2	2	2	**1**	2	1	1	162
2	(Slovakia) Richard Gonda	**1**	**Ret**	**1**	Ret	Ret	4	**1**	**2**	**3**	123
3	(Netherlands) Diederik Sijthoff	4	1	3	5	(6)	5	3	4	6	109
4	(Italy) Niccolò Nalio	2	Ret	Ret	**1**	**1**	2	8	5	13	103
5	(Netherlands) Max Braams	5	5	4	4	4	3	(9)	3	4	101
6	(Spain) Toni Forné	7	2	7	3	3	6	Ret	Ret	5	81
7	(Italy) Stefano Costantini	6	4	5	11	5					40
8	(Colombia) Andrés Méndez				7	Ret	7	10	9	8	28
9	(Netherlands) Jeroen Schothorst	Ret	Ret	10	8	8	12	7	10	9	27
10	(France) Philippe Bourgois	12	6	9	Ret	9	Ret	4	Ret		24
11	(Belgium) Sarah Bovy	8	3								19
12	(Brazil) Adalberto Baptista	11	Ret	11	10	10	9	6	11	10	19
13	(Portugal) António Coimbra	9	Ret	8	9	Ret	10			7	17
14	(United Kingdom) Chris Harris				6	7					14
15	(Spain) David Cebrián			6							8
16	(France) Philippe Haezebrouck	10	7	12							7
17	(Germany) Oliver Freymuth						8				4
	(France) Éric Trémoulet						11				0
Guest drivers ineligible for points
	(Switzerland) Christof von Grünigen									2	0
	(Netherlands) Max van Splunteren							DSQ	6		0
	(France) Antoine Boulay							7	8		0
	(Netherlands) Jelle Beelen							Ret	7		0
	(France) Jean Ragnotti									11	0
	(Belgium) Jürgen Smet									12	0
Pos.	Driver	En	P	P	En	P	P	En	P	P	Pts.
Pos.	Driver	SPA (Belgium)		HUN (Hungary)	SIL (United Kingdom)		NÜR (Germany)	LMS (France)		JER (Spain)	Pts.

Colour	Result
Gold	Winner
Silver	Second place
Bronze	Third place
Green	Points classification
Blue	Non-points classification
Blue	Non-classified finish (NC)
Purple	Retired, not classified (Ret)
Red	Did not qualify (DNQ)
Red	Did not pre-qualify (DNPQ)
Black	Disqualified (DSQ)
White	Did not start (DNS)
White	Withdrew (WD)
White	Race cancelled (C)
Blank	Did not practice (DNP)
Blank	Did not arrive (DNA)
Blank	Excluded (EX)

**Bold** – Pole
Italics – Fastest Lap

=== Endurance Trophy ===
Pos.	Driver	SPA (Belgium)	HUN (Hungary)	SIL (United Kingdom)	NÜR (Germany)	LMS (France)	JER (Spain)	Pts.
1	(Italy) David Fumanelli (Italy) Dario Capitanio	1	2	2	2	2	**2**	115
2	(France) Andrea Pizzitola (Slovakia) Richard Gonda	**3**	3	Ret	3	**1**	1	95
3	(United Kingdom) Luciano Bacheta (Italy) Niccolò Nalio	2	4	**1**	Ret	9	3	72
4	(Netherlands) Max Braams	9	8	4	**1**	7	7	57
5	(Netherlands) Roy Geerts	9	8	4	**1**	7		49
6	(Netherlands) Nicky Pastorelli (Netherlands) Diederik Sijthoff	11	Ret	5	7	3	4	43
7	(Netherlands) Indy Dontje (Spain) Toni Forné	5	6	3	5	Ret	Ret	43
8	(Belgium) Wolfgang Reip	4	1					37
9	(Netherlands) Bas Schothorst	6	9	6	8	8	6	36
10	(Colombia) Andrés Méndez			6	8	8	6	26
11	(Portugal) António Coimbra	7	7	Ret	6		8	24
12	(Portugal) Miguel Ramos	7	7		6		8	24
13	(Spain) David Cebrián		1					25
14	(Netherlands) Steijn Schothorst (Netherlands) Jeroen Schothorst	Ret	**5**	Ret	Ret	4	Ret	22
15	(Brazil) Alan Hellmeister (Brazil) Adalberto Baptista	8	Ret	7	DSQ	6	10	22
16	(Italy) Michela Cerruti (France) Éric Trémoulet				4			12
17	(France) Philippe Bourgois	Ret	10	Ret	Ret	5		11
18	(France) Philippe Haezebrouck	6	9					10
19	(France) Paul-Loup Chatin (United Kingdom) Chris Harris			8				4
20	(Germany) Oliver Freymuth				9			2
21	(Italy) Vittorio Ghirelli	Ret	10	Ret	Ret			1
22	(Italy) Stefano Costantini	10	Ret	Ret				1
23	(Italy) Federico Leo	10	Ret					1
	(Netherlands) Pieter Schothorst			Ret		DSQ		0
	(United Kingdom) Archie Hamilton			Ret				0
Guest drivers ineligible for points
	(Austria) Christian Klien					5	5	0
	(Switzerland) Christof von Grünigen						5	0
	(Netherlands) Meindert van Buuren						7	0
	(France) Nelson Panciatici (France) Jean Ragnotti						9	0
	(Spain) José Manuel Pérez-Aicart (Belgium) Jürgen Smet						Ret	0
	(France) Vincent Capillaire (France) Antoine Boulay					Ret		0
	(Netherlands) Duncan Huisman (Netherlands) Jelle Beelen					Ret		0
	(Netherlands) Max van Splunteren					DSQ		0
Pos.	Driver	SPA (Belgium)	HUN (Hungary)	SIL (United Kingdom)	NÜR (Germany)	LMS (France)	JER (Spain)	Pts.

Colour	Result
Gold	Winner
Silver	Second place
Bronze	Third place
Green	Points classification
Blue	Non-points classification
Blue	Non-classified finish (NC)
Purple	Retired, not classified (Ret)
Red	Did not qualify (DNQ)
Red	Did not pre-qualify (DNPQ)
Black	Disqualified (DSQ)
White	Did not start (DNS)
White	Withdrew (WD)
White	Race cancelled (C)
Blank	Did not practice (DNP)
Blank	Did not arrive (DNA)
Blank	Excluded (EX)

**Bold** – Pole
Italics – Fastest Lap

=== Teams' Championship ===
Pos.	Team	No.	SPA (Belgium)			HUN (Hungary)			SIL (United Kingdom)			NÜR (Germany)			LMS (France)			JER (Spain)			Pts.
Pos.	Team	No.	En	P	E	En	P	E	En	P	E	En	P	E	En	P	E	En	P	E	Pts.
1	(Italy) Oregon Team	6	2	Ret	4	4	Ret	7	1	1	Ret	Ret	2	5	9	5	5	3	13	7	454
1	(Italy) Oregon Team	8	1	Ret	Ret	2	2	6	2	2	5	2	1	4	2	1	1	2	1	6	454
2	(France) ART Junior Team	2	3	Ret	2	3	1	5	Ret	Ret	4	3	4	1	1	2	4	1	3	3	424
2	(France) ART Junior Team	3	5	2	6	6	7	10	3	3	2	5	6	3	Ret	Ret	DNS	Ret	5	1	424
3	(Netherlands) V8 Racing	4	9	5	8	8	4	2	4	4	11	1	3	Ret	7	3	Ret	7	4	10	315
3	(Netherlands) V8 Racing	5	11	1	9	Ret	3	9	5	6	3	7	5	6	3	4	2	4	6	Ret	315
4	(Netherlands) Equipe Verschuur	1	7	Ret	Ret	7	8	11	Ret	Ret	1	6	10	9	DSQ	6	3	8	7	9	210
4	(Netherlands) Equipe Verschuur	10	Ret	Ret	1	5	10	1	Ret	8	Ret	Ret	12	2	4	10	Ret	Ret	9	4	210
5	(Austria) Zele Racing	9	Ret	6	5	10	9	3	Ret	9	9	Ret	Ret	10	5	Ret	6	5	2	2	172
5	(Austria) Zele Racing	11	6	7	10	9	11	13	6	Ret	6	8	7	11	8	9	7	6	8	8	172
6	(Spain) Monlau Competición	14	4	3	3	1	6	4	8	7	7	4	11	8	Ret	8	9	9	11	11	139
6	(Spain) Monlau Competición	15																Ret	12	4	139
Pos.	Team	No.	En	P	E	En	P	E	En	P	E	En	P	E	En	P	E	En	P	E	Pts.
Pos.	Team	No.	SPA (Belgium)			HUN (Hungary)			SIL (United Kingdom)			NÜR (Germany)			LMS (France)			JER (Spain)			Pts.

Colour	Result
Gold	Winner
Silver	Second place
Bronze	Third place
Green	Points classification
Blue	Non-points classification
Blue	Non-classified finish (NC)
Purple	Retired, not classified (Ret)
Red	Did not qualify (DNQ)
Red	Did not pre-qualify (DNPQ)
Black	Disqualified (DSQ)
White	Did not start (DNS)
White	Withdrew (WD)
White	Race cancelled (C)
Blank	Did not practice (DNP)
Blank	Did not arrive (DNA)
Blank	Excluded (EX)

**Bold** – Pole
Italics – Fastest Lap
