= MotorSport Vision =

Motorsport organisations

MotorSport Vision Limited
- Founded: 1997
- Founder: Jonathan Palmer; John Britten; Peter Ogden
- Headquarters: Fawkham, Longfield, Kent, United Kingdom
- Key people: Jonathan Palmer; Chief Executive
- Services: Motorsport
- Total assets: Circuito de Navarra; Brands Hatch; Snetterton Circuit; Oulton Park; Donington Park; Cadwell Park; Bedford Autodrome; GB3 Championship; GB4 Championship; British Superbike Championship
- Owner: MSV Group Ltd.
- Parent: MSV Group Ltd.
- Divisions: MSV TV

MotorSport Vision (MSV) is a motorsport organization based in the United Kingdom (UK). The company manages five racing venues across the UK and one in Spain (Circuito de Navarra) and is actively involved in managing both two-wheel and four-wheel racing championships. MSV also organizes the PalmerSport Corporate Driving experience.

== History ==
MotorSport Vision was founded by John Britten, Sir Peter Ogden and Jonathan Palmer in 1997. In 2004, it acquired the Brands Hatch, Oulton Park, Snetterton, and Cadwell Park motor racing circuits from Octagon, a division of The Interpublic Group of Companies (which previously acquired prior owner Brands Hatch Leisure plc in November 1999).

In 2006, MSV established MotorSport Vision Racing (MSVR), which provides comprehensive car and bike racing organization capabilities for the MotorSport Vision group. MSVR organizes over 35 events annually across 10+ UK circuits. MSV's track day division, MSV Trackdays, has grown to become one of the UK's largest track day companies, organizing both novice events and advanced driver training days. In addition to PalmerSport, MSV runs driving experiences at Brands Hatch, Donington Park, Oulton Park, and Snetterton.

MSV ran the Formula Palmer Audi championship from 1998 to 2010, providing a rival to Formula Three for young drivers to progress their careers.

In 2008 MSV also acquired the rights to the British Superbike Championship.

In September 2008, MotorSport Vision won an FIA tender to supply cars and operate the FIA Formula Two Championship, a new international single seater series derived from an FIA initiative to provide young drivers with the opportunity to compete in top-level racing on a competitive budget. The Formula Two cars, like Formula Palmer Audi, were assembled and prepared in a dedicated facility at Bedford Autodrome, also home to PalmerSport and FPA. This category was discontinued after 2012.

One of its founders, John Britten, died on 25 November 2009, after a long period of illness.

In 2013, MSV launched the BRDC Formula 4 Championship, selling all 24 cars within a month. The championship later evolved into the BRDC British F3 Championship, just before the start of the 2016 season.

In 2015, MSV completed the purchase of the freehold for a substantial former military airbase in northeastern France, which it plans to develop into a major international motorsports complex.

On 12 January 2017, MSV announced that it would take over the Donington Park circuit business and lease to the Donington Park Estate for an initial 21-year term.

The Donington Park portfolio was expanded in 2021 with the purchase of the Donington Hall estate, including the 18th-century hall, the Hastings House and Lansdowne workshop buildings, with plans to create a 40-bedroom hotel, a stabling facility for supercars, classic cars and motorbikes and workshops for high-end motor engineering businesses.

In August 2021, the BRDC British F3 Championship was rebranded as the GB3 Championship, and a month later, the creation of the GB4 Championship was also announced, for young drivers graduating from karting, club racing or junior saloons.

New plans were announced for the French Couvron facility in 2022, with the circuit described as being the first self-sufficient eco driving and race circuit. It will be powered entirely by renewable energy generated from a solar park on the same site.

On 30 September 2022 it was announced that MSV won the bid for purchasing Circuito de Navarra in northern Spain. MSV has since completed the first phase of its program of improvements.

== Circuits ==
=== Brands Hatch ===
In 1986, John Foulston bought Brands Hatch, Oulton Park, and Snetterton circuits from Grovewood Securities and established the Brands Hatch Leisure (BHL) company. The following year, the company acquired Cadwell Park before Foulston died testing a McLaren M15S Offenhauser at Silverstone. Ownership of BHL passed to his wife Mary, but the company was run by John Webb until 1990, when daughter Nicola Foulston took over the running. In that time, Brands Hatch hosted higher-profile series such as Formula 3000 and Superbike World Championship racing. 1988 saw further changes to the circuit layout, with a chicane added at Dingle Dell Corner, while Westfield Bend and Graham Hill Bend were tightened. New pits and a corporate entertainment facility were added in the late 1990s.

In 1999, Foulston announced that Brands Hatch had acquired the rights to the British Grand Prix from 2002. Whilst discussions were ongoing with regards to planning permission to bring the circuit up to F1 requirements, Foulston sold BHL to Octagon Motorsports (a subsidiary of Interpublic) for £120m. Octagon, however, failed to obtain the necessary planning permission and instead decided to lease Silverstone in order to host the Grand Prix. However, high-profile single-seater racing did return to Brands Hatch in 2003, when a round of the CART series was held at the circuit. Despite attracting around 40,000 spectators [5], the race was not retained for subsequent seasons.

With financial pressures stemming from running the British Grand Prix, Octagon sold off the group of four circuits, including Brands Hatch, to the MotorSport Vision group headed by ex-F1 driver Jonathan Palmer in 2004.

Subsequently, international racing returned to Brands Hatch with a large and diverse selection of events taking place at the Kent venue including the FIA World Touring Car Championship, the A1GP World Cup of Motorsport and the DTM (German Touring Cars). The circuit continues to play host to many major events including the American SpeedFest and the Blancpain GT Series, in addition to home-grown festivals such as Festival Italia and Deutsche Fest, plus all the major national motor racing championships, including Truck racing.

=== Oulton Park ===
In 2007, Oulton Park was voted the best UK circuit by British Superbike fans, whilst a BTCC meeting on Sunday 27 July 2008 saw a crowd of 35,000 attend - a record not only for the circuit but the highest crowd at any venue of the BTCC for a decade.

Spectator needs and safety at the circuit has been addressed in recent years, with new banking introduced at Lodge corner and the run-off area extended at Island corner.

The circuit remains a popular destination for the BTCC and BSB, while the traditional Easter weekend event for British GT is one of the championship's best-attended events of the season. The Oulton Park Gold Cup remains one of the UK's biggest historic race meetings, while accommodation at the circuit has also been improved with the addition of the Oulton Park Lodge at the start of the 2022 season.

=== Snetterton Circuit ===
Snetterton was taken over by MotorSport Vision in 2004. The circuit was re-profiled to create a new three mile-long circuit, the Snetterton 300, which incorporates a new infield section integrated with a revised version of the original Snetterton circuit. New spectator banking was also added to the track to improve circuit views, whilst the restaurant and toilet facilities have been updated or replaced. A new scrutineering bay was also added. As well as the 300 layout, the 200 and 100 variations allow multiple options for operating clubs.

Snetterton is regarded as being one of the fastest tracks in the UK thanks to several long straights and high-speed corners. The current lap record is held by Brazilian Felipe Nasr, who set the benchmark 1:39.933 time during a British F3 race in 2011.

The circuit continues to host rounds of the BTCC, BSB and British GT championships, as well as several truck races and added a new historic event, the Snetterton Historic 200, in 2022.

=== Cadwell Park ===
Cadwell Park has a high number of club car and bike race meetings and the annual British Superbike Championship round is one of the most popular events on the championship's calendar. The circuit also hosts a significant amount of car and bike track and test days. Several tests and feature clips for the motoring program Fifth Gear have been filmed here.

=== Bedford Autodrome ===
Bedford Autodrome is located in Thurleigh, near Bedford. No official motorsport events are held at the circuit but it is a popular public track day circuit and hosts the PalmerSport driving events, one of the leading corporate driving experience days anywhere in the world.

The venue has multiple track layouts and variations, including a karting track, and is also the headquarters of the GB3 and GB4 Championship.

=== Donington Park ===
In January 2017, the Donington circuit business was taken over by MotorSport Vision, with the Donington Park Estate on a 21 year lease, until 2038. The acquisition of the circuit was cleared unconditionally by the Competition and Markets Authority (CMA) in August 2017, with MSV immediately investing in a multi-million pound improvement programme over the winter of 2017/18.

Spectator and competitor facilities were transformed ahead of the 2018 season, with a new grandstand, toilet blocks, resurfaced paddock and external access roads and the Garage 39 restaurant introduced. A new circuit office was another addition, while the nearby Donington Hall was purchased in 2021.

=== Couvron ===
MSV will build a circuit at the former Laon-Couvron Air Base in France, 120 km (75 mi) northeast of Paris. Circuit plans were revised in 2022, with a shortened layout and the entire site set to be powered by renewable energy generated by a large 800 acre on-site solar park.

The circuit is designed to suit EVs and conventional internal combustion-powered cars, and is expected to host up to six race meetings a year as well as manufacturer testing and promotional events. The site will include a conference centre, and other business units.

=== Circuito de Navarra ===
On 30 September 2022, it was announced that MSV won the bid for purchasing Circuito de Navarra. Since then, the first phase of its programme of improvements has been completed, involving a complete overhaul of the race control complex. This included new screens and upgraded CCTV technology, along with a complete exterior redecoration of the race control tower and main pit buildings, including all the garage doors. This exterior aesthetic overhaul has extended beyond that area, elevating the FIA Grade 1T and Grade 2 circuit’s presentation to match its status as one of Spain’s best motorsport venues.

Circuito de Navarra is located near the town of Los Arcos and is a multi-discipline sporting complex featuring a 2.4 mile road course, half-mile karting circuit, skid pan, off-road area and facilities.

== Series ==
MotorSport Vision is the operator of several national categories on both two and four wheels, including British Superbikes, and open wheel championships such as the GB3 and GB4 Championships.

It also previously ran the Formula Palmer Audi and FIA Formula Two Championships.

Its MSV Racing arm administers 27 other racing categories including club level single-seaters, saloons, sports cars and prototypes. It runs over 45 motor racing events each season at circuits across the UK, whilst also running the UK round of the Formula E Championship.

=== Current series ===
==== British Superbike Championship ====
In 2008 MotorSport Vision took over the responsibility for the organisation and promotion of the British Superbike Championship from Dorna. The 2008 season was MSV's first in charge, and saw Shane Byrne take the title. The championship is screened live by Eurosport and Quest.

==== GB3 Championship ====
The GB3 Championship is recognised as the leading single-seater championship in the UK. As of 2024, the championship features nine teams and has averaged over 20 drivers per race since rebranding from BRDC British F3 in August 2021.

The origin of GB3 Championship can be traced back to the Formula 4 racing series operated by the 750 Motor Club. In September 2012, MSV reached a deal to use Formula 4 moniker to create the new BRDC Formula 4 Championship.

BRDC F4 was rebranded as the BRDC British Formula 3 Championship in 2016 to reflect the pace of the new cars in use from the 2016 season. Five years later, BRDC British F3 was rebranded as the GB3 Championship in 2021. Zak O'Sullivan was the first champion under the GB3 name, and went on to win the Autosport BRDC Award.

The series introduced a new car in 2022, the Tatuus MSV-022, featuring the halo safety device and a number of other safety and performance upgrades.

==== GB4 Championship ====
The GB4 Championship was announced in September 2021, and held its first event in April 2022. It is designed as an affordable route out of karting and club racing for young drivers, and to feed drivers up to GB3 and other championships.

The series uses the Tatuus F4-T014 car, which was used widely across Europe until the end of 2021, and is homologated until the end of 2023.

=== Former series ===
==== Formula Palmer Audi ====
Formula Palmer Audi, commonly known as FPA, was founded in 1998 by Jonathan Palmer. The ethos of FPA was to keep costs at a minimum whilst at all times promoting competitive and professional racing. The series was known for producing ex-F1 driver and IndyCar race-winner Justin Wilson and helping the career of triple World Touring Car Champion Andy Priaulx.

In order to keep a level playing field as much as possible, all the Formula Palmer Audi cars were run by a specialist team of FPA mechanics, rather than having separate teams. This concept of a large group of deliberately equalised cars was adopted by A1GP.

FPA announced a scholarship prize with the BRDC Stars of Tomorrow KF2 karting championship, and with the newly revived FIA Formula Two Championship, positioning the series as a fantastic intermediary step between karts and top-level single seaters.

FPA folded after the 2010 season.

==== FIA Formula Two Championship ====
The FIA Formula Two Championship was the revival of the Formula Two series that was highly successful from 1967 to 1985. It saw 24 drivers competing in identical MotorSport Vision-run cars with a 400 bhp Audi engine over 16 rounds.

The FIA's overall concern was that the cost of competing in motor racing at a level to progress directly to Formula One today is so high that it prevents many talented drivers from having the opportunity to participate.

In September 2008 the FIA tender to supply the cars and operate the FIA Formula Two Championship was awarded to MotorSport Vision. Compared to rival series, Formula Two hoped to cost significantly less per season whilst allowing drivers to prove their skill and develop their racecraft in identical vehicles designed by a six-man team from WilliamsF1, led by Director of Engineering Patrick Head. The series was marred by the death of Henry Surtees, who died in an accident during a race at Brands Hatch.

The series folded in 2012.

==== MotorSport Vision Formula Three Cup ====
F3 Cup is a national motor racing series that takes place primarily in the United Kingdom with a small number of events in mainland Europe. It is a junior-level feeder formula that uses small single seater Formula Three cars built after 1980 and before 2007. The championship comprises nine rounds, each with two races. Each race weekend comprised one 25-minute qualifying session and two 20-minute races.

The 2011 season saw rounds held in England at Snetterton 300 (two rounds), Donington Park, Brands Hatch Indy, Brands Hatch GP and Oulton Park International. There is one round held in Wales at Anglesey Circuit International and one round in Belgium at Spa Francorchamps. A test drive of a Formula 2 was awarded to the most meritorious driver of the year, which was Aaron Steele.

In 2012, F3 Cup was awarded championship status. There is also a team championship for MSA Entrants fielding two or more cars.
