= 2007 Spanish Formula Three Championship =

Motor racing competition

Seasons
- ← 2006 2008 →

The 2007 Spanish Formula Three Championship was the seventh Spanish Formula Three Championship season. It commenced on March 31, 2007 and ended on November 11 after sixteen races, with Spanish driver Máximo Cortés crowned champion.

== Teams and drivers ==
- All cars are powered by Fiat engines and Dunlop tyres. Main class powered by Dallara F306, while Copa Class by Dallara F300 chassis. Guest drivers in italics.

Team	No	Driver	Rounds
Class A
(Spain) Escuderia TEC-Auto	1	(Spain) Máximo Cortés	All
(Spain) Escuderia TEC-Auto	2	(Spain) Marco Barba	All
(Spain) Escuderia TEC-Auto	3	(Andorra) Manuel Cerqueda Jr.	All
(Spain) Escuderia TEC-Auto	16	(Spain) Marcos Martínez	4–5
(Spain) Escuderia TEC-Auto	16	(Spain) Carlos Cosidó	6
(Spain) Escuderia TEC-Auto	16	(Portugal) Fracisco Villar	7–8
(Spain) Campos F3 Racing	4	(France) Nicolas Prost	All
(Spain) Campos F3 Racing	5	(Spain) Adrián Campos Jr.	All
(Spain) Campos F3 Racing	6	(Spain) Manuel Sáez-Merino, Jr.	All
(Spain) Campos F3 Racing	7	(Spain) Germán Sánchez	All
(Spain) GTA Motor Competición	8	(Spain) Siso Cunill	All
(Spain) GTA Motor Competición	9	(Spain) Víctor García	All
(Spain) GTA Motor Competición	10	(Spain) Juan Ramón Zapata	1–2
(Spain) GTA Motor Competición	46	(Spain) Juan Ramón Zapata	3–8
(Spain) Cetea Sport	11	(Spain) Nil Montserrat	All
(Spain) Cetea Sport	12	(Spain) Toni Rubiejo	All
(Spain) Llusiá Racing	14	(Spain) Himar Acosta	1–6
(Spain) Novo Team	16	(Spain) Marcos Martínez	1–3
(Spain) Novo Team	17	(Spain) Carlos Cosidó	1–5
(Spain) Novo Team	17	(Spain) Roberto Merhi	6
(Spain) Novo Team	17	(Spain) Arturo Llobell	8
(Spain) emiliodevillota.com	18	(Spain) Bruno Méndez	All
(United Kingdom) Team West-Tec	28	(South Africa) Sean Petterson	7–8
(Spain) Novatec Racing	44	(Colombia) Gustavo Yacamán	All
Copa F300
(Spain) GTA Motor Competición	25	(Spain) Roc Vives	All
(Spain) Cetea Sport	26	(Spain) Xavi Barrio	All
(Spain) Cetea Sport	27	(Spain) Alan Sicart	1–4
(Spain) Cetea Sport	27	(Spain) Sergio Canamasas	5–8
(United Kingdom) Team West-Tec	28	(United Kingdom) Andy Merrick	4
(United Kingdom) Team West-Tec	28	(South Africa) Sean Petterson	6
(United Kingdom) Team West-Tec	88	(Norway) Christian Ebbesvik	All
(Spain) Novo Team	29	(Peru) Juan Manuel Polar	All
(Spain) Catolan	31	(Spain) Samuel Checa	1–2, 4, 6–8
(Spain) Meycom	35	(Spain) Carmen Jordá	All
(Spain) Llusiá Racing	36	(Spain) Alan Sicart	5–8
(Spain) Escuela Española de Pilotos	37	(Portugal) Francisco Villar	6
(Spain) Skualo Competición	38	(Spain) Víctor Valiente	8

== Calendar ==
Round		Circuit	Date	Pole position	Fastest lap	Winning driver	Winning team	Copa Winner
1	R1	(Spain) Circuito del Jarama, Madrid	31 March	(Spain) Manuel Sáez-Merino, Jr.	(Spain) Máximo Cortés	(Spain) Marco Barba	(Spain) Escuderia TEC-Auto	(Peru) Juan Manuel Polar
1	R2	(Spain) Circuito del Jarama, Madrid	1 April		(Spain) Máximo Cortés	(Spain) Máximo Cortés	(Spain) Escuderia TEC-Auto	(Peru) Juan Manuel Polar
2	R1	(Spain) Circuito de Jerez, Jerez de la Frontera	5 May	(Spain) Germán Sánchez	(Spain) Máximo Cortés	(Spain) Máximo Cortés	(Spain) Escuderia TEC-Auto	(Peru) Juan Manuel Polar
2	R2	(Spain) Circuito de Jerez, Jerez de la Frontera	6 May		(Spain) Marcos Martínez	(Spain) Manuel Sáez-Merino, Jr.	(Spain) Campos F3 Racing	(Norway) Christian Ebbesvik
3	R1	(Portugal) Autódromo do Estoril, Estoril	26 May	(Spain) Máximo Cortés	(Spain) Máximo Cortés	(Spain) Máximo Cortés	(Spain) Escuderia TEC-Auto	(Norway) Christian Ebbesvik
3	R2	(Portugal) Autódromo do Estoril, Estoril	27 May		(Spain) Máximo Cortés	(Spain) Máximo Cortés	(Spain) Escuderia TEC-Auto	(Norway) Christian Ebbesvik
4	R1	(Spain) Circuito de Albacete, Albacete	23 June	(Spain) Máximo Cortés	(Spain) Máximo Cortés	(Spain) Máximo Cortés	(Spain) Escuderia TEC-Auto	(Peru) Juan Manuel Polar
4	R2	(Spain) Circuito de Albacete, Albacete	24 June		(Spain) Himar Acosta	(Spain) Germán Sánchez	(Spain) Campos F3 Racing	(Norway) Christian Ebbesvik
5	R1	(France) Circuit de Nevers Magny-Cours, Magny-Cours	14 July	(France) Nicolas Prost	(France) Nicolas Prost	(Spain) Marco Barba	(Spain) Escuderia TEC-Auto	(Peru) Juan Manuel Polar
5	R2	(France) Circuit de Nevers Magny-Cours, Magny-Cours	15 July		(Spain) Germán Sánchez	(Spain) Máximo Cortés	(Spain) Escuderia TEC-Auto	(Spain) Xavi Barrio
6	R1	(Spain) Circuit Ricardo Tormo, Valencia	29 September	(Spain) Máximo Cortés	(Spain) Himar Acosta	(Spain) Marco Barba	(Spain) Escuderia TEC-Auto	(Spain) Samuel Checa
6	R2	(Spain) Circuit Ricardo Tormo, Valencia	30 September		(Spain) Máximo Cortés	(France) Nicolas Prost	(Spain) Campos F3 Racing	(Peru) Juan Manuel Polar
7	R1	(Spain) Circuito de Jerez, Jerez de la Frontera	27 October	(Spain) Germán Sánchez	(Spain) Germán Sánchez	(Spain) Germán Sánchez	(Spain) Campos F3 Racing	(Norway) Christian Ebbesvik
7	R2	(Spain) Circuito de Jerez, Jerez de la Frontera	28 October		(Spain) Máximo Cortés	(Colombia) Gustavo Yacamán	(Spain) Novatec Racing	(Norway) Christian Ebbesvik
8	R1	(Spain) Circuit de Catalunya, Barcelona	10 November	(Spain) Máximo Cortés	(Spain) Manuel Sáez-Merino, Jr.	(Spain) Manuel Sáez-Merino, Jr.	(Spain) Campos F3 Racing	(Peru) Juan Manuel Polar
8	R2	(Spain) Circuit de Catalunya, Barcelona	11 November		(Spain) Máximo Cortés	(France) Nicolas Prost	(Spain) Campos F3 Racing	(Norway) Christian Ebbesvik

== Standings ==
=== Class A ===
- Points are awarded as follows:

	1	2	3	4	5	6	7	8	9	PP
Race 1	13	11	9	6	5	4	3	2	1	1
Race 2	12	10	8	6	5	4	3	2	1	0

- The starting grid of the second race will be based on the obtained results of the first race, but the order of the first six classified may be changed, their positions will be permuted.

Pos	Driver	JAR (Spain)		JER (Spain)		EST (Portugal)		ALB (Spain)		MAG (France)		VAL (Spain)		JER (Spain)		CAT (Spain)		Pts
1	(Spain) Máximo Cortés	2	1	1	3	1	1	1	10	4	1	Ret	3	7	16	DSQ	8	117
2	(Spain) Marco Barba	1	11	2	5	2	2	2	2	1	5	1	Ret	3	8	Ret	18	113
3	(France) Nicolas Prost	13	6	4	7	3	5	4	4	6	2	3	1	2	Ret	6	1	102
4	(Spain) Germán Sánchez	4	9	3	4	4	8	6	1	NC	9	11	7	1	19	7	3	76
5	(Andorra) Manuel Cerqueda, Jr.	5	2	9	11	10	9	3	5	2	7	4	8	5	3	Ret	10	66
6	(Spain) Manuel Sáez-Merino, Jr.	10	Ret	6	1	11	7	15	11	3	4	7	Ret	Ret	5	1	2	66
7	(Spain) Bruno Méndez	7	5	7	6	5	3	8	8	Ret	Ret	6	12	4	2	Ret	5	57
8	(Colombia) Gustavo Yacamán	11	Ret	Ret	16	6	4	DSQ	7	8	Ret	5	Ret	6	1	2	20	47
9	(Spain) Himar Acosta	3	Ret	5	2	16	13	5	3	Ret	10	8	5					44
10	(Spain) Adrián Campos Jr.	8	20	8	8	Ret	DNS	7	6	DNS	11	2	2	15	6	11	6	42
11	(Spain) Nil Montserrat	12	8	10	10	7	6	13	19	9	Ret	12	4	8	4	Ret	DNS	24
12	(Spain) Víctor García	6	3	Ret	14	9	14	9	18	Ret	15	Ret	9	16	10	4	7	24
13	(Spain) Marcos Martínez	9	4	Ret	9	19	Ret	20	9	5	3							22
14	(Spain) Siso Cunill	Ret	7	12	Ret	13	17	Ret	20	7	6	16	Ret	Ret	Ret	3	19	19
15	(Spain) Toni Rubiejo	14	15	13	12	14	18	11	12	10	8	10	17	Ret	15	5	4	13
16	(Norway) Christian Ebbesvik	Ret	12	14	13	8	10	14	13	Ret	13	13	DNS	9	7	9	11	7
17	(Spain) Roberto Merhi											Ret	6					4
18	(Peru) Juan Manuel Polar	15	10	11	17	12	12	10	14	11	14	14	10	Ret	13	8	14	2
19	(South Africa) Sean Petterson											17	15	10	9	12	9	2
20	(Spain) Samuel Checa	17	14	18	Ret			19	DNS			9	14	12	14	16	13	1
	(Spain) Carlos Cosidó	16	13	Ret	15	18	15	12	Ret	15	Ret	15	13					0
	(Spain) Carmen Jordá	DNS	17	17	19	21	16	16	17	13	16	Ret	Ret	Ret	12	14	15	0
	(Spain) Xavi Barrio	18	18	15	18	15	11	Ret	15	12	12	Ret	11	Ret	11	19	12	0
	(Spain) Alan Sicart	19	16	20	21	22	20	18	DNS	17	19	Ret	16	14	18	18	DNS	0
	(Spain) Juan Ramón Zapata	20	21	19	20	20	21	17	Ret	16	18	Ret	18†	13	17	17	DNS	0
	(Spain) Roc Vives	Ret	19	16	22	17	19	Ret	16	14	17	DNS	DNS	Ret	20	15	16	0
	(Spain) Sergio Canamasas									Ret	20	18	Ret	Ret	Ret	13	Ret	0
	(United Kingdom) Andy Meyrick							DNS	DNS									0
guest drivers ineligible for points
	(Portugal) Francisco Villar											Ret	Ret	11	21	10	Ret	0
	(Spain) Víctor Valiente															Ret	17	0
	(Spain) Arturo Llobell															Ret	DNS	0
Pos	Driver	JAR (Spain)		JER (Spain)		EST (Portugal)		ALB (Spain)		MAG (France)		VAL (Spain)		JER (Spain)		CAT (Spain)		Pts

Colour	Result
Gold	Winner
Silver	Second place
Bronze	Third place
Green	Points classification
Blue	Non-points classification
Blue	Non-classified finish (NC)
Purple	Retired, not classified (Ret)
Red	Did not qualify (DNQ)
Red	Did not pre-qualify (DNPQ)
Black	Disqualified (DSQ)
White	Did not start (DNS)
White	Withdrew (WD)
White	Race cancelled (C)
Blank	Did not practice (DNP)
Blank	Did not arrive (DNA)
Blank	Excluded (EX)

=== Copa F300 ===
- Points are awarded for both races as follows:

Pos	1	2	3	4	5
Points	10	8	6	4	3

Pos	Driver	JAR (Spain)		JER (Spain)		EST (Portugal)		ALB (Spain)		MAG (France)		VAL (Spain)		JER (Spain)		CAT (Spain)		Pts
1	(Norway) Christian Ebbesvik	Ret	2	2	1	1	1	2	1	Ret	2	2	Ret	1	1	2	1	118
2	(Peru) Juan Manuel Polar	1	1	1	2	2	3	1	2	1	3	3	1	Ret	4	1	4	118
3	(Spain) Xavi Barrio	3	6	3	3	3	2	Ret	3	2	1	Ret	2	Ret	2	8	2	80
4	(Spain) Carmen Jordá	DNS	5	5	4	5	4	3	5	3	4	Ret	Ret	Ret	3	4	5	50
5	(Spain) Samuel Checa	2	3	6	7			5	DNS			1	3	2	5	6	3	44
6	(Spain) Roc Vives	Ret	7	4	6	4	5	Ret	4	4	5	DNS	DNS	Ret	7	5	6	28
7	(Spain) Alan Sicart	4	4	7	5	6	6	4	DNS	5	6	Ret	5	3	6	7	DNS	27
8	(Spain) Sergio Canamasas									Ret	7	5	Ret	Ret	Ret	3	Ret	9
9	(South Africa) Sean Petterson											4	4					8
	(United Kingdom) Andy Meyrick							DNS	DNS									0
guest drivers ineligible for points
	(Spain) Víctor Valiente															Ret	7	0
	(Portugal) Francisco Villar											Ret	Ret					0
Pos	Driver	JAR (Spain)		JER (Spain)		EST (Portugal)		ALB (Spain)		MAG (France)		VAL (Spain)		JER (Spain)		CAT (Spain)		Pts

Colour	Result
Gold	Winner
Silver	Second place
Bronze	Third place
Green	Points classification
Blue	Non-points classification
Blue	Non-classified finish (NC)
Purple	Retired, not classified (Ret)
Red	Did not qualify (DNQ)
Red	Did not pre-qualify (DNPQ)
Black	Disqualified (DSQ)
White	Did not start (DNS)
White	Withdrew (WD)
White	Race cancelled (C)
Blank	Did not practice (DNP)
Blank	Did not arrive (DNA)
Blank	Excluded (EX)

=== Team Standings ===
Pos	Team	Pts
1	(Spain) Escuderia TEC-Auto	197
2	(Spain) Campos F3 Racing	167
3	(Spain) Llusiá Racing	30
4	(Spain) GTA Motor Competición	28
5	(Spain) emiliodevillota.com	28
6	(Spain) Novatec Racing	25
7	(Spain) Cetea Sport	17
8	(Spain) Novo Team	4
9	(United Kingdom) Team West-Tec	2
	(Spain) Meycom	0
	(Spain) Catolan	0
