= 2006 Spanish Formula Three Championship =

Motor racing competition

Seasons
- ← 2005 2007 →

The 2006 Spanish Formula Three Championship was the sixth Spanish Formula Three season. It began on 8 April at Circuit Ricardo Tormo in Valencia and ended on 12 November at Circuito del Jarama in Montmeló after sixteen races. Ricardo Risatti was crowned series champion.

== Teams and drivers ==
- All teams were Spanish-registered. All cars were powered by Toyota engines and Dunlop tyres. Main class powered by Dallara F305, while Copa Class by Dallara F300 chassis.

Team	No.	Driver	Rounds
Class A
Racing Engineering	1	(Spain) Marcos Martínez	1–7
Racing Engineering	1	(Spain) Javier Villa	8
Racing Engineering	2	(France) Nicolas Prost	All
Racing Engineering	3	(Spain) Miguel Molina	All
Racing Engineering	4	(Brazil) Sérgio Jimenez	All
Campos Racing	5	(Spain) Marco Barba	All
Campos Racing	6	(Spain) Roldán Rodríguez	All
Llusiá Racing	7	(Belgium) Nico Verdonck	1
Llusiá Racing	7	(Spain) Iago Rego	6–7
Llusiá Racing	7	(Spain) Himar Acosta	8
GTA Motor Competición	8	(Andorra) Manel Cerqueda Jr.	All
GTA Motor Competición	9	(Spain) Manuel Sáez-Merino Jr.	1–6
GTA Motor Competición	10	(Spain) Arturo Llobell	All
Elide Racing	11	(Brazil) Carlos Iaconelli	1–3
Elide Racing	11	(Colombia) Gustavo Yacamán	5–6
Elide Racing	11	(Spain) Alejandro Núñez	7–8
Elide Racing	15	(Spain) Nil Montserrat	All
Tec-Auto	13	(Spain) Máximo Cortés	All
Tec-Auto	14	(Argentina) Ricardo Risatti	All
RSC Sport	16	(Spain) Aleix Alcaraz	7
Copa F300
Racing Engineering	14	(Spain) Javier Villa	2
Escuela Profiltek	17	(Spain) Adrián Campos Jr.	All
Escuela Profiltek	18	(Spain) Germán Sánchez	All
Escuela Profiltek	33	(Spain) Carmen Jordá	6
ECA Racing	19	(Peru) Juan Manuel Polar	All
ECA Racing	20	(Argentina) Ignacio Char	1–3
ECA Racing	20	(Spain) Víctor García	7–8
Porfesa Competición	22	(Spain) Roberto Merhi	6
Tec-Auto	24	(Spain) Iago Rego	1–5
Tec-Auto	24	(Spain) Alby Ramírez	6
Tec-Auto	25	(Spain) Carlos Cosidó Jr.	All
Cetea Sport	26	(Spain) Toni Rubiejo	All
Cetea Sport	29	(Spain) Xavi Barrio	8
Logo Automoción	27	(Spain) Germán López Balboa	All
RSC Sport	28	(Spain) José Luís López-Pampló	All
GTA Motor Competición	31	(Spain) Manuel Gutiérrez	6–8
GTA Motor Competición	32	(Spain) Siso Cunill	6–8

== Calendar ==
Round		Circuit	Date	Pole position	Fastest lap	Winning driver	Winning team	Copa Winner
1	R1	(Spain) Circuit Ricardo Tormo, Valencia	8 April	(Argentina) Ricardo Risatti	(Spain) Manuel Sáez-Merino Jr.	(Spain) Marco Barba	Campos Racing	(Spain) Adrian Campos Jr.
1	R2	(Spain) Circuit Ricardo Tormo, Valencia	9 April		(Spain) Roldán Rodríguez	(Spain) Marcos Martínez	Racing Engineering	(Spain) Germán Sánchez
2	R1	(France) Circuit de Nevers Magny-Cours, Magny-Cours	29 April	(Argentina) Ricardo Risatti	(Argentina) Ricardo Risatti	(Argentina) Ricardo Risatti	TEC-Auto	(Spain) Javier Villa
2	R2	(France) Circuit de Nevers Magny-Cours, Magny-Cours	30 April		(Argentina) Ricardo Risatti	(Spain) Máximo Cortés	TEC-Auto	(Spain) Javier Villa
3	R1	(Spain) Circuito del Jarama, Madrid	20 May	(Spain) Máximo Cortés	(Argentina) Ricardo Risatti	(Brazil) Sérgio Jimenez	Racing Engineering	(Spain) Germán Sánchez
3	R2	(Spain) Circuito del Jarama, Madrid	21 May		(Spain) Máximo Cortés	(Argentina) Ricardo Risatti	TEC-Auto	(Peru) Juan Manuel Polar
4	R1	(Portugal) Autódromo do Estoril, Estoril	24 June	(Brazil) Sérgio Jimenez	(Argentina) Ricardo Risatti	(Spain) Máximo Cortés	TEC-Auto	(Spain) Germán Sánchez
4	R2	(Portugal) Autódromo do Estoril, Estoril	25 June		(Argentina) Ricardo Risatti	(Spain) Roldán Rodríguez	Campos Racing	(Spain) Germán Sánchez
5	R1	(Spain) Circuito de Albacete, Albacete	2 September	(Spain) Roldán Rodríguez	(Spain) Roldán Rodríguez	(Spain) Roldán Rodríguez	Campos Racing	(Spain) Germán Sánchez
5	R2	(Spain) Circuito de Albacete, Albacete	3 September		(Argentina) Ricardo Risatti	(Argentina) Ricardo Risatti	TEC-Auto	(Spain) Adrian Campos Jr.
6	R1	(Spain) Circuit Ricardo Tormo, Valencia	7 October	(Argentina) Ricardo Risatti	(Argentina) Ricardo Risatti	(Argentina) Ricardo Risatti	TEC-Auto	(Spain) Germán Sánchez
6	R2	(Spain) Circuit Ricardo Tormo, Valencia	8 October		(Spain) Roldán Rodríguez	(Spain) Roldán Rodríguez	Campos Racing	(Spain) Germán Sánchez
7	R1	(Spain) Circuito de Jerez, Jerez de la Frontera	21 October	(Spain) Roldán Rodríguez	(Argentina) Ricardo Risatti	(Spain) Roldán Rodríguez	Campos Racing	(Peru) Juan Manuel Polar
7	R2	(Spain) Circuito de Jerez, Jerez de la Frontera	22 October		(Spain) Máximo Cortés	(Argentina) Ricardo Risatti	TEC-Auto	(Peru) Juan Manuel Polar
8	R1	(Spain) Circuit de Catalunya, Barcelona	11 November	(Spain) Máximo Cortés	(Spain) Máximo Cortés	(France) Nicolas Prost	Racing Engineering	(Peru) Juan Manuel Polar
8	R2	(Spain) Circuit de Catalunya, Barcelona	12 November		(Brazil) Sérgio Jimenez	(Spain) Miguel Molina	Racing Engineering	(Spain) Adrian Campos Jr.

== Standings ==
=== Drivers' standings ===
- Points were awarded as follows:

1	2	3	4	5	6	7	8	9	FL
12	10	8	6	5	4	3	2	1	1

Pos	Driver	VAL (Spain)		MAG (France)		JAR (Spain)		EST (Portugal)		ALB (Spain)		VAL (Spain)		JER (Spain)		CAT (Spain)		Pts
1	(Argentina) Ricardo Risatti	**Ret**	6	**1**	3	2	1	18	5	5	1	**1**	9	5	1	7	4	118
2	(Spain) Roldán Rodríguez	2	11	9	5	5	16	4	1	**1**	7	4	1	**1**	7	4	6	103
3	(Spain) Máximo Cortés	9	8	5	1	**15**	5	1	4	7	5	2	2	2	3	**13**	Ret	93
4	(France) Nicolas Prost	4	4	3	4	Ret	10	2	9	Ret	12	6	3	3	5	1	5	83
5	(Brazil) Sérgio Jimenez	7	5	4	6	1	2	**16**	10	10	3	3	4	Ret	DNS	14	3	74
6	(Spain) Miguel Molina	19	10	11	DNS	13	3	3	3	4	2	8	5	Ret	10	3	1	69
7	(Spain) Marco Barba	1	3	6	11	14	13	5	2	2	14	Ret	10	6	2	DNS	7	67
8	(Spain) Arturo Llobell	8	13	8	Ret	Ret	11	9	17	3	4	19	8	7	4	5	2	47
9	(Spain) Nil Montserrat	13	7	10	8	Ret	Ret	8	8	Ret	8	5	6	4	6	Ret	8	34
10	(Spain) Marcos Martínez	6	1	12	7	Ret	8	14	19	Ret	9	7	7	Ret	Ret			29
11	(Spain) Manuel Sáez-Merino Jr.	3	Ret	14	10	3	4	17	11	12	10	Ret	DNS					24
12	(Brazil) Carlos Iaconelli	5	2	Ret	9	4	DNS											23
13	(Spain) Germán Sánchez	16	14	16	14	6	7	7	6	6	15	9	11	Ret	DNS	15	Ret	19
14	(Andorra) Manel Cerqueda Jr.	12	12	17	12	Ret	9	6	7	13	11	Ret	13	8	8	Ret	15	16
15	(Peru) Juan Manuel Polar	14	Ret	13	13	9	6	Ret	15	Ret	17	10	Ret	9	9	8	13	11
16	(Colombia) Gustavo Yacamán									8	6	Ret	12					6
17	(Spain) Adrian Campos Jr.	11	DSQ	15	16	DNS	15	Ret	12	9	13	DNS	16	10	11	9	10	5
18	(Spain) Toni Rubiejo	15	15	Ret	17	7	12	13	13	11	16	11	14	12	14	DNS	12	3
19	(Spain) Iago Rego	Ret	18	19	19	8	Ret	11	Ret	Ret	Ret	15	20	11	12			3
20	(Spain) José Luís López-Pampló	18	Ret	17	Ret	11	Ret	10	16	Ret	18	Ret	Ret	13	Ret	11	16	2
21	(Belgium) Nico Verdonck	10	9															1
	(Spain) Carlos Cosidó Jr.	Ret	17	Ret	15	10	14	12	14	Ret	19	12	Ret	15	Ret	16	19	0
	(Spain) Germán López Balboa	17	19	18	20	12	17	15	18	DNS	Ret	13	15	Ret	17	17	14	0
	(Argentina) Ignacio Char	Ret	16	20	18	18	DNS											0
guest drivers ineligible for points
	(Spain) Javier Villa			2	2											2	18	0
	(Spain) Himar Acosta															6	17	0
	(Spain) Manuel Gutiérrez													Ret	DNS	Ret	9	0
	(Spain) Siso Cunill											Ret	21	14	13	10	11	0
	(Spain) Víctor García													17	16	12	Ret	0
	(Spain) Aleix Alcaraz													16	15			0
	(Spain) Alejandro Núñez											16	19	Ret	Ret	DNS	Ret	0
	(Spain) Alby Ramírez											17	Ret					0
	(Spain) Carmen Jordá											18	18					0
Pos	Driver	VAL (Spain)		MAG (France)		JAR (Spain)		EST (Portugal)		ALB (Spain)		VAL (Spain)		JER (Spain)		CAT (Spain)		Pts

Colour	Result
Gold	Winner
Silver	Second place
Bronze	Third place
Green	Points classification
Blue	Non-points classification
Blue	Non-classified finish (NC)
Purple	Retired, not classified (Ret)
Red	Did not qualify (DNQ)
Red	Did not pre-qualify (DNPQ)
Black	Disqualified (DSQ)
White	Did not start (DNS)
White	Withdrew (WD)
White	Race cancelled (C)
Blank	Did not practice (DNP)
Blank	Did not arrive (DNA)
Blank	Excluded (EX)

**Bold** – Pole
Italics – Fastest Lap

=== Copa de España de F3 ===
Pos	Driver	Pts
1	(Spain) Germán Sánchez	108
2	(Peru) Juan Manuel Polar	93
3	(Spain) Adrián Campos Jr.	89
4	(Spain) Toni Rubiejo	84
5	(Spain) Caros Cosidó	32
6	(Spain) José Luis López-Pampló	28
7	(Spain) Germán López Balboa	22
8	(Spain) Iago Rego	15
9	(Spain) Siso Cunill	9
10	(Argentina) Ignacio Char	6

=== Teams' standings ===
Pos	Team	Pts
1	Racing Engineering	155
2	TEC-Auto	146
3	Campos Racing	115
4	GTA Motor Competición	42
5	Elide Racing	22
6	Llusiá Racing	0
7	Escuela Profiltek	0
8	ECA Racing	0
9	Cetea Sport	0
10	RSC Sport	0
11	Logo Automoción	0
12	Cetea Sport	0

=== Trofeo Ibérico de Fórmula 3 ===
Pos	Driver	Pts
1	(Spain) Roldán Rodríguez	65
2	(Spain) Miguel Molina	59
3	(Spain) Máximo Cortés	50
4	(Spain) Marco Barba	42
5	(Spain) Arturo Llobell	36
6	(Spain) Nil Montserrat	25
7	(Spain) Manuel Sáez-Merino Jr.	24
8	(Andorra) Manel Cerqueda Jr.	21
9	(Spain) Germán Sánchez	18
10	(Spain) Adrián Campos Jr.	15
