= Víctor García (racing driver) =

Spanish racing driver

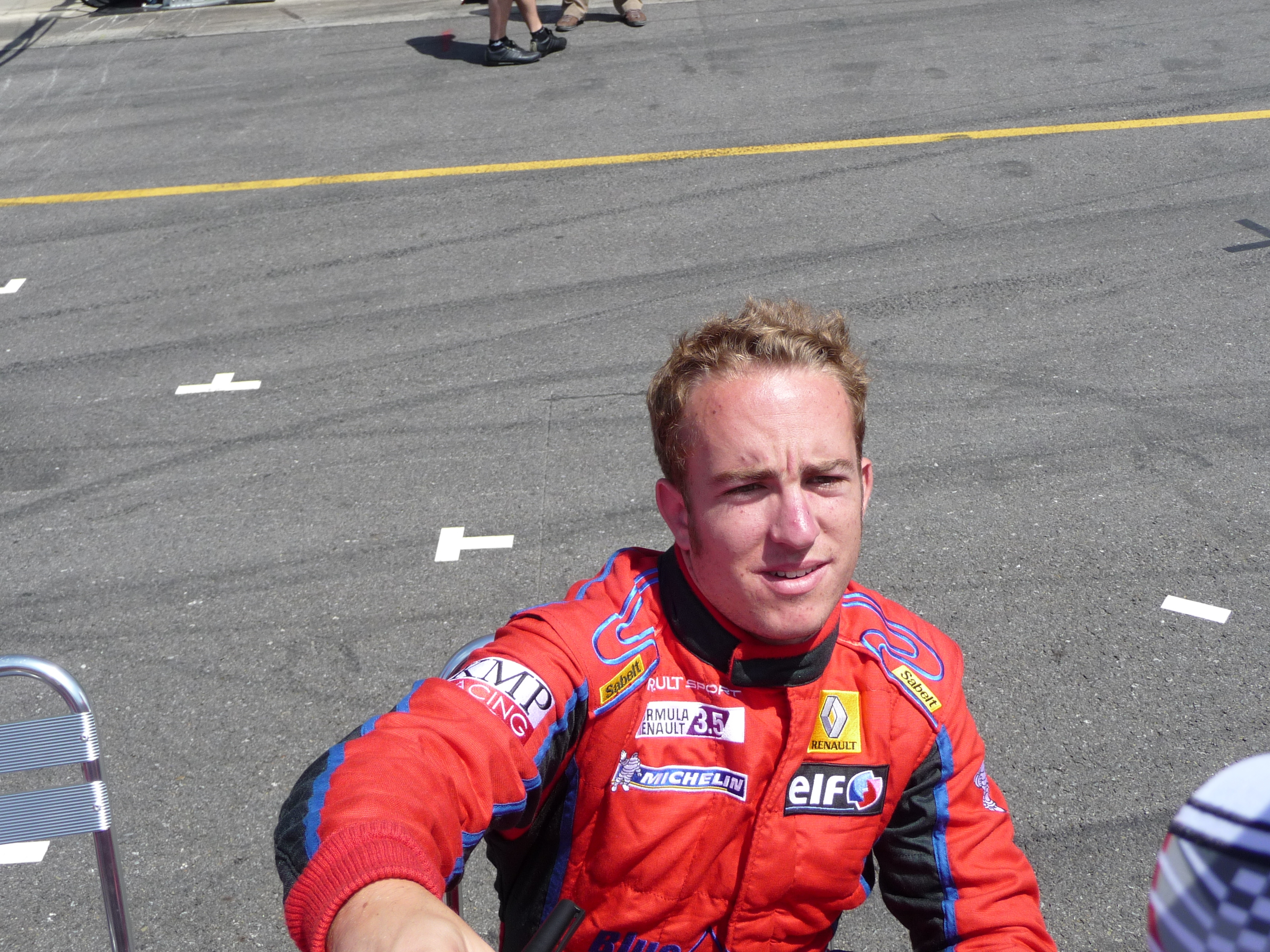
- Víctor García giving autographs at the 2010 Brno World Series by Renault
- Nationality: (Spain) Spanish
- Born: 10 March 1990 (age 36) Madrid, Spain

Firestone Indy Lights career
- Debut season: 2011
- Current team: Team Moore Racing
- Categorisation: FIA Silver
- Car number: 22
- Starts: 4
- Wins: 1
- Poles: 1
- Fastest laps: 1

Previous series
- 2010 2009 2009 2008 2006–08: Formula Renault 3.5 Series; Formula Three Euroseries; British Formula 3 Eurocup Formula Renault 2.0; Spanish Formula Three

Víctor García (born 10 March 1990 in Madrid) is a Spanish former professional racing driver.

== Career ==
=== Karting ===
García began his karting career in the late 1990s, starting out in the cadet ranks before working his way up to Spanish and European Championship ICA status. The highlight of his career came in 2003 when he won both the Spanish Yamaha and Valencia District Yamaha championships.

=== Formula Three ===
García made his single-seater debut in late 2006, racing in the final four races of the Spanish Formula Three Championship season in the secondary Copa F300 class. The following year he raced a full season in the main Class A, driving for the GTA Motor Competición team. He finished the season in eleventh place, taking a podium place at the first round in Jarama as well as six other points-scoring positions.

2008 saw García remain in the series for a second full season, racing for Escuderia TEC-Auto, who had won the title the previous season with Máximo Cortés. Two podiums at the first round at Jarama saw García lead the championship early on, but his results began to fade and he switched teams mid-season, joining Italian outfit RP Motorsport for the final four rounds. He eventually finished the season in 15th place.

García remained in Formula Three for 2009, this time switching to the British series with Fortec Motorsport. He finished in the points on nine occasions to finish 14th in the standings. Despite finishing seventh in the first race at Spa-Francorchamps, he was classified in third position due to a number of guest drivers finishing ahead of him, who were ineligible for championship points.

During the year, García also took part in the two famous non-championship Formula Three races, the Masters of Formula Three at Zandvoort, where he took 22nd place, and the Macau Grand Prix, where he finished eleventh, the second highest British series runner behind Renger van der Zande.

In October 2009, García made his debut in the final Formula Three Euroseries round of the season at Hockenheim with Prema Powerteam. He finished the first race in ninth, just missing out on the reverse-grid pole position for the second race, in which he retired.

=== Formula Renault ===
In 2008, García contested a one-off round of the Eurocup Formula Renault 2.0 championship at the Hungaroring. Driving for Prema Powerteam, he finished fifteenth in the first race before retiring from the second event.

=== Formula Renault 3.5 Series ===
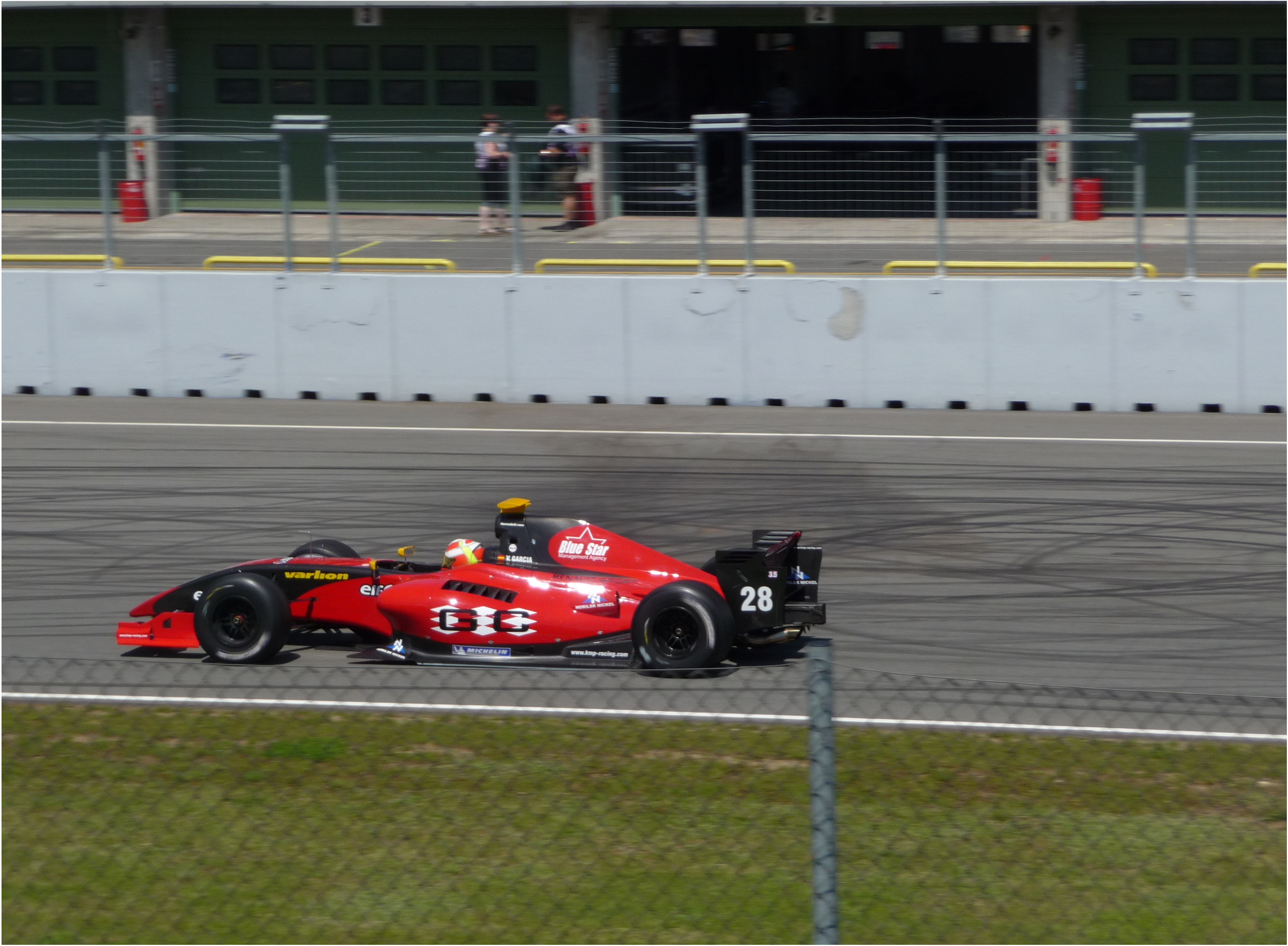
Víctor García in Formula Renault 3.5 Series at the 2nd race of 2010 Brno World Series by Renault

In late 2009, García took part in Formula Renault 3.5 Series collective testing at Motorland Aragón and Barcelona, driving cars for Prema Powerteam, Mofaz Racing and Draco Racing and in February 2010, it was announced that he would drive for new team KMP Racing in the 2010 season, partnering Russian Anton Nebylitskiy. He finished 24th in points with a best finish of eighth in Race 1 at Silverstone Circuit.

=== Indy Lights ===
For 2011, García has signed on to drive in the American Firestone Indy Lights series with Team Moore Racing. He won the second race of the season at Barber Motorsports Park. He was released after the round at Toronto and finished 11th in the standings.

=== Other series ===
In the autumn of 2009, García sampled a GP2 car for the first time, testing for the DPR team at Jerez in Spain.

== Racing record ==
=== Career summary ===
Season	Series	Team	Races	Wins	Poles	F/Laps	Podiums	Points	Position
2006	Spanish Formula 3 Championship	ECA Racing	4	0	0	0	0	0	NC†
2007	Spanish Formula 3 Championship	GTA Motor Competición	16	0	0	0	1	24	12th
2008	Spanish Formula 3 Championship	Escuderia TEC-Auto	9	0	0	0	2	28	15th
2008	Spanish Formula 3 Championship	RP Motorsport	8	0	0	1	0	28	15th
2008	Eurocup Formula Renault 2.0	Prema Powerteam	2	0	0	0	0	0	38th
2009	British Formula 3 International Series	Fortec Motorsport	20	0	0	0	1	30	14th
2009	Masters of Formula 3	Fortec Motorsport	1	0	0	0	0	N/A	22nd
2009	Macau Grand Prix	Fortec Motorsport	1	0	0	0	0	N/A	11th
2009	Formula 3 Euro Series	Prema Powerteam	2	0	0	0	0	0	NC†
2010	Formula Renault 3.5 Series	KMP Racing	17	0	0	0	0	4	24th
2011	Indy Lights	Team Moore Racing	7	1	1	1	2	199	11th
2014	Formula Acceleration 1	Acceleration Team Spain	2	0	0	0	0	5	22nd

- * Season still in progress.

† - As García was a guest driver, he was ineligible to score points.

=== Complete Eurocup Formula Renault 2.0 results ===
(key) (Races in bold indicate pole position; races in italics indicate fastest lap)

Year	Entrant	1	2	3	4	5	6	7	8	9	10	11	12	13	14	DC	Points
2008	Prema Powerteam	SPA; 1	SPA; 2	SIL; 1	SIL; 2	HUN; 1; 15	HUN; 2 Ret	NÜR; 1	NÜR; 2	LMS; 1	LMS; 2	EST; 1	EST; 2	CAT; 1	CAT; 2	38th	0

=== Complete Formula Renault 3.5 Series results ===
(key)

Year	Team	1	2	3	4	5	6	7	8	9	10	11	12	13	14	15	16	17	Pos	Points
2010	KMP Racing	ALC; 1 Ret	ALC; 2; 10	SPA; 1 Ret	SPA; 2 Ret	MON; 1; 12	BRN; 1 Ret	BRN; 2; 20	MAG; 1; 19	MAG; 2; 15	HUN; 1; 12	HUN; 2; 18	HOC; 1 Ret	HOC; 2; 18	SIL; 1; 8	SIL; 2; 21	CAT; 1 Ret	CAT; 2 Ret	24th	4

=== American open–wheel racing results ===
(key) (Races in bold indicate pole position) (Races in italics indicate fastest lap)

==== Indy Lights ====
Year	Team	1	2	3	4	5	6	7	8	9	10	11	12	13	14	Rank	Points	Ref
2011	Team Moore Racing	STP; 15	**ALA**; 1	LBH; 12	INDY; 3	MIL; 10	IOW; 4	TOR; 7	EDM1	EDM2	TRO	NHM	BAL	KTY	LVS	**11th**	**199**	
