= 2008 Spanish Formula Three Championship =

Seasons
- ← 2007 2009 →

The 2008 Spanish Formula Three Championship was the eighth Spanish Formula Three Championship season. It commenced on May 3, 2008 and ended on November 2. The Spanish driver Germán Sánchez was crowned champion, two points ahead of runner-up Nelson Panciatici, who was driving an older 'B-class' car. The title was decided in favour of Sánchez and Natacha Gachnang after the resolution of various claims. Panciatici was disqualified for using duct tape on the wings of the car, a common technique in this championship, which does not influence the behavior of the vehicle or guarantee any improvement according to a press release from Hache Team.

== Teams and drivers ==
- All cars are powered by Fiat engines. Guest drivers in italics.

Team	No	Driver	Chassis	Rounds
Class A
(Spain) Escuderia TEC-Auto	1	(Spain) Bruno Méndez	Dallara F308	All
(Spain) Escuderia TEC-Auto	2	(Spain) Víctor García	Dallara F308	1–5
(Spain) Escuderia TEC-Auto	14	(Colombia) Gustavo Yacamán	Dallara F308	1–7
(Spain) Escuderia TEC-Auto	14	(Spain) Roberto Merhi	Dallara F308	9
(Italy) RP Motorsport	2	(Spain) Víctor García	Dallara F308	6–9
(Italy) RP Motorsport	11	(Italy) Nicola de Marco	Dallara F308	All
(Italy) RP Motorsport	15	(Italy) David Fumanelli	Dallara F308	6–7
(Spain) Campos F3 Racing	3	(Spain) Adrián Campos Jr.	Dallara F308	All
(Spain) Campos F3 Racing	4	(Spain) Germán Sánchez	Dallara F308	All
(Spain) GTA Motor Competición	6	(Spain) Jaime Alguersuari	Dallara F308	1, 4, 6–7
(Spain) GTA Motor Competición	6	(Italy) Edoardo Piscopo	Dallara F308	2
(Spain) GTA Motor Competición	6	(Spain) Roberto Merhi	Dallara F308	5
(Spain) GTA Motor Competición	6	(Argentina) Augusto Scalbi	Dallara F308	9
(Spain) emiliodevillota.com	6	(United Kingdom) Alex Waters	Dallara F308	3
(Spain) emiliodevillota.com	7	(United Kingdom) Will Bratt	Dallara F308	All
(Spain) Novo Team ECA	8	(Spain) José Luis Abadín	Dallara F308	1–6
(Spain) Meycom	9	(Spain) Alejandro Núñez	Dallara F308	1
(Spain) Meycom	9	(Spain) Celso Míguez	Dallara F308	2–9
(Spain) Cetea Sport	10	(Spain) Sergio Canamasas	Dallara F308	1–2, 4–9
(United Kingdom) Team West-Tec	88	(Norway) Christian Ebbesvik	Dallara F308	3–9
Copa F306/300
(Spain) emiliodevillota.com	13	(Colombia) Gustavo Yacamán	Dallara F306	8–9
(Spain) emiliodevillota.com	22	(Spain) Cástor Benítez	Dallara F306	1–3, 5, 7
(Spain) emiliodevillota.com	22	(United Kingdom) Alex Waters	Dallara F306	4
(Spain) emiliodevillota.com	22	(Spain) Máximo Cortés	Dallara F306	6
(Spain) emiliodevillota.com	22	(Spain) Isaac López Navarro	Dallara F306	8–9
(Spain) Escuderia TEC-Auto	16	(Spain) Toño Fernández	Dallara F306	1–8
(Spain) Escuderia TEC-Auto	16	(Spain) Marcos Martínez	Dallara F306	9
(Spain) Campos F3 Racing	17	(Spain) Carmen Jordá	Dallara F306	All
(Spain) Campos F3 Racing	18	(Switzerland) Natacha Gachnang	Dallara F306	All
(United Kingdom) Team West-Tec	19	(United Kingdom) Alex Waters	Dallara F306	1–2
(United Kingdom) Team West-Tec	55	(China) Ma Qinghua	Dallara F306	4–9
(United Kingdom) Team West-Tec	58	(Portugal) Francisco Villar	Dallara F300	1–2
(United Kingdom) Team West-Tec	58	(Portugal) Francisco Villar	Dallara F306	3–9
(United Kingdom) Team West-Tec	85	(United Kingdom) Jonathan Legris	Dallara F300	All
(United Kingdom) Team West-Tec	88	(Norway) Christian Ebbesvik	Dallara F306	1–2
(Spain) GTA Motor Competición	21	(South Africa) Jimmy Auby	Dallara F306	All
(Spain) GTA Motor Competición	27	(Spain) Nil Montserrat	Dallara F306	1–4
(Spain) Novo Team ECA	23	(Spain) José Luis Ituarte	Dallara F306	1–7
(Italy) RP Motorsport	24	(Spain) Xavi Barrio	Dallara F306	1–3
(Italy) RP Motorsport	24	(Argentina) Augusto Scalbi	Dallara F306	4–5
(Italy) RP Motorsport	24	(Italy) Stefano Bizzarri	Dallara F306	6–9
(Spain) Cetea Sport	25	(Spain) Toni Rubiejo	Dallara F306	1–2, 5
(Spain) Sammy & Zoy	26	(Spain) Samuel Checa	Dallara F306	1, 3–5
(Spain) Q8 Oils Hache Team	28	(Spain) José Alonso Liste	Dallara F306	All
(Spain) Q8 Oils Hache Team	29	(France) Nelson Panciatici	Dallara F306	All
(Spain) Q8 Oils Hache Team	30	(Spain) Edgar Fernández	Dallara F306	All
(Spain) Llusiá Racing	31	(Spain) Pedro Quesada	Dallara F306	1–3
(Spain) Llusiá Racing	31	(Spain) Roberto Merhi	Dallara F306	4
(Spain) Llusiá Racing	32	(Spain) Xavi Barrio	Dallara F306	4
(Spain) Llusiá Racing	32	(Guatemala) Richard Campollo	Dallara F306	5
(Spain) Victoria Racing Team Sur	38	(Spain) Miguel Ángel Montes	Dallara F300	1
(Spain) Victoria Racing Team Sur	38	(Spain) Miguel Ángel Montes	Dallara F306	8

== Calendar ==
Round		Circuit	Date	Pole position	Fastest lap	Winning driver	Winning team	Copa Winner
1	R1	(Spain) Circuito del Jarama, Madrid	3 May	(Switzerland) Natacha Gachnang	(Spain) Jaime Alguersuari	(Spain) Jaime Alguersuari	(Spain) GTA Motor Competición	(Switzerland) Natacha Gachnang
1	R2	(Spain) Circuito del Jarama, Madrid	4 May		(Switzerland) Natacha Gachnang	(Spain) Bruno Méndez	(Spain) GTA Motor Competición	(Spain) Nil Montserrat
2	R1	(Belgium) Circuit de Spa-Francorchamps, Spa	31 May	(United Kingdom) Will Bratt	(United Kingdom) Jonathan Legris	(Italy) Nicola de Marco	(Italy) RP Motorsport	(United Kingdom) Jonathan Legris
2	R2	(Belgium) Circuit de Spa-Francorchamps, Spa	1 June		(Spain) Toño Fernández	(Colombia) Gustavo Yacamán	(Spain) Escuderia TEC-Auto	(United Kingdom) Jonathan Legris
3	R1	(Spain) Circuito de Albacete, Albacete	28 June	(Spain) Germán Sánchez	(Spain) Germán Sánchez	(Spain) Germán Sánchez	(Spain) Campos F3 Racing	(France) Nelson Panciatici
3	R2	(Spain) Circuito de Albacete, Albacete	29 June		(Spain) Nil Montserrat	(Italy) Nicola de Marco	(Italy) RP Motorsport	(Spain) Nil Montserrat
4	R1	(Spain) Valencia Street Circuit, Valencia	27 July	(Spain) Jaime Alguersuari	(United Kingdom) Will Bratt	(Spain) Jaime Alguersuari	(Spain) GTA Motor Competición	(Switzerland) Natacha Gachnang
4	R2	(Spain) Valencia Street Circuit, Valencia	27 July		(United Kingdom) Will Bratt	(Spain) Germán Sánchez	(Spain) Campos F3 Racing	(France) Nelson Panciatici
5		(Spain) Valencia Street Circuit, Valencia	24 August	(Norway) Christian Ebbesvik	(Switzerland) Natacha Gachnang	(Norway) Christian Ebbesvik	(United Kingdom) Team West-Tec	(France) Nelson Panciatici
6	R1	(France) Circuit de Nevers Magny-Cours, Magny-Cours	21 September	(Spain) Máximo Cortés	(France) Nelson Panciatici	(Spain) Máximo Cortés	(Spain) Q8 Oils Hache Team	(Spain) Máximo Cortés
6	R2	(France) Circuit de Nevers Magny-Cours, Magny-Cours	21 September		(Spain) Germán Sánchez	(Spain) Germán Sánchez	(Spain) Campos F3 Racing	(France) Nelson Panciatici
7	R1	(Spain) Circuit Ricardo Tormo, Valencia	27 September	(Spain) Jaime Alguersuari	(Spain) Germán Sánchez	(Spain) Jaime Alguersuari	(Spain) GTA Motor Competición	(Switzerland) Natacha Gachnang
7	R2	(Spain) Circuit Ricardo Tormo, Valencia	28 September		(Spain) Germán Sánchez	(Spain) Germán Sánchez	(Spain) Campos F3 Racing	(Switzerland) Natacha Gachnang
8	R1	(Spain) Circuito de Jerez, Jerez de la Frontera	18 October	(Spain) Adrián Campos Jr.	(Spain) Adrián Campos Jr.	(Spain) Adrián Campos Jr.	(Spain) emiliodevillota.com	(United Kingdom) Jonathan Legris
8	R2	(Spain) Circuito de Jerez, Jerez de la Frontera	19 October		(Spain) Víctor García	(Norway) Christian Ebbesvik	(United Kingdom) Team West-Tec	(Switzerland) Natacha Gachnang
9	R1	(Spain) Circuit de Catalunya, Barcelona	1 November	(Spain) Roberto Merhi	(Spain) Roberto Merhi	(Spain) Roberto Merhi	(Spain) Escuderia TEC-Auto	(Italy) Stefano Bizzarri
9	R2	(Spain) Circuit de Catalunya, Barcelona	2 November		(Spain) Roberto Merhi	(Spain) Roberto Merhi	(Spain) Escuderia TEC-Auto	(Spain) Marcos Martínez

== Standings ==
=== Class A ===
- Points are awarded as follows:

	1	2	3	4	5	6	7	8	9	PP
Race 1	13	11	9	6	5	4	3	2	1	**1**
Race 2	12	10	8	6	5	4	3	2	1	0

- The starting grid of the second race will be based on the results of the first race, but the order of the first six classified may be changed.

Pos	Driver	JAR (Spain)		SPA (Belgium)		ALB (Spain)		VSC (Spain)		VF1 (Spain)	MAG (France)		VAL (Spain)		JER (Spain)		CAT (Spain)		Pts
1	(Spain) Germán Sánchez	7	6	19	10	**1**	8	6	1	8	6	1	6	1	4	3	DSQ	Ret	88
2	(France) Nelson Panciatici	11	7	4	3	3	Ret	3	2	2	2	5	9	6	9	14	DSQ	8	84
3	(Switzerland) Natacha Gachnang	**2**	13	12	4	6	4	2	3	9	11	7	2	4	7	5	Ret	11	76
4	(Italy) Nicola de Marco	Ret	Ret	1	5	5	1	4	17	4	4	2	15	9	10	6	7	Ret	74
5	(United Kingdom) Will Bratt	5	4	**3**	24	13	7	12	9	DSQ	10	18	10	7	3	2	3	2	67
6	(Spain) Bruno Méndez	6	1	6	6	2	NC	Ret	Ret	7	Ret	NC	5	2	DSQ	10	5	3	66
7	(Spain) Jaime Alguersuari	1	5					**1**	4		NC	NC	**1**	3					60
8	(Spain) Adrián Campos Jr.	NC	NC	15	13	18	20	Ret	Ret	6	3	3	4	Ret	**1**	4	8	5	58
9	(Colombia) Gustavo Yacamán	10	NC	5	1	7	3	NC	6	20	7	4	7	5	6	DNS	18	9	56
10	(Norway) Christian Ebbesvik	9	Ret	9	8	9	9	13	11	**1**	8	6	12	13	5	1	Ret	6	49
11	(United Kingdom) Jonathan Legris	8	Ret	2	2	10	5	5	Ret	Ret	Ret	13	11	8	2	Ret	11	10	47
12	(Spain) Nil Montserrat	4	3	8	7	4	2	7	Ret										38
13	(Spain) Roberto Merhi							9	18	3							**1**	1	36
14	(Spain) Celso Míguez			13	Ret	8	6	8	14	19	5	19	3	10	Ret	12	2	Ret	35
15	(Spain) Víctor García	3	2	10	11	16	11	21	Ret	5	NC	11	13	15	DSQ	Ret	Ret	7	28
16	(South Africa) Jimmy Auby	22	8	7	9	15	14	DNS	Ret	NC	18	9	8	11	Ret	11	9	12	11
17	(Spain) Toño Fernández	13	9	20	16	Ret	22	11	5	16	NC	14	18	21	15	8			8
18	(China) Ma Qinghua							15	12	12	15	8	22	14	8	7	Ret	14	7
19	(Italy) Stefano Bizzarri										Ret	12	17	12	14	Ret	4	20	6
20	(Spain) José Alonso Liste	Ret	NC	24	17	DNS	16	14	7	10	9	NC	14	16	DNS	13	15	13	5
21	(Argentina) Augusto Scalbi							10	8	17							10	Ret	3
22	(Spain) Carmen Jordá	18	10	22	18	14	12	19	16	NC	14	10	Ret	20	11	9	13	18	1
	(Italy) Edoardo Piscopo			25	22														0
	(Spain) Cástor Benítez	Ret	Ret	17	19	21	17			NC			20	Ret					0
	(Spain) Isaac López Navarro														Ret	18	14	17	0
	(Spain) José Luis Abadín	17	Ret	14	15	22	19	Ret	15	15	13	Ret							0
	(Spain) José Luis Ituarte	14	NC	21	Ret	17	18	20	10	18	Ret	16	19	DNS					0
	(Spain) Alejandro Núñez	16	NC																0
	(Spain) Sergio Canamasas	Ret	DNS	Ret	20			16	19	13	16	Ret	Ret	18	13	15	16	15	0
	(Spain) Toni Rubiejo	12	12	18	14					Ret									0
	(Italy) David Fumanelli										12	17	Ret	DNS					0
	(Spain) Xavi Barrio	Ret	11	16	Ret	23	DSQ	Ret	Ret										0
	(United Kingdom) Alex Waters	Ret	14	11	12	11	10	17	20										0
	(Portugal) Francisco Villar	15	16	DNS	21	12	Ret	Ret	NC	11	17	15	16	19	NC	17	12	19	0
	(Spain) Samuel Checa	19	NC			19	15	18	13	Ret									0
	(Spain) Edgar Fernández	20	NC	Ret	23	Ret	21	Ret	NC	Ret	Ret	21	21	17	12	16	17	16	0
	(Spain) Pedro Quesada	Ret	Ret	23	Ret	20	13												0
	(Guatemala) Richard Campollo									14									0
	(Spain) Miguel Ángel Montes	21	15												Ret	19			0
guest drivers ineligible for points
	(Spain) Máximo Cortés										**1**	20							0
	(Spain) Marcos Martínez																6	4	0
Pos	Driver	JAR (Spain)		SPA (Belgium)		ALB (Spain)		VSC (Spain)		VF1 (Spain)	MAG (France)		VAL (Spain)		JER (Spain)		CAT (Spain)		Pts

Colour	Result
Gold	Winner
Silver	Second place
Bronze	Third place
Green	Points classification
Blue	Non-points classification
Blue	Non-classified finish (NC)
Purple	Retired, not classified (Ret)
Red	Did not qualify (DNQ)
Red	Did not pre-qualify (DNPQ)
Black	Disqualified (DSQ)
White	Did not start (DNS)
White	Withdrew (WD)
White	Race cancelled (C)
Blank	Did not practice (DNP)
Blank	Did not arrive (DNA)
Blank	Excluded (EX)

**Bold** – Pole
Italics – Fastest Lap

=== Copa F306/300 ===
Pos	Driver	JAR (Spain)		SPA (Belgium)		ALB (Spain)		VSC (Spain)		VF1 (Spain)	MAG (France)		VAL (Spain)		JER (Spain)		CAT (Spain)		Pts
1	(Switzerland) Natacha Gachnang	1	8	7	3	3	2	1	2	2	4	2	1	1	3	1	NC	5	110
2	(France) Nelson Panciatici	5	2	2	2	1	NC	2	1	1	2	1	3	2	5	7	DSQ	2	109
3	(United Kingdom) Jonathan Legris	3	Ret	1	1	4	3	3	Ret	Ret	Ret	7	4	3	1	NC	4	4	76
4	(Spain) Nil Montserrat	2	1	4	4	2	1	4	Ret										48
5	(South Africa) Jimmy Auby	14	3	3	6	7	6	DNS	Ret	NC	8	4	2	4	Ret	5	3	6	44
6	(Spain) José Alonso Liste	Ret	NC	15	10	DNS	8	8	4	3	3	NC	5	7	DNS	6	8	7	25
7	(China) Ma Qinghua							9	7	5	6	3	12	6	4	2	Ret	8	24
8	(Spain) Carmen Jordá	10	5	13	11	6	4	12	9	NC	5	5	Ret	10	6	4	6	11	21
9	(Colombia) Gustavo Yacamán														2	DNS	10	3	16
10	(Spain) Toño Fernández	7	4	11	9	Ret	12	7	3	7	NC	8	8	11	9	3			16
11	(Portugal) Francisco Villar	9	11	DNS	13	5	Ret	Ret	NC	4	7	9	6	9	NC	9	5	12	13
12	(Norway) Christian Ebbesvik	4	Ret	5	5														10
13	(Spain) Pedro Quesada	Ret	Ret	14	Ret	10	5												3
14	(Argentina) Augusto Scalbi							6	5	8									3
15	(Italy) Stefano Bizzarri										Ret	6	7	5	8	Ret	1	13	3
16	(Spain) Roberto Merhi							5	10										3
	(Spain) Xavi Barrio	Ret	6	8	Ret	12	DSQ	Ret	Ret										0
	(Spain) Cástor Benítez	Ret	Ret	9	12	11	9			NC			10	Ret					0
	(Spain) Isaac López Navarro														Ret	10	7	10	0
	(Spain) José Luis Ituarte	8	NC	12	NC	8	10	13	6	9	Ret	10	9	DNS					0
	(Spain) Toni Rubiejo	6	7	10	8				NC	Ret									0
	(United Kingdom) Alex Waters	Ret	9	6	7			10	11										0
	(Spain) Samuel Checa	11	NC			9	7	11	8	Ret									0
	(Spain) Edgar Fernández	12	NC	Ret	14	Ret	11	Ret	NC	Ret	Ret	12	11	8	7	8	9	9	0
	(Guatemala) Richard Campollo									6									0
	(Spain) Miguel Ángel Montes	13	10												Ret	11			0
guest drivers ineligible for points
	(Spain) Marcos Martínez																2	1	0
	(Spain) Máximo Cortés										1	11							0
Pos	Driver	JAR (Spain)		SPA (Belgium)		ALB (Spain)		VSC (Spain)		VF1 (Spain)	MAG (France)		VAL (Spain)		JER (Spain)		CAT (Spain)		Pts

Colour	Result
Gold	Winner
Silver	Second place
Bronze	Third place
Green	Points classification
Blue	Non-points classification
Blue	Non-classified finish (NC)
Purple	Retired, not classified (Ret)
Red	Did not qualify (DNQ)
Red	Did not pre-qualify (DNPQ)
Black	Disqualified (DSQ)
White	Did not start (DNS)
White	Withdrew (WD)
White	Race cancelled (C)
Blank	Did not practice (DNP)
Blank	Did not arrive (DNA)
Blank	Excluded (EX)

=== Team Standings ===
Pos	Team	Pts
1	(Spain) Campos F3 Racing	134
2	(Spain) GTA Motor Competición	90
3	(Spain) Q8 Oils Hache Team	68
4	(Spain) emiliodevillota.com	63
5	(Italy) RP Motorsport	59
6	(Spain) Escuderia TEC-Auto	53
7	(United Kingdom) Team West-Tec	35
8	(Spain) Meycom	25
	(Spain) Llusiá Racing	0
	(Spain) Cetea Sport	0
	(Spain) Novo Team ECA	0
	(Spain) Sammy & Zoy	0
	(Spain) Victoria Racing Team Sur	0
