= Bruno Méndez (racing driver) =

Spanish racing driver

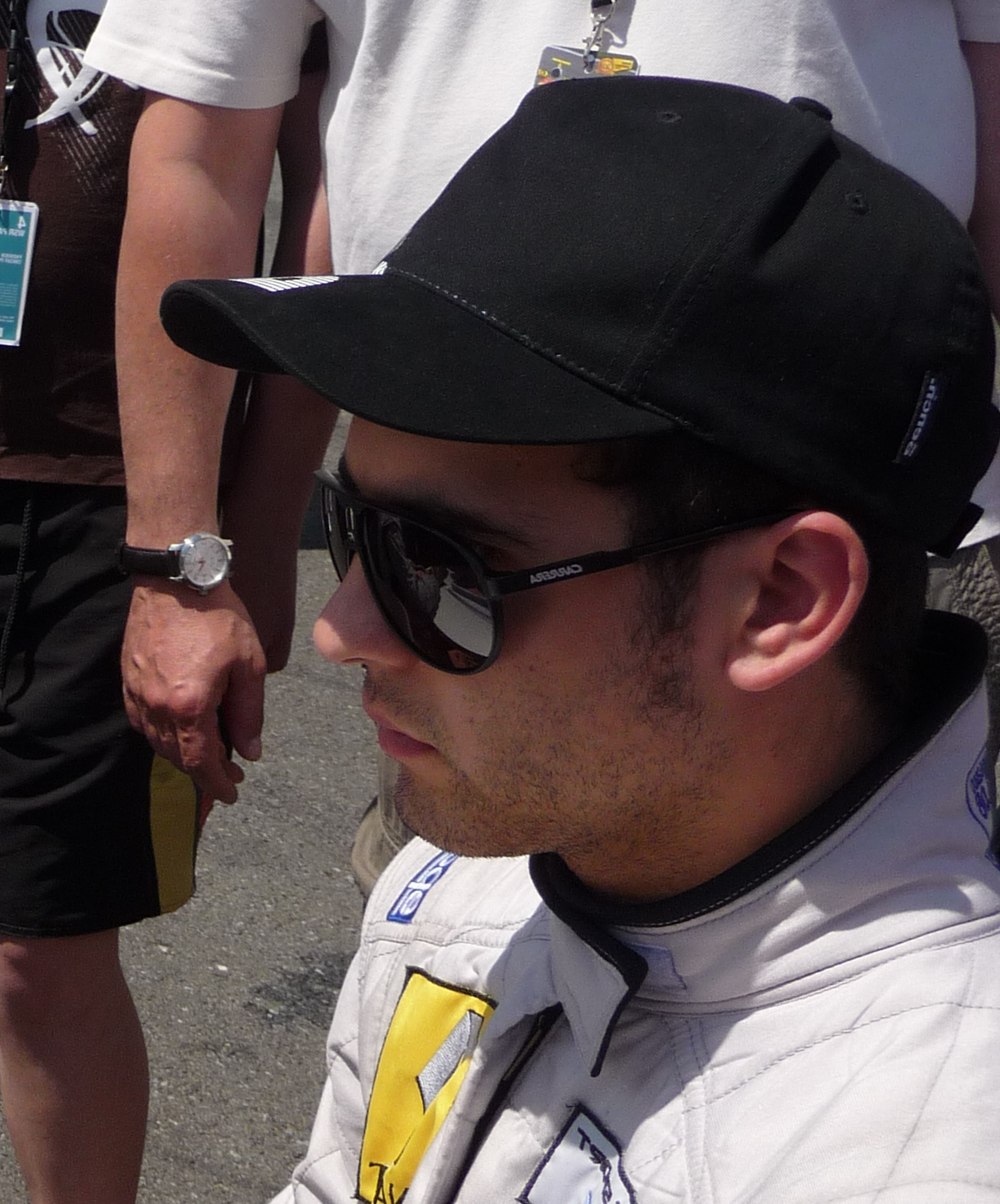
- Méndez giving autographs at the 2010 Brno World Series by Renault meeting
- Nationality: (Spain) Spanish
- Full name: Bruno Méndez López
- Born: 16 April 1990 (age 36) La Roda, Spain

British Formula 3 career
- Debut season: 2011
- Current team: Hitech Racing
- Car number: 27

Previous series
- 2010 2009–10 2009 2008 2007–08 2006: Superleague Formula; Formula Renault 3.5 Series; European F3 Open; Euroseries 3000; Spanish Formula Three; Master Junior Formula

Championship titles
- 2009: European F3 Open

Bruno Méndez López (born 16 April 1990 in La Roda, Asturias) is a Spanish former racing driver.

== Career ==
=== Master Junior Formula ===
After a short karting career, Méndez begun his single–seater career in the Master Junior Formula in 2006, winning six races to finish as series runner–up behind fellow Spaniard Daniel Campos-Hull.

=== Formula Three ===
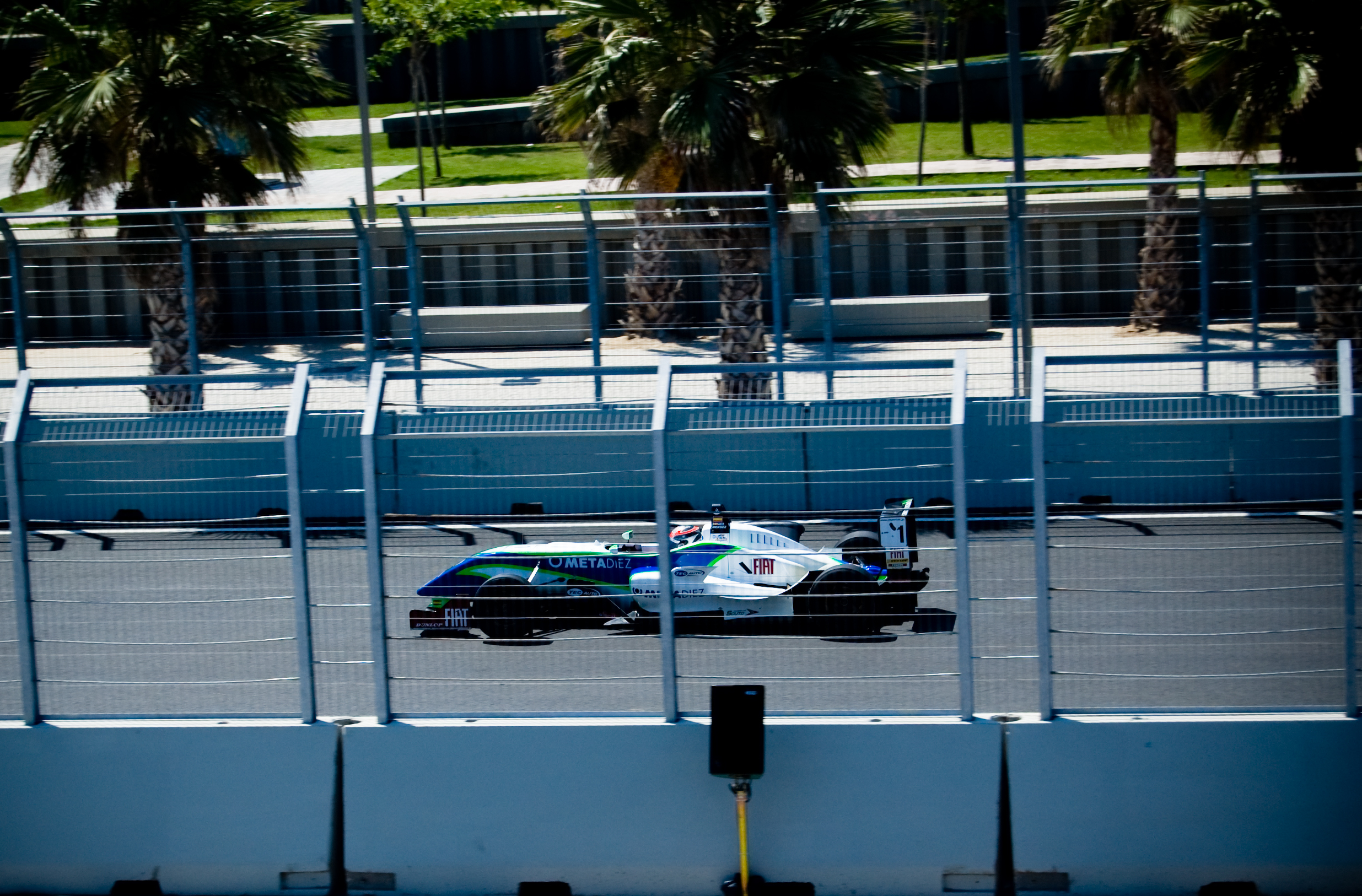
Méndez (TEC Auto) driving a Formula Three car at the Spanish Formula Three round in Valencia

In 2007, Méndez graduated to Formula Three, racing in the Spanish Formula Three Championship for the emiliodevillota.com team. He finished his maiden season seventh in the standings after taking podium places at Estoril and Jerez.

Méndez remained in the series for a second season in 2008, this time switching to the Escuderia TEC-Auto team. After winning at the season–opener in Jarama, he took a further three podiums to be classified in fifth place.

2009 saw Méndez stay in the series, now known as the European F3 Open Championship, for a third season. Driving for Campos Racing, he won four races and took a further seven podiums to win the title by just two points after a season–long duel with countryman Celso Míguez.

2011 saw Méndez return to the category after a year's absence, racing in the British series for Hitech Racing. However, he left the team after a poor first round at Monza where he picked up just one point from the three races.

=== Euroseries 3000 ===
In October 2008, Méndez made his debut in the Euroseries 3000, driving for Bull Racing at Jerez where he finished fourth and sixth in the two races. He missed the next event in Barcelona before appearing at the final round of the season in Magione with the Sighinolfi Autoracing team. A fifth-place finish in the last race of the year saw him classified in 16th place overall with eight points.

=== Formula Renault 3.5 Series ===
In October 2009, Méndez stepped up to the Formula Renault 3.5 Series, joining Esteban Guerrieri at RC Motorsport for the final round of the season at Motorland Aragón.

After taking part in FR3.5 Series winter testing with ISR Racing and Interwetten.com, Méndez signed with the newly named FHV Interwetten.com team to compete in the 2010 season, racing alongside fellow European F3 Open graduate Sergio Canamasas. During the season he took one points finish, a sixth place in a weather–affected race at Magny–Cours, to be classified 23rd in the championship. He was replaced by Salvador Durán for the final round in Barcelona after sustaining an injury during the previous weekends' Superleague Formula round in China.

=== Superleague Formula ===
In October 2010, Méndez made his debut in the Superleague Formula series, replacing the injured María de Villota at Atlético Madrid for the round at the new Ordos International Circuit. He was due to race at the following round in Beijing too, but was replaced by Dutchman Paul Meijer after he fractured his thumb during the second race of the Ordos event.

== Racing record ==
=== Career summary ===
Season	Series	Team	Races	Wins	Poles	F/Laps	Podiums	Points	Position
2006	Master Junior Formula	?	15	6	0	3	10	315	**2nd**
2007	Spanish Formula Three Championship	emiliodevillota.com	16	0	0	0	2	57	7th
2008	Spanish Formula Three Championship	TEC Auto	17	1	0	0	4	67	5th
2008	Euroseries 3000	Bull Racing	4	0	0	0	0	8	16th
2008	Euroseries 3000	Sighinolfi Autoracing	4	0	0	0	0	8	16th
2009	European F3 Open Championship	Campos Racing	16	4	2	8	11	145	**1st**
2009	Formula Renault 3.5 Series	RC Motorsport	2	0	0	0	0	0	39th
2010	Formula Renault 3.5 Series	FHV Interwetten.com	14	0	0	0	0	5	23rd
2010	Superleague Formula	Atlético Madrid	2	0	0	0	0	265†	17th†
2011	British Formula 3 Championship	Hitech Racing	3	0	0	0	0	1	25th

† – Team standings

=== Complete Formula Renault 3.5 Series results ===
(key) (Races in bold indicate pole position) (Races in italics indicate fastest lap)

Year	Team	1	2	3	4	5	6	7	8	9	10	11	12	13	14	15	16	17	Pos	Points
2009	RC Motorsport	CAT; 1	CAT; 2	SPA; 1	SPA; 2	MON; 1	HUN; 1	HUN; 2	SIL; 1	SIL; 2	BUG; 1	BUG; 2	ALG; 1	ALG; 2	NÜR; 1	NÜR; 2	ALC; 1 Ret	ALC; 2; 19	39th	0
2010	FHV Interwetten.com	ALC; 1 Ret	ALC; 2; 15	SPA; 1 DNS	SPA; 2; 11	MON; 1 Ret	BRN; 1 Ret	BRN; 2; 19	MAG; 1; 14	MAG; 2; 6	HUN; 1; 14	HUN; 2; 19	HOC; 1; 14	HOC; 2; 14	SIL; 1 Ret	SIL; 2; 16	CAT; 1	CAT; 2	23rd	5

Sporting positions
Preceded by Germán Sánchez; Spanish Formula Three	European F3 Open Championship; Champion; 2009	Succeeded by Marco Barba
