= Marco Barba =

Spanish racing driver

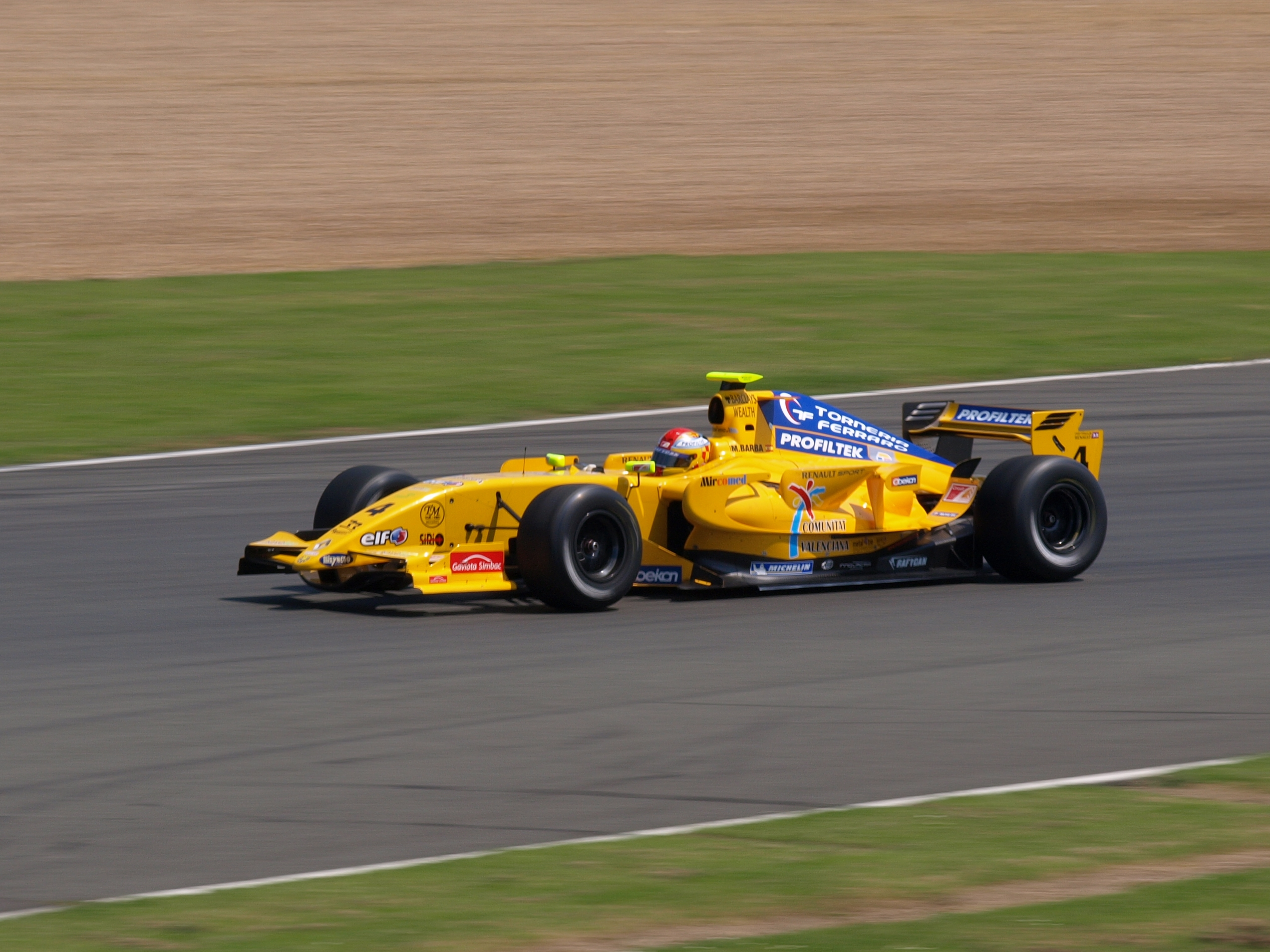
- Barba driving for Draco Racing at the Silverstone round of the 2008 Formula Renault 3.5 Series season
- Nationality: (Spain) Spanish
- Born: Marco Antonio Barba López; 10 November 1985 (age 40) Seville, Spain
- Relatives: Álvaro Barba (brother)

Auto GP career
- Debut season: 2011
- Current team: Campos Racing
- Car number: TBA

Previous series
- 2010 2006–09 2008 2005 2004–07 2003–04: European F3 Open Championship; Formula Renault 3.5 Series; International GT Open; Italian Formula Three; Spanish Formula Three; Spanish Formula Junior 1600

Championship titles
- 2010: European F3 Open

Marco Antonio Barba López (Note: In this Spanish name, the first or paternal surname is Barba and the second or maternal family name is López.) (born 10 November 1985 in Seville) is a Spanish former racing driver and brother to Álvaro Barba.

== Career ==
=== Formula Junior 1600 ===
Barba began his racing career in 2003 in the Spanish Formula Junior 1600 series, taking a single podium and two pole positions to finish the year in 12th place. He stayed in the championship the following year, taking eight podiums, including six race wins to finish runner–up behind current GP2 Series driver Michael Herck.

=== Formula Three ===
In 2004, Barba made his debut in the Spanish Formula Three Championship, racing in the rounds at Valencia and Barcelona. The following year, he stepped up to the championship full-time with Campos Racing, competing in the Copa de España class for older generation Dallara chassis. He took nine class podiums, including two class wins, to finish third in the standings, with teammate Arturo Llobell winning the title. In the overall championship standings he finished in 10th place. He also contested two races in the Italian Formula Three Championship for Team Ghinzani. Despite only taking part in two races, he scored enough points to be classified 10th in the final standings.

In 2006 and 2007, Barba raced in the main class of the series, firstly with Campos Racing before moving on to the TEC Auto team. During this period, he secured 14 podium places, including four race wins, and finished as runner–up to teammate Máximo Cortés in the 2007 season, losing out on the title by just four points.

For 2010, Barba rejoined the series, which is now known as the European F3 Open Championship. Driving for Cedars Motorsport, he won the title at the penultimate round of the season in Jerez.

=== Formula Renault 3.5 Series ===
In September 2006, Barba made his debut in the Formula Renault 3.5 Series at Donington Park, driving for Jenzer Motorsport alongside his older brother Álvaro. He contested the final six races of the season but failed to score a point.

Barba graduated to the Formula Renault 3.5 Series full-time in 2008, racing for the Italian Draco Racing squad alongside fellow team newcomer Bertrand Baguette. Although he failed to take a podium place, he finished in the points in nine races and was classified 14th in the championship standings.

Barba remained with the team for the 2009 season, and along with Baguette earned Draco the team championship, with Baguette also winning the driver's championship. Barba ended up ninth overall, recording a best result of two second places, with both coming at the Hungaroring.

=== International GT Open ===
In July 2008, Barba teamed up with his brother Álvaro to race a Mosler MT900R in the International GT Open event held at the newly constructed Valencia Street Circuit.

=== GP3 Series ===
In July 2010, Barba made his debut in the GP3 Series at the Hungaroring, replacing the injured Simon Trummer at Jenzer Motorsport. After retiring from the feature race, he recovered to finish 19th in the sprint event.

=== Auto GP ===
In March 2011, it was announced that Barba would join the Auto GP championship, racing for his former Formula Three team Campos Racing.

== Racing record ==
=== Career summary ===
Season	Series	Team	Races	Wins	Poles	F/Laps	Podiums	Points	Position
2003	Spanish Formula Junior 1600	Escuela Lois Circuit	?	0	2	?	1	?	12th
2004	Spanish Formula Junior 1600	Escuela Lois Circuit	12	6	6	?	8	117	**2nd**
2004	Spanish Formula 3 Championship	GTA Motor Competición	2	0	0	0	0	0	NC†
2004	Spanish Formula 3 Championship	Adrián Campos Motorsport	2	0	0	0	0	0	NC†
2005	Spanish Formula 3 Championship - Copa de España	Campos Racing	15	2	2	?	9	79	**3rd**
2005	Spanish Formula 3 Championship	Campos Racing	15	0	0	0	0	27	10th
2005	Italian Formula 3 Championship	Team Ghinzani	2	0	0	0	0	18	10th
2006	Spanish Formula 3 Championship	Campos Racing	15	1	0	0	5	67	7th
2006	Formula Renault 3.5 Series	Jenzer Motorsport	6	0	0	0	0	0	41st
2007	Spanish Formula 3 Championship	Escuderia TEC-Auto	16	3	0	0	9	113	**2nd**
2008	Formula Renault 3.5 Series	International DracoRacing	17	0	0	0	0	24	14th
2008	International GT Open - GTA	MC Competicion	2	0	0	0	0	0	NC
2009	Formula Renault 3.5 Series	International DracoRacing	17	0	2	0	2	50	9th
2010	European F3 Open Championship	Cedars Motorsport	15	6	3	8	11	154	**1st**
2010	GP3 Series	Jenzer Motorsport	2	0	0	0	0	0	35th
2011	Auto GP Series	Campos Racing	6	0	0	0	0	16	15th
2014	Formula Acceleration 1	Acceleration Team Spain	4	0	0	0	0	10	19th

† As he was a guest driver, Barba was ineligible to score points.

=== Complete Formula Renault 3.5 Series results ===
(key) (Races in bold indicate pole position) (Races in italics indicate fastest lap)

Year	Team	1	2	3	4	5	6	7	8	9	10	11	12	13	14	15	16	17	Pos	Points
2006	Jenzer Motorsport	ZOL; 1	ZOL; 2	MON; 1	IST; 1	IST; 2	MIS; 1	MIS; 2	SPA; 1	SPA; 2	NÜR; 1	NÜR; 2	DON; 1 Ret	DON; 2 Ret	LMS; 1; 22	LMS; 2; 18	CAT; 1; 18	CAT; 2; 17	41st	0
2008	International DracoRacing	MNZ; 1; 12	MNZ; 2; 8	SPA; 1 Ret	SPA; 2; 20	MON; 1; 24†	SIL; 1; 12	SIL; 2; 7	HUN; 1; 10	HUN; 2; 7	NÜR; 1 Ret	NÜR; 2; 10	BUG; 1; 10	BUG; 2; 8	EST; 1; 6	EST; 2; 10	CAT; 1; 16†	CAT; 2 Ret	14th	24
2009	International DracoRacing	CAT; 1 Ret	CAT; 2 Ret	**SPA**; **1**; 7	SPA; 2; 12	MON; 1; 16	HUN; 1; 2	HUN; 2; 2	SIL; 1; 10	SIL; 2; 10	**BUG**; **1**; 5	BUG; 2; 7	ALG; 1; 16	ALG; 2; 11	NÜR; 1; 8	NÜR; 2; 7	ALC; 1; 14	ALC; 2; 6	9th	50

^{†} Driver did not finish the race, but was classified as he completed more than 90% of the race distance.

== Notes ==
Sporting positions
Preceded by Bruno Méndez	European F3 Open Championship; Champion; 2010	Succeeded by Alex Fontana
