= 2011 Auto GP Series =

Seasons
- ← 2010 2012 →

The 2011 Auto GP Series was the second year of the Auto GP, and the thirteenth season of the former Euroseries 3000. The championship began on 14 May at Monza and finished on 4 September at the Circuit Ricardo Tormo in Valencia, after seven double-header rounds.

The series became part of the World Touring Car Championship meetings and received Eurosport coverage. The series also adopted the Formula One points system for the first race of the weekend, with a consequent change in the lower points-awarding second race. The season champion and the top driver under 21 years of age Kevin Ceccon received a GP2 Series test.

Ombra Racing driver Kevin Ceccon claimed the championship title, taking just one victory on Hungaroring with four other podium placings. Luca Filippi who missed Oshersleben's round due to GP2 Series commitments finished season as runner-up with one win at Brno. Sergey Afanasyev missed Donington Park round because of problems with British visa scored three wins at Budapest, Oshersleben and Valencia, more than any other driver in this season. He finished season on the third position in the standings.

== Teams and drivers ==
| Team | No. | Driver | Rounds |
|---|---|---|---|
| (France) DAMS | 1 | (Russia) Sergey Afanasyev | 1–3, 5–7 |
| (France) DAMS | 2 | (Indonesia) Rio Haryanto | 1–4, 6–7 |
| (France) DAMS | 2 | (Estonia) Kevin Korjus | 5 |
| (France) DAMS | 3 | (France) Adrien Tambay | 1–3 |
| (Italy) TP Formula | 4 | (Italy) Samuele Buttarelli | All |
| (Italy) TP Formula | 17 | (Italy) Pasquale Di Sabatino | 2–7 |
| (Italy) Ombra Racing | 5 | (Italy) Kevin Ceccon | All |
| (Italy) Ombra Racing | 6 | (Italy) Francesco Dracone | 4–7 |
| (Italy) Ombra Racing | 11 | (Italy) Pasquale Di Sabatino | 1 |
| (Italy) Ombra Racing | 11 | (Italy) Stefano Bizzarri | 2 |
| (Italy) Ombra Racing | 71 | (Italy) Michele la Rosa | 7 |
| (Italy) Emmebi Motorsport | 6 | (Italy) Francesco Dracone | 1–3 |
| (Italy) Griffitz Durango | 7 | (Italy) Giovanni Venturini | All |
| (Italy) Griffitz Durango | 8 | (Italy) Giuseppe Cipriani | All |
| (United Kingdom) Super Nova Racing | 9 | (South Africa) Adrian Zaugg | 1 |
| (United Kingdom) Super Nova Racing | 9 | (United Kingdom) Jon Lancaster | 3–4 |
| (United Kingdom) Super Nova Racing | 9 | (Italy) Luca Filippi | 7 |
| (United Kingdom) Super Nova Racing | 10 | (Italy) Luca Filippi | 1–4, 6 |
| (Italy) Lazarus | 15 | (Italy) Fabrizio Crestani | All |
| (Italy) Lazarus | 16 | (Italy) Fabio Onidi | All |
| (Spain) Campos Racing | 22 | (Spain) Bruno Méndez | 1–5 |
| (Spain) Campos Racing | 22 | (United Kingdom) Adam Carroll | 6–7 |
| (Spain) Campos Racing | 23 | (Spain) Adrian Campos, Jr. | 1, 4–6 |
| (Spain) Campos Racing | 23 | (Venezuela) Rodolfo González | 2 |
| (Spain) Campos Racing | 33 | (Spain) Marco Barba | 1–3 |
| (Spain) Campos Racing | 33 | (United Kingdom) Adam Carroll | 4 |
| (Spain) Campos Racing | 33 | (France) Adrien Tambay | 5–7 |
| (Netherlands) MP Motorsport | 27 | (Netherlands) Daniël de Jong | 4–6 |

== Calendar ==
A seven-round calendar was published on 22 November 2010. Six of the seven rounds will support World Touring Car Championship events, with the other event being held as a stand-alone event, with other series in support. On 8 March 2011, the round due to be held in Marrakech was dropped from the calendar, and will be replaced by the Hungaroring. On 23 June 2011, the round scheduled to be held in Bucharest was dropped from the calendar due to financial and track difficulties. It will be replaced by a headline event, with the Italian Formula Three Championship in support, held at Mugello.

| Round | | Circuit/Location | Date | Pole position | Fastest lap | Winning driver | Winning team | Supporting |
|---|---|---|---|---|---|---|---|---|
| 1 | R1 | (Italy) Monza Circuit | 14 May | (Italy) Giovanni Venturini | (Italy) Luca Filippi | (Italy) Giovanni Venturini | (Italy) Griffitz Durango | FIA WTCC Race of Italy |
| 1 | R2 | (Italy) Monza Circuit | 15 May | | (South Africa) Adrian Zaugg | (Italy) Fabio Onidi | (Italy) Lazarus | FIA WTCC Race of Italy |
| 2 | R1 | (Hungary) Hungaroring, Mogyoród | 4 June | (Italy) Luca Filippi | (Italy) Luca Filippi | (Italy) Kevin Ceccon | (Italy) Ombra Racing | FIA WTCC Race of Hungary |
| 2 | R2 | (Hungary) Hungaroring, Mogyoród | 5 June | | (Italy) Luca Filippi | (Russia) Sergey Afanasyev | (France) DAMS | FIA WTCC Race of Hungary |
| 3 | R1 | (Czech Republic) Masaryk Circuit, Brno | 19 June | (Indonesia) Rio Haryanto | (United Kingdom) Jon Lancaster | (Italy) Luca Filippi | (United Kingdom) Super Nova Racing | FIA WTCC Race of Czech Rep. |
| 3 | R2 | (Czech Republic) Masaryk Circuit, Brno | 19 June | | (Italy) Kevin Ceccon | (Italy) Samuele Buttarelli | (Italy) TP Formula | FIA WTCC Race of Czech Rep. |
| 4 | R1 | (United Kingdom) Donington Park | 16 July | (United Kingdom) Adam Carroll | (United Kingdom) Jon Lancaster | (United Kingdom) Jon Lancaster | (United Kingdom) Super Nova Racing | FIA WTCC Race of UK |
| 4 | R2 | (United Kingdom) Donington Park | 17 July | | (Italy) Kevin Ceccon | (Italy) Samuele Buttarelli | (Italy) TP Formula | FIA WTCC Race of UK |
| 5 | R1 | (Germany) Motorsport Arena Oschersleben | 30 July | (Italy) Fabrizio Crestani | (Russia) Sergey Afanasyev | (Russia) Sergey Afanasyev | (France) DAMS | FIA WTCC Race of Germany |
| 5 | R2 | (Germany) Motorsport Arena Oschersleben | 31 July | | (Italy) Kevin Ceccon | (Italy) Giovanni Venturini | (Italy) Griffitz Durango | FIA WTCC Race of Germany |
| 6 | R1 | (Spain) Circuit Ricardo Tormo, Cheste | 3 September | (Russia) Sergey Afanasyev | (Italy) Luca Filippi | (Russia) Sergey Afanasyev | (France) DAMS | FIA WTCC Race of Spain |
| 6 | R2 | (Spain) Circuit Ricardo Tormo, Cheste | 4 September | | (Indonesia) Rio Haryanto | (Indonesia) Rio Haryanto | (France) DAMS | FIA WTCC Race of Spain |
| 7 | R1 | (Italy) Mugello Circuit | 1 October | (France) Adrien Tambay | (United Kingdom) Adam Carroll | (France) Adrien Tambay | (Spain) Campos Racing | Stand-alone event |
| 7 | R2 | (Italy) Mugello Circuit | 2 October | | (Indonesia) Rio Haryanto | (United Kingdom) Adam Carroll | (Spain) Campos Racing | Stand-alone event |

== Championship standings ==
- Points for both championships were awarded as follows:

Race
| Position | 1st | 2nd | 3rd | 4th | 5th | 6th | 7th | 8th | 9th | 10th |
|---|---|---|---|---|---|---|---|---|---|---|
| **Race One** | 25 | 18 | 15 | 12 | 10 | 8 | 6 | 4 | 2 | 1 |
| **Race Two** | 18 | 13 | 10 | 8 | 6 | 4 | 2 | 1 | | |

In addition:

- One point will be awarded for Pole position for Race One
- One point will be awarded for fastest lap in each race

=== Drivers' Championship ===
| Pos | Driver | MNZ (Italy) | | HUN (Hungary) | | BRN (Czech Republic) | | DON (United Kingdom) | | OSC (Germany) | | VAL (Spain) | | MUG (Italy) | | Points |
|---|---|---|---|---|---|---|---|---|---|---|---|---|---|---|---|---|
| 1 | (Italy) Kevin Ceccon | 5 | 3 | 1 | 10 | 3 | 7 | 4 | 6 | 3 | 6 | 3 | 8 | 4 | 7 | 130 |
| 2 | (Italy) Luca Filippi | 2 | 6 | **11** | 2 | 1 | 3 | 2 | 5 | | | 12 | 7 | 2 | 4 | 127 |
| 3 | (Russia) Sergey Afanasyev | 4 | 10 | 5 | 1 | 8 | 9 | | | 1 | 2 | **1** | 14 | 6 | 13 | 117 |
| 4 | (France) Adrien Tambay | Ret | 2 | 2 | 4 | Ret | 8 | | | 2 | 3 | 6 | 4 | **1** | 6 | 114 |
| 5 | (Italy) Fabio Onidi | 8 | 1 | 4 | 6 | Ret | 5 | 13† | DNS | 4 | 10 | 2 | 6 | 3 | 5 | 99 |
| 6 | (Italy) Fabrizio Crestani | Ret | 9 | 7 | 14 | 2 | 4 | 3 | 3 | **Ret** | 9 | 4 | 5 | 7 | 3 | 92 |
| 7 | (Indonesia) Rio Haryanto | Ret | 11 | 10 | 5 | **6** | 2 | 11 | 11 | | | 5 | 1 | 5 | 2 | 82 |
| 8 | (Italy) Samuele Buttarelli | 3 | 8 | 13 | 16† | 7 | 1 | 8 | 1 | Ret | 8 | 7 | 3 | 10 | 8 | 81 |
| 9 | (Italy) Giovanni Venturini | **1** | 5 | 3 | 7 | Ret | 11 | 9 | 7 | 8 | 1 | 10 | 9 | 11 | 9 | 76 |
| 10 | (United Kingdom) Adam Carroll | | | | | | | **5** | 2 | | | 8 | 2 | 8 | 1 | 64 |
| 11 | (United Kingdom) Jon Lancaster | | | | | 4 | 6 | 1 | 4 | | | | | | | 51 |
| 12 | (Italy) Pasquale Di Sabatino | 7 | 12 | 8 | 8 | 5 | 13† | 10 | Ret | 7 | 4 | 11 | 10 | 9 | 10 | 38 |
| 13 | (Spain) Bruno Méndez | 9 | 15 | 9 | 3 | Ret | DNS | 7 | Ret | 9 | DSQ | | | | | 22 |
| 14 | (Netherlands) Daniël de Jong | | | | | | | 6 | 8 | 6 | 7 | 13 | 11 | | | 19 |
| 15 | (Spain) Marco Barba | 6 | 4 | Ret | 9 | Ret | 10 | | | | | | | | | 16 |
| 16 | (Spain) Adrián Campos Jr. | DNS | DNS | | | | | DNS | 9 | 5 | 11 | 9 | 15† | | | 12 |
| 17 | (Venezuela) Rodolfo González | | | 6 | 15 | | | | | | | | | | | 8 |
| 18 | (Estonia) Kevin Korjus | | | | | | | | | 10† | 5 | | | | | 7 |
| 19 | (South Africa) Adrian Zaugg | 11 | 7 | | | | | | | | | | | | | 3 |
| 20 | (Italy) Giuseppe Cipriani | Ret | 14 | 15 | 13 | 9 | 12 | 12 | Ret | Ret | 13† | 15 | 12 | 13† | Ret | 2 |
| 21 | (Italy) Francesco Dracone | 10 | 13 | 12 | 12 | Ret | 14† | Ret | 10 | Ret | 12† | 14 | 13 | 14† | 11 | 1 |
| 22 | (Italy) Stefano Bizzarri | | | 14 | 11 | | | | | | | | | | | 0 |
| 23 | (Italy) Michele la Rosa | | | | | | | | | | | | | 12 | 12 | 0 |
| Pos | Driver | MNZ (Italy) | | HUN (Hungary) | | BRN (Czech Republic) | | DON (United Kingdom) | | OSC (Germany) | | VAL (Spain) | | MUG (Italy) | | Points |

| Colour | Result |
|---|---|
| Gold | Winner |
| Silver | Second place |
| Bronze | Third place |
| Green | Points classification |
| Blue | Non-points classification |
| Blue | Non-classified finish (NC) |
| Purple | Retired, not classified (Ret) |
| Red | Did not qualify (DNQ) |
| Red | Did not pre-qualify (DNPQ) |
| Black | Disqualified (DSQ) |
| White | Did not start (DNS) |
| White | Withdrew (WD) |
| White | Race cancelled (C) |
| Blank | Did not practice (DNP) |
| Blank | Did not arrive (DNA) |
| Blank | Excluded (EX) |

**Bold** – Pole for Race One
Italics – Fastest Lap

=== Teams' Championship ===
| Pos | Team | MON (Italy) | | HUN (Hungary) | | BRN (Czech Republic) | | DON (United Kingdom) | | OSC (Germany) | | VAL (Spain) | | MUG (Italy) | | Points |
|---|---|---|---|---|---|---|---|---|---|---|---|---|---|---|---|---|
| 1 | (France) DAMS | 4 | 2 | 2 | 1 | **6** | 2 | 11 | 11 | 1 | 2 | **1** | 1 | 5 | 2 | 238 |
| 1 | (France) DAMS | Ret | 10 | 5 | 4 | 8 | 8 | | | 10† | 5 | 5 | 14 | 6 | 13 | 238 |
| 2 | (Spain) Campos Racing | 6 | 4 | 6 | 3 | Ret | 10 | **5** | 2 | 2 | 3 | 6 | 2 | **1** | 1 | 190 |
| 2 | (Spain) Campos Racing | 9 | 15 | 9 | 9 | Ret | DNS | 7 | 9 | 5 | 11 | 8 | 4 | 8 | 6 | 190 |
| 3 | (Italy) Lazarus | 8 | 1 | 4 | 6 | 2 | 4 | 3 | 3 | 4 | 9 | 2 | 5 | 3 | 3 | 190 |
| 3 | (Italy) Lazarus | Ret | 9 | 7 | 14 | Ret | 5 | 13† | DNS | **Ret** | 10 | 4 | 6 | 7 | 5 | 190 |
| 4 | (United Kingdom) Super Nova Racing | 2 | 6 | **11** | 2 | 1 | 3 | 1 | 4 | | | 12 | 7 | 2 | 4 | 181 |
| 4 | (United Kingdom) Super Nova Racing | 11 | 7 | | | 4 | 6 | 2 | 5 | | | | | | | 181 |
| 5 | (Italy) Ombra Racing | 5 | 3 | 1 | 10 | 3 | 7 | 4 | 6 | 3 | 6 | 3 | 8 | 4 | 7 | 136 |
| 5 | (Italy) Ombra Racing | 7 | 12 | 14 | 11 | | | Ret | 10 | Ret | 12† | 14 | 13 | 12 | 11 | 136 |
| 6 | (Italy) TP Formula | 3 | 8 | 8 | 8 | 5 | 1 | 8 | 1 | 7 | 4 | 7 | 3 | 9 | 8 | 113 |
| 6 | (Italy) TP Formula | | | 13 | 16 | 7 | 13† | 10 | Ret | Ret | 8 | 11 | 10 | 10 | 10 | 113 |
| 7 | (Italy) Griffitz Durango | **1** | 5 | 3 | 7 | 9 | 11 | 9 | 7 | 8 | 1 | 10 | 9 | 11 | 9 | 78 |
| 7 | (Italy) Griffitz Durango | Ret | 14 | 15 | 13 | Ret | 12 | 12 | Ret | Ret | 13† | 15 | 12 | 13† | Ret | 78 |
| 8 | (Netherlands) MP Motorsport | | | | | | | 6 | 8 | 6 | 7 | 13 | 11 | | | 19 |
| 9 | (Italy) Emmebi Motorsport | 10 | 13 | 12 | 12 | Ret | 14† | | | | | | | | | 1 |
| Pos | Team | MON (Italy) | | HUN (Hungary) | | BRN (Czech Republic) | | DON (United Kingdom) | | OSC (Germany) | | VAL (Spain) | | MUG (Italy) | | Points |

| Colour | Result |
|---|---|
| Gold | Winner |
| Silver | Second place |
| Bronze | Third place |
| Green | Points classification |
| Blue | Non-points classification |
| Blue | Non-classified finish (NC) |
| Purple | Retired, not classified (Ret) |
| Red | Did not qualify (DNQ) |
| Red | Did not pre-qualify (DNPQ) |
| Black | Disqualified (DSQ) |
| White | Did not start (DNS) |
| White | Withdrew (WD) |
| White | Race cancelled (C) |
| Blank | Did not practice (DNP) |
| Blank | Did not arrive (DNA) |
| Blank | Excluded (EX) |

**Bold** – Pole for Race One
Italics – Fastest Lap

=== Under 21 Trophy ===
| Pos | Pilot | Points |
|---|---|---|
| 1 | (Italy) Kevin Ceccon | 222 |
| 2 | (France) Adrien Tambay | 159 |
| 3 | (Italy) Samuele Buttarelli | 148 |
| 4 | (Italy) Giovanni Venturini | 147 |
| 5 | (Indonesia) Rio Haryanto | 143 |
| 6 | (Spain) Bruno Méndez | 71 |
| 7 | (Netherlands) Daniël de Jong | 59 |
| 8 | (Estonia) Kevin Korjus | 18 |
| 9 | (Italy) Stefano Bizzarri | 10 |
