= Thor-Christian Ebbesvik =

Norwegian racing driver (born 1983)

Thor–Christian Ebbesvik
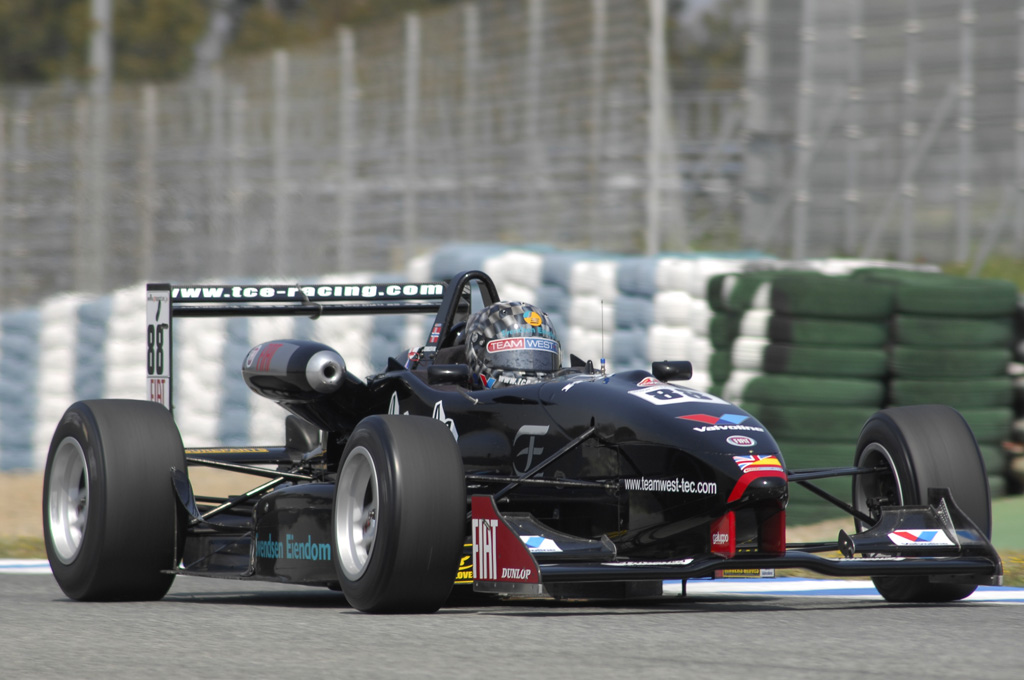
- Christian Ebbesvik in Jerez, Spain in 2007
- Nationality: (Norway) Norwegian
- Born: 17 December 1983 (age 42) Bergen (Norway)

Le Mans Series – LMP2 career
- Debut season: 2010
- Current team: Race Performance
- Car number: TBA
- Former teams: Team Bruichladdich
- Starts: 5
- Wins: 0
- Poles: 0
- Fastest laps: 0
- Best finish: 5th in 2010

Previous series
- 2009 2009 2007–08 2005–06: European F3 Open; Formula Le Mans Cup; Spanish Formula Three; British Formula Ford

Championship titles
- 2007: Spanish F3 Copa de España

Thor–Christian Ebbesvik (born 17 December 1983 in Bergen) is a professional racing driver from Norway.

== Career ==
=== Formula Ford ===
Ebbesvik began his racing career in 2005, driving for Team JLR in the British Formula Ford Championship. He finished the year in sixth place and also took part in the end–of–season Formula Ford Festival at Brands Hatch, where he failed to finish. He continued in the series in 2006, improving to fourth place in the championship. He took four podium finishes during the season, including a win at Thruxton. He again took part in the Formula Ford Festival, this time competing in the Duratec class, but once again retired from the race.

=== Formula Three ===
In 2007, Ebbesvik moved up to Formula Three, competing in the Spanish championship for the British outfit Team West–Tec. He was entered into the secondary Copa de España class, which featured older–generation Dallara chassis. At the end of the season, he finished tied on points with Peruvian driver Juan Manuel Polar, but took the title by virtue of taking more second places than Polar after they scored seven class wins each.

For 2008, Ebbesvik remained with Team West–Tec in Spanish Formula Three, beginning the year with a Dallara F306 chassis before switching to a newer F308 model after the first two rounds of the season. In August of that year, Ebbesvik dominated the most prestigious race of the season to win on the Valencia Street Circuit, with the race acting as a support event for the Formula One European Grand Prix. He took a further race win at Jerez in October to finish the championship in tenth place, one position ahead of team–mate Jonathan Legris.

Ebbesvik continued in the championship for a third year in 2009, when the series was renamed as the European F3 Open Championship. He finished the season in fifth place, taking a single victory at Donington Park with further podium places at Magny–Cours and Monza.

=== Formula Le Mans Cup ===
In May 2009, Ebbesvik contested the opening two races of the new Formula Le Mans Cup at Spa–Francorchamps. Sharing an Oreca FLM09 with Swiss driver Christophe Pillon, he finished both races in fifth position.

=== Le Mans Series ===
Ebbesvik made a full-time switch from single–seaters to sportscar racing in 2010, racing for Team Bruichladdich in the LMP2 class of the Le Mans Series and Le Mans 24 Hours, sharing a Ginetta–Zytek GZ09SB/2 with Tim Greaves and Karim Ojjeh. In the second event of the season, the Spa 1000 km, Ebbesvik was injured after an accident involving a slower GT car, sustaining a fractured vertebra which subsequently ruled him out of the following month's Le Mans 24 Hours. Two overall fifth–place finishes, including anchoring the team to its best ever podium position in LMP2, at the following two rounds in Portimão and Hungaroring ensured that he finished the year in fifth position in the LMP2 standings. Indeed, at the season finale at Silverstone, Ebbesvik managed to take the Zytek into the LMP2 lead for the first time ever, although the car was subsequently crashed by Ojjeh.

Ebbesvik was due to continue with the team in 2011, competing alongside Ojjeh and team newcomer Gary Chalandon, but was surprisingly and unexpectedly replaced by Tom Kimber–Smith a few weeks before the start of the season. He did, however, sign a last–minute deal to race in the season–opening event at Paul Ricard, where he finished 10th overall in an LMP2 class Oreca 03–Judd entered by Race Performance.

For the second round of the season, the Spa 1000 km, Ebbesvik was set to graduate to the premier LMP1 class, racing a Lola–Judd for the Guess Racing Europ team, but the entry was withdrawn as the car would not be ready in time for the event.

For the final two rounds of the 2011 Le Mans Series, Ebbesvik signed to Boutsen Energy to lead their LMP2 campaign, replacing their previous pro driver, Nicolas de Crem, in the team's Oreca 03-Nissan.

=== Other series ===
In September 2007, Ebbesvik became the first ever Norwegian to drive a GP2 car when he tested for Racing Engineering at the Jerez circuit. The following year, he once again took part in GP2 series testing, driving for Racing Engineering, Arden International, DAMS and Fisichella Motor Sport at both Paul Ricard and Jerez. He had intended to race in GP2 in 2009, but could not find the required budget to compete. In November 2008, Ebbesvik also took part in Formula Renault 3.5 Series testing, driving for both Comtec Racing and Fortec Motorsport in Valencia.

== Racing record ==
=== Career summary ===
Season	Series	Team	Races	Wins	Poles	F/Laps	Podiums	Points	Position
2005	British Formula Ford Championship	Team JLR	20	0	0	0	0	321	6th
2005	Formula Ford Festival	Team JLR	1	0	0	0	0	N/A	NC
2006	British Formula Ford Championship	Team JLR	20	1	0	2	4	357	4th
2006	Formula Ford Festival – Duratec Class	Team JLR	1	0	0	0	0	N/A	NC
2007	Spanish Formula Three Championship – Copa de España	Team West–Tec	14	7	3	?	12	118	1st
2007	Spanish Formula Three Championship	Team West–Tec	14	0	0	0	0	7	16th
2008	Spanish Formula Three Championship – Copa de España	Team West–Tec	4	0	0	0	0	10	12th
2008	Spanish Formula Three Championship	Team West–Tec	17	2	1	0	2	49	10th
2009	European F3 Open Championship	Team West–Tec	16	1	1	1	3	64	5th
2009	Formula Le Mans Cup	Hope Polevision Racing	2	0	0	0	0	16	20th
2010	Le Mans Series – LMP2	Team Bruichladdich	5	0	0	0	1	46	5th
2011	Le Mans Series – LMP2	Race Performance; Boutsen Energy Racing	3	0	0	0	0	18	13th

Sporting positions
Preceded by Germán Sánchez	Spanish Formula Three; Copa de España; Champion; 2007	Succeeded by Natacha Gachnang
