= Ricardo Risatti =

Argentine racing driver

Ricardo Risatti III
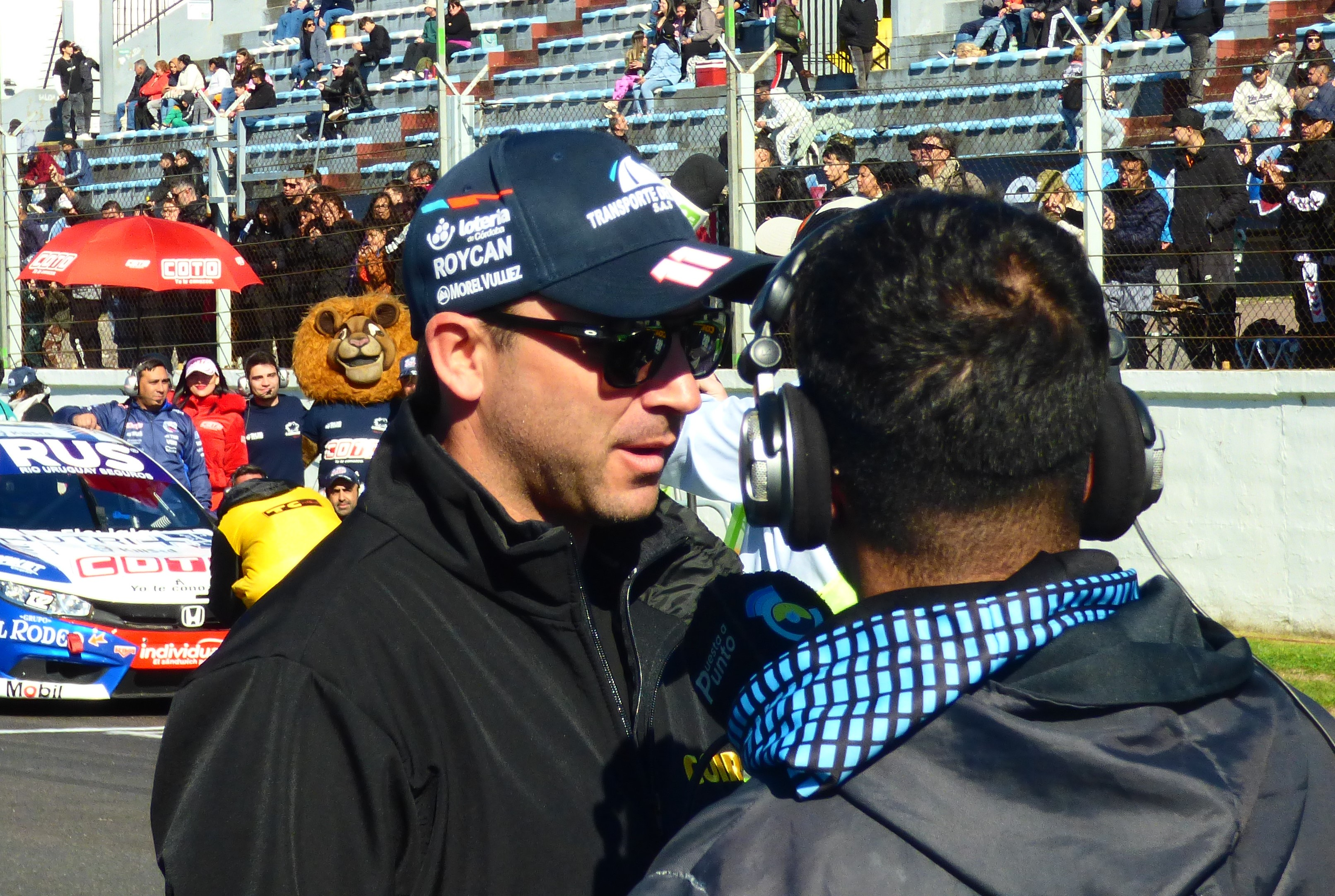
- Ricardo Risatti
- Nationality: Argentine
- Born: Ricardo Risatti III; September 27, 1986 (age 40) Buenos Aires, Argentina

Previous series
- 2008 2008 2007 2007 2003-2006 2001-2002: FIA GT; TC2000; GP2 Series; World Series by Renault; Spanish F3 Championship; Formula Three Sudamericana

Championship titles
- 2006: Spanish F3 Championship

Ricardo "Caíto" Risatti III (born September 27, 1986, in Buenos Aires) is an Argentine racing driver. He was the 2006 Spanish Formula Three champion and now competes in the Argentine touring car series, TC 2000.

Risatti is a fourth-generation racer. His great-grandfather, Ricardo Leopoldo Risatti, won the Campeonato Argentino de Velocidad (predecessor to Turismo Carretera) in 1938, and his grandfather Jesús Ricardo Risatti along with father Ricardo Risatti, Jr. and uncle Gerardo Risatti have competed domestically.

== Career history ==
Risatti began his junior racing career in karting in 1998. After a relatively short period of three seasons, he progressed into formula racing in the B-class of Formula Three Sudamericana, which is based in Brazil. He entered only three races in 2001, but was one of twelve Argentinians who competed at some point in that year's championship. This was an unusually high number; the 2002 season featured only two Argentine drivers, including Risatti himself. In his first full season, Risatti was placed fourth in the B-class standings.

Risatti moved to Europe to compete in the Spanish Formula Three Championship in 2003, driving at various times for E.V. Racing and Elide Racing in ten of the thirteen races. After making annual progress with eleventh, fifth and third places in the championship, Risatti secured the 2006 title with TEC Auto.

In February 2007, Risatti was announced as a GP2 Series driver with BCN Competicion, but this position was later taken by Ho-Pin Tung. He instead competed in the World Series by Renault with GD (Great Dane) Racing. Risatti had a second chance to make his GP2 series debut when Pastor Maldonado broke his collarbone during training. Risatti competed with Trident Racing at Istanbul Park in Turkey and Monza in Italy. During this time, Luiz Razia substituted for Risatti in the Fórmula Renault 3.5 Series.

Since 2008, Risatti has exclusively pursued his career in Argentina. In TC2000, he served as a factory driver for Chevrolet and Honda, achieving a victory in 2012. He competed in Turismo Carretera between 2009 and 2014 and again in 2023. His best results came in Top Race V6, where he finished third in 2015.

== Racing record ==
=== Complete Formula Three Sudamericana results ===
(key) (Races in bold indicate pole position; races in italics indicate fastest lap)

Year	Entrant	Chassis	Engine	1	2	3	4	5	6	7	8	9	10	11	12	13	14	15	16	17	18	DC	Points
2001	Sur Racing	Dallara F394	Mugen-Honda	PAR	LON	BUE	MDA	BRA1	FOR	CAM	PIR; Ret	RCU; 8	CAS; 9	BRA2								NC	0
2002	Sur Racing	Dallara F394	Mugen-Honda	LON; 1	LON; 2	PAR; 1; 11	PAR; 2 Ret	CUR; 1; 13	CUR; 2; 10	CAM; 1; 11	CAM; 2; 11	FOR; 1	FOR; 2	OBE; 1; 11	OBE; 2; 8	RDJ; 1	RDJ; 2	CAS; 1	CAS; 2	BRA; 1	BRA; 2	19th	4

=== Complete Spanish Formula Three Championship results ===
(key) (Races in bold indicate pole position) (Races in italics indicate fastest lap)

Year	Team	1	2	3	4	5	6	7	8	9	10	11	12	13	14	15	16	Pos	Points
2003	EV Racing	ALB; 1; 5	ALB; 2; 3	JAR; 1; 7	JAR; 2; 11	JER; 1; 18	JER; 2 DNS	EST; 1; 8	EST; 2; 8	VAL; 1 Ret	VAL; 2 Ret							11th	70
2003	Elide Racing											JER; Ret	CAT; 1; 16†	CAT; 2; 7				11th	70
2004	IGI Tec-Auto	ALB; 1; 4	ALB; 2; 3	JAR; 1; 12	JAR; 2; 4	JER; 1; 4	JER; 2; 4	EST; 1; 8	EST; 2; 12	VAL; 1; 4	VAL; 2; 10†	JER; 1; 10	JER; 2 Ret	CAT; 1; 7	CAT; 2; 7			5th	50
2005	Racing Engineering	JAR; 1; 6	JAR; 2; 4	VAL; 1; 7	VAL; 2; 4	ALB; 6	EST; 1; 10	**EST**; **2**; 1	ALB; 1; 1	ALB; 2; 1	VAL; 1; 16†	VAL; 2; 3	**JER**; **1**; 3	**JER**; **2**; 1	**CAT**; **1**; 5	**CAT**; **2** NC		3rd	96
2006	Tec-Auto	**VAL**; **1** Ret	VAL; 2; 6	**MAG**; **1**; 1	MAG; 2; 3	JAR; 1; 2	JAR; 2; 1	EST; 1; 18	EST; 2; 5	ALB; 1; 5	ALB; 2; 1	**VAL**; **1**; 1	VAL; 2; 9	JER; 1; 5	JER; 2; 1	CAT; 1; 7	CAT; 2; 4	1st	118

=== Complete Formula Renault 3.5 Series results ===
(key) (Races in bold indicate pole position) (Races in italics indicate fastest lap)

Year	Team	1	2	3	4	5	6	7	8	9	10	11	12	13	14	15	16	17	Pos	Points
2007	GR Racing	MNZ; 1 Ret	MNZ; 2; 20	NÜR; 1; 18	NÜR; 2; 16	MON; 1 Ret	HUN; 1; 19	HUN; 2; 16	SPA; 1; 18	SPA; 2 Ret	DON; 1	DON; 2	MAG; 1	MAG; 2	EST; 1	EST; 2	CAT; 1	CAT; 2	35th	0

=== Complete GP2 Series results ===
(key) (Races in bold indicate pole position) (Races in italics indicate fastest lap)

Year	Entrant	1	2	3	4	5	6	7	8	9	10	11	12	13	14	15	16	17	18	19	20	21	DC	Points
2007	Trident Racing	BHR; FEA	BHR; SPR	CAT; FEA	CAT; SPR	MON; FEA	MAG; FEA	MAG; SPR	SIL; FEA	SIL; SPR	NÜR; FEA	NÜR; SPR	HUN; FEA	HUN; SPR	IST; FEA; 16	IST; SPR; 10	MNZ; FEA; 8	MNZ; SPR; Ret	SPA; FEA; 20	SPA; SPR; 18	VAL; FEA	VAL; SPR	28th	1

=== Complete GT1 World Championship results ===
Year	Team	Car	1	2	3	4	5	6	7	8	9	10	11	12	13	14	15	16	17	18	19	20	Pos	Points
2010	All-Inkl.com Münnich Motorsport	Lamborghini Murciélago LP670 R-SV	ABU; QR	ABU; CR	SIL; QR	SIL; CR	BRN; QR	BRN; CR	PRI; QR	PRI; CR	SPA; QR	SPA; CR	NÜR; QR	NÜR; CR	ALG; QR	ALG; CR	NAV; QR	NAV; CR	INT; QR	INT; CR	SAN; QR; 14	SAN; CR; 6	39th	8
2011	Marc VDS Racing Team	Ford GT1	ABU; QR	ABU; CR	ZOL; QR	ZOL; CR	ALG; QR	ALG; QR	SAC; QR	SAC; CR	SIL; QR	SIL; CR	NAV; QR	NAV; CR	PRI; QR	PRI; CR	ORD; QR	ORD; CR	BEI; QR	BEI; CR	SAN; QR; Ret	SAN; CR; 9	35th	2

== Footnotes ==
Sporting positions
Preceded by Andy Soucek	Spanish Formula Three Champion; 2006	Succeeded by Máximo Cortés
