= A Roda (Tapia de Casariego) =

Coordinates: 43.533333°N 6.883333°W

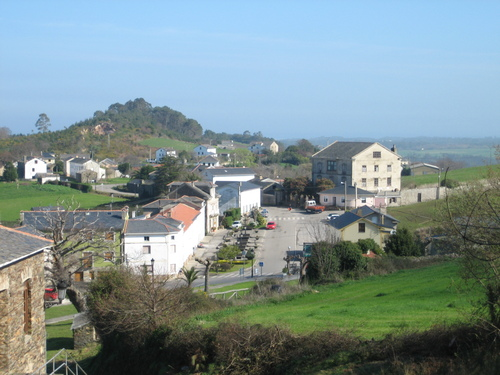

A Roda is one of four parishes (administrative divisions) in Tapia de Casariego, a municipality within the province and autonomous community of Asturias, in northern Spain. As of 2018, the population was 187, with 90 males & 97 females living in the parish.

== Towns ==
- A Barrosa
- Acebedo
- As Fonsarias
- Bustello
- Llantrapiñán
- Matafoyada
- El Monte
- Mumián
- Orxales
- Reiriz
- Riocabo
- A Roda
- San Xuyán
- El Valle de San Agustín
- A Veguía
- Villarín
- Xarias
