= Gustavo Yacamán =

Colombian racing driver (born 1991)

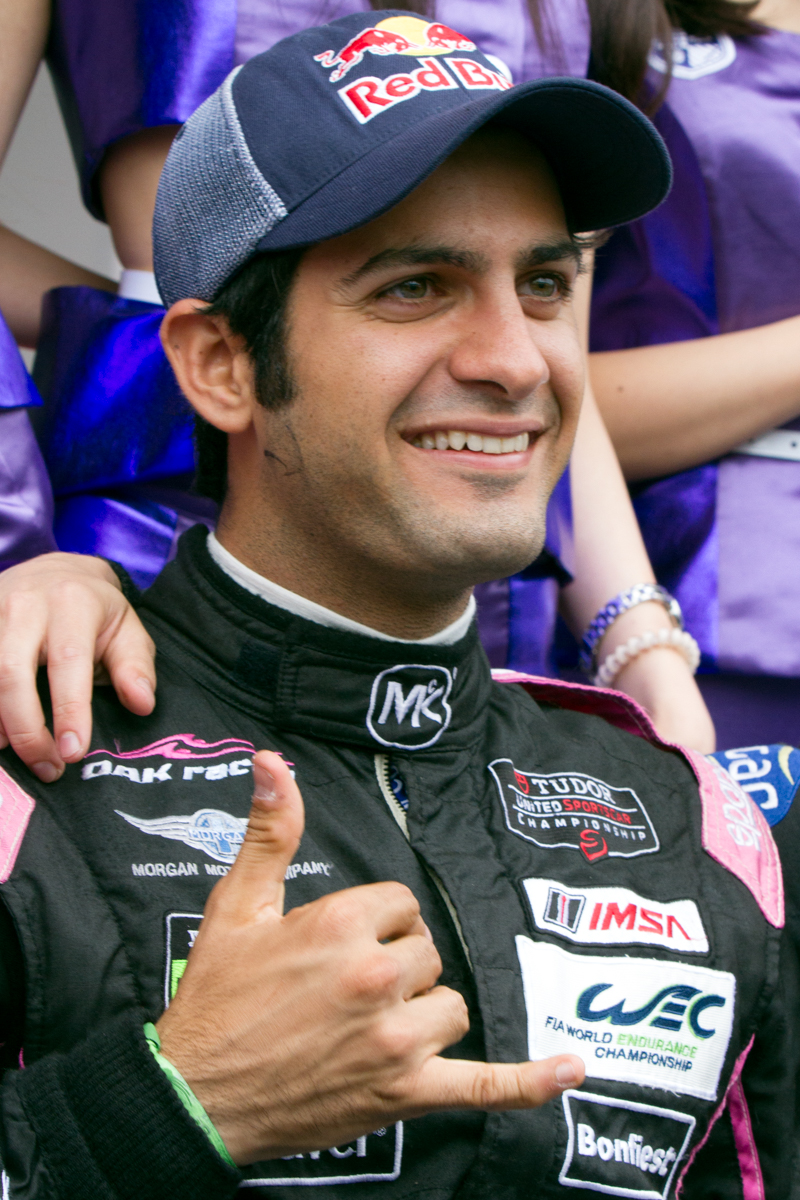
- Yacamán in 2014.
- Nationality: (Colombia) Colombian
- Born: February 25, 1991 (age 35) Santiago de Cali, Colombia

International GT Open career
- Debut season: 2016
- Current team: BMW Team Teo Martín
- Categorisation: FIA Gold
- Car number: 2
- Starts: 14
- Wins: 1
- Poles: 2
- Fastest laps: 0
- Best finish: 2nd in 2016

Previous series
- 2015 2013-2014 2012 2009-2012 2006–08 2006: FIA World Endurance; WeatherTech Sportscar; Rolex Sports Car Series; Firestone Indy Lights; Spanish Formula 3 Spanish Formula BMW

Gustavo "El Tigrillo" (English: The Ocelot) Yacamán Aristizabal (born February 25, 1991) is a Colombian racing driver from Santiago de Cali who currently manages the USF Juniors series. Yacamán began his career in open-wheel racing, but switched to sports car endurance racing in 2012. He raced in the US until he joined G-Drive Racing in 2015, where he drove a Ligier in the WEC Championship and finished that season third in the LMP2 class. In 2016 Yacamán switched to a sprint format, driving for BMW Team Teo Martín in the International GT Open series. He finished runner-up for the 2016 Championship.

== Racing career ==
=== Early career ===
After winning the American Stars of Karting competition in 2005, Yacamán moved immediately to the Spanish Formula Three Championship for the 2006 season, a significant jump for a young driver. He finished 16th in the championship. He also competed in Master Junior Formula in Europe and finished fourth. The following year, Yacamán captured his first win and finished eighth in Spanish Formula Three. In 2008, he captured another win and finished ninth in Spanish F3.

=== Indy Lights ===
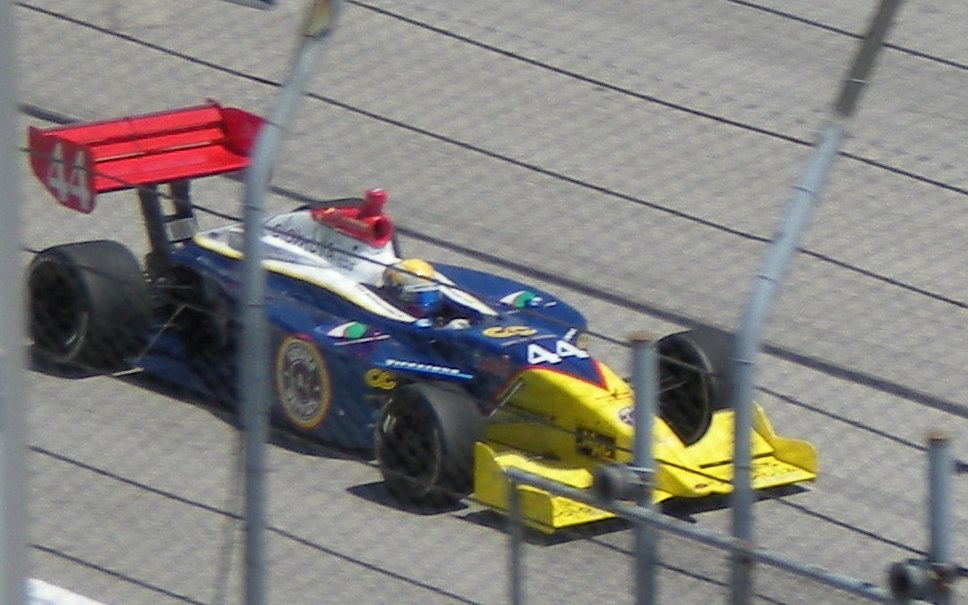
Yacamán racing at the Milwaukee Mile in 2009

For 2009, Yacamán returned to the U.S. to race in the Firestone Indy Lights Series with Sam Schmidt Motorsports. He finished twelfth in points with a best finish of fourth at the Milwaukee Mile. He returned to the series in 2010 with the rookie team Cape Motorsports with Wayne Taylor Racing. Yacamán improved to tenth in points and captured his first podium finish with a third place at Toronto. He returned to the series in 2011 for a third season, this time with Team Moore Racing. He captured his first win late in the season at Baltimore and finished fourth in points. Yacamán achieved his first Indy Lights pole position at the 2012 Firestone Freedom 100. He finished the season third in points with two wins (at Detroit and Toronto) and three runner-up finishes.

=== Sports cars ===
For 2013, Yacamán moved to sports car racing after having raced in the 24 Hours of Daytona the previous year, driving the No. 6 Ford-Riley Daytona Prototype entry for Michael Shank Racing in the Rolex Sports Car Series Yacamán caused a great deal of controversy during the 2013 race at Detroit's Belle Isle. On the first lap of the race Yacaman was trying to make a move inside of Memo Rojas but ran wide, pushing Rojas' car off-line and into a concrete barrier. The incident caused significant damage to Rojas' car, and also collected Yacamán's teammate John Pew. As a result of the incident Rojas and His teammate Scott Pruett did not accrue any points for the race which put them at a severe disadvantage for the Championship. In the course of the season, Yacamán managed a best finish of second place at Lime Rock, to finish eleventh in the championship.

For 2014, Yacamán has joined the newly unified United SportsCar Championship with OAK Racing; first with a Morgan LMP2-Nissan and then with a Ligier JS P2-Honda, managed to win at Mosport Park, and three podiums, so that ended eighth in the drivers' championship Prototype class.

Yacamán became a junior Lamborghini factory driver in 2017, and would compete at the Blancpain GT Series for Team Lazarus.

== Racing record ==
=== American open–wheel racing results ===
(key)

==== Indy Lights ====
Year	Team	1	2	3	4	5	6	7	8	9	10	11	12	13	14	15	Rank	Points	Ref
2009	Sam Schmidt Motorsports	STP1; 12	STP2; 9	LBH; 9	KAN; 17	INDY; 18	MIL; 4	IOW; 5	WGL; 7	TOR; 8	EDM; 16	KTY; 19	MOH; 10	SNM; 19	CHI	HMS; 16	**12th**	**269**	
2010	Cape Motorsports Wayne Taylor Racing	STP; 5	ALA; 9	LBH; 14	INDY; 11	IOW; 11	WGL; 8	TOR; 3	EDM; 9	MOH; 15	SNM; 4	CHI; 15	KTY; 5	HMS; 16			**10th**	**293**	
2011	Team Moore Racing	STP; 14	ALA; 12	LBH; 4	INDY; 15	MIL; 5	IOW; 2	TOR; 3	EDM1; 5	EDM2; 16	TRO; 2	NHM; 4	BAL; 1	KTY; 11	LVS; 4		**4th**	**403**	
2012	Team Moore Racing	STP; 6	ALA; 4	LBH; 10	**INDY**; 4	DET; 1	MIL; 8	IOW; 2	TOR; 1	EDM; 7	TRO; 2	BAL; 2	FON; 11				**3rd**	**394**	

=== WeatherTech SportsCar Championship results ===
(key)(Races in bold indicate pole position, Results are overall/class)

Year	Team	Make	Engine	Class	1	2	3	4	5	6	7	8	9	10	11	Rank	Points	Ref
2014	OAK Racing	P	Morgan LMP2	Nissan VK45DE 4.5 L V8	DAY; 6	SIR; 4	LBH; 4	LS; 8	DET; 3	S6H; 2	MSP; 1	IMS; 8	ELK; 11			5th	287	
2014	OAK Racing	P	Ligier JS P2	Honda HR28TT 2.8 L V6 Turbo										COA; 2	PET; 9	5th	287	
2018	AFS/PR1 Mathiasen Motorsports	P	Ligier JS P217	Gibson GK428 4.2 L V8	DAY; 12	SEB; 11	LBH; 11	MOH; 6	DET; 8	WGL; 9	MOS; 9	ELK; 13				15th	192	
2018	AFS/PR1 Mathiasen Motorsports	P	Oreca 07	Gibson GK428 4.2 L V8									LGA; 8	PET		15th	192	

=== 24 Hours of Le Mans results ===
Year	Team	Co-Drivers	Car	Class	Laps	Pos.	Class Pos.
2015	(Russia) G-Drive Racing	(Mexico) Ricardo González (Brazil) Pipo Derani	Ligier JS P2-Nissan	LMP2	354	12th	4th

=== Complete FIA World Endurance Championship results ===
Year	Entrant	Class	Car	Engine	1	2	3	4	5	6	7	8	Rank	Points
2015	G-Drive Racing	LMP2	Ligier JS P2	Nissan VK45DE 4.5 L V8	**SIL**; 2	SPA; 1	LMS; 3	NÜR; 3	COA; 3	FUJ; 3	SHA; Ret	BHR; 3	3rd	134

=== Complete Blancpain GT Series Sprint Cup results ===
Year	Team	Car	Class	1	2	3	4	5	6	7	8	9	10	Pos.	Points	Ref
2017	Orange 1 Team Lazarus	Lamborghini Huracán GT3	Pro	MIS; QR; 15	MIS; CR; 17	BRH; QR; 21	BRH; CR; 15	ZOL; QR; 29	ZOL; CR; Ret	HUN; QR	HUN; CR	NÜR; QR	NÜR; CR	NC	0	

=== Complete Global Rallycross Championship results ===
(key)

==== GRC Lites ====
Year	Entrant	Car	1	2	3	4	5	6	7	8	9	10	11	12	Lites	Points
2017	AF Racing	Lites Ford Fiesta	MEM	LOU; 3	THO1	THO2	OTT1	OTT2	INDY	AC1	AC2	SEA1	SEA2	LA	13th	60
