= Máximo Cortés =

Spanish racing driver (born 1988)

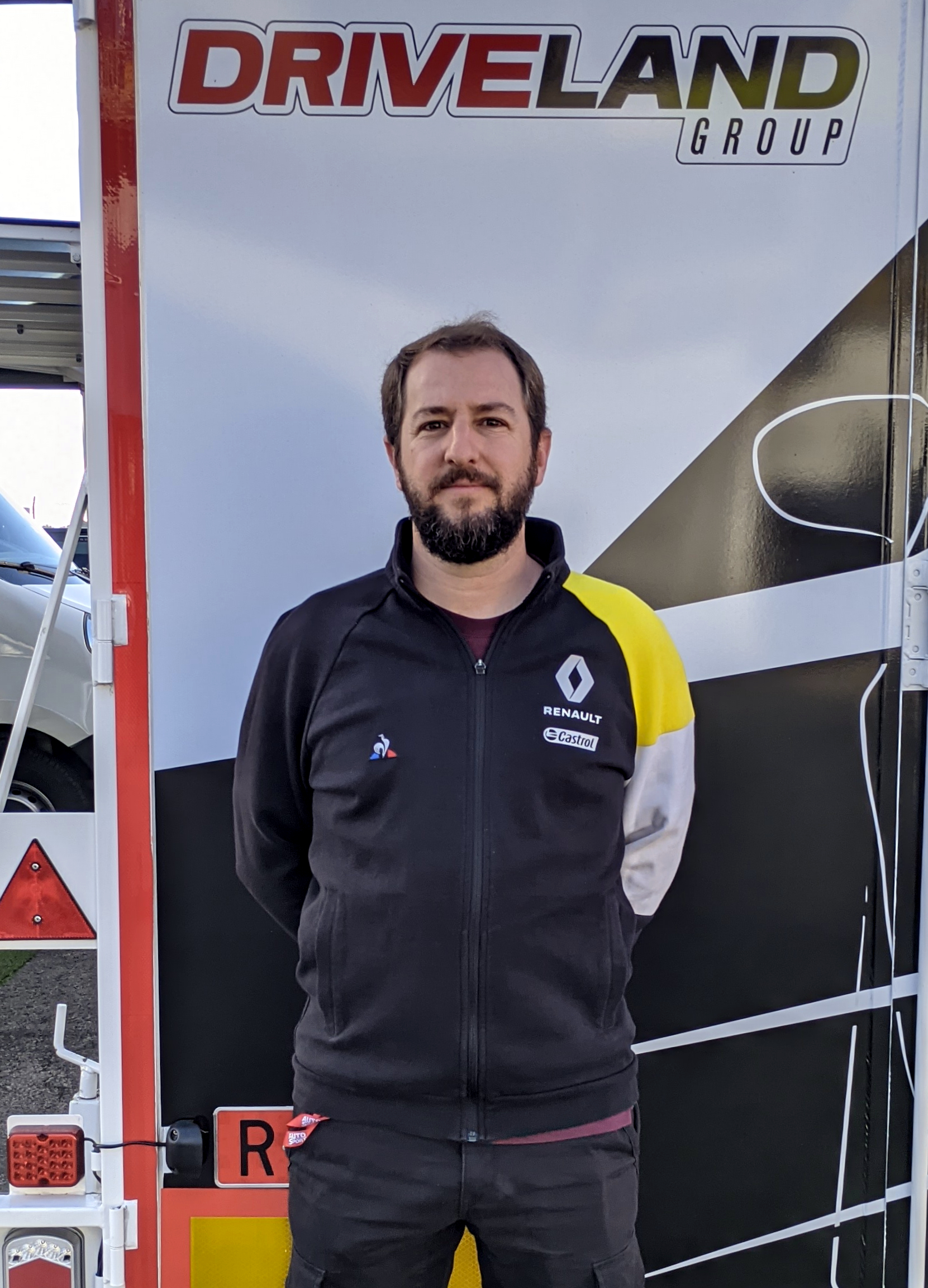
- Cortés in 2024
- Nationality: (Spain) Spanish
- Born: Máximo Cortés Chávarri; 13 April 1988 (age 38) Móstoles, Madrid (Spain)

Le Mans Series career
- Debut season: 2009
- Current team: MIK Corse
- Categorisation: FIA Gold (until 2019); FIA Silver (2020–)
- Car number: 23
- Starts: 3
- Wins: 0
- Poles: 0
- Fastest laps: 0

Previous series
- 2005 2006-2007 2008 2009 2010: Master Junior Formula; Spanish Formula Three; Formula Renault 3.5 Series; LeMans Series; Championship of Spain Gran Turismo - Spanish Resistance Cup - Superleague Formula

Championship titles
- 2007: Spanish Formula Three

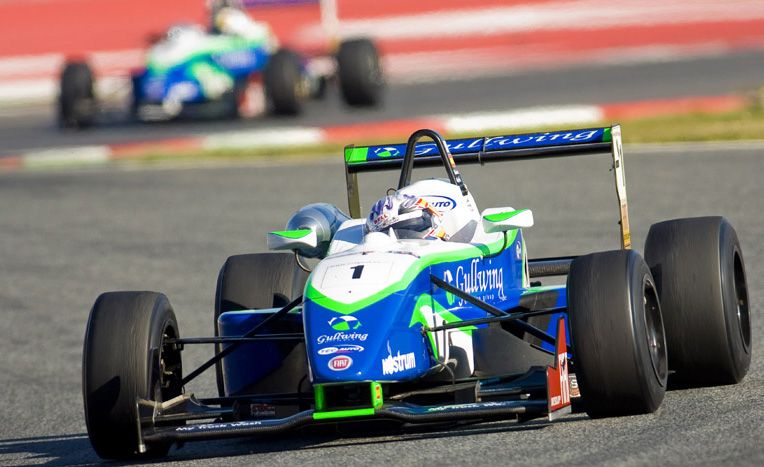

Máximo Cortés Chávarri (born 13 April 1988 in Móstoles, Madrid) is a Spanish former racing driver.

== Career ==
=== Formula Three ===
After a first successful season in the Master Junior Formula, finishing the season as runner-up, Cortés graduated to the Spanish Formula Three Championship in 2006 with Spanish team Escuderia TEC-Auto. A strong third place in the standings in his rookie year boosted him as the favourite for the following season.

Cortés continued with TEC Auto into the 2007 season. During the season, he took nine podiums, including six race wins, to win the drivers' title ahead of his teammate Marco Barba, winning the title by just four points.

=== World Series by Renault ===
In 2008, Cortés signed with Pons Racing in order to participate in the Formula Renault 3.5 Series alongside fellow Spanish Formula Three teammate Marcos Martínez.

After only seven races in the championship, Cortés was replaced by Aleix Alcaraz due to financial problems; during his short stint in the championship, Cortés finished two times in the points positions, a seven in Spa being his best result.

== Racing record ==
Season	Series	Team	Car No.	Races	Poles	Wins	FLaps	Points	Position
2009	Le Mans Series LMP2	(Spain) Q8 Oils Hache Team	43	3	0	0	0	0*	N/A*
2008	Spanish Formula Three	(Spain) emiliodevillota.com	22	2	1	1	0	0	N/A
2008	Formula Renault 3.5 Series	(Spain) Pons Racing	14	7	0	0	0	5	26th
2007	Spanish Formula Three	(Spain) Escuderia TEC-Auto	1	16	4	6	9	117	**1st**
2006	Spanish Formula Three	(Spain) Escuderia TEC-Auto	13	16	2	2	3	93	**3rd**
2005	Master Junior Formula	(Spain) Escuela de Pilotos Emilio de Villota		20		10		469	**2nd**

- * Season still in progress

=== Complete Formula Renault 3.5 Series results ===
(key) (Races in bold indicate pole position) (Races in italics indicate fastest lap)

Year	Team	1	2	3	4	5	6	7	8	9	10	11	12	13	14	15	16	17	Pos	Points
2008	Pons Racing	MNZ; 1; 17	MNZ; 2; 16	SPA; 1; 7	SPA; 2; 13	MON; 1; 10	SIL; 1; 14	SIL; 2; 17	HUN; 1	HUN; 2	NÜR; 1	NÜR; 2	LMS; 1	LMS; 2	EST; 1	EST; 2	CAT; 1	CAT; 2	26th	5

Sporting positions
Preceded by Ricardo Risatti	Spanish Formula Three Champion; 2007	Succeeded by Germán Sánchez
