= Escuderia TEC-Auto =

(Spain) Escuderia TEC-Auto
- Founded: 2003
- Team principal(s): José Aurelio Novoa
- Former series: Spanish F3
- Teams' Championships: 2007 Spanish F3
- Drivers' Championships: 2006 Spanish F3 (Risatti); 2007 Spanish F3 (Cortés)

Escuderia TEC-Auto is a racing team from Spain. It was founded in 2003 after the acquisition by Carlos Cosidó and Paul South of the Azteca Motor Sport. In 2004 the team changed its name and appears for the first time with the denomination of TEC Auto. That year the drivers were the Argentinian Ricardo Risatti and the Dutch Ferdinand Kool.

The 2006 was the year of the first title thanks to the Argentinian Risatti, but the team still failed the victory in the Teams Championship, coming second, only behind Racing Engineering. In 2007 the team repeat victory in the Drivers Championship, this time with the Spanish Máximo Cortés and finally the team win the Teams Championship.

For the 2008 season, TEC Auto will still focus exclusively on the Spanish Formula 3, but with the aim of major competitions, such like GP2 Series.

== Results ==
=== Spanish Formula 3 ===
Spanish Formula Three results
Year	Car	Drivers	Races	Wins	Poles	FLaps	Points	D.C.	T.C.
2004	Dallara F300-Toyota	(Netherlands) Ferdinand Kool	13	0	0	0	12	13th	5th
2004	Dallara F300-Toyota	(Argentina) Ricardo Risatti	14	0	0	0	50	5th	5th
2004	Dallara F300-Toyota	(Uruguay) Juan Cáceres	6	0	0	0	10	14th	5th
2005	Dallara F305-Toyota	(Peru) Juan Manuel Polar	7	0	0	0	7	13th	6th
2005	Dallara F300-Toyota	(Spain) Carlos Alvarez	4	0	0	0	28	18th	6th
2005	Dallara F300-Toyota	(Spain) Carlos Cosidó	8	0	0	0	4	18th	6th
2006	Dallara F305-Toyota	(Spain) Máximo Cortés	16	2	2	3	93	3rd	2nd
2006	Dallara F305-Toyota	(Argentina) Ricardo Risatti	16	5	3	7	117	1st	2nd
2006	Dallara F300-Toyota	(Spain) Iago Rego	10	0	0	0	2	19th	2nd
2006	Dallara F300-Toyota	(Spain) Alby Ramirez	2	0	0	0	0	N/A	2nd
2006	Dallara F300-Toyota	(Spain) Carlos Cosidó	16	0	0	0	0	N/A	2nd
2007	Dallara F306-Fiat	(Spain) Máximo Cortés	16	6	4	9	117	1st	1st
2007	Dallara F306-Fiat	(Spain) Marco Barba	16	3	0	0	113	2nd	1st
2007	Dallara F306-Fiat	(Andorra) Manuel Cerqueda Jr.	16	0	0	0	66	6th	1st
2007	Dallara F306-Fiat	(Spain) Marcos Martinez Ucha	4	0	0	0	14	13th	1st
2007	Dallara F306-Fiat	(Portugal) Francisco Villar	4	0	0	0	0	N/A	1st
2008	Dallara F308-Fiat	(Spain) Víctor García							
2008	Dallara F308-Fiat	(Colombia) Gustavo Yacamán							
2008	Dallara F308-Fiat	(Spain) Bruno Méndez							
2008	Dallara F306-Fiat	(Spain) Toño Fernández							

- D.C. = Drivers' Championship position, T.C. = Teams' Championship position.

== Timeline ==
Type	2000s
Type	03	04	05	06	07	08
Formulas	Spanish Formula Three Championship
