= Adrián Campos Jr. =

Spanish racing driver

- Nationality: (Spain) Spanish
- Born: Adrián Campos-Suñer Torres; 5 October 1988 (age 38) Valencia (Spain)
- Relatives: Adrián Campos (father)

Indy Lights
- Years active: 2010
- Car number: 22
- Former teams: Team Moore Racing
- Starts: 13
- Wins: 0
- Poles: 0
- Fastest laps: 1
- Best finish: 6th in 2010

Previous series
- 2005-2009: European F3 Open Championship (Spanish F3)

Adrián Campos-Suñer Torres (born 5 October 1988 in Valencia) is a former Spanish racing driver who is now the team principal of Campos Racing on the European FIA ladder.

Campos has competed in such series as the European F3 Open Championship (formerly the Spanish Formula Three Championship). He signed to compete in the 2010 Indy Lights season in the United States. Campos finished sixth in points with a best finish of fourth three times, including back-to-back oval races to close out the season, and had the fastest lap of the race at Kentucky Speedway. He placed second among rookie competitors, only behind series champion Jean-Karl Vernay.

== Racing record ==
=== American open-wheel racing results ===
(key) (Races in bold indicate pole position) (Races in italics indicate fastest lap)

==== Indy Lights ====
Year	Team	1	2	3	4	5	6	7	8	9	10	11	12	13	Rank	Points	Ref
2010	Team Moore Racing	STP; 16	ALA; 13	LBH; 15	INDY; 10	IOW; 4	WGL; 7	TOR; 13	EDM; 8	MOH; 6	SNM; 7	CHI; 8	KTY; 4	HMS; 4	**6th**	**307**	

=== Complete Auto GP Results ===
(key)

Year	Entrant	1	2	3	4	5	6	7	8	9	10	11	12	13	14	Pos	Points
2011	Campos Racing	MNZ; 1 DNS	MNZ; 2 DNS	HUN; 1	HUN; 2	BRN; 1	BRN; 2	DON; 1 DNS	DON; 2; 9	OSC; 1; 5	OSC; 2; 11	VAL; 1; 9	VAL; 2; 15	MUG; 1	MUG; 2	16th	12
