= Nil Montserrat =

Spanish racing driver (born 1988)

- Nationality: Spanish
- Born: Nil Montserrat Simó; 8 December 1988 (age 37) Barcelona (Spain)

European F3 Open Championship career
- Current team: Q8 Oils Hache Team
- Car number: 27

Nil Montserrat Simó (born 8 December 1988 in Barcelona) is a Spanish racing driver and coach. He has competed in such series as Formula Renault 3.5 Series and the European F3 Open Championship. In 2017, his namesake NM Racing team were the overall winners at 24 Hours of Barcelona.

In 2023, after an hiatus, Montserrat joined to Iberian Supercars Endurance to drive a Mercedes-AMG GT4 for his own team, NM Racing Team. Teaming up with Alberto de Martin, he finished second in the GT4 Bronze division.
