= GTA Motor Competición =

Spanish racing team

(Spain) GTA Motor Competición
- Founded: 1998
- Folded: 2009
- Team principal(s): Domingo Ochoa
- Former series: Superleague Formula; European F3 Open; Spanish GT Championship; International GT Open

GTA Motor Competición was a Spanish racing team based in Torrent, Valencia, Spain.

== History ==
They have competed in many series including Superleague Formula and European F3 Open Championship. Many top drivers have driven for the team including former Formula One driver Jaime Alguersuari.

For the 2008 Superleague Formula season the team operated the Sevilla FC and Tottenham Hotspur. They won 1 race in the 2008 Donington Park Superleague Formula round with driver Borja García in the Sevilla car.

Its founder, Domingo Ochoa, has also founded GTA Motor, a company which designs and builds street-legal sports cars. Their first model is the GTA Spano.

== Results ==
=== Superleague Formula ===
Year	Car	Teams	Races	Wins	Poles	Fast laps	Points	T.C.
2008	Panoz DP09-Menard	(Spain) Sevilla FC	12	1	0	0	262	10th
2008	Panoz DP09-Menard	(England) Tottenham Hotspur	12	0	0	0	257	11th
