= 2005 Masters of Formula 3 =

Race details
Date	12 June 2005
Official name	Marlboro Masters of Formula 3
Location	Circuit Park Zandvoort, Netherlands
Course	4.307 km (2.676 mi)
Distance	25 laps, 107.675 km (66.906 mi)

Pole
Driver	(United Kingdom) Lewis Hamilton	ASM Formule 3
Time	1:31.175

Fastest Lap
Driver	(United Kingdom) Lewis Hamilton	ASM Formule 3
Time	1:32.866 (on lap 9 of 25)

Podium
First	(United Kingdom) Lewis Hamilton	ASM Formule 3
Second	(Germany) Adrian Sutil	ASM Formule 3
Third	(Brazil) Lucas di Grassi	Manor Motorsport

The 2005 Marlboro Masters of Formula 3 was the fifteenth Masters of Formula 3 race held at Circuit Park Zandvoort on 12 June 2005. It was won by Lewis Hamilton, for ASM Formule 3.

== Drivers and teams ==
2005 Entry List
Team	No	Driver	Chassis	Engine	Main series
(France) ASM Formule 3	1	(United Kingdom) Lewis Hamilton	Dallara F305	Mercedes	Formula 3 Euro Series
(France) ASM Formule 3	2	(Germany) Adrian Sutil	Dallara F305	Mercedes	Formula 3 Euro Series
(United Kingdom) Hitech Racing	3	(Estonia) Marko Asmer	Dallara F305	Mugen-Honda	British Formula 3
(United Kingdom) Hitech Racing	4	(Spain) Álvaro Barba	Dallara F305	Mugen-Honda	Spanish Formula Three
(Belgium) JB Motorsport	5	(Netherlands) Ferdinand Kool	Lola B05/30	Mugen-Honda	Recaro Formel 3 Cup
(Belgium) JB Motorsport	6	(China) Ho-Pin Tung	Dallara F305	Mugen-Honda	Recaro Formel 3 Cup
(Belgium) JB Motorsport	7	(United Kingdom) Steven Kane	Lola B05/30	Mugen-Honda	British Formula 3
(United Kingdom) Fortec Motorsport	8	(United Kingdom) Mike Conway	Dallara F305	Opel	British Formula 3
(United Kingdom) Fortec Motorsport	9	(United Kingdom) James Walker	Dallara F305	Opel	British Formula 3
(United Kingdom) Fortec Motorsport	11	(Republic of Ireland) Ronayne O'Mahony	Dallara F305	Opel	British Formula 3
(France) Signature-Plus	12	(United Kingdom) James Rossiter	Dallara F305	Opel	Formula 3 Euro Series
(France) Signature-Plus	15	(France) Loïc Duval	Dallara F305	Opel	Formula 3 Euro Series
(France) Signature	14	(France) Guillaume Moreau	Dallara F305	Opel	Formula 3 Euro Series
(Luxembourg) Team Midland Euroseries	18	(Argentina) Esteban Guerrieri	Dallara F305	Toyota	Formula 3 Euro Series
(Luxembourg) Team Midland Euroseries	19	(Belgium) Nico Verdonck	Dallara F305	Toyota	Formula 3 Euro Series
(United Kingdom) Carlin Motorsport	20	(Portugal) Álvaro Parente	Dallara F305	Mugen-Honda	British Formula 3
(United Kingdom) Carlin Motorsport	21	(Denmark) Christian Bakkerud	Dallara F305	Mugen-Honda	British Formula 3
(United Kingdom) Carlin Motorsport	22	(Japan) Keiko Ihara	Dallara F305	Mugen-Honda	British Formula 3
(United Kingdom) Carlin Motorsport	23	(United States) Charlie Kimball	Dallara F305	Mugen-Honda	British Formula 3
(United Kingdom) Manor Motorsport	24	(Brazil) Lucas di Grassi	Dallara F305	Mercedes	Formula 3 Euro Series
(United Kingdom) Manor Motorsport	25	(United Kingdom) Paul di Resta	Dallara F305	Mercedes	Formula 3 Euro Series
(Germany) Team Rosberg	26	(Netherlands) Giedo van der Garde	Dallara F305	Opel	Formula 3 Euro Series
(Germany) Team Rosberg	27	(Japan) Kohei Hirate	Dallara F305	Opel	Formula 3 Euro Series
(Austria) HBR Motorsport	29	(Austria) Hannes Neuhauser	Dallara F305	Mercedes	Formula 3 Euro Series
(Austria) HBR Motorsport	30	(Spain) Alejandro Núñez	Dallara F305	Opel	Formula 3 Euro Series
(United Kingdom) Räikkönen Robertson Racing	32	(Brazil) Bruno Senna	Dallara F305	Mugen-Honda	British Formula 3
(United Kingdom) Räikkönen Robertson Racing	33	(United Kingdom) Dan Clarke	Dallara F305	Mugen-Honda	British Formula 3
(Germany) ASL Mücke Motorsport	34	(Germany) Sebastian Vettel	Dallara F305	Mercedes	Formula 3 Euro Series
(Germany) ASL Mücke Motorsport	35	(Brazil) Átila Abreu	Dallara F305	Mercedes	Formula 3 Euro Series
(Netherlands) Ross Zwolsman	37	(Netherlands) Ross Zwolsman	Dallara F305	Opel	Formula 3 Euro Series
(Italy) Prema Powerteam	38	(France) Franck Perera	Dallara F305	Opel	Formula 3 Euro Series
(Italy) Prema Powerteam	39	(Italy) Marco Bonanomi	Dallara F305	Opel	Formula 3 Euro Series
(Italy) Prema Powerteam	40	(Belgium) Greg Franchi	Dallara F305	Opel	Formula 3 Euro Series
(United Kingdom) Menu F3 Motorsport	41	(United Kingdom) Stephen Jelley	Dallara F305	Opel	British Formula 3
(United Kingdom) T-Sport	42	(United Kingdom) Ryan Lewis	Dallara F305	Mugen-Honda	British Formula 3
(Germany) AM-Holzer Rennsport	43	(Germany) Thomas Holzer	Dallara F305	Opel	Formula 3 Euro Series

== Classification ==
=== Race ===
Pos	No	Driver	Team	Laps	Time/Retired	Grid
1	1	(United Kingdom) Lewis Hamilton	ASM Formule 3	25	0:39:28.565	1
2	2	(Germany) Adrian Sutil	ASM Formule 3	25	+6.477	2
3	24	(Brazil) Lucas di Grassi	Manor Motorsport	25	+7.254	4
4	25	(United Kingdom) Paul di Resta	Manor Motorsport	25	+8.068	3
5	27	(Japan) Kohei Hirate	Team Rosberg	25	+26.917	5
6	26	(Netherlands) Giedo van der Garde	Team Rosberg	25	+30.950	8
7	3	(Estonia) Marko Asmer	Hitech Racing	25	+31.533	13
8	38	(France) Franck Perera	Prema Powerteam	25	+32.156	6
9	29	(Austria) Hannes Neuhauser	HBR Motorsport	25	+33.656	11
10	15	(France) Loïc Duval	Signature-Plus	25	+34.582	9
11	34	(Germany) Sebastian Vettel	ASL Mücke Motorsport	25	+35.134	14
12	23	(United States) Charlie Kimball	Carlin Motorsport	25	+35.404	15
13	8	(United Kingdom) Mike Conway	Fortec Motorsport	25	+36.069	16
14	14	(France) Guillaume Moreau	Signature	25	+36.309	20
15	35	(Brazil) Átila Abreu	ASL Mücke Motorsport	25	+43.269	23
16	6	(China) Ho-Pin Tung	JB Motorsport	25	+50.283	22
17	37	(Netherlands) Ross Zwolsman	Ross Zwolsman	25	+50.875	25
18	39	(Italy) Marco Bonanomi	Prema Powerteam	25	+52.985	7
19	41	(United Kingdom) Stephen Jelley	Menu F3 Motorsport	25	+1:02.331	29
20	19	(Belgium) Nico Verdonck	Team Midland Euroseries	25	+1:07.292	35
21	40	(Belgium) Greg Franchi	Prema Powerteam	25	+1:07.548	34
22	43	(Germany) Thomas Holzer	AM-Holzer Rennsport	25	+1:25.062	31
23	11	(Republic of Ireland) Ronayne O'Mahony	Fortec Motorsport	25	+1:26.899	33
24	4	(Spain) Alvaro Barba	Hitech Racing	24	+1 Lap	30
25	22	(Japan) Keiko Ihara	Carlin Motorsport	24	+1 Lap	32
Ret	30	(Spain) Alejandro Nunez	HBR Motorsport	15	Retired	24
Ret	20	(Portugal) Alvaro Parente	Carlin Motorsport	12	Retired	10
Ret	21	(Denmark) Christian Bakkerud	Carlin Motorsport	10	Retired	17
Ret	9	(United Kingdom) James Walker	Fortec Motorsport	10	Retired	19
Ret	12	(United Kingdom) James Rossiter	Signature-Plus	5	Retired	26
Ret	32	(Brazil) Bruno Senna	Räikkönen Robertson Racing	4	Retired	18
Ret	18	(Argentina) Esteban Guerrieri	Team Midland Euroseries	2	Retired	12
Ret	33	(United Kingdom) Dan Clarke	Räikkönen Robertson Racing	2	Retired	21
Ret	42	(United Kingdom) Ryan Lewis	T-Sport	1	Retired	28
Ret	5	(Netherlands) Ferdinand Kool	JB Motorsport	1	Retired	27
Fastest lap: Lewis Hamilton, 1:32.866, 166.963 km/h (103.746 mph) on lap 9

== See also ==
- 2005 Formula 3 Euro Series season
- 2005 British Formula 3 season
