= 2004 Spanish Formula Three Championship =

Motor racing competition

Seasons
- ← 2003 2005 →

The 2004 Spanish Formula Three Championship was the fourth Spanish Formula Three season. It began on 25 April at Albacete and ended on 14 November at Circuit de Catalunya in Montmeló after fourteen races. Borja García was crowned series champion.

== Teams and drivers ==
- All teams were Spanish-registered. All cars were powered by Toyota engines, Dallara F300 chassis and Dunlop tyres.

Team	No.	Driver	Rounds
Racing Engineering	1	(Spain) Borja García	All
Racing Engineering	2	(United Kingdom) Steven Kane	All
Racing Engineering	3	(Spain) Maria de Villota	1–5, 7
Racing Engineering	3	(Spain) Emilio de Villota Jr.	6
GTA Motor Competición	4	(Spain) Jorge Garrido	5, 7
GTA Motor Competición	5	(Portugal) Manuel Giao	All
GTA Motor Competición	6	(Spain) Alejandro Núñez	1–3
GTA Motor Competición	6	(Spain) Marco Barba	5
GTA Motor Competición	6	(Spain) Andy Soucek	7
ECA Racing	7	(Uruguay) Juan Cáceres	1–2
ECA Racing	7	(Spain) José Manuel Pérez-Aicart	4–7
ECA Racing	8	(Spain) Roc Mas	All
ECA Racing	9	(Spain) Fernando Navarrete	1
ECA Racing	9	(Spain) Manuel Sáez Merino Jr.	All
EV Racing	10	(Spain) Javier Villa	1–4
EV Racing	11	(Spain) Christian Cano	1
EV Racing	12	(Spain) Andy Soucek	1–6
EV Racing	12	(Republic of Ireland) Ronayne O'Mahony	7
BCN F3 Team	14	(Argentina) Matias Milla	All
JV – Elide Racing	15	(Spain) Javier Villa	5–7
Adrián Campos Motorsport	16	(Italy) Giacommo Piccini	1–3
Adrián Campos Motorsport	16	(Spain) Roldán Rodríguez	4–7
Adrián Campos Motorsport	17	(Spain) Sergio Hernández	All
Adrián Campos Motorsport	18	(Spain) Álvaro Barba	All
Adrián Campos Motorsport	19	(Spain) Daniel Martín	1–6
Adrián Campos Motorsport	19	(Spain) Marco Barba	7
CLM Motorsport†; Meycom Sport	20	(Spain) Víctor Jaouen	1
CLM Motorsport†; Meycom Sport	20	(Spain) Alejandro Núñez	4–7
CLM Motorsport†; Meycom Sport	21	(Spain) Héctor Suárez	1–3, 5
CLM Motorsport†; Meycom Sport	21	(Spain) Celso Míguez	7
IGI Tec-Auto	22	(Netherlands) Ferdinand Kool	All
IGI Tec-Auto	23	(Argentina) Ricardo Risatti	All
IGI Tec-Auto	27	(Uruguay) Juan Cáceres	5–7

† From the second round, CLM Motorsport retired and were purchased by Meycom Sport.

== Calendar ==
Round		Circuit	Date	Pole position	Fastest lap	Winning driver	Winning team
1	R1	(Spain) Circuito de Albacete, Albacete	25 April	(Spain) Borja García	(Spain) Borja García	(Spain) Borja García	Racing Engineering
1	R2	(Spain) Circuito de Albacete, Albacete	25 April	(Portugal) Manuel Gião	(Portugal) Manuel Gião	(Spain) Borja García	Racing Engineering
2	R1	(Spain) Circuito del Jarama, Madrid	23 May	(United Kingdom) Steven Kane	(United Kingdom) Steven Kane	(United Kingdom) Steven Kane	Racing Engineering
2	R2	(Spain) Circuito del Jarama, Madrid	23 May	(Portugal) Manuel Gião	(Portugal) Manuel Gião	(Portugal) Manuel Gião	GTA Motor Competición
3	R1	(Spain) Circuito de Jerez, Jerez de la Frontera	6 June	(Spain) Borja García	(Spain) Borja García	(Spain) Borja García	Racing Engineering
3	R2	(Spain) Circuito de Jerez, Jerez de la Frontera	6 June	(Spain) Daniel Martín	(United Kingdom) Steven Kane	(Portugal) Manuel Gião	GTA Motor Competición
4	R1	(Portugal) Autódromo do Estoril, Estoril	27 June	(Spain) Borja García	(Spain) Borja García	(Spain) Borja García	Racing Engineering
4	R2	(Portugal) Autódromo do Estoril, Estoril	27 June	(Spain) Borja García	(Spain) Borja García	(Spain) Borja García	Racing Engineering
5	R1	(Spain) Circuit Ricardo Tormo, Valencia	14 September	(Spain) Borja García	(Portugal) Manuel Gião	(Portugal) Manuel Gião	GTA Motor Competición
5	R2	(Spain) Circuit Ricardo Tormo, Valencia	14 September	(Portugal) Manuel Gião	(Spain) Borja García	(Spain) Borja García	Racing Engineering
6	R1	(Spain) Circuito de Jerez, Jerez de la Frontera	10 October	(Spain) Borja García	(Spain) Borja García	(Spain) Borja García	Racing Engineering
6	R2	(Spain) Circuito de Jerez, Jerez de la Frontera	10 October	(Spain) Borja García	(Spain) Borja García	(Spain) Borja García	Racing Engineering
7	R1	(Spain) Circuit de Catalunya, Barcelona	14 November	(Spain) Borja García	(Spain) Borja García	(Spain) Borja García	Racing Engineering
7	R2	(Spain) Circuit de Catalunya, Barcelona	14 November	(Spain) Andy Soucek (Note: Pole position recorded by Celso Míguez and he started from first grid position, but he was ineligible to score the pole position point.)	(Spain) Andy Soucek	(Spain) José Manuel Pérez-Aicart	ECA Racing

== Standings ==
=== Drivers' standings ===
- Points were awarded as follows:

1	2	3	4	5	6	7	8	9	PP	FL
12	10	8	6	5	4	3	2	1	**1**	1

Pos	Driver	ALB (Spain)		JAR (Spain)		JER (Spain)		EST (Portugal)		VAL (Spain)		JER (Spain)		CAT (Spain)		Pts
1	(Spain) Borja García	**1**	1	13	6	**1**	2	**1**	**1**	**9**	1	**1**	**1**	**1**	4	149
2	(Portugal) Manuel Gião	5	**2**	3	**1**	2	1	2	2	1	**2**	5	5	2	8	131
3	(United Kingdom) Steven Kane	2	DNS	**1**	2	7	3	3	3	3	8	3	4	5	6	100
4	(Spain) Andy Soucek	6	Ret	2	3	9	6	4	4	5	7	2	Ret	8	**2**	74
5	(Argentina) Ricardo Risatti	4	3	12	4	4	4	8	12	4	10†	10	Ret	7	7	50
6	(Spain) Sergio Hernández	19	5	4	DNS	6	11	5	Ret	8	5	7	3	Ret	Ret	41
7	(Spain) Daniel Martín	11	4	14†	5	Ret	7	Ret	10	2	3	15	9			35
8	(Spain) Álvaro Barba	3	Ret	Ret	Ret	3	5	NC	Ret	10	6	Ret	6	16	15†	31
9	(Spain) Javier Villa	13	7	6	Ret	11	10	7	14	7	Ret	6	Ret	4	9	29
10	(Spain) Alejandro Núñez	16	Ret	8	11	5	8	10	5	14	Ret	13	13	6	5	27
11	(Spain) Roldán Rodríguez							11	9	6	4	9	11	11	11	16
12	(Spain) María de Villota	8	9	5	8	Ret	Ret	13†	7	12	Ret			Ret	Ret	13
13	(Netherlands) Ferdinand Kool	10	DNS	9	7	Ret	Ret	12†	11	11	Ret	8	8	9	Ret	12
14	(Uruguay) Juan Cáceres	12	Ret	10	9	Ret	Ret	6	13	Ret	Ret	11	7	10	Ret	10
15	(Argentina) Matías Milla	14	Ret	11	12	8	Ret	14†	6	13	Ret	12	Ret	DNS	DNS	6
16	(Spain) Victor Jaouen	18	6													4
17	(Spain) Roc Mas	17	10	Ret	10	Ret	12	9	8	DNS	9	14†	12	Ret	Ret	4
18	(Spain) Fernando Navarrete	7	Ret													3
19	(Italy) Giacommo Piccini	15	Ret	7	13	Ret	DNS									3
20	(Spain) Christian Cano	Ret	8													2
21	(Spain) Héctor Suárez	9	11	Ret	14	10	9			15	Ret					2
Guest driver ineligible for points
	(Spain) José Manuel Pérez-Aicart											4	2	3	1	0
	(Spain) Celso Míguez													15†	3	0
	(Spain) Manuel Sáez Merino Jr.													14	10	0
	(Spain) Emilio de Villota Jr.											Ret	10			0
	(Spain) Jorge Garrido									16	Ret			12	13	0
	(Republic of Ireland) Ronayne O'Mahony													13	12	0
	(Spain) Marco Barba									DSQ	NC			Ret	14	0
Pos	Driver	ALB (Spain)		JAR (Spain)		JER (Spain)		EST (Portugal)		VAL (Spain)		JER (Spain)		CAT (Spain)		Pts

Colour	Result
Gold	Winner
Silver	Second place
Bronze	Third place
Green	Points classification
Blue	Non-points classification
Blue	Non-classified finish (NC)
Purple	Retired, not classified (Ret)
Red	Did not qualify (DNQ)
Red	Did not pre-qualify (DNPQ)
Black	Disqualified (DSQ)
White	Did not start (DNS)
White	Withdrew (WD)
White	Race cancelled (C)
Blank	Did not practice (DNP)
Blank	Did not arrive (DNA)
Blank	Excluded (EX)

**Bold** – Pole
Italics – Fastest Lap

† — Drivers did not finish the race, but were classified as they completed over 90% of the race distance.

=== Teams' standings ===
Pos	Team	Pts
1	Racing Engineering	179
2	GTA Motor Competición	108
3	Adrián Campos Motorsport	64
4	EV Racing	33
5	IGI TEC-Auto	29
6	Meycom Sport	12
7	JV - Elide Racing	9
8	ECA Racing	0
9	BCN F3 Team	0
10	CLM Motorsport	0

=== Trofeo Ibérico de Fórmula 3 ===
Pos	Driver	Pts
1	(Spain) Borja García	63
2	(Portugal) Manuel Gião	50
3	(Spain) Andy Soucek	37
4	(Spain) Sergio Hernández	31
5	(Spain) Daniel Martín	27
6	(Spain) Roldán Rodríguez	26
7	(Spain) Javier Villa	19
8	(Spain) Roc Mas	16
9	(Spain) Alejandro Núñez	15
10	(Spain) Álvaro Barba	12
