= 2003 Spanish Formula Three Championship =

Motor racing competition

Seasons
- ← 2002 2004 →

The 2003 Spanish Formula Three Championship was the third Spanish Formula Three season. It began on 27 April at Albacete and ended on 9 November at Circuit de Catalunya in Montmeló after thirteen races. Ricardo Maurício was crowned series champion.

== Teams and drivers ==
- All teams were Spanish-registered. All cars were powered by Toyota engines, Dallara F300 chassis and Dunlop tyres.

| Team | No. | Driver | Rounds |
|---|---|---|---|
| EV Racing | 1 | (Spain) Emilio de Villota Jr. | All |
| EV Racing | 2 | (Argentina) Ricardo Risatti | 1–5 |
| EV Racing | 2 | (Spain) Alejandro Núñez | 6 |
| EV Racing | 2 | (Spain) Víctor Ordoñez | 7 |
| EV Racing | 3 | (Spain) Andy Soucek | All |
| Racing Engineering | 4 | (Spain) Pedro Barral | All |
| Racing Engineering | 5 | (Brazil) Ricardo Maurício | All |
| Racing Engineering | 6 | (Germany) Dennis Furchheim | 1–3 |
| Racing Engineering | 6 | (Spain) Juan Antonio del Pino | 4–6 |
| Racing Engineering | 6 | (Belgium) Jan Heylen | 7 |
| Racing Engineering | 7 | (Portugal) Lourenço da Veiga | All |
| Meycom Sport | 8 | (Spain) José Manuel Pérez-Aicart | 1–6 |
| Meycom Sport | 8 | (Spain) Adrián Vallés | 7 |
| Meycom Sport | 9 | (Spain) Álvaro Barba | All |
| ECA Racing | 10 | (Spain) Roc Mas | 5–7 |
| ECA Racing | 11 | (Spain) Daniel Martín | All |
| ECA Racing | 12 | (Spain) Ricardo Ferrando | 1–2 |
| ECA Racing | 12 | (Spain) Roldán Rodríguez | 4–7 |
| GTA Motor Competición | 14 | (Spain) Borja García | All |
| GTA Motor Competición | 15 | (Spain) María de Villota | All |
| GTA Motor Competición | 16 | (Brazil) Angelo Serafim | All |
| Azteca Motorsport | 17 | (Spain) Sergio Hernández | All |
| Azteca Motorsport | 18 | (United Kingdom) Marc McLoughlin | 1 |
| Azteca Motorsport | 18 | (Spain) Alejandro Núñez | 2–5 |
| G-Tec Sport | 19 | (Spain) Victor Ordóñez | 1 |
| G-Tec Sport | 19 | (Finland) Henri Niskanen | 2 |
| G-Tec Sport | 19 | (Spain) Francisco J. Reina | 3 |
| G-Tec Sport | 19 | (Spain) Juan Antonio del Pino | 7 |
| G-Tec Sport | 20 | (Spain) Ángel Romero | 3 |
| Elide Racing | 21 | (Spain) Alejandro Núñez | All |
| Elide Racing | 22 | (Spain) Roldán Rodríguez | 1–3 |
| Elide Racing | 22 | (Argentina) Ricardo Risatti | 6–7 |
| Skualo Competición | 23 | (Spain) Roc Mas | 1–3 |

== Calendar ==
| Round | | Circuit | Date | Pole position | Fastest lap | Winning driver | Winning team |
|---|---|---|---|---|---|---|---|
| 1 | R1 | (Spain) Circuito de Albacete, Albacete | 27 April | (Spain) Borja García | (Spain) Borja García | (Spain) Borja García | GTA Motor Competición |
| 1 | R2 | (Spain) Circuito de Albacete, Albacete | 27 April | (Spain) José Manuel Pérez-Aicart | (Brazil) Angelo Serafim | (Spain) José Manuel Pérez-Aicart | Meycom Sport |
| 2 | R1 | (Spain) Circuito del Jarama, Madrid | 18 May | (Spain) Daniel Martín | (Brazil) Angelo Serafim | (Spain) Daniel Martín | ECA Racing |
| 2 | R2 | (Spain) Circuito del Jarama, Madrid | 18 May | (Spain) José Manuel Pérez-Aicart | (Spain) Pedro Barral | (Spain) José Manuel Pérez-Aicart | Meycom Sport |
| 3 | R1 | (Spain) Circuito de Jerez, Jerez de la Frontera | 31 May | (Spain) Daniel Martín | (Spain) Daniel Martín | (Spain) Daniel Martín | ECA Racing |
| 3 | R2 | (Spain) Circuito de Jerez, Jerez de la Frontera | 31 May | (Brazil) Ricardo Mauricio | (Brazil) Ricardo Mauricio | (Brazil) Ricardo Mauricio | Racing Engineering |
| 4 | R1 | (Portugal) Circuito do Estoril, Estoril | 6 July | (Brazil) Ricardo Mauricio | (Spain) Daniel Martín | (Brazil) Ricardo Mauricio | Racing Engineering |
| 4 | R2 | (Portugal) Circuito do Estoril, Estoril | 6 July | (Brazil) Ricardo Mauricio | (Spain) Daniel Martín | (Brazil) Ricardo Mauricio | Racing Engineering |
| 5 | R1 | (Spain) Circuit Ricardo Tormo, Valencia | 14 September | (Spain) José Manuel Pérez-Aicart | (Spain) José Manuel Pérez-Aicart | (Brazil) Ricardo Mauricio | Racing Engineering |
| 5 | R2 | (Spain) Circuit Ricardo Tormo, Valencia | 14 September | (Spain) Andy Soucek | (Spain) Daniel Martín | (Spain) Borja García | GTA Motor Competición |
| 6 | | (Spain) Circuito de Jerez, Jerez de la Frontera | 12 October | (Brazil) Ricardo Mauricio | (Brazil) Ricardo Mauricio | (Brazil) Ricardo Mauricio | Racing Engineering |
| 7 | R1 | (Spain) Circuit de Catalunya, Barcelona | 10 November | (Spain) Daniel Martín | (Spain) Daniel Martín | (Brazil) Ricardo Mauricio | Racing Engineering |
| 7 | R2 | (Spain) Circuit de Catalunya, Barcelona | 10 November | (Spain) Daniel Martín | (Spain) Daniel Martín | (Spain) Daniel Martín | ECA Racing |

== Standings ==
=== Drivers' standings ===
- Points were awarded as follows:

| Pos | 1 | 2 | 3 | 4 | 5 | 6 | 7 | 8 | 9 | 10 | 11 | 12 | 13 | 14 | 15 | PP | FL |
|---|---|---|---|---|---|---|---|---|---|---|---|---|---|---|---|---|---|
| Pts | 20 | 18 | 16 | 14 | 12 | 10 | 9 | 8 | 7 | 6 | 5 | 4 | 3 | 2 | 1 | **1** | 2 |

| Pos | Driver | ALB (Spain) | | JAR (Spain) | | JER (Spain) | | EST (Portugal) | | VAL (Spain) | | JER (Spain) | CAT (Spain) | | Pts |
|---|---|---|---|---|---|---|---|---|---|---|---|---|---|---|---|
| 1 | (Brazil) Ricardo Maurício | 9 | 4 | Ret | 15 | 3 | **1** | **1** | **1** | 1 | 5 | **1** | 1 | 5 | 190 |
| 2 | (Spain) Daniel Martín | 2 | Ret | **1** | 3 | **1** | 6 | 2 | 2 | 12 | 6 | Ret | **4** | **1** | 184 |
| 3 | (Spain) Borja García | **1** | Ret | 9 | 2 | 8 | 2 | 3 | 5 | 2 | 1 | 4 | 6 | 2 | 182 |
| 4 | (Spain) Andy Soucek | 6 | 2 | 4 | 4 | 4 | 3 | Ret | 7 | 10 | **Ret** | 2 | 5 | 13 | 136 |
| 5 | (Spain) José Manuel Pérez-Aicart | 3 | **1** | Ret | **1** | 2 | 12 | NC | 4 | **13** | 4 | 3 | | | 130 |
| 6 | (Brazil) Angelo Serafim | 8 | 5 | 2 | 6 | 14 | Ret | 4 | 3 | 4 | Ret | Ret | 11 | 9 | 110 |
| 7 | (Spain) Sergio Hernández | 11 | DNS | 6 | 5 | 7 | 5 | 6 | 9 | 3 | 7 | 9 | 10 | Ret | 103 |
| 8 | (Spain) Pedro Barral | 4 | Ret | 10 | 7 | 6 | 10 | 5 | 15 | 7 | 3 | Ret | 12 | 11 | 94 |
| 9 | (Portugal) Lourenço da Veiga | 10 | 7 | 5 | 10 | 5 | 4 | Ret | 12 | 8 | DNS | Ret | 8 | 8 | 87 |
| 10 | (Spain) Juan Antonio del Pino | | | | | | | 7 | Ret | 5 | 2 | 7 | 3 | 6 | 74 |
| 11 | (Argentina) Ricardo Risatti | 5 | 3 | 7 | 11 | 18 | DNS | 8 | 8 | Ret | Ret | Ret | 16† | 7 | 70 |
| 12 | (Spain) Álvaro Barba | NC | DNS | 14 | 16 | 9 | 7 | 10 | Ret | DSQ | Ret | 6 | 2 | 4 | 68 |
| 13 | (Spain) María de Villota | Ret | 10 | 8 | 8 | 12 | Ret | Ret | 10 | 9 | DNS | 5 | 13 | 10 | 63 |
| 14 | (Spain) Roldán Rodríguez | 12 | 6 | Ret | 9 | 13 | Ret | 9 | 6 | 6 | 8 | Ret | DNS | Ret | 59 |
| 15 | (Spain) Emilio de Villota Jr. | 14 | 9 | 11 | 17† | 11 | 8 | 12 | 13 | DSQ | Ret | Ret | 15 | 12 | 42 |
| 16 | (Germany) Dennis Furchheim | 13 | Ret | 3 | 13 | 10 | DSQ | | | | | | | | 28 |
| 17 | (Spain) Alejandro Núñez | Ret | DNS | 13 | 12 | Ret | 13 | 11 | 11 | DNS | DNS | 8 | | | 28 |
| 18 | (Spain) Roc Mas | 15 | 11 | 15 | 14 | 16 | DNS | 13 | 14 | 11 | 9 | Ret | Ret | Ret | 26 |
| 19 | (United Kingdom) Marc McLoughlin | 7 | 8 | | | | | | | | | | | | 17 |
| 20 | (Spain) Ángel Romero | | | | | 17 | 9 | | | | | | | | 7 |
| 21 | (Spain) Francisco J. Reina | | | | | 15 | 11 | | | | | | | | 6 |
| 22 | (Finland) Henri Niskanen | | | 12 | Ret | | | | | | | | | | 4 |
| 23 | (Spain) Victor Ordóñez | Ret | Ret | | | | | | | | | | 14 | Ret | 2 |
| | (Spain) Ricardo Ferrando | Ret | DNS | Ret | DNS | | | | | | | | | | 0 |
Guest driver ineligible for points
| | (Belgium) Jan Heylen | | | | | | | | | | | | 7 | 3 | 0 |
| | (Spain) Adrián Vallés | | | | | | | | | | | | 9 | DNS | 0 |
| Pos | Driver | ALB (Spain) | | JAR (Spain) | | JER (Spain) | | EST (Portugal) | | VAL (Spain) | | JER (Spain) | CAT (Spain) | | Pts |

| Colour | Result |
|---|---|
| Gold | Winner |
| Silver | Second place |
| Bronze | Third place |
| Green | Points classification |
| Blue | Non-points classification |
| Blue | Non-classified finish (NC) |
| Purple | Retired, not classified (Ret) |
| Red | Did not qualify (DNQ) |
| Red | Did not pre-qualify (DNPQ) |
| Black | Disqualified (DSQ) |
| White | Did not start (DNS) |
| White | Withdrew (WD) |
| White | Race cancelled (C) |
| Blank | Did not practice (DNP) |
| Blank | Did not arrive (DNA) |
| Blank | Excluded (EX) |

**Bold** – Pole
Italics – Fastest Lap

† – Drivers did not finish the race, but were classified as they completed over 90% of the race distance.

=== Teams' standings ===
- Points were awarded as follows:

| Pos | 1 | 2 | 3 | 4 | 5 |
|---|---|---|---|---|---|
| Points | 10 | 8 | 6 | 4 | 3 |

| Pos | Team | Car No. | ALB (Spain) | | JAR (Spain) | | JER (Spain) | | EST (Portugal) | | VAL (Spain) | | JER (Spain) | CAT (Spain) | | Pts |
|---|---|---|---|---|---|---|---|---|---|---|---|---|---|---|---|---|
| 1 | Racing Engineering | 4 | 4 | Ret | 10 | 7 | 6 | 10 | 5 | 15 | 7 | 3 | Ret | 12 | 11 | 119 |
| 1 | Racing Engineering | 5 | 9 | 4 | Ret | 15 | 3 | 1 | 1 | 1 | 1 | 5 | 1 | 1 | 5 | 119 |
| 1 | Racing Engineering | 6 | 13 | Ret | 3 | 13 | 10 | DSQ | 7 | Ret | 5 | 2 | 7 | 7 | 3 | 119 |
| 1 | Racing Engineering | 7 | 10 | 7 | 5 | 10 | 5 | 4 | Ret | 12 | 8 | DNS | Ret | 8 | 8 | 119 |
| 2 | GTA Motor Competición | 14 | 1 | Ret | 9 | 2 | 8 | 2 | 3 | 5 | 2 | 1 | 4 | 6 | 2 | 93 |
| 2 | GTA Motor Competición | 15 | Ret | 10 | 8 | 8 | 12 | Ret | Ret | 10 | 9 | DNS | 5 | 13 | 10 | 93 |
| 2 | GTA Motor Competición | 16 | 8 | 5 | 2 | 6 | 14 | Ret | 4 | 3 | 4 | Ret | Ret | 11 | 9 | 93 |
| 3 | ECA Racing | 10 | | | | | | | | | 11 | 9 | Ret | Ret | Ret | 64 |
| 3 | ECA Racing | 11 | 2 | Ret | 1 | 3 | 1 | 6 | 2 | 2 | 12 | 6 | Ret | 4 | 1 | 64 |
| 3 | ECA Racing | 12 | Ret | DNS | Ret | DNS | | | 9 | 6 | 6 | 8 | Ret | DNS | Ret | 64 |
| 4 | Meycom Sport | 8 | 3 | 1 | Ret | 1 | 2 | 12 | NC | 4 | 13 | 4 | 3 | 9 | DNS | 60 |
| 4 | Meycom Sport | 9 | NC | DNS | 14 | 16 | 9 | 7 | 10 | Ret | DSQ | Ret | 6 | 2 | 4 | 60 |
| 5 | EV Racing | 1 | 14 | 9 | 11 | 17† | 11 | 8 | 12 | 13 | DSQ | Ret | Ret | 15 | 12 | 46 |
| 5 | EV Racing | 2 | 5 | 3 | 7 | 11 | 18 | DNS | 8 | 8 | Ret | Ret | 8 | 14 | Ret | 46 |
| 5 | EV Racing | 3 | 6 | 2 | 4 | 4 | 4 | 3 | Ret | 7 | 10 | Ret | 2 | 5 | 13 | 46 |
| 6 | Azteca Motorsport | 17 | 11 | DNS | 6 | 5 | 7 | 5 | 6 | 9 | 3 | 7 | 9 | 10 | Ret | 9 |
| 6 | Azteca Motorsport | 18 | 7 | 8 | 13 | 12 | Ret | 13 | 11 | 11 | DNS | DNS | | | | 9 |
| 7 | G-TEC Sport | 19 | Ret | Ret | 12 | Ret | 15 | 11 | | | | | | 3 | 6 | 6 |
| 7 | G-TEC Sport | 20 | | | | | 17 | 9 | | | | | | | | 6 |
| 8 | Elide Racing | 21 | Ret | DNS | | | | | | | | | | | | 0 |
| 8 | Elide Racing | 22 | 12 | 6 | Ret | 9 | 13 | Ret | | | | | | 16† | 7 | 0 |
| 9 | Skualo Competición | 23 | 15 | 11 | 15 | 14 | 16 | DNS | 13 | 14 | | | | | | 0 |
| Pos | Team | Car No. | ALB (Spain) | | JAR (Spain) | | JER (Spain) | | EST (Portugal) | | VAL (Spain) | | JER (Spain) | CAT (Spain) | | Pts |
