= Álvaro Barba =

Spanish racing driver

- Nationality: (Spain) Spanish
- Born: Álvaro Barba López; 17 February 1984 (age 42) Seville, Spain
- Relatives: Marco Barba (brother)

International GT Open career
- Debut season: 2008
- Current team: Advanced Engineering
- Categorisation: FIA Gold (until 2018); FIA Silver (2019–)
- Car number: TBC
- Former teams: MC Competicion

Previous series
- 2002 2003 2003–05 2006–08 2008–09: Spanish Formula Junior 1600; World Series Lights; Spanish F3 Championship; Formula Renault 3.5 Series; International GT Open

Álvaro Barba López (Note: In this Spanish name, the first or paternal surname is Barba and the second or maternal family name is López.) (born 17 February 1984 in Seville) is a Spanish former racing driver and brother to fellow racer Marco Barba.

== Career ==
=== Formula Junior and Spanish Formula Three ===
Barba began his single seater career in 2002 driving in the Spanish Formula Junior 1600 series, where he finished runner up to fellow countryman Adrián Vallés. In 2003, he moved up to the Spanish Formula Three Championship, the first of three seasons in the category. During his time in the series, he accumulated nine podium positions, including three race wins, with his best season coming in 2005 when he finished fifth in the championship. He also raced in that year's Marlboro Masters event at Zandvoort, finishing in 24th place.

=== Formula Renault 3.5 Series ===
In 2003, Barba raced a full season in the World Series Lights championship, which acted as a support event to the World Series by Nissan. Barba took two podium positions during the year to finish tenth overall.

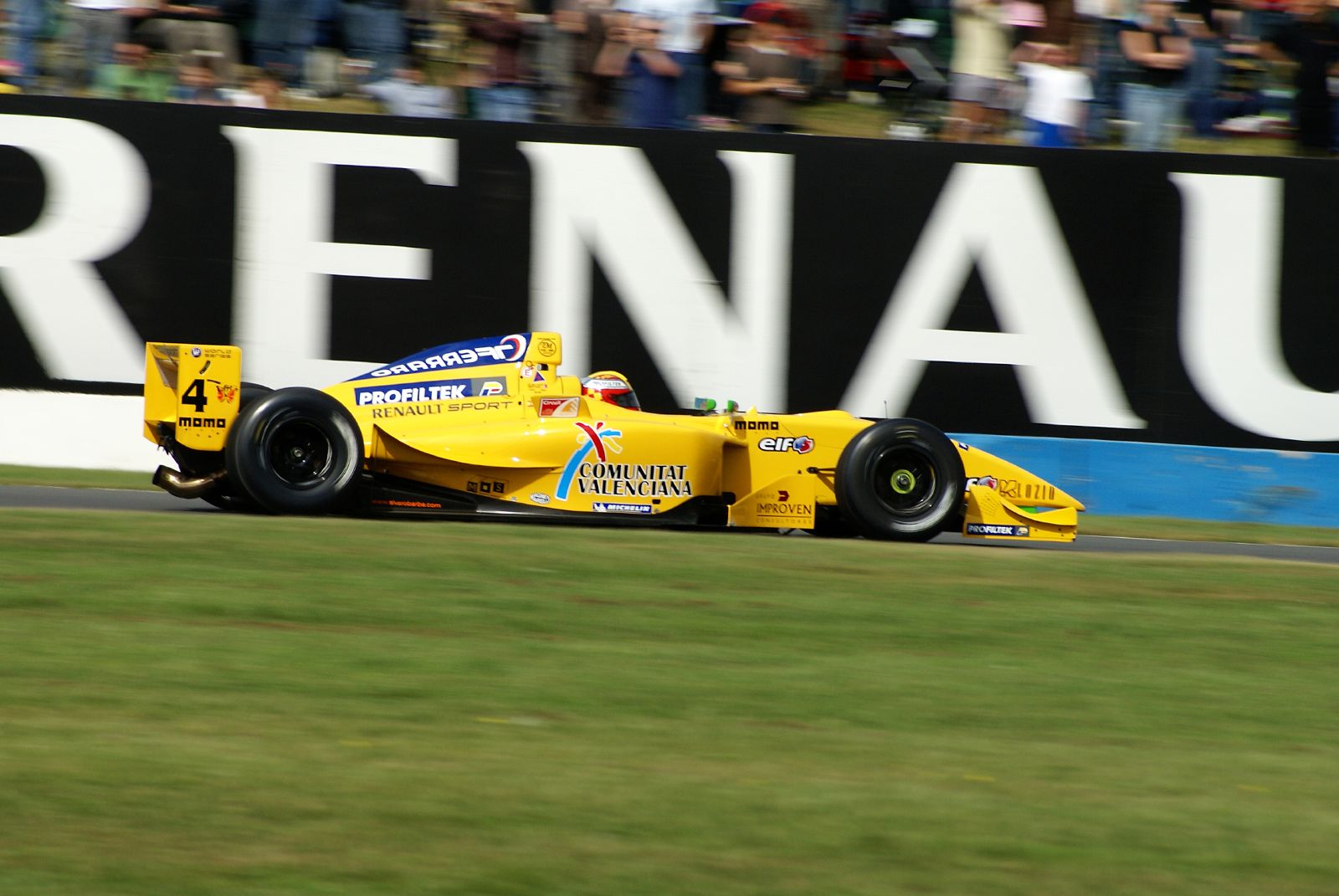
Barba driving for Draco Racing in the Donington Park round of the 2007 Formula Renault 3.5 Series season.

In 2006 he stepped up to the Formula Renault 3.5 Series with the Swiss team Jenzer Motorsport, taking nine points to finish his debut season 26th overall. He joined top Italian team International DracoRacing for the 2007 season, taking two podium positions, including his first race win at Donington Park. He finished the season eighth overall.

For 2008, Barba continued in the World Series, this time switching to the Italian squad Prema Powerteam, with his brother Marco taking over his seat at Draco Racing. After taking a podium in the opening event of the season, he took a further three podium places and a fastest lap to be classified tenth in the championship.

=== International GT Open ===
In July 2008, Barba teamed up with his brother to race a Mosler MT900R in the International GT Open event held at the brand new Valencia Street Circuit, and in December 2008, it was announced that Barba would race for the Advanced Engineering team in the 2009 season.

== Career results ==
=== Career summary ===
Season	Series	Team	Races	Wins	Podiums	Poles	F.Laps	Points	Position
2002	Spanish Formula Junior 1600	Escuela Lois	12	3	9	1	0	134	**2nd**
2003	Spanish Formula Three Championship	Meycom Sport	11	0	1	0	0	68	16th
2003	World Series Lights	Escuela Lois Circuit	15	0	2	0	2	63	10th
2004	Spanish Formula Three Championship	Adrian Campos Motorsport	14	0	2	0	0	31	8th
2004	Spanish Formula Three Championship - Winter Series	Adrian Campos Motorsport	2	0	1	0	0	N/A	**3rd**
2004	Italian Formula Three Championship	Team Ghinzani	2	0	1	0	0	12	15th
2005	Spanish Formula Three Championship	Campos Racing	15	3	6	2	2	81	5th
2005	Masters of Formula 3	Hitech Racing	1	0	0	0	0	0	24th
2006	Formula Renault 3.5 Series	Jenzer Motorsport	17	0	0	0	0	9	26th
2007	Formula Renault 3.5 Series	International Draco Racing	17	1	2	0	4	64	8th
2008	Formula Renault 3.5 Series	Prema Powerteam	17	0	4	0	1	58	10th
2008	International GT Open - GTA	MC Competicion	2	0	0	0	0	0	NC
2009	FIA GT Championship - GT2	AF Corse	8	1	3	1	1	34	4th
2010	International GT Open	AF Corse	16	4	9	4	2	90	**1st**
2010	Le Mans Series	AF Corse	1	0	0	1	0	9	21st
2010	Spanish GT Championship	?	?	?	?	?	?	1	44th
2011	International GT Open	Autorlando Sport	16	2	6	1	1	118	12th
2011	Eurocup Mégane Trophy	Equipe Verschuur	2	0	1	0	0	0	NC
2012	International GT Open	Villois Racing	15	4	7	3	0	76	**3rd**
2013	International GT Open - GTS	Ombra Racing	8	1	1	0	0	14	22nd
2014	International GT Open	Drivex School	2	0	0	0	0	7	12th
2014	International GT Open - GTS	Ombra Racing	4	1	2	0	1	18	14th
2014	Italian GT Championship	Ombra Racing	2	0	0	0	0	0	NC
2015	International GT Open	AERT	7	0	1	0	0	8	11th

=== Complete Formula Renault 3.5 Series results ===
(key) (Races in bold indicate pole position) (Races in italics indicate fastest lap)

Year	Team	1	2	3	4	5	6	7	8	9	10	11	12	13	14	15	16	17	Pos	Points
2006	Jenzer Motorsport	ZOL; 1 Ret	ZOL; 2; 7	MON; 1 Ret	IST; 1; 22	IST; 2 Ret	MIS; 1 Ret	MIS; 2; 13	SPA; 1; 6	SPA; 2; 12	NÜR; 1 Ret	NÜR; 2; 14	DON; 1; 22	DON; 2; 23	LMS; 1; 15	LMS; 2 Ret	CAT; 1 Ret	CAT; 2; 15	26th	9
2007	International DracoRacing	MNZ; 1 Ret	MNZ; 2 Ret	NÜR; 1; 4	NÜR; 2; 5	MON; 1; 19	HUN; 1 Ret	HUN; 2 Ret	SPA; 1 Ret	SPA; 2; 17	DON; 1; 1	DON; 2 Ret	MAG; 1; 12	MAG; 2; 11	EST; 1; 3	EST; 2; 6	CAT; 1; 18	CAT; 2 Ret	9th	64
2008	Prema Powerteam	MNZ; 1 Ret	MNZ; 2; 2	SPA; 1 DNS	SPA; 2; 10	MON; 1; 14	**SIL**; **1**; 3	SIL; 2; 8	HUN; 1 Ret	HUN; 2; 5	NÜR; 1 Ret	NÜR; 2; 3	BUG; 1 NC	BUG; 2; 12	EST; 1; 2	EST; 2 Ret	CAT; 1; 6	CAT; 2 Ret	10th	58

== Notes ==
Sporting positions
Preceded by Joël Camathias; Marcel Fässler	International GT Open champion 2010 with Pierre Kaffer	Succeeded by Soheil Ayari
