= 2005 Spanish Formula Three Championship =

Motor racing competition

Seasons
- ← 2004 2006 →

The 2005 Spanish Formula Three Championship was the fifth Spanish Formula Three season. It began on 17 April at Circuito del Jarama in Madrid and ended on 13 November at Circuit de Catalunya in Montmeló after fifteen races. Andy Soucek was crowned series champion.

== Teams and drivers ==
- All teams were Spanish-registered. All cars were powered by Toyota engines and Dunlop tyres. Main class powered by Dallara F305, while Copa Class by Dallara F300 chassis.

Team	No.	Driver	Rounds
Class A
Racing Engineering	1	(Spain) Javier Villa	All
Racing Engineering	2	(Argentina) Ricardo Risatti	All
Racing Engineering	3	(Portugal) Filipe Albuquerque	1–2, 4–5, 7–8
Racing Engineering	3	(Germany) Sebastian Vettel	3
Racing Engineering	3	(Switzerland) Sébastien Buemi	6
GTA Motor Competición	4	(Colombia) Sebastián Moreno	1
GTA Motor Competición	4	(Brazil) Carlos Iaconelli	4–6
GTA Motor Competición	4	(Andorra) Manel Cerqueda Jr.	7–8
GTA Motor Competición	5	(Spain) José Manuel Pérez-Aicart	All
Campos Racing	6	(Spain) Álvaro Barba	All
Campos Racing	7	(Spain) Roldán Rodríguez	All
IGI Tec-Auto	8	(Peru) Juan Manuel Polar	1–4
ECA Racing	10	(Spain) Daniel Martín	1–2
ECA Racing	10	(Peru) Juan Manuel Polar	7–8
Llusiá Racing	12	(Spain) Andy Soucek	All
Elide Racing	13	(Spain) Carlos Álvarez	4–8
Copa F300
IGI Tec-Auto	13	(Spain) Carlos Álvarez	1–2
IGI Tec-Auto	19	(Spain) Carlos Cosidó Jr.	5–8
Racing Engineering	14	(Spain) Marcos Martínez	All
GTA Motor Competición	15	(Andorra) Manel Cerqueda Jr.	1–6
GTA Motor Competición	15	(Spain) Iñigo Martínez	7–8
GTA Motor Competición	16	(Spain) Nil Montserrat	All
GTA Motor Competición	26	(Spain) Aitor Medina	2
Campos Racing	17	(Spain) Marco Barba	All
Campos Racing	18	(Spain) Arturo Llobell	All
Campos Racing	27	(Spain) Adrian Campos Jr.	6
ECA Racing	21	(Spain) Manuel Sáez-Merino Jr.	All
ECA Racing	22	(Spain) Roc Mas	1–3
ECA Racing	23	(Mexico) Piero Rodarte	2–8
Catolan Racing Sport	24	(Spain) Carlos Martín	1–5
Llusiá Racing	24	(Spain) Borja Mancera	7
Meycom Sport	25	(Spain) Maria de Villota	1
Meycom Sport	25	(Spain) Edeniel Soto	2–8
Escuela Española de Pilotos	28	(United Kingdom) Ryan Lewis	7

== Calendar ==
Round		Circuit	Date	Pole position	Fastest lap	Winning driver	Winning team	Copa Winner
1	R1	(Spain) Circuito del Jarama, Madrid	17 April	(Spain) Andy Soucek	(Spain) José Manuel Pérez-Aicart	(Spain) José Manuel Pérez-Aicart	GTA Motor Competición	(Spain) Arturo Llobell
1	R2	(Spain) Circuito del Jarama, Madrid	17 April	(Spain) José Manuel Pérez-Aicart	(Spain) José Manuel Pérez-Aicart	(Spain) Álvaro Barba	Campos Racing	(Spain) Manuel Sáez-Merino Jr.
2	R1	(Spain) Circuit Ricardo Tormo, Valencia	15 May	(Spain) Javier Villa	(Spain) Álvaro Barba	(Spain) Álvaro Barba	Campos Racing	(Spain) Arturo Llobell
2	R2	(Spain) Circuit Ricardo Tormo, Valencia	15 May	(Spain) Álvaro Barba	(Spain) Javier Villa	(Spain) Javier Villa	Racing Engineering	(Spain) Manuel Sáez-Merino Jr.
3		(Spain) Circuito de Albacete, Albacete	5 June	(Spain) Javier Villa	(Spain) Javier Villa	(Spain) Javier Villa	Racing Engineering	(Spain) Manuel Sáez-Merino Jr.
4	R1	(Portugal) Autódromo do Estoril, Estoril	26 June	(Spain) Andy Soucek	(Argentina) Ricardo Risatti	(Spain) Andy Soucek	Llusiá Racing	(Spain) Manuel Sáez-Merino Jr.
4	R2	(Portugal) Autódromo do Estoril, Estoril	26 June	(Argentina) Ricardo Risatti	(Argentina) Ricardo Risatti	(Argentina) Ricardo Risatti	Racing Engineering	(Spain) Marco Barba
5	R1	(Spain) Circuito de Albacete, Albacete	18 September	(Portugal) Filipe Albuquerque	(Spain) Javier Villa	(Argentina) Ricardo Risatti	Racing Engineering	(Spain) Marcos Martínez
5	R2	(Spain) Circuito de Albacete, Albacete	18 September	(Portugal) Filipe Albuquerque	(Argentina) Ricardo Risatti	(Argentina) Ricardo Risatti	Racing Engineering	(Spain) Marcos Martínez
6	R1	(Spain) Circuit Ricardo Tormo, Valencia	2 October	(Spain) Javier Villa	(Spain) José Manuel Pérez-Aicart	(Spain) Javier Villa	Racing Engineering	(Spain) Marcos Martínez
6	R2	(Spain) Circuit Ricardo Tormo, Valencia	2 October	(Spain) Javier Villa	(Spain) Álvaro Barba	(Spain) Álvaro Barba	Campos Racing	(Mexico) Piero Rodarte
7	R1	(Spain) Circuito de Jerez, Jerez de la Frontera	16 October	(Argentina) Ricardo Risatti	(Spain) Javier Villa	(Spain) Andy Soucek	Llusiá Racing	(Spain) Marcos Martínez
7	R2	(Spain) Circuito de Jerez, Jerez de la Frontera	16 October	(Argentina) Ricardo Risatti	(Spain) Javier Villa	(Argentina) Ricardo Risatti	Racing Engineering	(Spain) Marco Barba
8	R1	(Spain) Circuit de Catalunya, Barcelona	13 November	(Argentina) Ricardo Risatti	(Argentina) Ricardo Risatti	(Portugal) Filipe Albuquerque	Racing Engineering	(Mexico) Piero Rodarte
8	R2	(Spain) Circuit de Catalunya, Barcelona	13 November	(Argentina) Ricardo Risatti	(Spain) Andy Soucek	(Spain) Andy Soucek	Llusiá Racing	(Spain) Marcos Martínez

== Standings ==
=== Drivers' standings ===
- Points were awarded as follows:

1	2	3	4	5	6	7	8	9	FL
12	10	8	6	5	4	3	2	1	1

Pos	Driver	JAR (Spain)		VAL (Spain)		ALB (Spain)	EST (Portugal)		ALB (Spain)		VAL (Spain)		JER (Spain)		CAT (Spain)		Pts
1	(Spain) Andy Soucek	**2**	8	5	Ret	4	**1**	4	2	2	4	6	1	2	4	1	112
2	(Spain) José Manuel Pérez-Aicart	1	9	3	3	2	Ret	2	6	5	2	2	2	3	2	Ret	109
3	(Argentina) Ricardo Risatti	6	4	7	4	6	10	**1**	1	1	16†	3	**3**	**1**	**5**	**NC**	96
4	(Spain) Javier Villa	5	7	**2**	1	**1**	2	3	16	Ret	**1**	4	5	15	3	Ret	96
5	(Spain) Álvaro Barba	3	1	1	**2**	Ret	Ret	6	4	3	Ret	**1**	7	Ret	6	Ret	81
6	(Portugal) Filipe Albuquerque	9	5	17†	13		3	5	**3**	**4**			4	9	1	Ret	41
7	(Spain) Roldán Rodríguez	Ret	2	4	6	8	Ret	17	Ret	10	3	5	Ret	4	8	Ret	35
8	(Spain) Daniel Martín	4	3	6	5	5	4	Ret	8	6							31
9	(Spain) Marcos Martínez	Ret	11	NC	8	Ret	12	12	5	7	5	14†	6	8	10	2	29
10	(Spain) Marco Barba	10	Ret	Ret	Ret	9	9	7	9	8	6	8	Ret	5	9	7	27
11	(Spain) Arturo Llobell	7	13	9	9	11	7	13	12	Ret	8	10	8	7	11	4	16
12	(Spain) Manuel Sáez-Merino Jr.	8	6	11	7	7	5	11	13	13	13	9	Ret	Ret	12	8	13
13	(Peru) Juan Manuel Polar	14	10	8	Ret	10	6	9					10	16†	15	3	12
14	(Mexico) Piero Rodarte			12	15	12	8	10	11	9	7	7	Ret	12	7	Ret	10
15	(Germany) Sebastian Vettel					3											8
16	(Spain) Edeniel Soto			16	17	15	13	15	15	Ret	12	DNS	14	Ret	13	5	4
17	(Spain) Carlos Álvarez	13	15	18†	11		Ret	Ret	10	Ret	Ret	Ret	Ret	6	Ret	Ret	4
18	(Spain) Carlos Cosidó Jr.								Ret	14	11	12	11	13	14	6	4
19	(Andorra) Manel Cerqueda Jr.	16	16	14	12	NC	Ret	18†	7	11	10	Ret					3
20	(Brazil) Carlos Iaconelli						Ret	8	Ret	15	15†	15†					2
21	(Spain) Nil Montserrat	12	17	10	Ret	14	11	14	14	12	9	11	9	11	16†	Ret	2
	(Spain) Carlos Martín	11	18†	13	10	13	NC	16									0
	(Spain) Roc Mas	Ret	Ret	DNS	16†	Ret											0
	(Spain) Adrian Campos Jr.										14	DNS					0
	(Spain) Borja Mancera										Ret	13					0
	(Spain) Aitor Medina			15	14												0
	(Spain) Iñigo Martínez												15	14	Ret	Ret	0
	(Spain) María de Villota	NC	12														0
	(United Kingdom) Ryan Lewis												13	Ret			0
	(Colombia) Sebastián Moreno	15	14														0
	(Switzerland) Sébastien Buemi										Ret	DNS					0
Pos	Driver	JAR (Spain)		VAL (Spain)		ALB (Spain)	EST (Portugal)		ALB (Spain)		VAL (Spain)		JER (Spain)		CAT (Spain)		Pts

Colour	Result
Gold	Winner
Silver	Second place
Bronze	Third place
Green	Points classification
Blue	Non-points classification
Blue	Non-classified finish (NC)
Purple	Retired, not classified (Ret)
Red	Did not qualify (DNQ)
Red	Did not pre-qualify (DNPQ)
Black	Disqualified (DSQ)
White	Did not start (DNS)
White	Withdrew (WD)
White	Race cancelled (C)
Blank	Did not practice (DNP)
Blank	Did not arrive (DNA)
Blank	Excluded (EX)

**Bold** – Pole
Italics – Fastest Lap

† — Drivers did not finish the race, but were classified as they completed over 90% of the race distance.

=== Copa de España de F3 ===
Pos	Driver	Pts
1	(Spain) Arturo Llobell	86
2	(Spain) Marcos Martínez Ucha	82
3	(Spain) Marco Barba	79
4	(Spain) Manuel Sáez-Merino, jr.	69
5	(Mexico) Piero Rodarte	61
6	(Spain) Nil Montserrat	33
7	(Spain) Carlos Martín	14
8	(Andorra) Manel Cerqueda, jr.	12
9	(Spain) Carlos Cosidó Jr.	8
10	(Spain) Edeniel Soto	6
11	(Spain) María de Villota	6
12	(Spain) Carlos Álvarez	6
13	(United Kingdom) Ryan Lewis	3

=== Teams' standings ===
Pos	Team	Pts
1	Racing Engineering	252
2	Campos Racing	124
3	GTA Motor Competición	119
4	Llusiá Racing	112
5	ECA Racing	40
6	IGI-Tec Auto	11
7	Catolan Racing Sport	0
8	Meycom Sport	0
9	Escuela Española de Pilotos	0

=== Trofeo Ibérico de Fórmula 3 ===
Pos	Driver	Pts
1	(Spain) Andy Soucek	77
2	(Spain) José Manuel Pérez-Aicart	58
3	(Spain) Javier Villa	45
4	(Spain) Álvaro Barba	35
5	(Spain) Arturo Llobell	27
6	(Spain) Marcos Martínez	25
7	(Spain) Roldán Rodríguez	23
8	(Spain) Daniel Martín	20
9	(Spain) Manuel Sáez-Merino Jr.	20
10	(Spain) Marco Barba	16
