= Lourenço da Veiga =

Portuguese auto racing driver (born 1979)

Lourenço Beirão da Veiga
- Nationality: Portuguese
- Born: 7 September 1979 (age 47) (Portugal)

Spanish GT Championship career
- Debut season: 2009
- Current team: ASM Team
- Car number: 3

Previous series
- 2001-2002 2002 2003: Formula Renault 2.0 Italia; Eurocup Formula Renault 2.0; Spanish F3 Championship; Supercopa SEAT Leon; SEAT León Eurocup

Championship titles
- 2009: Spanish GT Champion

Lourenço Beirão da Veiga (born 7 September 1979) is a Portuguese former auto racing driver.

== Career ==
Da Viega competed in the 2002 Formula Renault 2000 Eurocup season. In 2008, he competed in the SEAT León Eurocup. A win in race six at his home circuit in Estoril, saw him rewarded with entry into one round of the World Touring Car Championship with the SUNRED Engineering team at Brands Hatch.

Da Viega's first major title came in 2009, winning the Spanish GT Championship along with fellow Portuguese driver Ricardo Bravo.

== Racing record ==
Season	Series	Team	Car No.	Races	Wins	Poles	Points	Final Placing
2001	Formula Renault 2000 Italia	Bicar Racing		3	0	0	0	N/A
2002	Formula Renault 2000 Eurocup	Cram Competition		9	0	0	2	27th
2003	Spanish Formula Three Championship	Racing Engineering		12	0	0	89	9th
2004	British GT Championship	Damax						
2005	Supercopa SEAT Leon Spain	Baporo Motorsport						6th
2006	Supercopa SEAT Leon Spain	Baporo Motorsport		17	0	0	70	9th
2007	Supercopa SEAT Leon Spain	Bastos Sport		16	2	1	88	3rd
2008	Supercopa SEAT Leon Spain	Bastos Sport		14	0	0	62	9th
2008	SEAT Leon Eurocup	Bastos Sport		6	1	0	21	10th
2008	WTCC	SUNRED Engineering		2	0	0	0	N/A
2009	Spanish GT Championship	ASM Team	3	12	6			1st

=== Complete WTCC results ===
(key) (Races in bold indicate pole position) (Races in italics indicate fastest lap)

Year	Team	Car	1	2	3	4	5	6	7		8	9	10	11	12	Position	Points
2008	SUNRED Engineering	SEAT León TFSI	CUR	PUE	VAL	PAU	BRN	EST	BRA		OSC	IMO	MNZ	OKA	MAC	NC	0
2008	SUNRED Engineering	SEAT León TFSI							20	19						NC	0
