= 2014 International GT Open =

The 2014 International GT Open season was the ninth season of the International GT Open, the grand tourer-style sports car racing founded in 2006 by the Spanish GT Sport Organización. It began on 3 May at the Nürburgring and finished on 2 November, at Circuit de Barcelona-Catalunya after eight double-header meetings, and a total of sixteen races.

The overall GT Open title – determined by race results within two specific classes as well as overall results – was claimed by SMP Racing Russian Bears duo Roman Mavlanov and Daniel Zampieri, taking three class and overall race wins over the course of the season. Mavlanov and Zampieri won the championship by 10 points ahead of V8 Racing's Nicky Pastorelli and Miguel Ramos. Pastorelli and Ramos won five races overall, and took two further victories in the Super GT class, taking the most wins over the course of the season. A point further behind in third place was 2013 champion Andrea Montermini, with team-mate Niccolò Schirò, at Scuderia Villorba Corse. Although Montermini and Schirò outscored Pastorelli and Ramos on gross scores, a dropped score per the series' sporting regulations cost the Villorba Corse duo the runner-up position. Montermini and Schirò took two race victories, at Jerez and Barcelona. Other overall wins were taken by Maxime Soulet, who won races at the Nürburgring with Nick Catsburg and Portimão with Isaac Tutumlu, while Tutumlu also shared a victory with Archie Hamilton at Spa-Francorchamps. The only overall win for a GTS car came in the final race of the season, as Viacheslav Maleev and José Manuel Pérez-Aicart – team-mates to Mavlanov and Zampieri – headed the field.

In the respective class championships, Mavlanov and Zampieri won the Super GT drivers' championship by five points over Pastorelli and Ramos. Again, just like the overall championship, Montermini and Schirò outscored Pastorelli and Ramos on gross scores, but a dropped score per the series' sporting regulations cost the Villorba Corse duo the runner-up position. In GTS, AF Corse driver Giorgio Roda was crowned champion, having shared his car with Andrea Piccini, Paolo Ruberti and Marco Cioci over the course of the year. Roda won races at the Nürburgring and Monza, to win the title by nine points ahead of Pérez-Aicart, who won five races in class. Maleev finished third in class, after he missed the Silverstone round, where he was replaced by Joan Vinyes. In the teams' championships, V8 Racing won in Super GT by 51 points ahead of SMP Racing Russian Bears, while AF Corse comfortably won in GTS, finishing 123 points clear of their nearest rivals.

== Entry list ==
2014 Entry List
Team	No.	Drivers	Car	Rounds
Super GT
(Italy) Scuderia Villorba Corse	1	(Italy) Andrea Montermini	Ferrari 458 GT Italia (2013)	All
(Italy) Scuderia Villorba Corse	1	(Italy) Niccolò Schirò	Ferrari 458 GT Italia (2013)	All
(Netherlands) V8 Racing	2	(Netherlands) Nicky Pastorelli	Chevrolet Corvette C6.R	1–5
(Netherlands) V8 Racing	2	(Portugal) Miguel Ramos	Chevrolet Corvette C6.R	1–5
(Netherlands) V8 Racing	2	(Netherlands) Nicky Pastorelli	Chevrolet Corvette C6 ZR1	6–8
(Netherlands) V8 Racing	2	(Portugal) Miguel Ramos	Chevrolet Corvette C6 ZR1	6–8
(Netherlands) V8 Racing	4	(Netherlands) Diederik Sijthoff	Chevrolet Corvette C6.R	1–4, 6, 8
(Netherlands) V8 Racing	4	(United Kingdom) Archie Hamilton	Chevrolet Corvette C6.R	1–4
(Netherlands) V8 Racing	4	(Belgium) Maxime Soulet	Chevrolet Corvette C6.R	5–8
(Netherlands) V8 Racing	4	(Italy) Francesco Pastorelli	Chevrolet Corvette C6.R	5
(Netherlands) V8 Racing	4	(Netherlands) Kelvin Snoeks	Chevrolet Corvette C6.R	7
(Spain) Drivex School	5	(Spain) Fernando Monje	Porsche 997 GT3 RSR (2012)	1
(Spain) Drivex School	5	(Argentina) Juan Manuel López	Porsche 997 GT3 RSR (2012)	1
(Spain) Drivex School	5	(Denmark) Thomas Fjordbach	Porsche 997 GT3 RSR (2012)	3
(Spain) Drivex School	5	(Spain) Álvaro Barba	Porsche 997 GT3 RSR (2012)	3
(Spain) Drivex School	7	(Spain) Miguel Angel de Castro	Porsche 911 GT3 RSR	3
(Belgium) / Selleslagh Racing Team SRT; (Belgium) / Selleslagh Racing Team by Barzani	6	(Belgium) Maxime Soulet	Chevrolet Corvette C6 ZR1	1–4
(Belgium) / Selleslagh Racing Team SRT; (Belgium) / Selleslagh Racing Team by Barzani	6	(United Kingdom) Archie Hamilton	Chevrolet Corvette C6 ZR1	5–8
(Belgium) / Selleslagh Racing Team SRT; (Belgium) / Selleslagh Racing Team by Barzani	6	(Netherlands) Nick Catsburg	Chevrolet Corvette C6 ZR1	1
(Belgium) / Selleslagh Racing Team SRT; (Belgium) / Selleslagh Racing Team by Barzani	6	(Spain) Isaac Tutumlu	Chevrolet Corvette C6 ZR1	2–8
(United Kingdom) TF Sport	8	(United Kingdom) Darren Turner	Aston Martin V12 Vantage GT3	5
(United Kingdom) TF Sport	8	(United Kingdom) Jody Fannin	Aston Martin V12 Vantage GT3	5
(Italy) Autorlando Sport	13	(Italy) Matteo Beretta	Porsche 997 GT3R	1
(Italy) Autorlando Sport	13	(Spain) Isaac Tutumlu	Porsche 997 GT3R	1
(Russia) SMP Racing Russian Bears	60	(Russia) Roman Mavlanov	Ferrari 458 GT Italia	All
(Russia) SMP Racing Russian Bears	60	(Italy) Daniel Zampieri	Ferrari 458 GT Italia	All
(Switzerland) Black Bull Swiss Racing	64	(Switzerland) Joël Camathias	Ferrari 458 GT Italia	1
(Switzerland) Black Bull Swiss Racing	64	(Italy) Mirko Venturi	Ferrari 458 GT Italia	1
(Italy) Eurotech Engineering	68	(Italy) Davide Valsecchi	Lamborghini Gallardo GT3	1
(Italy) Eurotech Engineering	68	(Italy) Giovanni Venturini	Lamborghini Gallardo GT3	1
GTS
(Italy) Autorlando Sport	13	(Italy) Matteo Beretta	Porsche 997 GT3R	2–8
(Italy) Autorlando Sport	13	(Switzerland) Joël Camathias	Porsche 997 GT3R	2–8
(Italy) Autorlando Sport	83	(Austria) Thomas Gruber	Porsche 997 GT3R	7
(Italy) Autorlando Sport	83	(Italy) Emanuele Romani	Porsche 997 GT3R	7
(Portugal) Veloso Motorsport	33	(Portugal) Tiago Mesquita	Lamborghini Gallardo FL2	8
(Portugal) Veloso Motorsport	33	(Portugal) Patrick Cunha	Lamborghini Gallardo FL2	8
(Switzerland) Kessel Racing	52	(United States) Stephen Earle	Ferrari 458 GT Italia (2013)	8
(Switzerland) Kessel Racing	52	(Denmark) Johnny Laursen	Ferrari 458 GT Italia (2013)	8
(Italy) AF Corse	53	(Switzerland) Thomas Flohr	Ferrari 458 GT Italia (2013)	2, 4
(Italy) AF Corse	53	(Italy) Francesco Castellacci	Ferrari 458 GT Italia (2013)	2, 4
(Italy) AF Corse	54	(United Kingdom) Duncan Cameron	Ferrari 458 GT Italia (2013)	1–4, 6–8
(Italy) AF Corse	54	(Republic of Ireland) Matt Griffin	Ferrari 458 GT Italia (2013)	1–4, 6–8
(Italy) AF Corse	55	(Germany) Claudio Sdanewitsch	Ferrari 458 GT Italia (2013)	All
(Italy) AF Corse	55	(Italy) Federico Leo	Ferrari 458 GT Italia (2013)	1, 5, 7–8
(Italy) AF Corse	55	(Italy) Michele Rugolo	Ferrari 458 GT Italia (2013)	2–4, 6
(Italy) AF Corse	56	(Italy) Giorgio Roda	Ferrari 458 GT Italia (2013)	All
(Italy) AF Corse	56	(Italy) Andrea Piccini	Ferrari 458 GT Italia (2013)	1
(Italy) AF Corse	56	(Italy) Paolo Ruberti	Ferrari 458 GT Italia (2013)	2–7
(Italy) AF Corse	56	(Italy) Marco Cioci	Ferrari 458 GT Italia (2013)	8
(Italy) AF Corse	57	(Belgium) Adrien De Leener	Ferrari 458 GT Italia (2013)	2
(Italy) AF Corse	57	(Monaco) Cédric Sbirrazzuoli	Ferrari 458 GT Italia (2013)	2
(Italy) AF Corse	79	(Russia) Nikita Zlobin	Ferrari 458 GT Italia (2013)	6–8
(Italy) AF Corse	79	(Italy) Luca Persiani	Ferrari 458 GT Italia (2013)	6–8
(Italy) AF Corse	80	(Thailand) Pasin Lathouras	Ferrari 458 GT Italia (2013)	6–7
(Italy) AF Corse	80	(United Kingdom) Richard Lyons	Ferrari 458 GT Italia (2013)	6–7
(Portugal) Team Novadriver	58	(Portugal) César Campaniço	Audi R8 LMS ultra	All
(Portugal) Team Novadriver	58	(India) Aditya Patel	Audi R8 LMS ultra	All
(Portugal) Team Novadriver	88	(Spain) Fernando Monje	Audi R8 LMS ultra	8
(Portugal) Team Novadriver	88	(Germany) Fabien Hamprecht	Audi R8 LMS ultra	8
(Portugal) Sports and You	59	(Portugal) António Coimbra	Mercedes-Benz SLS AMG GT3	1–2
(Portugal) Sports and You	59	(Portugal) Luis Silva	Mercedes-Benz SLS AMG GT3	1–2
(Russia) SMP Racing Russian Bears	61	(Spain) José Manuel Pérez-Aicart	Ferrari 458 GT Italia	All
(Russia) SMP Racing Russian Bears	61	(Russia) Viacheslav Maleev	Ferrari 458 GT Italia	1–4, 6–8
(Russia) SMP Racing Russian Bears	61	(Spain) Joan Vynes	Ferrari 458 GT Italia	5
(Italy) Ombra Racing	62	(Italy) Mario Cordoni	Ferrari 458 GT Italia	1–3, 5, 7
(Italy) Ombra Racing	62	(Italy) Stefano Gattuso	Ferrari 458 GT Italia	1–3, 5, 7
(Italy) Ombra Racing	63	(Italy) Stefano Gattuso	Ferrari 458 GT Italia	6
(Italy) Ombra Racing	63	(Italy) Stefano Costantini	Ferrari 458 GT Italia	1–3, 6–7
(Italy) Ombra Racing	63	(Spain) Álvaro Barba	Ferrari 458 GT Italia	4–5
(Italy) Ombra Racing	63	(Spain) Alan Sicart	Ferrari 458 GT Italia	1–5
(Italy) Ombra Racing	63	(Italy) Lorenzo Bontempelli	Ferrari 458 GT Italia	7
(Italy) Eurotech Engineering	67	(Italy) Ferdinando Geri	Lamborghini Gallardo GT3	1
(Italy) Eurotech Engineering	67	(Italy) Lorenzo Bontempelli	Lamborghini Gallardo GT3	1
(Germany) / Team Spirit Race; (Germany) / Attempto Racing	69	(Germany) Dietmar Haggenmüller	Audi R8 LMS ultra	1, 6
(Germany) / Team Spirit Race; (Germany) / Attempto Racing	69	(Germany) Arkin Aka	Audi R8 LMS ultra	6
(Germany) / Team Spirit Race; (Germany) / Attempto Racing	69	(Germany) Suzanne Weidt	Audi R8 LMS ultra	1
(Germany) / Team Spirit Race; (Germany) / Attempto Racing	78	(Germany) Suzanne Weidt	Audi R8 LMS ultra	6
(Germany) / Team Spirit Race; (Germany) / Attempto Racing	78	(Denmark) Michelle Gatting	Audi R8 LMS ultra	6
(Austria) Lechner Racing	70	(Austria) Mario Plachutta	Mercedes-Benz SLS AMG GT3	1–2, 4
(Austria) Lechner Racing	70	(Germany) Thomas Jäger	Mercedes-Benz SLS AMG GT3	1–2, 4
(Italy) Krypton Motorsport	71	(Italy) Glauco Solieri	Porsche 997 GT3R	1
(Italy) Krypton Motorsport	71	(Italy) Stefano Pezzucchi	Porsche 997 GT3R	1
(Netherlands) Kox Racing	72	(Czech Republic) Tomáš Enge	Lamborghini Gallardo FL2	1
(Netherlands) Kox Racing	72	(Germany) Maximiliam Völker	Lamborghini Gallardo FL2	1
(Netherlands) Kox Racing	76	(Germany) Maximiliam Völker	Lamborghini Gallardo FL2	8
(Netherlands) Kox Racing	76	(Netherlands) Peter Kox	Lamborghini Gallardo FL2	1, 8
(Netherlands) Kox Racing	76	(Netherlands) Nico Pronk	Lamborghini Gallardo FL2	1
(Italy) Ebimotors	73	(Switzerland) Ivan Jacoma	Porsche 997 GT3R (2013)	2, 5, 7
(Italy) Ebimotors	73	(Switzerland) Adriano Pan	Porsche 997 GT3R (2013)	2, 5, 7
(Italy) Nova Race	74	(United Kingdom) Craig Dolby	Nissan GT-R Nismo GT3	3
(Italy) Nova Race	74	(Italy) Lorenzo Bontempelli	Nissan GT-R Nismo GT3	3
(Italy) Easy Race	75	(Italy) Fabio Mancini	Ferrari 458 GT Italia	4, 6–7
(Italy) Easy Race	75	(Italy) Andrea Dromedari	Ferrari 458 GT Italia	4, 6–7
Monaco Driving Experience	81	(Monaco) Francesco Castellacci	McLaren MP4-12C GT3	7
Monaco Driving Experience	81	(Monaco) Grant Tromans	McLaren MP4-12C GT3	7
(Germany) Reiter Engineering	82	(Germany) Maximiliam Völker	Chevrolet Camaro GT3	7
(Germany) Reiter Engineering	82	(Czech Republic) Tomáš Enge	Chevrolet Camaro GT3	7
(United Kingdom) Shaun Balfe	84	(United Kingdom) Shaun Balfe	Ferrari 458 GT Italia (2013)	8
(United Kingdom) Shaun Balfe	84	(United Kingdom) Phil Keen	Ferrari 458 GT Italia (2013)	8
(France) Team Sofrev ASP	85	(France) Maurice Ricci	Ferrari 458 GT Italia	8
(France) Team Sofrev ASP	85	(France) Jérôme Policand	Ferrari 458 GT Italia	8
(France) Team Sofrev ASP	86	(France) Jean-Luc Beaubelique	Ferrari 458 GT Italia	8
(France) Team Sofrev ASP	86	(France) Gabriel Balthazard	Ferrari 458 GT Italia	8
(France) TDS Racing	87	(France) Eric Dermont	BMW Z4 GT3	8
(France) TDS Racing	87	(France) Franck Perera	BMW Z4 GT3	8
(Netherlands) V8 Racing	99	(Netherlands) Dennis Retera	Chevrolet Corvette Z06.R GT3	1–5
(Netherlands) V8 Racing	99	(Belgium) Dylan Derdaele	Chevrolet Corvette Z06.R GT3	1–3
(Netherlands) V8 Racing	99	(Germany) Daniel Keilwitz	Chevrolet Corvette Z06.R GT3	4–5

== Race calendar and results ==
- An eight-round provisional calendar was revealed on 6 November 2013. On 23 January 2014 it was announced that the rounds at Jerez and Portimão would switch dates.

Round		Circuit	Date	Pole position	SGT Winner	GTS Winner
1	R1	(Germany) Nürburgring	3 May	(Russia) No. 60 SMP Racing Russian Bears	(Netherlands) No. 2 V8 Racing	(Russia) No. 61 SMP Racing Russian Bears
1	R1	(Germany) Nürburgring	3 May	(Russia) Roman Mavlanov (Italy) Daniel Zampieri	(Netherlands) Nicky Pastorelli (Portugal) Miguel Ramos	(Russia) Viacheslav Maleev (Spain) José Manuel Pérez-Aicart
1	R2	(Germany) Nürburgring	4 May	(Belgium) No. 6 Selleslagh Racing Team SRT	(Belgium) No. 6 Selleslagh Racing Team SRT	(Italy) No. 56 AF Corse
1	R2	(Germany) Nürburgring	4 May	(Belgium) Maxime Soulet (Netherlands) Nick Catsburg	(Belgium) Maxime Soulet (Netherlands) Nick Catsburg	(Italy) Giorgio Roda (Italy) Andrea Piccini
2	R1	(Portugal) Autódromo Internacional do Algarve, Portimão	7 June	(Belgium) No. 6 Selleslagh Racing Team by Barzani	(Belgium) No. 6 Selleslagh Racing Team by Barzani	(Italy) No. 63 Ombra Racing
2	R1	(Portugal) Autódromo Internacional do Algarve, Portimão	7 June	(Belgium) Maxime Soulet (Spain) Isaac Tutumlu	(Belgium) Maxime Soulet (Spain) Isaac Tutumlu	(Italy) Stefano Costantini (Spain) Alan Sicart
2	R2	(Portugal) Autódromo Internacional do Algarve, Portimão	8 June	(Belgium) No. 6 Selleslagh Racing Team by Barzani	(Netherlands) No. 2 V8 Racing	(Italy) No. 55 AF Corse
2	R2	(Portugal) Autódromo Internacional do Algarve, Portimão	8 June	(Belgium) Maxime Soulet (Spain) Isaac Tutumlu	(Netherlands) Nicky Pastorelli (Portugal) Miguel Ramos	(Germany) Claudio Sdanewitsch (Italy) Michele Rugolo
3	R1	(Spain) Circuito de Jerez	21 June	(Portugal) No. 58 Team Novadriver	(Russia) No. 60 SMP Racing Russian Bears	(Portugal) No. 58 Team Novadriver
3	R1	(Spain) Circuito de Jerez	21 June	(Portugal) César Campaniço (India) Aditya Patel	(Russia) Roman Mavlanov (Italy) Daniel Zampieri	(Portugal) César Campaniço (India) Aditya Patel
3	R2	(Spain) Circuito de Jerez	22 June	(Italy) No. 55 AF Corse	(Italy) No. 1 Scuderia Villorba Corse	(Italy) No. 74 Nova Race
3	R2	(Spain) Circuito de Jerez	22 June	(Germany) Claudio Sdanewitsch (Italy) Michele Rugolo	(Italy) Andrea Montermini (Italy) Niccolò Schirò	(United Kingdom) Craig Dolby (Italy) Lorenzo Bontempelli
4	R1	(Hungary) Hungaroring	5 July	(Russia) No. 60 SMP Racing Russian Bears	(Netherlands) No. 2 V8 Racing	(Italy) No. 63 Ombra Racing
4	R1	(Hungary) Hungaroring	5 July	(Russia) Roman Mavlanov (Italy) Daniel Zampieri	(Netherlands) Nicky Pastorelli (Portugal) Miguel Ramos	(Spain) Alan Sicart (Spain) Álvaro Barba
4	R2	(Hungary) Hungaroring	6 July	(Netherlands) No. 2 V8 Racing	(Netherlands) No. 2 V8 Racing	(Russia) No. 61 SMP Racing Russian Bears
4	R2	(Hungary) Hungaroring	6 July	(Netherlands) Nicky Pastorelli (Portugal) Miguel Ramos	(Netherlands) Nicky Pastorelli (Portugal) Miguel Ramos	(Russia) Viacheslav Maleev (Spain) José Manuel Pérez-Aicart
5	R1	(United Kingdom) Silverstone Circuit	19 July	(United Kingdom) No. 8 TF Sport	(United Kingdom) No. 8 TF Sport	(Italy) No. 13 Autorlando Sport
5	R1	(United Kingdom) Silverstone Circuit	19 July	(United Kingdom) Darren Turner (United Kingdom) Jody Fannin	(United Kingdom) Darren Turner (United Kingdom) Jody Fannin	(Italy) Matteo Beretta (Switzerland) Joël Camathias
5	R2	(United Kingdom) Silverstone Circuit	20 July	(Portugal) No. 58 Team Novadriver	(Russia) No. 60 SMP Racing Russian Bears	(Russia) No. 61 SMP Racing Russian Bears
5	R2	(United Kingdom) Silverstone Circuit	20 July	(Portugal) César Campaniço (India) Aditya Patel	(Russia) Roman Mavlanov (Italy) Daniel Zampieri	(Spain) Joan Vynes (Spain) José Manuel Pérez-Aicart
6	R1	(Belgium) Circuit de Spa-Francorchamps	6 September	(Belgium) No. 6 Selleslagh Racing Team by Barzani	(Netherlands) No. 2 V8 Racing	(Italy) No. 80 AF Corse
6	R1	(Belgium) Circuit de Spa-Francorchamps	6 September	(United Kingdom) Archie Hamilton (Spain) Isaac Tutumlu	(Netherlands) Nicky Pastorelli (Portugal) Miguel Ramos	(Thailand) Pasin Lathouras (United Kingdom) Richard Lyons
6	R2	(Belgium) Circuit de Spa-Francorchamps	7 September	(Belgium) No. 6 Selleslagh Racing Team by Barzani	(Belgium) No. 6 Selleslagh Racing Team by Barzani	(Italy) No. 54 AF Corse
6	R2	(Belgium) Circuit de Spa-Francorchamps	7 September	(United Kingdom) Archie Hamilton (Spain) Isaac Tutumlu	(United Kingdom) Archie Hamilton (Spain) Isaac Tutumlu	(United Kingdom) Duncan Cameron (Republic of Ireland) Matt Griffin
7	R1	(Italy) Autodromo Nazionale Monza	27 September	(Belgium) No. 6 Selleslagh Racing Team by Barzani	(Russia) No. 60 SMP Racing Russian Bears	(Italy) No. 56 AF Corse
7	R1	(Italy) Autodromo Nazionale Monza	27 September	(United Kingdom) Archie Hamilton (Spain) Isaac Tutumlu	(Russia) Roman Mavlanov (Italy) Daniel Zampieri	(Italy) Giorgio Roda (Italy) Paolo Ruberti
7	R2	(Italy) Autodromo Nazionale Monza	28 September	(Netherlands) No. 2 V8 Racing	(Netherlands) No. 2 V8 Racing	(Russia) No. 61 SMP Racing Russian Bears
7	R2	(Italy) Autodromo Nazionale Monza	28 September	(Netherlands) Nicky Pastorelli (Portugal) Miguel Ramos	(Netherlands) Nicky Pastorelli (Portugal) Miguel Ramos	(Russia) Viacheslav Maleev (Spain) José Manuel Pérez-Aicart
8	R1	(Spain) Circuit de Barcelona-Catalunya	1 November	(Russia) No. 60 SMP Racing Russian Bears	(Italy) No. 1 Scuderia Villorba Corse	(United Kingdom) No. 84 Shaun Balfe
8	R1	(Spain) Circuit de Barcelona-Catalunya	1 November	(Russia) Roman Mavlanov (Italy) Daniel Zampieri	(Italy) Andrea Montermini (Italy) Niccolò Schirò	(United Kingdom) Shaun Balfe (United Kingdom) Phil Keen
8	R2	(Spain) Circuit de Barcelona-Catalunya	2 November	(Italy) No. 1 Scuderia Villorba Corse	(Netherlands) No. 2 V8 Racing	(Russia) No. 61 SMP Racing Russian Bears
8	R2	(Spain) Circuit de Barcelona-Catalunya	2 November	(Italy) Andrea Montermini (Italy) Niccolò Schirò	(Netherlands) Nicky Pastorelli (Portugal) Miguel Ramos	(Russia) Viacheslav Maleev (Spain) José Manuel Pérez-Aicart

== Championship standings ==
Scoring system

Position	1st	2nd	3rd	4th	5th
Points	10	8	6	4	3

=== Drivers' Championships ===
For the Drivers' Championships, the best 13 results counted towards the final championship standings. Any other results were discarded.

==== Super GT ====
Pos	Driver	NÜR (Germany)		ALG (Portugal)		JER (Spain)		HUN (Hungary)		SIL (United Kingdom)		SPA (Belgium)		MNZ (Italy)		CAT (Spain)		Total
1	(Russia) Roman Mavlanov (Italy) Daniel Zampieri	2	2	4	12	1	7	4	7	Ret	1	9	2	1	5	2	3	104
2	(Netherlands) Nicky Pastorelli (Portugal) Miguel Ramos	1	4	3	1	7	8	3	1	4	DNS	1	Ret	Ret	1	18	2	99
3	(Italy) Andrea Montermini (Italy) Niccolò Schirò	4	3	2	2	4	1	5	3	10	6	6	3	3	20	1	10	97
4	(Belgium) Maxime Soulet	3	1	1	3	Ret	DNS	16	2	2	8	7	DNS	5	2	3	18	81
5	(Spain) Isaac Tutumlu	Ret	21	1	3	Ret	DNS	16	2	5	3	Ret	1	2	3	9	5	71
6	(United Kingdom) Archie Hamilton	Ret	19	6	DSQ	Ret	4	14	11	5	3	Ret	1	2	3	9	5	62
7	(Netherlands) Diederik Sijthoff	Ret	19	6	DSQ	Ret	4	14	11			7	DNS			3	18	33
8	(United Kingdom) Jody Fannin (United Kingdom) Darren Turner									1	2							18
9	(Netherlands) Nick Catsburg	3	1															16
10	(Netherlands) Kelvin Snoeks													5	2			12
11	(Italy) Francesco Pastorelli									2	8							11
12	(Spain) Álvaro Barba (Denmark) Thomas Fjordbach					10	12											7
13	(Switzerland) Joël Camathias	6	5															6
14	(Italy) Mirko Venturi	6†	5															3
Pos	Driver	NÜR (Germany)		ALG (Portugal)		JER (Spain)		HUN (Hungary)		SIL (United Kingdom)		SPA (Belgium)		MNZ (Italy)		CAT (Spain)		Total

Colour	Result
Gold	Winner
Silver	Second place
Bronze	Third place
Green	Points classification
Blue	Non-points classification
Blue	Non-classified finish (NC)
Purple	Retired, not classified (Ret)
Red	Did not qualify (DNQ)
Red	Did not pre-qualify (DNPQ)
Black	Disqualified (DSQ)
White	Did not start (DNS)
White	Withdrew (WD)
White	Race cancelled (C)
Blank	Did not practice (DNP)
Blank	Did not arrive (DNA)
Blank	Excluded (EX)

==== GTS ====
Pos	Driver	NÜR (Germany)		ALG (Portugal)		JER (Spain)		HUN (Hungary)		SIL (United Kingdom)		SPA (Belgium)		MNZ (Italy)		CAT (Spain)		Total
1	(Italy) Giorgio Roda	10	6	8	8	3	Ret	2	8	6	9	5	Ret	4	8	7	4	86
2	(Spain) José Manuel Pérez Aicart	5	Ret	7	9	6	9	13	4	8	4	12	9	8	4	8	1	77
3	(Russia) Viacheslav Maleev	5	Ret	7	9	6	9	13	4			12	9	8	4	8	1	63
4	(Italy) Paolo Ruberti			8	8	3	Ret	2	8	6	9	5	Ret	4	8			59
5	(Italy) Matteo Beretta (Switzerland) Joël Camathias			10	6	5	5	9	Ret	3	5	11	6	15	12	6	6	59
6	(Portugal) César Campaniço (India) Aditya Patel	13	11	9	11	2	6	8	10	9	7	13	5	14	11	5	15	48
7	(United Kingdom) Duncan Cameron (Republic of Ireland) Matt Griffin	7	10	Ret	14	11	11	12	6			3	4	11	16	10	7	42
8	(Spain) Alan Sicart	11	7	5	10	12	Ret	1	5	Ret	Ret							36
9	(Italy) Stefano Costantini	11	7	5	10	12	Ret					4	Ret	9	7			33
10	(Germany) Claudio Sdanewitsch	8	12	11	4	13	3	11	Ret	7	11	10	10	10	14	12	14	30
11	(Russia) Nikita Zlobin (Italy) Luca Persiani											8	7	6	6	13	Ret	23
12	(Italy) Lorenzo Bontempelli	17	17			8	2							9	7			22
13	(Italy) Michele Rugolo			11	4	13	3	11	Ret			10	10					18
14	(Spain) Álvaro Barba							1	5	Ret	Ret							18
15	(Italy) Stefano Gattuso	16	Ret	13	5	14	13			12	10	4	Ret	12	13			17
16	(Thailand) Pasin Lathouras (United Kingdom) Richard Lyons											2	Ret	7	10			16
17	(Spain) Joan Vinyes									8	4							14
18	(United Kingdom) Craig Dolby					8	2											13
19	(Italy) Andrea Piccini	10	6															13
20	(Italy) Federico Leo	8	12							7	11			10	14	12	14	12
21	(Netherlands) Dennis Retera	12	8	Ret	Ret	9	10	6	Ret	13	Ret							12
22	(Germany) Thomas Jäger (Austria) Mario Plachutta	9	9	12	13			7	Ret									12
23	(Italy) Mario Cordoni	16	Ret	13	5	14	13			12	10			12	13			11
24	(Germany) Daniel Keilwitz							6	Ret	13	Ret							6
25	(Belgium) Dylan Derdaele	12	8	Ret	Ret	9	10											6
26	(Germany) Maximiliam Völker	19	13											Ret	9	11	12	6
27	(Belgium) Adrien de Leener (Monaco) Cédric Sbirrazzuoli			14	7													4
28	(Netherlands) Peter Kox	15	15													11	12	3
29	(Czech Republic) Tomáš Enge	19	13											Ret	9			3
30	(Italy) Andrea Dromedari (Italy) Fabio Mancini							15	12			14	8	13	15			3
31	(Italy) (Monaco) Francesco Castellacci			Ret	DNS			10	9					16	18			3
32	(Switzerland) Thomas Flohr			Ret	DNS			10	9									3
Pos	Driver	NÜR (Germany)		ALG (Portugal)		JER (Spain)		HUN (Hungary)		SIL (United Kingdom)		SPA (Belgium)		MNZ (Italy)		CAT (Spain)		Total
