= Piero Rodarte =

Mexican racing driver

Piero Rodarte is a race car driver born in Mexico on November 30, 1983.

Rodarte competed in Karting in Mexico, winning several National Championships including the Formula Super A championship. From there, he moved to race Formula Reynard in Mexico winning the championship in 1999. In 2000, He raced the USFF2000, having a lot of top-fives and finishing third place at Indianapolis at the famous Night Before the 500. In 2001, he continued to race the USFF2000, having pole positions, several top-three finishes and victories, been the most important the one at the Night Before the 500 in Indianapolis. For 2002 Barber Dodge Pro Series, he finished 12th in the final standings, after a not very lucky season in Barber Dodge. In 2003, he was hired in Mexico by Chrysler to drive for the official Mopar Neon team, winning the Neon Challenge Championship. In 2004, Rodarte raced the F3 Winter Cup in Spain, having a great race, and fighting for the overall win at the rain with Nico Rosberg, he finished third, and in 2005 returned to motorsport with the Spanish Formula Three Championship team ECA having several pole positions and victories, he ended the season in third place even though he started the season at the third race due to the lack of sponsors and budget to complete the whole season. Now he is retired from professional racing and Piero owns a Formula Renault Team in Mexico and combines this with driver coaching in the US, and with his duties as a professional airplane pilot.

Rodarte is now race engineer for Campos racing at F4 Spanish Championship and at the Eurocup 3 Championship.

== Complete motorsports results ==
=== American Open-Wheel racing results ===
(key) (Races in bold indicate pole position, races in italics indicate fastest race lap)

==== Complete USF2000 National Championship results ====
Year	Entrant	1	2	3	4	5	6	7	8	9	10	11	12	13	14	Pos	Points
1999	Espiritu de Mexico	PIR	CHA1	CHA2	MOS	MOS	MOH	ATL	ROA1	ROA2	CTR	MOH	PPI	SEB1; 11	SEB2; 10	**N.C.**	**N.C.**
2000	Espiritu de Mexico	PIR; 23	MOS1; 12	MOS2; 14	IRP1; 11	ROA1; 8	ROA1; 35	TRR; 26	MOS3; 8	WGI1; 11	WGI2; 14	IRP2; 3	ATL1; 20	ATL1; 25		**11th**	**94**
2001	Roquin Motorsports	HMS1; 27	HMS2; 12	HMS3; 7	WGI1; 8	WGI2; 10	IRP; 1	MOH1; 7	MOH2; 23	ROA1; 4	ROA2; 3	MOH3; 5	**SEB1**; 3	SEB2; 4		**4th**	**192**

==== Barber Dodge Pro Series ====
Year	1	2	3	4	5	6	7	8	9	10	Rank	Points
2002	SEB; 15	LRP; 11	LAG; 12	POR; 9	TOR; 14	CLE; 8	VAN; 15	MOH; 13	ROA	MTL; 6	**12th**	**41**
