= Spanish GT Championship =

Auto racing series

- Category: Grand tourer sportscars
- Country: Spain; Portugal
- Inaugural season: 1999
- Folded: 2013
- Tyre suppliers: Dunlop
- Last Drivers' champion: (Greece) Dimitris Deverikos (Spain) Isaac Tutumlu

The Spanish GT Championship / Iber GT (Campeonato de España de GT / Iber GT) was a Spanish auto racing series founded in 1999 and organised by the GT Sport Organización. The series runs multiple classes of grand tourer cars in events around Spain and Portugal. The series later formed the basis for the International GT Open, a European-wide series which follows a similar structure.

== Format ==
For racing events, Spanish GT has changed very little since its inception. Each event consists of two races of equal distance, one run on Saturday and the other on Sunday. Each race has its own qualifying session to determine the grid. The races both count towards the points championship, effectively doubling the series schedule.

Initially, three classes of cars were used for the series, termed GT2, GT3, and GT4. This was soon replaced by the GTA, GTB, and GTC classes. These cars ranged from the FIA's GT2 class equivalent down to cars from one make series. The slowest class, GTC, was eliminated in 2001, only to return in 2004. A new GTS class was introduced in 2005, initially for the custom-built SEAT Toledo GT, but was adapted in 2006 to use cars from the FIA GT3 European Championship, originally without scoring points in the first year.

In the current format, the GTA class is dominated by the Ferrari F430 GT2, Porsche 911 GT3-RSR, Mosler MT900R, and the custom-built Sun Red SR21. GTS uses GT3 versions of the Ferrari F430, Porsche 911, Lamborghini Gallardo and Dodge Viper Competition Coupe. GTB is retained for one-make cup regulation versions of the F430 and 911, as well as the Marcos Mantis.

The Spanish GT Championship shares several race weekends with the European F3 Open Championship, also run by the GT Sport Organización.

== Champions ==
An overall combined drivers championship is awarded each season, adding overall points to class points, which can mean a driver from a lower class of car can be crowned the series champion. Along with this, each individual class also awards their own champion.

| Season | Overall | GT2 | GT3 | GT4 |
|---|---|---|---|---|
| 1999 | (Spain) Antonio Puig (Spain) Javier Camp | (Spain) Carlos Palau | (Spain) Antonio Puig (Spain) Javier Camp | (Spain) Ángel Romero (Spain) Manuel Rosado Domínguez |
| | Overall | GTA | GTB | GTC |
| 2000 | (Spain) Miguel Ángel de Castro (Spain) Balba Camino | (Spain) Miguel Ángel de Castro (Spain) Balba Camino | (Spain) Fermín Vélez (Spain) Javier Díaz | (Spain) Luis C. Maurel |
| 2001 | (Spain) Alberto Castello (Spain) Carlos Palau | (Spain) Alberto Castello (Spain) Carlos Palau | (Spain) Javier Díaz | |
| 2002 | (Portugal) Miguel Ramos (Portugal) Pedro Chaves | (Portugal) Miguel Ramos (Portugal) Pedro Chaves | (Spain) Juan Bastos | |
| 2003 | (Spain) Gines Vivancos | (Spain) Miguel Ángel de Castro (Spain) Balba Camino | (Spain) Luis Pérez-Sala (Andorra) Manuel Cerqueda | (Spain) Enrique de la Cuerda (Spain) Jorge Enríquez |
| 2004 | (United Kingdom) Shaun Balfe (United Kingdom) Nigel Taylor | (Spain) Miguel Ángel de Castro (Spain) Angel Burgueño | (Spain) Luis Pérez-Sala (Andorra) Manuel Cerqueda | (Andorra) Francesc Robert |
| 2005 | (Italy) Giambattista Giannoccaro | (Italy) Giambattista Giannoccaro | (Portugal) Pedro Bastos (Portugal) Miguel Cristóvão | (Spain) José Luis Bermúdez de Castro |
| 2006 | (Italy) Michele Bartyan | (Italy) Michele Bartyan | (Spain) César Rodrigo (Spain) Daniel Rodrigo | |
| 2007 | (Sweden) Peter Sundberg (Spain) Domingo Romero | (Sweden) Peter Sundberg (Spain) Domingo Romero | (Spain) Óscar Fernández (Spain) José Manuel Pérez-Aicart | |
| | Overall | GTA | GTS | GTB |
| 2008 | (Sweden) Peter Sundberg | (Sweden) Peter Sundberg | (Spain) Javier Díaz | (Spain) Antonio Puig (Spain) Alfredo Palencia |
| | Overall | Super GT | GTS | GT Light |
| 2009 | (Portugal) Lourenço Beirão da Veiga (Portugal) Ricardo Bravo | (Portugal) Lourenço Beirão da Veiga (Portugal) Ricardo Bravo | (Spain) Antonio Castro (Spain) Jesús Diez Villarroel | (United Kingdom) Ben Clucas (Portugal) Francisco Lorena |
| 2010 | (Portugal) Francisco Cruz Martins | (Portugal) Manuel Gião (Argentina) Juan Manuel López | (Portugal) César Campaniço (Portugal) João Figueiredo | (Spain) Oliver Campos-Hull (Greece) Kosta Kanaroglou |
| 2011 | (Portugal) Manuel Gião | (Portugal) Manuel Gião | (Portugal) César Campaniço (Portugal) João Figueiredo | (Spain) Miguel Toril (Spain) Pol Rosell |
| 2012 | (Finland) Mikko Eskelinen | (Finland) Mikko Eskelinen | (Spain) Rafael Unzurrunzaga | (Spain) Francesc Gutiérrez (Spain) Luis Villalba |
| | Overall | Super GT | GTS | Gentlemen |
| 2013 | (Spain) Isaac Tutumlu (Greece) Dimitris Deverikos | (Spain) Isaac Tutumlu (Greece) Dimitris Deverikos | not attributed | (Belarus) Alexander Talkanitsa Sr. |
