= 2005 British Formula 3 International Series =

Seasons
- ← 2004 2006 →

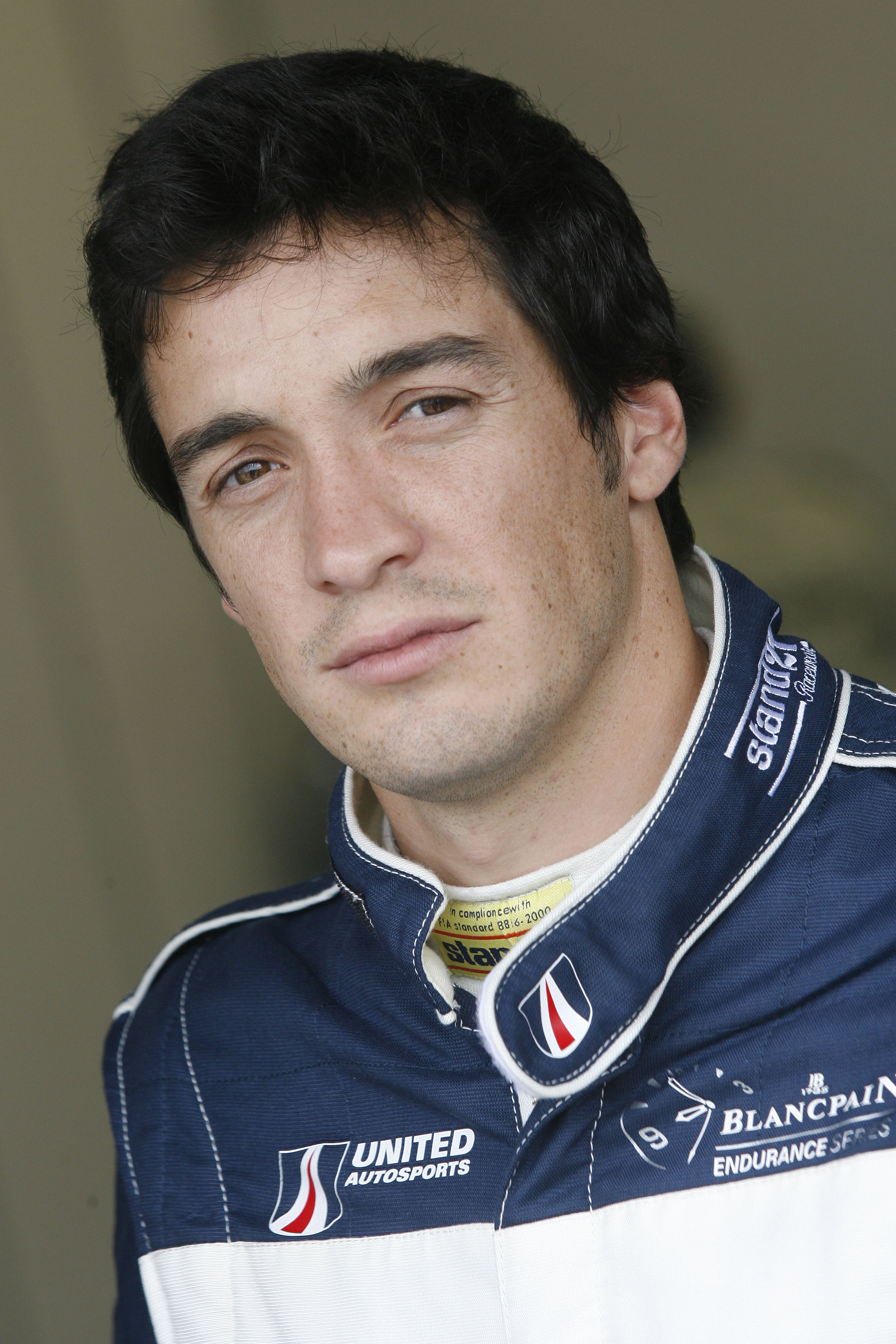
Championship Class champion, Álvaro Parente

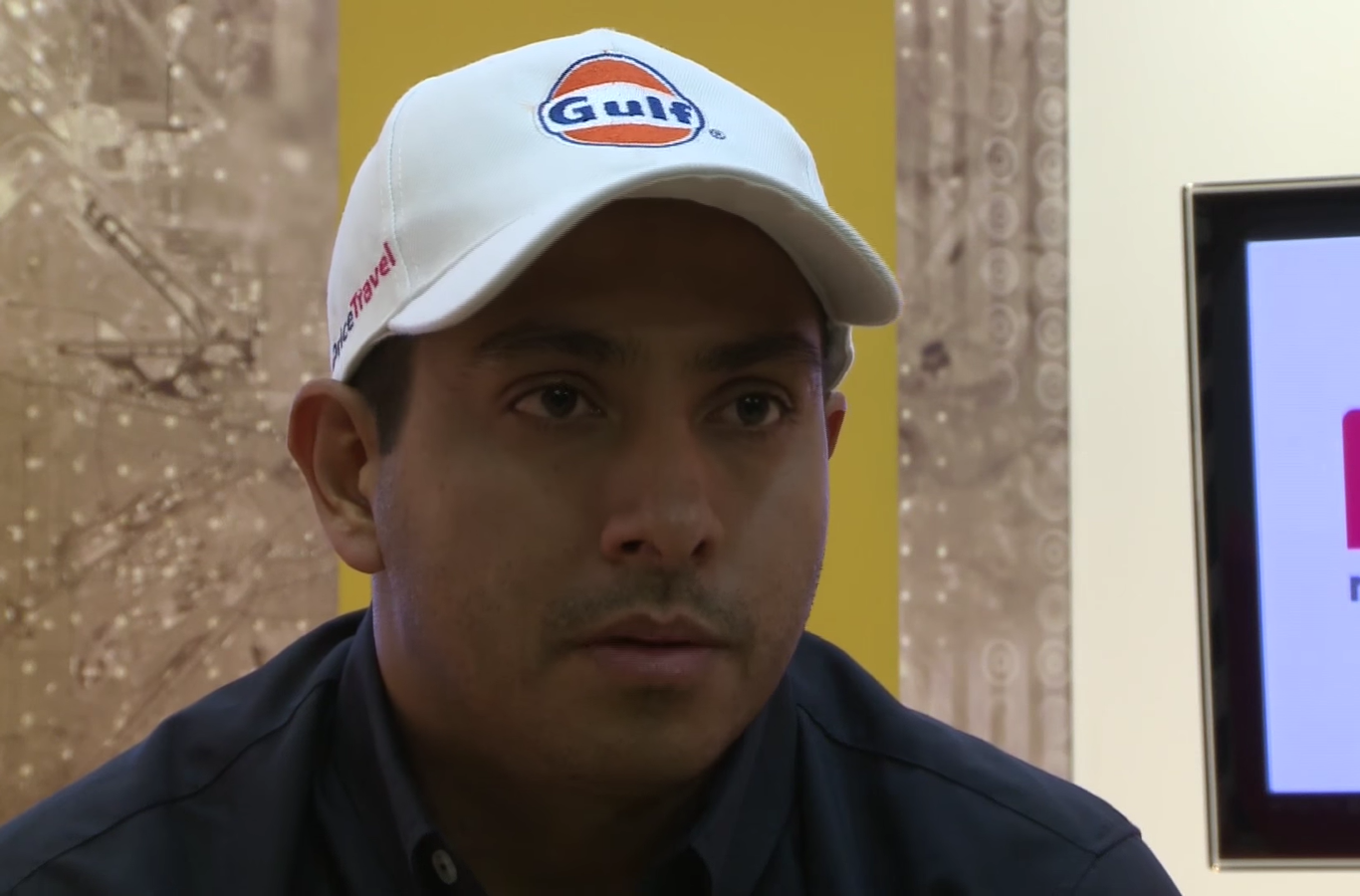
National Class champion, Salvador Durán

The 2005 British Formula 3 International Series was the 55th British Formula 3 International Series season. It commenced on 2 April 2005 and ended on 9 October after twenty two races.

The scoring system was 20-15-12-10-8-6-4-3-2-1 points awarded to the first ten finishers, with one extra point added to the driver who set the fastest lap of the race. If a Class B driver or a guest driver finished among the top finishers, he would not score points for the main championship, and the points would be awarded to the next driver in the standings.

== Drivers and teams ==
The following teams and drivers were competitors in the 2005 British Formula 3 International Series. The National class is for year-old Formula Three cars. Teams in the Invitation class are not series regulars, and do not compete for championship points.

Team	Chassis	Engine	No	Driver	Rounds
Championship Class
(United Kingdom) P1 Motorsport	Lola B05/30	Mugen-Honda	1	(Brazil) Danilo Dirani	All
(United Kingdom) Fortec Motorsport	Dallara F305	Opel	2	(United Kingdom) James Walker	All
(United Kingdom) Fortec Motorsport	Dallara F305	Opel	3	(Republic of Ireland) Ronayne O'Mahony	1-10
(United Kingdom) Fortec Motorsport	Dallara F305	Opel	3	(Netherlands) Yelmer Buurman	11
(United Kingdom) Fortec Motorsport	Dallara F305	Opel	26	(United Kingdom) Mike Conway	All
(United Kingdom) Carlin Motorsport	Dallara F305	Mugen-Honda	4	(Denmark) Christian Bakkerud	All
(United Kingdom) Carlin Motorsport	Dallara F305	Mugen-Honda	5	(Japan) Keiko Ihara	All
(United Kingdom) Carlin Motorsport	Dallara F305	Mugen-Honda	6	(United States) Charlie Kimball	All
(United Kingdom) Carlin Motorsport	Dallara F305	Mugen-Honda	14	(Portugal) Álvaro Parente	2-10
(United Kingdom) Alan Docking Racing	Dallara F305	Mugen-Honda	7	(United Kingdom) Susie Stoddart	1
(United Kingdom) Alan Docking Racing	Dallara F305	Mugen-Honda	7	(United Kingdom) Danny Watts	6
(United Kingdom) Alan Docking Racing	Dallara F305	Mugen-Honda	7	(Australia) Karl Reindler	7-11
(United Kingdom) Promatecme	Lola B05/30	Mugen-Honda	8	(United Kingdom) Steven Kane	All
(United Kingdom) Menu F3 Motorsport	Dallara F305	Opel	9	(United Kingdom) Stephen Jelley	All
(United Kingdom) Hitech Racing	Dallara F305	Mugen-Honda	11	(United Kingdom) Tim Bridgman	1-9, 11
(United Kingdom) Hitech Racing	Dallara F305	Mugen-Honda	12	(Estonia) Marko Asmer	All
(United Kingdom) Räikkönen Robertson Racing	Dallara F305	Mugen-Honda	27	(United Kingdom) Dan Clarke	All
(United Kingdom) Räikkönen Robertson Racing	Dallara F305	Mugen-Honda	28	(Brazil) Bruno Senna	All
(United Kingdom) T-Sport	Dallara F305	Mugen-Honda	69	(United Kingdom) Ryan Lewis	All
National Class
(United Kingdom) T-Sport	Dallara F304	Mugen-Honda	31	(Australia) Barton Mawer	All
(United Kingdom) Performance Racing Europe	Dallara F304	Mugen-Honda	32	(India) Suk Sandher	1-2
(United Kingdom) Performance Racing Europe	Dallara F304	Mugen-Honda	32	(United Kingdom) Adam Khan	6-7
(United Kingdom) Performance Racing Europe	Dallara F304	Mugen-Honda	32	(United Kingdom) James Jakes	11
(United Kingdom) Promatecme	Lola-Dome F106/4	Mugen-Honda	33	(United Kingdom) Charlie Hollings	All
(United Kingdom) Carlin Motorsport	Dallara F304	Mugen-Honda	34	(Angola) Ricardo Teixeira	1-8
(United Kingdom) Alan Docking Racing	Dallara F304	Mugen-Honda	35	(Finland) Juho Annala	All
(United Kingdom) Alan Docking Racing	Dallara F304	Mugen-Honda	36	(United Kingdom) Jonathan Kennard	All
(United Kingdom) Edenbridge Racing	Dallara F304	Mugen-Honda	38	(Macau) Cheong Lou Meng	All
(United Kingdom) Team SWR Crypton	Dallara F304	Mugen-Honda	40	(United Kingdom) Josh Fisher	All
(United Kingdom) Team SWR Crypton	Dallara F304	Mugen-Honda	41	(United States) Nick Jones	All
(United Kingdom) P1 Motorsport	Dallara F304	Mugen-Honda	42	(Mexico) Salvador Durán	All
(United Kingdom) Fluid Motorsport	Lola-Dome F106/4	Mugen-Honda	84	(United Kingdom) Ben Clucas	6-8, 11
Invitation Entries
(Belgium) Junior Racing	Dallara F305	Opel	71	(Belgium) Michael Herck	2, 8-9
(Austria) HBR Motorsport	Dallara F305	Opel	74	(Spain) Alejandro Núñez	7-8
(Austria) HBR Motorsport	Dallara F305	Opel	75	(Austria) Christopher Wassermann	7

== Calendar and results ==
The Spa, Monza, Silverstone and Nürburgring races were held supporting the Le Mans Series. The remaining rounds supported the British GT Championship.

Round	Circuit	Date	Pole Position	Fastest Lap	Winning driver	Winning team	National Class Winner
1	(United Kingdom) Donington Park	2 April	(Brazil) Danilo Dirani	(United Kingdom) Ryan Lewis	(Brazil) Danilo Dirani	(United Kingdom) P1 Motorsport	(United Kingdom) Josh Fisher
2	(United Kingdom) Donington Park	3 April	(Estonia) Marko Asmer	(Estonia) Marko Asmer	(Brazil) Danilo Dirani	(United Kingdom) P1 Motorsport	(Australia) Barton Mawer
3	(Belgium) Spa-Francorchamps	16 April	Meeting cancelled^{1}				
4	(Belgium) Spa-Francorchamps	17 April	Meeting cancelled^{1}				
5	(United Kingdom) Croft	8 May	(Portugal) Álvaro Parente	(United Kingdom) Mike Conway	(United Kingdom) Mike Conway	(United Kingdom) Fortec Motorsport	(Mexico) Salvador Durán
6	(United Kingdom) Croft	8 May	(Portugal) Álvaro Parente	(United Kingdom) Dan Clarke	(Portugal) Álvaro Parente	(United Kingdom) Carlin Motorsport	(Mexico) Salvador Durán
7	(United Kingdom) Knockhill	21 May	(Portugal) Álvaro Parente	(United Kingdom) Steven Kane	(Portugal) Álvaro Parente	(United Kingdom) Carlin Motorsport	(United Kingdom) Charlie Hollings
8	(United Kingdom) Knockhill	22 May	(Portugal) Álvaro Parente	(United Kingdom) Ryan Lewis	(Portugal) Álvaro Parente	(United Kingdom) Carlin Motorsport	(United Kingdom) Charlie Hollings
9	(United Kingdom) Thruxton	28 May	(United States) Charlie Kimball	(Denmark) Christian Bakkerud	(United States) Charlie Kimball	(United Kingdom) Carlin Motorsport	(Australia) Barton Mawer
10	(United Kingdom) Thruxton	29 May	(United States) Charlie Kimball	(United States) Charlie Kimball	(United States) Charlie Kimball	(United Kingdom) Carlin Motorsport	(Australia) Barton Mawer
11	(United Kingdom) Castle Combe	25 June	(United States) Charlie Kimball	(United Kingdom) Dan Clarke	(United Kingdom) Dan Clarke	(United Kingdom) Räikkönen Robertson Racing	(Mexico) Salvador Durán
12	(United Kingdom) Castle Combe	26 June	(Portugal) Álvaro Parente	(United States) Charlie Kimball	(Portugal) Álvaro Parente	(United Kingdom) Carlin Motorsport	(Australia) Barton Mawer
13	(Italy) Monza	9 July	(United States) Charlie Kimball	(United States) Charlie Kimball	(Portugal) Álvaro Parente	(United Kingdom) Carlin Motorsport	(Australia) Barton Mawer
14	(Italy) Monza	9 July	(Portugal) Álvaro Parente	(Portugal) Álvaro Parente	(Portugal) Álvaro Parente	(United Kingdom) Carlin Motorsport	(United Kingdom) Ben Clucas
3^{1}	(Italy) Monza	10 July	(Portugal) Álvaro Parente	(Portugal) Álvaro Parente	(Portugal) Álvaro Parente	(United Kingdom) Carlin Motorsport	(Mexico) Salvador Durán
4^{1}	(United Kingdom) Silverstone (Grand Prix)	13 August	(United Kingdom) Steven Kane	(United States) Charlie Kimball	(United States) Charlie Kimball	(United Kingdom) Carlin Motorsport	(United Kingdom) Charlie Hollings
15	(United Kingdom) Silverstone (Grand Prix)	14 August	(Portugal) Álvaro Parente	(Portugal) Álvaro Parente	(Portugal) Álvaro Parente	(United Kingdom) Carlin Motorsport	(Mexico) Salvador Durán
16	(United Kingdom) Silverstone (Grand Prix)	14 August	(Estonia) Marko Asmer	(Portugal) Álvaro Parente	(Portugal) Álvaro Parente	(United Kingdom) Carlin Motorsport	(Mexico) Salvador Durán
17	(Germany) Nürburgring	3 September	(Portugal) Álvaro Parente	(United Kingdom) James Walker	(United Kingdom) James Walker	(United Kingdom) Fortec Motorsport	(Mexico) Salvador Durán
18	(Germany) Nürburgring	3 September	(Brazil) Bruno Senna	(Portugal) Álvaro Parente	(Portugal) Álvaro Parente	(United Kingdom) Carlin Motorsport	(Mexico) Salvador Durán
19	(Republic of Ireland) Mondello Park	17 September	(United Kingdom) Steven Kane	(Portugal) Álvaro Parente	(Portugal) Álvaro Parente	(United Kingdom) Carlin Motorsport	(Australia) Barton Mawer
20	(Republic of Ireland) Mondello Park	18 September	(United Kingdom) Steven Kane	(Portugal) Álvaro Parente	(United Kingdom) Steven Kane	(United Kingdom) Promatecme	(United Kingdom) Jonathan Kennard
21	(United Kingdom) Silverstone (International)	8 October	(United States) Charlie Kimball	(United States) Charlie Kimball	(United States) Charlie Kimball	(United Kingdom) Carlin Motorsport	(United Kingdom) Charlie Hollings
22	(United Kingdom) Silverstone (International)	9 October	(United States) Charlie Kimball	(United States) Charlie Kimball	(United States) Charlie Kimball	(United Kingdom) Carlin Motorsport	(Mexico) Salvador Durán

Notes:

1. – The Spa meeting was cancelled due to poor weather conditions. The meeting's races were run at Monza and the first Silverstone meeting.

== Standings ==
=== Championship Class ===
Pos	Driver	DON (United Kingdom)		SPA (Belgium)		CRO (United Kingdom)		KNO (United Kingdom)		THR (United Kingdom)		CAS (United Kingdom)		MNZ (Italy)			SIL (United Kingdom)			NÜR (Germany)		MON (Republic of Ireland)		SIL (United Kingdom)		Pts
1	(Portugal) Álvaro Parente			C	C	3	1	1	1	5	13	2	1	1	1	1	2	1	1	3	1	1	Ret			289
2	(United States) Charlie Kimball	16	10	C	C	9	Ret	Ret	3	1	1	3	Ret	2	2	2	1	2	2	7	5	4	3	1	1	246
3	(United Kingdom) Mike Conway	2	3	C	C	1	14	3	Ret	4	5	6	7	4	4	21	6	3	Ret	2	4	2	5	5	4	194
4	(Estonia) Marko Asmer	8	2	C	C	2	7	Ret	2	2	2	9	4	Ret	DNS	6	5	4	5	6	6	11	18	4	3	163
5	(United Kingdom) Dan Clarke	3	4	C	C	Ret	3	Ret	5	9	6	1	3	Ret	DNS	14	3	5	6	9	3	6	6	3	5	158
6	(Brazil) Danilo Dirani	1	1	C	C	Ret	NC	5	9	7	Ret	7	5	3	3	20	4	6	7	4	7	5	Ret	2	8	150
7	(Denmark) Christian Bakkerud	5	6	C	C	4	2	6	7	3	3	8	6	5	12	3	16	7	9	8	13	7	Ret	6	Ret	124
8	(United Kingdom) Ryan Lewis	4	7	C	C	7	4	2	8	6	4	4	Ret	Ret	5	4	Ret	10	14	14	8	15	2	Ret	6	121
9	(United Kingdom) Steven Kane	7	5	C	C	Ret	9	4	4	8	7	10	17	22	8	7	18	Ret	4	10	10	3	1	19	9	97
10	(Brazil) Bruno Senna	6	Ret	C	C	Ret	5	14	DNS	11	Ret	12	10	Ret	6	5	Ret	Ret	3	Ret	2	12	14	Ret	2	75
11	(United Kingdom) James Walker	11	8	C	C	14	8	Ret	6	10	8	19	8	Ret	23	Ret	17	9	8	1	25	8	4	9	7	69
12	(United Kingdom) Stephen Jelley	Ret	14	C	C	Ret	16	11	Ret	13	10	14	9	16	7	8	8	11	10	11	19	9	13	8	11	30
13	(United Kingdom) Danny Watts											5	2													23
14	(Republic of Ireland) Ronayne O'Mahony	15	19	C	C	12	15	15	Ret	12	11	13	14	6	10	Ret	Ret	16	13	20	16	10	11			21
15	(United Kingdom) Tim Bridgman	Ret	9	C	C	Ret	Ret	Ret	Ret	Ret	15	11	Ret	Ret	DSQ	DSQ	Ret	8	DNS	5	9			Ret	10	16
16	(Australia) Karl Reindler													10	11			Ret	Ret	15	11	Ret	12	7	15	12
17	(Japan) Keiko Ihara	18	16	C	C	13	Ret	16	15	20	18	22	20	19	21	15	9	19	20	Ret	21	Ret	Ret	17	17	12
18	(United Kingdom) Susie Stoddart	9	11																							2
19	(Netherlands) Yelmer Buurman																							Ret	13	0
Guest drivers ineligible for points
	(Belgium) Michael Herck			C	C												10	14	16	13	12					0
	(Spain) Alejandro Núñez													14	13			18	Ret							0
	(Austria) Christopher Wassermann													18	18											0
National Class
1	(Mexico) Salvador Durán	Ret	13	C	C	5	6	8	14	Ret	16	15	15	8	14	9	Ret	12	11	12	14	NC	9	13	12	300
2	(Australia) Barton Mawer	12	12	C	C	6	10	10	11	14	9	20	11	7	22	12	Ret	25	17	19	17	13	Ret	12	Ret	256
3	(United Kingdom) Jonathan Kennard	14	Ret	C	C	10	12	13	12	15	17	17	13	15	17	13	11	15	18	16	22	14	7	11	18	233
4	(United Kingdom) Josh Fisher	10	15	C	C	8	13	9	Ret	17	21	16	19	12	16	10	12	20	15	21	15	17	10	15	16	221
5	(United Kingdom) Charlie Hollings	13	Ret	C	C	Ret	17	7	10	16	12	24	12	11	Ret	11	7	17	Ret	17	18	Ret	8	10	Ret	216
6	(Finland) Juho Annala	17	18	C	C	11	11	12	13	18	14	21	18	17	19	16	Ret	21	19	18	20	16	15	Ret	21	155
7	(United Kingdom) Ben Clucas											18	16	9	9			13	12					14	14	103
8	(United States) Nick Jones	19	20	C	C	15	18	Ret	16	Ret	Ret	Ret	Ret	Ret	20	19	15	24	22	23	23	Ret	16	18	19	69
9	(Angola) Ricardo Teixeira	21	21	C	C	16	Ret	17	17	19	19	23	21	21	24	17	13	22	21							61
10	(Macau) Cheong Lou Meng	20	Ret	C	C	17	Ret	Ret	18	21	20	Ret	DNS	20	Ret	18	14	23	Ret	22	24	18	17	Ret	20	59
11	(United Kingdom) Adam Khan											Ret	Ret	13	15											18
12	(India) Suk Sandher	Ret	17	C	C																					10
13	(United Kingdom) James Jakes																							16	Ret	4
Pos	Driver	DON (United Kingdom)		SPA (Belgium)		CRO (United Kingdom)		KNO (United Kingdom)		THR (United Kingdom)		CAS (United Kingdom)		MNZ (Italy)			SIL (United Kingdom)			NÜR (Germany)		MON (Republic of Ireland)		SIL (United Kingdom)		Pts

Colour	Result
Gold	Winner
Silver	Second place
Bronze	Third place
Green	Points classification
Blue	Non-points classification
Blue	Non-classified finish (NC)
Purple	Retired, not classified (Ret)
Red	Did not qualify (DNQ)
Red	Did not pre-qualify (DNPQ)
Black	Disqualified (DSQ)
White	Did not start (DNS)
White	Withdrew (WD)
White	Race cancelled (C)
Blank	Did not practice (DNP)
Blank	Did not arrive (DNA)
Blank	Excluded (EX)
