= Manuel Gião =

Portuguese racing driver

- Nationality: Portuguese
- Born: 28 June 1971 (age 55) Lisbon (Portugal)

Spanish GT Championship career
- Current team: Drivex
- Former teams: Draco Racing Van Amersfoort Racing

Championship titles
- 2010, 2011: Spanish GT (Super GT class)

Manuel Gião (born 28 June 1971, in Lisbon) is a Portuguese racing driver. He has competed in such series as the Euro Open by Nissan, the Italian Formula 3000, the International GT Open, and the German Formula Three Championship. He represented Portugal many times in the EFDA Nations Cup.

Gião was the Spanish GT Championship Super GT class joint-champion in 2010, and the overall champion in 2011.
