= Alejandro Núñez =

Spanish racing driver (born 1984)

- Nationality: (Spain) Spanish
- Born: February 25, 1984 (age 42) Madrid, Spain

Spanish F3 career
- Debut season: 2002
- Current team: Meycom
- Car number: 9
- Former teams: Scualo Competicion; Elide Racing; E.V. Racing; Azteca Motorsport; GTA Motor
- Starts: 37
- Wins: 0
- Poles: 0
- Fastest laps: 0
- Best finish: 10th (27 pts) in 2004

Previous series
- 2004–06 2005 2007: F3 Euroseries; British F3; World Series by Renault

Alejandro Núñez (born 25 February 1984 in Madrid, Spain) is a Spanish racing driver who is currently competing in the Porsche Supercup, Spanish Formula 3 and, most recently, has signed with the Trident Racing team to compete in the International Formula Master series. He is best known for competing in the World Series by Renault in 2007, driving for Red Devil Team Comtec.

== Racing record ==
=== Complete Formula Renault 3.5 Series results ===
(key) (Races in bold indicate pole position) (Races in italics indicate fastest lap)

Year	Team	1	2	3	4	5	6	7	8	9	10	11	12	13	14	15	16	17	Pos	Points
2007	Red Devil Team Comtec	MNZ; 1 Ret	MNZ; 2; 13	NÜR; 1; 13	NÜR; 2; 11	MON; 1 Ret	HUN; 1; 8	HUN; 2; 1	SPA; 1; 11	SPA; 2; 8	DON; 1; 14	DON; 2; 9	MAG; 1; 13	MAG; 2; 9	EST; 1 Ret	EST; 2; 22	CAT; 1; 10	**CAT**; **2**; 3	18th	31
