= José Manuel Pérez-Aicart =

Spanish racing driver

Medal record
Karting
Representing Spain
FIA Motorsport Games
Silver medal – second place	2022 France	Karting Endurance Cup

José Manuel Pérez-Aicart (born 3 July 1982 in Castellón) is a Spanish former racing driver.

== Career ==
=== Single-seaters ===
Pérez-Aicart secured a third-place finish in the 2001 Spanish Formula Three Championship. He then progressed to the Formula Nissan 2000 series in 2002, where he achieved a fourth-place finish. In 2003, Pérez-Aicart competed in both Spanish F3 and World Series by Nissan, and continued in Spanish F3 in 2004, and in 2005, when he was runner-up to Andy Soucek.

=== GTs and Touring cars ===
Pérez-Aicart achieved a second-place finish in the 2006 International GT Open and secured fifth place in the Spanish GT Championship. In 2007, he won the GTB class of the Spanish GT Championship and the SEAT Leon Supercopa. He was rewarded for winning the Leon Supercopa with a one-off appearance for SEAT Sport in the World Touring Car Championship at the 2008 Race of Spain. He also raced in Spanish GT and the International GT Open for Sun-Red.
