= Euroformula Open Championship =

Single-Seater Racing Championship

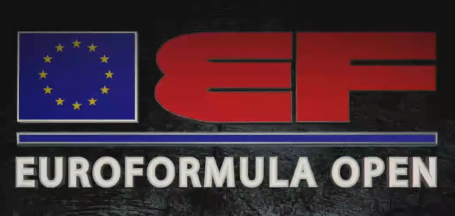
- Euroformula Open logo
- Category: Single seaters
- Country: Europe
- Inaugural season: 2001
- Drivers: 10 (2024)
- Teams: 4 (2024)
- Constructors: Dallara
- Engine suppliers: Mercedes; Volkswagen
- Tyre suppliers: Pirelli
- Drivers' champion: (Poland) Tymek Kucharczyk
- Teams' champion: (Germany) Team Motopark
- Official website: http://www.euroformulaopen.net/

The Euroformula Open Championship (formerly the Spanish Formula Three Championship, European F3 Open Championship) is a junior formula racing series based in Spain. It was one of six national and international Formula Three championships in Europe that together used to form an important part of the established "career ladder" below Formula One. The championship's first season was held in 2001. In 2006, it was branded as the Spanish F3 Championship by Toyota, in deference to its sole engine supplier. In 2020, the championship ceased to be a F3-championship and will share its specifications with Japan's Super Formula Lights based on the previous-generation Formula Three standards, primarily with a choice of engines.

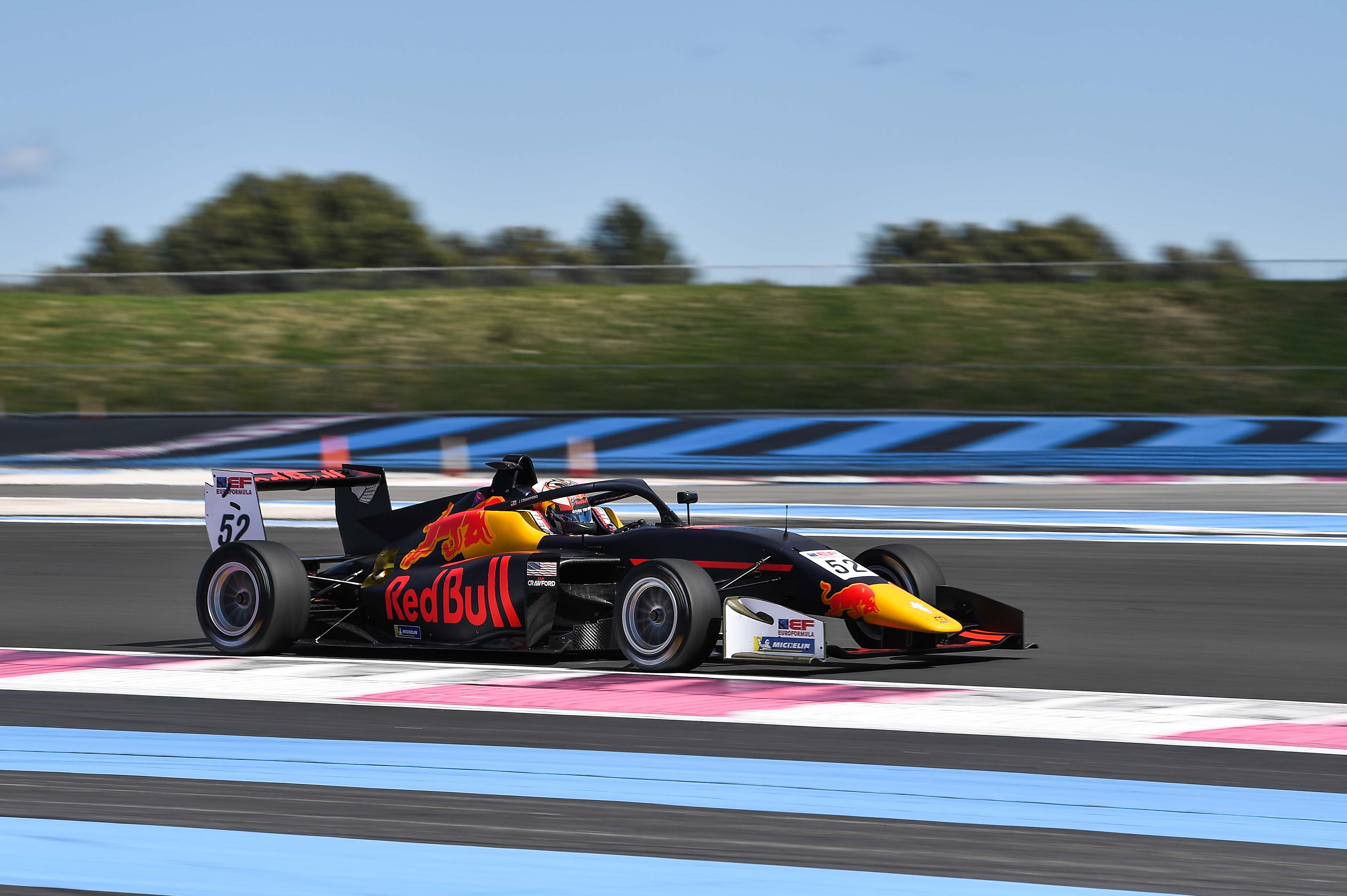
EuroFormula car in 2021

== Profile ==
The Spanish Formula Three Championship was formed during Spain's recent growth period in motor racing that began with the Euro Open Movistar by Nissan, which eventually became the World Series by Renault when the two companies' motor racing programs were reorganised. The new championship replaced the previously existing Super Formula Toyota, a one-make series with performance similar to F3.

The European F3 Open championship has become successful by actively taking measures to control budget requirements. This provides a more achievable option for drivers who lack the major sponsorship portfolio that is required by leading Euroseries teams, and would otherwise have to look elsewhere for their next step up the career ladder.

With Renault's backing, the World Series has developed into a championship from which drivers can reach Formula One, and three major Spanish teams are established in GP2. This has fostered new opportunities for the graduates of Spanish F3, which has, in turn, made the championship itself a success.

In recent years the Championship has become much less centred in Spain, with races across Europe, and has successfully attracted famous non-Spanish teams to take part. The first was the British outfit Team West-Tec who went on to win two Driver's Championship titles in their first three seasons, and which were followed a year later by Italy's RP Motorsport who have won races each year since joining.

The championship was renamed to Euroformula Open Championship for 2014, after the FIA restricted the use of the Formula Three name to championships that do not follow the current engine regulations.

== Sub-divisions ==
Like British Formula Three, the series incorporates a second championship class for chassis specifications from the previous generation. The Copa was created in 2005, and provides an opportunity for drivers without competitive budgets, who would otherwise be left unable to progress from cheaper formulae. The name is derived from the chassis specification that all Copa entrants must use: the Dallara F308.

== Equipment ==
The Euroformula Open Championship has used chassis from Italian constructor Dallara. During the first seasons, the Dallara F300 was used. The Dallara F305 debuted in 2005, the Dallara F308 in 2008, and the Dallara F312 in 2012. The secondary class was dropped during the 2014 season due to lack of entries. The current chassis is the Dallara 324, which debuted in Super Formula Lights in 2024, and has been chosen for Euroformula Open for the 2025, putting more emphasis on the affordability of this series.

Originally, the European F3 Open Championship had a single engine supplier. From 2010 to 2018, the series used Toyota's F3 engine upgraded by the Spanish tuner Piedrafita Sport. In 2019, the series also allowed Mercedes-Benz and Volkswagen engines, and the Toyota engines were dropped after the first round of the season.

== F1 tests ==
The exclusive use of the Toyota engine prompted Toyota to offer a Formula One test to each year's champion. The first driver to benefit from this was 2004 champion Borja García, who later graduated to GP2.

== Venues ==
Between 2001 and 2005, the Spanish F3 Championship had seven rounds, each with two races. Exceptions to this included the Valencia round in 2002 and the Jerez round in 2003, each of which had only one race, and Albacete, which held a single-race event in addition to its regular two-race event in 2005.

In every season from its inception until 2007, the championship made a regular visit to Estoril in Portugal. The 2006 season, which was expanded to eight rounds, included the championship's first visit to Magny-Cours in France.

Since 2008, many circuits from further afield have been added to the schedule including visits to Magny Cours, Donington Park and Brands Hatch with major European motorsport venues including Spa, Monza, Silverstone and Hungaroring hosting rounds of the 2014 season as the series expands further into Europe.

From 2001, the circuits used in the Euroformula Open Championship are listed as:

- **Bold** denotes a circuit is used in the 2026 season.
- **Italic** denotes a future circuit will be used in the 2027 season.

Number	Circuits	Rounds	Years
1	(Spain) **Circuit de Barcelona-Catalunya**	26	2001–present
2	(Spain) Circuito de Jerez	20 (Note: Circuito de Jerez hosted 2 rounds in 2002–2004, and 2007.)	2002–2011, 2013–2018
3	(Belgium) **Circuit de Spa-Francorchamps**	19	2008–present
4	(Italy) **Monza Circuit**	18	2009–present
5	(France) **Circuit Paul Ricard**	14	2012–2013, 2015–present
6	(Spain) Circuit Ricardo Tormo	13 (Note: Circuit Ricardo Tormo hosted 2 rounds in 2005–2006.)	2001–2011
7	(Portugal) Circuito do Estoril	12	2001–2007, 2015–2018, 2022
7	(Hungary) **Hungaroring**	12	2012, 2014, 2017–present
9	(Spain) Circuito del Jarama	11 (Note: Circuito del Jarama hosted 2 rounds in 2001.)	2001–2010
10	(Spain) Circuito de Albacete	9 (Note: Circuito de Albacete hosted 2 rounds in 2005.)	2001–2008
10	(Portugal) **Algarve International Circuit**	9	2011–2014, 2021, 2023–present
10	(Austria) Red Bull Ring	9	2015–2016, 2019–2025
13	(United Kingdom) **Silverstone Circuit**	7	2013–2019, 2027
14	(France) Circuit de Nevers Magny-Cours	6	2006–2011
15	(Germany) **Hockenheimring**	4	2019, 2024–2026
16	(United Kingdom) Brands Hatch	3	2010–2012
16	(Germany) Nürburgring	3	2012–2014
18	(Spain) Valencia Street Circuit	2 (Note: Valencia Street Circuit hosted 2 rounds in 2008.)	2008
18	(France) Circuit de Pau-Ville	2	2019, 2022
18	(Italy) Mugello Circuit	2	2020, 2023
18	(Italy) Imola Circuit	2	2021–2022
22	(United Kingdom) Donington Park	1	2009
22	(Italy) **Misano World Circuit**	1	2026–2027

== Points system ==
Seasons	Race	1	2	3	4	5	6	7	8	9	10	11	12	13	14	15	PP	FL	PG
2001–2003	Race	20	18	16	14	12	10	9	8	7	6	5	4	3	2	1	1	2	—N/a
2004	Race	12	10	8	6	5	4	3	2	1	—N/a						1	1	—N/a
2005–2006	Race	12	10	8	6	5	4	3	2	1	—N/a							1	—N/a
2007–2008	Race 1	13	11	9	6	5	4	3	2	1	—N/a						1	—N/a	
2007–2008	Race 2	12	10	8	6	5	4	3	2	1	—N/a								
2009–2011	Race 1	14	12	10	8	6	5	3	2	1	—N/a						1	1	—N/a
2009–2011	Race 2	12	10	8	6	5	4	3	2	1	—N/a							1	—N/a
2012–2020	Race	25	18	15	12	10	8	6	4	2	1	—N/a					1	1	—N/a
2021–present	Race	25	18	15	12	10	8	6	4	2	1	—N/a					1	1	2*

== Champions ==
=== Spanish Formula Three ===
==== Drivers ====
Season	Driver	Team	Poles	Wins	Podiums	Fastest laps	Points	Clinched	Margin
2001	(Spain) Ander Vilariño	(Spain) Racing Engineering	7	6	8	7	196	Race 12 of 14	39
2002	(Spain) Marcel Costa	(Spain) E.V. Racing	2	2	9	3	190	Race 11 of 13	16
2003	(Brazil) Ricardo Maurício	(Spain) Racing Engineering	4	6	7	2	190	Race 11 of 13	6
2004	(Spain) Borja García	(Spain) Racing Engineering	8	9	10	8	149	Race 14 of 14	18
2005	(Spain) Andy Soucek	(Spain) Llusiá Racing	2	3	7	1	112	Race 13 of 13	3
2006	(Argentina) Ricardo Risatti	(Spain) TEC-Auto	3	5	7	8	118	Race 15 of 16	15
2007	(Spain) Máximo Cortés	(Spain) Escuderia TEC-Auto	4	6	7	9	117	Race 16 of 16	4
2008	(Spain) Germán Sánchez	(Spain) Campos F3 Racing	1	4	5	4	88	Race 17 of 17	4

==== Teams ====
Season	Team	Poles	Wins	Podiums	Fastest laps	Points	Clinched	Margin
2001	(Spain) Racing Engineering	8	7	13	9	113	Race 14 of 14	19
2002	(Spain) Racing Engineering	2	4	9	2	108	Race 12 of 13	19
2003	(Spain) Racing Engineering	4	6	10	3	119	Race 12 of 13	26
2004	(Spain) Racing Engineering	9	10	21	10	179	Race 10 of 14	18
2005	(Spain) Racing Engineering	2	3	7	1	252	Race 9 of 13	128
2006	(Spain) Racing Engineering	1	4	14	1	155	Race 16 of 16	9
2007	(Spain) Escuderia TEC-Auto	4	7	17	9	197	Race 16 of 16	30
2008	(Spain) Campos F3 Racing	3	4	12	7	134	Race 15 of 17	44

==== Junior Cup ====
Season	Driver	Team	Poles	Wins (Junior)	Podiums (Junior)	Fastest laps	Points (Junior)	Clinched	Margin
2001	(Spain) Juan Antonio del Pino	(Spain) Meycom	0	0	1	0	73	Race 13 of 14	23
2002	(Spain) Andy Soucek	(Spain) Racing Engineering	0	0	0	0	113	Race 7 of 13	16
2003	(Argentina) Ricardo Risatti	(Spain) EV Racing (Spain) Elide Racing	0	0 (8)	1 (10)	0	70 (96)	Race 12 of 13	28
2004	(Spain) Javier Villa	(Spain) EV Racing (Spain) Elide Racing	0	0 (10)	0 (11)	0	29 (108)	Race 13 of 14	28

==== Trofeo Ibérico ====
Season	Driver	Team	Poles	Wins (Trofeo)	Podiums(Trofeo)	Fastest laps	Points (Trofeo)	Clinched	Margin
2003	(Spain) Borja García	(Spain) GTA Motor Competición	1	1 (0)	7 (4)	2	80 (182)	Race 5 of 5	4
2004	(Spain) Borja García	(Spain) Racing Engineering	7	9 (5)	10 (5)	8	149 (63)	Race 6 of 6	13
2005	(Spain) Andy Soucek	(Spain) Llusiá Racing	2	3 (2)	7 (3)	1	112 (77)	Race 5 of 6	19
2006	(Spain) Roldán Rodríguez	(Spain) Campos Racing	2	4 (3)	5 (3)	3	103 (65)	Race 6 of 6	6

==== Copa de España de F3 ====
Season	Driver	Team	Poles	Wins (Copa)	Podiums(Copa)	Fastest laps	Points (Copa)	Clinched	Margin
2005	(Spain) Arturo Llobell	(Spain) Campos Racing	0	0	0	0	16 (86)	Race 15 of 15	4
2006	(Spain) German Sanchez	(Spain) Escuela Profiltek	0	0	0	1	19 (108)	Race 15 of 16	15
2007	(Norway) Christian Ebbesvik	(United Kingdom) Team West-Tec	0	0 (7)	0 (13)	0	7 (118)	Race 16 of 16	0
2008	(Switzerland) Natacha Gachnang	(United Kingdom) Team West-Tec	1	0 (5)	0 (12)	2	76 (110)	Race 16 of 16	1

=== European F3 Open ===
==== Drivers ====
Season	Driver	Team	Poles	Wins	Podiums	Fastest laps	Points	Clinched	Margin
2009	(Spain) Bruno Méndez	(Spain) Campos Racing	2	4	11	8	145	Race 16 of 16	2
2010	(Spain) Marco Barba	(Lebanon) Cedars Motorsport	3	6	10	8	154	Race 12 of 16	42
2011	(Switzerland) Alex Fontana	(Italy) Corbetta Competizioni	1	2	7	1	120	Race 15 of 16	5
2012	(Italy) Niccolò Schirò	(Italy) RP Motorsport	3	4	11	7	272	Race 16 of 16	5
2013	(United Arab Emirates) Ed Jones	(United Kingdom) Team West-Tec F3	4	6	10	3	256	Race 16 of 16	9

==== Teams ====
Season	Team	Poles	Wins	Podiums	Fastest laps	Points	Clinched	Margin
2009	(Spain) Campos Racing	4	6	14	10	117	Race 16 of 16	7
2010	(Lebanon) Cedars Motorsport	3	6	10	8	116	Race 15 of 16	24
2011	(United Kingdom) Team West-Tec	2	4	8	1	101	Race 16 of 16	6
2012	(Italy) RP Motorsport	8	8	23	10	138	Race 14 of 16	41
2013	(Italy) RP Motorsport	6	6	26	7	128	Race 16 of 16	2

==== Copa F306/300 ====
Season	Driver	Team	Poles	Wins (Copa)	Podiums (Copa)	Fastest laps	Points (Copa)	Clinched	Margin
2009	(United Kingdom) Callum MacLeod	(United Kingdom) Team West-Tec	0	0 (7)	1 (12)	0	41 (106)	Race 14 of 16	27
2010	(Lebanon) Noel Jammal	(Lebanon) Cedars Motorsport	0	0 (5)	0 (8)	0	24 (89)	Race 16 of 16	5
2011	(Brazil) Fabio Gamberini	(United Kingdom) Team West-Tec	0	1 (10)	3 (14)	0	79 (130)	Race 14 of 16	12
2012	(Italy) Kevin Giovesi	(Italy) DAV Racing	0	0 (10)	1 (11)	0	93 (110)	Race 13 of 16	38
2013	(Slovakia) Richard Gonda	(United Kingdom) Drivex School	0	0 (7)	0 (10)	0	10 (100)	Race 15 of 16	19

=== Euroformula Open ===
==== Drivers ====
Season	Driver	Team	Poles	Wins	Podiums	Fastest laps	Points	Clinched	Margin
2014	(Thailand) Sandy Stuvik	(Italy) RP Motorsport	10	11	12	5	332	Race 14 of 16	89
2015	(Brazil) Vitor Baptista	(Italy) RP Motorsport	5	6	12	7	291	Race 16 of 16	5
2016	(Italy) Leonardo Pulcini	(Spain) Campos Racing	3	7	15	8	303	Race 12 of 16	56
2017	(United Kingdom) Harrison Scott	(Italy) RP Motorsport	11	12	13	9	340	Race 12 of 16	118
2018	(Brazil) Felipe Drugovich	(Italy) RP Motorsport	10	14	16	10	405	Race 12 of 16	159
2019	(Japan) Marino Sato	(Germany) Team Motopark	6	9	11	5	309	Race 15 of 18	130
2020	(China) Yifei Ye	(Japan) CryptoTower Racing	12	11	16	12	369	Race 16 of 18	121
2021	(United States) Cameron Das	(Germany) Team Motopark	1	7	16	6	382	Race 22 of 24	67
2022	(Denmark) Oliver Goethe	(Germany) Team Motopark	7	11	18	12	473	Race 24 of 26	57
2023	(Mexico) Noel León	(Germany) Team Motopark	5	7	15	11	394	Race 20 of 23	87
2024	(United States) Brad Benavides	(Germany) Team Motopark	4	9	19	10	431	Race 21 of 24	86
2025	(Poland) Tymek Kucharczyk	(Italy) BVM Racing	5	6	14	9	362	Race 23 of 24	17

==== Teams ====
Season	Team	Poles	Wins	Podiums	Fastest laps	Points	Clinched	Margin
2014	(Italy) RP Motorsport	13	13	22	10	152	Race 14 of 16	51
2015	(Italy) RP Motorsport	5	7	13	8	121	Race 15 of 16	10
2016	(Spain) Campos Racing	3	7	17	9	120	Race 14 of 16	18
2017	(Italy) RP Motorsport	12	13	17	10	134	Race 12 of 16	44
2018	(Italy) RP Motorsport	10	14	16	11	180	Race 11 of 16	78
2019	(Germany) Team Motopark	11	15	33	11	262	Race 12 of 18	168
2020	(Japan) CryptoTower Racing	17	16	26	16	244	Race 12 of 18	129
2021	(Germany) Team Motopark	5	16	29	18	277	Race 23 of 24	69
2022	(Japan) CryptoTower Racing	3	12	41	8	358	Race 23 of 24	78
2023	(Germany) Team Motopark	5	15	36	15	325	Race 15 of 23	124
2024	(Germany) Team Motopark	6	19	46	19	402	Race 12 of 24	279
2025	(Germany) Team Motopark	3	16	46	12	309	Race 21 of 24	82

==== Rookies ====
Season	Driver	Team	Poles	Wins (rookie)	Podiums (rookie)	Fastest laps	Points (rookie)	Clinched	Margin
2016	(Austria) Ferdinand Habsburg	(Spain) Drivex School	4	2 (10)	12 (15)	1	247 (140)	Race 12 of 16	42
2017	(Russia) Nikita Troitskiy	(Spain) Drivex School	2	0 (7)	9 (14)	4	222 (124)	Race 14 of 16	29
2018	(Netherlands) Bent Viscaal	(Spain) Teo Martín Motorsport	4	1 (14)	12 (15)	2	246 (138)	Race 12 of 16	48
2019	(New Zealand) Liam Lawson	(Germany) Team Motopark	2	4 (6)	7 (9)	1	179 (92)	Race 18 of 18	9
2020	(Germany) Niklas Krütten	(Germany) Team Motopark	0	0 (9)	5 (13)	0	153 (140)	Race 16 of 18	28
2021	(United Kingdom) Casper Stevenson	(Netherlands) Van Amersfoort Racing	0	2 (6)	4 (20)	0	217 (178)	Race 19 of 24	35
2022	(Russia) Vladislav Lomko	(Japan) CryptoTower Racing	2	6 (21)	19 (25)	5	416 (226)	Race 22 of 26	64
2023	(Germany) Jakob Bergmeister	(Germany) Team Motopark	0	0 (10)	3 (16)	0	150 (148)	Race 12 of 23	40
2024	(Brazil) Fernando Barrichello	(Germany) Team Motopark	0	1 (20)	5 (24)	1	264 (210)	Race 13 of 24	176
2025	(Sri Lanka) Yevan David	(Germany) Team Motopark	3	6 (18)	14 (22)	2	345 (215)	Race 23 of 24	31

==== Spanish F3 Drivers ====
Season	Driver	Team	Poles	Wins	Podiums	Fastest laps	Points	Clinched	Margin
2014	(Thailand) Sandy Stuvik	(Italy) RP Motorsport	4	4	4	2	118	Race 5 of 6	13
2015	(Russia) Konstantin Tereshchenko	(Spain) Campos Racing	5	4	5	3	134	Race 5 of 6	37
2016	(Italy) Leonardo Pulcini	(Spain) Campos Racing	1	2	4	3	105	Race 6 of 6	11
2017	(Canada) Devlin DeFrancesco	(United Kingdom) Carlin Motorsport	0	1	3	0	119	Race 5 of 6	22
2018	(Brazil) Felipe Drugovich	(Italy) RP Motorsport	0	1	3	0	157	Race 5 of 6	53

==== Spanish F3 Teams ====
Season	Team	Poles	Wins	Podiums	Fastest laps	Points	Clinched	Margin
2014	(Italy) RP Motorsport	5	5	8	4	56	Race 5 of 6	14
2015	(Spain) Campos Racing	5	4	6	3	48	Race 6 of 6	9
2016	(Spain) Campos Racing	1	2	5	3	42	Race 6 of 6	5
2017	(Italy) RP Motorsport	4	5	6	4	50	Race 5 of 6	7
2018	(Italy) RP Motorsport	3	5	6	3	72	Race 4 of 6	28
