= Edoardo Liberati =

Italian racing driver

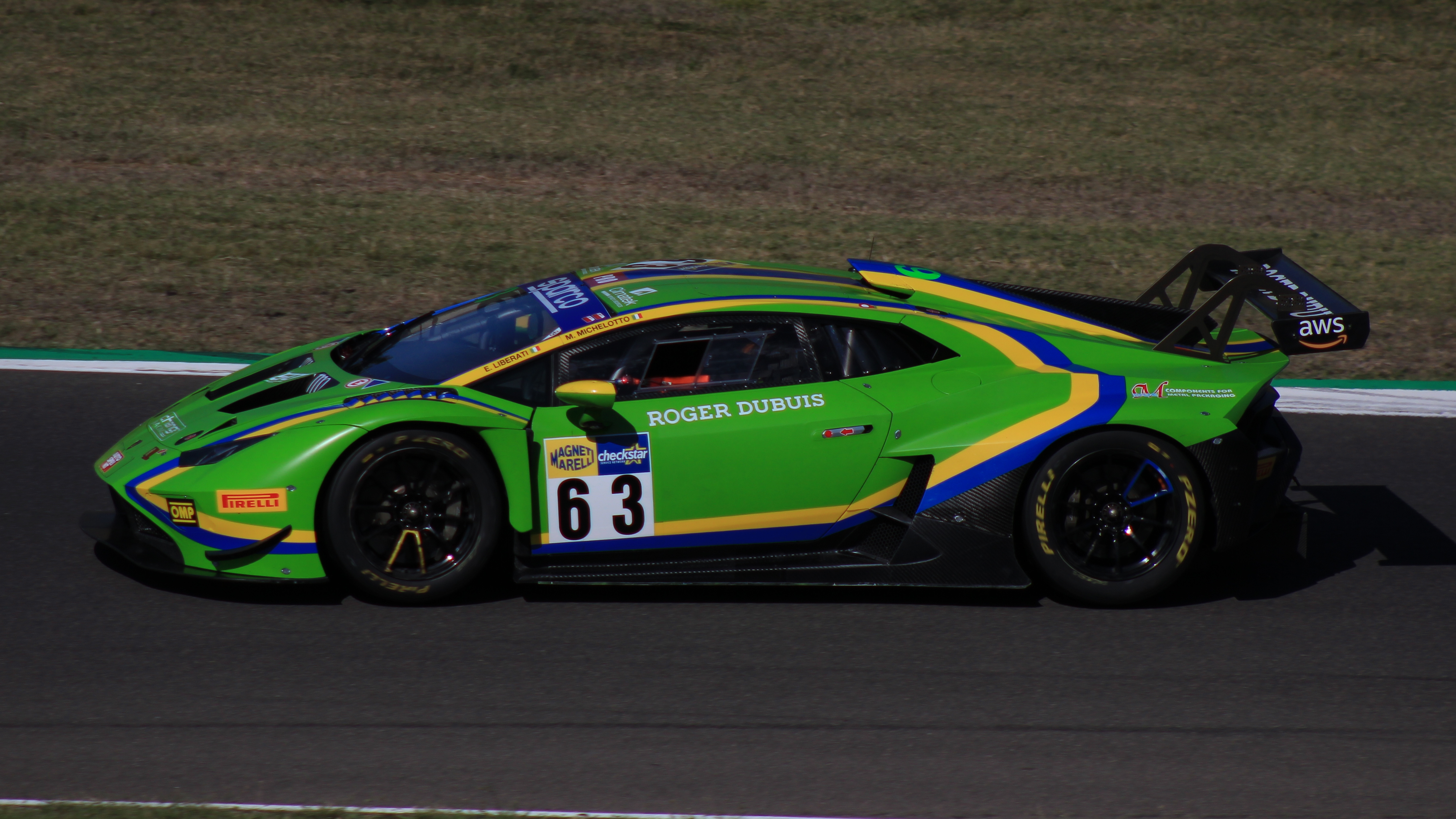
- Liberati's Lamborghini Huracán GT3 Evo 2 at Mugello Circuit during the 2023 Italian GT Championship
- Nationality: (Italy) Italian
- Born: 18 December 1992 (age 33) Rome, Italy

Italian Formula Three career
- Debut season: 2009
- Current team: Arco Motorsport
- Categorisation: FIA Gold (until 2015, 2024–); FIA Silver (2016–2023)
- Car number: 9
- Former teams: BVM–Target Racing; Lucidi Motors; Prema Junior
- Starts: 37
- Wins: 2
- Poles: 3
- Fastest laps: 2
- Best finish: 9th in 2010

Previous series
- 2008: Formula Azzurra

Championship titles
- 2008: Formula Azzurra

Edoardo Liberati (born 18 December 1992) is an Italian professional racing driver.

== Career ==
=== Karting ===
Liberati began karting in 2006 in the Italian 100 Junior Championship, finishing as runner–up in the series the following year. In the same year, he also finished second in the Lazio Regional Championship.

=== Formula Azzurra ===
Liberati began his single-seater career in 2008 by participating in the Formula Azzurra series in his native Italy. During the season he took victories at Magione and Misano along with five further podiums to win the title by 12 points from Greek driver Stefanos Kamitsakis.

=== Italian Formula Three ===
The following season, Liberati moved up to the Italian Formula Three Championship, joining the BVM–Target Racing team alongside Formula Renault graduate Daniel Zampieri. He contested the first four rounds of the season before moving to rival outfit Lucidi Motors to replace fellow Italian Marco Zipoli, who in turn took Liberati's seat at BVM–Target. He finished in the points on five occasions to be classified 13th in the standings. He also finished fourth in the rookie classification.

Liberati continued in the series in 2010, switching teams to join Andrea Caldarelli and Samuele Buttarelli at the Prema Junior squad. He finished 9th in the standings after securing two podium places at Vallelunga and Monza. He finished level on points with the EuroInternational entry of Gabriel Chaves, but was classified ahead of him on countback.

Liberati continued to compete in the series for a third season in 2011, joining Team Ghinzani.

== Racing record ==
=== Career summary ===
Season	Series	Team	Races	Wins	Poles	F/Laps	Podiums	Points	Position
2008	Formula Azzurra	MG Motorsport	14	2	3	3	7	76	**1st**
2009	Italian Formula 3 Championship	BVM - Target Racing	8	0	0	0	0	13	13th
2009	Italian Formula 3 Championship	Lucidi Motors	7	0	0	0	0	13	13th
2010	Italian Formula 3 Championship	Prema Junior	16	0	0	1	2	44	9th
2011	Italian Formula 3 Championship	Arco Motorsport	16	2	3	1	3	115	5th
2012	Italian GT Championship - GT3	ROAL Motorsport	14	1	0	1	3	99	10th
2012	Blancpain Endurance Series - Pro-Am	ROAL Motorsport	1	0	0	0	0	0	NC
2013	Porsche Carrera Cup Italia	Erre Esse Motorsport	14	0	0	0	6	105	4th
2013	Blancpain Endurance Series - Pro-Am	ROAL Motorsport	1	0	0	0	0	0	NC
2014	Porsche Carrera Cup Italia	Ebimotors	14	1	0	1	8	126	4th
2015	Lamborghini Super Trofeo Europe - Pro	Ratón Racing	10	0	0	0	3	60	8th
2015	Lamborghini Super Trofeo Asia - Pro-Am		6	4	0	0	5	?	?
2016	Porsche Carrera Cup Italia	Ghinzani Arco Motorsport	4	0	0	0	1	40	16th
2016	Italian GT Championship - Super GT Cup	Antonelli Motorsport	2	1	0	0	2	22	17th
2016	GT Asia Series - GT3	FFF Racing Team by ACM	12	1	2	0	7	144	**1st**
2017	Lamborghini Super Trofeo Europe - Pro	VS Racing	2	0	0	0	1	?	?
2017	Lamborghini Super Trofeo World Final - Pro	VS Racing	2	0	0	0	0	?	?
2017	Lamborghini Super Trofeo Asia - Pro	Emperor Racing	6	0	0	1	2	41	8th
2017	International GT Open	Ratón Racing	12	0	0	0	0	13	16th
2018	Lamborghini Super Trofeo Europe - Pro-Am	VS Racing	10	0	5	4	1	54	6th
2018	Lamborghini Super Trofeo World Final - Pro-Am	VS Racing	2	0	1	0	0	4	12th
2018	International GT Open	Vincenzo Sospiri Racing	6	0	0	0	1	21	16th
2018	Blancpain GT Series Asia - GT3	KCMG	12	0	1	0	3	96	6th
2019	Lamborghini Super Trofeo Asia - Pro-Am	Vincenzo Sospiri Racing	2	1	0	2	2	28	8th
2019	GT Cup Open Europe	Vincenzo Sospiri Racing	9	5	6	?	6	87	**3rd**
2019	Blancpain GT Series Endurance Cup	KCMG	1	0	0	0	0	0	NC
2019	Intercontinental GT Challenge	KCMG	5	0	0	0	0	18	23rd
2019	24H GT Series - A6	KCMG							
2019	24 Hours of Nürburgring - SP9	KCMG	1	0	0	0	0	N/A	DNF
2020	Lamborghini Super Trofeo Europe - Pro	VS Racing	2	0	0	1	0	?	?
2020	GT World Challenge Europe Endurance Cup	KCMG	2	0	0	0	0	4	27th
2020	24 Hours of Nürburgring - SP9	KCMG	1	0	0	0	0	N/A	DNF
2021	GT World Challenge Europe Endurance Cup	KCMG	1	0	0	0	0	0	NC
2021	24 Hours of Nürburgring - SP9	KCMG	1	0	0	0	0	N/A	23rd
2022	Italian GT Endurance Championship - GT3 Pro	Vincenzo Sospiri Racing	4	2	2	1	3	55	**1st**
2022	Lamborghini Super Trofeo Europe - Pro-Am	Brutal Fish Racing Team	4	0	1	0	2	?	?
2022	Lamborghini Super Trofeo North America - Pro	Dream Racing Motorsport	12	0	?	?	5	99	4th
2023	GT World Challenge Asia - GT3	KCMG	8	0	0	0	0	12	34th
2023	Super Taikyu - ST-X	KCMG	1	0	0	0	1	85‡	6th‡
2023	24 Hours of Nürburgring - SP10	KCMG	1	0	0	0	1	N/A	**2nd**
2023	Italian GT Championship - GT3	Vincenzo Sospiri Racing							
2023	Lamborghini Super Trofeo Europe - Pro-Am	Brutal Fish Racing Team							
2024	GT World Challenge Asia	Vincenzo Sospiri Racing	12	1	0	?	3	80	6th
2024	Italian GT Endurance Championship - GT3	Vincenzo Sospiri Racing	4	0	1	1	3	62	**2nd**
2025	GT World Challenge Europe Endurance Cup	Nordique Racing	5	0	0	0	0	0	NC
2025	Nürburgring Langstrecken-Serie - SP8T	KCMG							
2025	Italian GT Championship Sprint Cup - GT3	VSR	6	2	1	4	4	84	**3rd**
2026	Nürburgring Langstrecken-Serie - SP9	KCMG							
2026	Italian GT Championship Endurance Cup - GT3	VSR	4	1	0	0	1	58	**2nd**

^{‡} Team standings
* Season still in progress.

=== Complete GT World Challenge Europe results ===
==== GT World Challenge Europe Endurance Cup ====
(key) (Races in bold indicate pole position; races in italics indicate fastest lap)

Year	Team	Car	Class	1	2	3	4	5	6	7	8	Pos.	Points
2012	ROAL Motorsport	BMW Z4 GT3	Pro-Am	MNZ	SIL	LEC	SPA; 6H; 28	SPA; 12H; 21	SPA; 24H; Ret	NÜR	NAV	NC	0
2013	ROAL Motorsport	BMW Z4 GT3	Pro-Am	MNZ; Ret	SIL	LEC	SPA; 6H	SPA; 12H	SPA; 24H	NÜR		NC	0
2019	KCMG	Nissan GT-R Nismo GT3	Pro	MNZ	SIL	LEC	SPA; 6H; 27	SPA; 12H; 26	SPA; 24H; 18	CAT		NC	0
2020	KCMG	Porsche 911 GT3 R	Pro	IMO	NÜR; 9	SPA; 6H; 52	SPA; 12H; 47	SPA; 24H; Ret	LEC			27th	4
2021	KCMG	Porsche 911 GT3 R	Pro	MNZ	LEC	SPA; 6H; 13	SPA; 12H; 12	SPA; 24H; 12	NÜR	CAT		NC	0
2025	Nordique Racing	Mercedes-AMG GT3 Evo	Pro	LEC; 51					NÜR; 52†	CAT; 30		NC	0
2025	Nordique Racing	Mercedes-AMG GT3 Evo	Gold		MNZ; 33	SPA; 6H; 47	SPA; 12H; 35	SPA; 24H; 37				14th	18

Sporting positions
Preceded by Salvatore Cicatelli	Formula Azzurra; Champion; 2008	Succeeded by Alberto Cerqui
