= 2008 Italian Formula Three Championship =

Seasons
- ← 2007 2009 →

The 2008 Italian Formula Three Championship was the 44th Italian Formula Three Championship season. It began on May 10 at Mugello and ended on October 19 at Vallelunga after 16 races.

The season began with Edoardo Piscopo dominating the field with four successive wins, but another run of seven victories by Mirko Bortolotti, gave him the leadership in the championship. The championship title was delayed to the last round in Vallelunga, the victory in race one and his eighth of the season gave Bortolotti the championship crown.

The three first classified drivers of the championship were rewarded with a Formula One test organized by the Scuderia Ferrari at the wheel of a Ferrari F2008 at Fiorano, with Bortolotti setting the new track record.

== Teams and drivers ==
- All cars were powered by FPT engines, all teams were Italian-registered.

Team	No	Driver	Chassis	Rounds
Campionato Nazionale
Lucidi Motors	1	(Italy) Giovanni Nava	Dallara F308	All
Lucidi Motors	4	(Italy) Francesco Castellacci	Dallara F308	All
Lucidi Motors	12	(Italy) Mirko Bortolotti	Dallara F308	All
Minardi by Corbetta Competizioni	2	(Italy) Marco Zipoli	Dallara F308	All
Minardi by Corbetta Competizioni	3	(Italy) Michael Dalle Stelle	Dallara F308	All
Minardi by Corbetta Competizioni	5	(Italy) Valentino Sebastiani	Dallara F308	1
Minardi by Corbetta Competizioni	5	(Italy) Nicolò Piancastelli	Dallara F308	2–8
Europa Corse	6	(Italy) Salvatore Gatto	Dallara F308	1–3
Europa Corse	7	(Italy) Francesco Prandi	Dallara F308	All
Europa Corse	8	(Italy) Federico Glorioso	Dallara F308	4
Europa Corse	14	(Italy) Giulio Glorioso	Dallara F308	2–4, 6
Europa Corse	18	(France) Tom Dillmann	Dallara F308	6–8
BVM – Target Racing	9	(Greece) Stamatis Katsimis	Dallara F308	1–2
BVM – Target Racing	9	(Argentina) Facundo Crovo	Dallara F308	3–4
BVM – Target Racing	9	(Italy) Giacomo Ricci	Dallara F308	7
BVM – Target Racing	9	(Italy) Daniel Mancinelli	Dallara F308	8
BVM – Target Racing	39	(Italy) Salvatore Cicatelli	Dallara F308	All
Team Ghinzani	11	(Italy) Alessandro Cicognani	Dallara F308	All
Team Ghinzani	16	(Italy) Edoardo Piscopo	Dallara F308	All
Team Ghinzani	41	(Italy) Angelo Fabrizio Comi	Dallara F308	8
RP Motorsport	21	(Belgium) Nico Verdonck	Dallara F308	1–4
RP Motorsport	53	(South Africa) Jimmy Auby	Dallara F308	4
Trofeo Nazionale CSAI
Europa Corse	19	(Italy) Matteo Davenia	Dallara F304	8
Europa Corse	52	(Italy) Ivan Tramontozzi	Dallara F304	1–2
Europa Corse	53	(Lebanon) Khalil Beschir	Dallara F304	8
Team Ghinzani	51	(Italy) Angelo Fabrizio Comi	Dallara F304	1–7

== Calendar ==
All rounds were held in Italy.

Round		Circuit	Date	Pole position	Fastest lap	Winning driver	Winning team
1	R1	Mugello Circuit	10 May	(Italy) Edoardo Piscopo	(Italy) Edoardo Piscopo	(Italy) Edoardo Piscopo	Team Ghinzani
1	R2	Mugello Circuit	11 May	(Italy) Edoardo Piscopo	(Italy) Edoardo Piscopo	(Italy) Edoardo Piscopo	Team Ghinzani
2	R1	Autodromo dell'Umbria, Magione	7 June	(Italy) Edoardo Piscopo	(Italy) Edoardo Piscopo	(Italy) Edoardo Piscopo	Team Ghinzani
2	R2	Autodromo dell'Umbria, Magione	8 June	(Italy) Edoardo Piscopo	(Italy) Edoardo Piscopo	(Italy) Edoardo Piscopo	Team Ghinzani
3	R1	Autodromo Nazionale Monza	7 July	(Italy) Francesco Castellacci	(Italy) Giovanni Nava	(Italy) Mirko Bortolotti	Team Ghinzani
3	R2	Autodromo Nazionale Monza	7 July	(Italy) Francesco Castellacci	(Belgium) Nico Verdonck	(Italy) Mirko Bortolotti	Lucidi Motors
4	R1	Mugello Circuit	20 July	(Italy) Mirko Bortolotti	(Italy) Mirko Bortolotti	(Italy) Mirko Bortolotti	Lucidi Motors
4	R2	Mugello Circuit	20 July	(Italy) Mirko Bortolotti	(Italy) Edoardo Piscopo	(Italy) Mirko Bortolotti	Lucidi Motors
5	R1	Autodromo Riccardo Paletti, Varano	31 August	(Italy) Mirko Bortolotti	(Italy) Salvatore Cicatelli	(Italy) Mirko Bortolotti	Lucidi Motors
5	R2	Autodromo Riccardo Paletti, Varano	1 September	(Italy) Mirko Bortolotti	(Italy) Mirko Bortolotti	(Italy) Mirko Bortolotti	Team Ghinzani
6	R1	Misano World Circuit	13 September	(Italy) Edoardo Piscopo	(Italy) Mirko Bortolotti	(Italy) Mirko Bortolotti	Lucidi Motors
6	R2	Misano World Circuit	14 September	(Italy) Edoardo Piscopo	(France) Tom Dillmann	(Italy) Edoardo Piscopo	Team Ghinzani
7	R1	Adria International Raceway	27 September	(Italy) Edoardo Piscopo	(Italy) Edoardo Piscopo	(Italy) Edoardo Piscopo	Lucidi Motors
7	R2	Adria International Raceway	28 September	(Italy) Edoardo Piscopo	(Italy) Edoardo Piscopo	(Italy) Edoardo Piscopo	Team Ghinzani
8	R1	ACI Vallelunga Circuit	18 October	(Italy) Mirko Bortolotti	(Italy) Mirko Bortolotti	(Italy) Mirko Bortolotti	Lucidi Motors
8	R2	ACI Vallelunga Circuit	19 October	(Italy) Mirko Bortolotti	(Italy) Mirko Bortolotti	(Italy) Mirko Bortolotti	Lucidi Motors

== Standings ==
- Points are awarded as follows:

1	2	3	4	5	6	7	8	PP	FL
10	8	6	5	4	3	2	1	**1**	1

Pos	Driver	MUG		MAG		MON		MUG		VAR		MIS		ADR		VLL		Pts
1	(Italy) Mirko Bortolotti	2	6	2	2	1	1	**1**	**1**	**1**	**1**	1	3	2	2	**1**	**1**	150
2	(Italy) Edoardo Piscopo	**1**	**1**	**1**	**1**	2	Ret	8	2	Ret	2	**2**	**1**	**1**	**1**	5	4	127
3	(Italy) Salvatore Cicatelli	8	7	6	4	3	7	2	7	3	3	5	5	12	5	4	7	61
4	(Italy) Francesco Castellacci	14	3	3	Ret	**Ret**	**2**	4	3	5	Ret	3	11	6	6	11	2	57
5	(Italy) Giovanni Nava	4	4	Ret	3	8	6	3	4	7	6	8	4	9	10	3	5	53
6	(Italy) Marco Zipoli	6	12	5	12	4	5	7	8	2	5	4	6	5	4	9	6	51
7	(France) Tom Dillmann											DSQ	2	3	3	2	Ret	29
8	(Belgium) Nico Verdonck	3	2	8	6	Ret	10	5	6									26
9	(Italy) Michael Dalle Stelle	Ret	10	7	Ret	7	8	16	13	4	4	Ret	7	7	7	7	11	23
10	(Italy) Salvatore Gatto	5	5	4	Ret	6	4											21
11	(Italy) Alessandro Cicognani	10	11	Ret	11	Ret	9	6	5	6	7	Ret	8	Ret	12	Ret	Ret	13
12	(Argentina) Facundo Crovo					5	3	9	9									10
13	(Italy) Daniel Mancinelli															6	3	9
14	(Greece) Stamatis Katsimis	7	8	Ret	5													7
15	(Italy) Giulio Glorioso			10	7	11	11	12	Ret			6	9					5
16	(Italy) Giacomo Ricci													4	Ret			5
17	(Italy) Francesco Prandi	11	Ret	11	9	Ret	12	13	12	8	8	Ret	10	8	8	8	Ret	5
18	(Italy) Nicolò Piancastelli			13	8	10	13	14	11	9	Ret	7	13	11	9	12	9	3
19	(Italy) Angelo Fabrizio Comi	12	13	12	10	9	14	15	Ret	Ret	9	Ret	12	10	11	10	8	1
20	(Italy) Valentino Sebastiani	9	9															0
21	(Italy) Ivan Tramontozzi	13	14	9	Ret													0
22	(Italy) Federico Glorioso							10	10									0
23	(Italy) Matteo Davenia															13	10	0
24	(South Africa) Jimmy Auby							11	Ret									0
	(Lebanon) Khalil Beschir															Ret	DNS	0
Pos	Driver	MUG		MAG		MON		MUG		VAR		MIS		ADR		VLL		Pts

Colour	Result
Gold	Winner
Silver	Second place
Bronze	Third place
Green	Points classification
Blue	Non-points classification
Blue	Non-classified finish (NC)
Purple	Retired, not classified (Ret)
Red	Did not qualify (DNQ)
Red	Did not pre-qualify (DNPQ)
Black	Disqualified (DSQ)
White	Did not start (DNS)
White	Withdrew (WD)
White	Race cancelled (C)
Blank	Did not practice (DNP)
Blank	Did not arrive (DNA)
Blank	Excluded (EX)

**Bold** – Pole
Italics – Fastest Lap
