= Salvatore Cicatelli =

Italian racing driver

- Nationality: (Italy) Italian
- Born: 21 May 1990 (age 36) Naples (Italy)

Previous series
- 2008–09 2007 2007: Italian Formula Three; Italian Formula Renault 2.0; Formula Azzurra

Championship titles
- 2007: Formula Azzurra

Salvatore Cicatelli (born 21 May 1990 in Naples) is a professional racing driver from Italy.

== Career ==
=== Formula Azzurra ===
After completing a karting career that spanned six years, Cicatelli stepped up to single–seaters in 2007, racing in the Italian Formula Azzurra championship. After a season–long battle with fellow Italian driver Marco Zipoli, Cicatelli won the title by a single point, winning half of the season's fourteen races and taking a further four podium places in the process.

=== Formula Renault 2.0 ===
At the end of 2007, Cicatelli made his Formula Renault debut, racing in the season–ending Italian Formula Renault 2.0 Winter series held at Vallelunga. Driving for Viola Formula Racing, he finished seventh in the standings with 44 points.

=== Formula Three ===
The following season, Cicatelli graduated to the prestigious Italian Formula Three Championship, racing for BVM–Target Racing. In a championship dominated by Mirko Bortolotti and Edoardo Piscopo, he finished every race of the season and took four podium places to finish third in the standings. This result was enough for him to earn a test in a Ferrari F2008 Formula One car alongside Bortolotti and Piscopo, which took place at Fiorano on 27 November 2008. He completed a total of 33 laps at the test, recording a best lap time of 1:01.243, and was the slowest of the three drivers.

Cicatelli stayed in the championship for the 2009 season, joining the Corbetta Competizioni team. This relationship lasted for only six races, however, before he left the outfit to join Team Ghinzani. Despite the switch of teams, he finished the season in seventh place, taking podium positions at Misano, Varano and Imola.

== Racing record ==
=== Career summary ===
Season	Series	Team	Races	Wins	Poles	F/Laps	Podiums	Points	Position
2007	Formula Azzurra	PKF Racing	14	7	8	5	11	110	1st
2007	Italian Formula Renault 2.0 - Winter series	Viola Formula Racing	4	0	0	0	0	44	7th
2008	Italian Formula Three Championship	BVM–Target Racing	16	0	0	1	4	61	3rd
2009	Italian Formula Three Championship	Corbetta Competizioni	14	0	0	0	3	67	7th
2009	Italian Formula Three Championship	Team Ghinzani	14	0	0	0	3	67	7th

Sporting positions
Preceded by Giuseppe Termine	Formula Azzurra; Champion; 2007	Succeeded by Edoardo Liberati
