= 2009 Italian Formula Three Championship =

Seasons
- ← 2008 2010 →

The 2009 Italian Formula Three Championship was the 45th Italian Formula Three Championship season. It began on May 9, 2009 in Adria and ended on October 18 in Monza. Italian driver Daniel Zampieri won the title at the last round in Monza. Zampieri also sealed the Rookie Cup title during the same race.

== Teams and drivers ==
- All cars were powered by FPT engines, all teams were Italian-registered.

Team	No	Driver	Chassis	Status	Rounds
Campionato Nazionale
Lucidi Motors	1	(Italy) Giovanni Nava	Dallara F309		1–3
Lucidi Motors	1	(Italy) Marco Zipoli	Dallara F309		4
Lucidi Motors	1	(Italy) Edoardo Liberati	Dallara F309	R	5–8
Lucidi Motors	2	(Italy) Francesco Prandi	Dallara F309		All
Lucidi Motors	3	(Italy) Sergio Campana	Dallara F309	R	All
Prema Powerteam	4	(Italy) Francesco Castellacci	Dallara F309		All
Prema Powerteam	5	(Spain) Daniel Campos-Hull	Dallara F309		All
Team Ghinzani	7	(Italy) Alessandro Cicognani	Dallara F309		All
Team Ghinzani	18	(Italy) Marco Zipoli	Dallara F309		1–3
Team Ghinzani	18	(Italy) Salvatore Cicatelli	Dallara F309		4–8
Corbetta Competizioni	8	(Italy) Riccardo Cinti	Dallara F309	R	2–8
Corbetta Competizioni	27	(Italy) Michele Faccin	Dallara F309	R	1
Corbetta Competizioni	39	(Italy) Salvatore Cicatelli	Dallara F309		1–3
Corbetta Competizioni	50	(Canada) Gianmarco Raimondo	Dallara F309	R	7
Corbetta Competizioni	50	(Italy) Michael Dalle Stelle	Dallara F309		8
BVM – Target Racing	9	(Italy) Edoardo Liberati	Dallara F309		1–4
BVM – Target Racing	9	(Italy) Marco Zipoli	Dallara F309		5–8
BVM – Target Racing	23	(Italy) Nicolò Piancastelli	Dallara F309		6–7
BVM – Target Racing	44	(Italy) Daniel Zampieri	Dallara F309	R	All
Gloria Pro Team	11	(Italy) Giulio Glorioso	Dallara F309		All
Gloria Pro Team	12	(Italy) Federico Glorioso	Dallara F309		1–7
RC Motorsport	14	(Greece) Stefanos Kamitsakis	Dallara F309	R	1–5
RC Motorsport	14	(Italy) Samuele Buttarelli	Dallara F309		6
RC Motorsport	24	(Monaco) Stéphane Richelmi	Dallara F309		3–8
RP Motorsport	15	(Italy) Kevin Ceccon	Dallara F309	R	1, 4–5
RP Motorsport	16	(Italy) David Fumanelli	Dallara F309		3, 6
Europa Corse	21	(Italy) Michael Dalle Stelle	Dallara F309		1
Alan Racing Team	51	(Italy) Angelo Fabrizio Comi	Mygale M-09		All
Alan Racing Team	52	(Mexico) Pablo Sánchez López	Mygale M-09		All
Trofeo Nazionale CSAI
RP Motorsport	72	(Venezuela) Biagio Bulnes	Dallara F305		4–6

Icon	Status
R	Rookie

== Calendar ==
All rounds were held in Italy.

Round		Circuit	Date	Pole position	Fastest lap	Winning driver	Winning team
1	R1	Adria International Raceway	9 May	(Italy) Daniel Zampieri	(Spain) Daniel Campos-Hull	(Italy) Daniel Zampieri	(Italy) BVM – Target Racing
1	R2	Adria International Raceway	10 May		(Spain) Daniel Campos-Hull	(Greece) Stefanos Kamitsakis	(Italy) RC Motorsport
2	R1	Autodromo dell'Umbria, Magione	7 June	(Italy) Daniel Zampieri	(Italy) Daniel Zampieri	(Spain) Daniel Campos-Hull	(Italy) Prema Powerteam
2	R2	Autodromo dell'Umbria, Magione	7 June		(Italy) Daniel Zampieri	(Italy) Daniel Zampieri	(Italy) BVM – Target Racing
3	R1	Mugello Circuit	20 June	(Italy) Sergio Campana	(Italy) Sergio Campana	(Italy) Daniel Zampieri	(Italy) BVM – Target Racing
3	R2	Mugello Circuit	21 June		(Italy) Sergio Campana	(Italy) Sergio Campana	(Italy) Lucidi Motors
4	R1	Misano World Circuit	18 July	(Spain) Daniel Campos-Hull	(Italy) Sergio Campana	(Italy) Sergio Campana	(Italy) Lucidi Motors
4	R2	Misano World Circuit	19 July		(Mexico) Pablo Sánchez López	(Mexico) Pablo Sánchez López	(Italy) Alan Racing Team
5	R1	Autodromo Riccardo Paletti, Varano	2 August	(Italy) Daniel Zampieri	(Italy) Daniel Zampieri	(Italy) Daniel Zampieri	(Italy) BVM – Target Racing
5	R2	Autodromo Riccardo Paletti, Varano	2 August		(Spain) Daniel Campos-Hull	(Italy) Marco Zipoli	(Italy) BVM – Target Racing
6	R1	Autodromo Enzo e Dino Ferrari, Imola	6 September	(Spain) Daniel Campos-Hull	(Mexico) Pablo Sánchez López	(Mexico) Pablo Sánchez López	(Italy) Alan Racing Team
6	R2	Autodromo Enzo e Dino Ferrari, Imola	6 September		(Italy) Marco Zipoli	(Italy) Marco Zipoli	(Italy) BVM – Target Racing
7	R1	ACI Vallelunga Circuit	20 September	(Italy) Daniel Zampieri	(Italy) Sergio Campana	(Italy) Sergio Campana	(Italy) Lucidi Motors
7	R2	ACI Vallelunga Circuit	20 September		(Spain) Daniel Campos-Hull	(Spain) Daniel Campos-Hull	(Italy) Prema Powerteam
8	R1	Autodromo Nazionale Monza	17 October	(Italy) Daniel Zampieri	(Italy) Marco Zipoli	(Mexico) Pablo Sánchez López	(Italy) Alan Racing Team
8	R2	Autodromo Nazionale Monza	18 October		(Spain) Daniel Campos-Hull	(Mexico) Pablo Sánchez López	(Italy) Alan Racing Team

== Standings ==
- Points are awarded as follows:

	1	2	3	4	5	6	7	8	9	10	PP	FL
Race 1	200	150	120	100	80	60	40	30	20	10	**1**	1
Race 2	130	110	90	80	60	50	40	30	20	10		1

Pos	Driver	ADR		MAG		MUG		MIS		VAR		IMO		VLL		MZA		Pts
1	(Italy) Daniel Zampieri	**1**	5	**6**	1	1	3	2	11	**1**	Ret	7	4	**2**	3	**3**	4	1730
2	(Italy) Marco Zipoli	4	2	5	3	2	4	5	2	6	1	6	1	3	6	2	5	1580
3	(Mexico) Pablo Sánchez López	5	3	3	Ret	3	2	6	1	7	5	1	2	9	5	1	1	1550
4	(Italy) Sergio Campana	3	4	2	2	**5**	1	1	Ret	Ret	8	5	16	1	4	4	2	1520
5	(Spain) Daniel Campos-Hull	2	6	1	6	4	5	**Ret**	6	2	4	**2**	6	4	1	Ret	3	1480
6	(Monaco) Stéphane Richelmi					7	Ret	4	5	4	2	4	3	5	2	5	6	920
7	(Italy) Salvatore Cicatelli	Ret	17	9	5	DNS	DNS	7	3	3	Ret	3	5	6	Ret	6	7	670
8	(Italy) Francesco Castellacci	7	8	4	4	6	6	3	4	8	10	13	12	7	15	12	Ret	640
9	(Italy) Riccardo Cinti			8	7	13	Ret	9	8	5	3	8	7	Ret	7	9	Ret	420
10	(Greece) Stefanos Kamitsakis	6	1	7	Ret	Ret	Ret	Ret	12	DNS	DNS							230
11	(Italy) Francesco Prandi	15	11	10	8	9	7	8	Ret	9	Ret	14	13	10	13	8	8	220
12	(Italy) Alessandro Cicognani	12	10	14	Ret	11	13	10	7	10	6	12	9	8	8	Ret	12	200
13	(Italy) Edoardo Liberati	11	13	13	11	8	10	13	16	13	7	9	8	Ret	11	Ret	DNS	130
14	(Italy) Kevin Ceccon	8	7					11	9	12	9							110
15	(Italy) Giovanni Nava	9	9	11	10	10	8											90
16	(Italy) Giulio Glorioso	Ret	15	Ret	13	12	11	14	15	14	11	16	15	15	9	7	9	80
17	(Italy) Angelo Fabrizio Comi	13	12	12	9	16	14	12	10	11	14	10	Ret	13	Ret	10	10	60
18	(Italy) Federico Glorioso	16	14	15	12	14	9	15	14	Ret	12	15	10	12	14			30
19	(Canada) Gianmarco Raimondo													11	10			10
20	(Italy) Michele Faccin	10	Ret															10
21	(Italy) Michael Dalle Stelle	14	16													11	11	0
22	(Italy) David Fumanelli					15	12					11	18					0
23	(Venezuela) Biagio Bulnes							16	13	Ret	13	Ret	11					0
24	(Italy) Nicolò Piancastelli											17	14	14	12			0
25	(Italy) Samuele Buttarelli											18	17					0
Pos	Driver	ADR		MAG		MUG		MIS		VAR		IMO		VAL		MZA		Pts

Colour	Result
Gold	Winner
Silver	Second place
Bronze	Third place
Green	Points classification
Blue	Non-points classification
Blue	Non-classified finish (NC)
Purple	Retired, not classified (Ret)
Red	Did not qualify (DNQ)
Red	Did not pre-qualify (DNPQ)
Black	Disqualified (DSQ)
White	Did not start (DNS)
White	Withdrew (WD)
White	Race cancelled (C)
Blank	Did not practice (DNP)
Blank	Did not arrive (DNA)
Blank	Excluded (EX)

**Bold** – Pole
Italics – Fastest Lap

=== Rookie ===
Pos	Driver	ADR		MAG		MUG		MIS		VAR		IMO		VAL		MZA		Pts
1	(Italy) Daniel Zampieri	**1**	5	**6**	1	1	3	2	11	**1**	Ret	7	4	**2**	3	**3**	4	227
2	(Italy) Sergio Campana	3	4	2	2	**5**	1	1	Ret	Ret	8	5	16	1	4	4	2	206
3	(Italy) Riccardo Cinti			8	7	13	Ret	9	8	5	3	8	7	Ret	7	9	Ret	126
4	(Italy) Edoardo Liberati	11	13	13	11	8	10	13	16	13	7	9	8	Ret	11	Ret	DNS	109
5	(Italy) Kevin Ceccon	8	7					11	9	12	9							59
6	(Greece) Stefanos Kamitsakis	6	1	7	Ret	Ret	Ret	Ret	12	DNS	DNS							51
7	(Canada) Gianmarco Raimondo													11	10			20
8	(Italy) Michele Faccin	10	Ret															8
Pos	Driver	ADR		MAG		MUG		MIS		VAR		IMO		VLL		MZA		Pts

Colour	Result
Gold	Winner
Silver	Second place
Bronze	Third place
Green	Points classification
Blue	Non-points classification
Blue	Non-classified finish (NC)
Purple	Retired, not classified (Ret)
Red	Did not qualify (DNQ)
Red	Did not pre-qualify (DNPQ)
Black	Disqualified (DSQ)
White	Did not start (DNS)
White	Withdrew (WD)
White	Race cancelled (C)
Blank	Did not practice (DNP)
Blank	Did not arrive (DNA)
Blank	Excluded (EX)

**Bold** – Pole
Italics – Fastest Lap
