= 2011 Italian Formula Three Championship =

Seasons
- ← 2010 2012 →

The 2011 Italian Formula Three Championship was the 47th Italian Formula Three Championship season. The season began on 15 May on the new for the championship Autodromo di Franciacorta and ended on 16 October at Monza after 16 races held at eight meetings.

With victories at Spa, Vallelunga, Sergio Campana of BVM – Target Racing finished the season as champion, becoming third driver in row to win championship for this team. He finished seventeen points clear of Prema Powerteam driver Michael Lewis, who won rookie championship and three races during the season. Third place went to his teammate and Ferrari Driver Academy driver Raffaele Marciello, who took two victories at Misano and Adria International Raceway. Fourth place in the championship was claimed by another Ferrari Driver Academy driver. BVM – Target Racing's Brandon Maïsano won races at Vallelunga as well as opening round at Franciacorta, while fifth went to double race-winner Edoardo Liberati from Lucidi Motors. Daniel Mancinelli took the other race victory on opening race at Franciacorta for RP Motorsport.

== Teams and drivers ==
- All cars are powered by FPT engines, and will run on Kumho tyres.

Team	No.	Driver	Chassis	Status	Rounds
(Italy) BVM – Target Racing	1	(Italy) Sergio Campana	Dallara F308		All
(Italy) BVM – Target Racing	2	(France) Brandon Maïsano	Dallara F308	R	All
(Italy) BVM – Target Racing	3	(France) Maxime Jousse	Dallara F308		All
(Italy) Prema Powerteam	4	(United States) Michael Lewis	Dallara F308	R	All
(Italy) Prema Powerteam	6	(Italy) Andrea Roda	Dallara F308		All
(Italy) Prema Powerteam	53	(Italy) Raffaele Marciello	Dallara F308	R	All
(Italy) Arco Motorsport	9	(Italy) Edoardo Liberati	Dallara F308		All
(Italy) Arco Motorsport	23	(Argentina) Facu Regalia	Dallara F308	R	All
(Italy) Arco Motorsport	28	(Italy) Luca Marco Spiga	Mygale M10	R	3
(Italy) RP Motorsport	16	(Italy) Daniel Mancinelli	Dallara F308		1–4
(Italy) RP Motorsport	21	(Finland) Jesse Krohn	Dallara F308		1–2
(Italy) RP Motorsport	21	(Italy) Niccolò Schirò	Dallara F308		3
(Italy) RP Motorsport	21	(Italy) David Fumanelli	Dallara F308		4
(Italy) Lucidi Motors	19	(Brazil) Victor Guerin	Dallara F308	R	All
(Italy) Lucidi Motors	22	(Monaco) Kevin Giovesi	Dallara F308		All
(Italy) Lucidi Motors	24	(Italy) Eddie Cheever III	Dallara F308	R	All
(United States) GTR Racing	28	(Italy) Luca Marco Spiga	Mygale M10	R	1–2
(Italy) Line Race/CO2 Motorsport (Italy) Island Motorsport	29	(Italy) Federico Vecchi	Dallara F308	R	All
(Italy) Line Race/CO2 Motorsport (Italy) Island Motorsport	31	(Italy) Edoardo Bacci	Dallara F308	R	7
(Italy) Downforce Competition	83	(Italy) Simone Iaquinta	Dallara F308	R	1–3
(Italy) JD Motorsport	83	(Italy) Simone Iaquinta	Dallara F308	R	5–8

Icon	Status
R	Rookie

== Race calendar and results ==
- An eight-round calendar was announced on 21 November 2010.

Round		Circuit	Date	Pole position	Fastest lap	Winning driver	Winning team	Rookie winner
1	R1	(Italy) Autodromo di Franciacorta	15 May	(Italy) Edoardo Liberati	(France) Maxime Jousse	(Italy) Daniel Mancinelli	(Italy) RP Motorsport	(France) Maxime Jousse
1	R2	(Italy) Autodromo di Franciacorta	15 May		(France) Brandon Maïsano	(France) Brandon Maïsano	(Italy) BVM – Target Racing	(France) Brandon Maïsano
2	R1	(Italy) Misano World Circuit	4 June	(Italy) Edoardo Liberati	(Italy) Edoardo Liberati	(Italy) Edoardo Liberati	(Italy) Arco Motorsport	(United States) Michael Lewis
2	R2	(Italy) Misano World Circuit	5 June		(Italy) Sergio Campana	(Italy) Raffaele Marciello	(Italy) Prema Powerteam	(Italy) Raffaele Marciello
3	R1	(Italy) Autodromo Enzo e Dino Ferrari, Imola	16 July	(Italy) Edoardo Liberati	(Italy) Sergio Campana	(Italy) Edoardo Liberati	(Italy) Arco Motorsport	(Argentina) Facu Regalia
3	R2	(Italy) Autodromo Enzo e Dino Ferrari, Imola	17 July		(Italy) Sergio Campana	(Monaco) Kevin Giovesi	(Italy) Lucidi Motors	(France) Brandon Maïsano
4	R1	(Belgium) Circuit de Spa-Francorchamps	6 August	(United States) Michael Lewis	(Italy) Raffaele Marciello	(United States) Michael Lewis	(Italy) Prema Powerteam	(United States) Michael Lewis
4	R2	(Belgium) Circuit de Spa-Francorchamps	7 August		(United States) Michael Lewis	(Italy) Sergio Campana	(Italy) BVM – Target Racing	(France) Maxime Jousse
5	R1	(Italy) Adria International Raceway	4 September	(France) Brandon Maïsano	(Italy) Raffaele Marciello	(Italy) Raffaele Marciello	(Italy) Prema Powerteam	(Italy) Raffaele Marciello
5	R2	(Italy) Adria International Raceway	4 September		(Argentina) Facu Regalia	(France) Maxime Jousse	(Italy) BVM – Target Racing	(France) Maxime Jousse
6	R1	(Italy) ACI Vallelunga Circuit	17 September	(Italy) Raffaele Marciello	(Italy) Sergio Campana	(Italy) Sergio Campana	(Italy) BVM – Target Racing	(Italy) Raffaele Marciello
6	R2	(Italy) ACI Vallelunga Circuit	18 September		(France) Brandon Maïsano	(France) Brandon Maïsano	(Italy) BVM – Target Racing	(France) Brandon Maïsano
7	R1	(Italy) Mugello Circuit	1 October	(Argentina) Facu Regalia	(Argentina) Facu Regalia	(United States) Michael Lewis	(Italy) Prema Powerteam	(United States) Michael Lewis
7	R2	(Italy) Mugello Circuit	2 October		(Monaco) Kevin Giovesi	(Monaco) Kevin Giovesi	(Italy) Lucidi Motors	(Italy) Eddie Cheever III
8	R1	(Italy) Autodromo Nazionale Monza	15 October	(United States) Michael Lewis	(United States) Michael Lewis	(United States) Michael Lewis	(Italy) Prema Powerteam	(United States) Michael Lewis
8	R2	(Italy) Autodromo Nazionale Monza	16 October		(United States) Michael Lewis	(Brazil) Victor Guerin	(Italy) Lucidi Motors	(Brazil) Victor Guerin

== Championship standings ==
=== Drivers' Championship ===
- Points are awarded as follows:

	1	2	3	4	5	6	7	8	9	10	PP	FL
Race 1	20	15	12	10	8	6	4	3	2	1	**1**	1
Race 2	13	11	9	7	6	5	4	3	2	1		1

Pos	Driver	FRA (Italy)		MIS (Italy)		IMO (Italy)		SPA (Belgium)		ADR (Italy)		VLL (Italy)		MUG (Italy)		MZA (Italy)		Total	Drop	Pts
1	(Italy) Sergio Campana	14	7	3	3	2	3	4	1	6	6	1	7	4	2	2	5	153	4	149
2	(United States) Michael Lewis	10	3	2	6	6	4	**1**	6	11	Ret	3	6	1	5	**1**	11	136		136
3	(Italy) Raffaele Marciello	3	6	10	1	Ret	5	3	4	1	10	**2**	12	6	6	6	2	123		123
4	(France) Brandon Maïsano	11	1	8	8	4	2	7	3	**2**	4	6	1	9	9	5	3	118	2	116
5	(Italy) Edoardo Liberati	**4**	13	**1**	7	**1**	DSQ	14	10	4	8	5	4	2	7	9	4	115		115
6	(France) Maxime Jousse	2	11	5	5	5	Ret	2	2	5	1	12	5	7	10	3	7	112		112
7	(Monaco) Kevin Giovesi	5	4	4	14	7	1	5	9	7	2	4	9	11	1	Ret	6	98		98
8	(Brazil) Victor Guerin	9	2	Ret	12	12	7	9	5	12	3	7	3	3	4	4	1	89		89
9	(Italy) Eddie Cheever III	6	5	7	2	Ret	6	8	8	3	5	10	8	5	3	Ret	Ret	77		77
10	(Argentina) Facu Regalia	Ret	14	6	4	3	Ret	6	7	8	Ret	11	2	**Ret**	8	DNS	DNS	55		55
11	(Italy) Daniel Mancinelli	1	8	Ret	9	9	8	13	13									30		30
12	(Italy) Andrea Roda	12	12	11	Ret	8	9	11	11	10	7	8	10	12	11	7	9	20		20
13	(Italy) Simone Iaquinta	8	10	Ret	11	13	12			9	Ret	Ret	13	8	Ret	8	8	15		15
14	(Finland) Jesse Krohn	7	9	9	15													8		8
15	(Italy) Federico Vecchi	13	15	12	10	11	10	12	12	13	9	9	11	Ret	12	10	10	8		8
16	(Italy) Niccolò Schirò					10	11											1		1
17	(Italy) Edoardo Bacci													10	13			1		1
18	(Italy) David Fumanelli							10	Ret									1		1
19	(Italy) Luca Marco Spiga	15	16	13	13	14	13											0		0
Pos	Driver	FRA (Italy)		MIS (Italy)		IMO (Italy)		SPA (Belgium)		ADR (Italy)		VLL (Italy)		MUG (Italy)		MZA (Italy)		Total	Drop	Pts

Colour	Result
Gold	Winner
Silver	Second place
Bronze	Third place
Green	Points classification
Blue	Non-points classification
Blue	Non-classified finish (NC)
Purple	Retired, not classified (Ret)
Red	Did not qualify (DNQ)
Red	Did not pre-qualify (DNPQ)
Black	Disqualified (DSQ)
White	Did not start (DNS)
White	Withdrew (WD)
White	Race cancelled (C)
Blank	Did not practice (DNP)
Blank	Did not arrive (DNA)
Blank	Excluded (EX)

**Bold** – Pole
Italics – Fastest Lap

=== Teams' Championship ===
Pos	Team	FRA (Italy)		MIS (Italy)		IMO (Italy)		SPA (Belgium)		ADR (Italy)		VLL (Italy)		MUG (Italy)		MZA (Italy)		Pts
1	(Italy) BVM – Target Racing	2	1	3	3	2	2	2	1	2	1	1	1	4	2	2	3	209
2	(Italy) Prema Powerteam	3	3	2	1	6	4	1	4	1	7	2	6	1	5	1	2	191
3	(Italy) Lucidi Motors	5	2	4	2	7	1	5	5	3	2	4	3	3	1	4	1	161
4	(Italy) Ghinzani Arco Motorsport	4	13	1	4	1	5	6	7	4	8	5	2	2	8	9	4	126
5	(Italy) RP Motorsport	1	8	9	9	9	9	10	13									33
6	(Italy) JD Motorsport									9	Ret	Ret	13	8	Ret	8	8	11
7	(Italy) Line Race/CO2 Motorsport (Italy) Island Motorsport	13	15	12	10	11	10	12	12	13	9	9	11	10	12	10	10	8
8	(Italy) Downforce Competition/ARM Competition	8	10	Ret	11	13	13											4
9	(United States) GTR Racing	15	16	13	13													0
Pos	Team	FRA (Italy)		MIS (Italy)		IMO (Italy)		SPA (Belgium)		ADR (Italy)		VLL (Italy)		MUG (Italy)		MZA (Italy)		Pts

=== Rookies' Championship ===
Pos	Driver	FRA (Italy)		MIS (Italy)		IMO (Italy)		SPA (Belgium)		ADR (Italy)		VLL (Italy)		MUG (Italy)		MZA (Italy)		Total	Drop	Pts
1	(United States) Michael Lewis	10	3	2	6	6	4	1	6	11	Ret	3	6	1	5	1	11	162		162
2	(Italy) Raffaele Marciello	3	6	10	1	Ret	5	3	4	1	10	2	12	6	6	6	2	154	3	151
3	(France) Maxime Jousse	2	11	5	5	5	Ret	2	2	5	1	12	5	7	10	3	7	153	3	150
4	(France) Brandon Maïsano	11	1	8	8	4	2	7	3	2	4	6	1	9	9	5	3	154	8	146
5	(Brazil) Victor Guerin	9	2	Ret	12	12	7	9	5	12	3	7	3	3	4	4	1	128	2	126
6	(Italy) Eddie Cheever III	6	5	7	2	Ret	6	8	8	3	5	10	8	5	3	Ret	Ret	112		112
7	(Argentina) Facu Regalia	Ret	14	6	4	3	Ret	6	7	8	Ret	11	2	Ret	8	DNS	DNS	88		88
8	(Italy) Federico Vecchi	13	15	12	10	11	10	12	12	13	9	9	11	Ret	12	10	10	64		64
9	(Italy) Simone Iaquinta	8	10	Ret	11	13	12			9	Ret	Ret	13	8	Ret	8	8	52		52
10	(Italy) Luca Marco Spiga	15	16	13	13	14	13											13		13
11	(Italy) Edoardo Bacci													10	13			5		5
Pos	Driver	FRA (Italy)		MIS (Italy)		IMO (Italy)		SPA (Belgium)		ADR (Italy)		VLL (Italy)		MUG (Italy)		MZA (Italy)		Total	Drop	Pts
