= 2012 International GT Open =

Seasons
- ← 2011 2013 →

The 2012 International GT Open season was the seventh season of the International GT Open, the grand tourer-style sports car racing founded in 2006 by the Spanish GT Sport Organización. It began on 28 April at Portimão and finished on 4 November, at Circuit de Catalunya after eight double-header meetings.

The season was won by AF Corse drivers Gianmaria Bruni and Federico Leo, who raced on the Ferrari F458 GT Italia. They also won the Super GT standings. Michael Dalle Stelle and Daniel Zampieri, who raced behind the wheel of Kessel Racing's Ferrari F458 Italia GT3 won the GTS class.

== Race calendar and results ==
- The series' provisional calendar was announced on 29 October 2011.

Round		Circuit	Date	SGT Winner	GTS Winner
1	R1	(Portugal) Autódromo Internacional do Algarve, Portimão	28 April	No. 8 Manthey Racing	No. 56 AF Corse
1	R1	(Portugal) Autódromo Internacional do Algarve, Portimão	28 April	(Germany) Marco Holzer (United Kingdom) Nick Tandy	(Italy) Stefano Bizzarri (Italy) Nicola Cadei
1	R2	(Portugal) Autódromo Internacional do Algarve, Portimão	29 April	No. 8 Manthey Racing	No. 54 Autorlando Sport
1	R2	(Portugal) Autódromo Internacional do Algarve, Portimão	29 April	(Germany) Marco Holzer (United Kingdom) Nick Tandy	(Italy) Marco Mapelli (United Kingdom) Archie Hamilton
2	R1	(Germany) Nürburgring	26 May	No. 4 AF Corse	No. 63 Seyffarth Motorsport
2	R1	(Germany) Nürburgring	26 May	(Italy) Gianmaria Bruni (Italy) Federico Leo	(Germany) Kenneth Heyer (Germany) Jan Seyffarth
2	R2	(Germany) Nürburgring	27 May	No. 2 Scuderia Villorba	No. 63 Seyffarth Motorsport
2	R2	(Germany) Nürburgring	27 May	(Argentina) Juan Manuel López (Italy) Andrea Montermini	(Germany) Kenneth Heyer (Germany) Jan Seyffarth
3	R1	(Belgium) Circuit de Spa-Francorchamps	23 June	No. 4 AF Corse	No. 56 AF Corse
3	R1	(Belgium) Circuit de Spa-Francorchamps	23 June	(Italy) Gianmaria Bruni (Italy) Federico Leo	(Italy) Stefano Bizzarri (Italy) Andrea Rizzoli
3	R2	(Belgium) Circuit de Spa-Francorchamps	24 June	No. 8 Manthey Racing	No. 44 Kessel Racing
3	R2	(Belgium) Circuit de Spa-Francorchamps	24 June	(Germany) Marco Holzer (United Kingdom) Nick Tandy	(Italy) Michael Dalle Stelle (Italy) Daniel Zampieri
4	R1	(United Kingdom) Brands Hatch	14 July	No. 11 Kessel Racing	No. 54 Autorlando Sport
4	R1	(United Kingdom) Brands Hatch	14 July	(Austria) Philipp Peter (Poland) Michał Broniszewski	(Italy) Marco Mapelli (United Kingdom) Archie Hamilton
4	R2	(United Kingdom) Brands Hatch	15 July	No. 12 Villois Racing	No. 54 Autorlando Sport
4	R2	(United Kingdom) Brands Hatch	15 July	(Spain) Álvaro Barba (Italy) Matteo Malucelli	(Italy) Marco Mapelli (United Kingdom) Archie Hamilton
5	R1	(France) Circuit Paul Ricard	21 July	No. 12 Villois Racing	No. 44 Kessel Racing
5	R1	(France) Circuit Paul Ricard	21 July	(Spain) Álvaro Barba (Italy) Matteo Malucelli	(Italy) Michael Dalle Stelle (Italy) Daniel Zampieri
5	R2	(France) Circuit Paul Ricard	22 July	No. 2 Scuderia Villorba	No. 55 Autorlando Sport
5	R2	(France) Circuit Paul Ricard	22 July	(Argentina) Juan Manuel López (Italy) Andrea Montermini	(Italy) Matteo Beretta (Italy) Marcello Puglisi
6	R1	(Hungary) Hungaroring	8 September	No. 17 V8 Racing	No. 56 AF Corse
6	R1	(Hungary) Hungaroring	8 September	(Portugal) Miguel Ramos (Italy) Raffaele Giammaria	(Italy) Stefano Bizzarri (Italy) Nicola Cadei
6	R2	(Hungary) Hungaroring	9 September	No. 12 Villois Racing	No. 44 Kessel Racing
6	R2	(Hungary) Hungaroring	9 September	(Spain) Álvaro Barba (Italy) Matteo Malucelli	(Italy) Michael Dalle Stelle (Italy) Daniel Zampieri
7	R1	(Italy) Autodromo Nazionale Monza	29 September	No. 16 IMSA Performance Matmut	No. 55 Autorlando Sport
7	R1	(Italy) Autodromo Nazionale Monza	29 September	(France) Raymond Narac (France) Patrick Pilet	(Italy) Matteo Beretta (Italy) Marcello Puglisi
7	R2	(Italy) Autodromo Nazionale Monza	30 September	No. 12 Villois Racing	No. 44 Kessel Racing
7	R2	(Italy) Autodromo Nazionale Monza	30 September	(Spain) Álvaro Barba (Italy) Matteo Malucelli	(Italy) Michael Dalle Stelle (Italy) Daniel Zampieri
8	R1	(Spain) Circuit de Catalunya	3 November	No. 12 Villois Racing	No. 91 GPR Racing
8	R1	(Spain) Circuit de Catalunya	3 November	(Spain) Álvaro Barba (Italy) Matteo Malucelli	(Belgium) Maxime Martin (Belgium) Bertrand Baguette
8	R2	(Spain) Circuit de Catalunya	4 November	No. 8 Manthey Racing	No. 56 AF Corse
8	R2	(Spain) Circuit de Catalunya	4 November	(Germany) Marco Holzer (United Kingdom) Nick Tandy	(Italy) Stefano Bizzarri (Italy) Andrea Rizzoli

== Standings ==
=== Drivers ===
==== Super GT ====
Pos	Driver	Pts
1	(Italy) Gianmaria Bruni	85
1	(Italy) Federico Leo	85
3	(Germany) Marco Holzer	84
3	(United Kingdom) Nick Tandy	84
5	(Spain) Álvaro Barba	76
5	(Italy) Matteo Malucelli	76
7	(Italy) Raffaele Giammaria	67
7	(Portugal) Miguel Ramos	67
9	(Italy) Andrea Montermini	65
9	(Argentina) Juan Manuel López	65
11	(France) Patrick Pilet	63
11	(France) Raymond Narac	63
13	(Austria) Philipp Peter	38

=== Teams ===
==== Super GT ====
Pos	Team	Pts
1	AF Corse	85
2	Manthey Racing	84
3	Villois Racing	76
4	V8 Racing	69
5	Scuderia Villorba	65
6	IMSA Performance Matmut	63
7	Kessel Racing	38
8	Black Team	13
9	Drivex School	3
