= Daniel Zampieri =

Italian racing driver

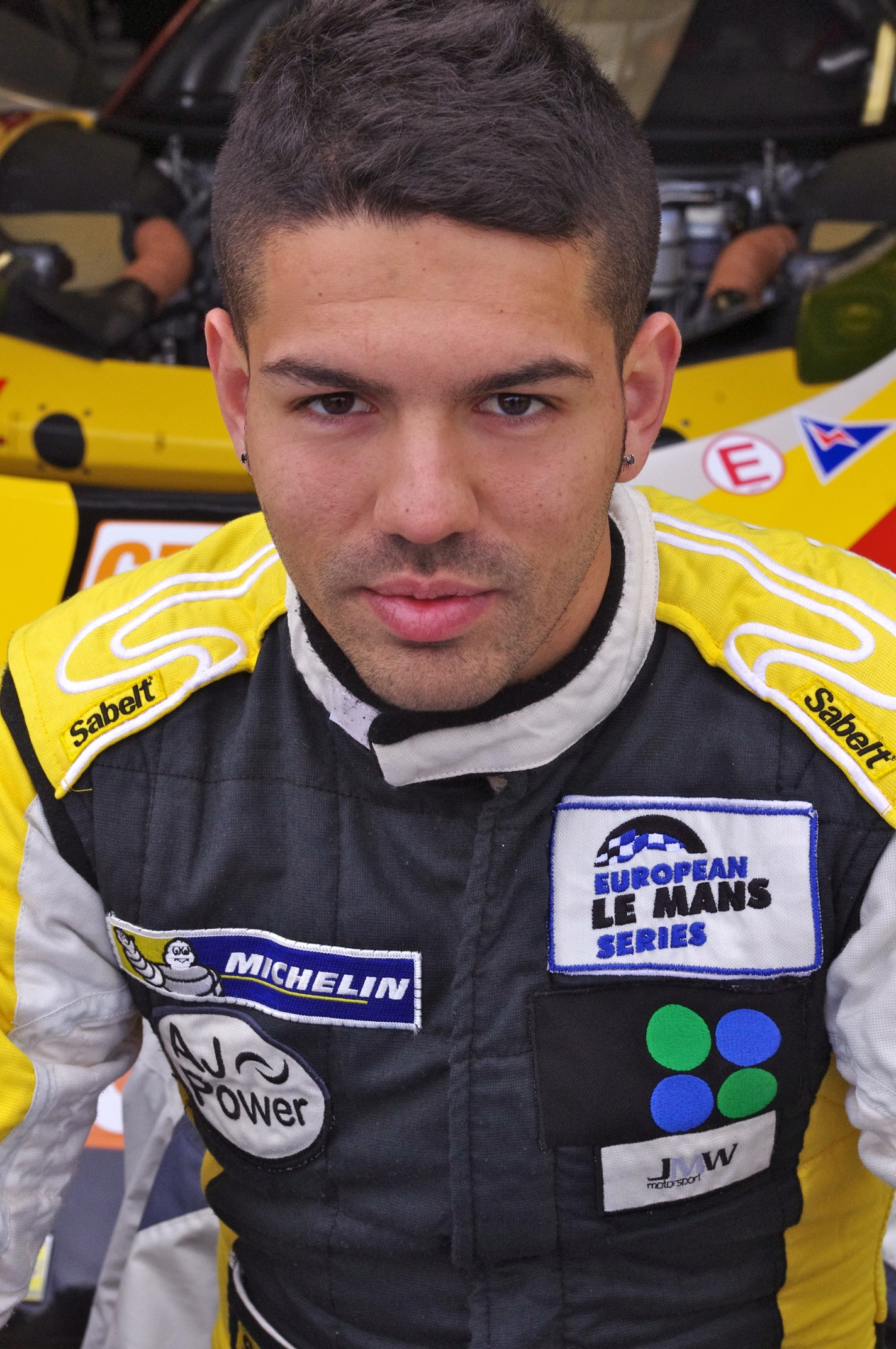
- Zampieri in 2014
- Nationality: (Italy) Italian
- Born: 22 May 1990 (age 36) Rome, Italy

International GT Open career
- Debut season: 2012
- Current team: Antonelli Motorsport
- Categorisation: FIA Platinum (until 2014); FIA Gold (2015–)
- Car number: 6
- Former teams: Kessel Racing, SMP Racing Russian Bears
- Starts: 48
- Wins: 4
- Poles: 4
- Fastest laps: 5
- Best finish: 1st in 2014

Previous series
- 2010–12 2009–10 2009 2006–08 2006–08 2006–07: World Series by Renault; GP2 Asia Series; Italian Formula Three; Eurocup Formula Renault 2.0; Italian Formula Renault 2.0; Italian FR2.0 Winter Series

Championship titles
- 2014 2012 2009: International GT Open; International GT Open - GTS; Italian Formula Three

Daniel Zampieri (born 22 May 1990, in Rome) is an Italian racing driver.

== Career ==
=== Formula Renault ===
After a two-year international karting career, Zampieri moved up to Formula Renault with BVM Racing in 2006. Making his debut in Italian Formula Renault at Spa–Francorchamps, Zampieri finished 17th and 18th on début. His best finish of the championship came at another Formula One venue, Hockenheim, when he finished eleventh in the opening race. He also took part in six Eurocup races for BVM, again with a best finish of eleventh in Barcelona. To gain more Formula Renault experience, Zampieri committed to a campaign in the Italian Formula Renault Winter Series. He finished the championship in ninth place, tied on fifty points with Nicola de Marco.

Zampieri moved to Cram Competition for the 2007 season, competing in the European and Italian series once again. Zampieri broke into the top ten of a Eurocup race for the first time, finishing tenth at Magny–Cours, giving him a final championship placing of 22nd, tied on points with Jules Bianchi. He added consistent finishes in the Italian series, ending up with three top-tens, including a sixth at Spa, and finished fifteenth overall in the championship. He returned for another shot at the Winter Series title, and finished as runner–up (edging out Fabio Onidi on a tie–break) behind César Ramos, who recorded a perfect score for the four–race series.

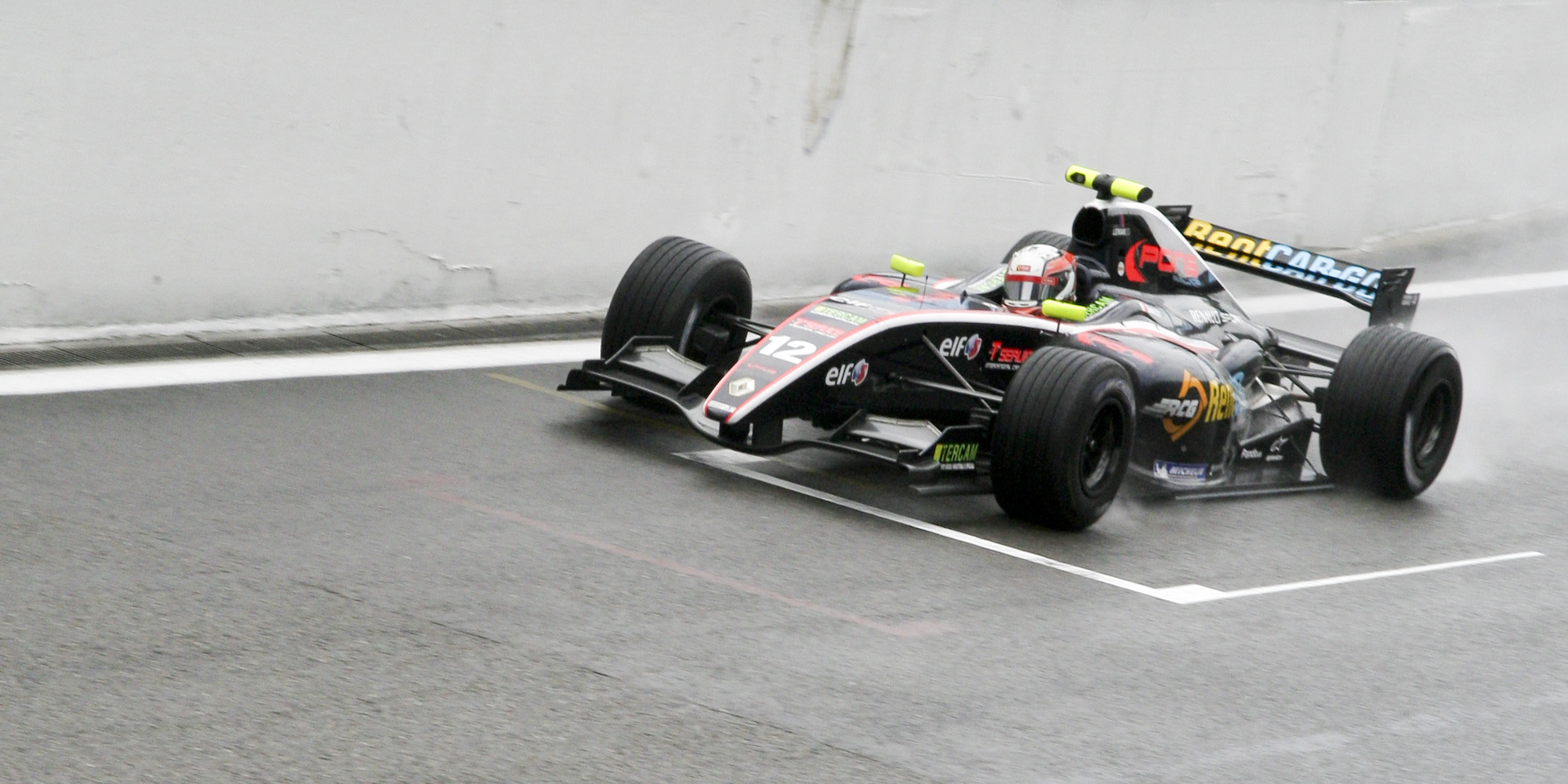
Zampieri driving for Pons Racing at the Spa–Francorchamps round of the 2010 Formula Renault 3.5 Series season.

Zampieri returned to BVM for the 2008 season; his third season in each category, teaming up with his rival from the Winter Series, Ramos and British driver Adrian Quaife-Hobbs. In the Eurocup, Zampieri again recorded his best results in Belgium, at Spa. A fourth place in race one was followed by his first (and ultimately, only) podium with third in the second race. After Spa, he scored only one more point as he tailed off to tenth in the championship. He finished one place higher in the Italian standings, but again failed to win a race, with a best result of second coming at the opening race at Vallelunga.

=== Formula Three ===
Zampieri moved up to Formula Three in 2009, staying with BVM for a campaign in the Italian Formula Three Championship. Zampieri won the championship by fifteen points from Marco Zipoli. He won four races, got five poles and set three fastest laps over the course of the season. He also competed in the non–championship Masters of Formula 3 event at Zandvoort, finishing 21st.

As a reward for his title win, Zampieri conducted a Formula One test with Ferrari at the Circuito de Jerez. He was subsequently named an official Ferrari Driver Academy member for 2010.

=== GP2 Series ===
Zampieri raced in the 2009–10 season of the GP2 Asia Series for the Rapax Team, who took over his original Piquet GP team after the first round of the season.

=== Formula Renault 3.5 Series ===
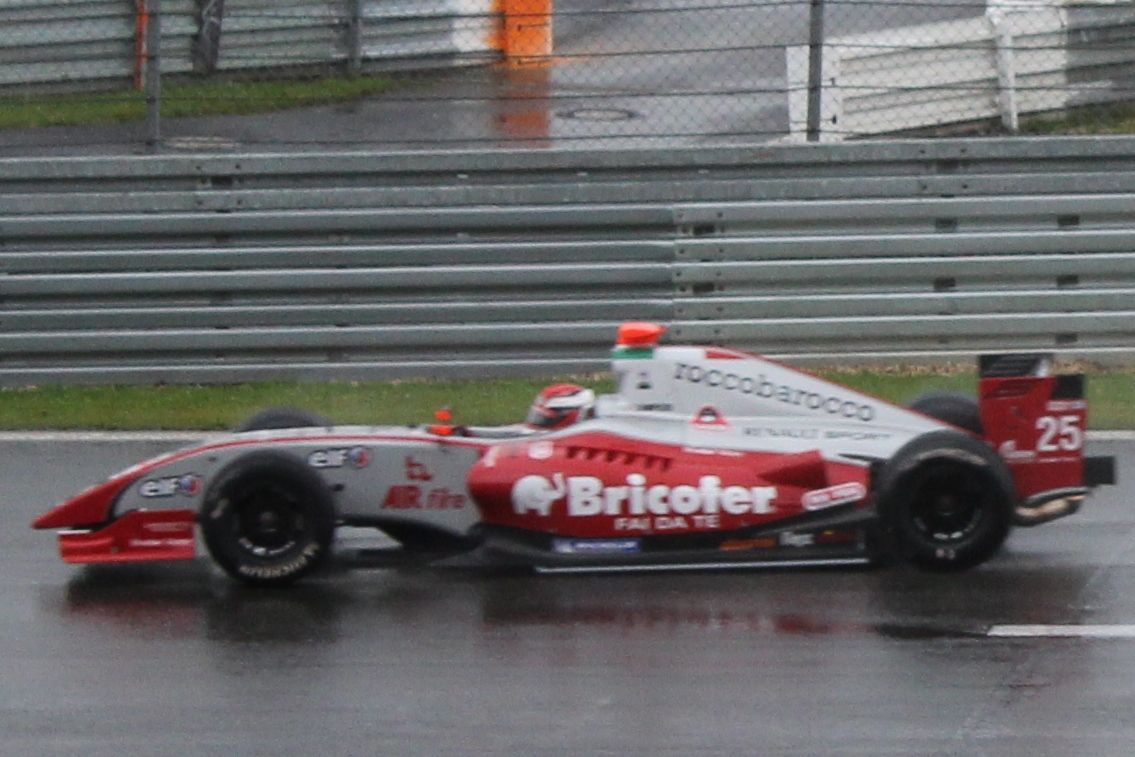
Zampieri at the 2011 Nürburgring World Series by Renault round.

Zampieri graduated to the Formula Renault 3.5 Series for the 2010 season, partnering Federico Leo at Pons Racing. He finished the season in ninth place after securing podium places at both Motorland Aragón and Spa–Francorchamps. His season, however, was not without incident. He was disqualified from the second races at both Hockenheim and Barcelona and banned from starting the opening race at Silverstone after an altercation with ISR Racing team boss Igor Salaquarda after Zampieri felt that their driver Filip Salaquarda had blocked him during qualifying.

After testing extensively for the team during the off–season, Zampieri joined new team BVM–Target for the 2011 season, racing alongside Sergio Canamasas.

== Racing record ==
=== Career summary ===
Season	Series	Team	Races	Wins	Poles	F/Laps	Podiums	Points	Position
2006	Eurocup Formula Renault 2.0	BVM Minardi	6	0	0	0	0	1	28th
2006	Italian Formula Renault 2.0	BVM Minardi	9	0	0	0	0	0	NC
2006	Italian Formula Renault 2.0 Winter Series	BVM Minardi	4	0	0	?	0	50	9th
2007	Eurocup Formula Renault 2.0	Cram Competition	14	0	0	0	0	4	22nd
2007	Italian Formula Renault 2.0	Cram Competition	14	0	0	1	0	80	15th
2007	Italian Formula Renault 2.0 Winter Series	Cram Competition	4	0	0	0	1	86	**2nd**
2008	Eurocup Formula Renault 2.0	BVM Minardi	12	0	0	1	1	20	12th
2008	Italian Formula Renault 2.0	BVM Minardi	14	0	0	0	2	158	9th
2009	Italian Formula 3 Championship	BVM - Target Racing	16	4	5	3	9	173	**1st**
2009	Masters of Formula 3	BVM - Target Racing	1	0	0	0	0	N/A	21st
2009	Macau Grand Prix	Prema Powerteam	1	0	0	0	0	N/A	NC
2009–10	GP2 Asia Series	Piquet GP	2	0	0	0	0	0	22nd
2009–10	GP2 Asia Series	Rapax Team	4	0	0	0	0	0	22nd
2010	Formula Renault 3.5 Series	Pons Racing	16	0	0	1	2	51	9th
2011	Formula Renault 3.5 Series	BVM Target	17	0	0	0	0	28	16th
2012	International GT Open	Kessel Racing	16	0	0	0	1	112	8th
2012	International GT Open - GTS	Kessel Racing	16	3	4	3	10	88	**1st**
2012	Blancpain Endurance Series	Kessel Racing	6	0	2	0	1	45	10th
2012	Formula Renault 3.5 Series	BVM Target	2	0	0	0	0	1	27th
2013	Blancpain Endurance Series	Kessel Racing	5	1	0	0	1	50	4th
2013	International GT Open - GTS	Kessel Racing	4	0	0	0	0	0	NC
2013	Spanish GT Championship	Kessel Racing	?	0	0	0	0	2	23rd
2014	International GT Open	SMP Racing Russian Bears	16	3	3	5	10	104	**1st**
2014	Blancpain Endurance Series	SMP Racing Russian Bears	1	0	0	0	0	0	NC
2014	European Le Mans Series - LMGTE	JMW Motorsport	3	0	0	0	2	40	8th
2015	Lamborghini Super Trofeo Europe	Antonelli Motorsport	11	1	2	3	6	91	**2nd**
2016	Blancpain GT Series Sprint Cup	Attempto Racing	9	0	0	0	0	1	30th
2016	Blancpain GT Series Endurance Cup	Attempto Racing	5	0	0	0	0	2	46th
2016	24H Series - A6-Am	Attempto Racing	1	0	0	0	0	0	NC
2016	ADAC GT Masters	ADAC NSA / Attempto Racing	6	0	0	0	0	0	NC
2016	International GT Open	Antonelli Motorsport	2	1	1	0	1	0	NC†
2017	Italian GT Championship - GT3	Antonelli Motorsport	14	1	1	1	9	151	4th
2018	Italian GT Championship - GT3	Antonelli Motorsport	14	3	4	3	8	159	**1st**
2018	Lamborghini Super Trofeo Europe	Antonelli Motorsport	10	3	1	2	5	?	?
2018	Lamborghini Super Trofeo World Final	Antonelli Motorsport	2	1	1	1	1	18	**1st**
2019	International GT Open	Antonelli Motorsport	10	0	0	0	1	20	14th
2020	Italian GT Endurance Championship - GT3	AKM Motorsport	1	0	0	0	0	0	NC
2020	Italian GT Sprint Championship - GT3	AKM Motorsport	2	1	0	0	1	20	15th
2021	Italian GT Endurance Championship - GT3	Scuderia Baldini 27	4	0	1	0	3	42	**3rd**
2021	Italian GT Sprint Championship - GT3	AF Corse	2	0	1	0	2	?	?

^{†} As Zampieri was a guest driver, he was ineligible to score points.

=== Complete Eurocup Formula Renault 2.0 results ===
(key) (Races in bold indicate pole position; races in italics indicate fastest lap)

Year	Entrant	1	2	3	4	5	6	7	8	9	10	11	12	13	14	DC	Points
2006	BVM Minardi	ZOL; 1	ZOL; 2	IST; 1	IST; 2	MIS; 1; 19	MIS; 2; 25	NÜR; 1 Ret	NÜR; 2 Ret	DON; 1	DON; 2	LMS; 1	LMS; 2	CAT; 1; 11	CAT; 2 Ret	28th	1
2007	Cram Competition	ZOL; 1; 14	ZOL; 2; 14	NÜR; 1; 11	NÜR; 2 Ret	HUN; 1; 17	HUN; 2; 22	DON; 1; 24	DON; 2; 11	MAG; 1; 10	MAG; 2 Ret	EST; 1; 23	EST; 2; 21	CAT; 1; 34	CAT; 2; 15	22nd	4
2008	BVM Minardi	SPA; 1; 4	SPA; 2; 3	SIL; 1; 14	SIL; 2 Ret	HUN; 1; 13	HUN; 2; 10	NÜR; 1; 21	NÜR; 2 Ret	LMS; 1 Ret	LMS; 2; 12	EST; 1 Ret	EST; 2 DNS	CAT; 1; 10	CAT; 2; 15	12th	20

=== Complete GP2 Series results ===
==== Complete GP2 Asia Series results ====
(key) (Races in bold indicate pole position) (Races in italics indicate fastest lap)

Year	Entrant	1	2	3	4	5	6	7	8	DC	Points
2009–10	Piquet GP	ABU1; FEA; 15	ABU1; SPR; Ret							22nd	0
2009–10	Rapax Team			ABU2; FEA; Ret	ABU2; SPR; 15	BHR1; FEA; 11	BHR1; SPR; 8	BHR2; FEA	BHR2; SPR	22nd	0

=== Complete Formula Renault 3.5 Series results ===
(key) (Races in bold indicate pole position) (Races in italics indicate fastest lap)

Year	Team	1	2	3	4	5	6	7	8	9	10	11	12	13	14	15	16	17	Pos	Points
2010	Pons Racing	ALC; 1; 2	ALC; 2 Ret	SPA; 1; 12	SPA; 2; 2	MON; 1 Ret	BRN; 1 Ret	BRN; 2; 15	MAG; 1; 5	MAG; 2; 11	HUN; 1; 13	HUN; 2; 4	HOC; 1; 4	HOC; 2 DSQ	SIL; 1 EX	SIL; 2; 6	CAT; 1 Ret	CAT; 2 DSQ	9th	51
2011	BVM–Target	ALC; 1; 9	ALC; 2; 21	SPA; 1; 18	SPA; 2; 4	MNZ; 1 Ret	MNZ; 2; 17	MON; 1; 14	NÜR; 1; 7	NÜR; 2; 9	HUN; 1; 12	HUN; 2; 9	SIL; 1 Ret	SIL; 2; 13	LEC; 1; 13	LEC; 2; 8	CAT; 1; 12	CAT; 2 Ret	16th	28
2012	BVM Target	ALC; 1	ALC; 2	MON; 1	SPA; 1	SPA; 2	NÜR; 1	NÜR; 2	MSC; 1	MSC; 2	SIL; 1; 10	SIL; 2 Ret	HUN; 1	HUN; 2	LEC; 1	LEC; 2	CAT; 1	CAT; 2	27th	1

=== Complete Blancpain GT Series results ===
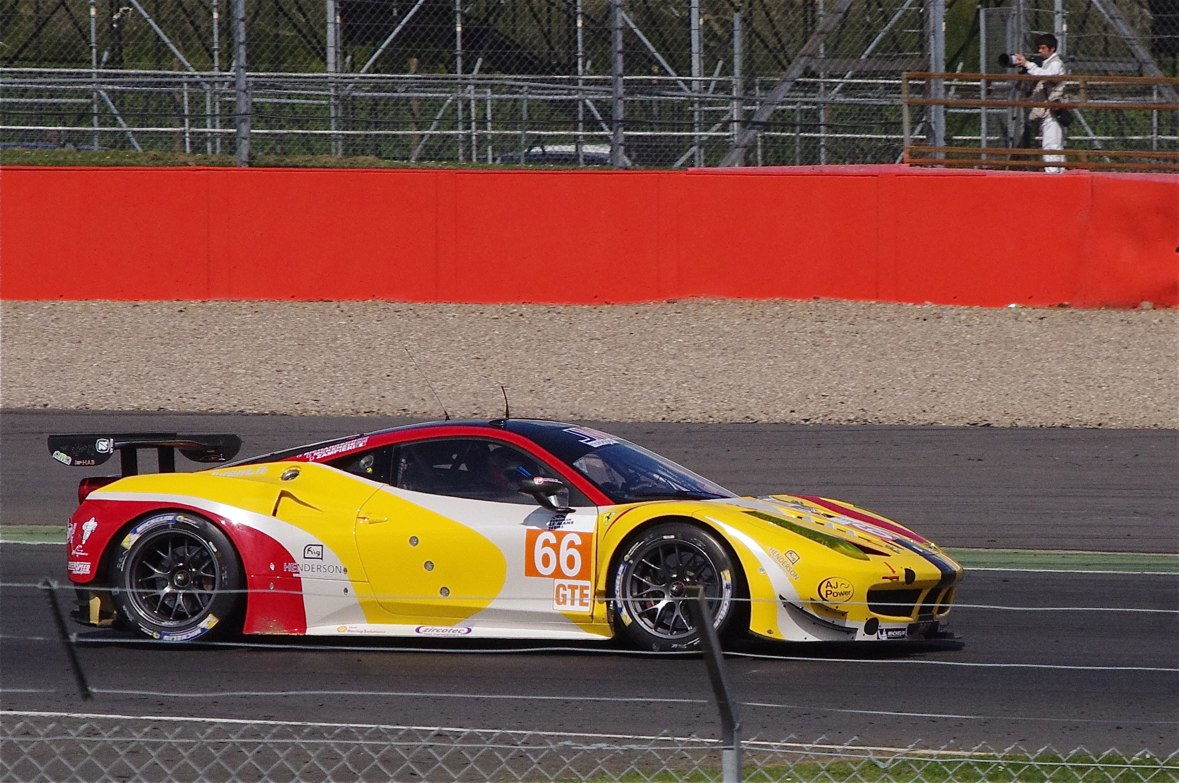
Zampieri's JMW Ferrari at Silverstone in 2014.

==== Blancpain GT Series Endurance Cup ====
Year	Team	Car	Class	1	2	3	4	5	6	Pos.	Points
2012	Kessel Racing	Ferrari 458 Italia GT3	Pro	**MNZ**; 4	SIL; 11	**LEC**; 3	SPA; Ret	NÜR; 33	NAV; 6	10th	45
2013	Kessel Racing	Ferrari 458 Italia GT3	Pro	MNZ; 1	SIL; 6	LEC; 4	SPA; 20	NÜR; 20		4th	50
2014	SMP Racing Russian Bears	Ferrari 458 Italia GT3	Pro-Am	MNZ	SIL	LEC	SPA; Ret	NÜR		NC	0
2016	Attempto Racing	Lamborghini Huracán GT3	Pro	MNZ; 19	SIL; 10	LEC; 10	SPA; 14	NÜR; 22		46th	2

==== Blancpain GT Series Sprint Cup ====
Year	Team	Car	Class	1	2	3	4	5	6	7	8	9	10	Pos.	Points
2016	Attempto Racing	Lamborghini Huracán GT3	Pro	MIS; QR; 18	MIS; CR; 10	BRH; QR; 25	BRH; CR; Ret	NÜR; QR; 12	NÜR; CR; 19	HUN; QR; Ret	HUN; CR; DNS	CAT; QR; 17	CAT; CR; 19	30th	1

=== Complete European Le Mans Series results ===
Year	Team	Class	Car	Engine	1	2	3	4	5	Rank	Points
2014	JMW Motorsport	LMGTE	Ferrari F458 Italia	Ferrari 4.5 L V8	SIL; 5	IMO; 3	RBR	LEC	EST; 3	8th	40

Sporting positions
Preceded by Mirko Bortolotti	Italian Formula Three Champion; 2009	Succeeded by César Ramos
Preceded by Andrea Montermini	International GT Open champion 2014; With: Roman Mavlanov	Succeeded by Incumbent
