= 2013 24 Hours of Spa =

2013 Total Spa 24 Hours

Seasons
- ← 2012 2014 →

Layout of the Circuit de Spa-Francorchamps

The 2013 Total 24 Hours of Spa was the 66th running of the 24 Hours of Spa. It was also the fourth round of the 2013 Blancpain Endurance Series season and was held on 27 and 28 July at the Circuit de Spa-Francorchamps, Belgium. The race was won by the German trio of Bernd Schneider, Maximilian Buhk, and Maximilian Götz of HTP Motorsport in their Mercedes-Benz SLS AMG GT3. The victory was the third ever for Mercedes-Benz, their previous win dating back to 1964.

== Race ==
=== Race result ===
Pos	Class	No	Team	Drivers	Chassis	Tyre	Laps	Qual
Pos	Class	No	Team	Drivers	Engine	Tyre	Laps	Qual
1	Pro Cup	84	(Germany) HTP Motorsport	(Germany) Maximilian Buhk (Germany) Maximilian Götz (Germany) Bernd Schneider	Mercedes-Benz SLS AMG GT3	P	564	3
1	Pro Cup	84	(Germany) HTP Motorsport	(Germany) Maximilian Buhk (Germany) Maximilian Götz (Germany) Bernd Schneider	Mercedes-Benz 6.2 L V8	P	564	3
2	Pro Cup	150	(Germany) Manthey Racing	(Germany) Marc Lieb (Austria) Richard Lietz (France) Patrick Pilet	Porsche 997 GT3 R	P	563	9
2	Pro Cup	150	(Germany) Manthey Racing	(Germany) Marc Lieb (Austria) Richard Lietz (France) Patrick Pilet	Porsche 4.0 L Flat-6	P	563	9
3	Pro Cup	2	(Belgium) Belgian Audi Club Team WRT	(Germany) Frank Stippler (Germany) Christopher Mies (Germany) André Lotterer	Audi R8 LMS ultra	P	558	31
3	Pro Cup	2	(Belgium) Belgian Audi Club Team WRT	(Germany) Frank Stippler (Germany) Christopher Mies (Germany) André Lotterer	Audi 5.2 L V10	P	558	31
4	Pro Cup	6	(Germany) Phoenix Racing	(Switzerland) Harold Primat (United Kingdom) Oliver Jarvis (Germany) Christopher Haase	Audi R8 LMS ultra	P	557	30
4	Pro Cup	6	(Germany) Phoenix Racing	(Switzerland) Harold Primat (United Kingdom) Oliver Jarvis (Germany) Christopher Haase	Audi 5.2 L V10	P	557	30
5	Pro-Am Cup	59	(Italy) AF Corse	(United Kingdom) Duncan Cameron (United Kingdom) Alex Mortimer (Republic of Ireland) Matt Griffin (Finland) Toni Vilander	Ferrari 458 Italia GT3	P	557	6
5	Pro-Am Cup	59	(Italy) AF Corse	(United Kingdom) Duncan Cameron (United Kingdom) Alex Mortimer (Republic of Ireland) Matt Griffin (Finland) Toni Vilander	Ferrari 4.5 L V8	P	557	6
6	Pro-Am Cup	71	(Russia) SMP Racing	(Russia) Kirill Ladygin (Russia) Viktor Shaitar (Finland) Mika Salo (Italy) Maurizio Mediani	Ferrari 458 Italia GT3	P	556	29
6	Pro-Am Cup	71	(Russia) SMP Racing	(Russia) Kirill Ladygin (Russia) Viktor Shaitar (Finland) Mika Salo (Italy) Maurizio Mediani	Ferrari 4.5 L V8	P	556	29
7	Pro-Am Cup	35	(United Kingdom) Nissan GT Academy Team RJN	(Spain) Lucas Ordóñez (United Kingdom) Jann Mardenborough (Germany) Peter Pyzera (Belgium) Wolfgang Reip	Nissan GT-R Nismo GT3	P	553	22
7	Pro-Am Cup	35	(United Kingdom) Nissan GT Academy Team RJN	(Spain) Lucas Ordóñez (United Kingdom) Jann Mardenborough (Germany) Peter Pyzera (Belgium) Wolfgang Reip	Nissan 3.8 L Turbo V6	P	553	22
8	Pro-Am Cup	18	(Germany) Black Falcon	(Netherlands) Klaas Hummel (Luxembourg) Steve Jans (United Kingdom) Adam Christodoulou (Germany) Thomas Jäger	Mercedes-Benz SLS AMG GT3	P	551	14
8	Pro-Am Cup	18	(Germany) Black Falcon	(Netherlands) Klaas Hummel (Luxembourg) Steve Jans (United Kingdom) Adam Christodoulou (Germany) Thomas Jäger	Mercedes-Benz 6.2 L V8	P	551	14
9	Pro Cup	75	(Belgium) Prospeed Competition	(Germany) Marc Hennerici (Netherlands) Xavier Maassen (Belgium) Maxime Soulet	Porsche 997 GT3 R	P	550	23
9	Pro Cup	75	(Belgium) Prospeed Competition	(Germany) Marc Hennerici (Netherlands) Xavier Maassen (Belgium) Maxime Soulet	Porsche 4.0 L Flat-6	P	550	23
10	Pro-Am Cup	72	(Russia) SMP Racing	(Russia) Sergey Zlobin (Russia) Anton Ladygin (Italy) Fabio Babini (Italy) Luca Persiani	Ferrari 458 Italia GT3	P	547	
10	Pro-Am Cup	72	(Russia) SMP Racing	(Russia) Sergey Zlobin (Russia) Anton Ladygin (Italy) Fabio Babini (Italy) Luca Persiani	Ferrari 4.5 L V8	P	547	
11	Pro-Am Cup	83	(France) SMG Challenge	(France) Olivier Pla (France) Eric Clément (France) Nicolas Armindo (Austria) Robert Renauer	Porsche 997 GT3 R	P	545	38
11	Pro-Am Cup	83	(France) SMG Challenge	(France) Olivier Pla (France) Eric Clément (France) Nicolas Armindo (Austria) Robert Renauer	Porsche 4.0 L Flat-6	P	545	38
12	Pro-Am Cup	70	(Russia) SMP Racing	(Russia) Aleksey Basov (Russia) Alexander Skryabin (Italy) Alessandro Pier Guidi (Italy) Matteo Bobbi	Ferrari 458 Italia GT3	P	544	2
12	Pro-Am Cup	70	(Russia) SMP Racing	(Russia) Aleksey Basov (Russia) Alexander Skryabin (Italy) Alessandro Pier Guidi (Italy) Matteo Bobbi	Ferrari 4.5 L V8	P	544	2
13	Pro Cup	33	(France) Pro GT by Alméras	(Germany) Jörg Bergmeister (Germany) Timo Bernhard (France) Nicolas Lapierre	Porsche 997 GT3 R	P	543	26
13	Pro Cup	33	(France) Pro GT by Alméras	(Germany) Jörg Bergmeister (Germany) Timo Bernhard (France) Nicolas Lapierre	Porsche 4.0 L Flat-6	P	543	26
14	Pro Cup	69	(United Kingdom) Gulf Racing	(United Kingdom) Adam Carroll (Belgium) Nico Verdonck (United Kingdom) Rob Bell	McLaren MP4-12C GT3	P	542	33
14	Pro Cup	69	(United Kingdom) Gulf Racing	(United Kingdom) Adam Carroll (Belgium) Nico Verdonck (United Kingdom) Rob Bell	McLaren 3.8 L Turbo V8	P	542	33
15	Pro Cup	88	(New Zealand) Von Ryan Racing	(United Kingdom) Rob Barff (United Kingdom) Chris Goodwin (Brazil) Bruno Senna	McLaren MP4-12C GT3	P	540	28
15	Pro Cup	88	(New Zealand) Von Ryan Racing	(United Kingdom) Rob Barff (United Kingdom) Chris Goodwin (Brazil) Bruno Senna	McLaren 3.8 L Turbo V8	P	540	28
16	Gentleman; Trophy	20	(France) SOFREV Auto Sport Promotion	(France) Jean-Luc Blanchemain (France) Jean-Luc Beaubelique (France) Patrice Goueslard (Belgium) Frédéric Bouvy	Ferrari 458 Italia GT3	P	539	
16	Gentleman; Trophy	20	(France) SOFREV Auto Sport Promotion	(France) Jean-Luc Blanchemain (France) Jean-Luc Beaubelique (France) Patrice Goueslard (Belgium) Frédéric Bouvy	Ferrari 4.5 L V8	P	539	
17	Pro-Am Cup	73	(Russia) SMP Racing	(Russia) Devi Markozov (Russia) Mikhail Aleshin (Russia) Alexander Frolov (Russia) Daniil Move	Ferrari 458 Italia GT3	P	539	11
17	Pro-Am Cup	73	(Russia) SMP Racing	(Russia) Devi Markozov (Russia) Mikhail Aleshin (Russia) Alexander Frolov (Russia) Daniil Move	Ferrari 4.5 L V8	P	539	11
18	Gentleman; Trophy	52	(France) Sport Garage	(Italy) Leonardo Gorini (Belgium) Stéphane Lémeret (France) Thierry Prignaud (France) Romain Brandela	Ferrari 458 Italia GT3	P	537	34
18	Gentleman; Trophy	52	(France) Sport Garage	(Italy) Leonardo Gorini (Belgium) Stéphane Lémeret (France) Thierry Prignaud (France) Romain Brandela	Ferrari 4.5 L V8	P	537	34
19	Gentleman; Tropy	111	(Switzerland) Kessel Racing	(Venezuela) Pablo Paladino (Venezuela) Paolo Andreasi (Venezuela) Gaetano Ardagna Pérez (Italy) Giuseppe Cirò	Ferrari 458 Italia GT3	P	534	40
19	Gentleman; Tropy	111	(Switzerland) Kessel Racing	(Venezuela) Pablo Paladino (Venezuela) Paolo Andreasi (Venezuela) Gaetano Ardagna Pérez (Italy) Giuseppe Cirò	Ferrari 4.5 L V8	P	534	40
20	Pro Cup	44	(Switzerland) Kessel Racing	(Brazil) César Ramos (Italy) Davide Rigon (Italy) Daniel Zampieri	Ferrari 458 Italia GT3	P	528	25
20	Pro Cup	44	(Switzerland) Kessel Racing	(Brazil) César Ramos (Italy) Davide Rigon (Italy) Daniel Zampieri	Ferrari 4.5 L V8	P	528	25
21	Pro-Am Cup	98	(Switzerland) Fach Auto Tech	(Germany) Otto Klohs (Germany) Sebastian Asch (Germany) Jens Richter (Austria) Martin Ragginger	Porsche 997 GT3 R	P	526	
21	Pro-Am Cup	98	(Switzerland) Fach Auto Tech	(Germany) Otto Klohs (Germany) Sebastian Asch (Germany) Jens Richter (Austria) Martin Ragginger	Porsche 4.0 L Flat-6	P	526	
22	Pro Cup	26	(Germany) Vita4one Racing Team	(Belgium) Greg Franchi (Italy) Stefano Colombo (Germany) Frank Kechele	BMW Z4 GT3	P	525	18
22	Pro Cup	26	(Germany) Vita4one Racing Team	(Belgium) Greg Franchi (Italy) Stefano Colombo (Germany) Frank Kechele	BMW 4.4 L V8	P	525	18
23	Pro-Am Cup	99	(United Kingdom) Beechdean AMR	(United Kingdom) Andrew Howard (United Kingdom) Daniel McKenzie (United Kingdom) Jonathan Adam (Germany) Stefan Mücke	Aston Martin V12 Vantage GT3	P	524	1
23	Pro-Am Cup	99	(United Kingdom) Beechdean AMR	(United Kingdom) Andrew Howard (United Kingdom) Daniel McKenzie (United Kingdom) Jonathan Adam (Germany) Stefan Mücke	Aston Martin 6.0 L V12	P	524	1
24	Pro-Am Cup	19	(Germany) Black Falcon	(Ukraine) Andrii Lebed (Sweden) Andreas Simonsen (Russia) Sergey Afanasyev (Italy) Francesco Castellacci	Mercedes-Benz SLS AMG GT3	P	520	
24	Pro-Am Cup	19	(Germany) Black Falcon	(Ukraine) Andrii Lebed (Sweden) Andreas Simonsen (Russia) Sergey Afanasyev (Italy) Francesco Castellacci	Mercedes-Benz 6.2 L V8	P	520	
25	Gentleman; Trophy	53	(France) Sport Garage	(France) Philippe Marie (France) Gilles Duqueine (France) Jérôme Demay (Italy) Beniamino Caccia	Ferrari 458 Italia GT3	P	507	
25	Gentleman; Trophy	53	(France) Sport Garage	(France) Philippe Marie (France) Gilles Duqueine (France) Jérôme Demay (Italy) Beniamino Caccia	Ferrari 4.5 L V8	P	507	
26	Gentleman; Trophy	58	(Belgium) Delahaye Racing	(France) Daniel Desbruères (France) Marc Rostan (Belgium) Christian Kelders (Switzerland) Pierre Hirschi	Porsche 997 GT3 R	P	505	
26	Gentleman; Trophy	58	(Belgium) Delahaye Racing	(France) Daniel Desbruères (France) Marc Rostan (Belgium) Christian Kelders (Switzerland) Pierre Hirschi	Porsche 4.0 L Flat-6	P	505	
27	Pro Cup	23	(United Kingdom) JRM	(Germany) Lucas Luhr (United Kingdom) Steven Kane (United Kingdom) Peter Dumbreck	Nissan GT-R Nismo GT3	P	497	
27	Pro Cup	23	(United Kingdom) JRM	(Germany) Lucas Luhr (United Kingdom) Steven Kane (United Kingdom) Peter Dumbreck	Nissan 3.8 L Turbo V6	P	497	
28	Pro-Am Cup	34	(France) Pro GT by Alméras	(France) Eric Dermont (France) Franck Perera (France) Philippe Giauque (France) Morgan Moulin-Traffort	Porsche 997 GT3 R	P	495	19
28	Pro-Am Cup	34	(France) Pro GT by Alméras	(France) Eric Dermont (France) Franck Perera (France) Philippe Giauque (France) Morgan Moulin-Traffort	Porsche 4.0 L Flat-6	P	495	19
29	Gentleman; Trophy	48	(Belgium) Prospeed Competition	(Belgium) Didier Grandjean (Sweden) Carl Rosenblad (United Kingdom) Martin Rich (Netherlands) Mathijs Harkema	Porsche 997 GT3 Cup	P	488	
29	Gentleman; Trophy	48	(Belgium) Prospeed Competition	(Belgium) Didier Grandjean (Sweden) Carl Rosenblad (United Kingdom) Martin Rich (Netherlands) Mathijs Harkema	Porsche 3.8 L Flat-6	P	488	
30	Pro Cup	16	(Germany) Phoenix Racing	(Belgium) Enzo Ide (Belgium) Anthony Kumpen (Germany) Markus Winkelhock	Audi R8 LMS ultra	P	453	27
30	Pro Cup	16	(Germany) Phoenix Racing	(Belgium) Enzo Ide (Belgium) Anthony Kumpen (Germany) Markus Winkelhock	Audi 5.2 L V10	P	453	27
31	Pro Cup	62	(United Kingdom) Fortec Motorsport	(United Kingdom) Oliver Webb (United Kingdom) Alex Brundle (Austria) Karl Wendlinger	Mercedes-Benz SLS AMG GT3	P	449	37
31	Pro Cup	62	(United Kingdom) Fortec Motorsport	(United Kingdom) Oliver Webb (United Kingdom) Alex Brundle (Austria) Karl Wendlinger	Mercedes-Benz 6.2 L V8	P	449	37
32	Pro-Am Cup	50	(Italy) AF Corse	(Netherlands) Niek Hommerson (Belgium) Louis Machiels (Italy) Andrea Bertolini (Italy) Marco Cioci	Ferrari 458 Italia GT3	P	445	12
32	Pro-Am Cup	50	(Italy) AF Corse	(Netherlands) Niek Hommerson (Belgium) Louis Machiels (Italy) Andrea Bertolini (Italy) Marco Cioci	Ferrari 4.5 L V8	P	445	12
33	Gentleman; Trophy	94	(Belgium) Speed Lover	(Belgium) Jean-Michel Gerome (Belgium) Philippe Richard (Netherlands) Wim Moelde (Netherlands) Rik Renanms	Porsche 997 GT3 Cup	P	436	
33	Gentleman; Trophy	94	(Belgium) Speed Lover	(Belgium) Jean-Michel Gerome (Belgium) Philippe Richard (Netherlands) Wim Moelde (Netherlands) Rik Renanms	Porsche 3.8 L Flat-6	P	436	
34	Pro-Am Cup	17	(Denmark) Insight Racing with Flex Box	(United Kingdom) Ian Dockerill (Denmark) Dennis Andersen (Denmark) Martin Jensen	Ferrari 458 Italia GT3	P	422	
34	Pro-Am Cup	17	(Denmark) Insight Racing with Flex Box	(United Kingdom) Ian Dockerill (Denmark) Dennis Andersen (Denmark) Martin Jensen	Ferrari 4.5 L V8	P	422	
35	Pro Cup	911	(Belgium) Prospeed Competition	(Germany) Marco Holzer (United Kingdom) Nick Tandy (Italy) Marco Mapelli	Porsche 997 GT3 R	P	414	5
35	Pro Cup	911	(Belgium) Prospeed Competition	(Germany) Marco Holzer (United Kingdom) Nick Tandy (Italy) Marco Mapelli	Porsche 4.0 L Flat-6	P	414	5
DNF	Pro Cup	127	(Germany) Rowe Racing	(Germany) Jan Seyffarth (Germany) Lance David Arnold (Germany) Klaus Graf	Mercedes-Benz SLS AMG GT3	P	326	21
DNF	Pro Cup	127	(Germany) Rowe Racing	(Germany) Jan Seyffarth (Germany) Lance David Arnold (Germany) Klaus Graf	Mercedes-Benz 6.2 L V8	P	326	21
DNF	Gentleman; Trophy	22	(United Kingdom) Preci-Spark	(United Kingdom) Godfrey Jones (United Kingdom) David Jones (United Kingdom) Gareth Jones (United Kingdom) Philip Jones	Mercedes-Benz SLS AMG GT3	P	304	
DNF	Gentleman; Trophy	22	(United Kingdom) Preci-Spark	(United Kingdom) Godfrey Jones (United Kingdom) David Jones (United Kingdom) Gareth Jones (United Kingdom) Philip Jones	Mercedes-Benz 6.2 L V8	P	304	
DNF	Pro Cup	3	(Belgium) Marc VDS Racing Team	(Belgium) Bas Leinders (Netherlands) Yelmer Buurman (Belgium) Maxime Martin	BMW Z4 GT3	P	300	8
DNF	Pro Cup	3	(Belgium) Marc VDS Racing Team	(Belgium) Bas Leinders (Netherlands) Yelmer Buurman (Belgium) Maxime Martin	BMW 4.4 L V8	P	300	8
DNF	Pro-Am Cup	107	(France) Hexis Racing	(France) Olivier Panis (France) Laurent Cazanave (France) Côme Ledogar (France) Eric Debard	McLaren MP4-12C GT3	P	287	
DNF	Pro-Am Cup	107	(France) Hexis Racing	(France) Olivier Panis (France) Laurent Cazanave (France) Côme Ledogar (France) Eric Debard	McLaren 3.8 L Turbo V8	P	287	
DNF	Pro Cup	0	(Belgium) Team WRT	(Switzerland) Rahel Frey (New Zealand) Matt Halliday (Austria) Nikolaus Mayr-Melnhof	Audi R8 LMS ultra	P	270	35
DNF	Pro Cup	0	(Belgium) Team WRT	(Switzerland) Rahel Frey (New Zealand) Matt Halliday (Austria) Nikolaus Mayr-Melnhof	Audi 5.2 L V10	P	270	35
DNF	Pro-Am Cup	230	(United Kingdom) JRM	(United Arab Emirates) Humaid Al Masaood (United Kingdom) Charles Bateman (United Kingdom) Matt Bell (United Kingdom) Jody Fannin	Nissan GT-R Nismo GT3	P	268	
DNF	Pro-Am Cup	230	(United Kingdom) JRM	(United Arab Emirates) Humaid Al Masaood (United Kingdom) Charles Bateman (United Kingdom) Matt Bell (United Kingdom) Jody Fannin	Nissan 3.8 L Turbo V6	P	268	
DNF	Pro-Am Cup	12	(France) ART Grand Prix	(France) Yann Goudy (France) Gilles Vannelet (France) Grégoire Demoustier (France) Ulric Amado	McLaren MP4-12C GT3	P	238	36
DNF	Pro-Am Cup	12	(France) ART Grand Prix	(France) Yann Goudy (France) Gilles Vannelet (France) Grégoire Demoustier (France) Ulric Amado	McLaren 3.8 L Turbo V8	P	238	36
DNF	Pro Cup	4	(Belgium) Marc VDS Racing Team	(Finland) Markus Palttala (Switzerland) Henri Moser (Netherlands) Nick Catsburg	BMW Z4 GT3	P	222	4
DNF	Pro Cup	4	(Belgium) Marc VDS Racing Team	(Finland) Markus Palttala (Switzerland) Henri Moser (Netherlands) Nick Catsburg	BMW 4.4 L V8	P	222	4
DNF	Pro-Am Cup	9	(United Kingdom) Gulf Racing	(United Kingdom) Michael Wainwright (United Kingdom) Andy Meyrick (United Kingdom) Stuart Hall (United Kingdom) Tim Mullen	McLaren MP4-12C GT3	P	193	
DNF	Pro-Am Cup	9	(United Kingdom) Gulf Racing	(United Kingdom) Michael Wainwright (United Kingdom) Andy Meyrick (United Kingdom) Stuart Hall (United Kingdom) Tim Mullen	McLaren 3.8 L Turbo V8	P	193	
DNF	Gentleman; Trophy	57	(France) Sport Garage	(France) Wilfried Merafina (France) Pierre Perret (France) Manu Orgeval (France) Michaël Petit	Ferrari 458 Italia GT3	P	170	
DNF	Gentleman; Trophy	57	(France) Sport Garage	(France) Wilfried Merafina (France) Pierre Perret (France) Manu Orgeval (France) Michaël Petit	Ferrari 4.5 L V8	P	170	
DNF	Pro-Am Cup	25	(France) TDS Racing	(France) Henry Hassid (France) Ludovic Badey (France) Pierre Thiriet (Switzerland) Mathias Beche	BMW Z4 GT3	P	156	13
DNF	Pro-Am Cup	25	(France) TDS Racing	(France) Henry Hassid (France) Ludovic Badey (France) Pierre Thiriet (Switzerland) Mathias Beche	BMW 4.4 L V8	P	156	13
DNF	Pro-Am Cup	89	(Belgium) GPR AMR	(Belgium) Sarah Bovy (Belgium) Pierre Grivegnée (Belgium) Michael Schmetz (Belgium) Bert Redant	Aston Martin V12 Vantage GT3	P	155	
DNF	Pro-Am Cup	89	(Belgium) GPR AMR	(Belgium) Sarah Bovy (Belgium) Pierre Grivegnée (Belgium) Michael Schmetz (Belgium) Bert Redant	Aston Martin 6.0 L V12	P	155	
DNF	Pro Cup	13	(Belgium) Belgian Audi Club Team WRT	(Sweden) Edward Sandström (Sweden) Mattias Ekström (Switzerland) Marcel Fässler	Audi R8 LMS ultra	P	149	32
DNF	Pro Cup	13	(Belgium) Belgian Audi Club Team WRT	(Sweden) Edward Sandström (Sweden) Mattias Ekström (Switzerland) Marcel Fässler	Audi 5.2 L V10	P	149	32
DNF	Pro-Am Cup	43	(Italy) ROAL Motorsport	(Italy) Michela Cerruti (Italy) Stefano Comandini (Italy) Luca Rangoni	BMW Z4 GT3	P	137	39
DNF	Pro-Am Cup	43	(Italy) ROAL Motorsport	(Italy) Michela Cerruti (Italy) Stefano Comandini (Italy) Luca Rangoni	BMW 4.4 L V8	P	137	39
DNF	Gentleman; Trophy	49	(Italy) AF Corse	(France) Yannick Mollegol (France) Jean-Marc Bachelier (France) François Perrodo (United States) Howard Blank	Ferrari 458 Italia GT3	P	136	
DNF	Gentleman; Trophy	49	(Italy) AF Corse	(France) Yannick Mollegol (France) Jean-Marc Bachelier (France) François Perrodo (United States) Howard Blank	Ferrari 4.5 L V8	P	136	
DNF	Pro Cup	7	(France) Hexis Racing	(Netherlands) Stef Dusseldorp (United Kingdom) Alexander Sims (Portugal) Álvaro Parente	McLaren MP4-12C GT3	P	131	10
DNF	Pro Cup	7	(France) Hexis Racing	(Netherlands) Stef Dusseldorp (United Kingdom) Alexander Sims (Portugal) Álvaro Parente	McLaren 3.8 L Turbo V8	P	131	10
DNF	Pro-Am Cup	77	(Germany) MRS GT Racing	(Brazil) Carlos Kray (Austria) Philipp Eng (Venezuela) Justino Azcarate (Russia) Ilya Melnikov	McLaren MP4-12C GT3	P	121	
DNF	Pro-Am Cup	77	(Germany) MRS GT Racing	(Brazil) Carlos Kray (Austria) Philipp Eng (Venezuela) Justino Azcarate (Russia) Ilya Melnikov	McLaren 3.8 L Turbo V8	P	121	
DNF	Gentleman; Trophy	15	(Belgium) Boutsen Ginion	(Belgium) Christophe de Fierlant (France) Marlene Broggi (France) Laurent Pasquali (Saudi Arabia) Karim Ojjeh	McLaren MP4-12C GT3	P	96	
DNF	Gentleman; Trophy	15	(Belgium) Boutsen Ginion	(Belgium) Christophe de Fierlant (France) Marlene Broggi (France) Laurent Pasquali (Saudi Arabia) Karim Ojjeh	McLaren 3.8 L Turbo V8	P	96	
DNF	Pro-Am Cup	5	(Belgium) Boutsen Ginion	(Belgium) David Dermont (Belgium) Koen Wauters (Belgium) Frédéric Vervisch (France) Grégory Guilvert	McLaren MP4-12C GT3	P	93	
DNF	Pro-Am Cup	5	(Belgium) Boutsen Ginion	(Belgium) David Dermont (Belgium) Koen Wauters (Belgium) Frédéric Vervisch (France) Grégory Guilvert	McLaren 3.8 L Turbo V8	P	93	
DNF	Pro Cup	100	(Belgium) GPR AMR	(Belgium) Bertrand Baguette (United Kingdom) Darren Turner (United Kingdom) Jamie Campbell-Walter	Aston Martin V12 Vantage GT3	P	82	7
DNF	Pro Cup	100	(Belgium) GPR AMR	(Belgium) Bertrand Baguette (United Kingdom) Darren Turner (United Kingdom) Jamie Campbell-Walter	Aston Martin 6.0 L V12	P	82	7
DNF	Pro Cup	1	(Belgium) Belgian Audi Club Team WRT	(Monaco) Stéphane Ortelli (Belgium) Laurens Vanthoor (Germany) René Rast	Audi R8 LMS ultra	P	79	20
DNF	Pro Cup	1	(Belgium) Belgian Audi Club Team WRT	(Monaco) Stéphane Ortelli (Belgium) Laurens Vanthoor (Germany) René Rast	Audi 5.2 L V10	P	79	20
DNF	Pro-Am Cup	125	(United States) United Autosports	(South Africa) Mark Patterson (Hong Kong) Alan Li (United Kingdom) Will Bratt (United Kingdom) Glynn Geddie	Audi R8 LMS ultra	P	68	
DNF	Pro-Am Cup	125	(United States) United Autosports	(South Africa) Mark Patterson (Hong Kong) Alan Li (United Kingdom) Will Bratt (United Kingdom) Glynn Geddie	Audi 5.2 L V10	P	68	
DNF	Gentleman; Trophy	51	(Italy) AF Corse	(United Kingdom) Peter Mann (Portugal) Filipe Barrerios (Portugal) Francisco Guedes (France) Cédric Mézard	Ferrari 458 Italia GT3	P	67	
DNF	Gentleman; Trophy	51	(Italy) AF Corse	(United Kingdom) Peter Mann (Portugal) Filipe Barrerios (Portugal) Francisco Guedes (France) Cédric Mézard	Ferrari 4.5 L V8	P	67	
DNF	Pro Cup	14	(Belgium) Marc VDS Racing Team	(Germany) Dirk Müller (Germany) Jens Klingmann (Italy) Andrea Piccini	BMW Z4 GT3	P	60	24
DNF	Pro Cup	14	(Belgium) Marc VDS Racing Team	(Germany) Dirk Müller (Germany) Jens Klingmann (Italy) Andrea Piccini	BMW 4.4 L V8	P	60	24
DNF	Gentleman; Trophy	66	(Slovakia) ARC Bratislava	(Oman) Ahmad Al Harthy (Slovakia) Miro Konôpka (Slovakia) Jan Raska (Germany) Marco Schelp	Porsche 997 GT3 R	P	58	
DNF	Gentleman; Trophy	66	(Slovakia) ARC Bratislava	(Oman) Ahmad Al Harthy (Slovakia) Miro Konôpka (Slovakia) Jan Raska (Germany) Marco Schelp	Porsche 4.0 L Flat-6	P	58	
DNF	Pro-Am Cup	123	Team Ukraine	(Ukraine) Ruslan Tsyplakov (Ukraine) Andrii Kruglik (Italy) Raffaele Gianmaria (Italy) Matteo Malucelli	Ferrari 458 Italia GT3	P	56	16
DNF	Pro-Am Cup	123	Team Ukraine	(Ukraine) Ruslan Tsyplakov (Ukraine) Andrii Kruglik (Italy) Raffaele Gianmaria (Italy) Matteo Malucelli	Ferrari 4.5 L V8	P	56	16
DNF	Pro-Am Cup	24	(Switzerland) Blancpain Racing	(Switzerland) Marc Hayek (Netherlands) Peter Kox (Netherlands) Jos Menten (Netherlands) Henk Haane	Lamborghini Gallardo LP600+ GT3	P	28	
DNF	Pro-Am Cup	24	(Switzerland) Blancpain Racing	(Switzerland) Marc Hayek (Netherlands) Peter Kox (Netherlands) Jos Menten (Netherlands) Henk Haane	Lamborghini 5.2 L V10	P	28	
DNF	Pro Cup	11	(France) ART Grand Prix	(France) Antoine Leclerc (France) Mike Parisy (Spain) Andy Soucek	McLaren MP4-12C GT3	P	15	
DNF	Pro Cup	11	(France) ART Grand Prix	(France) Antoine Leclerc (France) Mike Parisy (Spain) Andy Soucek	McLaren 3.8 L Turbo V8	P	15	
DNF	Pro-Am Cup	32	(United Kingdom) Nissan GT Academy Team RJN	(Russia) Mark Shulzhitskiy (United States) Steve Doherty (United Kingdom) Alex Buncombe (United Kingdom) Chris Buncombe	Nissan GT-R Nismo GT3	P	12	15
DNF	Pro-Am Cup	32	(United Kingdom) Nissan GT Academy Team RJN	(Russia) Mark Shulzhitskiy (United States) Steve Doherty (United Kingdom) Alex Buncombe (United Kingdom) Chris Buncombe	Nissan 3.8 L Turbo V6	P	12	15
DNF	Pro-Am Cup	188	(Luxembourg) DKR Engineering	(Belgium) Bernard Delhez (Belgium) Michael Albert (France) Dimitri Enjalbert (Italy) Stefano Gattuso	BMW Z4 GT3	P	6	
DNF	Pro-Am Cup	188	(Luxembourg) DKR Engineering	(Belgium) Bernard Delhez (Belgium) Michael Albert (France) Dimitri Enjalbert (Italy) Stefano Gattuso	BMW 4.4 L V8	P	6	
DNS	Pro-Am Cup	80	(Switzerland) Emil Frey Racing	(Switzerland) Lorenz Frey (Switzerland) Gabriele Gardel (Switzerland) Fredy Barth	Aston Martin V12 Vantage GT3	P	–	
DNS	Pro-Am Cup	80	(Switzerland) Emil Frey Racing	(Switzerland) Lorenz Frey (Switzerland) Gabriele Gardel (Switzerland) Fredy Barth	Aston Martin 6.0 L V12	P	–	

== Support races ==
Lamborghini Super Trofeo, Cooper Tires British Formula 3 Championship, Formula Renault 2.0 Northern European Cup and Belgian Racing Car Championship + GT4 European Series.
