= Target Racing =

(Italy) Target Racing
- Founded: 1997
- Base: Lugo, Emilia-Romagna, Italy
- Team principal(s): Roberto Venieri
- Current series: Lamborghini Super Trofeo Europe
- Former series: Formula Chrysler Euroseries; Formula Renault 3.5 Series; Italian Formula Renault Championship; Italian Formula Three Championship; International GT Open; Italian F4 Championship; Blancpain GT Series; GT World Challenge Europe Endurance Cup
- Teams' Championships: Italian Formula Three Championship; 2002 2003 2009 2011; Lamborghini Europe; 2020
- Drivers' Championships: Italian Formula Three Championship; 2002: Miloš Pavlović; 2003: Fausto Ippoliti; 2009: Daniel Zampieri; 2011: Sergio Campana
- Website: http://www.targetracing.it/

Target Racing is a Formula Three auto racing team based in Italy and is sometimes known as BVM – Target Racing. The team also competes under Malta Formula Racing, Glorax Racing, F & M and Black Bull Swiss Racing entries.

== History ==
Target Racing was founded by Roberto Venieri in January 1997. It saw its debut in the same year, competing in the Italian Formula 3 and Formula 3 Federal Championships. The team continued there until 2002, the year in which the Ravenna team won the F3 Tricolor with Milos Pavlovic and the CSAI F3 Renault Monza Under 19 Trophy with Luca Persiani. A successful season in 2003 saw the confirmation of Target Racing at the top of Formula 3, with Fausto Ippoliti winning a second consecutive Italian title. The race took place in Pergusa, with Ippoliti winning and teammate Omar Galeffi coming in second place. The next year saw the Romagna team start with two Dallara 304-Opel entrusted to Alessandro Ciompi and Andrea Tiso. During the season, Ciompi switched teams, although not before he had secured a high pole position with Target. In 2005, Target launched the young Riccardo Azzoli from Lazio, alongside the Greek Elias Papalias. Azzoli achieved fourth place in the Tricolor F3. Papalias achieved sixth place in the same competition.

In 2006 the team elected to abandon the Dallara chassis, instead opting for the SLC chassis produced by the ATR Group. A conscious decision was made to seek to participate in more competitive races. Target again turned to Riccardo Azzoli, adding Salvatore Gatto, who had already competed in F.Azzurra with Target. The team was frustrated by budgetary constrains, and was not particularly successful. The team used cars built and designed by Dallara and Fiat in 2008. That year, the Ravenna team qualified for the Italian F3 championship with driver Salvatore Cicatelli, who had won the F3 Azzurra competition with a different team the previous year. Cicatelli won third place.

In 2009, media interest and participation in the F3 Tricolor series surged. Daniel Zampieri, debuting in F3 for the Ravenna team, won first place, with teammate Marco Zipoli coming in second. At the end of the season, Zampieri was chosen by Ferrari for the new driver program called Ferrari Driver Academy. In 2010, Brazilian driver César Ramos won the national championship. The Lugo team also won the Lamborghini Trophy in stock car racing, competing under the name of Black Bull.

In 2011, Target, still competing as BVM-Target Racing, entered the World Series Formula V8 3.5 with drivers Daniel Zampieri and Sergio Canamasas. Roberto Venieri's team focused on the preparation of the cars made by Dallara, leaving the management of the F.3 single-seater to the BVM headquarters, while continuing to deal with races with wheeled cars covered under the Black Bull signs. No longer Lamborghini Trophy, but Endurance races, with a Ferrari 430 with which she competed in the Blancpain GT and in the races organized by Peroni Promotions. In the World Series Renault, the team achieved results with the Spaniard Canamasas able to sign a pole position in Budapest and win places obtaining the eighth final place.

In 2012, the double commitment World Series Renault 3.5 continues as BVM Target and Blancpain Endurance GT as Black Bull. Drivers for the 3.5 series Italian Giovanni Venturini and The Russian Nikolay Martsenko. Immediately the points arrive, but after four appointments Venturini decides to leave the team. Venieri then relied on other drivers such as Sergey Sirotkin, Tamas Pal Kiss, Daniel Zampieri, Davide Rigon, always maintaining Martsenko's presence. At the end of the season, the decision for 2013 to leave the World Series Renault 3.5 to devote himself full time to the Black Bull project with the accession to the Blancpain Endurance GT, the GT Italia championship and the Coppa Italia races of Peroni Promotion employing two Ferrari 458s.

In 2013, Roberto Venieri's team competed in the Italian Gran Turismo GT3 Championship under the name of Black Bull Swiss Racing and there was no lack of satisfaction. He immediately finished second in the series with drivers Maino-Venturi. The following year, 2014, the return to formulas, precisely in the Italian Formula 4 training. The name of the team is Malta Formula Racing and once again Venieri's men stand out by taking second place with Mattia Drudi.

The presence in F4 continues in 2015 with the young Guzman and Kanayet, but alongside this program there is the return to the Gran Turismo world, precisely in the European Blancpain Endurance with birzhin-mancini-mastronardi drivers in three events: Monza, Le Castellet and Silverstone. The name of the team, Glorax.

The 2016 season was a challenging season for Lugo's team. In F4, under the insignia of DR Formula Racing, Raul Guzman took third place (also deploying Petrov and Wohlwend) while other satisfactions came from Gran Turismo: in the Italian GT3 championship, Black Bull Swiss Racing won the tricolor title with Gai-Venturi, but not only. The debut in the Lamborghini Super Trofeo Europa saw Venieri's team, under the insignia of Raton Racing, win the championship with Lind, also first in the Lamborghini Super Trofeo World Final.

In the wake of these successes, DR Formula continued in 2017 in the Italian F4 with Petrov, Braquinho and Festante while in the tricolor GT3 Gai-Rugolo-Venturi signed the second position, as occurred in the Lamborghini Super Trofeo Europe, where in the AM category Giannoni made its own the place of honor. At the end of the year, com Target Racing also took first place in the GTX class at the Abu Dhabi 12 Hours with Lammers-Sereethoranakul-Al Azhari drivers.

Another significant season for the team was that of 2018. In the Italian F4, as DR Formula, three drivers lined up: Petrov, Morricone and Toth. In the Blancpain Endurance, there was participation in the 24 Hours of Spa with the Folco-Costantini-Delhez-Debs crew, marathon finished in second place in class. With Di Folco-Costantini, Venieri's team also participated for the first time in the entire International GT Open championship. There was no lack of commitment in the Lamborghini Europa Super Trophy where Giannoni, Lind-Larsson, Boguslavsky-Shaitar were deployed in the various classes with sporadic appearances by Forné and Atoev.

2019 marked the exit from F4, but the commitment to the indoor wheel championships tripled. The year began with participation in the Dubai 24 Hours, as Target Racing, with Lind-Altoè-Boguslavsky-Herbst, crew that took fifth place in the Pro Am category. Target Racing then competed in the Lamborghini Middle East Super Trophy: in the Pro class came the absolute victory with Boguslavsky-Schandorff while in the Pro Am Larsson-Ohlsson they took third place. Wide participation in the Lamborghini Europe Super Trophy with Di Folco-Venditti, Giannoni, Vossos, Harkema-Bakker and Schandorff-Cecotto. This last pair of drivers took first place in the decisive World Final of the Lamborghini Super Trophy. Then there was the participation in the Blancpain Endurance GT3 as Raton Racing by Target and a well-deserved third-place finish obtained by Lenz-Costantini-Forné. Third place also as a team. And third place in class at the 24 Hours of Spa with Costantini-Forné-Di Folco. That's not all, because Raton Racing by Target raced in the International GT Open to take third place in the AM category with Liang-Giammaria. Another crew, Lenz-Di Folco while at a race began Perera.

== Former Series Results ==
=== Formula Renault 3.5 ===
Year	Car	Drivers	Races	Wins	Poles	F/Laps	Points	D.C.	T.C.
2011	Dallara T08-Renault	(Italy) Daniel Zampieri	17	0	0	0	28	16th	8th
2011	Dallara T08-Renault	(Spain) Sergio Canamasas	17	0	1	1	69	8th	8th
2012	Dallara T12-Renault	(Italy) Giovanni Venturini	7	0	0	0	3	25th	12th
2012	Dallara T12-Renault	(Russia) Sergey Sirotkin	2	0	0	0	0	35th	12th
2012	Dallara T12-Renault	(Italy) Daniel Zampieri	2	0	0	0	1	27th	12th
2012	Dallara T12-Renault	(Hungary) Tamás Pál Kiss	4	0	0	0	0	28th	12th
2012	Dallara T12-Renault	(Italy) Davide Rigon	2	0	0	0	0	33rd	12th
2012	Dallara T12-Renault	(Russia) Nikolay Martsenko	17	0	0	0	13	20th	12th

=== Italian Formula 4 ===
Year	Car	Entrant	Drivers	Races	Wins	Poles	F/Laps	Points	D.C.	T.C.
2014	Tatuus F4-T014-Abarth	F & M	(India) Mahaveer Raghunathan	18	0	0	0	45	12th	3rd
2014	Tatuus F4-T014-Abarth	F & M	(Italy) Mattia Drudi	21	4	1	4	237	2nd	3rd
2014	Tatuus F4-T014-Abarth	F & M	(Italy) Giovanni Altoè	15	0	0	0	1	24th	3rd
2014	Tatuus F4-T014-Abarth	Malta Formula Racing	(Malta) Keith Camilleri	15	0	0	0	NC	NC	11th
2014	Tatuus F4-T014-Abarth	Malta Formula Racing	(United States) Zackary Dante	15	0	0	0	12	19th	11th
2015	Tatuus F4-T014-Abarth	Malta Formula Racing	(Russia) Yan Leon Shlom	18	0	0	0	7	23rd	8th
2015	Tatuus F4-T014-Abarth	Malta Formula Racing	(Mexico) Raúl Guzmán	21	0	0	0	30	17th	8th
2015	Tatuus F4-T014-Abarth	Malta Formula Racing	(Colombia) Kevin Kanayet	21	1	0	0	41	15th	8th
2016	Tatuus F4-T014-Abarth	DR Formula	(Mexico) Raúl Guzmán	21	3	2	1	202	3rd	4th
2016	Tatuus F4-T014-Abarth	DR Formula	(Russia) Artem Petrov	21	0	0	1	0	NC†	4th
2016	Tatuus F4-T014-Abarth	DR Formula	(Liechtenstein) Fabienne Wohlwend	18	0	0	0	0	35th	4th
2017	Tatuus F4-T014-Abarth	DR Formula	(Russia) Artem Petrov	21	2	1	6	192	5th	4th
2017	Tatuus F4-T014-Abarth	DR Formula	(Italy) Aldo Festante	15	0	1	0	NC	NC	4th
2017	Tatuus F4-T014-Abarth	DR Formula	(Brazil) Felipe Branquinho	21	0	0	0	6	13th	4th
2018	Tatuus F4-T014-Abarth	DR Formula	(Italy) Edoardo Morricone	15	0	0	0	6	23rd	11th
2018	Tatuus F4-T014-Abarth	DR Formula	(Hungary) László Tóth	9	0	0	0	0	41st	11th

== Timeline ==
Current series
Lamborghini Super Trofeo Europe	2016–present
Former series
Italian Formula Three Championship	1997–2005, 2008–2012
Formula Chrysler Euroseries	2001
Italian Formula Renault Championship	2002–2009
German Formula Three Championship	2006
Formula Renault 3.5 Series	2011–2012
Blancpain GT Series Endurance Cup	2011–2012, 2015, 2018–2019
Italian GT Championship	2013, 2016–2017
Italian F4 Championship	2014–2018
International GT Open	2018–2019
GT2 European Series	2021–2022
