= Michael Dalle Stelle =

Italian racing driver

- Nationality: (Italy) Italian
- Born: 5 July 1990 (age 36)

Italian GT Championship career

Previous series
- 2008–09 2009 2008–09 2007: Italian Formula Three; Euroseries 3000; GP2 Asia Series; Formula Azzurra

Michael Dalle Stelle (born 5 July 1990) is an Italian former racing driver.

== Career ==
=== Formula Azzurra ===
Following a career in karting, Dalle Stelle graduated to formula racing in 2007 by taking part in the Formula Azzurra championship. Driving for the Corbetta Competizioni team, he finished seventh in the championship.

=== Formula Three ===
Dalle Stelle moved up to the Italian Formula Three Championship for 2008, where he finished ninth in the drivers' championship.

=== GP2 Series ===
Dalle Stelle was signed by the Durango team to take part in the 2008–09 GP2 Asia Series season from the second round of the championship. He replaced Carlos Iaconelli, and his team-mate was Davide Valsecchi.

== Racing record ==
=== Career summary ===
Season	Series	Team	Races	Wins	Poles	F/Laps	Podiums	Points	Position
2007	Formula Azzurra	Corbetta Competizioni	14	0	0	0	0	27	7th
2008	Italian Formula Three	Team Minardi by Corbetta	15	0	0	0	0	23	9th
2008–09	GP2 Asia Series	Durango	9	0	0	0	0	0	39th
2009	Italian Formula Three	Europa Corse	4	0	0	0	0	0	21st
2009	Euroseries 3000	Lazarus	2	0	0	0	0	1	17th

=== Complete GP2 Series results ===
==== Complete GP2 Asia Series results ====
(key) (Races in bold indicate pole position) (Races in italics indicate fastest lap)

Year	Entrant	1	2	3	4	5	6	7	8	9	10	11	12	DC	Points
2008–09	Durango	CHN; FEA	CHN; SPR	UAE; FEA; 17	UAE; SPR; C	BHR1; FEA; 19	BHR1; SPR; 20	QAT; FEA; 20	QAT; SPR; 22	MAL; FEA; 18	MAL; SPR; 20	BHR2; FEA; Ret	BHR2; SPR; 19	39th	0
