= Salvatore Gatto =

Italian racing driver

- Nationality: (Italy) Italian
- Born: 17 May 1984 (age 42) Termini Imerese (Italy)

Salvatore Gatto (born 17 May 1984 in Termini Imerese) is an Italian racing driver. He has competed in such series as International Formula Master and the Italian Formula Three Championship.
