= Marco Zipoli =

Italian racing driver

- Nationality: (Italy) Italian
- Born: 16 June 1990 (age 36) Genoa (Italy)

Italian Formula Three Championship career
- Current team: BVM - Target Racing
- Categorisation: FIA Silver (until 2026); FIA Bronze (2027–)
- Car number: 9

Marco Zipoli (born 16 June 1990 in Genoa) is an Italian racing driver. He has competed in such series as the Italian Formula Three Championship and was runner-up in 2009. He trialled for the Ferrari Formula One team in 2009.
