= Team Ghinzani =

Italian motor racing team

(Italy) Team Ghinzani
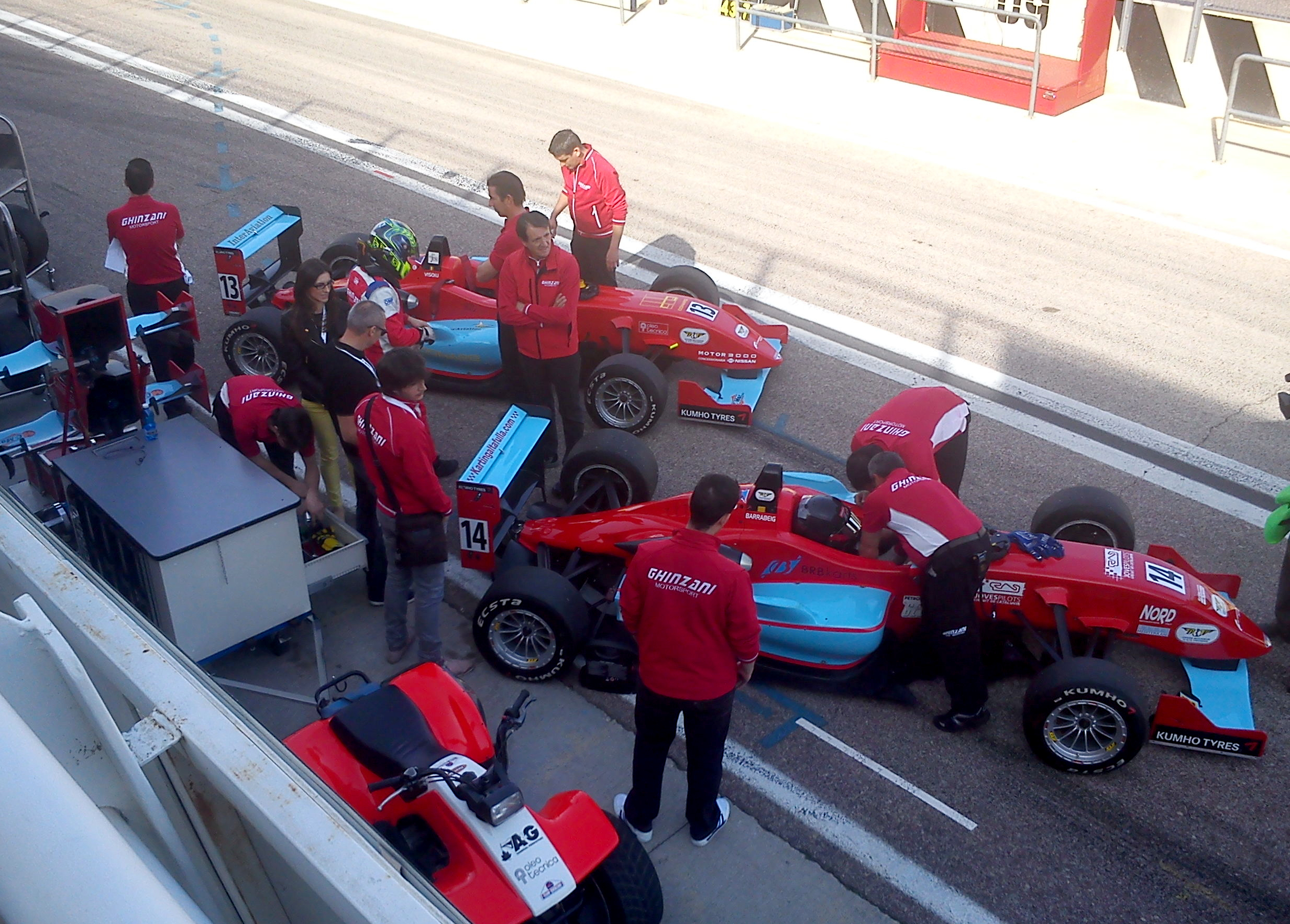
- Founded: 1992
- Team principal(s): Piercarlo Ghinzani
- Current series: Porsche Carrera Cup Italy; GT Cup Open Europe
- Former series: Formula Acceleration 1 Auto GP; Formula 3 Euro Series; German Formula 3 A1 Grand Prix; Italian Formula 3

Team Ghinzani is a motor racing team based in Italy, involved in many areas of motorsport. The team was founded in 1992 by Piercarlo Ghinzani, who raced in Formula One between 1981 and 1989.

== History ==
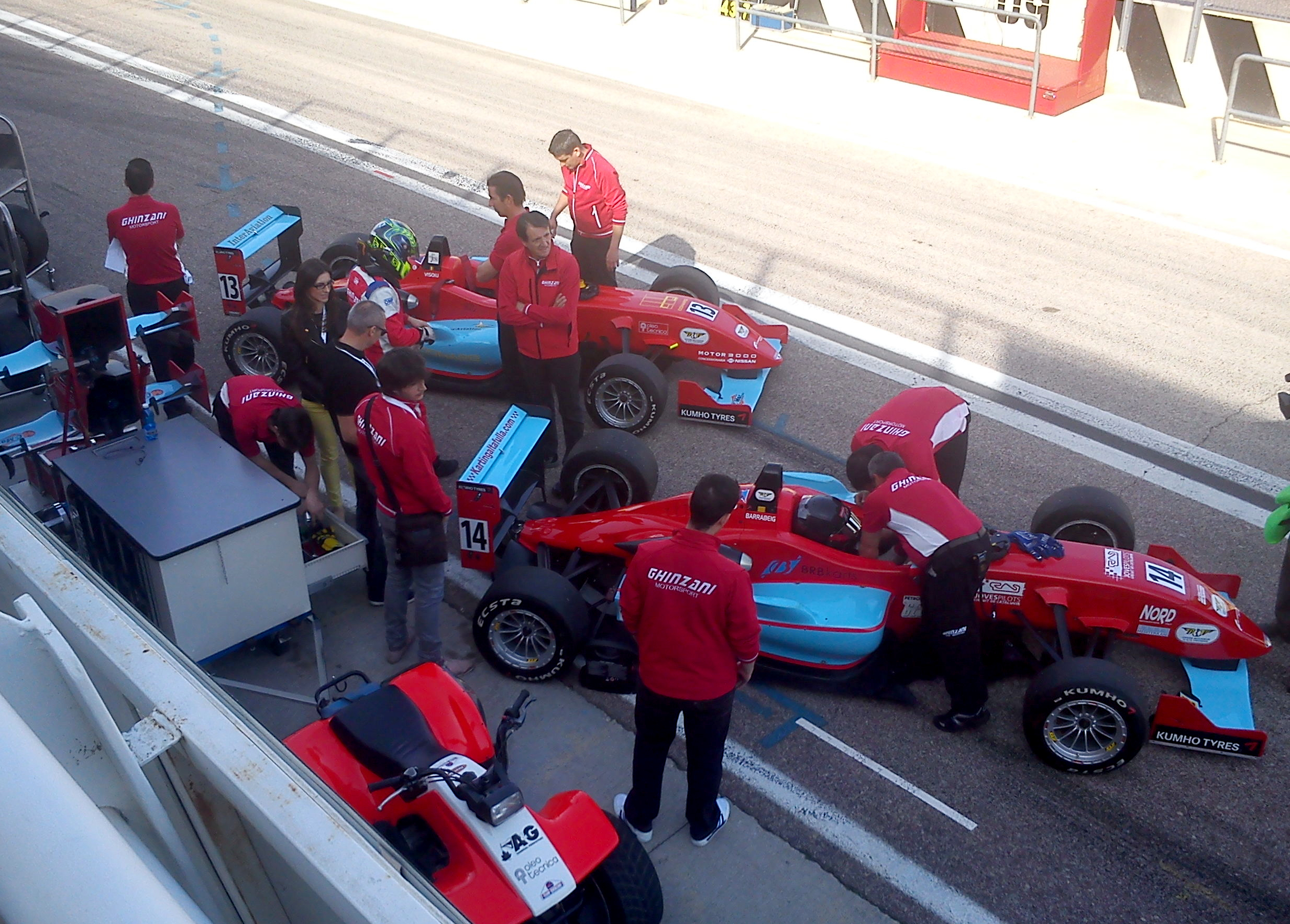
Team Ghinzani at 2012 Circuit Ricardo Tormo Italian F3 round.

Team Ghinzani have raced in Italian, German and Formula 3 Euro Series since 2000. Ghinzani entered Italian Formula 3000/Euro Formula 3000 between 1999 and 2002.

Since 2005–06 season, the outfit has managed A1 Team Italy in collaboration with Arco Motorsport, in the A1 Grand Prix series.

== Results ==
A1 Grand Prix Results
Year	Car	Team	Races	Wins	Poles	Fast laps	Points	T.C.
2005–06	Lola A1GP-Zytek	A1 Team Italy	22	0	0	0	46	14th
2006–07	Lola A1GP-Zytek	A1 Team Italy	22	1	0	0	52	7th
2007–08	Lola A1GP-Zytek	A1 Team Italy	20	0	0	0	12	18th
2008–09	A1GP-Ferrari	A1 Team Italy	14	0	1	0	17	16th

Italian/Euro Formula 3000 results
Year	Car	Drivers	Races	Wins	Poles	Fast laps	Points	D.C.	T.C.
1999	Lola T96/50-Zytek	(Italy) Paolo Ruberti	1	0	0	0	4	11th	9th
2000	Lola T96/50-Zytek	(Italy) Gabriele Varano	4	0	0	0	3	11th	10th
2000	Lola T96/50-Zytek	(Spain) Angel Burgueño	1	0	0	0	0	NC	10th
2000	Lola T96/50-Zytek	(Italy) Luca Vacis	8	0	0	0	0	NC	10th
2000	Lola T96/50-Zytek	(Sweden) Peter Sundberg	2	0	0	0	0	NC	10th
2001	Lola T96/50-Zytek	(Germany) Alexander Müller	8	0	0	0	26	3rd	4th
2001	Lola T96/50-Zytek	(Italy) Armin Pörnbacher	8	0	0	0	0	NC	4th
2002	Lola T99/50-Zytek	(Italy) Thomas Biagi	9	0	1	0	15	5th	6th
2002	Lola T99/50-Zytek	(Italy) Fabrizio del Monte	8	0	0	0	0	NC	6th

Italian Formula Three Championship results
Year	Car	Drivers	Races	Wins	Poles	Fast laps	Points	D.C.	T.C.
2002	Dallara F302-Mugen Honda	(Netherlands) Robert Doornbos	1	0	0	0	4	11th	7th
2002	Dallara F302-Mugen Honda	(Austria) Andreas Zuber	1	0	1	0	3	12th	7th
2002	Dallara F302-Mugen Honda	(Italy) Raffaele Giammaria	2	0	0	0	0	NC	7th
2003	Dallara F303-Mugen Honda	(Portugal) Alvaro Parente	2	1	1	1	34	9th	7th
2003	Dallara F303-Mugen Honda	(Austria) Philipp Baron	2	0	0	0	10	15th	7th
2003	Dallara F303-Mugen Honda	(Netherlands) Robert Doornbos	1	0	0	0	6	16th	7th
2004	Dallara F304-Mugen Honda	(Italy) Marco Bonanomi	2	2	2	0	86	6th	6th
2004	Dallara F304-Mugen Honda	(Germany) Daniel la Rosa	2	0	0	1	31	12th	6th
2004	Dallara F304-Mugen Honda	(Spain) Alvaro Barba Lopez	2	0	0	0	12	15th	6th
2005	Dallara F304-Mugen Honda	(Germany) Alexander Müller	12	6	3	5	171	2nd	2nd
2005	Dallara F304-Mugen Honda	(Spain) Marco Barba	2	0	0	0	18	10th	2nd
2005	Dallara F304-Mugen Honda	(Italy) Marco Cencetti	1	0	0	0	1	18th	2nd
2006	Dallara F304-Mugen Honda	(Italy) Michele Rugolo	16	2	1	0	78	4th	4th
2006	Dallara F304-Mugen Honda	(Italy) Manuele Maria Gatto	16	0	0	0	27	8th †	4th
2006	Dallara F304-Mugen Honda	(Italy) Paolo Bossini	4	0	0	0	0	NC	4th
2007	Dallara F304-Mugen Honda	(Italy) Giuseppe Termine	16	0	0	0	52	7th	4th
2007	Dallara F304-Mugen Honda	(Italy) Paulo Bossini	16	0	0	0	35	9th	4th

German Formula Three Championship results
Year	Car	Drivers	Races	Wins	Poles	Fast laps	Points	D.C.	T.C.
2000	Dallara F300-Mugen Honda	(Germany) Alexander Müller	20	4	2	2	181	2nd	3rd
2000	Dallara F300-Mugen Honda	(Sweden) Björn Wirdheim	19	0	0	0	38	14th	3rd
2001	Dallara F301-Mugen Honda	(Austria) Gottfried Grasser	17	0	0	0	8	28th	13th
2001	Dallara F301-Mugen Honda	(Italy) Fabrizio del Monte	17	0	0	0	1	30th	13th
2002	Dallara F302-Mugen Honda	(Belgium) Jeffrey van Hooydonk	18	1	0	0	31	5th	5th
2002	Dallara F302-Mugen Honda	(Netherlands) Robert Doornbos	18	0	0	0	17	11th	5th
2002	Dallara F302-Mugen Honda	(Austria) Gottfried Grasser	16	0	0	0	0	NC	5th

Formula 3 Euro Series results
Year	Car	Drivers	Races	Wins	Poles	Fast laps	Points	D.C.	T.C.
2003	Dallara F302-Mugen Honda	(Netherlands) Robert Doornbos	20	0	0	0	40	9th	7th
2003	Dallara F302-Mugen Honda	(Portugal) Álvaro Parente	20	0	0	0	1	25th	7th
2003	Dallara F302-Mugen Honda	(Austria) Philipp Baron	16	0	0	0	0	NC	7th
2004	Dallara F304-Mugen Honda	(Austria) Philipp Baron	20	0	0	0	0	NC	NC
2004	Dallara F304-Mugen Honda	(United Kingdom) Derek Hayes	2	0	0	0	0	NC	NC
2004	Dallara F304-Mugen Honda	(Italy) Marco Bonanomi	20	0	0	0	0	NC	NC

Formula Three Special races results
Year	Car	Race	Driver	Pole	Fast lap	Pos.
2002	Dallara F302-Mugen Honda	F3 Macau Grand Prix	(Netherlands) Robert Doornbos			6th
2002	Dallara F302-Mugen Honda	F3 Macau Grand Prix	(Spain) Marcel Costa			DNF
2002	Dallara F302-Mugen Honda	European F3 Cup	(Netherlands) Robert Doornbos			11th
2002	Dallara F302-Mugen Honda	F3 Korean Superprix	(Netherlands) Robert Doornbos			8th
2002	Dallara F302-Mugen Honda	F3 Korean Superprix	(Spain) Marcel Costa Lopez			29th
2003	Dallara F303-Mugen Honda	F3 Macau Grand Prix	(Netherlands) Robert Doornbos			DNF
2003	Dallara F303-Mugen Honda	F3 Macau Grand Prix	(Portugal) Álvaro Parente			DNF

- † These drivers also drove for other teams during the season and their final positions include all team results.
- D.C. = Drivers' Championship position, T.C. = Teams' Championship position.

== Timeline ==
	1990s								2000s										2010s
	92	93	94	95	96	97	98	99	00	01	02	03	04	05	06	07	08	09	10	11	12	13	14
Formulas								Italian/Euro F3000				Formula 3 Euro Series		A1 Grand Prix					Auto GP			Auto GP	FA1
Formulas									German F3
Formulas											Italian Formula 3
