= List of FIA Formula Two Championship drivers (2009–2012) =

This is a List of FIA Formula Two Championship drivers, that is, a list of drivers who have made at least one race start in the FIA Formula Two Championship (2009–2012). This list is accurate up to the end of the 2012 season.

== By name ==
Name	Nation	Seasons	Championship titles	Races (Starts)	Poles	Wins	Podiums	Fastest Laps	Points (Dropped points)
José Luis Abadín	Spain	2011–2012	0	12	0	0	0	0	1
Sergey Afanasyev	Russia	2010	0	18	1	0	4	1	157
Mikhail Aleshin	Russia	2009	0	16	1	1	5	0	59
Luciano Bacheta	United Kingdom	2011–2012	1 (2012)	20	3	5	10	5	249.5 (253.5)
Benjamin Bailly	Belgium	2010	0	18	1	1	3	0	130
René Binder	Austria	2011	0	2	0	0	0	0	0
Mirko Bortolotti	Italy	2009, 2011	1 (2011)	32	7	8	19	8	339 (366)
Will Bratt	United Kingdom	2010–2011	0	26	1	0	8	1	236
Alex Brundle	United Kingdom	2009, 2011	0	32	1	0	3	0	117
Samuele Buttarelli	Italy	2012	0	2	0	0	0	0	0
Mauro Calamia	Switzerland	2012	0	12	0	0	0	0	2
Jack Clarke	United Kingdom	2009–2011	0	50 (49)	0	1	3	1	197
Nicola de Marco	Italy	2009–2010	0	34	2	2	4	3	123
Armaan Ebrahim	India	2009–2011	0	46 (45)	0	0	1	0	101
Philipp Eng	Austria	2009–2010	0	34	3	4	7	1	181
Alex Fontana	Switzerland	2012	0	16	0	1	3	1	115
Natacha Gachnang	Switzerland	2009	0	16	0	0	0	0	2
Fabio Gamberini	Brazil	2011	0	2	0	0	0	0	0
Pietro Gandolfi	Italy	2009	0	16	0	0	0	0	0
Vittorio Ghirelli	Italy	2012	0	2	0	0	0	0	12
Tom Gladdis	United Kingdom	2009–2011	0	24	0	0	1	0	33
Richard Gonda	Slovakia	2012	0	2	0	0	0	0	4
Victor Guerin	Brazil	2012	0	2	0	0	0	0	2
Ollie Hancock	United Kingdom	2009	0	6	0	0	0	0	0
Tobias Hegewald	Germany	2009, 2011	0	32	4	2	5	3	158
Sebastian Hohenthal	Sweden	2009	0	16	0	0	0	0	7
Jens Höing	Germany	2009	0	16	0	0	0	0	0
Hector Hurst	United Kingdom	2012	0	16	0	0	0	0	27
Carlos Iaconelli	Brazil	2009	0	14	0	0	1	0	21
Axcil Jefferies	Zimbabwe	2012	0	12 (11)	0	0	0	0	17
Johan Jokinen	Denmark	2010	0	6	0	0	1	1	21
Julien Jousse	France	2009	0	16	1	1	4	2	49
Henri Karjalainen	Finland	2009	0	16	0	0	0	0	7
Kourosh Khani	Iran	2012	0	8	0	0	0	0	2
Jordan King	United Kingdom	2011	0	6	0	0	0	0	17
Natalia Kowalska	Poland	2010–2011	0	20	0	0	0	0	3
Plamen Kralev	Bulgaria	2010–2012	0	50 (49)	0	0	0	0	6
Ajith Kumar	India	2010	0	6	0	0	0	0	0
Jon Lancaster	United Kingdom	2011	0	2	0	0	0	0	14
Benjamin Lariche	France	2010–2011	0	34	0	0	0	0	48
Mikkel Mac	Denmark	2011	0	16	0	0	0	0	23
Mihai Marinescu	Romania	2010–2012	0	50	4	3	8	4	299
Daniel McKenzie	United Kingdom	2012	0	16	0	0	2	0	95
Kevin Mirocha	Poland	2012	0	16	1	1	6	0	159.5
Miki Monrás	Spain	2011	0	16	1	1	4	1	153
Jason Moore	United Kingdom	2009	0	16 (15)	0	0	0	0	3
Sung-Hak Mun	South Korea	2011	0	16 (15)	0	0	0	0	0
Jolyon Palmer	United Kingdom	2009–2010	0	34 (36)	5	5	10	3	245
Miloš Pavlović	Serbia	2009	0	16	0	0	2	1	29
Ramón Piñeiro	Spain	2010–2011	0	18	2	3	7	2	186
Markus Pommer	Germany	2012	0	16	4	3	5	2	169
Edoardo Piscopo	Italy	2009	0	14	0	0	0	0	19
Paul Rees	United Kingdom	2010	0	8	0	0	0	0	18
Ivan Samarin	Russia	2010	0	18	0	0	0	0	64
Germán Sánchez	Spain	2009	0	16 (14)	0	0	0	0	2
Harald Schlegelmilch	Latvia	2012	0	2	0	0	0	0	12
Max Snegirev	Russia	2011–2012	0	28	0	0	0	0	20
Kelvin Snoeks	Netherlands	2010–2011	0	32	0	0	1	0	88
Andy Soucek	Spain	2009	1 (2009)	16	2	7	11	3	115
Dean Stoneman	United Kingdom	2010	1 (2010)	18	6	6	13	6	284
Thiemo Storz	Germany	2011	0	16	0	0	0	0	19
Parthiva Sureshwaren	India	2010–2012	0	32 (31)	0	0	0	0	1
Henry Surtees	United Kingdom	2009	0	8	1	0	1	0	8
Ricardo Teixeira	Angola	2010	0	18	0	0	0	0	23
Johannes Theobald	Germany	2010–2011	0	14	0	0	0	0	1
Julian Theobald	Germany	2010–2011	0	18	0	0	0	0	8
Mathéo Tuscher	Switzerland	2012	0	16	4	2	9	1	210
Tristan Vautier	France	2009	0	2	0	0	1	0	9
Kazim Vasiliauskas	Lithuania	2009–2010	0	34	3	2	10	4	198
Robert Wickens	Canada	2009	0	16	5	2	6	3	64
Dino Zamparelli	United Kingdom	2012	0	16	0	0	2	0	106.5
Christopher Zanella	Switzerland	2011–2012	0	32	3	4	14	5	385 (401)
David Zhu	China	2012	0	16	0	0	0	0	22

== By nationality ==
Country	Total Drivers	Champions	Championships	First driver(s)	Last driver(s)
Angola	1	0	0	Ricardo Teixeira (2010)	Ricardo Teixeira (2010)
Austria	2	0	0	Philipp Eng (2009)	René Binder (2011)
Belgium	1	0	0	Benjamin Bailly (2010)	Benjamin Bailly (2010)
Brazil	3	0	0	Carlos Iaconelli (2009)	Victor Guerin (2012)
Bulgaria	1	0	0	Plamen Kralev (2010)	Plamen Kralev (2012)
Canada	1	0	0	Robert Wickens (2009)	Robert Wickens (2009)
China	1	0	0	David Zhu (2012)	David Zhu (2012)
Denmark	2	0	0	Johan Jokinen (2010)	Mikkel Mac (2011)
Finland	1	0	0	Henri Karjalainen (2009)	Henri Karjalainen (2009)
France	3	0	0	Julien Jousse, Tristan Vautier (2009)	Benjamin Lariche (2011)
Germany	6	0	0	Tobias Hegewald, Jens Höing (2009)	Markus Pommer (2012)
India	3	0	0	Armaan Ebrahim (2009)	Parthiva Sureshwaren (2012)
Iran	1	0	0	Kourosh Khani (2012)	Kourosh Khani (2012)
Italy	6	1 (Bortolotti)	1 (2011)	Mirko Bortolotti, Pietro Gandolfi, Nicola de Marco, Edoardo Piscopo (2009)	Samuele Buttarelli, Vittorio Ghirelli (2012)
Latvia	1	0	0	Harald Schlegelmilch (2012)	Harald Schlegelmilch (2012)
Lithuania	1	0	0	Kazim Vasiliauskas (2009)	Kazim Vasiliauskas (2010)
Netherlands	1	0	0	Kelvin Snoeks (2010)	Kelvin Snoeks (2011)
Poland	2	0	0	Natalia Kowalska (2010)	Kevin Mirocha (2012)
Romania	1	0	0	Mihai Marinescu (2010)	Mihai Marinescu (2012)
Russia	4	0	0	Mikhail Aleshin (2009)	Max Snegirev (2012)
Serbia	1	0	0	Miloš Pavlović (2009)	Miloš Pavlović (2009)
Slovakia	1	0	0	Richard Gonda (2012)	Richard Gonda (2012)
South Korea	1	0	0	Sung-Hak Mun (2011)	Sung-Hak Mun (2011)
Spain	7	1 (Soucek)	1 (2009)	Germán Sánchez, Andy Soucek (2009)	José Luis Abadín, Miki Monrás, Ramón Piñeiro (2011)
Sweden	1	0	0	Sebastian Hohenthal (2009)	Sebastian Hohenthal (2009)
Switzerland	5	0	0	Natacha Gachnang (2009)	Mauro Calamia, Alex Fontana, Mathéo Tuscher, Christopher Zanella (2012)
United Kingdom	16	2 (Stoneman Bacheta)	2 (2010, 2012)	Alex Brundle, Jack Clarke, Tom Gladdis, Ollie Hancock, Jason Moore, Jolyon Palmer, Henry Surtees (2009)	Luciano Bacheta, Hector Hurst, Daniel McKenzie, Dino Zamparelli (2012)
Zimbabwe	1	0	0	Axcil Jefferies (2012)	Axcil Jefferies (2012)
