= 2008 Formula Renault 2.0 Italia =

Motor racing competition

Seasons
- ← 2007 2009 →

The 2008 Formula Renault 2.0 Italia was the ninth season of the Formula Renault 2.0 Italia series. It was won by Pål Varhaug driving for Jenzer Motorsport.

Daniel Mancinelli would win the winter series driving for It Loox Racing Car.

== Drivers and Teams ==
2008 Entry List
| Team | No. | Driver name | Rounds |
|---|---|---|---|
| (Italy) CO2 Motorsport | 2 | (Italy) Federico Rossi | 1-2 |
| (Italy) CO2 Motorsport | 4 | (Italy) Sergio Campana | All |
| (Italy) CO2 Motorsport | 56 | (Italy) Alberto Bassi | 7 |
| (Italy) Cram Competition | 3 | (Spain) Genis Olivé | All |
| (Italy) Cram Competition | 6 | (Canada) Tyler Dueck | All |
| (Italy) Cram Competition | 30 | (Italy) Alessandro Kouzkin | All |
| (Italy) Cram Competition | 31 | (Italy) Samuele Buttarelli | 1-5 |
| (Italy) RP Motorsport | 5 | (San Marino) Nicola Zonzini | 1-5 |
| (Italy) RP Motorsport | 12 | (Argentina) Augusto Scalbi | 7 |
| (Italy) RP Motorsport | 18 | (Finland) Jesse Krohn | 6-7 |
| (Italy) RP Motorsport | 21 | (Italy) David Fumanelli | 1-6 |
| (Italy) RP Motorsport | 81 | (Italy) Stefano Bizzarri | 1-5 |
| (San Marino) W&D Racing | 7 | (San Marino) Paolo Meloni | All |
| (Italy) Tomcat Racing | 8 | (Italy) Riccardo Cinti | 1-4, 6-7 |
| (Italy) Tomcat Racing | 11 | (Italy) Andrea Roda | All |
| (Italy) IT Loox Racing Car | 10 | (Italy) Marco Betti | All |
| (Italy) IT Loox Racing Car | 23 | (Italy) Niki Sebastiani | All |
| (Italy) Facondini Racing | 15 | (Germany) Patrick Kronenberger | All |
| (Italy) Prema Powerteam | 16 | (Colombia) Carlos Muñoz | All |
| (Italy) Prema Powerteam | 17 | (Lithuania) Kazim Vasiliauskas | 1-2, 6-7 |
| (Italy) Prema Powerteam | 37 | (Sweden) Felix Rosenqvist | 4 |
| (Italy) Prema Powerteam | 38 | (Italy) Patrick Reiterer | All |
| (Netherlands) Van Amersfoort Racing | 19 | (Netherlands) Nigel Melker | 1-3, 5-6 |
| (Netherlands) Van Amersfoort Racing | 20 | (Netherlands) Stef Dusseldorp | 1-3, 5-7 |
| (Italy) BVM Minardi Team | 24 | (Italy) Daniel Zampieri | All |
| (Italy) BVM Minardi Team | 25 | (Brazil) César Ramos | All |
| (Italy) BVM Minardi Team | 26 | (United Kingdom) Adrian Quaife-Hobbs | All |
| (Switzerland) Jenzer Motorsport | 27 | (Italy) Michele Faccin | All |
| (Switzerland) Jenzer Motorsport | 28 | (Norway) Pål Varhaug | All |
| (Switzerland) Jenzer Motorsport | 29 | (Spain) Siso Cunill | 1-5 |
| (Switzerland) Jenzer Motorsport 2 | 67 | (Switzerland) Nico Müller | 4-5 |
| (Switzerland) Jenzer Motorsport 2 | 68 | (Switzerland) Fabien Thuner | 4 |
| (Switzerland) Jenzer Motorsport 2 | 69 | (Switzerland) Simon Trummer | 4-6 |
| (Italy) Paragon Motorsports | 33 | (Italy) Daniel Mancinelli | 5-7 |
| (Italy) Team Dueppì | 47 | (Switzerland) Stefano Comini | All |
| (Italy) Team Dueppì | 87 | (Italy) Andrea Borio | 1-6 |
| (Italy) BVE Racing Team | 74 | (Italy) Alberto Cola | 7 |

== Calendar ==
| Round | Race | Circuit | Date | Pole position | Fastest lap | Winning driver | Winning team |
|---|---|---|---|---|---|---|---|
| 1 | R1 | (Italy) ACI Vallelunga Circuit | April 12 | (Italy) Michele Faccin | (Italy) Niki Sebastiani | (Italy) Niki Sebastiani | (Italy) IT Loox Racing Car |
| 1 | R2 | (Italy) ACI Vallelunga Circuit | April 13 | (Italy) Niki Sebastiani | (Italy) Michele Faccin | (Italy) Michele Faccin | (Switzerland) Jenzer Motorsport |
| 2 | R1 | (Hungary) Hungaroring | May 11 | (Norway) Pål Varhaug | (Italy) Niki Sebastiani | (Norway) Pål Varhaug | (Switzerland) Jenzer Motorsport |
| 2 | R2 | (Hungary) Hungaroring | May 11 | (Norway) Pål Varhaug | (United Kingdom) Adrian Quaife-Hobbs | (Norway) Pål Varhaug | (Switzerland) Jenzer Motorsport |
| 3 | R1 | (Czech Republic) Masaryk Circuit | May 24 | (Germany) Patrick Kronenberger | (Norway) Pål Varhaug | (Norway) Pål Varhaug | (Switzerland) Jenzer Motorsport |
| 3 | R2 | (Czech Republic) Masaryk Circuit | May 25 | (Germany) Patrick Kronenberger | (Germany) Patrick Kronenberger | (Germany) Patrick Kronenberger | (Italy) Facondini Racing |
| 4 | R1 | (Belgium) Circuit de Spa-Francorchamps | May 31 | (Italy) Michele Faccin | (Italy) Michele Faccin | (Italy) Michele Faccin | (Switzerland) Jenzer Motorsport |
| 4 | R2 | (Belgium) Circuit de Spa-Francorchamps | June 1 | (Italy) Michele Faccin | (Italy) Michele Faccin | (Italy) Michele Faccin | (Switzerland) Jenzer Motorsport |
| 5 | R1 | (Italy) Misano World Circuit | July 19 | (Norway) Pål Varhaug | (Brazil) César Ramos | (Italy) Sergio Campana | (Italy) CO2 Motorsport |
| 5 | R2 | (Italy) Misano World Circuit | July 20 | (Italy) Sergio Campana | (Brazil) César Ramos | (Italy) Sergio Campana | (Italy) CO2 Motorsport |
| 6 | R1 | (Italy) Mugello Circuit | September 13 | (Italy) Michele Faccin | (Italy) Michele Faccin | (Italy) Daniel Mancinelli | (Italy) Paragon Motorsports |
| 6 | R2 | (Italy) Mugello Circuit | September 14 | (Italy) Daniel Mancinelli | (Germany) Patrick Kronenberger | (Germany) Patrick Kronenberger | (Italy) Facondini Racing |
| 7 | R1 | (Italy) Autodromo Nazionale Monza | October 11 | (Brazil) César Ramos | (Italy) Sergio Campana | (Spain) Genis Olivé | (Italy) Cram Competition |
| 7 | R2 | (Italy) Autodromo Nazionale Monza | October 12 | (Brazil) César Ramos | (Italy) Sergio Campana | (Italy) Sergio Campana | (Italy) CO2 Motorsport |

== Championship standings ==
Each championship round included 2 or 3 races by rounds length of 30 minutes each. Points were awarded as follows:

| Position | 1st | 2nd | 3rd | 4th | 5th | 6th | 7th | 8th | 9th | 10th | 11th | 12th | 13th | 14th | 15th |
|---|---|---|---|---|---|---|---|---|---|---|---|---|---|---|---|
| Points | 32 | 28 | 24 | 22 | 20 | 18 | 16 | 14 | 12 | 10 | 8 | 6 | 4 | 2 | 1 |

In each race, 2 additional points were awarded for pole position, and 2 for fastest lap.

=== Drivers ===
| Pos | Driver | (Italy) VLL | | (Hungary) HUN | | (Czech Republic) BRN | | (Belgium) SPA | | (Italy) MIS | | (Italy) MUG | | (Italy) MNZ | | Points |
| Pos | Driver | 1 | 2 | 3 | 4 | 5 | 6 | 7 | 8 | 9 | 10 | 11 | 12 | 13 | 14 | Points |
|---|---|---|---|---|---|---|---|---|---|---|---|---|---|---|---|---|
| 1 | (Norway) Pål Varhaug | 5 | 4 | 1 | 1 | 1 | 5 | 2 | 5 | 12 | 2 | 7 | 5 | 5 | 3 | 330 |
| 2 | (Italy) Michele Faccin | 4 | 1 | 9 | 8 | 15 | 6 | 1 | 1 | Ret | 8 | 3 | 11 | 4 | 5 | 271 |
| 3 | (Italy) Niki Sebastiani | 1 | Ret | 3 | 3 | 2 | 2 | 3 | 3 | 20 | 3 | 6 | 9 | 10 | 8 | 270 |
| 4 | (United Kingdom) Adrian Quaife-Hobbs | 16 | 2 | 5 | 4 | 3 | 3 | 5 | 4 | 11 | 6 | 2 | 4 | 11 | Ret | 250 |
| 5 | (Italy) Sergio Campana | 6 | 19 | 22 | 9 | 12 | 4 | Ret | 2 | 1 | 1 | 5 | Ret | 2 | 1 | 238 |
| 6 | (Brazil) César Ramos | 3 | Ret | 2 | 2 | 7 | 7 | 4 | 13 | 23 | 4 | 4 | Ret | 3 | 19 | 216 |
| 7 | (Germany) Patrick Kronenberger | 7 | 5 | 6 | 22 | DSQ | 1 | 8 | 10 | Ret | 5 | 15 | 1 | 9 | 9 | 196 |
| 8 | (Spain) Genís Olivé | 11 | 8 | 4 | 5 | 16 | 23 | 10 | 11 | 4 | 26 | 12 | 12 | 1 | 2 | 178 |
| 9 | (Italy) Daniel Zampieri | 2 | 13 | 8 | 6 | 17 | 20 | Ret | 6 | 8 | 10 | 11 | 3 | 6 | DNS | 158 |
| 10 | (Netherlands) Stef Dusseldorp | 14 | 15 | 7 | 7 | 6 | 9 | | | 16 | 18 | 14 | 6 | Ret | 4 | 125 |
| 11 | (Italy) Patrick Reiterer | 23 | 14 | 11 | 13 | 4 | 15 | 7 | 8 | 2 | 9 | Ret | 14 | Ret | Ret | 109 |
| 12 | (Italy) Riccardo Cinti | 8 | 3 | 21 | 11 | Ret | 12 | 9 | 9 | | | 10 | 17 | 12 | 10 | 104 |
| 13 | (Spain) Siso Cunill | 10 | 7 | Ret | Ret | 13 | 11 | 6 | 7 | 6 | 12 | | | | | 96 |
| 14 | (Italy) Alessandro Kouzkin | 17 | 20 | 10 | Ret | 8 | 8 | 22 | 20 | 3 | 11 | 18 | Ret | Ret | 12 | 76 |
| 15 | (Italy) Daniel Mancinelli | | | | | | | | | 5 | 14 | 1 | 2 | 8 | Ret | 66 |
| 16 | (Colombia) Carlos Muñoz | 13 | 18 | Ret | Ret | 14 | 10 | | | 17 | 7 | 22 | 19 | 7 | 6 | 66 |
| 17 | (Italy) Stefano Comini | 12 | Ret | 17 | 17 | Ret | 21 | 20 | 21 | 16 | 15 | 9 | 10 | Ret | 7 | 47 |
| 18 | (Netherlands) Nigel Melker | 21 | Ret | 16 | 15 | 5 | 16 | | | 22 | 19 | Ret | 7 | | | 37 |
| 19 | (Italy) Marco Betti | Ret | 10 | Ret | 20 | Ret | 22 | 14 | 14 | 24 | 17 | 8 | 13 | 20 | Ret | 34 |
| 20 | (San Marino) Paolo Meloni | Ret | Ret | 13 | 16 | 10 | 19 | 19 | 23 | 9 | Ret | 18 | 18 | 13 | 13 | 34 |
| 21 | (Lithuania) Kazim Vasiliauskas | 18 | 9 | 5 | Ret | | | | | | | 21 | 8 | 14 | 15 | 30 |
| 22 | (Italy) Federico Rossi | Ret | 6 | Ret | 10 | | | | | | | | | | | 28 |
| 23 | (Italy) Andrea Borio | Ret | 11 | Ret | 21 | 11 | 25 | 23 | Ret | 14 | 22 | 13 | 16 | | | 24 |
| 24 | (Italy) Stefano Bizzarri | 9 | Ret | 20 | 14 | 18 | 13 | 15 | 18 | 21 | 16 | | | | | 19 |
| 25 | (Italy) David Fumanelli | 22 | 12 | 12 | Ret | Ret | 14 | 18 | 26 | 19 | Ret | 19 | 20 | | | 14 |
| 26 | (Italy) Andrea Roda | 19 | 16 | 19 | 18 | 9 | 17 | 25 | 25 | 15 | 21 | Ret | Ret | 18 | 17 | 13 |
| 27 | (Canada) Tyler Dueck | 20 | 17 | 15 | 12 | Ret | 18 | 24 | 19 | 18 | 25 | 16 | 15 | 15 | 18 | 11 |
| 28 | (Italy) Samuele Buttarelli | 24 | Ret | 18 | Ret | 20 | Ret | 16 | 24 | 10 | 20 | | | | | 10 |
| 29 | (Switzerland) Fabien Thuner | | | | | | | 13 | 12 | | | | | | | 10 |
| 30 | (San Marino) Nicola Zonzini | 15 | Ret | Ret | 19 | 19 | 24 | 11 | 17 | 25 | 24 | | | | | 9 |
| 31 | (Italy) Alberto Cola | | | | | | | | | | | | | DNS | 11 | 8 |
| 32 | (Switzerland) Nico Müller | | | | | | | 17 | 16 | 13 | 13 | | | | | 8 |
| 33 | (Switzerland) Simon Trummer | | | | | | | 12 | 15 | 26 | 23 | Ret | Ret | | | 7 |
| 34 | (Finland) Jesse Krohn | | | | | | | | | | | 17 | Ret | 16 | 14 | 2 |
| 35 | (Argentina) Augusto Scalbi | | | | | | | | | | | | | 17 | 16 | 0 |
| 36 | (Italy) Alberto Bassi | | | | | | | | | | | | | 19 | Ret | 0 |
| 37 | (Sweden) Felix Rosenqvist | | | | | | | 21 | 22 | | | | | | | 0 |

=== Teams ===
| Pos | Team | Points |
|---|---|---|
| 1 | (Switzerland) Jenzer Motorsport | 515 |
| 2 | (Italy) BVM Minardi Team | 384 |
| 3 | (Italy) It Loox Racing Car | 280 |
| 4 | (Italy) CO2 Motorsport | 227 |
| 5 | (Italy) Cram Competition | 188 |
| 6 | (Italy) Facondini Racing | 172 |
| 7 | (Italy) Prema Powerteam | 155 |
| 8 | (Netherlands) van Amersfoort Racing | 140 |
| 9 | (Italy) Tomcat Racing | 101 |
| 10 | (Italy) Team Dueppì | 82 |
| 11 | (Italy) RP Motorsport | 28 |
| 12 | (San Marino) W&D Racing | 26 |
| 13 | (Switzerland) Jenzer Motorsport 2 | 25 |
| 14 | (Italy) AP Motorsport | 0 |
| 15 | (Italy) Line Race Technology | 0 |
| 16 | (Italy) Emmebi Motorsport | 0 |
| 17 | (Italy) Antonino Racing | 0 |
| 18 | (Italy) Team BVE | 0 |

== Winter Series ==
Race point system
| Position | 1st | 2nd | 3rd | 4th | 5th | 6th | 7th | 8th | 9th | 10th | 11th | 12th | 13th | 14th | 15th |
| Points | 32 | 28 | 24 | 22 | 20 | 18 | 16 | 14 | 12 | 10 | 8 | 6 | 4 | 2 | 1 |

2 points are awarded to the fastest driver in each lap and 4 points to the pole position holder.

| Pos | Driver | Team | (Italy) Imola Nov 2 | | Points |
| Pos | Driver | Team | 1 | 2 | Points |
|---|---|---|---|---|---|
| 1 | (Italy) Daniel Mancinelli | It Loox Racing Car | 1 | 5 | 58 |
| 2 | (Lithuania) Kazim Vasiliauskas | CO2 Motorsport | 5 | 1 | 54 |
| 3 | (Switzerland) Nico Müller | Jenzer Motorsport | 3 | 2 | 52 |
| 4 | (Spain) Genis Olive | Cram Competition | 4 | 3 | 46 |
| 5 | (Italy) Daniel Zampieri | BVM Minardi Team | 2 | 7 | 44 |
| 6 | (Italy) Federico Scionti | Tomcat Racing | 6 | 8 | 32 |
| 7 | (Germany) Thiemo Storz | CO2 Motorsport | 7 | 11 | 24 |
| 8 | (Colombia) Carlos Muñoz | Jenzer Motorsport | Ret | 4 | 22 |
| 9 | (Czech Republic) Tomas Pivoda | Jenzer Motorsport | 9 | 10 | 22 |
| 10 | (Brazil) Adriano Buzaid | BVM Minardi Team | Ret | 6 | 18 |
| 11 | (Italy) Andrea Amici | Viola Formula Racing | 8 | Ret | 14 |
| 12 | (Netherlands) Frank Suntjens | Co2 Motorsport | Ret | 9 | 12 |
