= 2007 Formula Renault 2.0 Italia =

Motor racing competition

Seasons
- ← 2006 2008 →

The 2007 Formula Renault 2.0 Italia was the eighth season of the Formula Renault 2.0 Italia series. The trio of Epsilon Red Bull Team drivers would dominate the season between them with Mika Mäki winning over Jaime Alguersuari and Brendon Hartley.

César Ramos would win the winter series driving for BVM Minardi Team.

== Drivers and Teams ==
2007 Entry List
Team	No.	Driver name	Rounds
(Italy) RP Motorsport	2	(Australia) Daniel Ricciardo	All
(Italy) RP Motorsport	37	(Italy) Federico Leo	All
(Italy) RP Motorsport	55	(Germany) Patrick Kronenberger	All
(Italy) Viola Formula Racing	3	(Italy) Valerio Prandi	All
(Italy) Viola Formula Racing	5	(Venezuela) Bruno Orioli	2–3
(Italy) BVM Minardi Team	4	(Brazil) César Ramos	All
(Italy) BVM Minardi Team	6	(Bulgaria) Simeon Ivanov	All
(Italy) BVM Minardi Team	26	(Brazil) Felipe Lapenna	1–5
(San Marino) W&D Racing Team	7	(San Marino) Paolo Meloni	All
(Italy) IT Loox Racing Car	8	(Italy) Riccardo Cinti	All
(Italy) IT Loox Racing Car	21	(Italy) Niki Sebastiani	1–2
(Italy) IT Loox Racing Car	22	(United Kingdom) Craig Dolby	3
(Italy) IT Loox Racing Car	33	(Italy) Marco Betti	All
(Italy) IT Loox Racing Car	35	(Italy) Christian de Francesch	1–2, 4–7
(Italy) IT Loox Racing Car	40	(Italy) Federico Muggia	5–6
(Italy) IT Loox Racing Car	80	(Italy) Luca Persiani	7
(Italy) IT Loox Racing Car	81	(Italy) Stefano Bizzarri	1–5
(Switzerland) Jenzer Motorsport	9	(United Kingdom) Oliver Turvey	All
(Switzerland) Jenzer Motorsport	10	(Spain) Roberto Merhi	All
(Switzerland) Jenzer Motorsport	11	(Switzerland) Fabio Leimer	All
(Switzerland) Jenzer Motorsport	69	(Norway) Pål Varhaug	6
(Spain) Epsilon Euskadi	12	(Spain) Miquel Julià	All
(Spain) Epsilon Euskadi	14	(Spain) Pablo Montilla	All
(Spain) Epsilon Euskadi	15	(Monaco) Stefano Coletti	All
(Spain) Epsilon Red Bull Team	16	(Finland) Mika Mäki	All
(Spain) Epsilon Red Bull Team	18	(New Zealand) Brendon Hartley	All
(Spain) Epsilon Red Bull Team	19	(Spain) Jaime Alguersuari	All
(Belgium) Thierry Boutsen Racing	20	(Monaco) Stéphane Richelmi	3
(Italy) Prema Powerteam	23	(Italy) Andrea Caldarelli	All
(Italy) Prema Powerteam	24	(United Kingdom) Martin Plowman	All
(Italy) Prema Powerteam	25	(Netherlands) Henkie Waldschmidt	All
(Italy) CO2 Motorsport	27	(Italy) Michele Faccin	All
(Italy) CO2 Motorsport	59	(Italy) Daniel Mancinelli	All
(Italy) CO2 Motorsport	60	(Romania) Matei Mihaescu	6–7
(Romania) Petrom District Racing AP	28	(Spain) Aleix Alcaraz	1–6
(Romania) Petrom District Racing AP	29	(Romania) Mihai Marinescu	All
(Austria) Steiner Motorsport	30	(Austria) Bianca Steiner	1–3, 5–7
(Italy) Tomcat Racing	31	(Italy) Andrea Roda	All
(Italy) Tomcat Racing	32	(Italy) Gianluca Colombo	All
(Italy) Facondini Racing	34	(Italy) Giammarco D'Alelio	1–4
(Italy) Facondini Racing	81	(Italy) Umberto Emanuel Bizzarri	6
(Italy) Facondini Racing	81	(Italy) Stefano Bizzarri	7
(Italy) Team Dueppì	35	(Italy) Christian de Francesch	1–2, 4–7
(Italy) Team Dueppì	47	(Italy) Filippo Ponti	6–7
(Netherlands) Speed Lover	36	(Netherlands) Frank Suntjens	3
(Italy) AP Motorsport	38	(Italy) Patrick Reiterer	All
(Italy) AP Motorsport	39	(Italy) Alessia Belometti	4–5, 7
(Italy) Cram Competition	43	(Italy) Sergio Campana	All
(Italy) Cram Competition	44	(Italy) Daniel Zampieri	All
(Italy) Cram Competition	45	(Italy) Giovanni Nava	1–6
(Italy) Cram Competition	46	(San Marino) Nicola Zonzini	All
(Italy) Cram Competition	49	(Italy) Andrea Pellizzato	7

== Calendar ==
Round	Race	Circuit	Date	Pole position	Fastest lap	Winning driver	Winning team
1	R1	(Italy) ACI Vallelunga Circuit	March 31	(Netherlands) Henkie Waldschmidt	(Netherlands) Henkie Waldschmidt	(Netherlands) Henkie Waldschmidt	(Italy) Prema Powerteam
1	R2	(Italy) ACI Vallelunga Circuit	April 1	(Netherlands) Henkie Waldschmidt	(Netherlands) Henkie Waldschmidt	(Netherlands) Henkie Waldschmidt	(Italy) Prema Powerteam
2	R1	(Italy) ACI Vallelunga Circuit	May 12	(Spain) Jaime Alguersuari	(New Zealand) Brendon Hartley	(Finland) Mika Mäki	(Spain) Epsilon Red Bull Team
2	R2	(Italy) ACI Vallelunga Circuit	May 13	(Spain) Jaime Alguersuari	(Netherlands) Henkie Waldschmidt	(Spain) Jaime Alguersuari	(Spain) Epsilon Red Bull Team
3	R1	(Belgium) Circuit de Spa-Francorchamps	June 15	(Netherlands) Henkie Waldschmidt	(Spain) Jaime Alguersuari	(Spain) Roberto Merhi	(Switzerland) Jenzer Motorsport
3	R2	(Belgium) Circuit de Spa-Francorchamps	June 16	(Spain) Jaime Alguersuari	(New Zealand) Brendon Hartley	(Spain) Jaime Alguersuari	(Spain) Epsilon Red Bull Team
4	R1	(Spain) Circuit Ricardo Tormo	June 30	(Finland) Mika Mäki	(Finland) Mika Mäki	(Finland) Mika Mäki	(Spain) Epsilon Red Bull Team
4	R2	(Spain) Circuit Ricardo Tormo	July 1	(Netherlands) Henkie Waldschmidt	(Spain) Jaime Alguersuari	(Spain) Jaime Alguersuari	(Spain) Epsilon Red Bull Team
5	R1	(Italy) Misano World Circuit	July 21	(Monaco) Stefano Coletti	(New Zealand) Brendon Hartley	(Monaco) Stefano Coletti	(Spain) Epsilon Euskadi
5	R2	(Italy) Misano World Circuit	July 22	(United Kingdom) Oliver Turvey	(New Zealand) Brendon Hartley	(Monaco) Stefano Coletti	(Spain) Epsilon Euskadi
6	R1	(Italy) Mugello Circuit	September 15	(Finland) Mika Mäki	(Finland) Mika Mäki	(Finland) Mika Mäki	(Spain) Epsilon Red Bull Team
6	R2	(Italy) Mugello Circuit	September 16	(New Zealand) Brendon Hartley	(Finland) Mika Mäki	(Finland) Mika Mäki	(Spain) Epsilon Red Bull Team
7	R1	(Italy) Autodromo Nazionale Monza	October 13	(Finland) Mika Mäki	(New Zealand) Brendon Hartley	(Finland) Mika Mäki	(Spain) Epsilon Red Bull Team
7	R2	(Italy) Autodromo Nazionale Monza	October 14	(Romania) Mihai Marinescu	(Italy) Daniel Zampieri	(New Zealand) Brendon Hartley	(Spain) Epsilon Red Bull Team

== Championship standings ==
Each championship round included 2 or 3 races by rounds length of 30 minutes each. Points were awarded as follows:

Position	1st	2nd	3rd	4th	5th	6th	7th	8th	9th	10th	11th	12th	13th	14th	15th
Points	32	28	24	22	20	18	16	14	12	10	8	6	4	2	1

In each race, 2 additional points were awarded for pole position, and 2 for fastest lap.

=== Drivers ===
Pos	Driver	(Italy) VLL1		(Italy) VLL2		(Belgium) SPA		(Spain) VAL		(Italy) MIS		(Italy) MUG		(Italy) MNZ		Points
Pos	Driver	1	2	3	4	5	6	7	8	9	10	11	12	13	14	Points
1	(Finland) Mika Mäki	11	12	1	3	Ret	4	1	3	6	29	1	1	1	Ret	274
2	(Spain) Jaime Alguersuari	12	5	Ret	1	18	1	2	1	10	Ret	3	3	6	2	266
3	(New Zealand) Brendon Hartley	4	3	2	Ret	2	28	9	9	30	8	Ret	2	4	1	236
4	(Spain) Roberto Merhi	5	14	10	5	1	5	8	5	4	4	Ret	DSQ	2	5	232
5	(Romania) Mihai Marinescu	2	2	6	32	7	DNS	11	11	5	6	6	7	3	Ret	206
6	(Australia) Daniel Ricciardo	6	30	4	8	5	Ret	4	4	12	12	4	4	11	9	196
7	(United Kingdom) Martin Plowman	3	4	8	7	3	11	12	13	11	3	15	15	8	7	184
8	(Netherlands) Henkie Waldschmidt	1	1	3	2	Ret	DNS	Ret	18	Ret	Ret	10	10	7	6	184
9	(United Kingdom) Oliver Turvey	14	27	5	6	11	Ret	6	10	2	2	5	6	Ret	23	176
10	(Monaco) Stefano Coletti	21	Ret	24	Ret	16	8	Ret	8	1	1	2	5	Ret	4	164
11	(Switzerland) Fabio Leimer	Ret	13	12	15	4	3	5	2	8	7	13	Ret	5	Ret	161
12	(Italy) Andrea Caldarelli	9	7	7	Ret	13	2	14	Ret	3	Ret	8	8	13	8	150
13	(Brazil) Felipe Lapenna	7	6	9	4	10	Ret	7	7	9	9					134
14	(Brazil) César Ramos	8	28	Ret	14	8	7	15	25	13	5	Ret	18	10	3	106
15	(Italy) Daniel Zampieri	15	10	Ret	11	12	6	Ret	12	14	13	7	17	12	19	80
16	(Italy) Daniel Mancinelli	20	Ret	DNS	16	6	9	3	6	7	10	Ret	14	14	Ret	78
17	(Spain) Aleix Alcaraz	16	8	Ret	10	9	20	10	Ret	15	15	12	13			61
18	(Italy) Riccardo Cinti	16	11	14	31	17	Ret	17	28	17	19	Ret	9	9	Ret	34
19	(Germany) Patrick Kronenberger	18	16	33	30	34	10	16	14	18	17	9	12	16	Ret	31
20	(Italy) Michele Faccin	33	15	13	12	14	12	13	Ret	16	14	14	16	Ret	Ret	29
21	(Bulgaria) Simeon Ivanov	10	9	17	13	21	15	Ret	17	19	21	18	Ret	Ret	Ret	27
22	(Italy) Federico Muggia									Ret	11	11	11			24
23	(Italy) Niki Sebastiani	17	29	11	9											20
24	(Italy) Christian de Francesch	25	20	25	26			Ret	23	Ret	25	17	22	19	10	10
25	(Italy) Valerio Prandi	Ret	17	21	19	29	17	Ret	Ret	Ret	30	Ret	20	18	11	8
26	(Italy) Filippo Ponti											28	Ret	17	12	6
27	(Italy) Patrick Reiterer	Ret	Ret	Ret	27	15	13	Ret	16	20	Ret	Ret	DNS	23	18	5
28	(Italy) Glauco Junior Solieri											16	13			4
29	(Romania) Matei Mihaescu											Ret	25	25	13	4
30	(Spain) Miquel Julià Perello	29	23	20	17	19	14	19	15	22	16	20	23	Ret	Ret	3
31	(San Marino) Paolo Meloni	22	26	26	21	31	22	Ret	19	Ret	Ret	19	32	Ret	14	2
32	(Italy) Marco Betti	34	21	30	Ret	Ret	25	23	Ret	Ret	28	22	30	21	15	1
33	(Italy) Sergio Campana	26	Ret	19	20	25	16	25	Ret	21	18	Ret	19	15	Ret	1
34	(Austria) Bianca Steiner	27	Ret	15	Ret	20	Ret			24	Ret	26	Ret	22	20	1
35	(Italy) Nicola Zonzini	24	19	27	25	27	21	Ret	20	31	22	16	24	Ret	16	0
36	(Italy) Giovanni Nava	23	18	16	18	26	19	18	21	Ret	23	27	29			0
37	(Italy) Federico Leo	19	Ret	18	Ret	Ret	Ret	21	22	27	24	25	26	27	17	0
38	(Monaco) Stéphane Richelmi					24	18									0
39	(Italy) Stefano Bizzarri	28	22	22	Ret	30	24	20	Ret	26	20			24	Ret	0
40	(Italy) Gianluca Colombo	30	24	29	28	32	Ret	Ret	24	23	27	23	Ret	20	21	0
41	(Italy) Umberto Emanuel Bizzarri											21	21			0
42	(Venezuela) Bruno Orioli			23	29	21	27									0
43	(Italy) Giammarco D'Alelio	Ret	Ret	28	22	33	Ret	22	DNS							0
44	(United Kingdom) Craig Dolby					23	23									0
45	(Italy) Andrea Roda	31	Ret	31	24	Ret	DNS	Ret	26	28	31	29	31	28	22	0
46	(Spain) Pablo Montilla	32	25	32	23	Ret	26	24	27	29	26	Ret	28	Ret	Ret	0
47	(Norway) Pål Varhaug											24	27			0
48	(Italy) Alessia Belometti							Ret	Ret	25	Ret			Ret	Ret	0
49	(Italy) Luca Persiani													26	Ret	0
50	(Netherlands) Frank Suntjens					28	Ret									0
51	(Italy) Andrea Pellizzato													29	DNS	0

== Winter Series ==
César Ramos achieved the perfect Winter Series with 4 wins, 4 Pole positions and 4 fastest laps.

- The same point system is used with 2 points for Fasted lap and 2 points for Pole position.

Pos	Driver	Team	(Italy) VAL Nov 10–11		(Italy) VAL Nov 17–18		Points
Pos	Driver	Team	1	2	3	4	Points
1	(Brazil) César Ramos	BVM Minardi Team	1	1	1	1	144
2	(Italy) Daniel Zampieri	Cram Competition	6	5	5	2	86
3	(Italy) Fabio Onidi	RP Motorsport	3	4	3	7	86
4	(Italy) Riccardo Cinti	Riccardo Cinti	4	2	11	4	80
5	(Italy) Niki Sebastiani	It Loox Racing	2	Ret	6	3	70
6	(Italy) Federico Rossi	CO2 Motorsport			2	6	46
7	(Spain) Genís Olivé	Cram Competition	10	6	10	11	46
8	(Italy) Salvatore Cicatelli	Viola Formula Racing	Ret	10	4	9	44
9	(Italy) Valentino Sebastiani	It Loox Racing	5	16	16	5	40
10	(Spain) Roberto Merhi	BVM Minardi Team	8	3			38
11	(Italy) Stefano Bizzarri	RP Motorsport	9	9	Ret	8	38
12	(Italy) Mirko Bortolotti	Tomcat Racing	12	11	8	12	34
13	(Spain) Miki Monrás	Cram Competition	13	14	7	10	32
14	(Italy) Nicola Zonzini	Cram Competition	7	15	9	14	31
15	(Bulgaria) Simeon Ivanov	BVM Minardi Team	11	7			24
16	(Italy) Alberto Cola	AP Motorsport	17	8	15	13	19
17	(Italy) Andrea Roda	Tomcat Racing	15	13	13	Ret	9
18	(Italy) Alessia Belometti	AP Motorsport	16	12	14	Ret	8
19	(Switzerland) Stefano Comini	CO2 Motorsport			12	16	6
20	(Italy) Andrea Borio	Facondini Racing	14	Ret	Ret	15	3
