= 2009 European F3 Open Championship =

Motor racing competition

Seasons
- ← 2008 2010 →

The 2009 European F3 Open Championship was the first season with the new championship denomination after eight seasons of the Spanish Formula Three Championship. It began on 2 May 2009 in Valencia and will end on 1 November in Montmeló after 16 rounds in five countries. The main Class A title was claimed by Bruno Méndez, holding off Celso Míguez by just two points. Callum MacLeod won the secondary Copa F306/300, as well as finishing ninth in the overall championship. Méndez's team Campos Racing also claimed the teams title, beating main rivals Drivex by seven points.

== Teams and drivers ==
- All cars are powered by Fiat engines. Main class powered by Dallara F308, while Copa Class by Dallara F306 chassis.

Team	No	Driver	Rounds
Class A
(Spain) Campos Racing	1	(Spain) Adrián Campos Jr.	All
(Spain) Campos Racing	2	(Spain) Bruno Méndez	All
(Spain) GTA Motor Competición	3	(Argentina) Augusto Scalbi	1–4
(Spain) emiliodevillota.com	4	(Italy) Samuele Buttarelli	1–6
(Spain) emiliodevillota.com	4	(United Kingdom) Jonathan Legris	7
(Spain) emiliodevillota.com	5	(Spain) Sergio Canamasas	All
(Spain) emiliodevillota.com	12	(United Kingdom) Jonathan Legris	2–4
(Spain) emiliodevillota.com	12	(Romania) Doru Sechelariu	5–8
(Italy) RP Motorsport	6	(Italy) David Fumanelli	All
(Italy) RP Motorsport	7	(Italy) Kevin Ceccon	All
(Italy) RP Motorsport	8	(Italy) Stefano Bizzarri	1–2, 4–8
(Italy) RP Motorsport	8	(Finland) Jesse Krohn	3
(Spain) Drivex	9	(Spain) Celso Míguez	All
(Spain) Meycom	11	(Spain) Nil Montserrat	2, 8
(Spain) Porteiro Motorsport	14	(Colombia) Carlos Muñoz	3, 6–7
(United Kingdom) Team West-Tec	88	(Norway) Christian Ebbesvik	All
Copa F306/300
(Spain) GTA Motor Competición	10	(Spain) Carmen Jordá	1–4
(Spain) Campos Racing	10	(Spain) Carmen Jordá	5–8
(Spain) Campos Racing	20	(Venezuela) Bruno Palli	All
(Spain) Campos Racing	21	(Spain) Jorge Clara	1
(United Kingdom) Team West-Tec	22	(Iceland) Kristján Einar	1, 3–6, 8
(United Kingdom) Team West-Tec	22	(Australia) Tom Tweedie	7
(United Kingdom) Team West-Tec	55	(United Kingdom) Callum MacLeod	All
(Spain) Q8 Oils Hache Team	24	(Spain) Edgar Fernández	All
(Spain) Q8 Oils Hache Team	25	(Spain) Toño Fernández	All
(Spain) Q8 Oils Hache Team	27	(Italy) Michele Faccin	1–2, 4–6
(Spain) Q8 Oils Hache Team	27	(Spain) Nil Montserrat	3
(Italy) RP Motorsport	28	(Finland) Jesse Krohn	1
(Italy) RP Motorsport	28	(Venezuela) Biagio Bulnes	2–8
(Spain) Llusiá Racing	29	(Spain) Borja Signes	1–2
(Spain) Drivex	31	(Spain) Luis Villalba	1
(Spain) Drivex	31	(Spain) José Luis Abadín	2–7
(Spain) Drivex	33	(Japan) Ryuichi Nara	8
(Spain) Novo Team ECA	35	(France) Emmanuel Piget	8
(Spain) emiliodevillota.com	36	(United Kingdom) Jonathan Legris	1
(Spain) emiliodevillota.com	36	(Lebanon) Noel Jammal	2–8

== Calendar ==
Round		Circuit	Date	Pole position	Fastest lap	Winning driver	Winning team
1	R1	(Spain) Circuit de Valencia	2 May	(Spain) Adrián Campos Jr.	(Spain) Adrián Campos Jr.	(Spain) Adrián Campos Jr.	(Spain) Campos Racing
1	R2	(Spain) Circuit de Valencia	3 May		(Spain) Bruno Méndez	(Spain) Celso Míguez	(Spain) Drivex
2	R1	(Spain) Circuito Permanente del Jarama	6 June	(Spain) Bruno Méndez	(Spain) Celso Míguez	(Spain) Celso Míguez	(Spain) Drivex
2	R2	(Spain) Circuito Permanente del Jarama	7 June		(Spain) Bruno Méndez	(Spain) Bruno Méndez	(Spain) Campos Racing
3	R1	(Belgium) Circuit de Spa-Francorchamps	27 June	(Spain) Celso Míguez	(Spain) Adrián Campos Jr.	(Spain) Bruno Méndez	(Spain) Campos Racing
3	R2	(Belgium) Circuit de Spa-Francorchamps	28 June		(United Kingdom) Jonathan Legris	(United Kingdom) Jonathan Legris	(Spain) emiliodevillota.com
4	R1	(United Kingdom) Donington Park	4 July	(Norway) Christian Ebbesvik	(Spain) Bruno Méndez	(Norway) Christian Ebbesvik	(United Kingdom) Team West-Tec
4	R2	(United Kingdom) Donington Park	5 July		(United Kingdom) Jonathan Legris	(Italy) Stefano Bizzarri	(Italy) RP Motorsport
5	R1	(France) Circuit de Nevers Magny-Cours	19 September	(Spain) Bruno Méndez	(Spain) Bruno Méndez	(Spain) Bruno Méndez	(Spain) Campos Racing
5	R2	(France) Circuit de Nevers Magny-Cours	20 September		(Spain) Bruno Méndez	(Spain) Celso Míguez	(Spain) Drivex
6	R1	(Italy) Autodromo Nazionale Monza	3 October	(Spain) Celso Míguez	(Spain) Bruno Méndez	(Spain) Celso Míguez	(Spain) Drivex
6	R2	(Italy) Autodromo Nazionale Monza	4 October		(Spain) Celso Míguez	(Spain) Celso Míguez	(Spain) Drivex
7	R1	(Spain) Circuito de Jerez	17 October	(Spain) Celso Míguez	(Spain) Bruno Méndez	(Spain) Bruno Méndez	(Spain) Campos Racing
7	R2	(Spain) Circuito de Jerez	18 October		(Norway) Christian Ebbesvik	(Italy) David Fumanelli	(Italy) RP Motorsport
8	R1	(Spain) Circuit de Catalunya	31 October	(Spain) Adrián Campos Jr.	(Spain) Sergio Canamasas	(Spain) Adrián Campos Jr.	(Spain) Campos Racing
8	R2	(Spain) Circuit de Catalunya	1 November		(Spain) Bruno Méndez	(Italy) David Fumanelli	(Italy) RP Motorsport

== Standings ==
=== Class A ===
- Points are awarded as follows:

	1	2	3	4	5	6	7	8	9	PP	FL
Race 1	14	12	10	8	6	5	3	2	1	**1**	1
Race 2	12	10	8	6	5	4	3	2	1	0	1

Pos	Driver	VAL (Spain)		JAR (Spain)		SPA (Belgium)		DON (United Kingdom)		MAG (France)		MNZ (Italy)		JER (Spain)		CAT (Spain)		Pts
1	(Spain) Bruno Méndez	4	2	**3**	1	1	3	3	20	**1**	14	2	2	1	Ret	7	2	145
2	(Spain) Celso Míguez	6	**1**	1	3	**6**	**2**	2	3	5	1	**1**	1	**2**	DSQ	2	4	143
3	(Italy) Stefano Bizzarri	2	7	12	Ret			6	**1**	4	2	6	3	4	3	6	**3**	92
4	(Spain) Adrián Campos Jr.	**1**	Ret	5	4	15	6	11	5	3	4	Ret	15	7	Ret	**1**	6	76
5	(Norway) Christian Ebbesvik	9	10	7	5	16	8	**1**	6	8	3	3	5	16	7	10	7	63
6	(Spain) Sergio Canamasas	12	11	2	16	5	7	9	12	12	6	Ret	14	5	2	3	9	54
7	(United Kingdom) Jonathan Legris	5	3	13	Ret	7	1	5	2					Ret	Ret			47
8	(Italy) David Fumanelli	13	13	15	11	13	12	Ret	14	7	10	8	Ret	6	1	4	1	42
9	(United Kingdom) Callum MacLeod	7	6	6	**Ret**	3	4	7	18	Ret	Ret	9	8	8	5	11	11	41
10	(Argentina) Augusto Scalbi	10	5	4	2	4	Ret	Ret	4									37
11	(Colombia) Carlos Muñoz					2	5					Ret	18	3	4			33
12	(Italy) Kevin Ceccon	15	12	11	17	9	10	4	7	9	5	5	4	9	Ret	8	18	33
13	(Spain) Toño Fernández	17	8	18	8	11	16	12	13	2	Ret	12	9	12	8	12	8	21
14	(Spain) Nil Montserrat			8	6	10	9									5	5	18
15	(Spain) José Luis Abadín			16	9	8	11	14	8	6	7	10	7	18	10			16
16	(Romania) Doru Sechelariu									13	8	4	Ret	11	6	14	10	14
17	(Finland) Jesse Krohn	3	Ret			12	Ret											10
18	(Italy) Michele Faccin	8	4	10	Ret			10	9	14	Ret	Ret	16					9
19	(Italy) Samuele Buttarelli	Ret	18	Ret	10	Ret	15	8	16	Ret	Ret	7	6					9
20	(Spain) Edgar Fernández	16	9	9	7	17	19	19	17	10	12	15	17	17	14	15	13	5
21	(Spain) Carmen Jordá	11	Ret	Ret	12	20	14	18	15	15	9	13	11	19	13	16	12	1
22	(Venezuela) Bruno Palli	18	14	Ret	15	18	DSQ	13	11	DSQ	11	Ret	13	10	9	18	15	1
23	(France) Emmanuel Piget															9	17	1
24	(Iceland) Kristján Einar	20	16			14	13	16	10	11	15	Ret	12			17	14	0
25	(Lebanon) Noel Jammal			17	14	19	17	15	Ret	DNS	Ret	14	19	14	11	Ret	19	0
26	(Venezuela) Biagio Bulnes			Ret	13	21	18	17	19	Ret	13	11	10	13	Ret	13	20	0
27	(Spain) Luis Villalba	14	15															0
28	(Australia) Tom Tweedie													15	12			0
29	(Spain) Borja Signes	19	Ret	14	Ret													0
30	(Japan) Ryuichi Nara															Ret	16	0
31	(Spain) Jorge Clara	Ret	17															0
Pos	Driver	VAL (Spain)		JAR (Spain)		SPA (Belgium)		DON (United Kingdom)		MAG (France)		MNZ (Italy)		JER (Spain)		CAT (Spain)		Pts

Colour	Result
Gold	Winner
Silver	Second place
Bronze	Third place
Green	Points classification
Blue	Non-points classification
Blue	Non-classified finish (NC)
Purple	Retired, not classified (Ret)
Red	Did not qualify (DNQ)
Red	Did not pre-qualify (DNPQ)
Black	Disqualified (DSQ)
White	Did not start (DNS)
White	Withdrew (WD)
White	Race cancelled (C)
Blank	Did not practice (DNP)
Blank	Did not arrive (DNA)
Blank	Excluded (EX)

**Bold** – Pole
Italics – Fastest Lap

=== Copa F306/300 ===
- Points are awarded for both races as follows:

Pos	1	2	3	4	5
Points	10	8	6	4	3

Pos	Driver	VAL (Spain)		JAR (Spain)		SPA (Belgium)		DON (United Kingdom)		MAG (France)		MNZ (Italy)		JER (Spain)		CAT (Spain)		Pts
1	(United Kingdom) Callum MacLeod	3	3	1	Ret	1	1	1	8	Ret	Ret	1	2	1	1	2	2	106
2	(Spain) Toño Fernández	8	4	7	2	4	7	3	5	1	Ret	4	3	3	2	3	1	79
3	(Spain) José Luis Abadín			5	3	2	3	5	1	2	1	2	1	8	4			73
4	(Spain) Edgar Fernández	7	5	2	1	6	10	10	7	3	4	7	9	7	8	4	5	38
5	(Italy) Michele Faccin	4	2	3	Ret			2	2	5	Ret	Ret	8					37
6	(Spain) Carmen Jordá	5	Ret	Ret	4	9	5	9	6	6	2	5	5	9	7	6	3	30
7	(Venezuela) Bruno Palli	9	6	Ret	7	7	DSQ	4	4	DSQ	3	Ret	7	2	3	8	6	28
8	(Venezuela) Biagio Bulnes			Ret	5	10	9	8	9	Ret	5	3	4	4	Ret	4	10	24
9	(Iceland) Kristján Einar	11	8			5	4	7	3	4	6	Ret	6			5	7	20
10	(United Kingdom) Jonathan Legris	2	1															18
11	(Spain) Nil Montserrat					3	2											14
12	(Finland) Jesse Krohn	1	Ret															10
13	(France) Emmanuel Piget															1	7	10
14	(Lebanon) Noel Jammal			6	6	8	8	6	Ret	DNS	Ret	6	10	5	5	Ret	9	6
15	(Spain) Borja Signes	10	Ret	5	Ret													3
16	(Australia) Tom Tweedie													6	6			0
17	(Spain) Luis Villalba	6	7															0
18	(Japan) Ryuichi Nara															Ret	7	0
19	(Spain) Jorge Clara	Ret	9															0
Pos	Driver	VAL (Spain)		JAR (Spain)		SPA (Belgium)		DON (United Kingdom)		MAG (France)		MNZ (Italy)		JER (Spain)		CAT (Spain)		Pts

Colour	Result
Gold	Winner
Silver	Second place
Bronze	Third place
Green	Points classification
Blue	Non-points classification
Blue	Non-classified finish (NC)
Purple	Retired, not classified (Ret)
Red	Did not qualify (DNQ)
Red	Did not pre-qualify (DNPQ)
Black	Disqualified (DSQ)
White	Did not start (DNS)
White	Withdrew (WD)
White	Race cancelled (C)
Blank	Did not practice (DNP)
Blank	Did not arrive (DNA)
Blank	Excluded (EX)

=== Team Standings ===
- Points for each team's best scoring chassis are awarded for both races as follows:

Pos	1	2	3	4	5
Points	10	8	6	4	3

- All teams use Dallara chassis; the car designation is listed in the Chassis column.

Pos	Team	Chassis	VAL (Spain)		JAR (Spain)		SPA (Belgium)		DON (United Kingdom)		MAG (France)		MNZ (Italy)		JER (Spain)		CAT (Spain)		Pts
1	(Spain) Campos Racing	F308	1	2	3	1	1	3	3	5	1	4	2	2	1	Ret	1	2	117
1	(Spain) Campos Racing	F306	18	14	Ret	15	18	DSQ	13	11	15	9	13	11	10	9	16	12	117
2	(Spain) Drivex	F308	6	1	1	3	6	2	2	3	5	1	1	1	2	DSQ	2	4	110
2	(Spain) Drivex	F306	14	15	16	9	8	11	14	8	6	7	10	7	18	10	Ret	16	110
3	(Italy) RP Motorsport	F308	2	7	11	11	9	10	4	1	4	2	5	3	4	1	4	1	79
3	(Italy) RP Motorsport	F306	3	Ret	Ret	13	21	18	17	19	Ret	13	11	10	13	Ret	13	20	79
4	(Spain) emiliodevillota.com	F308	12	11	2	10	5	1	5	2	12	6	4	6	5	2	3	9	69
4	(Spain) emiliodevillota.com	F306	5	3	17	14	19	17	15	Ret	DNS	Ret	14	19	14	11	Ret	19	69
5	(United Kingdom) Team West-Tec	F308	9	10	7	5	16	8	1	6	8	3	3	5	16	7	10	7	53
5	(United Kingdom) Team West-Tec	F306	7	6	6	Ret	3	4	7	10	11	15	9	8	8	5	11	11	53
6	(Spain) Porteiro Motorsport	F308					2	5					Ret	18	3	4			23
7	(Spain) GTA Motor Competición	F308	10	5	4	2	4	Ret	Ret	4									23
7	(Spain) GTA Motor Competición	F306	11	Ret	Ret	12	20	14	18	15									23
8	(Spain) Q8 Oils Hache Team	F306	8	4	9	7	10	9	10	9	2	12	12	9	12	8	12	8	12
9	(Spain) Meycom	F308			8	6											5	5	9
10	(Spain) Novo Team ECA	F306															9	17	0
11	(Spain) Llusiá Racing	F306	19	Ret	14	Ret													0
Pos	Team	Chassis	VAL (Spain)		JAR (Spain)		SPA (Belgium)		DON (United Kingdom)		MAG (France)		MNZ (Italy)		JER (Spain)		CAT (Spain)		Pts

Colour	Result
Gold	Winner
Silver	Second place
Bronze	Third place
Green	Points classification
Blue	Non-points classification
Blue	Non-classified finish (NC)
Purple	Retired, not classified (Ret)
Red	Did not qualify (DNQ)
Red	Did not pre-qualify (DNPQ)
Black	Disqualified (DSQ)
White	Did not start (DNS)
White	Withdrew (WD)
White	Race cancelled (C)
Blank	Did not practice (DNP)
Blank	Did not arrive (DNA)
Blank	Excluded (EX)
