= Simeon Ivanov =

Simeon Ivanov may refer to:

- Simeon Ivanov (footballer)
- Simeon Ivanov (racing driver)
