= David Fumanelli =

Italian racing driver

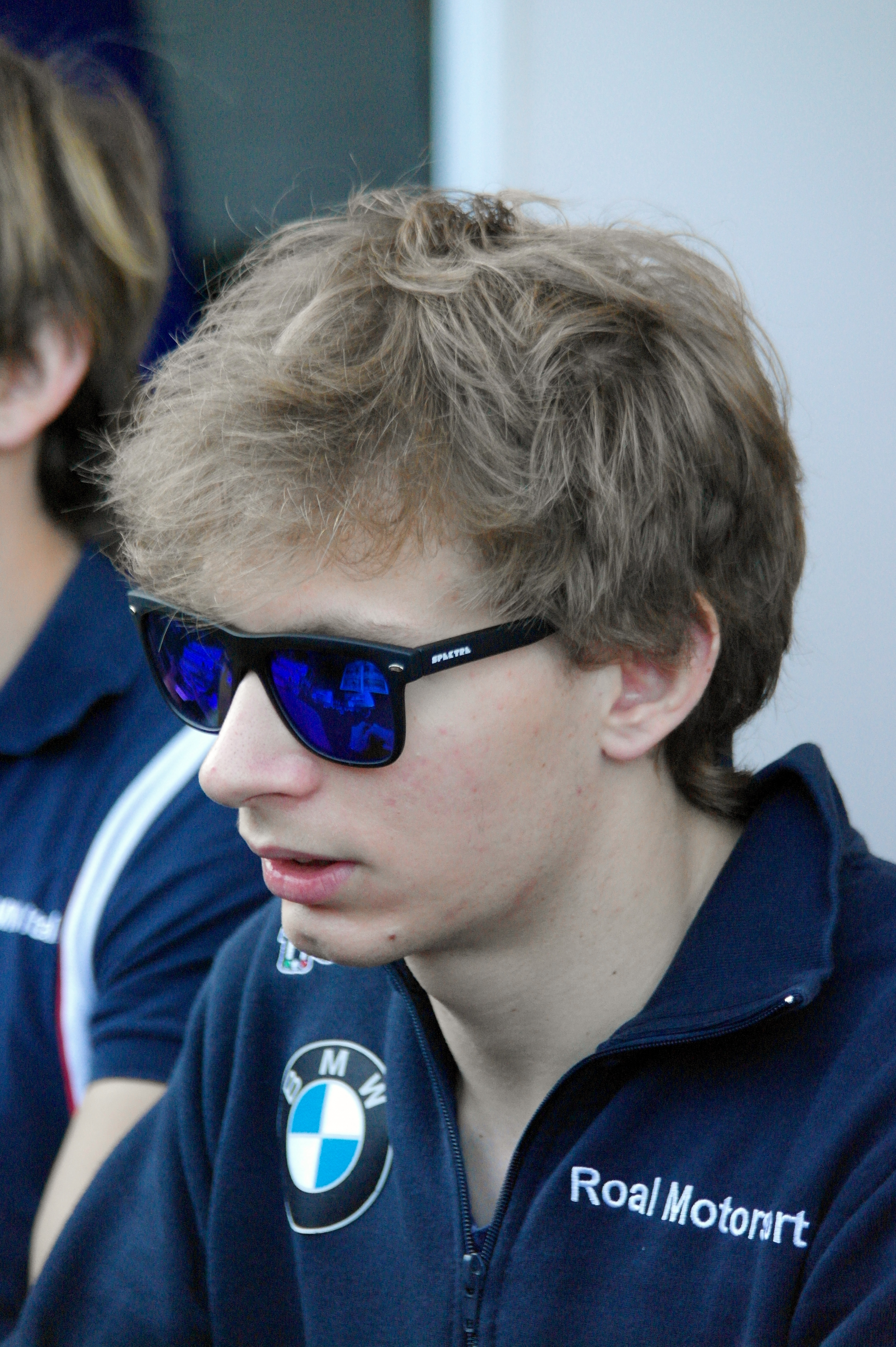
- David Fumanelli at Brands Hatch
- Nationality: (Italy) Italian
- Born: David Cleto Fumanelli; 21 April 1992 (age 34) Milan, Italy
- Categorisation: FIA Silver (until 2022); FIA Gold (2023–)
- Wins: 15
- Podiums: 38
- Poles: 15
- Fastest laps: 8

David Cleto Fumanelli (21 April 1992, Milan) is an Italian racing driver and racing coach.

== Single Seater Career ==
=== Formula Renault 2.0 ===
Fumanelli, after just two years of national karting races, made his single-seater debut in 2008 in his native Italian Formula Renault 2.0 series, driving for RP Motorsport.

=== Formula 3 ===
In September 2008, Fumanelli made his Formula 3 debut in the Spanish Formula 3 series, competing in the last two rounds of the championship. During the last event in Valencia, he was involved in a violent airborne accident with Spanish driver Carmen Jordá, which resulted in a vertebra trauma, which forced him to a six-month stop.

Fumanelli remained in the series for 2009, the first of three full seasons in the category with RP Motorsport. He finished his first full season in eighth place and "Best Rookie" after recording two late-season victories at Jerez and Barcelona.

In 2010, Fumanelli took three race wins to finish the year third overall, showing an impressive progression and speed.

In 2011, Fumanelli finished as F3 European Open Vice - Champion. After a slow start to the season, which saw just one podium finish in the first eight races, he took four race victories in the final eight races, to finish eight points behind the Swiss driver Alex Fontana.

=== GP3 Series ===
Following a successful test at Jerez in December 2011, Fumanelli graduated to the GP3 Series in 2012, racing for MW Arden Team.

Fumanelli's rookie season was very strong; many top-five qualifying efforts brought him to a podium finish at the European GP in Valencia Street Circuit and a fourth place in the Monaco Grand Prix.

Fumanelli was forced to miss the Silverstone round due to family matters, and he finished the season 11th overall in the championship.

In 2013, Fumanelli continued in the series with the Italian team Trident. Despite some very strong winter tests, he struggled with performance during the season and left the championship before the final round. His best result of the season was seventh place in race 1 at the 2013 Catalunya GP3 Series round. He finished the season 19th overall.

== GT career ==
=== Blancpain GT Series ===
In 2014, Fumanelli switched to GT racing and made his debut in the Blancpain GT Sprint Series with Roal Motorsport with a BMW Z4 GT3, sharing the box with the great Alex Zanardi. He finished the season as Silver Cup Vice-Champion with his mate Stefano Colombo.

In 2016, Fumanelli was called to compete in the 24 Hours of Spa-Francorchamps by Scuderia Praha with the new Ferrari 488 GT3.

In 2017, Fumanelli was selected by McLaren GT as Junior Driver to race for the factory team Strakka Racing with a McLaren 650S GT3. He competed in the Endurance series, plus some spot races in the Sprint Series alongside Lewis Williamson.

Fumanelli was forced to leave McLaren at the end of the year due to a company restructuring.

Strakka Racing decided to keep Fumanelli for his 2018 campaign, where they switched from McLaren to Mercedes AMG. They debuted together at Bathurst 12 hours, first round of the Intercontinental GT Challenge with a Mercedes AMG GT3 finishing third in Pro Am class. He was involved in both Intercontinental GT Challenge and Blancpain GT Endurance races, where he was selected to race in the Mercedes AMG factory car for the Silverstone round, alongside the two German aces Max Buhk and Maximilian Götz.

The highlights of the year, together with the Bathurst podium, were the second place in Pro Am class at the 24 hours of Spa-Francorchamps and first place in Pro Am in the California 8 hours, Laguna Seca.

In 2019, Fumanelli did two races for Strakka Racing, finishing third in Pro Am at the 24 hours of Spa-Francorchamps alongside Christina Nielsen, Richard Heidstand and Jack Hawksworth.

Fumanelli raced for Mercedes Black Falcon Team in the last round of Blancpain GT Endurance, finishing second in the Silver class and seventh overall.

=== Ferrari Challenge Europe ===
In 2017, Fumanelli won the Ferrari Master Show race during the Bologna Motor Show, with a Ferrari 488 Challenge with Rossocorsa Racing.

In 2018, he did three races in Ferrari Challenge Europe with Rossocorsa Racing, finishing second in the World Finals at Monza.

=== Renault Sport Trophy ===
Between 2015 and 2016, Fumanelli competed for the Oregon Team in the Renault Sport Trophy, a one-make sports-car series made by Renault Sport.

Fumanelli won the Endurance title in 2015 with his teammate Dario Capitanio and finished third in Pro class standings.

== Racing record ==
=== Career summary ===
Season	Series	Team	Races	Wins	Poles	F/Laps	Podiums	Points	Position
2008	Italian Formula Renault 2.0	RP Motorsport	12	0	0	0	0	14	25th
2008	Spanish Formula 3 Championship	RP Motorsport	3	0	0	0	0	0	NC
2009	European F3 Open	RP Motorsport	16	2	0	0	2	43	8th
2009	Italian Formula 3 Championship	RP Motorsport	4	0	0	0	0	0	22nd
2010	European F3 Open	RP Motorsport	16	3	3	2	5	112	**3rd**
2010	Italian Formula 3 Championship	RP Motorsport	2	0	0	0	0	2	20th
2011	European F3 Open	RP Motorsport	16	4	4	4	7	115	**2nd**
2011	Italian Formula 3 Championship	RP Motorsport	2	0	0	0	0	1	18th
2012	GP3 Series	MW Arden	16	0	0	0	1	47	11th
2013	GP3 Series	Trident Racing	14	0	0	0	0	6	19th
2014	Blancpain Sprint Series	ROAL Motorsport	14	0	0	0	0	3	26th
2014	Blancpain Sprint Series - Silver Cup	ROAL Motorsport	14	4	4	0	10	154	**2nd**
2015	Renault Sport Trophy - Elite Class	Oregon Team	9	1	2	0	2	103	**3rd**
2015	Renault Sport Endurance Trophy	Oregon Team	6	1	1	0	6	115	**1st**
2016	Renault Sport Trophy - Pro Class	Oregon Team	9	0	1	0	4	95	4th
2016	Renault Sport Endurance Trophy	Oregon Team	6	0	0	0	0	27	11th
2016	Lamborghini Super Trofeo Europe	Automobile Tricolore	2	0	1	1	1	15	15th
2016	Blancpain GT Series Endurance Cup	Scuderia Praha	1	0	0	0	0	0	NC
2016	Blancpain GT Series Endurance Cup - Pro-Am	Scuderia Praha	1	0	0	0	0	13	30th
2017	Blancpain GT Series Sprint Cup	Strakka Racing	4	0	0	0	0	0	NC
2017	Blancpain GT Series Sprint Cup - Silver	Strakka Racing	4	3	2	2	3	55	5th
2017	Blancpain GT Series Endurance Cup	Strakka Racing	5	0	0	0	0	0	NC
2017	Blancpain GT Series Endurance Cup - Pro-Am	Strakka Racing	1	0	0	0	0	12	32nd
2017	Intercontinental GT Challenge	Strakka Racing	1	0	0	0	0	0	NC
2018	Blancpain GT Series Endurance Cup	Strakka Racing	4	0	0	0	0	14	30th
2018	Blancpain GT Series Endurance Cup - Pro-Am	Strakka Racing	1	0	0	0	1	42	10th
2018	Intercontinental GT Challenge	Strakka Racing	4	0	0	0	0	6	22nd
2018	Ferrari Challenge Europe - Trofeo Pirelli (Pro)	Rossocorsa	6	1	1	0	2	51	6th
2019	Blancpain GT Series Endurance Cup - Silver	Black Falcon	1	0	0	0	1	18	19th
2019	Blancpain GT Series Endurance Cup	Black Falcon	1	0	0	0	0	6	29th
2019	Blancpain GT Series Endurance Cup	Strakka Racing	2	0	0	0	0	6	29th
2019	Blancpain GT Series Endurance Cup - Pro-Am	Strakka Racing	1	0	0	0	1	27	13th
2019	GT Cup Open Europe	Scuderia San Marino	2	0	0	?	0	0	NC†
2019-20	Asian Le Mans Series - LMP3	ACE1 Villorba Corse	3	1	0	1	2	50	4th
2020	Porsche Carrera Cup Italy	Team Q8 Hi Performance	12	2	2	2	6	138	**2nd**
2020	Le Mans Cup - GT3	Kessel Racing	1	0	0	0	0	6	15th
2021	Italian GT Championship - GT3	Kessel Racing	6	3	1	2	5	84	**3rd**
2021	GT World Challenge Europe Endurance Cup	Kessel Racing	1	0	0	0	0	0	NC
2021	GT World Challenge Europe Endurance Cup - Pro-Am	Kessel Racing	1	0	0	0	0	2	37th
2021	Intercontinental GT Challenge	Kessel Racing	1	0	0	0	0	0	NC
2022	International GT Open	Kessel Racing	13	0	4	1	1	47	8th
2022	International GT Open - Pro-Am	Kessel Racing	13	0	5	1	6	54	4th
2022	Asian Le Mans Series - GT	Kessel Racing	2	0	0	0	0	2	14th
2022	24H GT Series - GT3	Kessel Racing	2	0	0	1	0	12	NC†
2023	International GT Open	Kessel Racing	11	0	1	1	0	6	27th
2023	International GT Open - Pro-Am	Kessel Racing	11	0	1	1	3	22	9th
2023	Asian Le Mans Series - GT	Kessel Racing	2	0	0	0	0	0	22nd
2023	Le Mans Cup - GT3	Kessel Racing	2	0	0	0	0	0	NC†
2023	24H GT Series - GT3	Kessel Racing	3	2	0	0	2	90	7th
2024	GT World Challenge Europe Endurance Cup	Kessel Racing	4	0	0	0	0	0	NC
2024	Le Mans Cup - GT3	Kessel Racing	7	1	0	1	2	64.5	5th
2024	Gulf 12 Hours - Pro-Am	Kessel Racing	1	0	1	0	1	N/A	**3rd**
2024	24H Series - GT3	Boem by Kessel Racing	2	0	1	0	0	24	26th
2024	International GT Open	racing one	4	0	0	1	0	2	34th
2025	IMSA SportsCar Championship - GTD	Inception Racing	1	0	0	0	0	153	86th
2025	24H Series - GT3	CCC Kessel Racing							
2025	Le Mans Cup - GT3	Kessel Racing	6	2	0	1	2	70*	**2nd***
2025	GT World Challenge Europe Endurance Cup	Kessel Racing	5	0	0	0	0	0	NC
2026	IMSA SportsCar Championship - GTD	Inception Racing	1	0	0	0	0	202	72nd
2026	Le Mans Cup - GT3	Kessel Racing	6	3	0	1	4	93	**3rd**
2026	GT World Challenge Europe Sprint Cup	Kessel Racing	7	0	0	0	0	0	NC
2026	GT World Challenge Europe Sprint Cup - Bronze	Kessel Racing	7	0	0	0	0	16.5	10th
2026	Italian GT Championship Endurance Cup - GT3	Kessel Racing	4	0	0	0	0	8	18th
2026	International GT Open	Al Manar by Dragon Racing	2	0	0	0	0	9	32nd

^{†} As Fumanelli was a guest driver, he was ineligible to score championship points.
^{*} Season still in progress.

=== Complete GP3 Series results ===
(key) (Races in bold indicate pole position) (Races in italics indicate fastest lap)

Year	Entrant	1	2	3	4	5	6	7	8	9	10	11	12	13	14	15	16	D.C.	Points
2012	MW Arden	CAT; FEA; 9	CAT; SPR; 17	MON; FEA; 4	MON; SPR; 5	VAL; FEA; 3	VAL; SPR; 16	SIL; FEA; DNS	SIL; SPR; DNS	HOC; FEA; 12	HOC; SPR; 10	HUN; FEA; 8	HUN; SPR; Ret	SPA; FEA; 20	SPA; SPR; Ret	MNZ; FEA; 6	MNZ; SPR; 13	11th	47
2013	Trident Racing	CAT; FEA; 7	CAT; SPR; 17	VAL; FEA; Ret	VAL; SPR; Ret	SIL; FEA; Ret	SIL; SPR; 20	NÜR; FEA; 17	NÜR; SPR; 20	HUN; FEA; 16	HUN; SPR; 18	SPA; FEA; 15	SPA; SPR; 14	MNZ; FEA; 15	MNZ; SPR; 18	YMC; FEA	YMC; SPR	19th	6

=== Complete GT World Challenge Europe results ===
==== GT World Challenge Europe Sprint Cup ====
(key) (Races in bold indicate pole position) (Races in italics indicate fastest lap)

Year	Team	Car	Class	1	2	3	4	5	6	7	8	9	10	11	12	13	14	Pos.	Points
2014	ROAL Motorsport	BMW Z4 GT3	Silver	NOG; QR; 15	NOG; CR; 11	**BRH**; **QR**; 11	BRH; CR; 10	ZAN; QR; 15	ZAN; CR; 12	**SVK**; **QR**; 5	SVK; CR; 13	ALG; QR; Ret	ALG; CR; 15	**ZOL**; **QR**; 12	ZOL; CR; 17	**BAK**; **QR**; Ret	BAK; CR; 14	2nd	154
2017	Strakka Racing	McLaren 650S GT3	Silver	MIS; QR	MIS; CR	**BRH**; **QR**; 14	BRH; CR; 11	**ZOL**; **QR**; 11	ZOL; CR; 25	HUN; QR	HUN; CR	NÜR; QR	NÜR; CR					5th	55
2026	Kessel Racing	Ferrari 296 GT3 Evo	Bronze	MIS; 1; 37	MIS; 2; 39	MAG; 1; 33	MAG; 2; 35	ZAN; 1; 40	ZAN; 2; 38	CAT; 1; 37	CAT; 2 WD							10th	16.5

==== GT World Challenge Europe Endurance Cup ====
(key) (Races in bold indicate pole position) (Races in italics indicate fastest lap)

Year	Team	Car	Class	1	2	3	4	5	6	7	Pos.	Points
2016	Scuderia Praha	Ferrari 488 GT3	Pro-Am	MNZ	SIL	LEC	SPA; 6H; 35	SPA; 12H; 25	SPA; 24H; 23	NÜR	31st	13
2017	Strakka Racing	McLaren 650S GT3	Pro	MNZ; 11	SIL; Ret	LEC; 16	SPA; 6H; 38	SPA; 12H; 44	SPA; 24H; Ret		NC	0
2017	Strakka Racing	McLaren 650S GT3	Pro-Am							CAT; 22	32nd	12
2018	Strakka Racing	Mercedes-AMG GT3	Pro	MNZ; 8	SIL; 8	LEC; 8					30th	14
2018	Strakka Racing	Mercedes-AMG GT3	Pro-Am				SPA; 6H; 8	SPA; 12H; 6	SPA; 24H; 17	CAT	10th	42
2019	Strakka Racing	Mercedes-AMG GT3	Pro	MNZ; Ret	SIL	LEC					29th	6
2019	Strakka Racing	Mercedes-AMG GT3	Pro-Am				SPA; 6H; 45	SPA; 12H; 33	SPA; 24H; 32		13th	27
2019	Black Falcon	Mercedes-AMG GT3	Silver							CAT; 7	19th	18
2021	Kessel Racing	Ferrari 488 GT3 Evo 2020	Pro-Am	MON	LEC	SPA; 6H; 52	SPA; 12H; 40	SPA; 24H; 32	NÜR	CAT	37th	2
2024	Kessel Racing	Ferrari 296 GT3	Bronze	LEC; 20	SPA; 6H; 39	SPA; 12H; 27	SPA; 24H; 43†	NÜR	MNZ; 21	JED; Ret	8th	39
2025	Kessel Racing	Ferrari 296 GT3	Bronze	LEC; 31	MNZ; 34	SPA; 6H; 60	SPA; 12H; 48	SPA; 24H; 28	NÜR; 36	**CAT**; Ret	10th	34

=== Complete Asian Le Mans Series results ===
(key) (Races in bold indicate pole position) (Races in italics indicate fastest lap)

Year	Team	Class	Car	Engine	1	2	3	4	Pos.	Points
2019–20	ACE1 Villorba Corse	LMP3	Ligier JS P3	Nissan VK50 5.0 L V8	SHA	BEN; 3	SEP; 5	BUR; 1	4th	50
2022	Kessel Racing	GT	Ferrari 488 GT3 Evo 2020	Ferrari F154CB 3.9 L Turbo V8	DUB; 1 DNS	DUB; 2 DNS	ABU; 1; 10	ABU; 2; 10	14th	2
2023	Kessel Racing	GT	Ferrari 488 GT3 Evo 2020	Ferrari F154CB 3.9 L Turbo V8	DUB; 1 NC	DUB; 2; 13	ABU; 1 DNS	ABU; 2 WD	22nd	0

^{*} Season still in progress.

=== Complete Le Mans Cup results ===
(key) (Races in bold indicate pole position) (Races in italics indicate the fastest lap)

Year	Entrant	Car	Class	1	2	3	4	5	6	7	DC	Points
2020	Kessel Racing	Ferrari 488 GT3	GT3	LEC1	SPA	LEC2	LMS; 1	LMS; 2	MNZ; 7	ALG	15th	6
2023	Kessel Racing	Ferrari 488 GT3 Evo 2020	GT3	CAT	LMS; 1; 14	LMS; 2; 14	LEC	ARA	SPA	ALG	NC†	0†
2024	Kessel Racing	Ferrari 296 GT3	GT3	CAT; 4	LEC; 4	LMS; 1; 1	**LMS**; **2**; 14	SPA; 7	MUG; 6	ALG; 3	5th	64.5
2025	Kessel Racing	Ferrari 296 GT3	GT3	CAT; 1	**LEC**; 5	LMS; 1 DNS	LMS; 2 Ret	SPA; 1	SIL; 5	ALG; 1	2nd	95
2026	Kessel Racing	Ferrari 296 GT3 Evo	GT3	CAT; Ret	LEC; 1	LMS; Ret	SPA; 2	SIL; 1	ALG; 1		3rd	93

^{†}As Fumanelli was a guest driver, he was ineligible to score championship points.
^{*} Season still in progress.

=== Complete IMSA SportsCar Championship results ===
(key) (Races in bold indicate pole position; races in italics indicate fastest lap)

Year	Entrant	Class	Chassis	Engine	1	2	3	4	5	6	7	8	9	10	Rank	Points
2025	Inception Racing	GTD	Ferrari 296 GT3	Ferrari F163CE 3.0 L Turbo V6	DAY; 18	SEB	LBH	LGA	WGL	MOS	ELK	VIR	IMS	PET	86th	153
2026	Inception Racing	GTD	Ferrari 296 GT3 Evo	Ferrari F163CE 3.0 L Turbo V6	DAY; 13	SEB	LBH	LGA	WGL	MOS	ELK	VIR	IMS	PET	72nd	202

Sporting positions
Preceded by Inaugural	Renault Sport Endurance Trophy; Champion; 2015; With: Dario Capitanio	Succeeded by Markus Palttala; Fabian Schiller
