= 2012 FIA Formula Two Championship =

Motor racing season

Seasons
- ← 2011 none →

The 2012 FIA Formula Two Championship was the fourth and the last of the FIA Formula Two Championship. The season started on 14 April at Silverstone and finished on 30 September at Monza. The 2012 calendar saw the addition of two new races.

In the opening round at Silverstone, the first pole of the season was claimed by Mathéo Tuscher, the youngest driver to have taken part in the series. Tuscher was overtaken by Christopher Zanella on the first lap of the opening race; Zanella was later joined by Mihai Marinescu and Luciano Bacheta out front, with Bacheta eventually prevailing over Zanella with series debutant Alex Fontana in third. Marinescu claimed pole position for the second race, but could not stop Bacheta taking his second win of the weekend; Fontana again completed the podium, behind Marinescu.

== Drivers ==
No.	Driver	Rounds
3	(Russia) Max Snegirev	2–5, 7–8
4	(United Kingdom) Luciano Bacheta	All
5	(India) Parthiva Sureshwaren	1–4
6	(Italy) Vittorio Ghirelli	4
7	(China) David Zhu	All
8	(Bulgaria) Plamen Kralev	All
9	(Romania) Mihai Marinescu	All
10	(Switzerland) Alex Fontana	All
11	(Iran) Kourosh Khani	1–2, 4–5
12	(Switzerland) Mathéo Tuscher	All
13	(Spain) José Luis Abadín	1
14	(Switzerland) Mauro Calamia	1–6
15	(Brazil) Victor Guerin	2
18	(United Kingdom) Dino Zamparelli	All
19	(Switzerland) Christopher Zanella	All
20	(United Kingdom) Daniel McKenzie	All
22	(Zimbabwe) Axcil Jefferies	3–8
23	(Italy) Samuele Buttarelli	1
24	(Poland) Kevin Mirocha	All
27	(Germany) Markus Pommer	All
33	(Latvia) Harald Schlegelmilch	8
35	(United Kingdom) Hector Hurst	All
51	(Slovakia) Richard Gonda	7

=== Driver changes ===
Entering/Re–Entering FIA Formula Two Championship

- Samuele Buttarelli switched from Auto GP to the championship.
- Formula Renault ALPS driver Mauro Calamia graduated into Formula Two in 2012.
- European F3 Open champion Alex Fontana graduated to the series.
- After competing in the first three rounds of the Auto GP World Series, Victor Guerin joined the series ahead of the Portimão round.
- Daniel McKenzie moved into the series from the Formula Renault 3.5 Series.
- After competing in the GP2 Series in 2011, Kevin Mirocha switched to the FIA Formula Two Championship.
- After finishing seventh in the German Formula Three Championship, Markus Pommer graduated into Formula Two in 2012.
- Formula Pilota China champion Mathéo Tuscher and eighth-placed David Zhu moved into the championship.
- Formula Renault BARC champion Dino Zamparelli as well as fourth-placed Kourosh Khani and thirteenth-placed Hector Hurst all joined the championship.

Leaving FIA Formula Two Championship

- Alex Brundle joined Carlin in the GP3 Series.
- Jack Clarke and Benjamin Lariche switched to sportscar racing, joining the European Le Mans Series and FIA GT1 World Championship respectively.
- Armaan Ebrahim moved to the United States to compete in Firestone Indy Lights.
- Jordan King switched to the Formula Renault Eurocup with Manor MP Motorsport.
- Jon Lancaster graduated to the GP2 Series with Ocean Racing Technology.

== Race calendar and results ==
An eight-race calendar was published by the FIA World Motor Sport Council on 7 December 2011.

Round		Circuit/Location	Country	Date	Pole position	Fastest lap	Winning driver	Report
1	R1	Silverstone Circuit, Northamptonshire	United Kingdom	14 April	(Switzerland) Mathéo Tuscher	(Romania) Mihai Marinescu	(United Kingdom) Luciano Bacheta	Report
1	R2	Silverstone Circuit, Northamptonshire	United Kingdom	15 April	(Romania) Mihai Marinescu	(United Kingdom) Luciano Bacheta	(United Kingdom) Luciano Bacheta	Report
2	R1	Autódromo Internacional do Algarve, Portimão	Portugal	28 April	(United Kingdom) Luciano Bacheta	(Switzerland) Mathéo Tuscher	(United Kingdom) Luciano Bacheta	Report
2	R2	Autódromo Internacional do Algarve, Portimão	Portugal	29 April	(Switzerland) Mathéo Tuscher	(United Kingdom) Luciano Bacheta	(United Kingdom) Luciano Bacheta	Report
3	R1	Nürburgring	Germany	26 May	(Romania) Mihai Marinescu	(Romania) Mihai Marinescu	(Romania) Mihai Marinescu	Report
3	R2	Nürburgring	Germany	27 May	(Switzerland) Christopher Zanella	(Switzerland) Christopher Zanella	(Switzerland) Christopher Zanella	Report
4	R1	Circuit de Spa-Francorchamps	Belgium	23 June	(Germany) Markus Pommer	(Germany) Markus Pommer	(Germany) Markus Pommer	Report
4	R2	Circuit de Spa-Francorchamps	Belgium	24 June	(United Kingdom) Luciano Bacheta	(United Kingdom) Luciano Bacheta	(United Kingdom) Luciano Bacheta	Report
5	R1	Brands Hatch, Kent	United Kingdom	14 July	(United Kingdom) Luciano Bacheta	(Romania) Mihai Marinescu	(Poland) Kevin Mirocha	Report
5	R2	Brands Hatch, Kent	United Kingdom	15 July	(Romania) Mihai Marinescu	(Switzerland) Christopher Zanella	(Romania) Mihai Marinescu	Report
6	R1	Circuit Paul Ricard, Le Castellet	France	21 July	(Switzerland) Mathéo Tuscher	(Switzerland) Christopher Zanella	(Switzerland) Mathéo Tuscher	Report
6	R2	Circuit Paul Ricard, Le Castellet	France	22 July	(Germany) Markus Pommer	(United Kingdom) Luciano Bacheta	(Germany) Markus Pommer	Report
7	R1	Hungaroring, Mogyoród	Hungary	8 September	(Poland) Kevin Mirocha	(Switzerland) Alex Fontana	(Switzerland) Alex Fontana	Report
7	R2	Hungaroring, Mogyoród	Hungary	9 September	(Germany) Markus Pommer	(Germany) Markus Pommer	(Germany) Markus Pommer	Report
8	R1	Autodromo Nazionale Monza	Italy	29 September	(Switzerland) Mathéo Tuscher	(Switzerland) Christopher Zanella	(Switzerland) Mathéo Tuscher	Report
8	R2	Autodromo Nazionale Monza	Italy	30 September	(Germany) Markus Pommer	(United Kingdom) Luciano Bacheta	(Switzerland) Christopher Zanella	Report

=== Calendar changes ===
- As in 2011, the series will take place over sixteen races at eight rounds, but the overall length of the calendar has been shortened from seven months to six.
- Two new rounds are to be introduced for the 2012 season, with races due to take place at Circuit Paul Ricard and the Hungaroring.
- After being removed from the 2011 calendar, the series will return to the Autódromo Internacional do Algarve in Portugal.
- The races at the Red Bull Ring, Circuit de Nevers Magny-Cours and Circuit de Catalunya will be discontinued to make way for new and returning races.

== Championship standings ==
Pos.	Driver	SIL (United Kingdom)		ALG (Portugal)		NÜR (Germany)		SPA (Belgium)		BRH (United Kingdom)		LEC (France)		HUN (Hungary)		MNZ (Italy)		Points
1	(United Kingdom) Luciano Bacheta	1	1	**1**	1	2	6	Ret	**1**	**3**	6	2	5	3	8	4	3	231.5
2	(Switzerland) Mathéo Tuscher	**6**	5	2	**2**	5	3	3	8	2	Ret	**1**	2	Ret	2	**1**	5	210
3	(Switzerland) Christopher Zanella	2	8	6	4	3	**1**	5	4	6	2	8	3	5	6	2	1	196
4	(Germany) Markus Pommer	8	7	4	3	9	4	**1**	2	5	5	5	**1**	NC	**1**	8	**14**	169
5	(Romania) Mihai Marinescu	4	**2**	10	Ret	**1**	2	4	12	4	**1**	7	7	Ret	7	6	4	161
6	(Poland) Kevin Mirocha	12	11	3	8	4	10	Ret	3	1	4	6	4	**2**	4	3	2	159.5
7	(Switzerland) Alex Fontana	3	3	7	10	6	5	8	5	Ret	7	14	Ret	1	5	9	6	115
8	(United Kingdom) Dino Zamparelli	9	6	8	5	13	7	7	10	Ret	3	4	6	6	3	7	7	106.5
9	(United Kingdom) Daniel McKenzie	5	4	13	6	8	8	2	18	10	8	3	8	4	9	11	10	95
10	(United Kingdom) Hector Hurst	7	10	9	7	10	11	9	9	7	12	9	Ret	Ret	14	Ret	Ret	27
11	(China) David Zhu	11	9	5	12	7	9	10	13	Ret	13	13	12	10	11	12	11	22
12	(Zimbabwe) Axcil Jefferies					14	DNS	Ret	7	8	9	10	10	Ret	10	10	8	17
13	(Latvia) Harald Schlegelmilch															5	9	12
14	(Italy) Vittorio Ghirelli							6	6									12
15	(Russia) Max Snegirev			17	15	Ret	14	Ret	16	Ret	14			7	15	14	12	6
16	(Slovakia) Richard Gonda													8	12			4
17	(Bulgaria) Plamen Kralev	15	15	15	13	11	DNS	13	17	11	Ret	12	9	9	13	13	13	4
18	(Switzerland) Mauro Calamia	14	12	12	11	15	13	12	14	9	11	11	11					2
19	(Brazil) Victor Guerin			11	9													2
20	(Iran) Kourosh Khani	10	13	14	Ret			Ret	15	Ret	10							2
21	(India) Parthiva Sureshwaren	16	14	16	14	12	12	11	11									0
22	(Spain) José Luis Abadín	13	16															0
	(Italy) Samuele Buttarelli	Ret	Ret															0
Pos	Driver	SIL (United Kingdom)		ALG (Portugal)		NÜR (Germany)		SPA (Belgium)		BRH (United Kingdom)		LEC (France)		HUN (Hungary)		MNZ (Italy)		Points

Colour	Result
Gold	Winner
Silver	Second place
Bronze	Third place
Green	Points classification
Blue	Non-points classification
Blue	Non-classified finish (NC)
Purple	Retired, not classified (Ret)
Red	Did not qualify (DNQ)
Red	Did not pre-qualify (DNPQ)
Black	Disqualified (DSQ)
White	Did not start (DNS)
White	Withdrew (WD)
White	Race cancelled (C)
Blank	Did not practice (DNP)
Blank	Did not arrive (DNA)
Blank	Excluded (EX)

**Bold** – Pole
Italics – Fastest Lap
† – Retired, but classified

- Spa Race 2 ran only four laps, and the race was red-flagged because of rain and crashes on Lap 3 that resulted in a caution. The race was subsequently red-flagged, and under the count-back rule in red flag situations, the race lasted only three laps for a total time of 9:38.007, much less than the 30 minutes required in the 40-minute race, so only half points are awarded as the race did not reach the 75% required for full points.
