= Carmen Jorda =

Spanish motor racing driver (born 1988)

- Jorda with Lotus in 2015
- Nationality: Spain
- Born: Carmen Jorda Buades; 28 May 1988 (age 38) Alcoy, Spain

Previous series
- 2021 2016 2012–14 2012–14 2011 2010 2009 2006–09 2005–06: Ultimate Cup Series; Renault Sport Trophy; GP3 Series; MRF Challenge Formula 2000; Lamborghini Super Trofeo Europe; Indy Lights; Le Mans Series; European F3 Open; Master Junior Formula

Carmen Jorda Buades (born 28 May 1988) is a Spanish motor racing driver. From 2015 to 2016, she was a development driver for the Lotus and Renault Sport Formula One teams. Her appointment by Lotus saw her become just the eleventh woman in history to be part of a Formula 1 team's driver line-up. Since 2025, she has been head of the Alpine F1 Academy.

Jorda has competed in other motor racing series such as GP3, Indy Lights and the Le Mans Series.

Jorda was born in Alcoy, Spain.

== Early life and career ==
Jorda is the daughter of former motor racing driver Jose Miguel Jorda, who introduced her to the sport at an early age. She began her career in karting, before progressing to Master Junior Formula as a teenager, and then onto Spanish Formula 3.

In the 2007 Spanish Formula 3 season, Jorda finished fourth in the Copa F300 standings – recording three podium finishes during the season. She continued to race in F3 in 2008 and 2009 – competing in the very first season of the new European F3 Open Championship.

In 2009, Jorda competed in three rounds of the Le Mans Series for the Q8 Oils Hache Team, racing in the LMP2 class alongside Máximo Cortés and then-boyfriend Fonsi Nieto.

== Indy Lights (2010) ==
On 19 January 2010, Jorda tested an Indy Lights car for Walker Racing at Sebring International Raceway and later for Andersen Racing at Barber Motorsports Park. Almost two months later, on March 8, 2010, it was announced that Jorda had signed with Andersen Racing full-time to drive in the Firestone Indy Lights Series for the 2010 season.

Jorda made her first career start in the Firestone Indy Lights Series on March 28, 2010, at the Firestone Indy Grand Prix of St. Petersburg on the Streets of St. Petersburg, finishing in eleventh position as the last car running after starting in fifteenth of sixteen cars. After completing only one lap before retiring at Barber Motorsports Park, Jorda had her best career finish in the Firestone Indy Lights Series and attained her first top-ten finish on April 18, 2010, at the Streets of Long Beach. After a three-race hiatus, missing races at the Indianapolis Motor Speedway, Iowa Speedway, and Watkins Glen International, Jorda made her return to competition at the Exhibition Place in Toronto on July 18, 2010. She finished in last place. The next weekend, at Edmonton City Centre Airport for the Edmonton Indy 100, Jorda completed only six laps in the race before encountering gearbox problems. She finished in last place for the second straight race. Jorda did not make another start for the remainder of the season and missed races at Mid-Ohio, Sonoma, Chicagoland, Kentucky, and Homestead–Miami.

== GP3 (2012–2014) ==
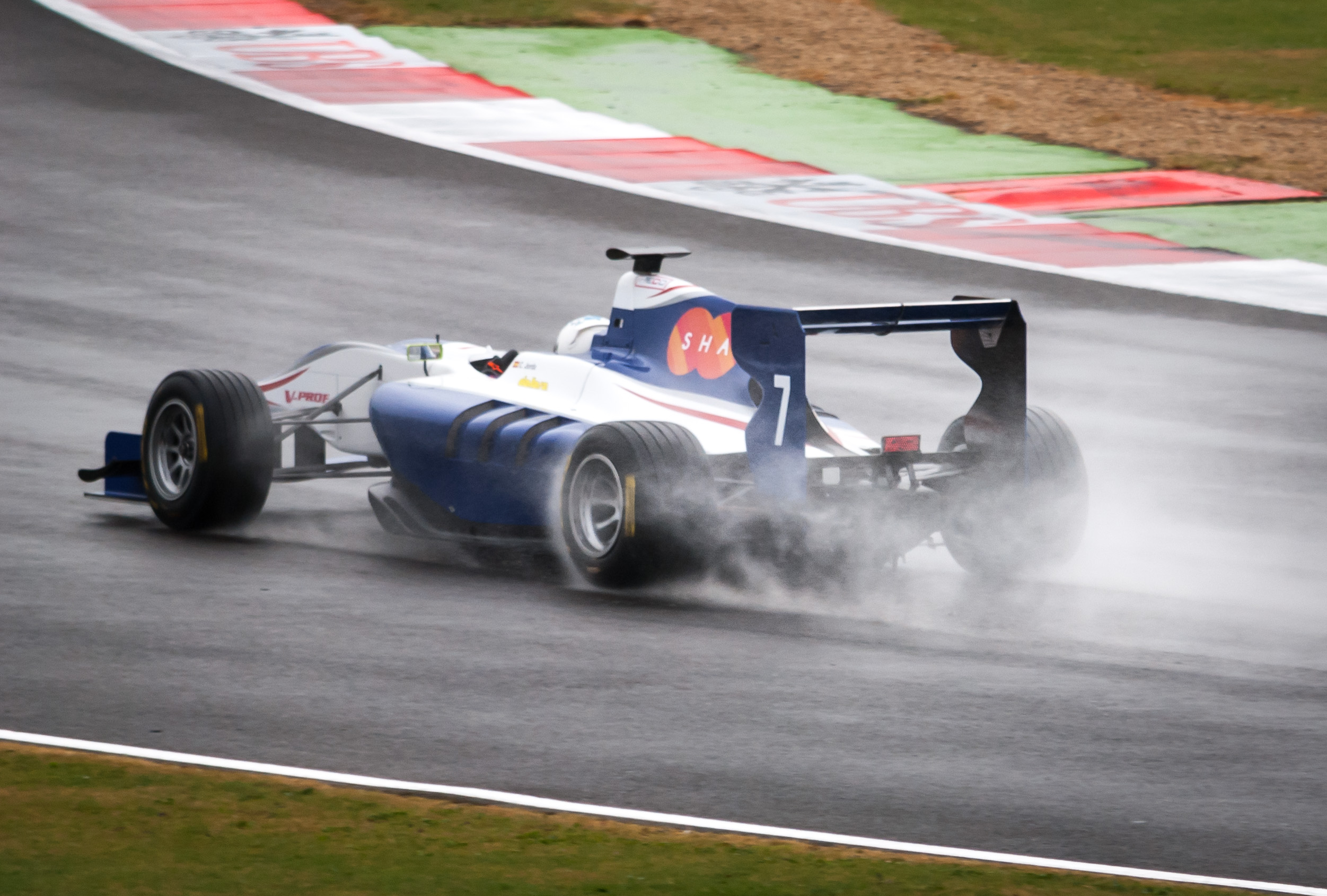
Jorda driving in GP3 for Koiranen GP

Jorda made her debut in GP3 with Ocean Racing Technology in 2012. Jorda finished the season 28th in the drivers' championship, failing to score any points. In 2013, Jorda signed with Bamboo Engineering and finished the season thirtieth in the drivers' championship, again failing to score any points. For the 2014 season, Jorda signed with Koiranen GP and finished 29th in the drivers' championship, again failing to score any points.

== Formula 1 (2015–2016) ==
On 6 February 2015, it was announced that Jorda had joined Lotus F1 as a development driver. This made her just one of 11 women in history to be included on a Formula 1 team's driver line-up. However she was only used as a sim driver.

The recruitment of Jorda was vocally criticized by some within the sport. Former rally driver and head of the FIA's Women in Motorsport commission, Michèle Mouton, described her as a "marketing gimmick", citing "Simona de Silvestro, Danica Patrick, Susie Wolff or even Beitske Visser" as better choices. Writing for Vice, James Newbold commented that the signing of Jorda had been "the wrong message", suggesting she got the position based on her looks rather than her performances in GP3, where she finished 29th in 2014, while only the series winner Alex Lynn also secured a spot with a Formula One team for 2015. In an interview with Motorsport.com, Jorda spoke of her surprise at Mouton's comments and her ambition to invite her to an F1 race so "she can better understand exactly what her plans are with Lotus". In April 2015, Jorda spoke out in favour of a separate championship for women, saying: "It's not fair that women have to compete in the same championship as men, because we're never going to become World Champion, and I think women deserve that chance." Her view was criticised by other female racing drivers, such as ADAC Formula 4 driver Sophia Flörsch and Indianapolis 500 participant Pippa Mann.

Formula 1 chief executive Bernie Ecclestone defended the appointment of Jorda, praising her in particular for being "prepared to give up what it takes". In an interview with Motorsport.com he spoke of his hopes to unearth more female talent in the future, arguing that a lack of other women racing at a comparable level makes criticism of Jorda unfair. He said: "She is very good. We asked Lotus to see and she has done a good job for them. She wants to be in F1. We have to try to find the right way, but she is not alone. There are plenty of other people." For 2016, Jorda remained with the team, now known as Renault Sport Formula One Team, after Lotus was bought out by the French manufacturer.

In early 2016, former Lotus test driver Marco Sørensen claimed that she had been as much as twelve seconds off his pace in simulator runs. This claim was rejected by Jorda, who told Spanish newspaper Diario AS that her simulator times had been "more or less within a second" of fellow Lotus driver Romain Grosjean.

== W Series (2019) ==
In 2019, Jorda entered qualifying for the W Series. However, she did not attend the evaluation day and was automatically excluded from the qualifying process.

== Alpine F1 Academy (2025-present) ==
Jorda returned to Formula One in late 2025, joining Alpine in the roles of head of F1 Academy and Qatar Airways ambassador.

== Off-track activities ==
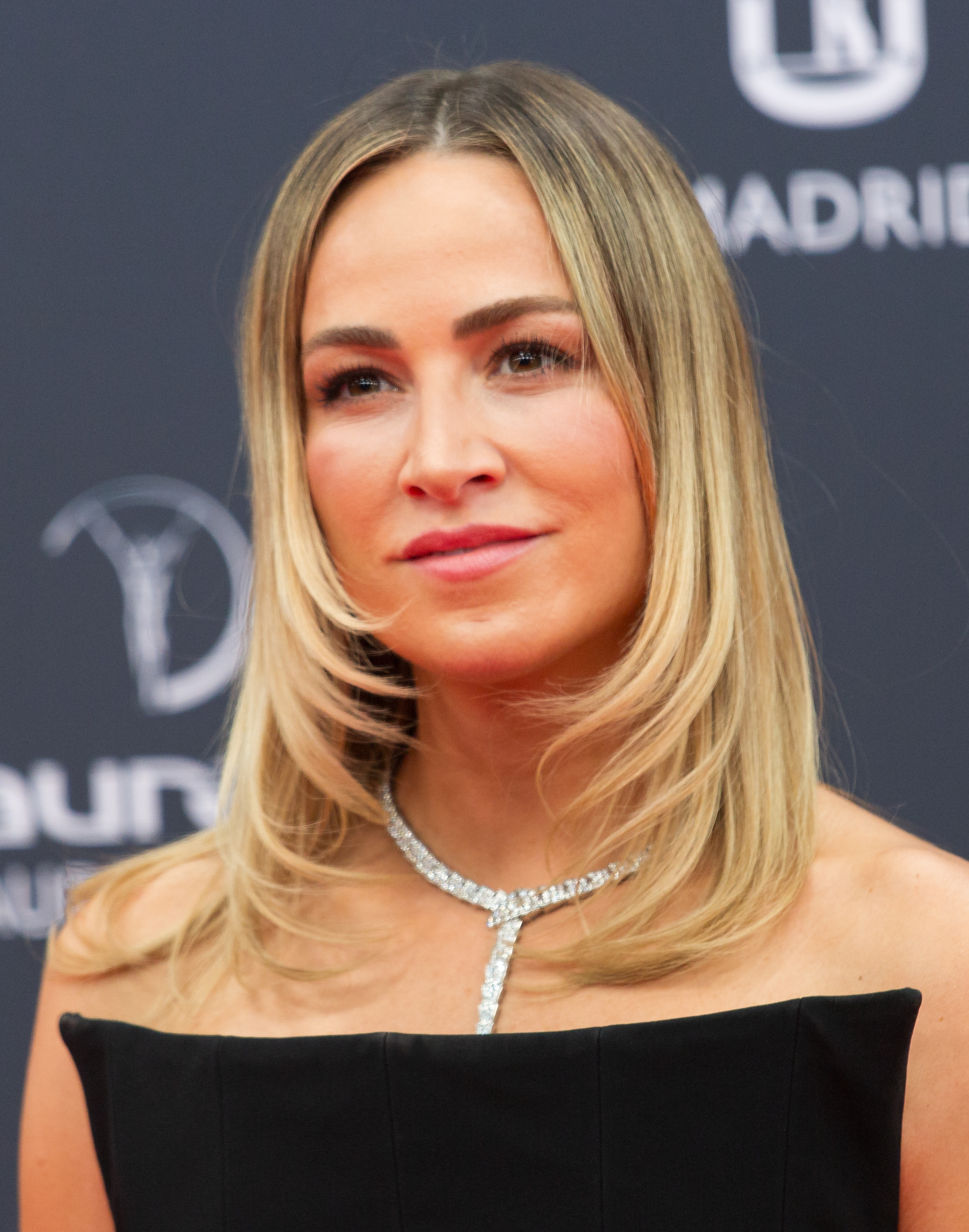
Jorda at the 2024 Laureus World Sports Awards

In December 2017, Jorda was appointed to the FIA's Women in Motorsport commission. Her appointment was greeted with derision by many successful female racing drivers. Speaking to Autosport magazine, then-current Indianapolis 500 driver and race-winning Indy Lights driver Pippa Mann commented that "it is extremely disappointing to learn that a racer with no notable results in any of the categories in which she has competed, and who believes and is quoted as saying that she does not believe we as female racers can compete, has been appointed to the FIA Women in Motorsport Commission."

In March 2023, Jorda was sued by a cosmetic surgery clinic in Pozuelo de Alarcón (Madrid) for running over a woman twice and fleeing the premises, after Jorda reportedly refused to pay the fee of €300. Jorda denied the accusations.

In December 2025, animation studio Zag announced Carmen, an animated feature film and franchise inspired by Jorda, set in women's motorsports.

== Racing record ==
=== Career summary ===
Season	Series	Team	Races	Wins	Poles	F/Laps	Podiums	Points	Position
2005	Master Junior Formula	?	18	0	0	?	0	284	7th
2006	Master Junior Formula	?	?	?	?	?	?	158	9th
2006	Spanish Formula 3 Championship - Copa F300	Escuela Profiltek	2	0	0	0	0	0	NC
2007	Spanish Formula 3 Championship	Meycom	16	0	0	0	0	0	20th
2007	Spanish Formula 3 Championship - Copa F300	Meycom	16	0	0	0	3	50	4th
2008	Spanish Formula 3 Championship	Campos F3 Racing	17	0	0	0	0	1	22nd
2008	Spanish Formula 3 Championship - Copa F306/300	Campos F3 Racing	17	0	0	0	0	21	8th
2009	European F3 Open	GTA Motor Competición	8	0	0	0	0	1	21st
2009	European F3 Open	Campos F3 Racing	8	0	0	0	0	1	21st
2009	European F3 Open - Copa F306/300	GTA Motor Competición	8	0	0	0	0	30	6th
2009	European F3 Open - Copa F306/300	Campos F3 Racing	8	0	0	0	0	30	6th
2009	Le Mans Series - LMP2	Q8 Oils Hache Team	3	0	0	0	0	0	14th
2010	Indy Lights	Andersen Racing	5	0	0	0	0	84	16th
2011	Lamborghini Super Trofeo Europe - Pro-Am	?	?	?	?	?	?	4	29th
2012	GP3 Series	Ocean Racing Technology	14	0	0	0	0	0	28th
2012–13	MRF Challenge Formula 2000	MRF Racing	4	0	0	0	0	2	23rd
2013	GP3 Series	Bamboo Engineering	16	0	0	0	0	0	30th
2013–14	MRF Challenge Formula 2000	MRF Racing	6	0	0	0	0	2	19th
2014	GP3 Series	Koiranen GP	14	0	0	0	0	0	29th
2015	Formula One	Lotus F1 Team	Development driver						
2016	Formula One	Renault Sport Formula One Team	Development driver						
2016	Renault Sport Trophy - Am	V8 Racing	8	0	0	0	0	29	9th
2016	Renault Sport Trophy - Endurance	V8 Racing	5	0	0	0	0	20	16th
2018	Gerry Marshall Trophy	?	1	0	0	0	0	N/A	17th
2018–19	Formula E	Nissan e.dams	Test driver						
2021	Ultimate Cup Series - Challenge Monoplace	CMR (F3 Regional)	6	0	0	0	0	93	15th
2022	Ultimate Cup Series - Challenge Monoplace	CMR (F3 Regional)	4	0	0	0	0	40	19th

=== Complete Spanish Formula Three Championship/European F3 Open results ===
(key) (Races in bold indicate pole position) (Races in italics indicate fastest lap)

Year	Entrant	1	2	3	4	5	6	7	8	9	10	11	12	13	14	15	16	17	D.C.	Points
2006	Escuela Profiltek	VAL; 1	VAL; 2	MAG; 1	MAG; 2	JAR; 1	JAR; 2	EST; 1	EST; 2	ALB; 1	ALB; 2	VAL; 1; 18	VAL; 2; 18	JER; 1	JER; 2	CAT; 1	CAT; 2		NC	0
2007	Meycom	JAR; 1 DNS	JAR; 2; 17	JER; 1; 17	JER; 2; 19	EST; 1; 21	EST; 2; 16	ALB; 1; 16	ALB; 2; 17	MAG; 1; 13	MAG; 2; 16	VAL; 1 Ret	VAL; 2 Ret	JER; 1 Ret	JER; 2; 12	CAT; 1; 14	CAT; 2; 15		22nd	0
2008	Campos Racing	JAR; 1; 18	JAR; 2; 10	SPA; 1; 22	SPA; 2; 18	ALB; 1; 14	ALB; 2; 12	VSC; 1; 19	VSC; 2; 16	VF1; NC	MAG; 1; 14	MAG; 2; 10	VAL; 1 Ret	VAL; 2; 20	JER; 1; 11	JER; 2; 9	CAT; 1; 13	CAT; 2; 18	22nd	1
2009	GTA Motor Competición	VAL; 1; 11	VAL; 2 Ret	JAR; 1 Ret	JAR; 2; 12	SPA; 1; 20	SPA; 2; 14	DON; 1; 18	DON; 2; 15										21st	1
2009	Campos Racing									MAG; 1; 15	MAG; 2; 9	MNZ; 1; 13	MNZ; 2; 11	JER; 1; 19	JER; 2; 13	CAT; 1; 16	CAT; 2; 12		21st	1

=== Le Mans Series results ===
Year	Entrant	Class	Chassis	Engine	1	2	3	4	5	Rank	Points
2009	Q8 Oils Hache Team	LMP2	Lucchini LMP2/08	Judd XV675 3.4 L V8	CAT	SPA	ALG; Ret	NÜR; Ret	SIL; NC	NC	0

=== American open-wheel racing results ===
(key) (Races in bold indicate pole position)

==== Indy Lights ====
Year	Team	1	2	3	4	5	6	7	8	9	10	11	12	13	Rank	Points	Ref
2010	Andersen Racing	STP; 11	ALA; 17	LBH; 10	INDY	IOW	WGL	TOR; 15	EDM; 13	MOH	SNM	CHI	KTY	HMS	**16th**	**84**	

Years	Teams	Races	Poles	Wins	Podiums (Non-win)	Top 10s (Non-podium)	Championships	Ref
1	1	5	0	0	0	1	0	

=== Complete GP3 Series results ===
(key) (Races in bold indicate pole position) (Races in italics indicate fastest lap)

Year	Entrant	1	2	3	4	5	6	7	8	9	10	11	12	13	14	15	16	17	18	D.C.	Points
2012	Ocean Racing Technology	CAT; FEA; 20	CAT; SPR; 21	MON; FEA; Ret	MON; SPR; 22	VAL; FEA; 13	VAL; SPR; Ret	SIL; FEA; DNQ	SIL; SPR; DNQ	HOC; FEA; 20	HOC; SPR; Ret	HUN; FEA; 24	HUN; SPR; Ret	SPA; FEA; 26	SPA; SPR; 23	MNZ; FEA; 21	MNZ; SPR; 19			28th	0
2013	Bamboo Engineering	CAT; FEA; 22	CAT; SPR; 18	VAL; FEA; Ret	VAL; SPR; 21	SIL; FEA; 23	SIL; SPR; 19	NÜR; FEA; DSQ	NÜR; SPR; 24	HUN; FEA; 22	HUN; SPR; 21	SPA; FEA; 19	SPA; SPR; 19	MNZ; FEA; 18	MNZ; SPR; 17	YMC; FEA; Ret	YMC; SPR; 23			30th	0
2014	Koiranen GP	CAT; FEA; Ret	CAT; SPR; Ret	RBR; FEA; 20	RBR; SPR; 21	SIL; FEA; 24	SIL; SPR; 17	HOC; FEA; Ret	HOC; SPR; 22	HUN; FEA; 25	HUN; SPR; 25	SPA; FEA; 17	SPA; SPR; Ret	MNZ; FEA; 20	MNZ; SPR; 21	SOC; FEA	SOC; SPR	YMC; FEA	YMC; SPR	29th	0

=== Complete MRF Challenge Formula 2000 Championship results ===
(key) (Races in bold indicate pole position) (Races in italics indicate fastest lap)

Year	1	2	3	4	5	6	7	8	9	10	11	12	13	14	D.C.	Points
2012–13	BIC; 1	BIC; 2	BIC; 1	BIC; 2	BIC; 3	BIC; 4	MRT; 1; 13	MRT; 2; 14	MRT; 3; 9	MRT; 4 Ret					23rd	2
2013–14	BIC; 1	BIC; 2	BHR; 1	BHR; 2	BHR; 3	BHR; 4	BHR; 1	BHR; 2	BHR; 3	BHR; 4	CHE; 1	CHE; 2	CHE; 3	CHE; 4	22nd	2
