= David Zhu =

Chinese racing driver

David Zhu Dai Wei (Chinese: 朱戴维; pinyin: Zhū Dàiwéi; born 17 August 1990) is a Chinese racing driver competing in the TCR China Touring Car Championship. He has previously competed in the FIA Formula Two Championship and various Asian-based championships, including the Formula Challenge Japan championship, over the past five years, and has scored podiums in Formula BMW Asia in 2007 and the Formula Pilota China series last year.

== 2012 FIA Formula Two season ==
On 7 March 2012, Zhu became the first Chinese driver to race in any era of F2. "My overall target is top three for the year, although it will be tough."

== Racing record ==
=== Complete FIA Formula Two Championship results ===
(key) (Races in bold indicate pole position) (Races in italics indicate fastest lap)

Year	1	2	3	4	5	6	7	8	9	10	11	12	13	14	15	16	Pos	Points
2012	SIL; 1; 11	SIL; 2; 9	ALG; 1; 5	ALG; 2; 12	NÜR; 1; 7	NÜR; 2; 9	SPA; 1; 10	SPA; 2; 13	BRH; 1 Ret	BRH; 2; 13	LEC; 1; 13	LEC; 2; 12	HUN; 1; 10	HUN; 2; 11	MNZ; 1; 12	MNZ; 2; 11	11th	22
