= José Luis Abadín =

Spanish racing driver

- Nationality: (Spain) Spanish
- Born: José Luis Abadín Iglesias; 13 March 1986 (age 40) Ourense, Spain
- Categorisation: FIA Silver

Previous series
- 2011–12 2009–10, 12 2008 2006–07: FIA Formula Two Championship; European F3 Open Championship; Spanish Formula Three; Master Junior Formula

José Luis Abadín Iglesias (Note: In this Spanish name, the first or paternal surname is Abadín and the second or maternal family name is Iglesias.) (born 13 March 1986 in Ourense) is a Spanish racing driver who competed in the FIA Formula Two Championship.

== Racing record ==
=== Career summary ===
| Season | Series | Team | Races | Wins | Poles | F/Laps | Podiums | Points | Position |
|---|---|---|---|---|---|---|---|---|---|
| 2006 | Master Junior Formula | ? | ? | ? | ? | ? | ? | ? | 11th |
| 2007 | Master Junior Formula | Emilio de Villota.com | 21 | 1 | 0 | 2 | 14 | 316 | **3rd** |
| 2008 | Spanish Formula Three Championship | Novo Team ECA | 11 | 0 | 0 | 0 | 0 | 0 | NC |
| 2009 | European F3 Open Championship | Drivex | 12 | 0 | 0 | 0 | 0 | 16 | 15th |
| 2009 | European F3 Open Championship - Copa de España | Drivex | 12 | 3 | 0 | 2 | 8 | 76 | **3rd** |
| 2010 | European F3 Open Championship | Drivex | 10 | 0 | 0 | 0 | 2 | 43 | 7th |
| 2011 | FIA Formula Two Championship | MotorSport Vision | 10 | 0 | 0 | 0 | 0 | 1 | 22nd |
| 2012 | European F3 Open Championship | Drivex | 2 | 0 | 0 | 0 | 0 | 0 | NC† |
| 2012 | FIA Formula Two Championship | Motorsport Vision | 2 | 0 | 0 | 0 | 0 | 0 | 22nd |
| 2014 | Maxi Endurance 32H - Prototype | Team Icer Brakes 1 | 1 | 1 | 1 | 0 | 1 | 0 | **1st** |
| 2014 | Maxi Endurance 32H - Cup | Bolido Racing | 1 | 1 | 1 | 0 | 1 | 0 | **1st** |
| 2015-16 | MRF Challenge Formula 2000 Championship | MRF Racing | 4 | 0 | 0 | 0 | 0 | 10 | 17th |

=== Complete FIA Formula Two Championship results ===
(key) (Races in bold indicate pole position) (Races in italics indicate fastest lap)

| Year | 1 | 2 | 3 | 4 | 5 | 6 | 7 | 8 | 9 | 10 | 11 | 12 | 13 | 14 | 15 | 16 | Pos | Points |
|---|---|---|---|---|---|---|---|---|---|---|---|---|---|---|---|---|---|---|
| 2011 | SIL; 1; 16 | SIL; 2; 18 | MAG; 1 Ret | MAG; 2; 16 | SPA; 1; 18 | SPA; 2; 11 | NÜR; 1 Ret | NÜR; 2 Ret | BRH; 1; 10 | BRH; 2; 15 | SPL; 1 Ret | SPL; 2 Ret | MON; 1 Ret | MON; 2 Ret | CAT; 1; 15 | CAT; 2; 13 | 22nd | 1 |
| 2012 | SIL; 1; 12 | SIL; 2; 11 | ALG; 1 | ALG; 2 | NÜR; 1 | NÜR; 2 | SPA; 1 | SPA; 2 | BRH; 1 | BRH; 2 | LEC; 1 | LEC; 2 | HUN; 1 | HUN; 2 | MNZ; 1 | MNZ; 2 | 22nd | 0 |
