= Samuele Buttarelli =

Italian racing driver

- Nationality: (Italy) Italian
- Born: 2 May 1992 (age 34) Genoa (Italy)

Previous series
- 2012 2011 2009–10 2009 2009 2009 2008 2008 2007: FIA Formula Two Championship; Auto GP; Italian Formula Three; European F3 Open; International Formula Master; Formula Le Mans; Italian Formula Renault 2.0; Swiss Formula Renault 2.0; Master Junior Formula

Samuele Buttarelli (born 2 May 1992 in Genoa) is a professional racing driver from Italy.

== Career ==
=== Master Junior Formula ===
Buttarelli began his single–seater career in the Spanish–based Master Junior Formula in 2007. He competed in just three of the 21 races and was subsequently classified in 23rd place.

=== Formula Renault 2.0 ===
The following year, Buttarelli stepped up to Formula Renault, competing in the Italian Formula Renault 2.0 and Swiss Formula Renault 2.0 series with Cram Competition.

In the Italian series, Buttarelli competed in the first ten races of the season before leaving the championship, taking a best result of tenth at Misano, whilst in the Swiss series, he took part in six races, with a sixth place at Hockenheim being his best race result.

=== Formula Three ===
In 2009, Buttarelli graduated to Formula Three, racing in the newly named European F3 Open Championship for the emiliodevillota.com team. He took part in the first six rounds of the season before leaving the series after the Monza round in October, where he had just secured his best race results of the season. He was classified in 18th place in the standings. In June 2009, Buttarelli joined Carlin Motorsport to contest the Masters of Formula 3 event held at Zandvoort. After qualifying on the back row of the grid, he finished as the last classified finisher in 31st position. In September 2009, he also made his debut in the Italian Formula Three Championship, racing for RC Motorsport at Imola, where he finished the two races in 18th and 17th places respectively.

For the 2010 season, Buttarelli joined Prema Powerteam to contest the Italian Formula Three Championship. After securing three podium places and a fastest lap in the first ten races, Buttarelli split with the team after the fifth round at Varano. He did, however, secure a seat alongside Daniel Mancinelli at Team Ghinzani in time for the next round of the series at Vallelunga, where he took a podium in the second race. He eventually finished the season in eighth place.

=== Formula Le Mans ===
In July 2009, Buttarelli took part in a one–off round of the Formula Le Mans series in Portimão, sharing an Oreca FLM09 with GP2 Series regular Jérôme d'Ambrosio, who was using the weekend to learn the circuit as it would host the final round of the GP2 Series season. The pair dominated the event, winning both races whilst also taking a pole position and fastest lap. However, as they were guest drivers they were ineligible for championship points.

=== International Formula Master ===
In the summer of 2009, Buttarelli took part in the International Formula Master events that supported the Hungarian Grand Prix and Belgian Grand Prix, as part of series organiser N.Technology's Talent Support Program (T.S.P). In his four races in the series, he took a best result of ninth in the Hungaroring sprint race.

== Racing record ==
=== Career summary ===
Season	Series	Team	Races	Wins	Poles	F/Laps	Podiums	Points	Position
2007	Master Junior Formula	?	3	0	0	0	0	9	23rd
2008	Italian Formula Renault 2.0	Cram Competition	10	0	0	0	0	10	28th
2008	Swiss Formula Renault 2.0	Cram Competition	6	0	0	0	0	33	14th
2009	European F3 Open Championship	emiliodevillota.com	12	0	0	0	0	9	18th
2009	International Formula Master	IFM Talent Support Program	4	0	0	0	0	0	NC†
2009	Italian Formula Three Championship	RC Motorsport	2	0	0	0	0	0	25th
2009	Formula Le Mans	DAMS	2	2	1	1	2	0	NC†
2009	Masters of Formula 3	Carlin Motorsport	1	0	0	0	0	N/A	31st
2010	Italian Formula Three Championship	Prema Powerteam	16	0	0	1	4	50	8th
2010	Italian Formula Three Championship	Team Ghinzani	16	0	0	1	4	50	8th
2022	Italian GT Championship - GT Cup	SR&R							
2023	Italian GT Championship - GT Cup	Rossocorsa							
2024	GT Winter Series - GT3	Rossocorsa Racing	3	0	0	0	0	2.495	20th
2025	Italian GT Sprint Championship - GT3	Rossocorsa Racing	2	0	0	0	0	0	NC
2026	GT Winter Series - Cup 1	Rossocorsa							
2026	Italian GT Championship Endurance Cup - GT3	Rossocorsa	4	0	0	0	0	0	NC

† – As Buttarelli was a guest driver, he was ineligible for championship points.
