= Augusto Scalbi =

Argentine racing driver

Augusto Mateo Scalbi (born July 17, 1990 in Buenos Aires Province) is a professional racing driver from Argentina. After being champion of the Italian Formula Junior 1600 in 2006, Scalbi competed in Italian Formula Three, Spanish Formula Three and European F3 Open, among other championships. He returned to Argentina in 2012. He participated in TC 2000 Championship between 2013 and 2018.
