= Simeon Ivanov (racing driver) =

Bulgarian racing driver

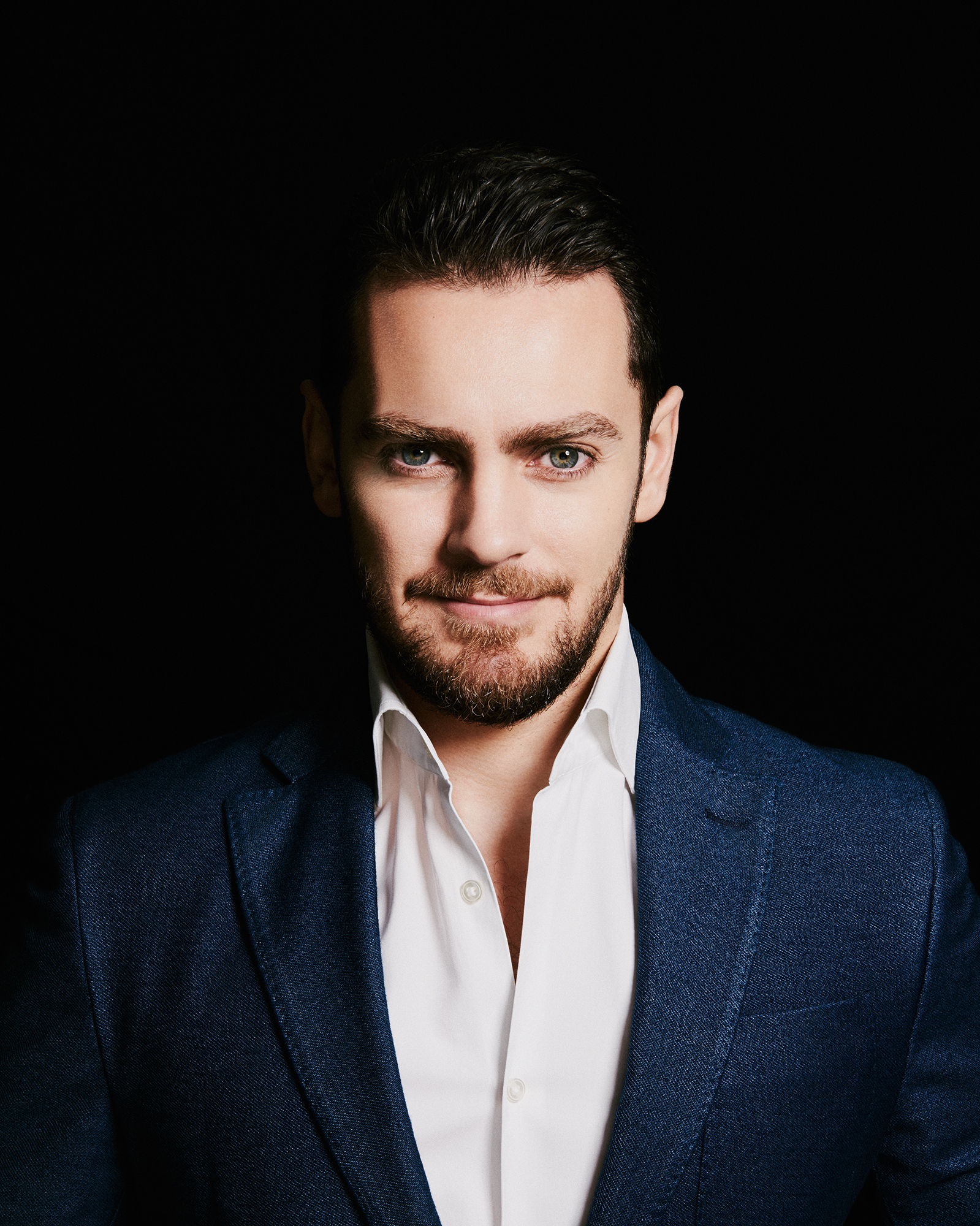
- Born: 31 March 1988 (age 38); Varna, Bulgaria
- Education: Kingston University
- Occupations: Race car driver, author, entrepreneur
- Spouse: Teodora Burgazlieva (m. 2017)
- Children: 2
- Website: www.simeonivanov.com

Simeon Ivanov (Bulgarian: Симеон Иванов) (born 31 March 1988) is a Bulgarian former professional racing driver. He competed in Formula Renault 2.0 and World Series by Renault in 2007. His racing career started at the age of 15 (2003). He won both the Bulgarian Karting Championship in 2005 and twice the South East European Karting Championship in 2004 and 2005. He was also promoted twice the Best Bulgarian Racing Driver award in the two years in which he raced in national championships. In 2014, he raced in the Bulgarian Rally and Rallysprint Championships. In 2015, he competed in GT4 Euroseries with Ginetta G50. He authored the book 0.1%: Join The Club of The Richest, Healthiest, Happiest.

== Career ==
=== Karting ===
Ivanov started his karting career at the age of 15. He won his first podium in his first race and the first win only two races later. In 2004 (his first full year as a racing driver), he raced in two karting championships - Bulgarian and South East European. He became the first karting champion of South East Europe and got second place in the national championship in class KF2. At the end of the season, all racing teams voted Ivanov to become the holder of the Best Racing Driver award.

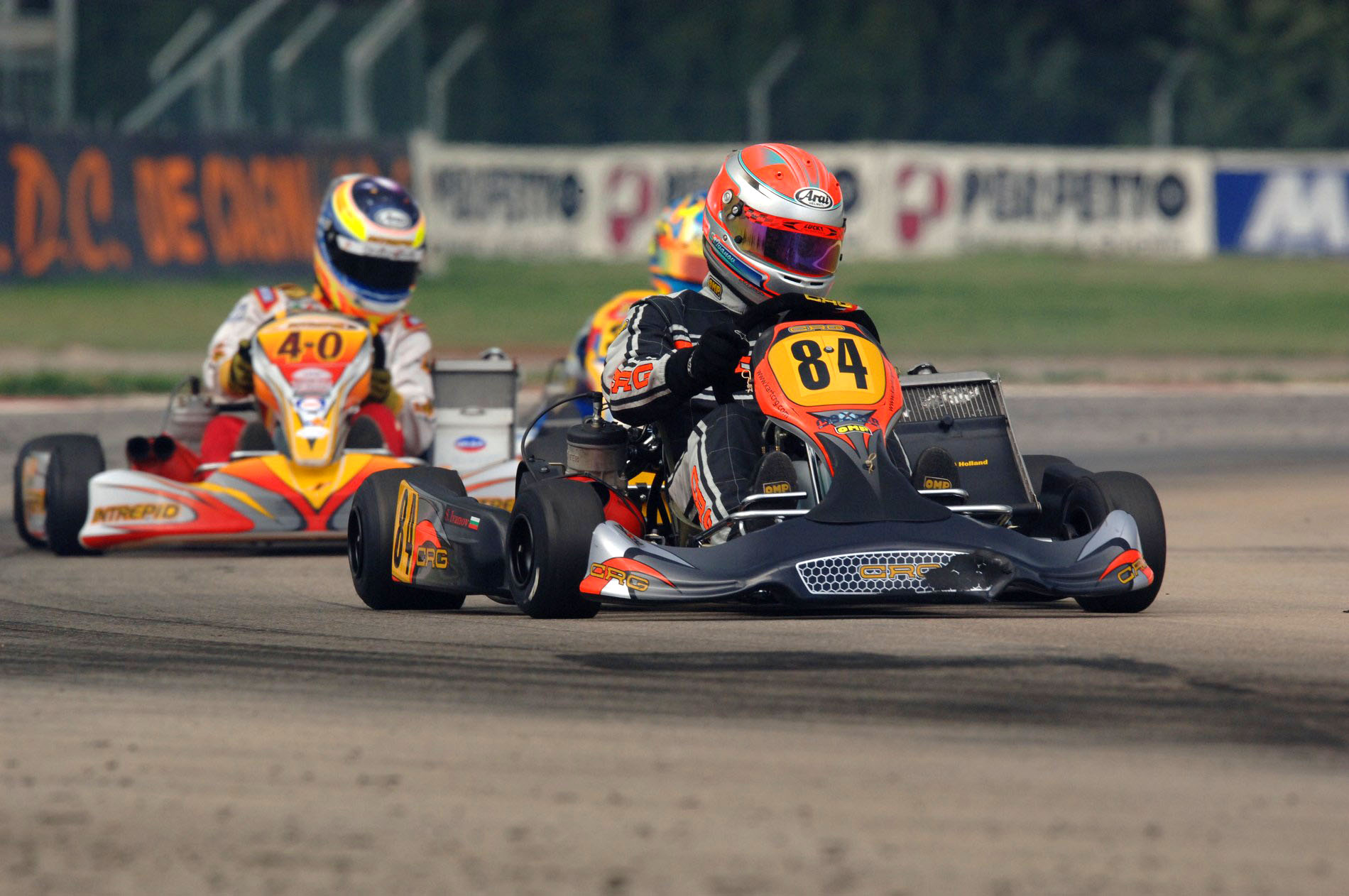
Simeon Ivanov in the 2006 Italian Open Masters at La Conca

2005 was even more successful for the Bulgarian pilot. He completed a total of 14 races in the Bulgarian Karting Championship and the South East European Championship, scoring 12 pole positions, 13 wins and one second position. He won both Championship titles and was again promoted for the Best Bulgarian Racing Driver. In the end of the year, Ivanov took part in the Kerpen Winter Cup, Germany. He raced partnered by CRG Holland team. After finishing fourth and second in the two semifinals, he was pushed off the racing track at the final but still managed to get to the podium in fifth place.

In 2006, Ivanov raced together with CRG Holland in the Italian Open Masters and at the Lonato Winter Cup. The top result of the season was reaching the finals at the Lonato race out of 140 racing drivers. At the end of the year, Ivanov made his first Formula Renault 2.0 test.

=== Formula Renault 2.0 ===
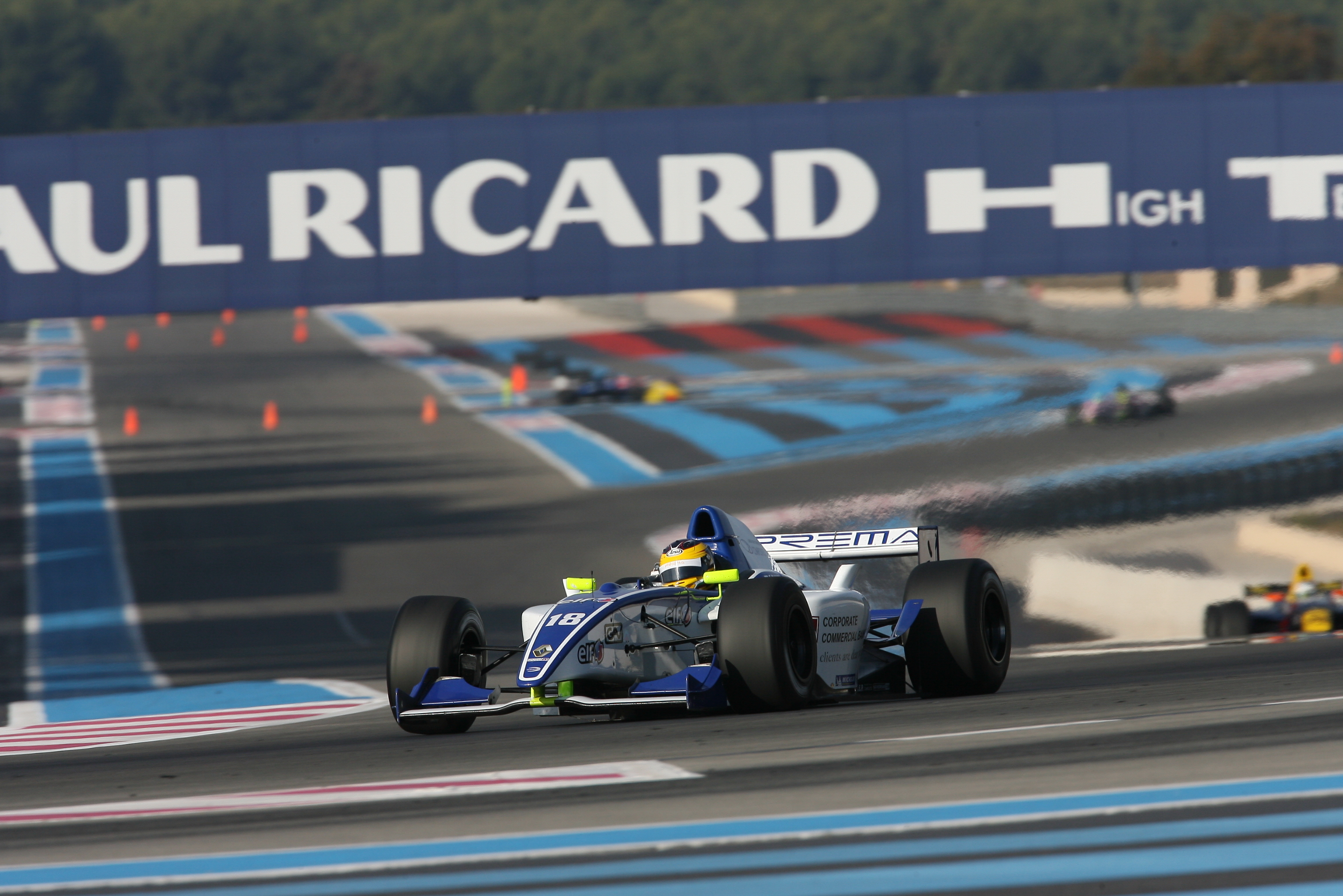
Simeon Ivanov in the 2007 Formula Renault 3.5 Series at Circuit Paul Ricard

After completing tests for CO2 Racing and Prema Powerteam during the winter season, Ivanov finally signed a contract with BVM Minardi to race a complete 2007 season in Formula Renault 2.0 Italian Championship and three races in Formula Renault 2.0 European Championship.

=== Formula Renault 3.5 ===
After the end of the 2007 season, Ivanov signed a contract with Prema Powerteam to take part in the World Series by Renault official testing days at the Circuit Paul Ricard.

After the tests in Paul Ricard, Ivanov decided to put an end on his racing career. He moved on to complete a Business Management degree from Kingston University London.

== Personal life ==
Ivanov married Teodora Burgazlieva in 2017. They have two children: Ryan and Emma.

== Complete Eurocup Formula Renault 2.0 results ==
(key) (Races in bold indicate pole position; races in italics indicate fastest lap)

Year	Entrant	1	2	3	4	5	6	7	8	9	10	11	12	13	14	DC	Points
2007	BVM Minardi Team	ZOL; 1	ZOL; 2	NÜR; 1; 30	NÜR; 2 Ret	HUN; 1 Ret	HUN; 2 Ret	DON; 1	DON; 2	MAG; 1	MAG; 2	EST; 1	EST; 2	CAT; 1; 26	CAT; 2; 31	47th	0
