= Michele Faccin =

Italian racing driver (born 1990)

- Nationality: (Italy) Italian
- Born: 19 January 1990 (age 36) Padua (Italy)

European F3 Open Championship career
- Debut season: 2009
- Current team: Q8 Oils Hache Team
- Starts: 10
- Wins: 0
- Poles: 0
- Fastest laps: 0
- Best finish: 18th in 2009

Previous series
- 2009 2009 2008 2007 2007–08 2006 2006: Italian Formula Three; British Formula Three; Eurocup Formula Renault 2.0; Swiss Formula Renault 2.0; Italian Formula Renault 2.0; Formula Azzurra; Italian FR2.0 Winter Series

Michele "Miky" Faccin (born 19 January 1990, in Padua) is an Italian former professional racing driver.

== Career ==
=== Karting ===
Faccin began his motorsport career in karting back in 2002, and two years later finished fourth in the Italian Championship ICA Junior class. In 2005, he finished as runner-up in the same category whilst also competing in the Italian Open Masters and European Championship ICA Junior classes.

=== Formula Azzurra ===
In 2006, aged just sixteen years old, Faccin made his debut in single-seaters, racing in the Formula Azzurra series in his native Italy. He took four podium places in thirteen races, including one victory, to end the season in fifth place.

=== Formula Renault ===
Towards the end of 2006, Faccin graduated to Formula Renault, taking part in the Italian Formula Renault 2.0 Winter Series for CO_{2} Motorsport. He once again finished fifth in the championship, behind Mirko Bortolotti and Jaime Alguersuari.

The following year, Faccin contested a full season in the series, finishing in twentieth place. He also took part in the Swiss Formula Renault 2.0 championship. Despite missing the round at Varano, he finished fifth in the championship, taking race wins at Dijon and Most.

In 2008, Faccin took part in both the Italian Formula Renault 2.0 and Eurocup Formula Renault 2.0 championships, racing for the Jenzer Motorsport team. In the Italian series, he finished as runner-up to teammate Pål Varhaug, taking four podium places including race wins at Vallelunga and a double victory at Spa-Francorchamps. In the Eurocup, he finished in the points on seven occasions and despite not recording a top three finish, he was classified in ninth place in the standings.

=== Formula Three ===
2009 saw Faccin make the step up to Formula Three, racing in the newly named European F3 Open Championship for the Q8 Oils Hache Team. Racing in the secondary Copa de España class, for the previous generation Dallara F306 chassis, Faccin took part in ten of the first twelve races before missing the final four races of the season. He took four class podiums, including two at Donington Park, to finish fifth in the Copa de España standings, whilst in the main championship he finished in eighteenth place.

In May 2009, he made his debut in the Italian Formula Three Championship, driving for the Corbetta Competizioni team at the opening round of the series at Adria International Raceway. He took the final points-scoring position of tenth in race one before retiring from the second event.

In August 2009, Faccin made an appearance in the British Formula Three Championship round at Silverstone. Driving in the National Class for Team West-Tec, he finished the two races in eighteenth and twentieth places respectively, which equated to fourth place in the National Class on each occasion.

=== Other series ===
In November 2009, Faccin tested a World Series by Renault car for the first time, driving for the Pons Racing team alongside Nelson Panciatici at the Circuit de Catalunya. Over the course of the two-day test, he completed a total of 174 laps, recording a best time of 1:35.949 on the final day.

== Racing record ==
=== Career summary ===
| Season | Series | Team | Races | Wins | Poles | F/Laps | Podiums | Points | Position |
|---|---|---|---|---|---|---|---|---|---|
| 2006 | Formula Azzurra | PKF Racing | 13 | 1 | 0 | 1 | 4 | 64 | 5th |
| 2006 | Italian Formula Renault 2.0 (Winter Series) | CO_{2} Motorsport | 4 | 0 | 0 | ? | 0 | 64 | 5th |
| 2007 | Italian Formula Renault 2.0 | CO_{2} Motorsport | 14 | 0 | 0 | 0 | 0 | 29 | 20th |
| 2007 | Swiss Formula Renault 2.0 | CO_{2} Motorsport | 10 | 2 | 2 | 5 | 5 | 168 | 5th |
| 2008 | Eurocup Formula Renault 2.0 | Jenzer Motorsport | 14 | 0 | 0 | 0 | 0 | 33 | 9th |
| 2008 | Italian Formula Renault 2.0 | Jenzer Motorsport | 14 | 3 | 4 | 4 | 4 | 271 | **2nd** |
| 2009 | European F3 Open | Q8 Oils Hache Team | 10 | 0 | 0 | 0 | 0 | 9 | 18th |
| 2009 | European F3 Open (Copa de España) | Q8 Oils Hache Team | 10 | 0 | 1 | 2 | 4 | 37 | 5th |
| 2009 | Italian Formula Three | Corbetta Competizioni | 2 | 0 | 0 | 0 | 0 | 1 | 19th |
| 2009 | British Formula Three (National Class) | Team West-Tec | 2 | 0 | 0 | 0 | 0 | 20 | 7th |

=== Complete Eurocup Formula Renault 2.0 results ===
(key) (Races in bold indicate pole position; races in italics indicate fastest lap)

| Year | Entrant | 1 | 2 | 3 | 4 | 5 | 6 | 7 | 8 | 9 | 10 | 11 | 12 | 13 | 14 | DC | Points |
|---|---|---|---|---|---|---|---|---|---|---|---|---|---|---|---|---|---|
| 2008 | Jenzer Motorsport | SPA; 1; 8 | SPA; 2; 8 | SIL; 1; 6 | SIL; 2; 4 | HUN; 1; 23 | HUN; 2; 7 | NÜR; 1; 15 | NÜR; 2; 15 | LMS; 1; 13 | LMS; 2; 16 | EST; 1; 14 | EST; 2; 9 | CAT; 1; 4 | CAT; 2; 12 | 9th | 33 |
