= 2002 Spanish Formula Three Championship =

Motor racing competition

Seasons
- ← 2001 2003 →

The 2002 Spanish Formula Three Championship was the second Spanish Formula Three season. It began on 7 April at Albacete and ended on 10 November at Circuit de Catalunya in Montmeló after thirteen races. Marcel Costa was crowned series champion.

== Teams and drivers ==
- All teams were Spanish-registered. All cars were powered by Toyota engines, Dallara F300 chassis and Dunlop tyres.

Team	No.	Driver	Rounds
Racing Engineering	1	(Portugal) Álvaro Parente	All
Racing Engineering	2	(Spain) Andy Soucek	All
Racing Engineering	3	(France) Lucas Lasserre	All
Meycom Sport	4	(Spain) Álvaro Espinosa	1–3
Meycom Sport	4	(Spain) Daniel Martín	4–7
Meycom Sport	5	(Spain) María de Villota	All
RDS By Elide Racing	6	(Spain) Diego Puyo	1–3
RDS By Elide Racing	6	(Spain) Alejandro Núñez	4–7
RDS By Elide Racing	7	(Spain) Pedro Barral	All
RDS By Elide Racing	8	(Uruguay) Fernando Rama	1–3
E.V. Racing	9	(Spain) Marcel Costa	All
E.V. Racing	10	(Spain) Ricardo Ferrando	4–7
Azteca Motorsport	11	(Spain) Sergio Hernández	All
Azteca Motorsport	12	(United States) Philip Giebler	1–6
GTA Motor Competición	14	(Spain) Jordi Palomares	1–3
GTA Motor Competición	14	(Spain) Borja García	4–7
GTA Motor Competición	15	(Argentina) Ianina Zanazzi	1–3
GTA Motor Competición	15	(Austria) Mathias Lauda	4
GTA Motor Competición	15	(Spain) Celso Míguez	5–7
Skualo Competición	16	(Spain) Emilio de Villota Jr.	All
Skualo Competición	17	(Spain) Alejandro Núñez	1–3
ECA Racing	18	(Portugal) Miguel Ramos	1–3
ECA Racing	18	(Uruguay) Fernando Rama	6
ECA Racing	19	(Spain) Paul Robinson	All
G-Tec	20	(Portugal) Felipe Silva	All
G-Tec	21	(France) Jeremy Toti	1–2
G-Tec	21	(Portugal) Ricardo Teodósio	3
G-Tec	21	(United Kingdom) Adam Langley-Khan	4
G-Tec	21	(Portugal) Pedro Salvador	5
G-Tec	21	(Portugal) Miguel Ramos	6
G-Tec	21	(United States) Philip Giebler	7

== Calendar ==
Round		Circuit	Date	Pole position	Fastest lap	Winning driver	Winning team
1	R1	(Spain) Circuito de Albacete, Albacete	7 April	(Spain) Andy Soucek	(Spain) Marcel Costa	(France) Lucas Lasserre	Racing Engineering
1	R2	(Spain) Circuito de Albacete, Albacete	7 April	(Portugal) Álvaro Parente	(United States) Philip Giebler	(Portugal) Álvaro Parente	Racing Engineering
2	R1	(Spain) Circuito de Jerez, Jerez de la Frontera	26 May	(Spain) Marcel Costa	(Spain) Marcel Costa	(Spain) Marcel Costa	E.V. Racing
2	R2	(Spain) Circuito de Jerez, Jerez de la Frontera	26 May	(Spain) Marcel Costa	(Spain) Marcel Costa	(Spain) Marcel Costa	E.V. Racing
3	R1	(Portugal) Circuito do Estoril, Estoril	30 June	(Portugal) Felipe Silva	(Portugal) Álvaro Parente	(France) Lucas Lasserre	Racing Engineering
3	R2	(Portugal) Circuito do Estoril, Estoril	30 June	(United States) Philip Giebler	(France) Lucas Lasserre	(France) Lucas Lasserre	Racing Engineering
4		(Spain) Circuit Ricardo Tormo, Valencia	22 September	(Spain) Borja García	(Spain) Borja García	(Spain) Borja García	GTA Motor Competición
5	R1	(Spain) Circuito de Jerez, Jerez de la Frontera	7 October	(Spain) Borja García	(Spain) Daniel Martín	(Spain) Borja García	GTA Motor Competición
5	R2	(Spain) Circuito de Jerez, Jerez de la Frontera	7 October	(Spain) Borja García	(Spain) Daniel Martín	(Spain) Borja García	GTA Motor Competición
6	R1	(Spain) Circuito del Jarama, Madrid	13 October	(Spain) Daniel Martín	(Spain) Borja García	(Spain) Borja García	GTA Motor Competición
6	R2	(Spain) Circuito del Jarama, Madrid	13 October	(Spain) Daniel Martín	(Spain) Daniel Martín	(Spain) Daniel Martín	Meycom Sport
7	R1	(Spain) Circuit de Catalunya, Barcelona	10 November	(Spain) Borja García	(Spain) Borja García	(Spain) Borja García	GTA Motor Competición
7	R2	(Spain) Circuit de Catalunya, Barcelona	10 November	(Spain) Daniel Martín	(Spain) Daniel Martín	(Spain) Borja García	GTA Motor Competición

== Standings ==
=== Drivers' standings ===
- Points were awarded as follows:

Pos	1	2	3	4	5	6	7	8	9	10	11	12	13	14	15	PP	FL
Pts	20	18	16	14	12	10	9	8	7	6	5	4	3	2	1	**1**	2

Pos	Driver	ALB (Spain)		JER (Spain)		EST (Portugal)		VAL (Spain)	JER (Spain)		JAR (Spain)		CAT (Spain)		Pts
1	(Spain) Marcel Costa	2	3	**1**	**1**	4	3	4	3	3	3	3	DNS	DNS	190
2	(France) Lucas Lasserre	1	6	3	3	1	1	7	2	Ret	6	6	3	3	174
3	(Spain) Borja García							**1**	**1**	**1**	1	2	**1**	1	148
4	(Spain) Daniel Martín							2	5	2	**2**	**1**	2	**2**	133
5	(Portugal) Álvaro Parente	6	**1**	5	5	5	10	10	Ret	4	8	4	8	4	133
6	(United States) Philip Giebler	3	2	2	Ret	2	**14**	3	Ret	7	7	16	9	6	126
7	(Portugal) Felipe Silva	4	8	Ret	15	**3**	2	8	7	DNS	5	5	4	5	125
8	(Spain) Andy Soucek	**9**	4	Ret	4	6	5	5	4	5	11	10	6	Ret	117
9	(Spain) Sergio Hernández	5	7	4	2	7	4	9	6	Ret	Ret	15	10	7	109
10	(Spain) Paul Robinson	12	10	6	10	Ret	8	11	10	11	4	8	14	Ret	74
11	(Spain) María de Villota	13	12	8	8	9	11	13	8	8	12	7	12	11	69
12	(Uruguay) Fernando Rama	7	5	7	6	8	6				10	14			66
13	(Spain) Celso Míguez								9	7	9	9	5	Ret	43
14	(Spain) Diego Puyo	14	9	10	7	11	9								36
15	(Spain) Alejandro Núñez	Ret	Ret	Ret	13	13	16	14	13	12	13	13	11	10	32
16	(Spain) Pedro Barral	15	15	Ret	9	Ret	DNS	6	Ret	Ret	Ret	12	Ret	8	31
17	(Spain) Emilio de Villota Jr.	16	11	Ret	DNS	12	Ret	Ret	11	13	14	Ret	7	Ret	27
18	(Portugal) Miguel Ramos	11	16	9	11	DNS	DNS	Ret			14	11			24
19	(Spain) Ricardo Ferrando							12	14	10	Ret	DNS	13	9	22
20	(France) Jeremy Toti	8	17	12	14										14
21	(Spain) Jordi Palomeras	10	14	Ret	DNS	Ret	12								12
22	(Argentina) Ianina Zanazzi	DNS	13	Ret	Ret	10	13								12
23	(Portugal) Pedro Salvador								12	9					11
24	(Spain) Alvaro Espinosa	17	18	11	12	Ret	15								10
25	(Portugal) Ricardo Teodósio					Ret	7								9
	(United Kingdom) Adam Langley-Khan							Ret							0
	(Austria) Mathias Lauda							Ret							0
Pos	Driver	ALB (Spain)		JER (Spain)		EST (Portugal)		VAL (Spain)	JER (Spain)		JAR (Spain)		CAT (Spain)		Pts

Colour	Result
Gold	Winner
Silver	Second place
Bronze	Third place
Green	Points classification
Blue	Non-points classification
Blue	Non-classified finish (NC)
Purple	Retired, not classified (Ret)
Red	Did not qualify (DNQ)
Red	Did not pre-qualify (DNPQ)
Black	Disqualified (DSQ)
White	Did not start (DNS)
White	Withdrew (WD)
White	Race cancelled (C)
Blank	Did not practice (DNP)
Blank	Did not arrive (DNA)
Blank	Excluded (EX)

**Bold** – Pole
Italics – Fastest Lap

=== Teams' standings ===
- Points were awarded as follows:

Pos	1	2	3	4	5
Points	10	8	6	4	3

Pos	Team	Car No.	ALB (Spain)		JER (Spain)		EST (Portugal)		VAL (Spain)	JER (Spain)		JAR (Spain)		CAT (Spain)		Pts
1	Racing Engineering	1	6	1	5	5	5	10	10	Ret	4	8	4	8	4	108
1	Racing Engineering	2	9	4	Ret	4	6	5	5	4	5	11	10	6	Ret	108
1	Racing Engineering	3	1	6	3	3	1	1	7	2	Ret	6	6	3	3	108
2	E.V. Racing	9	2	3	1	1	4	3	4	3	3	3	3	DNS	DNS	72
2	E.V. Racing	10							12	14	10	Ret	DNS	13	9	72
3	GTA Motor Competición	14	10	14	Ret	DNS	Ret	12	1	1	1	1	2	1	1	71
3	GTA Motor Competición	15	DNS	13	Ret	Ret	10	13	Ret	9	7	9	9	5	Ret	71
4	Azteca Motorsport	11	5	7	4	2	7	4	9	6	Ret	Ret	15	10	7	55
4	Azteca Motorsport	12	3	2	2	Ret	2	14	3	Ret	7	7	16			55
5	Meycom Sport	4	17	18	11	12	Ret	15	2	5	2	2	1	2	2	53
5	Meycom Sport	5	13	12	8	8	9	11	13	8	8	12	7	12	11	53
6	G-Tec	20	4	8	Ret	15	**3**	2	8	7	DNS	5	5	4	5	31
6	G-Tec	21	8	17	12	14	Ret	7	Ret	12	9	14	11	9	6	31
7	ECA Racing	18	11	16	9	11	DNS	DNS	Ret			10	14			4
7	ECA Racing	19	12	10	6	10	Ret	8	11	10	11	4	8	14	Ret	4
8	RDS by Elide Racing	6	14	9	10	7	11	9	14	13	12	13	13	11	10	3
8	RDS by Elide Racing	7	15	15	Ret	9	Ret	DNS	6	Ret	Ret	Ret	12	Ret	8	3
8	RDS by Elide Racing	8	7	5	7	6	8	6								3
9	Skualo Competición	16	16	11	Ret	DNS	12	Ret	Ret	11	13	14	Ret	7	Ret	0
9	Skualo Competición	17	Ret	Ret	Ret	13	13	16								0
Pos	Team	Car No.	ALB (Spain)		JER (Spain)		EST (Portugal)		VAL (Spain)	JER (Spain)		JAR (Spain)		CAT (Spain)		Pts
