= Teo Martín Motorsport =

Spanish motor racing team

(Spain) Teo Martín Motorsport
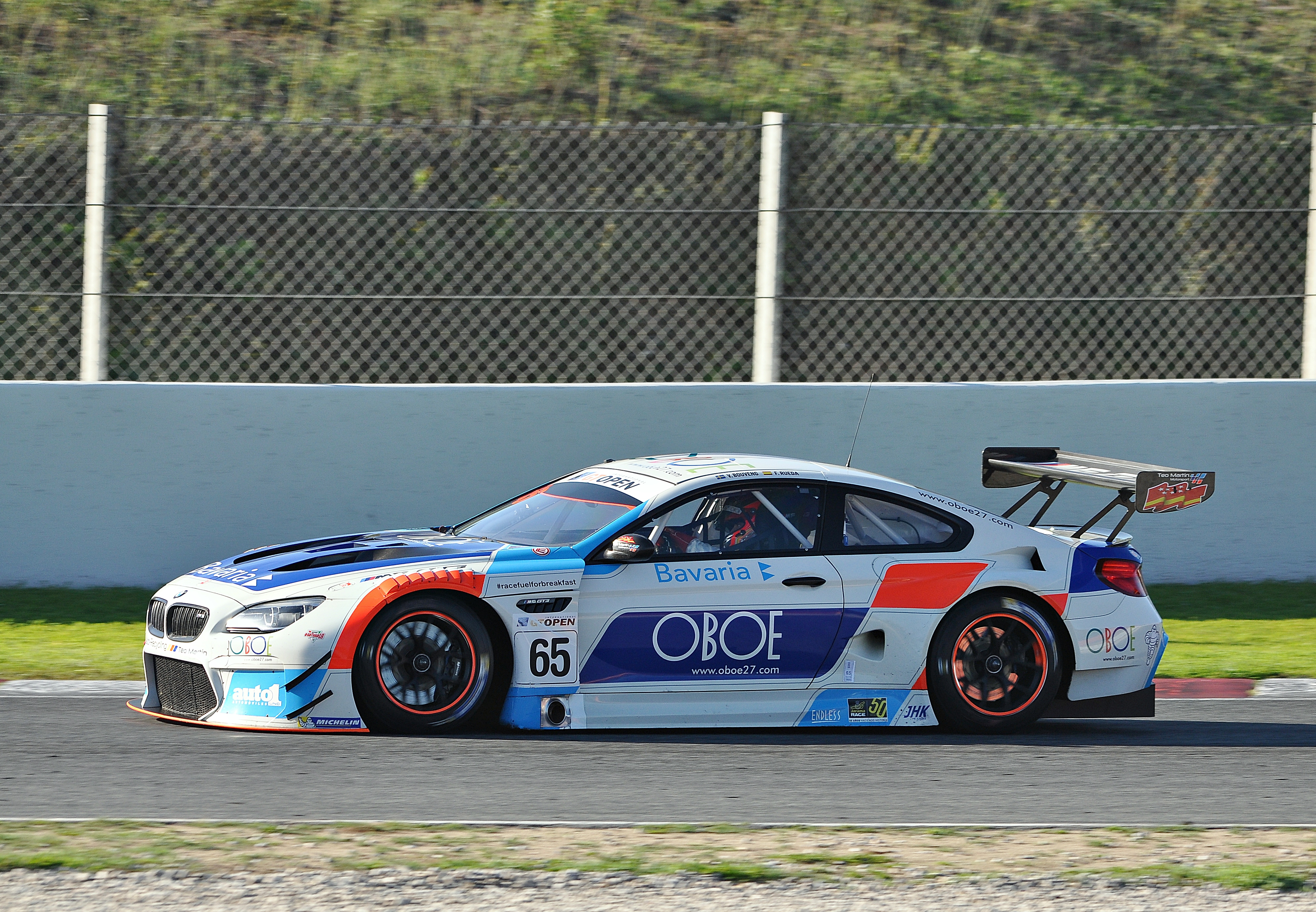
- Founded: 1988 (as Teo Martín Motorsport); 1997 (as EV Racing)
- Founder(s): Teo Martín; Emilio de Villota (as EV Racing)
- Base: Madrid, Spain
- Team principal(s): Emilio de Villota Jr.
- Current series: F4 Spanish Championship; TCR Europe Touring Car Series
- Former series: Superleague Formula; Formula V8 3.5; Euroformula Open Championship; International GT Open
- Current drivers: (France) Lola Lovinfosse (Spain) Daniel Nogales (Portugal) Manuel Espírito Santo (Spain) Daniel Maciá (Spain) Alejandro Geppert
- Teams' Championships: International GT Open: 2016
- Drivers' Championships: Spanish Formula Three Championship: 2002: Marcel Costa; International GT Open: 2015: Álvaro Parente/Miguel Ramos
- Website: http://teomartinmotorsport.com/en/

Teo Martín Motorsport formerly EV Racing, Emilio de Villota Motorsport, is a Spanish motor racing team, run by Teo Martín and former racing driver Emilio de Villota.

== History ==
=== E.V. Racing ===
After retiring from racing, Emilio de Villota formed his own team in 1997, under the name E.V. Racing. The team began by competing in the 2001 Spanish Formula Three Championship, with Daniel Martín, Álvaro Parente, Miguel Ramos and Paul Robinson as drivers. Robinson brought two podiums to the team at Jarama and Estoril. The next year was the most successful in the team's history. Marcel Costa grab the championship title with two wins at Jerez. For the next year the de Villota's son Emilio de Villota Jr. joined team as well as Andy Soucek, who was the only driver to collect podiums for the team in the season. In 2004 the team continued with Andy Soucek, but de Villota Sr. sells its stake in EV Racing and creates Master Junior Formula series.

=== emiliodevillota.com ===
In 2007 the team returned to the Spanish Formula Three Championship with Bruno Méndez, who had podiums at Estoril and Jerez. In the final year in the championship under Spanish Formula Three branding, the team had Will Bratt as their only full-time driver. He achieved five podiums to finish the season in seventh in the series standings. In 2009 the main driver of the team was Sergio Canamasas, who had three podiums and ended season in sixth.

=== De Villota Motorsport ===
For 2010 the team had signed Fernando Monje and Juan Carlos Sistos, who returned three podium finishes for the team. Also during the 2010 season the team participated in Superleague Formula with cars representing Sevilla FC, AS Roma and Sporting CP. The team continued their collaboration with Sistos in 2011, when he scored four podiums at Algarve, Monza, Jerez and Barcelona. Sistos remained with the team for the third consecutive season and achieved the first win since their return in 2007. But the most successful driver of the team in the season was Måns Grenhagen, who fight for the title with RP Motorsport's drivers Niccolò Schirò and Gianmarco Raimondo.

=== EmiliodeVillota Motorsport ===
In 2013 the team had four drivers in the main championship and two drivers in the Cup class. Hector Hurst won the race at Nürburgring and finished seventh in the standings ahead of his teammate Yarin Stern. In 2014 the championship was rebranded as Euroformula Open and the team signed Yu Kanamaru and Che One Lim as their full-time drivers. Kanamaru had four podiums. He stayed in the team for 2015, but this time his teammate was Jose Manuel Vilalta. Kanamaru improved to seven podiums and won race at Silverstone.

=== Teo Martin Motorsport ===
Also in 2015, Teo Martín Motorsport was re-established having once been dominant in the Spanish Supertouring Championship, and joined International GT Open championship with McLaren 650S and Álvaro Parente and Miguel Ramos as their drivers. The team won both Championship and Pro-Am standings from their first attempt.

For 2016, Teo Martín purchased DAMS' World Series Formula V8 3.5 entry and cars. Also he joined forces with Emilio de Villota Jr. (who became team principal) and merged teams. Also in 2016 they switched to BMW M6 GT3 cars in the International GT Open, scoring four wins with the both cars, to clinch their first teams' title.

2019 would be the last season for the team in Euroformula, with the sole focus on the 2020 International GT Open season, running three McLaren 720S GT3.

However, a return to single seaters was confirmed with the announcement that the team was joining the 2021 F4 Spanish Championship grid, with Jorge Campos and Filip Jenić.

== Former series results ==
=== F4 Spanish Championship ===
Year	Car	Drivers	Races	Wins	Poles	F/Laps	Podiums	Points	D.C.	T.C.
2021	Tatuus F4-T014	(Serbia) Filip Jenić	21	1	0	0	2	50	12th	6th
2021	Tatuus F4-T014	(Mexico) Jorge Campos	18	0	0	0	0	3	22nd	6th
2021	Tatuus F4-T014	(Austria) Oliver Michl	18	0	0	0	0	2	23rd	6th
2022	Tatuus F4-T421	(Portugal) Manuel Espírito Santo†	21	0	0	0	2	59	12th	10th
2022	Tatuus F4-T421	(Spain) Daniel Nogales‡	21	0	0	0	0	26	14th	10th
2022	Tatuus F4-T421	(France) Lola Lovinfosse	12	0	0	0	0	0	37th	10th
2022	Tatuus F4-T421	(Spain) Daniel Maciá	3	0	0	0	0	0	38th	10th

† Espírito Santo drove for Campos Racing from round 3 onwards.

‡ Nogales drove for Drivex School from round 5 onwards.

=== TCR Europe Touring Car Series ===
Year	Car	Drivers	Races	Wins	Poles	F/Laps	Podiums	Points	D.C.	T.C.
2022	Hyundai Elantra N TCR	(Spain) Alejandro Geppert	2	0	0	0	0	12	24th	15th

== Timeline ==
Former Series
Euroformula Open Championship	2001–2004, 2007–2019
Superleague Formula	2010–2011
International GT Open	2015–2020
World Series Formula V8 3.5	2016–2017
F4 Spanish Championship	2021–2022
TCR Europe Touring Car Series	2022

Achievements
Preceded by AF Corse	International GT Open Teams' Champion; 2016	Succeeded by Incumbent
