= 2001 Spanish Formula Three Championship =

Motor racing competition

Seasons
- ← none 2002 →

The 2001 Spanish Formula Three Championship was the first Spanish Formula Three season. It began on 27 May at Circuit Ricardo Tormo in Valencia and ended on 11 November at Circuit de Catalunya in Montmeló after fourteen races. Ander Vilariño was crowned series champion.

== Teams and drivers ==
- All teams were Spanish-registered. All cars were powered by Toyota engines, Dallara F300 chassis and Dunlop tyres.

Team	No.	Driver	Rounds
Racing Engineering	1	(Spain) Ander Vilariño	All
Racing Engineering	4	(France) Benjamin Poron	1–3
Racing Engineering	4	(Spain) Daniel Martín	4–7
E.V. Racing	2	(Spain) Daniel Martín	1–3
E.V. Racing	2	(Portugal) Álvaro Parente	4–7
E.V. Racing	5	(Portugal) Miguel Ramos	All
E.V. Racing	6	(Spain) Paul Robinson	All
Azteca Motorsport	3	(Sweden) Frederic Haglund	1–2
Azteca Motorsport	3	(Finland) Hannu Viinikainen	4–6
Azteca Motorsport	3	(Spain) Jordi Palomeras	7
Paco Ortí Racing	7	(Sweden) Peter Sundberg	1–4
Paco Ortí Racing	7	(Portugal) César Campaniço	5–6
Paco Ortí Racing	7	(Spain) Diego Puyo	7
Escuela Lois Circuit	8	(Spain) José Manuel Pérez-Aicart	All
Escuela Lois Circuit	9	(Spain) Félix Porteiro	All
G-Tec	10	(France) Philippe Bénoliel	1
G-Tec	10	(Spain) Jordi Palomeras	2
G-Tec	10	(Portugal) Álvaro Parente	3
G-Tec	10	(Spain) Ricardo Ferrando	6
G-Tec	10	(Spain) Pedro Salvador	7
G-Tec	11	(Finland) Henri Niskanen	7
Romero Racing	11	(Spain) Ángel Romero Redono	1, 4
Romero Racing	11	(Spain) Abel Fajas	3
ABV	11	(Spain) Ricardo Ferrando Vicente	5
Meycom	12	(Spain) Carlos Martín	1
Meycom	12	(Spain) Juan Antonio del Pino	2–7
Meycom	16	(Algeria) Nassim Sidi Said	1–2
Meycom	16	(Portugal) Ricardo Megre	3
Meycom	16	(Spain) Jordi Nogues	4–7
GTA Motor Competición	14	(Spain) Lucas Guerrero	All
GTA Motor Competición	17	(Spain) Marcel Costa	All
Skualo Competición	15	(Spain) María de Villota	1–2
Skualo Competición	15	(Spain) Emilio de Villota Jr.	3–6
Skualo Competición	15	(Spain) Sergei Yborra	7
Skualo Competición	18	(Spain) Sergei Yborra	1–4
Skualo Competición	18	(Spain) María de Villota	5–7

== Calendar ==
Round		Circuit	Date	Pole position	Fastest lap	Winning driver	Winning team
1	R1	(Spain) Circuit Ricardo Tormo, Valencia	27 May	(Spain) Ander Vilariño	(Spain) Daniel Martín	(Spain) Ander Vilariño	Racing Engineering
1	R2	(Spain) Circuit Ricardo Tormo, Valencia	27 May	(Spain) Félix Porteiro	(Spain) Ander Vilariño	(Spain) José Manuel Pérez-Aicart	Escuela Lois Circuit
2	R1	(Spain) Circuito del Jarama, Madrid	24 June	(Spain) Marcel Costa	(Sweden) Peter Sundberg	(Sweden) Peter Sundberg	Paco Ortí Racing
2	R2	(Spain) Circuito del Jarama, Madrid	24 June	(Sweden) Peter Sundberg	(Spain) Ander Vilariño	(Spain) Ander Vilariño	Racing Engineering
3	R1	(Portugal) Autódromo do Estoril, Estoril	8 July	(Spain) Ander Vilariño	(Spain) Ander Vilariño	(Spain) Ander Vilariño	Racing Engineering
3	R2	(Portugal) Autódromo do Estoril, Estoril	8 July	(Sweden) Peter Sundberg	(Spain) Ander Vilariño	(Spain) Félix Porteiro	Escuela Lois Circuit
4	R1	(Spain) Circuito de Albacete, Albacete	16 September	(Spain) Ander Vilariño	(Spain) Ander Vilariño	(Spain) Ander Vilariño	Racing Engineering
4	R2	(Spain) Circuito de Albacete, Albacete	16 September	(Spain) Félix Porteiro	(Spain) Ander Vilariño	(Spain) Ander Vilariño	Racing Engineering
5	R1	(Spain) Circuito del Jarama, Madrid	7 October	(Spain) Ander Vilariño	(Spain) Ander Vilariño	(Spain) Marcel Costa	GTA Motor Competición
5	R2	(Spain) Circuito del Jarama, Madrid	7 October	The race was cancelled due to heavy rain			
6	R1	(Spain) Circuit Ricardo Tormo, Valencia	14 October	(Spain) Ander Vilariño	(Spain) Daniel Martín	(Spain) José Manuel Pérez-Aicart	Escuela Lois Circuit
6	R2	(Spain) Circuit Ricardo Tormo, Valencia	14 October	(Spain) Ander Vilariño	(Spain) José Manuel Pérez-Aicart	(Spain) Ander Vilariño	Racing Engineering
7	R1	(Spain) Circuit de Catalunya, Barcelona	11 November	(Spain) Ander Vilariño	(Spain) Jordi Palomeras	(Spain) Jordi Palomeras	Azteca Motorsport
7	R2	(Spain) Circuit de Catalunya, Barcelona	11 November	(Spain) Daniel Martín	(Spain) Daniel Martín	(Spain) Daniel Martín	Racing Engineering

== Standings ==
=== Drivers' standings ===
- Points were awarded as follows:

Pos	1	2	3	4	5	6	7	8	9	10	11	12	13	14	15	PP	FL
Pts	20	18	16	14	12	10	9	8	7	6	5	4	3	2	1	**1**	2

Pos	Driver	VAL (Spain)		JAR (Spain)		EST (Portugal)		ALB (Spain)		JAR (Spain)		VAL (Spain)		CAT (Spain)		Pts
1	(Spain) Ander Vilariño	**1**	3	DSQ	1	**1**	7	**1**	1	**2**	C	**Ret**	**1**	**5**	Ret	196
2	(Spain) Daniel Martín	7	4	7	Ret	7	4	3	3	7	C	2	3	Ret	**1**	157
3	(Spain) José Manuel Pérez-Aicart	Ret	1	5	6	4	2	2	10	6	C	1	4	DNS	5	156
4	(Spain) Félix Porteiro	2	**DNS**	10	3	2	1	5	**2**	4	C	Ret	15	Ret	10	131
5	(Spain) Paul Robinson	5	6	3	4	13	3	Ret	11	5	C	7	6	9	7	123
6	(Sweden) Peter Sundberg	3	2	1	**2**	3	**Ret**	4	4							120
7	(Spain) Marcel Costa	6	8	**2**	10	Ret	13	8	8	1	C	5	7	6	Ret	113
8	(Spain) Lucas Guerrero	Ret	7	4	7	5	6	9	Ret	9	C	8	8	Ret	9	91
9	(Spain) Jordi Nogues							7	5	Ret	C	3	2	3	2	89
10	(Portugal) Miguel Ramos	10	9	9	8	8	8	10	9	10	C	10	12	10	Ret	79
11	(Spain) Juan Antonio del Pino			Ret	13	Ret	Ret	11	7	11	C	4	9	4	3	73
12	(Portugal) Álvaro Parente					9	9	12	Ret	12	C	9	13	8	6	50
13	(Finland) Hannu Viinikainen							6	6	3	C	Ret	5			48
14	(Sweden) Frederic Haglund	4	5	8	5											46
15	(Spain) Jordi Palomeras			6	9									1	13	42
16	(Spain) Sergei Yborra	11	13	11	Ret	10	10	Ret	13					Ret	8	36
17	(Spain) Pedro Salvador													2	4	32
18	(France) Benjamin Poron	8	10	Ret	12	11	11									28
19	(Portugal) Ricardo Megre					6	5									22
20	(Spain) María de Villota	12	12	Ret	11					DNS	C	12	14	Ret	Ret	19
21	(Portugal) César Campaniço									8	C	6	Ret			18
22	(Spain) Emilio de Villota Jr.					DSQ	Ret	13	14	14	C	11	10			18
23	(Finland) Henri Niskanen													7	12	13
24	(Algeria) Nassim Sidi Said	9	11	DSQ	Ret											12
25	(Spain) Diego Puyo													11	11	10
26	(Spain) Abel Fajas					12	12									8
27	(Spain) Ricardo Ferrando									13	C	Ret	11			8
28	(Spain) Ángel Romero Redono	15	14					Ret	12							7
29	(France) Philippe Bénoliel	13	Ret													3
30	(Spain) Carlos Martín	14	15													3
Pos	Driver	VAL (Spain)		JAR (Spain)		EST (Portugal)		ALB (Spain)		JAR (Spain)		VAL (Spain)		CAT (Spain)		Pts

Colour	Result
Gold	Winner
Silver	Second place
Bronze	Third place
Green	Points classification
Blue	Non-points classification
Blue	Non-classified finish (NC)
Purple	Retired, not classified (Ret)
Red	Did not qualify (DNQ)
Red	Did not pre-qualify (DNPQ)
Black	Disqualified (DSQ)
White	Did not start (DNS)
White	Withdrew (WD)
White	Race cancelled (C)
Blank	Did not practice (DNP)
Blank	Did not arrive (DNA)
Blank	Excluded (EX)

**Bold** – Pole
Italics – Fastest Lap

=== Teams' standings ===
- Points were awarded as follows:

Pos	1	2	3	4	5
Points	10	8	6	4	3

Pos	Team	Car No.	VAL (Spain)		JAR (Spain)		EST (Portugal)		ALB (Spain)		JAR (Spain)		VAL (Spain)		CAT (Spain)		Pts
1	Racing Engineering	1	1	3	DSQ	1	1	7	1	1	2	C	Ret	1	5	Ret	113
1	Racing Engineering	4	8	10	Ret	12	11	11	3	3	7	C	2	3	Ret	1	113
2	Escuela Lois Circuit	8	Ret	1	5	6	4	2	2	10	6	C	1	4	DNS	5	94
2	Escuela Lois Circuit	9	2	DNS	10	3	2	1	5	2	4	C	Ret	15	Ret	10	94
3	Meycom Sport	12	14	15	Ret	13	Ret	Ret	11	7	11	C	4	9	4	3	48
3	Meycom Sport	16	9	11	DSQ	Ret	6	5	7	5	Ret	C	3	2	3	2	48
4	Paco Ortí Racing - Elide	7	3	2	1	2	3	Ret	4	4	8	C	6	Ret	11	11	46
5	E.V. Racing	2	7	4	7	Ret	7	4	12	Ret	12	C	9	13	8	6	30
5	E.V. Racing	5	10	9	9	8	8	8	10	9	10	C	10	12	10	Ret	30
5	E.V. Racing	6	5	6	3	4	13	3	Ret	11	5	C	7	6	9	7	30
6	Azteca Motorsport	3	4	5	8	5			6	6	3	C	Ret	5	1	13	29
7	GTA Motor Competición	14	Ret	7	4	7	5	6	9	Ret	9	C	8	8	Ret	9	28
7	GTA Motor Competición	17	6	8	2	10	Ret	13	8	8	1	C	5	7	6	Ret	28
8	G-Tec	10	13	Ret	6	9	9	9					Ret	11	2	4	12
8	G-Tec	11	15	14			12	12	Ret	12	13	C			7	12	12
9	Skualo Competición	15	12	12	Ret	11	DSQ	Ret	13	14	14	C	11	10	Ret	8	0
9	Skualo Competición	18	11	13	11	Ret	10	10	Ret	13	DNS	C	12	14	Ret	Ret	0
Pos	Team	Car No.	VAL (Spain)		JAR (Spain)		EST (Portugal)		ALB (Spain)		JAR (Spain)		VAL (Spain)		CAT (Spain)		Pts
