= De Villota =

De Villota is a surname. Notable people with the surname include:

- Emilio de Villota (born 1946), Spanish racing driver
- Emilio de Villota Jr. (born 1981), Spanish racing driver
- María de Villota (1980−2013), Spanish racing driver

== See also ==
- Villota (disambiguation)
