= Villota =

Villota may refer to:

- Francisco Villota (1873–1949), Spanish pelota player
- María de Villota (1980–2013), Spanish racing driver

== See also ==
- de Villota
