= Álvaro Parente =

Portuguese racing driver

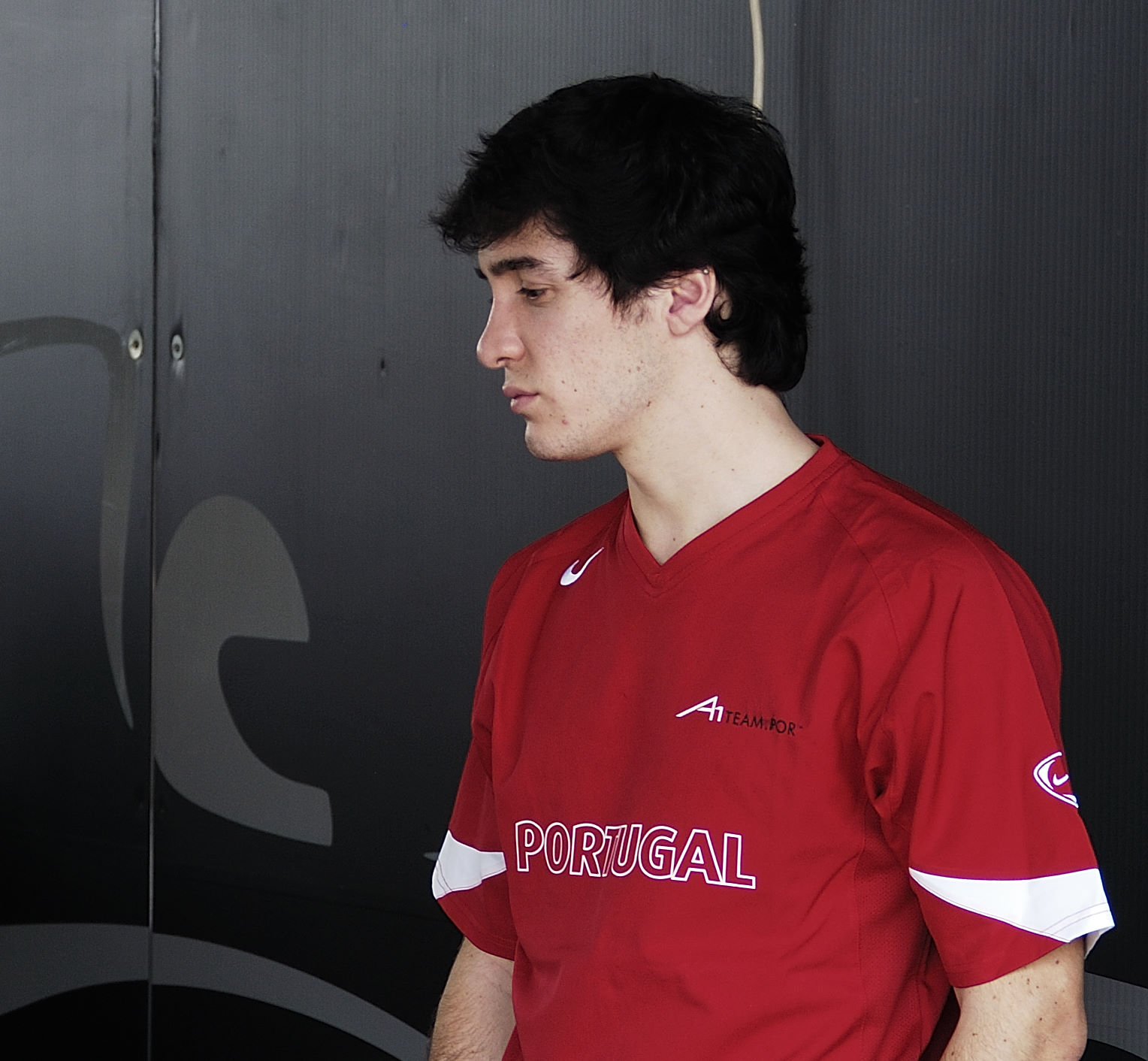
- Parente in 2007
- Nationality: (Portugal) Portuguese
- Born: Álvaro Maia Parente; 4 October 1984 (age 42) Porto, Portugal

Pirelli World Challenge career
- Debut season: 2016
- Current team: K-Pax Racing
- Categorisation: FIA Platinum
- Car number: 9
- Starts: 14
- Wins: 5
- Poles: 2
- Fastest laps: 5

Previous series
- 2008–2011 2008–09, 2009–10 2006–07 2004–05 2003 2001–02: GP2 Series; GP2 Asia Series; Formula Renault 3.5 Series; British Formula 3 Formula 3 Euro Series; Spanish Formula Three

Championship titles
- 2005 2007: British Formula 3 Formula Renault 3.5 Series

Álvaro Maia Parente (born 4 October 1984) is a Portuguese professional racing driver.

== Career ==
=== Early career ===
After winning the Karting European Junior Championship in 1998, Porto-born Parente made his debut in auto racing in 2001 at the age of 16, driving in the Spanish F3 Championship. In the following year, he was integrated into the Team Portugal project and scored a win on his way to fourth place in the series.

=== Formula Three ===
Parente than began a more international career in 2003, moving to the F3 Euroseries with Team Ghinzani, but the Mugen-Honda engine proved to be inferior to the Mercedes and he scored a single point. He did better with one-off entries in Italian Formula 3 and at Spa in a round of the British Formula 3 Championship, his first association with Carlin Motorsport, which was repeated that year in the Macau Grand Prix.

This brief contact paved the way for a contract with Carlin for the 2004 season, where Parente took part in the British series, scoring another win and finishing seventh in the championship standings. He also took part in the Marlboro Masters and at Macau, but in the former the Mugen-Honda could not take the fight to the Mercedes drivers and in the latter he was taken out in the first lap.

Parente stayed in the British Formula 3 for another season, and his experience helped him to win the championship with four races to go, scoring a total of 11 wins. This result made him the natural candidate to represent A1 Team Portugal for the new A1 Grand Prix series.

=== Formula Renault 3.5 Series ===
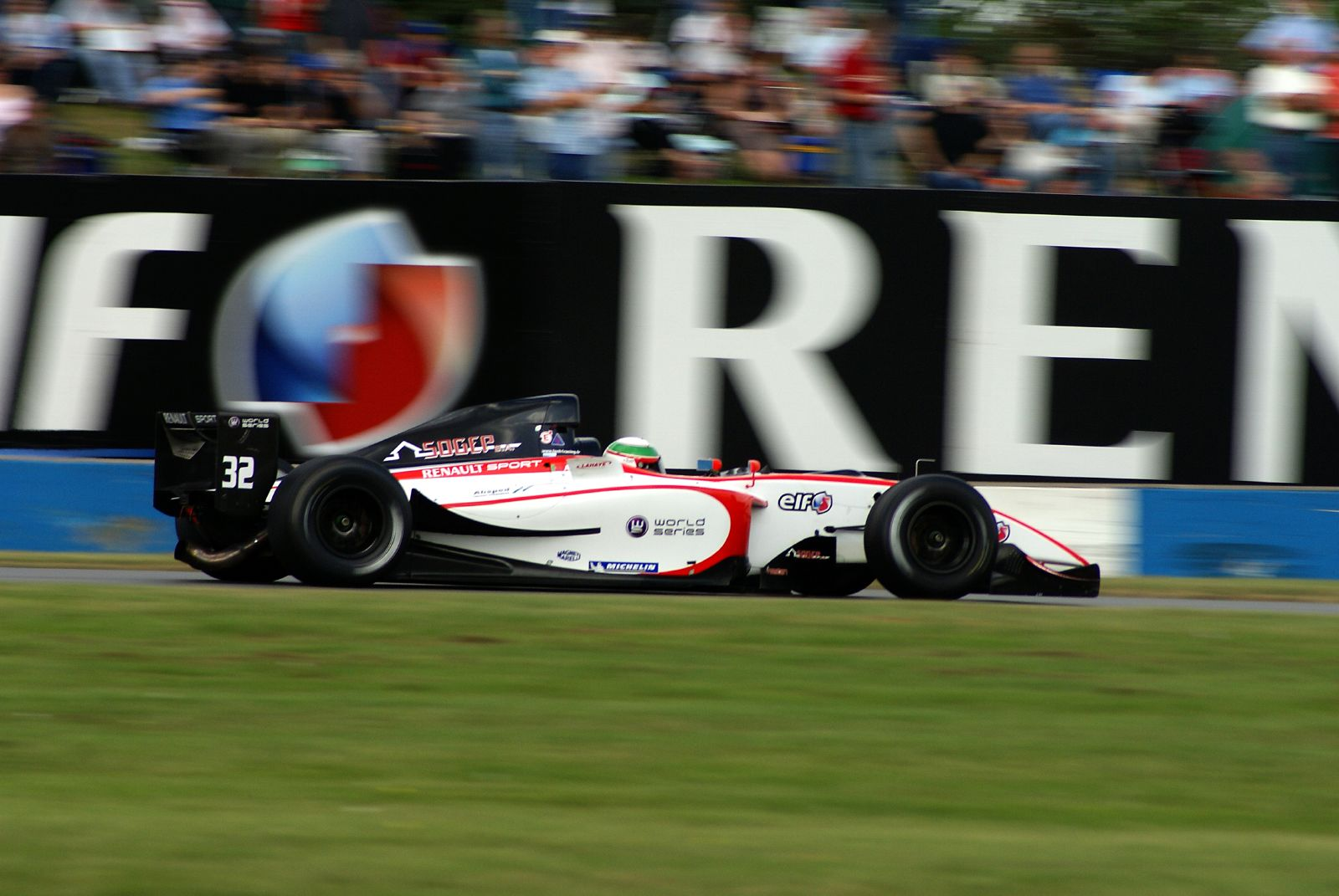
Parente won the 2007 Formula Renault 3.5 Series championship with the Tech 1 Racing team.

For 2006, Parente joined the Formula Renault 3.5 Series with the Victory Engineering team, and achieved his first win at Istanbul in only his fifth race in the category. He took two further wins at the Nürburgring and Circuit de Catalunya to finish fifth in the final standings. He had hoped to progress onto the GP2 Series in 2007, but a lack of sponsorship scuppered his plans. He did, however, return to the Formula Renault 3.5 Series with the French Tech 1 Racing team, having signed a contract on the eve of the first pre-season test.

During the 2007 season, Parente took five podium finishes, including two race victories at Monaco and Spa, and was crowned World Series by Renault champion at the final round in Barcelona on 27 October.

As a prize for winning the Formula Renault 3.5 Series, Parente has tested for the Renault F1 team on 17 January 2008 at the Circuito de Jerez.

=== GP2 Series ===
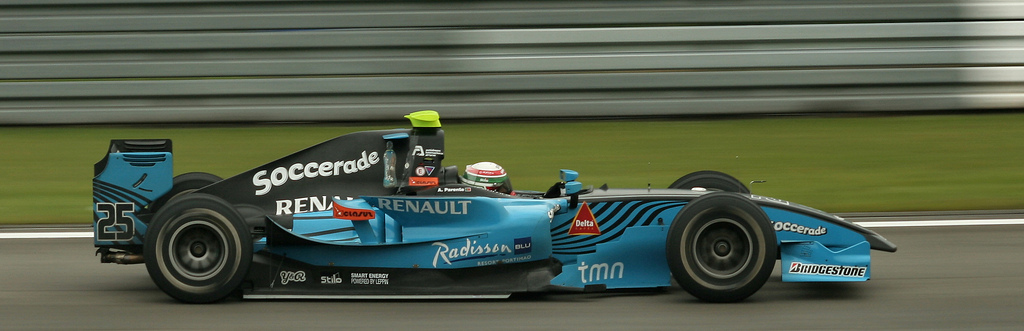
Parente driving for Ocean Racing Technology at the Nürburgring round of the 2009 GP2 Series season.

For 2008, Parente moved to the Super Nova Racing team in the GP2 Series, widely regarded as the primary feeder series to Formula One.

Parente made a stunning start to his GP2 career in the opening round of the season at the Circuit de Catalunya, Parente won the feature race making him the first Portuguese driver to win in GP2 Series. Alvaro Parente led from start to finish, to claim victory ahead of Bruno Senna and Andreas Zuber. He eventually finished eighth in the drivers' championship.

Super Nova team nicknamed Parente as "Chachi", due to his likeness to the famous character in Happy Days.

In 2009, Parente participated in the GP2 Asia Series with My Team Qi.Meritus, and competed in the GP2 Series with Ocean Racing Technology, finishing eighth once again.

Parente began the 2010 season without a drive, but replaced Alberto Valerio at the Coloni team from the Belgian round onwards. On his return to the category, he scored a double podium finish, and ended the weekend as the highest scoring driver. He was replaced for the final round by James Jakes.

Parente again went into the 2011 GP2 Series season without a drive, but was called up by Racing Engineering for the second round of the championship at Catalunya. He replaced Christian Vietoris, who had complained of recurring headaches following a heavy crash at the first round in Turkey. Vietoris returned after two rounds, but Parente remained in the series by switching to the Carlin team, where he took the seat previously occupied by Oliver Turvey. After a further six races, he relinquished the seat to Mikhail Aleshin. He then returned for the season finale at Monza, ending up in 16th place in the drivers' championship.

=== Superleague Formula ===
Parente agreed to race at the 2009 Estoril round of the 2009 Superleague Formula season for his football squad team, F.C. Porto, and went on to win the second race, on his series debut.

=== Formula One ===
Parente was a leading contender for a seat at Campos Meta, other contenders were Vitaly Petrov and Pastor Maldonado. On 15 December 2009, it was officially announced that Parente would join the new Virgin Racing team as a test driver. However, he was not present at the launch of the VR-01 chassis in February 2010, and it was reported that he had left the team due to sponsorship problems. Andy Soucek replaced Parente as the reserve driver.

=== GT ===
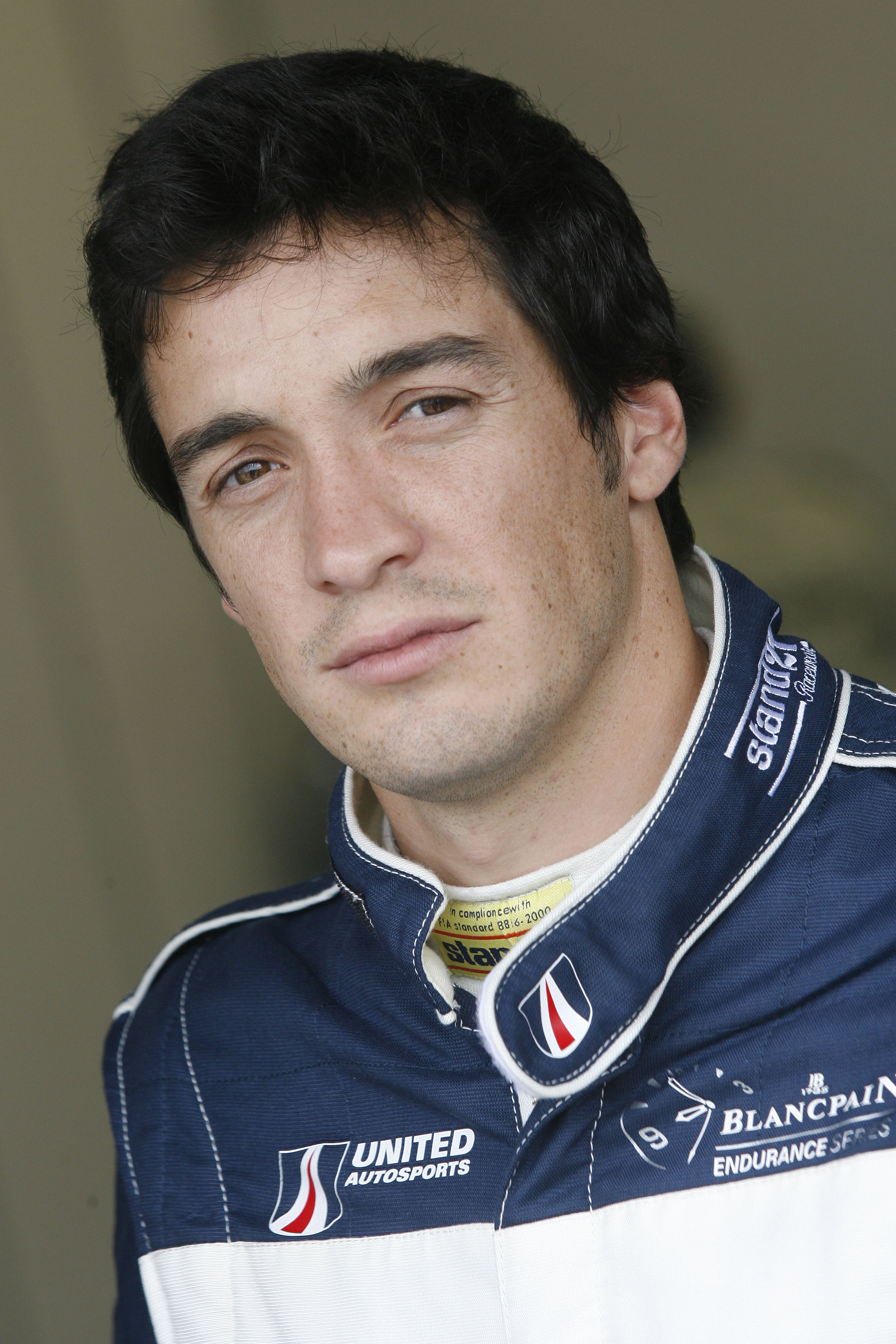
Parente in 2012

Since 2012, Parente has regularly been a factory GT3 driver for McLaren customer teams. His highlight was winning the 2016 Liqui Moly Bathurst 12 Hour for Tekno Autosports alongside Shane van Gisbergen and Jonathon Webb as well as taking the 2016 Pirelli World Challenge Championship title. He has also competed in the 24 Hours of Le Mans in 2012 for Ram Racing in a Ferrari 458 Italia GT2.

== Racing record ==
=== Career summary ===
| Season | Series | Team | Races | Wins | Poles | F/Laps | Podiums | Points | Position |
|---|---|---|---|---|---|---|---|---|---|
| 2001 | Spanish Formula 3 Championship | G-Tec | 2 | 0 | 0 | 0 | 0 | 50 | 12th |
| 2001 | Spanish Formula 3 Championship | E. V. Racing | 7 | 0 | 0 | 0 | 0 | 50 | 12th |
| 2002 | Spanish Formula 3 Championship | Racing Engineering | 13 | 1 | 1 | 1 | 1 | 133 | 5th |
| 2003 | Formula 3 Euro Series | Team Ghinzani | 19 | 0 | 0 | 0 | 0 | 1 | 25th |
| 2003 | Italian Formula 3 Championship | Team Ghinzani | 2 | 1 | 1 | 1 | 2 | 34 | 9th |
| 2003 | Masters of Formula 3 | Team Ghinzani | 1 | 0 | 0 | 0 | 0 | N/A | 22nd |
| 2003 | British Formula 3 International Series | Carlin Motorsport | 2 | 0 | 0 | 0 | 0 | 7 | 22nd |
| 2003 | Macau Grand Prix | Carlin Motorsport | 1 | 0 | 0 | 0 | 0 | N/A | DNF |
| 2003 | F3 Korea Super Prix | Carlin Motorsport | 1 | 0 | 0 | 0 | 0 | N/A | 10th |
| 2004 | British Formula 3 International Series | Carlin Motorsport | 23 | 1 | 2 | 0 | 4 | 137 | 7th |
| 2004 | Masters of Formula 3 | Carlin Motorsport | 1 | 0 | 0 | 0 | 0 | N/A | DNF |
| 2004 | F3 European Cup | Carlin Motorsport | 1 | 0 | 0 | 0 | 0 | N/A | 8th |
| 2004 | Macau Grand Prix | Carlin Motorsport | 2 | 0 | 0 | 0 | 0 | N/A | DNF |
| 2005 | British Formula 3 International Series | Carlin Motorsport | 16 | 11 | 9 | 7 | 13 | 289 | **1st** |
| 2005 | Masters of Formula 3 | Carlin Motorsport | 1 | 0 | 0 | 0 | 0 | N/A | DNF |
| 2005–06 | A1 Grand Prix | A1 Team Portugal | 20 | 0 | 0 | 0 | 3 | 66‡ | 9th‡ |
| 2006 | Formula Renault 3.5 Series | Victory Engineering | 15 | 3 | 0 | 0 | 5 | 94 | 5th |
| 2006–07 | A1 Grand Prix | A1 Team Portugal | 6 | 0 | 0 | 0 | 0 | 10‡ | 17th‡ |
| 2007 | Formula Renault 3.5 Series | Tech 1 Racing | 17 | 2 | 2 | 1 | 5 | 129 | **1st** |
| 2008 | GP2 Series | Super Nova Racing | 20 | 1 | 0 | 0 | 4 | 34 | 8th |
| 2008 | Formula One | ING Renault F1 Team | Test driver | | | | | | |
| 2008–09 | GP2 Asia Series | My Team Qi-Meritus Mahara | 6 | 0 | 0 | 2 | 0 | 1 | 21st |
| 2009 | GP2 Series | Ocean Racing Technology | 20 | 1 | 1 | 1 | 2 | 30 | 8th |
| 2009 | Spanish GT Championship - GTA | Aurora Racing Team | 2 | 0 | 1 | 1 | 0 | 10 | 25th |
| 2009 | Spanish GT Championship - Super GT | Aurora Racing Team | 2 | 0 | 1 | 0 | 0 | 4 | 8th |
| 2009 | Superleague Formula | F.C. Porto | 2 | 1 | 0 | 0 | 1 | 302‡ | 5th‡ |
| 2009–10 | GP2 Asia Series | Scuderia Coloni | 4 | 0 | 0 | 0 | 1 | 12 | 8th |
| 2010 | GP2 Series | Scuderia Coloni | 4 | 0 | 0 | 0 | 2 | 13 | 15th |
| 2010 | Superleague Formula | F.C. Porto | 20 | 2 | 0 | 2 | 3 | 495‡ | 7th‡ |
| 2010 | Le Mans Series - GT2 | AF Corse | 1 | 0 | 0 | 0 | 0 | 9 | 21st |
| 2010 | International GT Open | Aurora Racing Team | 2 | 1 | 1 | 0 | 1 | 0 | NC† |
| 2010 | Spanish GT Championship - Super GT | Aurora Racing Team | 10 | 2 | 2 | 3 | 10 | 78 | **3rd** |
| 2011 | GP2 Series | Racing Engineering | 4 | 0 | 0 | 0 | 1 | 8 | 16th |
| 2011 | GP2 Series | Carlin | 8 | 0 | 0 | 0 | 0 | 8 | 16th |
| 2012 | FIA GT1 World Championship | Hexis Racing | 18 | 0 | 1 | 1 | 4 | 65 | 11th |
| 2012 | Blancpain Endurance Series - Pro | United Autosports | 4 | 1 | 0 | 0 | 1 | 31 | 13th |
| 2012 | British GT Championship - GT3 | United Autosports | 1 | 1 | 0 | 1 | 1 | 0 | NC† |
| 2012 | Blancpain Endurance Series - Pro-Am | Von Ryan Racing | 1 | 0 | 1 | 0 | 0 | 17 | 22nd |
| 2013 | FIA GT Series | Sébastien Loeb Racing | 12 | 4 | 1 | 3 | 5 | 82 | 4th |
| 2013 | Blancpain Endurance Series - Pro | Hexis Racing | 5 | 0 | 0 | 0 | 1 | 24 | 10th |
| 2013 | British GT Championship - GT3 | United Autosports | 5 | 0 | 0 | 0 | 0 | 1 | 35th |
| 2013 | International GT Open - GTS | Bhai Tech Racing | 2 | 0 | 0 | 0 | 1 | 0 | NC† |
| 2014 | FIA World Endurance Championship - GTE Pro | Ram Racing | 2 | 0 | 0 | 0 | 0 | 8 | 27th |
| 2014 | 24 Hours of Le Mans - GTE Pro | Ram Racing | 1 | 0 | 0 | 0 | 0 | N/A | DNF |
| 2014 | ADAC GT Masters | MRS-GT Racing | 2 | 0 | 0 | 0 | 0 | 0 | NC |
| 2014 | Blancpain Endurance Series - Pro | ART Grand Prix | 5 | 1 | 2 | 1 | 2 | 49 | 7th |
| 2014 | Blancpain GT Sprint Series | Bhaitech | 2 | 0 | 0 | 0 | 0 | 0 | NC |
| 2014 | Stock Car Brasil | Voxx Racing | 1 | 0 | 0 | 0 | 0 | 0 | NC† |
| 2014 | 24 Hours of Nürburgring - SP9 | Dörr Motorsport | 1 | 0 | 0 | 0 | 0 | N/A | DNF |
| 2015 | Blancpain Endurance Series - Pro | Von Ryan Racing | 5 | 0 | 0 | 0 | 0 | 10 | 20th |
| 2015 | International GT Open - Pro-Am | Teo Martín Motorsport | 14 | 3 | 6 | 6 | 11 | 94 | **1st** |
| 2015 | GT Asia Series | FFF Racing Team | 4 | 0 | 0 | 0 | 1 | 41 | 23rd |
| 2015 | FIA GT World Cup | FFF Racing Team | 2 | 0 | 0 | 0 | 0 | N/A | 7th |
| 2015 | Stock Car Brasil | Voxx Racing | 1 | 0 | 0 | 0 | 0 | 0 | NC† |
| 2016 | Blancpain GT Series Sprint Cup | Garage 59 | 10 | 1 | 1 | 1 | 2 | 56 | 6th |
| 2016 | International GT Open - Pro-Am | Garage 59 | 2 | 0 | 0 | 0 | 1 | 9 | 19th |
| 2016 | Pirelli World Challenge - GT | K-Pax Racing | 20 | 7 | 5 | 4 | 9 | 1657 | **1st** |
| 2016 | Intercontinental GT Challenge | Tekno Autosports | 1 | 1 | 1 | 1 | 1 | 40 | 4th |
| 2016 | Intercontinental GT Challenge | K-Pax Racing | 1 | 0 | 1 | 0 | 1 | 40 | 4th |
| 2017 | FIA World Endurance Championship - GTE Am | Clearwater Racing | 1 | 0 | 0 | 0 | 0 | 16 | 10th |
| 2017 | 24 Hours of Le Mans - GTE Am | Clearwater Racing | 1 | 0 | 0 | 0 | 0 | N/A | 6th |
| 2017 | Blancpain GT Series Endurance Cup | Strakka Racing | 1 | 0 | 0 | 0 | 0 | 4 | 41st |
| 2017 | Blancpain GT Series Sprint Cup | Strakka Racing | 8 | 0 | 0 | 1 | 0 | 2 | 30th |
| 2017 | Australian Endurance Championship | Tekno Autosports | 2 | 0 | 0 | 0 | 0 | 135 | 25th |
| 2017 | Pirelli World Challenge - GT | K-Pax Racing | 21 | 4 | 3 | 2 | 8 | 315 | **3rd** |
| 2017 | Intercontinental GT Challenge | Tekno Autosports/McLaren GT | 1 | 0 | 0 | 0 | 0 | 27 | 5th |
| 2017 | Intercontinental GT Challenge | K-Pax Racing | 1 | 0 | 0 | 0 | 1 | 27 | 5th |
| 2018 | Blancpain GT Series Endurance Cup | Strakka Racing | 4 | 0 | 0 | 0 | 1 | 20 | 23rd |
| 2018 | Pirelli World Challenge - GT | K-Pax Racing | 17 | 2 | 4 | 5 | 6 | 246 | 5th |
| 2018 | IMSA SportsCar Championship - GTD | Meyer Shank Racing with Curb-Agajanian | 9 | 1 | 1 | 0 | 5 | 264 | 6th |
| 2018 | Intercontinental GT Challenge | Strakka Racing | 3 | 0 | 0 | 0 | 1 | 28 | 11th |
| 2018 | Intercontinental GT Challenge | K-Pax Racing | 1 | 0 | 0 | 0 | 0 | 28 | 11th |
| 2019 | Blancpain GT World Challenge America | K-Pax Racing | 14 | 4 | 7 | 4 | 12 | 237 | **2nd** |
| 2020 | GT World Challenge Europe Endurance Cup | Bentley K-PAX Racing | 4 | 0 | 0 | 0 | 0 | 0 | NC |
| 2020 | Intercontinental GT Challenge | Bentley K-PAX Racing | 1 | 0 | 0 | 0 | 0 | 1 | 21st |
| 2020 | IMSA SportsCar Championship - GTD | Heinricher Racing with MSR Curb-Agajanian | 9 | 0 | 0 | 1 | 1 | 225 | 12th |
| 2021 | 24 Hours of Le Mans - GTE Pro | HubAuto Racing | 1 | 0 | 1 | 0 | 0 | N/A | DNF |
| 2023 | GT World Challenge Asia - GT3 | HubAuto Racing | 12 | 0 | 1 | 0 | 0 | 14 | 31st |
| 2023 | Indian Racing League | Hyderabad Blackbirds | 0 | 0 | 0 | 0 | 0 | 56‡ | 6th‡ |
| 2024 | 24H Series - GT3 | E2P Racing | 7 | 0 | 0 | 0 | 0 | 104 | **3rd** |
| 2024 | Indian Racing League | Speed Demons Delhi | 4 | 1 | 1 | 1 | 4 | 82‡ | 6th‡ |
| 2026 | GT3 Revival Series - Pro-Am | Leopard Racing Team Quinntech | | | | | | | |

† Guest driver ineligible to score points

‡ Team standings.

=== Complete Spanish Formula Three Championship results ===
(key) (Races in bold indicate pole position) (Races in italics indicate fastest lap)

| Year | Entrant | 1 | 2 | 3 | 4 | 5 | 6 | 7 | 8 | 9 | 10 | 11 | 12 | 13 | 14 | DC | Points |
|---|---|---|---|---|---|---|---|---|---|---|---|---|---|---|---|---|---|
| 2001 | G-Tec | VAL; 1 | VAL; 2 | JAR; 1 | JAR; 2 | EST; 1; 9 | EST; 2; 9 | | | | | | | | | 12th | 50 |
| 2001 | E.V. Racing | | | | | | | ALB; 1; 12 | ALB; 2 Ret | JAR; 1; 12 | JAR; 2 C | VAL; 1; 9 | VAL; 2; 13 | CAT; 1; 8 | CAT; 2; 6 | 12th | 50 |
| 2002 | Racing Engineering | ALB; 1; 6 | **ALB**; **2**; 1 | JER; 1; 5 | JER; 2; 5 | EST; 1; 5 | EST; 2; 10 | VAL; 10 | JER; 1 Ret | JER; 2; 4 | JAR; 1; 8 | JAR; 2; 4 | CAT; 1; 8 | CAT; 2; 4 | | 5th | 133 |

=== Complete Formula 3 Euro Series results ===
(key) (Races in bold indicate pole position) (Races in italics indicate fastest lap)

| Year | Entrant | Chassis | Engine | 1 | 2 | 3 | 4 | 5 | 6 | 7 | 8 | 9 | 10 | 11 | 12 | 13 | 14 | 15 | 16 | 17 | 18 | 19 | 20 | DC | Points |
|---|---|---|---|---|---|---|---|---|---|---|---|---|---|---|---|---|---|---|---|---|---|---|---|---|---|
| 2003 | Team Ghinzani | Dallara F302 | Mugen-Honda | HOC; 1; 9 | HOC; 2; 13 | ADR; 1; 11 | ADR; 2; 14 | PAU; 1; 11 | PAU; 2 Ret | NOR; 1 Ret | NOR; 2 Ret | LMS; 1; 16 | LMS; 2; 10 | NÜR; 1 DSQ | NÜR; 2 EX | A1R; 1; 29† | A1R; 2 DSQ | ZAN; 1; 8 | ZAN; 2; 11 | HOC; 1; 18 | HOC; 2; 15 | MAG; 1; 12 | MAG; 2; 12 | 25th | 1 |

† Driver did not finish the race, but was classified as he completed over 90% of the race distance.

=== Complete Italian Formula Three Championship results ===
(key) (Races in bold indicate pole position) (Races in italics indicate fastest lap)

| Year | Entrant | Chassis | Engine | 1 | 2 | 3 | 4 | 5 | 6 | 7 | 8 | 9 | DC | Points |
|---|---|---|---|---|---|---|---|---|---|---|---|---|---|---|
| 2003 | Team Ghinzani | Dallara F302 | Mugen-Honda | **MIS**; 1 | BIN | MAG | IMO | PER | MUG | VAR | MNZ | VLL; 3 | 9th | 34 |

=== Complete British Formula Three Championship results ===
(key) (Races in bold indicate pole position) (Races in italics indicate fastest lap)

| Year | Entrant | Chassis | Engine | Class | 1 | 2 | 3 | 4 | 5 | 6 | 7 | 8 | 9 | 10 | 11 | 12 | 13 | 14 | 15 | 16 | 17 | 18 | 19 | 20 | 21 | 22 | 23 | 24 | DC | Points | |
|---|---|---|---|---|---|---|---|---|---|---|---|---|---|---|---|---|---|---|---|---|---|---|---|---|---|---|---|---|---|---|---|
| 2003 | Carlin Motorsport | Dallara F303 | Mugen-Honda | C | DON; 1 | DON; 2 | SNE; 1 | SNE; 2 | CRO; 1 | CRO; 2 | KNO; 1 | KNO; 2 | SIL; 1 | SIL; 2 | CAS; 1 | CAS; 2 | OUL; 1 | OUL; 2 | ROC; 1 | ROC; 2 | THR; 1 | THR; 2 | SPA; 1; 7 | SPA; 2; 8 | DON; 1 | DON; 2 | BRH; 1 | BRH; 2 | | 22nd | 5 |
| 2004 | Carlin Motorsport | Dallara F304 | Mugen-Honda | C | DON; 1; 8 | **DON**; **2**; 10 | SIL; 1; 8 | SIL; 2 C | CRO; 1 Ret | CRO; 2; 10 | KNO; 1; 8 | KNO; 2; 8 | SNE; 1; 6 | SNE; 2 Ret | SNE; 3; 8 | CAS; 1; 5 | CAS; 2; 1 | DON; 1; 7 | **DON**; **2**; 2 | OUL; 1; 3 | OUL; 2; 4 | SIL; 1; 9 | SIL; 2; 2 | THR; 1; 7 | THR; 2; 5 | SPA; 1; 10 | SPA; 2; 8 | BRH; 1; 8 | BRH; 2; 5 | 7th | 137 |
| 2005 | Carlin Motorsport | Dallara F305 | Mugen-Honda | DON; 1 | DON; 2 | **SPA**; **1** C | SPA; 2 C | **CRO**; **1**; 3 | **CRO**; **2**; 1 | **KNO**; **1**; 1 | **KNO**; **2**; 1 | THR; 1; 5 | THR; 2; 13 | CAS; 1; 2 | **CAS**; **2**; 1 | MNZ; 1; 1 | **MNZ**; **2**; 1 | **MNZ**; **3**; 1 | SIL; 1; 2 | **SIL**; **2**; 1 | SIL; 3; 1 | **NÜR**; **1**; 3 | NÜR; 2; 1 | MON; 1; 1 | MON; 2 Ret | SIL; 1 | SIL; 2 | | 1st | 289 | |

=== Complete A1 Grand Prix results ===
(key) (Races in bold indicate pole position) (Races in italics indicate fastest lap)

| Year | Entrant | 1 | 2 | 3 | 4 | 5 | 6 | 7 | 8 | 9 | 10 | 11 | 12 | 13 | 14 | 15 | 16 | 17 | 18 | 19 | 20 | 21 | 22 | DC | Points |
|---|---|---|---|---|---|---|---|---|---|---|---|---|---|---|---|---|---|---|---|---|---|---|---|---|---|
| 2005–06 | Portugal | GBR; SPR; 8 | GBR; FEA; Ret | GER; SPR; Ret | GER; FEA; 11 | POR; SPR; 6 | POR; FEA; 5 | AUS; SPR; 2 | AUS; FEA; 7 | MYS; SPR; 9 | MYS; FEA; 18 | UAE; SPR; 8 | UAE; FEA; 4 | RSA; SPR; 8 | RSA; FEA; 3 | IDN; SPR; 19 | IDN; FEA; Ret | MEX; SPR; Ret | MEX; FEA; 10 | USA; SPR; 3 | USA; FEA; 4 | CHN; SPR | CHN; FEA | 9th | 66 |
| 2006–07 | Portugal | NED; SPR | NED; FEA | CZE; SPR | CZE; FEA | BEI; SPR | BEI; FEA | MYS; SPR | MYS; FEA | IDN; SPR | IDN; FEA | NZL; SPR | NZL; FEA | AUS; SPR | AUS; FEA | RSA; SPR; 8 | RSA; FEA; 5 | MEX; SPR; 14 | MEX; FEA; 7 | SHA; SPR | SHA; FEA | GBR; SPR; 11 | GBR; SPR; 11 | 17th | 10 |

=== Complete Formula Renault 3.5 Series results ===
(key) (Races in bold indicate pole position) (Races in italics indicate fastest lap)

| Year | Entrant | 1 | 2 | 3 | 4 | 5 | 6 | 7 | 8 | 9 | 10 | 11 | 12 | 13 | 14 | 15 | 16 | 17 | DC | Points |
|---|---|---|---|---|---|---|---|---|---|---|---|---|---|---|---|---|---|---|---|---|
| 2006 | Victory Engineering | ZOL; 1 DNS | ZOL; 2 DNQ | MON; 1; 6 | IST; 1; 3 | IST; 2; 1 | MIS; 1; 3 | MIS; 2; 4 | SPA; 1 Ret | SPA; 2; 4 | NÜR; 1; 1 | NÜR; 2 Ret | DON; 1; 17 | DON; 2 Ret | LMS; 1; 12 | LMS; 2; 11 | CAT; 1; 3 | CAT; 2; 1 | 5th | 94 |
| 2007 | Tech 1 Racing | MNZ; 1; 2 | MNZ; 2; 4 | NÜR; 1; 3 | NÜR; 2; 10 | **MON**; **1**; 1 | HUN; 1 Ret | HUN; 2 Ret | SPA; 1; 1 | SPA; 2; 6 | **DON**; **1**; 4 | DON; 2 Ret | MAG; 1; 6 | MAG; 2; 4 | EST; 1; 6 | EST; 2; 7 | CAT; 1; 3 | CAT; 2; 6 | **1st** | **129** |

=== Complete GP2 Series results ===
(key) (Races in bold indicate pole position) (Races in italics indicate fastest lap)

| Year | Entrant | 1 | 2 | 3 | 4 | 5 | 6 | 7 | 8 | 9 | 10 | 11 | 12 | 13 | 14 | 15 | 16 | 17 | 18 | 19 | 20 | DC | Points |
|---|---|---|---|---|---|---|---|---|---|---|---|---|---|---|---|---|---|---|---|---|---|---|---|
| 2008 | Super Nova Racing | CAT; FEA; 1 | CAT; SPR; 7 | IST; FEA; Ret | IST; SPR; 8 | MON; FEA; 5 | MON; SPR; 3 | MAG; FEA; 9 | MAG; SPR; Ret | SIL; FEA; 16 | SIL; SPR; Ret | HOC; FEA; 3 | HOC; SPR; 6 | HUN; FEA; 16 | HUN; SPR; Ret | VAL; FEA; 16† | VAL; SPR; Ret | SPA; FEA; 2 | SPA; SPR; Ret | MNZ; FEA; Ret | MNZ; SPR; 12 | 8th | 34 |
| 2009 | Ocean Racing Technology | CAT; FEA; Ret | CAT; SPR; 11 | MON; FEA; Ret | MON; SPR; Ret | IST; FEA; Ret | IST; SPR; 10 | SIL; FEA; Ret | SIL; SPR; 11 | NÜR; FEA; 6 | NÜR; SPR; 2 | HUN; FEA; 9 | HUN; SPR; 6 | VAL; FEA; 4 | VAL; SPR; Ret | **SPA**; **FEA**; 1 | SPA; SPR; Ret | MNZ; FEA; 11 | MNZ; SPR; Ret | ALG; FEA; Ret | ALG; SPR; 4 | 8th | 30 |
| 2010 | Scuderia Coloni | CAT; FEA | CAT; SPR | MON; FEA | MON; SPR | IST; FEA | IST; SPR | VAL; FEA | VAL; SPR | SIL; FEA | SIL; SPR | HOC; FEA | HOC; SPR | HUN; FEA | HUN; SPR | SPA; FEA; 2 | SPA; SPR; 3 | MNZ; FEA; 12 | MNZ; SPR; 9 | YMC; FEA | YMC; SPR | 15th | 13 |
| 2011 | Racing Engineering | IST; FEA | IST; SPR | CAT; FEA; 11 | CAT; SPR; 7 | MON; FEA; 2 | MON; SPR; 16 | | | | | | | | | | | | | | | 16th | 8 |
| 2011 | Carlin | | | | | | | VAL; FEA; Ret | VAL; SPR; 18 | SIL; FEA; 9 | SIL; SPR; 9 | NÜR; FEA; 20† | NÜR; SPR; Ret | HUN; FEA | HUN; SPR | SPA; FEA | SPA; SPR | MNZ; FEA; 12 | MNZ; SPR; 12 | | | 16th | 8 |

=== Complete GP2 Asia Series results ===
(key) (Races in bold indicate pole position) (Races in italics indicate fastest lap)

| Year | Entrant | 1 | 2 | 3 | 4 | 5 | 6 | 7 | 8 | 9 | 10 | 11 | 12 | DC | Points |
|---|---|---|---|---|---|---|---|---|---|---|---|---|---|---|---|
| 2008–09 | Qi-Meritus Mahara | SHI; FEA | SHI; SPR | DUB; FEA | DUB; SPR | BHR1; FEA | BHR1; SPR | LSL; FEA; 17 | LSL; SPR; 16 | SEP; FEA; 11 | SEP; SPR; 9 | BHR2; FEA; Ret | BHR2; SPR; 13 | 21st | 1 |
| 2009–10 | Scuderia Coloni | YMC1; FEA | YMC1; SPR | YMC2; FEA | YMC2; SPR | BHR1; FEA; 6 | BHR1; SPR; Ret | BHR2; FEA; 4 | BHR2; SPR; 3 | | | | | 8th | 12 |

=== Complete Superleague Formula results ===
(key) (Races in bold indicate pole position) (Races in italics indicate fastest lap)

| Year | Team | 1 | 2 | 3 | 4 | 5 | 6 | 7 | 8 | 9 | 10 | 11 | 12 | 13 | 14 | 15 | 16 | 17 | 18 | 19 | 20 | 21 | 22 | 23 | 24 | Pos | Pts |
|---|---|---|---|---|---|---|---|---|---|---|---|---|---|---|---|---|---|---|---|---|---|---|---|---|---|---|---|
| 2009 | F.C. Porto Hitech Junior Team | MAG; 1 | MAG; 2 | ZOL; 1 | ZOL; 2 | DON; 1 | DON; 2 | EST; 1; 16 | EST; 2; 1 | MNZ; 1 | MNZ; 2 | JAR; 1 | JAR; 2 | | | | | | | | | | | | | 5th | 302 |
| 2010 | F.C. Porto Reid Motorsport | SIL; 1; 4 | SIL; 2; 5 | ASS; 1; 11 | ASS; 2; 16 | MAG; 1; 5 | MAG; 2; 11 | JAR; 1; 8 | JAR; 2; 11 | NÜR; 1; 17 | NÜR; 2; 1 | ZOL; 1; 11 | ZOL; 2; 12 | BRH; 1; 11 | BRH; 2; 4 | ADR; 1; 6 | ADR; 2; 11 | POR; 1; 3 | POR; 2; 17 | ORD; 1 | ORD; 2 | **BEI**; **1**; 15 | BEI; 2; 1 | NAV; 1; 8 | NAV; 2; 1 | 7th | 495 |

==== Super Final results ====
- Super Final results in 2009 did not count for points towards the main championship.

| Year | Team | 1 | 2 | 3 | 4 | 5 | 6 | 7 | 8 | 9 | 10 | 11 | 12 |
|---|---|---|---|---|---|---|---|---|---|---|---|---|---|
| 2009 | F.C. Porto Hitech Junior Team | MAG | ZOL | DON | EST; DNQ | MNZ | JAR | | | | | | |
| 2010 | F.C. Porto Reid Motorsport | SIL; 5 | ASS; DNQ | MAG; DNQ | JAR; DNQ | NÜR; DNQ | ZOL; DNQ | BRH; 6 | ADR; DNQ | POR; DNQ | ORD | BEI; C | NAV; 6 |

=== FIA GT competition results ===
==== GT1 World Championship results ====
| Year | Team | Car | 1 | 2 | 3 | 4 | 5 | 6 | 7 | 8 | 9 | 10 | 11 | 12 | 13 | 14 | 15 | 16 | 17 | 18 | Pos | Points |
|---|---|---|---|---|---|---|---|---|---|---|---|---|---|---|---|---|---|---|---|---|---|---|
| 2012 | Hexis Racing | McLaren | NOG; QR; 4 | NOG; CR; Ret | ZOL; QR; 10 | ZOL; CR; 7 | NAV; QR; 2 | NAV; QR; 4 | SVK; QR; Ret | SVK; CR; Ret | ALG; QR; 8 | ALG; CR; Ret | SVK; QR; 9 | SVK; CR; 9 | MOS; QR; 6 | MOS; CR; 2 | NÜR; QR; 5 | NÜR; CR; Ret | DON; QR; 3 | DON; CR; 3 | 11th | 65 |

=== FIA GT Series results ===
| Year | Team | Car | Class | 1 | 2 | 3 | 4 | 5 | 6 | 7 | 8 | 9 | 10 | 11 | 12 | Pos. | Points |
|---|---|---|---|---|---|---|---|---|---|---|---|---|---|---|---|---|---|
| 2013 | Sébastien Loeb Racing | McLaren MP4-12C GT3 | Pro | NOG; QR; 1 | **NOG**; **CR**; 12 | ZOL; QR; 17 | ZOL; CR; 13 | **ZAN**; **QR**; Ret | ZAN; CR; 14 | SVK; QR; 1 | **SVK**; **CR**; Ret | NAV; QR; 1 | **NAV**; **CR**; 1 | BAK; QR; 14 | BAK; CR; 2 | 4th | 82 |

=== Complete Blancpain GT Series Sprint Cup results ===
| Year | Team | Car | Class | 1 | 2 | 3 | 4 | 5 | 6 | 7 | 8 | 9 | 10 | 11 | 12 | 13 | 14 | Pos. | Points |
|---|---|---|---|---|---|---|---|---|---|---|---|---|---|---|---|---|---|---|---|
| 2014 | Bhaitech | McLaren MP4-12C GT3 | Pro | NOG; QR | NOG; CR | BRH; QR | BRH; CR | ZAN; QR | ZAN; CR | SVK; QR | SVK; CR | ALG; QR | ALG; CR | ZOL; QR | ZOL; CR | BAK; QR; 20 | BAK; CR; 16 | 56th | 0 |
| 2016 | Garage 59 | McLaren 650S GT3 | Pro | MIS; QR; 9 | MIS; CR; 4 | BRH; QR; 8 | BRH; CR; 4 | **NÜR**; **QR**; 2 | NÜR; CR; 1 | HUN; QR; 17 | HUN; CR; 17 | CAT; QR; 16 | CAT; CR; 13 | | | | | 6th | 56 |
| 2017 | Strakka Racing | McLaren 650S GT3 | Pro | MIS; QR; 22 | MIS; CR; 18 | BRH; QR; 6 | BRH; CR; 10 | ZOL; QR; 10 | ZOL; CR; 28 | HUN; QR; 20 | HUN; CR; 24 | NÜR; QR | NÜR; CR | | | | | 30th | 2 |

=== Complete Stock Car Brasil results ===
| Year | Team | Car | 1 | 2 | 3 | 4 | 5 | 6 | 7 | 8 | 9 | 10 | 11 | 12 | 13 | 14 | 15 | 16 | 17 | 18 | 19 | 20 | 21 | Rank | Points |
|---|---|---|---|---|---|---|---|---|---|---|---|---|---|---|---|---|---|---|---|---|---|---|---|---|---|
| 2014 | Voxx Racing | Peugeot 408 | INT; 1 Ret | SCZ; 1 | SCZ; 2 | BRA; 1 | BRA; 2 | GOI; 1 | GOI; 2 | GOI; 1 | CAS; 1 | CAS; 2 | CUR; 1 | CUR; 2 | VEL; 1 | VEL; 2 | SCZ; 1 | SCZ; 2 | TAR; 1 | TAR; 2 | SAL; 1 | SAL; 2 | CUR; 1 | NC† | 0† |
| 2015 | Voxx Racing | Peugeot 408 | GOI; 1; 7 | RBP; 1 | RBP; 2 | VEL; 1 | VEL; 2 | CUR; 1 | CUR; 2 | SCZ; 1 | SCZ; 2 | CUR; 1 | CUR; 2 | GOI; 1 | CAS; 1 | CAS; 2 | BRA; 1 | BRA; 2 | CUR; 1 | CUR; 2 | TAR; 1 | TAR; 2 | INT; 1 | NC† | 0† |

† Ineligible for championship points.

=== Complete FIA World Endurance Championship results ===
(key) (Races in bold indicate pole position; races in italics indicate fastest lap)

| Year | Entrant | Class | Car | Engine | 1 | 2 | 3 | 4 | 5 | 6 | 7 | 8 | 9 | Rank | Points |
|---|---|---|---|---|---|---|---|---|---|---|---|---|---|---|---|
| 2014 | Ram Racing | LMGTE Pro | Ferrari 458 Italia GT2 | Ferrari 4.5 L V8 | SIL; 6 | SPA | LMS; Ret | COA | FUJ | SHA | BHR | SÃO | | 27th | 8 |
| 2017 | Clearwater Racing | LMGTE Am | Ferrari 488 GTE | Ferrari F154CB 3.9 L Turbo V8 | SIL | SPA | LMS; 6 | NÜR | MEX | COA | FUJ | SHA | BHR | 10th | 16 |

=== 24 Hours of Le Mans results ===
| Year | Team | Co-Drivers | Car | Class | Laps | Pos. | Class Pos. |
|---|---|---|---|---|---|---|---|
| 2014 | (United Kingdom) Ram Racing | (Republic of Ireland) Matt Griffin (Italy) Federico Leo | Ferrari 458 Italia GTC | GTE; Pro | 140 | DNF | DNF |
| 2017 | (Singapore) Clearwater Racing | (Singapore) Richard Wee (Japan) Hiroki Katoh | Ferrari 488 GTE | GTE; Am | 327 | 40th | 11th |
| 2021 | (Chinese Taipei) Hub Auto Racing | (Belgium) Maxime Martin (Belgium) Dries Vanthoor | Porsche 911 RSR-19 | GTE; Pro | 227 | DNF | DNF |

=== Complete Bathurst 12 Hour results ===
| Year | Team | Co-Drivers | Car | Class | Laps | Pos. | Class Pos. |
|---|---|---|---|---|---|---|---|
| 2016 | (Australia) Tekno Autosports | (New Zealand) Shane van Gisbergen (Australia) Jonathon Webb | McLaren 650S GT3 | AP | 297 | **1st** | **1st** |
| 2017 | (Australia) Tekno Autosports | (United Kingdom) Rob Bell (France) Côme Ledogar | McLaren 650S GT3 | AP | 289 | 5th | **3rd** |

=== Complete Indian Racing League results ===
(key) (Races in bold indicate pole position) (Races in italics indicate fastest lap)

| Year | Franchise | 1 | 2 | 3 | 4 | 5 | 6 | 7 | 8 | 9 | 10 | Pos. | Pts |
|---|---|---|---|---|---|---|---|---|---|---|---|---|---|
| 2023‡ | Hyderabad Blackbirds | IRU1; 1 WD | IRU1; 2 | IRU2; 1 | IRU2; 2 | IRU3; 1 | IRU3; 2 | | | | | 6th | 56 |
| 2024‡ | Speed Demons Delhi | IRU1; 1; 2 | IRU1; 2 | IGR; 1 | **IGR**; **2**; 1 | IRU2; 1 | IRU2; 2 | KAR1; 1 | KAR1; 2; 3 | KAR2; 1; 3 | KAR2; 2 | 6th | 82 |

‡ Standings based on entry points, not individual drivers.

* Season in progress.

Sporting positions
| Preceded by Nelson Angelo Piquet | British Formula Three Champion; 2005 | Succeeded by Mike Conway |
| Preceded by Alx Danielsson | Formula Renault 3.5 Series; Champion; 2007 | Succeeded by Giedo van der Garde |
| Preceded by Daniel Zampieri; Roman Mavlanov | International GT Open champion 2015 with Miguel Ramos | Succeeded by Incumbent |
| Preceded by Katsumasa Chiyo; Wolfgang Reip; Florian Strauss | Winner of the Bathurst 12 Hour; 2016 (with Shane van Gisbergen and Jonathon Webb) | Succeeded by Craig Lowndes; Toni Vilander; Jamie Whincup |
