= Miguel Ramos =

Portuguese racing driver (born 1971)

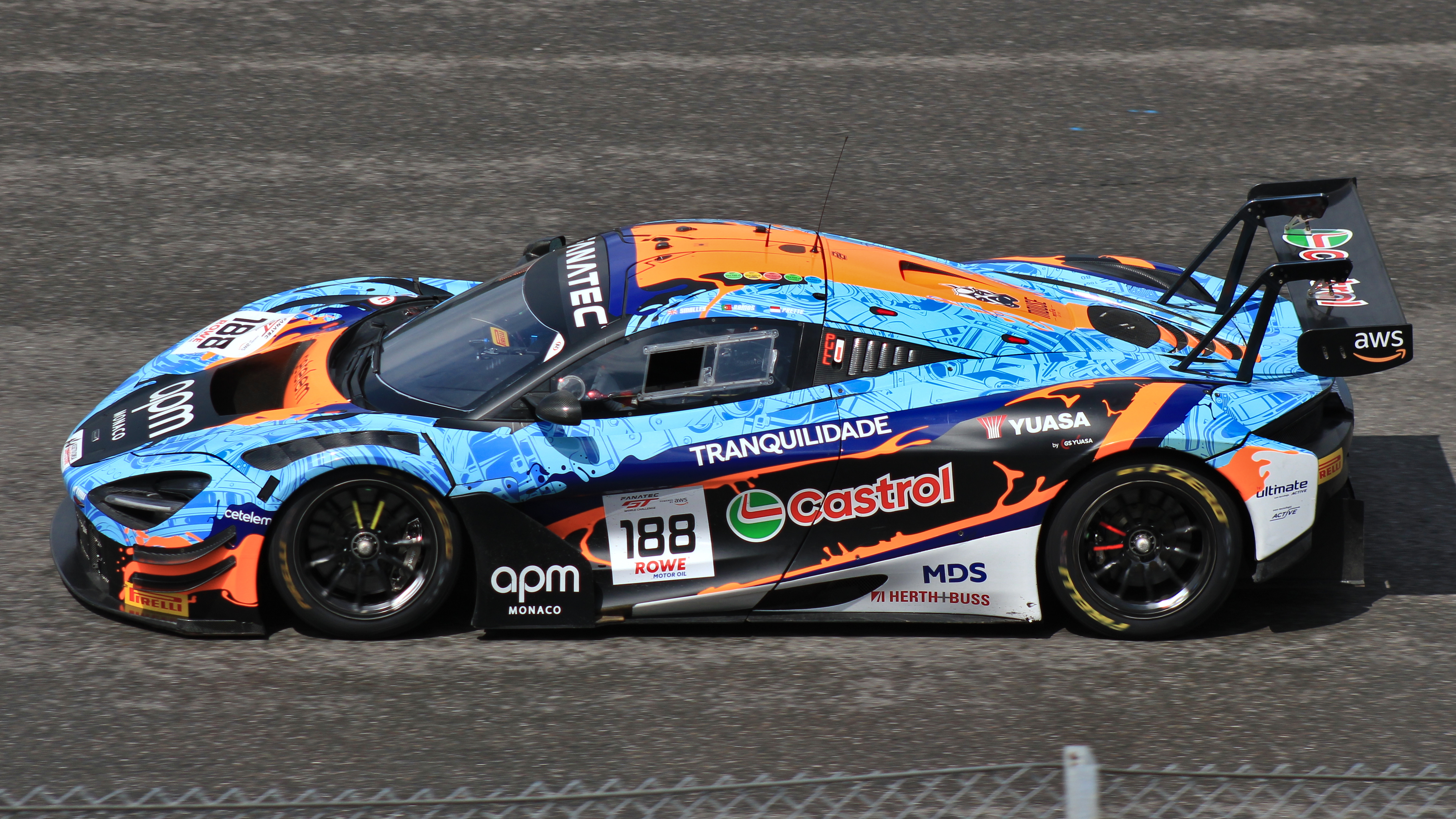
- Nationality: (Portugal) Portuguese
- Born: Miguel Pedro Caetano Ramos; 26 September 1971 (age 55) Porto (Portugal)

FIA GT1 World Championship career
- Debut season: 2010
- Current team: Vitaphone Racing
- Categorisation: FIA Silver (until 2017); FIA Bronze (2018–)
- Car number: 2
- Starts: 18
- Wins: 0
- Poles: 0
- Fastest laps: 0
- Best finish: 21st in 2010

Previous series
- 1994–1996 1995 1997 1998 1999–2000 2001–2002 2002 2003–04, 06–09 2004–2005 2005–2006: BMW Trophy Portugal; Portuguese Touring Car; Portuguese Racing; Italian Superturismo; Toyota Super Formula; Spanish Formula Three; Spanish GT; FIA GT; Le Mans Endurance Series; Italian GT

Championship titles
- 1996 2002 2005: BMW Trophy Portugal; Spanish GT w/(Chaves); Italian GT w/(Malucelli)

Miguel Pedro Caetano Ramos (born 26 September 1971 in Porto) is a Portuguese racing driver. He is a former Spanish and Italian GT champion, and has raced in the FIA GT1 World Championship and the 24 Hours of Le Mans. In 2012, he raced for V8 Racing, driving a Chevrolet Corvette C6.R in the International GT Open. In 2015 and 2016, he raced for Teo Martín Motorsport in the International GT Open.

== Early career ==
Ramos began his career in 1991, when he was only eighteen years old, racing in the Autocross National Championship. During three years, he won several races and two national titles in Division II (2WD Touring Cars), in 1992 and in 1993, respectively.

In 1994, Ramos switched to touring car racing and took part in the Troféu BMW M3/Mobil spec series, which at the time was the most powerful car in one-make series in Portugal. Ramos drove in the series for three years, finally taking the title in 1996 with six race wins. He then switched to the Portuguese Touring Car Championship in 1997, driving a BMW 320is with backing from the Portuguese BMW importer, taking third place overall. Winning one win in the final round of the series at the Ota Airport, he finished the championship in third position. He also took part in the Guia race of the Macau Grand Prix.

== Career in Italy and Spain ==
In 1998, Ramos became the first Portuguese driver to take part in the Italian Superturismo Championship. With a lack of familiarity of the tracks and the competition, he ended the Privateer drivers classification in sixth position, with five podiums.

In 1999, at 27 years old, Ramos entered the Toyota Super Formula, his debut with single seater racing, his best result a third place in 2000. In 2001, Ramos moved up to the new Spanish Formula Three Championship, ending the season in tenth place overall.

Ramos won the Spanish GT Championship in 2002 with a Saleen, having as team colleague Pedro Chaves. Also in 2002, he made his first participation in the 24 Hours of Le Mans. With the Ray Mallock Ltd. team, he achieved fifth place on the GTS class.

The following seasons, in the years 2003 and 2004, was full of challenges. Having as adversaries some of the world's best drivers — some of them ex-Formula 1 drivers — Ramos participated in the FIA GT Championship. Despite various impediments, he earned seven classifications in the first best ten positions. In 2004, he participated on the Le Mans Endurance Series in a prototype with RML team driving a MG Lola prototype, getting for his team fifth place on the championship.

In 2005, Ramos disputed until the last race first place in the Italian GT Championship. With the same Ferrari 550 Maranello, he defended Portugal at the Le Mans Series in the category of GT1. He participated in four of the five races achieving one first place in 1000km of Spa and two second places at Nürburgring and Istanbul.

In the 2006 season, Ramos returned to the most competitive GT world championship, the FIA GT Championship, with the Aston Martin DBR9 in the GT1 class. He achieved the 12th classification helping the team BMS Scuderia Italia to achieve second place in the GT1 Championship Teams. He also competed in a few races of the Italian GT Championship with the Maserati MC12 achieving two victories and one second place accumulating 38 points.

== Racing record ==
=== Complete GT1 World Championship results ===
| Year | Team | Car | 1 | 2 | 3 | 4 | 5 | 6 | 7 | 8 | 9 | 10 | 11 | 12 | 13 | 14 | 15 | 16 | 17 | 18 | 19 | 20 | Pos | Points |
|---|---|---|---|---|---|---|---|---|---|---|---|---|---|---|---|---|---|---|---|---|---|---|---|---|
| 2010 | Vitaphone Racing Team | Maserati | ABU; QR; Ret | ABU; CR; 6 | SIL; QR; 9 | SIL; CR; 15 | BRN; QR; 7 | BRN; CR; 6 | PRI; QR; 5 | PRI; CR; Ret | SPA; QR; 11 | SPA; CR; 4 | NÜR; QR; 7 | NÜR; CR; 12 | ALG; QR; 13 | ALG; CR; Ret | NAV; QR; Ret | NAV; CR; 12 | INT; QR | INT; CR | SAN; QR; 16 | SAN; CR; 4 | 21st | 28 |

=== 24 Hours of Le Mans results ===
| Year | Class | No | Tyres | Car | Team | Co-Drivers | Laps | Pos. | Class Pos. |
|---|---|---|---|---|---|---|---|---|---|
| 2002 | GTS | 68 | **D** | Saleen S7-R; Ford 7.0L V8 | (United Kingdom) Ray Mallock Ltd. (RML) | (Portugal) Pedro Chaves (United Kingdom) Gavin Pickering | 312 | 23rd | 5th |
| 2005 | GT1 | 51 | **P** | Ferrari 550-GTS Maranello; Ferrari F133 5.9L V12 | (Italy) BMS Scuderia Italia | (Italy) Fabrizio Gollin (Italy) Christian Pescatori | 67 | DNF | DNF |

=== Complete GT World Challenge Europe Sprint Cup results ===
(key) (Races in bold indicate pole position) (Races in italics indicate fastest lap)

| Year | Team | Car | Class | 1 | 2 | 3 | 4 | 5 | 6 | 7 | 8 | 9 | 10 | Pos. | Points |
|---|---|---|---|---|---|---|---|---|---|---|---|---|---|---|---|
| 2021 | Barwell Motorsport | Lamborghini Huracán GT3 Evo | Pro-Am | MAG; 1; 23 | MAG; 2; 16 | **ZAN**; **1**; 18 | **ZAN**; **2** DNS | MIS; 1; 18 | MIS; 2; 23 | **BRH**; **1**; 21 | **BRH**; **2**; 21 | VAL; 1; 20 | VAL; 2; 22 | 1st | 125 |
| 2022 | Garage 59 | McLaren 720S GT3 | Pro-Am | BRH; 1; 19 | BRH; 2; 22 | **MAG**; **1**; 18 | **MAG**; **2**; 21 | **ZAN**; **1** Ret | **ZAN**; **2**; 15 | **MIS**; **1**; 17 | **MIS**; **2**; 15 | VAL; 1; 20 | **VAL**; **2**; 21 | 1st | 119 |
| 2023 | Garage 59 | McLaren 720S GT3 Evo | Bronze | BRH; 1 | BRH; 2 | **MIS**; **1**; 13 | MIS; 2; 20 | HOC; 1; 29 | HOC; 2; 23 | VAL; 1; 22 | VAL; 2; 25 | ZAN; 1 | ZAN; 2 | 2nd | 60.5 |
| 2024 | Garage 59 | McLaren 720S GT3 Evo | Bronze | BRH; 1 | BRH; 2 | MIS; 1 | MIS; 2 | **HOC**; **1** Ret | **HOC**; **2**; 27 | MAG; 1; 30† | **MAG**; **2**; 20 | CAT; 1; 18 | CAT; 2 Ret | 11th | 18 |

^{†} Driver did not finish the race, but was classified as he completed over 90% of the race distance.

Sporting positions
| Preceded by Alberto Castello; Carlos Palau | Spanish GT Championship; Champion; 2002; With: Pedro Chaves | Succeeded by Gines Vivancos |
| Preceded by Gabriele Matteuzzi; Piergiuseppe Perazzini | Italian GT Championship; Champion; 2005; With: Matteo Malucelli | Succeeded by Toni Vilander |
| Preceded by Daniel Zampieri; Roman Mavlanov | International GT Open; Champion; 2015; With: Alvaro Parente | Succeeded by Thomas Biagi; Fabrizio Crestani |
| Preceded by Giacomo Altoè; Albert Costa | International GT Open; Champion; 2020; With: Henrique Chaves | Succeeded by Incumbent |
| Preceded by Eddie Cheever III; Chris Froggatt | GT World Challenge Europe Sprint Cup; Pro-Am Champion; 2021-2022; With: Henrique Chaves (2021) & Dean Macdonald (2022) | Succeeded by None (Class disbanded) |
