= Atlético de Madrid (Superleague Formula team) =

Spanish racing team

Atlético de Madrid SF Racing Team
Founded	2008
Country	Spain
Driver(s)	Andy Soucek (2008); Ho-Pin Tung (2009); María de Villota ('09, '10); John Martin (2010); Bruno Méndez (2010); Paul Meijer (2010)
First race	2008 Nürburgring
Last race	2010 Navarra
Rounds	23
Ch'ships	0
Total points	599 (including Super Finals)
2010 position	17th (265 pts)
Races / Poles / Wins / Podiums / F. Laps; 43 / 0 / 0 / 2 / 3
NOTE - Data not including Super Finals

Atlético de Madrid Superleague Formula team was a motor racing team representing Spain's Atlético Madrid in the Superleague Formula championship.

They finished 18th and last in the inaugural championship with driver Andy Soucek, having missed the first round of the season at Donington Park. They participated in the 2009 season with the Dutch-Chinese driver Ho-Pin Tung for the first 3 races. María de Villota replaced him for the last races of the season.

== Record ==
(key)

=== 2008 ===
Operator(s)	Driver(s)	1	2		3		4		5		6		Points	Rank
Operator(s)	Driver(s)	DON	NÜR		ZOL		EST		VAL		JER		Points	Rank
EuroInternational	(Spain) Andy Soucek		DN	9	5	13	6	17	16	12	16	18	132	18th

=== 2009 ===
- Super Final results in 2009 did not count for points towards the main championship.

Operator(s)	Driver(s)	1			2			3			4			5			6			Points	Rank
Operator(s)	Driver(s)	MAG			ZOL			DON			EST			MOZ			JAR			Points	Rank
Alan Docking Racing	(China) Ho-Pin Tung	14	12	X	18	2	–	9	7	X										202	15th
Alan Docking Racing	(Spain) María de Villota										14	13	X	14	10	–	17	7	X	202	15th

=== 2010 ===
Operator(s)	Driver(s)	1			2			3			4			5			6			7			8			9			10			NC			11			Points	Rank
Operator(s)	Driver(s)	SIL			ASS			MAG			JAR			NÜR			ZOL			BRH			ADR			POR			ORD			BEI			NAV			Points	Rank
Alpha Team / Alpha Motorsport	(Australia) John Martin	10	3	6																																		265	17th
Alpha Team / Alpha Motorsport	(Spain) María de Villota				16	14	X	15	6	X	EX*	DQ*	X	16	4	X	16	11	X	14	7	X	DN	DN	X	17	12	X							13	10	X	265	17th
Alpha Team / Alpha Motorsport	(Spain) Bruno Méndez																												9	14	X							265	17th
Alpha Team / Alpha Motorsport	(Netherlands) Paul Meijer																															14	5	C				265	17th

* María de Villota finished 12th in race one and retired in 17th from race two at Jarama. She was subsequently disqualified from race two, after the race had finished, for crashing into Sébastien Bourdais early on after spinning off the track herself. She was also excluded from the race one result and lost the 14 points she would have earned for that finish.

== Gallery ==
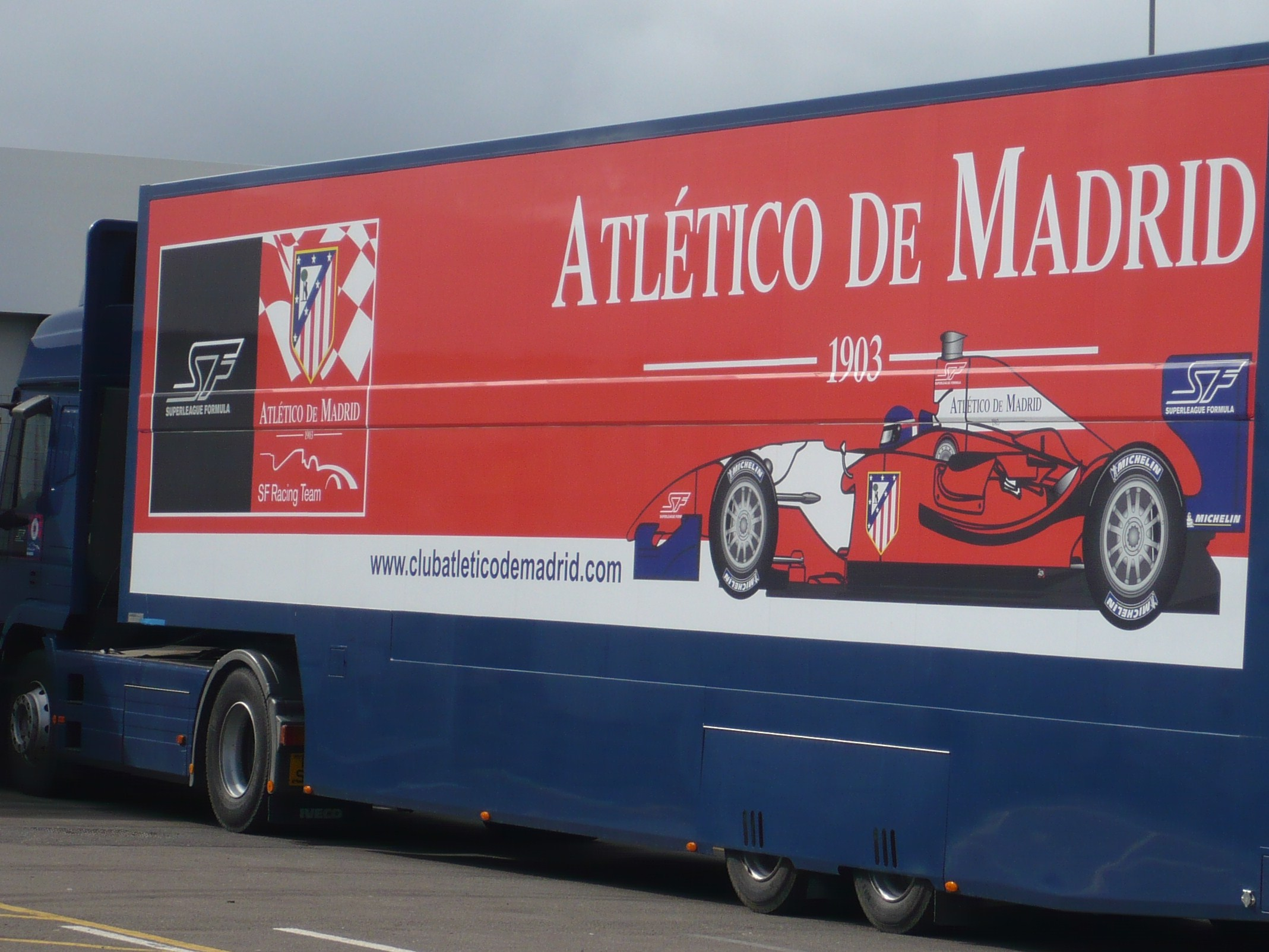
The Atlético de Madrid team truck in Silverstone Circuit's paddock (2010)

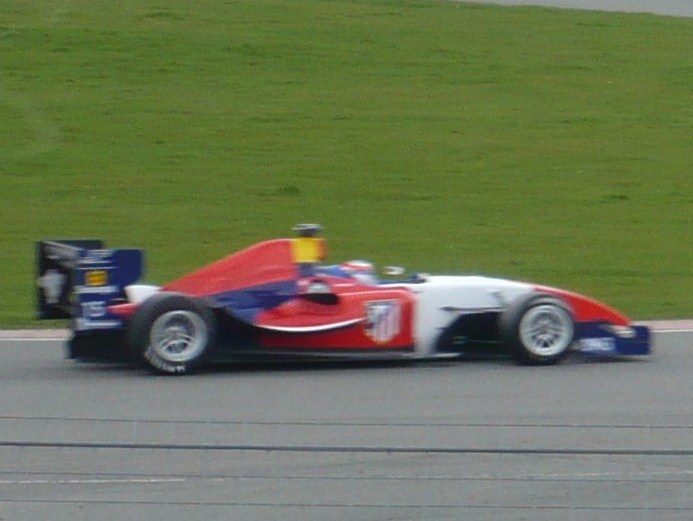
Atlético car on track at Silverstone (2010)

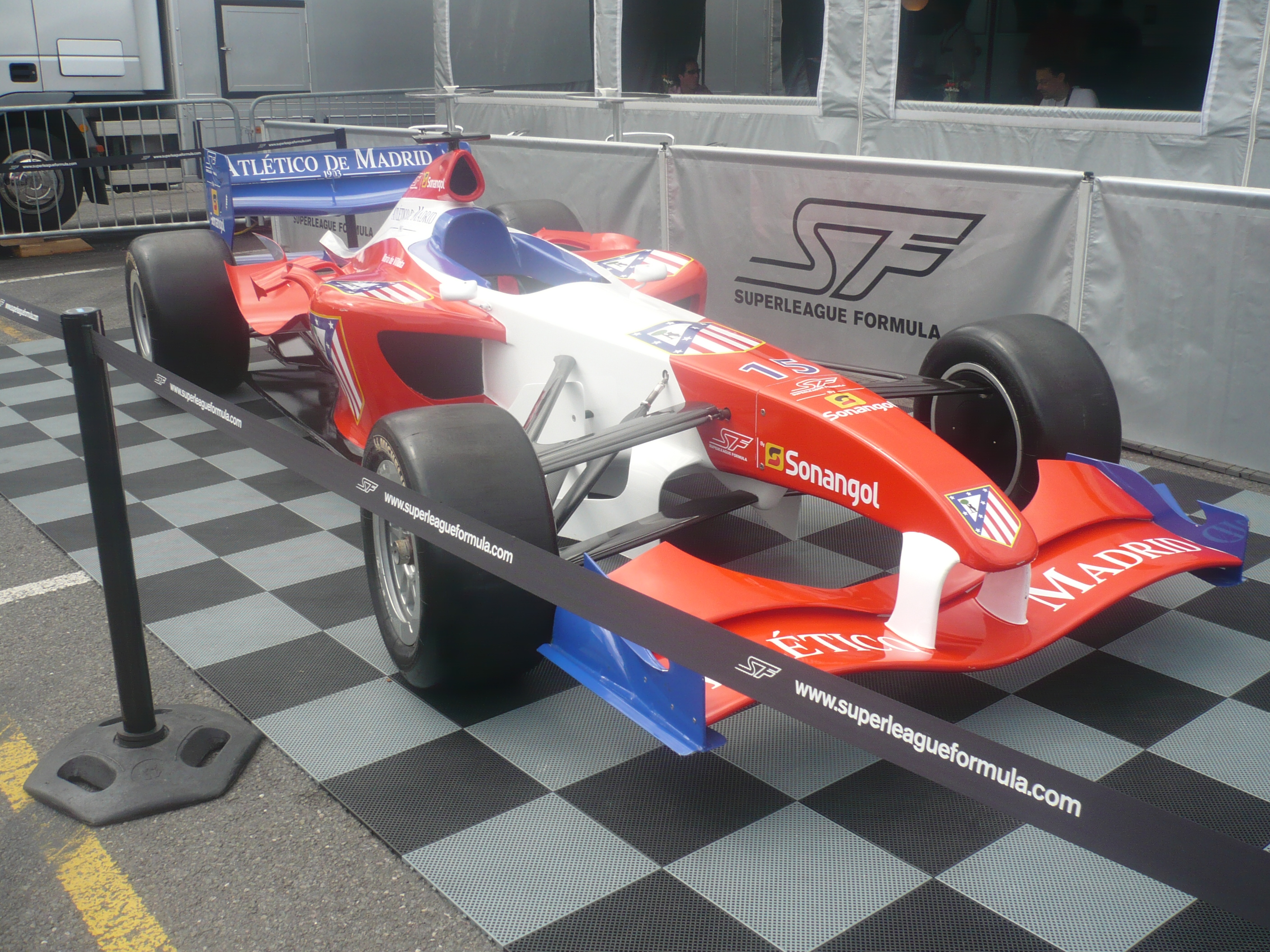
The Atlético de Madrid car on display at Brands Hatch (2010)
