= Andy Soucek =

Austrian-Spanish racing driver (born 1985)

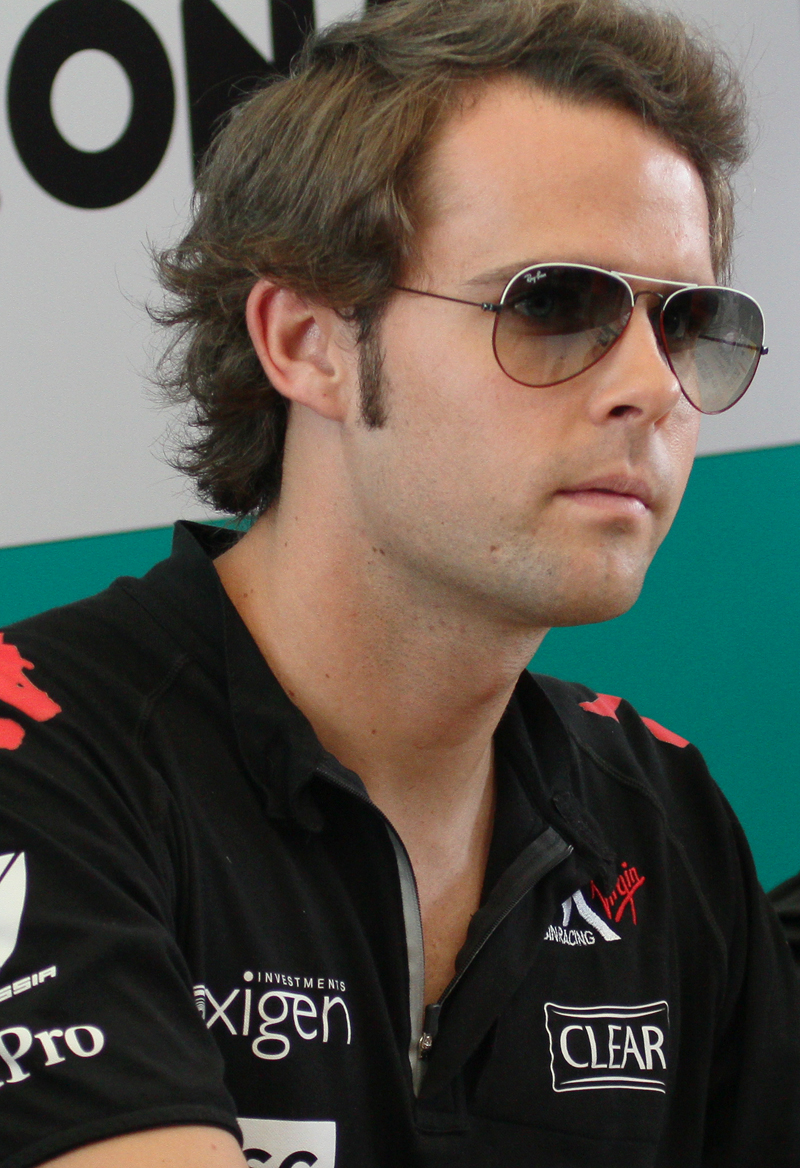
- Soucek in 2010
- Nationality: (Spain) Spanish (Austria) Austrian via dual nationality
- Born: Andy Christian Soucek Labelle; 14 June 1985 (age 41) Madrid, Spain
- Categorisation: FIA Platinum

Previous series
- 2009 2008 2008 2006-08 2002-05: FIA Formula Two; Superleague Formula; GP2 Asia Series; GP2 Series; Spanish F3 Championship

Championship titles
- 2005 2009: Spanish F3; FIA Formula Two

Andy Christian Soucek Labelle (Czech: Andy Christian Souček; born 14 June 1985) is a Spanish-Austrian former professional racing driver.

== Career ==
Soucek was born in Madrid, Spain. His father is an Austrian of Czech descent and his mother is French. He holds dual Austrian and Spanish nationality, although he was born in Spain and has spent all his life there. He races under the Spanish flag because he "feels Spanish".

=== Karting ===
Soucek's career started in professional karting events during 1997, although he would not make a formula debut until his Portuguese Formula Ford drive of 2001. In 2002, he continued with karting whilst driving in Spanish Formula Three. In 2003, he ended his karting commitments, moving to the EV team.

=== Formula Three ===
Soucek remained with EV during 2004 but would also drive two races for the GTA team. 2005 would be his key year, though, with Soucek's move to the Llusia team paying off after he won the title.

=== GP2 Series ===
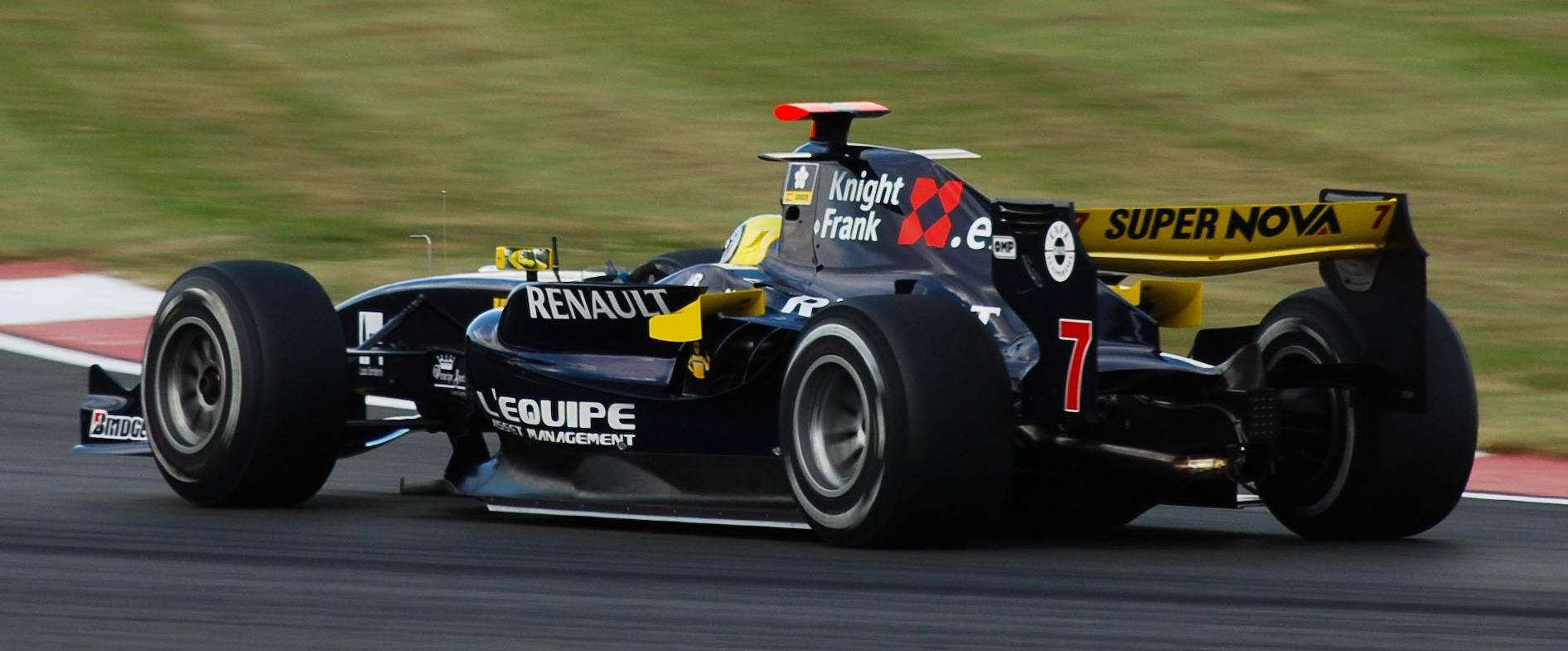
Soucek driving for Super Nova Racing at the Silverstone round of the 2008 GP2 Series season.

After being in contention for the 2006 Championship in the World Series by Renault, Soucek signed to race in the GP2 Series for 2007 with the DPR team. He remained with DPR for the first round of the 2008 GP2 Asia Series, but was dropped after signing for rival team FMS International for the premier 2008 championship. Surprisingly, with only five days to the 2008 championship start, FMS International terminated Soucek's contract unilaterally, replacing him with fellow Spaniard Roldán Rodríguez . This left Soucek without time to find a new team in time for the season start. A legal dispute resulted between Soucek and FMS International.

However, Soucek returned to race in the series after one round of the championship as a replacement for the injured Christian Bakkerud in the Super Nova team. After two races with Super Nova, Soucek then returned to the DPR team where he replaced Giacomo Ricci, himself substituting for the injured Michael Herck. and scoring his first championship point. Following his stint with DPR, Soucek returned once more to Super Nova as a permanent replacement for Bakkerud. He achieved one podium (at Hungaroring) and several more point finishes and ended the season tied with Roldán Rodríguez as best Spaniard.

=== Superleague Formula and Formula Two ===
Soucek also represented the Brazilian side Corinthians (managed by EuroInternational group) in the first race of the 2008 Superleague Formula season, as Corinthians main driver Antônio Pizzonia was unable to participate, because of his schedule in Stock Car Brasil.

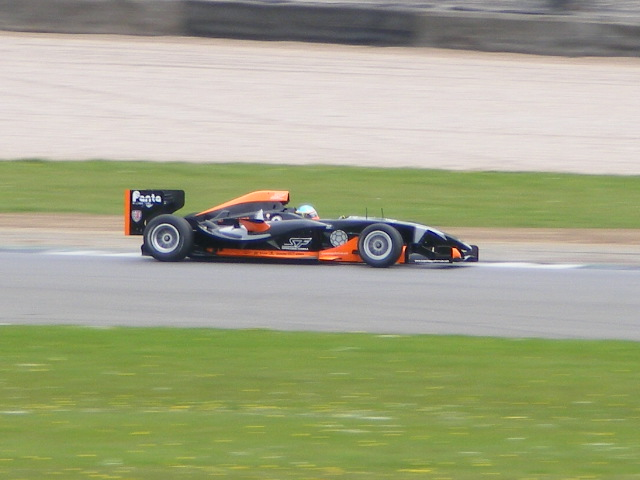
Soucek testing the Superleague Formula prototype car at Donington Park in 2008.

From the second race on, Soucek signed for Atlético Madrid to drive their car for the remainder of the 2008 Superleague Formula season.

In 2009, Soucek raced in the newly revived FIA Formula Two Championship, driving car number 22. Soucek clinched the title with three races to spare. As part of his prize for winning the championship, he tested for the Williams Formula One team on 1 December, setting the fastest time of the day.

=== Formula One ===
Soucek was confident of landing a Williams reserve drive in 2010. However, Williams signed Valtteri Bottas as their official reserve and test driver. Soucek instead signed as a test driver for Virgin Racing, joining Luiz Razia in that role. In August, Soucek left Virgin, stating that the team had broken their contract by not giving him any testing opportunities. In September 2010 he returned to Superleague Formula, racing for Galatasaray.

=== Sportscar racing ===
Subsequently, Soucek switched to racing GTs, making his debut in the final round of the 2012 Blancpain Endurance Series at the Circuito de Navarra for Boutsen Ginion Racing. Soucek then joined the leading ART Grand Prix to race a McLaren MP4-12C in the 2013 and 2014 Blancpain Endurance seasons, scoring four podiums.

Soucek's Bentley Continental GT3 at Monza in 2016.

Between 2015 and 2019, Soucek served as a Bentley factory driver. He peaked in the 2017 Blancpain GT Series Endurance Cup, where Soucek, Vincent Abril and Maxime Soulet finished as runners-up after a victory at the 1000 km Paul Ricard and second place at the 24 Hours of Spa.

In 2011, Soucek co-founded Integrated Racing Performance, a racing driver consultancy company, with Derrick Vopelka and Jorge Gil. Between 2020 and 2022, he was a sporting director at McLaren Barcelona. In November 2022, Soucek formally joined the Circuit of the Americas (COTA) as Vice President of Motorsports.

== Racing record ==
=== Complete Spanish Formula Three Championship results ===
(key) (Races in bold indicate pole position) (Races in italics indicate fastest lap)

Year	Entrant	1	2	3	4	5	6	7	8	9	10	11	12	13	14	15	DC	Points
2002	Racing Engineering	**ALB**; **1**; 9	ALB; 2; 4	JER; 1 Ret	JER; 2; 4	EST; 1; 6	EST; 2; 5	VAL; 5	JER; 1; 4	JER; 2; 5	JAR; 1; 11	JAR; 2; 10	CAT; 1; 6	CAT; 2 Ret			8th	117
2003	EV Racing	ALB; 1; 6	ALB; 2; 2	JAR; 1; 4	JAR; 2; 4	JER; 1; 4	JER; 2; 3	EST; 1 Ret	EST; 2; 7	VAL; 1; 10	**VAL**; **2** Ret	JER; 2	CAT; 1; 5	CAT; 2; 13			4th	136
2004	EV Racing	ALB; 1; 6	ALB; 2 Ret	JAR; 1; 2	JAR; 2; 3	JER; 1; 9	JER; 2; 6	EST; 1; 4	EST; 2; 4	VAL; 1; 5	VAL; 2; 7	JER; 1; 2	JER; 2 Ret				4th	74
2004	GTA Motor Competición													CAT; 1; 8	**CAT**; **2**; 2		4th	74
2005	Llusiá Racing	**JAR**; **1**; 2	JAR; 2; 8	VAL; 1; 5	VAL; 2 Ret	ALB; 4	**EST**; **1**; 1	EST; 2; 4	ALB; 1; 2	ALB; 2; 2	VAL; 1; 4	VAL; 2; 6	JER; 1; 1	JER; 2; 2	CAT; 1; 4	CAT; 2; 1	1st	112

=== Complete Formula Renault 3.5 Series results ===
(key) (Races in bold indicate pole position) (Races in italics indicate fastest lap)

Year	Entrant	1	2	3	4	5	6	7	8	9	10	11	12	13	14	15	16	17	DC	Points
2006	Interwetten.com	ZOL; 1 Ret	ZOL; 2; 5	MON; 1; 10	**IST**; **1**; 1	IST; 2; 12	MIS; 1; 2	MIS; 2; 5	SPA; 1; 3	SPA; 2; 3	NÜR; 1; 12	NÜR; 2; 3	DON; 1; 4	DON; 2; 5	LMS; 1; 7	LMS; 2 Ret	CAT; 1; 2	CAT; 2 NC	4th	101

=== Complete GP2 Series results ===
(key) (Races in bold indicate pole position) (Races in italics indicate fastest lap)

Year	Entrant	1	2	3	4	5	6	7	8	9	10	11	12	13	14	15	16	17	18	19	20	21	DC	Points
2007	DPR	BHR; FEA; 12	BHR; SPR; 9	CAT; FEA; 14	CAT; SPR; Ret	MON; FEA; 14	MAG; FEA; 13	MAG; SPR; 10	SIL; FEA; Ret	SIL; SPR; 20	NÜR; FEA; Ret	NÜR; SPR; 13	HUN; FEA; 12	HUN; SPR; Ret	IST; FEA; Ret	IST; SPR; Ret	MNZ; FEA; Ret	MNZ; SPR; 7	SPA; FEA; 6	SPA; SPR; 2	VAL; FEA; 6	VAL; SPR; 3	16th	15
2008	Super Nova Racing	CAT; FEA	CAT; SPR	IST; FEA; 19	IST; SPR; Ret			MAG; FEA; 13	MAG; SPR; Ret	SIL; FEA; 12	SIL; SPR; Ret	HOC; FEA; 7	HOC; SPR; Ret	HUN; FEA; 8	HUN; SPR; 2	VAL; FEA; 7	VAL; SPR; Ret	SPA; FEA; 6	SPA; SPR; Ret	MNZ; FEA; 9	MNZ; SPR; 18		14th	14
2008	DPR					MON; FEA; 13	MON; SPR; 6																14th	14

=== Complete Superleague Formula results ===
(Races in bold indicate pole position) (Races in italics indicate fastest lap)

Year	Team	1	2	3	4	5	6	7	8	9	10	11	12	13	14	15	16	17	18	19	20	21	22	23	24	Pos	Pts
2008	SC Corinthians EuroInternational	DON; 1; 11	DON; 2; 12																							9th	264
2008	Atlético Madrid EuroInternational			NÜR; 1 DNS	NÜR; 2; 9	ZOL; 1; 5	ZOL; 2; 13	EST; 1; 6	EST; 2; 17	VLL; 1; 16	VLL; 2; 12	JER; 1; 16	JER; 2; 18													18th	132
2010	Sporting CP Atech GP/Reid Motorsport	SIL; 1	SIL; 2	ASS; 1	ASS; 2	MAG; 1	MAG; 2	JAR; 1	JAR; 2	NÜR; 1	NÜR; 2	ZOL; 1; 9	ZOL; 2; 6	BRH; 1; 3	BRH; 2; 15	ADR; 1	ADR; 2									15th	329
2010	Galatasaray S.K. Barazi-Epsilon																	POR; 1; 9	POR; 2; 5							13th	358
2010	CR Flamengo Alpha Motorsport/ADR																			ORD; 1; 17	ORD; 2; 3	BEI; 1 DNS	BEI; 2 DNS	NAV; 1; 4	NAV; 2; 18	6th	540
2011	Turkey – Galatasaray S.K. EmiliodeVillota Motorsport	ASS; 1; 13	ASS; 2; 7																							10th	88
2011	Spain – Atlético de Madrid EmiliodeVillota Motorsport			ZOL; 1; 13	ZOL; 2; 14																					15th	28

==== Super Final Results ====
(Races in bold indicate pole position) (Races in italics indicate fastest lap)

Year	Team	1	2	3	4	5	6	7	8	9	10	11	12
2010	Sporting CP Atech GP/Reid Motorsport	SIL	ASS	MAG	JAR	NÜR	ZOL; DNQ	BRH; DNQ	ADR				
2010	Galatasaray S.K. Barazi-Epsilon									POR; DNQ			
2010	CR Flamengo Alpha Motorsport/ADR										ORD; DNQ	BEI; C	NAV; DNQ
2011	Turkey – Galatasaray S.K. EmiliodeVillota Motorsport	ASS; DNQ											
2011	Spain – Atlético de Madrid EmiliodeVillota Motorsport		ZOL; DNQ										

=== Complete FIA Formula Two Championship results ===
(key) (Races in bold indicate pole position) (Races in italics indicate fastest lap)

Year	1	2	3	4	5	6	7	8	9	10	11	12	13	14	15	16	DC	Points
2009	VAL; 1 Ret	VAL; 2; 4	BRN; 1; 17	BRN; 2; 1	SPA; 1; 4	SPA; 2; 2	BRH; 1; 2	**BRH**; **2**; 1	DON; 1; 1	DON; 2; 4	**OSC**; **1**; 1	OSC; 2; 2	IMO; 1; 3	IMO; 2; 1	CAT; 1; 1	CAT; 2; 1	**1st**	**115**

=== Complete Blancpain GT Series Sprint Cup results ===
Year	Team	Car	Class	1	2	3	4	5	6	7	8	9	10	11	12	13	14	Pos.	Points
2014	Beechdean AMR	Aston Martin V12 Vantage GT3	Pro	NOG; QR	NOG; CR	BRH; QR	BRH; CR	ZAN; QR	ZAN; CR	SVK; QR	SVK; CR	ALG; QR	ALG; CR	ZOL; QR; 5	ZOL; CR; 5	BAK; QR; 2	BAK; CR; 2	9th	36
2016	Bentley Team M-Sport	Bentley Continental GT3	Pro	MIS; QR; 1	MIS; CR; 11	BRH; QR; 10	BRH; CR; 3	NÜR; QR; 6	NÜR; CR; 32	HUN; QR; 16	HUN; CR; 9	CAT; QR; 4	CAT; CR; 2					8th	47
2017	Bentley Team M-Sport	Bentley Continental GT3	Pro	MIS; QR; Ret	MIS; CR; DNS	BRH; QR; 24	BRH; CR; 18	ZOL; QR; 15	ZOL; CR; 18	HUN; QR; 6	HUN; CR; 25	NÜR; QR; 4	NÜR; CR; 15					25th	4

Sporting positions
Preceded by Borja García	Spanish Formula Three champion 2005	Succeeded by Ricardo Risatti
Preceded by Mike Thackwell (1984 European Formula Two)	FIA Formula Two champion 2009	Succeeded by Dean Stoneman
