= Ianina Zanazzi =

Argentine racecar driver

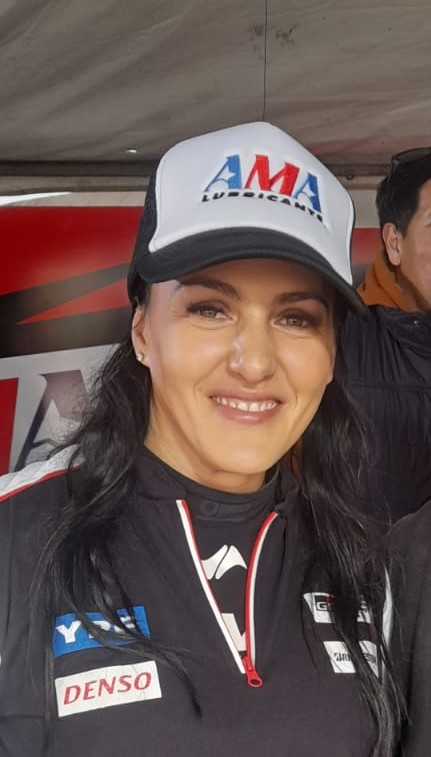
- Nationality: Argentinian
- Born: January 7, 1982 (age 44) Buenos Aires, Argentina

Ianina Zanazzi (born January 7, 1982) is an Argentinian professional racecar driver. She was born in Buenos Aires, Argentina, and started her career in karting in 1996, moving to Argentinian Formula Hyundai for the 1997 season. In 1998, she competed in both Argentinian Formula Honda and Argentinian Formula Renault. She moved to the Formula Super Renault for 1999, where she claimed a win at Río Cuarto, a first for a woman in Argentine formula racing. Zanazzi moving to Formula Three Sudamericana in 2000, in the B-Class. In 2001, she moved to the main class, but only competed in part of the season's schedule. She also competed in a part season of Spanish Formula Three in 2002.

== Sabotage ==
On June 1, 2000, Zanazzi was testing her Formula 3 Light car at Río Cuarto circuit and had a spun off due to an oil spot on the asphalt. She did not suffer any damage in the incident, but found clues of sabotage near the zone, and later on it was said that she pointed to team-mate Mariano Bainotti as responsible for such a personal attack on her. However, Zanazzi refused having said that. Bainotti then threatened Zanazzi to sue her for lying, but nothing has happened since.
