= María de Villota =

Spanish racing driver

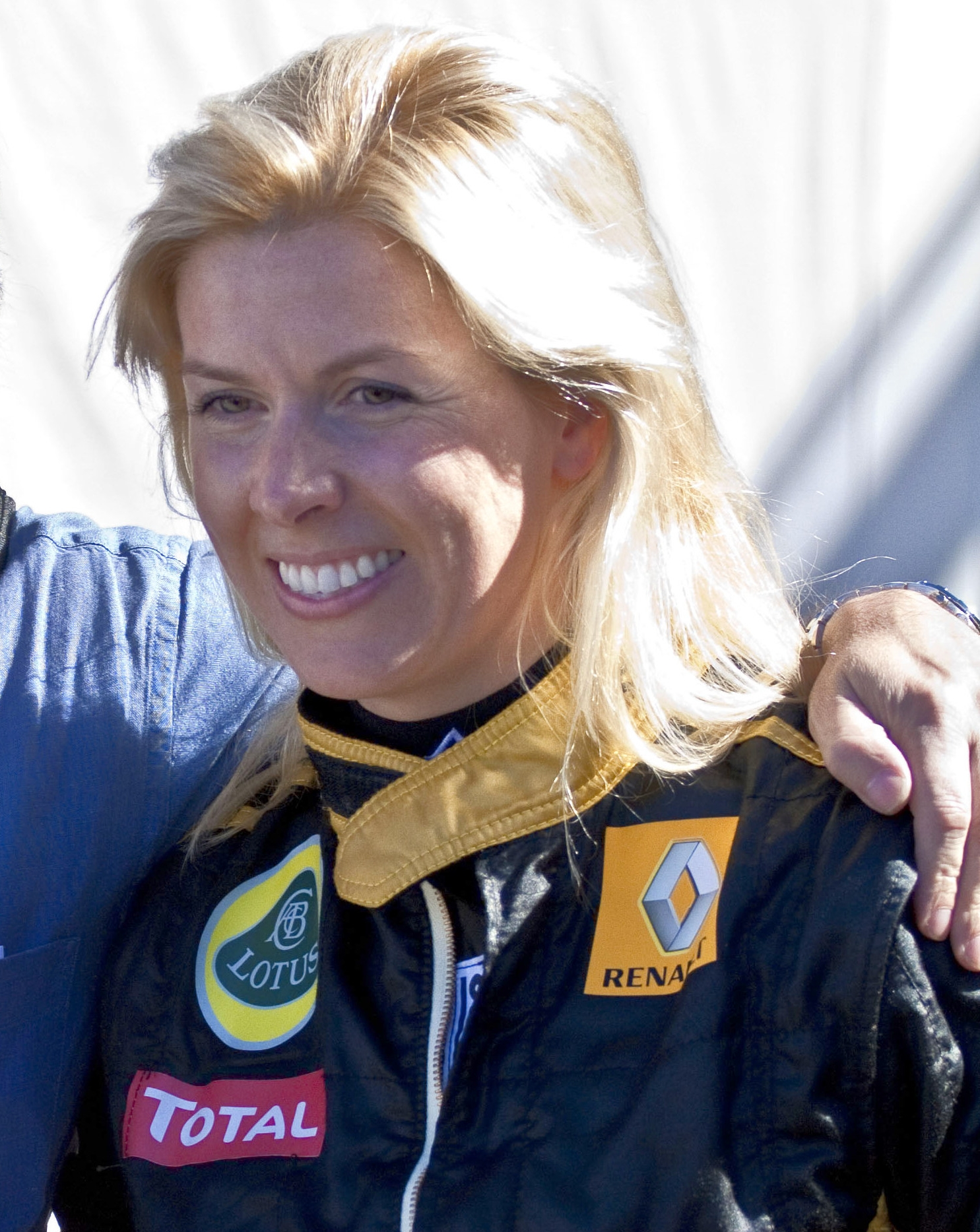
- María de Villota in 2011
- Nationality: (Spain) Spanish
- Born: María Isabel de Villota Comba; 13 January 1979 Madrid, Spain
- Died: 11 October 2013 (aged 34) Seville, Spain
- Relatives: Emilio de Villota (father); Emilio de Villota Jr. (brother)

Previous series
- 2009–2011 2009 2009 2008 2008 2007 2007, 2010 2006–07 2005–06 2001–05: Superleague Formula; Formula Palmer Audi; Trofeo Abarth Europe; Euroseries 3000; Italian Superstars; ADAC Procar – Division I Spanish GT Championship; WTCC; Ferrari Challenge Europe; Spanish F3

María Isabel de Villota Comba (13 January 1979 – 11 October 2013) was a Spanish racing driver who competed in Superleague Formula and Euroseries 3000. She had an accident in straight-line testing as the Marussia Formula One team test driver, where she suffered serious head and facial injuries, and died one year later.

De Villota was the daughter of former Formula One driver Emilio de Villota, and sister of Emilio de Villota Jr., who similarly competed in Formula Palmer Audi.

== Early career ==
De Villota was born in Madrid. She competed in numerous racing series, including the World Touring Car Championship and the ADAC Procar Series in 2007. In August 2009, she signed with Atlético Madrid to race for the remainder of the season in the Superleague Formula open wheel racing series. She remained with the Atlético Madrid team until the series folded in 2011. She also competed in the 2005 24 Hours of Daytona endurance race.

== Formula One ==
On 18 August 2011, the Lotus Renault GP team confirmed reports that de Villota had made her Formula One test debut in a Renault R29 at the Paul Ricard Circuit, and that her management was in talks to secure her a test driver seat in the future. In December, she reiterated her desire to work with the team in 2012, adding that she was in advanced talks over a third driver role.

On 7 March 2012, it was announced that de Villota had joined Marussia F1 Team as a test driver, with the opportunity to sample Formula One machinery later in the year.

=== Duxford Aerodrome testing accident ===
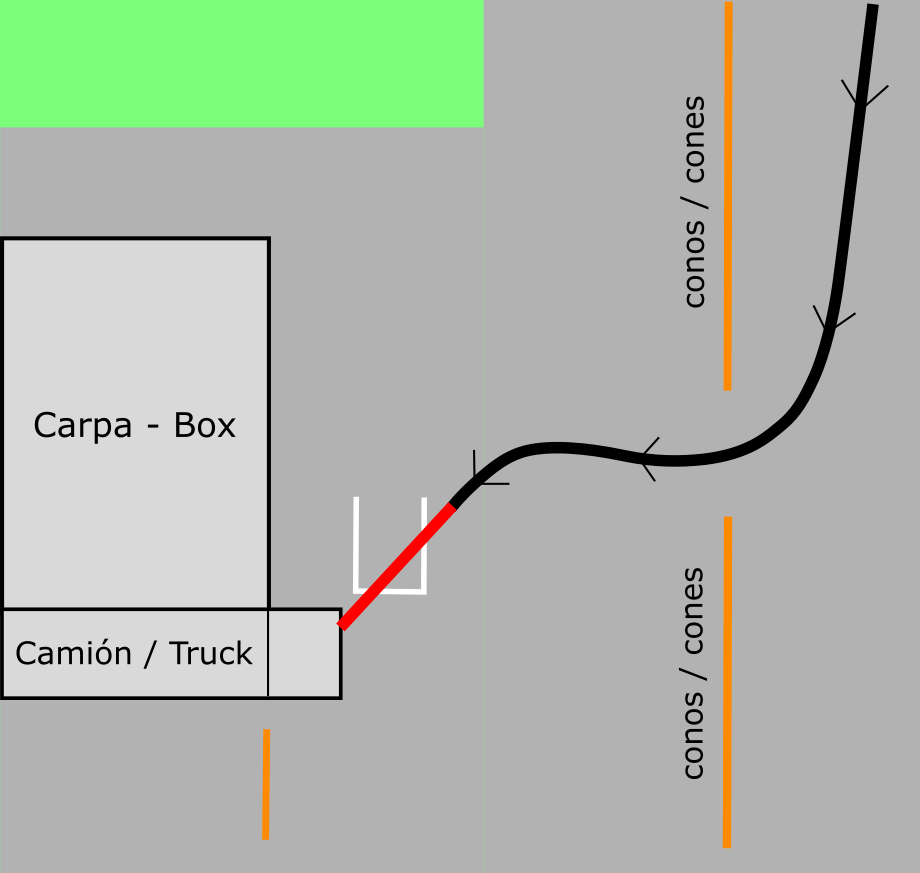
Simple infographic of de Villota's crash in 2012 with Marussia F1

At approximately 9:30 on 3 July 2012, de Villota was involved in an accident at Duxford Aerodrome in England while carrying out straight-line testing for Marussia, her first time in the car. Her car crashed into a stationary truck at the end of a test run when it had just returned to the service area. A BBC reporter who witnessed the accident estimated the car was travelling at between 30 and 40 mph (50 and 65 km/h) when it crashed. It took an hour for her to be removed from the car and she was taken to Addenbrooke's Hospital in Cambridgeshire with life-threatening head and facial injuries. She was later reported to be conscious. The following day, Marussia team principal John Booth said de Villota remained in a "critical but stable" condition in hospital and had lost her right eye.

On 6 July, the Marussia Technical Centre said that following an operation that day, her condition in relation to her head injury had improved. On 16 July, Marussia said the car was not at fault. Team principal John Booth said: "We are satisfied the findings of our internal investigation exclude the car as a factor in the accident". After a stay of 17 days, de Villota left the hospital and returned to Spain, having escaped severe neurological damage.

De Villota made her first public appearance since the accident in October 2012, giving an exclusive interview to ¡Hola! magazine and then hosting a press conference for the general media. She revealed that she had lost her senses of smell and taste, still suffered from headaches, and was scheduled to undergo further surgery, but that she was open to a future return to racing if she were to be granted a licence, and that she also wished to become involved in promoting safety improvements in motorsport. She released a computer graphic which showed the extent of her initial cranial injuries.

In 2015, an official report compiled by the Health and Safety Executive concluded that de Villota had not received full guidance on how to stop the car, and was caught out by its anti-stall system, which activated as she attempted to brake to a standstill and pushed the car forward into the tail-lift of the team's service truck.

== Personal life ==
De Villota married Rodrigo García Millán, a personal trainer and owner of Oxigeno Training, on 28 July 2013 in Seville, less than three months before her death.

== Death ==
On the morning of 11 October 2013, exactly one year from her first public appearance after her testing accident, Spanish media reported that de Villota, aged 34, had been found dead in her Seville hotel room; Eurosport reported that her family had confirmed her death. An autopsy confirmed de Villota had suffered a cardiac arrest. While her death was initially reported to be by "absolutely natural causes", according to a statement released by her family, a forensic doctor later found that de Villota's death was a consequence of neurological injuries suffered in her F1 testing crash the previous year.

At the time of her death, de Villota was scheduled to participate as a speaker at the Seville Fundación Lo Que De Verdad Importa (LQDVI) conference and was due to launch her autobiography Life Is a Gift on 14 October. Her remains were cremated on 12 October 2013 in Seville. A minute's silence was held for her before the 2013 Japanese Grand Prix on 13 October.

== Legacy ==
The Circuito del Jarama has organised two tributes to her. On 5 July 2017, the final turn on the circuit that leads to the pit straight was named Curva María de Villota in her memory; in Formula E, it is the penultimate corner, as a chicane is located on the exit of the turn. The circuit since 2014 organised an annual Christmas Eve foot race at the circuit, the María de Villota 10 km and 5 km, as a fundraiser.

A foundation called Maria de Villota's Legacy (Legado María de Villota) was created in 2014 by the Young Sport Foundation in her memory. This foundation includes the First Star Project, which provides treatment to children with genetic neuromuscular illnesses. Formula One driver Carlos Sainz Jr., who was mentored by de Villota while karting, carries de Villota's star on his helmets and was named Ambassador of Maria de Villota's Legacy in 2016.

== Books ==
- La vida es un regalo ("Life Is a Gift", 2013) ISBN 9788415880394

== Decorations ==
- Golden Medal of the Royal Order of Sports Merit (Real Orden del Mérito Deportivo, 29/10/2013).

== Motorsports career results ==
=== Grand-Am Series ===
Grand-Am Road Racing results
| Year | Team | Make | Class | 1 | 2 | 3 | 4 | 5 | 6 | 7 | 8 | 9 | 10 | 11 | 12 | 13 | 14 | Position | Points |
|---|---|---|---|---|---|---|---|---|---|---|---|---|---|---|---|---|---|---|---|
| 2005 | Mastercar | Ferrari 360 Challenge | GT | DAY; 25/10 | HOM | CAL | LAG | CMT | WAT1 | BAR | WAT2 | DAY2 | MOH | PHX | WAT3 | VIR | MEX | 103rd | 21 |

=== World Touring Car Championship ===
(key) (Races in bold indicate pole position) (Races in italics indicate fastest lap)

World Touring Car Championship results
| Year | Team | Car | 1 | 2 | 3 | 4 | 5 | 6 | 7 | 8 | 9 | 10 | 11 | 12 | 13 | 14 | 15 | 16 | 17 | 18 | 19 | 20 | 21 | 22 | DC | Points |
|---|---|---|---|---|---|---|---|---|---|---|---|---|---|---|---|---|---|---|---|---|---|---|---|---|---|---|
| 2006 | Maurer Motorsport | Chevrolet Lacetti | ITA; 1 | ITA; 2 | FRA; 1 | FRA; 2 | GBR; 1 | GBR; 2 | GER; 1 | GER; 2 | BRA; 1 | BRA; 2 | MEX; 1 | MEX; 2 | CZE; 1 | CZE; 2 | TUR; 1 | TUR; 2 | ESP; 1; 21 | ESP; 2 Ret | MAC; 1 | MAC; 2 | | | NC | 0 |
| 2007 | Maurer Motorsport | Chevrolet Lacetti | BRA; 1 | BRA; 2 | NED; 1 | NED; 2 | ESP; 1; 18 | ESP; 2; 20 | FRA; 1 | FRA; 2 | CZE; 1 | CZE; 2 | POR; 1 | POR; 2 | SWE; 1 | SWE; 2 | GER; 1 | GER; 2 | GBR; 1 | GBR; 2 | ITA; 1 | ITA; 2 | MAC; 1 | MAC; 2 | NC | 0 |

=== Euroseries 3000 ===
(key) (Races in bold indicate pole position) (Races in italics indicate fastest lap)

Euroseries 3000 results
| Year | Team | 1 | 2 | 3 | 4 | 5 | 6 | 7 | 8 | 9 | 10 | 11 | 12 | 13 | 14 | 15 | 16 | Pos | Points |
|---|---|---|---|---|---|---|---|---|---|---|---|---|---|---|---|---|---|---|---|
| 2008 | Emilio de Villota Motorsport | VLL; 1 | VLL; 2 | SPA; 1; 7 | SPA; 2 C | VAL; 1 | VAL; 2 | MUG; 1 | MUG; 2 | MIS; 1 | MIS; 2 | JER; 1 | JER; 2 | CAT; 1 | CAT; 2 | MGI; 1 | MGI; 2 | 22nd | 2 |

=== Superleague Formula ===
(key) (Races in bold indicate pole position) (Races in italics indicate fastest lap)

Superleague Formula results
| Year | Operator | Team | 1 | | | 2 | | | 3 | | | 4 | | | 5 | | | 6 | | | 7 | | | 8 | | | 9 | | | 10 | 11 | 12 | | | Position | Points |
| 2009 | Atlético Madrid | Alan Docking Racing | MAG | | | ZOL | | | DON | | | EST | | | MOZ | | | JAR | | | | | | | | | | | | | | | | | 15th | 202 |
|---|---|---|---|---|---|---|---|---|---|---|---|---|---|---|---|---|---|---|---|---|---|---|---|---|---|---|---|---|---|---|---|---|---|---|---|---|
| 2009 | Atlético Madrid | Alan Docking Racing | | | | | | | | | | 14 | 13 | | 14 | 10 | | 17 | 7 | | | | | | | | | | | | | | | | 15th | 202 |
| 2010 | Atlético Madrid | Alan Docking Racing | SIL | | | ASS | | | MAG | | | JAR | | | NÜR | | | ZOL | | | BRH | | | ADR | | | POR | | | ORD | BEI † | NAV | | | 17th | 265 |
| 2010 | Atlético Madrid | Alan Docking Racing | | | | 16 | 14 | X | 15 | 6 | X | EX* | DQ* | X | 16 | 4 | X | 16 | 11 | X | 14 | 7 | X | DNS | DNS | X | 17 | 12 | X | | | 13 | 10 | X | 17th | 265 |
| 2011 | Spain – Atlético de Madrid | Emilio de Villota Motorsport | HOL | | | BEL | | | | | | | | | | | | | | | | | | | | | | | | | | | | | 15th | 28 |
| 2011 | Spain – Atlético de Madrid | Emilio de Villota Motorsport | 12 | 12 | X | | | | | | | | | | | | | | | | | | | | | | | | | | | | | | 15th | 28 |

† Non Championship round
