= Marcel Costa =

Spanish auto racing driver

Marcel Costa Gras (born 4 November 1978 in Guardiola de Berguedà) is a Spanish auto racing driver.

== Career ==
Costa was the 2002 Spanish Formula Three Champion, yet after a season in the Spanish GT Series, where he was a class champion, Costa spent 2004 and 2005 in the motor racing wilderness, with just a win in the Barcelona 24 Hours to his credit. However, after the dismissal of Antonio García by BMW Team Italy-Spain (run by Roberto Ravaglia), a driver shoot-out was prepared for Costa and fellow Spaniard Ander Vilariño, which Costa won.

In 2006, Costa competed for the works BMW Team Italy-Spain in the FIA World Touring Car Championship, with the all new BMW 320si. After a poor start to the season with no points scored, Costa was replaced in the team after just four rounds by experienced Dutch driver Duncan Huisman.

== Racing record ==
=== Complete World Touring Car Championship results ===
(key) (Races in bold indicate pole position) (Races in italics indicate fastest lap)

| Year | Team | Car | 1 | 2 | 3 | 4 | 5 | 6 | 7 | 8 | 9 | 10 | 11 | 12 | 13 | 14 | 15 | 16 | 17 | 18 | 19 | 20 | DC | Points |
|---|---|---|---|---|---|---|---|---|---|---|---|---|---|---|---|---|---|---|---|---|---|---|---|---|
| 2006 | BMW Team Italy-Spain | BMW 320si | ITA; 1; 11 | ITA; 2 Ret | FRA; 1 Ret | FRA; 2 Ret | GBR; 1; 11 | GBR; 2 Ret | GER; 1; 18 | GER; 2; 16 | BRA; 1 | BRA; 2 | MEX; 1 | MEX; 2 | CZE; 1 | CZE; 2 | TUR; 1 | TUR; 2 | ESP; 1 | ESP; 2 | MAC; 1 | MAC; 2 | NC | 0 |

Sporting positions
| Preceded by Philippe Bénoliel | Formula Campus Champion; 1997 | Succeeded by Westley Barber |
| Preceded by Ander Vilariño | Spanish Formula Three champion 2002 | Succeeded by Ricardo Maurício |
