= 2011 Zolder Superleague Formula round =

2011 Zolder Superleague Formula round Superleague Formula round Belgium
- Circuit Map
- Date: July 17, 2011
- Location: Circuit Zolder, Heusden-Zolder, Belgium
- Course: Permanent racing facility 2.492 mi (4.010 km)
Pole position
Podium (1st race)
Fastest lap (1st race)
- Time: (on lap )
Podium (2nd race)
Fastest lap (2nd race)
- Time: (on lap )

The 2011 Zolder Superleague Formula round, also referred to as the 2011 Superleague Formula GP Belgium will be a Superleague Formula round held on July 17, 2011, at Circuit Zolder, Heusden-Zolder, Belgium. It will be the fourth year in a row that Superleague Formula visits the Zolder circuit, making it the only circuit to feature on the calendar every year until 2011. It will be the second and final showdown, or 'Grand Prix', of the 2011 Superleague Formula season.

Fourteen cars took part in the previous round at Assen and fourteen will race in Zolder, although they are not all the same cars. Belgian entrant R.S.C. Anderlecht will take part.

Support races will include the Dutch Supercar Challenge, HTC Dutch GT4 / GT4 Europe, Formido Swift Cup and Formula Ford.
