= Emilio de Villota Jr. =

Spanish racing driver (born 1980)

- Nationality: Spanish
- Born: Emilio Isidro de Villota Comba; 9 December 1980 (age 45) Madrid, Spain
- Relatives: Emilio de Villota (father); María de Villota (sister)

Emilio Isidro de Villota Comba (born 9 December 1980), commonly known as Emilio de Villota Jr., is a Spanish motorsport executive and former racing driver, son of former Aurora champion Emilio de Villota and younger brother of the late María de Villota. He has competed in such series as Euroseries 3000, F3000 International Masters, Porsche Supercup and the Spanish Formula Three Championship.

De Villota was born on 9 December 1980. His father, Emilio de Villota, competed in Formula One racing. His sister, María de Villota, was also a race car driver. in the 2008 Spanish Formula 3 championship, he was Pons team manager. He was still Pons team manager in 2015.
