= 2017 V de V Proto Endurance Challenge =

The 2017 V de V Proto Endurance Series was the sixteenth consecutive season for the Group CN based series sanctioned by V de V Sports.

== Entry list ==
=== CN A ===
Team	Chassis	Engine	No.	Drivers	Round
TFT Racing	Norma M20-FC	Honda K20A 2.0L I4	2	(Spain) Ander Vilariño (France) Alain Ferté (France) Philippe Illiano	1
TFT Racing	Norma M20-FC	Honda K20A 2.0L I4	5	(France) Philippe Cimadomo (United Kingdom) Jean-Lou Rihon (United Kingdom) Simon Phillips	1
TFT Racing	Norma M20-FC	Honda K20A 2.0L I4	6	(France) Bruno Bazaud (France) Philippe Thirion (France) Denis Caillon	1
TFT Racing	Norma M20-FC	Honda K20A 2.0L I4	8	(France) Vincent Capillaire (France) Erwin Creed (Russia) Ilya Melnikov	1
Graff	Norma M20-FC	Honda K20A 2.0L I4	9	(France) Nicolas Marroc (France) Adrien Trouillet (France) Xavier Fort	1
CD Sport	Norma M20-FC	Honda K20A 2.0L I4	14	(France) Kevin Bole Besancon (France) Johan-Boris Scheier (Belgium) Ines Taittinger	1
CD Sport	Norma M20-FC	Honda K20A 2.0L I4	31	(France) Ludovic Cochet (France) Rémy Kirchdörffer (France) Gerard Faure	1
DB Autosport	Norma M20-FC	Honda K20A 2.0L I4	21	(France) Daniel Bassora (France) David Monclair (France) Nicolas Schatz	1
DB Autosport	Norma M20-FC	Honda K20A 2.0L I4	22	(France) Damien Delafosse (France) Quentin Vaucher (France) Thomas Accary	1
Equipe Palmyr	Norma M20-FC	Honda K20A 2.0L I4	40	(France) Phillipe Mondolot (France) David Zollinger (Switzerland) Fabien Thuner	1
Equipe Palmyr	Norma M20-FC	Honda K20A 2.0L I4	41	(France) Frederic Crouillet (France) Rodolphe Rosati	1
Equipe Palmyr	Norma M20-FC	Honda K20A 2.0L I4	42	(France) Christophe Kubryk (France) Didier Beck (France) Hugo Chevalier	1
Equipe Palmyr	Norma M20-FC	Honda K20A 2.0L I4	43	(France) Aurelien Robineau (France) Jean-Claude Ferrarin (France) Philippe Papin	1
IF Motorsport	Norma M20-FC	Honda K20A 2.0L I4	49	(United Kingdom) Allan Dallas (United Kingdom) Ian Hart (United Kingdom) Bryce Wilson	1
RC Formula	Norma M20-FC	Honda K20A 2.0L I4	66	(France) Lionel Robert (France) Antoine Robert (France) Jordan Perroy	1
Lamo Racing Car	Norma M20-FC	Honda K20A 2.0L I4	67	(France) Remy Striebig (France) Gregory Striebig (France) Stephane Raffin	1

== Race calendar and results ==
Bold indicates overall winner.

Round	Circuit	Date	Pole position	Fastest lap	CN A winner	CN T winner	CN 2 winner	CN F winner	Race
1	(Spain) Circuit de Barcelona-Catalunya	19 March	No. 2 TFT	No. 22 DB Autosport	**No. 2 TFT**	no entries	no entries	no entries	6 Hours of Barcelona
1	(Spain) Circuit de Barcelona-Catalunya	19 March	(Spain) Ander Vilariño (France) Alain Ferté (France) Philippe Illiano	(France) Damien Delafosse (France) Quentin Vaucher (France) Thomas Accary	**(Spain) Ander Vilariño** **(France) Alain Ferté** **(France) Philippe Illiano**	no entries	no entries	no entries	6 Hours of Barcelona
2	(Portugal) Algarve International Circuit	30 April							6 Hours of Portimao
3	(France) Circuit Paul Ricard	28 May							6 Hours of Paul Ricard
4	(France) Dijon-Prenois	25 June							4 Hours of Dijon
5	(Spain) Circuito del Jarama	3 September							6 Hours of Jarama
6	(France) Circuit de Nevers Magny-Cours	8 October							6 Hours of Magny-Cours
7	(Portugal) Autódromo Fernanda Pires da Silva	5 November							6 Hours of Estoril
