= Vilariño =

Vilariño may refer to:

- Ander Vilariño (born 1979), Spanish racing driver
- Andrés Vilariño (born 1951), Spanish racing driver
- Vilariño de Conso, municipality in Galicia, Spain
