= 2012 Racecar Euro Series =

Seasons
- ← 2011 2013 →

Locations of the circuits that hosted a round in the 2012 Racecar Euro Series season

The 2012 Racecar Euro Series was the 4th season of Racecar Euro Series season, and the first EuroNASCAR season under NASCAR sanctioning. The season began on April 8 with the Nogaro 200 at Circuit Paul Armagnac and ended on 14 October with the Le Mans Finals at Bugatti Circuit after five championship rounds and a non-championship round at Tours Speedway. NASCAR's standard rules, such as beneficiary rule and green-white-checker finish, were adopted by the series starting from this season.

TFT Racing driver Ander Vilariño was crowned as the first Driver's Champion in the NASCAR years after scoring six race wins during the season, edging Romain Thievin by 16 points in the final standings. Thievin did not win a race, but managed to score a podium in nine championship races. Fellow Spaniard Javier Villa was third, 64 points adrift from Vilariño. Villa took one victory at Brands Hatch, his only win in EuroNASCAR. Romain Iannetta and Gaël Castelli were the other winners in the championship rounds while Ben Kennedy and 2011 champion Éric Hélary took one win each in the Tours non-championship round. French driver Carole Perrin scored a third place finish in the fifth race at Spa-Francorchamps, making her the only female driver to finish on the podium in EuroNASCAR's top division as of the 2023 season.

In the Open division, Simon Escallier became the first champion of the present-day EuroNASCAR 2 division. Escallier swept the races at Circuit Ricardo Tormo on his way to championship victory, 44 points ahead of Alain Grand. Six other drivers scored victories in 2012, most of them were taken by part-time competitors. Outside of Escallier, Vincent Gonneau was the only other full-time driver to win a race. Martin van Hove and Olivier Porta took two race wins while Adriano Medeiros, Loic Deman and Marc Duez secured one victory each.

== Schedule ==
With the exception of the non-championship round at Tours Speedway, all races in the 2012 season were held as support races for another championship.

Round		Race title	Track	Date	Supporting
1	R1	Nogaro 200	(France) Circuit Paul Armagnac, Nogaro	April 8	FIA GT1 World Championship
1	R2	Nogaro 200	(France) Circuit Paul Armagnac, Nogaro	April 9	FIA GT1 World Championship
2	R3	Brands Hatch 200	(United Kingdom) Brands Hatch, Swanley	May 19	Deutsche Tourenwagen Masters
2	R4	Brands Hatch 200	(United Kingdom) Brands Hatch, Swanley	May 20	Deutsche Tourenwagen Masters
3	R5	Spa 200	(Belgium) Circuit de Spa-Francorchamps, Spa	June 9	Belgian Touring Car Series
3	R6	Spa 200	(Belgium) Circuit de Spa-Francorchamps, Spa	June 10	Belgian Touring Car Series
NC	NC1	Michelin / Tours Evenements 100	(France) Tours Speedway, Tours	July 7	None
NC	NC2	Michelin / Tours Evenements 100	(France) Tours Speedway, Tours	July 8	None
4	R7	Valencia Semifinals	(Spain) Circuito Ricardo Tormo, Cheste	September 29	Deutsche Tourenwagen Masters
4	R8	Valencia Semifinals	(Spain) Circuito Ricardo Tormo, Cheste	September 30	Deutsche Tourenwagen Masters
5	R9	Le Mans Finals	(France) Circuit Bugatti, Le Mans	October 13	European Truck Racing Championship
5	R10	Le Mans Finals	(France) Circuit Bugatti, Le Mans	October 14	European Truck Racing Championship

== Results ==
=== Elite ===
Round		Race	Pole position	Fastest lap	Most laps led	Winning driver	Winning team	Winning manufacturer
1	R1	(France) Nogaro 200	(Spain) Ander Vilariño	(Spain) Javier Villa	(France) Romain Thievin	(Spain) Ander Vilariño	TFT Racing	Chevrolet
1	R2	(France) Nogaro 200	(Spain) Javier Villa	(Spain) Ander Vilariño	(Spain) Ander Vilariño	(Spain) Ander Vilariño	TFT Racing	Chevrolet
2	R3	(United Kingdom) Brands Hatch 200	(France) Romain Thievin	(Spain) Ander Vilariño	(Spain) Ander Vilariño	(Spain) Ander Vilariño	TFT Racing	Chevrolet
2	R4	(United Kingdom) Brands Hatch 200	(Spain) Ander Vilariño	(Spain) Javier Villa	(Spain) Ander Vilariño	(Spain) Javier Villa	TFT Racing	Chevrolet
3	R5	(Belgium) Spa 200	(Spain) Ander Vilariño	(Spain) Ander Vilariño	(Spain) Ander Vilariño	(Spain) Ander Vilariño	TFT Racing	Chevrolet
3	R6	(Belgium) Spa 200	(Spain) Ander Vilariño	(Spain) Ander Vilariño	(France) Romain Iannetta	(France) Romain Iannetta	Orhes Competition	Dodge
NC	NC1	(France) Michelin / Tours Evenements 100	(France) Romain Fournillier	(France) Carole Perrin	Unknown	(United States) Ben Kennedy	TFT Racing	Chevrolet
NC	NC2	(France) Michelin / Tours Evenements 100	(France) Carole Perrin	(Spain) Javier Villa	Unknown	(France) Éric Hélary	Still Racing	Chevrolet
4	R7	(Spain) Valencia SemiFinals	(Spain) Javier Villa	(Spain) Javier Villa	(Spain) Ander Vilariño	(Spain) Ander Vilariño	TFT Racing	Chevrolet
4	R8	(Spain) Valencia SemiFinals	(Spain) Javier Villa	(Spain) Ander Vilariño	(Spain) Ander Vilariño	(Spain) Ander Vilariño	TFT Racing	Chevrolet
5	R9	(France) Le Mans Finals	(Spain) Ander Vilariño	(France) Gaël Castelli	Unknown	(France) Gaël Castelli	Rapido Racing	Ford
5	R10	(France) Le Mans Finals	(France) Gaël Castelli	(France) Gaël Castelli	Unknown	(France) Gaël Castelli	Rapido Racing	Ford

=== Open ===
Round		Race	Pole position	Fastest lap	Most laps led	Winning driver	Winning team	Winning manufacturer
1	R1	(France) Nogaro 200	(France) Eric Quintal	(France) Vincent Gonneau	(France) Eric Quintal	(Belgium) Martin van Hove	TFT Racing	Dodge
1	R2	(France) Nogaro 200	(France) Simon Escallier	(France) Eric Quintal	(France) Vincent Gonneau	(Belgium) Martin van Hove (Note: Vincent Gonneau originally won the race, but he received a post-race penalty for causing an avoidable collision.)	TFT Racing	Dodge
2	R3	(United Kingdom) Brands Hatch 200	(France) Philippe Marie	(Brazil) Adriano Medeiros	Unknown	(France) Vincent Gonneau	Gonneau Racing	Chevrolet
2	R4	(United Kingdom) Brands Hatch 200	(Belgium) Martin van Hove	(Belgium) Martin van Hove	Unknown	(Brazil) Adriano Medeiros	Autosport 42	Chevrolet
3	R5	(Belgium) Spa 200	(Belgium) Loic Deman	(Belgium) Loic Deman	(Belgium) Loic Deman	(Belgium) Loic Deman	Rapido Racing	Ford
3	R6	(Belgium) Spa 200	(France) Gerald Cormon	Unknown	(Belgium) Marc Duez	(Belgium) Marc Duez	TFT Racing	Chevrolet
NC	NC1	(France) Michelin / Tours Evenements 100	Unknown	Unknown	Unknown	(France) Sebastien Baron	Rapido Racing	Ford
NC	NC2	(France) Michelin / Tours Evenements 100	(France) Vincent Gonneau	Unknown	(France) Vincent Gonneau	(France) Vincent Gonneau	Gonneau Racing	Chevrolet
4	R7	(Spain) Valencia SemiFinals	(France) Simon Escallier	(Australia) Josh Burdon	(France) Simon Escallier	(France) Simon Escallier	Scorpus Racing	Dodge
4	R8	(Spain) Valencia SemiFinals	(France) Eric Quintal	(France) Eric Quintal	Unknown	(France) Simon Escallier	Scorpus Racing	Dodge
5	R9	(France) Le Mans Finals	(France) Olivier Porta	(France) Olivier Porta	Unknown	(France) Olivier Porta	TFT Racing	Chevrolet
5	R10	(France) Le Mans Finals	(France) Donald Reignoux	(Australia) Josh Burdon	Unknown	(France) Olivier Porta	TFT Racing	Chevrolet

== Standings ==
=== Elite ===
(key) Bold - Pole position awarded by time. Italics - Pole position set by final practice results or rainout. * – Most laps led.

Rank	Driver	NOG1	NOG2	BRH1	BRH2	SPA1	SPA2	TOU1	TOU2	VAL1	VAL2	LMS1	LMS2	Points
1	Ander Vilariño	**1**	1	1	**2**	**1**	**2**			1	1	**7**	10	667
2	Romain Thievin	2	3	**2**	3	2	10			3	2	2	2	651
3	Javier Villa **(J)**	4	**2**	3	1	19	3			**2**	**3**	6	6	603
4	Antoine Lioen	13	7	6	4	5	11			4	5	15	9	567
5	Romain Iannetta	5	16	5	9	20	1			10	4	3	3	566

== See also ==
- 2012 NASCAR Sprint Cup Series
- 2012 NASCAR Nationwide Series
- 2012 NASCAR Camping World Truck Series
- 2012 NASCAR K&N Pro Series East
- 2012 ARCA Racing Series
- 2012 NASCAR Whelen Modified Tour
- 2012 NASCAR Whelen Southern Modified Tour
- 2012 NASCAR Canadian Tire Series
- 2012 NASCAR Toyota Series
- 2012 NASCAR Stock V6 Series
- 2012 ARCA Racing Series
