= Vincent Capillaire =

French racing driver (born 1976)

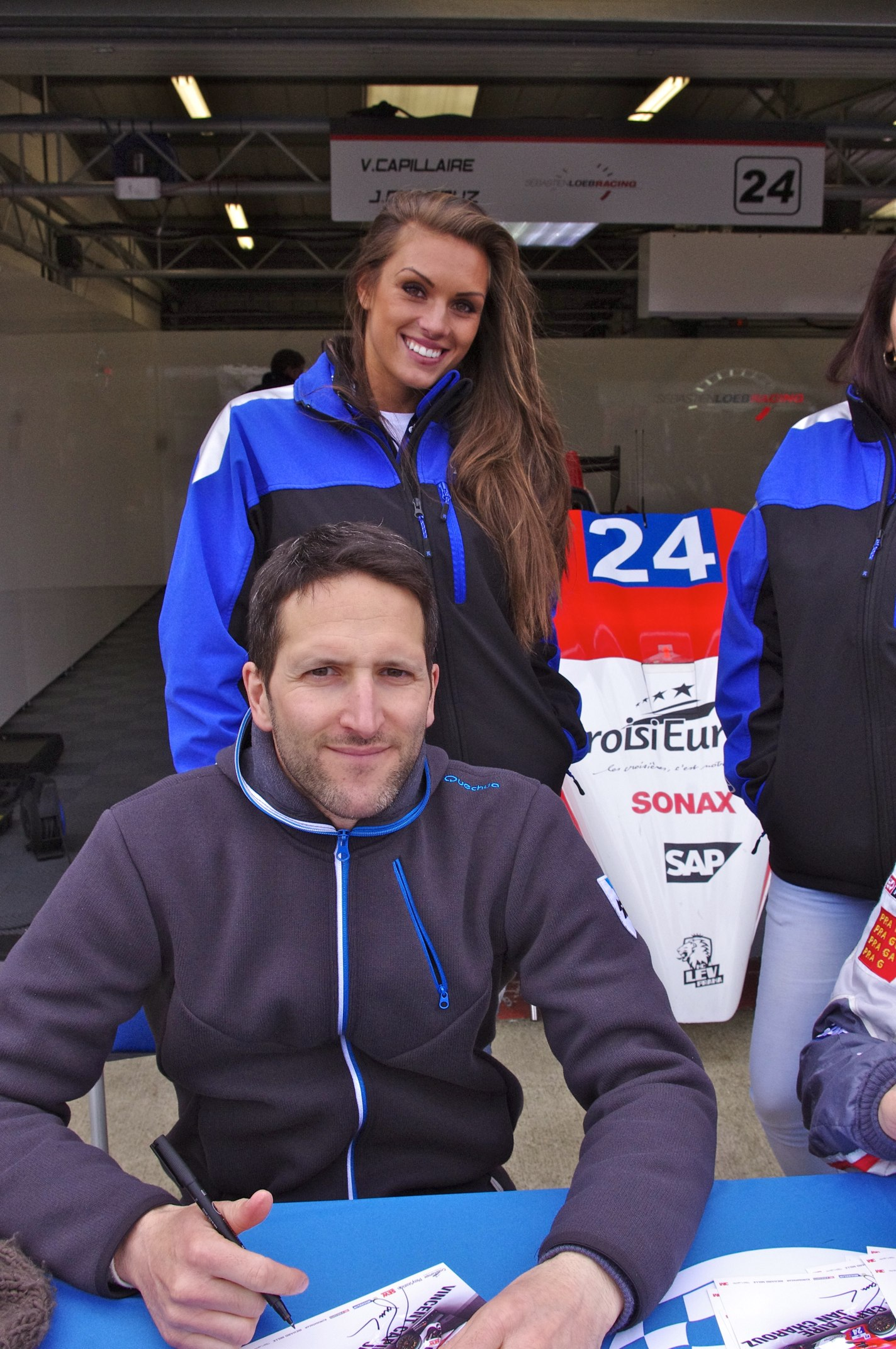
- Capillaire in 2014
- Nationality: (France) French
- Born: Vincent Noël Renaud Capillaire; 4 February 1976 (age 50) Yvré-l'Évêque, France
- Categorisation: FIA Silver (until 2026); FIA Bronze (2027–)

Championship titles
- 2019 2014: Ultimate Cup Series Prototype Challenge – LMP3; V de V Challenge Endurance Proto

Vincent Noël Renaud Capillaire (born 4 February 1976) is a French racing driver set to compete in the European Endurance Prototype Cup for Graff Racing.

== Career ==
Capillaire began his car racing career in 1997, racing in Formula Renault Campus France, before racing in the main series the following year. After a decade on the sidelines, Capillaire returned to racing in 2008, competing in the first two rounds of Formula Asia 2.0 for Asia Racing Team. Capillaire then made a one-off appearance in the Formula Le Mans Cup the following year, before joining Hope Polevision Racing to race in the FLM class of the 2010 Le Mans Series. Taking part in the first three races, Capillaire scored a best result of second at Le Castellet.

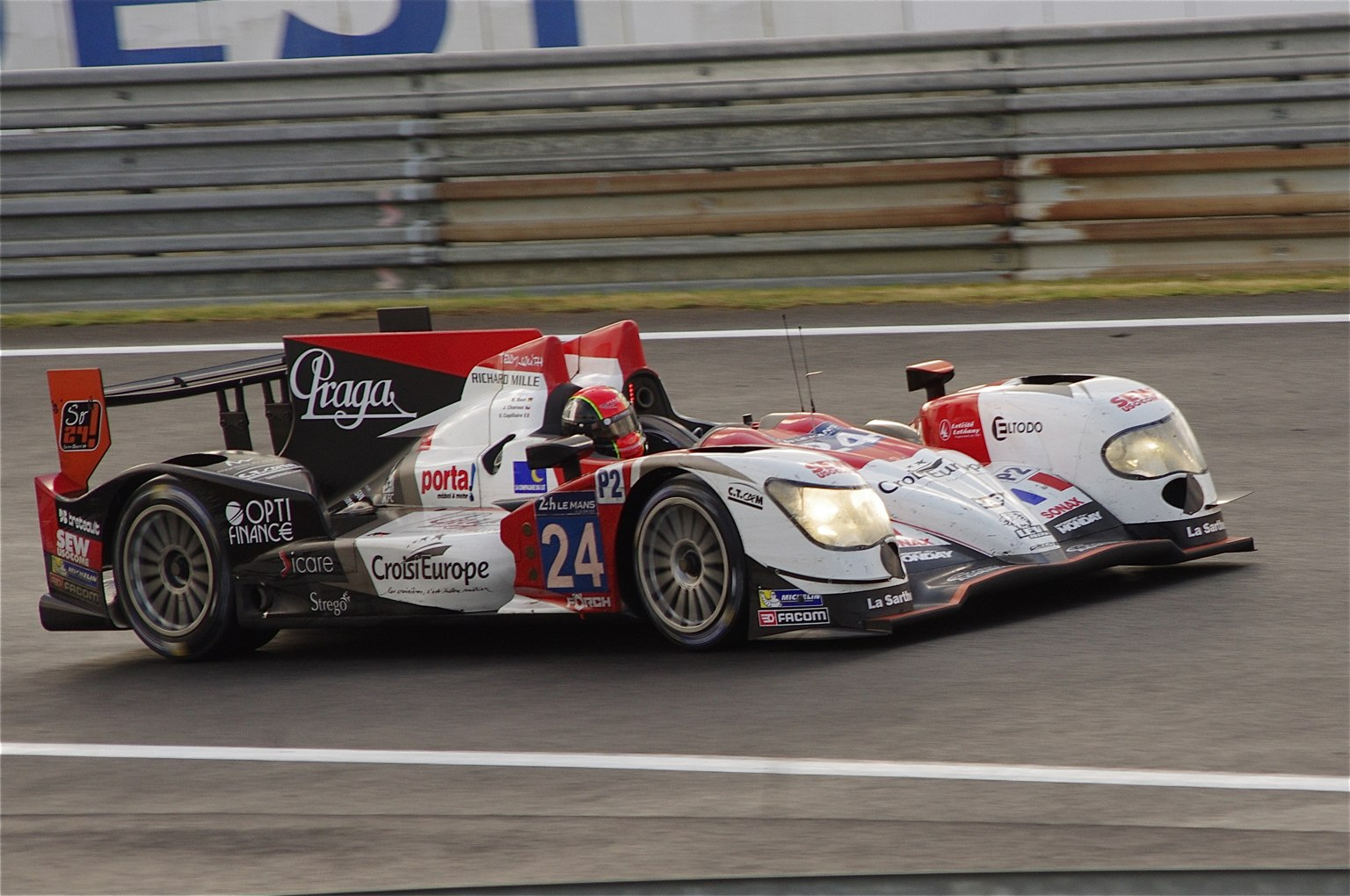
Capillaire on his Le Mans debut with Sébastien Loeb Racing's LMP2 in 2014.

A season in the Racecar Euro Series with Le Duigou Racing then ensued, before returning to racing in 2013 in the V de V Challenge Endurance Series, in which he finished runner-up in points driving for TFT Racing. Returning to the series the following year, Capillaire took four wins and one other podium to secure the Proto title with a race to spare. During 2014, Capillaire also raced for Sébastien Loeb Racing in all but one race of the European Le Mans Series, as well as the 24 Hours of Le Mans. In the former, Capillaire won at Estoril and finished on the podium at Imola to end the season fourth in the LMP2 standings.

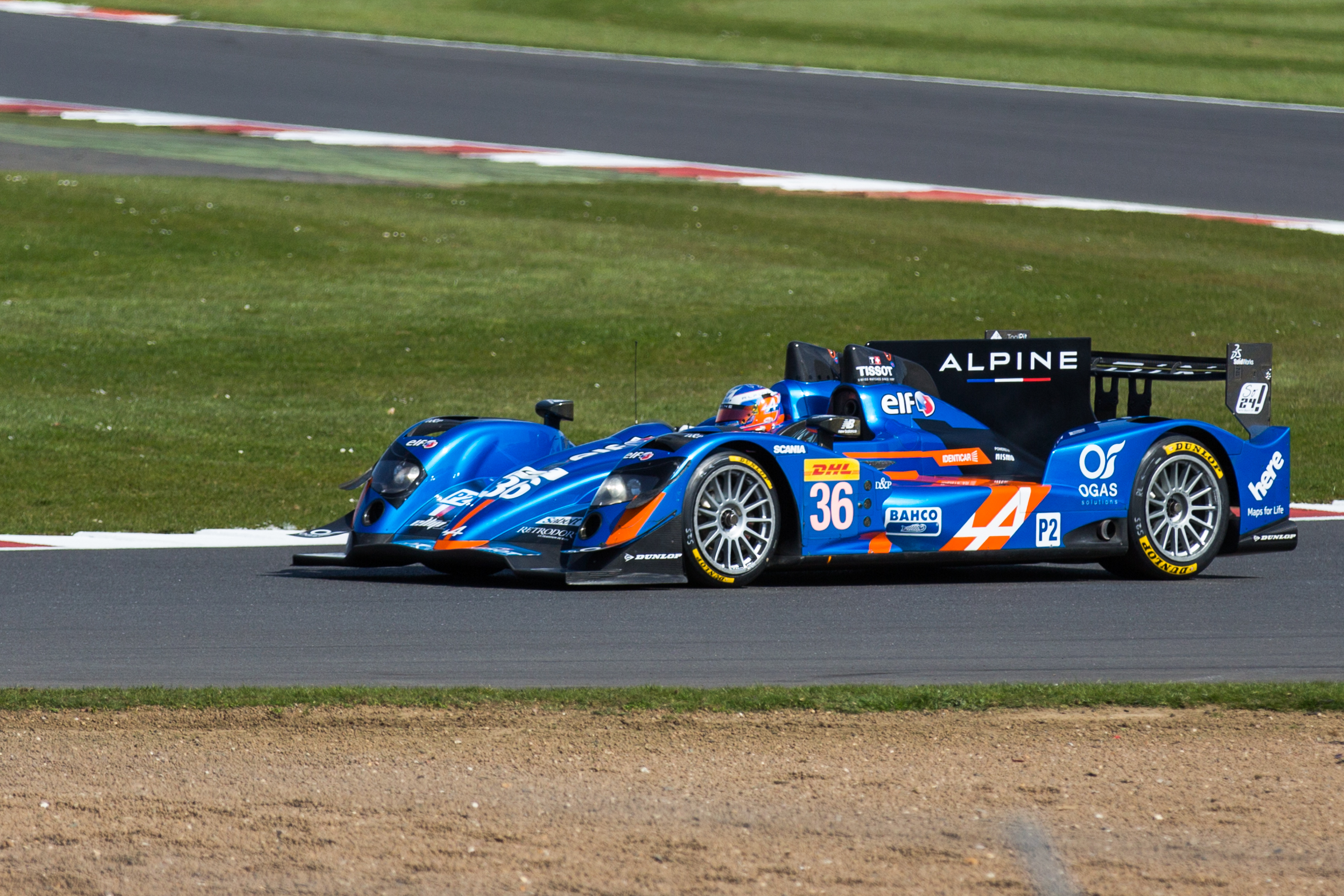
Capillaire driving for Signatech Alpine at Silverstone in 2015.

In 2015, Capillaire remained in LMP2 competition as he joined Signatech Alpine to race in the FIA World Endurance Championship. In his only season in the series, Capillaire raced in the first six races of the year, taking a best result of second at Fuji, before being replaced by Tom Dillmann for the final two races. The following year, Capillaire returned to the European Le Mans Series with SO24! By Lombard Racing to continue racing in LMP2 competition. After finishing on the podium at Silverstone and racing in the 24 Hours of Le Mans, the team filed for bankruptcy and withdrew from the rest of the ELMS season ahead of the 4 Hours of Red Bull Ring.

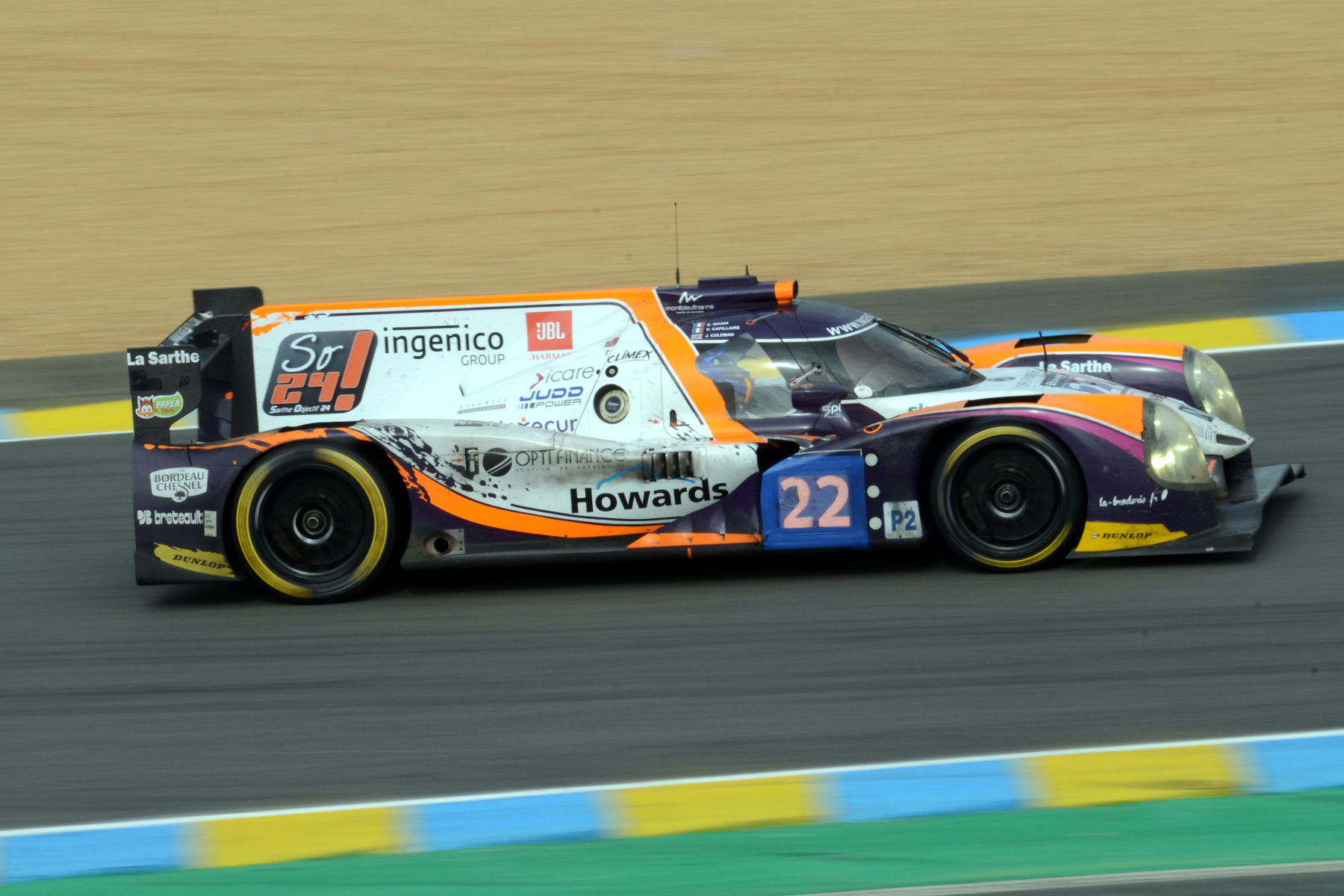
Capillaire's Lombard Racing Ligier JS P2 at the 2016 24 Hours of Le Mans.

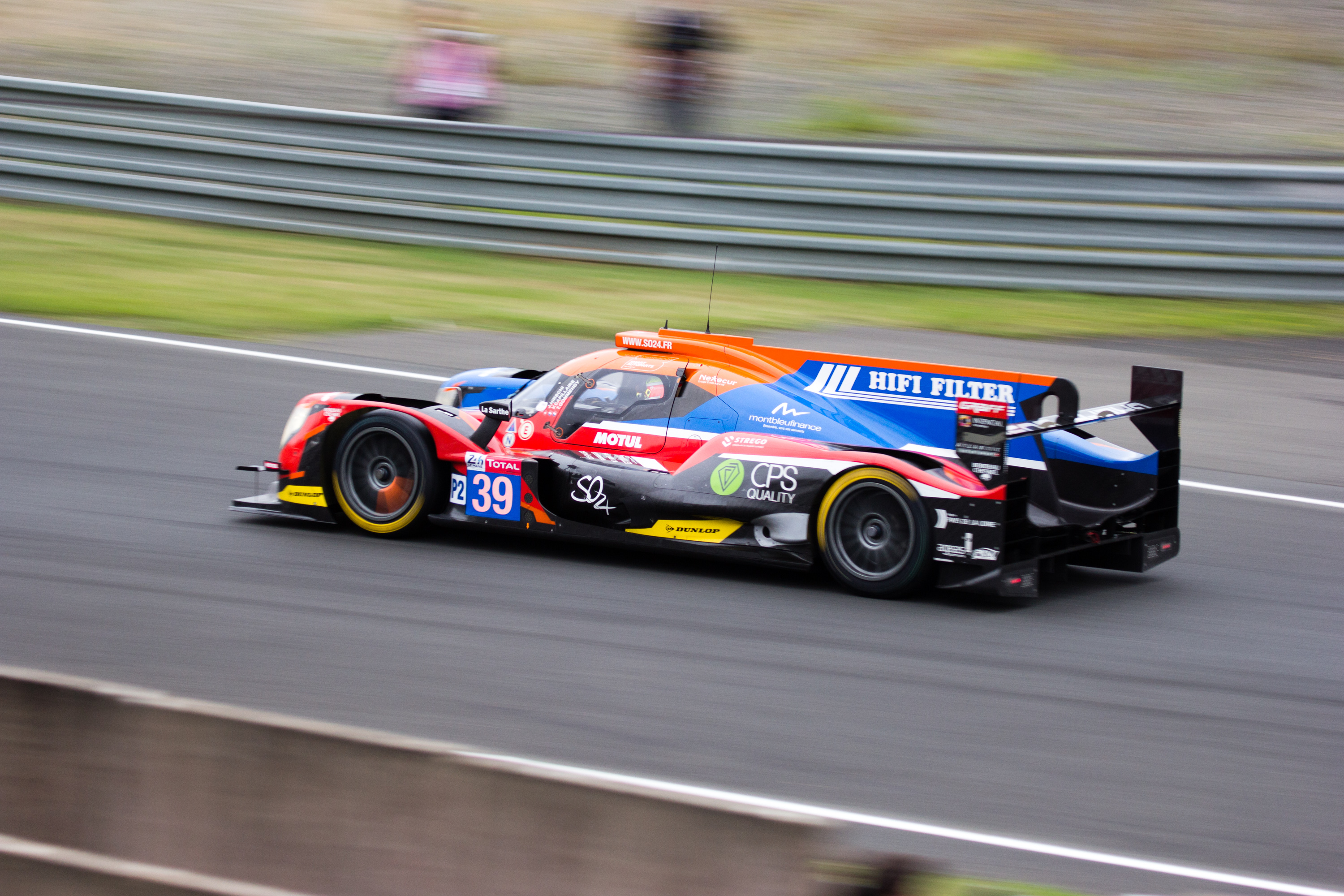
Capillaire secured his only Le Mans podium to date in 2018 for Graff-SO24.

Returning to TFT Racing for 2017, Capillaire mainly raced in the V de V Proto Endurance Challenge, taking three podiums and finishing third in the CN A standings. During 2017, Capillaire also raced at the 2017 24 Hours of Le Mans for Algarve Pro Racing in LMP2. In which he indirectly caused the retirement of the No.7 Toyota, after giving Kamui Kobayashi the thumbs-up signal at the pit lane exit and causing him to run a red light and ultimately burn his clutch. The following year, Capillaire only raced at the 24 Hours of Le Mans for Graff-SO24, in which he finished second in LMP2.

Capillaire then primarily competed in the Ultimate Cup Series Prototype Challenge for Wimmer Werk Motorsport in 2019, winning four races en route to the LMP3 title at season's end. During 2019, Capillaire also raced for Graff in the 24 Hours of Le Mans in LMP2, in which teammate Tristan Gommendy qualified on class pole but had his laps deleted after Capillaire failed to stop for a weight check at the scrutineering light during the final part of qualifying. Continuing with the French team for the following two seasons, Capillaire raced in the 24 Hours of Le Mans in LMP2 in both years, as well as racing in the European Le Mans Series in LMP3 in 2020 and LMP2 Pro-Am in 2021. Following that, Capillaire competed in select rounds of the European Endurance Prototype Cup across the following three seasons, racing in LMP3 in the first two and then making a one-off appearance in NP02 in 2025.

The following year, Capillaire returned to the series with Graff Racing.

== Racing record ==
=== Racing career summary ===
Season	Series	Team	Races	Wins	Poles	F/Laps	Podiums	Points	Position
1997	Formula Renault Campus France			1	1				
1998	Formula Renault France		2	0	0	0	0	0	NC
2008	Formula Asia 2.0	Asia Racing Team	4	0	0	0	0	4	14th
2009	Formula Le Mans Cup	DAMS	1	0	0	1	0	10	23rd
2010	Le Mans Series – FLM	Hope Polevision Racing	3	0	0	0	1	27	14th
2010	Racecar Euro Series – Elite	Le Duigou Racing	2	0	0	0	0	536	21st
2010	V de V Challenge Endurance Moderne – Proto	Extreme Limite	3	0	1	1	1	0	NC
2011	Racecar Euro Series – Elite	Le Duigou Racing	12	0	0	0	0	388	11th
2011	V de V Challenge Endurance Moderne – Proto	Equipe Palmyr; CD Sport	2	0	0	0	0	4.5	45th
2013	V de V Challenge Endurance Moderne – Scratch	TFT	7	0	1	1	6	161	**2nd**
2013	V de V Michelin Endurance Series – GT	TFT	1	0	0	0	1	0	NC
2014	V de V Challenge Endurance Moderne – Scratch	TFT	7	4	2	0	5	202	**1st**
2014	European Le Mans Series – LMP2	Sébastien Loeb Racing	4	1	0	0	2	57	4th
2014	24 Hours of Le Mans – LMP2	Sébastien Loeb Racing	1	0	0	0	0	—N/a	4th
2015	FIA World Endurance Championship – LMP2	Signatech Alpine	6	0	0	0	1	48	12th
2015	24 Hours of Le Mans – LMP2	Signatech Alpine	1	0	0	0	0	—N/a	DNF
2015	V de V Challenge Endurance Moderne – Scratch	TFT	4	1	1	1	3	39	21st
2015	Renault Sport Trophy – Elite	Monlau Competición	1	0	0	0	0	0	NC†
2015	Renault Sport Trophy – Endurance Trophy	Monlau Competición	1	0	0	0	0	0	NC†
2016	European Le Mans Series – LMP2	SO24! By Lombard Racing	2	0	0	0	1	15.5	22nd
2016	24 Hours of Le Mans – LMP2	SO24! By Lombard Racing	1	0	0	0	0	—N/a	14th
2016	V de V Challenge Endurance Moderne – Proto	TFT	5	0	1	1	1	140.5	7th
2017	V de V Proto Endurance Challenge	TFT	7	0	0	0	3		**3rd**
2017	24 Hours of Le Mans – LMP2	Algarve Pro Racing	1	0	0	0	0	—N/a	15th
2018	24 Hours of Le Mans – LMP2	Graff-SO24	1	0	0	0	1	—N/a	**2nd**
2019	Ultimate Cup Series Prototype Challenge – LMP3	Wimmer Werk Motorsport	6	4	2	1	5	192	**1st**
2019	GT & Prototype Challenge – LMP3	T2 Racing	2	0	0	2	1	33	8th
2019	24 Hours of Le Mans – LMP2	Graff	1	0	0	0	0	—N/a	9th
2020	European Le Mans Series – LMP3	Graff	5	0	0	0	0	42	7th
2020	24 Hours of Le Mans – LMP2	SO24-HAS by Graff	1	0	0	0	0	—N/a	DNF
2021	European Le Mans Series – LMP2 Pro-Am	Graff Racing	5	0	0	0	0	46	9th
2021	24 Hours of Le Mans – LMP2 Pro-Am	SO24-DIROB by Graff	1	0	0	0	0	—N/a	5th
2023	Endurance Prototype Challenge – LMP3	Graff Racing	2	0	0	0	1	36	6th
2023	Endurance Prototype Challenge – LMP3	Reiter Engineering	1	0	0	0	0	36	6th
2024	European Endurance Prototype Cup – LMP3	Reiter Engineering	5	0	0	0	0	28	13th
2025	European Endurance Prototype Cup	Cogemo Racing	1	0	0	0	0	8	35th
2026	European Endurance Prototype Cup	Graff Racing							

^{†} As Capillaire was a guest driver, he was ineligible for championship points.

=== Complete European Le Mans Series results ===
Year	Entrant	Class	Chassis	Engine	1	2	3	4	5	6	Rank	Points
2010	Hope Polevision Racing	FLM	Oreca FLM09	General Motors LS3 6.3 L V8	LEC; 2	**SPA**; Ret	ALG; Ret	HUN	SIL		14th	27
2014	Sébastien Loeb Racing	LMP2	Oreca 03	Nissan VK45DE 4.5 L V8	SIL; 7	IMO; 2	RED	LEC; 6	EST; 1		4th	57
2016	SO24! By Lombard Racing	LMP2	Ligier JS P2	Nissan VK45DE 4.5 L V8	SIL; 3	IMO; 11	RBR	LEC	SPA	EST	22nd	15.5
2020	Graff	LMP3	Ligier JS P320	Nissan VK56DE 5.6L V8	LEC; 5	SPA; 4	LEC; 8	MNZ; 5	ALG; 7		7th	42
2021	Graff Racing	LMP2	Oreca 07	Gibson GK428 4.2 L V8	CAT; 14	RBR; 13	LEC; 14	MNZ; 16	SPA	ALG; 12	29th	2.5
2021	Graff Racing	Pro-Am Cup	Oreca 07	Gibson GK428 4.2 L V8	5	7	5	8		4	9th	46

=== Complete 24 Hours of Le Mans results ===
Year	Team	Co-Drivers	Car	Class	Laps	Pos.	Class Pos.
2014	(France) Sébastien Loeb Racing	(Germany) René Rast (Czech Republic) Jan Charouz	Oreca 03R-Nissan	LMP2	354	8th	4th
2015	(France) Signatech-Alpine	(France) Nelson Panciatici (France) Paul-Loup Chatin	Alpine A450b-Nissan	LMP2	110	DNF	DNF
2016	(France) SO24! by Lombard Racing	(France) Erik Maris (United Kingdom) Jonathan Coleman	Oreca 03R-Nissan	LMP2	328	32nd	14th
2017	(Portugal) Algarve Pro Racing	(United States) Mark Patterson (United States) Matt McMurry	Ligier JS P217-Gibson	LMP2	330	32nd	15th
2018	(France) Graff-SO24	(France) Tristan Gommendy (Switzerland) Jonathan Hirschi	Oreca 07-Gibson	LMP2	366	6th	**2nd**
2019	(France) Graff	(France) Tristan Gommendy (Switzerland) Jonathan Hirschi	Oreca 07-Gibson	LMP2	362	14th	9th
2020	(France) SO24-HAS By Graff	(France) Charles Milesi (Australia) James Allen	Oreca 07-Gibson	LMP2	357	DNF	DNF
2021	(France) SO24-DIROB by Graff	(France) Arnold Robin (France) Maxime Robin	Oreca 07-Gibson	LMP2	352	19th	14th
2021	(France) SO24-DIROB by Graff	(France) Arnold Robin (France) Maxime Robin	Oreca 07-Gibson	LMP2 Pro-Am	352	19th	5th

=== Complete FIA World Endurance Championship results ===
(key) (Races in bold indicate pole position; races in italics indicate fastest lap)

Year	Entrant	Class	Chassis	Engine	1	2	3	4	5	6	7	8	Rank	Points
2015	Signatech Alpine	LMP2	Alpine A450b	Nissan VK45DE 4.5 L V8	SIL; Ret	SPA; 5	LMS; Ret	NÜR; 5	COA; 5	FUJ; 2	SHA	BHR	12th	48
