= Jonathan Hirschi =

Swiss racing and rally driver

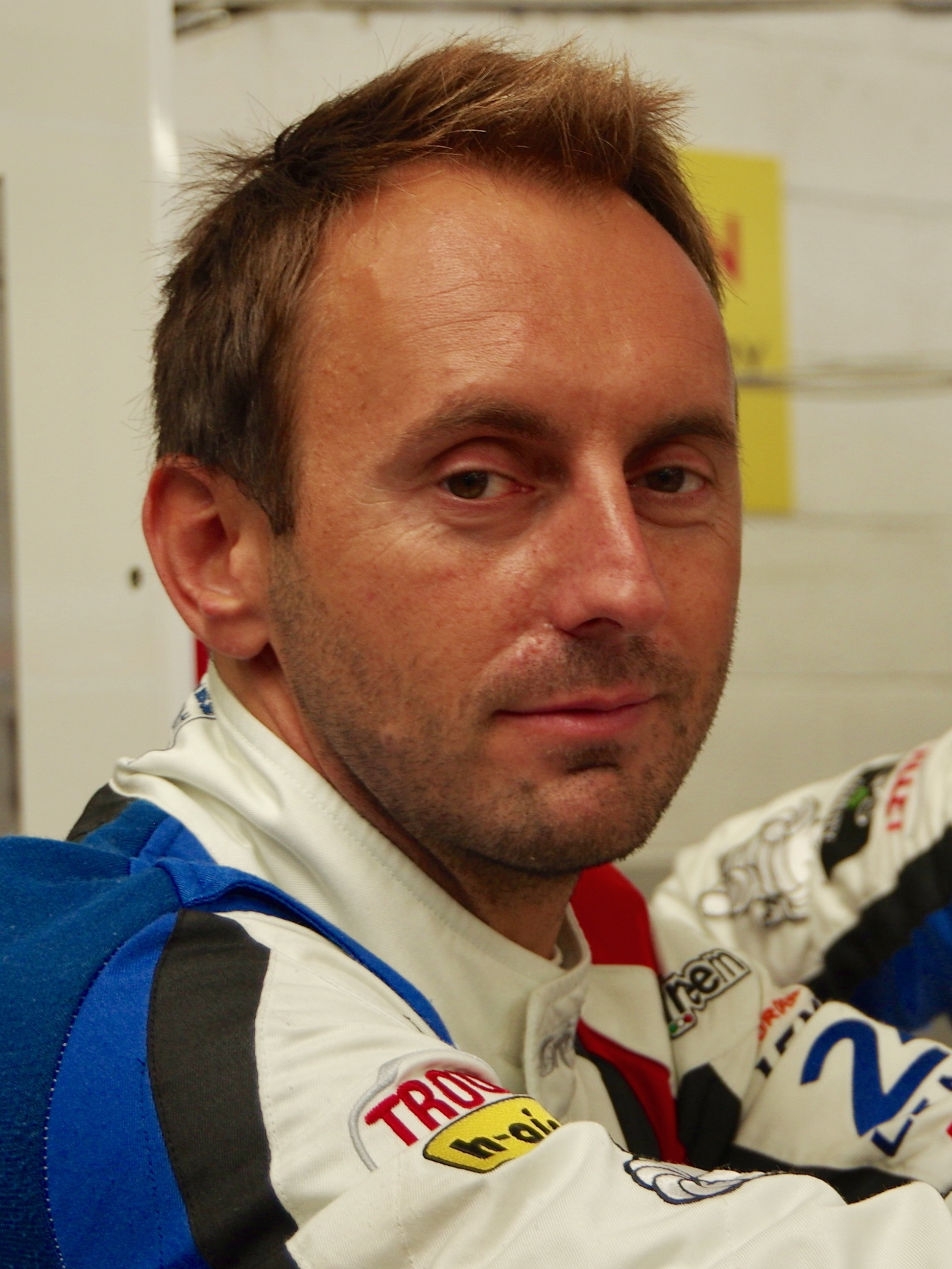
- Hirschi in 2019
- Nationality: Swiss
- Born: 2 February 1986 (age 40) St. Imier, Switzerland
- Categorisation: FIA Gold (until 2012, 2014–2025); FIA Silver (2013, 2026–)

World Rally Championship record
- Years active: 2012–present
- Rallies: 4
- Championships: 0
- Rally wins: 0
- Podiums: 0
- Stage wins: 0
- Total points: 0
- First rally: 2012 Rallye de France

Jonathan Hirschi (born 2 February 1986 in St. Imier, Switzerland) is a Swiss racing and rally driver. He last competed in the European Le Mans Series with Duqueine Engineering.

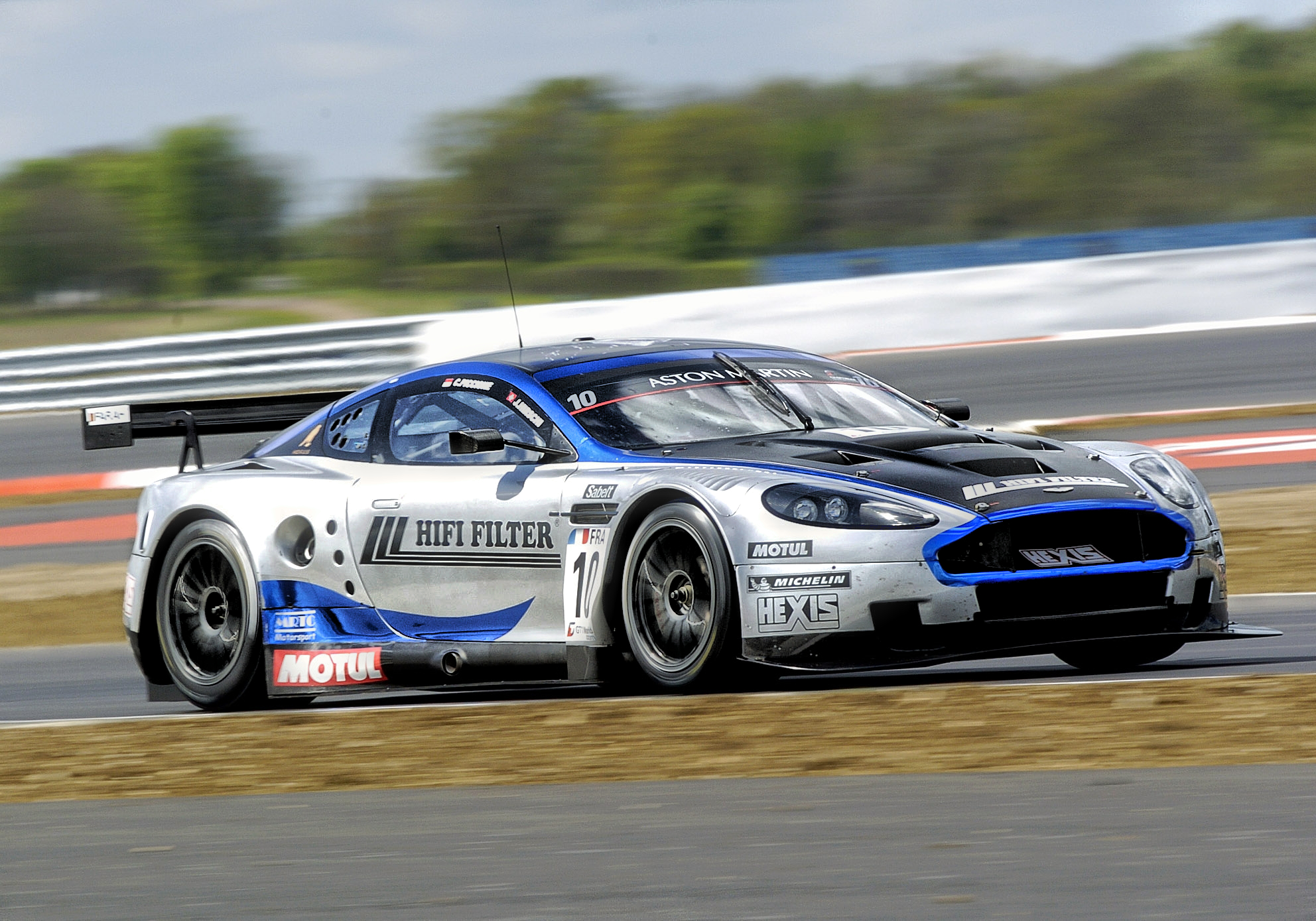
Hirschi racing for Aston Martin in the 2010 FIA GT1 World Championship.

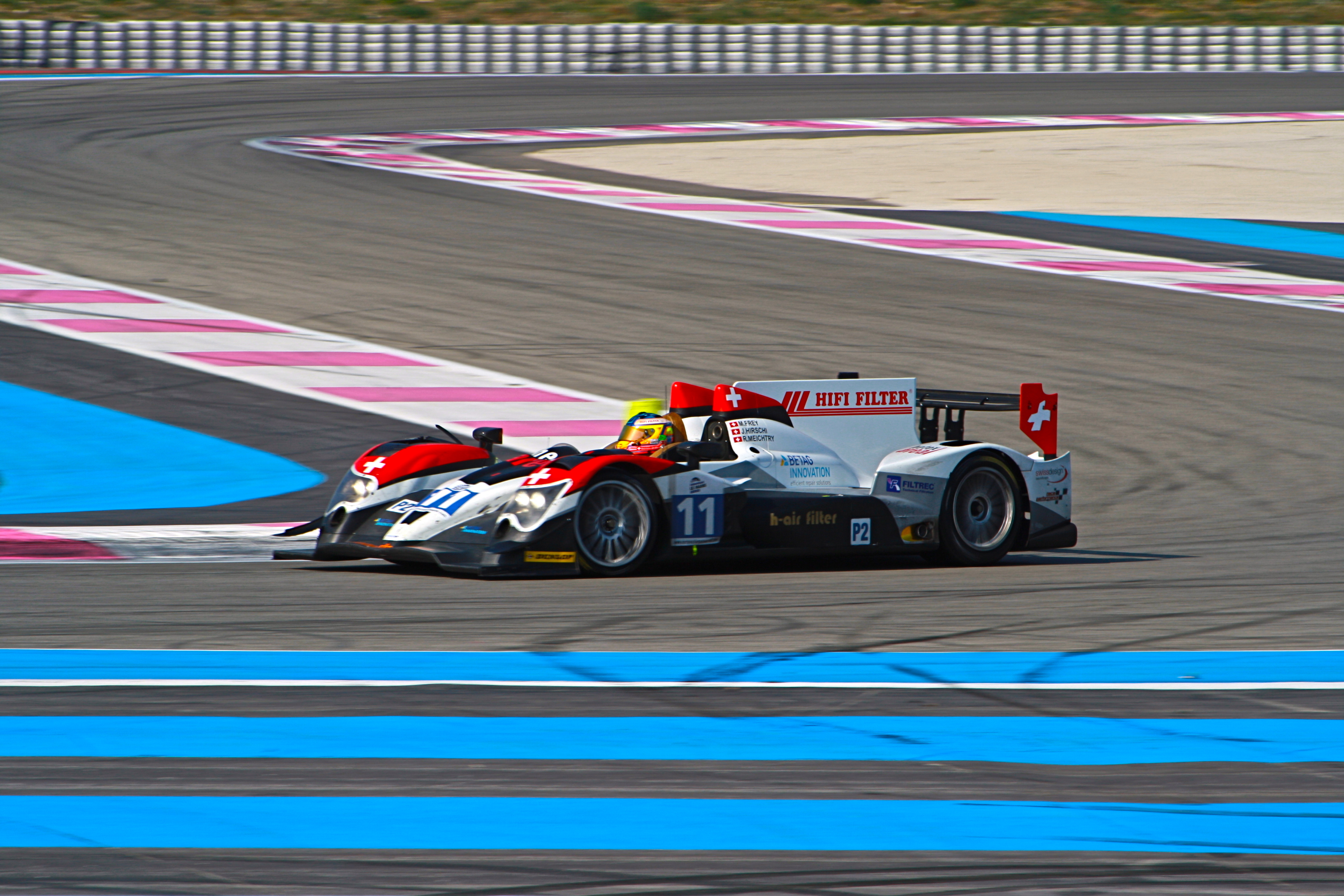
Hirschi driving for Race Performance in 2012, his first season in LMP2.

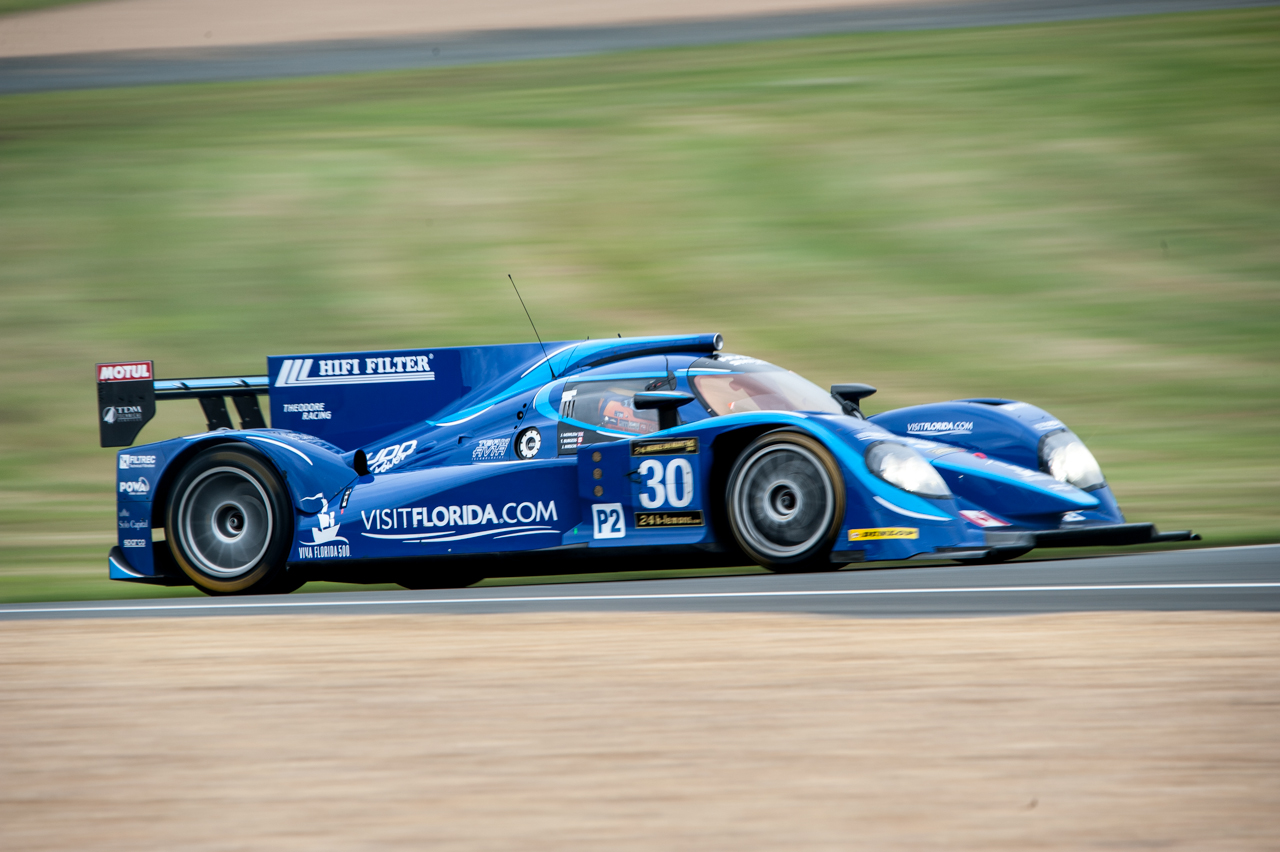
Hirschi's HVM Status GP Lola at the 2013 24 Hours of Le Mans.

== Racing record ==
=== Complete Eurocup Mégane Trophy results ===
(key) (Races in bold indicate pole position) (Races in italics indicate fastest lap)

Year	Entrant	1	2	3	4	5	6	7	8	9	10	11	12	13	14	Rank	Points
2006	Hirschi Racing Team	ZOL; 1	ZOL; 2	IST; 1	IST; 2	MIS; 1	MIS; 2	NÜR; 1	NÜR; 2	DON; 1 DSQ	DON; 2 EX	LMS; 1	LMS; 2	CAT; 1; 6	CAT; 2; 11	NC†	0
2008	Tech 1 Racing	SPA; 1; 3	SPA; 2; 4	SIL; 1; 6	SIL; 2; 6	HUN; 1 Ret	HUN; 2; 14	NÜR; 1; 4	NÜR; 2; 4	LMS; 1; 7	LMS; 2 Ret	EST; 1; 5	EST; 2; 7	CAT; 1; 3	CAT; 2; 5	6th	75
2009	TDS Racing	CAT; 1; 1	CAT; 2; 2	**SPA**; **1**; 1	**SPA**; **2**; 1	HUN; 1; 3	HUN; 2 DSQ	SIL; 1; 4	SIL; 2; 6	LMS; 1; 1	LMS; 2; 2	NÜR; 1 Ret	NÜR; 2; 3	ALC; 1; 4	ALC; 2; 4	2nd	136

^{†} As Hirschi was a guest driver, he was ineligible for points.

=== Complete Eurocup Formula Renault 2.0 results ===
(key) (Races in bold indicate pole position; races in italics indicate fastest lap)

Year	Entrant	1	2	3	4	5	6	7	8	9	10	11	12	13	14	DC	Points
2007	Boutsen Energy Racing	ZOL; 1; 15	ZOL; 2; 18	NÜR; 1; 20	NÜR; 2; 15	HUN; 1	HUN; 2	DON; 1	DON; 2	MAG; 1	MAG; 2	EST; 1	EST; 2	CAT; 1	CAT; 2	32nd	0

=== 24 Hours of Le Mans results ===
Year	Team	Co-Drivers	Car	Class	Laps	Pos.	Class Pos.
2010	(Switzerland) Matech Competition	(Germany) Thomas Mutsch (Switzerland) Romain Grosjean	Ford GT1	GT1	171	DNF	DNF
2011	(Austria) Lotus Jetalliance	(United Kingdom) Johnny Mowlem (United Kingdom) James Rossiter	Lotus Evora GTE	GTE; Pro	295	22nd	7th
2012	(Switzerland) Race Performance	(Switzerland) Michel Frey (Switzerland) Ralph Meichtry	Oreca 03-Judd	LMP2	320	26th	11th
2013	(Canada) HVM Status GP	(United Kingdom) Johnny Mowlem (Canada) Tony Burgess	Lola B12/80-Judd	LMP2	153	DNF	DNF
2017	(China) CEFC Manor TRS Racing	(Thailand) Tor Graves (France) Jean-Éric Vergne	Oreca 07-Gibson	LMP2	360	7th	6th
2018	(France) Graff-SO24	(France) Vincent Capillaire (France) Tristan Gommendy	Oreca 07-Gibson	LMP2	366	6th	**2nd**
2019	(France) Graff	(France) Vincent Capillaire (France) Tristan Gommendy	Oreca 07-Gibson	LMP2	362	14th	9th
2020	(France) Duqueine Team	(Russia) Konstantin Tereshchenko (France) Tristan Gommendy	Oreca 07-Gibson	LMP2	100	DNF	DNF
