= Ander Vilariño =

Spanish racing driver

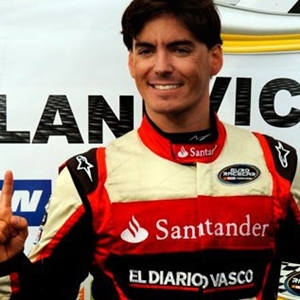
- Nationality: Spanish
- Full name: Ander Vilariño Facal
- Born: 6 November 1979 (age 47) Hondarribia, Basque Country, Spain
- Relatives: Andrés Vilariño (father)

NASCAR Whelen Euro Series career
- Debut season: 2012
- Current team: Racing Engineering
- Car number: 22
- Former teams: DF1 Racing
- Starts: 59
- Championships: 3 (2012, 2013, 2015)
- Wins: 22
- Podiums: 35
- Poles: 24
- Fastest laps: 24
- Best finish: 1st in 2012, 2013, 2015
- Finished last season: 1st in 2015

Championship titles
- 2016–2017 2012–13, 2015 2001 2000: V de V Proto Endurance Challenge; EuroNASCAR PRO; Spanish Formula Three; Formula Super Toyota Spain

Ander Vilariño Facal (born 6 November 1979 in Hondarribia) is a Spanish auto racing driver that is currently competing in the NASCAR Whelen Euro Series, driving the No. 22 Chevrolet Camaro for DF1 Racing. Vilariño is one of the most successful drivers in NASCAR Whelen Euro Series history. He has won three titles (2012, 2013, and 2015) and has 22 race wins in his EuroNASCAR career.

Vilariño started racing in 1996 in the Formula Renault Campus after having competed in some karting championships. He is the son of former FIA European Hill Climb Champion (1989, 1990, 1991, 1992) and FIA European Hill Climb Championship Trophy Winner (2007) Andrés Vilariño.

== Racing career ==
Vilarino competed in karting since 1990 until his first race in 1996 in Formula Renault Campus. In 1997, Vilariño was competing in the French Formula Renault, but he suffered a big crash in the second race of the season at Nogaro and he had to stop the season. In 1998, he repeated the French Formula Renault. In 1999, he raced in rallies and hill climbs in Spain. In 2000, Vilariño won his first national championship, the Spanish Formula Supertoyota Championship. In 2001, he raced in the European Le Mans Series, at the 6 Hours of Estoril. In 2001, he won his second Spanish Championship, the Spanish Formula 3 Championship. Vilarino moved to World Series by Nissan in 2002 and he stayed there until the beginning the 2004, there he left Epsilon Euskadi team for differences with his direction. In World Series Nissan Ander got two wins, three pole positions and eight podiums.

Vilariño then moved into the FIA European Hill Climb Championship, there he won the FIA European Hill Cup FIA European Hill Climb Cup in 2005. In 2006 in the first race of the FIA European Hill Climb Championship in Rechberg he suffered an accident that got him out of competition for the whole year. After recovering he came back and won the 2007 FIA Hill Climb en Campeonato de Europa. After two full years in Hill Climbs, he came back to circuit racing being seventh in the European Endurance Challenge VdeV for sport prototypes in 2008. Then in 2009, he finished third but just participating in half of the championship. In 2010, Vilariño participated in three races of the VdeV European Endurance Challenge and won the Basque Rallysprint Championship.

In 2011, Vilariño made his stock car racing debut as he raced the FIA Racecar Euro Series (the predecessor of the current NASCAR Whelen Euro Series), finishing third overall in the championship after getting two wins, five podiums, three pole positions and four fastest laps in of 12 races. That same year, Vilariño raced four races on the FIA Speed Euroseries and won the first of them at Spa Francorchamps. In 2011 Vilarino also took part in one V de V European Endurance Challenge Race, the Jarama 4 Hours and scored an overall victory in the race. In 2012, Vilariño stayed in the Racecar Euro Series, where he would become the first series champion under official NASCAR sanctioning after he scored six race wins and 8 podiums. and he was locked into the 2013 UNOH Battle at the Beach at Daytona International Speedway, finishing 23rd after suffering an engine problem on lap 98.

Vilariño successfully defended his title in 2013, having scored seven race wins and ten podiums on his way to win his second Euro Series title. In 2014, Vilariño would narrowly lose the title by just 1 point from Anthony Kumpen, having scored three wins and ten podiums during the course of the season. On the same year, Vilariño would also receive an opportunity to race at the NASCAR K&N Pro Series East race at Watkins Glen, although he would ultimately withdraw from the race itself. The following year, Vilariño would win his third title after scoring three wins, nine top-fives and twelve top-ten finishes before he left the series at the end of the year to switch to sports car racing in V de V and GT4 European Series.

Vilariño took part in the NASCAR Whelen Euro Series Recruitment Day testing event that was held at the end of the 2018 season, fueling speculations that Vilariño is going to return to the series in 2019. This was later confirmed to be true on 28 March 2019, as Vilariño is announced to be returning to the series after a three-year absence with Racing Engineering for the 2019 season. He would finish the season in fifth place after scoring two victories, both in his home race at Valencia.

In 2020, Vilariño was originally scheduled to move to DF1 Racing, but did not race that year due to family and business concerns brought on by the COVID-19 pandemic.

== Career ==
=== NASCAR ===
(key) (Bold – Pole position awarded by qualifying time. Italics – Pole position earned by points standings or practice time. * – Most laps led.)

==== K&N Pro Series East ====
NASCAR K&N Pro Series East results
Year	Team	No.	Make	1	2	3	4	5	6	7	8	9	10	11	12	13	14	15	16	NKNPSEC	Pts
2014	Troy Williams Racing	12	Dodge	NSM	DAY	BRI	GRE	RCH	IOW	BGS	FIF	LGY	NHA	COL	IOW	GLN; Wth	VIR	GRE	DOV	68th	17

==== Whelen Euro Series - Elite 1 / PRO ====
NASCAR Whelen Euro Series - Elite 1 results
Year	Team	No.	Make	1	2	3	4	5	6	7	8	9	10	11	12	13	NWES	Pts
2012	TFT-Banco Santander	2	Chevy	**NOG**; 1	NOG; 1*	BRH; 1*	BRH; 2*	**SPA**; 1**	SPA; 2	VAL; 1**	VAL; 1*	**BUG**; 7	BUG; 10				1st	667
2013	TFT-Banco Santander	2	Chevy	**NOG**; 1**	NOG; 1	**DIJ**; 1**	DIJ; 1**	BRH; 1	BRH; 1**	TOU; 10	TOU; 8	**MNZ**; 1*	MNZ; 3	BUG; 4	BUG; 4		1st	696
2014	TFT-Banco Santander	2	Chevy	VAL; 25	VAL; 1**	BRH; 3	BRH; 1**	TOU; 1	TOU; 2*	**NÜR**; 2	NÜR; 23	UMB; 1*	UMB; 2	**BUG**; 3	BUG; 4		2nd	655
2015	TFT-Banco Santander	2	Chevy	VAL; 2	VAL; 1**	VEN; 7	VEN; 2	BRH; 3	BRH; 1*	TOU; 3	TOU; 1**	UMB; 2	UMB; 5	ZOL; 6	ZOL; 6		1st	662
2019	Racing Engineering	48	Ford	**VAL**; 1*	**VAL**; 1*	FRA; 25	FRA; 6	BRH; 26	BRH; 5	MOS; 10	MOS; 9	VEN; 4	HOC; 23	HOC; 14	ZOL; 10^	ZOL; 12	5th	463

=== Spain, France, Portugal ===
- 1995 **Elf Steering Winner**
- 1996 Formula Renault Campus (la filiére), 4th place, 2 wins, 2 pole positions, 6 fastest laps, 3 podiums.
- 1997 Formula Renault International Finals, 4th place.
- 1998 Formula Renault (la filiére). Best places: 5th Pau, 5th Ledenon.
- 1999 Winner of 3 ice rallies in Andorra Series, winner of Garbi Hill Climb and 2nd in Jaizkibel Hill Climb. 5 Rallies Saxo Cup, best place 3rd in Caja Cantabria, 5 cup best times in stages.
- 2000 **Spanish Champion Formula Super Toyota**, 6 wins, 2 pole positions, 2 fastest laps, 6 podiums.
- 2001 **Spanish Formula 3 Champion** – 6 wins, 9 pole Positions, 8 podiums, 8 fastest laps.
- 2005 Winner in Magny Cours French Sport Cars Championship..
- 2005 3rd Place Monza Italian Sport Cars Championship.
- 2005 Basque Hill Climb Champion.
- 2010 Basque Hill Climb Champion.

=== Europe ===
- 2001 European Le Mans Series 1000 km Estoril (Porsche GT3). DNF.
- 2001 Indoor World Cup Karting (Bercy).
- 2002 World Series by Nissan, 1 pole Position, 2 podiums, **rookie of the year**.
- 2003 World Series by Nissan, 2 wins, 2 pole positions, 5 podiums.
- 2003 Chosen by Auto Hebdo Sport **Circuit Spanish revelation driver**.
- 2004 FIA European Hill Climb Cup (F3000 Reynard 93D). (2 races), 1 win, 1 2nd place.
- 2005 **FIA European Hill Climb Cup Champion** (F3000 Reynard K01) 6 wins, 5 records, 1 2nd place.
- 2006 FIA European Hill Climb Championship. (F3000 Reynard K01). Accident, season lost.
- 2007 **FIA European Hill Climb Champion** (F3000 Reynard K01). 9 wins, 5 Records, 1 2nd place.
- 2008 V de V European Endurance Challenge (Norma M20) – 7th place – 1 win, 3 poles, 3 fastest laps. Teammate: Andrés Vilariño.
- 2009 **V de V European Endurance Challenge (Norma M20) – 3rd place** – 2 wins, 1 pole, 2 fastest laps, 3 podiums, raced 4 out of 8 races. Teammate: Andrés Vilariño.
- 2011 FIA Speed Euroseries (Norma M20). 4 Races. 1 win, 2 pole positions, 1 fastest laps.
- 2011 V de V Endurance Challenge. 1 Race. 1 win, 1 pole position, 1 fastest lap.
- 2011 **FIA Euro-Racecar Series. 3rd place**. 2 wins, 3 pole position, 4 fastest laps, 5 podiums.
- 2012 **NASCAR Racecar Euro Series Champion** – 6 wins, 5 pole positions, 5 fastest laps, 8 podiums.
- 2013 **NASCAR Whelen Euro Series Champion** – 7 wins, 8 pole positions, 8 fastest laps, 8 podiums.
- 2014 **NASCAR Whelen Euro Series Runner-Up** – 4 wins, 7 pole positions, 7 fastest laps, 9 podiums.
- 2015 **NASCAR Whelen Euro Series Champion** – 3 wins, 2 pole positions, 3 fastest laps, 8 podiums.
- 2016 **V de V Challenge Endurance Proto Champion** – 4 wins, 6 podiums.
- 2017 **V de V Proto Endurance Challenge Champion** – 3 wins, 2 pole positions, 3 podiums.
- 2017 GT4 European Series Northern Cup Pro-Am class – 1 pole position, 2 podiums.
- 2017 GT4 European Series Southern Cup Pro-Am class – 1 podium.
- 2019 NASCAR Whelen Euro Series – 2 wins, 2 pole positions, 1 fastest laps, 2 podiums.

=== Awards ===
- 2001 – Award Gobierno Vasco and among the best guipuzcoan sportsmen for the APDG
- 2003 – Nominated to best sportsman for the APDG, and Award Gobierno Vasco and among the best guipuzcoan sportsmen for the APDG
- 2005 – Among the best guipuzcoan sportsmen for the APDG
- 2006 – **Olympic medal from the Spanish Olympic Committee Comité Olímpico Español**
- 2007 – Among the best Basque sportsmen El Correo
- 2007 – Nominated to best sportsman for the APDG and among the best guipuzcoan sportsmen for the APDG
- 2007 – Nominated to best sportsman for Euskadi Irratia.

Sporting positions
Preceded by none	Spanish Formula Three champion 2001	Succeeded by Marcel Costa
Preceded by Éric Hélary	NASCAR Whelen Euro Series Champion; 2012–2013	Succeeded by Anthony Kumpen
Preceded by Anthony Kumpen	NASCAR Whelen Euro Series Champion; 2015	Succeeded by Anthony Kumpen
