= Javier Villa =

Spanish racing driver

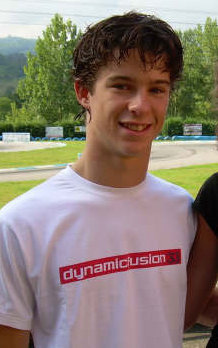
- Nationality: (Spain) Spanish
- Full name: Javier Villa García
- Born: 5 October 1987 (age 39) Colunga, Asturias, Spain

NASCAR Whelen Euro Series career
- Debut season: 2012
- Current team: Scorpus Racing
- Car number: 9
- Starts: 16
- Wins: 1
- Poles: 1
- Fastest laps: 2
- Best finish: 3rd in 2012

Previous series
- 2008–09, 2009–10 2008 2007 2006–09 2004–06 2010-11 2011: GP2 Asia Series International GT Open; Formula One testing GP2 Series; Spanish Formula Three; Spanish Mini Challenge; World Touring Car Championship

Championship titles
- 2010: NASCAR Europe Junior Trophy, 2 Spanish Championship

Javier Villa García (born 5 October 1987) is a Spanish former racing driver living in Arriondas, Asturias, Spain. He drove in the GP2 Series from 2006 to 2009. In 2010, he switched to touring cars, driving at the Spanish Mini Challenge and later the World Touring Car Championship. Villa finished third at the 2012 Racecar Euro Series stock car championship.

== Career ==
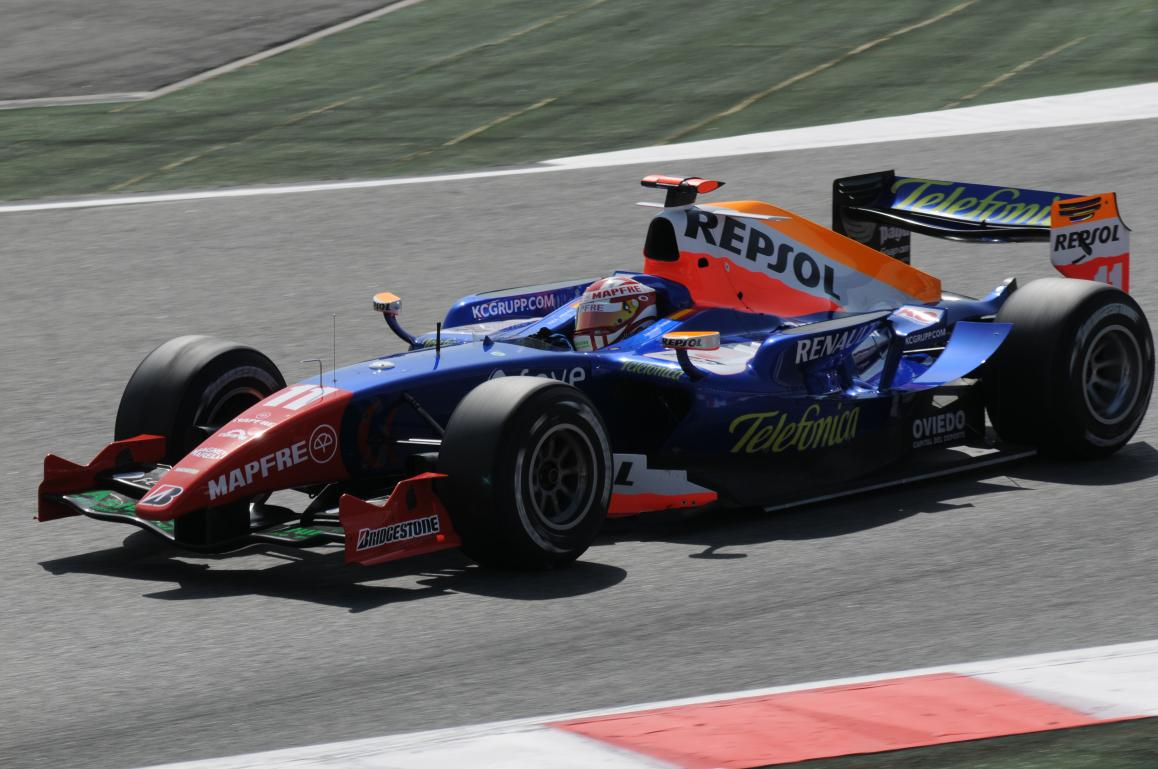
Villa driving for Racing Engineering at Barcelona round of the 2008 GP2 Series season.

Villa was born in Colunga, Asturias. Before driving in the GP2 Series in 2006, he raced in the Spanish F3 Championship, where he finished 4th overall in the 2005 season, with the Racing Engineering team.

Graduating to GP2 with Racing Engineering the next year, Villa's first season was pointless, but 2007 was a significant improvement. He took his first GP2 victory in 2007 at the sprint race at Magny-Cours. He started from second on the grid by dint of finishing seventh in the previous day's feature race. He then won the sprint races at the Nürburgring and Hungaroring from pole position. He stayed with Racing Engineering for a third season of GP2 in 2008. This season was disappointing as he slipped back to seventeenth in the championship, whereas team-mate Giorgio Pantano won it.

Villa drove for Super Nova Racing in the 2008–09 GP2 Asia Series season, and also drove for the team in the 2009 GP2 Series season. He was linked with a race seat at Formula One team Campos Grand Prix for 2010, but when they turned into Hispania Racing Team, he wasn't linked anymore.

For the 2010 season, Villa forged links with BMW driving in the Spanish Mini Challenge Championship. He won that title and was rewarded with a drive in the final round of the 2010 Australian Mini Challenge in Sydney finishing seventh.

In 2011, Villa would move to the World Touring Car Championship with Proteam Motorsport BMW team, where he scored his first podium in Hungary. He had a disappointing end to the season falling out of the top ten finishing 12th for the season. He was voted best rookie in the World Touring Car Championship for the 2011 season.

Villa was linked with the Formula One team Hispania Racing with a view to replace Vitantonio Liuzzi. He again competed in the Spanish Mini Challenge in 2011 and despite missing three races, still finished in fifth position for the championship.

Villa moved for 2012 to the Racecar Euro Series, a NASCAR-sanctioned stock car championship, where he finished third in the championship with a win and six podium finishes.

== Racing record ==
| Season | Series | Team name | Races | Poles | Wins | Podiums | Points | Position |
|---|---|---|---|---|---|---|---|---|
| 2004 | Spanish F3 Championship | Elide Racing | 14 | 0 | 1 | 1 | 29 | 9th |
| 2005 | Spanish F3 Championship | Racing Engineering | 14 | 2 | 2 | 6 | 96 | 4th |
| 2006 | GP2 Series | Racing Engineering | 21 | 0 | 0 | 0 | 0 | 26th |
| 2006 | Spanish F3 Championship | Racing Engineering | 2 | 0 | 0 | 1 | 10 | 15th |
| 2007 | GP2 Series | Racing Engineering | 21 | 0 | 3 | 5 | 42 | 6th |
| 2008 | GP2 Series | Racing Engineering | 19 | 0 | 0 | 0 | 8 | 17th |
| 2008 | International GT Open | Roger Racing | 1 | 0 | 0 | 0 | 0 | NC |
| 2008–09 | GP2 Asia Series | Super Nova Racing | 11 | 0 | 0 | 1 | 12 | 10th |
| 2009 | GP2 Series | Super Nova Racing | 20 | 0 | 0 | 3 | 27 | 10th |
| 2009–10 | GP2 Asia Series | Arden International | 6 | 0 | 0 | 2 | 19 | 4th |
| 2010 | Spanish Mini Challenge | BMW Spain | 6 | ? | 4 | 6 | 214 | **1st** |
| 2011 | World Touring Car Championship | Proteam Racing | 24 | 1 | 0 | 1 | 59 | 12th |
| 2011 | Spanish Mini Challenge | BMW Spain | 12 | 7 | 4 | 3 | 217 | 5th |

=== Complete Spanish Formula Three Championship results ===
(key) (Races in bold indicate pole position) (Races in italics indicate fastest lap)

| Year | Entrant | 1 | 2 | 3 | 4 | 5 | 6 | 7 | 8 | 9 | 10 | 11 | 12 | 13 | 14 | 15 | 16 | DC | Points |
|---|---|---|---|---|---|---|---|---|---|---|---|---|---|---|---|---|---|---|---|
| 2004 | EV Racing | ALB; 1; 13 | ALB; 2; 7 | JAR; 1; 6 | JAR; 2 Ret | JER; 1; 11 | JER; 2; 10 | EST; 1; 7 | EST; 2; 14 | | | | | | | | | 9th | 29 |
| 2004 | JV – Elide Racing | | | | | | | | | VAL; 1; 7 | VAL; 2 Ret | JER; 1; 6 | JER; 2 Ret | CAT; 1; 4 | CAT; 2; 9 | | | 9th | 29 |
| 2005 | Racing Engineering | JAR; 1; 5 | JAR; 2; 7 | **VAL**; **1**; 2 | VAL; 2; 1 | **ALB**; 1 | EST; 1; 2 | EST; 2; 3 | ALB; 1; 16 | ALB; 2 Ret | **VAL**; **1**; 1 | VAL; 2; 4 | JER; 1; 5 | JER; 2; 15 | CAT; 1; 3 | CAT; 2 Ret | | 4th | 96 |
| 2006 | Racing Engineering | VAL; 1 | VAL; 2 | MAG; 1; 2 | MAG; 2; 2 | JAR; 1 | JAR; 2 | EST; 1 | EST; 2 | ALB; 1 | ALB; 2 | VAL; 1 | VAL; 2 | JER; 1 | JER; 2 | CAT; 1; 2 | CAT; 2; 18 | NC | - |

=== Complete GP2 Series results ===
(key) (Races in bold indicate pole position) (Races in italics indicate fastest lap)

| Year | Entrant | 1 | 2 | 3 | 4 | 5 | 6 | 7 | 8 | 9 | 10 | 11 | 12 | 13 | 14 | 15 | 16 | 17 | 18 | 19 | 20 | 21 | DC | Points |
|---|---|---|---|---|---|---|---|---|---|---|---|---|---|---|---|---|---|---|---|---|---|---|---|---|
| 2006 | Racing Engineering | VAL; FEA; 18 | VAL; SPR; 9 | IMO; FEA; 13 | IMO; SPR; 18 | NÜR; FEA; 9 | NÜR; SPR; 20 | CAT; FEA; 14 | CAT; SPR; 15 | MON; FEA; Ret | SIL; FEA; 14 | SIL; SPR; 13 | MAG; FEA; 17 | MAG; SPR; 16 | HOC; FEA; 11 | HOC; SPR; 13 | HUN; FEA; Ret | HUN; SPR; 15† | IST; FEA; 15 | IST; SPR; 16 | MNZ; FEA; 9 | MNZ; SPR; Ret | 26th | 0 |
| 2007 | Racing Engineering | BHR; FEA; Ret | BHR; SPR; 10 | CAT; FEA; 8 | CAT; SPR; 2 | MON; FEA; Ret | MAG; FEA; 7 | MAG; SPR; 1 | SIL; FEA; 13 | SIL; SPR; 22† | NÜR; FEA; 8 | NÜR; SPR; 1 | HUN; FEA; 8 | HUN; SPR; 1 | IST; FEA; 12 | IST; SPR; Ret | MNZ; FEA; 6 | MNZ; SPR; Ret | SPA; FEA; 4 | SPA; SPR; 15 | VAL; FEA; 8 | VAL; SPR; 2 | 6th | 42 |
| 2008 | Racing Engineering | CAT; FEA; 14 | CAT; SPR; 6 | IST; FEA; 7 | IST; SPR; 15 | MON; FEA; 14 | MON; SPR; 13 | MAG; FEA; 14 | MAG; SPR; 10 | SIL; FEA; 13 | SIL; SPR; Ret | HOC; FEA; 10† | HOC; SPR; 5 | HUN; FEA; 13 | HUN; SPR; 6 | VAL; FEA; Ret | VAL; SPR; 5 | SPA; FEA; 17 | SPA; SPR; 8 | MNZ; FEA; Ret | MNZ; SPR; EX | | 17th | 8 |
| 2009 | Super Nova Racing | CAT; FEA; 10 | CAT; SPR; Ret | MON; FEA; 10 | MON; SPR; 8 | IST; FEA; 7 | IST; SPR; 2 | SIL; FEA; Ret | SIL; SPR; 15 | NÜR; FEA; 5 | NÜR; SPR; 6 | HUN; FEA; 3 | HUN; SPR; 5 | VAL; FEA; 18† | VAL; SPR; 9 | SPA; FEA; 13 | SPA; SPR; 10 | MNZ; FEA; 7 | MNZ; SPR; 10 | ALG; FEA; 13 | ALG; SPR; 2 | | 10th | 27 |

==== Complete GP2 Asia Series results ====
(key) (Races in bold indicate pole position) (Races in italics indicate fastest lap)

| Year | Entrant | 1 | 2 | 3 | 4 | 5 | 6 | 7 | 8 | 9 | 10 | 11 | 12 | DC | Points |
|---|---|---|---|---|---|---|---|---|---|---|---|---|---|---|---|
| 2008–09 | Super Nova Racing | SHI; FEA; 4 | SHI; SPR; 3 | DUB; FEA; 9 | DUB; SPR; C | BHR1; FEA; 9 | BHR1; SPR; 5 | LSL; FEA; 13 | LSL; SPR; 10 | SEP; FEA; 19 | SEP; SPR; 18 | BHR2; FEA; 15 | BHR2; SPR; 12 | 10th | 12 |
| 2009–10 | Arden International | YMC1; FEA | YMC1; SPR | YMC2; FEA; 4 | YMC2; SPR; 11 | BHR1; FEA; 3 | BHR1; SPR; 3 | BHR2; FEA; 7 | BHR2; SPR; 6 | | | | | 4th | 19 |

=== Complete World Touring Car Championship results ===
(key) (Races in bold indicate pole position) (Races in italics indicate fastest lap)

| Year | Team | Car | 1 | 2 | 3 | 4 | 5 | 6 | 7 | 8 | 9 | 10 | 11 | 12 | 13 | 14 | 15 | 16 | 17 | 18 | 19 | 20 | 21 | 22 | 23 | 24 | DC | Points |
|---|---|---|---|---|---|---|---|---|---|---|---|---|---|---|---|---|---|---|---|---|---|---|---|---|---|---|---|---|
| 2011 | Proteam Racing | BMW 320 TC | BRA; 1; 14 | BRA; 2; 8 | BEL; 1; 9 | BEL; 2; 10 | ITA; 1; 8 | ITA; 2; 8 | HUN; 1; 3 | HUN; 2; 7 | CZE; 1; 9 | CZE; 2; 7 | POR; 1 Ret | POR; 2; 17 | GBR; 1; 17 | GBR; 2; 16 | GER; 1; 12 | GER; 2; 10 | ESP; 1; 6 | ESP; 2; 19 | JPN; 1; 12 | JPN; 2; 8 | CHN; 1; 10 | CHN; 2 Ret | MAC; 1; 11 | MAC; 2; 10 | **12th** | **59** |

=== NASCAR ===
(key) (Bold – Pole position awarded by qualifying time. Italics – Pole position earned by points standings or practice time. * – Most laps led.)

==== Whelen Euro Series - Elite 1 ====
NASCAR Whelen Euro Series - Elite 1 results
| Year | Team | No. | Make | 1 | 2 | 3 | 4 | 5 | 6 | 7 | 8 | 9 | 10 | 11 | 12 | NWES | Pts |
|---|---|---|---|---|---|---|---|---|---|---|---|---|---|---|---|---|---|
| 2012 | TFT Racing | 64 | Dodge | NOG; 4 | NOG; 2 | | | | | | | | | | | 3rd | 603 |
| 2012 | TFT Racing | 64 | Chevy | | | BRH; 3 | BRH; 1 | | | | | | | | | 3rd | 603 |
| 2012 | Gonneau Racing | 64 | Chevy | | | | | SPA; 19 | SPA; 3 | **VAL**; 2 | VAL; 3 | BUG; 6 | BUG; 6 | | | 3rd | 603 |
| 2013 | Scorpus Racing | 9 | Chevy | NOG; 22 | NOG; 2 | DIJ; 20 | DIJ; 20 | BRH; 8 | BRH; 5 | TOU | TOU | MNZ | MNZ | BUG | BUG | 20th | 187 |
