= Romain Iannetta =

French racing driver

- Nationality: (France) French
- Born: September 29, 1979 (age 47) Villecresnes, France
- Relatives: Alain Iannetta (nephew)

NASCAR Whelen Euro Series career
- Debut season: 2012
- Current team: Marko Stipp Motorsport
- Categorisation: FIA Silver (until 2022); FIA Bronze (2023–)
- Car number: 46
- Engine: Chevrolet
- Former teams: Orhès Competition, RDV Competition, TFT Racing, Go Fas Racing, Racing Engineering
- Starts: 71
- Wins: 2
- Poles: 1
- Fastest laps: 2
- Best finish: 3rd in 2015
- Finished last season: 20th in 2021

24 Hours of Le Mans career
- Years: 2005 – 2007, 2009, 2012
- Best finish: 23rd (2006)
- Class wins: 0

Romain Iannetta (born 27 November 1979) is a French racing driver who last competed in the GT4 European Series, driving the No. 77 Audi R8 LMS GT4 Evo for Full Motorsport. He also competes part-time in the NASCAR Whelen Euro Series as the driver of the No. 46 Chevrolet Camaro for Marko Stipp Motorsport in the EuroNASCAR PRO class.

Iannetta is the nephew of driver Alain Iannetta who participated in 24 Hours of Le Mans three times (1988, 1989 and 1990).

In parallel to his passion, Iannetta is an instructor at the flight school PRO'PULSION (Dreux and Issoire) and driving a Ferrari 360 Modena for JMB Racing. He also worked for many auto manufacturers at the launch of new vehicles on the market (Volkswagen, Audi, Citroën, Renault, Alfa Romeo...).

It began in 2000 in the trade of the automotive stunt team CINE CASCADE directed by Jean-Claude Lagnes. It revolves mainly around feature films such as: Le Boulet, Ripoux 3, San Antonio, Hush!, Taxi, 36 Quai des Orfèvres, The Bourne Identity and The Mental Love your father.

Iannetta was awarded the World Stunt Awards in the United States for the best sequence on a vehicle for the year 2003 for the film "The Bourne Identity".

== Career ==
2009

- 24 Hours of Le Mans 2009 with Creation-Judd/LMP1 - Creation Autosportif

2008

- Championship of Spain Supercopa SEAT León

2007

- 24 Hours of Le Mans 2007 Courage AER LMP2 - Noel Del Bello Racing - 8th in the Championship of Spain Supercopa SEAT León (3 podiums - 2 wins) - 5th in the World Cup Fun Cup (Optimum Racing - FEK)

2006

- 6th in GT2 at the 24 Hours of Le Mans Porsche 996 GT3-RSR - Ice Pol Racing Team - Le Mans Series in a Porsche 996 GT3-RSR - Ice Pol Racing Team (2 races) - Winner of World Cup Fun Cup at Jarama - Optimum Racing (FEK) - Andros Trophy (3 races) on Citroën C4 Silhouette - Carmine Team Competition (3 of Promotion in Val Thorens) - 6th Class of the 24 Hours of Barcelona Seat Leon Supercopa

2005

- Le Mans Endurance Series on Courage C65-Mecachrome - Team Noel Del Bello Racing - Le Mans Endurance Series on Chrysler Viper GTS-R - Paul Belmondo Racing Team - 24 Hours of Le Mans on Mecachrome Courage C65 - Team Noel Del Bello Racing

2004

- Spanish Championship SEAT León - 1 Racing Championship of French Touring Car Championship

2002

- Champion of French Formula Ford Promotion (8 wins in 9 races) - Vice-Champion of French Formula Ford (9 podiums in 9 races) - Tested by Welter Racing to participate in the 24 Hours of Le Mans and 12 Hours of Sebring - Tested by a team of BMW Touring Car Silhouette

2001

- Championnat de French Formula Renault - Winner of 4 hours of Spa Peugeot 106 - Winner of the race Lédenon Formula Ford

2000

- 5th in the Championnat de French Formula Ford Promotion (3 podiums) - Participation in the European Championship and 2nd Festival POWERTOUR at Spa

1999

- 3rd in the Flying ACO Automobile Club de l'Ouest - Championnat de French Formula Renault Elf Campus (1 win) - Winner of 10 hours of Soucy Karting

1995–1998

- France Karting Championship Yamaha (15 podiums) - Tests in Caterham - Flying school self ACO Le Mans - Championnat de France Endurance Karting

1993–1994

- Flying school E.T.A. Karting, kart course Y.D.K.

1988–1991

- Stage of motorcycle riding, participation in Jacadi Trophy

== Motorsports career results ==
=== 24 Hours of Le Mans results ===
Year	Team	Co-Drivers	Car	Class	Laps	Pos.	Class Pos.
2005	(France) Noël del Bello Racing	(Switzerland) Christophe Pillon (Portugal) Ni Amorim	Courage C65-Mecachrome	LMP2	99	DNF	DNF
2006	(Belgium) Gordon Racing Team (Belgium) Ice Pol Racing Team	(Belgium) Yves-Emmanuel Lambert (Belgium) Christian Lefort	Porsche 911 GT3-RSR	GT2	282	23rd	6th
2007	(France) Noël del Bello Racing	(Russia) Vitaly Petrov (United States) Liz Halliday	Courage LC75-AER	LMP2	198	DNF	DNF
2009	(United Kingdom) Creation Autosportif	(United Kingdom) Jamie Campbell-Walter (Belgium) Vanina Ickx	Creation CA07-Judd	LMP1	319	24th	15th
2012	(Republic of Ireland) Status Grand Prix	(United Kingdom) Alexander Sims (Netherlands) Yelmer Buurman	Lola B12/80-Judd	LMP2	239	DNF	DNF

=== NASCAR ===
(key) (Bold – Pole position. Italics – Fastest lap. * – Most laps led. ^ – Most positions gained)

==== Whelen Euro Series - EuroNASCAR PRO ====
NASCAR Whelen Euro Series - EuroNASCAR PRO results
Year	Team	No.	Make	1	2	3	4	5	6	7	8	9	10	11	12	13	NWES	Pts
2012	Orhès Competition	25	Dodge	NOG; 5	NOG; 16	BRH; 5	BRH; 9	SPA; 20	SPA; 1*	VAL; 10	VAL; 4	BUG; 3	BUG; 3				5th	566
2013	RDV Competition	28	Chevy	NOG; 3	NOG; 5	DIJ; 21	DIJ; 4	BRH; 17	BRH; 8								4th	610
2013	RDV Competition	1	Chevy							TOU; 7	TOU; 11	MNZ; 4	MNZ; 4*	BUG; 3	BUG; 2		4th	610
2014	RDV Competition	23	Chevy	VAL; 9	VAL; 19	BRH; 27	BRH; 27	TOU; 12	TOU; 11	NÜR	NÜR	UMB	UMB	BUG	BUG		28th	151
2015	TFT Racing	7	Chevy	VAL; 20	VAL; 5	VEN; 3	VEN; 3	BRH; 1*	**BRH**; 2*	TOU; 15	TOU; 6	UMB; 10	UMB; 2	ZOL; 5	ZOL; 5		3rd	614
2018	Go Fas Racing	32	Ford	VAL; 12	VAL; 6	FRA; 26	FRA; 27	BRH; 20	BRH; 9	TOU; 16	TOU; 3	HOC; 12	HOC; 23	ZOL; 22	ZOL; 11		10th	347
2019	Racing Engineering	88	Ford	VAL; 24	VAL; 7	FRA; 26	FRA; 9	BRH; 6	BRH; 6	MOS; 18	MOS; 3	VEN; 6	HOC; 21	HOC; 4	ZOL; 13	ZOL; 13	10th	427
2021	Marko Stipp Motorsport	46	Chevy	ESP	ESP	GBR	GBR	CZE; 17	CZE; 15	CRO; 6	CRO; 8	BEL	BEL	ITA; 9	ITA; 7		20th	217
