= TFT Racing =

French auto racing team

(France) TFT Racing
- Founded: April 26, 2005; 21 years ago
- Founder(s): Tony Pereira; Flavio Prodolliet; Thierry Fornerod
- Base: Nogaro, Gers
- Team principal(s): Tony Pereira
- Current series: V de V Proto Endurance Challenge
- Former series: NASCAR Whelen Euro Series (2012–2015)
- Current drivers: (Spain) Ander Vilariño (France) Alain Ferté
- Drivers' Championships: NASCAR Whelen Euro Series (2012, 2013, 2015)

TFT Racing is a French racing team. The team was very successful in the NASCAR Whelen Euro Series winning three drivers titles in four years. The team is a long time competitor in the V de V Proto Endurance Challenge.

== History ==
TFT
- Type: SARL
- Industry: Automotive
- Founded: April 26, 2005; 21 years ago in Nogaro, Gers, France
- Founders: Tony Pereira; Flavio Prodolliet; Thierry Fornerod
- Headquarters: Nogaropole, Nogaro, France
- Revenue: € 1.214.200 (2015)
- Net income: € 109.900 (2015)
- Total assets: € 675.900 (2015)
- Total equity: € 427.200 (2015)

The team was founded on 26 April 2005 by Tony Pereira, Flavio Prodolliet and Thierry Fornerod. The team is based near the Circuit Paul Armagnac in Nogaro. The team first settled at the Avenue des Sports until 2007, until late 2016 team was located at the Route D'Auch. As of October 2016 the team is located near the circuit along with other racing teams at the Nogaropole industrial zone.

=== V de V Proto Endurance Challenge ===
In 2008 TFT Racing started in the V de V Proto Endurance Challenge, a Group CN based racing series. The team originally entered as Vilarino Motorsport with Andres, Ander and Angel Vilarino. The team also supported various other entries al racing the Norma M20 F. The equipe with Philippe Vidal and Denis Caillon was the best placed TFT car in the championship, placing tenth.

Ander and Andres Vilarino started the 2009 season very well, winning at Jarama and Paul Ricard. Racing only four races, half the season, the team secured the third place in the championship.

In 2011 TFT did not race their own cars in the V de V series, but supported cars from other teams. The best result was for the TFT Racing supported teams was with Top Loc Racing. At Mugello, Philippe Thirion, Bruno Bazaud and Denis Caillon, finished fourth. Bazaud scored the best results for TFT Racing in 2012, placing third in the championship standings. Bazaud did not win races but was a consistent podium finisher.

=== NASCAR Whelen Euro Series ===
TFT Racing stepped into the NASCAR Whelen Euro Series in 2012, the first season the series received NASCAR backing. Ander Vilarino won both opening races at the teams hometrack, Nogaro. Vilarino won six races during the season and the championship while his teammate Javier Villa won one race finished third in the championship. The late Enzo Pastor debuted in the series at Brands Hatch joining the team in 2013 full-time. For 2013 Vilarino remained in the NASCAR team sharing his car with Eric Quntal in the Open class. The Spaniard dominated the Elite class, winning the first six races of the season.

PK Carsport was the main championship rival to TFT for 2014. Despite winning four races, Vilarino finished second in the series. The Spaniard finished second to PK Carsports Anthony Kumpen. Vilarino again won the championship in 2015. The championship was won in the penultimate round at Autodromo dell'Umbria when Vilarino scored more points to championship rival Alon Day. Third place in the championship was won by TFT racer Romain Iannetta. The team left the series as defending champions and returned to the V de V Endurance Series.

=== Complete NASCAR Whelen Euro Series - Elite 1 results ===
(key) (Bold – Pole position awarded by qualifying time. Italics – Pole position earned by points standings or practice time. * – Most laps led.)

NASCAR Whelen Euro Series - Elite 1
Year	Car	No.	Drivers	1	2	3	4	5	6	7	8	9	10	11	12	NWES	Points
2012	Chevrolet	2	(Spain) Ander Vilarino	(France); NOG; 1	(France); NOG; 1	(United Kingdom); BRH; 1	(United Kingdom); BRH; 2	(Belgium); SPA; 2	(Belgium); SPA; 2	(France); TOU; 2	(France); TOU; 2	(Spain); VAL; 2	(Spain); VAL; 2	(France); LEM; 2	(France); LEM; 2	1st	667
2012	Chevrolet	64	(Spain) Javier Villa	(France); NOG; 4	(France); NOG; 2	(United Kingdom); BRH; 3	(United Kingdom); BRH; 1	(Belgium); SPA; 19	(Belgium); SPA; 3	(France); TOU; 11	(France); TOU; 15	(Spain); VAL; 2	(Spain); VAL; 3	(France); LEM; 6	(France); LEM; 6	3rd	603
2013	Chevrolet	2	(Spain) Ander Vilarino	(France); NOG; 1	(France); NOG; 1	(France); DIJ; 1	(France); DIJ; 1	(United Kingdom); BRH; 1	(United Kingdom); BRH; 1	(France); TOU; 10	(France); TOU; 8	(Italy); MON; 1	(Italy); MON; 3	(France); LEM; 4	(France); LEM; 4	1st	696
2013	Chevrolet	7	(France) Anthony Gandon	(France); NOG; 6	(France); NOG; 15	(France); DIJ; 6	(France); DIJ; 8	(United Kingdom); BRH; 6	(United Kingdom); BRH; 10	(France); TOU; 8	(France); TOU; 21	(Italy); MON; 5	(Italy); MON; 7	(France); LEM; 11	(France); LEM; 9	6th	566
2014	Chevrolet	2	(Spain) Ander Vilarino	(Spain); VAL; 25	(Spain); VAL; 1	(United Kingdom); BRH; 3	(United Kingdom); BRH; 1	(France); TOU; 1	(France); TOU; 2	(Germany); NUR; 2	(Germany); NUR; 23	(Italy); UMB; 1	(Italy); UMB; 2	(France); LEM; 3	(France); LEM; 4	2nd	656
2014	Chevrolet	7	(France) Anthony Gandon	(Spain); VAL; 11	(Spain); VAL; 25	(United Kingdom); BRH; 14	(United Kingdom); BRH; 10	(France); TOU; 9	(France); TOU; 14	(Germany); NUR; 9	(Germany); NUR; 7	(Italy); UMB; 10	(Italy); UMB; 15	(France); LEM; 7	(France); LEM; 15	10th	513
2015	Chevrolet	2	(Spain) Ander Vilarino	(Spain); VAL; 2	(Spain); VAL; 1	(Netherlands); VEN; 7	(Netherlands); VEN; 2	(United Kingdom); BRH; 3	(United Kingdom); BRH; 1	(France); TOU; 3	(France); TOU; 1	(Italy); UMB; 2	(Italy); UMB; 5	(Belgium); ZOL; 6	(Belgium); ZOL; 6	1st	662
2015	Chevrolet	7	(France) Romain Iannetta	(Spain); VAL; 20	(Spain); VAL; 5	(Netherlands); VEN; 3	(Netherlands); VEN; 3	(United Kingdom); BRH; 1	(United Kingdom); BRH; 2	(France); TOU; 15	(France); TOU; 6	(Italy); UMB; 10	(Italy); UMB; 2	(Belgium); ZOL; 5	(Belgium); ZOL; 5	3rd	614
