= 2011 Guia Race of Macau =

Race details
- Round 12 of 12 in the 2011 World Touring Car Championship at Guia Circuit in Macau.
- Date: 20 November, 2011
- Location: Macau
- Course: Guia Circuit; 6.120 kilometres (3.803 mi)

Race One
- Laps: 11
Pole position
Driver		(United Kingdom) Robert Huff	Chevrolet RML
Time		2:30.881	
Podium
First		(United Kingdom) Robert Huff	Chevrolet RML
Second		(France) Yvan Muller	Chevrolet RML
Third		(Italy) Gabriele Tarquini	Lukoil-SUNRED
Fastest Lap
Driver		(France) Yvan Muller	Chevrolet RML
Time		2:32.146	

Race Two
- Laps: 11
Podium
First		(United Kingdom) Robert Huff	Chevrolet RML
Second		(Netherlands) Tom Coronel	ROAL Motorsport
Third		(France) Yvan Muller	Chevrolet RML
Fastest Lap
Driver		(United Kingdom) Robert Huff	Chevrolet RML
Time		2:32.173	

The 2011 Guia Race of Macau was the twelfth and final round of the 2011 World Touring Car Championship season and the seventh running of the Guia Race of Macau as part of the World Touring Car Championship. It was held on 20 November 2011 on the Guia Circuit in the Chinese special administrative region of Macau. The race was part of the Macau Grand Prix weekend, headlined by the 2011 Macau Grand Prix Formula Three.

Both races were won by Robert Huff of Chevrolet RML.

Yvan Muller claimed his third world drivers' championship title, his second in a row. Kristian Poulsen secured the Yokohama Independent Drivers' Trophy title.

== Background ==
Coming into the final round, Muller was leading the drivers' championship with Huff second as the only other driver in mathematical contention for the title. Poulsen was leading the Yokohama Independents' Trophy.

Yukinori Taniguchi did not take part in the round due to damage sustained at the Race of China, leaving bamboo-engineering to run a single car for Darryl O'Young. Gary Kwok replaced Colin Turkington at Wiechers-Sport, the Canadian making his debut in the series having competed in the Canadian Touring Car Championship in 2011. Having wrapped up the Jay–Ten Trophy for drivers in natural aspirated cars, Fabio Fabiani was replaced at Liqui Moly Team Engstler by local driver Jo Merszei. Four other local drivers joined the grid for the round with André Couto joining SUNRED Engineering for his annual appearance at the race, RPM Racing Team ran a BMW 320si for Mak Ka Lok and Corsa Motorsport ran a pair of Chevrolet Lacettis for Felipe De Souza and Kuok Io Keong. The 778 Auto Sport team entered an ex–Swedish Touring Car Championship Peugeot 308 for Lo Ka Chun.

== Race report ==
=== Testing and free practice ===
The track was damp before the start of testing on Thursday, the session started half an hour late due to barrier repairs. Huff set the fastest time, beating teammate Muller on his final lap. Charles Ng brought the red flags out when he hit the barriers at the Melco Hairpin and came to a halt. After going through scrutineering after the session, the 778 Auto Sport Peugeot was found not to comply with its original documentation from when it was run in the STCC. As a result, the team was excluded from the rest of the event.

Alain Menu led a Chevrolet 1–2–3 in the first free practice session on Friday morning, Tiago Monteiro was best of the rest in fourth.

Huff was back on top in free practice two at the head of another Chevrolet 1–2–3. Javier Villa crashed his Proteam Racing BMW 320 TC at Paiol but the session was stopped early after Fredy Barth crashed at Faraway. Having come to a stop in the middle of the track, the front of the car caught fire and once Barth was extracted from the wreckage he was taken to the local hospital for precautionary checks.

=== Qualifying ===
The two championship contenders filled the front row with Huff securing pole position for race one ahead of Muller. Robert Dahlgren topped the first session putting him tenth for race two, Franz Engstler was tenth at the end of Q1 to take pole position for the second race ahead of Michel Nykjær and Huff. Menu was the biggest name to drop out of qualifying in the first session, a late collision with Couto hindering him in the final moments. There was a confrontation between the two drivers after the session before Menu left the circuit. Barth had missed the session having been kept in hospital following his practice crash.

The second session was interrupted by a red flag when Dahlgren's Volvo crashed at the Solitude Esses, like Barth his car burst into flames shortly after the accident. Dahlgren got out of the car but required medical attention afterwards, and did not start the races. When the session resumed, Huff secured pole position having beaten Muller on both his flying laps, Gabriele Tarquini was third while O'Young was the quickest independent driver in bamboo's only car. O'Young and Nykjær were the only two Yokohama Trophy title contenders who made it through to the second session.

=== Warm-Up ===
Huff was quickest in Sunday morning's warm–up session. The session came to a close early when Aleksei Dudukalo hit the barriers at Faraway Hill before coming to a halt in the middle of the track and being hit by the Proteam BMW of Ma.

=== Race One ===
Huff started from pole position and he kept his lead at the start followed by Muller and Tarquini. Further back Couto spun at the high speed Mandarin corner and collected Menu, the safety car picked up the field at the end of the lap as the debris was cleared. The race was resumed on lap five, Monteiro went straight on down the escape road at the Lisboa corner and dropped to near the back of the field. At the same time, O'Young and Mehdi Bennani made contact and the safety car was required again. The safety car went in at the end of lap seven, on lap nine Dudukalo crashed at Moorish Hill although the race was able to continue. The narrow streets of Macau usually see very little overtaking, on lap ten there were two intra–team battles going on with Engstler getting past teammate Poulsen to take sixth while Bennani overtook Proteam teammate Villa for the final points paying position. Bennani moved up another place on the final lap at the expense of Pepe Oriola as Huff won the race to reduce the championship points gap by seven points to Muller who was second. Tarquini was third to take the final podium spot while Nykjær was the independents' winner in fifth.

=== Race Two ===
Engstler was on pole position while O'Young started from the pit lane. Coronel took the start from fourth at the start with Nykjær and Huff following. Huff then moved up to second place while Engstler lost another place to Muller and moved down to sixth, he was down to eighth by the second lap when he was passed by Tarquini and Michelisz. Huff passed Coronel for the lead at Lisboa on lap three while Muller closed in on Huff by taking fourth from Bennani. The safety car came out shortly after when Kwok crashed at Mandarin and brought out the safety car. The race resumed on lap six and one lap later, local drivers Mak and de Souza came together at Lisboa. Lap nine and Muller moved into the final podium place at the expense of Nykjær, two laps later Tarquini would demote the Danish driver to fifth. Huff won the second race of the day with Coronel second and Muller third who secured the drivers' title by three points. Nykjær was the independent winner once again while Poulsen claimed the independents' title.

== Results ==
=== Qualifying ===
Pos.	No.	Name	Team	Car	C	Q1	Q2
1	2	(United Kingdom) Robert Huff	Chevrolet RML	Chevrolet Cruze 1.6T		2:34.224	2:30.881
2	1	(France) Yvan Muller	Chevrolet RML	Chevrolet Cruze 1.6T		2:33.353	2:31.149
3	3	(Italy) Gabriele Tarquini	Lukoil-SUNRED	SUNRED SR León 1.6T		2:34.085	2:32.147
4	9	(Hong Kong) Darryl O'Young	bamboo-engineering	Chevrolet Cruze 1.6T	Y	2:33.177	2:32.519
5	15	(Netherlands) Tom Coronel	ROAL Motorsport	BMW 320 TC		2:34.171	2:33.825
6	25	(Morocco) Mehdi Bennani	Proteam Racing	BMW 320 TC	Y	2:33.976	2:34.355
7	66	(Macau) André Couto	SUNRED Engineering	SUNRED SR León 1.6T		2:33.954	2:34.363
8	17	(Denmark) Michel Nykjær	SUNRED Engineering	SUNRED SR León 1.6T	Y	2:34.232	2:34.498
9	12	(Germany) **Franz Engstler**	Liqui Moly Team Engstler	BMW 320 TC	Y	2:34.232	2:34.876
10	30	(Sweden) Robert Dahlgren	Polestar Racing	Volvo C30 Drive		2:32.881	no time set
11	18	(Portugal) Tiago Monteiro	SUNRED Engineering	SUNRED SR León 1.6T		2:34.320	
12	5	(Hungary) Norbert Michelisz	Zengő-Dension Team	BMW 320 TC	Y	2:34.526	
13	8	(Switzerland) Alain Menu	Chevrolet RML	Chevrolet Cruze 1.6T		2:34.804	
14	11	(Denmark) Kristian Poulsen	Liqui Moly Team Engstler	BMW 320 TC	Y	2:35.131	
15	20	(Spain) Javier Villa	Proteam Racing	BMW 320 TC	Y	2:35.321	
16	74	(Spain) Pepe Oriola	SUNRED Engineering	SUNRED SR León 1.6T	Y	2:35.466	
17	4	(Russia) Aleksei Dudukalo	Lukoil-SUNRED	SUNRED SR León 1.6T	Y	2:36.694	
18	51	(Hong Kong) Charles Ng	DeTeam KK Motorsport	BMW 320 TC	Y	2:39.822	
19	28	(Canada) Gary Kwok	Wiechers-Sport	BMW 320 TC	Y	2:41.598	
20	52	(Macau) Jo Merszei	Liqui Moly Team Engstler	BMW 320si	Y	2:42.042	
107% time: 2:43.582
–	70	(Macau) Mak Ka Lok	RPM Racing Team	BMW 320si	Y	2:43.810	
–	75	(Macau) Felipe de Souza	Corsa Motorsport	Chevrolet Lacetti	Y	2:44.720	
–	23	(Hong Kong) Philip Ma	Proteam Racing	BMW 320si	Y	2:48.067	
–	76	(Macau) Kuok lo Keong	Corsa Motorsport	Chevrolet Lacetti	Y	3:30.984	

- **Bold** denotes Pole position for second race.

=== Race 1 ===
Pos.	No.	Name	Team	Car	C	Laps	Time/Retired	Grid	Points
1	2	(United Kingdom) Robert Huff	Chevrolet RML	Chevrolet Cruze 1.6T		11	35:01.903	1	25
2	1	(France) **Yvan Muller**	Chevrolet RML	Chevrolet Cruze 1.6T		11	+1.016	2	18
3	3	(Italy) Gabriele Tarquini	Lukoil-SUNRED	SUNRED SR León 1.6T		11	+6.666	3	15
4	15	(Netherlands) Tom Coronel	ROAL Motorsport	BMW 320 TC		11	+8.239	5	12
5	17	(Denmark) Michel Nykjær	SUNRED Engineering	SUNRED SR León 1.6T	Y	11	+10.778	8	10
6	12	(Germany) Franz Engstler	Liqui Moly Team Engstler	BMW 320 TC	Y	11	+11.165	9	8
7	11	(Denmark) Kristian Poulsen	Liqui Moly Team Engstler	BMW 320 TC	Y	11	+11.860	13	6
8	5	(Hungary) Norbert Michelisz	Zengő-Dension Team	BMW 320 TC	Y	11	+12.049	11	4
9	25	(Morocco) Mehdi Bennani	Proteam Racing	BMW 320 TC	Y	11	+14.149	6	2
10	74	(Spain) Pepe Oriola	SUNRED Engineering	SUNRED SR León 1.6T	Y	11	+16.940	15	1
11	20	(Spain) Javier Villa	Proteam Racing	BMW 320 TC	Y	11	+17.136	14	
12	18	(Portugal) Tiago Monteiro	SUNRED Engineering	SUNRED SR León 1.6T		11	+21.775	10	
13	51	(Hong Kong) Charles Ng	DeTeam KK Motorsport	BMW 320 TC	Y	11	+41.256	17	
14	52	(Macau) Jo Merszei	Liqui Moly Team Engstler	BMW 320si	Y	11	+46.447	19	
15	75	(Macau) Felipe de Souza	Corsa Motorsport	Chevrolet Lacetti	Y	9	+2 Laps	21	
16	28	(Canada) Gary Kwok	Wiechers-Sport	BMW 320 TC	Y	8	+3 Laps	18	
Ret	4	(Russia) Aleksei Dudukalo	Lukoil-SUNRED	SUNRED SR León 1.6T	Y	7	Race incident	16	
Ret	23	(Hong Kong) Philip Ma	Proteam Racing	BMW 320si	Y	7	Race incident	22	
Ret	70	(Macau) Mak Ka Lok	RPM Racing Team	BMW 320si	Y	7	Race incident	20	
Ret	9	(Hong Kong) Darryl O'Young	bamboo-engineering	Chevrolet Cruze 1.6T	Y	4	Race incident	4	
Ret	66	(Macau) André Couto	SUNRED Engineering	SUNRED SR León 1.6T		1	Race incident	7	
Ret	8	(Switzerland) Alain Menu	Chevrolet RML	Chevrolet Cruze 1.6T		1	Race incident	12	
DNS	30	(Sweden) Robert Dahlgren	Polestar Racing	Volvo C30 Drive		0	Did not start	–	
DNS	76	(Macau) Kuok lo Keong	Corsa Motorsport	Chevrolet Lacetti	Y	0	Did not start	–	

- **Bold** denotes Fastest lap.

=== Race 2 ===
Pos.	No.	Name	Team	Car	C	Laps	Time/Retired	Grid	Points
1	2	(United Kingdom) **Robert Huff**	Chevrolet RML	Chevrolet Cruze 1.6T		11	33:23.773	3	25
2	15	(Netherlands) Tom Coronel	ROAL Motorsport	BMW 320 TC		11	+4.680	4	18
3	1	(France) Yvan Muller	Chevrolet RML	Chevrolet Cruze 1.6T		11	+8.695	8	15
4	3	(Italy) Gabriele Tarquini	Lukoil-SUNRED	SUNRED SR León 1.6T		11	+9.047	5	10
5	17	(Denmark) Michel Nykjær	SUNRED Engineering	SUNRED SR León 1.6T	Y	11	+10.718	2	8
6	25	(Morocco) Mehdi Bennani	Proteam Racing	BMW 320 TC	Y	11	+11.066	6	6
7	12	(Germany) Franz Engstler	Liqui Moly Team Engstler	BMW 320 TC	Y	11	+12.241	1	4
8	18	(Portugal) Tiago Monteiro	SUNRED Engineering	SUNRED SR León 1.6T		11	+15.126	9	2
9	5	(Hungary) Norbert Michelisz	Zengő-Dension Team	BMW 320 TC	Y	11	+16.686	10	1
10	20	(Spain) Javier Villa	Proteam Racing	BMW 320 TC	Y	11	+16.950	12	
11	74	(Spain) Pepe Oriola	SUNRED Engineering	SUNRED SR León 1.6T	Y	11	+19.640	13	
12	9	(Hong Kong) Darryl O'Young	bamboo-engineering	Chevrolet Cruze 1.6T	Y	11	+20.088	20^{1}	
13	11	(Denmark) Kristian Poulsen	Liqui Moly Team Engstler	BMW 320 TC	Y	11	+22.457	11	
14	51	(Hong Kong) Charles Ng	DeTeam KK Motorsport	BMW 320 TC	Y	11	+39.267	15	
15	52	(Macau) Jo Merszei	Liqui Moly Team Engstler	BMW 320si	Y	11	+1:02.249	16	
16	23	(Hong Kong) Philip Ma	Proteam Racing	BMW 320si	Y	8	+3 Laps	19	
Ret	70	(Macau) Mak Ka Lok	RPM Racing Team	BMW 320si	Y	7	Race incident	17	
Ret	75	(Macau) Felipe de Souza	Corsa Motorsport	Chevrolet Lacetti	Y	6	Race incident	18	
Ret	28	(Canada) Gary Kwok	Wiechers-Sport	BMW 320 TC	Y	2	Race incident	22	
Ret	66	(Macau) André Couto	SUNRED Engineering	SUNRED SR León 1.6T		1	Engine	7	
DNS	8	(Switzerland) Alain Menu	Chevrolet RML	Chevrolet Cruze 1.6T		0	Did not start	21	
DNS	4	(Russia) Aleksei Dudukalo	Lukoil-SUNRED	SUNRED SR León 1.6T	Y	0	Did not start	14	
DNS	30	(Sweden) Robert Dahlgren	Polestar Racing	Volvo C30 Drive		0	Did not start	–	
DNS	76	(Macau) Kuok lo Keong	Corsa Motorsport	Chevrolet Lacetti	Y	0	Did not start	–	

- **Bold** denotes Fastest lap.

^1 — O'Young started from the pit lane.

== Standings after the event ==
Drivers' Championship standings

Pos	Driver	Points
1	(France) Yvan Muller	433
2	(United Kingdom) Robert Huff	430
3	(Switzerland) Alain Menu	323
4	(Netherlands) Tom Coronel	233
5	(Italy) Gabriele Tarquini	204

Yokohama Independents' Trophy standings

	Pos	Driver	Points
	1	(Denmark) Kristian Poulsen	141
1	2	(Denmark) Michel Nykjær	139
1	3	(Germany) Franz Engstler	125
2	4	(Hungary) Norbert Michelisz	124
	5	(Spain) Javier Villa	104

Manufacturers' Championship standings

Pos	Manufacturer	Points
1	(United States) Chevrolet	973
2	(Germany) BMW Customer Racing Teams	583
3	(Spain) SR Customer Racing	525
4	(Sweden) Volvo Polestar Evaluation Team	154

- Note: Only the top five positions are included for both sets of drivers' standings.
