= Speed Vegas =

Motorsports park in Las Vegas

Speed Vegas Motorsports
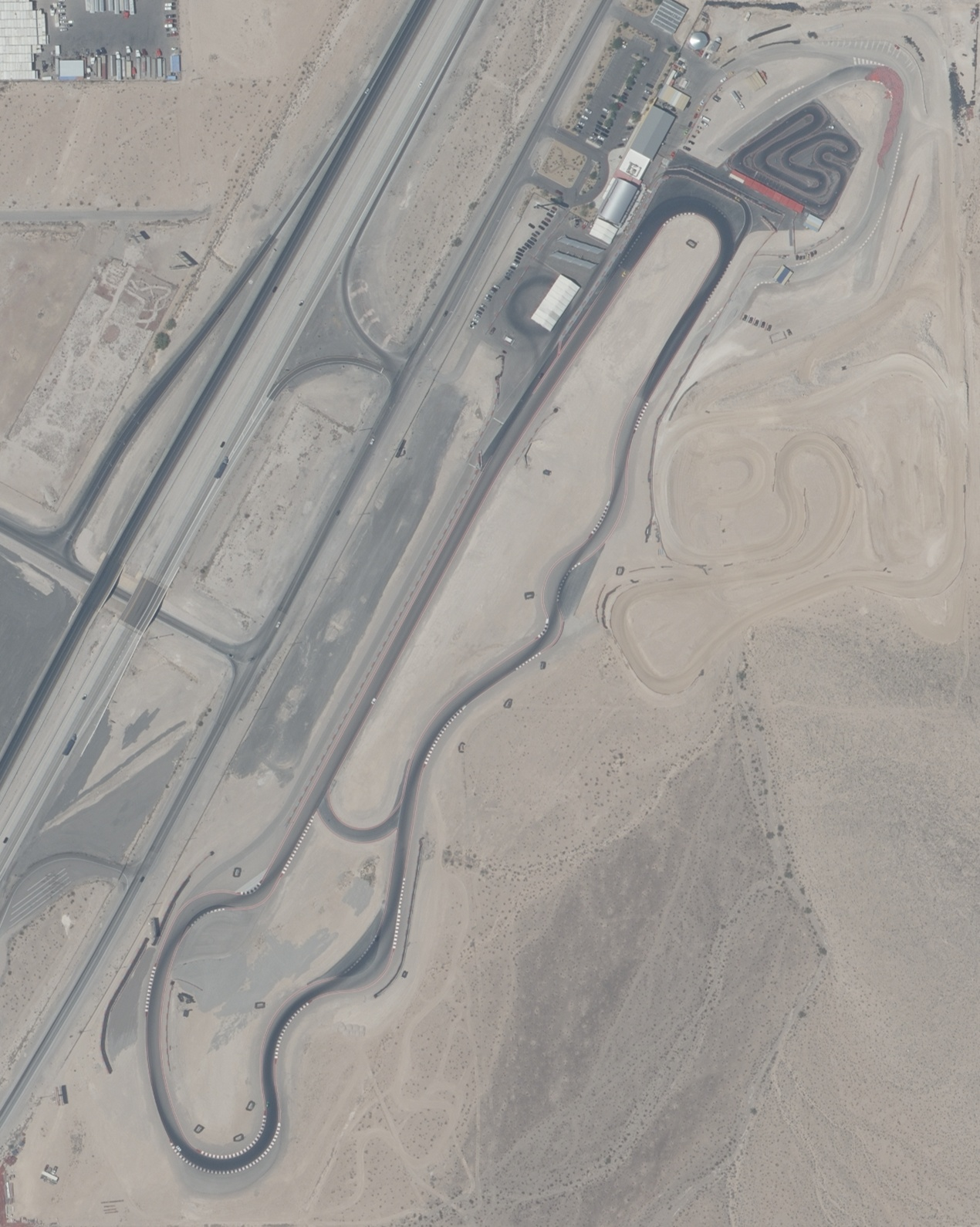
- Speed Vegas Motorsports Park 2022 aerial photo
- Key people: Romain Thievin (CEO & co-owner); Henrique Cisneros (co-owner); Mike Self (co-owner); Sam Schmidt (co-owner); David Perisset (co-owner)
- Services: Motorsports, go-karting, and off-road racing
- Divisions: Exotics Racing; Vegas Superkarts; Vegas Off-Road Experience
- Website: speedvegas.com

Speed Vegas Motorsports Park is a motorsports complex located in Las Vegas. The company operates the Exotics Racing track, which rents supercars, as well as Vegas Superkarts and Vegas Off-Road Experience.

== History ==
Speed Vegas was founded in 2016 by Aaron Fessler (CEO) and Tom Mizzone (CFO). The company operated independently until 2021, when it merged with its competitor Exotics Racing to form Speed Vegas Motorsports Park. As part of the merger, Romain Thievin of Exotics Racing joined Speed Vegas as CEO. Thievin co-owns the track with Henrique Cisneros, Mike Self and Sam Schmidt. As part of the merger process, the facility and its track were upgraded to add improved safety features, including gravel traps, asphalt run-off areas, and safety barriers.

The company hosts events and competitions like the EXR Time Trial World Challenge, which over 72,000 drivers have participated in. During the inaugural 2023 Las Vegas Grand Prix, Speed Vegas hosted the "Speed City" event. The event featured a sunset race between Lewis Hamilton and George Russell in the Mercedes-AMG coupe.

== Overview ==
The company operates the 1.2 mile Exotics Racing track, which rents supercars, as well as Vegas Superkarts and Vegas Off-Road Experience. It has a 20,000 sq. ft. welcome center, and can accommodate up to 1,000 guests. As of 2025, the company had an average of 200,000 drivers per year.

=== Exotics Racing ===
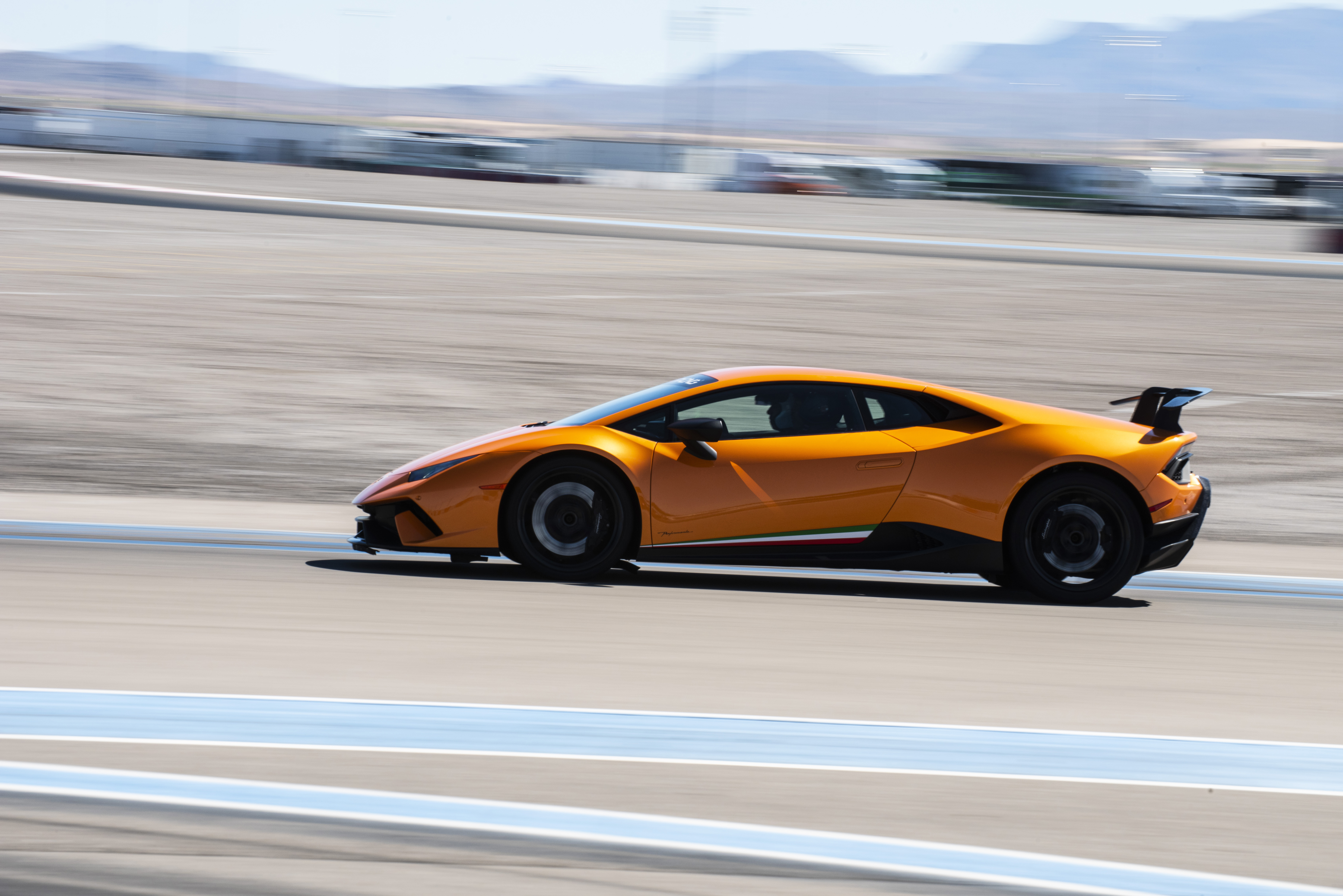
Lamborghini Huracán LP 640-4 Performante lapping the track in 2019

Exotics Racing maintains a fleet of 40 supercars from makers including Ferrari, Lamborghini, McLaren, Porsche, Audi and Mercedes, which can be rented to drive on its 1.2 mile racetrack. Drivers are accompanied by a professional guide who can coach them on how to safely reach maximum speed on the track. The track can accommodate speeds up to 130 miles per hour. The company also provides ride-along passenger experiences.

=== Vegas Superkarts ===
Vegas Superkarts operates competitive go-kart racing on an outdoor track.

=== Vegas Off-Road Experience ===
Vegas Off-Road Experience operates Baja truck racing on a 1 mile dirt track.
