= V de V Sports =

V de V Series was a motor racing organisation that owns and runs a group of international motor racing championships. Based in Paris, the majority of events are held in France although the series regularly visits Spain and Portugal and has also visited Belgium, Germany and Italy. The organisation takes its name from founder Eric van de Vyver. The van de Vyer family is involved in most aspects of running the series, having its own racing team within the series. The championships came to a halt at the end of the 2018 and V de V Sports focussed on long distance endurance races for historic GT and touring car racing, in particular centred on the 24 hour race, 2 Tours d'Horloge.

== Championships ==
V de V has hosted five separate championships;

- Challenge Monoplace, for open wheel racing cars
- Challenge Endurance Proto, for prototype sports racing cars
- Challenge Endurance GT/Tourisme, for GT sport cars and touring cars
- Challenge Funyo, a one-make series of prototype sports racing cars
- Challenge Endurance VHC, for historic GT sport cars and touring cars

The series are recognised and sanctioned by the FIA as International Series.

=== Challenge Monoplace ===
Introduced in 2010, this series caters for a wide variety of eligible open wheel racing cars, mostly second hand from other series. The majority of present cars are Formula Renault 2.0L cars built by Tatuus or Barazi-Epsilon. Formula 3, Formula Master, Formula Nissan, Formula Renault 1.6L, Formula Campus, Formula BMW, Formula Abarth and some Formula Fords are also eligible. Champions sourced from:

Year	Champion	Car
2010	(France) Philippe Haezebrouck	Tatuus FR2000 Renault
2011	(France) Simon Gachet	Tatuus FR2000 Renault
2012	(France) Hugo Blanchot	Tatuus FR2000 Renault
2013	(France) John Filippi	Tatuus N.T07 Honda
2014	(Italy) Daniele Cazzaniga	Tatuus FR 2.0-13 Renault
2015	(Switzerland) David Droux	Tatuus FR 2.0-13 Renault
2016	(Australia) Alex Peroni	Barazi-Epsilon FR2.0–10
2017	(France) Gilles Heriau	Barazi-Epsilon FR2.0–10
2018	(Argentina) Nicolás Varrone	Barazi-Epsilon FR2.0-10

=== Challenge Funyo ===
Single-marque competition with prototypes from Y.O Concept (Funyo).

Year	Champion	Car
2008	(France) Jacques Fontbonne	Funyo 4 RC
2009	(France) David Monclair	Funyo 4 RC
2010	(France) François Hériau	Funyo 4 RC
2011	(France) Marc-Antoine Dannielou	Funyo 5
2012	(France) Nicolas Cannard	Funyo 5
2013	(France) Serge Heriau	Funyo 5
2014	(France) Jean Quelet	Funyo 5
2015	(France) Romain Houllier	Funyo 5
2016	(France) Romain Houllier	Funyo SP05
2017	(France) Nicolas Cannard	
2018	(France) Aurélien Robineau	

=== Challenge Endurance Proto ===
Champions sourced from:

Year	Champion	Car
2007	(United Kingdom) Rob Croydon	Juno SSE
2008	(France) David Caussanel (France) Julien Schell	Ligier JS49 Honda
2009	(France) Philippe Mondolot (France) David Zollinger	Norma M20 F Honda
2010	(France) Philippe Mondolot (France) David Zollinger	Norma M20 F Honda
2011	(France) Philippe Mondolot (France) David Zollinger	Norma M20 F Honda Norma M20 FC Honda
2012	(France) Thomas Accary (France) Sébastien Dhouailly	Norma M20 FC Honda
2013	(France) Philippe Mondolot (France) David Zollinger	Norma M20 FC Honda
2014	(France) Vincent Capillaire	Norma M20 FC Honda
2015	(France) Thomas Accary (France) Kevin Bole-Besançon (France) Jean-Ludovic Foubert	Norma M20 FC Honda
2016	(France) Alain Ferté (France) Philippe Illiano (Spain) Ander Vilariño	Norma M20 FC Honda
2017	(France) Alain Ferté (France) Philippe Illiano (Spain) Ander Vilariño	Norma M20 FC Honda

=== Challenge Endurance GT/Tourisme ===
Champions sourced from:

Year	Champion	Car
2007	(France) Pierre Benoist (France) Jean-Paul Pagny	Porsche 996 GT3 RSR
2008	(France) Jean-Paul Pagny	Ferrari F430
2009	(France) David Loger (France) Eric Mouez	Porsche 996 GT3 RSR; Porsche 997 GT3 Cup S
2010	(France) Christophe Bourret (France) Pascal Gibon	Porsche 997 GT3 RSR
2011	(France) Anthony Pons	Porsche 997 GT3 RSR
2012	(France) Patrice Milesi	Porsche 997 GT3 RSR
2013	(France) Jean-Philippe Belloc (France) Pascal Gibon	Porsche 997 GT3-R
2014	(France) Patrice Lafargue (France) Paul Lafargue	Porsche 997 GT3-R
2015	(France) Jean-Paul Pagny (France) Thierry Perrier (France) Jean-Bernard Bouvet	Ferrari F458 Italia GT2
2016	(France) Jean-Paul Pagny (France) Thierry Perrier (France) Jean-Bernard Bouvet	Ferrari F458 Italia GT2 & Ferrari F488 GT3
2017	(France) David Loger (France) Éric Mouez	Ferrari 458 GT3
2018	(France) Jean-Paul Pagny (France) Thierry Perrier (France) Jean-Bernard Bouvet	Ferrari F488 GT3

=== Challenge Endurance VHC ===
VHC stands for Véhicule historiques de compétition. Originally there was only one overall champion. For the 2009 season, the championships for Prototype and GT cars were separated. Champions sourced from:

Year	Champion	Car		
2007	(France) Miguel Langin (France) Bernard Moreau	Porsche 911 3.0 RSR		
2008	(Switzerland) Patrick Biehler (Switzerland) Marc de Siebenthal	Porsche 911 3.0 RSR		
Year	Prototype		GT	
Year	Champion	Car	Champion	Car
2009	(France) Yann Le Calvez (France) Lionel Robert	Elva Mk.8	(France) Miguel Langin (France) Bernard Moreau	Porsche 911 3.0 RSR
2010	(France) Yann Le Calvez	Elva Mk.8	(France) Miguel Langin (France) Bernard Moreau	Porsche 911 3.0 RSR
2011	(France) Marc Alloend-Bessand (France) Sylvain Guanzini	Elva Mk.8	(France) Miguel Langin (France) Bernard Moreau	Porsche 911 3.0 RSR
2012	(France) Jean-Marc Bachelier (France) Eric Vincenot	Ford GT40	(France) Miguel Langin (France) Bernard Moreau	Porsche 911 3.0 RSR
2013	(France) Yann Le Calvez	Elva Mk.8	(Switzerland) Serge Kriknoff	Porsche 911 2.8 RSR
2014	(France) Christophe Kubryk (France) "Nelson"	March 81S	(Germany) Peter Mülder (Germany) Patrick Simon	Porsche 911 3.0 SC RS; Porsche 964 Cup
2015	(France) "John Doe"	Chevron B60	(France) Franck Thybaud	Porsche 944 Cup
2016	(Luxembourg) Alain Bazard	Ford GT40	(France) Lionel Robert (France) Olivier Huez	Lucchini SP91 Evo n°9

== Racing team ==
The V de V racing team owns a Mosler MT900 GT3 which races in the Endurance GT/Tourisme, and a TVR Griffith and Hema Porsche which race in Endurance VHC. In 2015 their primary team parked the Mosler and began racing an Audi R8 LMS in conjunction with AB Sport racing team.
