= 2013 NASCAR Whelen Euro Series =

Seasons
- ← 2012 2014 →

Locations of the European racing circuits

The 2013 NASCAR Whelen Euro Series was the fifth season and 1st with the new series denomination of stock car racing in Europe. The season started on 31 March at Nogaro, and ended on 13 October at Le Mans after twelve races at six meetings. Ander Vilariño is the defending driver's champion.

== Participants ==
Rider
(France) Hugo Bec
(India) Sailesh Bolisetti
(France) Wilfried Boucenna
(France) Bruno Cosin
(France) Joseph Cozzella
(France) Sébastien Dhouailly
(Denmark) Anders Fjordbach
(France) Frédéric Gabillon
(France) Anthony Gandon
(France) Anthony Garbarino
(France) Nicolas Gaudin
(France) Vincent Gonneau
(United Kingdom) Stuart Gough
(France) Romain Iannetta
(Switzerland) Stéphane Jaggi
(Luxembourg) Nathalie Maillet
(Sweden) Freddy Nordström
(United States) Kevin O'Connell
(Philippines) Enzo Pastor
(France) Carole Perrin
(Italy) Nicolò Rocca
(France) Guillaume Rousseau
(France) Stéphane Sabates
(France) Hugues Sour
(Belgium) François Verbist
(Spain) Ander Vilariño
(Spain) Javier Villa
(United Kingdom) Luke Wright
(Switzerland) Yann Zimmer
(United States) Giles Thornton
(United States) Rick Crawford
(Australia) Josh Burdon
(France) Caty Caly

== Schedule ==
The schedule was announced in November 2012. Dijon and Monza will be added to the series schedule, while the round at Motorland Aragón will be a six-hour, non-points endurance race.

No.	Race title	Track	Date
1	Nogaro 200	(France) Circuit Paul Armagnac, Nogaro	31 March
2	Nogaro 200	(France) Circuit Paul Armagnac, Nogaro	1 April
3	Dijon 200	(France) Dijon-Prenois, Dijon	11 May
4	Dijon 200	(France) Dijon-Prenois, Dijon	12 May
5	American SpeedFest	(United Kingdom) Brands Hatch, Swanley	8 June
6	American SpeedFest	(United Kingdom) Brands Hatch, Swanley	9 June
7	EuroRC Tours	(France) Tours Speedway, Tours	6 July
8	EuroRC Tours	(France) Tours Speedway, Tours	7 July
9	Monza Semifinals	(Italy) Autodromo Nazionale Monza, Monza	28 September
10	Monza Semifinals	(Italy) Autodromo Nazionale Monza, Monza	29 September
11	Le Mans Finals	(France) Bugatti Circuit, Le Mans	12 October
12	Le Mans Finals	(France) Bugatti Circuit, Le Mans	13 October

== Results and standings ==
=== Races ===
No.	Race	Pole position	Most laps led	Winning driver	Winning manufacturer
1	(France) Nogaro 200	(Spain) Ander Vilariño		(Spain) Ander Vilariño	Chevrolet
2	(France) Nogaro 200	(Spain) Ander Vilariño		(Spain) Ander Vilariño	Chevrolet
3	(France) Dijon 200	(Spain) Ander Vilariño		(Spain) Ander Vilariño	Chevrolet
4	(France) Dijon 200	(Spain) Ander Vilariño		(Spain) Ander Vilariño	Chevrolet
5	(United Kingdom) American SpeedFest	(Spain) Ander Vilariño		(Spain) Ander Vilariño	Chevrolet
6	(United Kingdom) American SpeedFest	(France) Frédéric Gabillon		(Spain) Ander Vilariño	Chevrolet
7	(France) EuroRC Tours	(France) Frédéric Gabillon		(France) Frédéric Gabillon	Chevrolet
8	(France) EuroRC Tours	(France) Frédéric Gabillon		(France) Frédéric Gabillon	Chevrolet
9	(Italy) Monza Semifinals	(Spain) Ander Vilariño		(Spain) Ander Vilariño	Chevrolet
10	(Italy) Monza Semifinals	(Spain) Ander Vilariño		(Switzerland) Yann Zimmer	Chevrolet
11	(France) Le Mans Finals	(France) Frédéric Gabillon		(France) Frédéric Gabillon	Chevrolet
12	(France) Le Mans Finals	(France) Frédéric Gabillon		(France) Frédéric Gabillon	Chevrolet

== See also ==
- 2013 NASCAR Sprint Cup Series
- 2013 NASCAR Nationwide Series
- 2013 NASCAR Camping World Truck Series
- 2013 NASCAR K&N Pro Series East
- 2013 NASCAR K&N Pro Series West
- 2013 NASCAR Whelen Modified Tour
- 2013 NASCAR Whelen Southern Modified Tour
- 2013 ARCA Racing Series
- 2013 NASCAR Canadian Tire Series
- 2013 NASCAR Toyota Series
