= Romain Thievin =

French racecar driver (born 1979)

- Nationality: French
- Born: 13 March 1979 (age 47) Fontainebleau, France

Racecar driver
- Years active: 1996-2013
- Teams: Exotics Racing

Romain Gerard Michel Thievin (born 13 March 1979) is a five-time French champion in car racing and also a co-presenter of FAST CLUB, a car TV show broadcasting on W9 channel in France and Belgium.

Thievin is the founder and owner of the racing school Cascadevents in France, and Exotics Racing, a racing school based at Las Vegas Motor Speedway since 2009. In 2003, he won a Taurus World Stunt Award for his work as a stunt driver in The Bourne Identity. He is currently CEO of Speed Vegas motorpark.

== Racing accomplishments ==
- 1996: Formula Renault French Championship – 7th place overall
- 1997: Citroen Saxo Cup – 10th best rookie of the year
- 1998: Renault Megane Trophy – 5th best rookie of the year
- 1999: Peugeot 106 Trophy – 2nd overall, Win at the 12 Hours of Le Mans
- 2000: Peugeot 306 Cup – Won Championship
- 2001:

Superproduction French Championship with a Peugeot 306 Maxi: won championship, 13 wins over 14 races
Peugeot 206 CC Cup: won championship and best rookie

- 2002:

Official Driver for Peugeot in the French National Championship of Touring Cars (Supertourisme), in a Peugeot 406 Silhouette: 10th overall in the “A” Championship with a “B” : Championship car
GT French Championship: 2 races in a Venturi LM400

- 2009: 5 races in the Racecar Euro Series as TV host for French car TV show FAST CLUB – 2 wins, 3 podiums
- 2011: Racecar Euro Series: Driver with the Fast Club team in the #99 Ford Mustang

Finished in 2nd place

- 2011: World Touring Racecar at Daytona International Speedway

2nd place in the Sprint GT 1 Race at Daytona International Speedway
3rd place in the Endurance Louis Chevrolet Race at Daytona International Speedway

- 2012: NASCAR Euro Series: Driver with the Exotics Racing team in the #99 Dodge Challenger. 1st runner-up of the Elite Division and Victory in Team classification with David Perisset.
- 2013: NASCAR Super Late Model division at The Bullring at Las Vegas Motor Speedway, 3rd overall, 1 win, Best rookie, 1st frenchman to win a nascar race in USA.
