= Norma M20-FC =

Sports Prototype race car

Norma M20-FC Nova Proto NP01
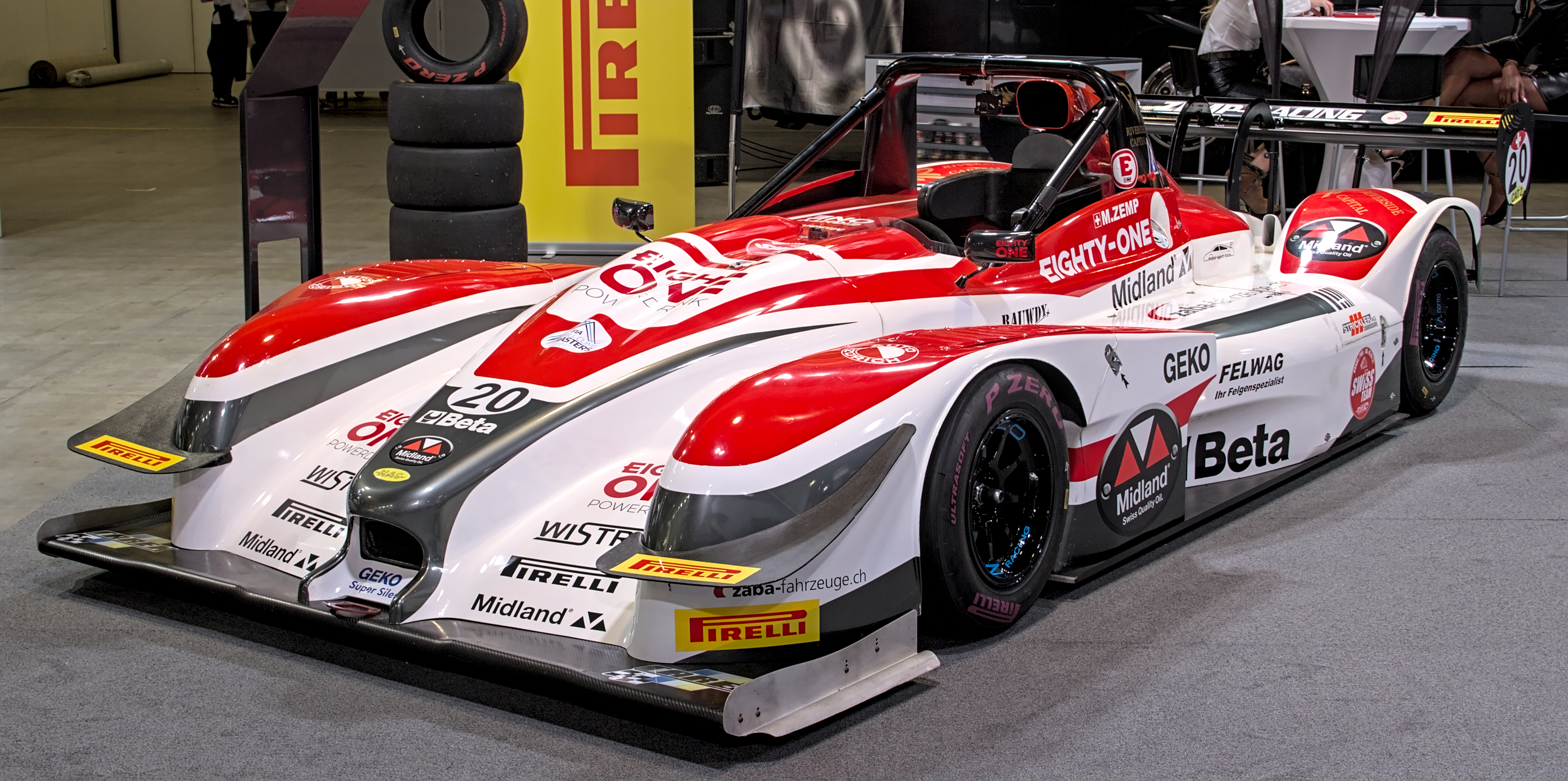
- Category: CN
- Constructor: Norma
- Designer: Norbert Santos

Technical specifications
- Chassis: Carbon fibre monocoque
- Suspension: Double wishbones, push-rod actuated coil springs over shock absorbers, anti-roll bars
- Length: 4,600–4,780 mm (181–188 in)
- Width: 1,880–1,900 mm (74–75 in)
- Height: 1,070 mm (42 in)
- Wheelbase: 2,720–2,940 mm (107–116 in)
- Engine: Judd HK 3.6 L (220 cu in) 90° DOHC V8 naturally-aspirated mid-engined BMW P65 4.0 L (240 cu in) 90° DOHC V8 naturally-aspirated mid-engined Mugen MF308 3.0 L (180 cu in) 90° DOHC V8 naturally-aspirated mid-engined Nissan 3.8 L (230 cu in) 60° DOHC V6 turbocharged mid-engined Honda K20A 2.0 L (120 cu in) DOHC I4 naturally-aspirated mid-engined Hartley Bolt 4 1.2 L (73 cu in) DOHC I4 turbocharged mid-engined Zytek-Judd KV 3.0 L (180 cu in) 90° DOHC V8 naturally-aspirated mid-engined Peugeot EP6 1.6 L (98 cu in) DOHC I4 turbocharged mid-engined longitudinally mounted
- Transmission: Sadev 6-speed sequential paddle-shift
- Power: 260–500 hp (190–370 kW)
- Weight: 475–750 kilograms (1,047–1,653 lb)

Competition history

The Norma M20-FC, now known as the Nova Proto NP01, is a sports prototype race car, designed, developed and produced by French constructor Norma, and specifically built to FIA Group CN specification, to compete in sports car racing and hillcimb events, since 2011.
