= Andrés Vilariño =

Spanish racing driver (born 1951)

Andrés Vilariño Esnaola (born 28 September 1951 in San Sebastián) is a Spanish racing driver.
