= 2017 24 Hours of Le Mans =

85th 24 Hours of Le Mans endurance race

Previous: 2016	Next: 2018
Index: Races | Winners

Layout of the Circuit de la Sarthe

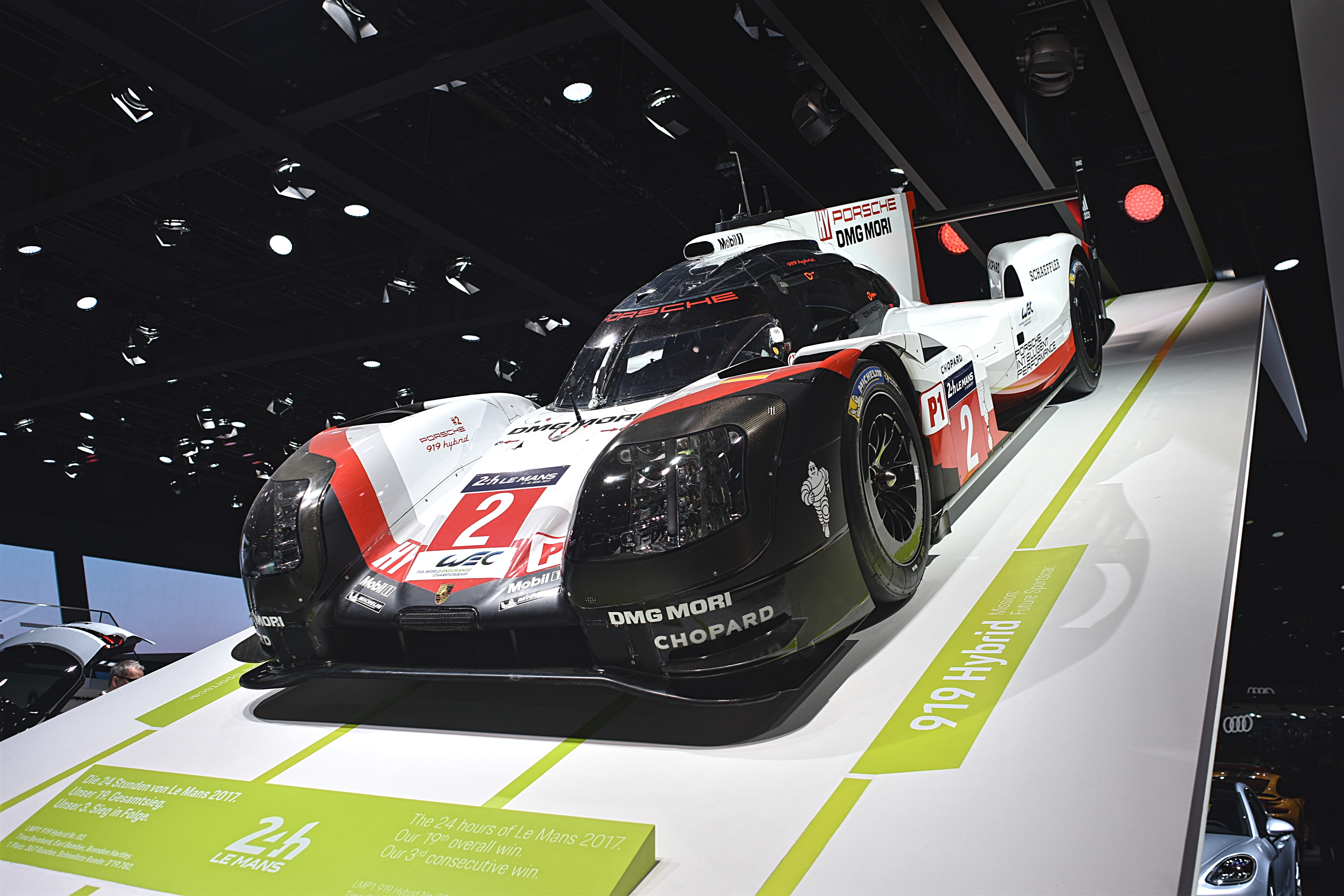
The overall-winning Porsche LMP Team No. 2 Porsche 919 Hybrid on display at the 2017 International Motor Show Germany

The 85th 24 Hours of Le Mans (French: 85^{e} 24 Heures du Mans) was a 24-hour automobile endurance race for 60 teams of three drivers in Le Mans Prototype (LMP) and Le Mans Grand Touring Endurance (LMGTE) cars. It was held from 17 to 18 June 2017 at the Circuit de la Sarthe, near Le Mans, before 258,500 spectators. The race's 85th running, organised by the Automobile Club de l'Ouest, was the third of nine rounds in the 2017 FIA World Endurance Championship. A test day was held two weeks earlier on 4 June.

Earl Bamber, Timo Bernhard, and Brendon Hartley drove a Porsche 919 Hybrid to victory, taking the lead in the final two hours. It was Bamber and Bernhard's second Le Mans victory, Hartley's first, and Porsche's 19th. Toyota's Sébastien Buemi, Anthony Davidson, and Kazuki Nakajima finished eighth in a TS050 Hybrid after starting second, and were the only other competitors in the Le Mans Prototype 1 (LMP1) field to finish the race. Oliver Jarvis, Thomas Laurent, and Ho-Pin Tung of Jackie Chan DC Racing's Oreca 07-Gibson won the Le Mans Prototype 2 (LMP2) category; they led the race for nearly two hours in the closing stages before finishing second overall. The second DC Racing entry of David Cheng, Tristan Gommendy, and Alex Brundle finished third overall, three laps ahead of the Signatech Alpine of André Negrão, Nelson Panciatici, and Pierre Ragues.

The Aston Martin Vantage shared by Jonathan Adam, Daniel Serra, and Darren Turner overtook the stricken Chevrolet Corvette C7.R of Antonio García, Jan Magnussen, and Jordan Taylor in the final two laps to win the Le Mans Grand Touring Endurance Professional (LMGTE Pro) category for Aston Martin Racing. On the final lap, a Ford GT passed the Corvette to take second place for Pipo Derani, Andy Priaulx, and Harry Tincknell. The JMW Motorsport Ferrari 488 GTE shared by Robert Smith, Will Stevens, and Dries Vanthoor won the Le Mans Grand Touring Endurance Amateur (LMGTE Am) class. Spirit of Race's Marco Cioci, Duncan Cameron, and Aaron Scott and Scuderia Corsa's Townsend Bell, Cooper MacNeil, and Bill Sweedler completed the class podium for Ferraris in second and third.

Bamber, Bernhard, and Hartley took the World Endurance Drivers' Championship lead from Buemi, Nakajima, and Davidson by 17 points. Jarvis, Laurent, and Tung moved to third after their LMP2-class victory. Derani, Priaulx, and Tincknell stayed first in the GT World Endurance Drivers' Championship, with Adam, Serra, and Turner's category win, moving them to second. Porsche overtook Toyota to lead the World Manufacturers' Championship by 28.5 points, as Ford passed Ferrari for the GT World Endurance Manufacturers' Championship lead with six races left in the season.

== Background ==
The FIA World Motor Sport Council confirmed the date for the 2017 race at a press conference held by race organiser Automobile Club de l'Ouest (ACO) on 16 June 2016 at the Musée des 24 Heures du Mans. The event was held for the 85th time at the Circuit de la Sarthe from 17 to 18 June 2017, and the third of nine scheduled rounds of the 2017 FIA World Endurance Championship (FIA WEC). The race was scheduled to avoid clashes with other major motorsport events, which occurred in 2016 (when it was held the same day as the European Grand Prix).

Before the race, Toyota drivers Anthony Davidson, Kazuki Nakajima and Sébastien Buemi led the World Endurance Drivers' Championship with 50 points – 17 more than second-place Timo Bernhard, Earl Bamber and Brendon Hartley, and another five more than Neel Jani, Nick Tandy and André Lotterer in third. Toyota led the World Manufacturers' Championship with 69.5 points, 7.5 ahead of second-place Porsche. Ford Chip Ganassi Racing's Pipo Derani, Andy Priaulx and Harry Tincknell led the GT World Endurance Drivers' Championship by two points over AF Corse's Sam Bird and Davide Rigon, and Ferrari led Ford by seven points in the GT World Endurance Manufacturers' Championship.

== Regulation and circuit changes ==
Following the 2016 race, when the lead car failed to complete the final lap and was eventually not classified in the final results, the standards for car classification were changed by the ACO. Instead of the mandatory six minutes for the race's final lap, penalties were assessed on a graduated scale for any lap exceeding six minutes. Failure to complete the race's final lap in under fifteen minutes no longer led to a car being classified.

The event's slow-zone system was also revised, with nine dedicated slow zones around the circuit. Previously, individual marshal posts were used to mark the beginning and end of slow zones. The dedicated zones were located so the beginning of 80 km/h (50 mph) is in a slow section of the circuit; previous slow zones could begin in areas of the track where cars were required to slow down from high speeds, causing accidents.

The circuit was modified from the Porsche Curves to the Ford Chicane. The run-off area where the last right-hand turn goes into the left-hand corner, which begins the Corvette corner, was widened, with the barrier at the Porsche Curves moved further back. The angle of the wall at the left-hand entry to the short straight before the Ford Chicane was also altered. The Le Mans Prototype 2 (LMP2) category was revamped with the introduction of a single specification engine from Gibson, with increased power output compared to 2016 LMP2 cars. Cockpit and chassis designs mimicked the Le Mans Prototype 1 (LMP1) regulations for safety. The four approved chassis manufacturers were Dallara, Ligier, Oreca and Riley.

== Entries ==
=== Automatic invitations ===
Teams which won their class in the 2016 24 Hours of Le Mans or won championships in the European Le Mans Series (ELMS), Asian Le Mans Series (ALMS) and GT3 Le Mans Cup (GT3 LMC) earned automatic invitations. The 2016 ELMS Le Mans Grand Touring Endurance (LMGTE) championship runner-up received an automatic invitation. The ACO gave two participants selected from the IMSA SportsCar Championship (IMSA) automatic entries, regardless of performance or category. When teams received invitations, they were allowed to change cars (but not their category) from the previous year. The LMGTE-class invitations from the ELMS and ALMS allowed a choice between the Pro and Am categories. ELMS' Le Mans Prototype 3 (LMP3) champion was required to field an entry in LMP2, and the 2016–17 ALMS LMP3 champion could choose between LMP2 or LMGTE Am. The 2016 GT3 LMC champions were limited to the LMGTE Am category. The ACO issued its initial list of automatic entries on 23 January 2017.

Automatic entries for the 2017 24 Hours of Le Mans
Reason invited	LMP1	LMP2	LMGTE Pro	LMGTE Am
1st in the 24 Hours of Le Mans	(Germany) Porsche Team	(France) Signatech Alpine	(United States) Ford Chip Ganassi Team USA	(United States) Scuderia Corsa
1st in the European Le Mans Series (LMP2 and LMGTE)		(Russia) G-Drive Racing	(United Kingdom) Aston Martin Racing	
2nd in the European Le Mans Series (LMGTE)			(United Kingdom) JMW Motorsport	
1st in the European Le Mans Series (LMP3)		(United States) United Autosports		
IMSA SportsCar Championship at-large entries		(United States) Keating Motorsport		(United States) Scuderia Corsa
1st in the Asian Le Mans Series (LMP2 and GT)		(Portugal) Algarve Pro Racing	(Hong Kong) DH Racing	
1st in the Asian Le Mans Series (LMP3)		(United Kingdom) Tockwith Motorsports	– or –	(United Kingdom) Tockwith Motorsports
1st in the GT3 Le Mans Cup				(United Kingdom) TF Sport

=== Entry list and reserves ===
In conjunction with announcing entries for the 2017 FIA WEC and the ELMS seasons, the ACO announced the full 60-car entry list for Le Mans and two reserves. In addition to the 28 guaranteed WEC entries, 13 entries came from the ELMS, six from IMSA and eleven from the ALMS; the rest of the field was filled with one-off entries only competing at Le Mans. The ACO initially named two cars to the reserve list; RLR MSport later withdrew their LMP2 Ligier, and a fourth entry (from Proton Competition) was not promoted to the race. Audi Sport Team Joest's withdrawal from LMP1 reduced the class to six entries for the race.

=== Garage 56 ===
The Garage 56 concept, which began in 2012 to test new technology at Le Mans, was to be continued by the ACO. Welter Racing intended to enter a three-cylinder 1.2 L (0.26 imp gal; 0.32 US gal) prototype vehicle powered by biomethane fuel, stored in cryogenic tanks which could withstand very low temperatures, to concentrate and maximise fuel volume. Due to funding issues, the car was not entered in the race.

== Pre-race balance of performance changes ==
The ACO and the FIA altered the balance of performance (BoP) in the two LMGTE categories in an attempt to eliminate sandbagging. To reduce performance, the Ford GT received a 20 kg (44 lb) minimum weight increase and reduced turbocharger boost across all RPM levels. The Aston Martin Vantage was made 10 kg (22 lb) heavier with an air restrictor elongated by 0.4 mm (0.016 in), and the Chevrolet Corvette C7.R had 1 L (0.22 imp gal; 0.26 US gal) less fuel capacity and its air restrictor lengthened by 0.7 mm (0.028 in). Porsche's 911 RSR received a minimum weight increase of 10 kg (22 lb), and its air restrictor was lengthened by 0.1 mm (0.0039 in). The LMGTE Am-class Porsche 911 RSR's ballast was increased by 10 kg (22 lb); the Ferrari 488 GTE and Aston Martin Vantage's ballasts were decreased by 10 kg (22 lb) and 5 kg (11 lb), respectively. All three cars had minor power and restrictor adjustments.

== Testing ==
On 4 June, the circuit held two mandatory four-hour sessions as part of a pre-Le Mans testing day. The morning session, held on a dirty track with lap times improving throughout, was led by pre-race favourite Toyota; Nakajima's No. 8 car lapped at 3:20.778. The second Toyota of Kamui Kobayashi was almost seven-tenths of a second slower, and José María López's No. 9 car was third. Porsche were more than two seconds slower than Toyota, and completed the LMP1 field with Bernhard fourth and Lotterer fifth. Oreca 07s led LMP2 with 13 cars leading the time sheets, led by André Negrão's No. 36 Signatech Alpine – the sole driver to lap below 3 minutes 30 seconds with a 3:29.809 lap, ahead of Rebellion and Graff. Corvette led LMGTE Pro with Jan Magnussen's lap of 3:55.726, followed by Patrick Pilet's No. 91 Porsche and the second Corvette of Oliver Gavin. Matteo Cairoli's No. 77 Porsche led LMGTE Am from Andrea Bertolini's DH Racing Ferrari.

Toyota led the second session with Kobayashi's 3:18.132 lap, followed by Buemi and López. Porsche remained slower than Toyota, with their best lap coming from Bamber's No. 2 car, followed by Jani's No. 1 entry. Nelson Panciatici's No. 35 Signatech Alpine lapped faster in LMP2 than Jean-Éric Vergne's No. 24 Manor and Alex Brundle's No. 37 Jackie Chan DC Racing entry to lead the sole LMP1 privateer (Dominik Kraihamer's No. 4 ByKolles Racing ENSO CLM P1/01). Gavin missed 91 minutes due to a mid-session engine change but set the day's best LMGTE Pro lap (3:54.701) towards the end of the test, beating Frédéric Makowiecki's No. 92 Porsche. Aston Martin led LMGTE Am with Pedro Lamy's 3:58.250 lap from Fernando Rees' Larbre Compétition Corvette. Erik Maris' No. 33 Eurasia Motorsport Ligier JS P217 stopped the session by becoming stranded in the gravel trap in the Dunlop Curves. Paul-Loup Chatin's No. 17 IDEC Sport Ligier and Jan Lammers's Racing Team Nederland Dallara collided at the second Mulsanne Chicane, but both continued without major damage. The session ended less than 15 minutes early when Roberto González's No. 25 Manor laid oil on the track and stopped.

=== Post-testing balance of performance changes ===
After testing, the FIA re-adjusted the BoP. The LMGTE Pro-category Corvettes had their performance lowered with an air-restrictor reduction. The Aston Martins, Ferraris, Fords, and Porsches received fuel-capacity increases to equalise refuelling times and stint lengths. The LMGTE Am-class Aston Martin and Ferraris increased their fuel capacity, with the Ferraris receiving turbocharger boost pressure increases.

== Practice ==
Practice was held on 14 June, with all 60 cars on the circuit for four hours in hot and sunny weather. Toyota led from the start once again, with Nicolas Lapierre setting the early pace and leading for most of the session until Bamber went faster. Kobayashi improved until Jani's lap of 3:20.362 seconds with five minutes remaining led the session. Alex Lynn's No. 26 G-Drive Racing car led LMP2 with less than 40 minutes left, with a 3:30.363 lap from Nelson Piquet Jr.'s No. 13 Rebellion. Bruno Senna's sister No. 31 Rebellion was third. LMGTE Pro was led by Aston Martins and Corvettes from the start until Bird's No. 71 AF Corse Ferrari lapped fastest at 3:54.832. Darren Turner's No. 97 Aston Martin, and James Calado's second AF Corse car were second and third, respectively. Over three DH Racing Ferraris, Lamy's No. 98 Aston Martin was the fastest LMGTE Am car. After Christian Philippon's Larbre Compétition Corvette left the Porsche Curves off the track and hit the tyre barrier, the safety cars were needed for 75 minutes. Stéphane Lémeret's No. 88 Proton Porsche scraped a barrier through the Porsche Curves, but continued to the pit lane for repairs. Roberto Lacorte slid the Cetilar Villorba Corse Dallara into the Mulsanne corner gravel trap and abandoned the car.

== Qualifying ==
Beginning late Wednesday night in clear conditions, the first of three qualifying sessions to set the race's starting order by the fastest lap times set by each team's quickest driver commenced. Due to a significant practice incident in the first Road to Le Mans race, the start was delayed by 20 minutes for barrier repairs at the Porsche Curves. Slow zones and yellow flags limited the amount of quick running, and the rapidly-cooling track meant that the best chance to set the fastest lap times was missed. The session's first timed laps saw Porsche lead early on with a benchmark effort from Jani, followed by Bernhard's 3:19.710 lap. Fifteen minutes later, Kobayashi had no slower traffic impeding him and took provisional pole position with a 3:18.793 lap. Nakajima was six-tenths of a second behind in second, and Bernhard was a provisional third. Lapierre was the slowest of the three Toyotas in fourth, and Jani was fifth. Kraihamer completed the LMP1 field with a lap that was ten seconds slower than Kobayashi's time but clear of the LMP2 field.

Matthieu Vaxivière put TDS Racing's Oreca on provisional pole in LMP2 with a 3:29.333 lap set late in the session. He was half-a-second clear of Senna, who held the class pole until Vaxivière's lap. Vitaly Petrov's No. 25 Manor was third-fastest, with teammate Vergne fourth. Eric Trouillet, in the No. 39 Graff Oreca, caused the session's first yellow flag when he struck the barriers leaving the second Mulsanne Chicane. The No. 27 SMP Racing Dallara caused further disruption when it hit the barriers and had a quickly-extinguished fire. Aston Martin led the LMGTE categories, with Nicki Thiim's No. 95 car quickest at 3:52.117; Mathias Lauda was the fastest Amateur-class entry with a 3:55.134 lap. Risi Competizione's No. 82 Ferrari 488 was 11th amongst the LMGTEs before ACO officials disallowed their fastest laps for violating parc fermé regulations by handling the tyres after the session.

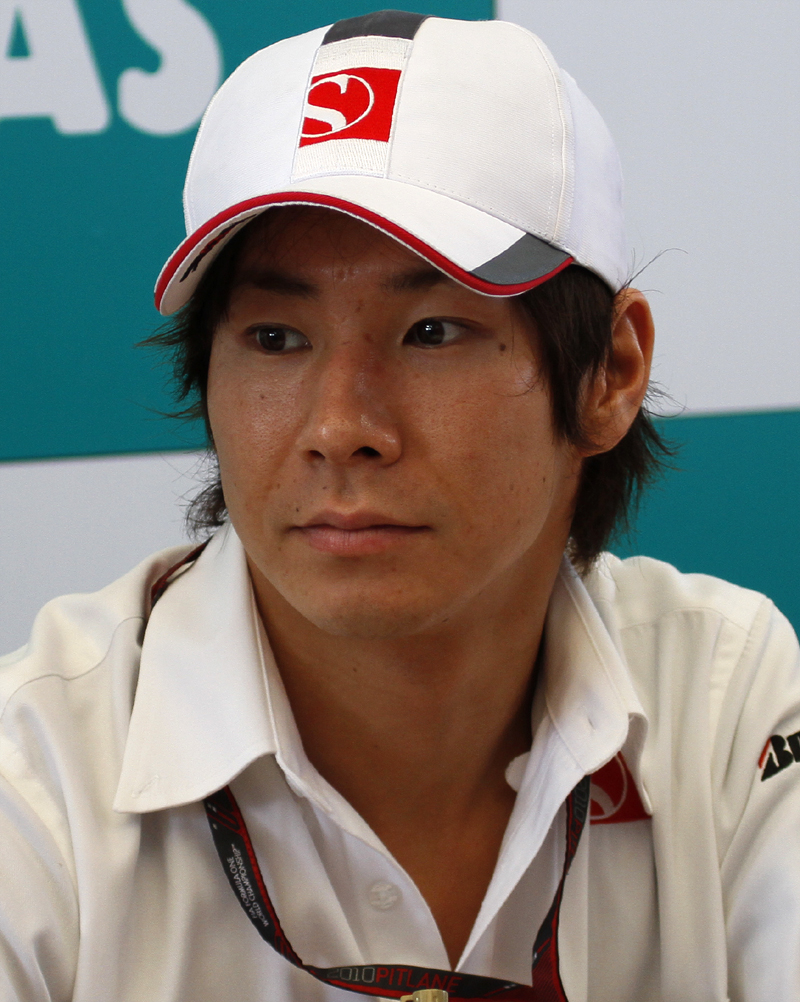
Kamui Kobayashi (pictured in 2010) broke Neel Jani's 2015 lap record to clinch Toyota's third pole position at Le Mans.

Thursday's first qualifying session began with a stoppage for a crash. Maris spun and crashed his No. 33 car against the outside barriers leaving the first Mulsanne Chicane 17 minutes in. He was unhurt, but was transported to the medical centre for a precautionary check-up; this meant that the organisers rescheduled the second qualifying to end at 21:30 Central European Summer Time (CEST) (UTC+02:00). When it restarted, Kobayashi exited the pit lane early; aided by tailwinds on the Mulsanne Straight and headwinds through the Porsche Curves, he reset the track lap record to 3:14.791. (Note: Kobayashi's time was nearly two seconds faster than the qualifying lap record set in 2015 on the current 13.629-kilometre (8.469 mi) version of the Circuit de la Sarthe and averaged 251.882 km/h (156.512 mph) to beat Hans-Joachim Stuck's 1985 qualifying run.) The No. 8 Toyota stopped leaving the second Mulsanne Chicane with an engine oil-supply problem which required an engine change. The Toyota returned to the track, but fell to fourth as Buemi could not lap faster. Jani and Bernhard in the two Porsches lapped quicker and moved to second and third. Yuji Kunimoto also improved the No. 9 Toyota's best lap, but fell to fifth.

Petrov's Manor set a new LMP2 class lap record of 3:25.549, more than a second faster than rookie Thomas Laurent in DC's No. 38 entry and Vergne's second Manor; Petrov demoted the ByKolles car to seventh overall. The LMGTE categories had some changes, with Aston Martin remaining the Pro leader; Jonathan Adam bettered Thiim's first session lap, with Calado improving to second. Euan Hankey became the provisional LMGTE Am pole-sitter before Will Stevens went faster to take the class pole. Timothé Buret lost control of the No. 23 Panis Barthez Competition Ligier on the grass and was stranded in a gravel trap going into Tertre Rouge corner after striking the barrier with half-an-hour left in qualifying.

As temperatures cooled for the final session, more than half the field improved their fastest laps but Kobayashi's time was not bested. He took Toyota's third pole position at Le Mans and their first since 2014. Nakajima lapped more than two seconds faster, putting the No. 8 Toyota alongside the sister No. 7 car. Porsche failed to improve from the second session, finishing third and fourth. Hartley slowed and stopped the No. 2 Porsche at Indianapolis corner due to a rising oil temperature. He abandoned the car after failing to return to the pit lane on hybrid power. Lapierre improved early on to go fifth. Oliver Webb used clear air to return the ByKolles car to sixth overall. Lynn reset the LMP2 lap record early on by 11.3 seconds over the 2016 time, demoting the No. 25 Manor Oreca to second. Ho-Pin Tung's No. 38 DC car took third, battling with Senna for the position. The Oreca chassis, as well as the variant Alpine chassis, secured the first nine positions in LMP2; the Dallara of SMP Racing was the fastest of the other chassis, in tenth place.

Aston Martin led LMGTE Pro, with Richie Stanaway setting a new class record before Turner improved with a 3:50.837 lap for Aston Martin's first class pole since 2015. Calado separated the two cars in the closing minutes, and Bird came within 0.048 seconds of Stanaway. All five of LMGTE Pro's manufacturers were within a second of Turner's lap, with the fastest Ford in fifth courtesy of Ryan Briscoe, Antonio García sixth for Corvette, and Porsche seventh through Michael Christensen. The LMGTE Am lead changed with Rees earning Larbre Compétition's first class pole in ten years with a 3:52.843 lap, almost four-tenths of a second clear of Lamy's No. 98 Aston Martin and Townsend Bell's No. 62 Scuderia Corsa Ferrari.

=== Post-qualifying ===
After qualifying, the FIA imposed an 8-kilogram (18 lb) BoP ballast decrease on the LMGTE Am-category Porsches after they were 9 km/h (5.6 mph) slower on the straight; Porsche had requested a longer air restrictor for better performance.

=== Qualifying results ===
Provisional pole positions in each class are denoted in bold. The fastest time set by each entry is denoted with a gray background.

Final qualifying classification
Pos.	Class	No.	Team	Qualifying 1	Qualifying 2	Qualifying 3	Gap	Grid
1	**LMP1**	**7**	**Toyota Gazoo Racing**	**3:18.793**	**3:14.791**	3:19.928		1
2	LMP1	8	Toyota Gazoo Racing	3:19.431	No time	**3:17.128**	+2.337	2
3	LMP1	1	Porsche LMP Team	3:21.165	3:17.259	3:18.210	+2.468	3
4	LMP1	2	Porsche LMP Team	3:19.710	3:18.067	3:20.154	+3.276	4
5	LMP1	9	Toyota Gazoo Racing	3:19.958	3:19.889	3:18.625	+3.834	5
6	LMP1	4	ByKolles Racing Team	3:28.887	3:26.026	3:24.170	+9.379	6
7	**LMP2**	**26**	**G-Drive Racing**	3:31.945	3:28.580	**3:25.352**	**+10.561**	7
8	LMP2	25	CEFC Manor TRS Racing	3:30.502	**3:25.549**	3:26.521	+10.758	8
9	LMP2	38	Jackie Chan DC Racing	3:31.024	3:26.776	3:25.911	+11.120	9
10	LMP2	31	Vaillante Rebellion	3:29.851	3:27.564	3:26.736	+11.945	10
11	LMP2	13	Vaillante Rebellion	3:31.636	3:27.071	3:26.811	+12.020	11
12	LMP2	24	CEFC Manor TRS Racing	3:30.847	3:26.871	3:27.359	+12.080	12
13	LMP2	28	TDS Racing	**3:29.333**	3:31.085	3:27.108	+12.317	13
14	LMP2	35	Signatech Alpine Matmut	3:31.439	3:29.328	3:27.517	+12.726	14
15	LMP2	37	Jackie Chan DC Racing	3:41.393	3:28.432	3:27.535	+12.744	15
16	LMP2	27	SMP Racing	3:34.407	3:30.262	3:27.782	+12.991	16
17	LMP2	36	Signatech Alpine Matmut	3:31.065	3:28.856	3:28.051	+13.260	17
18	LMP2	39	Graff	3:32.987	3:36.128	3:28.368	+13.577	18
19	LMP2	40	Graff	3:32.477	3:29.396	3:28.891	+14.100	19
20	LMP2	22	G-Drive Racing	3:31.963	3:28.937	3:30.313	+14.146	20
21	LMP2	32	United Autosports	3:34.166	3:30.693	3:29.151	+14.360	21
22	LMP2	21	DragonSpeed – 10 Star	3:34.046	3:30.396	3:29.777	+14.986	22
23	LMP2	29	Racing Team Nederland	3:33.796	3:31.766	3:29.976	+15.185	23
24	LMP2	47	Cetilar Villorba Corse	3:34.846	3:30.014	3:33.412	+15.223	24
25	LMP2	45	Algarve Pro Racing	3:37.814	3:30.164	3:32.425	+15.373	25
26	LMP2	23	Panis Barthez Competition	3:35.559	3:31.346	3:32.888	+16.555	26
27	LMP2	34	Tockwith Motorsports	3:41.628	3:33.739	3:32.536	+17.745	27
28	LMP2	49	ARC Bratislava	3:37.226	3:33.921	No time	+19.130	28
29	LMP2	17	IDEC Sport Racing	3:40.162	3:36.362	3:36.230	+21.439	29
30	LMP2	43	Keating Motorsport	3:40.813	3:37.350	3:37.007	+22.216	30
31	LMP2	33	Eurasia Motorsport	3:42.660	3:42.916	No time	+27.869	31
32	**LMGTE Pro**	**97**	**Aston Martin Racing**	3:53.296	**3:51.860**	**3:50.837**	**+36.046**	32
33	LMGTE Pro	51	AF Corse	3:53.123	3:52.087	3:51.028	+36.237	33
34	LMGTE Pro	95	Aston Martin Racing	**3:52.117**	3:52.525	3:51.038	+36.247	34
35	LMGTE Pro	71	AF Corse	3:52.235	3:52.903	3:51.086	+36.295	35
36	LMGTE Pro	69	Ford Chip Ganassi Team USA	3:55.553	3:52.496	3:51.232	+36.441	36
37	LMGTE Pro	63	Corvette Racing – GM	3:54.847	3:52.886	3:51.484	+36.693	37
38	LMGTE Pro	92	Porsche GT Team	3:54.243	3:52.177	3:51.847	+37.056	38
39	LMGTE Pro	66	Ford Chip Ganassi Team UK	3:55.803	3:52.558	3:51.991	+37.200	39
40	LMGTE Pro	67	Ford Chip Ganassi Team UK	3:54.118	3:53.059	3:52.008	+37.217	40
41	LMGTE Pro	64	Corvette Racing – GM	3:54.876	3:52.391	3:52.017	+37.226	41
42	LMGTE Pro	82	Risi Competizione	No time (Note: The No. 82 Risi Ferrari had its lap times from the Qualifying 1 session deleted for the team breaking parc fermé regulations by handling the tires after the session.)	3:52.138	3:54.129	+37.347	42
43	LMGTE Pro	68	Ford Chip Ganassi Team USA	3:55.059	3:52.626	3:52.178	+37.387	43
44	LMGTE Pro	91	Porsche GT Team	3:54.564	3:52.593	3:53.807	+37.802	44
45	**LMGTE Am**	**50**	**Larbre Compétition**	3:56.259	3:54.559	**3:52.843**	**+38.052**	45
46	LMGTE Am	98	Aston Martin Racing	**3:55.134**	3:54.456	3:53.233	+38.442	46
47	LMGTE Am	62	Scuderia Corsa	3:57.267	3:54.576	3:53.312	+38.521	47
48	LMGTE Am	77	Dempsey-Proton Racing	3:55.692	3:54.890	3:53.381	+38.590	48
49	LMGTE Am	55	Spirit of Race	4:01.098	3:54.941	3:53.641	+38.850	49
50	LMGTE Am	84	JMW Motorsport	3:56.890	**3:53.981**	3:53.977	+39.186	50
51	LMGTE Am	83	DH Racing	3:55.966	3:54.813	3:54.088	+39.297	51
52	LMGTE Am	90	TF Sport	3:55.953	3:54.319	3:54.551	+39.528	52
53	LMGTE Am	99	Beechdean AMR	3:57.463	3:55.046	3:54.328	+39.537	53
54	LMGTE Am	93	Proton Competition	3:58.196	3:54.621	3:59.046	+39.830	54
55	LMGTE Am	61	Clearwater Racing	3:56.333	3:55.995	3:54.955	+40.164	55
56	LMGTE Am	60	Clearwater Racing	3:57.321	4:02.436	3:54.994	+40.203	56
57	LMGTE Am	88	Proton Competition	3:56.507	3:55.468	4:00.323	+40.677	57
58	LMGTE Am	54	Spirit of Race	3:58.904	3:57.005	3:56.301	+41.510	58
59	LMGTE Am	86	Gulf Racing UK	3:58.427	No time	3:56.469	+41.678	59
60	LMGTE Am	65	Scuderia Corsa	3:58.249	3:59.842	No time	+43.458	60

== Warm-up ==
A 45-minute warm-up session was held on Saturday morning. Nakajima's No. 8 Toyota set the fastest lap at 3:18.308; Kobayashi's sister Toyota was three-tenths of a second slower in second. The best-placed Porsche was Tandy's No. 1 car in third, having led for most of the session. Kunimoto and Hartley were fourth and fifth, respectively. Lynn set the fastest LMP2 lap at 3:27.096. Briscoe's No. 69 Ford led in LMGTE Pro, with Bertolini's No. 83 DH Racing Ferrari fastest in LMGTE Am by over a second. Paul Lafargue oversteered the No. 17 IDEC car in the Porsche Curves, made contact with the barriers before stopping in the gravel trap and returned to the pit lane for repairs.

== Race ==
=== Start to evening ===
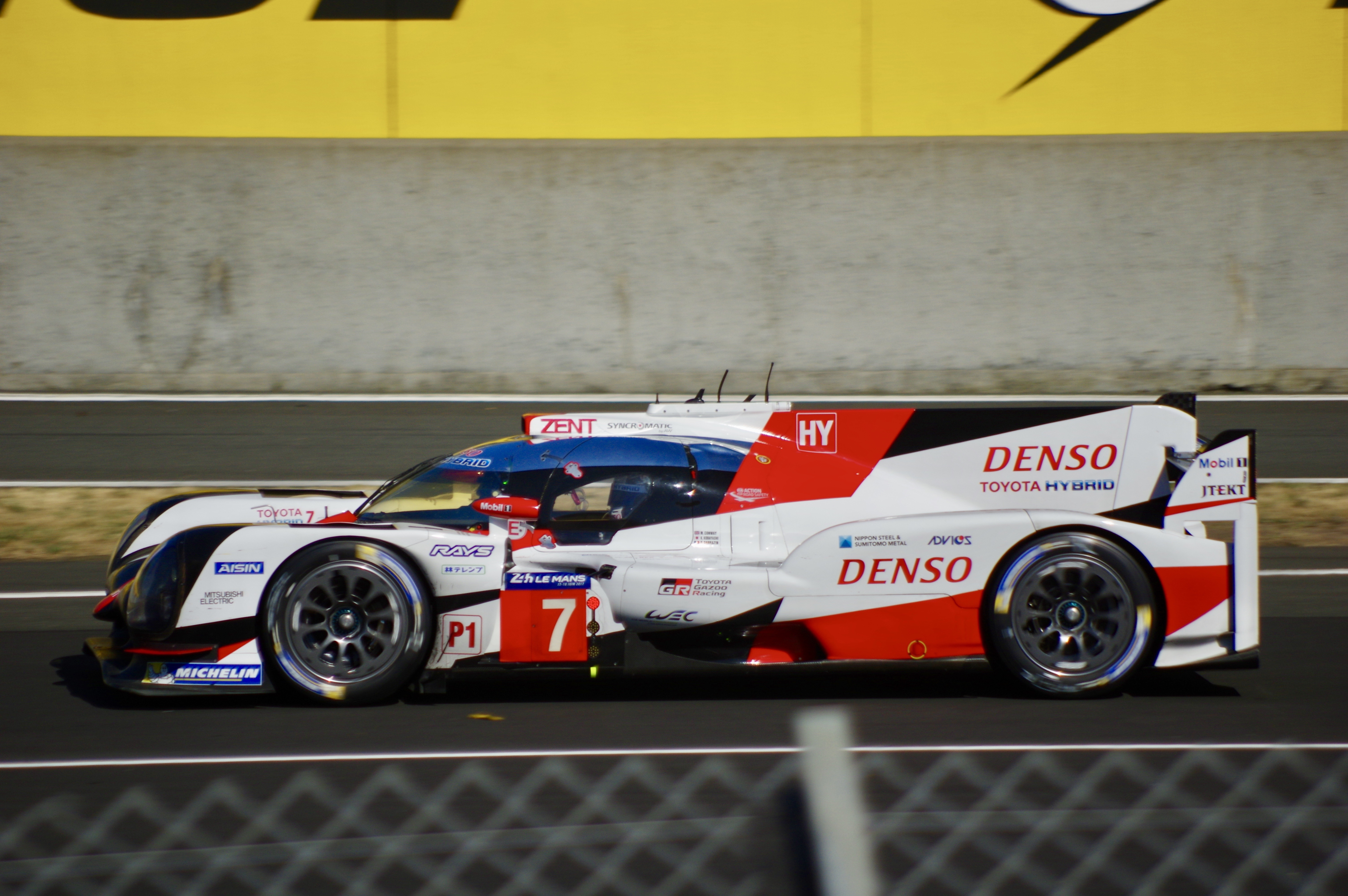
The No. 7 Toyota TS050 Hybrid led most of the first ten hours before retiring with clutch trouble.

The weather was hot, with an air temperature of 19 to 32 °C (66 to 90 °F); the track temperature ranged from 27 to 38 °C (81 to 100 °F). Formula One Group's chair and chief executive Chase Carey waved the French tricolour to begin the race before 258,500 spectators with a rolling start at 15:00 local time. Mike Conway maintained the No. 7 Toyota's pole-position advantage for most of the first hour, before Buemi overtook him on the outside into Indianapolis turn for the lead after Conway made a braking error at the Dunlop Esses. The first retirement occurred during the opening hour when Webb's No. 4 ByKolles car hit the wall at Tertre Rouge corner after suffering a front-left puncture, damaging both its front bodywork and engine. Thiim put the No. 95 Aston Martin in the LMGTE Pro lead at the end of the hour after Alessandro Pier Guidi moved the No. 51 AF Corse Ferrari to the category lead for the first two laps before dropping to third in class.

Rees briefly passed Hand's No. 68 LMGTE Pro-class Ford, and Rees led the LMGTE Am field until Bell's No. 62 Scuderia Corsa Ferrari took the lead due to a faster pit stop. As the class pole-sitter No. 26 G-Drive Oreca of Roman Rusinov dropped to 14th at the start, the LMP2 lead became a multi-team battle between the No. 38 DC car and the Nos. 13 and 31 Rebellion Racing teams between pit stop cycles. Rusinov caught Khaled Al Qubaisi's No. 88 Proton Porsche and lapped him in the middle of the Porsche Curves before both drivers crashed into the SAFER barrier at high speed. Although both cars could be driven to the pit lane, they had severe damage and were retired. The accident triggered the race's first localised slow-zone procedure to enable repairs to the barrier. On the Mulsanne Straight, Conway retook the overall lead in the No. 7 Toyota when his teammate (Buemi, in the sister No. 8 car) went wide at Mulsanne turn.

Laurent's No. 38 DC car was gaining on the two LMP2-leading Rebellion cars when its rear snapped out and he crashed lightly against the barrier at Indianapolis corner. Laurent entered the pit lane for new front bodywork, but the car lost two and a half minutes and fell to sixth place. After Marco Sørensen relieved Thiim in the No. 95 Aston Martin, he was slowed by a left-rear puncture from debris at Tertre Rouge corner. Sørensen relinquished the LMGTE Pro lead to Daniel Serra's sister No. 97 Aston Martin, with the No. 67 Ford in second. After three-and-a-half hours, Bamber's No. 2 Porsche was forced to the garage for 65 minutes – and 18 laps – to fix a failed front-axle hybrid harvesting motor which required multiple components (including the motor generator unit). Tandy's No. 1 Porsche overtook Davidson's No. 8 Toyota for second overall after a pit-stop cycle, challenging the No. 7 Toyota for the lead.

Vaxivière unsettled the front of his TDS Racing Oreca while braking for the first Mulsanne chicane. He moved left towards Pierre Kaffer's unseen No. 82 Risi Ferrari, which he was lapping in traffic. In the ensuing collision, Kaffer hit the Armco barrier at high speed, forcing the No. 82 car stopped in the run-off area to retire. Kaffer was unhurt, but a lengthy slow zone was imposed by race officials to allow for barrier repairs; Vaxivière received a seven-minute stop-and-go penalty for the accident. Following several incidents that left gravel on the circuit, the slow zone was extended past the Dunlop chicane to the Tetre Rouge turn. The slowdown brought the leading cars together and Senna extend the No. 31 LMP2 Rebellion Oreca car's lead to over 90 seconds over his teammate, Piquet, in the second-place No. 13 entry. Tung's recovering No. 38 DC car was third in class, passing Pierre Ragues' No. 35 Signatech Alpine. Although Kunimoto had to make an unscheduled pit stop to repair a loose right-side door, the No. 9 Toyota remained fourth.

=== Night to dawn ===
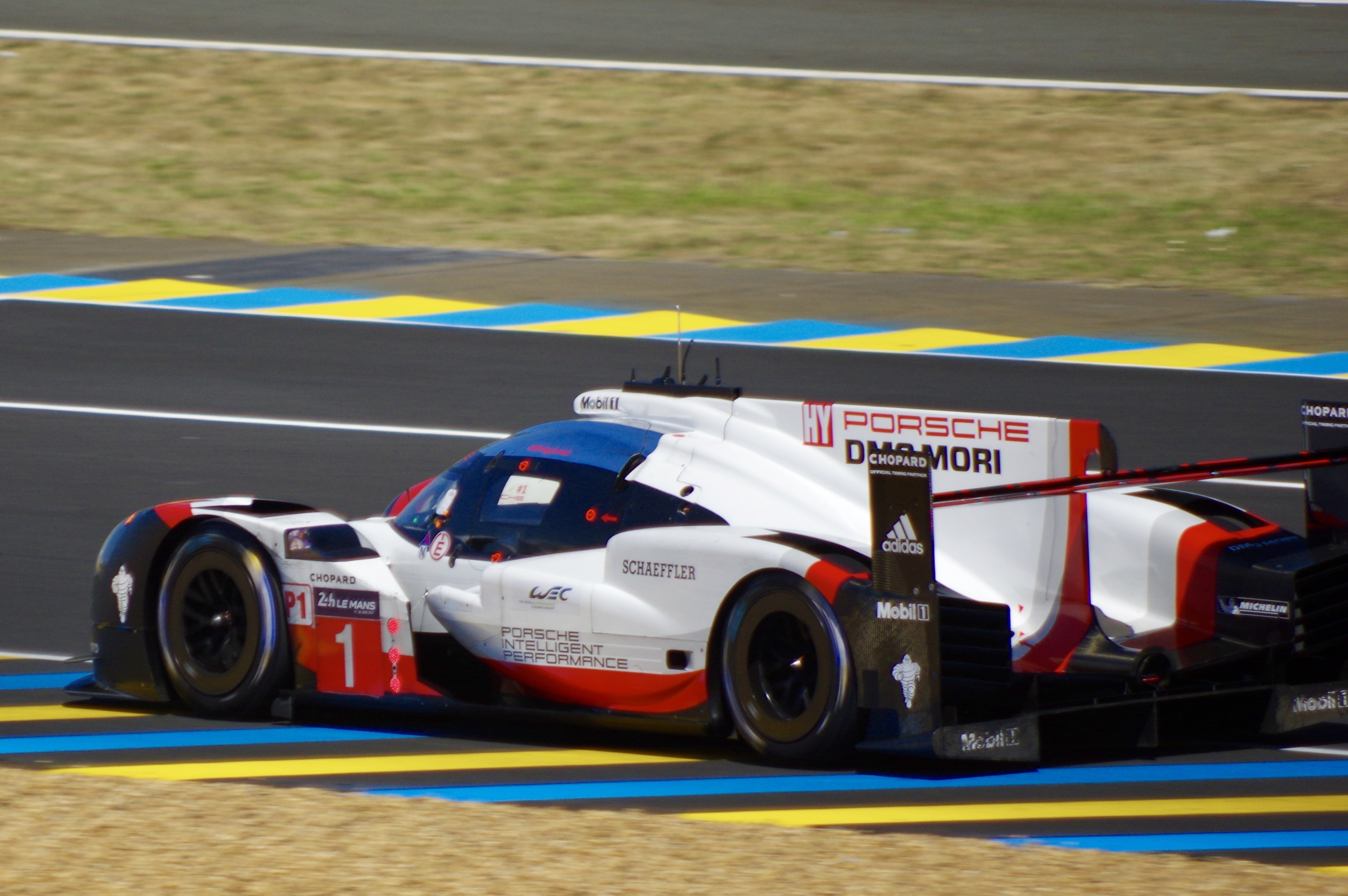
The No. 1 Porsche 919 Hybrid took the race lead until a loss of oil pressure in the engine forced its retirement.

Midway through the seventh hour, Nakajima's No. 8 Toyota passed Lotterer's No. 1 Porsche for second place overall because it was lapping faster as night fell. Nakajima immediately began to pull clear of Lotterer and gain on Sarrazin's race-leading No. 7 Toyota. The No. 98 Aston Martin relinquished its lead in the LMGTE Am category to the No. 84 JMW Ferrari of Stevens when Lamy had a front-right puncture from debris. This removed the bodywork from the car's front-right corner, and Lamy dropped to the rear of the category when he made an unscheduled 18-minute pit stop for repairs. Senna's No. 31 Rebellion car received a drive-through penalty for passing another car in a slow zone. He dropped from the lead of LMP2 to third, and his teammate Piquet, driving the No. 13 Rebellion entry, became the new class leader.

Buemi was battling Jani's No. 1 Porsche when the No. 8 Toyota began to leak oil, but telemetry indicated no issues. Due to a battery-damaging axle hybrid motor failure emitting smoke from the front-right wheel arch, he lost 29 laps and nearly two hours while components were changed in the garage. The left rear of Tommy Milner's No. 64 Corvette was damaged in a spin towards the barrier at the exit of the Porsche Curves due to an incorrectly fitted left rear wheel nut when Milner, struggling to control the car, spun into the pit lane entry gravel. The car was beached on a kerb and extricated by a recovery vehicle, but Tincknell's No. 67 Ford took second in the LMGTE Pro. Piquet's No. 13 Rebellion car lost the lead in LMP2 to Senna's sister No. 31 car when it spent a minute in the pit lane to repair a failed left rear tail light. Olivier Pla got the No. 66 Ford stuck in the left-hand turn gravel run-off area after the Indianapolis corner early in the tenth hour; the car was recovered, leaving gravel on the racing line. The incident led to the race's first safety car's a half-hour for debris removal.

During the slow period, Jani spun the No. 1 Porsche at the pit-lane entry but did not lose position. When Kobayashi brought the race-leading No. 7 Toyota to the pit-lane exit, Algarve Pro Racing driver Vincent Capillaire ran up to the car and gave Kobayashi the thumbs-up signal. Kobayashi interpreted this as a marshal's signal to exit the lane, but further confusion was created when Toyota radioed Kobayashi to stop the car because he had passed a red light. When racing resumed, Kobayashi had worn out the clutch enough to break it and slowed to 60 km/h (37 mph); the clutch, not designed for starting, was stressed by the engine's power and torque. Kobayashi lost drive in the engine and attempted to return to the pit lane on hybrid power, but got as far as the pit lane entry straight before retiring the No. 7 car because of a low battery charge. The No. 7 Toyota's retirement promoted Tandy's No. 1 Porsche to the race lead, Lapierre's No. 9 Toyota to second and Rebellion's No. 31 LMP2-class-leading entry to third overall.

Soon after, in the Dunlop Chicane, Simon Trummer's No. 25 Manor Oreca and Lapierre's No. 9 Toyota's left and right rear corners collided. Trummer retired the No. 25 car in the gravel with major damage, but was unhurt; Lapierre continued with a left-rear puncture which caused the bodywork to flail. Lapierre drove too fast, and rubber chunks from the disintegrating tyre's rim damaged the gearbox hydraulics and an oil line. As a result, the car briefly caught fire, and Lapierre drove on hybrid power before being asked by his team to stop near the pit-lane entry and abandon the car on the side of the circuit. As debris from the two stricken cars was removed from the track, safety cars were required for another 32 minutes. The No. 9 Toyota's retirement moved the Nos. 31 and 13 Rebellion cars to second and third overall. When racing resumed, Tandy slowed the race-leading No. 1 Porsche because he had a nine-lap lead over the LMP2 order. Hankey's No. 90 TF Sport Aston Martin fended off Marvin Dienst's No. 77 Dempsey-Proton Porsche for third in LMGTE Am, with second to fourth in class covered by ten seconds.

After the race's halfway point, Nicolas Prost's No. 31 Rebellion Oreca car entered the garage for an inspection due to a reported gearbox problem. The inspection took five minutes, and the car dropped to fourth in LMP2 (giving Tung's No. 38 DC car the category lead). Christensen lost control of the No. 92 Porsche on the Ford Chicane kerb, heavily damaging the car's rear on the tyre barrier before stopping in the gravel and retired behind the barrier. The safety cars were deployed for the third and final time (for 24 minutes) to allow for barrier repairs and the extrication of the stricken car after Emmanuel Collard crashed the No. 28 TDS Oreca into the tyre wall exiting the Porsche Curves at high speed. Collard sustained bruising and exited the car unaided; he was transported to the medical centre and then Le Mans Hospital for checks. AF Corse's cars were caught out by the safety car's timing and entered the pit lane, moving the No. 63 Corvette to fourth in LMGTE Pro.

=== Morning ===
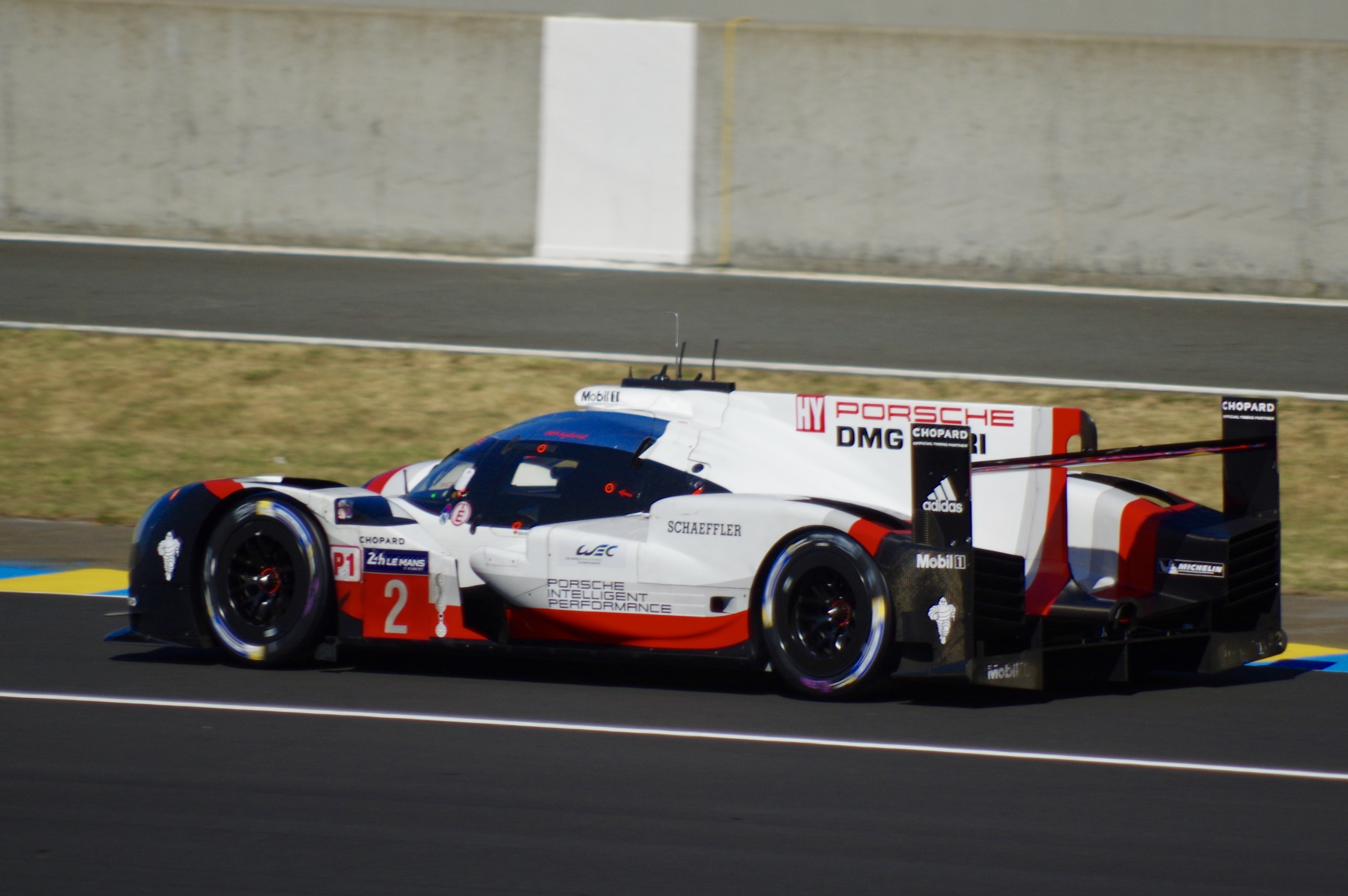
The race-winning No. 2 Porsche 919 Hybrid

After green-flag racing resumed in the early morning, a slow zone was imposed when James Allen beached the No. 40 Graff entry in the gravel trap on the left-hand Indianapolis turn after contact with the barrier and was pushed back onto the circuit. The slow zone lowered the gap between Sørensen's LMGTE Pro-leading No. 95 Aston Martin and Pilet's second-placed No. 92 Porsche to less than 20 seconds. Because the manufacturers used different tyre brands, the Aston Martin and Porsche LMGTE Pro teams had different pit-stop strategies: the Aston Martins could do two stints on their tyres, while the Porsches could do three. Tung used the slow zone to return the No. 38 DC car to the LMP2 lead when Piquet's No. 13 Rebellion entry lost a minute in it. Calado's No. 51 AF Corse Ferrari had to drop out of the LMGTE Pro lead battle when Calado and Rob Bell's No. 90 TF Aston Martin collided at the second Mulsanne chicane; they went to the garage to repair front bodywork damage and a rear diffuser replacement, respectively.

The No. 95 Aston Martin relinquished the LMGTE Pro lead to Jordan Taylor's No. 63 Corvette, which cycled to Makowiecki's No. 92 Porsche on pit-stop rotation when driver Stanaway, on cold tyres after a scheduled pit stop, damaged the car's left front corner against the tyre wall at the Mulsanne hairpin. Stanaway entered the pit lane for quick repairs and Thiim relieved him. The No. 31 Rebellion car stopped in the garage for more than an hour to replace gearbox internals, which promoted Panciatici's No. 35 Signatech Alpine to third in LMP2. Will Owen, driving United Autosports' No. 32 car, was fourth in LMP2 when he spun twice (at Indianapolis corner and the Porsche Curves) and David Cheng's No. 37 DC entry passed him. Dries Vanthoor lost control of JMW's Ferrari at the pit-lane entry, but retained the LMGTE Am lead. Hartley recovered the No. 2 Porsche to fifth overall by the 20th hour, and the LMGTE Pro lead battle was between three cars: the No. 97 Aston Martin, the No. 63 Corvette and the No. 91 Porsche.

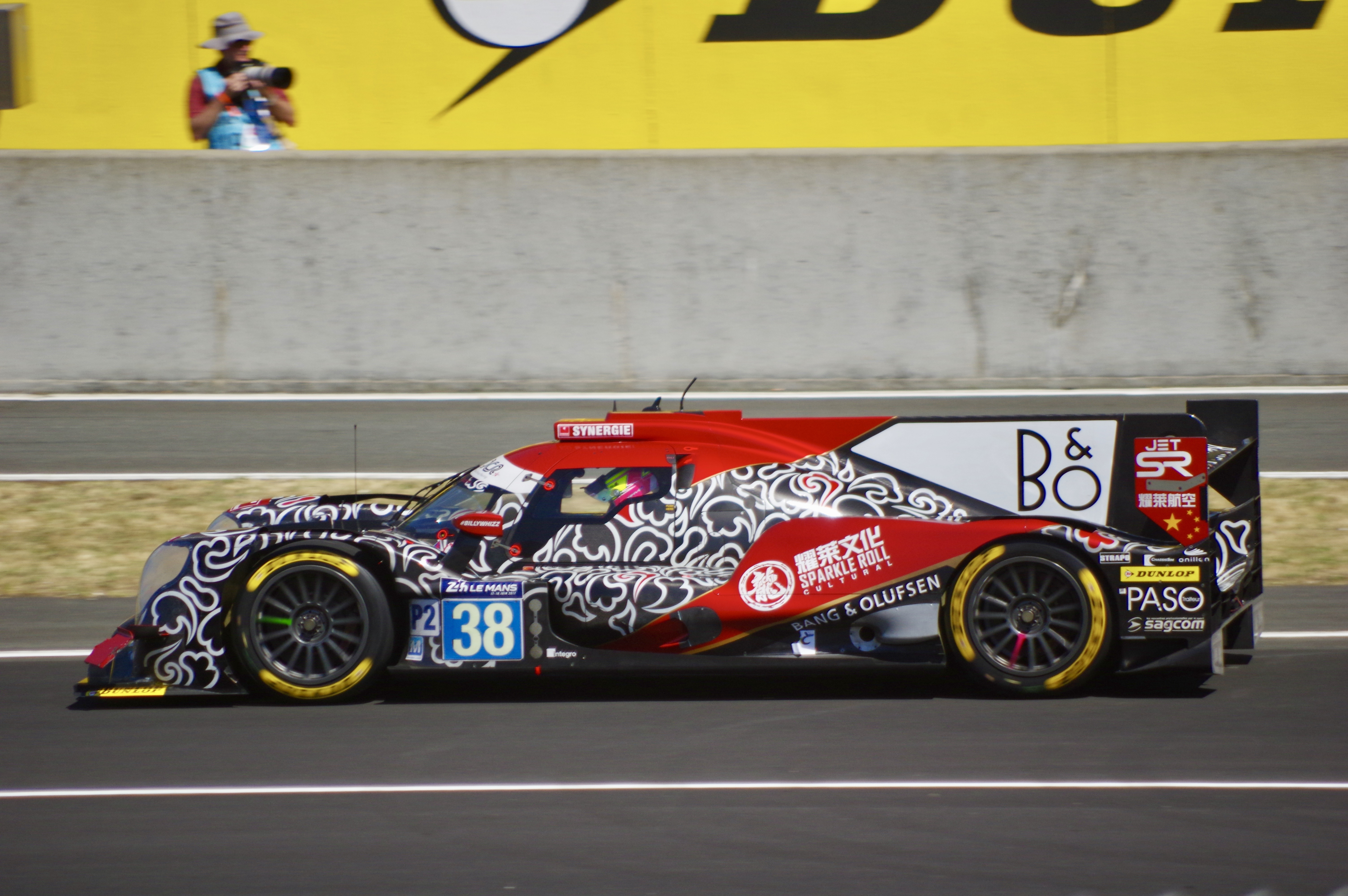
Jackie Chan DC Racing's No. 38 Oreca 07 took the race lead from the No. 1 Porsche 919 Hybrid, following its retirement.

Lotterer's No. 1 Porsche slowed at the Dunlop Curves after 20 hours and 10 minutes when the engine lost oil pressure. Lotterer attempted to return to the pit lane on hybrid power, but was advised to stop and abandon the car on the Mulsanne Straight when Porsche believed the problem could not be fixed and did not want a slow zone or safety car to slow Hartley. Laurent's LMP2-category-leading No. 38 DC Oreca car moved to the race lead after the No. 1 Porsche retired, making him the first LMP2 overall leader in race history. Mathias Beche (second overall) received a stop-and-go while adjusting the brake duct and rear of the No. 13 Rebellion vehicle, and he fell behind Hartley's recovering No. 2 Porsche. Laurent lost a minute in the pit lane when the No. 38 DC car's rear bodywork was changed to repair faulty rear brake lights before Bernhard unlapped the Oreca entry to return the No. 2 Porsche to the lead lap, as he was lapping significantly faster on average than the LMP2 car, at a rate of almost ten seconds.

Piquet's No. 13 Rebellion car battled Negrão's No. 35 Signatech Alpine for third overall in slower traffic before Piquet's pace unsettled his vehicle through the Porsche Curves and allowed Negrão to pull clear. The Rebellion entry received a ten-second time penalty for Piquet's collision with the No. 49 ARC Bratislava Ligier, and it fell back from the Alpine. Makowiecki's No. 91 Porsche exited the LMGTE Pro race after suffering a left-front puncture and making an unscheduled pit stop. Bernhard closed up on Tung's No. 38 DC Oreca car and overtook it on the inside on the right-hand kink into Indianapolis turn for the race lead with just over one hour remaining. Negrão lost the No. 35 Signatech Alpine's hold on third overall to Piquet's No. 13 Rebellion car in the final hour when he slowly got the Alpine stuck in the gravel at Arnage corner while attempting to rejoin the circuit. Adam's No. 97 Aston Martin tried to pass Taylor's No. 63 Corvette for the LMGTE Pro lead, but ran wide and hit the Corvette. He tried again after Taylor drove across the gravel trap at the second Mulsanne Straight chicane and took the category lead on the start-finish straight with two laps remaining, which he maintained to the finish.

=== Finish ===
The No. 2 Porsche team led for the remainder of the race, winning after 367 laps, earning Bamber and Bernhard their second Le Mans victories, Hartley his first and Porsche its 19th. Toyota was able to repair the No. 8 car sufficiently to finish eighth overall and the final LMP1 finisher, nine laps behind the winning Porsche. The No. 38 DC Oreca entry led the final 141 laps of LMP2 to win the category and finish second overall, a lap down. Rebellion's No. 13 car finished provisionally second and third overall, with DC's No. 37 car completing the class podium. Aston Martin secured their first LMGTE Pro Le Mans victory, with Turner taking his third category win and Adam and Serra their first. Tincknell's No. 67 Ford took second in class with a last-lap pass of Taylor's No. 63 Corvette, which had bodywork damage and a slow front-left puncture. JMW, unchallenged since the race's eighth hour, won the LMGTE Am class with the No. 84 Ferrari leading the last 234 laps. The Spirit of Race and Scuderia Corsa Ferraris completed the category podium, two laps behind in second and third.

== Post-race ==
The top three teams in each of the four classes appeared on the podium to collect their trophies, and spoke to the media at a later press conference. Bamber called Porsche's victory "'incredibly nerve-wracking. A great fightback from us, and one of those fairytale Le Mans stories I think'". Hartley added, "'You can't write these stories. It's Le Mans. It's always unpredictable. Sometimes at the beginning of the race you don't believe that such a story exists. But it did'". Bernhard remarked the race could be either "the cruellest race or it can be the best race ever" and that the objective was to score the maximum drivers' and manufacturers' championship points available. Oliver Jarvis said, "'We can't be disappointed winning LMP2 and finishing second, but there was a moment when I saw the #1 Porsche at the side of the track and thought we could actually win! It would have been incredible'". Tung called the LMP2 victory "'extremely important. Not just to win here at Le Mans, it's so special, but also for the World Endurance Championship, it's a very important race'". Jota Sport team director Sam Hignett said an LMP2 car winning overall might have been "'legendary'" with "'a little bit more luck'", but the team was delighted to achieve its objectives. Actor Jackie Chan equated his team's class victory to his winning an Academy Award. FIA president Jean Todt said that LMP2 cars driven by unknown drivers leading the race and finishing on the overall podium were "'great for racing'".

After the race, third-place-overall finisher No. 13 Rebellion Oreca was disqualified by race officials after it was found that the team had modified its rear bodywork by cutting a hole to allow them to access a faulty starter motor; it was declared an unnecessary modification of approved bodywork. The disqualification moved the second Jackie Chan DC Racing car to third place overall, and second in class. Rebellion Racing issued a statement admitting an "'error of judgement'". Rusinov was assessed a three-minute penalty at the following 6 Hours of Nürburgring, with three additional stop-and-go penalties suspended for the following three FIA WEC events, for his second-hour collision with Al-Qubaisi's Porsche. Rusinov called the penalty a "'very harsh decision'", saying that he had apologised to Al-Quabisi and his team; Al-Quabisi told Rusinov that he would have allowed him past at the next corner.

Toyota president Akio Toyoda suggested that hybrid technology may not yet have been developed enough to cope with the event's demands. Oreca president Hugues de Chaunac echoed Toyoda, suggesting that the state of LMP1 hybrid cars were too convoluted. Porsche team principal Andreas Seidl felt that the hybrid failures were a consequence of faster racing, and Porsche had not experienced such problems. Jarvis said that ACO rule changes attempting to slow the LMP1 hybrid cars were ineffective and impaired reliability. Capillaire apologised to Toyota (which was accepted) for indirectly causing the No. 7 car's retirement, saying that he ran across the pit lane to encourage Kobayashi. Kobayashi said "It is so disappointing" following his retirement and that he felt very sad for all of the Toyota staff. Kaffer accepted an apology from Vaxivière for the incident which took the Risi Ferrari out of the race, and for which Vaxivière was strongly criticised. Prodrive chairman David Richards praised the "'extraordinary'" team effort of his Aston Martin team to win LMGTE Pro; Adam called his pursuit of Taylor "'the stint of my life'", saying that his team's reaction to his race-winning overtake of Taylor "'was quite emotional'".

Bamber, Bernhard, and Hartley took the Drivers' Championship lead with 83 points; Buemi, Davidson, and Nakajima fell to second with 66, and Jarvis, Laurent, and Tung moved from sixth to third. Porsche overtook Toyota to lead the Manufacturers' Championship by 28.5 points. Derani, Priaulx, and Tincknell remained the GT World Endurance Drivers' Championship leaders, with Adam, Serra, and Turner second. Ford took the GT World Endurance Manufacturers' Championship lead from Ferrari with six races left in the season.

== Official results ==
The minimum number of laps for classification (70 per cent of the overall winning car's race distance) was 257 laps. Class winners are in bold.

Final race classification
Pos	Class	No	Team	Drivers	Chassis	Tyre	Laps	Time/Retired
Pos	Class	No	Team	Drivers	Engine	Tyre	Laps	Time/Retired
1	**LMP1**	**2**	**(Germany) Porsche LMP Team**	**(Germany) Timo Bernhard (New Zealand) Brendon Hartley (New Zealand) Earl Bamber**	**Porsche 919 Hybrid**	M	**367**	**24:01:14.075**
1	**LMP1**	**2**	**(Germany) Porsche LMP Team**	**(Germany) Timo Bernhard (New Zealand) Brendon Hartley (New Zealand) Earl Bamber**	**Porsche 2.0 L Turbo V4**	M	**367**	**24:01:14.075**
2	**LMP2**	**38**	**(China) Jackie Chan DC Racing**	**(Netherlands) Ho-Pin Tung (France) Thomas Laurent (United Kingdom) Oliver Jarvis**	**Oreca 07**	D	**366**	**+1 Lap**
2	**LMP2**	**38**	**(China) Jackie Chan DC Racing**	**(Netherlands) Ho-Pin Tung (France) Thomas Laurent (United Kingdom) Oliver Jarvis**	**Gibson GK428 4.2 L V8**	D	**366**	**+1 Lap**
3	LMP2	37	(China) Jackie Chan DC Racing	(United States) David Cheng (France) Tristan Gommendy (United Kingdom) Alex Brundle	Oreca 07	D	363	+4 Laps
3	LMP2	37	(China) Jackie Chan DC Racing	(United States) David Cheng (France) Tristan Gommendy (United Kingdom) Alex Brundle	Gibson GK428 4.2 L V8	D	363	+4 Laps
4	LMP2	35	(France) Signatech Alpine Matmut	(France) Nelson Panciatici (France) Pierre Ragues (Brazil) André Negrão	Alpine A470	D	362	+5 Laps
4	LMP2	35	(France) Signatech Alpine Matmut	(France) Nelson Panciatici (France) Pierre Ragues (Brazil) André Negrão	Gibson GK428 4.2 L V8	D	362	+5 Laps
5	LMP2	32	(United States) United Autosports	(United States) Will Owen (Switzerland) Hugo de Sadeleer (Portugal) Filipe Albuquerque	Ligier JS P217	D	362	+5 Laps
5	LMP2	32	(United States) United Autosports	(United States) Will Owen (Switzerland) Hugo de Sadeleer (Portugal) Filipe Albuquerque	Gibson GK428 4.2 L V8	D	362	+5 Laps
6	LMP2	40	(France) Graff	(Australia) James Allen (United Kingdom) Richard Bradley (France) Franck Matelli	Oreca 07	D	361	+6 Laps
6	LMP2	40	(France) Graff	(Australia) James Allen (United Kingdom) Richard Bradley (France) Franck Matelli	Gibson GK428 4.2 L V8	D	361	+6 Laps
7	LMP2	24	(China) CEFC Manor TRS Racing	(Thailand) Tor Graves (Switzerland) Jonathan Hirschi (France) Jean-Éric Vergne	Oreca 07	D	360	+7 Laps
7	LMP2	24	(China) CEFC Manor TRS Racing	(Thailand) Tor Graves (Switzerland) Jonathan Hirschi (France) Jean-Éric Vergne	Gibson GK428 4.2 L V8	D	360	+7 Laps
8	LMP1	8	(Japan) Toyota Gazoo Racing	(Switzerland) Sébastien Buemi (Japan) Kazuki Nakajima (United Kingdom) Anthony Davidson	Toyota TS050 Hybrid	M	358	+9 Laps
8	LMP1	8	(Japan) Toyota Gazoo Racing	(Switzerland) Sébastien Buemi (Japan) Kazuki Nakajima (United Kingdom) Anthony Davidson	Toyota 2.4 L Turbo V6	M	358	+9 Laps
9	LMP2	47	(Italy) Cetilar Villorba Corse	(Italy) Andrea Belicchi (Italy) Roberto Lacorte (Italy) Giorgio Sernagiotto	Dallara P217	D	353	+14 Laps
9	LMP2	47	(Italy) Cetilar Villorba Corse	(Italy) Andrea Belicchi (Italy) Roberto Lacorte (Italy) Giorgio Sernagiotto	Gibson GK428 4.2 L V8	D	353	+14 Laps
10	LMP2	36	(France) Signatech Alpine Matmut	(France) Romain Dumas (United States) Gustavo Menezes (United Kingdom) Matt Rao	Alpine A470	D	351	+16 Laps
10	LMP2	36	(France) Signatech Alpine Matmut	(France) Romain Dumas (United States) Gustavo Menezes (United Kingdom) Matt Rao	Gibson GK428 4.2 L V8	D	351	+16 Laps
11	LMP2	34	(United Kingdom) Tockwith Motorsports	(United Kingdom) Phil Hanson (United Kingdom) Nigel Moore (India) Karun Chandhok	Ligier JS P217	D	351	+16 Laps
11	LMP2	34	(United Kingdom) Tockwith Motorsports	(United Kingdom) Phil Hanson (United Kingdom) Nigel Moore (India) Karun Chandhok	Gibson GK428 4.2 L V8	D	351	+16 Laps
12	LMP2	17	(France) IDEC Sport Racing	(France) Patrice Lafargue (France) Paul Lafargue (France) David Zollinger	Ligier JS P217	M	344	+23 Laps
12	LMP2	17	(France) IDEC Sport Racing	(France) Patrice Lafargue (France) Paul Lafargue (France) David Zollinger	Gibson GK428 4.2 L V8	M	344	+23 Laps
13	LMP2	29	(Netherlands) Racing Team Nederland	(Brazil) Rubens Barrichello (Netherlands) Jan Lammers (Netherlands) Frits van Eerd	Dallara P217	D	344	+23 Laps
13	LMP2	29	(Netherlands) Racing Team Nederland	(Brazil) Rubens Barrichello (Netherlands) Jan Lammers (Netherlands) Frits van Eerd	Gibson GK428 4.2 L V8	D	344	+23 Laps
14	LMP2	21	(United States) DragonSpeed – 10 Star	(Sweden) Henrik Hedman (Sweden) Felix Rosenqvist (United Kingdom) Ben Hanley	Oreca 07	D	343	+24 Laps
14	LMP2	21	(United States) DragonSpeed – 10 Star	(Sweden) Henrik Hedman (Sweden) Felix Rosenqvist (United Kingdom) Ben Hanley	Gibson GK428 4.2 L V8	D	343	+24 Laps
15	LMP2	33	(Philippines) Eurasia Motorsport	(France) Jacques Nicolet (France) Pierre Nicolet (France) Erik Maris	Ligier JS P217	D	341	+26 Laps
15	LMP2	33	(Philippines) Eurasia Motorsport	(France) Jacques Nicolet (France) Pierre Nicolet (France) Erik Maris	Gibson GK428 4.2 L V8	D	341	+26 Laps
16	LMP2	31	(Switzerland) Vaillante Rebellion	(Brazil) Bruno Senna (France) Nicolas Prost (France) Julien Canal	Oreca 07	D	340	+27 Laps
16	LMP2	31	(Switzerland) Vaillante Rebellion	(Brazil) Bruno Senna (France) Nicolas Prost (France) Julien Canal	Gibson GK428 4.2 L V8	D	340	+27 Laps
17	**LMGTE; Pro**	**97**	**(United Kingdom) Aston Martin Racing**	**(United Kingdom) Darren Turner (United Kingdom) Jonathan Adam (Brazil) Daniel Serra**	**Aston Martin Vantage GTE**	D	**340**	**+27 Laps**
17	**LMGTE; Pro**	**97**	**(United Kingdom) Aston Martin Racing**	**(United Kingdom) Darren Turner (United Kingdom) Jonathan Adam (Brazil) Daniel Serra**	**Aston Martin 4.5 L V8**	D	**340**	**+27 Laps**
18	LMGTE; Pro	67	(United States) Ford Chip Ganassi Team UK	(United Kingdom) Harry Tincknell (United Kingdom) Andy Priaulx (Brazil) Pipo Derani	Ford GT	M	340	+27 Laps
18	LMGTE; Pro	67	(United States) Ford Chip Ganassi Team UK	(United Kingdom) Harry Tincknell (United Kingdom) Andy Priaulx (Brazil) Pipo Derani	Ford EcoBoost 3.5 L Turbo V6	M	340	+27 Laps
19	LMGTE; Pro	63	(United States) Corvette Racing – GM	(Denmark) Jan Magnussen (Spain) Antonio García (United States) Jordan Taylor	Chevrolet Corvette C7.R	M	340	+27 Laps
19	LMGTE; Pro	63	(United States) Corvette Racing – GM	(Denmark) Jan Magnussen (Spain) Antonio García (United States) Jordan Taylor	Chevrolet 5.5 L V8	M	340	+27 Laps
20	LMGTE; Pro	91	(Germany) Porsche GT Team	(Austria) Richard Lietz (France) Frédéric Makowiecki (France) Patrick Pilet	Porsche 911 RSR	M	339	+28 Laps
20	LMGTE; Pro	91	(Germany) Porsche GT Team	(Austria) Richard Lietz (France) Frédéric Makowiecki (France) Patrick Pilet	Porsche 4.0 L Flat-6	M	339	+28 Laps
21	LMGTE; Pro	71	(Italy) AF Corse	(Italy) Davide Rigon (United Kingdom) Sam Bird (Spain) Miguel Molina	Ferrari 488 GTE	M	339	+28 Laps
21	LMGTE; Pro	71	(Italy) AF Corse	(Italy) Davide Rigon (United Kingdom) Sam Bird (Spain) Miguel Molina	Ferrari F154CB 3.9 L Turbo V8	M	339	+28 Laps
22	LMGTE; Pro	68	(United States) Ford Chip Ganassi Team USA	(United States) Joey Hand (Brazil) Tony Kanaan (Germany) Dirk Müller	Ford GT	M	339	+28 Laps
22	LMGTE; Pro	68	(United States) Ford Chip Ganassi Team USA	(United States) Joey Hand (Brazil) Tony Kanaan (Germany) Dirk Müller	Ford EcoBoost 3.5 L Turbo V6	M	339	+28 Laps
23	LMGTE; Pro	69	(United States) Ford Chip Ganassi Team USA	(Australia) Ryan Briscoe (New Zealand) Scott Dixon (United Kingdom) Richard Westbrook	Ford GT	M	337	+30 Laps
23	LMGTE; Pro	69	(United States) Ford Chip Ganassi Team USA	(Australia) Ryan Briscoe (New Zealand) Scott Dixon (United Kingdom) Richard Westbrook	Ford EcoBoost 3.5 L Turbo V6	M	337	+30 Laps
24	LMGTE; Pro	64	(United States) Corvette Racing – GM	(United Kingdom) Oliver Gavin (United States) Tommy Milner (Switzerland) Marcel Fässler	Chevrolet Corvette C7.R	M	335	+32 Laps
24	LMGTE; Pro	64	(United States) Corvette Racing – GM	(United Kingdom) Oliver Gavin (United States) Tommy Milner (Switzerland) Marcel Fässler	Chevrolet 5.5 L V8	M	335	+32 Laps
25	LMGTE; Pro	95	(United Kingdom) Aston Martin Racing	(Denmark) Nicki Thiim (Denmark) Marco Sørensen (New Zealand) Richie Stanaway	Aston Martin Vantage GTE	D	334	+33 Laps
25	LMGTE; Pro	95	(United Kingdom) Aston Martin Racing	(Denmark) Nicki Thiim (Denmark) Marco Sørensen (New Zealand) Richie Stanaway	Aston Martin 4.5 L V8	D	334	+33 Laps
26	**LMGTE; Am**	**84**	**(United Kingdom) JMW Motorsport**	**(United Kingdom) Robert Smith (United Kingdom) Will Stevens (Belgium) Dries Vanthoor**	**Ferrari 488 GTE**	M	**333**	**+34 Laps**
26	**LMGTE; Am**	**84**	**(United Kingdom) JMW Motorsport**	**(United Kingdom) Robert Smith (United Kingdom) Will Stevens (Belgium) Dries Vanthoor**	**Ferrari F154CB 3.9 L Turbo V8**	M	**333**	**+34 Laps**
27	LMGTE; Pro	66	(United States) Ford Chip Ganassi Team UK	(Germany) Stefan Mücke (France) Olivier Pla (United States) Billy Johnson	Ford GT	M	332	+35 Laps
27	LMGTE; Pro	66	(United States) Ford Chip Ganassi Team UK	(Germany) Stefan Mücke (France) Olivier Pla (United States) Billy Johnson	Ford EcoBoost 3.5 L Turbo V6	M	332	+35 Laps
28	LMGTE; Am	55	(Switzerland) Spirit of Race	(United Kingdom) Duncan Cameron (United Kingdom) Aaron Scott (Italy) Marco Cioci	Ferrari 488 GTE	M	331	+36 Laps
28	LMGTE; Am	55	(Switzerland) Spirit of Race	(United Kingdom) Duncan Cameron (United Kingdom) Aaron Scott (Italy) Marco Cioci	Ferrari F154CB 3.9 L Turbo V8	M	331	+36 Laps
29	LMGTE; Am	62	(United States) Scuderia Corsa	(United States) Cooper MacNeil (United States) Bill Sweedler (United States) Townsend Bell	Ferrari 488 GTE	M	331	+36 Laps
29	LMGTE; Am	62	(United States) Scuderia Corsa	(United States) Cooper MacNeil (United States) Bill Sweedler (United States) Townsend Bell	Ferrari F154CB 3.9 L Turbo V8	M	331	+36 Laps
30	LMGTE; Am	99	(United Kingdom) Beechdean AMR	(United Kingdom) Andrew Howard (United Kingdom) Ross Gunn (United Kingdom) Oliver Bryant	Aston Martin Vantage GTE	D	331	+36 Laps
30	LMGTE; Am	99	(United Kingdom) Beechdean AMR	(United Kingdom) Andrew Howard (United Kingdom) Ross Gunn (United Kingdom) Oliver Bryant	Aston Martin 4.5 L V8	D	331	+36 Laps
31	LMGTE; Am	61	(Singapore) Clearwater Racing	(Malaysia) Weng Sun Mok (Japan) Keita Sawa (Republic of Ireland) Matt Griffin	Ferrari 488 GTE	M	330	+37 Laps
31	LMGTE; Am	61	(Singapore) Clearwater Racing	(Malaysia) Weng Sun Mok (Japan) Keita Sawa (Republic of Ireland) Matt Griffin	Ferrari F154CB 3.9 L Turbo V8	M	330	+37 Laps
32	LMP2	45	(Portugal) Algarve Pro Racing	(United States) Mark Patterson (United States) Matt McMurry (France) Vincent Capillaire	Ligier JS P217	D	330	+37 Laps
32	LMP2	45	(Portugal) Algarve Pro Racing	(United States) Mark Patterson (United States) Matt McMurry (France) Vincent Capillaire	Gibson GK428 4.2 L V8	D	330	+37 Laps
33	LMP2	27	(Russia) SMP Racing	(Russia) Mikhail Aleshin (Russia) Sergey Sirotkin (Russia) Viktor Shaytar	Dallara P217	D	330	+37 Laps
33	LMP2	27	(Russia) SMP Racing	(Russia) Mikhail Aleshin (Russia) Sergey Sirotkin (Russia) Viktor Shaytar	Gibson GK428 4.2 L V8	D	330	+37 Laps
34	LMGTE; Am	77	(Germany) Dempsey-Proton Racing	(Germany) Christian Ried (Germany) Marvin Dienst (Italy) Matteo Cairoli	Porsche 911 RSR	D	329	+38 Laps
34	LMGTE; Am	77	(Germany) Dempsey-Proton Racing	(Germany) Christian Ried (Germany) Marvin Dienst (Italy) Matteo Cairoli	Porsche 4.0 L Flat-6	D	329	+38 Laps
35	LMGTE; Am	90	(United Kingdom) TF Sport	(Turkey) Salih Yoluç (United Kingdom) Euan Hankey (United Kingdom) Rob Bell	Aston Martin Vantage GTE	D	329	+38 Laps
35	LMGTE; Am	90	(United Kingdom) TF Sport	(Turkey) Salih Yoluç (United Kingdom) Euan Hankey (United Kingdom) Rob Bell	Aston Martin 4.5 L V8	D	329	+38 Laps
36	LMGTE; Am	98	(United Kingdom) Aston Martin Racing	(Canada) Paul Dalla Lana (Austria) Mathias Lauda (Portugal) Pedro Lamy	Aston Martin Vantage GTE	D	329	+38 Laps
36	LMGTE; Am	98	(United Kingdom) Aston Martin Racing	(Canada) Paul Dalla Lana (Austria) Mathias Lauda (Portugal) Pedro Lamy	Aston Martin 4.5 L V8	D	329	+38 Laps
37	LMGTE; Am	93	(Germany) Proton Competition	(United States) Patrick Long (United States) Mike Hedlund (Saudi Arabia) Abdulaziz Al Faisal	Porsche 911 RSR	D	329	+38 Laps
37	LMGTE; Am	93	(Germany) Proton Competition	(United States) Patrick Long (United States) Mike Hedlund (Saudi Arabia) Abdulaziz Al Faisal	Porsche 4.0 L Flat-6	D	329	+38 Laps
38	LMGTE; Am	86	(United Kingdom) Gulf Racing UK	(United Kingdom) Michael Wainwright (United Kingdom) Ben Barker (Australia) Nick Foster	Porsche 911 RSR	D	328	+39 Laps
38	LMGTE; Am	86	(United Kingdom) Gulf Racing UK	(United Kingdom) Michael Wainwright (United Kingdom) Ben Barker (Australia) Nick Foster	Porsche 4.0 L Flat-6	D	328	+39 Laps
39	LMP2	22	(Russia) G-Drive Racing	(Mexico) Memo Rojas (Japan) Ryō Hirakawa (Mexico) José Gutiérrez	Oreca 07	D	327	+40 Laps
39	LMP2	22	(Russia) G-Drive Racing	(Mexico) Memo Rojas (Japan) Ryō Hirakawa (Mexico) José Gutiérrez	Gibson GK428 4.2 L V8	D	327	+40 Laps
40	LMGTE; Am	60	(Singapore) Clearwater Racing	(Singapore) Richard Wee (Portugal) Álvaro Parente (Japan) Hiroki Katoh	Ferrari 488 GTE	M	327	+40 Laps
40	LMGTE; Am	60	(Singapore) Clearwater Racing	(Singapore) Richard Wee (Portugal) Álvaro Parente (Japan) Hiroki Katoh	Ferrari F154CB 3.9 L Turbo V8	M	327	+40 Laps
41	LMGTE; Am	54	(Switzerland) Spirit of Race	(Switzerland) Thomas Flohr (Italy) Francesco Castellacci (Monaco) Olivier Beretta	Ferrari 488 GTE	M	326	+41 Laps
41	LMGTE; Am	54	(Switzerland) Spirit of Race	(Switzerland) Thomas Flohr (Italy) Francesco Castellacci (Monaco) Olivier Beretta	Ferrari F154CB 3.9 L Turbo V8	M	326	+41 Laps
42	LMGTE; Am	83	(Hong Kong) DH Racing	(United States) Tracy Krohn (Sweden) Niclas Jönsson (Italy) Andrea Bertolini	Ferrari 488 GTE	M	320	+47 Laps
42	LMGTE; Am	83	(Hong Kong) DH Racing	(United States) Tracy Krohn (Sweden) Niclas Jönsson (Italy) Andrea Bertolini	Ferrari F154CB 3.9 L Turbo V8	M	320	+47 Laps
43	LMP2	39	(France) Graff	(France) Eric Trouillet (France) Enzo Guibbert (United Kingdom) James Winslow	Oreca 07	D	318	+49 Laps
43	LMP2	39	(France) Graff	(France) Eric Trouillet (France) Enzo Guibbert (United Kingdom) James Winslow	Gibson GK428 4.2 L V8	D	318	+49 Laps
44	LMGTE; Am	65	(United States) Scuderia Corsa	(Denmark) Christina Nielsen (Italy) Alessandro Balzan (United States) Bret Curtis	Ferrari 488 GTE	M	314	+53 Laps
44	LMGTE; Am	65	(United States) Scuderia Corsa	(Denmark) Christina Nielsen (Italy) Alessandro Balzan (United States) Bret Curtis	Ferrari F154CB 3.9 L Turbo V8	M	314	+53 Laps
45	LMP2	49	(Slovakia) ARC Bratislava	(Slovakia) Miroslav Konôpka (Latvia) Konstantīns Calko (Netherlands) Rik Breukers	Ligier JS P217	M	314	+53 Laps
45	LMP2	49	(Slovakia) ARC Bratislava	(Slovakia) Miroslav Konôpka (Latvia) Konstantīns Calko (Netherlands) Rik Breukers	Gibson GK428 4.2 L V8	M	314	+53 Laps
46	LMGTE; Pro	51	(Italy) AF Corse	(United Kingdom) James Calado (Italy) Alessandro Pier Guidi (Italy) Michele Rugolo	Ferrari 488 GTE	M	312	+55 Laps
46	LMGTE; Pro	51	(Italy) AF Corse	(United Kingdom) James Calado (Italy) Alessandro Pier Guidi (Italy) Michele Rugolo	Ferrari F154CB 3.9 L Turbo V8	M	312	+55 Laps
47	LMP2	43	(United States) Keating Motorsport	(United States) Ben Keating (United States) Ricky Taylor (Netherlands) Jeroen Bleekemolen	Riley Mk. 30	M	312	+55 Laps
47	LMP2	43	(United States) Keating Motorsport	(United States) Ben Keating (United States) Ricky Taylor (Netherlands) Jeroen Bleekemolen	Gibson GK428 4.2 L V8	M	312	+55 Laps
48	LMGTE; Am	50	(France) Larbre Compétition	(France) Romain Brandela (France) Christian Philippon (Brazil) Fernando Rees	Chevrolet Corvette C7.R	M	309	+58 Laps
48	LMGTE; Am	50	(France) Larbre Compétition	(France) Romain Brandela (France) Christian Philippon (Brazil) Fernando Rees	Chevrolet 5.5 L V8	M	309	+58 Laps
DNF	LMP1	1	(Germany) Porsche LMP Team	(Switzerland) Neel Jani (United Kingdom) Nick Tandy (Germany) André Lotterer	Porsche 919 Hybrid	M	318	Mechanical
DNF	LMP1	1	(Germany) Porsche LMP Team	(Switzerland) Neel Jani (United Kingdom) Nick Tandy (Germany) André Lotterer	Porsche 2.0 L Turbo V4	M	318	Mechanical
DNF	LMP2	23	(France) Panis Barthez Competition	(France) Fabien Barthez (France) Timothé Buret (France) Nathanaël Berthon	Ligier JS P217	M	296	Retired
DNF	LMP2	23	(France) Panis Barthez Competition	(France) Fabien Barthez (France) Timothé Buret (France) Nathanaël Berthon	Gibson GK428 4.2 L V8	M	296	Retired
DNF	LMP2	28	(France) TDS Racing	(France) François Perrodo (France) Emmanuel Collard (France) Matthieu Vaxivière	Oreca 07	D	213	Accident
DNF	LMP2	28	(France) TDS Racing	(France) François Perrodo (France) Emmanuel Collard (France) Matthieu Vaxivière	Gibson GK428 4.2 L V8	D	213	Accident
DNF	LMGTE; Pro	92	(Germany) Porsche GT Team	(Denmark) Michael Christensen (France) Kévin Estre (Germany) Dirk Werner	Porsche 911 RSR	M	179	Retired
DNF	LMGTE; Pro	92	(Germany) Porsche GT Team	(Denmark) Michael Christensen (France) Kévin Estre (Germany) Dirk Werner	Porsche 4.0 L Flat-6	M	179	Retired
DNF	LMP1	9	(Japan) Toyota Gazoo Racing	(Argentina) José María López (France) Nicolas Lapierre (Japan) Yuji Kunimoto	Toyota TS050 Hybrid	M	160	Puncture
DNF	LMP1	9	(Japan) Toyota Gazoo Racing	(Argentina) José María López (France) Nicolas Lapierre (Japan) Yuji Kunimoto	Toyota 2.4 L Turbo V6	M	160	Puncture
DNF	LMP1	7	(Japan) Toyota Gazoo Racing	(United Kingdom) Mike Conway (Japan) Kamui Kobayashi (France) Stéphane Sarrazin	Toyota TS050 Hybrid	M	154	Clutch
DNF	LMP1	7	(Japan) Toyota Gazoo Racing	(United Kingdom) Mike Conway (Japan) Kamui Kobayashi (France) Stéphane Sarrazin	Toyota 2.4 L Turbo V6	M	154	Clutch
DNF	LMP2	25	(China) CEFC Manor TRS Racing	(Mexico) Roberto González (Switzerland) Simon Trummer (Russia) Vitaly Petrov	Oreca 07	D	152	Collision
DNF	LMP2	25	(China) CEFC Manor TRS Racing	(Mexico) Roberto González (Switzerland) Simon Trummer (Russia) Vitaly Petrov	Gibson GK428 4.2 L V8	D	152	Collision
DNF	LMGTE; Pro	82	(United States) Risi Competizione	(Finland) Toni Vilander (Italy) Giancarlo Fisichella (Germany) Pierre Kaffer	Ferrari 488 GTE	M	72	Collision
DNF	LMGTE; Pro	82	(United States) Risi Competizione	(Finland) Toni Vilander (Italy) Giancarlo Fisichella (Germany) Pierre Kaffer	Ferrari F154CB 3.9 L Turbo V8	M	72	Collision
DNF	LMP2	26	(Russia) G-Drive Racing	(Russia) Roman Rusinov (France) Pierre Thiriet (United Kingdom) Alex Lynn	Oreca 07	D	20	Collision
DNF	LMP2	26	(Russia) G-Drive Racing	(Russia) Roman Rusinov (France) Pierre Thiriet (United Kingdom) Alex Lynn	Gibson GK428 4.2 L V8	D	20	Collision
DNF	LMGTE; Am	88	(Germany) Proton Competition	(Austria) Klaus Bachler (Belgium) Stéphane Lémeret (United Arab Emirates) Khaled Al Qubaisi	Porsche 911 RSR	D	18	Collision
DNF	LMGTE; Am	88	(Germany) Proton Competition	(Austria) Klaus Bachler (Belgium) Stéphane Lémeret (United Arab Emirates) Khaled Al Qubaisi	Porsche 4.0 L Flat-6	D	18	Collision
DNF	LMP1	4	(Austria) ByKolles Racing Team	(Austria) Dominik Kraihamer (United Kingdom) Oliver Webb (Italy) Marco Bonanomi	ENSO CLM P01/01	M	7	Retired
DNF	LMP1	4	(Austria) ByKolles Racing Team	(Austria) Dominik Kraihamer (United Kingdom) Oliver Webb (Italy) Marco Bonanomi	Nismo VRX30A 3.0 L Turbo V6	M	7	Retired
DSQ	LMP2	13	(Switzerland) Vaillante Rebellion	(Brazil) Nelson Piquet Jr. (Switzerland) Mathias Beche (Denmark) David Heinemeier Hansson	Oreca 07	D	364	Disqualified (Note: The No. 13 Rebellion Oreca was disqualified from the race after the team was found to have intentionally modified the bodywork on the car to permit starting it more easily.)
DSQ	LMP2	13	(Switzerland) Vaillante Rebellion	(Brazil) Nelson Piquet Jr. (Switzerland) Mathias Beche (Denmark) David Heinemeier Hansson	Gibson GK428 4.2 L V8	D	364	Disqualified

Tyre manufacturers
Key
Symbol	Tyre manufacturer
**D**	Dunlop
**M**	Michelin

== Championship standings after the race ==
2017 World Endurance Drivers' Championship
Pos.	+/–	Driver	Points
1	1	(Germany) Timo Bernhard (New Zealand) Brendon Hartley (New Zealand) Earl Bamber	83
2	1	(Switzerland) Sébastien Buemi (United Kingdom) Anthony Davidson (Japan) Kazuki Nakajima	66
3	3	(United Kingdom) Oliver Jarvis (France) Thomas Laurent (Netherlands) Ho-Pin Tung	50
4	13	(United Kingdom) Alex Brundle (United States) David Cheng (France) Tristan Gommendy	31
5	2	(Switzerland) Neel Jani (Germany) André Lotterer (United Kingdom) Nick Tandy	28

2017 World Manufacturers' Championship
Pos.	+/–	Team	Points
1	1	(Germany) Porsche	111
2	1	(Japan) Toyota	82.5

- Note: Only the top five positions are included for the Drivers' Championship standings.

2017 GT World Endurance Drivers' Championship
Pos.	+/–	Driver	Points
1		(Brazil) Pipo Derani (United Kingdom) Andy Priaulx (United Kingdom) Harry Tincknell	74
2	5	(United Kingdom) Jonathan Adam (Brazil) Daniel Serra (United Kingdom) Darren Turner	63
3	1	(United Kingdom) Sam Bird (Italy) Davide Rigon	60
4	1	(Austria) Richard Lietz (France) Frédéric Makowiecki	55
5	1	(Germany) Stefan Mücke (France) Olivier Pla	45

2017 GT World Endurance Manufacturers' Championship
Pos.	+/–	Constructor	Points
1	1	(United States) Ford	117
2	1	(Italy) Ferrari	108
3	1	(United Kingdom) Aston Martin	95
4	1	(Germany) Porsche	72

- Note: Only the top five positions are included for the Drivers' Championship standings.

== Bibliography ==
- "24H Le Mans 2017 Specific Regulation" (PDF). Automobile Club de l'Ouest. 16 May 2017. Archived (PDF) from the original on 14 July 2017.

FIA World Endurance Championship
Previous race: 6 Hours of Spa-Francorchamps	2017 season	Next race: 6 Hours of Nürburgring
