= Musée des 24 Heures du Mans =

Motorsport museum in France

Museum of the 24 Hours of Le Mans
- Musée des 24 Heures du Mans
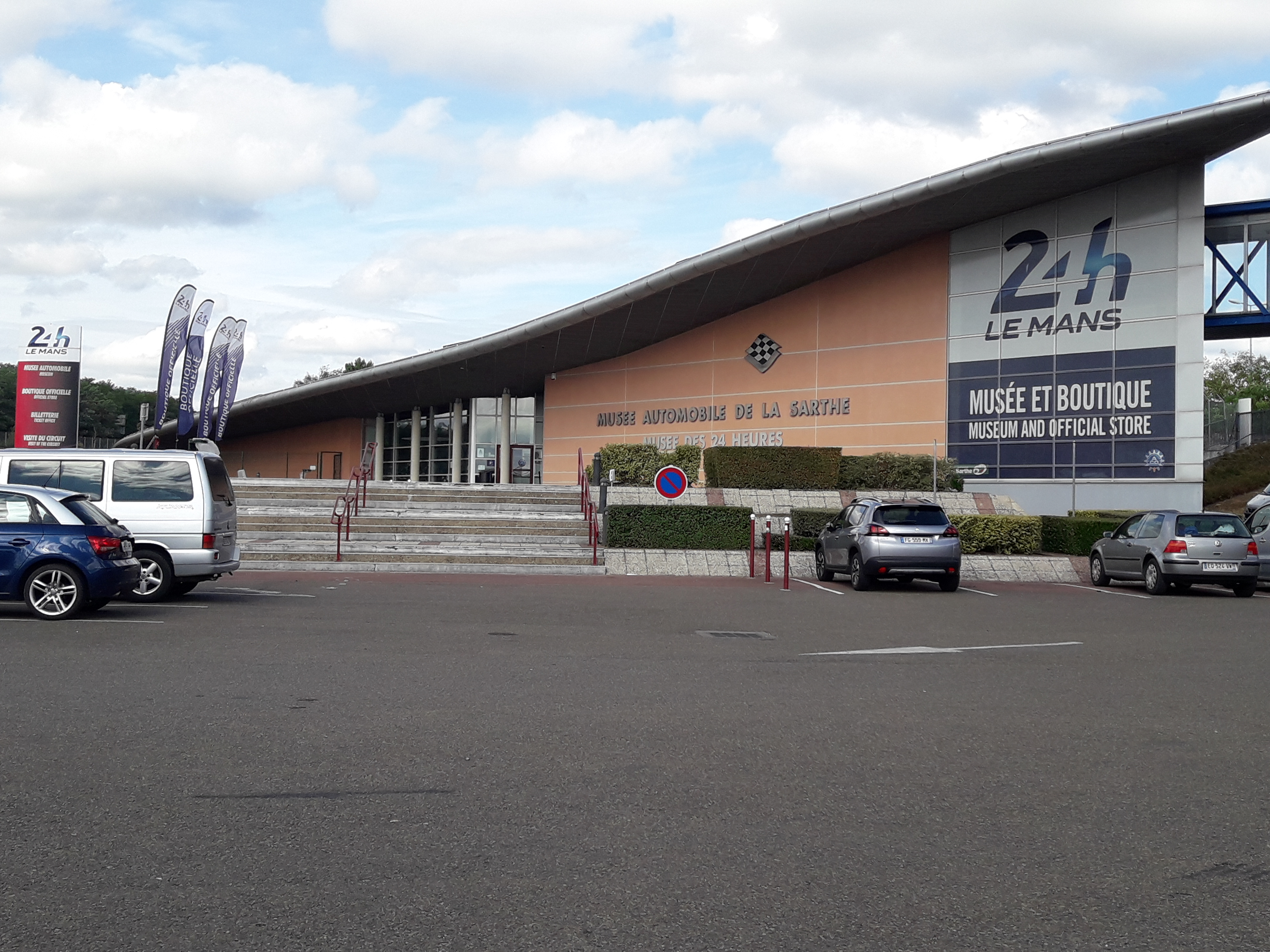
- Established: 1961; 65 years ago
- Location: Circuit des 24 Heures du Mans, 72009, Le Mans, France
- Coordinates: 47°57′25″N 0°12′31″E
- Collection size: 150 sports cars
- Visitors: 110,000
- Website: www.lemans-musee24h.com

The Museum of the 24 Hours of Le Mans (French: Musee des 24 Heures du Mans) is a motorsport museum located at the Circuit de la Sarthe in Le Mans, France. It was founded in 1961 as the Automobile Museum de la Sarthe. In 1991, it was taken over by the organizers of the 24 hours road race and moved to a purpose-built museum complex under the direction of Francis Piquera, the Executive Manager.

In 2009, the museum was extensively renovated. Its permanent exhibition includes over 100 historic cars, many collectibles, dozens of films and archive photographs. The museum tour is organized around six major sequences that showcase the important figures of the 24 Hour race and origins of the Le Mans automotive industry, tracing the evolution of the car in the twentieth century.

With their models of one of the most important endurance races in the world, 350m² of temporary exhibitions complete the exhibition.

A visit of the famous circuit of the 24 Hours of Le Mans race is possible.

== Collection ==
=== Historic cars ===
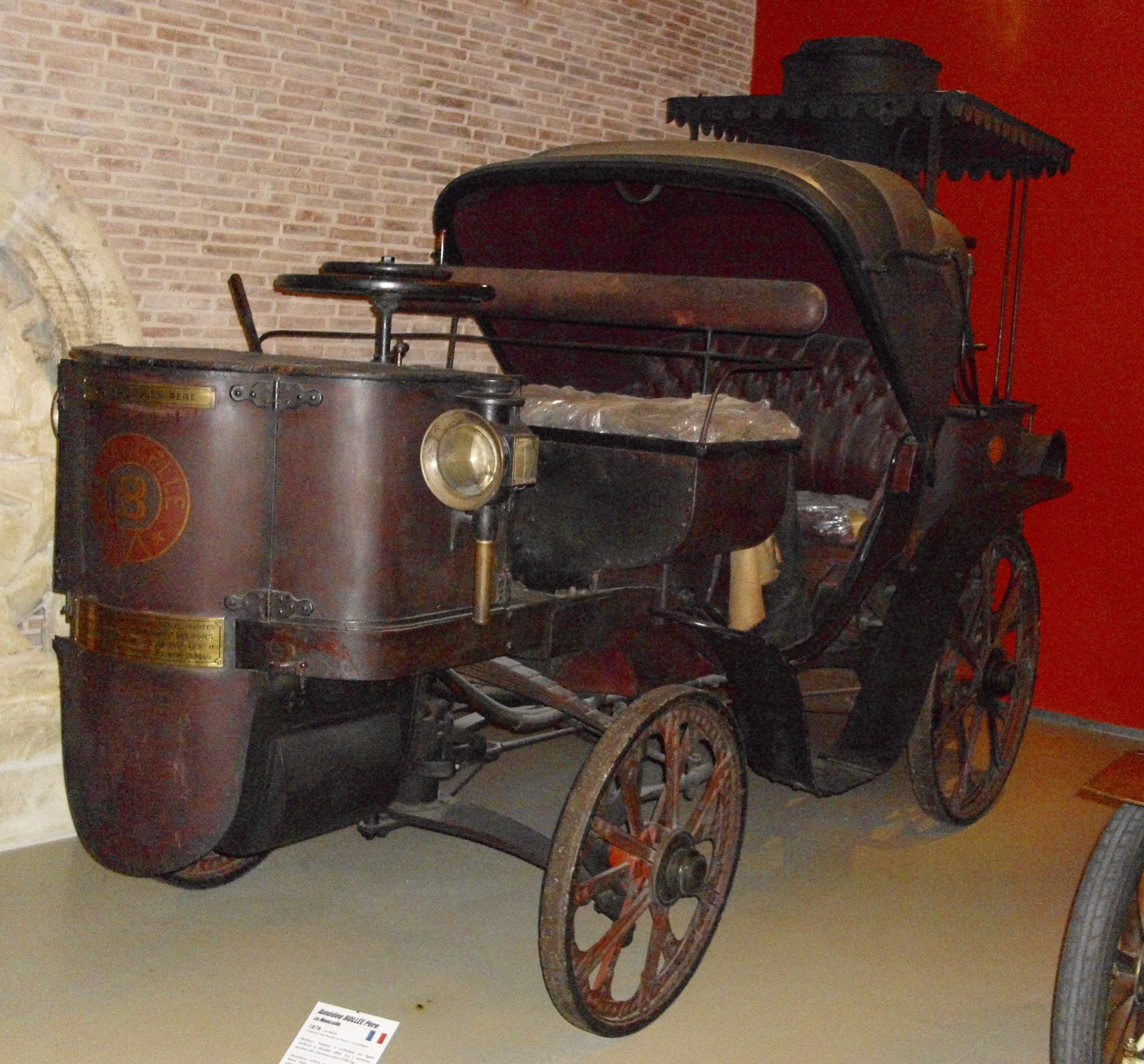
La Mancelle 1878

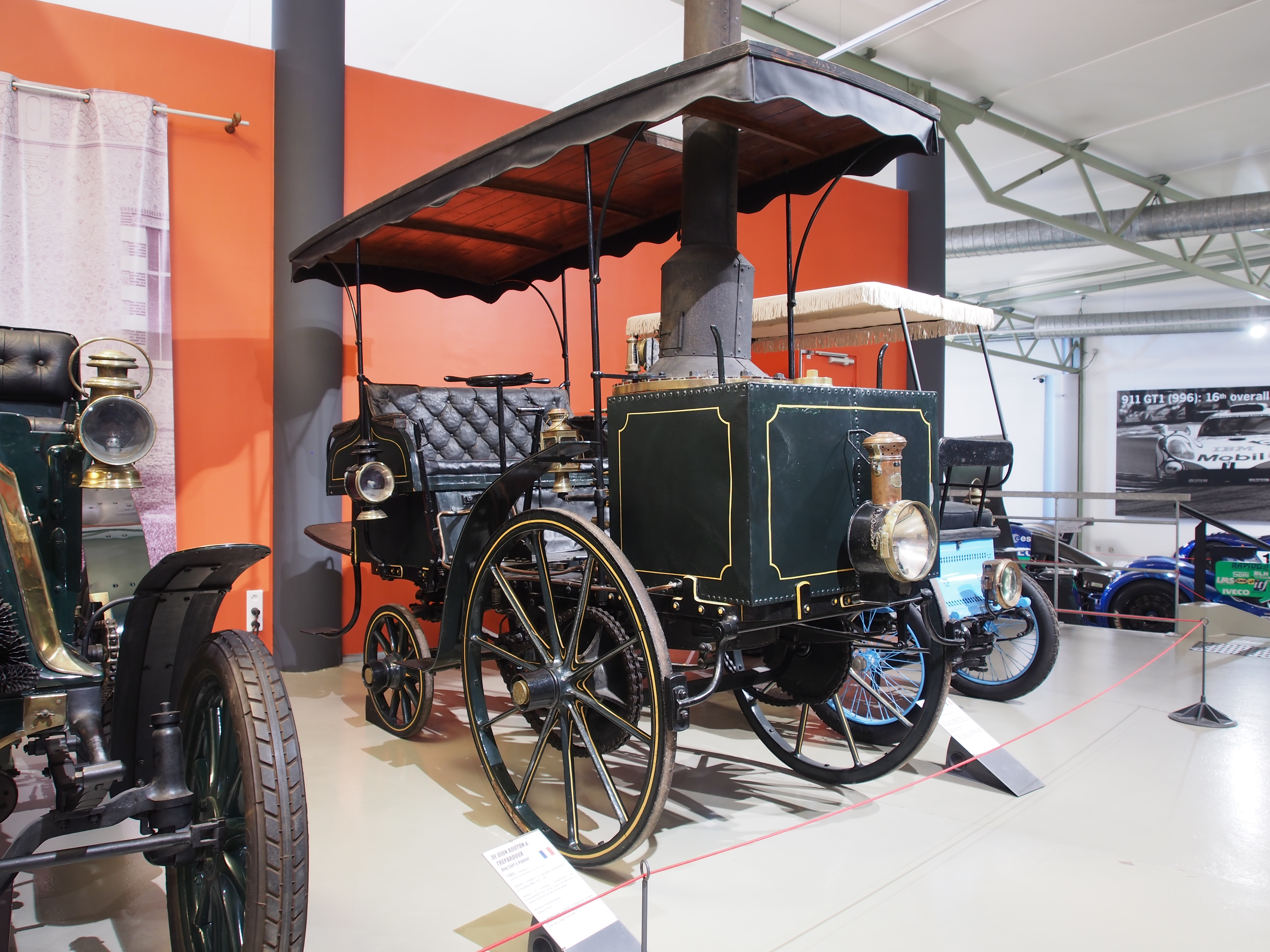
De Dion Bouton & Trepardoux Dog Cart a Vapeur

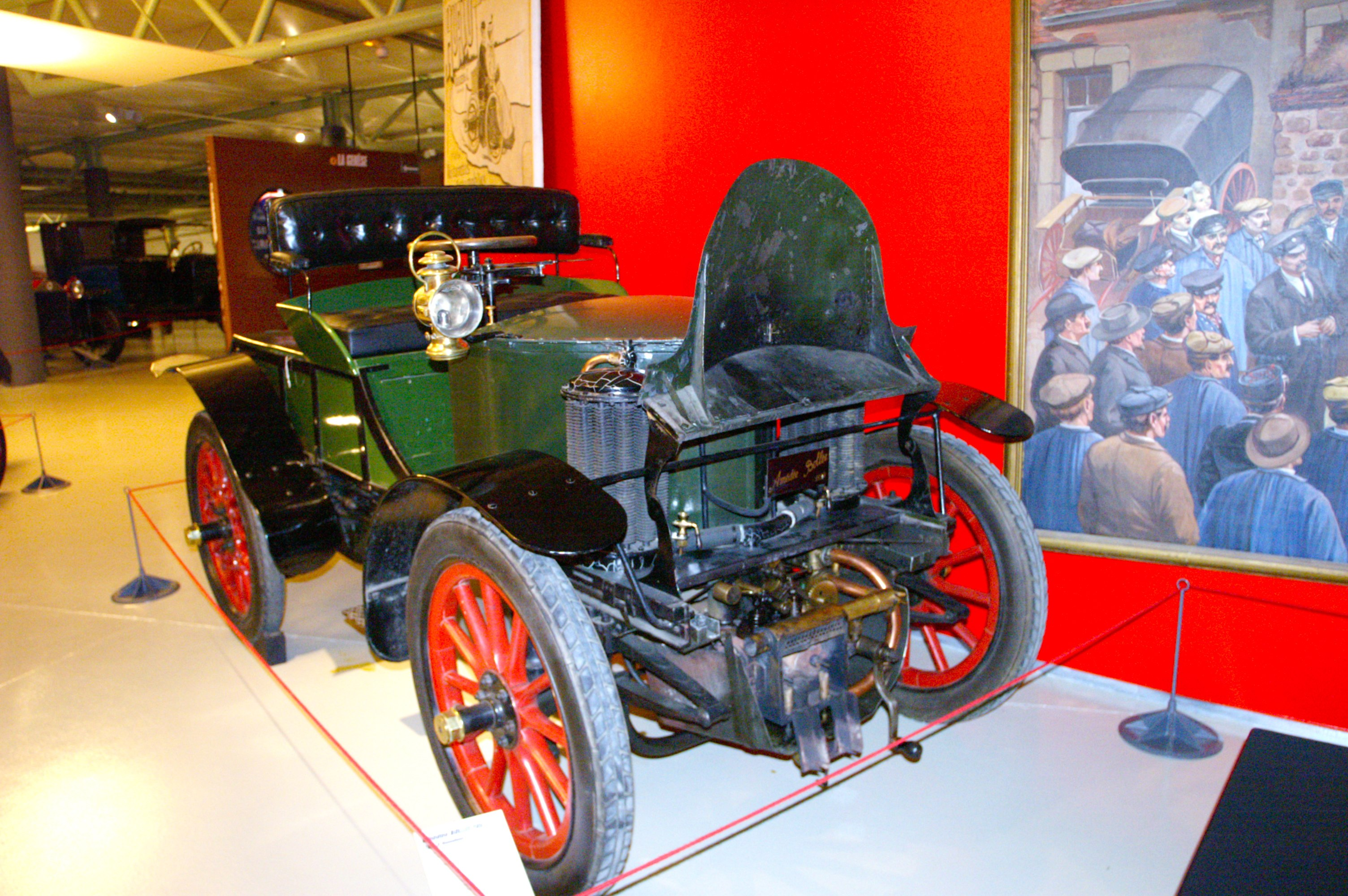
Amedee Bollee Type D Runabout

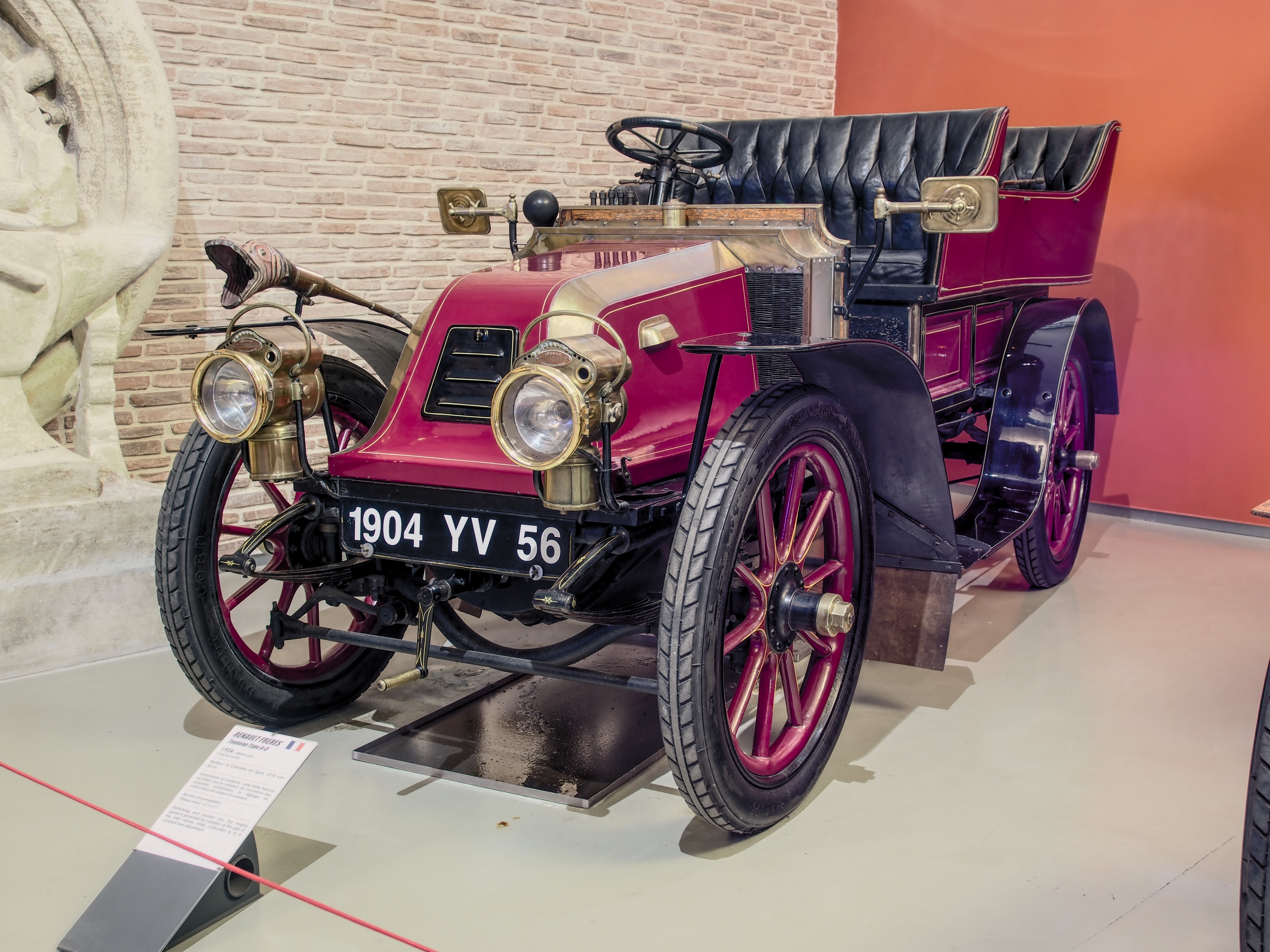
1904 Renault Freres Tonneau Type U-D 4cyl 3770 cm^{3}

=== Local cars ===
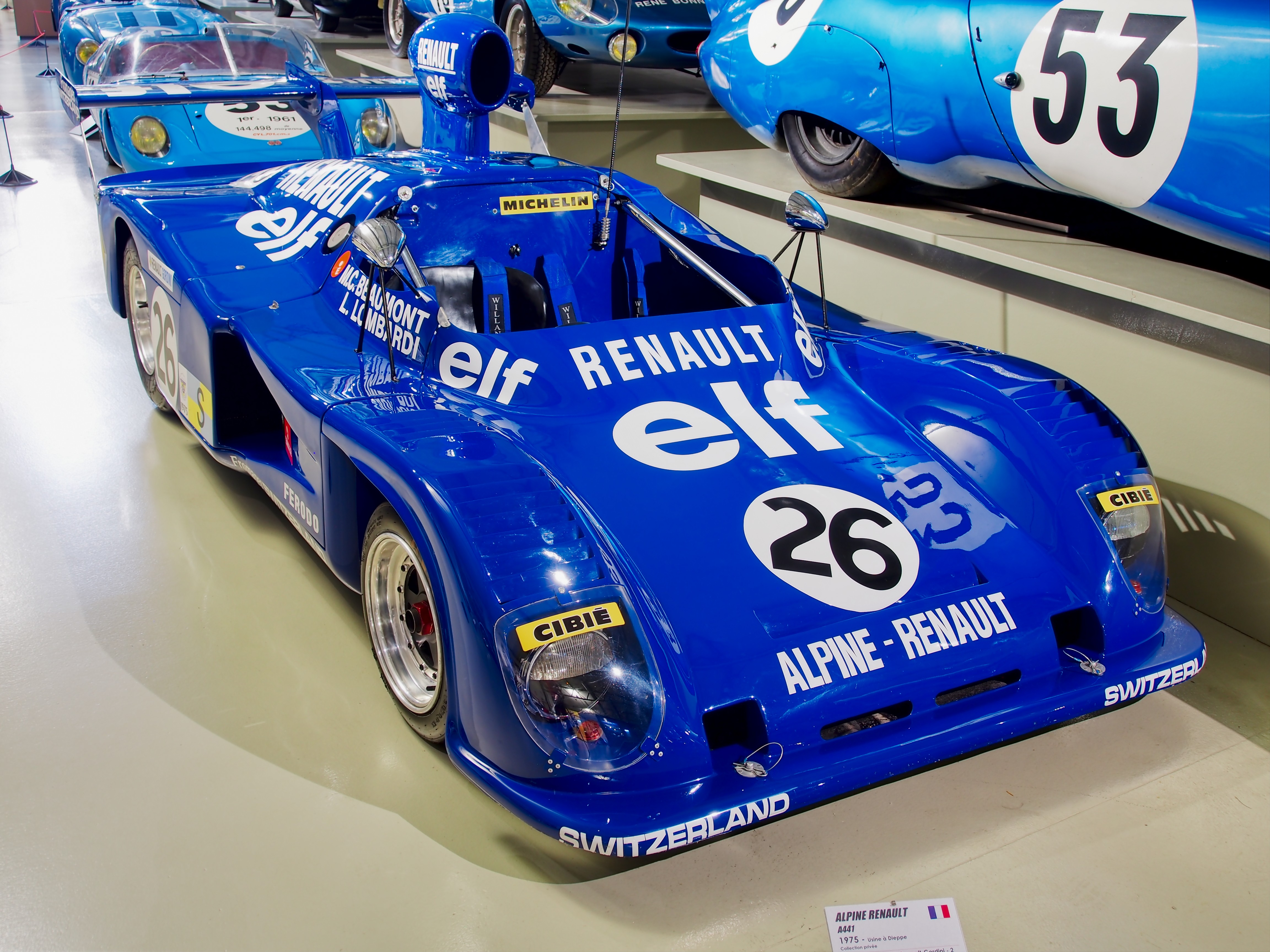
1975 Alpine Renault A441 Renault-Gordini V6 2ACT 1997 cm^{3}

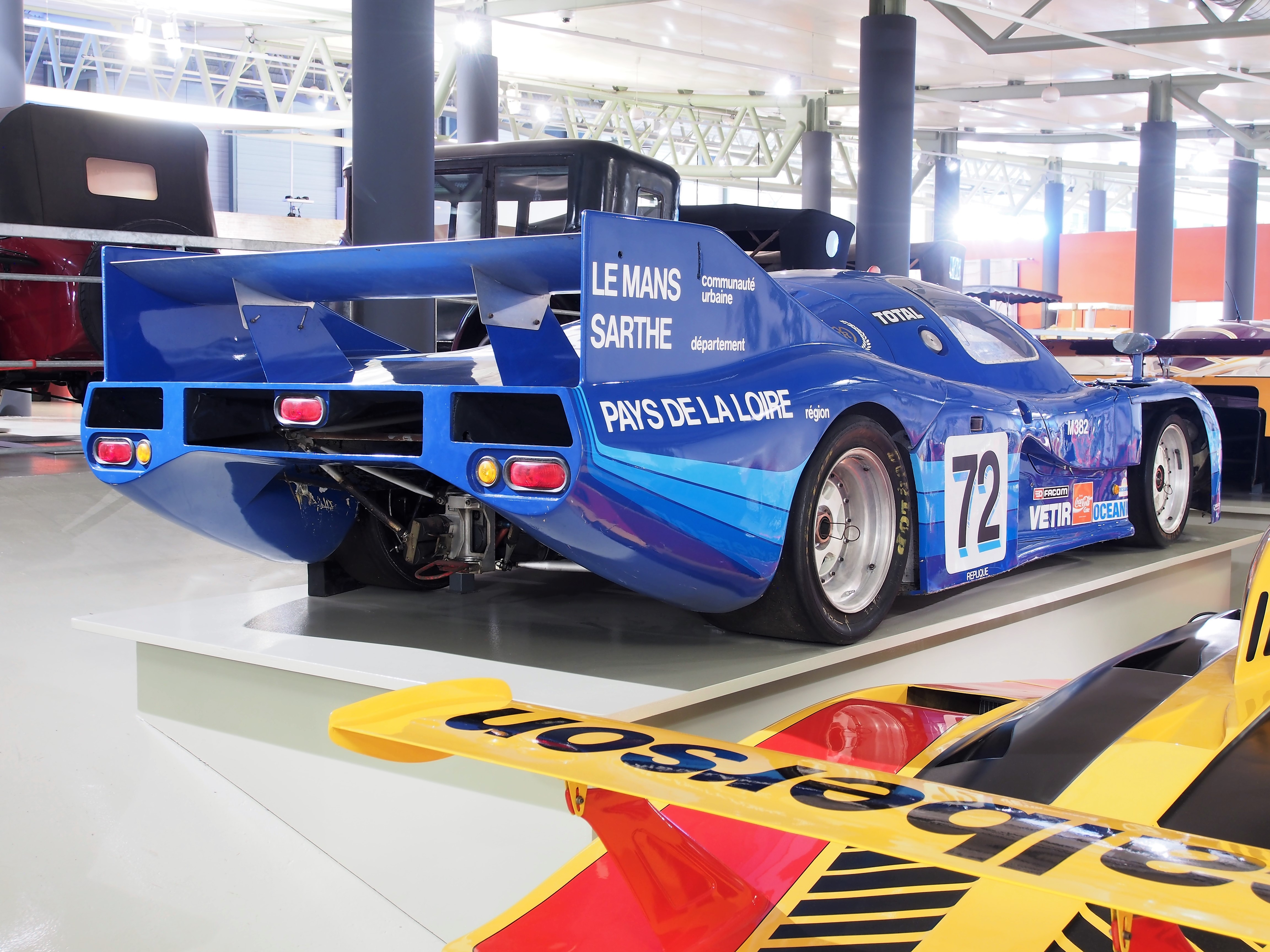
Rondeau-M382-Cosworth

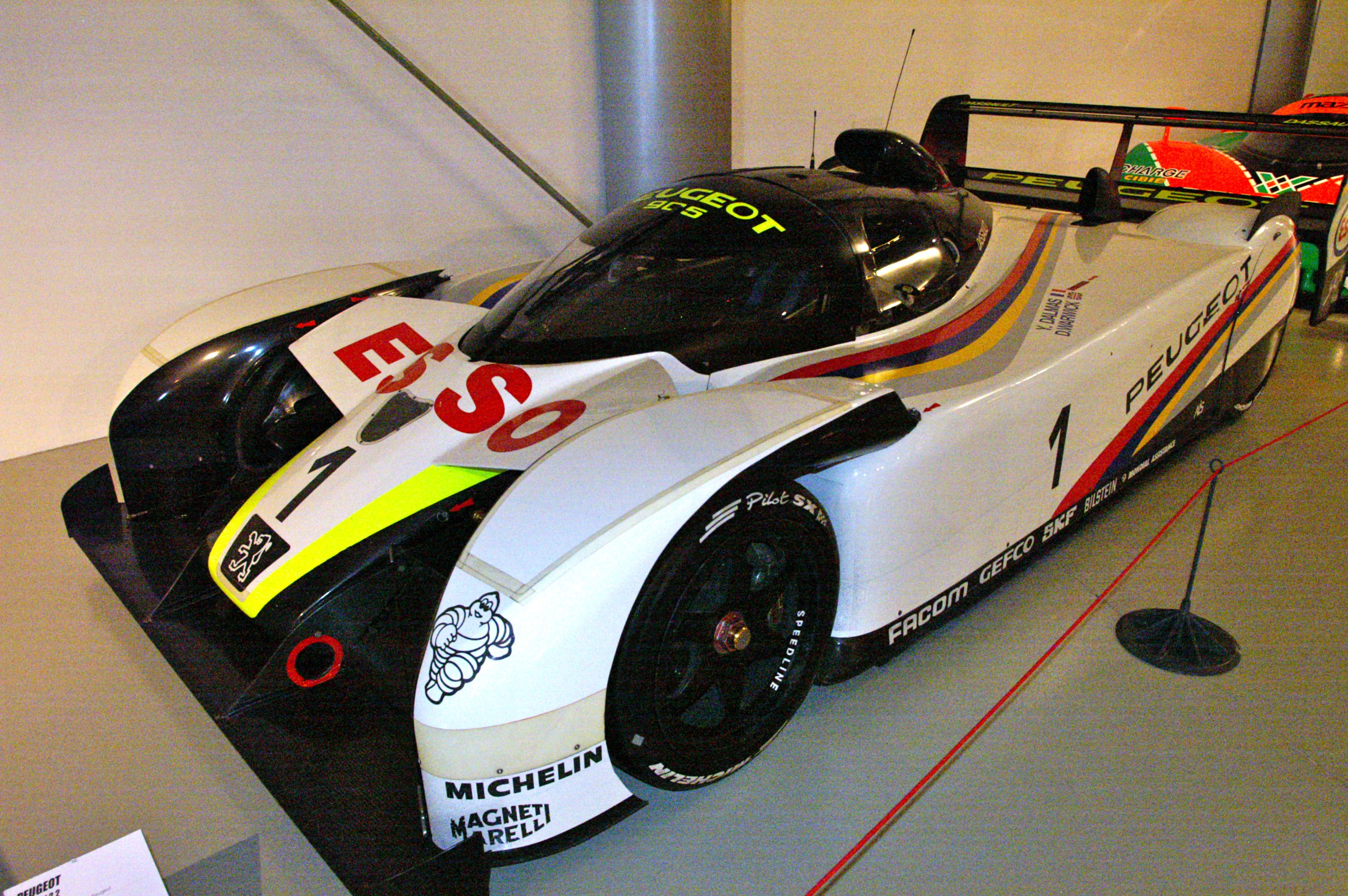
Peugeot 905 Evo2

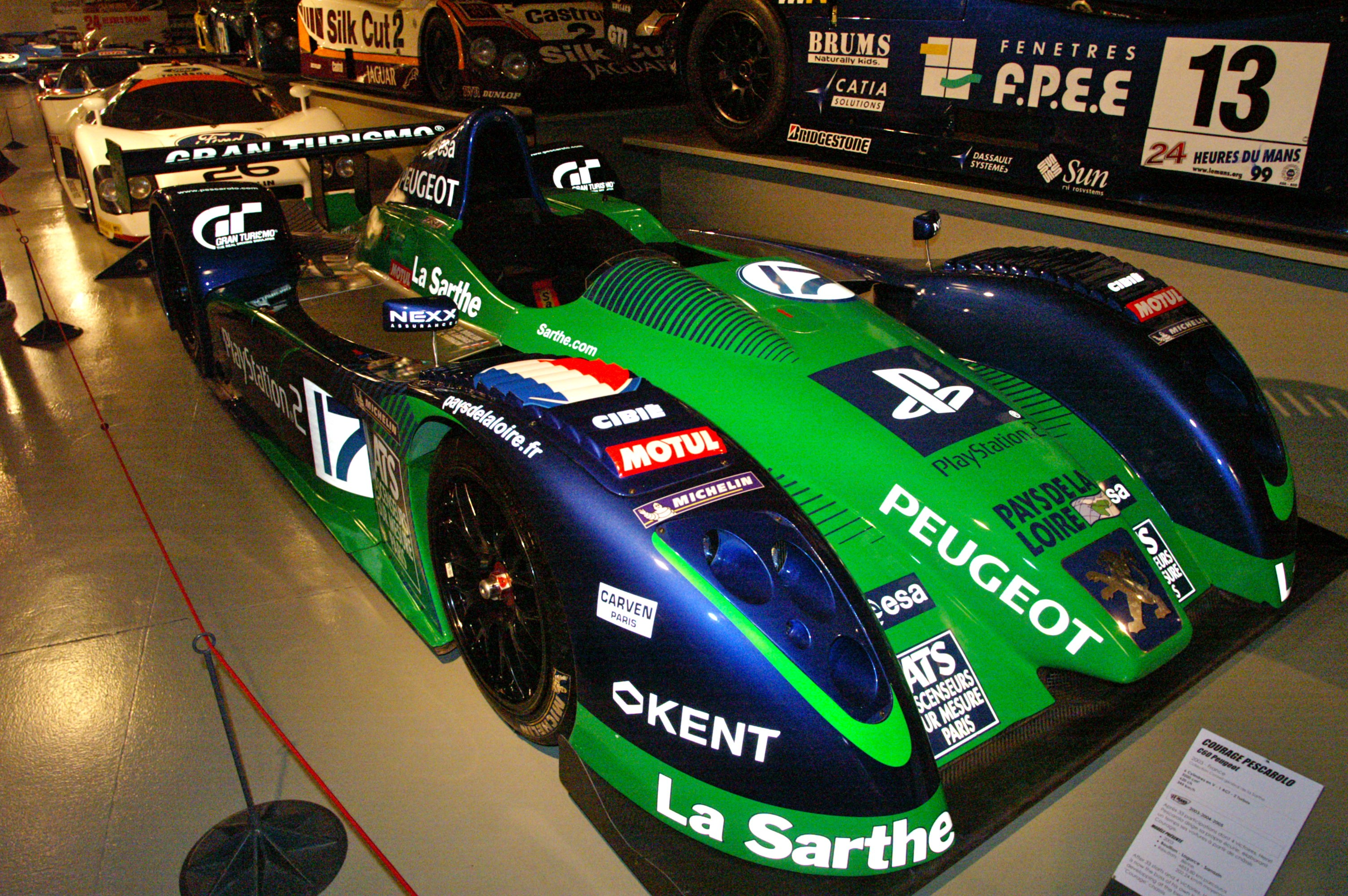
Pescarolo C60

=== Modern cars ===
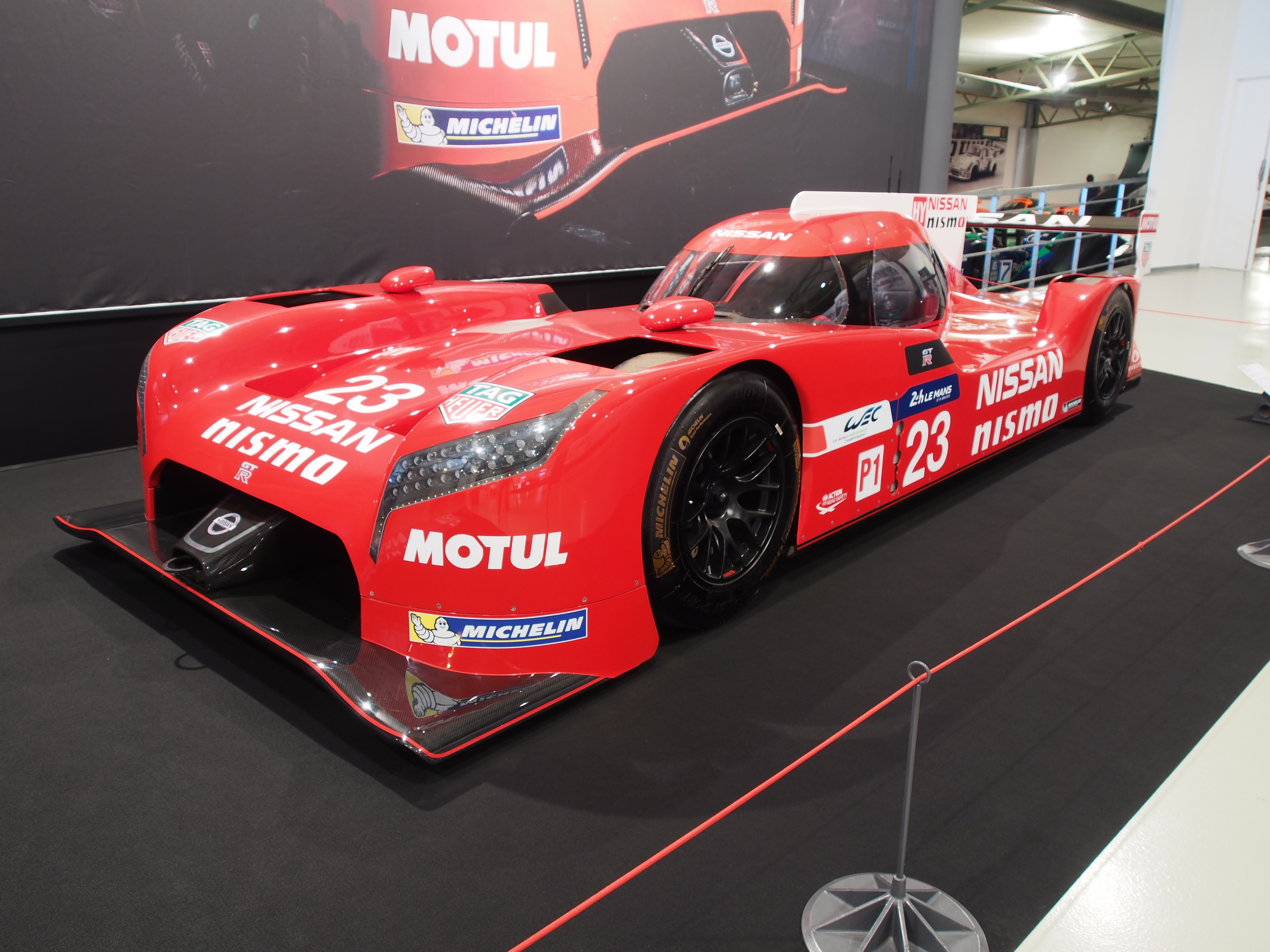
2015 Nissan GT-R LM Nismo V6 3000 cm^{3}

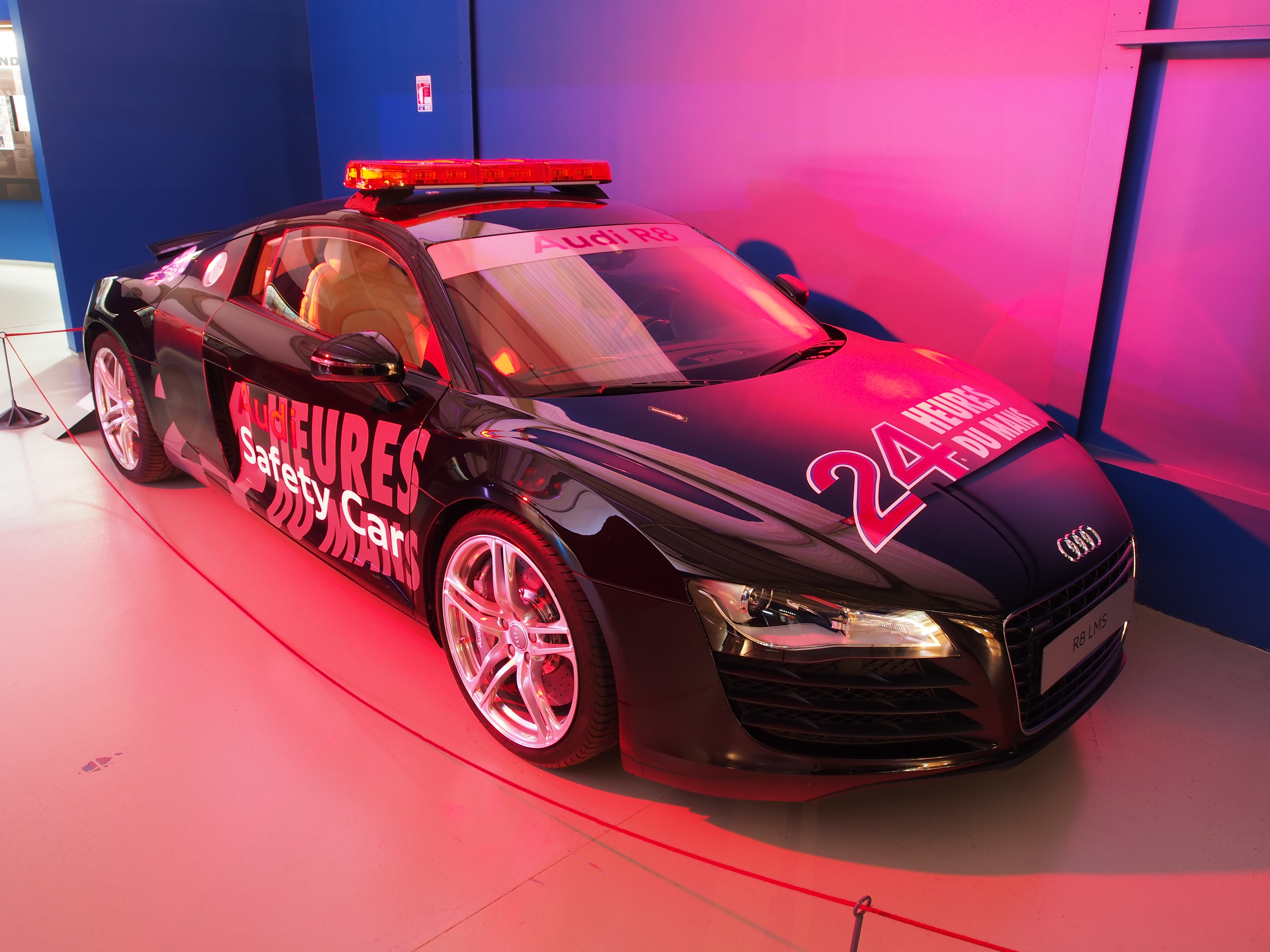
Audi R8 Safety Car 24 heures du Mans

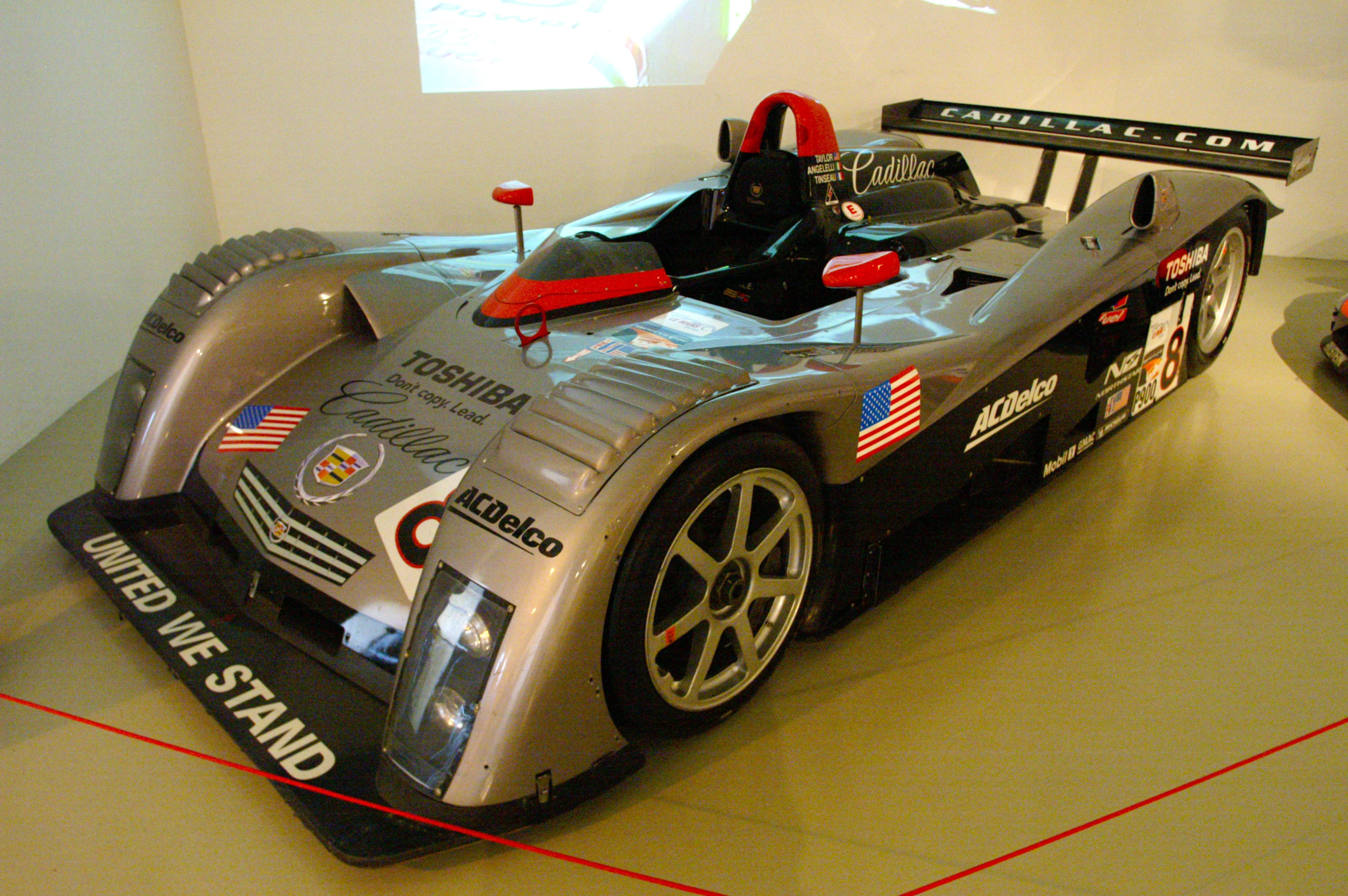
Cadilac Northstar LMP 900

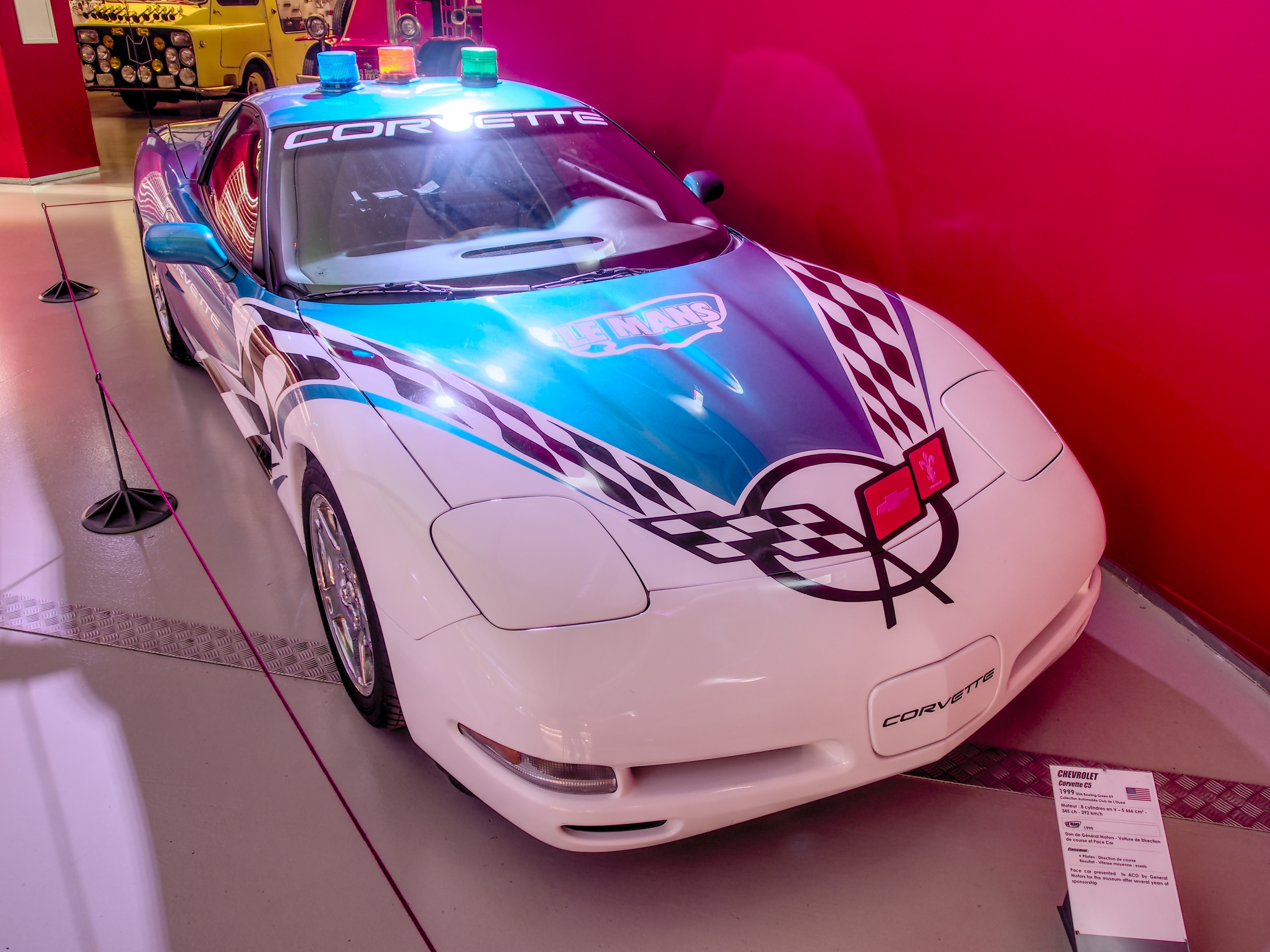
1999 Chevrolet Corvette C5 V8 5666 cm^{3}

== See also ==
- Circuit de la Sarthe
