= Paul Lanchère =

French racing driver (born 1991)

- Lanchère (left) at Silverstone Circuit in 2026
- Nationality: (France) French
- Born: 30 September 1991 (age 35) Saint-Doulchard, France
- Categorisation: FIA Silver (until 2023); FIA Bronze (2024–)

Championship titles
- 2025–2026 2025–26: European Le Mans Series – LMP3; Asian Le Mans Series – LMP3

Paul Lanchère (born 30 September 1991) is a French racing driver who last competed for CLX Motorsport in the LMP3 class of the European Le Mans Series.

== Career ==
Lanchère made his single-seater debut in 2009, by racing in the FFSA Academy-centrally run Formul'Academy Euro Series. Spending two years in the series, he scored seven podiums across both years as he ended the seasons ninth and seventh in points, respectively. After leaving single-seaters at the end of 2010, Lanchère made sporadic appearances in the Blancpain Endurance Series between 2011 and 2014. Following that, Lanchère began working as a driver coach and development driver for LSP by Nevers Magny-Cours. Five years after his last appearance in the Blancpain Endurance Series, Lanchère made a one-off appearance in the Ultimate Cup Series at Mugello for Graff Racing.

After a four-year hiatus from racing, Lanchère was downgraded to a bronze categorisation and joined VSF Sports to race in the 2024 French GT4 Cup alongside Natan Bihel. In his only season in the championship, Lanchère took a best result of fourth in race two at Lédenon and finished ninth in the Pro-Am standings. In May, Lanchère made a guest appearance in the JS2 R class of the Ligier European Series at Le Castellet. In his only round in the series, Lanchère finished second in both races. Two months later, Lanchère made a one-off appearance for Ultimate in the Imola round of the European Le Mans Series. On his LMP3 debut, Lanchère led his stint and finished third in class.

Lanchère made the full-time switch to LMP3 the following year, joining Theodor Jensen and Adrien Closmenil at CLX Motorsport for the European Le Mans Series. In the season-opening round at Barcelona, Lanchère scored his first win in LMP3 competition, before dominating the following round at Le Castellet from pole position. At Imola, Lanchère and his teammates overcame an early penalty to win for the third consecutive time. However, the win streak came to an end at Spa, as the CLX crew served multiple penalties. The trio ran as high as third following the penalties, but while chasing second-placed Ian Aguilera, Closmenil went off course and stopped the car, with the team suffering its first retirement of the season. This was rendered irrelevant at Silverstone, where a dominant performance allowed Lanchère, Closmenil and Jensen to win the championship with a race to spare, before closing out a commanding campaign with their fifth victory from six races.

At the end of the year, Lanchère remained with CLX to race in the LMP3 class of the 2025–26 Asian Le Mans Series. In the six-race season, Lanchère qualified on pole in every race, as well as taking wins at Sepang and Abu Dhabi to secure the class title. For the rest of 2026, Lanchère remained with CLX for his second full-time season in the European Le Mans Series alongside Alexander Jacoby and Bruno Ribeiro. After a quiet start to the season, Lanchère won at Imola and inherited the win at Spa following the addition of Louis Iglesias to the lineup, in place of Ribeiro, before winning the finale at Algarve to seal his second consecutive LMP3 title.

== Karting record ==
=== Karting career summary ===
| Season | Series | Team | Position |
|---|---|---|---|
| 2007 | Formula Kart France | | NC |
| 2008 | Rotax Euro Challenge – Rotax Max | Kart Runner | 25th |
| 2008 | Bridgestone Cup – Rotax Max | | NC |
| 2008 | Challenge Rotax Max France – Rotax Max | | 16th |

== Racing record ==
=== Racing career summary ===
| Season | Series | Team | Races | Wins | Poles | F/Laps | Podiums | Points | Position |
|---|---|---|---|---|---|---|---|---|---|
| 2009 | Formul'Academy Euro Series | FFSA Academy | 14 | 0 | 0 | 0 | 1 | 37 | 9th |
| 2010 | F4 Eurocup 1.6 | FFSA Academy | 14 | 0 | 0 | 0 | 6 | 89 | 6th |
| 2011 | Blancpain Endurance Series – GT3 Gentlemen Trophy | Sport Garage | 0 | 0 | 0 | 0 | 0 | 0 | NC |
| 2012 | Blancpain Endurance Series – Pro-Am Cup | Sport Garage | 2 | 0 | 0 | 0 | 0 | 0 | NC |
| 2014 | Blancpain Endurance Series – Gentlemen Trophy | Duqueine Engineering | 2 | 0 | 0 | 0 | 0 | 28 | 15th |
| 2019 | Ultimate Cup Series – Challenge Proto P4 | Graff Racing | 1 | 0 | 0 | 0 | 0 | 0 | **2nd** |
| 2024 | French GT4 Cup – Pro-Am | VSF Sports - Amplitude Automobiles | 12 | 0 | 0 | 1 | 0 | 67 | 9th |
| 2024 | Ligier European Series – JS2 R | Pegasus Racing | 2 | 0 | 0 | 1 | 2 | 0 | NC |
| 2024 | European Le Mans Series – LMP3 | Ultimate | 1 | 0 | 0 | 0 | 1 | 15 | 16th |
| 2025 | European Le Mans Series – LMP3 | CLX Motorsport | 6 | 5 | 3 | 0 | 5 | 130 | **1st** |
| 2025 | European Endurance Prototype Cup | DB Autosport | 1 | 0 | 0 | 0 | 0 | 0.5 | 62nd |
| 2025–26 | Asian Le Mans Series – LMP3 | CLX Motorsport | 6 | 2 | 2 | 1 | 4 | 96 | **1st** |
| 2026 | European Le Mans Series – LMP3 | CLX Motorsport | 6 | 3 | 0 | 0 | 4 | 110 | **1st** |
| 2026 | European Endurance Prototype Cup | DB Autosport by MB Performance | 1 | 0 | 0 | 0 | 0 | 0* | NC* |

*Season still in progress.

=== Complete F4 Eurocup 1.6 results ===
(key) (Races in bold indicate pole position; races in italics indicate fastest lap)

| Year | 1 | 2 | 3 | 4 | 5 | 6 | 7 | 8 | 9 | 10 | 11 | 12 | 13 | 14 | Pos | Points |
|---|---|---|---|---|---|---|---|---|---|---|---|---|---|---|---|---|
| 2009 | VAL; 1; 10 | VAL; 2; 11 | PAU; 1; 6 | PAU; 2; 2 | OSC; 1 Ret | OSC; 2 Ret | SPA; 1; 10 | SPA; 2; 9 | MAG; 1; 8 | MAG; 2; 6 | MNZ; 1; 5 | MNZ; 2 Ret | ALC; 1; 16 | ALC; 2; 9 | 9th | 37 |
| 2010 | ALC; 1; 3 | ALC; 2; 2 | SPA; 1; 2 | SPA; 2; 3 | MAG; 1; 12 | MAG; 2 Ret | HUN; 1; 3 | HUN; 2; 3 | HOC; 1; 8 | HOC; 2; 5 | SIL; 1; 5 | SIL; 2; 5 | CAT; 1; 10 | CAT; 2; 8 | 6th | 89 |

=== Complete GT World Challenge Europe results ===
==== GT World Challenge Europe Endurance Cup ====
(key) (Races in bold indicate pole position) (Races in italics indicate fastest lap)

| Year | Team | Car | Class | 1 | 2 | 3 | 4 | 5 | 6 | 7 | 8 | Pos. | Points |
|---|---|---|---|---|---|---|---|---|---|---|---|---|---|
| 2011 | Sport Garage | Ferrari 430 Scuderia GT3 | GT3 Gentlemen | MNZ | NAV | SPA; 6H | SPA; 12H | SPA; 24H | MAG | SIL; WD | | NC | 0 |
| 2012 | Sport Garage | Ferrari 458 Italia GT3 | Pro-Am | MNZ | SIL | LEC | SPA; 6H | SPA; 12H | SPA; 24H | NÜR; 24 | NAV; 22 | NC | 0 |
| 2014 | Duqueine Engineering | Ferrari 458 Italia GT3 | Gentlemen | MNZ | SIL | LEC; 25 | SPA; 6H; 48 | SPA; 12H; 39 | SPA; 24H; 30 | NÜR | | 15th | 28 |

=== Complete European Le Mans Series results ===
(key) (Races in bold indicate pole position; results in italics indicate fastest lap)

| Year | Entrant | Class | Chassis | Engine | 1 | 2 | 3 | 4 | 5 | 6 | Rank | Points |
|---|---|---|---|---|---|---|---|---|---|---|---|---|
| 2024 | Ultimate | LMP3 | Ligier JS P320 | Nissan VK56DE 5.6L V8 | CAT | LEC | IMO; 3 | SPA | MUG | ALG | 16th | 15 |
| 2025 | CLX Motorsport | LMP3 | Ligier JS P325 | Toyota V35A 3.5 L V6 | **CAT**; 1 | **LEC**; 1 | **IMO**; 1 | **SPA**; Ret | SIL; 1 | **ALG**; 1 | 1st | 130 |
| 2026 | CLX Motorsport | LMP3 | Ligier JS P325 | Toyota V35A 3.5 L V6 | CAT; 8 | LEC; 5 | IMO; 1 | SPA; 1 | SIL; 2 | ALG; 1 | 1st | 110 |

^{*} Season still in progress.

=== Complete Asian Le Mans Series results ===
(key) (Races in bold indicate pole position) (Races in italics indicate fastest lap)

| Year | Team | Class | Car | Engine | 1 | 2 | 3 | 4 | 5 | 6 | Pos. | Points |
|---|---|---|---|---|---|---|---|---|---|---|---|---|
| 2025–26 | CLX Motorsport | LMP3 | Ligier JS P325 | Toyota V35A 3.5 L V6 | **SEP**; **1**; 3 | **SEP**; **2**; 1 | **DUB**; **1**; 5 | **DUB**; **2**; 3 | **ABU**; **1**; 1 | **ABU**; **2** Ret | 1st | 96 |
