= James Allen (racing driver) =

Australian racing driver (born 1996)

- Allen at Silverstone Circuit in 2026.
- Nationality: (Australia) Australian
- Born: 4 July 1996 (age 30) Perth, Australia

IMSA SportsCar Championship career
- Debut season: 2019
- Current team: G-Drive Racing by APR
- Categorisation: FIA Silver (until 2019); FIA Gold (2020–)
- Car number: 69
- Former teams: DragonSpeed
- Starts: 1
- Championships: 0
- Wins: 0
- Poles: 1
- Fastest laps: 0
- Best finish: 13th in 2019
- Finished last season: 13th (30 pts)

Previous series
- 2014–15 2014–16 2016 2019: Formula Renault 2.0 Alps; Formula Renault 2.0 Eurocup; Formula Renault 2.0 NEC; TCR Australia Touring Car Series

James Allen (born 4 July 1996) is a professional racing driver from Australia. He currently competes in the European Le Mans Series. Allen has been a regular of LMP2 prototype racing since 2017, winning the 2023 European Le Mans Series with Algarve Pro Racing. He also won the LMP2 class at the 2023 24 Hours of Daytona in a photo finish.

== Career ==
=== Junior formulae ===
Having won several karting titles in Australia, Allen made his single-seater debut by racing in the 2013 Formula BMW Talent Cup. In 2014, Allen contested a double programme of the Formula Renault 2.0 Alps Series and Eurocup Formula Renault 2.0. Driving for ARTA Engineering in both series, Allen scored just a lone points finish in the Alps Series. He returned to both championships with ARTA in 2015, managing to finish 11th in the Alps Series and 17th in the Eurocup.

Ahead of 2016, Allen moved to JD Motorsport. He once again scored a lone top ten finish in the Eurocup, placing him 17th overall again. In the Northern European Cup, which Allen raced in alongside his Eurocup commitments, he scored his maiden podium in the category at Spa-Francorchamps. At the season finale in Hockenheim, Allen won race 3.

=== First prototype success, top class debut (2017–19) ===
Allen entered the European Le Mans Series in 2017, joining Graff Racing in the LMP2 class. Having scored points in all of the opening four races, the trio of Allen, Richard Bradley and Gustavo Yacamán claimed a closely-fought victory at the 4 Hours of Spa-Francorchamps, with Allen passing fellow silver-ranked Will Owen for the lead during hour 2. They then won at the Portimão season finale to secure third in the standings. Allen also made his debut in the 24 Hours of Le Mans during 2017, finishing fifth in the LMP2 class alongside Bradley and Franck Matelli despite beaching the car during the morning.

Heading into the 2018 ELMS season, Allen remained at Graff, driving for the G-Drive Racing-branded No. 40. With multiple teammate changes affecting the entry's season, Allen dropped to 15th in the drivers' standings. He retired from that year's Le Mans 24 Hours after a nighttime crash by co-driver José Gutiérrez. Towards the end of 2018, Allen made his FIA World Endurance Championship debut in the top class, LMP1. Driving for DragonSpeed, Allen retired at Fuji before finishing sixth at Shanghai alongside Ben Hanley and Renger van der Zande.

Allen remained at DragonSpeed for the 2019 ELMS season, partnering Hanley and bronze-ranked Henrik Hedman. With a strong performance at the opening round, which included him setting the fastest lap and passing Roman Rusinov for the race lead, Allen led the No. 21 crew to victory at Le Castellet. The team scored points throughout all of the other five races, taking a best finish of fourth at Silverstone from the remaining races. These results earned DragonSpeed fifth in the teams' standings.

=== Regular ELMS podiums (2020–2021) ===
Ahead of 2020, Allen received a license update to become categorised as an FIA Gold driver. In the ELMS, he returned to Graff to partner Thomas Laurent and silver-ranked Alexandre Cougnaud. The trio finished second at Spa and third at Le Castellet, where Laurent made a late overtake on Will Stevens. They ended the season fifth in the teams' standings, having scored points in every weekend.

Allen switched teams in 2021, joining Will Stevens and silver Julien Canal at Panis Racing. After testing positive for COVID-19 prior to round 1 at Barcelona, Allen was replaced by Gabriel Aubry. He returned in time for round 2. At round 4 in Monza, Allen and his teammates combined to score Panis's first victory in the ELMS. They also finished third at Spa on their way to third in the teams' championship.

=== Title success at Algarve Pro (2022–2023) ===
Heading into 2022, Allen contested a double programme with Algarve Pro Racing in both the FIA WEC and ELMS, racing in the LMP2 Pro-Am subclass in both series. In the former, Allen, alongside teammates René Binder and Steven Thomas, claimed two subclass wins on his way to second place overall. This included a subclass victory at Le Mans. In the latter meanwhile, three podiums placed the team of Allen, Alex Peroni, and John Falb fifth in the six-car subclass.

At the start of 2023, Allen joined Proton Competition at the 24 Hours of Daytona. Allen proved to be the deciding factor late in the race: having passed Matthieu Vaxivière for second, Allen chased down former teammate Ben Hanley and passed him at the line to claim the win; the margin of victory read 0.016 seconds. In addition, Allen raced in the Asian Le Mans Series with Algarve Pro in February 2023. Despite a spin from teammate Falb, Allen was able to take victory at the opening race in Dubai thanks to a quick final pit stop. After a puncture in race 2, they finished fourth. A late crash from Kyffin Simpson, Allen's other teammate, lost the team a potential podium spot in race 1 at Abu Dhabi, meanwhile another fourth in race 2 left the team third in the championship.

For his main campaign in the ELMS, Allen joined Simpson and Cadillac Hypercar driver Alex Lynn at Algarve Pro. At round 2 in Le Castellet, a late-race overtake from Allen on Louis Delétraz resulted in the No. 25 scoring victory. The team then finished third at Aragón, putting themselves firmly in title contention. They then took the championship lead at Spa, having stayed clean during a chaotic race. The double-header season finale yielded two second places for the team, enough to confirm Allen and his teammates as ELMS champions. Allen also recaptured his LMP2 Pro-Am victory at Le Mans that year, dominating alongside Colin Braun and George Kurtz.

=== Further LMP2 victories, GT3 debut (2024–present) ===
Allen moved to Duqueine Team for the 2024 ELMS season. Partnering category rookies Jean-Baptiste Simmenauer and Niels Koolen, Allen experienced a challenging season, as Duqueine finished 13th of 14 teams in the standings. Allen and the team also retired from the 24 Hours of Le Mans. Towards year's end, Allen joined new team RD Limited in the 2024–25 Asian Le Mans Series. At the first race in Sepang, Allen took the lead from Matthieu Vaxivière during the third hour, before co-driver Tristan Vautier fended off the category veteran on the final lap to claim victory. They finished second in race 2. Sixth in race 1 at Dubai was followed by another second place in race 2, teeing up a title decider with just three points splitting RD Limited and points leader Algarve Pro. The latter ended up clinching the title in Abu Dhabi, as Allen and his teammates secured second in the championship with a podium in race 2. More success came Allen's way at the start of 2025: racing for United Autosports alongside Paul di Resta, Rasmus Lindh, and Dan Goldburg, Allen won the Daytona 24 Hours after original winners Tower Motorsports were disqualified.

During the 2025 season, Allen split his attention between an ELMS campaign with Nielsen Racing in the LMP2 Pro-Am class and a drive in the GT World Challenge Europe Endurance Cup, where he made his GT3 debut at Optimum Motorsport. Driving in the Gold Cup class in the latter alongside Mikey Porter and Largim Ali, Allen finished sixth in the class standings after scoring points in all five races. In the ELMS, Allen scored a single class victory, coming second overall at Le Castellet after profiting from a successful tyre strategy that helped bronze-ranked teammate Anthony Wells to take the lead early on. With another podium, third at Portimão, the team finished seventh in the eight-car championship. Allen once again partook in the Asian Le Mans Series during the winter, scoring two podiums for RD Limited to finish fifth in the standings.

Allen remained at Nielsen heading into the 2026 ELMS campaign, partnering Alex Quinn and bronze-ranked Kriton Lendoudis. At round 2 in Le Castellet, the trio claimed Pro-Am class victory after a penalty for AF Corse and a late pit stop for CLX Motorsport.

== Racing record ==
=== Karting career summary ===
Season	Series	Position
2011	Australian National Sprint Kart Champiosnhip - Junior National Heavy	12th
2011	Australian National Sprint Kart Champiosnhip - Junior Clubman	24th
2011	Northern Territory Karting Championship - Junior Rotax	**2nd**
2011	Northern Territory Karting Championship - National Heavy	**3rd**
2012	Australian National Sprint Kart Champiosnhip - Junior National Heavy	29th
2012	SKUSA SuperNationals XVI - TaG Senior	52nd
2012	Northern Territory Karting Championship - National Heavy	**2nd**
2012	Australian Non Gearbox Nationals - Junior	**3rd**
2012	West Australian Kart Championship - Junior Clubman	**3rd**
2012	West Australian Kart Championship - Junior National Heavy	**1st**
2012	Queensland Karting Championship - Junior National Heavy	**2nd**
2012	Australian Sprint Kart Championship - Junior National Heavy	**1st**
2012	IAME International B Final - X30	4th

=== Career summary ===
Season	Series	Team	Races	Wins	Poles	F/laps	Podiums	Points	Position
2013	Formula BMW Talent Cup	N/A	3	0	1	?	?	31	5th
2014	Formula Renault 2.0 Alps Series	ARTA Engineering	14	0	0	0	0	2	23rd
2014	Formula Renault 2.0 Eurocup	ARTA Engineering	12	0	0	0	0	0	NC
2015	Formula Renault 2.0 Alps Series	ARTA Engineering	16	0	0	0	0	48	11th
2015	Formula Renault 2.0 Eurocup	ARTA Engineering	17	0	0	0	0	10	17th
2016	Formula Renault 2.0 NEC	JD Motorsport	15	1	0	0	3	177	7th
2016	Formula Renault 2.0 Eurocup	JD Motorsport	15	0	0	0	0	11	17th
2017	European Le Mans Series - LMP2	Graff Racing	6	2	0	0	2	86	**3rd**
2017	24 Hours of Le Mans - LMP2	Graff Racing	1	0	0	0	0	N/A	5th
2018	European Le Mans Series - LMP2	G-Drive Racing	6	0	0	0	0	15.25	15th
2018	24 Hours of Le Mans - LMP2	G-Drive Racing	1	0	0	0	0	N/A	DNF
2018–19	FIA World Endurance Championship	DragonSpeed	2	0	0	0	0	0	NC
2019	European Le Mans Series - LMP2	DragonSpeed	6	2	0	1	2	48	7th
2019	IMSA SportsCar Championship - LMP2	DragonSpeed	1	0	1	0	1	30	13th
2019	TCR Australia Touring Car Series	Ashley Seward Motorsport	3	0	0	0	0	24	32nd
2020	European Le Mans Series - LMP2	Graff Racing	5	0	0	0	2	43	6th
2020	24 Hours of Le Mans - LMP2	SO24-HAS by Graff	1	0	0	0	0	N/A	DNF
2021	European Le Mans Series - LMP2	Panis Racing	5	1	0	0	1	56.5	6th
2021	24 Hours of Le Mans - LMP2	Panis Racing	1	0	0	0	1	N/A	**3rd**
2021	Le Mans Cup - LMP3	Mühlner Motorsport	1	0	0	0	0	0.5	44th
2022	FIA World Endurance Championship - LMP2	Algarve Pro Racing	6	0	0	0	0	10	19th
2022	European Le Mans Series - LMP2	Algarve Pro Racing	6	0	0	0	0	7	21st
2022	24 Hours of Le Mans - LMP2	Algarve Pro Racing	1	0	0	0	0	N/A	15th
2022	IMSA SportsCar Championship - LMP2	G-Drive Racing by APR	1	0	0	0	0	0	NC†
2023	Asian Le Mans Series - LMP2	Algarve Pro Racing	4	1	0	0	1	51	**3rd**
2023	European Le Mans Series - LMP2	Algarve Pro Racing	6	2	1	0	5	113	**1st**
2023	24 Hours of Le Mans - LMP2	Algarve Pro Racing	1	0	0	0	0	N/A	10th
2023	IMSA SportsCar Championship - LMP2	Proton Competition	1	1	0	0	1	0	NC†
2024	European Le Mans Series - LMP2	Duqueine Team	6	0	0	0	0	20	16th
2024	24 Hours of Le Mans - LMP2	Duqueine Team	1	0	0	0	0	N/A	DNF
2024	IMSA SportsCar Championship - LMP2	DragonSpeed	1	0	0	0	0	262	48th
2024–25	Asian Le Mans Series - LMP2	RD Limited	6	1	0	0	4	88	**2nd**
2025	IMSA SportsCar Championship - LMP2	United Autosports USA	1	1	0	0	1	385	41st
2025	European Le Mans Series - LMP2 Pro-Am	Nielsen Racing	6	1	0	0	2	58	8th
2025	GT World Challenge Europe Endurance Cup	Optimum Motorsport	5	0	0	0	0	0	NC
2025–26	Asian Le Mans Series - LMP2	RD Limited	6	0	0	2	2	52	5th
2026	European Le Mans Series - LMP2 Pro-Am	Nielsen Racing	6	1	0	0	1	34	10th
2026	24 Hours of Le Mans - LMP2 Pro-Am	AO by TF	1	0	0	0	1	N/A	**3rd**

^{†} Ineligible for points.

=== Complete Eurocup Formula Renault 2.0 results ===
(key) (Races in bold indicate pole position) (Races in italics indicate fastest lap)

Year	Team	1	2	3	4	5	6	7	8	9	10	11	12	13	14	15	16	17	Pos	Points
2014	ARTA Engineering	ALC; 1; 24	ALC; 2; 22	SPA; 1; 31	SPA; 2 Ret	MSC; 1	MSC; 2	NÜR; 1; 27	NÜR; 2; 25	HUN; 1; 22	HUN; 2; 22	LEC; 1; 20	LEC; 2; 17	JER; 1; 17	JER; 2; 24				27th	0
2015	ARTA Engineering	ALC; 1; 25	ALC; 2; 20	ALC; 3; 5	SPA; 1; 21	SPA; 2; 28	HUN; 1; 20	HUN; 2; 18	SIL; 1; 22	SIL; 2; 22	SIL; 3; 22	NÜR; 1; 24	NÜR; 2; 26	LMS; 1; 20	LMS; 2; 18	JER; 1; 12	JER; 2 Ret	JER; 3 Ret	17th	10
2016	JD Motorsport	ALC; 1; 17	ALC; 2; 13	ALC; 3; 17	MON; 1; 13	MNZ; 1; 19	MNZ; 2; 11	MNZ; 3; 17	RBR; 1; 12	RBR; 2; 15	LEC; 1; 13	LEC; 2; 16	SPA; 1; 5	SPA; 2 Ret	EST; 1 Ret	EST; 2; 13			17th	11

^{†} As Allen was a guest driver, he was ineligible for points.

=== Complete Formula Renault 2.0 Alps Series results ===
(key) (Races in bold indicate pole position; races in italics indicate fastest lap)

Year	Team	1	2	3	4	5	6	7	8	9	10	11	12	13	14	15	16	Pos	Points
2014	ARTA Engineering	IMO; 1; 20	IMO; 2; 24	PAU; 1; 13	PAU; 2 Ret	RBR; 1; 10	RBR; 2; 19	SPA; 1 Ret	SPA; 2; 22	MNZ; 1 Ret	MNZ; 2; 16	MUG; 1; 30	MUG; 2; 29	JER; 1 Ret	JER; 2; 15			23rd	2
2015	ARTA Engineering	IMO; 1; 15	IMO; 2; 17†	PAU; 1; 16	PAU; 2 Ret	RBR; 1; 5	RBR; 2; 9	RBR; 3; 11	SPA; 1; 11	SPA; 2 Ret	MNZ; 1; 13	MNZ; 2; 12	MNZ; 3; 4	MIS; 1; 16	MIS; 2; 14	JER; 1; 13	JER; 2; 13	11th	48

=== Complete Formula Renault 2.0 NEC results ===
(key) (Races in bold indicate pole position) (Races in italics indicate fastest lap)

Year	Entrant	1	2	3	4	5	6	7	8	9	10	11	12	13	14	15	DC	Points
2016	JD Motorsport	MNZ; 1; 14	MNZ; 2; 16	SIL; 1; 6	SIL; 2; 12	HUN; 1; 12	HUN; 2; 12	SPA; 1; 3	SPA; 2; 4	ASS; 1; 17	ASS; 2; 11	NÜR; 1; 14	NÜR; 2; 9	HOC; 1; 8	HOC; 2; 11	HOC; 3; 1	7th	177

=== Complete European Le Mans Series results ===
(key) (Races in bold indicate pole position) (Races in italics indicate fastest lap)

Year	Entrant	Class	Chassis	Engine	1	2	3	4	5	6	Rank	Points
2017	Graff	LMP2	Oreca 07	Gibson GK428 4.2 L V8	SIL; 4	MNZ; 8	RBR; 4	LEC; 6	SPA; 1	ALG; 1	3rd	86
2018	G-Drive Racing	LMP2	Oreca 07	Gibson GK428 4.2 L V8	LEC; 6	MNZ; Ret	RBR; 13	SIL; 12	SPA; 11‡	ALG; 7	15th	15.25
2019	DragonSpeed	LMP2	Oreca 07	Gibson GK428 4.2 L V8	LEC; 1	MNZ; 10	CAT; 10	**SIL**; 4	SPA; 7	ALG; 9	7th	48
2020	Graff	LMP2	Oreca 07	Gibson GK428 4.2 L V8	LEC; 9	SPA; 2	LEC; 3	MNZ; 9	ALG; 7		6th	43
2021	Panis Racing	LMP2	Oreca 07	Gibson GK428 4.2 L V8	CAT	RBR; 14	LEC; 8	MNZ; 1	SPA; 3	ALG; 4	6th	56.5
2022	Algarve Pro Racing	LMP2	Oreca 07	Gibson GK428 4.2 L V8	LEC; 17	IMO; 15	MNZ; 9	CAT; 8	SPA; 10	ALG; Ret	21st	7
2022	Algarve Pro Racing	Pro-Am Cup	Oreca 07	Gibson GK428 4.2 L V8	7	6	3	3	3	Ret	6th	59
2023	Algarve Pro Racing	LMP2	Oreca 07	Gibson GK428 4.2 L V8	CAT; 5	LEC; 1	ARA; 3	**SPA**; 1	**POR**; 2	ALG; 2	1st	113
2024	Duqueine Team	LMP2	Oreca 07	Gibson GK428 4.2 L V8	CAT; 11	LEC; 6	IMO; 9	SPA; 12	MUG; 8	ALG; 7	16th	20
2025	Nielsen Racing	LMP2 Pro-Am	Oreca 07	Gibson GK428 4.2 L V8	CAT; 7	LEC; 1	IMO; 8	SPA; Ret	SIL; 6	ALG; 3	8th	58
2026	Nielsen Racing	LMP2 Pro-Am	Oreca 07	Gibson GK428 4.2 L V8	CAT; Ret	LEC; 1	IMO; 11	SPA; 8	SIL; 10	ALG; 8	10th	34

=== Complete FIA World Endurance Championship results ===
(key) (Races in bold indicate pole position) (Races in italics indicate fastest lap)

Year	Entrant	Class	Chassis	Engine	1	2	3	4	5	6	7	8	Rank	Points
2018–19	G-Drive Racing	LMP2	Oreca 07	Gibson GK428 4.2 L V8	SPA	LMS; Ret	SIL						29th	8
2018–19	DragonSpeed	LMP1	BR Engineering BR1	Gibson GL458 4.5L V8				FUJ; Ret	SHA; 6	SEB	SPA	LMS	29th	8
2022	Algarve Pro Racing	LMP2	Oreca 07	Gibson GK428 4.2 L V8	SEB; 11	SPA; 11	LMS; 9	MNZ; 7	FUJ; 13	BHR; 12			19th	10

^{*} Season still in progress.

=== Complete 24 Hours of Le Mans results ===
Year	Team	Co-Drivers	Car	Class	Laps	Pos.	Class pos.
2017	(France) Graff Racing	(United Kingdom) Richard Bradley (France) Franck Matelli	Oreca 07-Gibson	LMP2	361	6th	5th
2018	(Russia) G-Drive Racing	(Mexico) José Gutiérrez (France) Enzo Guibbert	Oreca 07-Gibson	LMP2	197	DNF	DNF
2020	(France) SO24-HAS by Graff	(France) Vincent Capillaire (France) Charles Milesi	Oreca 07-Gibson	LMP2	357	DNF	DNF
2021	(France) Panis Racing	(France) Julien Canal (United Kingdom) Will Stevens	Oreca 07-Gibson	LMP2	362	8th	**3rd**
2022	(Portugal) Algarve Pro Racing	(Austria) René Binder (United States) Steven Thomas	Oreca 07-Gibson	LMP2	363	19th	15th
2022	(Portugal) Algarve Pro Racing	(Austria) René Binder (United States) Steven Thomas	Oreca 07-Gibson	LMP2 Pro-Am	363	19th	**1st**
2023	(Portugal) Algarve Pro Racing	(United States) Colin Braun (United States) George Kurtz	Oreca 07-Gibson	LMP2	322	20th	10th
2023	(Portugal) Algarve Pro Racing	(United States) Colin Braun (United States) George Kurtz	Oreca 07-Gibson	LMP2 Pro-Am	322	20th	**1st**
2024	(France) Duqueine Team	(United States) John Falb (France) Jean-Baptiste Simmenauer	Oreca 07-Gibson	LMP2	112	DNF	DNF
2024	(France) Duqueine Team	(United States) John Falb (France) Jean-Baptiste Simmenauer	Oreca 07-Gibson	LMP2 Pro-Am	112	DNF	DNF
2026	(United States) AO by TF	(United States) Dane Cameron (United States) P. J. Hyett	Oreca 07-Gibson	LMP2	356	24th	10th
2026	(United States) AO by TF	(United States) Dane Cameron (United States) P. J. Hyett	Oreca 07-Gibson	LMP2 Pro-Am	356	24th	**3rd**

=== Complete IMSA SportsCar Championship results ===
(key) (Races in bold indicate pole position) (Races in italics indicate fastest lap)

Year	Team	Class	Make	Engine	1	2	3	4	5	6	7	8	Pos.	Points
2019	DragonSpeed	LMP2	Oreca 07	Gibson GK428 4.2 L V8	**DAY**; 3	SEB	MDO	WGL	MOS	ELK	LGA	PET	13th	30
2022	G-Drive Racing by APR	LMP2	Aurus 01	Gibson GK428 4.2 L V8	DAY; 9	SEB	LGA	MDO	WGL	ELK	PET		NC	0
2023	Proton Competition	LMP2	Oreca 07	Gibson GK428 4.2 L V8	DAY; 1	SEB	LGA	WGL	ELK	IMS	PET		NC	0
2024	DragonSpeed USA	LMP2	Oreca 07	Gibson GK428 4.2 L V8	DAY; 7	SEB	WGL	MOS	ELK	IMS	PET		48th	262

=== Complete Asian Le Mans Series results ===
(key) (Races in bold indicate pole position) (Races in italics indicate fastest lap)

Year	Team	Class	Car	Engine	1	2	3	4	5	6	Pos.	Points
2023	Algarve Pro Racing	LMP2	Oreca 07	Gibson GK428 4.2 L V8	DUB; 1; 1	DUB; 2; 4	ABU; 1; 9	ABU; 2; 4			3rd	51
2024–25	RD Limited	LMP2	Oreca 07	Gibson GK428 4.2 L V8	SEP; 1; 1	SEP; 2; 2	DUB; 1; 6	DUB; 2; 2	ABU; 1; 8	ABU; 2; 3	2nd	88
2025–26	RD Limited	LMP2	Oreca 07	Gibson GK428 4.2 L V8	SEP; 1; 6	SEP; 2; 8	DUB; 1; 3	DUB; 2; 5	ABU; 1; 3	ABU; 2; 12	5th	52

Sporting positions
Preceded by Louis Delétraz; Ferdinand Habsburg	European Le Mans Series; LMP2 Champion; 2023; With: Alex Lynn & Kyffin Simpson	Succeeded by Incumbent
