= 2017 24H Proto Series =

The 2017 24H Proto Series was the first season of the 24H Proto Series, presented by Creventic. The races were contested with LMP3 cars and Group CN cars.

== Calendar ==
Round	Event	Circuit	Date
NC1	3x3H Dubai	Dubai Autodrome, Dubai, United Arab Emirates	10–11 January
NC2	3x3H Dubai	Dubai Autodrome, Dubai, United Arab Emirates	10–11 January
NC3	3x3H Dubai	Dubai Autodrome, Dubai, United Arab Emirates	10–11 January
1	2x5H Spa-Francorchamps	Circuit de Spa-Francorchamps, Spa, Belgium	6–8 October
2	2x5H Spa-Francorchamps	Circuit de Spa-Francorchamps, Spa, Belgium	6–8 October
NC4	3x3H COTA USA	Circuit of the Americas, Austin, United States	9–10 November
NC5	3x3H COTA USA	Circuit of the Americas, Austin, United States	9–10 November
NC6	3x3H COTA USA	Circuit of the Americas, Austin, United States	9–10 November

Notes

- Events denoted by "NC" are non-championship races.
- Scheduled Paul Ricard events have been cancelled due to a lack of entries.
- Events 1 and 2 are run in conjunction with the 24H Series.

== Entry list ==
Team	Car	No.	Drivers	Rounds
P2
(United Kingdom) Simpson Motorsport	Ginetta G57 P2	2	(South Africa) Simon Murray	All
(United Kingdom) Simpson Motorsport	Ginetta G57 P2	2	(United Kingdom) Mike Simpson	All
(United Kingdom) Simpson Motorsport	Ginetta G57 P2	2	(United Kingdom) Steve Tandy	All
(United Kingdom) Simpson Motorsport	Ginetta G57 P2	3	(Netherlands) Rik Breukers	All
(United Kingdom) Simpson Motorsport	Ginetta G57 P2	3	(Greece) Andreas Laskaratos	All
(United Kingdom) Simpson Motorsport	Ginetta G57 P2	3	(United Kingdom) Ben Tuck	All
(United Kingdom) Simpson Motorsport	Ginetta G57 P2	50	(France) Philippe Haezebrouck	NC1–3
(United Kingdom) Simpson Motorsport	Ginetta G57 P2	50	(Canada) Bassam Kronfli	NC1–3
(United Kingdom) Simpson Motorsport	Ginetta G57 P2	52	(Australia) John Corbett	NC1–3
(United Kingdom) Simpson Motorsport	Ginetta G57 P2	52	(United Kingdom) James Winslow	NC1–3
(Belgium) Prime Racing	Ginetta G57 P2	4	(France) Christophe Capelli	All
(Belgium) Prime Racing	Ginetta G57 P2	4	(Belgium) Jean-Pierre Lequeux	All
(Belgium) Prime Racing	Ginetta G57 P2	4	(Luxembourg) Jean-Marc Ueberecken	All
(United Kingdom) Team LNT	Ginetta G57 P2	5	(United Kingdom) Charlie Robertson	All
(United Kingdom) Team LNT	Ginetta G57 P2	5	(United Kingdom) Jordan Sanders	All
(United Kingdom) Century Motorsport	Ginetta G57 P2	51	(United Kingdom) Daniel McKay	NC1–3
(United Kingdom) Century Motorsport	Ginetta G57 P2	51	(United Kingdom) Euan McKay	NC1–3
(United Kingdom) HHC Racing	Ginetta G57 P2	53	(Kuwait) Khaled Al Mudhaf	NC1–3
(United Kingdom) HHC Racing	Ginetta G57 P2	53	(United Kingdom) Charlie Robertson	NC1–3
(United Kingdom) Optimum Motorsport	Ginetta G57 P2	54	(United Kingdom) Adrian Barwick	NC1–3
(United Kingdom) Optimum Motorsport	Ginetta G57 P2	54	(United Kingdom) Bradley Ellis	NC1–3
(United Kingdom) Optimum Motorsport	Ginetta G57 P2	54	(United States) James French	NC1–3
(United Kingdom) Optimum Motorsport	Ginetta G57 P2	54	(United States) Kyle Masson	NC1–3
(United Kingdom) CWS	Ginetta G57 P2	55	(United States) Jason Coupal	NC1–3
(United Kingdom) CWS	Ginetta G57 P2	55	(United States) Brandon Gdovic	NC1–3
(United Kingdom) CWS	Ginetta G57 P2	55	(United Kingdom) Colin White	NC1–3
(United Arab Emirates) Atech - DXB	Ginetta G57 P2	56	(Netherlands) Rik Breukers	NC1–3
(United Arab Emirates) Atech - DXB	Ginetta G57 P2	56	(United Kingdom) Julian Griffin	NC1–3
(United Arab Emirates) Atech - DXB	Ginetta G57 P2	56	(Australia) Oliver Smith	NC1–2
(United Arab Emirates) Atech - DXB	Ginetta G57 P2	56	(France) Philippe Haezebrouck	NC3
(United Arab Emirates) Atech - DXB	Ginetta G57 P2	56	(Canada) Bassam Kronfli	NC3
(United Arab Emirates) Atech - DXB	Ginetta G57 P2	56	(United Kingdom) Charlie Robertson	NC3
(France) Graff	Ginetta G57 P2	57	(United Kingdom) Lawrence Tomlinson	NC1-2
(France) Graff	Ginetta G57 P2	57	(United Kingdom) Jordan Sanders	NC1–3
(France) Graff	Ginetta G57 P2	57	(United Kingdom) Mike Simpson	NC1–3
(France) Graff	Ginetta G57 P2	57	(Kuwait) Khaled Al Mudhaf	NC3
P3
(Italy) monza garage	Ligier JS P3	8	(Australia) John Corbett	All
(Italy) monza garage	Ligier JS P3	8	(Australia) Neale Muston	All
(Italy) monza garage	Ligier JS P3	8	(United Kingdom) James Winslow	All
(France) Graff	Ligier JS P3	12	(Germany) Edward Lewis Brauner	NC1–3
(France) Graff	Ligier JS P3	12	(France) Franck Matelli	NC1–3
(France) Graff	Ligier JS P3	12	(France) Eric Trouillet	NC1–3
(Netherlands) Kox Racing	Ligier JS P3	48	(Netherlands) Peter Kox	NC1–3
(Netherlands) Kox Racing	Ligier JS P3	48	(Netherlands) Nico Pronk	NC1–3
CN
(France) IDEC SPORT RACING	Ligier JS 53 Evo2	17	(France) David Abramczik	NC1–3
(France) IDEC SPORT RACING	Ligier JS 53 Evo2	17	(France) Frédérique Da Rocha	NC1–3
(France) IDEC SPORT RACING	Ligier JS 53 Evo2	17	(France) Nicolas Da Rocha	NC1–3
(France) IDEC SPORT RACING	Ligier JS 53 Evo2	17	(France) Romain Vozniak	NC1–3
(Italy) Avelon Formula	Wolf GB08	45	(Italy) Ivan Bellarosa	NC1–3
(Italy) Avelon Formula	Wolf GB08	45	(Italy) Guglielmo Belotti	NC1–3
(Italy) Avelon Formula	Wolf GB08	46	(United Kingdom) Nick Adcock	NC1–3
(Italy) Avelon Formula	Wolf GB08	46	(Qatar) Amro Al-Hamad	NC1–3
(Italy) Avelon Formula	Wolf GB08	46	(Italy) Guglielmo Belotti	NC1–3
(San Marino) GDL Racing Team Asia	Radical SR3 RSX	80	(Hong Kong) Nigel Farmer	NC1–3
(San Marino) GDL Racing Team Asia	Radical SR3 RSX	80	(Singapore) Bruce Lee	NC1–3
(San Marino) GDL Racing Team Asia	Radical SR3 RSX	80	(Singapore) Liam Lim Keong	NC1–3
(United Arab Emirates) AUH Motorsports	Radical SR3 RSX	81	(Australia) Tarek Elgammal	NC1–3
(United Arab Emirates) AUH Motorsports	Radical SR3 RSX	81	(Russia) Konstantin Gugkaev	NC1–3
(France) Krafft Racing	Norma M20 FC	82	(France) Max Bortolami	NC1–3
(France) Krafft Racing	Norma M20 FC	82	(France) David Cristini	NC1–3
(France) Krafft Racing	Norma M20 FC	82	(France) Régis Tref	NC1–3
(France) Krafft Racing	Norma M20 FC	85	(France) Daniel Kirmann	NC1–3
(France) Krafft Racing	Norma M20 FC	85	(France) François Kirmann	NC1–3
(France) Krafft Racing	Norma M20 FC	85	(Canada) Jean-Charles Perrin	NC1–3

== Results and standings ==
=== Race results ===
Bold indicates overall winner.

Round	Circuit	P2 Winners	P3 Winners	CN Winners
NC1	(United Arab Emirates) Dubai	(United Kingdom) No. 51 Century Motorsport	(France) **No. 12 Graff**	(France) No. 17 IDEC SPORT RACING
NC1	(United Arab Emirates) Dubai	(United Kingdom) Daniel McKay (United Kingdom) Euan McKay	(Germany) **Edward Lewis Brauner** **(France) Franck Matelli** **(France) Eric Trouillet**	(France) David Abramczik (France) Frédérique Da Rocha (France) Nicolas Da Rocha (France) Romain Vozniak
NC2	(United Arab Emirates) Dubai	(United Kingdom) **No. 54 Optimum Motorsport**	(Netherlands) No. 48 Kox Racing	(France) No. 85 Krafft Racing
NC2	(United Arab Emirates) Dubai	(United Kingdom) **Adrian Barwick** **(United Kingdom) Bradley Ellis** **(United States) James French** **(United States) Kyle Masson**	(Netherlands) Peter Kox (Netherlands) Nico Pronk	(France) Daniel Kirmann (France) François Kirmann (Canada) Jean-Charles Perrin
NC3	(United Arab Emirates) Dubai	(United Kingdom) No. 51 Century Motorsport	(France) **No. 12 Graff**	(United Arab Emirates) No. 81 AUH Motorsports
NC3	(United Arab Emirates) Dubai	(United Kingdom) Daniel McKay (United Kingdom) Euan McKay	(Germany) **Edward Lewis Brauner** **(France) Franck Matelli** **(France) Eric Trouillet**	(Australia) Tarek Elgammal (Russia) Konstantin Gugkaev
1	(Belgium) Spa-Francorchamps	(United Kingdom) **No. 3 Simpson Motorsport**	(Italy) No. 8 monza garage	No entries
1	(Belgium) Spa-Francorchamps	(Netherlands) **Rik Breukers** **(Greece) Andreas Laskaratos** **(United Kingdom) Ben Tuck**	(Australia) John Corbett (Australia) Neale Muston (United Kingdom) James Winslow	No entries
2	(Belgium) Spa-Francorchamps	(United Kingdom) **No. 3 Simpson Motorsport**	(Italy) No. 8 monza garage	No entries
2	(Belgium) Spa-Francorchamps	(Netherlands) **Rik Breukers** **(Greece) Andreas Laskaratos** **(United Kingdom) Ben Tuck**	(Australia) John Corbett (Australia) Neale Muston (United Kingdom) James Winslow	No entries
NC4	(United States) Austin			
NC5	(United States) Austin			
NC6	(United States) Austin			

== See also ==
- 24H Series
- 2017 24H Series
- 2017 Touring Car Endurance Series
