= Alexandre Cougnaud =

French racing driver

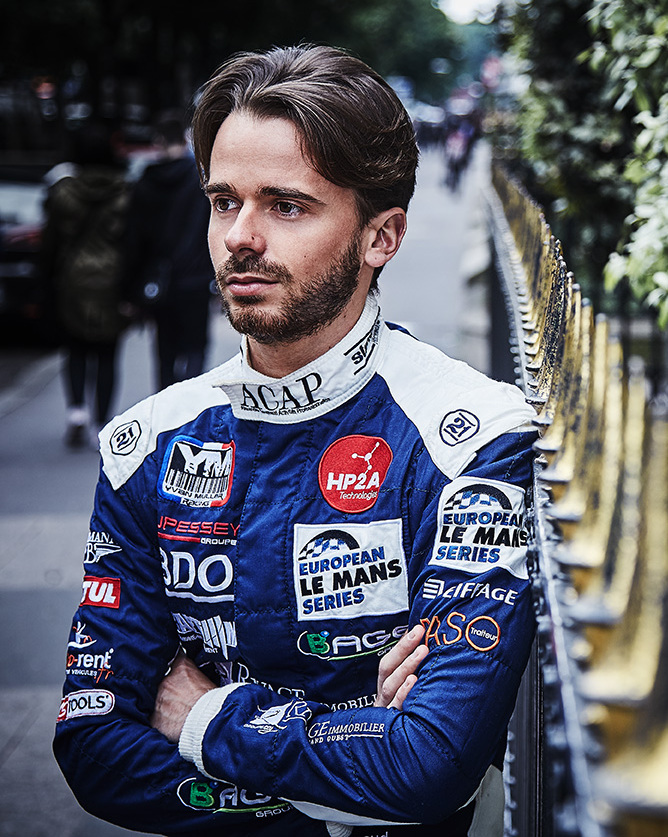
- Cougnaud in 2017
- Nationality: French
- Born: Alexandre Yannick Guy Jean-Claude Cougnaud; 5 December 1991 (age 34) Les Sables-d'Olonne, France

European F3 Open Championship career
- Debut season: 2012
- Current team: RP Motorsport
- Categorisation: FIA Silver
- Car number: 18
- Former teams: Top F3
- Starts: 106
- Wins: 3
- Podiums: 18
- Poles: 3
- Fastest laps: 3
- Best finish: 1st in 2013

Previous series
- 2011 2010 2009: Formula Renault 2.0 Alps; Formula Renault 2.0 MEC; Formul'Academy Euro Series

Alexandre Yannick Guy Jean-Claude Cougnaud (born 5 December 1991) is a French racing driver who competes in the European Le Mans Series with Graff Racing.

== Career ==
=== Early career ===
Cougnaud, born in Les Sables-d'Olonne, France, began karting in 2002 and raced primarily in his native France country. Having finished sixth in the Formula Kart France series in 2008, he entered the Formul'Academy Euro Series the following year, driving for Signatech; he finished 14th in the championship, with eight points.

In 2010, Cougnaud entered four rounds of the Formula Renault 2.0 Suisse for ARTA Engineering; he took a single podium, and finished ninth in the championship, with 57 points.

In 2011, Cougnaud entered a single round of the Championnat VdeV with AB Sport Auto, in addition to fourteen rounds of the Formula Renault 2.0 Alps with ARTA Engineering, and three races of the Formula Ford EuroCup with Cliff Dempsey Racing; he was classified tenth in the Championnat VdeV, and 17th in the Formula Renault Alps.

=== European F3 Open ===
In 2012, Cougnaud decided to race in "Copa/Cup Class" of the European F3 Open Championship for the Dallara F308 cars with Top F3 French team. He had a successful season, finishing third in the overall classification of the Cup class with eight podiums.

In 2013, Cougnaud joined the Italian team RP Motorsport to drive a Dallara F312 car. He and Santiago Urrutia were originally the two drivers chosen to drive a F312 car for Fabio Pampado's team; and they have been joined by Alexander Toril and Sandy Stuvik to compete in the European F3 Open with a Dallara Formula 3 F312 as well.

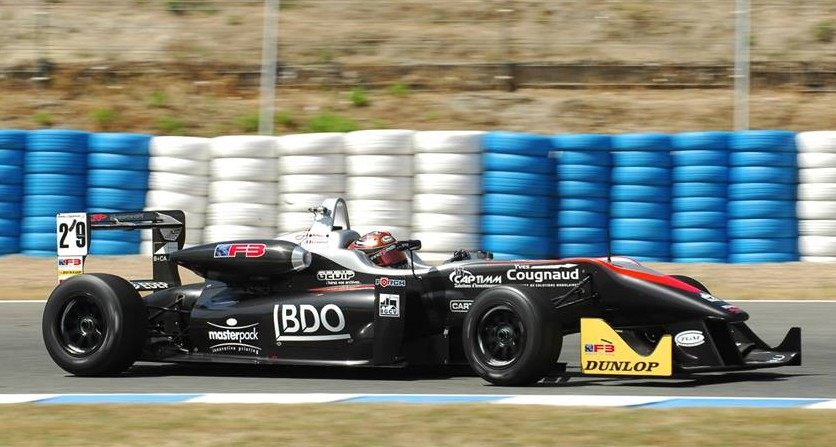
Cougnaud at Jerez driving for RP Motorsport, his first F3 podium of 2013.

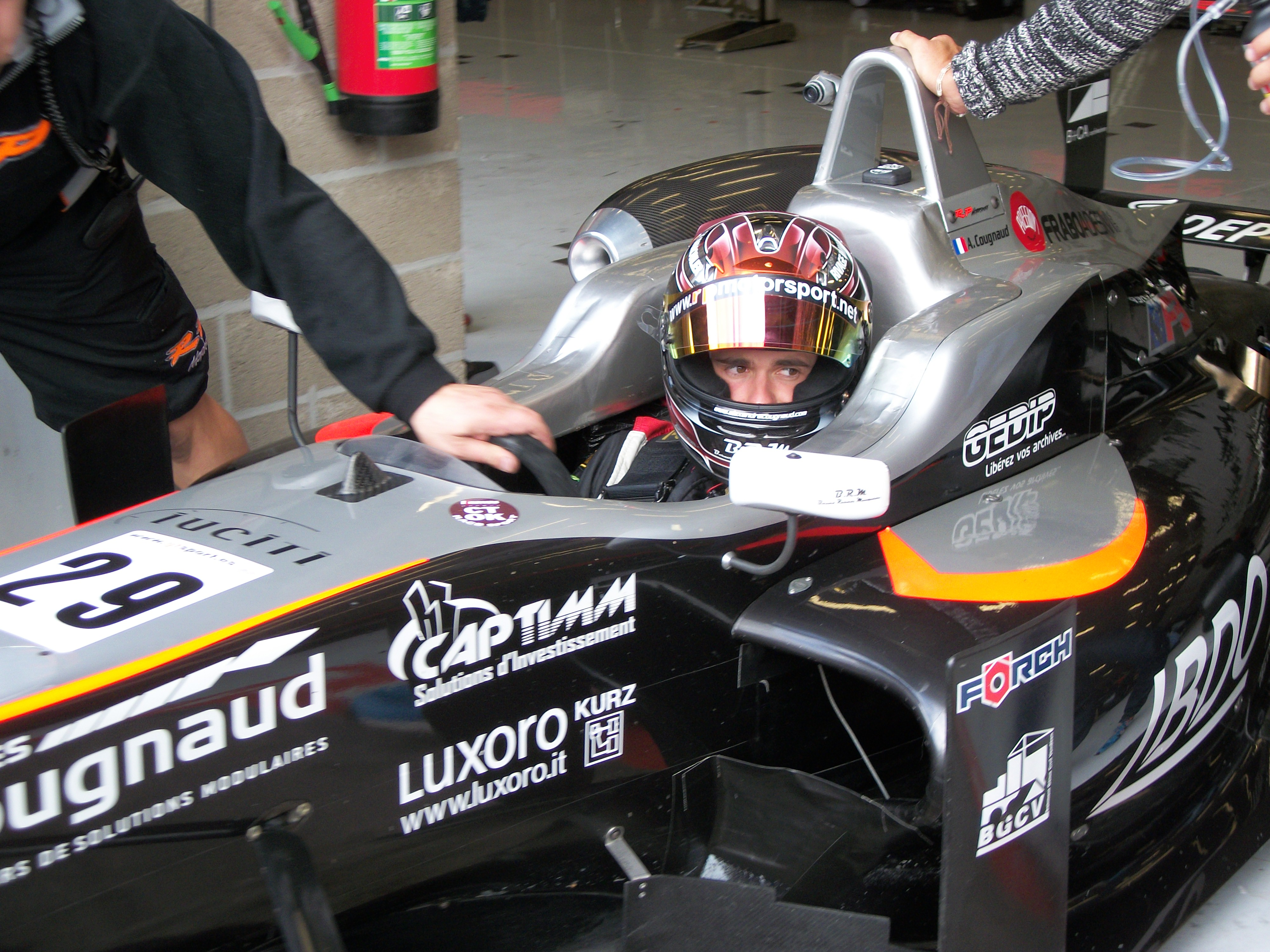
Cougnaud at Spa getting out of the box for Q2 session (F3).

Cougnaud had some difficulties with the set-up of his car at the beginning of the season, especially in bad weather conditions and he also incurred several penalties, like at Silverstone, where he finished fifth in the second race but got a 30-second penalty after the race, so fifth place was for Stern.

Cougnaud had a good result at Jerez where he finished fourth in the first race, and third in the second one.

At Monza, in October, Cougnaud did his best performance of the season in the second race : pole position, a second-place finish and fastest lap. He could not resist to his teammate Sandy Stuvik in the last lap.

Cougnaud had a great finish of the season at Barcelona finishing in third position for the first race and winning the second one (his first victory in Formula 3).

=== Porsche Carrera Cup France ===
In both 2014 and 2015, Cougnaud raced in the Porsche Carrera Cup France championship. He finished in tenth position the first year and in 12th position the second year.

=== European Le Mans Series ===
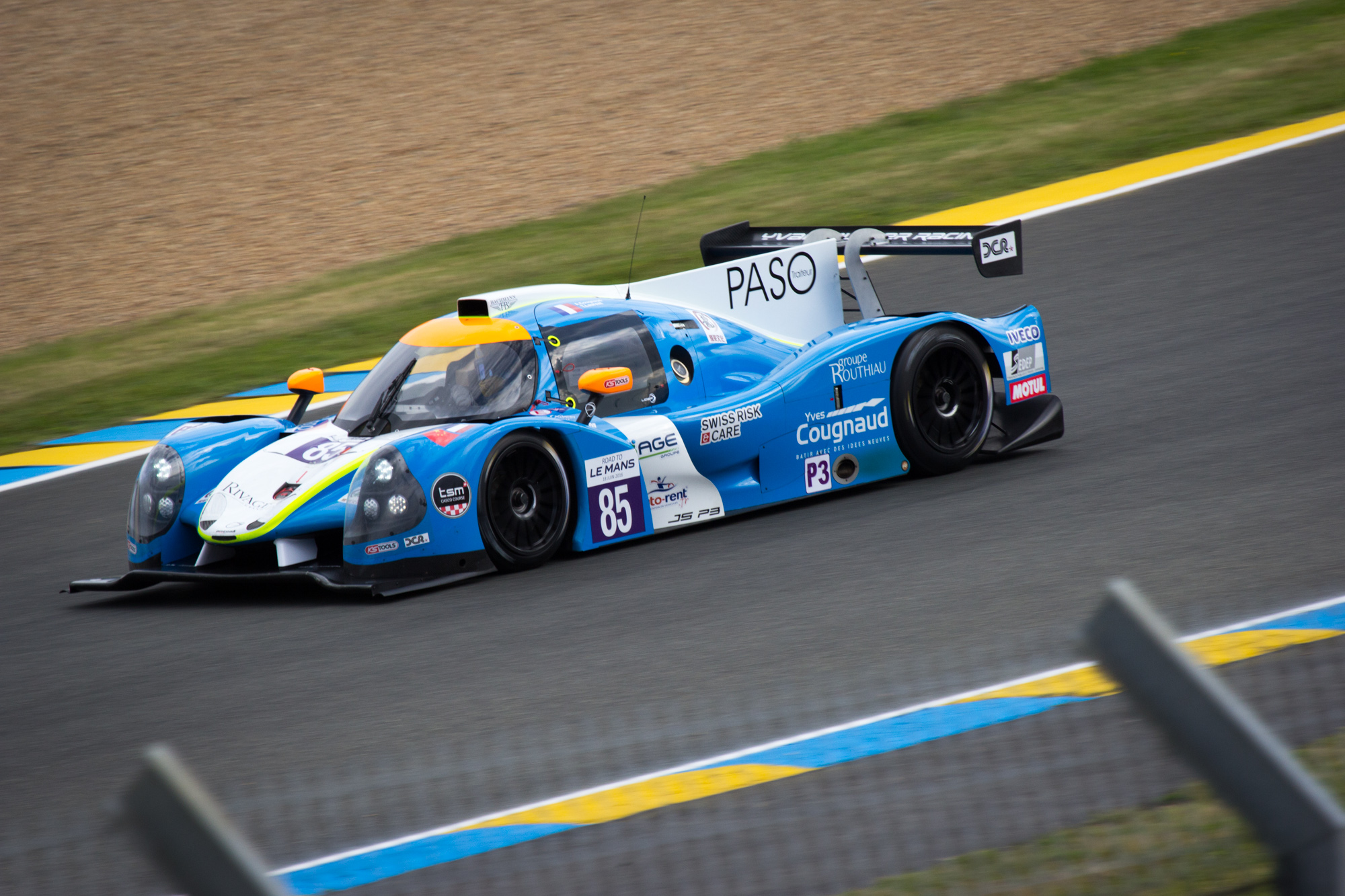
Cougnaud en route to winning the 2016 Road to Le Mans in LMP3.

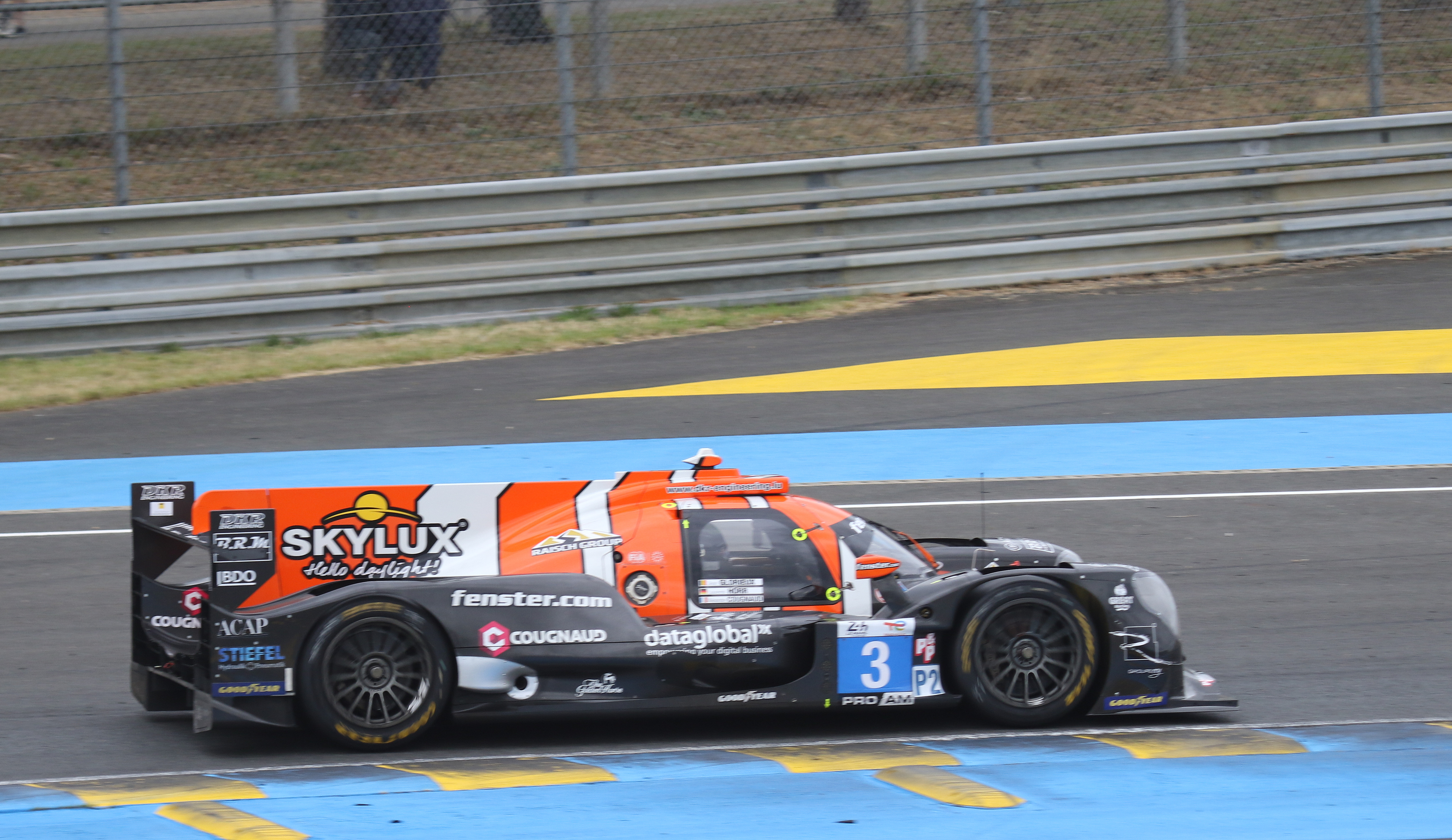
Cougnaud aboard DKR Engineering's LMP2 at the 2022 24 Hours of Le Mans.

In 2016, Cougnaud joined the famous European Le Mans Series (ELMS), a European sports car racing endurance series inspired by the 24 Hours of Le Mans race and run by the Automobile Club de l'Ouest (ACO). For his first year in ELMS, he won two races for the Yvan Muller Racing team. The first one being the prestigious Road To Le Mans race and the second one, the last leg of the 2016 championship in Estoril.

In 2017, Cougnaud extended his contract with the Yvan Muller racing team for one year. After two legs, he was in second position of the LMP3 classification with one podium (second position) in Monza.

In 2018, Cougnaud moved to the LMP2 class with Graff Racing in the European Le Mans Series. He continued with Graff in 2019, finishing third in the LMP2 championship with four podiums. In 2020, he took two podiums with the same team. In 2022, he made his debut at the 24 Hours of Le Mans with DKR Engineering, finishing 18th overall. In 2025, Cougnaud returned to Graff Racing to compete in the European Endurance Prototype Cup, driving a Nova NP02 alongside Loris Kyburz and Chun Ting Chou.

== Racing record ==
=== Career summary ===
Season	Series	Team	Races	Wins	Poles	F/Laps	Podiums	Points	Position
2009	Formul'Academy Euro Series	Auto Sport Academy	14	0	0	0	0	8	14th
2010	Formula Renault 2.0 Middle European Championship	ARTA Engineering	4	0	0	0	1	38	9th
2011	Formula Renault 2.0 Alps Series	ARTA Engineering	14	0	0	0	0	79	17th
2011	Formula Ford EuroCup	Cliff Dempsey Racing	3	0	0	0	0	N/A	
2011	British Formula Ford Championship	Cliff Dempsey Racing	3	0	0	0	0	0	NC†
2011	V de V Challenge Endurance Moderne - Proto	AB Sport Auto	1	0	0	0	0	8	10th
2012	European F3 Open	Top F3	16	0	0	0	0	14	15th
2012	European F3 Open - Copa F308/300	Top F3	16	0	1	2	8	70	**3rd**
2012	European F3 Open Winter Series	Top F3	2	0	0	0	0	0	NC
2013	European F3 Open Winter Series	RP Motorsport	1	0	0	0	0	0	NC
2013	European F3 Open	RP Motorsport	16	1	1	1	4	139	6th
2014	Porsche Carrera Cup France	Racing Technology	13	0	0	0	1	59	12th
2015	Porsche Carrera Cup France	Martinet Team Pro GT	12	0	0	0	1	83	10th
2016	European Le Mans Series - LMP3	M.Racing - YMR	6	1	0	0	1	36	8th
2016	Road To Le Mans - LMP3	DC Racing	1	1	0	0	1	N/A	**1st**
2017	European Le Mans Series - LMP3	M.Racing - YMR	6	0	0	0	4	81	**2nd**
2017	Le Mans Cup - LMP3	M.Racing - YMR	2	0	0	0	1	12	19th
2018	European Le Mans Series - LMP2	Graff	6	0	0	0	0	23	14th
2019	European Le Mans Series - LMP2	Graff	6	0	0	0	4	83	**3rd**
2019	24H GT Series - A6	GPX Racing							
2020	European Le Mans Series - LMP2	Graff	5	0	0	0	2	43	6th
2021	GT World Challenge Europe Endurance Cup	Saintéloc Racing	5	0	0	0	0	0	NC
2022	French GT4 Cup - Silver	CSA Racing	10	0	0	0	1	67	7th
2022	24 Hours of Le Mans - LMP2	DKR Engineering	1	0	0	0	0	N/A	18th
2023	GT4 European Series - Silver	CSA Racing	8	0	0	0	0	30	22nd
2023	GT World Challenge Europe Endurance Cup	CSA Racing	1	0	0	0	0	0	NC
2023	24 Hours of Le Mans - LMP2	Graff Racing	Reserve driver						
2024	Le Mans Cup - LMP3	M Racing	7	0	0	0	1	23.5	10th
2025	European Endurance Prototype Cup	Graff Racing							

=== Complete Formula Renault 2.0 Alps Series results ===
(key) (Races in bold indicate pole position; races in italics indicate fastest lap)

Year	Team	1	2	3	4	5	6	7	8	9	10	11	12	13	14	Pos	Points
2011	ARTA Engineering	MNZ; 1; 16	MNZ; 2; 10	IMO; 1; 15	IMO; 2 Ret	PAU; 1; 10	PAU; 2; 8	RBR; 1; 16	RBR; 2; 12	HUN; 1; 11	HUN; 2; 19	LEC; 1; 12	LEC; 2; 13	SPA; 1; 10	SPA; 2; 11	17th	79

=== Complete FIA World Endurance Championship results ===
(key) (Races in bold indicate pole position; races in italics indicate fastest lap)

Year	Entrant	Class	Chassis	Engine	1	2	3	4	5	6	Rank	Points
2022	DKR Engineering	LMP2	Oreca 07	Gibson GK428 4.2 L V8	SEB	SPA	LMS; 18	MNZ	FUJ	BHR	-*	_*

=== Complete 24 Hours of Le Mans results ===
Year	Team	Co-drivers	Car	Class	Laps	Pos.	Class Pos.
2022	(Luxembourg) DKR Engineering	(Belgium) Jean Glorieux (Germany) Laurents Hörr	Oreca 07-Gibson	LMP2	362	22nd	18th
