= 2010 F4 Eurocup 1.6 =

French motorsport season

Seasons
- ← 2009 2011 →

The 2010 F4 Eurocup 1.6 was the eighteenth season of the series for 1600cc Formula Renault machinery, and the only season run under the guise of F4 Eurocup 1.6. The series began on 17 April at Motorland Aragon and ended on 10 October at Circuit de Catalunya, after seven rounds and fourteen races.

Stoffel Vandoorne clinched the championship with a meeting to spare, winning six races en route to a 36-point championship winning margin over Norman Nato, with Mathieu Jaminet edging out Paul-Loup Chatin for third place overall. Franck Matelli finished fifth; the only other driver to win a race over the season.

It was the final season run under the "F4 Eurocup 1.6" name, as the series was renamed the "French F4 Championship" for 2011.

== Driver lineup ==
No	Driver	Rounds
1	(France) Nicolas de Moura	All
2	(Belgium) Stoffel Vandoorne	All
3	(France) Paul-Loup Chatin	All
4	(France) Mathieu Jaminet	All
5	(Morocco) Hamza El Fatouaki	1–2, 4
6	(France) Alexandre Anezo	All
7	(France) Marie Baus-Coppens	All
8	(Italy) Giada de Zen	All
9	(France) Alexandre Mantovani	All
10	(France) Sébastien Le Bras	1–4, 6–7
11	(France) Pierre Sancinéna	All
12	(France) Maxime Bourcet	All
14	(France) Alexandre Jouannem-Sivan	All
15	(France) Maxime Raphoz	All
16	(France) Valentin Simonet	All
17	(France) Norman Nato	All
18	(France) Paul Lanchère	All
19	(France) Tristan Papavoine	All
20	(France) Jean-Baptiste Lahaye	All
21	(France) Franck Matelli	All
22	(France) Cécilia Asquini	3
22	(France) Pierre Nicolet	4–7

== Race calendar and results ==
- Under its new name, the F4 Eurocup 1.6 series was part of the World Series by Renault and shared seven race weekends with the main three World Series events.

Round		Circuit	Date	Pole position	Fastest lap	Winning driver
1	R1	(Spain) Ciudad del Motor de Aragón, Alcañiz	17 April	(France) Franck Matelli	(Belgium) Stoffel Vandoorne	(France) Norman Nato
1	R2	(Spain) Ciudad del Motor de Aragón, Alcañiz	18 April	(Belgium) Stoffel Vandoorne	(France) Alexandre Mantovani	(Belgium) Stoffel Vandoorne
2	R1	(Belgium) Circuit de Spa-Francorchamps	1 May	(Belgium) Stoffel Vandoorne	(Belgium) Stoffel Vandoorne	(Belgium) Stoffel Vandoorne
2	R2	(Belgium) Circuit de Spa-Francorchamps	2 May	(Belgium) Stoffel Vandoorne	(France) Franck Matelli	(Belgium) Stoffel Vandoorne
3	R1	(France) Circuit de Nevers Magny-Cours	19 June	(France) Franck Matelli	(France) Franck Matelli	(France) Franck Matelli
3	R2	(France) Circuit de Nevers Magny-Cours	20 June	(France) Alexandre Mantovani	(France) Norman Nato	(Belgium) Stoffel Vandoorne
4	R1	(Hungary) Hungaroring, Mogyoród	3 July	(France) Mathieu Jaminet	(France) Mathieu Jaminet	(France) Mathieu Jaminet
4	R2	(Hungary) Hungaroring, Mogyoród	4 July	(France) Mathieu Jaminet	(France) Mathieu Jaminet	(France) Mathieu Jaminet
5	R1	(Germany) Hockenheimring	4 September	(Belgium) Stoffel Vandoorne	(Belgium) Stoffel Vandoorne	(Belgium) Stoffel Vandoorne
5	R2	(Germany) Hockenheimring	5 September	(Belgium) Stoffel Vandoorne	(Belgium) Stoffel Vandoorne	(Belgium) Stoffel Vandoorne
6	R1	(United Kingdom) Silverstone Circuit	18 September	(France) Paul-Loup Chatin	(France) Paul-Loup Chatin	(France) Paul-Loup Chatin
6	R2	(United Kingdom) Silverstone Circuit	19 September	(France) Paul-Loup Chatin	(France) Paul-Loup Chatin	(France) Paul-Loup Chatin
7	R1	(Spain) Circuit de Catalunya, Barcelona	9 October	(France) Mathieu Jaminet	(France) Paul-Loup Chatin	(France) Mathieu Jaminet
7	R2	(Spain) Circuit de Catalunya, Barcelona	10 October	(France) Norman Nato	(France) Norman Nato	(France) Norman Nato

== Championship standings ==
- Points were awarded to the top ten drivers in both races on a 15-12-10-8-6-5-4-3-2-1 basis. Additional points were awarded to the driver achieving pole position and fastest lap in each race. Only a driver's best twelve results counted towards the championship.

Pos	Driver	ALC (Spain)		SPA (Belgium)		MAG (France)		HUN (Hungary)		HOC (Germany)		SIL (United Kingdom)		CAT (Spain)		Total
1	(Belgium) Stoffel Vandoorne	2	**1**	**1**	**1**	2	1	16	4	**1**	**1**	4	2	4	4	159
2	(France) Norman Nato	1	3	7	7	6	5	2	2	2	4	3	6	3	**1**	123
3	(France) Mathieu Jaminet	6	6	Ret	8	3	3	**1**	**1**	6	8	7	4	**1**	2	112
4	(France) Paul-Loup Chatin	4	8	10	10	11	4	4	7	4	2	**1**	**1**	2	7	103
5	(France) Franck Matelli	**5**	Ret	6	2	**1**	2	7	5	3	3	9	17	7	5	96
6	(France) Paul Lanchère	3	2	2	3	12	Ret	3	3	8	5	5	5	10	8	89
7	(France) Alexandre Mantovani	Ret	7	8	6	4	**6**	5	10	5	15	2	3	5	3	78
8	(France) Pierre Sancinéna	7	5	5	9	8	7	6	6	7	7	15	7	Ret	6	52
9	(France) Jean-Baptiste Lahaye	8	4	3	4	5	Ret	Ret	Ret	9	12	8	8	6	9	50
10	(France) Tristan Papavoine	10	10	9	19	7	8	15	11	13	14	6	Ret	8	Ret	19
11	(France) Sébastien Le Bras	9	11	4	12	9	10	9	14			11	Ret	13	17	15
12	(France) Nicolas de Moura	12	9	11	11	10	9	12	12	10	6	12	Ret	Ret	13	11
13	(France) Valentin Simonet	14	19	Ret	15	14	14	8	8	12	Ret	14	10	9	11	9
14	(France) Alexandre Jouannem-Sivan	Ret	13	12	5	18	11	18	Ret	14	13	13	9	11	12	8
15	(France) Maxime Raphoz	11	12	13	13	13	12	11	9	11	10	10	13	Ret	10	5
16	(France) Alexandre Anezo	15	14	Ret	14	Ret	15	10	18†	Ret	9	17	11	15	Ret	3
17	(Italy) Giada de Zen	13	16	14	16	17	Ret	Ret	15	15	11	16	12	12	14	0
18	(France) Maxime Bourcet	16	15	15	17	15	13	14	13	16	16	18	15	14	16	0
19	(France) Pierre Nicolet							13	16	17	Ret	20	14	17†	15	0
20	(France) Marie Baus-Coppens	Ret	17	16	18	Ret	Ret	17	17†	18	17	19	16	16	18	0
21	(France) Cécilia Asquini					16	16									0
22	(Morocco) Hamza El Fatouaki	Ret	18	17	20			Ret	19							0
Pos	Driver	ALC (Spain)		SPA (Belgium)		MAG (France)		HUN (Hungary)		HOC (Germany)		SIL (United Kingdom)		CAT (Spain)		Total

Colour	Result
Gold	Winner
Silver	Second place
Bronze	Third place
Green	Points classification
Blue	Non-points classification
Blue	Non-classified finish (NC)
Purple	Retired, not classified (Ret)
Red	Did not qualify (DNQ)
Red	Did not pre-qualify (DNPQ)
Black	Disqualified (DSQ)
White	Did not start (DNS)
White	Withdrew (WD)
White	Race cancelled (C)
Blank	Did not practice (DNP)
Blank	Did not arrive (DNA)
Blank	Excluded (EX)

**Bold** - Pole
Italics - Fastest Lap
