= 2009 Formul'Academy Euro Series =

Motor racing competition

2009 Formul'Academy Euro Series season

Seasons
- ← 2008 2010 →

The 2009 Formul'Academy Euro Series season was the seventeenth season of the series for 1600cc Formula Renault machinery, and the second under the Formul'Academy Euro Series guise. The season began on 3 May at Circuit Ricardo Tormo in Valencia, Spain and ended on 25 October at Ciudad del Motor de Aragón in Alcañiz, also in Spain; and consisted of fourteen races at seven meetings. Benjamin Bailly became series champion, only the fourth time that a non-French driver had won the series that began as Formula Renault Campus.

== Driver lineup ==
| No | Driver | Rounds |
|---|---|---|
| 1 | (France) Donald Choque | All |
| 2 | (France) Christophe Charrier | 2 |
| 2 | (France) Alexandre Mantovani | 5 |
| 2 | (France) Adrien Iché | 7 |
| 3 | (France) Franck Matelli | All |
| 4 | (France) Clovis Roux | All |
| 5 | (France) Amir Mesny | All |
| 6 | (Belgium) Benjamin Bailly | All |
| 7 | (France) Vincent Beltoise | All |
| 8 | (Spain) Fernando Monje | All |
| 9 | (France) William Vermont | All |
| 10 | (Italy) Andrea Cecchellero | All |
| 11 | (France) Romain Fournillier | All |
| 12 | (France) Louis Gervoson | All |
| 13 | (France) Jonathan Fiorillo | All |
| 14 | (France) Thibaut Taquet | All |
| 15 | (France) Yann Zimmer | All |
| 16 | (France) Alexandre Cougnaud | All |
| 17 | (France) Julien Deschamps | All |
| 18 | (France) Paul Lanchère | All |
| 19 | (Czech Republic) Jakub Klášterka | All |

== Race calendar and results ==
- A seven-round calendar was announced on 12 January 2009.

| Round | | Circuit | Date | Pole position | Fastest lap | Winning driver | Supporting |
|---|---|---|---|---|---|---|---|
| 1 | R1 | (Spain) Circuit Ricardo Tormo, Valencia | 3 May | (France) Vincent Beltoise | (Belgium) Benjamin Bailly | (France) Vincent Beltoise | European F3 Open |
| 1 | R2 | (Spain) Circuit Ricardo Tormo, Valencia | 3 May | (Belgium) Benjamin Bailly | (Belgium) Benjamin Bailly | (Belgium) Benjamin Bailly | European F3 Open |
| 2 | R1 | (France) Circuit de Pau Ville | 16 May | (France) Vincent Beltoise | (France) Franck Matelli | (Italy) Andrea Cecchellero | FIA WTCC Race of France |
| 2 | R2 | (France) Circuit de Pau Ville | 17 May | (Italy) Andrea Cecchellero | (France) Franck Matelli | (France) Vincent Beltoise | FIA WTCC Race of France |
| 3 | R1 | (Germany) Motorsport Arena Oschersleben | 20 June | (Belgium) Benjamin Bailly | (Belgium) Benjamin Bailly | (Belgium) Benjamin Bailly | FIA GT Oschersleben 2 Hours |
| 3 | R2 | (Germany) Motorsport Arena Oschersleben | 21 June | (France) Yann Zimmer | (Italy) Andrea Cecchellero | (France) Yann Zimmer | FIA GT Oschersleben 2 Hours |
| 4 | R1 | (Belgium) Circuit de Spa-Francorchamps | 24 July | (France) Vincent Beltoise | (Spain) Fernando Monje | (France) William Vermont | FIA GT 24 Hours of Spa |
| 4 | R2 | (Belgium) Circuit de Spa-Francorchamps | 25 July | (France) Vincent Beltoise | (Belgium) Benjamin Bailly | (Belgium) Benjamin Bailly | FIA GT 24 Hours of Spa |
| 5 | R1 | (France) Circuit de Nevers Magny-Cours | 19 September | (France) William Vermont | (France) William Vermont | (France) William Vermont | European F3 Open |
| 5 | R2 | (France) Circuit de Nevers Magny-Cours | 20 September | (France) William Vermont | (France) Yann Zimmer | (France) William Vermont | European F3 Open |
| 6 | R1 | (Italy) Autodromo Nazionale Monza | 3 October | (Belgium) Benjamin Bailly | (Italy) Andrea Cecchellero | (Belgium) Benjamin Bailly | Superleague Formula / European F3 Open |
| 6 | R2 | (Italy) Autodromo Nazionale Monza | 4 October | (Belgium) Benjamin Bailly | (France) Franck Matelli | (Belgium) Benjamin Bailly | Superleague Formula / European F3 Open |
| 7 | R1 | (Spain) Ciudad del Motor de Aragón, Alcañiz | 24 October | (France) Julien Deschamps | (France) Yann Zimmer | (Belgium) Benjamin Bailly | World Series by Renault |
| 7 | R2 | (Spain) Ciudad del Motor de Aragón, Alcañiz | 25 October | (France) Yann Zimmer | (France) Julien Deschamps | (France) Franck Matelli | World Series by Renault |

== Championship standings ==
=== Drivers ===
- Only a driver's best twelve results counted towards the championship. Points were awarded to the drivers as follows:

| Position | 1 | 2 | 3 | 4 | 5 | 6 | 7 | 8 | 9 | 10 | PP | FL |
|---|---|---|---|---|---|---|---|---|---|---|---|---|
| Points | 15 | 12 | 10 | 8 | 6 | 5 | 4 | 3 | 2 | 1 | 1 | 1 |

| Pos | Driver | VAL 1 (Spain) | VAL 2 (Spain) | PAU 1 (France) | PAU 2 (France) | OSC 1 (Germany) | OSC 2 (Germany) | SPA 1 (Belgium) | SPA 2 (Belgium) | MAG 1 (France) | MAG 2 (France) | MNZ 1 (Italy) | MNZ 2 (Italy) | ALC 1 (Spain) | ALC 2 (Spain) | Total |
|---|---|---|---|---|---|---|---|---|---|---|---|---|---|---|---|---|
| 1 | (Belgium) Benjamin Bailly | 3 | **1** | 2 | 4 | **1** | 2 | Ret | 1 | 2 | 3 | **1** | **1** | 1 | 5 | 162 |
| 2 | (France) Yann Zimmer | 5 | 5 | 7 | 11 | 2 | **1** | 2 | 3 | 3 | 4 | Ret | 4 | 3 | **2** | 117 |
| 3 | (France) William Vermont | 2 | 4 | 5 | Ret | Ret | Ret | 1 | 2 | **1** | **1** | 4 | Ret | Ret | 6 | 99 |
| 4 | (France) Franck Matelli | 8 | 7 | 4 | 3 | 6 | Ret | 3 | 8 | 5 | 7 | 3 | 2 | 4 | 1 | 98 |
| 5 | (France) Vincent Beltoise | **1** | 3 | **Ret** | 1 | 4 | 5 | **11** | **4** | 4 | 2 | 15 | 6 | 13 | 8 | 94 |
| 6 | (France) Julien Deschamps | 6 | 2 | 3 | 5 | 7 | DSQ | 5 | 7 | Ret | 5 | 9 | 7 | **2** | 3 | 83 |
| 7 | (Italy) Andrea Cecchellero | 4 | 6 | 1 | **Ret** | 8 | 6 | 6 | 10 | Ret | 8 | 2 | Ret | 7 | Ret | 64 |
| 8 | (France) Thibaut Taquet | 9 | 12 | 8 | 6 | 5 | Ret | 9 | 6 | 9 | 16 | 6 | 3 | 5 | 4 | 54 |
| 9 | (France) Paul Lanchère | 10 | 11 | 6 | 2 | Ret | Ret | 10 | 9 | 8 | 6 | 5 | Ret | 16 | 9 | 37 |
| 10 | (Spain) Fernando Monje | 7 | 8 | Ret | 9 | Ret | 4 | 4 | 5 | 16 | 11 | Ret | 8 | Ret | 13 | 36 |
| 11 | (Czech Republic) Jakub Klášterka | 11 | 17 | 12 | 12 | 3 | 3 | 12 | 14 | 10 | 10 | 10 | 5 | DSQ | 7 | 33 |
| 12 | (France) Donald Choque | Ret | 9 | 9 | 10 | Ret | 8 | 7 | 11 | 6 | 12 | 7 | 11 | 6 | 12 | 27 |
| 13 | (France) Jonathan Fiorillo | Ret | 14 | 16 | 15 | 9 | Ret | 14 | 17 | 7 | 13 | 12 | 9 | 8 | 10 | 12 |
| 14 | (France) Alexandre Cougnaud | Ret | 10 | 10 | 7 | 12 | Ret | 15 | 15 | 17 | Ret | 11 | Ret | 9 | 14 | 8 |
| 15 | (France) Clovis Roux | 15 | 16 | 11 | 13 | 11 | 10 | 13 | 12 | 13 | 9 | 8 | 10 | 11 | 18 | 7 |
| 16 | (France) Louis Gervoson | 14 | 15 | 13 | Ret | 13 | 7 | Ret | 18 | 11 | Ret | 16 | Ret | 10 | 11 | 5 |
| 17 | (France) Romain Fournillier | 12 | 13 | Ret | 14 | 10 | 11 | 8 | 13 | 14 | 14 | 13 | 12 | 15 | 17 | 4 |
| 18 | (France) Amir Mesny | 13 | Ret | 14 | 16 | DNS | 9 | Ret | 16 | 12 | 17 | 14 | 13 | 14 | 16 | 2 |
guest drivers ineligible for points
| | (France) Christophe Charrier | | | 15 | 8 | | | | | | | | | | | 0 |
| | (France) Adrien Iché | | | | | | | | | | | | | 12 | 15 | 0 |
| | (France) Alexandre Mantovani | | | | | | | | | 15 | 15 | | | | | 0 |
| Pos | Driver | VAL 1 (Spain) | VAL 2 (Spain) | PAU 1 (France) | PAU 2 (France) | OSC 1 (Germany) | OSC 2 (Germany) | SPA 1 (Belgium) | SPA 2 (Belgium) | MAG 1 (France) | MAG 2 (France) | MNZ 1 (Italy) | MNZ 2 (Italy) | ALC 1 (Spain) | ALC 2 (Spain) | Total |

| Colour | Result |
|---|---|
| Gold | Winner |
| Silver | Second place |
| Bronze | Third place |
| Green | Points classification |
| Blue | Non-points classification |
| Blue | Non-classified finish (NC) |
| Purple | Retired, not classified (Ret) |
| Red | Did not qualify (DNQ) |
| Red | Did not pre-qualify (DNPQ) |
| Black | Disqualified (DSQ) |
| White | Did not start (DNS) |
| White | Withdrew (WD) |
| White | Race cancelled (C) |
| Blank | Did not practice (DNP) |
| Blank | Did not arrive (DNA) |
| Blank | Excluded (EX) |

**Bold** – Pole
Italics – Fastest Lap
