= Mathieu Jaminet =

French racing driver (born 1994)

- Jaminet in 2025
- Nationality: (France) French
- Born: 24 October 1994 (age 32) Hayange, France
- Categorisation: FIA Silver (until 2016); FIA Gold (2017–2022); FIA Platinum (2023–)

WeatherTech SportsCar Championship career
- Debut season: 2017
- Teams: Porsche GT Team, Wright Motorsports, Alegra Motorsports
- Car number: 912 (2018–2020)
- Starts: 5 (GT Le Mans)
- Wins: 0
- Podiums: 2
- Poles: 0
- Fastest laps: 0
- Best finish: 19th in 2019

Previous series
- 2017–2018 2017–2018 2016 2015–2016 2013 2012 2011 2010: ADAC GT Masters; Pirelli World Challenge; Porsche Supercup; Porsche Carrera Cup France; FFSA GT Championship; Peugeot RCZ Cup France; Eurocup Formula Renault 2.0; F4 Eurocup 1.6

Championship titles
- 2018 2016 2012: ADAC GT Masters; Porsche Carrera Cup France; Peugeot RCZ Cup France

Mathieu Jaminet (born 24 October 1994) is a French racing driver competing in the FIA World Endurance Championship for Genesis Magma Racing. Jaminet was previously a long-time factory driver for Porsche and was twice an IMSA SportsCar champion, in 2022 in GTD Pro and 2025 in GTP.

== Career ==
Jaminet originally began pursuing a career in formula racing, participating in the F4 Eurocup 1.6 championship in 2010 and the Eurocup Formula Renault 2.0 championship in 2011. Following this, he moved between several racing series over the next years before entering the Porsche Carrera Cup France championship in 2015. After finishing second in his debut season there, he was named a Porsche Junior Driver for the 2016 season. Jaminet won the Carrera Cup championship in 2016 and took third in the Porsche Supercup championship, prompting Porsche to promote him to a "Young Professional."

Jaminet's No. 911 Porsche 911 GT3 R at the 2020 Bathurst 12 Hour.

For 2017, Jaminet participated primarily in ADAC GT Masters, driving for KÜS TEAM75 Bernhard. He, along with teammate Michael Ammermüller, finished eight in the championship, including a win at the first race of the season. Jaminet also made appearances in other series, including a handful of starts in the Pirelli World Challenge, two starts in the GT Daytona class of the WeatherTech SportsCar Championship, a participation in the 24 Hours of Spa.

Jaminet continued in ADAC GT Masters in 2018 ADAC GT Masters, this time driving for Precote Herberth Motorsport. He and teammate Robert Renauer won the championship, resulting in Jaminet earning more international race outings and a place on the North American Porsche GT Team to drive endurance races in the WeatherTech SportsCar Championship, as well as a chance to drive the 2019 24 Hours of Le Mans.

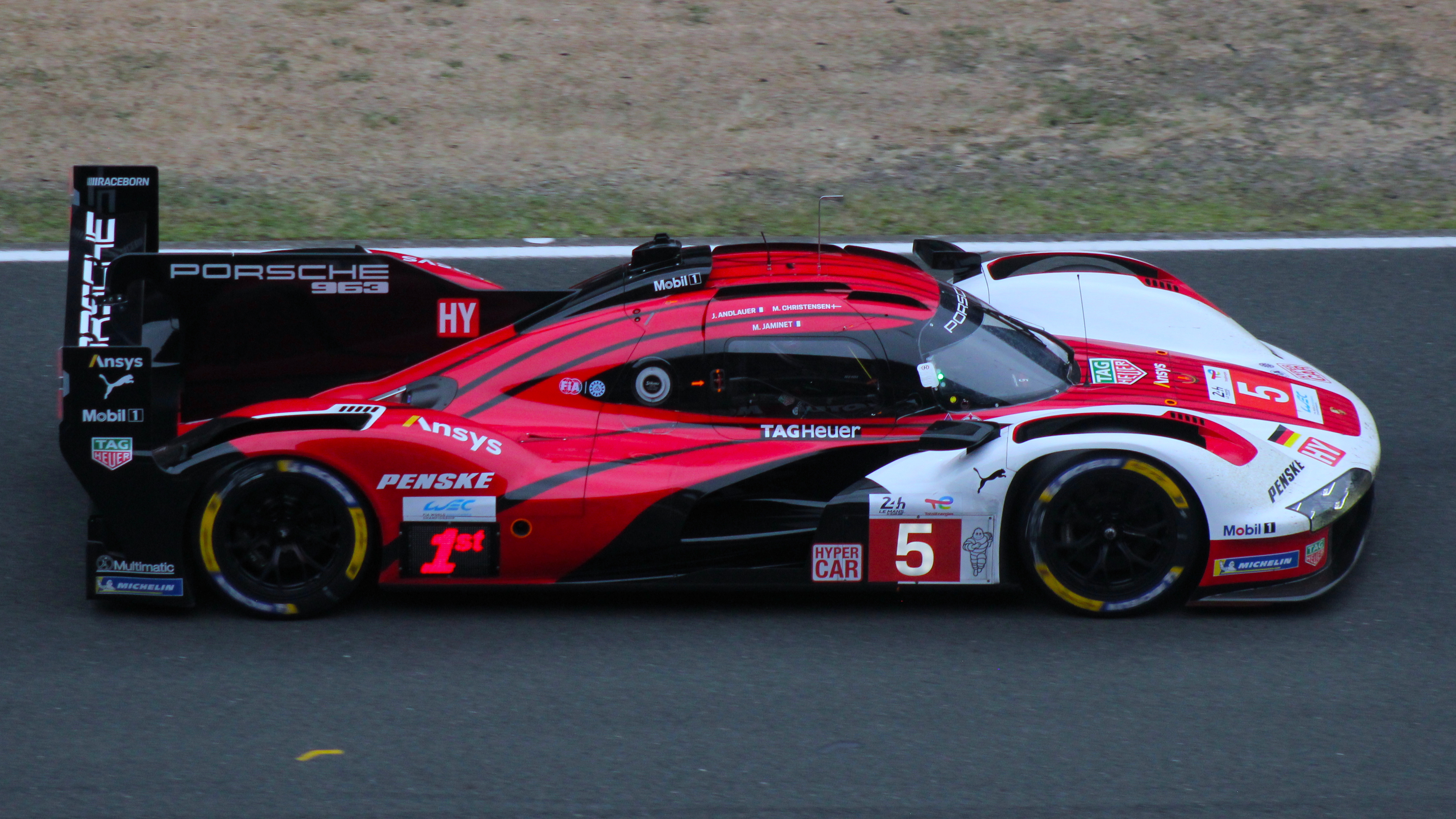
Jaminet's No. 5 Porsche 963 at the 2025 24 Hours of Le Mans.

For the 2020 season, Jaminet was promoted to a full Porsche factory driver. He continues to drive the North American endurance events with the Porsche GT Team, as well as participating in international GT3 events.

Beginning in 2023, Jaminet was selected as one of the drivers to pilot the Porsche 963 as part of Porsche's LMDh program. For 2023 and 2024, Jamient competed primarily in North America in the IMSA SportsCar Championship. For 2025, he was also selected to be part of Porshe's Hypercar team for the FIA World Endurance Championship.

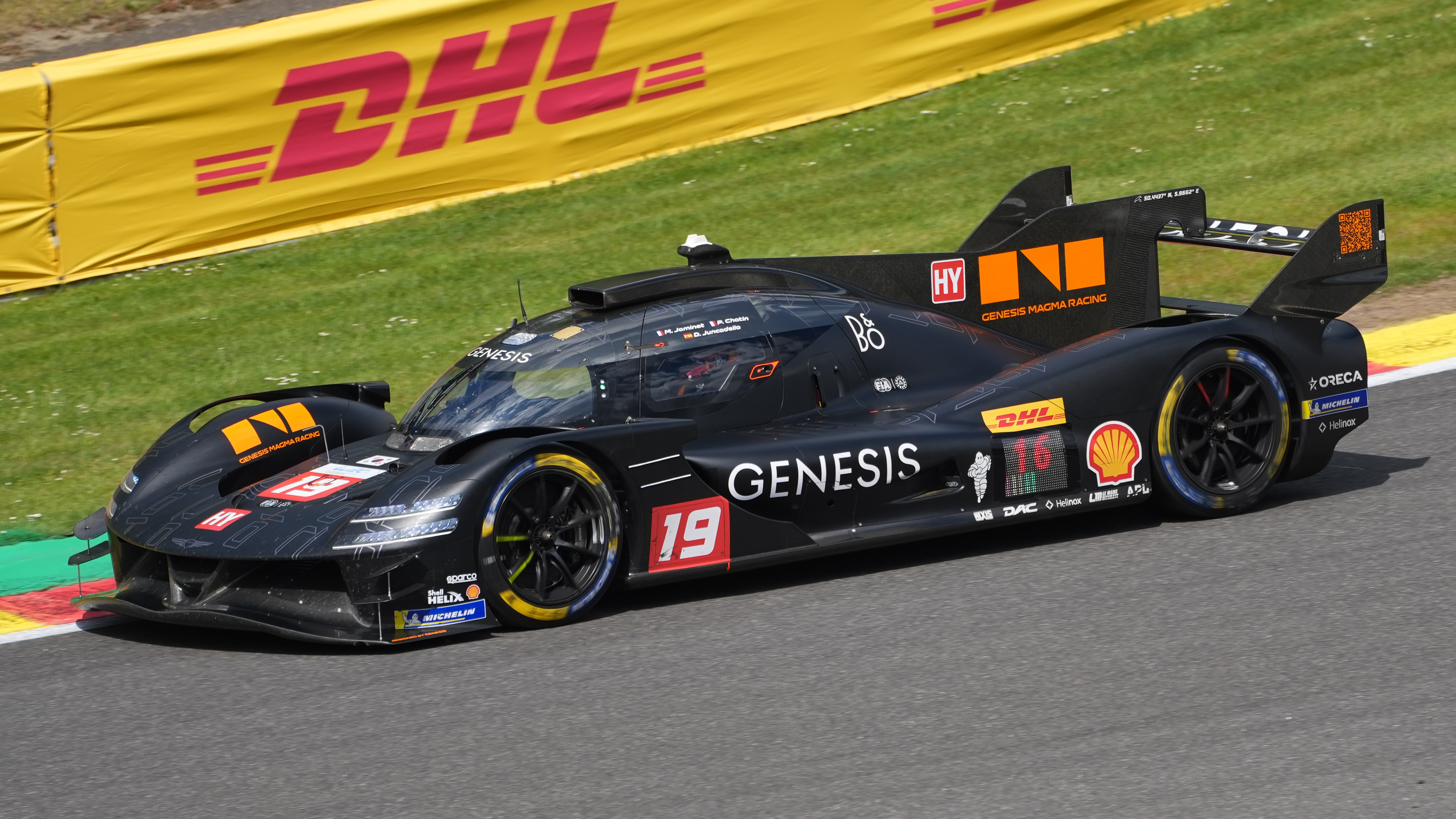
Jaminet's No. 19 Genesis GMR-001 at the 2026 6 Hours of Spa-Francorchamps.

In 2026, Jaminet left Porsche to join Genesis Magma Racing on the Korean marque's FIA WEC debut.

== Personal life ==
Jaminet resided in Differdange, Luxembourg until 2024, when he moved to Andorra la Vella.

== Racing results ==
=== Career summary ===
Season	Series	Team	Races	Wins	Poles	F/Laps	Podiums	Points	Position
2010	F4 Eurocup 1.6	Auto Sport Academy	14	3	3	2	6	112	**3rd**
2011	Eurocup Formula Renault 2.0	Josef Kaufmann Racing	14	0	0	0	0	15	16th
2011	Formula Renault 2.0 NEC	Josef Kaufmann Racing	5	0	0	0	0	27	31st
2012	Peugeot RCZ Racing Cup	Saintéloc Racing	12	4	5	6	9	174	**1st**
2013	FFSA GT Championship	Saintéloc Racing	14	0	0	0	0	28	18th
2014	Peugeot RCZ Racing Cup	JSB Compétition	1	0	0	0	0	0	37th
2015	Porsche Carrera Cup France	Racing Technology	12	4	4	3	6	174	**2nd**
2016	Porsche Supercup	Martinet by Alméras	10	3	3	3	6	146	**3rd**
2016	Porsche Carrera Cup France	Martinet by Alméras	12	10	9	9	12	218	**1st**
2016	Blancpain GT Series Endurance Cup	IMSA Performance	1	0	0	0	0	0	NC
2017	ADAC GT Masters	KÜS Team75 Bernhard	14	1	1	1	2	91	8th
2017	Pirelli World Challenge - GT	GMG Racing	5	0	1	0	0	51	36th
2017	IMSA SportsCar Championship - GTD	Alegra Motorsports	2	0	1	2	0	47	47th
2017	Nürburgring Endurance Series - SP9	Manthey Racing	3	1	1	1	2	0	NC†
2017	24 Hours of Nürburgring - SP9	Manthey Racing	1	0	0	0	0	N/A	DNF
2017	Blancpain GT Series Endurance Cup - Pro-Am	Herberth Motorsport	1	0	0	0	0	7	38th
2017	24H Series - A6	IMSA Performance							
2018	ADAC GT Masters	Precote Herberth Motorsport	14	1	1	1	4	137	**1st**
2018	IMSA SportsCar Championship - GTLM	Porsche GT Team	1	0	0	0	0	25	21st
2018	IMSA SportsCar Championship - GTD	Wright Motorsports	2	0	0	0	0	37	44th
2018	Pirelli World Challenge - GT	GMG Racing	2	0	0	0	0	11	41st
2018	Nürburgring Endurance Series - SP9	Frikadelli Racing Team	2	0	0	0	0	0	NC†
2018	24 Hours of Nürburgring - SP9	Frikadelli Racing Team	1	0	0	0	0	N/A	DNF
2018	Intercontinental GT Challenge	Craft-Bamboo Racing	1	0	0	0	0	1	25th
2018	FIA GT World Cup	Craft-Bamboo Racing	1	0	0	0	0	N/A	7th
2018	24H GT Series - A6	Manthey Racing							
2018	24H GT Series - SPX	Manthey Racing							
2019	Blancpain GT Series Endurance Cup	ROWE Racing	5	0	1	0	0	32	7th
2019	Intercontinental GT Challenge	EBM	2	0	0	0	0	52	6th
2019	Intercontinental GT Challenge	Park Place Motorsports	1	0	0	0	1	52	6th
2019	Intercontinental GT Challenge	ROWE Racing	1	0	0	0	0	52	6th
2019	Intercontinental GT Challenge	Frikadelli Racing Team	1	1	0	0	1	52	6th
2019	IMSA SportsCar Championship - GTLM	Porsche GT Team	3	0	0	0	1	82	19th
2019	24 Hours of Le Mans - GTE Pro	Porsche GT Team	1	0	0	0	0	N/A	7th
2019	Nürburgring Endurance Series - SP9	Frikadelli Racing Team	2	0	0	0	0	13.36	25th
2019	Nürburgring Endurance Series - SP9	Manthey Racing	1	0	0	1	0	13.36	25th
2019	24 Hours of Nürburgring - SP9	Frikadelli Racing Team	1	0	0	0	0	N/A	DNF
2020	GT World Challenge Europe Endurance Cup	GPX Racing	4	0	0	0	2	65	**2nd**
2020	24H GT Series - GT3	GPX Racing							
2020	Intercontinental GT Challenge	Absolute Racing	1	0	0	0	1	45	**2nd**
2020	Intercontinental GT Challenge	GPX Racing	2	0	0	0	2	45	**2nd**
2020	IMSA SportsCar Championship - GTLM	Porsche GT Team	2	0	0	0	1	58	12th
2020	ADAC GT Masters	Precote Herberth Motorsport	2	0	0	0	1	27	27th
2020	Nürburgring Endurance Series - SP9	Manthey Racing	2	0	0	0	0	11.04	49th
2020	24 Hours of Nürburgring - SP9	Frikadelli Racing Team	1	0	0	0	0	N/A	7th
2021	ADAC GT Masters	SSR Performance	14	4	2	2	6	195	**2nd**
2021	GT World Challenge Europe Endurance Cup	GPX Martini Racing	5	1	0	0	1	35	10th
2021	IMSA SportsCar Championship - GTLM	WeatherTech Racing	5	2	0	1	4	1706	5th
2021	24H GT Series - GT3	GPX Racing							
2021	Dubai 24 Hour - GT3-Pro	GPX Racing	1	1	0	0	1	N/A	**1st**
2021	Nürburgring Endurance Series - SP9	Frikadelli Racing Team	1	1	0	0	1	0	NC†
2021	24 Hours of Nürburgring - SP9	Frikadelli Racing Team	1	0	0	0	0	N/A	DNF
2022	IMSA SportsCar Championship - GTD Pro	Pfaff Motorsports	10	5	2	0	8	3497	**1st**
2022	24 Hours of Nürburgring - SP9	Toksport WRT	1	0	0	0	0	N/A	DNF
2022	GT World Challenge Europe Endurance Cup	EMA Motorsport	1	0	0	0	0	2	33rd
2022	24 Hours of Le Mans - LMP2	Team Penske	Reserve driver						
2023	IMSA SportsCar Championship - GTP	Porsche Penske Motorsport	9	2	0	0	4	2691	4th
2023	24 Hours of Le Mans - Hypercar	Porsche Penske Motorsport	1	0	0	0	0	N/A	DNF
2023	Intercontinental GT Challenge	Manthey EMA	1	0	0	0	1	18	19th
2023	24 Hours of Nürburgring - SP9	Lionspeed by Car Collection Motorsport	1	0	0	0	0	N/A	DNF
2024	IMSA SportsCar Championship - GTP	Porsche Penske Motorsport	8	2	0	0	5	2616*	2nd*
2024	GT World Challenge Europe Endurance Cup	SSR Herberth	1	0	0	0	0	4	28th
2024	Nürburgring Langstrecken-Serie - SP9	Dinamic GT							
2025	FIA World Endurance Championship - Hypercar	Porsche Penske Motorsport	6	0	0	0	0	31	18th
2025	IMSA SportsCar Championship - GTP	Porsche Penske Motorsport	9	1	0	2	6	2907	**1st**
2025	GT World Challenge Europe Endurance Cup	Dinamic GT	1	0	0	0	0	0	NC
2026	FIA World Endurance Championship - Hypercar	Genesis Magma Racing							
2026	GT World Challenge Europe Endurance Cup	Herberth Motorsport	1	0	0	0	0	0	NC
2026	IMSA SportsCar Championship - GTD Pro	Manthey Racing	1	0	0	0	0	265	37th
2026–27	Asian Le Mans Series – GT3	Herberth Motorsport						*	*

^{†} As Jaminet was a guest driver, he was ineligible to score points.

=== Complete F4 Eurocup 1.6 results ===
(key) (Races in bold indicate pole position) (Races in italics indicate fastest lap)

Year	1	2	3	4	5	6	7	8	9	10	11	12	13	14	Pos	Points
2010	ALC; 1; 6	ALC; 2; 6	SPA; 1 Ret	SPA; 2; 8	MAG; 1; 3	MAG; 2; 3	**HUN**; **1**; 1	**HUN**; **2**; 1	HOC; 1; 6	HOC; 2; 8	SIL; 1; 7	SIL; 2; 4	**CAT**; **1**; 1	CAT; 2; 2	3rd	112

=== Complete Formula Renault 2.0 NEC results ===
(key) (Races in bold indicate pole position) (Races in italics indicate fastest lap)

Year	Entrant	1	2	3	4	5	6	7	8	9	10	11	12	13	14	15	16	17	18	19	20	DC	Points
2011	Josef Kaufmann Racing	HOC; 1	HOC; 2	HOC; 3	SPA; 1 Ret	SPA; 2; 22	NÜR; 1	NÜR; 2	ASS; 1; 5	ASS; 2; 10	ASS; 3 Ret	OSC; 1	OSC; 2	ZAN; 1	ZAN; 2	MST; 1	MST; 2	MST; 3	MNZ; 1	MNZ; 2	MNZ; 3	31st	27

=== Complete Eurocup Formula Renault 2.0 results ===
(key) (Races in bold indicate pole position; races in italics indicate fastest lap)

Year	Entrant	1	2	3	4	5	6	7	8	9	10	11	12	13	14	DC	Points
2011	Josef Kaufmann Racing	ALC; 1; 4	ALC; 2; 17	SPA; 1 Ret	SPA; 2; 22	NÜR; 1; 29	NÜR; 2 Ret	HUN; 1; 15	HUN; 2; 27	SIL; 1; 9	SIL; 2 Ret	LEC; 1; 16	LEC; 2; 21	CAT; 1; 10	CAT; 2; 25	16th	15

=== Complete ADAC GT Masters Results ===
(key) (Races in bold indicate pole position) (Races in italics indicate fastest lap)

Year	Team	Car	1	2	3	4	5	6	7	8	9	10	11	12	13	14	DC	Points
2017	KÜS TEAM75 Bernhard	Porsche 911 GT3 R	**OSC**; **1**; 1	OSC; 2 Ret	LAU; 1; 7	LAU; 2 Ret	RBR; 1; 7	RBR; 2; 9	ZAN; 1; 8	ZAN; 2; 5	NÜR; 1; 2	NÜR; 2; 10	SAC; 1; 10	SAC; 2; 11	HOC; 1; 4	HOC; 2; 7	8th	91
2018	Precote Herberth Motorsport	Porsche 911 GT3 R	OSC; 1; 5	OSC; 2; 4	MST; 1; 3	MST; 2; 3	RBR; 1; 6	RBR; 2; 9	NÜR; 1; 16	NÜR; 2; 5	ZAN; 1; 12	**ZAN**; **2**; 1	SAC; 1 Ret	SAC; 2; 4	**HOC**; **1**; 2	HOC; 2; 5	1st	137
2020	Precote Herberth Motorsport	Porsche 911 GT3 R	LAU1; 1	LAU1; 2	NÜR; 1	NÜR; 2	HOC; 1	HOC; 2	SAC; 1	SAC; 2	RBR; 1	RBR; 2	LAU2; 1	LAU2; 2	OSC; 1; 5	OSC; 2; 3	27th	27
2021	SSR Performance	Porsche 911 GT3 R	OSC; 1; 7	**OSC**; **2**; 1	RBR; 1; 1	RBR; 2; 6	ZAN; 1; 6	ZAN; 2; 18	LAU; 1; 13	LAU; 2; 12	**SAC**; **1**; 1	SAC; 2; 10	HOC; 1; 3	HOC; 2; 8	NÜR; 1; 2	NÜR; 2; 1	**2nd**	**195**

=== Complete IMSA SportsCar Championship results ===
(key) (Races in bold indicate pole position) (Races in italics indicate fastest lap)

Year	Entrant	Class	Chassis	1	2	3	4	5	6	7	8	9	10	11	12	Rank	Points	Ref
2017	Alegra Motorsports	GTD	Porsche 911 GT3 R	DAY	SEB	LBH	**COA**; 7	DET; 10	WGL	MOS	LIM	ELK	VIR	LAG	PET	47th	47	
2018	Wright Motorsports	GTD	Porsche 911 GT3 R	DAY; 19	SBR; 6	MDO	DET	WGL	MOS	LIM	ELK	VIR	LAG	PET		44th	37	
2018	Porsche GT Team	GTLM	Porsche 911 RSR	DAY	SEB	LBH	MDO	WGL	MOS	LIM	ELK	VIR	LAG	PET; 6		21st	25	
2019	Porsche GT Team	GTLM	Porsche 911 RSR	DAY; 3	SEB; 5	LBH	MDO	WGL	MOS	LIM	ELK	VIR	LAG	PET; 5		19th	82	
2020	Porsche GT Team	GTLM	Porsche 911 RSR-19	DAY; 2	DAY	SEB	ELK	VIR	ATL	MDO	CLT	PET; 5	LGA	SEB		12th	58	
2021	WeatherTech Racing	GTLM	Porsche 911 RSR-19	DAY	SEB; 1	DET	WGL; 5	WGL	LIM; 3	ELK	LGA	LBH; 3	VIR	PET; 1		5th	1706	
2022	Pfaff Motorsports	GTD Pro	Porsche 911 GT3 R	DAY; 1	SEB; 5	LBH; 6	**LGA**; 1	WGL; 3	**MOS**; 1	LIM; 1	ELK; 2	VIR; 1	PET; 3			1st	3497	
2023	Porsche Penske Motorsport	GTP	Porsche 963	DAY; 8	SEB; 3	LBH; 1	MON; 2	**WGL**; 9	MOS; 5	ELK; 7	IMS; 1	PET; 10				4th	2691	
2024	Porsche Penske Motorsport	GTP	Porsche 963	DAY; 4	SEB; 9	LBH; 4	LGA; 1	**DET**; 2	WGL; 3	ELK; 1	IMS; 10	PET; 2				2nd	2869	
2025	Porsche Penske Motorsport	GTP	Porsche 963	DAY; 3	SEB; 2	LBH; 2	LGA; 1	DET; 3	WGL; 4	ELK; 5	IMS; 7	PET; 3				1st	2907	
2026	Manthey Racing	GTD Pro	Porsche 911 GT3 R (992.2)	DAY	SEB	LGA	DET	WGL	MOS	ELK	VIR	IMS	PET; 7			37th	265	

* Season still in progress

=== Complete 24 Hours of Nürburgring results ===
Year	Team	Co-Drivers	Car	Class	Laps	Pos.	Class Pos.
2017	(Germany) Manthey Racing	(Italy) Matteo Cairoli (Germany) Otto Klohs (Germany) Robert Renauer	Porsche 911 GT3 R (991)	SP9	26	DNF	DNF
2018	(Germany) Frikadelli Racing Team	(Germany) Felipe Fernández Laser (Germany) Marco Seefried (Austria) Norbert Siedler	Porsche 911 GT3 R (991)	SP9	69	DNF	DNF
2019	(Germany) Frikadelli Racing Team	(Australia) Matt Campbell (France) Romain Dumas (Germany) Sven Müller	Porsche 911 GT3 R (991.2)	SP9	134	DNF	DNF
2020	(Germany) Frikadelli Racing Team	(Germany) Lance David Arnold (Germany) Lars Kern (Belgium) Maxime Martin	Porsche 911 GT3 R (991.2)	SP9	85	7th	7th
2021	(Germany) Frikadelli Racing Team	(New Zealand) Earl Bamber (Australia) Matt Campbell (United Kingdom) Nick Tandy	Porsche 911 GT3 R (991.2)	SP9	26	DNF	DNF
2022	(Germany) Toksport WRT	(France) Julien Andlauer (Australia) Matt Campbell	Porsche 911 GT3 R (991.2)	SP9	18	DNF	DNF
2023	(Germany) Lionspeed by Car Collection Motorsport	(Australia) Matt Campbell (Germany) Patrick Kolb (France) Patrick Pilet	Porsche 911 GT3 R (992)	SP9	16	DNF	DNF

=== Complete 24 Hours of Spa results ===
Year	Team	Co-Drivers	Car	Class	Laps	Pos.	Class Pos.
2017	(Germany) Herberth Motorsport	(Switzerland) Daniel Allemann (Germany) Ralf Bohn (Germany) Sven Müller	Porsche 911 GT3 R (991)	Pro-Am	546	29th	7th
2019	(Germany) Rowe Racing	(France) Romain Dumas (Germany) Sven Müller	Porsche 911 GT3 R (991.2)	Pro	362	5th	5th
2020	(United Arab Emirates) GPX Racing	(Australia) Matt Campbell (France) Patrick Pilet	Porsche 911 GT3 R (991.2)	Pro	527	4th	4th
2021	(United Arab Emirates) GPX Martini Racing	(New Zealand) Earl Bamber (Australia) Matt Campbell	Porsche 911 GT3 R (991.2)	Pro	246	NC	NC
2022	(Australia) EMA Motorsport	(Australia) Matt Campbell (Brazil) Felipe Nasr	Porsche 911 GT3 R (991.2)	Pro	529	22nd	16th
2024	(Germany) SSR Herberth	(Australia) Matt Campbell (France) Frédéric Makowiecki	Porsche 911 GT3 R (992)	Pro	478	8th	7th
2025	(Italy) Dinamic GT	(Denmark) Bastian Buus (Australia) Matt Campbell	Porsche 911 GT3 R (992)	Pro	60	DNF	DNF
2026	(Germany) Herberth Motorsport	(Germany) Ralf Bohn (Netherlands) Huub van Ejindhoven (Germany) Alfred Renauer	Porsche 911 GT3 R (992.2)	Bronze	384	46th	10th

=== Complete 24 Hours of Le Mans results ===
Year	Team	Co-Drivers	Car	Class	Laps	Pos.	Class Pos.
2019	(United States) Porsche GT Team	(Germany) Sven Müller (Norway) Dennis Olsen	Porsche 911 RSR	GTE; Pro	339	27th	7th
2023	(Germany) Porsche Penske Motorsport	(Brazil) Felipe Nasr (United Kingdom) Nick Tandy	Porsche 963	Hypercar	84	DNF	DNF
2024	(Germany) Porsche Penske Motorsport	(Brazil) Felipe Nasr (United Kingdom) Nick Tandy	Porsche 963	Hypercar	211	DNF	DNF
2025	(Germany) Porsche Penske Motorsport	(France) Julien Andlauer (Denmark) Michael Christensen	Porsche 963	Hypercar	386	6th	6th
2026	(South Korea) Genesis Magma Racing	(France) Paul-Loup Chatin (Spain) Daniel Juncadella	Genesis GMR-001	Hypercar	372	13th	13th

=== Complete Bathurst 12 Hour results ===
Year	Team	Co-Drivers	Car	Class	Laps	Pos.	Class Pos.
2019	(New Zealand) Earl Bamber Motorsport	(France) Romain Dumas (Germany) Sven Müller	Porsche 911 GT3 R	APP	234	DNF	DNF
2020	(China) Absolute Racing	(Australia) Matt Campbell (France) Patrick Pilet	Porsche 911 GT3 R	A-Pro	314	4th	4th
2023	(Australia) Manthey EMA	(Australia) Matt Campbell (Austria) Thomas Preining	Porsche 911 GT3 R	A-Pro	323	2nd	2nd

=== Complete FIA World Endurance Championship results ===
(key) (Races in bold indicate pole position; races in italics indicate fastest lap)

Year	Entrant	Class	Chassis	Engine	1	2	3	4	5	6	7	8	Rank	Points
2025	Porsche Penske Motorsport	Hypercar	Porsche 963	Porsche 4.6 L Turbo V8	QAT; 10	IMO; 11	SPA	LMS; 6	SAP	COA; 10	FUJ; 4	BHR; 14	18th	31
2026	Genesis Magma Racing	Hypercar	Genesis GMR-001	Genesis G8MR 3.2 L Turbo V8	IMO; 17	SPA; 13	LMS; 12	SÃO; 13	COA; 15	FUJ; 11	CAT; 11	MNZ; Ret	28th	0

Sporting positions
Preceded by Maxime Jousse	Porsche Carrera Cup France; Champion; 2016	Succeeded by Julien Andlauer
Preceded by Jules Gounon	ADAC GT Masters Champion; 2018; With: Robert Renauer	Succeeded by Kelvin van der Linde; Patric Niederhauser
Preceded by Antonio García; Jordan Taylor (GTLM)	IMSA SportsCar Championship; GTD Pro Champion; 2022; With: Matt Campbell	Succeeded by Incumbent
