= Franck Matelli =

French racing driver (born 1991)

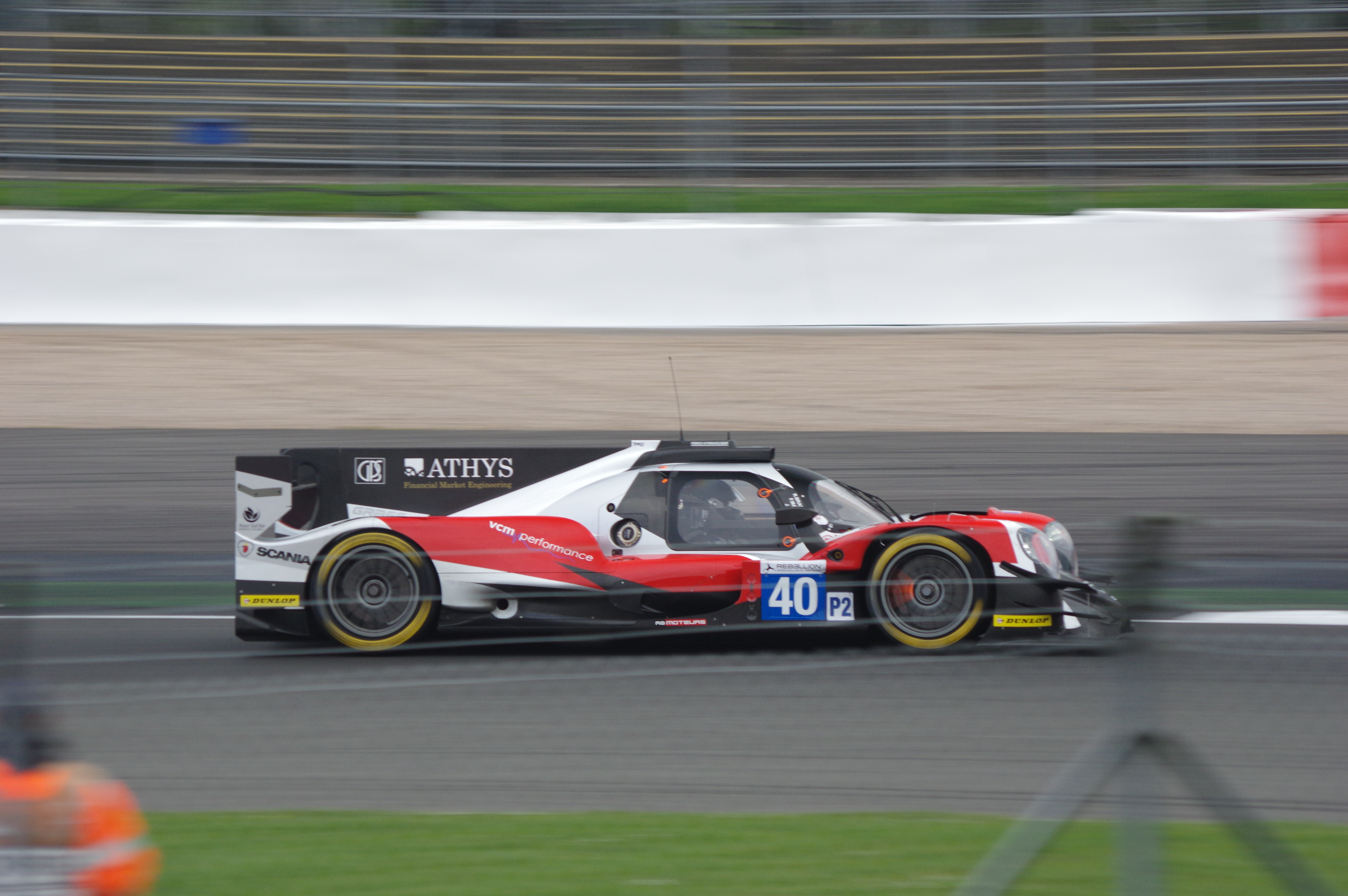
- Matelli in 2017
- Nationality: (France) French
- Born: 9 November 1991 (age 34) Bastia, France

European Le Mans Series
- Categorisation: FIA Silver
- Years active: 2017
- Teams: Graff
- Starts: 2
- Wins: 0
- Podiums: 0
- Poles: 0
- Fastest laps: 0
- Best finish: 15th (LMP2) in 2017

Previous series
- 2016 2009–2010: V de V Challenge Endurance LMP3 LMP2; French F4 Championship

Franck Matelli (born 9 November 1991) is a French racing driver who last competed in the LMP2 class of the European Le Mans Series for Graff.

== Career ==
Born in Corsica, Matelli began karting at the age of ten, competing until 2008 under the tutelage of Olivier Panis. During his first stint in karting, Matelli most notably won the Claude Secq and Mistral trophies in 2008, as well as finishing ninth in that year's Italian Open Masters standings in KZ2.

In 2009, Matelli moved up to single-seaters by racing in the FFSA Academy centrally-run Formul'Academy Euro Series. Starting off the season with podiums at Pau and Spa, Matelli then finished both Monza races on the podium and won the finale at Aragón to end the year fourth in points. In 2010, Matelli stayed in the newly-rebranded F4 Eurocup 1.6 and began the season by taking his maiden pole position at the Aragón opener. Matelli then finished second in race two of the following round at Spa, before winning race one at Magny-Cours and finishing second in race two to move up to second in points behind Stoffel Vandoorne. In the remaining four rounds, Matelli only scored a pair of podiums at the Hockenheimring as he slipped to fifth in the final standings. Following that, Matelli was forced to return to karting for 2011, as he was unable to raise enough budget to step up to either Formula Renault 2.0 or Formula 3. On his return to karting, Matelli won the Championnat Regional PACAC and French titles in the KZ125 class.

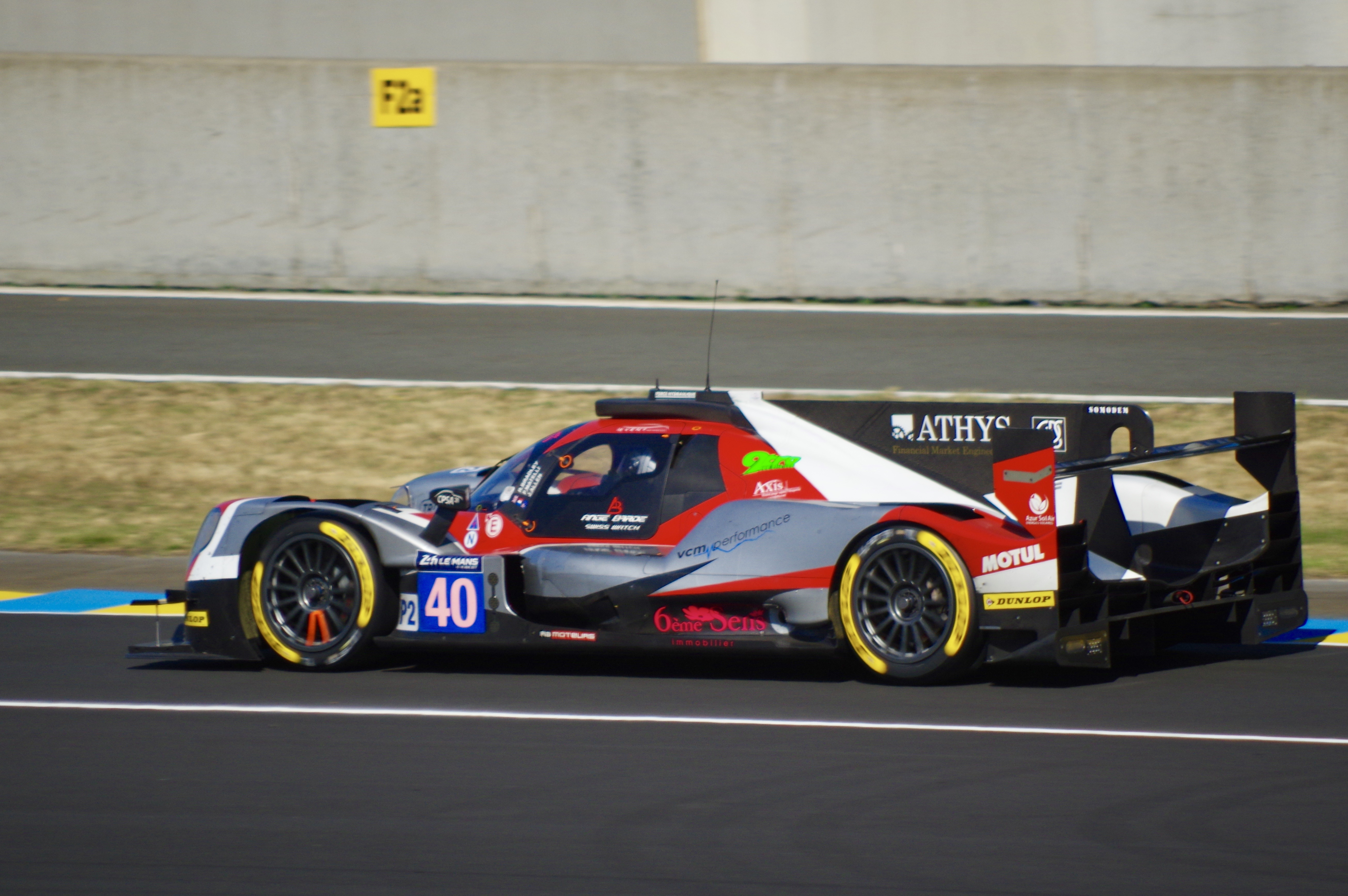
Matelli's last ever race was the 2017 24 Hours of Le Mans, where he finished 5th in LMP2 on debut for Graff.

Five years later, Matelli returned to motorsports after securing sponsorship from Athys, competing in the Magny-Cours round of V de V Challenge Endurance for Panis Barthez Competition, in which he qualified on LMP3 pole and finished fifth overall alongside Eric Debard and Jean-Claude Police. Towards the end of the year, Matelli tested LMP2 machinery for Panis. At the start of 2017, Matelli joined Graff to compete in the non-championship Dubai round of the 24H Proto Series, in which he secured two overall wins alongside Eric Trouillet and Edward Lewis Brauner in a Ligier JS P3. Matelli then remained with Graff to race in the LMP2 class of the European Le Mans Series, sharing an Oreca 07 with James Allen and Richard Bradley. Starting off the year with fourth- and eighth-place finishes at Silverstone and Monza, Matelli finished sixth overall and fifth in LMP2 on his 24 Hours of Le Mans debut, following Rebellion Racing's post-race disqualification. However, that turned out to be his final race, as funding from Athys dried up and Matelli was forced to pull out of motorsport, with his ELMS seat taken by Gustavo Yacamán.

== Karting record ==
=== Karting career summary ===
| Season | Series | Team | Position |
|---|---|---|---|
| 2007 | Championnat de France — KZ2 | | 32nd |
| 2008 | Championnat de France — KZ2 | | 61st |
| 2008 | Coupe de France — KZ125 | | 158th |
| 2008 | Italian Open Masters — KZ2 | | 9th |
| 2011 | Championnat Regional PACAC — KZ125 | | 1st |
| 2011 | Grand Prix Open Karting — KZ2 | Kart In Pro | 42nd |
| 2011 | Championnat de France — KZ125 | | 1st |

== Racing record ==
=== Racing career summary ===
| Season | Series | Team | Races | Wins | Poles | F/Laps | Podiums | Points | Position |
|---|---|---|---|---|---|---|---|---|---|
| 2009 | Formul'Academy Euro Series | FFSA Academy | 14 | 1 | 0 | 3 | 5 | 98 | 4th |
| 2010 | F4 Eurocup 1.6 | FFSA Academy | 14 | 1 | 2 | 2 | 5 | 96 | 5th |
| 2016 | V de V Challenge Endurance – LMP3 | Panis Barthez Competition | 1 | 0 | 1 | 0 | 0 | | |
| 2017 | 24H Proto Series – P3 | Graff | 3 | 2 | 0 | 0 | 3 | 0 | NC† |
| 2017 | European Le Mans Series – LMP2 | Graff | 2 | 0 | 0 | 0 | 0 | 16 | 15th |
| 2017 | 24 Hours of Le Mans – LMP2 | Graff | 1 | 0 | 0 | 0 | 0 | —N/a | 5th |

^{†} As Matelli was a guest driver, he was ineligible to score points.

=== Complete F4 Eurocup 1.6 results ===
(key) (Races in bold indicate pole position) (Races in italics indicate fastest lap)

| Year | 1 | 2 | 3 | 4 | 5 | 6 | 7 | 8 | 9 | 10 | 11 | 12 | 13 | 14 | Pos | Points |
|---|---|---|---|---|---|---|---|---|---|---|---|---|---|---|---|---|
| 2009 | VAL; 1; 8 | VAL; 2; 7 | PAU; 1; 4 | PAU; 2; 3 | OSC; 1; 6 | OSC; 2 Ret | SPA; 1; 3 | SPA; 2; 8 | MAG; 1; 5 | MAG; 2; 7 | MNZ; 1; 3 | MNZ; 2; 2 | ALC; 1; 4 | ALC; 2; 1 | 4th | 98 |
| 2010 | **ALC**; **1**; 5 | ALC; 2 Ret | SPA; 1; 6 | SPA; 2; 2 | **MAG**; **1**; 1 | MAG; 2; 2 | HUN; 1; 7 | HUN; 2; 5 | HOC; 1; 3 | HOC; 2; 3 | SIL; 1; 9 | SIL; 2; 17 | CAT; 1; 7 | CAT; 2; 5 | 5th | 96 |

=== Complete European Le Mans Series results ===
| Year | Entrant | Class | Chassis | Engine | 1 | 2 | 3 | 4 | 5 | 6 | Rank | Points |
|---|---|---|---|---|---|---|---|---|---|---|---|---|
| 2017 | Graff | LMP2 | Oreca 07 | Gibson GK428 4.2 L V8 | SIL; 4 | MNZ; 8 | RBR | LEC | SPA | ALG | 15th | 16 |

=== Complete 24 Hours of Le Mans results ===
| Year | Team | Co-Drivers | Car | Class | Laps | Pos. | Class Pos. |
|---|---|---|---|---|---|---|---|
| 2017 | (France) Graff | (Australia) James Allen (United Kingdom) Richard Bradley | Oreca 07-Gibson | LMP2 | 361 | 6th | 5th |
