= Graff Racing =

French motor sport team

(France) Graff Racing
- Founded: 1985
- Base: Morangis, Essonne, France
- Team principal(s): Pascal Rauturier
- Current series: Ultimate Cup Series
- Former series: Eurocup Formula Renault 2.0; Formula Le Mans Cup; French Formula Three Championship; World Series by Nissan; World Series Lights; Asian Le Mans Series; European Le Mans Series; Michelin Le Mans Cup
- Teams' Championships: 1991 French Formula Three season 1996 French Formula Three season 1997 French Formula Three season 2002 Formula Renault 2000 Eurocup season
- Drivers' Championships: 2002 Formula Renault 2000 Eurocup season (Salignon)

Graff Racing is an auto racing team based in France. The team was founded in 1985 by French racing driver Jean-Philippe Grand, who had competed under his own name since the late 1970s and won the French Formula Ford in 1984. As of 2011, the team has returned to endurance racing, competing in the Blancpain Endurance Series, Porsche Carrera Cup, and European Le Mans Series.

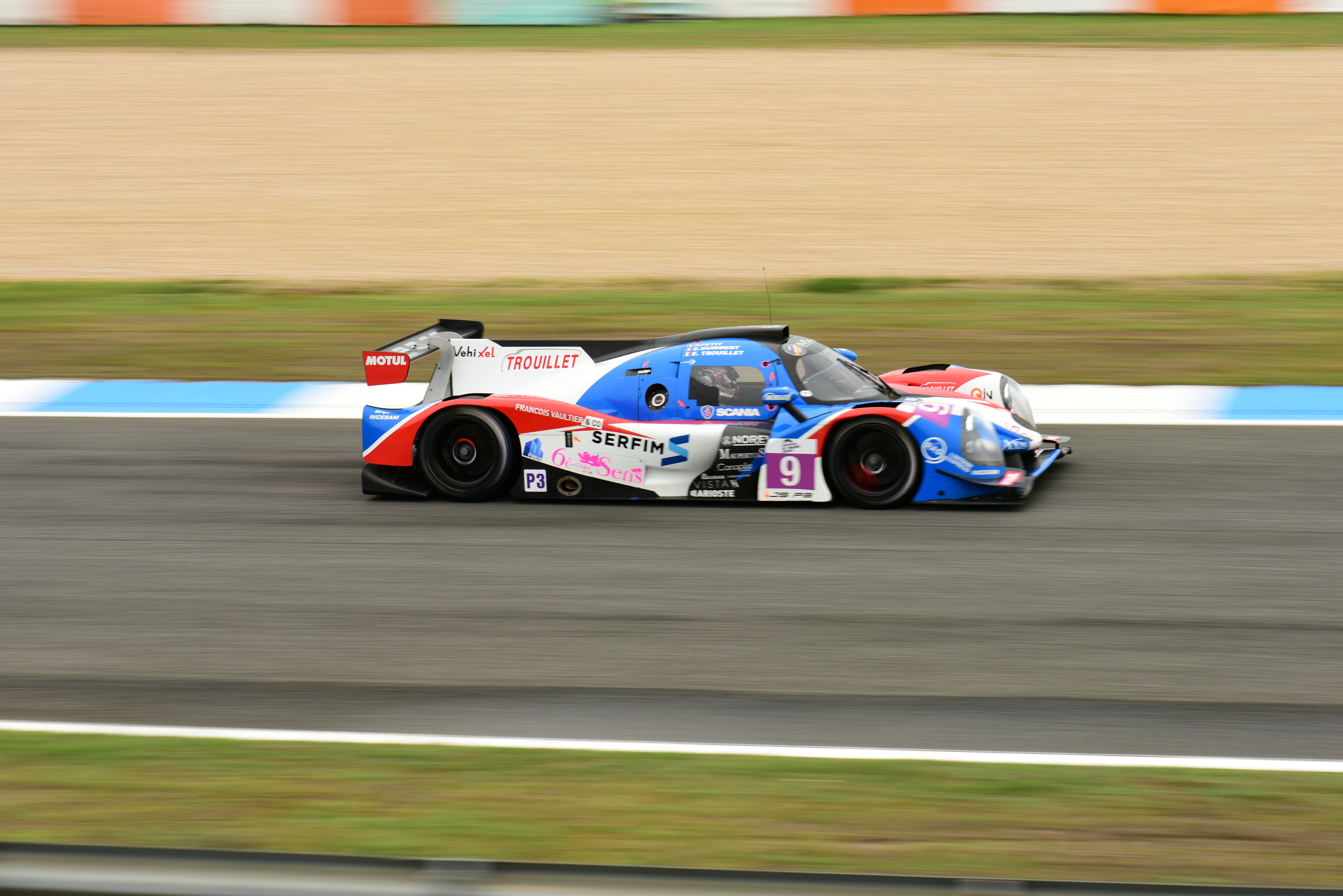
A Graff Racing Ligier JS P3 at the 2016 ELMS 4 Hours of Estoril in Portugal.

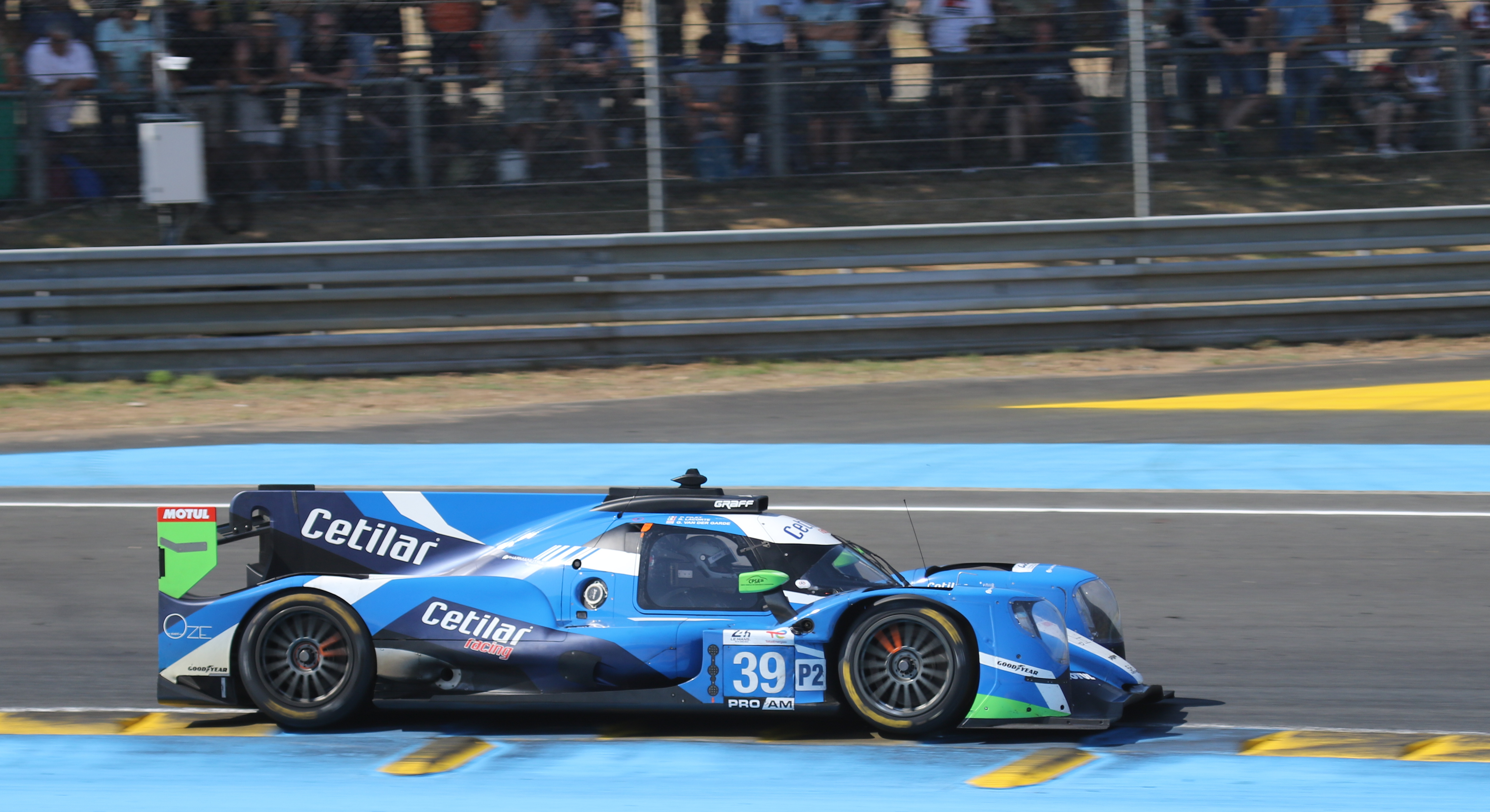
Graff Racing's Oreca 07 at the 2023 24 Hours of Le Mans.

== Racing record ==
=== 24 Hours of Le Mans results ===
Year	Entrant	No.	Car	Drivers	Class	Laps	Pos.	Class Pos.
1984	(France) J.-P. Grand (private entrant)	93	Rondeau M379C-Cosworth	(France) Jean-Philippe Grand (Belgium) Jean-Paul Libert (Belgium) Pascal Witmeur	Gr.C2	310	11th	2nd
1985	(France) J.-P. Grand (private entrant)	67	Rondeau M482-Cosworth	(France) Pierre de Thoisy (France) Patrick Gonin (Belgium) Pascal Witmeur	Gr.C1	143	DNF	DNF
1986	(France) Graff Racing	47	Rondeau M482-Cosworth	(France) Jacques Goudchaux (France) Jean-Philippe Grand (France) Marc Menant	Gr.C1	299	13th	9th
1987	(France) Graff Racing	40	Rondeau M482-Cosworth	(France) Jean-Philippe Grand (Belgium) Gaston Rahier (France) Jacques Terrien	Gr.C1	260	12th	6th
1988	(France) Graff Racing	131	Spice-Fiero SE86C-Cosworth	(France) Jean-Philippe Grand (France) Maurice Guenoun (France) Jacques Terrien	Gr.C2	263	DNF	DNF
1989	(France) Graff Racing	104	Spice SE89C-Cosworth	(France) Jean-Philippe Grand (France) Rémy Pochauvin (France) Jean-Luc Roy	Gr.C2	292	19th	5th
1990	(France) Graff Racing	102	Spice SE89C-Cosworth	(France) Jean-Philippe Grand (France) Xavier Lapeyre (France) Michel Maisonneuve	Gr.C2	291	23rd	2nd
1991	(France) Graff Racing (France) Automobiles Louis Descartes	39	Spice SE89C-Cosworth	(France) Jean-Philippe Grand (France) Xavier Lapeyre (France) Michel Maisonneuve	Gr.C1	163	DNF	DNF
1993	(France) Graff Racing	24	Spice SE89C-Cosworth	(France) Richard Balandras (France) Jean-Bernard Bouvet (France) Bruno Miot	Gr.C2	288	20th	10th
2017	(France) Graff	39	Oreca 07-Gibson	(France) Enzo Guibbert (France) Eric Trouillet (United Kingdom) James Winslow	LMP2	318	43rd	18th
2017	(France) Graff	40	Oreca 07-Gibson	(Australia) James Allen (United Kingdom) Richard Bradley (France) Franck Matelli	LMP2	361	6th	5th
2018	(France) Graff-SO24	39	Oreca 07-Gibson	(France) Vincent Capillaire (France) Tristan Gommendy (Switzerland) Jonathan Hirschi	LMP2	366	6th	2nd
2018	(Russia) G-Drive Racing	40	Oreca 07-Gibson	(Australia) James Allen (France) Enzo Guibbert (Mexico) José Gutierrez	LMP2	197	DNF	DNF
2019	(France) Graff	39	Oreca 07-Gibson	(France) Vincent Capillaire (France) Tristan Gommendy (Switzerland) Jonathan Hirschi	LMP2	362	14th	9th
2020	(France) SO24-HAS by Graff	39	Oreca 07-Gibson	(Australia) James Allen (France) Vincent Capillaire (France) Charles Milesi	LMP2	357	DNF	DNF
2021	(France) SO24-DIROB by Graff	39	Oreca 07-Gibson	(France) Vincent Capillaire (France) Arnold Robin (France) Maxime Robin	LMP2 (Pro-Am)	352	19th	5th
2021	(France) Association SRT41	84	Oreca 07-Gibson	(Japan) Takuma Aoki (Belgium) Nigel Bailly (France) Matthieu Lahaye	CDNT	334	32nd	–
2022	(France) Graff Racing	39	Oreca 07-Gibson	(Switzerland) David Droux (Switzerland) Sébastien Page (France) Eric Trouillet	LMP2 (Pro-Am)	344	33rd	7th
2023	(France) Graff Racing	39	Oreca 07-Gibson	(Netherlands) Giedo van der Garde (Italy) Roberto Lacorte (France) Patrick Pilet	LMP2 (Pro-Am)	303	37th	4th
