= 2015 Australian Rally Championship =

2015 Australian Rally season

Seasons
- ← 2014 2016 →

The 2015 East Coast Bullbars Australian Rally Championship is the 48th season of the Australian Rally Championship. The season began on 27 March at the Quit Forest Rally in Nannup, Western Australia and will end at the Scouts Rally in South Australia. The championship consists of five events including the two international events of Rally Australia and the International Rally of Queensland. The championship is divided into outright (2WD), 4WD Rally Series and Classic Rally Challenge classes. 2014 champion Scott Pedder did not return to defend his title after entering into the WRC-2 Championship.

== Calendar ==
The calendar has changed slightly from the 2014 season.

Rnd.	Dates		Rally name	Rally base
1	27–29 March	Western Australia	Quit Forest Rally	Nannup, Western Australia
2	15–17 May	Australian Capital Territory	National Capital Rally	Canberra, Australian Capital Territory
3	19–21 June	Queensland	International Rally of Queensland	Sunshine Coast, Queensland
4	10–13 September	New South Wales	Rally Australia	Coffs Harbour, New South Wales
5	23–25 October	South Australia	Scouts Rally SA	Barossa Valley, South Australia

== Teams and drivers ==
=== Outright ARC Teams ===
Teams and drivers competing in the outright (2WD) ARC championship

Team	Vehicle	Driver	Co-driver	Class	Rounds
Team Citroen Australia	Citroen DS3 R3T	Victoria Eli Evans	Queensland Glen Weston	R3	1–3
Tankformers	Honda Civic Type R	Victoria Simon Evans	Western Australia Ben Searcy	G2	1
Tankformers	Honda Jazz	Victoria Simon Evans	Western Australia Ben Searcy	G2	2–3
Opti-Coat Rally Team	Ford Fiesta ST	Victoria Steven Mackenzie	Victoria Brett Mackenzie	G2	1–3
Innate Motorsport	Citroen DS3 R3T	Australian Capital Territory Adrian Coppin	Queensland Erin Kelly	R3	1–3
Australian Truck Performance	Citroen DS3 R3T	New South Wales Tony Sullens	New South Wales Julia Barkley	R3	1–3
Hi-Tec Oils Australia	Renault Clio R3	New South Wales Molly Taylor	Western Australia Bill Hayes	G2	1–3
AJE	Volkswagen Polo Vivo	Victoria Ashlea James	South Australia Kathryn Catford	G2	1
AJE	Volkswagen Polo Vivo	Victoria Ashlea James	Australian Capital Territory Tim Batton	G2	2–3

=== 4WD Rally Series Teams ===
Teams and drivers competing in the 4WD ARC championship

Team	Vehicle	Driver	Co-driver	Class	Rounds
Activ Rallysport	Mitsubishi Lancer Evo X	Victoria Justin Dowel	Victoria Matthew Lee	P5U	1
Activ Rallysport	Hyundai i20 Proto	Victoria Justin Dowel	Victoria Matthew Lee	G4	2
NOTT Racing	Mitsubishi Lancer Evo IX RS	South Australia Henry Nott	South Australia Daniel Young	P5U	1
Pedders Suspension Rally Team	Volkswagen Polo S2000	Victoria Mark Pedder	New South Wales Dale Moscatt	S2000	1
Pedders Suspension Rally Team	Peugeot 208 Maxi	Victoria Mark Pedder	New South Wales Dale Moscatt	AP4	2–3
DK Earthworks	Subaru Impreza WRX	Western Australia Dylan King	Western Australia Lee Tierey	P5U	1
S Technic	Subaru Impreza WRX STi	Western Australia Doug Tostevin	Western Australia Tamara Adams	P5U	1
Platinum Automotive	Mitsubishi Lancer Evo IX	Western Australia Robert Webber	Western Australia Toni Feaver	P5U	1
Maximum Motorsport	Subaru Impreza WRX STi	Western Australia Brad Markovic	Western Australia Glenn Macneall	P5U	1
Repco Rally Team	Mitsubishi Lancer Evo X	Australian Capital Territory Mick Patton	Australian Capital Territory Bernie Webb	P5U	1–3
Maximum Motorsport	Subaru Impreza WRX STi	Western Australia John O'Dowd	Western Australia Philip Conneely	P5U	1
S Technic	Subaru Impreza WRX	Western Australia Scott Mackenzie	Western Australia Troy Maclean	P6U	1
Shamrock Motorsport	Mitsubishi Lancer Evo IX	New South Wales Richie Dalton	Queensland John Allen	P5U	2
Marcus Walkem	Mitsubishi Lancer Evo IX	Tasmania Marcus Walkem	Tasmania Scott Walkem	P5U	2
BP Ultimate Racing	Mitsubishi Lancer Evo IX	Queensland Michael Bailey	Queensland Matt Harriott	P5	2–3
Fibertech Medical Australia P/L	Mitsubishi Lancer Evo IX	New South Wales Gerald Schofield	Australian Capital Territory Ellie Yates	P5U	2
Fibertech Medical Australia P/L	Mitsubishi Lancer Evo IX	New South Wales Gerald Schofield	Queensland Catriona Kelly	P5U	3
Kosciusko Automotive	Subaru Impreza WRX	New South Wales Andrew Penny	New South Wales Jeffery Mathes	P5U	2
Justin Hatton	Mitsubishi Lancer Evo IX	New South Wales Justin Hatton	New South Wales Tim Joas	P5U	2
777 Rallysport	Mitsubishi Lancer Evo V	South Australia Guy Tyler	South Australia Steve Fisher	P6U	2
Alliance Motorsport	Subaru Impreza WRX	New South Wales Peter Dunn	New South Wales Drew Smythe	P6	2
iLAB Australia	Mitsubishi Lancer Evo VIII	Queensland Kent Lawrence	Queensland James Wilson	P5	3

=== Classic Rally Challenge Teams ===
Teams and drivers competing in the Classic ARC championship

Team	Vehicle	Driver	Co-driver	Class	Rounds
V-Sport Canberra	Toyota Celica RA40	Australian Capital Territory Neal Bates	New South Wales Coral Taylor	C1	1–2
Baden Motorsport	Toyota Celica RA40	Queensland Clay Badenoch	Queensland Andrew Dunbar	C1	1–3
SW Motorsport	Nissan Stanza	New South Wales Trevor Stilling	Australian Capital Territory Col Trinder	C1	1
Goodyear Autocare Fyshwick	Nissan Stanza	New South Wales Trevor Stilling	Queensland Catriona Kelly	C1	2
Miles Landscaping	Holden Commodore	Western Australia Graeme Miles	Western Australia Kathy Miles	C1	1–2
Jandal Sport	Nissan Bluebird	Australian Capital Territory Brett Stephens	New South Wales Tony Brandon	C1	2
GAME OVER	BMW M3 E30	Queensland Tony Quinn	South Australia Kate Catford	C2	2–3
RallyNSW	Toyota Corolla GT	New South Wales Charlie Drake	Australian Capital Territory James Thornburn	C1	2
Max Roberts	Ford Escort MkII	New South Wales Max Roberts	New Zealand Dave Devonport	C1	2
Brian Hilton Motorsport	Toyota Corolla KE35	New South Wales Josh Hilton	New South Wales Rodney Vanderpool	C2	2
Triple C Motorsport	Toyota Celica TA22	Queensland Chris Harbeck	Queensland Tony Best	C1	3

== Rally summaries ==
=== Round 1 — Quit Forest Rally ===
ECB ARC Heat results

Heat	Podium finishers				Statistics	
Heat	Pos.	Drivers	Team	Time	Stages	Length
1	1	New South Wales Molly Taylor; Western Australia Bill Hayes	AUS Hi-Tec Oils Australia (Renault Clio R3)	1:07:54.1	10	102.02 km
1	2	Victoria Eli Evans; Queensland Glen Weston	AUS Team Citroen Australia (Citroen DS3 R3T)	1:08:09.6	10	102.02 km
1	3	Victoria Simon Evans; Western Australia Ben Searcy	AUS Tankformers (Honda Civic Type R)	1:10:10.7	10	102.02 km

Heat	Podium finishers				Statistics	
Heat	Pos.	Drivers	Team	Time	Stages	Length
2	1	Victoria Eli Evans; Queensland Glen Weston	AUS Team Citroen Australia (Citroen DS3 R3T)	1:11:08.8	9	113.14 km
2	2	Victoria Simon Evans; Western Australia Ben Searcy	AUS Tankformers (Honda Civic Type R)	1:11:55.5	9	113.14 km
2	3	New South Wales Molly Taylor; Western Australia Bill Hayes	AUS Hi-Tec Oils Australia (Renault Clio R3)	1:12:08.8	9	113.14 km

ECB ARC Power Stage results

Pos.	Drivers	Team	Final time	Points
1	Victoria Simon Evans; Western Australia Ben Searcy	AUS Tankformers (Honda Civic Type R)	2:39.75	5
2	New South Wales Tony Sullens; New South Wales Julia Barkley	AUS Australian Truck Performance (Citroen DS3 R3T)	2:41.00	3
3	Australian Capital Territory Adrian Coppin; Queensland Erin Kelly	AUS Innate Motorsport (Citroen DS3 R3T)	2:41.26	1

Former champion Eli Evans began the season with a win at Quit Forest Rally after taking second in heat one and first in heat two. Molly Taylor made history becoming the first female driver to win a heat in the Australian Rally Championship taking heat one despite having to crawl through the final two stages with damaged steering. Four time champion Simon Evans marked his return to the championship with a win in the power stage and third overall with a third and second in heat one and two respectively. Former teammates Adrian Coppin and Tony Sullens both rolled out of the lead in their Citroen DS3 R3T's in heat one before the cars were repaired for heat two.

=== Round 2 — National Capital Rally ===
ECB ARC Heat results

Heat	Podium finishers				Statistics	
Heat	Pos.	Drivers	Team	Time	Stages	Length
1	1	New South Wales Tony Sullens; New South Wales Julia Barkley	AUS Truck Performance (Citroen DS3 R3T)	1:03:47.1	6	101.68 km
1	2	New South Wales Molly Taylor; Western Australia Bill Hayes	AUS Hi-Tec Oils Australia (Renault Clio R3)	1:03:49.1	6	101.68 km
1	3	Australian Capital Territory Adrian Coppin; Queensland Erin Kelly	AUS Innate Motorsport (Citroen DS3 R3T)	1:04:08.2	6	101.68 km

Heat	Podium finishers				Statistics	
Heat	Pos.	Drivers	Team	Time	Stages	Length
2	1	Victoria Eli Evans; Queensland Glen Weston	AUS Team Citroen Australia (Citroen DS3 R3T)	1:19:27.5	6	105.76 km
2	2	New South Wales Molly Taylor; Western Australia Bill Hayes	AUS Hi-Tec Oils Australia (Renault Clio R3)	1:20:45.3	6	105.76 km
2	3^{1}	Australian Capital Territory Harry Bates; Queensland John McCarthy	AUS Neal Bates Motorsport (Toyota Corolla)	1:22:06.5	6	105.76 km

ECB ARC Power Stage results

Pos.	Drivers	Team	Final time	Points
1	Victoria Eli Evans; Queensland Glen Weston	AUS Team Citroen Australia (Citroen DS3 R3T)	1:53.55	5
2	Victoria Simon Evans; Western Australia Ben Searcy	AUS Tankformers (Honda Jazz)	1:56.26	3
3	Australian Capital Territory Adrian Coppin; Queensland Erin Kelly	AUS Innate Motorsport (Citroen DS3 R3T)	1:57.07	1

-->

Notes

- ^1 – Harry Bates was ineligible for championship points

== Results and standings ==
=== Australian Rally Championship for Drivers ===
Points are awarded to the top twenty classified finishers. Bonus points are awarded to the top three in Power stage and winner of the most stages.

Position	1st	2nd	3rd	4th	5th	6th	7th	8th	9th	10th	11th	12th	13th	14th	15th	16th	17th	18th	19th	20th
Points	40	34	30	26	22	20	18	16	14	12	10	9	8	7	6	5	4	3	2	1

Pos.	Driver	WA		ACT		QLD			NSW				SA			Total
Pos.	Driver	H1	H2	H1	H2	H1	H2	Ove.	H1	H2	H3	Ove.	H1	H2	H3	Total
1	Victoria Eli Evans	2	1 ^{1}	Ret ^{5}	1 ^{1}	1	2	1 ^{6}	1	1	1	1 ^{1}				305
2	New South Wales Molly Taylor	1	3	2	2	3	4	3	3	3	2	3 ^{1}				274
3	Australian Capital Territory Adrian Coppin	7 ^{1}	5	3 ^{1}	4	2	3	2	4	4	4	4				229
4	Victoria Steven Mackenzie	6	4	4	5	4	5	4	2	2	3	2				227
5	Victoria Ashlea James	4	7	Ret	Ret	5	6	5	5	5	5	5				142
6	New South Wales Tony Sullens	5 ^{3}	6	1	3	Ret	7	Ret ^{1}	6	Ret	Ret	Ret ^{3}				138
7	Victoria Simon Evans	3 ^{5}	2	5 ^{3}	DNS	Ret	1	Ret ^{3}	Ret	Ret	Ret	Ret ^{5}				122

Key
Colour	Result
Gold	Winner
Silver	2nd place
Bronze	3rd place
Green	Points finish
Blue	Non-points finish
Blue	Non-classified finish (NC)
Purple	Did not finish (Ret)
Black	Excluded (EX)
Black	Disqualified (DSQ)
White	Did not start (DNS)
White	Cancelled (C)
Blank	Withdrew entry from the event (WD)

=== Australian Rally Championship for Co-drivers ===
Points are awarded to the top twenty classified finishers. Bonus points are awarded to the top three in Power stage and winner of the most stages.

Position	1st	2nd	3rd	4th	5th	6th	7th	8th	9th	10th	11th	12th	13th	14th	15th	16th	17th	18th	19th	20th
Points	40	34	30	26	22	20	18	16	14	12	10	9	8	7	6	5	4	3	2	1

Pos.	Driver	WA		ACT		QLD			NSW				SA			Total
Pos.	Driver	H1	H2	H1	H2	H1	H2	Ove.	H1	H2	H3	Ove.	H1	H2	H3	Total
1	Western Australia Bill Hayes	1	3	2	2											138
2	Queensland Glen Weston	2	1 ^{1}	Ret ^{5}	1 ^{1}											121
3	New South Wales Julia Barkley	5 ^{3}	6	1	3											115
4	Queensland Erin Kelly	7 ^{1}	5	3	4											98
5	Western Australia Ben Searcy	3 ^{5}	2	5 ^{3}	DNS											94
6	Victoria Brent Mackenzie	6	4	4	5											94
7	South Australia Kathryn Catford	4	7													44
	Australian Capital Territory Tim Batton			Ret	Ret											0

Key
Colour	Result
Gold	Winner
Silver	2nd place
Bronze	3rd place
Green	Points finish
Blue	Non-points finish
Blue	Non-classified finish (NC)
Purple	Did not finish (Ret)
Black	Excluded (EX)
Black	Disqualified (DSQ)
White	Did not start (DNS)
White	Cancelled (C)
Blank	Withdrew entry from the event (WD)

=== Australian 4WD Rally Series for Drivers ===
Points are awarded to the top twenty classified finishers. Bonus points are awarded to the top three in Power stage and winner of the most stages. The best three events go towards final championship points.

Position	1st	2nd	3rd	4th	5th	6th	7th	8th	9th	10th	11th	12th	13th	14th	15th	16th	17th	18th	19th	20th
Points	40	34	30	26	22	20	18	16	14	12	10	9	8	7	6	5	4	3	2	1

Pos.	Driver	WA		ACT		QLD			NSW				SA			Total	Best 3
Pos.	Driver	H1	H2	H1	H2	H1	H2	Ove.	H1	H2	H3	Ove.	H1	H2	H3	Total	Best 3
1	Australian Capital Territory Mick Patton	2	1	1	2											148	148
2	Victoria Justin Dowell	6 ^{3}	3	2 ^{1}	3 ^{1}											119	119
3	Tasmania Marcus Walkem			3 ^{3}	1											73	73
4	Western Australia Brad Markovic	1	5													62	62
5	Western Australia Doug Tostevin	7 ^{5}	2 ^{1}													58	58
6	South Australia Guy Tyler			4	4											52	52
7	Western Australia Robert Webber	3	6													50	50
8	Western Australia Scott McKenzie	5	4													48	48
9	New South Wales Justin Hatton			5	5											44	44
10	New South Wales Gerald Schofield			6	7											38	38
11	New South Wales Peter Dunn			7	6											38	38
12	Victoria Mark Pedder	4	Ret	Ret	Ret											26	26
13	New South Wales Andrew Penny			8	Ret											16	16
14	Queensland Michael Bailey			9												14	14
15	New South Wales Richie Dalton			Ret ^{5}	DNS											5	5
16	Western Australia Dylan King	Ret ^{1}	DNS													1	1
	Western Australia John O'Dowd	Ret	Ret													0	0
	South Australia Henry Nott	Ret	DNS													0	0

Key
Colour	Result
Gold	Winner
Silver	2nd place
Bronze	3rd place
Green	Points finish
Blue	Non-points finish
Blue	Non-classified finish (NC)
Purple	Did not finish (Ret)
Black	Excluded (EX)
Black	Disqualified (DSQ)
White	Did not start (DNS)
White	Cancelled (C)
Blank	Withdrew entry from the event (WD)

=== Australian 4WD Rally Series for Co-drivers ===
Points are awarded to the top twenty classified finishers. Bonus points are awarded to the top three in Power stage and winner of the most stages. The best three events go towards final championship points.

Position	1st	2nd	3rd	4th	5th	6th	7th	8th	9th	10th	11th	12th	13th	14th	15th	16th	17th	18th	19th	20th
Points	40	34	30	26	22	20	18	16	14	12	10	9	8	7	6	5	4	3	2	1

Pos.	Driver	WA		ACT		QLD			NSW				SA			Total	Best 3
Pos.	Driver	H1	H2	H1	H2	H1	H2	Ove.	H1	H2	H3	Ove.	H1	H2	H3	Total	Best 3
1	Australian Capital Territory Bernie Webb	2	1	1	2											148	148
2	Victoria Matt Lee	6 ^{3}	3	2 ^{1}	3 ^{1}											119	119
3	Tasmania Scott Walkem			3 ^{3}	1											73	73
4	Western Australia Glenn Macneall	1	5													62	62
5	Western Australia Tamara Adams	7 ^{5}	2 ^{1}													58	58
6	South Australia Steve Fisher			4	4											52	52
7	Western Australia Toni Feaver	3	6													50	50
8	Western Australia Troy Maclean	5	4													48	48
9	New South Wales Tim Joas			5	5											44	44
10	Australian Capital Territory Ellie Yates			6	7											38	38
11	New South Wales Nicole Bryan			7	6											38	38
12	New South Wales Dale Moscatt	4	Ret	Ret	Ret											26	26
13	New South Wales Jeffery Mathes			8	Ret											16	16
14	Queensland Matt Harriott			9	DNS											16	16
15	Queensland John Allen			Ret ^{5}	DNS											5	5
16	Western Australia Lee Tierney	Ret ^{1}	DNS													1	1
	Western Australia Philip Conneely	Ret	Ret													0	0
	South Australia Daniel Young	Ret	DNS													0	0

Key
Colour	Result
Gold	Winner
Silver	2nd place
Bronze	3rd place
Green	Points finish
Blue	Non-points finish
Blue	Non-classified finish (NC)
Purple	Did not finish (Ret)
Black	Excluded (EX)
Black	Disqualified (DSQ)
White	Did not start (DNS)
White	Cancelled (C)
Blank	Withdrew entry from the event (WD)

=== Australian Classic Rally Challenge for Drivers ===
Points are awarded to the top twenty classified finishers. A bonus point is awarded winner of the most stages during an event. The best three events go towards final championship points.

Position	1st	2nd	3rd	4th	5th	6th	7th	8th	9th	10th	11th	12th	13th	14th	15th	16th	17th	18th	19th	20th
Points	40	34	30	26	22	20	18	16	14	12	10	9	8	7	6	5	4	3	2	1

Pos.	Driver	WA		ACT		QLD			NSW				SA			Total	Best 3
Pos.	Driver	H1	H2	H1	H2	H1	H2	Ove.	H1	H2	H3	Ove.	H1	H2	H3	Total	Best 3
1	Australian Capital Territory Neal Bates	1	1 ^{1}	1	1 ^{1}											162	162
2	Queensland Clay Badenoch	2	2	4	2											128	128
3	New South Wales Trevor Stilling	3	3	5	4											108	108
4	Western Australia Graeme Miles	4	4	7	6											90	90
5	Queensland Tony Quinn			3	3											60	60
6	New South Wales Max Roberts			6	5											42	42
7	Australian Capital Territory Brett Stephens			2	Ret											34	34
	New South Wales Josh Hilton			Ret	DNS											0	0

Key
Colour	Result
Gold	Winner
Silver	2nd place
Bronze	3rd place
Green	Points finish
Blue	Non-points finish
Blue	Non-classified finish (NC)
Purple	Did not finish (Ret)
Black	Excluded (EX)
Black	Disqualified (DSQ)
White	Did not start (DNS)
White	Cancelled (C)
Blank	Withdrew entry from the event (WD)

=== Australian Classic Rally Challenge for Co-drivers ===
Points are awarded to the top twenty classified finishers. A bonus point is awarded winner of the most stages during an event. The best three events go towards final championship points.

Position	1st	2nd	3rd	4th	5th	6th	7th	8th	9th	10th	11th	12th	13th	14th	15th	16th	17th	18th	19th	20th
Points	40	34	30	26	22	20	18	16	14	12	10	9	8	7	6	5	4	3	2	1

Pos.	Driver	WA		ACT		QLD			NSW				SA			Total	Best 3
Pos.	Driver	H1	H2	H1	H2	H1	H2	Ove.	H1	H2	H3	Ove.	H1	H2	H3	Total	Best 3
1	New South Wales Coral Taylor	1	1 ^{1}	1	1 ^{1}											162	162
2	Queensland Andrew Dunbar	2	2	4	2											128	128
3	Western Australia Kathy Miles	4	4	7	6											90	90
4	Australian Capital Territory Col Trinder	3	3													60	60
5	South Australia Kate Catford			3	3											60	60
6	Queensland Catriona Kelly			5	4											48	48
7	New Zealand Dave Devonport			6	5											42	42
8	New South Wales Tony Brandon			2	Ret											34	34
	New South Wales Rodney Vanderpool			Ret	DNS											0	0

Key
Colour	Result
Gold	Winner
Silver	2nd place
Bronze	3rd place
Green	Points finish
Blue	Non-points finish
Blue	Non-classified finish (NC)
Purple	Did not finish (Ret)
Black	Excluded (EX)
Black	Disqualified (DSQ)
White	Did not start (DNS)
White	Cancelled (C)
Blank	Withdrew entry from the event (WD)
