= Sepang 1000 km =

- Venue: Sepang International Circuit
- First race: 2009
- Duration: 1000 km
- Most wins (team): Proton R3 (5)
- Most wins (manufacturer): Proton (6)

The Sepang 1000 km Endurance Race is a 1,000-kilometre (620-mile) endurance racing event held annually since 2009 at the Sepang International Circuit in December. The race was created out of the success of the 12-hour Malaysia Merdeka Endurance Race, but unlike the MMER is a touring car race and is limited to cars with an engine capacity of under 1,800 cubic centimetres (110 cubic inches). Originally 1900 cc was the upper limit but this was reduced in 2011. Despite the engine power advantage of the larger-engined cars, Class 2 1,600 cc (98 cu in) cars have won two of three races held thus far.

== Classes ==
The race is divided into 2 classes, for cars of 1800 cc and a second class for cars of 1600 cc or less.

=== Class 1 ===
- FIA Article 254 - Group N Cars 1601cc to 1800cc
- FIA Article 255 - Group A Cars 1601cc to 1800cc
- FIA Article 277 - National Series Production Cars 1601cc to 1800cc
- (2,500 units minimum production)

=== Class 2 ===
- FIA Article 254 - Group N Cars up to 1600cc
- FIA Article 255 - Group A Cars up to 1600cc
- FIA Article 277 - National Series Production Cars up to 1600cc
- (2,500 units minimum production)

== Overall Winners ==
Year	Team	Drivers	Car	Laps
2009	Type R Racing Team	(Malaysia) KK Soh (Malaysia) YC Wong (Malaysia) KK Tek	Honda Integra	182
2010	Ultra Racing-Kegani	(Malaysia) Kenny Lee (Australia) Chris O'Shannessy (Malaysia) Tung Wei Hsiao	Toyota Levin	181
2011	Type R Racing Team	(Malaysia) WS Lai (Malaysia) KK Soh (Malaysia) YC Wong	Toyota Altis	181
2012	Proton R3	(Malaysia) Syafiq Ali (Japan) Morio Nitta	Proton Satria Neo	181
2013	Honda Malaysia Racing Team	(Malaysia) Aaron Lim (Malaysia) Eddie Liew	Honda Jazz	181
2014	Proton R3	(Malaysia) Tengku Djan Ley (Malaysia) Syafiq Ali	Proton Prevé	181
2015	Honda Malaysia Racing Team	(Malaysia) Aaron Lim (Malaysia) Farriz Fauzy	Honda City	181
2016	Mayhem - FX Tune Racing Team	(Malaysia) Tengku Djan Ley (Malaysia) Keifli Othman (Malaysia) Zizan Razak (Malaysia) Faye Kusairi	Proton Suprima S	181
2017	Proton R3	(Malaysia) Admi Shahrul (Malaysia) James Veerapen	Proton Suprima S	181
2018	Proton R3	(Malaysia) Fariqe Hairuman (Malaysia) Syafiq Ali	Proton Iriz	181
2019	Proton R3	(Malaysia) Fariqe Hairuman (Malaysia) Mitchell Cheah	Proton Iriz	181
2020	Race Cancelled			
2021		(Malaysia) Leona Chin (Malaysia) Mohd Nasri Bin Md Said (Malaysia) Tham Yik Choon (Malaysia) Akina Teo (Malaysia) Adrian Chong	Suzuki Swift	178
2022	Toyota Gazoo Racing Malaysia	(Malaysia) Tengku Djan Ley (Malaysia) Naquib Azlan	Toyota Vios	181
2023	Wing Hin Motorsports	(Malaysia) Amer Harris Jefry (Malaysia) Muhammad Nabil Azlan	Toyota Yaris	162

=== Multiple race winners ===
Wins	Driver
2	(Malaysia) YC Wong
2	(Malaysia) Syafiq Ali
2	(Malaysia) Aaron Lim
2	(Malaysia) Tengku Djan Ley
2	(Malaysia) Fariqe Hairuman

Wins	Manufacturer
6	(Malaysia) Proton
3	(Japan) Honda
2	(Japan) Toyota
