= 2013 Australian Rally Championship =

2013 Australian Rally season

Seasons
- ← 2012 2014 →

The 2013 East Coast Bullbars Australian Rally Championship is the 46th season of the Australian Rally Championship, one of the world's oldest continuously run rally championships. The season began 1 March at the newly revived National Capital Rally, and is scheduled to end 16 November at Rally Victoria, after six events.

The championship incorporates two international events, Round 5 is a World Rally Championship event, Rally Australia, while Round 4, the International Rally of Queensland is a round of the Asia-Pacific Rally Championship.

Each domestic rally is contested over two heats, with three or four components to the two international events.

With the championship now awarded specifically to two-wheel-drive cars exclusively has seen an influx of European and Asian Super 2000 and Super 1600 cars as well as a revival of older rear-wheel-drive performance cars. While most of the top drivers have moved out of the Mitsubishi Lancer and Subaru Impreza 4WD turbos, they remain competitive with reigning Western Australian rally champion Alex Stone winning a heat at the Forest Rally.

Between Honda Jazz driver Eli Evans and Renault Clio driver Scott Peddar have dominated the 2013 season, winning all bar one heat and taking eleven of the 18 top three positions. Evans leads the championship by 29 points over Peddar. Peddar's teammate Tom Wilde is 88 points behind Evans in third. Mazda 2 driver Brendan Reeves, who is also racing in the NACAM Rally Championship is fourth a distant 119 points from Peddar. Proving the flexibility of the new regulations, Jack Monkhouse is fifth in the championship driving a 1999 model Nissan Silvia.

== Race calendar and results ==
The 2013 Australian Rally Championship is as follows:

Round	Rally name		Podium finishers				Statistics			
Round	Rally name		Rank	Driver	Car	Time	Stages	Length	Starters	Finishers
1	National Capital Rally	Heat 1 (1–2 March)	1	(Australia) Scott Pedder	Renault Clio R3	47:58.0	6	96.06 km	66	54
1	National Capital Rally	Heat 1 (1–2 March)	2	(Australia) Eli Evans	Honda Jazz	48:06.1	6	96.06 km	66	54
1	National Capital Rally	Heat 1 (1–2 March)	3	(Australia) Tom Wilde	Renault Clio R3	48:48.5	6	96.06 km	66	54
1	National Capital Rally	Heat 2 (3 March)	1	(Australia) Eli Evans	Honda Jazz	58:12.2	7	95.34 km	65	47
1	National Capital Rally	Heat 2 (3 March)	2	(Australia) John Mitchell	Mitsubishi Lancer Evo VII	58:24.7	7	95.34 km	65	47
1	National Capital Rally	Heat 2 (3 March)	3	(Australia) Scott Pedder	Renault Clio R3	58:45.3	7	95.34 km	65	47
2	Quit Forest Rally	Heat 1 (5–6 April)	1	(Australia) Alex Stone	Subaru Impreza WRX STI	1:09:08.3	10	105.89 km	47	35
2	Quit Forest Rally	Heat 1 (5–6 April)	2	(Australia) Eli Evans	Honda Jazz	1:10:47.2	10	105.89 km	47	35
2	Quit Forest Rally	Heat 1 (5–6 April)	3	(Australia) Tom Wilde	Renault Clio R3	1:11:31.9	10	105.89 km	47	35
2	Quit Forest Rally	Heat 2 (7 April)	1	(Australia) Scott Pedder	Renault Clio R3	1:04:42.5	9	104.17 km	41	27
2	Quit Forest Rally	Heat 2 (7 April)	2	(Australia) Eli Evans	Honda Jazz	1:05:01.5	9	104.17 km	41	27
2	Quit Forest Rally	Heat 2 (7 April)	3	(Australia) Leigh Hynes	Subaru Impreza WRX	1:05:18.8	9	104.17 km	41	27
3	Scouts Rally SA	Heat 1 (24–25 May)	1	(Australia) Eli Evans	Honda Jazz	57:53.6	11	117.05 km	51	42
3	Scouts Rally SA	Heat 1 (24–25 May)	2	(Australia) Scott Pedder	Renault Clio R3	58:12.3	11	117.05 km	51	42
3	Scouts Rally SA	Heat 1 (24–25 May)	3	(Australia) Declan Dwyer	Mitsubishi Lancer Evo VI	58:13.3	11	117.05 km	51	42
3	Scouts Rally SA	Heat 2 (26 May)	1	(Australia) Eli Evans	Honda Jazz	50:39.3	7	93.81 km	44	36
3	Scouts Rally SA	Heat 2 (26 May)	2	(Australia) Scott Pedder	Renault Clio R3	50:57.2	7	93.81 km	44	36
3	Scouts Rally SA	Heat 2 (26 May)	3	(Australia) Brendan Reeves	Mazda 2	51:13.4	7	93.81 km	44	36
4	International Rally of Queensland	Heat 1 (12–13 July)	1	(Australia) Eli Evans	Honda Jazz	1:02:30.5	12	111.24 km	74	53
4	International Rally of Queensland	Heat 1 (12–13 July)	2	(Australia) Scott Pedder	Renault Clio R3	1:02:54.8	12	111.24 km	74	53
4	International Rally of Queensland	Heat 1 (12–13 July)	3	(Australia) Tom Wilde	Renault Clio R3	1:03:55.4	12	111.24 km	74	53
4	International Rally of Queensland	Heat 2 (14 July)	1	(Australia) Eli Evans	Honda Jazz	1:05:20.5	9	102.82 km	64	48
4	International Rally of Queensland	Heat 2 (14 July)	2	(Australia) Tom Wilde	Renault Clio R3	1:06:42.2	9	102.82 km	64	48
4	International Rally of Queensland	Heat 2 (14 July)	3	(Australia) Steven Shepheard	Mitsubishi Lancer Evo X	1:07:06.7	9	102.82 km	64	48
4	International Rally of Queensland	Overall (12–14 July)	1	(Australia) Eli Evans	Honda Jazz	2:07:51.0	21	214.06 km	74	48
4	International Rally of Queensland	Overall (12–14 July)	2	(Australia) Tom Wilde	Renault Clio R3	2:10:37.6	21	214.06 km	74	48
4	International Rally of Queensland	Overall (12–14 July)	3	(Australia) John Mitchell	Mitsubishi Lancer Evo VII	2:12:26.0	21	214.06 km	74	48
5	Rally Australia	Heat 1 (12–13 September)	1	(Australia) Eli Evans	Honda Jazz	49:35.6	9	94.54 km	69	64
5	Rally Australia	Heat 1 (12–13 September)	2	(Australia) Brendan Reeves	Mazda 2	50:06.1	9	94.54 km	69	64
5	Rally Australia	Heat 1 (12–13 September)	3	(Australia) Tom Wilde	Renault Clio R3	50:19.8	9	94.54 km	69	64
5	Rally Australia	Heat 2 (14 September)	1	(Australia) Brendan Reeves	Mazda 2	1:25:00.7	6	132.68 km	66	57
5	Rally Australia	Heat 2 (14 September)	2	(Australia) Eli Evans	Honda Jazz	1:25:02.2	6	132.68 km	66	57
5	Rally Australia	Heat 2 (14 September)	3	(Australia) Tom Wilde	Renault Clio R3	1:25:50.4	6	132.68 km	66	57
5	Rally Australia	Heat 3 (15 September)	1	(Australia) Scott Pedder	Renault Clio R3	36:25.0	3	62.57 km	62	47
5	Rally Australia	Heat 3 (15 September)	2	(Australia) Brendan Reeves	Mazda 2	36:34.7	3	62.57 km	62	47
5	Rally Australia	Heat 3 (15 September)	3	(Australia) Eli Evans	Honda Jazz	36:47.6	3	62.57 km	62	47
5	Rally Australia	Overall (12–15 September)	1	(Australia) Eli Evans	Honda Jazz	2:51:25.4	18	289.79 km	69	47
5	Rally Australia	Overall (12–15 September)	2	(Australia) Brendan Reeves	Mazda 2	2:51:41.5	18	289.79 km	69	47
5	Rally Australia	Overall (12–15 September)	3	(Australia) Tom Wilde	Renault Clio R3	2:53:45.2	18	289.79 km	69	47
6	Rally Victoria	Heat 1 (15 November)	1	(Australia) Eli Evans	Honda Jazz	41:13.3	4	55.20 km	37	34
6	Rally Victoria	Heat 1 (15 November)	2	(Australia) Brendan Reeves	Mazda 2	41:16.5	4	55.20 km	37	34
6	Rally Victoria	Heat 1 (15 November)	3	(Australia) Richie Dalton	Mitsubishi Lancer Evo IX	41:17.8	4	55.20 km	37	34
6	Rally Victoria	Heat 2 (16 November)	1	(Australia) Eli Evans	Honda Jazz	1:36:13.3	7	143.20 km	64	56
6	Rally Victoria	Heat 2 (16 November)	2	(Australia) John Mitchell	Mitsubishi Lancer Evo VII	1:36:40.1	7	143.20 km	64	56
6	Rally Victoria	Heat 2 (16 November)	3	(Australia) Richie Dalton	Mitsubishi Lancer Evo IX	1:36:46.0	7	143.20 km	64	56

== Championship standings ==
The 2013 Australian Rally Championship points are as follows:

=== Australian Championship ===
Position	Driver	Vehicle	Capital		Forest		SA		Queensland			Australia				Victoria		Total
Position	Driver	Vehicle	H1	H2	H1	H2	H1	H2	H1	H2	Overall	H1	H2	H3	Overall	H1	H2	Total
1	(Australia) Eli Evans	Honda Jazz	2	1 ^{4}	1	2 ^{5}	1	1 ^{6}	1	1	1 ^{1}	1	2	3	1 ^{6}	1	1 ^{6}	508
2	(Australia) Tom Wilde	Renault Clio R3	3	11	2	3	5	4 ^{1}	3	2	2 ^{5}	3	3	4	3	3	3	326
3	(Australia) Scott Pedder	Renault Clio R3	1	2	3	1 ^{2}	2	2	2	7	5 ^{1}	10	4	1	5 ^{1}	Ret	Ret ^{1}	326
4	(Australia) Brendan Reeves	Mazda 2	Ret	9 ^{5}	4	6 ^{3}	3	3	6	Ret	Ret ^{3}	2	1	2	2	2	2	293
5	(Australia) Mark Pedder	Honda Jazz	6	4	Ret	Ret	6	5	4	3	3	6	5	5	4	4	Ret	230
6	(Australia) Michael Patton	Volkswagen Polo	8	7	7	Ret	Ret	DNS	7	5	6	9	9	8	6	5	5	178
7	(Australia) Adrian Coppin	Ford Fiesta R2	9	8	8	Ret	9	8	8	6	7	11	8	9	7			152
8	(Australia) Nicholas Box	Holden VK Commodore; Nissan 370Z	11	10	Ret	5	14	Ret	5	4	4	8	7	Ret	Ret			125
9	(Australia) Jack Monkhouse	Nissan Silvia	5	3 ^{1}	5	7	11	Ret ^{3}	Ret	Ret	Ret	5	Ret	Ret	Ret ^{3}			122
10	(Australia) Michael Boaden	Volkswagen Polo	Ret	5	6	4	7	6	Ret	DNS	Ret	4	Ret	Ret	Ret			119
11	(Australia) Steven Mackenzie	Ford Fiesta ST	7	6			8	9	Ret	Ret	Ret	Ret	6	6	8	Ret	Ret	106
12	(Australia) Glen Raymond	Mazda RX-7										7	10	7	9	6	4	84
13	(Australia) Will Orders	Nissan Silvia	4	Ret	Ret	Ret	4	Ret										52

Key
Colour	Result
Gold	Winner
Silver	2nd place
Bronze	3rd place
Green	Points finish
Blue	Non-points finish
Blue	Non-classified finish (NC)
Purple	Did not finish (Ret)
Black	Excluded (EX)
Black	Disqualified (DSQ)
White	Did not start (DNS)
White	Cancelled (C)
Blank	Withdrew entry from the event (WD)

=== Four wheel drive class ===
Position	Driver	Vehicle	Capital		Forest		SA		Queensland			Australia				Victoria		Total
Position	Driver	Vehicle	H1	H2	H1	H2	H1	H2	H1	H2	Overall	H1	H2	H3	Overall	H1	H2	Total
1	(Australia) John Mitchell	Mitsubishi Lancer Evo VII	Ret	1 ^{1}					1	1	1 ^{1}	1	1	2	1 ^{1}	2	1	253
2	(Australia) Ritchie Dalton	Subaru Impreza WRX STi; Mitsubishi Lancer Evo IX	1	6					6	2	3	2	3	4	3	1	2 ^{1}	212
3	(Australia) Michael Bailey	Mitsubishi Lancer Evo VI	3	4					3	4	2	5	4	5	4	7	4	183
4	(Australia) Michael Harding	Subaru Impreza WRX STi	2	2			8	2	2	Ret	Ret					4	6	160
5	(Australia) Gerald Schofield	Mitsubishi Lancer Evo IX	4	7					5	6	5	6	6	Ret	Ret	8	5	127
6	(Australia) Warren Lee	Mitsubishi Lancer Evo IX					4	1								6	3	116
7	(Australia) Doug Tostevin	Subaru Impreza WRX STi			3	2										3	Ret	98
8	(Australia) Peter Roberts	Mitsubishi Lancer Evo VII										3	2	1	2			86
9	(Australia) Brett Middleton	Subaru Forester			Ret	Ret	Ret	Ret	4	5	4	4	Ret	7	10			84
10	(Australia) Adrian Di Lallo	Mitsubishi Lancer Evo VI	Ret	Ret	2	4	5	Ret										78
11	(Australia) John O'Dowd	Subaru Impreza WRX STi			1	3												70
11	(Australia) Graeme Miles	Subaru Impreza WRX			4	Ret	9	4										70
13	(Australia) Derek Reynolds	Mitsubishi Lancer Evo VI	Ret	5			7	7										56
14	(Australia) Bethany Cullen	Mitsubishi Lancer Evo VI										9	5	3	5			55
15	(Australia) Justin Dowell	Mitsubishi Lancer Evo IX					2	8										54
16	(Australia) Joshua Doyle	Mitsubishi Lancer Evo VII					6	3										50
17	(Australia) James Rodda	Subaru Impreza WRX STi					3	6										48
18	(Australia) Stephen Mitchell	Subaru Impreza WRX										10	7	9	6			42
19	(Australia) Leigh Hynes	Subaru Impreza WRX			Ret	1 ^{1}												41
19	(Australia) Declan Dwyer	Mitsubishi Lancer Evo VI					1	Ret ^{1}										41
21	(Australia) Stephen Mee	Mazda 323 4WD	6	8														40
22	(Australia) Mark Fawcett	Porsche Cayenne					10	5										38
22	(Australia) Cath Donohue	Mitsubishi Lancer Evo X							7	7	6							38
24	(Australia) Chris Jaques	Mitsubishi Lancer Evo VI										11	8	11	7			36
24	(Australia) Robert Webber	Mitsubishi Lancer Evo IX														5	9	36
26	(Australia) John Keen	Subaru Impreza WRX STi										12	9	10	8			33
27	(Australia) Andrew Penny	Subaru Impreza WRX										7	Ret	8	9			31
28	(Australia) Robert King	Subaru Impreza WRX														9	8	30
28	(Australia) Brad Till	Subaru Impreza WRX														10	7	30
30	(Australia) Gerard McConkey	Subaru Impreza WRX										8	Ret	6	11			28
31	(Australia) Peter Dunn	Subaru Impreza WRX STi										Ret	10	12	12			19
32	(Australia) Marius Swart	Volkswagen Polo S2000							Ret	3	Ret							15
