= Honda Malaysia Racing Team =

Auto racing team from Malaysia

- Founded: 2003
- Base: Alor Gajah, Melaka
- Current series: Sepang 1000 km
- Former series: Merdeka Millennium Endurance; Malaysia Championship Series

Honda Malaysia Racing Team is an auto racing team from Malaysia established in 2003 by Honda Malaysia to compete in Merdeka Millennium Endurance race, and currently competing in the Sepang 1000 km.

Between year 2003 to 2007, the team received technical guidance from Mugen Motorsports and since 2008 the team became an independent Malaysian team with advisers from Japan.

The team has won Merdeka Millennium Endurance Class A five consecutive times: 2003 to 2007, it also won the race overall in 2004.

== Merdeka Millennium Endurance result ==
Year	Car	No	Drivers	Class	Laps	Class Pos.	Pos.
2003	Honda Integra Type R	26	(Japan) Kunimitsu Takahashi (Japan) Hidetoshi Mitsusada (Japan) Hiroki Katoh	A	261	1st	3rd
2003	Honda Integra Type R	28	(Hong Kong) Lo Ka Chun (Hong Kong) Lo Ka Fai (Malaysia) Ng Kok Chin	A	254	3rd	6th
2004	Honda Civic	26	(Japan) Kunimitsu Takahashi (Japan) Hidetoshi Mitsusada (Malaysia) Tommy Lee	A	260	3rd	3rd
2004	Honda Civic	27	(Malaysia) Eddie Liew (Malaysia) Farriz Fauzy (Japan) Hiroki Katoh	A	265	1st	1st
2005	Honda Civic	26	(Japan) Kunimitsu Takahashi (Japan) Ryo Michigami (Malaysia) Tommy Lee	A	253	4th	8th
2005	Honda Civic	27	(Malaysia) Eddie Liew (Malaysia) Farriz Fauzy (Japan) Hiroki Katoh	A	278	1st	2nd
2006	Honda Civic	26	(Japan) Kunimitsu Takahashi (Japan) Shinya Hosokawa (Malaysia) Rueben Wong	A	209	8th	41st
2006	Honda Civic	27	(Malaysia) Eddie Liew (Malaysia) Farriz Fauzy (Japan) Hiroki Katoh	A	258	1st	4th
2007	Honda Civic Type R	26	(Malaysia) Aaron Lim (Malaysia) Rueben Wong (Malaysia) Fahrizal Hasan	A	282	2nd	3rd
2007	Honda Civic Type R	27	(Malaysia) Eddie Liew (Japan) Hiroki Katoh (Japan) Shinya Hosokawa	A	283	1st	2nd
2008	Honda Civic Type R	26	(Malaysia) Rueben Wong (Malaysia) Fahrizal Hasan (Malaysia) Faisal Asri	A	252	9th	23rd
2008	Honda Civic Type R	27	(Malaysia) Eddie Liew (Malaysia) Aaron Lim (Malaysia) Victor Cheong	A	267	6th	18th
2009	Honda Civic Type R	27	(Malaysia) Eddie Liew (Malaysia) Aaron Lim (Malaysia) Rueben Wong	A2	278	2nd	8th
2010	Honda Civic Type R	27	(Malaysia) Eddie Liew (Malaysia) Aaron Lim (Malaysia) Rueben Wong	TP	281	1st	8th

== Sepang 1000 km result ==
Year	Car	Drivers	Laps	Pos.
2012	Honda Jazz	(Malaysia) Tengku Ezan Ley (Malaysia) Farriz Fauzy	177	5th
2012	Honda Jazz	(Malaysia) Aaron Lim (Malaysia) Eddie Liew	140	20th
2013	Honda Jazz	(Malaysia) Aaron Lim (Malaysia) Eddie Liew	181	1st
2013	Honda Jazz	(Malaysia) Tengku Ezan Ley (Malaysia) Farriz Fauzy	167	9th
2014	Honda Jazz	(Malaysia) Aaron Lim (Malaysia) Eddie Liew	180	3rd
2014	Honda City	(Malaysia) Farriz Fauzy (Malaysia) Alif Hamdan	177	4th
2014	Honda Jazz	(Malaysia) Jeff Tan Zhong Zheng (Malaysia) Mohd Henzee Hamzah	172	6th
2015	Honda City	(Malaysia) Aaron Lim (Malaysia) Farriz Fauzy	181	1st
2016	Honda Jazz	(Malaysia) Aaron Lim (Malaysia) Farriz Fauzy	180	2nd
2017	Honda Jazz	(Malaysia) Aaron Lim (Malaysia) Farriz Fauzy	142	DNF
2017	Honda City	(Malaysia) Mark Darwin (Malaysia) Ahmad Akid Noor	127	26th
