= Andrea Caldarelli =

Italian racing driver (born 1990)

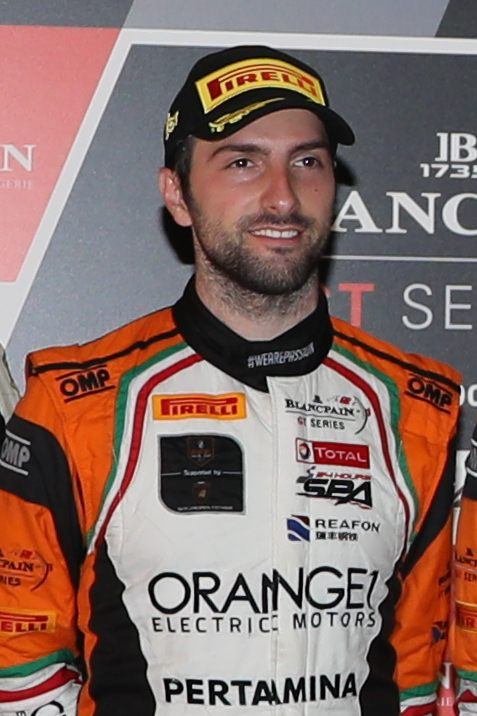
- Caldarelli in 2019
- Nationality: (Italy) Italian
- Born: 14 February 1990 (age 36) Pescara, Italy
- Relatives: Vitaliano Caldarelli (father); Vitantonio Liuzzi (brother-in-law)

Super GT career
- Debut season: 2012 (GT500)
- Current team: Lexus Team LeMans WAKO'S
- Categorisation: FIA Silver (until 2014); FIA Gold (2015–2020); FIA Platinum (2021–)
- Car number: 6
- Former teams: Lexus Team KeePer TOM'S, Lexus Team Kraft
- Starts: 47
- Wins: 3
- Poles: 2
- Fastest laps: 1
- Best finish: 3rd in 2014

Previous series
- 2011, 2013 2011 2011: Formula Nippon; GP3 Series; GP2 Asia

Championship titles
- 2017, 2019 2019 2021-2022 2024: Blancpain GT Series Endurance Cup; Blancpain GT World Challenge Europe; GT World Challenge America - Pro; European Le Mans Series - LMGT3

Andrea Caldarelli (born 14 February 1990) is an Italian racing driver and team owner who competes in the IMSA SportsCar Championship in GTD Pro for Pfaff Motorsports.

A Lamborghini factory driver since 2017, Caldarelli is a four-time GT World Challenge champion across Europe and America, and raced in LMDh in 2024. He previously drove in Super Formula and Super GT as a Toyota/Lexus works driver. Caldarelli undertook a Formula One test in 2008 with Toyota Racing and in 2010 with Ferrari. He co-founded the FFF Racing Team in 2014.

== Career ==
=== Super GT ===
Caldarelli claimed his maiden victory in Super GT in 2014. Driving alongside Daisuke Itō for Lexus Team KeePer TOM'S, Caldarelli claimed victory in the opening race of the season at Okayama. The duo would finish the season second in the GT500-class championship to Tsugio Matsuda and Ronnie Quintarelli.

=== Lamborghini factory driver ===
Ahead of the 2017 Blancpain GT Series campaign, Caldarelli joined Lamborghini Squadra Corse's factory roster, taking part in the Blancpain GT Series Endurance Cup campaign with GRT Grasser Racing Team. Partnering with Christian Engelhart and Mirko Bortolotti, the trio claimed the series championship at season's end. Two years later, Caldarelli swept all three of the championships under the GT World Challenge Europe umbrella; the Endurance Cup, Sprint Cup, and combined championship at large.

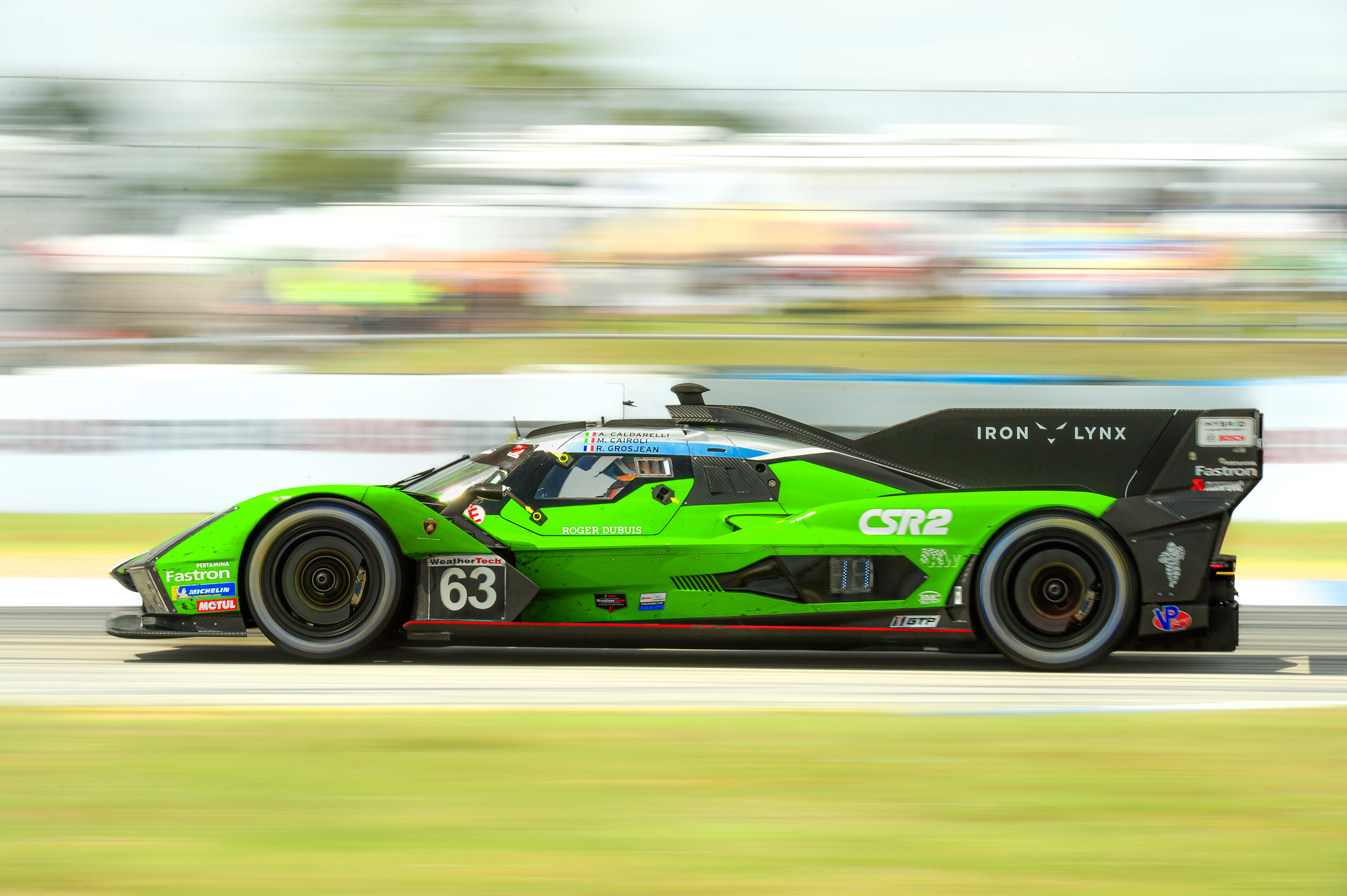
The No. 63 Lamborghini SC63 that belongs to Caldarelli, Romain Grosjean, and Matteo Cairoli at the 2024 12 Hours of Sebring

For the 2021 season, Caldarelli began competing in the United States, taking part in K-Pax Racing's return to the GT World Challenge America. Paired with Jordan Pepper, Caldarelli would claim nine overall victories in 13 races, taking the series championship two races early. He returned to the team the following year, successfully defending his title during the 2022 season. In 2023, Caldarelli returned to the GT World Challenge Europe Endurance Cup, taking part with Iron Lynx alongside co-drivers Bortolotti and Pepper.

In July 2022, Caldarelli was named as one of the first drivers slated to compete in Lamborghini's LMDh entry, which debuted in 2024.

== Racing record ==
=== Racing career summary ===
Season	Series	Team	Races	Wins	Poles	F/Laps	Podiums	Points	Position
2005	Formula Azzura	Scuderia Pescara Corse	12	1	1	0	4	51	4th
2005	Formula Gloria Italy	N/A	4	0	0	0	0	16	17th
2005	Formula Renault 2.0 Italia Winter Series	RP Motorsport	4	0	0	0	0	0	NC
2006	Formula Renault 2.0 Italia	CO2 Motorsport	15	0	1	0	1	38	14th
2006	Eurocup Formula Renault 2.0	CO2 Motorsport	2	0	0	0	0	0	NC†
2006	Asian Formula Renault Challenge	M3-Prema Formula Racing Team	2	1	1	2	2	0	NC†
2007	Eurocup Formula Renault 2.0	Prema Powerteam	14	0	0	0	0	2	24th
2007	Formula Renault 2.0 Italia	Prema Powerteam	14	0	0	0	2	150	12th
2008	Eurocup Formula Renault 2.0	SG Formula	14	0	0	0	10	123	**3rd**
2008	Formula Renault 2.0 WEC	SG Formula	15	3	0	1	9	129	**3rd**
2008	Formula One	Panasonic Toyota Racing	Test driver						
2009	Formula 3 Euro Series	SG Formula	20	0	0	1	1	11	14th
2009	Masters of Formula 3	SG Formula	1	0	0	0	0	N/A	23rd
2010	Italian Formula Three Championship	Prema Junior	16	3	2	3	5	148	**3rd**
2011	Formula Nippon	Kondō Racing	7	0	0	0	0	0	16th
2011	Formula Nippon - Fuji Sprint Cup	Kondō Racing	1	0	0	0	0	N/A	9th
2011	GP3 Series	Tech 1 Racing	4	0	0	2	1	20	10th
2011	GP2 Asia Series	Ocean Racing Technology	4	0	0	0	0	0	21st
2012	Super GT Series - GT500	Lexus Team KeePer Kraft	8	0	0	0	1	28	13th
2012	JAF Grand Prix - Super GT	Lexus Team KeePer Kraft	1	0	0	0	0	1	13th
2013	Super GT Series - GT500	Lexus Team KeePer TOM'S	8	0	0	0	2	47	8th
2013	Super GT - GT500 - Fuji Sprint Cup	Lexus Team KeePer TOM'S	1	0	0	0	0	N/A	NC
2013	Super Formula	Kygnus Sunoco Team LeMans	3	0	0	0	0	4	13th
2014	Super GT Series - GT500	Lexus Team KeePer TOM'S	8	1	0	0	3	79	**2nd**
2014	Super Formula	Kygnus Sunoco Team LeMans	1	0	1	0	0	7	12th
2014	Super Formula	Petronas Team TOM'S	1	0	0	0	1	7	12th
2014	GT Asia Series - GT3	NB Team	2	0	1	0	0	8	52nd
2015	Super GT Series - GT500	Lexus Team KeePer TOM'S	8	2	0	0	2	56	5th
2015	Super Formula	Lenovo Team Impul	8	0	1	0	0	4	14th
2015	GT Asia Series - GT3	FFF Racing Team by ACM	7	0	0	2	0	17	32nd
2015	Sepang 12 Hours - GT3	FFF Racing Team by ACM	1	0	0	0	0	N/A	4th
2016	Super GT Series - GT500	Lexus Team LeMans WAKO'S	8	0	1	0	2	69	**2nd**
2016	International GT Open - GT3 Pro-Am	FFF Racing Team	2	0	0	0	0	6	22nd
2016	International GT Open - GT3 Pro-Am	SF Racing	4	0	1	1	1	6	22nd
2016	GT3 Le Mans Cup	FFF Racing Team by ACM	1	0	0	0	0	0	NC
2016	24H Series - A6	GRT Grasser Racing Team	1	0	0	0	1	0	NC†
2016–17	Asian Le Mans Series - GT	FFF Racing by ACM	2	0	0	0	0	0.5	21st
2017	Super GT Series - GT500	Lexus Team LeMans Wako's	8	0	0	0	4	63	**3rd**
2017	Blancpain GT Series Endurance Cup	GRT Grasser Racing Team	5	2	0	0	3	86	**1st**
2017	Blancpain GT Series Sprint Cup	GRT Grasser Racing Team	2	0	0	0	2	21	12th
2017	Intercontinental GT Challenge	GRT Grasser Racing Team	1	0	0	0	0	0	NC
2017	International GT Open - GT3 Pro-Am	SF Racing	5	1	2	2	1	10	15th
2017	IMSA SportsCar Championship - GTD	Paul Miller Racing	1	0	0	0	0	24	61st
2018	ADAC GT Masters	Orange1 by GRT Grasser	14	1	0	0	3	64	7th
2018	Blancpain GT Series Endurance Cup	GRT Grasser Racing Team	5	0	0	0	0	13	31st
2018	Blancpain GT Series Sprint Cup	GRT Grasser Racing Team	10	0	0	0	2	37	9th
2018	IMSA SportsCar Championship - GTD	Paul Miller Racing	1	0	0	0	1	30	50th
2018	Super GT Series - GT300	JLOC	1	0	0	0	0	5	18th
2018	Suzuka 10 Hours - Pro	JLOC	1	0	0	0	0	N/A	13th
2018	Audi R8 LMS Cup - Invitational Race	FFF Racing Team	1	0	0	0	1	N/A	**3rd**
2019	Blancpain GT Series Endurance Cup	Orange1 FFF Racing Team	5	1	0	0	3	74	**1st**
2019	Blancpain GT World Challenge Europe	Orange1 FFF Racing Team	10	2	0	2	6	92.5	**1st**
2019	Intercontinental GT Challenge	Orange1 FFF Racing Team	1	0	0	0	0	0	NC
2019	Intercontinental GT Challenge	JLOC	1	0	0	0	0	0	NC
2019	IMSA SportsCar Championship - GTD	Paul Miller Racing	1	0	0	0	0	16	63rd
2020	GT World Challenge Europe Endurance Cup	Orange1 FFF Racing Team	4	0	0	0	1	37	9th
2020	Intercontinental GT Challenge	Orange1 FFF Racing Team	2	0	0	0	0	0	NC
2020	IMSA SportsCar Championship - GTD	Paul Miller Racing	1	1	0	0	1	35	39th
2020	British GT Championship - GT3 Pro-Am	WPI Motorsport	5	1	0	0	2	80.5	8th
2020	Nürburgring Endurance Series - VT2	Pixum CFN Team Adrenalin Motorsport	1	0	0	0	0	7.81	45th
2020	Nürburgring Endurance Series - SP9 Pro	FFF Racing Group	1	0	0	0	0	3.54	80th
2020	Michelin Le Mans Cup - GT3	Orange1 FFF Racing Team	2	2	1	1	2	0	NC†
2021	GT World Challenge America - Pro	K-PAX Racing	12	8	5	5	11	270	**1st**
2021	GT World Challenge Europe Endurance Cup	Orange 1 FFF Racing Team	5	1	4	0	2	73	4th
2021	IMSA SportsCar Championship - GTD	Paul Miller Racing	1	0	0	0	1	314	45th
2021	Intercontinental GT Challenge	Orange 1 FFF Racing Team	1	0	0	0	0	23	11th
2021	Intercontinental GT Challenge	K-PAX Racing	1	0	0	0	1	23	11th
2022	GT World Challenge America - Pro	K-PAX Racing	13	8	0	5	11	263	**1st**
2022	IMSA SportsCar Championship - GTD Pro	TR3 Racing	2	0	1	0	1	577	17th
2022	GT World Challenge Europe Endurance Cup	Orange 1 K-PAX Racing	1	0	0	0	0	0	NC
2022	Intercontinental GT Challenge	Orange 1 K-PAX Racing	1	0	0	0	0	6	19th
2022	Intercontinental GT Challenge	K-PAX Racing	1	0	0	0	0	6	19th
2023	FIA World Endurance Championship - LMP2	Prema Racing	4	0	0	0	0	24	17th
2023	GT World Challenge Europe Endurance Cup	Iron Lynx	5	0	0	0	1	15	14th
2023	IMSA SportsCar Championship - GTD Pro	Iron Lynx	2	0	0	0	0	558	18th
2023	GT World Challenge Europe Sprint Cup	VSR	4	0	0	0	0	9.5	14th
2023	Deutsche Tourenwagen Masters	GRT Grasser Racing Team	2	0	0	0	0	0	31st
2024	IMSA SportsCar Championship - GTP	Lamborghini-Iron Lynx	4	0	0	1	0	986	16th
2024	FIA World Endurance Championship - Hypercar	Lamborghini-Iron Lynx	1	0	0	0	0	0	34th
2024	24 Hours of Le Mans - Hypercar	Lamborghini-Iron Lynx	1	0	0	0	0	N/A	13th
2024	European Le Mans Series - LMGT3	Iron Lynx	6	1	1	0	4	76	**1st**
2024	IMSA SportsCar Championship - GTD Pro	Iron Lynx	1	0	0	0	0	268	36th
2024	GT World Challenge Europe Endurance Cup	Iron Lynx	4	0	1	0	1	27	10th
2025	IMSA SportsCar Championship - GTD Pro	Pfaff Motorsports	10	0	1	2	1	2580	9th
2026	IMSA SportsCar Championship - GTD Pro	Pfaff Motorsports	10	2	1	1	4	2979	**2nd**
2026	IMSA SportsCar Championship - GTD	Pfaff Motorsports	1	0	0	0	0	193	74th

^{†} As Caldarelli was a guest driver, he was ineligible to score points.

=== Complete GP2 Series results ===
==== Complete GP2 Asia Series results ====
(key) (Races in bold indicate pole position) (Races in italics indicate fastest lap)

Year	Entrant	1	2	3	4	DC	Points
2011	Ocean Racing Technology	YMC; FEA; 16	YMC; SPR; 11	IMO; FEA; 18	IMO; SPR; 12	21st	0

=== Complete Eurocup Formula Renault 2.0 results ===
(key) (Races in bold indicate pole position; races in italics indicate fastest lap)

Year	Entrant	1	2	3	4	5	6	7	8	9	10	11	12	13	14	DC	Points
2006	CO2 Motorsport	ZOL; 1	ZOL; 2	IST; 1	IST; 2	MIS; 1; 23	MIS; 2 Ret	NÜR; 1	NÜR; 2	DON; 1	DON; 2	LMS; 1	LMS; 2	CAT; 1	CAT; 2	NC†	0
2007	Prema Powerteam	ZOL; 1; 28†	ZOL; 2; 14	NÜR; 1 Ret	NÜR; 2; 21	HUN; 1; 9	HUN; 2; 33	DON; 1 Ret	DON; 2; 20	MAG; 1; 29	MAG; 2; 15	EST; 1; 27	EST; 2; 23	CAT; 1; 23	CAT; 2; 24	24th	2
2008	SG Formula	SPA; 1; 2	SPA; 2 Ret	SIL; 1; 2	SIL; 2; 3	HUN; 1; 2	HUN; 2; 2	NÜR; 1; 5	NÜR; 2; 3	LMS; 1; 2	LMS; 2; 2	EST; 1; 8	EST; 2; 12	CAT; 1; 3	CAT; 2; 2	3rd	123

† As Caldarelli was a guest driver, he was ineligible for points

=== Complete GP3 Series results ===
(key) (Races in bold indicate pole position) (Races in italics indicate fastest lap)

Year	Entrant	1	2	3	4	5	6	7	8	9	10	11	12	13	14	15	16	DC	Points
2011	Tech 1 Racing	IST; FEA; 2	IST; SPR; 5	CAT; FEA; 4	CAT; SPR; 4	VAL; FEA	VAL; SPR	SIL; FEA	SIL; SPR	NÜR; FEA	NÜR; SPR	HUN; FEA	HUN; SPR	SPA; FEA	SPA; SPR	MNZ; FEA	MNZ; SPR	10th	20

=== Complete Formula Nippon/Super Formula Results ===
(Races in bold indicate pole position)

Year	Team	Engine	1	2	3	4	5	6	7	8	9	DC	Points
2011	Kondō Racing	Toyota	SUZ; Ret	AUT; Ret	FUJ; 13	MOT; 13	SUZ; C	SUG; 9	MOT; Ret	MOT; Ret		16th	0
2013	Kygnus Sunoco Team LeMans	Toyota	SUZ; 7	AUT	FUJ	MOT	SUG	SUZ; Ret	SUZ; 5			13th	4
2014	Kygnus Sunoco Team LeMans	Toyota	SUZ	FUJ	FUJ	**FUJ**; Ret						12th	7
2014	Petronas Team TOM'S	Toyota					MOT; 3	AUT	SUG	SUZ	SUZ	12th	7
2015	Lenovo Team Impul	Toyota	SUZ; 11	OKA; 6	**FUJ**; 9	MOT; 11	AUT; 15	SUG; 16	SUZ; Ret	SUZ; 12		14th	4

=== Complete Super GT results ===
Year	Team	Car	Class	1	2	3	4	5	6	7	8	DC	Points
2012	Lexus Team Kraft	Lexus SC430	GT500	OKA; Ret	FUJ; 12	SEP; 10	SUG; 6	SUZ; 2	FUJ; 7	AUT; 13	MOT; Ret	13th	28
2013	Lexus Team TOM'S	Lexus SC430	GT500	OKA; 15	FUJ; 6	SEP; 10	SUG; 2	SUZ; 5	FUJ; 3	AUT; 9	MOT; 6	8th	47
2014	Lexus Team TOM'S	Lexus RC F	GT500	OKA; 1	FUJ; 5	AUT; 4	SUG; 2	FUJ; 9	SUZ; 7	BUR; 4	MOT; 2	2nd	79
2015	Lexus Team KeePer TOM'S	Lexus RC F	GT500	**OKA**; 1	FUJ; 6	CHA; 6	FUJ; 12	SUZ; 8	SUG; 9	AUT; 12	**MOT**; 1	5th	56
2016	Lexus Team LeMans WAKO's	Lexus RC F	GT500	OKA; 4	FUJ; 5	SUG; 4	FUJ; 9	SUZ; 4	CHA; 3	MOT; 4	MOT; 2	2nd	69
2017	Lexus Team LeMans WAKO's	Lexus LC500	GT500	OKA; 2	FUJ; 2	AUT; 13	SUG; 3	FUJ; 9	SUZ; 7	CHA; 2	MOT; 13	3rd	63
2018	JLOC	Lamborghini Huracán GT3	GT300	OKA	FUJ	SUZ	CHA; 6	FUJ	SUG	AUT	MOT	18th	5

=== Complete GT World Challenge Europe results ===
==== GT World Challenge Europe Endurance Cup ====
Year	Team	Car	Class	1	2	3	4	5	6	7	Pos.	Points
2017	GRT Grasser Racing Team	Lamborghini Huracán GT3	Pro	MNZ; 1	SIL; 1	LEC; 13	SPA; 6H; 2	SPA; 12H; 1	SPA; 24H; Ret	CAT; 3	1st	86
2018	GRT Grasser Racing Team	Lamborghini Huracán GT3	Pro	MNZ; 4	SIL; 10	LEC; 13	SPA; 6H; 55	SPA; 12H; 59	SPA; 24H; Ret	CAT; 13	31st	13
2019	Orange 1 FFF Racing Team	Lamborghini Huracán GT3 Evo	Pro	MNZ; 2	SIL; 6	LEC; 3	SPA; 6H; 33	SPA; 12H; 21	SPA; 24H; 8	CAT; 1	1st	74
2020	Orange 1 FFF Racing Team	Lamborghini Huracán GT3 Evo	Pro	IMO; Ret	NÜR; 16	SPA; 6H; 2	SPA; 12H; 2	SPA; 24H; 38	LEC; 3		9th	37
2021	Orange 1 FFF Racing Team	Lamborghini Huracán GT3 Evo	Pro	**MNZ**; 24	**LEC**; 3	SPA; 6H; 2	SPA; 12H; 10	SPA; 24H; 8	**NÜR**; 1	**CAT**; 4	4th	73
2022	Orange 1 K-PAX Racing	Lamborghini Huracán GT3 Evo	Pro	IMO	LEC	SPA; 6H; 31	SPA; 12H; 22	SPA; 24H; 11	HOC	CAT	NC	0
2023	Iron Lynx	Lamborghini Huracán GT3 Evo 2	Pro	MNZ; 3	LEC; 39†	SPA; 6H; 61	SPA; 12H; Ret	SPA; 24H; Ret	NÜR; Ret	CAT; 20	14th	15
2024	Iron Lynx	Lamborghini Huracán GT3 Evo 2	Pro	**LEC**; 2	SPA; 6H; 57†	SPA; 12H; Ret	SPA; 24H; Ret	NÜR; 9	MNZ	JED; 7	10th	27

==== GT World Challenge Europe Sprint Cup ====
Year	Team	Car	Class	1	2	3	4	5	6	7	8	9	10	Pos.	Points	Ref
2017	GRT Grasser Racing Team	Lamborghini Huracán GT3	Pro	MIS; QR	MIS; CR	BRH; QR	BRH; CR	ZOL; QR	ZOL; CR	HUN; QR	HUN; CR	NÜR; QR; 2	NÜR; CR; 3	13th	21	
2018	GRT Grasser Racing Team	Lamborghini Huracán GT3	Pro	ZOL; 1; 6	ZOL; 2; 3	BRH; 1; 12	BRH; 2 Ret	MIS; 1; 4	MIS; 2; 20	HUN; 1; 16	HUN; 2; 11	NÜR; 1; 3	NÜR; 2; 5	9th	37	
2019	Orange1 FFF Racing Team	Lamborghini Huracán GT3 Evo	Pro	BRH; 1 Ret	BRH; 2; 2	MIS; 1; 1	MIS; 2; 2	ZAN; 1; 3	ZAN; 2; 7	NÜR; 1; 1	NÜR; 2; 3	HUN; 1; 5	HUN; 2; 4	1st	92.5	
2023	VSR	Lamborghini Huracán GT3 Evo 2	Pro	BRH; 1	BRH; 2	MIS; 1	MIS; 2	HOC; 1	HOC; 2	VAL; 1; 15	VAL; 2; 12	ZAN; 1; 8	ZAN; 2; 4	14th	9.5	

=== Complete IMSA SportsCar Championship results ===
(key) (Races in bold indicate pole position; races in italics indicate fastest lap)

Year	Entrant	Class	Make	Engine	1	2	3	4	5	6	7	8	9	10	11	12	Rank	Points	Ref
2017	Paul Miller Racing	GTD	Lamborghini Huracán GT3	Lamborghini 5.2 L V10	DAY; 7	SEB	LBH	COA	DET	WGL	MOS	LIM	ELK	VIR	LGA	PET	61st	24	
2018	Paul Miller Racing	GTD	Lamborghini Huracán GT3	Lamborghini 5.2 L V10	DAY; 3	SEB	MDO	DET	WGL	MOS	LIM	ELK	VIR	LGA	PET		50th	30	
2019	Paul Miller Racing	GTD	Lamborghini Huracán GT3 Evo	Lamborghini 5.2 L V10	DAY; 15	SEB	MDO	DET	WGL	MOS	LIM	ELK	VIR	LGA	PET		63rd	16	
2020	Paul Miller Racing	GTD	Lamborghini Huracán GT3 Evo	Lamborghini 5.2 L V10	DAY; 1	DAY	SEB	ELK	VIR	ATL	MDO	CLT	PET	LGA	SEB		39th	35	
2021	Paul Miller Racing	GTD	Lamborghini Huracán GT3 Evo	Lamborghini 5.2 L V10	DAY; 3	SEB	MDO	DET	WGL	WGL	LIM	ELK	LGA	LBH	VIR	PET	45th	314	
2022	TR3 Racing	GTD Pro	Lamborghini Huracán GT3 Evo	Lamborghini 5.2 L V10	**DAY**; 12	SEB; 2	LBH	LGA	WGL	MOS	LIM	ELK	VIR	PET			17th	577	
2023	Iron Lynx	GTD Pro	Lamborghini Huracán GT3 Evo 2	Lamborghini 5.2 L V10	DAY; 4	SEB	LBH	LGA	WGL; 9	MOS	LIM	ELK	VIR	IMS	PET		18th	558	
2024	Iron Lynx	GTD Pro	Lamborghini Huracán GT3 Evo 2	Lamborghini 5.2 L V10	DAY; 12						MOS		VIR				36th	213	
2024	Lamborghini – Iron Lynx	GTP	Lamborghini SC63	Lamborghini 3.8 L twin-turbo V8		SEB; 7	LBH	LGA	DET	WGL; 11		ELK		IMS; 8	PET; 8		16th	986	
2025	Pfaff Motorsports	GTD Pro	Lamborghini Huracán GT3 Evo 2	Lamborghini DGF 5.2 L V10	DAY; 13	SEB; 10	LGA; 4	DET; 3	**WGL**; 9	MOS; 5	ELK; 6	VIR; 9	IMS; 9	PET; 10			9th	2580	
2026	Pfaff Motorsports	GTD Pro	Lamborghini Huracán GT3 Evo 2	Lamborghini DGF 5.2 L V10	DAY; 6												2nd	2979	
2026	Pfaff Motorsports	GTD Pro	Lamborghini Temerario GT3	Lamborghini L411 4.0 L Turbo V8		SEB; 10		LGA; 5	DET; 2	WGL; 9	MOS; 8	ELK; 1	**VIR**; 1	IMS; 3	PET; 4		2nd	2979	
2026	Pfaff Motorsports	GTD	Lamborghini Temerario GT3	Lamborghini L411 4.0 L Turbo V8			LBH; 14										74th	193	

=== Complete British GT Championship results ===
(key) (Races in bold indicate pole position in class) (Races in italics indicate fastest lap in class)

Year	Team	Car	Class	1	2	3	4	5	6	7	8	9	DC	Points
2020	WPI Motorsport	Lamborghini Huracán GT3	GT3	OUL; 1	OUL; 2	DON; 1; 1	DON; 2; 7	BRH; 1	DON; 1	SNE; 1; 6	SNE; 2; 2	SIL; 1; 6	8th	84.5

=== Complete FIA World Endurance Championship results ===
(key) (Races in bold indicate pole position) (Races in italics indicate fastest lap)

Year	Entrant	Class	Chassis	Engine	1	2	3	4	5	6	7	8	Rank	Points
2023	Prema Racing	LMP2	Oreca 07	Gibson GK428 4.2 L V8	SEB; 7	ALG	SPA; 4	LMS	MNZ; 9	FUJ; 10	BHR		17th	24
2024	Lamborghini Iron Lynx	Hypercar	Lamborghini SC63	Lamborghini 3.8 L Turbo V8	QAT	IMO	SPA; Ret	LMS	SAP	COA	FUJ	BHR	34th	0

=== Complete Deutsche Tourenwagen Masters results ===
(key) (Races in bold indicate pole position) (Races in italics indicate fastest lap)

Year	Entrant	Chassis	1	2	3	4	5	6	7	8	9	10	11	12	13	14	15	16	Rank	Points
2023	GRT Grasser Racing Team	Lamborghini Huracán GT3 Evo 2	OSC; 1	OSC; 2	ZAN; 1	ZAN; 2	NOR; 1	NOR; 2	NÜR; 1	NÜR; 2	LAU; 1	LAU; 2	SAC; 1	SAC; 2	RBR; 1; 17	RBR; 2 DSQ	HOC; 1	HOC; 2	31st	0

=== Complete European Le Mans Series results ===
(key) (Races in bold indicate pole position; results in italics indicate fastest lap)

Year	Entrant	Class	Chassis	Engine	1	2	3	4	5	6	Rank	Points
2024	Iron Lynx	LMGT3	Lamborghini Huracán GT3 Evo 2	Lamborghini DGF 5.2 L V10	CAT; 3	LEC; 2	IMO; 3	**SPA**; Ret	MUG; 9	ALG; 1	1st	76

=== Complete 24 Hours of Le Mans results ===
Year	Team	Co-Drivers	Car	Class	Laps	Pos.	Class Pos.
2024	(Italy) Lamborghini Iron Lynx	(Italy) Matteo Cairoli (France) Romain Grosjean	Lamborghini SC63	Hypercar	309	13th	13th

Sporting positions
Preceded by Rob Bell; Côme Ledogar; Shane van Gisbergen	Blancpain GT Series Endurance Cup; Champion; 2017; With: Mirko Bortolotti & Christian Engelhart	Succeeded by Yelmer Buurman; Maro Engel; Luca Stolz
Preceded by Raffaele Marciello; Michael Meadows (GT Series Sprint Cup)	Blancpain GT World Challenge Europe; Champion; 2019; With: Marco Mapelli	Succeeded by Dries Vanthoor; Charles Weerts (GT World Challenge Europe Sprint Cup)
Preceded by Yelmer Buurman; Maro Engel; Luca Stolz	Blancpain GT Series Endurance Cup; Champion; 2019; With: Marco Mapelli	Succeeded by Alessandro Pier Guidi (GT World Challenge Europe Endurance Cup)
Preceded by Raffaele Marciello	Blancpain GT Series; Champion; 2019; With: Marco Mapelli	Succeeded by Timur Boguslavskiy (GT World Challenge Europe)
Preceded by Alessio Picariello; Zacharie Robichon; Ryan Hardwick (LMGTE)	European Le Mans Series; LMGT3 Champion; 2024; With: Axcil Jefferies & Hiroshi Hamaguchi	Succeeded by Rui Andrade; Charlie Eastwood; Hiroshi Koizumi
