= 2014 Australian Rally Championship =

2014 Australian Rally season

Seasons
- ← 2013 2015 →

The 2014 East Coast Bullbars Australian Rally Championship was the 47th season of the Australian Rally Championship, one of the world's oldest continuously run rally championships. The season began 28 February at the National Capital Rally, and ended 15 November at Rally Victoria, after six events. The championship incorporated two international events; Round 5 was a World Rally Championship event, Rally Australia, while Round 3, the International Rally of Queensland was a round of the Asia-Pacific Rally Championship. Each domestic rally was contested over two heats, with three or four components to the two international events.

The championship was won for the first time by Scott Pedder, taking a total of eight heat wins and the overall wins for the two international events. He won the title by 44 points ahead of Brendan Reeves, who took 5 heat wins during the season. Third place in the championship was taken by Adrian Coppin, who took podium placings in eight heats without victory. The only other driver to take a heat win was Steven Mackenzie, who won the final heat of the season, at Rally Victoria.

== Event calendar and results ==
The 2014 Australian Rally Championship was as follows:

Round	Rally name		Podium finishers				Statistics			
Round	Rally name		Rank	Driver	Car	Time	Stages	Length	Starters	Finishers
1	National Capital Rally	Heat 1 (28 February–1 March)	1	(Australia) Brendan Reeves	Mazda 2	1:20:23.0	8	108.22 km	56	44
1	National Capital Rally	Heat 1 (28 February–1 March)	2	(Australia) Scott Pedder	Renault Clio R3	1:20:51.5	8	108.22 km	56	44
1	National Capital Rally	Heat 1 (28 February–1 March)	3	(Australia) Neal Bates	Toyota Celica	1:21:25.7	8	108.22 km	56	44
1	National Capital Rally	Heat 2 (2 March)	1	(Australia) Brendan Reeves	Mazda 2	50:03.8	7	81.94 km	56	41
1	National Capital Rally	Heat 2 (2 March)	2	(Australia) Scott Pedder	Renault Clio R3	50:09.2	7	81.94 km	56	41
1	National Capital Rally	Heat 2 (2 March)	3	(Australia) Richie Dalton	Mitsubishi Lancer Evo IX	50:57.2	7	81.94 km	56	41
2	Quit Forest Rally	Heat 1 (4–5 April)	1	(Australia) Scott Pedder	Renault Clio R3	1:08:06.6	10	104.43 km	74	57
2	Quit Forest Rally	Heat 1 (4–5 April)	2	(Australia) Dylan King	Subaru Impreza WRX	1:08:13.3	10	104.43 km	74	57
2	Quit Forest Rally	Heat 1 (4–5 April)	3	(Australia) Brendan Reeves	Mazda 2	1:08:39.4	10	104.43 km	74	57
2	Quit Forest Rally	Heat 2 (6 April)	1	(Australia) Dylan King	Subaru Impreza WRX	1:09:01.9	8	111.76 km	53	44
2	Quit Forest Rally	Heat 2 (6 April)	2	(Australia) Brendan Reeves	Mazda 2	1:10:03.3	8	111.76 km	53	44
2	Quit Forest Rally	Heat 2 (6 April)	3	(Australia) Doug Tostevin	Subaru Impreza WRX STI	1:10:15.3	8	111.76 km	53	44
3	International Rally of Queensland	Heat 1 (20–21 June)	1	(Australia) Scott Pedder	Renault Clio R3	1:14:06.7	10	118.60 km	47	33
3	International Rally of Queensland	Heat 1 (20–21 June)	2	(Australia) Brendan Reeves	Mazda 2	1:15:08.9	10	118.60 km	47	33
3	International Rally of Queensland	Heat 1 (20–21 June)	3	(Australia) Matt van Tuinen	Subaru Impreza WRX STi	1:15:51.7	10	118.60 km	47	33
3	International Rally of Queensland	Heat 2 (22 June)	1	(Australia) Scott Pedder	Renault Clio R3	1:07:11.7	5	103.70 km	43	26
3	International Rally of Queensland	Heat 2 (22 June)	2	(Australia) Brendan Reeves	Mazda 2	1:08:12.2	5	103.70 km	43	26
3	International Rally of Queensland	Heat 2 (22 June)	3	(Australia) Peter Roberts	Mitsubishi Lancer Evo VI	1:08:43.3	5	103.70 km	43	26
3	International Rally of Queensland	Overall (20–22 June)	1	(Australia) Scott Pedder	Renault Clio R3	2:21:18.4	15	222.30 km	41	21
3	International Rally of Queensland	Overall (20–22 June)	2	(Australia) Brendan Reeves	Mazda 2	2:23:21.1	15	222.30 km	41	21
3	International Rally of Queensland	Overall (20–22 June)	3	(Australia) Peter Roberts	Mitsubishi Lancer Evo VI	2:26:30.2	15	222.30 km	41	21
4	Scouts Rally SA	Heat 1 (1 August)	1	(Australia) Scott Pedder	Renault Clio R3	16:36.5	3	26.53 km	21	17
4	Scouts Rally SA	Heat 1 (1 August)	2	(Australia) Henry Nott	Mitsubishi Lancer Evo VI	16:37.5	3	26.53 km	21	17
4	Scouts Rally SA	Heat 1 (1 August)	3	(Australia) Brendan Reeves	Mazda 2	16:49.0	3	26.53 km	21	17
4	Scouts Rally SA	Heat 2 (2 August)	1	(Australia) Scott Pedder	Renault Clio R3	48:34.8	9	85.44 km	40	24
4	Scouts Rally SA	Heat 2 (2 August)	2	(Australia) Brendan Reeves	Mazda 2	49:22.0	9	85.44 km	40	24
4	Scouts Rally SA	Heat 2 (2 August)	3	(Australia) Adrian Coppin	Citroën DS3 R3T	50:56.8	9	85.44 km	40	24
4	Scouts Rally SA	Heat 3 (3 August)	1	(Australia) Scott Pedder	Renault Clio R3	32:20.9	7	54.38 km	35	32
4	Scouts Rally SA	Heat 3 (3 August)	2	(Australia) Henry Nott	Mitsubishi Lancer Evo VI	32:42.5	7	54.38 km	35	32
4	Scouts Rally SA	Heat 3 (3 August)	3	(Australia) Neal Bates	Toyota Celica	33:12.0	7	54.38 km	35	32
5	Rally Australia	Heat 1 (11–12 September)	1	(Australia) Scott Pedder	Renault Clio R3	1:05:56.6	8	95.84 km	44	39
5	Rally Australia	Heat 1 (11–12 September)	2	(Australia) Michael Boaden	Volkswagen Polo Vivo	1:08:32.7	8	95.84 km	44	39
5	Rally Australia	Heat 1 (11–12 September)	3	(Australia) Mick Patton	Volkswagen Polo Vivo	1:10:49.7	8	95.84 km	44	39
5	Rally Australia	Heat 2 (13 September)	1	(Australia) Brendan Reeves	Mazda 2	1:13:52.6	6	116.80 km	40	36
5	Rally Australia	Heat 2 (13 September)	2	(Australia) Adrian Coppin	Citroën DS3 R3T	1:16:43.7	6	116.80 km	40	36
5	Rally Australia	Heat 2 (13 September)	3	(Australia) Michael Boaden	Volkswagen Polo Vivo	1:16:45.9	6	116.80 km	40	36
5	Rally Australia	Heat 3 (14 September)	1	(Australia) Brendan Reeves	Mazda 2	48:32.3	5	78.74 km	37	30
5	Rally Australia	Heat 3 (14 September)	2	(Australia) Adrian Coppin	Citroën DS3 R3T	50:08.5	5	78.74 km	37	30
5	Rally Australia	Heat 3 (14 September)	3	(Australia) Scott Pedder	Renault Clio R3	50:27.6	5	78.74 km	37	30
5	Rally Australia	Overall (11–14 September)	1	(Australia) Scott Pedder	Renault Clio R3	3:13:57.1	19	291.38 km	44	30
5	Rally Australia	Overall (11–14 September)	2	(Australia) Mick Patton	Volkswagen Polo Vivo	3:23:41.5	19	291.38 km	44	30
5	Rally Australia	Overall (11–14 September)	3	(Australia) Adrian Coppin	Citroën DS3 R3T	3:29:57.4	19	291.38 km	44	30
6	Rally Victoria	Heat 1 (14 November)	1	(Australia) Scott Pedder	Renault Clio R3	42:58.2	4	63.30 km	35	29
6	Rally Victoria	Heat 1 (14 November)	2	(Australia) Richie Dalton	Mitsubishi Lancer Evo IX	43:05.9	4	63.30 km	35	29
6	Rally Victoria	Heat 1 (14 November)	3	(Australia) Brendan Reeves	Mazda 2	43:12.7	4	63.30 km	35	29
6	Rally Victoria	Heat 2 (15 November)	1	(Australia) Justin Dowel	Mitsubishi Lancer Evo X	1:31:44.6	9	136.36 km	56	47
6	Rally Victoria	Heat 2 (15 November)	2	(Australia) Henry Nott	Mitsubishi Lancer Evo VI	1:32:04.5	9	136.36 km	56	47
6	Rally Victoria	Heat 2 (15 November)	3	(Australia) Steven Mackenzie	Ford Fiesta ST	1:33:19.0	9	136.36 km	56	47

== Championship standings ==
The 2014 Australian Rally Championship points were as follows:

=== Australian Championship ===
Position	Driver	Vehicle	Capital		Forest		Queensland			SA			Australia				Victoria		Total
Position	Driver	Vehicle	H1	H2	H1	H2	H1	H2	Ove.	H1	H2	H3	H1	H2	H3	Ove.	H1	H2	Total
1	(Australia) Scott Pedder	Renault Clio R3	4	2 ^{1}	1	5 ^{6}	1	1	1 ^{6}	1	1	1 ^{6}	1	4	3	1 ^{1}	1	2	483
2	(Australia) Brendan Reeves	Mazda 2	1	1 ^{6}	2	1 ^{3}	2	2	2	2	2	5 ^{3}	Ret	1	1	5 ^{5}	2	5 ^{6}	439
3	(Australia) Adrian Coppin	Citroën DS3 R3T	3	3	3	3	5	6	5 ^{1}	3	3	6 ^{1}	5	2	2	3 ^{1}	4	4	361
4	(Australia) Tony Sullens	Citroën DS3 R3T	5	Ret	4	2	3	3	3	4	4	4	4	6	5	4 ^{3}	3	3 ^{1}	333
5	(Australia) Alan Roe	Ford Focus	Ret	4	5	4 ^{1}				6	Ret	3					5	6	152
6	(Australia) Michael Patton	Volkswagen Polo Vivo	6	5	Ret	Ret	Ret	5	Ret				3	5	6	2			123
7	(Australia) Steven Mackenzie	Ford Fiesta	2	6									EX	Ret	4	EX	Ret	1	117
8	(Australia) Michael Boaden	Volkswagen Polo Vivo	Ret	Ret			4	4	4 ^{3}	5	Ret	2	2	3	Ret	Ret			115
9	(Australia) Eli Evans	Volkswagen Polo Vivo	Ret	Ret ^{3}													Ret	Ret ^{3}	6

Key
Colour	Result
Gold	Winner
Silver	2nd place
Bronze	3rd place
Green	Points finish
Blue	Non-points finish
Blue	Non-classified finish (NC)
Purple	Did not finish (Ret)
Black	Excluded (EX)
Black	Disqualified (DSQ)
White	Did not start (DNS)
White	Cancelled (C)
Blank	Withdrew entry from the event (WD)
