= Genji Hashimoto =

Japanese racing driver

- Born: 7 October 1965 (age 61); Aichi, Japan
- Occupations: CEO of Amprex International; Racing Driver

Merdeka Millennium Endurance Race
- Years active: 2005
- Teams: Proton R3 Amprex

Previous series
- 2003-2005 1989: Super GT; Japanese Formula Three

Championship titles
- 2005: Merdeka Millennium Endurance Race Champion

Genji Hashimoto (橋本元次, Hashimoto Genji; born 7 October 1965) is a Japanese businessman and racing driver. He is the CEO of Amprex International.

== Business ==
Hashimoto is the CEO of Amprex International, a multi discipline business with registered offices in Malaysia, Singapore, Australia and Hong Kong. Amprex operate in a number of different areas including motoring, telecommunications and information technology. Amprex was the name used for Hashimoto's motor racing teams.

As of 2022, Hashimoto's business is the exclusive distributor for Rotax Karts in Malaysia. As part of the partnership, they will be used in his Morac Adventure Park facility in Langkawi.

== Motor Racing ==
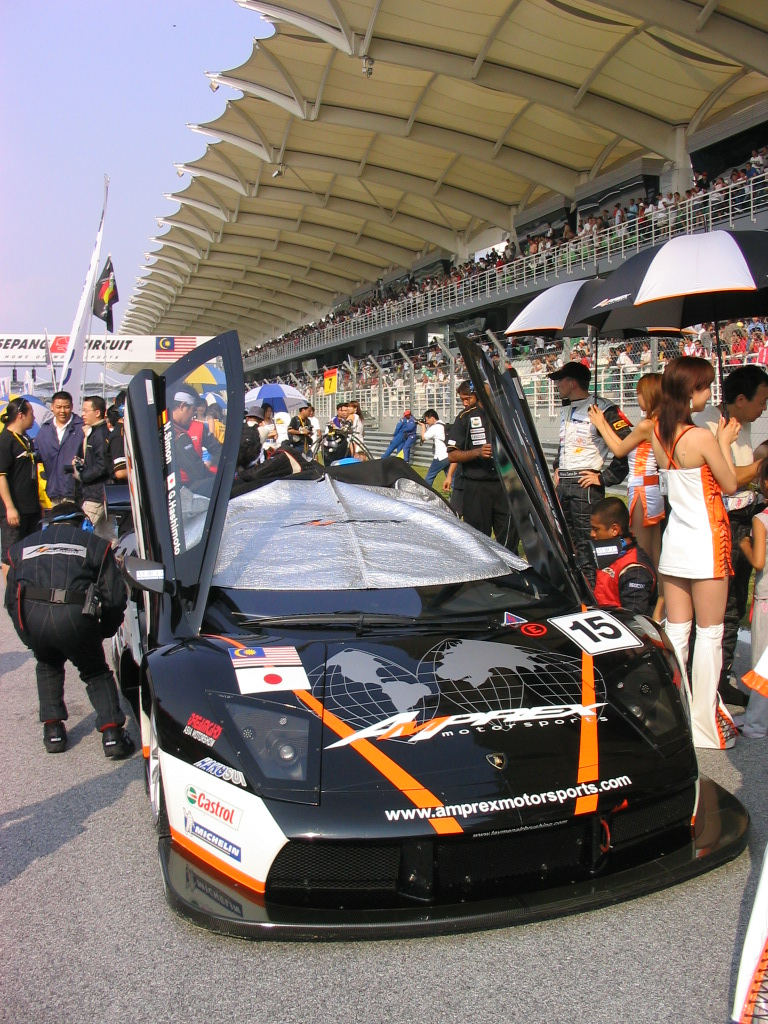
Hashimoto's Amprex Lamborghini Murcielago R-GT

Hashimoto began racing in 1989, completing four races of the Japanese Formula Three season with Zoom Racing. He would not competitively race again until 2002, with his own Amprex Motorsport team. In Super GT, he competed eight races with a BMW M3 GTR in the GT300 class, securing two points and 28th place in the championship. He continued to race the BMW in 2003, but secured no points across the eight races. In 2004, Amprex Motorsports entered the Super GT championship in the GT500 class with a Lamborghini Murcielago R-GT. However, they completed just two races and scored no points. In 2005, Hashimoto confirmed the Lamborghini was for sale.

Between 2002 and 2005, Hashimoto competed in the Merdeka Millennium Endurance Race. Initially with a Super GT specification Mazda RX-7 which broke down, and later in 2003 using the BMW M3 GTR from the GT300 class. In 2004, his team were leading the race but retired with mechanical issues from their Lamborghini. However, in 2005 whilst racing for team Proton R3 Amprex driving a Lotus Exige 300RR, He won both their class and the race outright.
