= 2015 Sepang 12 Hours =

16th edition of motor race

Race details
Date	12 December 2015
Location	Sepang, Malaysia
Course	5.543 km (3.444 mi)
Weather	Qualifying: Sunny; Race: Changeable
- Race

Pole
Driver	(Italy) Gianmaria Bruni	Clearwater Racing
Time	2:02.768

Podium
First	(United Kingdom) Stuart Leonard (Monaco) Stéphane Ortelli (Belgium) Laurens Vanthoor	Belgian Audi Club Team WRT
Second	(Germany) Christopher Haase (Belgium) Enzo Ide (Germany) Christopher Mies	Belgian Audi Club Team WRT
Third	(Austria) Nikolaus Mayr-Melnhof (Denmark) Nicki Thiim (Germany) Markus Winkelhock	Phoenix Racing

The 2015 Sepang 12 Hours was the 16th Sepang 12 Hours race held on Sepang International Circuit on 12 December 2015. The race was contested with GT3-spec cars, GTC-spec cars, GT4-spec cars and touring cars. This was the first Sepang 12 Hours race organized by the Stéphane Ratel Organisation (SRO).

== Report ==
=== Qualifying ===
Pole position was taken by car #1, Clearwater Racing, with a time of 2:02.768.

== Event format ==
Day	Session	Time/distance
Thursday (10 December)	Paid Practice (GT3/GTC)	120 minutes
Thursday (10 December)	Paid Practice (GT4/Touring Cars)	120 minutes
Thursday (10 December)	Free Practice 1	120 minutes
Thursday (10 December)	Free Practice 2	120 minutes
Friday (11 December)	Free Practice 3	90 minutes
Friday (11 December)	Qualifying	90 minutes
Friday (11 December)	Qualifying Shootout	15 minutes
Saturday (12 December)	Race	12 hours

== Entry list ==
Team	Car	No.	Drivers	Class	
Team	Car	No.	Drivers	Driver	Car
(Singapore) Clearwater Racing	Ferrari 458 Italia GT3	1	(Italy) Gianmaria Bruni	P	GT3
(Singapore) Clearwater Racing	Ferrari 458 Italia GT3	1	(United Kingdom) James Calado	P	GT3
(Singapore) Clearwater Racing	Ferrari 458 Italia GT3	1	(Republic of Ireland) Matt Griffin	P	GT3
(Singapore) Clearwater Racing	Ferrari 458 Italia GT3	1	(Singapore) Weng Sun Mok	P	GT3
(New Zealand) Team NZ PTE LTD	Porsche 997 GT3 Cup	7	(New Zealand) Will Bamber	PA	GTC
(New Zealand) Team NZ PTE LTD	Porsche 997 GT3 Cup	7	(New Zealand) John Curran	PA	GTC
(New Zealand) Team NZ PTE LTD	Porsche 997 GT3 Cup	7	(New Zealand) Graeme Dowsett	PA	GTC
(New Zealand) Team NZ PTE LTD	Porsche 997 GT3 Cup	7	(Malaysia) Alif Hamdan	PA	GTC
(United Kingdom) Bentley Team M-Sport	Bentley Continental GT3	8	(Germany) Maximilian Buhk	P	GT3
(United Kingdom) Bentley Team M-Sport	Bentley Continental GT3	8	(Spain) Andy Soucek	P	GT3
(United Kingdom) Bentley Team M-Sport	Bentley Continental GT3	8	(Belgium) Maxime Soulet	P	GT3
(United Kingdom) Bentley Team M-Sport	Bentley Continental GT3	9	(France) Vincent Abril	P	GT3
(United Kingdom) Bentley Team M-Sport	Bentley Continental GT3	9	(United Kingdom) Steven Kane	P	GT3
(United Kingdom) Bentley Team M-Sport	Bentley Continental GT3	9	(United Kingdom) Guy Smith	P	GT3
(Thailand) Singha Motorsport	Ferrari 458 Italia GT3	11	(Thailand) Piti Bhirombhakdi	PA	GT3
(Thailand) Singha Motorsport	Ferrari 458 Italia GT3	11	(Netherlands) Carlo van Dam	PA	GT3
(Thailand) Singha Motorsport	Ferrari 458 Italia GT3	11	(Italy) Alessandro Pier Guidi	PA	GT3
(Thailand) Singha Motorsport	Ferrari 458 Italia GT3	11	(Italy) Davide Rizzo	PA	GT3
(Japan) GTO Racing Team	Toyota GT86	14	(Hong Kong) Cheng Long Chan	PA	TC
(Japan) GTO Racing Team	Toyota GT86	14	(Hong Kong) Brian Lee Ching Hsin	PA	TC
(Japan) GTO Racing Team	Toyota GT86	14	(Japan) Hideto Yasuoka	PA	TC
(Japan) GTO Racing Team	Toyota GT86	14	(Taiwan) Shing Hung Wei	PA	TC
(Germany) Phoenix Racing (Note: Entered as Audi Hong Kong powered by Phoenix Racing Asia with car No. 15.)	Audi R8 LMS	15	(Hong Kong) Marchy Lee	P	GT3
(Germany) Phoenix Racing	Audi R8 LMS	15	(Hong Kong) Shaun Thong	P	GT3
(Germany) Phoenix Racing	Audi R8 LMS	15	(Malaysia) Alex Yoong	P	GT3
(Germany) Phoenix Racing	Audi R8 LMS	16	(Austria) Nikolaus Mayr-Melnhof	P	GT3
(Germany) Phoenix Racing	Audi R8 LMS	16	(Denmark) Nicki Thiim	P	GT3
(Germany) Phoenix Racing	Audi R8 LMS	16	(Germany) Markus Winkelhock	P	GT3
(Belgium) Belgian Audi Club Team WRT	Audi R8 LMS	17	(United Kingdom) Stuart Leonard	P	GT3
(Belgium) Belgian Audi Club Team WRT	Audi R8 LMS	17	(Monaco) Stéphane Ortelli	P	GT3
(Belgium) Belgian Audi Club Team WRT	Audi R8 LMS	17	(Belgium) Laurens Vanthoor	P	GT3
(Belgium) Belgian Audi Club Team WRT	Audi R8 LMS	150	(Germany) Christopher Haase	P	GT3
(Belgium) Belgian Audi Club Team WRT	Audi R8 LMS	150	(Belgium) Enzo Ide	P	GT3
(Belgium) Belgian Audi Club Team WRT	Audi R8 LMS	150	(Germany) Christopher Mies	P	GT3
(Taiwan) Top Speed Racing	Lamborghini Huracán Super Trofeo	23	(New Zealand) James Munro	PA	GTC
(Taiwan) Top Speed Racing	Lamborghini Huracán Super Trofeo	23	(Estonia) Martin Rump	PA	GTC
(Taiwan) Top Speed Racing	Lamborghini Huracán Super Trofeo	23	(Malaysia) Afiq Yazid	PA	GTC
(Taiwan) Top Speed Racing	Lamborghini Huracán Super Trofeo	23	(China) Yuan Bo	PA	GTC
(Thailand) B-Quik Racing	Audi R8 LMS Cup	26	(Australia) Daniel Bilski	PA	GTC
(Thailand) B-Quik Racing	Audi R8 LMS Cup	26	(Netherlands) Henk Kiks	PA	GTC
(Thailand) B-Quik Racing	Audi R8 LMS Cup	26	(Netherlands) Peter Kox	PA	GTC
(Malaysia) Naza Nexus	Ferrari 458 Italia GT3	27	(Malaysia) Dominic Ang	PA	GT3
(Malaysia) Naza Nexus	Ferrari 458 Italia GT3	27	(Malaysia) Adrian D'Silva	PA	GT3
(Malaysia) Naza Nexus	Ferrari 458 Italia GT3	27	(Australia) Joshua Lee Hunt	PA	GT3
(Malaysia) CPK Racing	Porsche 991 GT3 Cup	33	(Malaysia) Mark Darwin	PA	GTC
(Malaysia) CPK Racing	Porsche 991 GT3 Cup	33	(Malaysia) Yeh Siang Lim	PA	GTC
(Malaysia) CPK Racing	Porsche 991 GT3 Cup	33	(Australia) John Martin	PA	GTC
(Malaysia) CPK Racing	Porsche 991 GT3 Cup	33	(Malaysia) William Wang Wooi Meng	PA	GTC
(Taiwan) Team AAI-HubAuto	Mercedes-Benz SLS AMG GT3	35	(Taiwan) Han-Chen Chen	PA	GT3
(Taiwan) Team AAI-HubAuto	Mercedes-Benz SLS AMG GT3	35	(Japan) Tatsuya Tanigawa	PA	GT3
(Taiwan) Team AAI-HubAuto	Mercedes-Benz SLS AMG GT3	35	(Japan) Nobuteru Taniguchi	PA	GT3
(Taiwan) Team AAI-HubAuto	Mercedes-Benz SLS AMG GT3	35	(Japan) Hiroki Yoshimoto	PA	GT3
(France) Sport Garage	Ferrari 458 Italia GT3	42	(France) Romain Brandela	Am	GT3
(France) Sport Garage	Ferrari 458 Italia GT3	42	(France) Jean-Paul Buffin	Am	GT3
(France) Sport Garage	Ferrari 458 Italia GT3	42	(France) Georges Cabanne	Am	GT3
(France) Sport Garage	Ferrari 458 Italia GT3	42	(Singapore) Gerald Tan	Am	GT3
(Australia) AMAC Motorsport	Porsche 997 GT3-R	51	(Australia) Warren Luff	PA	GT3
(Australia) AMAC Motorsport	Porsche 997 GT3-R	51	(Australia) Andrew Macpherson	PA	GT3
(Australia) AMAC Motorsport	Porsche 997 GT3-R	51	(United Kingdom) James Winslow	PA	GT3
(China) FFF Racing Team by ACM	McLaren 650S GT3	55	(Italy) Andrea Caldarelli	PA	GT3
(China) FFF Racing Team by ACM	McLaren 650S GT3	55	(Japan) Hiroshi Hamaguchi	PA	GT3
(China) FFF Racing Team by ACM	McLaren 650S GT3	55	(Portugal) Álvaro Parente	PA	GT3
(China) FFF Racing Team by ACM	McLaren 650S GT3	55	(United Kingdom) Andrew Watson	PA	GT3
(Italy) 67Motorsport GDL Racing	Porsche 997 GT3 Cup S	67	(Singapore) Liam Lim Keong	PA	GTC
(Italy) 67Motorsport GDL Racing	Porsche 997 GT3 Cup S	67	(Singapore) Bruce Lee	PA	GTC
(Italy) 67Motorsport GDL Racing	Porsche 997 GT3 Cup S	67	(Singapore) Andrew Tang	PA	GTC
(Italy) 67Motorsport GDL Racing	Porsche 991 GT3 Cup	87	(Malaysia) Gilbert Ang	PA	GTC
(Italy) 67Motorsport GDL Racing	Porsche 991 GT3 Cup	87	(Singapore) Wee Lim Keong	PA	GTC
(Italy) 67Motorsport GDL Racing	Porsche 991 GT3 Cup	87	(Malaysia) Melvin Moh	PA	GTC
(Malaysia) Team Fydis Aylezo	Lamborghini Huracán Super Trofeo	69	(Australia) Mitchell Gilbert	PA	GTC
(Malaysia) Team Fydis Aylezo	Lamborghini Huracán Super Trofeo	69	(Malaysia) Zen Low	PA	GTC
(Malaysia) Team Fydis Aylezo	Lamborghini Huracán Super Trofeo	69	(South Africa) Matthew Swanepoel	PA	GTC
(Malaysia) Team Proton Lotus	Lotus Exige V6 GT4	80	(Hong Kong) Anthony Chan	–	Inv
(Malaysia) Team Proton Lotus	Lotus Exige V6 GT4	80	(Malaysia) Chye Ao Hsiang	–	Inv
(Malaysia) Team Proton Lotus	Lotus Exige V6 GT4	80	(Australia) Robert Webb	–	Inv
(Malaysia) Team Proton Lotus	Lotus Exige V6 GT4	80	(Hong Kong) Eric Wong	–	Inv
(Malaysia) Wing Hin Motorsports	Toyota GT86	86	(Malaysia) Wong Yew Choong	PA	TC
(Malaysia) Wing Hin Motorsports	Toyota GT86	86	(Malaysia) William Ho	PA	TC
(Malaysia) Wing Hin Motorsports	Toyota GT86	86	(Malaysia) Kenny Lee	PA	TC
(Australia) Jim Hunter Motorsport	Subaru Impreza STi 2.0	602	(Australia) Jim Hunter	PA	TC
(Australia) Jim Hunter Motorsport	Subaru Impreza STi 2.0	602	(Australia) Grant Johnson	PA	TC
(Australia) Jim Hunter Motorsport	Subaru Impreza STi 2.0	602	(Malaysia) Douglas Khoo	PA	TC
(Australia) Jim Hunter Motorsport	Subaru Impreza STi 2.0	602	(Australia) Allan Letcher	PA	TC

Icon	Class
Drivers
P	Pro
PA	Pro-Am
Am	Am
Car
GT3	GT3 Class
GTC	Cup Class
TC	Touring Car Class
Inv	Invitation Class

== Race result ==
Class winners in bold.

Pos.	Class	No.	Drivers	Team	Manufacturer	Laps	Time/Retired
1	**GT3 Pro**	**17**	(United Kingdom) **Stuart Leonard** (Monaco) **Stéphane Ortelli** (Belgium) **Laurens Vanthoor**	(Belgium) **Belgian Audi Club Team WRT**	**Audi**	**228**	
2	GT3 Pro	150	(Germany) Christopher Haase (Belgium) Enzo Ide (Germany) Christopher Mies	(Belgium) Belgian Audi Club Team WRT	Audi	228	+8.330
3	GT3 Pro	16	(Austria) Nikolaus Mayr-Melnhof (Denmark) Nicki Thiim (Germany) Markus Winkelhock	(Germany) Phoenix Racing	Audi	228	+1:00.400
4	**GT3 Pro-Am**	**55**	(Italy) **Andrea Caldarelli** (Japan) **Hiroshi Hamaguchi** (Portugal) **Álvaro Parente** (United Kingdom) **Andrew Watson**	(China) **FFF Racing Team by ACM**	**McLaren**	**227**	**+1 Lap**
5	GT3 Pro	8	(Germany) Maximilian Buhk (Spain) Andy Soucek (Belgium) Maxime Soulet	(United Kingdom) Bentley Team M-Sport	Bentley	226	+2 Laps
6	GT3 Pro	15	(Hong Kong) Marchy Lee (Hong Kong) Shaun Thong (Malaysia) Alex Yoong	Audi Hong Kong powered by Phoenix Racing Asia	Audi	225	+3 Laps
7	GT3 Pro-Am	35	(Taiwan) Han-Chen Chen (Japan) Tatsuya Tanigawa (Japan) Nobuteru Taniguchi (Japan) Hiroki Yoshimoto	(Taiwan) Team AAI-HubAuto	Mercedes-Benz	224	+4 Laps
8	GT3 Pro-Am	11	(Thailand) Piti Bhirombhakdi (Netherlands) Carlo van Dam (Italy) Alessandro Pier Guidi (Italy) Davide Rizzo	(Thailand) Singha Motorsport	Ferrari	223	+5 Laps
9	GT3 Pro-Am	27	(Malaysia) Dominic Ang (Malaysia) Adrian D'Silva (Australia) Joshua Lee Hunt	(Malaysia) Naza Nexus	Ferrari	220	+8 Laps
10	GT3 Pro	9	(France) Vincent Abril (United Kingdom) Steven Kane (United Kingdom) Guy Smith	(United Kingdom) Bentley Team M-Sport	Bentley	218	+10 Laps
11	**GTC Pro-Am**	**23**	(New Zealand) **James Munro** (Estonia) **Martin Rump** (Malaysia) **Afiq Yazid** (China) **Yuan Bo**	(Taiwan) **Top Speed Racing**	**Lamborghini**	**211**	**+17 Laps**
12	GTC Pro-Am	7	(New Zealand) Will Bamber (New Zealand) John Curran (New Zealand) Graeme Dowswett (Malaysia) Alif Hamdan	(New Zealand) Team NZ PTE LTD	Porsche	206	+22 Laps
13	GTC Pro-Am	26	(Australia) Daniel Bilski (Netherlands) Henk Kiks (Netherlands) Peter Kox	(Thailand) B-Quik Racing	Audi	206	+22 Laps
14	GTC Pro-Am	67	(Singapore) Liam Lim Keong (Singapore) Bruce Lee (Singapore) Andrew Tang	(Italy) 67Motorsport GDL Racing	Porsche	205	+23 Laps
15	GT3 Pro-Am	51	(Australia) Warren Luff (Australia) Andrew Macpherson (United Kingdom) James Winslow	(Australia) AMAC Motorsport	Porsche	204	+24 Laps
16	GTC Pro-Am	87	(Malaysia) Gilbert Ang (Singapore) Wee Lim Keong (Malaysia) Melvin Moh	(Italy) 67Motorsport GDL Racing	Porsche	195	+33 Laps
17	**TC Pro-Am**	**86**	(Malaysia) **Wong Yew Choong** (Malaysia) **William Ho** (Malaysia) **Kenny Lee**	(Malaysia) **Wing Hin Motorsports**	**Toyota**	**189**	**+39 Laps**
18	GTC Pro-Am	69	(Australia) Mitchell Gilbert (Malaysia) Zen Low (South Africa) Matthew Swanepoel	(Malaysia) Team Fydis Aylezo	Lamborghini	187	+41 Laps
19	**GT3 Am**	**42**	(France) **Romain Brandela** (France) **Jean-Paul Buffin** (France) **Georges Cabanne** (Singapore) **Gerald Tan**	(France) **Sport Garage**	**Ferrari**	**186**	**+42 Laps**
20	GTC Pro-Am	33	(Malaysia) Mark Darwin (Malaysia) Yeh Siang Lim (Australia) John Martin (Malaysia) William Wang Wooi Meng	(Malaysia) CPK Racing	Porsche	174	+54 Laps
21	TC Pro-Am	14	(Hong Kong) Cheng Long Chan (Hong Kong) Brian Lee Ching Hsin (Japan) Hideto Yasuoka (Taiwan) Shing Hung Wei	(Japan) GTO Racing Team	Toyota	167	+61 Laps
22	TC Pro-Am	602	(Australia) Jim Hunter (Australia) Grant Johnson (Malaysia) Douglas Khoo (Australia) Allan Letcher	(Australia) Jim Hunter Motorsport	Subaru	149	+79 Laps
Ret	GT3 Pro	1	(Italy) Gianmaria Bruni (United Kingdom) James Calado (Republic of Ireland) Matt Griffin (Singapore) Weng Sun Mok	(Singapore) Clearwater Racing	Ferrari	77	Accident Damage
Ret	**Inv**	**80**	(Hong Kong) **Anthony Chan** (Malaysia) **Chye Ao Hsiang** (Australia) **Robert Webb** (Hong Kong) **Eric Wong**	(Malaysia) **Team Proton Lotus**	**Lotus**	**7**	**Accident Damage**

== See also ==
- Sepang 12 Hours
- Sepang International Circuit
