= Sepang 12 Hours =

- Venue: Sepang International Circuit
- First race: 2000
- Duration: 12 Hours
- Most wins (manufacturer): Porsche (5)

The Sepang 12 Hours (formerly known as the Malaysia Merdeka Endurance Race and Merdeka Millennium Endurance Race), is a 12-hour endurance racing event held annually at the Sepang International Circuit in Malaysia. The event was held annually from 2000 to 2016 and was revived in 2022. Since 2023, the race has been held annually by Top Speed.

The race was part of the inaugural Intercontinental GT Challenge in 2016.

== Schedule ==
Historically part of the Merdeka holiday, the race was moved to December by Ratel to make the race as the first of four major endurance races held in the Northern Hemisphere winter, the traditional off-season of motorsport, with the others the Dubai 24 Hour (Creventic 24H Series) and the Rolex 24 at Daytona (IMSA WeatherTech SportsCar Championship in January, and the Liqui-Moly Bathurst 12 Hour in February are the others.

== History ==
=== 1990–2000 ===
In the late 1990s, Malaysian auto manufacturer Proton used to organize a 300 km race at Shah Alam circuit for local racers racing with Protons, to celebrate Merdeka in Malaysia. When Sepang International Circuit was built the race was shifted to the F1 circuit, with the winners of the race entitled to a new Proton road car.

But after the 1999 race, a dispute happened between Proton and Sepang International Circuit, resulting in Proton's sponsorship withdrawal. Sepang therefore decided to host a replacement race by itself and started the Merdeka Millennium 12 Hours Endurance Race in 2000. The race also opened up for non-Proton entries.

The inaugural race was won by the Proton EON Racing Team (PERT) with Jimmy Low, Karamjit Singh and Tommy Lee driving, beating off the challenge from TVR Racing who ran Malaysian F1 driver Alex Yoong.

=== 2001–2017 ===
2006 Merdeka Millennium Endurance Race logo

In 2001, TVR Racing won the race with Jeffery Wong, Tommy Lee and Admi Shahrul in a TVR Chimaera.

In 2002, Amprex Motorsport entered the Japan GT300 spec Mazda RX-7 machine, with crack Hong Kong driver Charles Kwan and Kevin Wong as its drivers. But the car failed to finish the race. Nigel Albon, Tommy Lee and T. Hamman won in their Porsche 911 GT3.

In 2003, the race got more serious with BSA Racing entering a Radical SR3 and a Porsche 911 GT3 Cup with Wolf Henzler as its lead driver, while Amprex Motorsport entered the BMW M3 GT for Charles Kwan, Matthew Marsh and Genji Hashimoto. Alex Yoong was also back with Jaseri Racing. But in the end unfancied G1-Meritus won the race after outlasting its rivals, with Eric Yeo, Firhat Mohkzani and Chin Tzer-Jinn driving their Porsche 911 GT3 Cup car serenely to victory after completing 268 laps.

In 2004, Amprex Motorsport, armed with the latest ACO/FIA GT1 spec Lamborghini Murcielago R-GT racer, totally dominated proceedings as its drivers set laps of 2:09s around the circuit. But the car broke down and Honda Malaysia Racing Team, with Eddie Lew, Farriz Fauzy and Super GT driver Hiroki Katoh, took the top step of the podium, despite running in class A.

The 2005 edition was dominated by a joint effort between Amprex Motorsport and Proton R3 Racing, together they operated the team and their Lotus Exige 300RR won outright, completing 279 laps.

In 2006, Amprex Motorsport decided to bring back the Lamborghini Murcielago R-GT for the race but it was crippled in a practice accident, allowing Proton R3 Racing's Lotus Exige 300RR a clear run to victory number 2, completing 271 laps in the process. Faidzil Alang, Australian Damien French and Tengku Djan Ley shared the driving duties.

The 2007 race has been made more interesting with more participation from foreign teams racing teams, namely J's Racing Lab with a Honda S2000 and Juniper Racing with a 911 GT3 RSR. Famous racing drivers such as former F1 and 24 Hours of Le Mans driver Hans-Joachim Stuck also participated in the race. Year 2007 also record the highest participation so far with 103 cars signing up for the race but only 77 makes it to the starting grid in accordance to the FIA circuit license granted to Sepang International Circuit.

In 2008, the race was won by Darryl O'Young, Mok Wing Sun and Alexander Nicholas Davison of Porsche Club Singapore. Their Porsche 997 RSR completed 308 laps.

The race was renamed the Sepang 12 Hours in 2014, and in 2015 was run under the organisation of international sportscar racing authority the Stephane Ratel Organisation.

The race in 2017 was cancelled due to a lack of entries, and has not been held since.

=== 2018–2022 ===
After a break of 5 years, in 2022 it was announced race was returning for 2023 - the revival of the race is going to be organized by a partnership between Top Speed and Sepang International Circuit.

== Overall winners ==
Year	Team	Drivers	Car	Laps
2000	(Malaysia) Proton EON Racing Team	(Malaysia) Jimmy Low (Malaysia) Karamjit Singh (Malaysia) Tommy Lee	Proton PERT	253
2001	(Malaysia) Team TVR	(Malaysia) Jeffrey Wong (Malaysia) Admi Sharhal (Malaysia) Tommy Lee	TVR Chimaera	250
2002	(Malaysia) Jaseri Racing	(United Kingdom) Nigel Albon (Malaysia) Tunku Hammam (Malaysia) Tommy Lee	Porsche 911 GT3 Cup	262
2003	(Malaysia) G1 Meritus	(Malaysia) Eric Yeo (Malaysia) Chin Tzer-Jinn (Malaysia) Firhat Mohkzani	Porsche 911 GT3 Cup	268
2004	Honda Malaysia Racing Team	(Malaysia) Eddie Lew (Japan) Hiroki Katoh (Malaysia) Farriz Fauzy	Honda Civic 2.0 i-VTEC	265
2005	(Malaysia) Proton R3 Amprex	(Malaysia) Tengku Djan Ley (Japan) Genji Hashimoto (Australia) Tony Ricciardello	Lotus Exige 300RR	279
2006	(Malaysia) Proton R3 Team	(Malaysia) Tengku Djan Ley (Australia) Damien French (Malaysia) Faidzil Alang	Lotus Exige 300RR	271
2007	(Malaysia) Team Hong Leong-Kencana Racing	(Malaysia) Mokhzani Mahathir (Germany) Sven Herberger (Denmark) Lars Erik Nielsen	Porsche 911 GT3 RSR	288
2008	Team Porsche Club Singapore	(Australia) Alex Davison (Hong Kong) Darryl O'Young (Singapore) Weng Sun Mok	Porsche 997 RSR	308
2009	(Japan) Petronas Syntium Team	(Malaysia) Johan Adzmi (Japan) Tatsuya Kataoka (Japan) Manabu Orido	BMW Z4M Coupe	306
2010	(Malaysia) Arrows Racing	(Germany) Christopher Haase (Malaysia) Tunku Hammam (Netherlands) Peter Kox	Lamborghini LP560	315
2011	(Japan) Petronas Syntium Team	(Malaysia) Dominic Ang (Japan) Nobuteru Taniguchi (Japan) Masataka Yanagida	Mercedes-Benz SLS AMG GT3	321
2012	(Japan) Petronas Syntium Team	(Malaysia) Dominic Ang (Japan) Nobuteru Taniguchi (Japan) Masataka Yanagida	Mercedes-Benz SLS AMG GT3	319
2013	(Singapore) Clearwater Racing	(New Zealand) Craig Baird (Japan) Hiroshi Hamaguchi (Singapore) Weng Sun Mok	Ferrari 458 Italia GT3	323
2014	(Singapore) Clearwater Racing	(Italy) Gianmaria Bruni (Malaysia) Alif Hamdan (Singapore) Weng Sun Mok	Ferrari 458 Italia GT3	325
2015	(Belgium) Belgian Audi Club Team WRT	(United Kingdom) Stuart Leonard (Monaco) Stéphane Ortelli (Belgium) Laurens Vanthoor	Audi R8 LMS	228
2016	(Germany) Audi Sport Team Phoenix	(Netherlands) Robin Frijns (Germany) Christopher Haase (Belgium) Laurens Vanthoor	Audi R8 LMS	305
2017	Race Cancelled			
2018 – 2022	Not held			
2023	(Hong Kong) Absolute Racing	(Indonesia) Andrew Haryanto (Germany) Markus Winkelhock (China) James Yu	Audi R8 LMS Evo II	215
2024	(China) R&B Racing	(China) Lu Wei (China) Leo Ye Hongli (China) Bo Yuan	Porsche 911 GT3 R (992)	322
2025	(China) 33R Harmony Racing	(Malaysia) Jason Loh (China) Chen Weian (China) Luo Kailuo (Malaysia) Jazeman Jaafar	Ferrari 296 GT3	328

=== Multiple race winners ===
Wins	Driver
3	(Malaysia) Tommy Lee
3	(Singapore) Weng Sun Mok
2	(Malaysia) Tengku Djan Ley
2	(Malaysia) Tunku Hammam Sulong
2	(Japan) Nobuteru Taniguchi
2	(Japan) Masataka Yanagida
2	(Malaysia) Dominic Ang
2	(Germany) Christopher Haase
2	(Belgium) Laurens Vanthoor

Wins	Manufacturer
5	Porsche
3	Audi
3	Ferrari
2	Lotus
2	Mercedes-Benz

== Records ==
- Tommy Lee is the only driver to have won the Open class three times. He raced for three different teams for the wins: PERT, TVR and Jaseri Racing.
- The Honda Malaysia Racing Team (HMRT) has won class A five times in a row from 2003 to 2007, it also won the race overall in 2004.
- Malaysian driver Jazeman Jaafar became the youngest participant of MMER in 2007, at the age of 14.
- Team Porsche Club Singapore became the first foreign team to win the Merdeka Millennium Endurance in 2008.
