= Tengku Djan Ley =

Malaysian racing driver (born 1976)

Yang Mulia Tengku Djan Ley
- Born: Tengku Djan Ley bin Tengku Mahaleel; 30 December 1976 (age 49); Kuala Lumpur
- Other names: Prince of Drift; Tandem Assassin
- Occupations: Head of Lotus Cars Malaysia; Head of Proton Motorsports; Professional Drift Car Driver; Professional Racing Driver
- Known for: Motor racing Malaysia Merdeka Endurance Race Winner (2005, 2006); Formula Drift Asia Champion (2009, 2010); All Star Professional Thailand Drift Series Champion (2011)
- Relatives: Sultanah Maliha (aunt)
- Website: http://www.princeofdrift.com

Tengku Djan Ley bin Tengku Mahaleel is the head of Proton Motorsports and is also a Malaysian professional drift driver who has taken part in the D1 Grand Prix racing series and others. He has won the 12-hour Merdeka Millennium Endurance race twice, in 2005 and 2006. Tengku Djan Ley is one of the Kelantan royal lineage on his paternal side. His aunt is the reigning Sultanah of Kedah, Sultanah Maliha who is the biological sister of his father.

== 2005 FIA GT Championship – Zhuhai, China Round ==
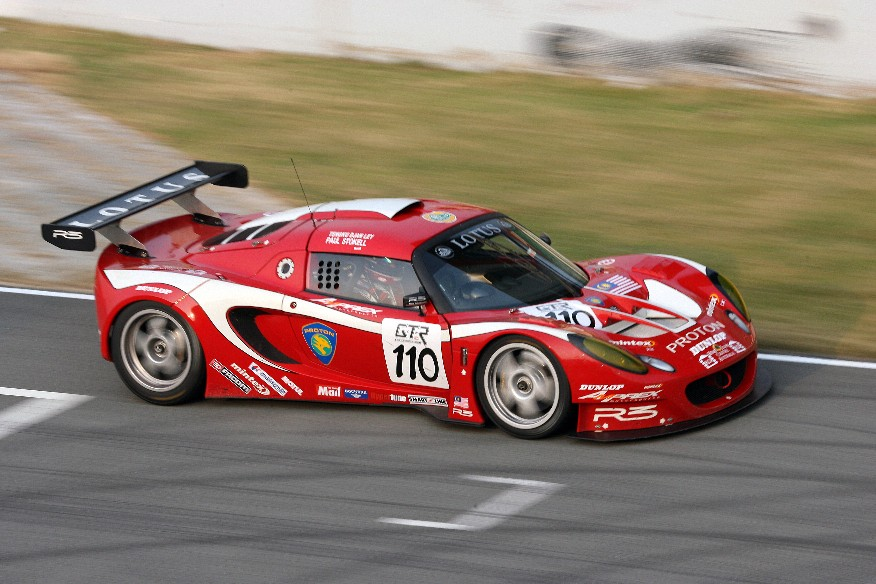
Tengku Djan Ley racing the Lotus Exige 300RR at Zhuhai International Circuit.

Tengku Djan Ley also competed in the 2005 FIA GT Zhuhai Supercar 500 race, sharing a Lotus Exige 300RR with Paul Stokell, the pair finished 14th overall and 2nd in G2 class.

== 2008–09 A1 Team Malaysia ==
Tengku Djan Ley was also the deputy technical director of A1 Team Malaysia starting from 2008/09 season of A1 Grand Prix.

== Drifting ==
Tengku Djan Ley also actively participates in drift racing, taking part in D1 Grand Prix-sanctioned events as well as the sister tournament of the Formula Drift series, the Formula Drift Asia. He participated in the D1 GP "World All-Star" tournament at Irwindale Speedway in 2006 and 2007, finishing 5th and 4th in the respective years. He also raced in the Formula Drift Asia series, winning the championship in 2009 and 2010. In 2011, he chose to take a break from Formula Drift Asia to join the All-Star Professional Thailand Drift Series with the Red Bull Drift Team Thailand, winning the championship with convincing fashion although his car is one of the least powerful in the series. Another of his notable performances in 2011 was during the Formula Drift Qatar event, where he drove his street legal Nissan 180SX and took out many notables drivers including Daijiro Yoshihara and Frederic Aasbo who were piloting more powerful purpose-built drift machines. His impressive form saw him finishing 2nd, just behind former Formula Drift champion Tanner Foust.

== Achievements ==
- 2005 Merdeka Millennium Endurance Race – Overall winner [Proton R3 Lotus Exige 300RR]
- 2005 FIA GT Zhuhai Supercar 500 – 2nd in class, 14th overall [Proton R3 Lotus Exige 300RR]
- 2006 Merdeka Millennium Endurance Race – Overall winner [Proton R3 Lotus Exige 300RR]
- 2006 D1 Grand Prix Malaysia – Champion [Bridgestone Malaysia Toyota Corolla AE86]
- 2006 D1 Grand Prix "All-Star" World Championship – 5th place [Bridgestone Malaysia Toyota Corolla AE86]
- 2007 D1 Grand Prix "All-Star" World Championship – Best 8 [Bridgestone Malaysia Toyota Corolla AE86]
- 2008 Red Bull Drifting World Championship – Best 16 [Bridgestone Malaysia Nissan SilEighty S13.5]
- 2008 D1 Grand Prix "Tokyo Drift" Odaiba – Top 32 [Quarter Mile Garage Nissan 180SX]
- 2008 Formula Drift Pro-Am Singapore – 25th position [Bridgestone/Firehawk Malaysia Toyota Corolla AE86]
- 2009 Formula Drift Asia – Champion [Bridgestone Malaysia Nissan SilEighty S13.5]
- 2010 Formula Drift Asia – Champion [Bridgestone Malaysia Nissan SilEighty S13.5]
- 2011 Formula Drift Qatar Global Challenge – 2nd place [Bridgestone Malaysia Nissan 180SX]
- 2012 Formula Drift Asia – 2nd runner-up [Drive M7 Bridgestone Nissan 180SX]

== Film ==
- Impak Maksima (2007) as himself (cameo appearance)
