= Anthony Best =

British businessman and engineer (born 1937)

Anthony Best (born June 1937) is a British businessman and engineer who founded AB Dynamics, and most recently served as its Chairman until 2021.

== Biography ==
Best studied Mechanical Sciences Tripos (Engineering) at Jesus College, Cambridge, graduating in 1960, upgraded to an MA in 1964. After a spell as a Production Manager at Avon Rubber, in 1967 Best joined Alex Moulton at Moulton Developments as Chief Engineer working on vehicle suspensions for cars, trucks and coaches, before founding Anthony Best Dynamics Limited in 1982.

He was awarded the Institution of Mechanical Engineers' Thomas Hawksley Medal and the Automobile Division's Crompton Lanchester Medal in 1979. He is a Fellow of the Royal Academy of Engineering, a Fellow of the Institution of Mechanical Engineers and is on the Court of the Worshipful Company of Engineers.
