= Scott Pedder =

Australian rally driver (born 1976)

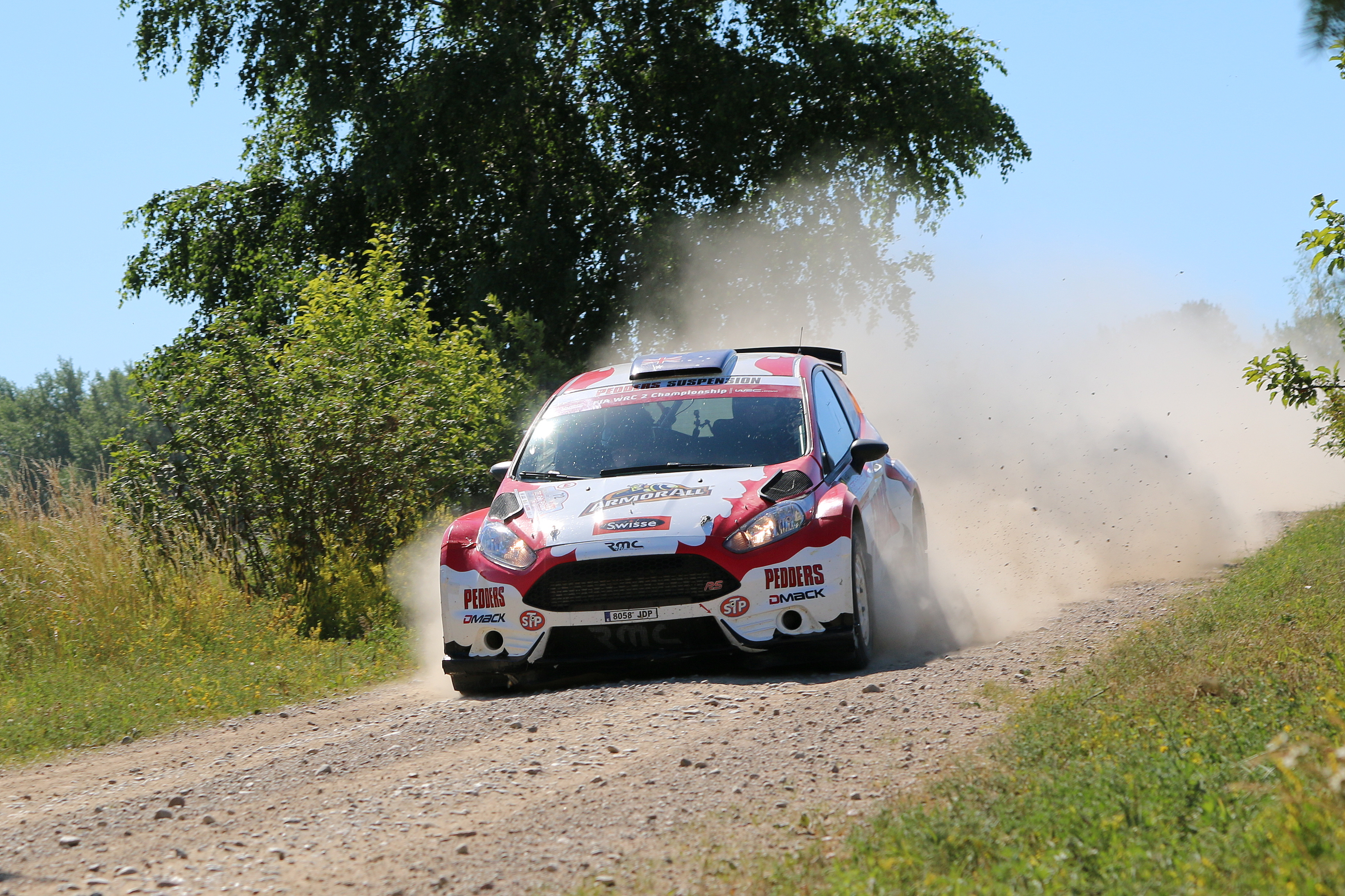
Scott Pedder during Rally Poland 2015

Scott Michael Pedder (born 1976) is an Australian rally driver who won the 2014 Australian Rally Championship driving a Renault Clio.

== Career highlights ==
- Driver for Factory Mitsubishi Team in the 2005 and 2006 Australian Rally Championship and Mitsubishi Japan for the 2008 Asia-Pacific Championship.
- Outright Wins in 2005 Rally South Australia and 2006 Rally of Melbourne.
- 2nd Outright 2002 and 2003 International (APRC) Rally of Canberra.
- 12 Event Podium Placings 2002–2006.
- 1998 Round Australia Rally Finisher (6th).
- 1999 and 2000 Victorian Rally Champion.
- CEO of the Bosch Australian Rally Championship in October 2012.
- Winner of the 2014 Australian Rally Championship driving a Renault Clio
- Placed 18th in the WRC2 Drivers standings of the 2015 World Rally Championship
