= Honda Jazz =

The Honda Jazz nameplate has been used by the Japanese manufacturer Honda to denote several different motorized vehicles since 1982:

- 1982–1986 — The first generation Honda City when marketed in Europe, as Opel owned the City name
- 1986–2001 — A 50 cc cruiser-style motorcycle (AC09)
- 1993–1996 — Japanese-market name for a badge-engineered Isuzu MU (Isuzu Amigo)
- 2001–present — In Europe, Oceania, the Middle East, Southeast Asia, India, and Africa the Honda Fit five-door hatchback automobile is sold as the Jazz
- 2002–2009 — Canadian-market name used on the Honda CHF50 scooter
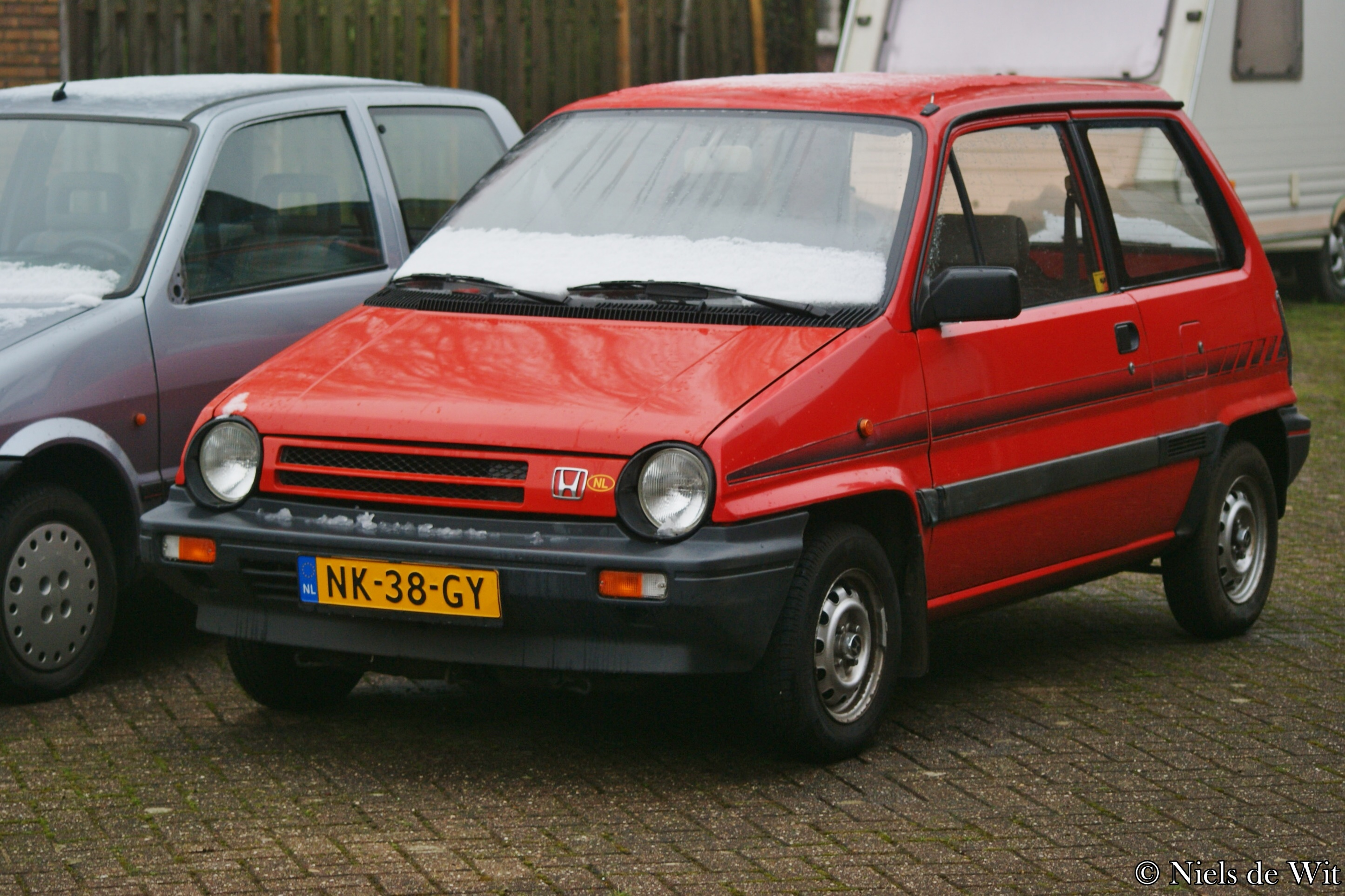
Honda Jazz (1982–1986)

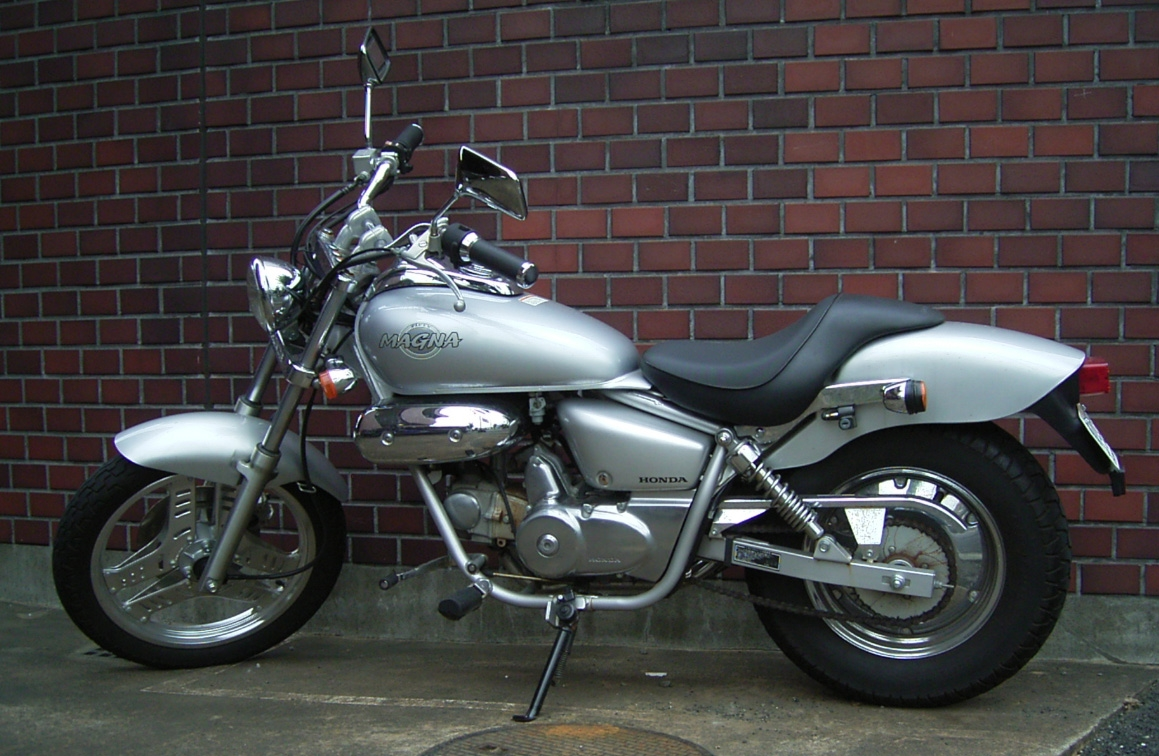
Honda Jazz (AC09, 1986–2001), similar to the Magna pictured

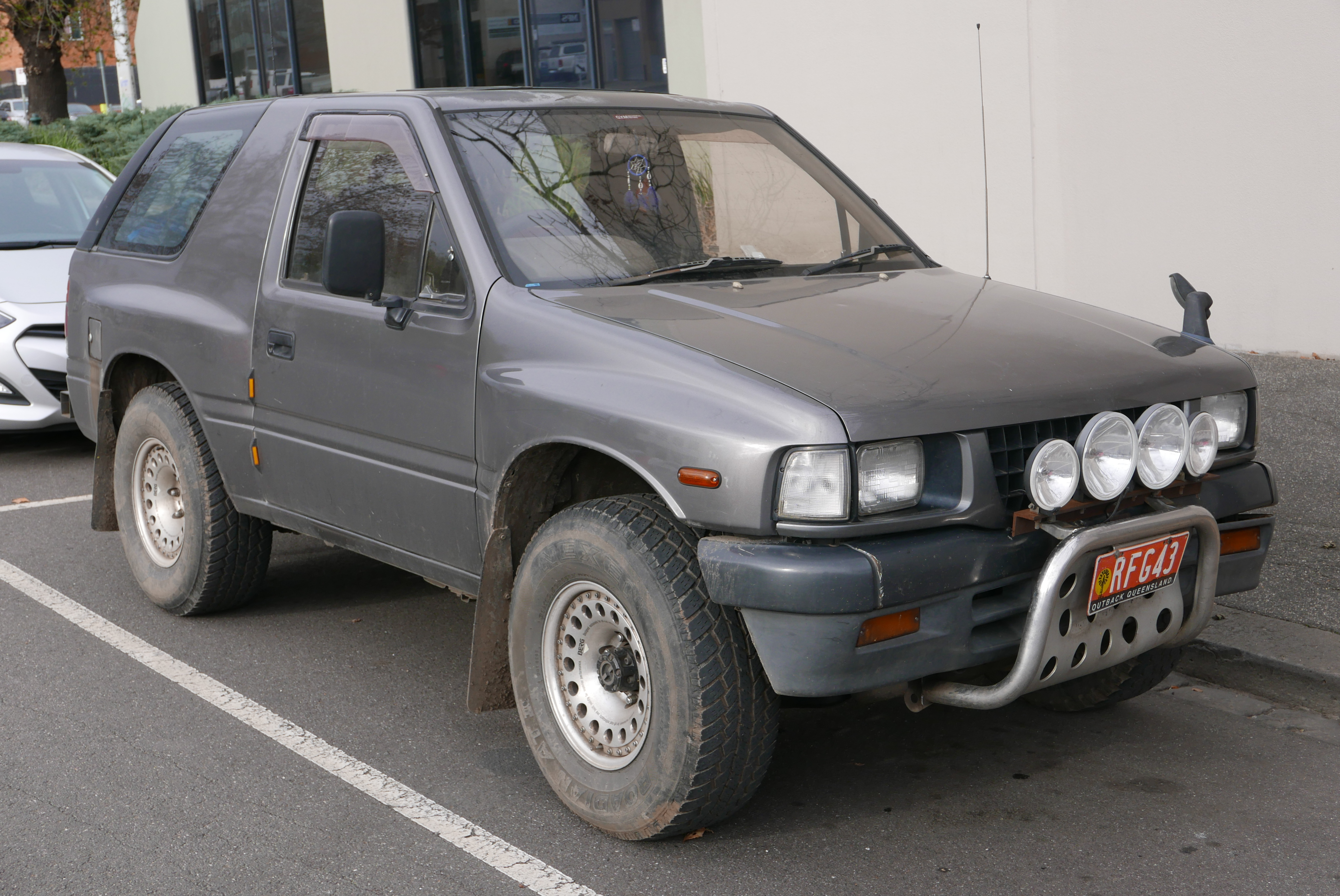
Honda Jazz (UCS69) (1993–1996)

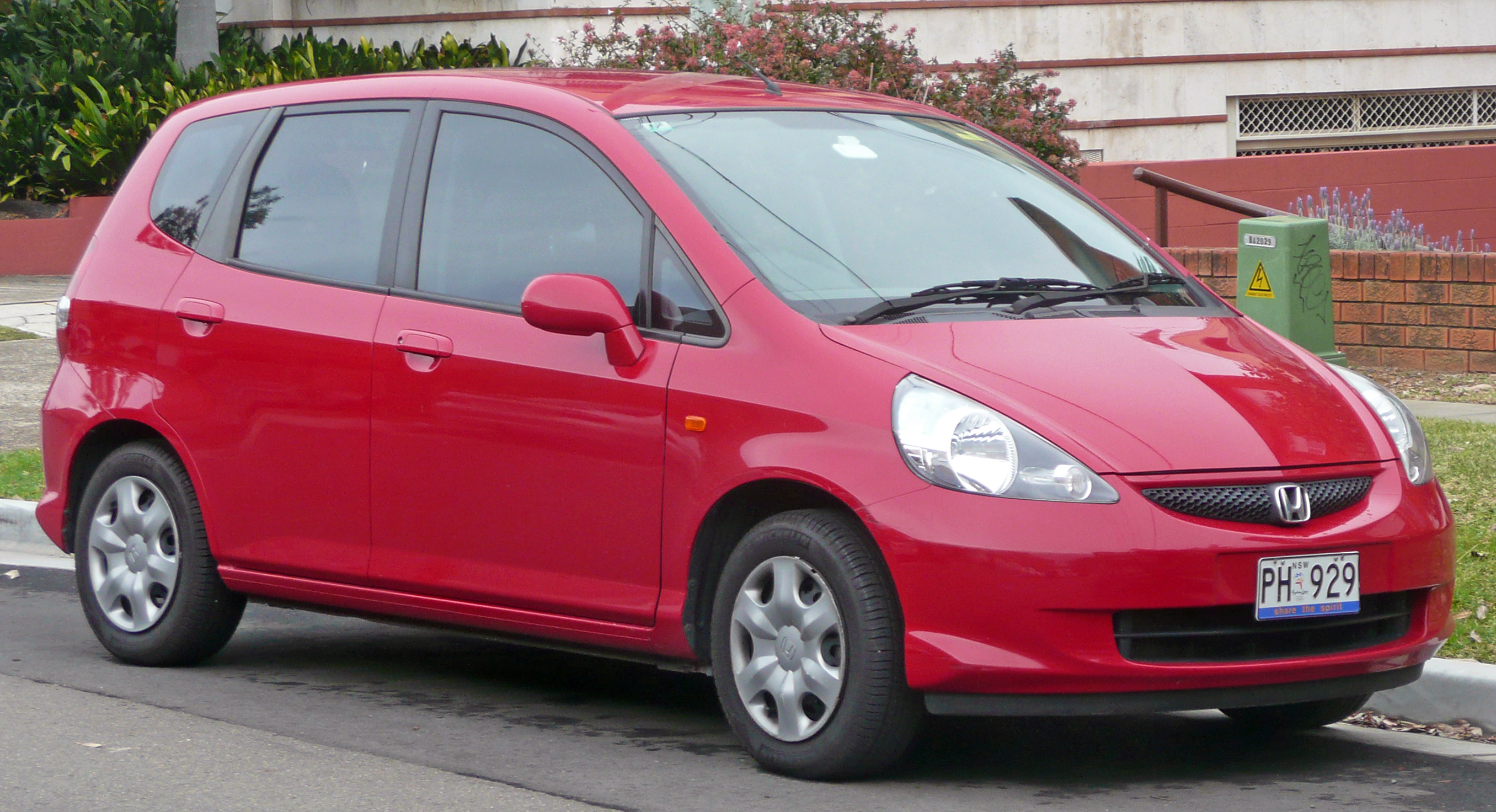
Honda Jazz (June 2001–present)

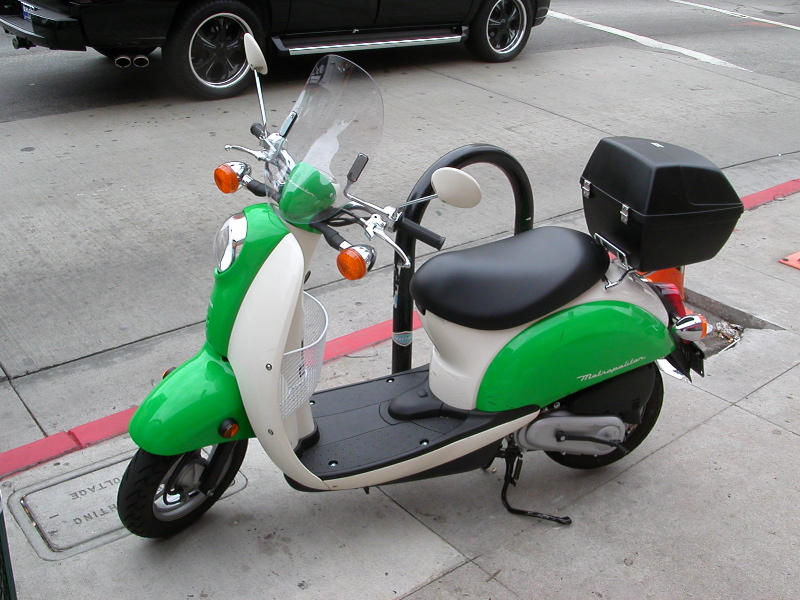
Honda Jazz scooter (1996–2002)
