= 2014 Blancpain GT Series =

2014 sports car racing series

The 2014 Blancpain GT Series season was the first season of the Blancpain GT Series. The season started on 12 April at Monza and ended on 2 November in Baku. The season featured twelve rounds, five Blancpain Endurance Series rounds and seven Blancpain Sprint Series rounds.

== Calendar ==
Event	Circuit	Date	Series	Report
1	Autodromo Nazionale Monza, Monza, Italy	13 April	Endurance	Report
2	Circuit Paul Armagnac, Nogaro, France	21 April	Sprint	Report
3	(United Kingdom) Brands Hatch, Kent, Great Britain	18 May	Sprint	Report
4	Silverstone Circuit, Silverstone United Kingdom	25 May	Endurance	Report
5	Circuit Paul Ricard, Le Castellet, France	28 June	Endurance	Report
6	Circuit Park Zandvoort, Noord-Holland, Netherlands	6 July	Sprint	Report
7	Circuit de Spa-Francorchamps, Stavelot, Belgium	26–27 July	Endurance	Report
8	Automotodróm Slovakia Ring, Orechová Potôň, Slovakia	24 August	Sprint	Report
9	Algarve International Circuit, Algarve, Portugal	7 September	Sprint	Report
10	Nürburgring, Nürburg, Germany	21 September	Endurance	Report
11	Circuit Zolder, Heusden-Zolder, Belgium	19 October	Sprint	Report
12	Baku World Challenge, Baku, Azerbaijan	2 November	Sprint	Report

== Race results ==
Event		Circuit	Series	Pole position	Race winner
1		(Italy) Monza	BES	(France) No. 98 ART Grand Prix	(France) No. 98 ART Grand Prix
1		(Italy) Monza	BES	(France) Grégoire Demoustier (Portugal) Álvaro Parente (France) Alexandre Prémat	(France) Grégoire Demoustier (Portugal) Álvaro Parente (France) Alexandre Prémat
2	QR	(France) Nogaro	BSS	(Austria) No. 28 Grasser Racing Team	(Belgium) No. 1 Belgian Audi Club Team WRT
2	QR	(France) Nogaro	BSS	(Austria) Harald Proczyk (Netherlands) Jeroen Bleekemolen	(Belgium) Laurens Vanthoor (Brazil) César Ramos
2	CR	(France) Nogaro	BSS	(Belgium) No. 1 Belgian Audi Club Team WRT	(Germany) No. 84 HTP Motorsport
2	CR	(France) Nogaro	BSS	(Belgium) Laurens Vanthoor (Brazil) César Ramos	(Germany) Maximilian Buhk (Germany) Maximilian Götz
3	QR	(United Kingdom) Brands Hatch	BSS	(Belgium) No. 1 Belgian Audi Club Team WRT	(Austria) No. 28 Grasser Racing Team
3	QR	(United Kingdom) Brands Hatch	BSS	(Belgium) Laurens Vanthoor (Brazil) César Ramos	(Austria) Harald Proczyk (Netherlands) Jeroen Bleekemolen
3	CR	(United Kingdom) Brands Hatch	BSS	(Austria) No. 28 Grasser Racing Team	(Austria) No. 28 Grasser Racing Team
3	CR	(United Kingdom) Brands Hatch	BSS	(Austria) Harald Proczyk (Netherlands) Jeroen Bleekemolen	(Austria) Harald Proczyk (Netherlands) Jeroen Bleekemolen
4		(United Kingdom) Silverstone	BES	(France) No. 93 Pro GT by Alméras	(United Kingdom) No. 7 M-Sport Bentley
4		(United Kingdom) Silverstone	BES	(France) Eric Dermont (France) Franck Perera	(United Kingdom) Steven Kane (United Kingdom) Guy Smith (United Kingdom) Andy Meyrick
5		(France) Paul Ricard	BES	(France) No. 98 ART Grand Prix	(United Kingdom) No. 7 M-Sport Bentley
5		(France) Paul Ricard	BES	(France) Grégoire Demoustier (Portugal) Álvaro Parente (France) Nicolas Lapierre	(United Kingdom) Steven Kane (United Kingdom) Guy Smith (United Kingdom) Andy Meyrick
6	QR	(Netherlands) Zandvoort	BSS	(Austria) No. 28 Grasser Racing Team	(Austria) No. 28 Grasser Racing Team
6	QR	(Netherlands) Zandvoort	BSS	(Austria) Harald Proczyk (Netherlands) Jeroen Bleekemolen	(Austria) Harald Proczyk (Netherlands) Jeroen Bleekemolen
6	CR	(Netherlands) Zandvoort	BSS	(Austria) No. 28 Grasser Racing Team	(Belgium) No. 2 Belgian Audi Club Team WRT
6	CR	(Netherlands) Zandvoort	BSS	(Austria) Harald Proczyk (Netherlands) Jeroen Bleekemolen	(Germany) René Rast (Belgium) Enzo Ide
7		(Belgium) Spa-Francorchamps	BES	(Belgium) No. 1 Belgian Audi Club Team WRT	(Belgium) No. 1 Belgian Audi Club Team WRT
7		(Belgium) Spa-Francorchamps	BES	(Belgium) Laurens Vanthoor (Germany) René Rast (Germany) Markus Winkelhock	(Belgium) Laurens Vanthoor (Germany) René Rast (Germany) Markus Winkelhock
8	QR	Slovakia Ring	BSS	(Belgium) No. 1 Belgian Audi Club Team WRT	(Belgium) No. 1 Belgian Audi Club Team WRT
8	QR	Slovakia Ring	BSS	(Belgium) Laurens Vanthoor (Brazil) César Ramos	(Belgium) Laurens Vanthoor (Brazil) César Ramos
8	CR	Slovakia Ring	BSS	(Belgium) No. 1 Belgian Audi Club Team WRT	(Germany) No.76 BMW Sports Trophy Team Schubert
8	CR	Slovakia Ring	BSS	(Belgium) Laurens Vanthoor (Brazil) César Ramos	(Austria) Dominik Baumann (Austria) Thomas Jäger
9	QR	(Portugal) Algarve	BSS	(Russia) No. 3 G-Drive Racing	(Austria) No. 28 Grasser Racing Team
9	QR	(Portugal) Algarve	BSS	(Russia) Roman Rusinov (Czech Republic) Tomáš Enge	(Austria) Harald Proczyk (Netherlands) Jeroen Bleekemolen
9	CR	(Portugal) Algarve	BSS	(Austria) No. 28 Grasser Racing Team	(Germany) No. 84 HTP Motorsport
9	CR	(Portugal) Algarve	BSS	(Austria) Harald Proczyk (Netherlands) Jeroen Bleekemolen	(Germany) Maximilian Buhk (Germany) Maximilian Götz
10		(Germany) Nürburgring	BES	(Belgium) No. 1 Belgian Audi Club Team WRT	(Belgium) No. 1 Belgian Audi Club Team WRT
10		(Germany) Nürburgring	BES	(Belgium) Laurens Vanthoor (Brazil) César Ramos (Germany) Christopher Mies	(Belgium) Laurens Vanthoor (Brazil) César Ramos (Germany) Christopher Mies
11	QR	(Belgium) Zolder	BSS	(Belgium) No. 1 Belgian Audi Club Team WRT	(Belgium) No. 1 Belgian Audi Club Team WRT
11	QR	(Belgium) Zolder	BSS	(Belgium) Laurens Vanthoor (Brazil) César Ramos	(Belgium) Laurens Vanthoor (Brazil) César Ramos
11	CR	(Belgium) Zolder	BSS	(Belgium) No. 1 Belgian Audi Club Team WRT	(Germany) No. 84 HTP Motorsport
11	CR	(Belgium) Zolder	BSS	(Belgium) Laurens Vanthoor (Brazil) César Ramos	(Germany) Maximilian Buhk (Germany) Maximilian Götz
12	QR	(Azerbaijan) Baku	BSS	(Belgium) No. 9 Belgian Audi Club Team WRT	(Belgium) No. 1 Belgian Audi Club Team WRT
12	QR	(Azerbaijan) Baku	BSS	(Monaco) Stéphane Ortelli (Monaco) Stéphane Richelmi	(Belgium) Laurens Vanthoor (Brazil) César Ramos
12	CR	(Azerbaijan) Baku	BSS	(Belgium) No. 1 Belgian Audi Club Team WRT	(Belgium) No. 1 Belgian Audi Club Team WRT
12	CR	(Azerbaijan) Baku	BSS	(Belgium) Laurens Vanthoor (Brazil) César Ramos	(Belgium) Laurens Vanthoor (Brazil) César Ramos

== Championship standings ==
Scoring system

Championship points were awarded for the first six positions in each Qualifying Race and for the first ten positions in each Championship Race. Entries were required to complete 75% of the winning car's race distance in order to be classified and earn points. Individual drivers were required to participate for a minimum of 25 minutes in order to earn championship points in any race. There were no points awarded for the Pole Position.

Qualifying Race points

Position	**1st**	**2nd**	**3rd**	**4th**	**5th**	**6th**
Points	8	6	4	3	2	1

Championship Race points

Position	**1st**	**2nd**	**3rd**	**4th**	**5th**	**6th**	**7th**	**8th**	**9th**	**10th**
Points	25	18	15	12	10	8	6	4	2	1

24 Hours of Spa points

Points were awarded after six hours, after twelve hours and at the finish.

Position	**1st**	**2nd**	**3rd**	**4th**	**5th**	**6th**	**7th**	**8th**	**9th**	**10th**
Points after 6hrs/12hrs	12	9	7	6	5	4	3	2	1	0
Points at the finish	25	18	15	12	10	8	6	4	2	1

1000 km Nürburgring points

Position	**1st**	**2nd**	**3rd**	**4th**	**5th**	**6th**	**7th**	**8th**	**9th**	**10th**
Points	33	24	19	15	12	9	6	4	2	1

=== Drivers' Championship (Top 45) ===
Pos.	Driver	Team	MNZ (Italy)	NOG (France)		BRH (United Kingdom)		SIL (United Kingdom)	LEC (France)	ZAN (Netherlands)		SPA (Belgium)			SVK (Slovakia)		ALG (Portugal)		NÜR (Germany)	ZOL (Belgium)		BAK (Azerbaijan)		Total
Pos.	Driver	Team	CR	QR	CR	QR	CR	CR	CR	QR	CR	6hrs	12hrs	24hrs	QR	CR	QR	CR	CR	QR	CR	QR	CR	Total
1	(Belgium) Laurens Vanthoor	(Belgium) Belgian Audi Club Team WRT	4	1	Ret	**6**	4	3	8	3	10	**4**	1	1	**1**	11	4	8	**1**	**1**	3	1	1	200
2	(Germany) Maximilian Buhk	(Germany) HTP Motorsport	5	5	1	2	2		4	2	4	6	6	5			2	1	2	6	1	9	Ret	190
3	(Germany) Maximilian Götz	(Germany) HTP Motorsport		5	1	2	2			2	4	6	6	5	3	4	2	1		6	1	9	Ret	160
4	(Brazil) César Ramos	(Belgium) Belgian Audi Club Team WRT	4	1	Ret	**6**	4	3	8	3	10				**1**	11	4	8	**1**	**1**	3	1	1	157
5	(Monaco) Stéphane Ortelli	(France) Saintéloc Racing	2					4	5			2	4	4					34					120
5	(Monaco) Stéphane Ortelli	(Russia) G-Drive Racing		4	2	Ret	13			9	Ret													120
5	(Monaco) Stéphane Ortelli	(Belgium) Belgian Audi Club Team WRT													12	Ret	17	3		23	10	**3**	4	120
6	(Germany) René Rast	(Belgium) Belgian Audi Club Team WRT		DSQ	7	14	9			4	1	**4**	1	1	9	3	3	5		4	Ret	4	Ret	114
7	(Netherlands) Jeroen Bleekemolen (Austria) Harald Proczyk	(Austria) Grasser Racing Team		**17**	6	1	1			**1**	5				2	Ret	1	2		3	2	15	Ret	113
8	(France) Grégory Guilvert	(France) Saintéloc Racing	2					4	5			2	4	4					34					88
8	(France) Grégory Guilvert	(Russia) G-Drive Racing		4	2																			88
9	(Netherlands) Stef Dusseldorp (Russia) Sergey Afanasyev	(Germany) HTP Motorsport	11	6	4	Ret	Ret	5	3	Ret	DNS	54	54	Ret	Ret	6	5	11	2	11	4	Ret	Ret	84
10	(Spain) Andy Soucek	(France) ART Grand Prix	3					2	Ret			20	51	Ret					5					81
10	(Spain) Andy Soucek	(United Kingdom) Beechdean AMR																		5	5	2	2	81
11	(Germany) Christopher Mies	(Belgium) Belgian Audi Club Team WRT	Ret					9	7			1	3	3					**1**					75
11	(Germany) Christopher Mies	(Germany) Prosperia ABT Racing																				Ret	15	75
11	(Germany) Markus Winkelhock	(Germany) Phoenix Racing		2	Ret	5	Ret			Ret	11				15	Ret	Ret	6		16	18	6	3	75
11	(Germany) Markus Winkelhock	(Belgium) Belgian Audi Club Team WRT										**4**	1	1										75
12	(Belgium) Enzo Ide	(Belgium) Belgian Audi Club Team WRT		DSQ	7	14	9			4	1				9	3	3	5		4	Ret	4	Ret	71
13	(Sweden) Edward Sandström	(France) Saintéloc Racing	2					4	5			2	4	4					34					67
14	(United Kingdom) Andy Meyrick (United Kingdom) Guy Smith (United Kingdom) Steven Kane	(United Kingdom) M-Sport Bentley	8					1	1			38	15	13					8					58
15	(Brazil) Cacá Bueno (Brazil) Sérgio Jimenez	(Brazil) BMW Sports Trophy Team Brasil		3	5	3	3			Ret	14				7	2	9	14		21	8			55
15	(Belgium) Nico Verdonck	(Germany) HTP Motorsport	5					6	4			3	10	9	3	4			14					55
16	(Portugal) Álvaro Parente	(France) ART Grand Prix	**1**					7	**2**			21	43	Ret					Ret					49
16	(Portugal) Álvaro Parente	(Italy) Bhaitech																				20	16	49
16	(France) Grégoire Demoustier	(France) ART Grand Prix	**1**					7	**2**			21	43	Ret					Ret					49
17	(Austria) Dominik Baumann	(Germany) BMW Sports Trophy Team Schubert								5	2				Ret	1	13	13		8	Ret	Ret	Ret	45
17	(Austria) Thomas Jäger	(Germany) BMW Sports Trophy Team Schubert								5	2				Ret	1	13	13		8	Ret			45
17	(France) Kévin Estre	(France) ART Grand Prix	3					2	Ret			20	51	Ret					5					45
17	(France) Kévin Estre	(Belgium) Boutsen Ginion																				21	18	45
17	(Estonia) Kevin Korjus	(France) ART Grand Prix	3					2	Ret			20	51	Ret					5					45
18	(United Kingdom) James Nash (Germany) Frank Stippler	(Belgium) Belgian Audi Club Team WRT	Ret					9	7			1	3	3					26					42
19	(Germany) Marc Basseng	(Belgium) Belgian Audi Club Team WRT	4					3	13										26					41
19	(Germany) Marc Basseng	(Germany) Phoenix Racing		10	9	13	11			10	13				8	7	11	7		15	15	DNS	DNS	41
19	(Germany) Marc Basseng	(Czech Republic) ISR Racing										18	16	14										41
20	(Switzerland) Harold Primat	(Germany) HTP Motorsport	5					6	4			3	10	9					14					39
21	(United Kingdom) Jonathan Adam	(United Kingdom) Leonard Motorsport AMR						23																36
21	(United Kingdom) Jonathan Adam	(United Kingdom) Beechdean AMR										56	56	Ret						5	5	2	2	36
22	(Germany) Lucas Wolf	(Germany) HTP Motorsport	11					5	3						17	5	8	17		19	12	19	DNS	35
23	(Germany) Lucas Luhr (Finland) Markus Palttala (Germany) Dirk Werner	(Belgium) BMW Sports Trophy Team Marc VDS										5	2	2										32
23	(Austria) Nikolaus Mayr-Melnhof	(Germany) Phoenix Racing		2	Ret	5	Ret			Ret	11				15	Ret	Ret	6		16	18	6	3	32
24	(France) Alexandre Prémat	(France) ART Grand Prix	**1**					7											Ret					31
25	(Netherlands) Nick Catsburg	(France) TDS Racing	21					37	6			12	9	Ret					4					30
25	(Netherlands) Nick Catsburg	(Belgium) NSC Motorsports																		2	Ret			30
26	(France) Vincent Abril (Poland) Mateusz Lisowski	(Belgium) Belgian Audi Club Team WRT		7	3	12	6			11	9				6	9	7	Ret		17	11	Ret	17	28
27	(France) Henry Hassid	(France) TDS Racing	21					37	6			12	9	Ret					4					24
27	(Sweden) Andreas Simonsen	(Germany) Black Falcon	14					22	9			8	32	Ret					3					24
27	(Sweden) Andreas Simonsen	(Germany) Zakspeed																				13	10	24
28	(Saudi Arabia) Abdulaziz Al Faisal (Germany) Hubert Haupt	(Germany) Black Falcon	14					22	9			8	32	Ret					3					23
29	(Italy) Giorgio Pantano	(Italy) Bhaitech		11	8	8	16			13	Ret				Ret	Ret	Ret	10		7	6	12	7	19
29	(Italy) Giorgio Pantano	(Belgium) Boutsen Ginion										58	58	Ret										19
29	(Italy) Fabio Onidi	(Italy) Bhaitech		11	8	8	16			13	Ret				Ret	Ret	Ret	10		7	6	12	7	19
30	(France) Nicolas Lapierre	(France) ART Grand Prix							**2**			21	43	Ret										18
30	(Malaysia) Jazeman Jaafar	(Germany) HTP Motorsport										6	6	5										18
31	(Germany) Bernd Schneider	(Germany) HTP Motorsport						6				3	10	9					14					17
31	(Monaco) Stéphane Richelmi	(Belgium) Belgian Audi Club Team WRT																	22	23	10	**3**	4	17
32	(Germany) Robert Renauer (Netherlands) Jaap van Lagen	(Germany) Tonino Team Herberth								6	3													16
33	(Germany) Fabian Hamprecht	(Czech Republic) ISR Racing										18	16	14										15
33	(Germany) Fabian Hamprecht	(Belgium) Belgian Audi Club Team WRT													12	Ret	17	3						15
33	(Czech Republic) Tomáš Enge	(Germany) Reiter Engineering	16			9	Ret								Ret	DNS								15
33	(Czech Republic) Tomáš Enge	(Austria) Grasser Racing Team		9	16																			15
33	(Czech Republic) Tomáš Enge	(Russia) G-Drive Racing															**6**	4		13	9			15
33	(Russia) Roman Rusinov	(Russia) G-Drive Racing (Note: During the events at Nogaro, Brands Hatch and Zandvoort, G-Drive Racing ran as a support team for the W Racing Team. During the events at Portimão and Zolder, G-Drive Racing formed part of the Reiter Engineering entry.)				Ret	13			9	Ret						**6**	4		13	9			15
33	(Italy) Stefano Gai (Italy) Andrea Rizzoli	(Italy) Scuderia Villorba Corse	9					14	8			10	7	15					7					15
34	(Brazil) Matheus Stumpf	(Brazil) BMW Sports Trophy Team Brasil		18	15	4	8			12	8				4	Ret	10	16		22	Ret	Ret	Ret	14
34	(United Kingdom) Alessandro Latif	(Germany) Phoenix Racing		10	9	13	11			10	13				8	7	11	7		15	15	DNS	DNS	14
35	(Czech Republic) Filip Salaquarda	(Italy) Scuderia Villorba Corse		8	10	7	7			17	DNS				Ret	DNS				9	7			13
35	(Czech Republic) Filip Salaquarda	(Czech Republic) ISR Racing										18	16	14										13
35	(Czech Republic) Filip Salaquarda	(Italy) Bhaitech																				20	16	13
36	(Italy) Alex Zanardi	(Italy) ROAL Motorsport		14	13	17	5								10	Ret	14	9		10	13	Ret	DNS	12
36	(Netherlands) Peter Kox	(Germany) Reiter Engineering	16							16	7													12
36	(Netherlands) Peter Kox	(Switzerland) Blancpain Racing		12	Ret																			12
36	(Netherlands) Peter Kox	(Belgium) NSC Motorsports																		2	Ret			12
36	(New Zealand) Chris van der Drift	(Belgium) Boutsen Ginion							28			49	45	40					Ret			7	6	12
36	(New Zealand) Chris van der Drift	(Italy) Bhaitech													13	8	12	12		Ret	Ret			12
36	(Austria) Martin Ragginger	(Switzerland) Fach Auto Tech										46	41	26										12
36	(Austria) Martin Ragginger	(Germany) Schütz Motorsport																				5	5	12
36	(Germany) Marco Holzer	(Germany) Schütz Motorsport																				5	5	12
37	(Italy) Stefano Colombo	(Italy) ROAL Motorsport	6	15	11	11	10		19	15	12	39	44	35	5	13	Ret	15		12	17	Ret	14	11
37	(United Kingdom) Alexander Sims	(United Kingdom) Ecurie Ecosse										9	8	7										11
37	(United Kingdom) Alexander Sims	(United Kingdom) Triple 888 Racing																	9					11
38	(Germany) Luca Stolz	(Germany) HTP Motorsport													17	5	8	17		19	12	19	DNS	10
38	(Italy) Andrea Montermini	(Italy) Scuderia Villorba Corse		8	10	7	7					10	7	15	Ret	DNS								10
38	(Brazil) Valdeno Brito	(Brazil) BMW Sports Trophy Team Brasil				4	8								4	Ret								10
39	(Russia) Vladimir Lunkin	(Germany) Black Falcon	Ret					33	Ret			23	24	34					6					9
39	(Denmark) Anders Fjordbach (United Kingdom) Devon Modell	(Germany) Black Falcon																	6					9
39	(United Kingdom) Oliver Bryant (United Kingdom) Alasdair McCaig (United Kingdom) Andrew Smith	(United Kingdom) Ecurie Ecosse	12					18	12			9	8	7					11					9
39	(Monaco) Francesco Castellacci	(Italy) Scuderia Villorba Corse	9					14	8			10	7	15										9
39	(Monaco) Francesco Castellacci	(Italy) AF Corse																	16					9
40	(Italy) Eugenio Amos (Italy) Stefano Comandini	(Italy) ROAL Motorsport	6					12	19			39	44	35					Ret					8
40	(Austria) Sascha Halek	(Austria) Grasser Racing Team		9	16	15	15			8	6				16	12	16	19						48
40	(Austria) Stefan Landmann	(Austria) Grasser Racing Team				15	15			8	6				16	12	16	19		14	DNS	DNS	DNS	48
40	(Italy) Andrea Bertolini (Italy) Marco Cioci (Belgium) Niek Hommerson (Belgium) Louis Machiels	(Italy) AF Corse										19	13	6										8
40	(Switzerland) Marcel Fässler (Germany) André Lotterer (France) Benoît Tréluyer	(Belgium) Belgian Audi Club Team WRT										7	5	12										8
40	(Belgium) Frédéric Vervisch	(Belgium) Boutsen Ginion	Ret					35	21			58	58	Ret								7	6	8
41	(Italy) Alessandro Balzan	(Italy) Scuderia Villorba Corse								17	DNS									9	7			6
41	(Italy) Thomas Kemenater	(Italy) Scuderia Villorba Corse																	7					6
41	(Belgium) Jérôme d'Ambrosio (France) Antoine Leclerc (United Kingdom) Duncan Tappy	(United Kingdom) M-Sport Bentley	7					15	Ret			43	25	17					12					6
41	(Slovakia) Štefan Rosina	(Germany) Reiter Engineering				9	Ret			16	7				Ret	DNS								6
42	(Germany) Sven Barth (Germany) David Jahn	(Germany) Callaway - RWT																				14	8	4
42	(United Kingdom) Alex Buncombe (United States) Nick McMillen (Germany) Florian Strauss	(United Kingdom) Nissan GT Academy Team RJN	13					8	22			16	33	25					31					4
42	(Brazil) Nelson Piquet Jr.	(Brazil) BMW Sports Trophy Team Brasil		18	15					12	8						10	16		22	Ret			4
42	(Australia) Craig Lowndes (Italy) Andrea Piccini (Italy) Michele Rugolo (Australia) Steve Wyatt	(Italy) AF Corse										14	12	8										4
42	(Estonia) Sten Pentus	(Italy) Bhaitech		16	14	10	12			7	15				13	8	12	12		Ret	Ret			4
43	(Italy) David Fumanelli	(Italy) ROAL Motorsport		15	11	11	10			15	12				5	13	Ret	15		12	17	Ret	14	3
44	(Brazil) Ricardo Sperafico (Brazil) Rodrigo Sperafico	(Brazil) BMW Sports Trophy Team Brasil																				10	9	2
44	(United Kingdom) Jody Firth (United Kingdom) Warren Hughes	(United Kingdom) Triple 888 Racing																	9					2
45	(Israel) Alon Day	(Germany) Zakspeed																				13	10	1
45	(United Kingdom) Stuart Leonard (United Kingdom) Paul Wilson	(United Kingdom) Leonard Motorsport AMR						23				28	18	37					10					1
45	(United Kingdom) Michael Meadows	(United Kingdom) Leonard Motorsport AMR										28	18	37					10					1
45	(Spain) Miguel Toril	(United Kingdom) Fortec Motorsport		13	12	16	14			14	16				11	10	15	Ret		Ret	14	16	11	1
45	(India) Armaan Ebrahim	(United Kingdom) Fortec Motorsport		DNS	DNS	16	14			14	16				11	10	15	Ret						1
45	(Canada) Andrew Danyliw (Netherlands) Simon Knap (Italy) Andrea Sonvico	(Italy) AF Corse	10					25	11			55	55	Ret					33					1
45	(Japan) Katsumasa Chiyo (Portugal) Miguel Faísca	(United Kingdom) Nissan GT Academy Team RJN	Ret					20	10			52	47	38					13					1
45	(Russia) Stanislav Aksenov	(United Kingdom) Nissan GT Academy Team RJN						20	10															1
45	(Oman) Ahmad Al Harthy (United Kingdom) Michael Caine	Oman Racing Team	Ret					10	31			31	27	Ret					32					1
45	(United Kingdom) Stephen Jelley	Oman Racing Team	Ret					10	31			31	27	Ret										1
45	(Germany) Jens Klingmann	(France) TDS Racing										12	9	Ret										1
45	(Germany) Jens Klingmann	(Germany) BMW Sports Trophy Team Schubert																				Ret	Ret	1
45	(France) Pierre Thiriet	(France) TDS Racing										12	9	Ret										1
45	(United Kingdom) Joe Osborne	(United Kingdom) MP Motorsport AMR	26					11	17			11	14	10					32					1
45	(United Kingdom) Joe Osborne	(United Kingdom) Triple 888 Racing																				17	13	1
45	(United Kingdom) Richard Abra (United Kingdom) Mark Poole	(United Kingdom) MP Motorsport AMR	26					11	17			11	14	10					32					1
45	(United Kingdom) Darren Turner	(United Kingdom) MP Motorsport AMR										11	14	10										1

Key
Colour	Result
Gold	Race winner
Silver	2nd place
Bronze	3rd place
Green	Points finish
Blue	Non-points finish
Blue	Non-classified finish (NC)
Purple	Did not finish (Ret)
Black	Disqualified (DSQ)
Black	Excluded (EX)
White	Did not start (DNS)
White	Race cancelled (C)
White	Withdrew (WD)
Blank	Did not participate

**Bold** – Pole

== Footnotes ==
=== Teams' Championship ===
Pos.	Team	Manufacturer	Points
1	(Belgium) Belgian Audi Club Team WRT	Audi	284
2	(Germany) HTP Motorsport	Mercedes-Benz	236
3	(Austria) Grasser Racing Team	Lamborghini	121
4	(Brazil) BMW Sports Trophy Team Brasil	BMW	81
5	(France) Saintéloc Racing	Audi	78
6	(France) ART Grand Prix	McLaren	73
7	(United Kingdom) M-Sport Bentley	Bentley	68
8	(Germany) Phoenix Racing	Audi	66
9	(Italy) Scuderia Villorba Corse	Ferrari	55
10	(Germany) BMW Sports Trophy Team Schubert	BMW	51
11	(Italy) Bhaitech	McLaren	50
12	(Russia) G-Drive Racing	Audi/Lamborghini	42
13	(Italy) ROAL Motorsport	BMW	41
14	(United Kingdom) Beechdean AMR	Aston Martin	40
15	(Germany) Black Falcon	Mercedes-Benz	38
16	(France) TDS Racing	BMW	33
17	(United Kingdom) Ecurie Ecosse	BMW	23
18	(Italy) AF Corse	Ferrari	19
19	(Germany) Tonino Team Herberth	Porsche	17
20	(United Kingdom) MP Motorsport AMR	Aston Martin	16
21	(United Kingdom) Fortec Motorsport	Mercedes-Benz	15
22	(Belgium) Boutsen Ginion	McLaren	15
23	(United Kingdom) Nissan GT Academy Team RJN	Nissan	11
24	(Germany) Reiter Engineering	Lamborghini	8
25	Oman Racing Team	Aston Martin	6
26	(United Kingdom) Triple 888 Racing	BMW	6
27	(Russia) GT Russian Team	McLaren/Mercedes-Benz	4
28	(United Kingdom) Leonard Motorsport AMR	Aston Martin	2
29	(France) Pro GT by Alméras	Porsche	1
	(Switzerland) Blancpain Racing	Lamborghini	0
	(France) Sport Garage	Ferrari	0
	(Germany) All-Inkl.com Münnich Motorsport	Mercedes-Benz	0
	(France) Graff Racing	Porsche	0
	(Switzerland) Kessel Racing	Ferrari	0
	(China) Brothers Racing Team	Audi	0
	(Germany) GT Corse by Rinaldi	Ferrari	0
	(United Kingdom) Team Parker Racing	Audi	0
	(Portugal) Sports and You	Mercedes-Benz	0
	(Denmark) Insightracing with Flex-Box	Ferrari	0
	(Switzerland) Emil Frey Racing	Jaguar	0
	(France) Duqueine Engineering	Ferrari	0
	(Germany) Farnbacher Racing	Porsche	0
Teams ineligible for points
	(Belgium) NSC Motorsports	Lamborghini	0
	(Belgium) BMW Sports Trophy Team Marc VDS	BMW	0
	(Germany) Schütz Motorsport	Porsche	0
	(Germany) Callaway - RWT	Chevrolet	0
	(Germany) Zakspeed	Mercedes-Benz	0
	(United Kingdom) Trackspeed	Porsche	0
	(Czech Republic) ISR Racing	Audi	0
	(Germany) Prosperia ABT Racing	Audi	0
	(Germany) Vita4one Racing Team	BMW	0
	(France) SOFREV Auto Sport Promotion	Ferrari	0
	(United Kingdom) Generation Bentley Racing	Bentley	0
	(Switzerland) Fach Auto Tech	Porsche	0
	(Italy) GDL Motorsport	Mercedes-Benz	0
	(France) Delahaye Racing	Porsche	0
	(United Kingdom) Horse Power Racing	Aston Martin	0
	(Germany) Audi Racing Experience	Audi	0
	(United Kingdom) PGF-Kinfaun AMR	Aston Martin	0
	(Australia) Lago Racing	Lamborghini	0
	(New Zealand) Von Ryan Racing	McLaren	0
	(Russia) SMP Racing Russian Bears	Ferrari	0
	(Germany) Wochenspiegel Team Manthey	Porsche	0

== See also ==
- 2014 Blancpain Endurance Series
- 2014 Blancpain Sprint Series
