= 2021 GT World Challenge Europe =

2021 sports car racing series

The 2021 Fanatec GT World Challenge Europe Powered by AWS was the eighth season of GT World Challenge Europe. The season began at Monza on 18 April and ended at Barcelona on 10 October.
The season consisted of 10 events: 5 Sprint Cup events, and 5 Endurance Cup events. The season also had 2 Official Test Days.

== Calendar ==
The provisional calendar was released on 4 September 2020 with two unconfirmed rounds.
The calendar was updated on 23 October 2020, with the final calendar being released on 11 December 2020.
The Brands Hatch round was rescheduled from May to August.

Round	Race name	Circuit	Date	Series
1	(Italy) Pirelli 3 Hours of Monza 2021	Autodromo Nazionale Monza, Monza	16–18 April	Endurance
2	(France) Total French GT Sprint Series	Circuit de Nevers Magny-Cours, Magny-Cours	7–9 May	Sprint
3	(France) Circuit Paul Ricard 1000 km	Circuit Paul Ricard, Le Castellet	28–30 May	Endurance
4	(Netherlands) AWS Dutch GT Sprint Series	Circuit Park Zandvoort, Zandvoort	18–20 June	Sprint
5	(Italy) Pirelli Emilia-Romagna GT Sprint Series	Misano World Circuit Marco Simoncelli, Misano Adriatico	2–4 July	Sprint
6	(Belgium) Total 24 Hours of Spa 2021	Circuit de Spa-Francorchamps, Stavelot	29 July - 1 August	Endurance
7	(United Kingdom) Fanatec British GT Sprint Series	Brands Hatch, Kent	28–29 August	Sprint
8	(Germany) 3 Hours of Nürburgring 2021	Nürburgring, Nürburg	3–5 September	Endurance
9	(Spain) Pirelli Community of Valencia GT Sprint Series	Circuito Ricardo Tormo, Cheste	25–26 September	Sprint
10	(Spain) Blancpain Watch 3 Hours of Barcelona 2021	Circuit de Barcelona-Catalunya, Montmeló	8–10 October	Endurance

== Race results ==
Bold indicates overall winner.

Round		Circuit	Pole position	Pro Winners	Silver Winners	Pro/Am Winners	Am Winners
1		(Italy) Monza	(China) No. 63 Orange 1 FFF Racing Team	**(Italy) No. 54 Dinamic Motorsport**	(Switzerland) No.14 Emil Frey Racing	(United Kingdom) No.188 Garage 59	No Entries
1		(Italy) Monza	(Italy) Mirko Bortolotti (Italy) Andrea Caldarelli (Italy) Marco Mapelli	**(Austria) Klaus Bachler** **(Italy) Matteo Cairoli** **(Germany) Christian Engelhart**	(Switzerland) Alex Fontana (Switzerland) Ricardo Feller (Switzerland) Rolf Ineichen	(United Kingdom) Jonathan Adam (United Kingdom) Chris Goodwin (Sweden) Alexander West	No Entries
2	R1	(France) Magny-Cours	(Belgium) No. 32 Team WRT	**(Belgium) No. 32 Team WRT**	(Switzerland) No.14 Emil Frey Racing	(Italy) No. 52 AF Corse	No Entries
2	R1	(France) Magny-Cours	(Belgium) Dries Vanthoor (Belgium) Charles Weerts	**(Belgium) Dries Vanthoor** **(Belgium) Charles Weerts**	(Switzerland) Alex Fontana (France) Arthur Rougier	(Italy) Andrea Bertolini (Belgium) Louis Machiels	No Entries
2	R2	(France) Magny-Cours	(Germany) No. 6 Toksport WRT	**(Germany) No. 6 Toksport WRT**	(France) No. 87 AKKA ASP	(United Kingdom) No. 77 Barwell Motorsport	No Entries
2	R2	(France) Magny-Cours	(Germany) Maro Engel (Germany) Luca Stolz	**(Germany) Maro Engel** **(Germany) Luca Stolz**	(Russia) Konstantin Tereshchenko (France) Jim Pla	(Portugal) Henrique Chaves (Portugal) Miguel Ramos	No Entries
3		(France) Paul Ricard	(China) No. 63 Orange 1 FFF Racing Team	**(United Arab Emirates) No. 22 GPX Martini Racing**	(France) No. 87 AKKA ASP Team	(United Kingdom) No. 93 Sky - Tempesta Racing	No Entries
3		(France) Paul Ricard	(Italy) Mirko Bortolotti (Italy) Andrea Caldarelli (Italy) Marco Mapelli	**(New Zealand) Earl Bamber** **(Australia) Matt Campbell** **(France) Mathieu Jaminet**	(France) Thomas Drouet (France) Simon Gachet (Russia) Konstantin Tereshchenko	(Italy) Eddie Cheever III (United Kingdom) Chris Froggatt (Hong Kong) Jonathan Hui	No Entries
4	R1	(Netherlands) Zandvoort	(Switzerland) No. 14 Emil Frey Racing	(France) No. 88 AKKA ASP	(Switzerland) **No. 14 Emil Frey Racing**	(United Kingdom) No. 77 Barwell Motorsport	No Entries
4	R1	(Netherlands) Zandvoort	(Switzerland) Ricardo Feller (Switzerland) Alex Fontana	(Russia) Timur Boguslavskiy (Italy) Raffaele Marciello	**(Switzerland) Ricardo Feller** **(Switzerland) Alex Fontana**	(Portugal) Henrique Chaves (Portugal) Miguel Ramos	No Entries
4	R2	(Netherlands) Zandvoort	(France) No. 88 AKKA ASP	**(Switzerland) No. 163 Emil Frey Racing**	(Switzerland) No. 14 Emil Frey Racing	(Germany) No. 20 SPS Automotive Performance	No Entries
4	R2	(Netherlands) Zandvoort	(Russia) Timur Boguslavskiy (Italy) Raffaele Marciello	**(Spain) Albert Costa** **(Austria) Norbert Siedler**	(Switzerland) Ricardo Feller (Switzerland) Alex Fontana	(Austria) Dominik Baumann (Germany) Valentin Pierburg	No Entries
5	R1	(Italy) Misano	(Belgium) No. 32 Team WRT	**(Belgium) No. 32 Team WRT**	(France) No. 87 AKKA ASP	(United Kingdom) No. 77 Barwell Motorsport	No Entries
5	R1	(Italy) Misano	(Belgium) Dries Vanthoor (Belgium) Charles Weerts	**(Belgium) Dries Vanthoor** **(Belgium) Charles Weerts**	(France) Jim Pla (Russia) Konstantin Tereshchenko	(Portugal) Henrique Chaves (Portugal) Miguel Ramos	No Entries
5	R2	(Italy) Misano	(United Kingdom) No. 188 Garage 59	**(Belgium) No. 32 Team WRT**	(Belgium) No. 31 Team WRT	(United Kingdom) No. 188 Garage 59	No Entries
5	R2	(Italy) Misano	(United Kingdom) Jonathan Adam (Sweden) Alexander West	**(Belgium) Dries Vanthoor** **(Belgium) Charles Weerts**	(United Kingdom) Frank Bird (Japan) Ryuichiro Tomita	(United Kingdom) Jonathan Adam (Sweden) Alexander West	No Entries
6		(Belgium) Spa-Francorchamps	(France) No. 88 AKKA ASP	**(Italy) No. 51 Iron Lynx**	(Spain) No. 90 MadPanda Motorsport	(Italy) No. 53 AF Corse	(Switzerland) No. 166 T2 Racing
6		(Belgium) Spa-Francorchamps	(France) Jules Gounon (Spain) Daniel Juncadella (Italy) Raffaele Marciello	**(France) Côme Ledogar** **(Denmark) Nicklas Nielsen** **(Italy) Alessandro Pier Guidi**	(Netherlands) Rik Breukers (Finland) Patrick Kujala (Argentina) Ezequiel Pérez Companc (Mexico) Ricardo Sanchez	(United Kingdom) Duncan Cameron (Republic of Ireland) Matt Griffin (Italy) Rino Mastronardi (Spain) Miguel Molina	(Germany) Marc Basseng (Germany) Dennis Busch (Switzerland) Pieder Decurtins (Germany) Manuel Lauck
7	R1	(United Kingdom) Brands Hatch	(United Kingdom) No. 38 JOTA	**(Belgium) No. 32 Team WRT**	(Belgium) No. 31 Team WRT	(United Kingdom) No. 77 Barwell Motorsport	No Entries
7	R1	(United Kingdom) Brands Hatch	(United Kingdom) Ben Barnicoat (United Kingdom) Oliver Wilkinson	**(Belgium) Dries Vanthoor** **(Belgium) Charles Weerts**	(United Kingdom) Frank Bird (Japan) Ryuichiro Tomita	(Portugal) Henrique Chaves (Portugal) Miguel Ramos	No Entries
7	R2	(United Kingdom) Brands Hatch	(France) No. 88 AKKA ASP	**(Germany) No. 6 Toksport WRT**	(Germany) No. 7 Toksport WRT	(United Kingdom) No. 77 Barwell Motorsport	No Entries
7	R2	(United Kingdom) Brands Hatch	(Russia) Timur Boguslavskiy (Italy) Raffaele Marciello	**(Germany) Maro Engel** **(Germany) Luca Stolz**	(Finland) Juuso Puhakka (Colombia) Óscar Tunjo	(Portugal) Henrique Chaves (Portugal) Miguel Ramos	No Entries
8		(Germany) Nürburgring	(China) No. 63 Orange 1 FFF Racing Team	**(China) No. 63 Orange 1 FFF Racing Team**	(Switzerland) No. 14 Emil Frey Racing	**(China) No. 19 Orange 1 FFF Racing Team**	No Entries
8		(Germany) Nürburgring	(Italy) Mirko Bortolotti (Italy) Andrea Caldarelli (Italy) Marco Mapelli	**(Italy) Mirko Bortolotti** **(Italy) Andrea Caldarelli** **(Italy) Marco Mapelli**	(Switzerland) Ricardo Feller (Switzerland) Alex Fontana (Switzerland) Rolf Ineichen	(Italy) Stefano Costantini (Japan) Hiroshi Hamaguchi (United Kingdom) Phil Keen	No Entries
9	R1	(Spain) Valencia	(United Kingdom) No. 38 JOTA	**(Germany) No. 6 Toksport WRT**	(Germany) No. 99 Attempto Racing	(Italy) No. 52 AF Corse	No Entries
9	R1	(Spain) Valencia	(United Kingdom) Ben Barnicoat (United Kingdom) Oliver Wikinson	**(Germany) Maro Engel** **(Germany) Luca Stolz**	(Germany) Alex Aka (Germany) Dennis Marschall	(Italy) Andrea Bertolini (Belgium) Louis Machiels	No Entries
9	R2	(Spain) Valencia	(Germany) No. 6 Toksport WRT	**(Germany) No. 6 Toksport WRT**	(France) No. 87 AKKA ASP	(Germany) No. 20 SPS Automotive Performance	No Entries
9	R2	(Spain) Valencia	(Germany) Maro Engel (Germany) Luca Stolz	**(Germany) Maro Engel** **(Germany) Luca Stolz**	(France) Jim Pla (Russia) Konstantin Tereshchenko	(Austria) Dominik Baumann (Germany) Valentin Pierburg	No Entries
10		(Spain) Barcelona	(France) No. 88 AKKA ASP	**(France) No. 88 AKKA ASP**	(France) No. 87 AKKA ASP	(Germany) No. 20 SPS Automotive Performance	No Entries
10		(Spain) Barcelona	(Italy) Raffaele Marciello (Brazil) Felipe Fraga (France) Jules Gounon	**(Italy) Raffaele Marciello** **(Brazil) Felipe Fraga** **(France) Jules Gounon**	(France) Simon Gachet (France) Thomas Drouet (Russia) Konstantin Tereshchenko	(Austria) Dominik Baumann (Germany) Valentin Pierburg (Austria) Martin Konrad	No Entries

== Championship standings ==
Scoring system

Championship points are awarded for the first ten positions in each race. The pole-sitter also receives one point and entries are required to complete 75% of the winning car's race distance in order to be classified and earn points. Individual drivers are required to participate for a minimum of 25 minutes in order to earn championship points in any race.

Sprint Cup points

Position	1st	2nd	3rd	4th	5th	6th	7th	8th	9th	10th	Pole
Points	16.5	12	9.5	7.5	6	4.5	3	2	1	0.5	1

Endurance Cup points

Position	1st	2nd	3rd	4th	5th	6th	7th	8th	9th	10th	Pole
Points	25	18	15	12	10	8	6	4	2	1	1

Paul Ricard points

Position	1st	2nd	3rd	4th	5th	6th	7th	8th	9th	10th	Pole
Points	33	24	19	15	12	9	6	4	2	1	1

24 Hours of Spa points

Points are awarded after six hours, after twelve hours and at the finish.

Position	1st	2nd	3rd	4th	5th	6th	7th	8th	9th	10th	Pole
Points after 6hrs/12hrs	12	9	7	6	5	4	3	2	1	0	1
Points at the finish	25	18	15	12	10	8	6	4	2	1	1

=== Drivers' championships ===
==== Overall ====
Pos.	Drivers	Team	MNZ (Italy)	MAG (France)		LEC (France)	ZAN (Netherlands)		MIS (Italy)		SPA (Belgium)			BRH (United Kingdom)		NÜR (Germany)	VAL (Spain)		BAR (Spain)	Points
Pos.	Drivers	Team	MNZ (Italy)	MAG (France)		LEC (France)	ZAN (Netherlands)		MIS (Italy)		6hrs	12hrs	24hrs	BRH (United Kingdom)		NÜR (Germany)	VAL (Spain)		BAR (Spain)	Points
1	(Belgium) Dries Vanthoor (Belgium) Charles Weerts	(Belgium) Team WRT	Ret	1^{PF}	2	2	8	3	1^{P}	1^{F}	5	2	2	1	2	6	16	Ret	3	182.5
2	(Italy) Raffaele Marciello	(France) AKKA ASP	2	5	3	6	2	25^{P}	5	2	8	4	Ret^{P}	17	6^{P}	2	3	18	1	140.5
3	(Germany) Maro Engel (Germany) Luca Stolz	(Germany) HRT (Germany) Mercedes-AMG Team Toksport WRT	13	25	1^{PF}	38	7	Ret	2	24	16	15	36	2	1	3	1	1^{P}	5	120
4	(France) Jules Gounon	(France) AKKA ASP	2	10	24	6	13	6	12	7	8	4	Ret^{P}	12	3	2	5	2	1	114.5
5	(France) Côme Ledogar (Denmark) Nicklas Nielsen (Italy) Alessandro Pier Guidi	(Italy) Iron Lynx	5			5					1	1	1			7			7	83
6	(Italy) Mirko Bortolotti (Italy) Andrea Caldarelli (Italy) Marco Mapelli	(China) Orange 1 FFF Racing Team	24^{P}			3^{P}					2	10	8			1^{P}			4^{P}	73
7	(South Africa) Kelvin van der Linde	(Belgium) Team WRT	Ret	11	Ret	2			23	3	5	2	2							65.5
8	(Switzerland) Ricardo Feller	(Switzerland) Emil Frey Racing	3	2	26	13	1^{P}	2^{F}	8	11	14	38	31	14	8	8	17	12	20	64.5
9	(Switzerland) Alex Fontana	(Switzerland) Emil Frey Racing	3	3	8	13	1^{P}	2^{F}	8	11	14	38	31	14	8	8	17	12	20	64
10	(Russia) Timur Boguslavskiy	(France) AKKA ASP		5	3		2	25^{P}	5	2	26	14	10	17	6^{P}		3	18		62.5
11	(Spain) Albert Costa	(Switzerland) Emil Frey Racing	23	2	26	36	Ret^{F}	1	9	12	Ret	Ret	Ret	16	15	4	6	3	8	59.5
12	(Germany) Christian Engelhart	(Italy) Dinamic Motorsport	1	15	20	7	12	24	Ret	DNS	18	6	Ret			40	12	5	2	59
13	(Austria) Klaus Bachler (Italy) Matteo Cairoli	(Italy) Dinamic Motorsport	1			7					18	6	Ret			40			2	53
14	(Austria) Norbert Siedler	(Switzerland) Emil Frey Racing	23			36	Ret^{F}	1	9	12	Ret	Ret	Ret	16	15	4	6	3	8	47.5
15	(Brazil) Felipe Fraga	(France) AKKA ASP									26	14	10			2			1	44
16	(Netherlands) Robin Frijns	(Belgium) Belgian Club Audi Team WRT (Belgium) Audi Sport Team WRT									7	7	4			6	18	13	3	41
17	(Finland) Konsta Lappalainen	(Switzerland) Emil Frey Racing	Ret	12	9	37	15	4	7^{F}	5	Ret	Ret	Ret	8	20	5	9	Ret	6	38.5
18	(United Kingdom) Frank Bird (Japan) Ryuichiro Tomita	(Belgium) Team WRT	8	24	11	Ret	4	7	26	4	37	16	24	3	5	16	14	16	12	37.5
19	(Spain) Daniel Juncadella	(France) AKKA ASP	2			6					8	4	Ret^{P}							36
20	(Romania) Petru Umbrărescu	(France) AKKA ASP		10	24		13	6	12	7	40	34	23	12	3		5	2		35.5
21	(New Zealand) Earl Bamber (Australia) Matt Campbell (France) Mathieu Jaminet	(United Arab Emirates) GPX Martini Racing	Ret			1					10	46	Ret			37			10	35
22	(France) Arthur Rougier	(Switzerland) Emil Frey Racing	Ret	3	8	37					Ret	Ret	Ret	8	20	5	9	Ret	6	32.5
23	(United Kingdom) Ben Barnicoat (United Kingdom) Oliver Wilkinson	(United Kingdom) JOTA	Ret	17	4	16			22	8	4	9	7	28^{P}	DNS		22	4	13	32
24	(Germany) Christopher Haase	(France) Saintéloc Racing	Ret	Ret	10	15	11	16	3	Ret	17	11	6	10	10	41	2	10	24	31.5
25	(Italy) Antonio Fuoco (United Kingdom) Callum Ilott (Italy) Davide Rigon	(Italy) Iron Lynx	4^{F}			4					Ret	Ret	Ret			38			39	27
26	(Colombia) Óscar Tunjo	(Germany) Toksport	20	7	23	Ret	5	10	10	9	33	21	13	6	4	10	Ret	8	14	26
27	(United Kingdom) Jack Aitken	(Switzerland) Emil Frey Racing	Ret	12	9	37	15	4	7^{F}	5	Ret	Ret	Ret						6	25.5
28	(Germany) Nico Bastian	(Germany) GetSpeed (Germany) HRT	25			Ret					39	28	Ret			3			5	25
29	(Finland) Juuso Puhakka	(Germany) Toksport		7	23		5	10	10	9				6	4		Ret	8		25
30	(Russia) Konstantin Tereshchenko	(France) AKKA ASP	11	16	5	11	6	19	6	Ret	40	34	23	11	7	Ret	10	6	11	24
31	(France) Léo Roussel	(France) Saintéloc Racing		Ret	10		11	16	3	Ret				10	10		2	10		23.5
32	(France) Jim Pla	(France) AKKA ASP (Germany) GetSpeed		16	5		6	19	6	Ret	39	34	28	Ret	7	29	10	6	41	23
33	(France) Pierre-Alexandre Jean (Belgium) Ulysse De Pauw	(France) CMR		9	7		3	5	Ret	16	20	29	Ret	7	12		Ret	15		22.5
34	(Belgium) Frédéric Vervisch	(France) Saintéloc Racing	9	26	6	10	9	15	4	10				5	11	17				22.5
35	(United Kingdom) Ross Gunn (Denmark) Marco Sørensen (Denmark) Nicki Thiim	(United Kingdom) Garage 59 AMR									15	3	3							22
36	(France) Aurélien Panis	(France) Saintéloc Racing		26	6		9	15	4	10	45	30	29	5	11		13	9		20.5
37	(Netherlands) Rik Breukers (Argentina) Ezequiel Pérez Companc	(Spain) Madpanda Motorsport	Ret	4	13	24	Ret	9	14	14	9	13	11	4	16	21	Ret	7	23	20
38	(Switzerland) Rolf Ineichen	(Switzerland) Emil Frey Racing	3			13					14	38	31			8			20	19
39	(United Kingdom) Benjamin Goethe	(Belgium) Team WRT	6	11	Ret	19	16	18	23	3	47	25	22	18	9	13	18	13	18	18.5
40	(Denmark) Dennis Lind (Switzerland) Nico Müller	(Belgium) Audi Sport Team WRT									7	7	4							18
41	(Germany) Dennis Marschall	(Germany) Attempto Racing	15			18					29	5	9			9			15	16.5
42	(Italy) Giacomo Altoè	(Switzerland) Emil Frey Racing	23			36					Ret	Ret	Ret			4			8	16
43	(Italy) Mattia Drudi	(Germany) Attempto Racing	12	6	12	14^{F}	14	17			29	5	9	15	14	11	8	11	40	13.5
44	(United Kingdom) Rob Bell	(United Kingdom) JOTA	Ret			16					4	9	7						13	13
45	(Belgium) Maxime Martin (United Kingdom) Nick Tandy (Belgium) Laurens Vanthoor	(Hong Kong) KCMG									24	8	5							22
46	(Germany) Marcus Winkelhock	(France) Saintéloc Racing	9			10			15	15	17	11	6			17	13	9	9†	12
47	(Italy) Luca Ghiotto	(Switzerland) Emil Frey Racing														5				10
48	(Germany) Alex Aka	(Germany) Attempto Racing	15	19	18	18	17	12	13	Ret	28	23	15	13	13	9	4	24	15	9.5
49	(Chile) Benjamín Hites	(Germany) Rinaldi Racing	17	8	22	Ret	Ret	8	11	6	22	17	30	9	18	32			17	9.5
50	(France) Thomas Neubauer (Germany) Martin Tomczyk	(Germany) Walkenhorst Motorsport	32			9					3	49	Ret			15			Ret	9
50	(Germany) Timo Glock	(Germany) Walkenhorst Motorsport	32			9					3	49	Ret							9
51	(Germany) Christopher Mies	(Germany) Attempto Racing	12	19	18	14^{F}	10	11	Ret	17	29	5	9	18	9	11			40	8.5
52	(Finland) Patrick Kujala	(Germany) Rinaldi Racing (Spain) Madpanda Motorsport	17	8	22				11	6	9	13	11	9	18	32				8.5
53	(Switzerland) Patric Niederhauser	(France) Saintéloc Racing									17	11	6							8
53	(United Kingdom) Stuart Hall	(Belgium) Team WRT	6			19										13			18	8
53	(United Kingdom) James Pull	(Belgium) Team WRT	6			19					47	25	22			13			18	8
54	(Belgium) Adrien de Leener	(Italy) Dinamic Motorsport		15	20		12	24	Ret	DNS							12	5		6
55	(Canada) Mikaël Grenier (United States) Russell Ward	(United States) Winward Racing	7			20					21	51	Ret			24			29	6
55	(United Kingdom) Philip Ellis	(United States) Winward Racing	7			20					21	51	Ret							6
56	(Italy) Tommaso Mosca	(Germany) Attempto Racing	15	6	12		14	17												4.5
57	(Denmark) Michael Christensen (France) Frédéric Makowiecki (Norway) Dennis Olsen	(Germany) Schnabl Engineering									6	43	Ret							4
58	(United Kingdom) David Pittard (South Africa) Sheldon van der Linde (Germany) Marco Wittmann	(Germany) Walkenhorst Motorsport	26			8					11	48	Ret			12			21	4
58	(South Africa) Sheldon van der Linde (Germany) Marco Wittmann	(Germany) Walkenhorst Motorsport	26			8					11	48	Ret							4
58	(Denmark) Valdemar Eriksen	(Belgium) Team WRT	8			Ret					37	16	24			16			12	4
59	(United Kingdom) Finlay Hutchinson (Germany) Marcus Winkelhock	(France) Saintéloc Racing	9			10			15	15										3
60	(South Africa) David Perel	(Germany) Rinaldi Racing				Ret	Ret	8												2
61	(France) Romain Dumas (Denmark) Mikkel O. Pedersen (Italy) Andrea Rizzoli	(Italy) Dinamic Motorsport	10			12														1
62	(United Kingdom) Jonathan Adam (Sweden) Alexander West	(United Kingdom) Garage 59	14	22	21	25	23	21	21	18^{P}										1
63	(Germany) Jusuf Owega	(Germany) Attempto Racing					10	11												0.5
Pos.	Drivers	Team	MNZ (Italy)	MAG (France)		LEC (France)	ZAN (Netherlands)		MIS (Italy)		6hrs	12hrs	24hrs	BRH (United Kingdom)		NÜR (Germany)	VAL (Spain)		BAR (Spain)	Points
Pos.	Drivers	Team	MNZ (Italy)	MAG (France)		LEC (France)	ZAN (Netherlands)		MIS (Italy)		SPA (Belgium)			BRH (United Kingdom)		NÜR (Germany)	VAL (Spain)		BAR (Spain)	Points

Key
Colour	Result
Gold	Race winner
Silver	2nd place
Bronze	3rd place
Green	Points finish
Blue	Non-points finish
Blue	Non-classified finish (NC)
Purple	Did not finish (Ret)
Black	Disqualified (DSQ)
Black	Excluded (EX)
White	Did not start (DNS)
White	Race cancelled (C)
White	Withdrew (WD)
Blank	Did not participate

P – Pole
F – Fastest Lap
† – Invitational entry, no points scored

== See also ==
- 2021 GT World Challenge Europe Endurance Cup
- 2021 GT World Challenge Europe Sprint Cup
- 2021 GT World Challenge Asia
- 2021 GT World Challenge America
- 2021 GT World Challenge Australia
