= 2020 GT World Challenge Europe =

2020 sports car racing series

The 2020 GT World Challenge Europe Powered by AWS was the seventh season of the GT World Challenge Europe and the first after title sponsor Blancpain withdrew sponsorship. The season began on 25 July at Imola and ended on 15 November at Circuit Paul Ricard.

This season featured eight rounds: four Endurance Cup rounds and four Sprint Cup rounds.

== Calendar ==
The provisional calendar was released on 26 July 2019.

Round	Circuit	Date	Series
1	Autodromo Enzo e Dino Ferrari, Imola, Italy	25–26 July	Endurance
2	Misano World Circuit Marco Simoncelli, Misano Adriatico, Italy	8–9 August	Sprint
3	Nürburgring, Nürburg, Germany	5–6 September	Endurance
4	Circuit de Nevers Magny-Cours, Magny-Cours, France	12–13 September	Sprint
5	Circuit Zandvoort, Zandvoort, Netherlands	26–27 September	Sprint
6	Circuit de Barcelona-Catalunya, Montmeló, Spain	10–11 October	Sprint
7	Circuit de Spa-Francorchamps, Stavelot, Belgium	24–25 October	Endurance
8	Circuit Paul Ricard, Le Castellet, France	14–15 November	Endurance
Off due to the 2019-20 coronavirus pandemic
	Circuit	Original Date	Series
	Autodromo Nazionale Monza, Monza, Italy	18–19 April	Endurance
	(United Kingdom) Brands Hatch, Kent, Great Britain	2–3 May	Sprint
	(United Kingdom) Silverstone Circuit, Silverstone, Great Britain	9–10 May	Endurance
	Hungaroring, Mogyoród, Hungary	26–27 September	Sprint

== Race results ==
Bold indicates overall winner.

Round		Circuit	Pole position	Pro winners	Silver winners	Pro/Am winners	Am winners
1		(Italy) Imola	(Germany) No. 66 Attempto Racing	**(Belgium) No. 31 Belgian Audi Club Team WRT**	(United Kingdom) No. 78 Barwell Motorsport	(United Kingdom) No. 188 Garage 59	(France) No. 108 CMR
1		(Italy) Imola	(Italy) Mattia Drudi (Germany) Kim-Luis Schramm (Belgium) Frédéric Vervisch	**(Italy) Mirko Bortolotti** **(South Africa) Kelvin van der Linde** **(France) Matthieu Vaxiviere**	(Finland) Patrick Kujala (United Kingdom) Alex MacDowall (Denmark) Frederik Schandorff	(United Kingdom) Jonathan Adam (United Kingdom) Chris Goodwin (Sweden) Alexander West	(Belgium) Bernhard Delhez (France) Romano Ricci (France) Stéphane Tribaudini
2	R1	(Italy) Misano	(France) No. 15 Tech 1 Racing	**(Belgium) No. 32 Belgian Audi Club Team WRT**	(France) No. 26 Saintéloc Racing	(United Kingdom) No. 93 Sky - Tempesta Racing	Did not participate
2	R1	(Italy) Misano	(France) Thomas Neubauer (France) Aurélien Panis	**(Belgium) Dries Vanthoor** **(Belgium) Charles Weerts**	(France) Simon Gachet (France) Steven Palette	(Italy) Eddie Cheever (United Kingdom) Chris Froggatt	Did not participate
2	R2	(Italy) Misano	(France) No. 88 AKKA ASP Team	**(France) No. 88 AKKA ASP Team**	(France) No. 26 Saintéloc Racing	(Italy) No. 52 AF Corse	Did not participate
2	R2	(Italy) Misano	(Russia) Timur Boguslavskiy (Italy) Raffaele Marciello	**(Russia) Timur Boguslavskiy** **(Italy) Raffaele Marciello**	(France) Simon Gachet (France) Steven Palette	(Italy) Andrea Bertolini (Belgium) Louis Machiels	Did not participate
2	R3	(Italy) Misano	(France) No. 15 Tech 1 Racing	**(Belgium) No. 32 Belgian Audi Club Team WRT**	(Spain) No. 90 Madpanda Motorsport	(United Kingdom) No. 93 Sky - Tempesta Racing	Did not participate
2	R3	(Italy) Misano	(France) Thomas Neubauer (France) Aurélien Panis	**(Belgium) Dries Vanthoor** **(Belgium) Charles Weerts**	(Argentina) Ezequiel Pérez Companc (Zimbabwe) Axcil Jefferies	(Italy) Eddie Cheever (United Kingdom) Chris Froggatt	Did not participate
3		(Germany) Nürburgring	(United Arab Emirates) No. 40 GPX Racing	**(Italy) No. 54 Dinamic Motorsport**	(United Kingdom) No. 159 Garage 59	(China) No. 19 Orange1 FFF Racing Team	(France) No. 26 Saintéloc Racing
3		(Germany) Nürburgring	(France) Romain Dumas (Norway) Dennis Olsen (Austria) Thomas Preining	**(Italy) Matteo Cairoli** **(Germany) Christian Engelhart** **(Germany) Sven Müller**	(France) Valentin Hasse-Clot (United Kingdom) James Pull (United Kingdom) Andrew Watson	(Germany) Elia Erhart (Japan) Hiroshi Hamaguchi (United Kingdom) Phil Keen	(France) Michael Blanchemain (Belgium) Pierre-Yves Paque (Luxembourg) Clément Seyler
4	R1	(France) Magny-Cours	(Germany) No. 4 Haupt Racing Team	**(Germany) No. 4 Haupt Racing Team**	(Germany) No. 2 Toksport WRT	(United Kingdom) No. 92 Sky - Tempesta Racing	Did not participate
4	R1	(France) Magny-Cours	(Germany) Maro Engel (Germany) Luca Stolz	**(Germany) Maro Engel** **(Germany) Luca Stolz**	(Finland) Juuso Puhakka (Colombia) Óscar Tunjo	(Italy) Giancarlo Fisichella (Hong Kong) Jonathan Hui	Did not participate
4	R2	(France) Magny-Cours	(France) No. 26 Saintéloc Racing	(France) No. 88 AKKA ASP	**(France) No. 26 Saintéloc Racing**	(United Kingdom) No. 92 Sky - Tempesta Racing	Did not participate
4	R2	(France) Magny-Cours	(France) Simon Gachet (France) Steven Palette	(Russia) Timur Boguslavskiy (Italy) Raffaele Marciello	**(France) Simon Gachet** **(France) Steven Palette**	(Italy) Giancarlo Fisichella (Hong Kong) Jonathan Hui	Did not participate
5	R1	(Netherlands) Zandvoort	(Switzerland) No. 14 Emil Frey Racing	**(Belgium) No. 31 Belgian Audi Club Team WRT**	(France) No. 108 CMR	(United Kingdom) No. 93 Sky - Tempesta Racing	Did not participate
5	R1	(Netherlands) Zandvoort	(Canada) Mikaël Grenier (Austria) Norbert Siedler	**(South Africa) Kelvin van der Linde** **(Japan) Ryuichiro Tomita**	(France) Hugo Chevalier (France) Pierre-Alexandre Jean	(Italy) Eddie Cheever (United Kingdom) Chris Froggatt	Did not participate
5	R2	(Netherlands) Zandvoort	(Switzerland) No. 14 Emil Frey Racing	**(Switzerland) No. 163 Emil Frey Racing**	(France) No. 15 Tech 1 Racing	(United Kingdom) No. 93 Sky - Tempesta Racing	Did not participate
5	R2	(Netherlands) Zandvoort	(Canada) Mikaël Grenier (Austria) Norbert Siedler	**(Italy) Giacomo Altoè** **(Spain) Albert Costa**	(France) Thomas Neubauer (France) Aurélien Panis	(Italy) Eddie Cheever (United Kingdom) Chris Froggatt	Did not participate
6	R1	(Spain) Barcelona	(Switzerland) No. 14 Emil Frey Racing	**(Switzerland) No. 163 Emil Frey Racing**	(Switzerland) No. 14 Emil Frey Racing	(Italy) No. 52 AF Corse	Did not participate
6	R1	(Spain) Barcelona	(Switzerland) Ricardo Feller (Canada) Mikaël Grenier	**(Italy) Giacomo Altoè** **(Spain) Albert Costa**	(Switzerland) Ricardo Feller (Canada) Mikaël Grenier	(Italy) Andrea Bertolini (Belgium) Louis Machiels	Did not participate
6	R2	(Spain) Barcelona	(Switzerland) No. 163 Emil Frey Racing	**(Germany) No. 66 Attempto Racing**	(France) No. 89 AKKA ASP	(United Kingdom) No. 93 Sky - Tempesta Racing	Did not participate
6	R2	(Spain) Barcelona	(Italy) Giacomo Altoè (Spain) Albert Costa	**(Austria) Nicolas Schöll** **(Belgium) Frédéric Vervisch**	(Chile) Benjamín Hites (France) Jim Pla	(Italy) Eddie Cheever (United Kingdom) Chris Froggatt	Did not participate
6	R3	(Spain) Barcelona	(France) No. 88 AKKA ASP	**(France) No. 88 AKKA ASP**	(Switzerland) No. 14 Emil Frey Racing	(Italy) No. 52 AF Corse	Did not participate
6	R3	(Spain) Barcelona	(Russia) Timur Boguslavskiy (Italy) Raffaele Marciello	**(Russia) Timur Boguslavskiy** **(Italy) Raffaele Marciello**	(Switzerland) Ricardo Feller (Canada) Mikaël Grenier	(Italy) Andrea Bertolini (Belgium) Louis Machiels	Did not participate
7		(Belgium) Spa-Francorchamps	(France) No. 88 Mercedes-AMG Team AKKA ASP	**(Germany) No. 98 Rowe Racing**	(Germany) No. 5 Haupt Racing Team	(United Kingdom) No. 77 Barwell Motorsport	(France) No. 108 CMR
7		(Belgium) Spa-Francorchamps	(Russia) Timur Boguslavskiy (Brazil) Felipe Fraga (Italy) Raffaele Marciello	**(New Zealand) Earl Bamber** **(United Kingdom) Nick Tandy** **(Belgium) Laurens Vanthoor**	(Russia) Sergey Afanasyev (Italy) Michele Beretta (Germany) Hubert Haupt (Italy) Gabriele Piana	(United Kingdom) Ricky Collard (United Kingdom) Rob Collard (Russia) Leo Machitski (United Kingdom) Sandy Mitchell	(Belgium) Stéphane Lémeret (France) Clement Mateu (France) Romano Ricci (France) Stephane Tribaudini
8		(France) Paul Ricard	(Russia) No. 72 SMP Racing	**(Italy) No. 51 AF Corse**	(United Kingdom) No. 78 Barwell Motorsport	(United Kingdom) No. 188 Garage 59	(France) No. 108 CMR
8		(France) Paul Ricard	(Italy) Antonio Fuoco (Russia) Sergey Sirotkin (Finland) Toni Vilander	**(United Kingdom) Tom Blomqvist** **(France) Côme Ledogar** **(Italy) Alessandro Pier Guidi**	(Finland) Patrick Kujala (United Kingdom) Alex MacDowall (Denmark) Frederik Schandorff	(United Kingdom) Chris Goodwin (Germany) Marvin Kirchhöfer (Sweden) Alexander West	(France) Philippe Chatelet (France) Nicolas Misslin (France) Stephane Tribaudini

== Championship standings ==
Scoring system

Championship points are awarded for the first ten positions in each race. The pole-sitter also receives one point and entries are required to complete 75% of the winning car's race distance in order to be classified and earn points. Individual drivers are required to participate for a minimum of 25 minutes in order to earn championship points in any race.

Sprint Cup points

Position	1st	2nd	3rd	4th	5th	6th	7th	8th	9th	10th	Pole
Points	16.5	12	9.5	7.5	6	4.5	3	2	1	0.5	1

Imola points

Position	1st	2nd	3rd	4th	5th	6th	7th	8th	9th	10th	Pole
Points	25	18	15	12	10	8	6	4	2	1	1

Nürburgring & Paul Ricard points

Position	1st	2nd	3rd	4th	5th	6th	7th	8th	9th	10th	Pole
Points	33	24	19	15	12	9	6	4	2	1	1

24 Hours of Spa points

Points are awarded after six hours, after twelve hours and at the finish.

Position	1st	2nd	3rd	4th	5th	6th	7th	8th	9th	10th	Pole
Points after 6hrs/12hrs	12	9	7	6	5	4	3	2	1	0	1
Points at the finish	25	18	15	12	10	8	6	4	2	1	1

=== Drivers' championships ===
==== Overall ====
Pos.	Drivers	Team	IMO (Italy)	MIS (Italy)			NÜR (Germany)	MAG (France)		ZAN (Netherlands)		BAR (Spain)			SPA (Belgium)			LEC (France)	Points
Pos.	Drivers	Team	IMO (Italy)	MIS (Italy)			NÜR (Germany)	MAG (France)		ZAN (Netherlands)		BAR (Spain)			6hrs	12hrs	24hrs	LEC (France)	Points
1	(Russia) Timur Boguslavskiy	(France) AKKA ASP	3	9	1^{PF}	6	2	7	2	11	3	3	3	1^{P}				18	137
1	(Russia) Timur Boguslavskiy	(France) Mercedes-AMG Team AKKA ASP													1	37	Ret^{P}		137
2	(Belgium) Dries Vanthoor	(Belgium) Belgian Audi Club Team WRT	4	1	4	1^{F}	5	3	4	12	7	6	2	2				4^{F}	128
2	(Belgium) Dries Vanthoor	(Belgium) Audi Sport Team WRT													24	49	Ret		128
2	(Belgium) Charles Weerts	(Belgium) Belgian Audi Club Team WRT	4	1	4	1^{F}	5	3	4	12	7	6	2	2	54	54	Ret	4^{F}	128
3	(Italy) Raffaele Marciello	(France) AKKA ASP	3	9	1^{PF}	6	2	7	2			3	3	1^{P}				18	127.5
3	(Italy) Raffaele Marciello	(France) Mercedes-AMG Team AKKA ASP													1	37	Ret^{P}		127.5
4	(South Africa) Kelvin van der Linde	(Belgium) Belgian Audi Club Team WRT	1	2^{F}	5	7	4	5	6	1	11	7	4	4				5	118
4	(South Africa) Kelvin van der Linde	(Belgium) Audi Sport Team WRT													24	49	Ret		118
5	(Germany) Maro Engel (Germany) Luca Stolz	(Germany) Haupt Racing Team	15	4	2	4	3	1^{PF}	3			5	17	Ret				6	100
5	(Germany) Maro Engel (Germany) Luca Stolz	(Germany) Mercedes-AMG Team HRT													12	4	7		100
6	(Italy) Alessandro Pier Guidi	(Italy) AF Corse	7				Ret								4	1	5	1	79
7	(Germany) Christopher Haase	(France) Saintéloc Racing	5	5	3	2	10	9	5	Ret	2	14	5	Ret				12	74.5
7	(Germany) Christopher Haase	(France) Audi Sport Team Saintéloc Racing													15	8	6		74.5
8	(Spain) Albert Costa (Italy) Giacomo Altoè	(Switzerland) Emil Frey Racing	18	7	5	8	Ret	Ret	12	4	1	1	16^{PF}	5	6	11	31	8	66.5
9	(Japan) Ryuichiro Tomita	(Belgium) Belgian Audi Club Team WRT		2^{F}	5	7		5	6	1	11	7	4	4					66
10	(Australia) Matt Campbell (France) Mathieu Jaminet (France) Patrick Pilet	(United Arab Emirates) GPX Racing	2				Ret								3	6	4	2	65
11	(Brazil) Felipe Fraga	(France) AKKA ASP	3				2			11	3								61.5
11	(Brazil) Felipe Fraga	(France) Mercedes-AMG Team AKKA ASP													1	37	Ret^{P}		61.5
12	(Belgium) Frédéric Vervisch	(Germany) Attempto Racing	36^{PF}	6	17	16	Ret	4	Ret			8	1	16				9	56.5
12	(Belgium) Frédéric Vervisch	(Germany) Audi Sport Team Attempto Racing													5	10	2		56.5
13	(Italy) Matteo Cairoli (Germany) Christian Engelhart (Germany) Sven Müller	(Italy) Dinamic Motorsport	10				1								13	7	3	10	53
14	(France) Arthur Rougier	(France) Saintéloc Racing	24	5	3	2		9	5	Ret	2	14	5	Ret					52.5
15	(Italy) Mirko Bortolotti	(Belgium) Belgian Audi Club Team WRT	1				4											5	52
16	(Italy) Mattia Drudi	(Germany) Attempto Racing	36^{PF}	15	6	3	Ret	6	Ret	8	Ret	6						9	51
16	(Italy) Mattia Drudi	(Germany) Audi Sport Team Attempto Racing													5	10	2		51
17	(United Kingdom) James Calado (Denmark) Nicklas Nielsen	(Italy) AF Corse	7				Ret								4	1	5		46
18	(Canada) Mikaël Grenier	(Switzerland) Emil Frey Racing	11	10	Ret	7	Ret	2	7^{F}	16^{P}	10^{P}	2^{PF}	8	3^{F}	39	31	16	11	45.5
19	(France) Vincent Abril	(Germany) Haupt Racing Team	15				3											6	40
19	(France) Vincent Abril	(Germany) Mercedes-AMG Team HRT													12	4	7		40
20	(Germany) Christopher Mies	(Belgium) Belgian Audi Club Team WRT	4				5											4^{F}	39
20	(Germany) Christopher Mies	(Belgium) Audi Sport Team WRT													24	49	Ret		39
21	(Italy) Andrea Caldarelli (Denmark) Dennis Lind (Italy) Marco Mapelli	(China) Orange1 FFF Racing Team	Ret				16								2	2	38^{F}	3	37
22	(France) Steven Palette	(France) Saintéloc Racing		9	9	14		13	1^{P}	3	Ret	10	9	7	47	51	Ret		33.5
22	(France) Simon Gachet	(France) Saintéloc Racing		9	9	14		13	1^{P}	3	Ret	10	9	7					33.5
22	(France) Simon Gachet	(Germany) Attempto Racing													56	56	Ret		33.5
23	(New Zealand) Earl Bamber (United Kingdom) Nick Tandy (Belgium) Laurens Vanthoor	(Germany) Rowe Racing													9	3	1		33
24	(United Kingdom) Tom Blomqvist	(Taiwan) HubAuto Corsa													22	17	23		33
24	(United Kingdom) Tom Blomqvist	(Italy) AF Corse																1	33
24	(France) Côme Ledogar	(Italy) AF Corse																1	33
25	(Austria) Nicolas Schöll	(Germany) Attempto Racing	28	6	17	16	24	4	Ret	17	14	8	1	16	56	56	Ret	Ret	30.5
26	(France) Jules Gounon	(United States) Bentley K-PAX Racing	30				Ret								10	5	10	Ret	28.5
26	(France) Jules Gounon	(France) CMR		3	8	18		Ret	10	5^{F}	6	21	DNS	DNS					28.5
27	(Switzerland) Rolf Ineichen	(Belgium) Belgian Audi Club Team WRT					4			21	17							5	27
28	(France) Matthieu Vaxiviere	(Belgium) Belgian Audi Club Team WRT	1																25
28	(France) Matthieu Vaxiviere	(Belgium) Audi Sport Team WRT													29	21	14		25
29	(Italy) Tommaso Mosca	(Germany) Attempto Racing	28	15	6	3		6	Ret	8	Ret	8	Ret	6					25
30	(Switzerland) Ricardo Feller	(Switzerland) Emil Frey Racing	11				Ret					2^{PF}	8	3^{F}	39	31	16	11	24.5
31	(Switzerland) Patric Niederhauser	(Germany) Audi Sport Team Attempto Racing													5	10	2		23
32	(France) Nelson Panciatici	(France) CMR		3	8	18	15	Ret	10	5^{F}	6	21	DNS	DNS	49	41	33	Ret	22.5
33	(France) Dorian Boccolacci (Germany) Markus Winkelhock	(France) Saintéloc Racing	5				10											12	22
33	(France) Dorian Boccolacci (Germany) Markus Winkelhock	(France) Audi Sport Team Saintéloc Racing													15	8	6		22
34	(Austria) Norbert Siedler	(Switzerland) Emil Frey Racing	11	10	Ret	7	Ret	2	7^{F}	16^{P}	10^{P}				39	31	16	11	21
35	(France) Pierre-Alexandre Jean	(France) CMR	Ret	Ret	11	15	15	14	Ret	2	8	13	10	10	49	41	33	Ret	15
35	(France) Hugo Chevalier	(France) CMR		Ret	11	15		14	Ret	2	8	13	10	10					15
35	(France) Hugo Chevalier	(China) Orange1 FFF Racing Team													31	32	24		15
36	(South Africa) Jordan Pepper	(United States) Bentley K-PAX Racing	17				6								10	5	10	13	15
37	(France) Thomas Neubauer (France) Aurélien Panis	(France) Tech 1 Racing	19	Ret^{P}	15	19^{P}	39	Ret	18	7	4^{F}	12	19	8	28	43	Ret	16	14.5
38	(Chile) Benjamín Hites	(France) AKKA ASP	38	19	Ret	DNS	38	12	20	18	9	4	6	9	27	39	29	21	14
38	(France) Jim Pla	(France) AKKA ASP	Ret	19	Ret	DNS	21	12	20	18	9	4	6	9	53	42	Ret		14
39	(Finland) Juuso Puhakka	(Germany) Toksport WRT		WD	WD	WD		8	8	13	5	9	7	Ret					14
39	(Finland) Juuso Puhakka	(Spain) Madpanda Motorsport													41	34	26		14
39	(Colombia) Oscar Tunjo	(Germany) Toksport WRT		WD	WD	WD		8	8	13	5	9	7	Ret					14
40	(Spain) Andy Soucek	(United States) Bentley K-PAX Racing	17				6								30	16	12	13	9
40	(United Kingdom) Alex Buncombe	(United States) Bentley K-PAX Racing					6												9
41	(France) Julien Andlauer (Austria) Klaus Bachler (Germany) Dirk Werner	(Germany) Rowe Racing	6				WD								19	14	32		8
42	(Russia) Sergey Sirotkin	(Russia) SMP Racing	20				14								14	13	19	7^{P}	7
42	(Italy) Antonio Fuoco (Finland) Toni Vilander	(Russia) SMP Racing																7^{P}	7
43	(Norway) Dennis Olsen	(United Arab Emirates) GPX Racing					19^{PF}												6
43	(Norway) Dennis Olsen	(Germany) Frikadelli Racing Team													11	9	8		6
44	(Belgium) Maxime Soulet	(United States) Bentley K-PAX Racing	30				Ret								10	5	10	Ret	6
45	(Italy) Alessio Lorandi (Germany) Fabian Schiller	(Germany) GetSpeed Performance	39				7											15	6
45	(Germany) Maximilian Buhk	(Germany) GetSpeed Performance	39				7												6
45	(Germany) Maximilian Buhk	(France) AKKA ASP																18	6
46	(Argentina) Ezequiel Pérez Companc	(Spain) Madpanda Motorsport	22	16	12	9	17	17	11	6	15	18	11	13	41	34	26	25	5.5
46	(Zimbabwe) Axcil Jefferies	(Spain) Madpanda Motorsport		16	12	9		17	11	6	15	18	11	13					5.5
47	(United States) Dane Cameron (Germany) Mario Farnbacher (Netherlands) Renger van der Zande	(Italy) Team Honda Racing													7	12	9		5
48	(United Kingdom) Rob Bell (United Kingdom) Joe Osborne (United Kingdom) Ollie Wilkinson	(United Kingdom) Optimum Motorsport	8				11								51	46	Ret		5
49	(Germany) Jörg Bergmeister (France) Frédéric Makowiecki	(Germany) Frikadelli Racing Team													11	9	8		5
50	(France) Franck Perera	(Switzerland) Emil Frey Racing	18				Ret								6	11	31		4
51	(Australia) Josh Burdon (Switzerland) Alexandre Imperatori (Italy) Edoardo Liberati	(Hong Kong) KCMG					9								52	47	Ret		4
52	(France) Romain Dumas (Austria) Thomas Preining	(United Arab Emirates) GPX Racing	9				19^{PF}								11	15	11	Ret	3
53	(Germany) Kim-Luis Schramm	(Germany) Attempto Racing	36^{PF}				Ret											9	3
54	(Germany) Hamza Owega (Germany) Jusuf Owega	(Belgium) Belgian Audi Club Team WRT		18	10	10		10	9	15	Ret	15	12	11					2.5
55	(Denmark) Michael Christensen (France) Kévin Estre (Austria) Richard Lietz	(Hong Kong) KCMG													8	26	13		2
55	(Switzerland) Louis Delétraz	(United Arab Emirates) GPX Racing	9												11	15	11	Ret	2
56	(Italy) Eddie Cheever (United Kingdom) Chris Froggatt	(United Kingdom) Sky - Tempesta Racing	23	11	14	11	32	15	14	9	12	20	13	Ret	21	19	17	24	1
57	(United Kingdom) Phil Keen	(China) Orange1 FFF Racing Team	33				18								55	55	Ret	27	0.5
57	(United Kingdom) Phil Keen	(United Kingdom) ERC Sport		17	19	17		Ret	19	10	19	17	18	15					0.5
57	(United Kingdom) Lee Mowle	(United Kingdom) ERC Sport		17	19	17		Ret	19	10	19	17	18	15					0.5
Pos.	Drivers	Team	IMO (Italy)	MIS (Italy)			NÜR (Germany)	MAG (France)		ZAN (Netherlands)		BAR (Spain)			6hrs	12hrs	24hrs	LEC (France)	Points
Pos.	Drivers	Team	IMO (Italy)	MIS (Italy)			NÜR (Germany)	MAG (France)		ZAN (Netherlands)		BAR (Spain)			SPA (Belgium)			LEC (France)	Points

Key
Colour	Result
Gold	Race winner
Silver	2nd place
Bronze	3rd place
Green	Points finish
Blue	Non-points finish
Blue	Non-classified finish (NC)
Purple	Did not finish (Ret)
Black	Disqualified (DSQ)
Black	Excluded (EX)
White	Did not start (DNS)
White	Race cancelled (C)
White	Withdrew (WD)
Blank	Did not participate

P – Pole
F – Fastest Lap

==== Silver Cup ====
Pos.	Drivers	Team	IMO (Italy)	MIS (Italy)			NÜR (Germany)	MAG (France)		ZAN (Netherlands)		BAR (Spain)			SPA (Belgium)			LEC (France)	Points
Pos.	Drivers	Team	IMO (Italy)	MIS (Italy)			NÜR (Germany)	MAG (France)		ZAN (Netherlands)		BAR (Spain)			6hrs	12hrs	24hrs	LEC (France)	Points
1	(Argentina) Ezequiel Pérez Companc	(Spain) Madpanda Motorsport	22	16	12	9	17	17^{F}	11	6	15	18	11	13^{P}	41	34	26	25^{P}	122.5
2	(France) Simon Gachet	(France) Saintéloc Racing		9	9^{P}	14^{F}		13^{P}	1^{PF}	3	Ret	10	9	7					108.5
2	(France) Simon Gachet	(Germany) Attempto Racing													56	56	Ret		108.5
2	(France) Steven Palette	(France) Saintéloc Racing		9	9^{P}	14^{F}		13^{P}	1^{PF}	3	Ret	10	9	7					108.5
3	(Finland) Patrick Kujala (United Kingdom) Alex MacDowall (Denmark) Frederik Schandorff	(United Kingdom) Barwell Motorsport	12				13^{P}								18	23	36	14	108
4	(France) Thomas Neubauer (France) Aurélien Panis	(France) Tech 1 Racing	19^{P}	Ret^{PF}	15^{F}	19^{P}	39	Ret	18	7^{F}	4^{F}	12	19	8	28	43	Ret	16	104
5	(Chile) Benjamín Hites	(France) AKKA ASP	38	19	Ret	DNS	38^{F}	12	20	18^{P}	9	4	6	9	27	39	29^{P}	21	98.5
6	(France) Hugo Chevalier	(France) CMR		Ret	11	15		14	Ret	2	8	13	10	10					89.5
6	(France) Hugo Chevalier	(China) Orange1 FFF Racing Team													31	32	24		89.5
7	(Finland) Juuso Puhakka	(Germany) Toksport WRT		WD	WD	WD		8	8	13	5	9	7^{P}	Ret					85
7	(Finland) Juuso Puhakka	(Spain) Madpanda Motorsport													41	34	26		85
8	(Russia) Sergey Afanasyev (Germany) Hubert Haupt	(Germany) Haupt Racing Team	Ret				26								20	20	18	17	77
9	(Zimbabwe) Axcil Jefferies	(Spain) Madpanda Motorsport		16	12	9		17^{F}	11	6	15	18	11	13^{P}					72.5
10	(Germany) Hamza Owega (Germany) Jusuf Owega	(Belgium) Belgian Audi Club Team WRT		18	10	10		10	9	15	Ret	15	12	11					70
11	(Colombia) Óscar Tunjo	(Germany) Toksport WRT		WD	WD	WD		8	8	13	5	9	7^{P}	Ret					69
12	(France) Jim Pla	(France) AKKA ASP		19	Ret	DNS		12	20	18^{P}	9	4	6	9					66.5
13	(France) Pierre-Alexandre Jean	(France) CMR		Ret	11	15		14	Ret	2	8	13	10	10					65.5
14	(Italy) Michele Beretta	(Germany) Haupt Racing Team													20	20	18	17	65
15	(France) Valentin Hasse-Clot (United Kingdom) Andrew Watson	(United Kingdom) Garage 59	14				12								25	44	Ret	Ret	58
16	(Germany) Patrick Assenheimer	(Spain) Madpanda Motorsport	22				17								41	34	26	25^{P}	50
17	(Belgium) Baptiste Moulin	(China) Orange1 FFF Racing Team	21				28								31	32	24	26	47
18	(Italy) Gabriele Piana	(Germany) Haupt Racing Team													20	20	18		46
19	(France) Timothé Buret	(France) Tech 1 Racing	19^{P}				39								28	43	Ret	16	44
20	(Switzerland) Ricardo Feller (Canada) Mikaël Grenier	(Switzerland) Emil Frey Racing										2^{PF}	8^{F}	3^{F}					43.5
21	(United Kingdom) James Pull	(United Kingdom) Garage 59					12								25	44	Ret	Ret	40
22	(France) Florian Latorre	(China) Orange1 FFF Racing Team	21												31	32	24	26	38
23	(Netherlands) Rik Breukers	(United Kingdom) ROFGO Racing with WRT	32				Ret								34	35	34	19^{F}	34.5
23	(Netherlands) Rik Breukers	(United Kingdom) Belgian Audi Club Team WRT								21	17^{P}								34.5
24	(Switzerland) Lucas Légeret (Switzerland) Alex Fontana	(France) AKKA ASP	38				38^{F}								27	39	29^{P}	21	32
25	(Denmark) Benjamin Goethe (United Kingdom) Stuart Hall	(United Kingdom) ROFGO Racing with WRT	32				Ret								34	35	34	19^{F}	31
26	(Belgium) Adrien De Leener (Denmark) Mikkel O. Pedersen (Italy) Andrea Rizzoli	(Italy) Dinamic Motorsport	16				31								38	48	Ret	23	30
27	(Austria) Nicolas Schöll	(Germany) Attempto Racing	28^{F}				24			17	14				56	56	Ret	Ret	30
28	(United Kingdom) Taylor Proto	(China) Orange1 FFF Racing Team													31	32	24	26	28
29	(Netherlands) Indy Dontje (United Kingdom) Philip Ellis (United States) Russell Ward	(Germany) HTP Motorsport													36	27	21^{F}		27
30	(United Kingdom) Finlay Hutchison	(Germany) Haupt Racing Team	Ret																24
30	(United Kingdom) Finlay Hutchison	(Germany) Attempto Racing					24			17	14				56	56	Ret	Ret	24
31	(France) Romain Monti	(Spain) Madpanda Motorsport					17												23
31	(France) Romain Monti	(Germany) Toksport WRT								20	16								23
32	(United Kingdom) Frank Bird (Denmark) Nicolai Kjaergaard (United Kingdom) Euan McKay	(United Kingdom) Team Parker Racing	37				37								37	30	28	Ret	23
33	(Germany) Alex Aka	(Germany) Attempto Racing	28^{F}				24								56	56	Ret	Ret	21
34	(Mexico) Ricardo Sanchez	(Spain) Madpanda Motorsport													41	34	26		16
35	(Switzerland) Joël Camathias	(Germany) Haupt Racing Team					26												12
36	(Poland) Robin Rogalski	(Germany) Toksport WRT		Ret	WD	WD		Ret	16	20	16								10
37	(Italy) Andrea Amici	(China) Orange1 FFF Racing Team	21																10
38	(Venezuela) Jonathan Cecotto (United Kingdom) Ricky Collard	(China) Orange1 FFF Racing Team					28												9
39	(Spain) Jorge Cazebas	(Spain) Madpanda Motorsport	22																8
40	(Canada) Roman De Angelis	(United Kingdom) Garage 59													25	44	Ret		7
41	(Austria) Mick Wishofer	(Germany) Toksport WRT						Ret	16										6
42	(Italy) Tommaso Mosca	(Germany) Attempto Racing	28^{F}																6
43	(Switzerland) Rolf Ineichen	(Belgium) Belgian Audi Club WRT								21	17^{P}								3.5
Pos.	Drivers	Team	IMO (Italy)	MIS (Italy)			NÜR (Germany)	MAG (France)		ZAN (Netherlands)		BAR (Spain)			6hrs	12hrs	24hrs	LEC (France)	Points
Pos.	Drivers	Team	IMO (Italy)	MIS (Italy)			NÜR (Germany)	MAG (France)		ZAN (Netherlands)		BAR (Spain)			SPA (Belgium)			LEC (France)	Points

==== Pro-Am Cup ====
Pos.	Drivers	Team	IMO (Italy)	MIS (Italy)			NÜR (Germany)	MAG (France)		ZAN (Netherlands)		BAR (Spain)			SPA (Belgium)			LEC (France)	Points
Pos.	Drivers	Team	IMO (Italy)	MIS (Italy)			NÜR (Germany)	MAG (France)		ZAN (Netherlands)		BAR (Spain)			6hrs	12hrs	24hrs	LEC (France)	Points
1	(Italy) Eddie Cheever (United Kingdom) Chris Froggatt	(United Kingdom) Sky - Tempesta Racing	23^{P}	11	14^{PF}	11	32	15^{P}	14	9	12	20^{P}	13^{PF}	Ret^{P}	21	19	17	24^{P}	210
2	(Belgium) Louis Machiels	(Italy) AF Corse	26	13^{P}	13	13^{P}	23	18	15	16^{P}	13	16	15	12	32	29	35	Ret	155.5
2	(Italy) Andrea Bertolini	(Italy) AF Corse	26	13^{P}	13	13^{P}	23	18	15	16^{P}	13	16	15	12	32	29	35		155.5
3	(United Kingdom) Phil Keen	(China) Orange1 FFF Racing Team	33^{F}				18								55	55	Ret	27^{F}	126
3	(United Kingdom) Phil Keen	(United Kingdom) ERC Sport		17	19	17		Ret	19	10^{F}	19	17	18	15					126
4	(Germany) Valentin Pierburg	(Germany) SPS Automotive Performance		12^{F}	16	12^{F}		16	17	14	18^{PF}	19^{F}	14	14^{F}	45	36	27		115
5	(Hong Kong) Jonathan Hui	(United Kingdom) Sky - Tempesta Racing	23^{P}				32	11^{F}	13^{PF}						21	19	17	24^{P}	113
6	(Austria) Dominik Baumann	(Germany) SPS Automotive Performance		12^{F}	16	12^{F}		16	17			19^{F}	14	14^{F}	45	36	27		95
7	(United Kingdom) Chris Goodwin (Sweden) Alexander West	(United Kingdom) Garage 59	13				33								17	24	20	20	92
8	(United Kingdom) Rob Collard (Russia) Leo Machitski (United Kingdom) Sandy Mitchell	(United Kingdom) Barwell Motorsport	34				25								26	22	15^{F}	22	76
9	(United Kingdom) Lee Mowle	(United Kingdom) ERC Sport		17	19	17		Ret	19	10^{F}	19	17	18	15					74
10	(Italy) Giancarlo Fisichella	(United Kingdom) Sky - Tempesta Racing						11^{F}	13^{PF}						21	19	17		73
11	(United Kingdom) Jonathan Adam	(United Kingdom) Garage 59	13				33								17	24	20		59
12	(Japan) Hiroshi Hamaguchi	(China) Orange1 FFF Racing Team	33^{F}				18								55	55	Ret	27^{F}	52
13	(Germany) Elia Erhart	(China) Orange1 FFF Racing Team					18											27^{F}	48
14	(United Kingdom) Tom Onslow-Cole	(United Kingdom) Ram Racing	Ret				22								48	52	Ret	28	42
14	(United Kingdom) Tom Onslow-Cole	(Germany) SPS Automotive Performance		14	18	DNS													42
15	(United Kingdom) Ricky Collard	(United Kingdom) Barwell Motorsport													26	22	15^{F}		41
16	(Switzerland) Daniel Allemann (Germany) Ralf Bohn (Germany) Robert Renauer	(Germany) Precote Herberth Motorsport					20								35	28	37^{P}		38
17	(Netherlands) Niek Hommerson	(Italy) AF Corse	26				23								32	29	35		38
18	(Germany) Pierre Ehret (Germany) Daniel Keilwitz (Italy) Rino Mastronardi	(Germany) Rinaldi Racing	25				27								40	33	22	Ret	36
19	(Belgium) Maxime Martin	(United Kingdom) Garage 59													17	24	20		34
20	(Germany) Marvin Kirchhöfer	(United Kingdom) Garage 59																20	33
21	(Saudi Arabia) Karim Ojjeh (France) Gilles Vannelet	(Belgium) Boutsen Ginion Racing	27				Ret								33	25	25	Ret	29
22	(Netherlands) Remon Vos	(United Kingdom) Ram Racing	Ret				22								48	52	Ret	28	27
22	(Austria) Martin Konrad	(United Kingdom) Ram Racing					22								48	52	Ret	28	27
23	(France) Fabien Barthez (France) Jim Pla	(France) AKKA ASP	Ret				21^{PF}								53	42	Ret		21
23	(France) Thomas Drouet	(France) AKKA ASP					21^{PF}								53	42	Ret		21
24	(Germany) Jens Klingmann	(Belgium) Boutsen Ginion Racing													33	25	25	Ret	21
24	(Belgium) Benjamin Lessennes	(Belgium) Boutsen Ginion Racing													33	25	25		21
25	(Australia) Nick Foster	(Germany) SPS Automotive Performance								14	18^{PF}								20
26	(South Africa) David Perel	(Germany) Rinaldi Racing													40	33	22	Ret	18
27	(Germany) Christian Hook	(Germany) SPS Automotive Performance	Ret	14	18	DNS	30												17
27	(Germany) Christian Hook	(Germany) Rinaldi Racing																Ret	17
28	(Brazil) Daniel Serra	(Italy) AF Corse													32	29	35		16
29	(France) Michael Blanchemain (France) Arthur Rougier (Luxembourg) Clément Seyler	(France) Saintéloc Racing	24																15
30	(Germany) Alfred Renauer	(Germany) Precote Herberth Motorsport					34								35	28	37^{P}		14
31	(United States) Colin Braun (United States) George Kurtz	(Germany) SPS Automotive Performance													45	36	27		11
32	(United Kingdom) Nick Yelloly	(Belgium) Boutsen Ginion Racing	27																8
33	(Switzerland) Mauro Calamia (Switzerland) Ivan Jacoma (Italy) Roberto Pampanini	(Italy) Dinamic Motorsport	29																6
34	(France) Romano Ricci (France) Stéphane Tribaudini (Romania) Petru Umbrărescu	(France) CMR					29												4
35	(Austria) Christian Klien (Poland) Patryk Krupińsky (Austria) Mathias Lauda (Germany) Jens Liebhauser	(Poland) JP Motorsport													42	50	Ret		2
36	(Germany) Nico Bastian (Germany) Florian Scholze	(Germany) SPS Automotive Performance	Ret				30												2
37	(France) Jean-Luc Beaubelique	(France) AKKA ASP	Ret												53	42	Ret		1
Pos.	Drivers	Team	IMO (Italy)	MIS (Italy)			NÜR (Germany)	MAG (France)		ZAN (Netherlands)		BAR (Spain)			6hrs	12hrs	24hrs	LEC (France)	Points
Pos.	Drivers	Team	IMO (Italy)	MIS (Italy)			NÜR (Germany)	MAG (France)		ZAN (Netherlands)		BAR (Spain)			SPA (Belgium)			LEC (France)	Points

=== Team's championships ===
==== Overall ====
Pos.	Team	Manufacturer	IMO (Italy)	MIS (Italy)			NÜR (Germany)	MAG (France)		ZAN (Netherlands)		BAR (Spain)			SPA (Belgium)			LEC (France)	Points
Pos.	Team	Manufacturer	IMO (Italy)	MIS (Italy)			NÜR (Germany)	MAG (France)		ZAN (Netherlands)		BAR (Spain)			6hrs	12hrs	24hrs	LEC (France)	Points
1	(Belgium) Belgian Audi Club Team WRT (Belgium) Audi Sport Team WRT (United Kingdom) ROFGO Racing with WRT	Audi	1	1^{F}	4	1^{F}	4	3	4	1	7	6	2	2	24	21	14	4^{F}	164.5
2	(France) AKKA ASP (France) Mercedes-AMG Team AKKA ASP	Mercedes-AMG	3	8	1^{PF}	6	2	7	2	11	3	3	3	1^{P}	1	37	29^{P}	18	145.5
3	(France) Saintéloc Racing (France) Audi Sport Team Saintéloc Racing	Audi	5	5	3	2	10	9	1^{P}	3	2	10	5	7	15	8	6	12	115.5
4	(Germany) Haupt Racing Team (Germany) Mercedes-AMG Team HRT	Mercedes-AMG	15	4	2	4	3	1^{PF}	3			5	17	Ret	12	4	7	6	108.5
5	(Switzerland) Emil Frey Racing	Lamborghini	11	7	5	7	Ret	2	7^{F}	4^{P}	1^{P}	1^{PF}	8^{PF}	3^{F}	6	11	16	8	106.5
6	(Germany) Attempto Racing (Germany) Audi Sport Team Attempto Racing	Audi	28^{'P'F}	6	6	3	24	4	Ret	8	14	8	1	6	5	10	2	9	92
7	(Italy) AF Corse 51 (Russia) SMP Racing	Ferrari	7				14								4	1	5	1	80
8	(United Arab Emirates) GPX Racing	Porsche	2				19^{PF}								3	6	4	2	66
9	(Italy) Dinamic Motorsport	Porsche	10				1								13	7	3	10	59
10	(Germany) Rowe Racing	Porsche	6				8								9	3	1		45
11	(France) CMR	Bentley	31	3	8	15	15	14	10	2^{F}	6	13	10	10	46	38	30	29	42.5
12	(China) Orange1 FFF Racing Team	Lamborghini	21				16								2	2	24^{F}	3	37
13	(Germany) Toksport WRT	Mercedes-AMG		Ret	WD	WD		8	8	13	5	9	7	Ret					25.5
14	(United States) Bentley K-PAX Racing	Bentley	17				6								10	5	10	13	23
15	(France) Tech 1 Racing	Lexus	19	Ret^{P}	15	19^{P}	39	Ret	18	7	4^{F}	12	19	8	28	43	Ret	16	20.5
16	(Spain) Madpanda Motorsport	Mercedes-AMG	22	16	12	9	17	17	11	6	15	18	11	13	41	34	26	25	16
17	(United Kingdom) Sky - Tempesta Racing	Ferrari	23	11	14	11	32	11	13	9	12	20	13	Ret	21	19	17	24	16
18	(Hong Kong) KCMG	Porsche					9								8	26	13		11
19	(United Kingdom) Optimum Motorsport	McLaren	8				11								51	46	Ret		10
20	(Germany) GetSpeed Performance	Mercedes-AMG	39				7											15	9
21	(Italy) AF Corse 52	Ferrari	26	13	13	13	23	18	15	16	13	16	15	12	32	29	35	Ret	6
22	(Germany) SPS Automotive Performance	Mercedes-AMG	Ret	12	16	12	30	16	17	14	18	19	14	14	45	36	27		3.5
23	(United Kingdom) ERC Sport	Mercedes-AMG		17	19	17		Ret	19	10	19	17	18	15					1
23	(United Kingdom) Barwell Motorsport	Lamborghini	12				13								18	22	15	14	1
Pos.	Team	Manufacturer	IMO (Italy)	MIS (Italy)			NÜR (Germany)	MAG (France)		ZAN (Netherlands)		BAR (Spain)			6hrs	12hrs	24hrs	LEC (France)	Points
Pos.	Team	Manufacturer	IMO (Italy)	MIS (Italy)			NÜR (Germany)	MAG (France)		ZAN (Netherlands)		BAR (Spain)			SPA (Belgium)			LEC (France)	Points

==== Silver Cup ====
Pos.	Team	Manufacturer	IMO (Italy)	MIS (Italy)			NÜR (Germany)	MAG (France)		ZAN (Netherlands)		BAR (Spain)			SPA (Belgium)			LEC (France)	Points
Pos.	Team	Manufacturer	IMO (Italy)	MIS (Italy)			NÜR (Germany)	MAG (France)		ZAN (Netherlands)		BAR (Spain)			6hrs	12hrs	24hrs	LEC (France)	Points
1	(Spain) Madpanda Motorsport	Mercedes-AMG	22	16	12	9	17	17^{F}	11	6	15	18	11	13^{P}	41	34	26	25^{P}	126.5
2	(United Kingdom) Barwell Motorsport	Lamborghini	12				13^{P}								18	23	36	14	110
3	(France) Saintéloc Racing	Audi		9	9^{P}	14^{F}		13^{P}	1^{PF}	3	Ret	10	9	7					108.5
4	(Belgium) Belgian Audi Club Team WRT (United Kingdom) ROFGO Racing with WRT	Audi	32	18	10	10	Ret	10	9	15	17^{P}	15	12	11	34	35	34	19^{F}	108
5	(France) Tech 1 Racing	Lexus	19^{P}	Ret^{PF}	15^{F}	19^{P}	39	Ret	18	7^{F}	4^{F}	12	19	8	28	43	Ret	16	106.5
6	(France) AKKA ASP	Mercedes-AMG	38	19	Ret	DNS	38^{F}	12	20	18^{P}	9	4	6	9	27	39	29^{P}	21	103
7	(Germany) Haupt Racing Team	Mercedes-AMG	Ret				26								20	20	18	17	77
8	(Germany) Toksport WRT	Mercedes-AMG		Ret	WD	WD		8	8	13	5	9	7^{P}	Ret					69
9	(France) CMR	Bentley		Ret	11	15		14	Ret	2	8	13	10	10					65.5
10	(United Kingdom) Garage 59	Aston Martin	14				12								25	44	Ret	Ret	51
11	(China) Orange1 FFF Racing Team	Lamborghini	21				28								31	32	24	26	51
12	(Switzerland) Emil Frey Racing	Lamborghini										2^{PF}	8^{F}	3^{F}					43.5
13	(Italy) Dinamic Motorsport	Porsche	16				31								38	48	Ret	23	31
14	(Germany) Attempto Racing	Audi	28^{F}				24			17	14				56	56	Ret	Ret	30
15	(United Kingdom) Team Parker Racing	Bentley	37				37								37	30	28	Ret	27
Pos.	Team	Manufacturer	IMO (Italy)	MIS (Italy)			NÜR (Germany)	MAG (France)		ZAN (Netherlands)		BAR (Spain)			6hrs	12hrs	24hrs	LEC (France)	Points
Pos.	Team	Manufacturer	IMO (Italy)	MIS (Italy)			NÜR (Germany)	MAG (France)		ZAN (Netherlands)		BAR (Spain)			SPA (Belgium)			LEC (France)	Points

==== Pro-Am Cup ====
Pos.	Team	Manufacturer	IMO (Italy)	MIS (Italy)			NÜR (Germany)	MAG (France)		ZAN (Netherlands)		BAR (Spain)			SPA (Belgium)			LEC (France)	Points
Pos.	Team	Manufacturer	IMO (Italy)	MIS (Italy)			NÜR (Germany)	MAG (France)		ZAN (Netherlands)		BAR (Spain)			6hrs	12hrs	24hrs	LEC (France)	Points
1	(United Kingdom) Sky - Tempesta Racing	Ferrari	23^{P}	11	14^{PF}	11	32	11^{PF}	13^{PF}	9	12	20^{P}	13^{PF}	Ret^{P}	21	19	17	24^{P}	220
2	(Italy) AF Corse	Ferrari	26	13^{P}	13	13^{P}	23	18	15	16^{P}	13	16	15	12	32	29	35	Ret	160
3	(Germany) SPS Automotive Performance	Mercedes-AMG	Ret	12^{F}	16	12^{F}	30	16	17	14	18^{PF}	19^{F}	14	14^{F}	45	36	27		121.5
4	(United Kingdom) Garage 59	Aston Martin	13				33								17	24	20	20	92
5	(United Kingdom) ERC Sport	Mercedes-AMG		17	19	17		Ret	19	10^{F}	19	17	18	15					78.5
6	(United Kingdom) Barwell Motorsport	Lamborghini	34				25								26	22	15^{F}	22	76
7	(China) Orange1 FFF Racing Team	Lamborghini	33^{F}				18								55	55	Ret	27^{F}	52
8	(Germany) Precote Herberth Motorsport	Porsche					20								35	28	37^{P}		38
9	(Germany) Rinaldi Racing	Ferrari	25				27								40	33	22	Ret	36
10	(Belgium) Boutsen Ginion Racing	BMW	27				Ret								33	25	25	Ret	29
11	(United Kingdom) Ram Racing	Mercedes-AMG	Ret				22								48	52	Ret	28	27
12	(France) AKKA ASP	Mercedes-AMG	Ret				21^{PF}								53	42	Ret		21
13	(France) Saintéloc Racing	Audi	24																15
14	(Italy) Dinamic Motorsport	Porsche	29																6
15	(France) CMR	Bentley					29												4
16	(Poland) JP Motorsport	Mercedes-AMG													42	50	Ret		2
Pos.	Team	Manufacturer	IMO (Italy)	MIS (Italy)			NÜR (Germany)	MAG (France)		ZAN (Netherlands)		BAR (Spain)			6hrs	12hrs	24hrs	LEC (France)	Points
Pos.	Team	Manufacturer	IMO (Italy)	MIS (Italy)			NÜR (Germany)	MAG (France)		ZAN (Netherlands)		BAR (Spain)			SPA (Belgium)			LEC (France)	Points

== See also ==
- 2020 GT World Challenge Europe Endurance Cup
- 2020 GT World Challenge Europe Sprint Cup
- 2020 GT World Challenge America
- 2020 GT World Challenge Asia
