= GT World Challenge Europe =

Auto racing championship held in Europe

- GT World Challenge Europe logo since 2026
- Category: Sports car racing
- Region: Europe
- Affiliations: Intercontinental GT Challenge
- Inaugural season: 2014
- Classes: Pro • Gold • Silver • Bronze • Pro-Am (Note: The Pro-Am class is featured only at the 24 Hours of Spa. Teams and drivers entered are ineligible for points.)
- Manufacturers: Aston Martin • Audi • BMW • Chevrolet • Ferrari • Ford • Lamborghini • McLaren • Mercedes-AMG • Porsche
- Tyre suppliers: Pirelli
- Current champions: (Austria) Lucas Auer (Germany) Maro Engel
- Teams' champion: (Belgium) Team WRT
- Official website: gt-world-challenge-europe.com

GT World Challenge Europe (known as GT World Challenge Europe Powered by AWS for sponsorship reasons, formerly known as the Blancpain GT Series between 2014 and 2019, and as the Fanatec GT World Challenge Europe Powered by AWS between 2021 and 2024) is a sports car racing series organised by SRO Motorsports Group. It features grand-touring racing cars based on production road cars and compliant with the FIA's GT3 regulations. The series comprises two championships, the GT World Challenge Europe Sprint Cup and the GT World Challenge Europe Endurance Cup, each with five weekends. Each race meeting focuses on either the Sprint Cup or the Endurance Cup, as well as the overall championship.

The championship is divided into four classes: Pro, Gold, Silver, and Bronze. Pro cars have no driver restrictions and compete for the overall drivers' and teams' championships. Pro cars are limited to three drivers at the 24 Hours of Spa. Gold entries compete in the Gold Cup, consisting of Gold drivers and one Silver driver per car. Silver Cup cars are made up entirely of Silver-class drivers. Lastly, Bronze Cup entries have a maximum driver-quality line-up of a Platinum and a Bronze driver at Sprint rounds, with an additional Silver driver eligible for entry at Endurance rounds.

== History ==
Throughout its history, the racing series has utilised cars that comply with the FIA's GT3 regulations and has implemented a Balance of Performance (BoP) system to ensure competitive racing among different manufacturers. The series originated in 2011 and has evolved through several name changes and format modifications.

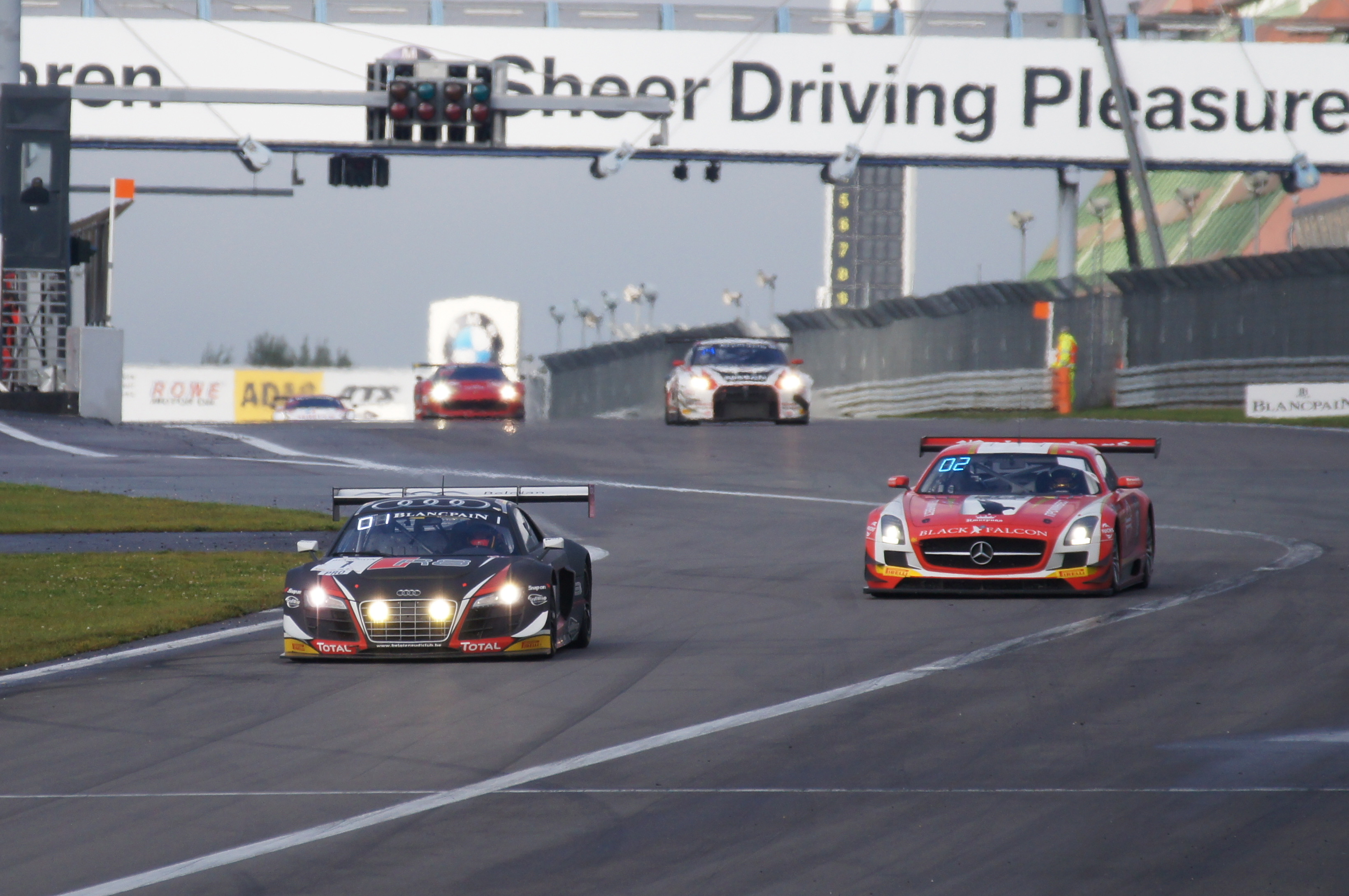
Laurens Vanthoor (left) during the Nürburgring round of the 2014 Blancpain GT Series, a race he would win on his way to the inaugural title.

Initially known as the Blancpain Endurance Series, the championship focused on long-distance GT3 races, with the 24 Hours of Spa as its premier event. This championship quickly attracted large fields of both professional and amateur drivers. In 2014, a sprint-format series was introduced alongside the endurance events, initially called the FIA GT Series and later renamed the Blancpain Sprint Series. This development created a comprehensive GT championship, culminating in a single overall title, with Laurens Vanthoor becoming the first champion.

In 2016, the Sprint and Endurance series were further integrated under the umbrella of the Blancpain GT Series, emphasising both the overall drivers' and manufacturers' titles. The individual events were renamed the Blancpain GT Series Sprint Cup and the Blancpain GT Series Endurance Cup, respectively. Additionally, 2016 marked the introduction of subsidiary championships: the Pro-Am and Am Cups, with Michał Broniszewski and Claudio Sdanewitsch crowned as the inaugural champions, respectively.

In 2018, the Silver Cup was introduced for young, silver-rated drivers, with Nico Bastian and Jack Manchester winning the inaugural title. It was also the final season for the Am Cup, which was won by Adrian Amstutz and Leo Machitski. In 2019, the sponsorship agreement between SRO and the Swiss watchmaker Blancpain ended, leading to the series being rebranded as the GT World Challenge Europe. This change aligned the European series with new GT World Challenge championships in Asia and America, forming a global platform for manufacturers to earn points across different regions.

A standard start formation of a GT World Challenge Europe race, led by the safety car, at Magny-Cours in 2022.

In 2020, Amazon Web Services (AWS) became the official presenter and global technology provider, and the series adopted the name GT World Challenge Powered by AWS. In 2021, Fanatec was introduced as an additional title sponsor, a partnership that will last until the end of the 2024 season. As of 2023, the championship consisted of five titles, following the introduction of the Gold and Bronze Cups alongside the overall title, Silver Cup, and Pro-Am Cup. Niklas Krütten and Calan Williams won the inaugural Gold Cup, while Alex Malykhin became the first winner of the Bronze Cup. Additionally, 2023 marked the final year of the Pro-Am Cup.

In 2023, it was announced that the winning car of the Bronze Cup would receive an automatic invitation to compete in the LMGT3 class of the 24 Hours of Le Mans. To earn this invitation, a team must compete in all 10 rounds of the combined Endurance and Sprint series. Pure Rxcing won in its first year, gaining entry to the 2024 24 Hours of Le Mans. As of 2026, the series maintained an even split between the Sprint and Endurance Cups, with each contributing to the overall championship title. The series also maintained capacity grid sizes, demonstrating its popularity; 2026 saw a record-breaking entry for the Sprint Cup with 45 cars.

== Format ==
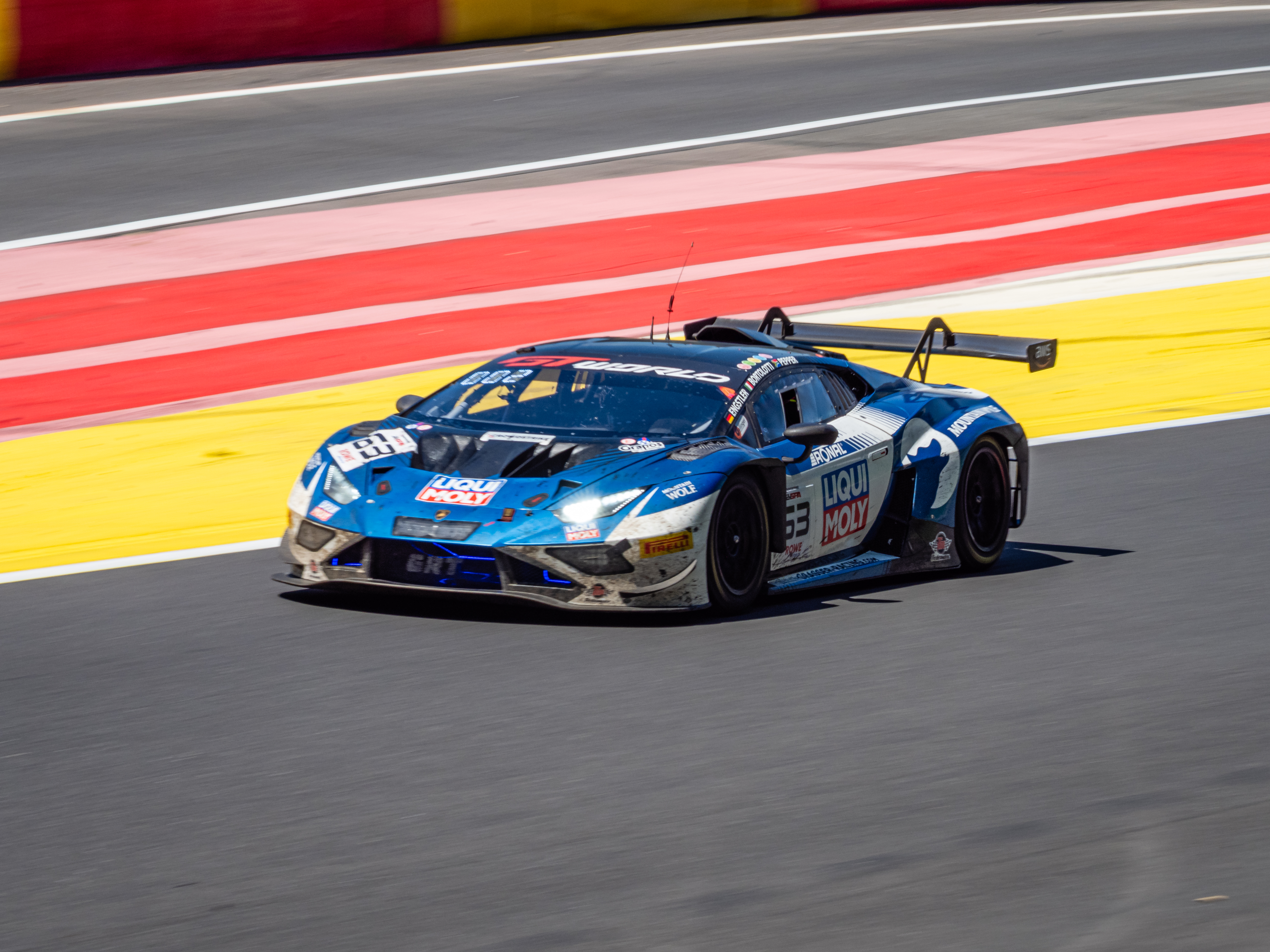
The No. 63 GRT – Grasser Racing Team Lamborghini won the 2025 24 Hours of Spa, and ran second at the 12-hour mark, scoring 34 points.

The GT World Challenge Europe is divided into two formats: the Endurance Cup and the Sprint Cup. Each format features an equal number of events, and together they contribute to the overall championship title. All races adhere to FIA GT3 regulations.

A typical race weekend begins with Free Practice 1 and Free Practice 2, which replaced Pre-Qualifying in 2026 to give drivers and teams more flexibility with setups. At Endurance Cup rounds, both FP1 and FP2 will run for 90 minutes. Despite the name change, FP2 may still be used to set the grid if qualifying cannot be run.

Qualifying, as it has since 2018, consists of three segments, one for each driver, with the aggregate time for each car establishing the grid. Due to growing grid sizes, the format was adjusted and split sessions were introduced for the Sprint Cup in 2025 and the Endurance Cup in 2026. The segments were split into two, with 10 minutes for the Silver and Bronze Cup cars (group A), and 10 minutes for the Pro and Gold Cup runners (group B). Q1A and Q1B will run back-to-back, followed by a five-minute break; the same format continues for Q2A and Q2B, and finally Q3A and Q3B.

The Endurance Cup consists of five rounds, with races typically lasting 3 or 6 hours. The highlight of the season is the prestigious 24 Hours of Spa, a single 24-hour race that awards the most points of the year. Each race is usually shared by three drivers, with a fourth available at Spa for cars not in the Pro class. The strategy for Endurance Cup races emphasises consistency, effective driver management, and careful pit stop planning. The Sprint Cup also features five rounds, with each event weekend comprising two one-hour races. In these races, cars are shared by two drivers. The races are fast-paced and intense, requiring a mandatory driver change during a designated time window.

Points from both the Sprint and Endurance Cups are combined to determine the overall champions for the GT World Challenge Europe for drivers and teams. Additionally, the series holds separate championships within each event for different classes based on driver ratings (Gold, Silver, Bronze), following an FIA driver categorisation system. Cars entered in the Pro "class" do not compete for a separate title; instead, they aim solely for the overall championship.

== Teams ==
Rather than committing to a single linear championship, teams in GT World Challenge Europe can enter three distinct titles: the Endurance Cup, the Sprint Cup, and the combined overall championship. A typical season will see more Endurance Cup–only entries, largely driven by the draw of competing in the 24 Hours of Spa. For instance, Rowe Racing has traditionally focused its efforts on the Endurance Cup. In contrast, Emil Frey Racing has recently chosen to compete solely in the Sprint Cup, while Team WRT has become synonymous with the combined championship. SRO established this modern teams' championship after unifying the Blancpain Endurance Series and the Blancpain Sprint Series into a single overarching entity in 2014. Furthermore, while teams operate privately, their performance feeds directly into a global GT World Challenge Manufacturers' Championship alongside entries in America, Asia, and Australia.

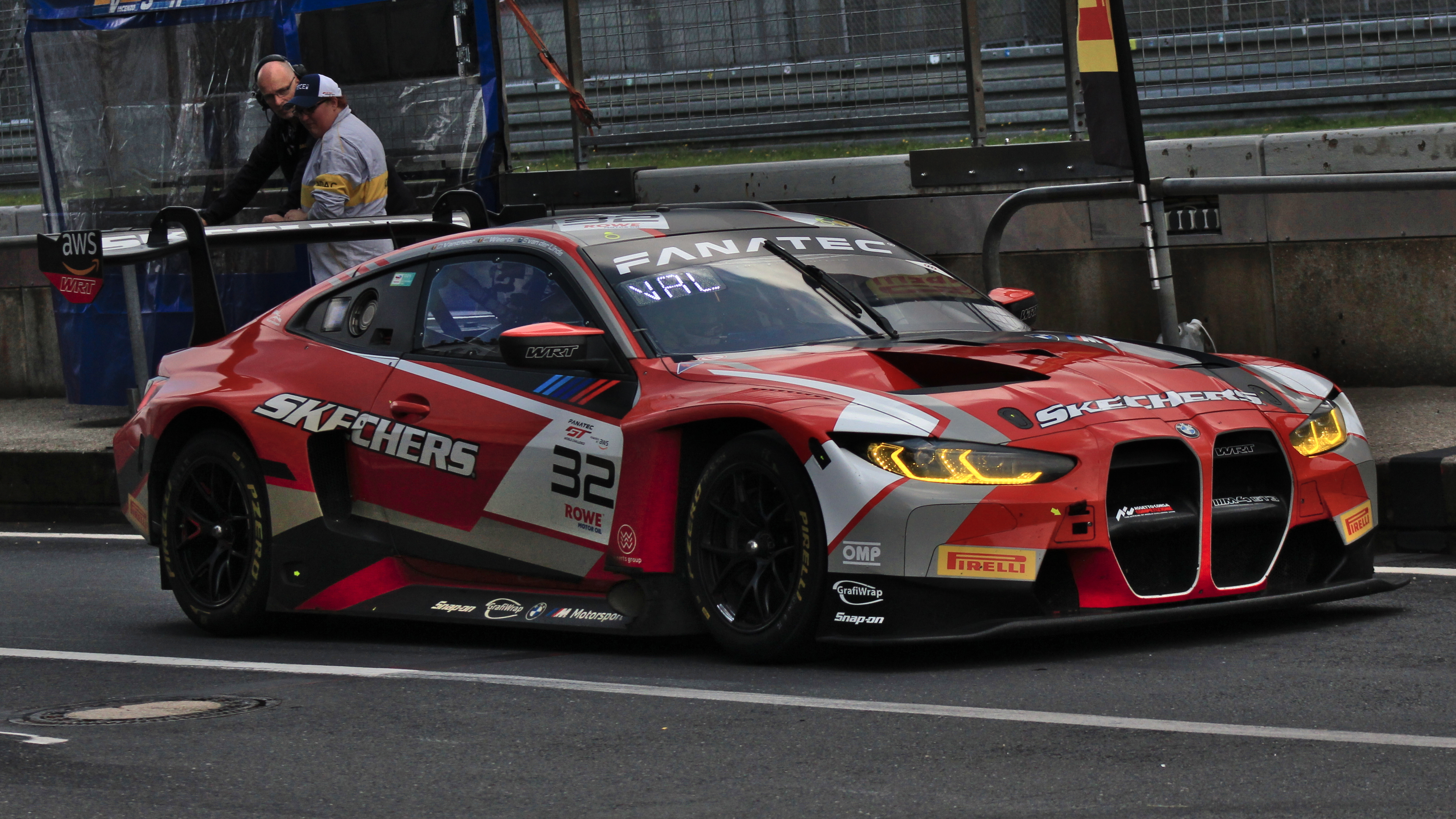
Team WRT are the most successful team in GT World Challenge Europe, securing six overall teams' championships over the series' twelve-year history.

Over the championship's history, Team WRT has been the most decorated team, claiming six overall championships out of a possible twelve: four with Audi and two with BMW. Akkodis ASP is the only other team to have won more than one overall championship, taking the title on three occasions, all with Mercedes-AMG. Other notable team entries include AF Corse, which has contested every year of the championship with Ferrari and secured multiple class championships; Boutsen VDS, which has won multiple titles across the Gold and Silver Cups; and Winward Racing, which won the 2024 and 2026 drivers' titles with Lucas Auer and Maro Engel.

Teams in GT World Challenge largely operate independently, even when sharing manufacturers, but can also assist one another. For example, Tempesta Racing has received technical support from AF Corse, GruppeM, HRT, Garage 59 and Herberth over the years. The Verstappen Racing car, owned by Max Verstappen, is run by sister team 2 Seas Motorsport as of 2026. Additionally, unlike other forms of sports car racing such as the FIA World Endurance Championship, SRO impose few restrictions on the number of cars a team can enter, ranging from one to six at times.

== Drivers ==
Unlike other forms of motorsport, particularly open-wheel series such as Formula One, driving duties in GT World Challenge Europe are highly fluid because of the series' multi-driver, customer racing format and scheduling conflicts with other sports car racing series. For instance, duties can range from full-season commitments to one-off appearances, particularly prevalent at the 24 Hours of Spa. Whilst some drivers are contracted to compete for a specific manufacturer as a factory driver, they can compete for various teams. This could mean splitting driving duties between two teams in the Sprint and Endurance Cups, respectively. In 2014, Audi works driver Stéphane Ortelli drove for Saintéloc Racing, G-Drive Racing and Team WRT across the year. Most drivers are not factory drivers and can therefore compete for multiple teams and manufacturers in a single season. During the 2026 season alone, Nicolas Baert competed in a Lionspeed GP Porsche, an HRT Ford and a Comtoyou Racing Aston Martin. Alternatively, commitments to other sports car racing series such as the FIA World Endurance Championship, DTM, or IMSA SportsCar Championship can keep drivers unavailable and adjust driver line-ups.

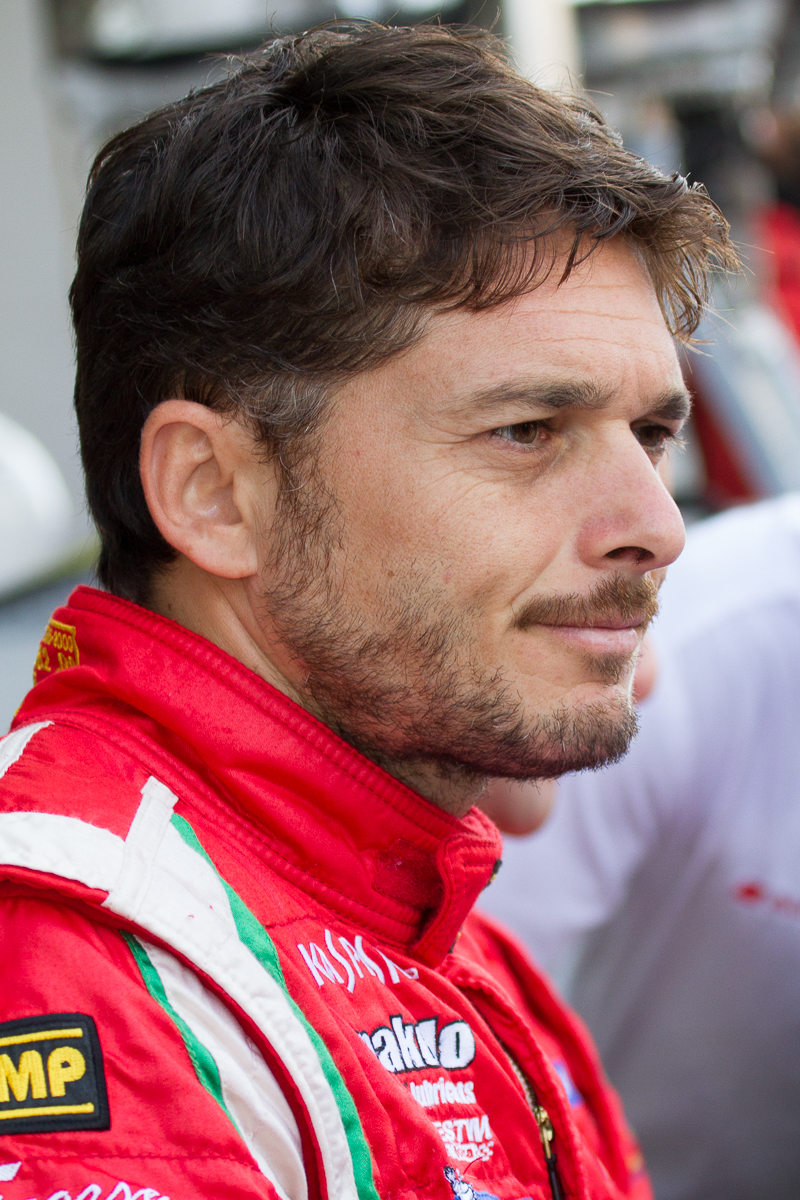
GT World Challenge Europe has attracted several Formula One drivers, including Giancarlo Fisichella (left) and Max Verstappen (right).

The FIA Driver Categorisation system evaluates drivers from Platinum to Bronze and balances them across teams and classes. As a result, driving skill and experience vary immensely across a GT World Challenge Europe field. For instance, a grid will typically include top-level professional drivers with Gold or Platinum licences and a wealth of success in various competitions. In recent years, grids have included several world-class drivers, such as current and ex-Formula One drivers like Giancarlo Fisichella and Max Verstappen, FIA World Endurance champions like Kévin Estre and Marcel Fässler, and 24 Hours of Le Mans winners. While these drivers bring fan engagement and attention to the series, Bronze-graded drivers generally provide the financial backing that makes the championship possible.

Raffaele Marciello is the championship's most decorated driver, with three overall drivers' championship titles for Mercedes-AMG. Timur Boguslavskiy, Charles Weerts, Lucas Auer and Maro Engel are the only other drivers to have won more than one drivers' title. Drivers from Germany have been most successful, with four titles in total. Whilst the series is European-based, it attracts drivers from all over the world. In 2025, South Africa's Kelvin van der Linde became the first non-European overall drivers' champion. After success in motorcycle racing, seven-time MotoGP champion Valentino Rossi made his competitive sports car debut in the 2022 GT World Challenge Europe, bringing the series international recognition. (Note: Valentino Rossi had previously made two starts in GT World Challenge Europe's predecessor, the Blancpain Endurance Series, in 2012.)

== Champions ==
=== Season results ===
==== Drivers ====
| Year | Overall | Gold Cup | Silver Cup | Bronze Cup | Pro-Am Cup | Am Cup |
|---|---|---|---|---|---|---|
| 2014 | (Belgium) Laurens Vanthoor | —N/a | —N/a | —N/a | —N/a | —N/a |
| 2015 | (Netherlands) Robin Frijns | —N/a | —N/a | —N/a | —N/a | —N/a |
| 2016 | (Austria) Dominik Baumann (Germany) Maximilian Buhk | —N/a | —N/a | —N/a | (Poland) Michał Broniszewski | (Germany) Claudio Sdanewitsch |
| 2017 | (Italy) Mirko Bortolotti (Germany) Christian Engelhart | —N/a | —N/a | —N/a | (Germany) Alexander Mattschull | (South Africa) David Perel |
| 2018 | (Italy) Raffaele Marciello | —N/a | (Germany) Nico Bastian (United Kingdom) Jack Manchester | —N/a | (France) Nyls Stievenart (Germany) Markus Winkelhock | (Switzerland) Adrian Amstutz (Russia) Leo Machitski |
| 2019 | (Italy) Andrea Caldarelli (Italy) Marco Mapelli | —N/a | (Germany) Nico Bastian (2) | —N/a | (Italy) Andrea Bertolini (Belgium) Louis Machiels | —N/a |
| 2020 | (Russia) Timur Boguslavskiy | —N/a | (Argentina) Ezequiel Pérez Companc | —N/a | (United Kingdom) Chris Froggatt (Italy) Eddie Cheever III | —N/a |
| 2021 | (Belgium) Dries Vanthoor (Belgium) Charles Weerts | —N/a | (Switzerland) Alex Fontana | —N/a | (Portugal) Henrique Chaves (Portugal) Miguel Ramos | —N/a |
| 2022 | (Switzerland) Raffaele Marciello (2) | —N/a | (Denmark) Benjamin Goethe (France) Thomas Neubauer | —N/a | (Portugal) Miguel Ramos (2) | —N/a |
| 2023 | Timur Boguslavskiy (2) (Switzerland) Raffaele Marciello (3) | (Germany) Niklas Krütten (Australia) Calan Williams | (Germany) Alex Aka (Italy) Lorenzo Patrese | (United Kingdom) Alex Malykhin | (Switzerland) Alex Fontana (Switzerland) Ivan Jacoma (Switzerland) Nicolas Leutwiler | —N/a |
| 2024 | (Austria) Lucas Auer (Germany) Maro Engel | (France) Paul Evrard (Belgium) Gilles Magnus | (France) César Gazeau (France) Aurélien Panis | (Italy) Eddie Cheever III (Hong Kong) Jonathan Hui | —N/a | —N/a |
| 2025 | (South Africa) Kelvin van der Linde (Belgium) Charles Weerts (2) | (United Kingdom) Chris Lulham (Netherlands) Thierry Vermeulen | (France) César Gazeau (2) (France) Aurélien Panis (2) | (United States) Dustin Blattner (Germany) Dennis Marschall | —N/a | —N/a |
| 2026 | (Austria) Lucas Auer (2) (Germany) Maro Engel (2) | (United Kingdom) Tom Fleming (Monaco) Louis Prette | (Belgium) Matisse Lismont (Argentina) Ignacio Montenegro | (Germany) Dennis Marschall (2) | —N/a | —N/a |

==== Teams ====
| Year | Overall | Gold Cup | Silver Cup | Bronze Cup | Pro-Am Cup | Am Cup |
|---|---|---|---|---|---|---|
| 2014 | (Belgium) Belgian Audi Club Team WRT | —N/a | —N/a | —N/a | —N/a | —N/a |
| 2015 | (Belgium) Belgian Audi Club Team WRT (2) | —N/a | —N/a | —N/a | —N/a | —N/a |
| 2016 | (Germany) HTP Motorsport | —N/a | —N/a | —N/a | (Switzerland) Kessel Racing | (Italy) AF Corse |
| 2017 | (Austria) GRT Grasser Racing Team | —N/a | —N/a | —N/a | (Germany) Rinaldi Racing | (Switzerland) Kessel Racing |
| 2018 | (France) AKKA ASP Team | —N/a | Not awarded | —N/a | (France) Saintéloc Racing | (United Kingdom) Barwell Motorsport |
| 2019 | (China) Orange1 FFF Racing Team | —N/a | (France) AKKA ASP Team | —N/a | (Italy) AF Corse | —N/a |
| 2020 | (Belgium) Belgian Audi Club Team WRT (3) | —N/a | (Spain) Madpanda Motorsport | —N/a | (United Kingdom) Sky - Tempesta Racing | —N/a |
| 2021 | (Belgium) Belgian Audi Club Team WRT (4) | —N/a | (Switzerland) Emil Frey Racing | —N/a | (United Kingdom) Barwell Motorsport | —N/a |
| 2022 | (France) AKKodis ASP Team (2) | —N/a | (Belgium) Team WRT | —N/a | (Italy) AF Corse (2) | —N/a |
| 2023 | (France) AKKodis ASP Team (3) | (Belgium) Boutsen VDS | (Germany) Tresor Attempto Racing | (Lithuania) Pure Rxcing | (Germany) Car Collection Motorsport | —N/a |
| 2024 | (Belgium) Team WRT (5) | (France) Saintéloc Racing | (Belgium) Boutsen VDS | (Germany) Rutronik Racing | —N/a | —N/a |
| 2025 | (Belgium) Team WRT (6) | (Belgium) Team WRT | (Belgium) Boutsen VDS (2) | (Switzerland) Kessel Racing | —N/a | —N/a |
| 2026 | (Belgium) Team WRT (7) | (Italy) AF Corse | (Belgium) Team WRT (2) | (Switzerland) Kessel Racing (2) | —N/a | —N/a |

=== Drivers' champion statistics ===
==== By season ====
GT World Challenge Europe overall drivers' champions by season
| Season | Driver(s) | Team | Manufacturer | | Tyres | Wins | Poles | Podiums | Points | Margin |
| Season | Driver(s) | Team | Chassis | Engine | Tyres | Wins | Poles | Podiums | Points | Margin |
|---|---|---|---|---|---|---|---|---|---|---|
| 2014 | (Belgium) Laurens Vanthoor | (Belgium) Belgian Audi Club Team WRT | (Germany) Audi R8 LMS Ultra | Audi DAR 5.2 L V10 | P | 7 | 5 | 10 | 200 | 10 |
| 2015 | (Netherlands) Robin Frijns | (Belgium) Belgian Audi Club Team WRT | (Germany) Audi R8 LMS Ultra | Audi DAR 5.2 L V10 | P | 5 | 2 | 9 | 170 | 12 |
| 2016 | (Austria) Dominik Baumann (Germany) Maximilian Buhk | (Germany) / HTP Motorsport; (Germany) / AMG - Team HTP Motorsport | (Germany) Mercedes-AMG GT3 | Mercedes-AMG M159 6.2 L V8 | P | 2 | 1 | 4 | 134 | 10 |
| 2017 | (Italy) Mirko Bortolotti (Germany) Christian Engelhart | (Austria) GRT Grasser Racing Team | (Italy) Lamborghini Huracán GT3 | Lamborghini DFJ 5.2 L V10 | P | 4 | 1 | 6 | 153 | 33 |
| 2018 | (Italy) Raffaele Marciello | (France) / AKKA ASP Team; (France) / Mercedes-AMG Team AKKA ASP | (Germany) Mercedes-AMG GT3 | Mercedes-AMG M159 6.2 L V8 | P | 2 | 2 | 8 | 164 | 36.5 |
| 2019 | (Italy) Andrea Caldarelli (Italy) Marco Mapelli | (China) Orange1 FFF Racing Team | (Italy) Lamborghini Huracán GT3 Evo | Lamborghini DGF 5.2 L V10 | P | 3 | 0 | 9 | 166.5 | 23 |
| 2020 | (Russia) Timur Boguslavskiy | (France) / AKKA ASP Team; (France) / Mercedes-AMG Team AKKA ASP | (Germany) Mercedes-AMG GT3 Evo | Mercedes-AMG M159 6.2 L V8 | P | 2 | 3 | 8 | 137 | 9 |
| 2021 | (Belgium) Dries Vanthoor (Belgium) Charles Weerts | (Belgium) Belgian Audi Club Team WRT | (Germany) Audi R8 LMS GT3 | Audi DAR 5.2 L V10 | P | 4 | 2 | 10 | 182.5 | 42 |
| 2022 | (Switzerland) Raffaele Marciello | (France) / AKKodis ASP Team; (France) / Mercedes-AMG Team AKKodis ASP | (Germany) Mercedes-AMG GT3 Evo | Mercedes-AMG M159 6.2 L V8 | P | 4 | 5 | 11 | 200.5 | 26 |
| 2023 | Timur Boguslavskiy (Switzerland) Raffaele Marciello | (France) AKKodis ASP Team | (Germany) Mercedes-AMG GT3 Evo | Mercedes-AMG M159 6.2 L V8 | P | 6 | 4 | 7 | 194.5 | 38 |
| 2024 | (Austria) Lucas Auer (Germany) Maro Engel | (United States) / Mercedes-AMG Team Mann-Filter; (United States) / Winward Racing Team Mann-Filter | (Germany) Mercedes-AMG GT3 Evo | Mercedes-AMG M159 6.2 L V8 | P | 4 | 1 | 9 | 155 | 2.5 |
| 2025 | (South Africa) Kelvin van der Linde (Belgium) Charles Weerts | (Belgium) Team WRT | (Germany) BMW M4 GT3 Evo | BMW P58 3.0 L Twin Turbo I6 | P | 3 | 1 | 7 | 151.5 | 3 |
| 2026 | (Austria) Lucas Auer (Germany) Maro Engel | (United States) / Mercedes-AMG Team Mann-Filter; (United States) / Winward Racing | (Germany) Mercedes-AMG GT3 Evo | Mercedes-AMG M159 6.2 L V8 | P | 0 | 1 | 6 | 131.5 | 11.5 |
| Season | Driver(s) | Team | Chassis | Engine | Tyres | Wins | Poles | Podiums | Points | Margin |
| Season | Driver(s) | Team | Manufacturer | | Tyres | Wins | Poles | Podiums | Points | Margin |

==== By driver ====
Drivers by number of GT World Challenge Europe drivers' championships won
| Driver | Titles | Season(s) |
|---|---|---|
| (Switzerland) Raffaele Marciello | 3 | 2018, 2022, 2023 |
| (Russia) Timur Boguslavskiy | 2 | 2020, 2023 |
| (Belgium) Charles Weerts | 2 | 2021, 2025 |
| (Austria) Lucas Auer | 2 | 2024, 2026 |
| (Germany) Maro Engel | 2 | 2024, 2026 |
| (Belgium) Laurens Vanthoor | 1 | 2014 |
| (Netherlands) Robin Frijns | 1 | 2015 |
| (Austria) Dominik Baumann | 1 | 2016 |
| (Germany) Maximilian Buhk | 1 | 2016 |
| (Italy) Mirko Bortolotti | 1 | 2017 |
| (Germany) Christian Engelhart | 1 | 2017 |
| (Italy) Andrea Caldarelli | 1 | 2019 |
| (Italy) Marco Mapelli | 1 | 2019 |
| (Belgium) Dries Vanthoor | 1 | 2021 |
| (South Africa) Kelvin van der Linde | 1 | 2025 |
| 15 drivers | | 21 titles |

==== By nationality ====
GT World Challenge Europe drivers' champions by nationality
| Country | Titles | Drivers | Seasons | By driver (titles) |
|---|---|---|---|---|
| Germany | 4 | 3 | 2016, 2017, 2024, 2026 | Maro Engel (2) |
| Germany | 4 | 3 | 2016, 2017, 2024, 2026 | Maximilian Buhk (1) |
| Germany | 4 | 3 | 2016, 2017, 2024, 2026 | Christian Engelhart (1) |
| Italy | 3 | 4 | 2017, 2018, 2019 | Mirko Bortolotti (1) |
| Italy | 3 | 4 | 2017, 2018, 2019 | Andrea Caldarelli (1) |
| Italy | 3 | 4 | 2017, 2018, 2019 | Marco Mapelli (1) |
| Italy | 3 | 4 | 2017, 2018, 2019 | Raffaele Marciello (1) (Note: Raffaele Marciello won the 2018 championship while representing Italy, and the 2022 and 2023 championships while representing Switzerland.) |
| Belgium | 3 | 3 | 2014, 2021, 2025 | Charles Weerts (2) |
| Belgium | 3 | 3 | 2014, 2021, 2025 | Dries Vanthoor (1) |
| Belgium | 3 | 3 | 2014, 2021, 2025 | Laurens Vanthoor (1) |
| Austria | 3 | 2 | 2016, 2024, 2026 | Lucas Auer (2) |
| Austria | 3 | 2 | 2016, 2024, 2026 | Dominik Baumann (1) |
| Switzerland | 2 | 1 | 2022, 2023 | Raffaele Marciello (2) |
| Netherlands | 1 | 1 | 2015 | Robin Frijns (1) |
| Russia | 1 | 1 | 2020 | Timur Boguslavskiy (1) (Note: Timur Boguslavskiy won the 2020 championship while representing Russia, and the 2023 championship while a neutral competitor, as Russian national emblems were banned by the FIA following the Russian invasion of Ukraine.) |
| South Africa | 1 | 1 | 2025 | Kelvin van der Linde (1) |
| 8 countries | 18 titles | 15 drivers | | |

== Circuits ==
- **Bold** denotes a circuit will be used in the 2027 season.

| Circuit | Location | Country | Last length used | Season(s) | Sprint/Endurance | Races held |
|---|---|---|---|---|---|---|
| Algarve International Circuit | Portimão | Portugal | 4.653 km (2.891 mi) | 2014–2015 | Sprint | 2 |
| Algarve International Circuit | Portimão | Portugal | 4.653 km (2.891 mi) | 2026 | Endurance | 1 |
| Baku World Challenge | Baku | Azerbaijan | 3.890 km (2.417 mi) | 2014 | Sprint | 1 |
| **Brands Hatch** | Kent | United Kingdom | 3.916 km (2.433 mi) | 2014–2019, 2021–2027 | Sprint | 12 |
| **Circuit de Barcelona-Catalunya** | Montmeló | Spain | 4.657 km (2.894 mi) | 2016, 2020, 2024, 2026 | Sprint | 4 |
| **Circuit de Barcelona-Catalunya** | Montmeló | Spain | 4.657 km (2.894 mi) | 2017–2019, 2021–2023, 2025, 2027 | Endurance | 7 |
| **Circuit de Nevers Magny-Cours** | Magny-Cours | France | 4.411 km (2.741 mi) | 2020–2022, 2024–2027 | Sprint | 6 |
| Circuit Ricardo Tormo | Cheste | Spain | 4.005 km (2.489 mi) | 2021–2023, 2025 | Sprint | 4 |
| **Circuit de Spa-Francorchamps** | Stavelot | Belgium | 7.004 km (4.352 mi) | 2014–2027 | Endurance | 13 |
| Circuit Paul Armagnac | Nogaro | France | 3.636 km (2.259 mi) | 2014–2015 | Sprint | 2 |
| **Circuit Paul Ricard** | Le Castellet | France | 5.770 km (3.585 mi) | 2014–2027 | Endurance | 13 |
| **Circuit Zandvoort** | Zandvoort | Netherlands | 4.259 km (2.646 mi) | 2014–2015, 2019–2023, 2025–2027 | Sprint | 9 |
| Circuit Zolder | Heusden-Zolder | Belgium | 4.010 km (2.492 mi) | 2014–2015, 2017–2018 | Sprint | 4 |
| Hockenheimring | Hockenheim | Germany | 4.574 km (2.842 mi) | 2022 | Endurance | 1 |
| Hockenheimring | Hockenheim | Germany | 4.574 km (2.842 mi) | 2023–2024 | Sprint | 2 |
| **Hungaroring** | Mogyoród | Hungary | 4.381 km (2.722 mi) | 2016–2019, 2027 | Sprint | 4 |
| **Imola Circuit** | Imola | Italy | 4.909 km (3.050 mi) | 2020, 2022, 2027 | Endurance | 2 |
| Jeddah Corniche Circuit | Jeddah | Saudi Arabia | 6.174 km (3.836 mi) | 2024 | Endurance | 1 |
| **Misano World Circuit** | Misano Adriatico | Italy | 4.266 km (2.651 mi) | 2015–2027 | Sprint | 12 |
| Monza Circuit | Monza | Italy | 5.793 km (3.600 mi) | 2014–2019, 2021, 2023–2026 | Endurance | 11 |
| Moscow Raceway | Volokolamsk | Russia | 3.955 km (2.458 mi) | 2015 | Sprint | 1 |
| **Nürburgring** | Nürburg | Germany | 5.148 km (3.199 mi) | 2014–2015, 2020–2021, 2023–2027 | Endurance | 8 |
| **Nürburgring** | Nürburg | Germany | 5.148 km (3.199 mi) | 2016–2019 | Sprint | 4 |
| Silverstone Circuit | Silverstone | United Kingdom | 5.891 km (3.660 mi) | 2014–2019 | Endurance | 6 |
| Slovakia Ring | Orechová Potôň | Slovakia | 5.922 km (3.680 mi) | 2014 | Sprint | 1 |

== See also ==
- Intercontinental GT Challenge
- GT World Challenge Europe Endurance Cup
- GT World Challenge Europe Sprint Cup
- GT World Challenge Asia
- GT World Challenge America
- GT World Challenge Australia
- British GT Championship
- Japan Cup
- GT America
- GT3 Revival Series
