= PHX (disambiguation) =

PHX is the IATA code for, and most often refers to, Phoenix Sky Harbor International Airport. It may also refer to:

- Scherer Sport PHX, a German auto racing team
- Phoenix, Arizona, where PHX is located
  - Phoenix Suns, the city's National Basketball Association team
