= Laurens Vanthoor =

Belgian racing driver

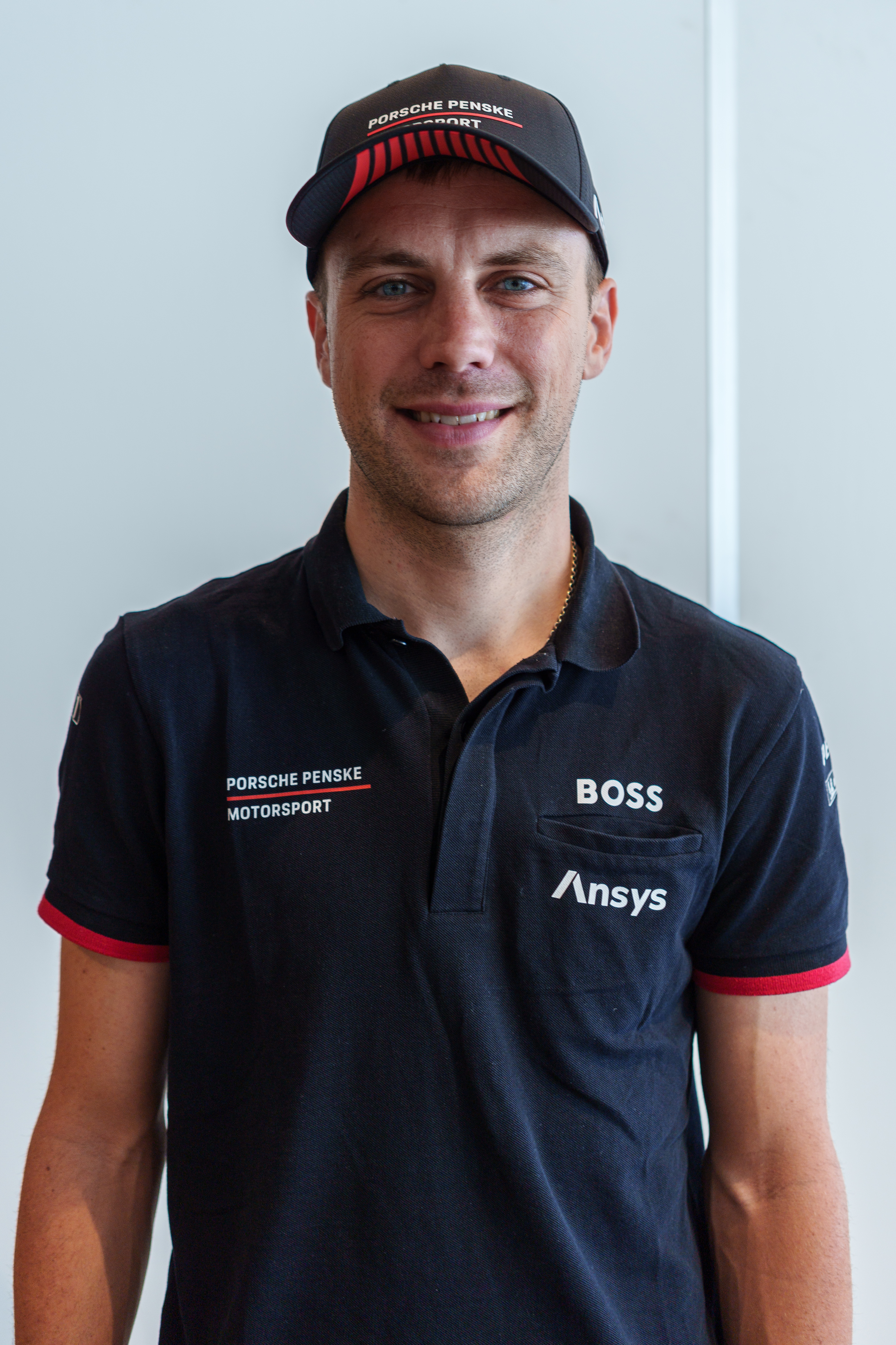
- Vanthoor in 2024
- Nationality: Belgian
- Born: 8 May 1991 (age 35) Hasselt, Belgium
- Relatives: Dries Vanthoor (brother)

WEC career
- Debut season: 2015
- Current team: Porsche Penske Motorsport
- Categorisation: FIA Platinum
- Car number: 6
- Former teams: Porsche GT Team, OAK Racing
- Starts: 28
- Wins: 4
- Poles: 1
- Fastest laps: 0
- Best finish: 1st in 2024

Previous series
- 2009 2008–09 2010–11 2012–2016 2012–2016 2016: Belgian Touring Car Series; German Formula Three; Formula 3 Euro Series; Blancpain GT Series Endurance Cup; Blancpain GT Series Sprint Cup; Intercontinental GT Challenge

Championship titles
- 2024 2021 2019 2016 2014 2014 2013 2009: FIA World Endurance Championship - Hypercar; IMSA SportsCar Championship - GTD; IMSA SportsCar Championship - GTLM; Intercontinental GT Challenge; Blancpain GT Series Endurance Cup; Blancpain GT Series; FIA GT Series; German Formula Three

Laurens Vanthoor (Dutch pronunciation: [ˈlʌurəns fɑnˈtoːr]; (Note: In isolation, Vanthoor is pronounced [vɑnˈtoːr].) born 8 May 1991) is a Belgian professional racing driver who competes in the IMSA SportsCar Championship for Porsche Penske Motorsport. Vanthoor won the 2024 FIA World Endurance Championship title for Porsche in the Hypercar class alongside Kévin Estre and André Lotterer. He previously achieved multiple GT3 victories for Audi.

Laurens is the older brother of BMW factory driver Dries Vanthoor.

== Early career ==
=== Karting ===
Born in Hasselt, Vanthoor began his kart racing career at an early age. In 2005 he became French and Belgian Champion in the ICA-J class and he also finished fourth in the European Championship.

In 2007, Vanthoor become an official factory driver for the CRG racing team in the KF2 category. He ended up being out of action for five months out due to an accident, resulting in six fractures. His best result in the season was a runner-up position in the North European Championship.

=== 2008–2011: Formula Three ===
Vanthoor began his formula racing career in the 2008 German Formula Three season, jumping from karting directly into Formula Three. He finished fourth overall in the championship, with two wins and three poles. Following his successes, the Belgian Automobile Club (RACB) made him a member of their "National Team" initiative and Volkswagen Motorsport made him an official driver. Vanthoor also became the youngest driver ever in the history of the Macau Grand Prix and he finished in sixth position.

With Frédéric Vervisch and Sebastián Saavedra both moving Stateside and Johnny Cecotto Jr. moving up to the F3 Euroseries and GP2, Vanthoor became the main title contender for the 2009 season. Vanthoor followed Vervisch's lead of 2008 by dominating the field, wrapping up the title at the Nürburgring.

Vanthoor moved into the Formula Three Euroseries for the 2010 season with Signature and stayed with the team for the 2011 season. He scored several podium finishes but never won a race.

== Sportscar career ==
=== 2012: FIA GT1 ===
In 2012, Vanthoor switched to the FIA GT1 World Championship with WRT. Together with Stéphane Ortelli, he won both the qualifying and championship races at the first round at Nogaro.

=== 2013–2016: Audi Sport Factory Driver ===
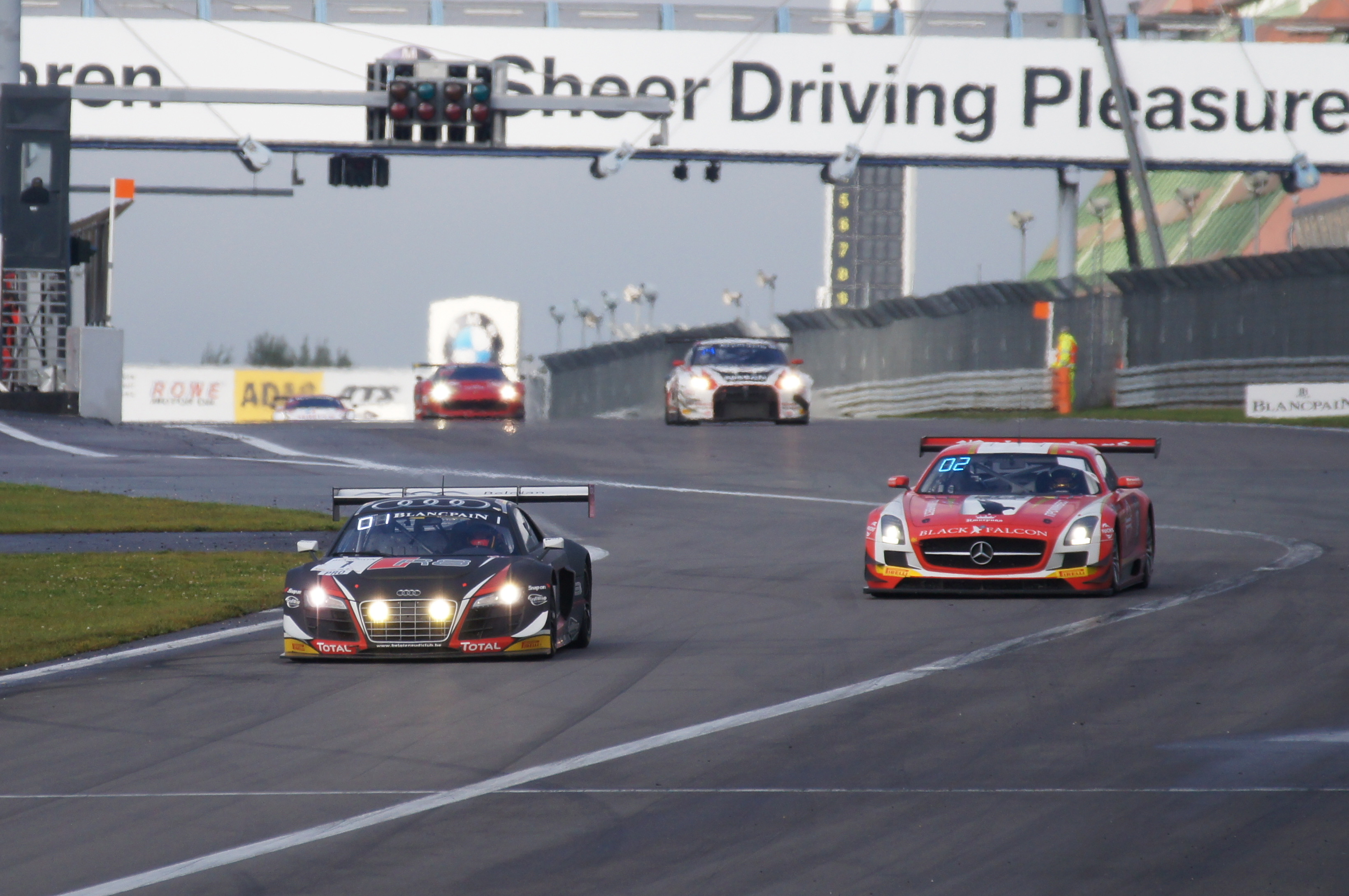
Audi R8 LMS Ultra from W Racing Team during the 2014 Blancpain Endurance Series round at the Nürburgring

In 2013, Vanthoor won the FIA GT Series together with Ortelli for Audi and WRT. In 2014 he competed in the Blancpain Sprint Series and Blancpain Endurance Series, winning the latter as well as the overall Blancpain GT Series. He also won the 2014 24 Hours of Spa for WRT together with fellow Audi Sport factory drivers René Rast and Markus Winkelhock.

In 2015, Vanthoor started his season in the Bathurst 12 Hour with Phoenix Racing. He took the pole with a new lap record and ended second. He also drove in Brazil for the 1st round of the Stock Car Brasil together with Valdeno Brito for Shell Racing at Goiania. Together with Belgian Audi Club Team WRT, he won the 24 Hours of Nürburgring in the new Audi R8 LMS 2015 specification. On 3 October, during the event at Misano for the Blancpain Sprint Series, he was involved in a major crash which led to a serious injury. Therefore, he missed the last race of the season as well as the race at Macau, where he was replaced by René Rast. He made his comeback at the Sepang 12 Hours, which he won with Stéphane Ortelli and Stuart Leonard.

In 2016, Vanthoor started his season with a win in the Dubai 24 Hour with Belgian Audi Club Team WRT. On 21 November 2016 Vanthoor won the FIA GT World Cup, crowning himself as World Champion on the streets of Macau. On 3 December 2016, it was announced that Vanthoor would change from Audi to Porsche and the focus would be on the WeatherTech SportsCar Championship where he would drive a Porsche 911 RSR together with Kévin Estre. During his last race with Audi, he won the Sepang 12 Hours together with Robin Frijns, Christopher Haase and Phoenix Racing. With this, he crowned himself as the first winner of the Intercontinental GT Challenge.

=== 2017–2021: Porsche Factory Driver in IMSA ===
In 2017, Vanhoor started his season at the Daytona 24 Hours with his new employer Porsche, in the WeatherTech SportsCar Championship. Together with Kévin Estre and Richard Lietz, he finished tenth overall and sixth in the GTLM-class with the new 2017-specification Porsche 911 RSR. After a relatively difficult first season, Vanthoor took his first win at the 2018 Mid-Ohio round.

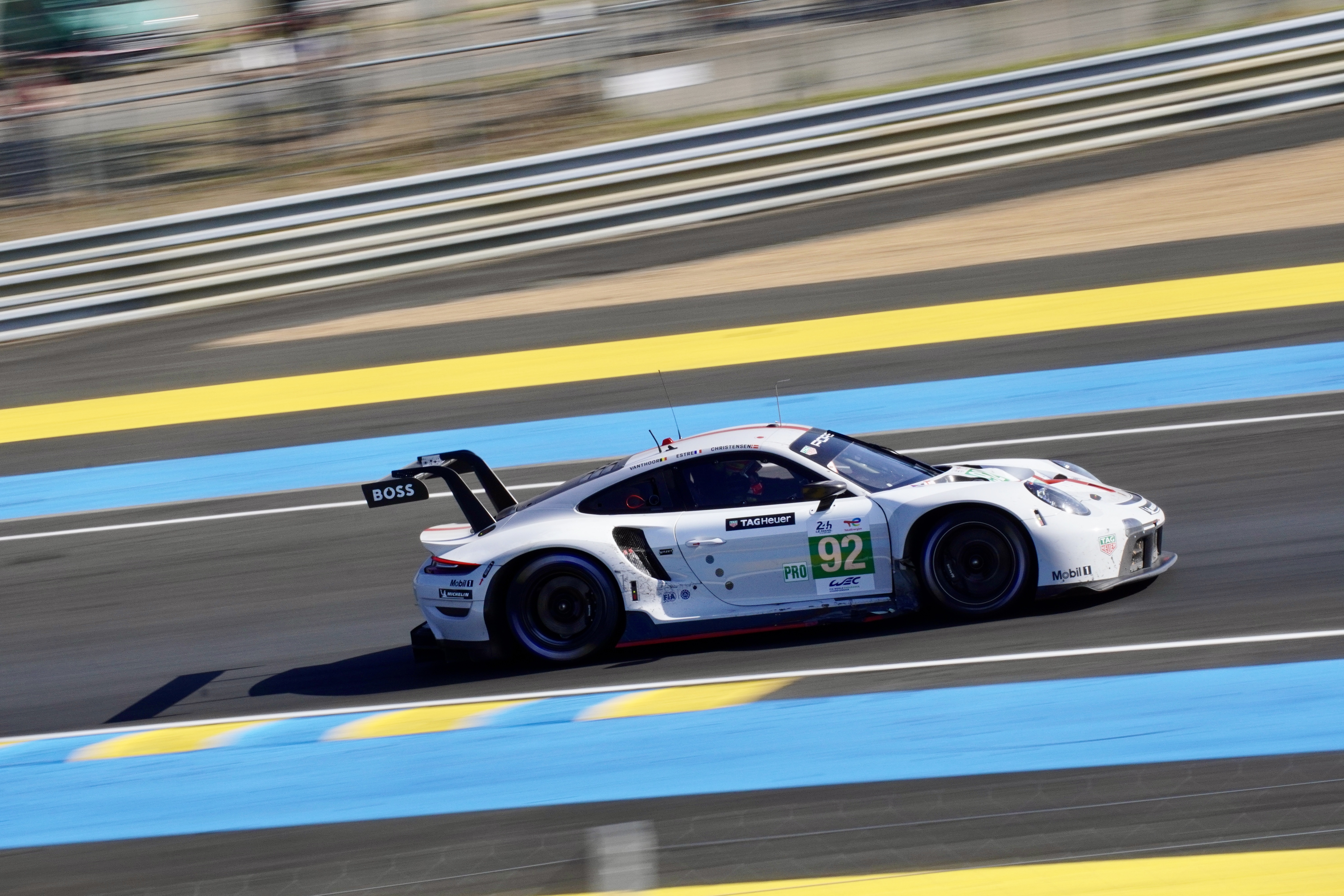
#92 Porsche 911 RSR at the 2022 24 Hours of Le Mans

During the 2018 season, Vanthoor also completed the Porsche Le Mans line-up for the No. 92 car together with Kévin Estre and Michael Christensen in the iconic “pink pig” livery. After taking the lead early on the team went on to win the GTE Pro class at the 2018 Le Mans 24 Hours. The following season, Vanthoor won the WeatherTech SportsCar Championship in the GTLM class for Porsche together with Earl Bamber. The duo took a total of three wins and seven podiums in eleven races. Porsche eventually decided to end its factory involvement in the GTLM class at the end of the 2020 season, leaving Vanthoor out of a factory program for the following season. He also won the 24 Hours of Spa a second time in 2020 driving a Porsche 911 GT3 R entered by Rowe Racing.

However, Vanthoor was kept as a Porsche factory driver and loaned out to customer team Pfaff Motorsports for the 2021 IMSA season. He and his teammate Zacharie Robichon won the championship in the GTD class.

=== 2022: Deutsche Tourenwagen Masters ===
In 2022, Vanthoor participated in the Deutsche Tourenwagen Masters for SSR Performance, driving a Porsche 911 GT3 R.

== Hypercar career ==
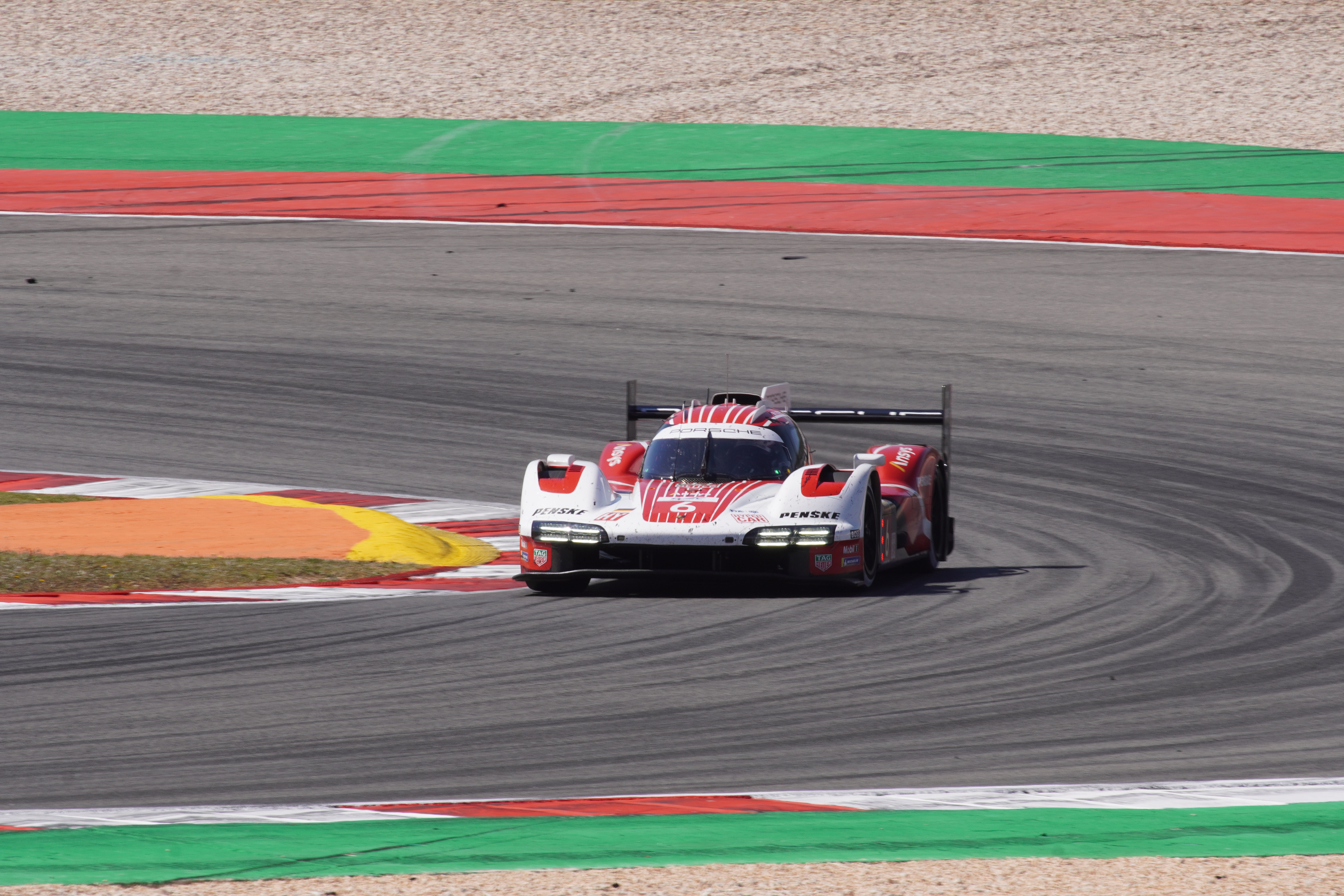
The Porsche 963 #6 during the FIA WEC 6 Hours of Portimão

For the 2023 season, Vanthoor moved into the Hypercar class of the FIA World Endurance Championship, partnering Kévin Estre and André Lotterer at the Porsche Penske Motorsport works team. The trio finished took their first podium at Portimão and finished third again in Fuji, where Vanthoor impressed by taking the lead at the start before holding it for the subsequent two hours against the Toyotas. Vanthoor and his teammates finished sixth in the standings, beating the sister car by ten points.

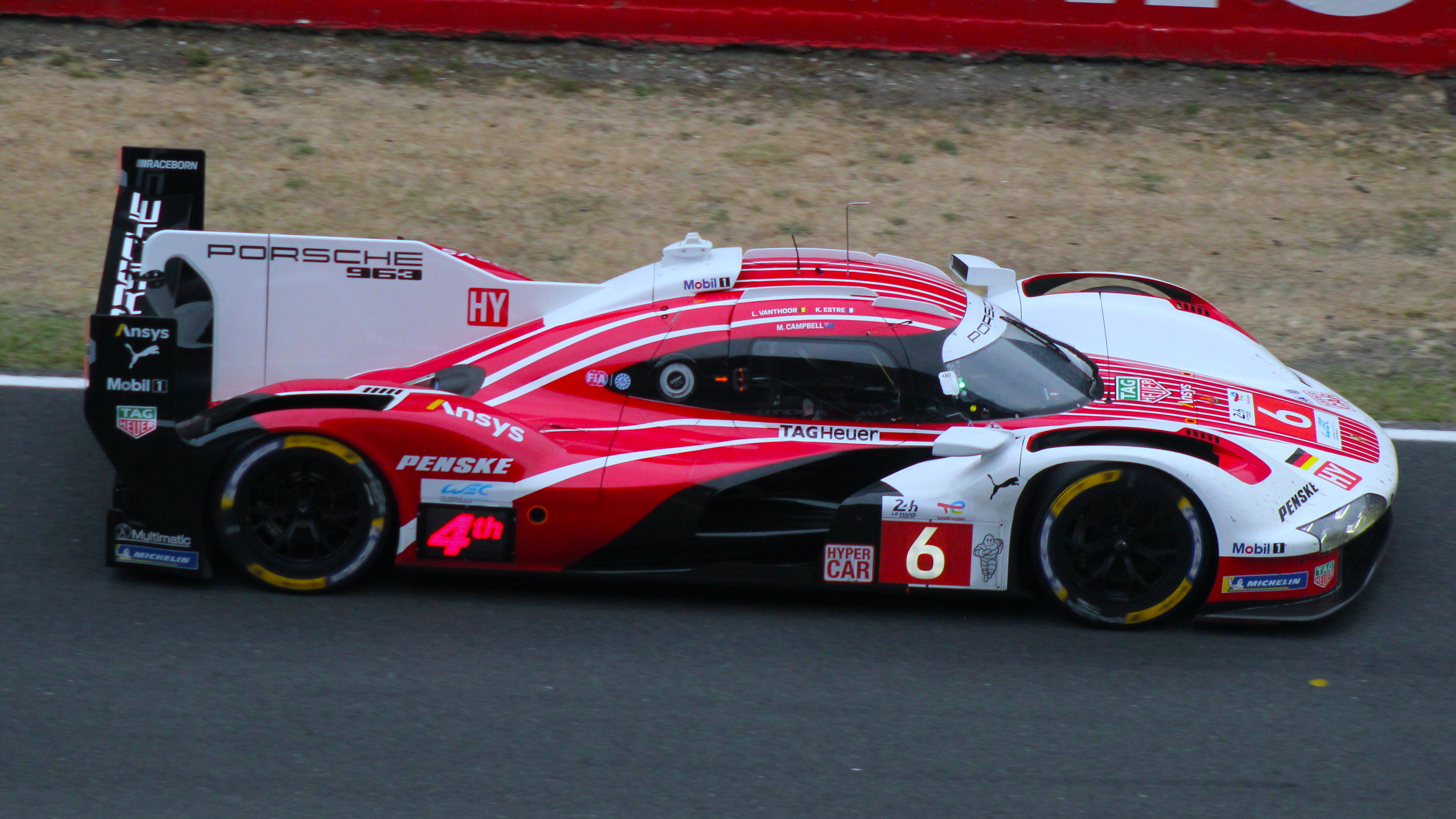
Vanthoor's No. 6 car at the 2025 24 Hours of Le Mans

In 2024, Vanthoor, Estre, and Lotterer returned to the WEC in Porsche's No. 6. At the season-opening Qatar 1812 km race, the team took their first victory with the 963 in a podium lockout for the chassis. Throughout the season, the team scored four more podiums, including another race win at the 2024 6 Hours of Fuji, all contributing to winning the 2024 FIA WEC Hypercar World Endurance Drivers' Championship overall.

In 2025, Vanthoor won the 2025 24 Hours of Daytona with Felipe Nasr and Nick Tandy after starting the endurance race in third.

== Racing record ==
=== Career summary ===
Season	Series	Team	Races	Wins	Poles	F/Laps	Podiums	Points	Position
2008	German Formula 3 Championship	Van Amersfoort Racing	18	2	3	2	9	85	4th
2008	Macau Grand Prix	RC Motorsport	1	0	0	0	0	N/A	6th
2009	German Formula 3 Championship	Van Amersfoort Racing	18	11	11	10	15	163	**1st**
2009	Masters of Formula 3	Carlin Motorsport	1	0	0	0	0	N/A	15th
2009	Macau Grand Prix	Signature	1	0	0	0	0	N/A	13th
2009	Belgian Touring Car Series	SEAT Belgium	2	0	1	0	1	0	NC†
2010	Formula 3 Euro Series	Signature	18	0	0	0	4	42	6th
2011	Formula 3 Euro Series	Signature	27	0	0	0	5	189	6th
2012	FIA GT1 World Championship	Belgian Audi Club Team WRT	18	3	1	0	3	122	4th
2012	Blancpain Endurance Series	Belgian Audi Club Team WRT	6	0	0	0	2	59	5th
2012	French GT Championship	Belgian Audi Club Team WRT	2	0	0	0	0	0	NC†
2013	FIA GT Series	Belgian Audi Club Team WRT	12	3	2	3	9	132	**1st**
2013	Blancpain Endurance Series	Belgian Audi Club Team WRT	5	0	1	0	1	24	14th
2013	24 Hours of Nürburgring - SP9	Belgian Audi Club Team WRT	1	0	0	0	0	N/A	?
2013	International Superstars Series	Audi Sport Italia	2	0	0	2	2	34	11th
2013	International GTSprint Series	MTM Motorsport	2	0	0	1	2	38	24th
2014	Blancpain Sprint Series	Belgian Audi Club Team WRT	14	4	3	0	6	100	4th
2014	Blancpain Endurance Series	Belgian Audi Club Team WRT	5	2	2	0	3	107	**1st**
2014	Macau GT Cup	Audi Race Experience	1	0	0	0	0	N/A	4th
2014	GT Asia Series	Audi Race Experience	1	0	0	0	0	0	NC†
2014	24 Hours of Nürburgring - SP9	Phoenix Racing	1	0	0	0	0	N/A	DNF
2015	Blancpain Sprint Series	Belgian Audi Club Team WRT	12	5	2	0	6	109	**3rd**
2015	Blancpain Endurance Series	Belgian Audi Club Team WRT	5	0	0	0	2	48	6th
2015	FIA World Endurance Championship - LMP2	OAK Racing	1	0	0	0	0	0	19th
2015	24 Hours of Le Mans - LMP2	OAK Racing	1	0	0	0	0	N/A	DNF
2015	Stock Car Brasil	Shell Racing	1	0	0	0	0	0	NC†
2015	Stock Car Brasil	Red Bull Racing	2	0	0	0	0	0	NC†
2015	24 Hours of Nürburgring - SP9	Audi Sport Team WRT	1	1	0	0	1	N/A	**1st**
2016	Blancpain GT Series Sprint Cup	Belgian Audi Club Team WRT	10	1	1	1	3	58	5th
2016	Blancpain GT Series Endurance Cup	Belgian Audi Club Team WRT	5	0	1	2	3	54	6th
2016	European Le Mans Series - LMP2	Belgian Audi Club Team WRT	1	0	0	0	1	18	19th
2016	FIA GT World Cup	Belgian Audi Club Team WRT	1	1	1	0	1	N/A	**1st**
2016	24H Series - A6	Belgian Audi Club Team WRT							
2016	ADAC GT Masters	kfzteile24 APR Motorsport	8	0	0	3	3	50	16th
2016	Italian GT Championship	Audi Sport Italia	2	0	1	0	2	24	18th
2016	Intercontinental GT Challenge	Audi Sport Team Phoenix	2	1	0	0	2	58	**1st**
2016	Intercontinental GT Challenge	Audi Sport Team WRT	1	0	1	1	1	58	**1st**
2016	Stock Car Brasil	Shell Racing	1	0	0	0	0	0	NC†
2016	24 Hours of Le Mans - LMP2	Michael Shank Racing	1	0	0	0	0	N/A	9th
2016	24 Hours of Nürburgring - SP9	Audi Sport Team WRT	1	0	0	0	0	N/A	19th
2017	IMSA SportsCar Championship - GTLM	Porsche GT Team	11	0	0	0	3	287	6th
2017	Blancpain GT Series Endurance Cup	KÜS TEAM75 Bernhard	1	0	0	0	0	12	22nd
2017	Pirelli World Challenge	GMG Racing	3	0	0	0	0	40	48th
2017	SprintX GT Championship Series	GMG Racing	3	0	0	0	0	30	32nd
2017	Intercontinental GT Challenge	Walkinshaw GT3	1	0	0	0	0	12	10th
2017	Intercontinental GT Challenge	KÜS TEAM75 Bernhard	1	0	0	0	0	12	10th
2017	FIA GT World Cup	Craft-Bamboo Racing	0	0	0	0	0	N/A	DNS
2017	24 Hours of Nürburgring - SP9	Falken Motorsports	1	0	0	0	0	N/A	DNF
2018	IMSA SportsCar Championship - GTLM	Porsche GT Team	11	1	0	1	4	308	5th
2018	24 Hours of Le Mans - LMGTE Pro	Porsche GT Team	1	1	0	0	1	N/A	**1st**
2018	Blancpain GT Series Endurance Cup	KÜS Team75 Bernhard	1	0	0	0	0	3	43rd
2018	Intercontinental GT Challenge	Craft-Bamboo Racing	2	0	0	0	0	11	19th
2018	Intercontinental GT Challenge	KÜS Team75 Bernhard	1	0	0	0	0	11	19th
2018	Stock Car Brasil	Shell V-Power	1	0	0	0	0	0	NC†
2018	FIA GT World Cup	Manthey Racing	0	0	0	0	0	N/A	DNS
2018	24 Hours of Nürburgring - SP9	Manthey Racing	1	0	0	0	0	N/A	DNF
2018–19	FIA World Endurance Championship - LMGTE Pro	Porsche GT Team	2	1	0	0	1	53	13th
2019	IMSA SportsCar Championship - GTLM	Porsche GT Team	11	3	2	4	7	330	**1st**
2019	24 Hours of Le Mans - LMGTE Pro	Porsche GT Team	1	0	0	0	0	N/A	9th
2019	Blancpain GT Series Endurance Cup	KÜS Team75 Bernhard	1	0	0	0	0	2	33rd
2019	Intercontinental GT Challenge	KÜS Team75 Bernhard	1	0	0	0	0	10	20th
2019	Intercontinental GT Challenge	Dinamic Motorsport	1	0	0	0	0	10	20th
2019	FIA GT World Cup	Rowe Racing	1	0	0	0	1	N/A	**2nd**
2019	24 Hours of Nürburgring - SP9	Manthey Racing	1	0	0	0	0	N/A	DSQ
2019–20	FIA World Endurance Championship - LMGTE Pro	Porsche GT Team	1	0	0	0	0	1	38th
2020	IMSA SportsCar Championship - GTLM	Porsche GT Team	10	1	1	1	5	289	6th
2020	24 Hours of Le Mans - LMGTE Pro	Porsche GT Team	1	0	0	0	0	N/A	6th
2020	GT World Challenge Europe Endurance Cup	Rowe Racing	1	1	0	0	1	33	10th
2020	Intercontinental GT Challenge	Earl Bamber Motorsport	1	0	0	0	0	37	**3rd**
2020	Intercontinental GT Challenge	Rowe Racing	1	1	0	0	1	37	**3rd**
2020	Intercontinental GT Challenge	Dinamic Motorsport	1	0	0	0	0	37	**3rd**
2021	IMSA SportsCar Championship - GTD	Pfaff Motorsports	11	4	0	0	7	3284	**1st**
2021	GT World Challenge Europe Endurance Cup	KCMG	1	0	0	0	0	12	19th
2021	Intercontinental GT Challenge	KCMG	1	0	0	0	0	12	15th
2021	24 Hours of Le Mans - LMGTE Pro	WeatherTech Racing	1	0	0	0	0	N/A	DNF
2021	24 Hours of Nürburgring - SP9	Rutronik Racing	1	0	0	0	0	N/A	DNF
2022	Deutsche Tourenwagen Masters	SSR Performance	14	0	0	0	0	30	18th
2022	IMSA SportsCar Championship - GTD Pro	KCMG	1	0	0	1	1	324	24th
2022	GT World Challenge Europe Endurance Cup	KCMG	1	0	0	0	0	12	25th
2022	Intercontinental GT Challenge	KCMG	1	0	0	0	0	12	14th*
2022	FIA World Endurance Championship - LMGTE Pro	Porsche GT Team	1	0	0	0	0	24	13th
2022	24 Hours of Le Mans - LMGTE Pro	Porsche GT Team	1	0	0	1	0	N/A	4th
2022	24 Hours of Nürburgring - SP9	Manthey Racing	1	0	0	0	0	N/A	DNF
2023	FIA World Endurance Championship - Hypercar	Porsche Penske Motorsport	7	0	0	0	2	71	6th
2023	IMSA SportsCar Championship - GTP	Porsche Penske Motorsport	1	0	0	0	0	236	25th
2023	24 Hours of Le Mans - Hypercar	Porsche Penske Motorsport	1	0	0	0	0	N/A	11th
2023	GT World Challenge Europe Endurance Cup	Manthey EMA	1	0	0	0	0	20	13th
2023	Intercontinental GT Challenge	Manthey EMA	1	0	0	0	1	15	21st
2023	IMSA SportsCar Championship - GTD Pro	Pfaff Motorsports	2	1	0	0	1	659	12th
2023	24 Hours of Nürburgring - SP9	Dinamic GT	1	0	0	0	0	N/A	DNF
2023	FIA GT World Cup	TORO Racing	1	0	0	0	0	N/A	6th
2024	FIA World Endurance Championship - Hypercar	Porsche Penske Motorsport	8	2	1	0	5	152	**1st**
2024	IMSA SportsCar Championship - GTP	Porsche Penske Motorsport	1	0	0	0	0	304	26th
2024	Intercontinental GT Challenge	Manthey EMA	3	2	0	0	2	37,5	**1st***
2024	Nürburgring Langstrecken-Serie - SP9	Manthey EMA	2	1	0	1	2	0	NC†
2024	24 Hours of Nürburgring - SP9	Manthey EMA	1	0	0	0	1	N/A	**2nd**
2024	GT World Challenge Europe Endurance Cup	HubAuto Racing	1	0	0	0	0	0	NC
2024	FIA GT World Cup	Absolute Racing	1	0	0	0	0	0	5th
2025	FIA World Endurance Championship - Hypercar	Porsche Penske Motorsport	8	1	0	0	3	94	4th
2025	IMSA SportsCar Championship - GTP	Porsche Penske Motorsport	3	2	0	1	2	998	16th
2025	IMSA SportsCar Championship - GTD	AO Racing	1	1	0	1	1	382	52nd
2025	Nürburgring Langstrecken-Serie - SP9	Scherer Sport PHX	2	2	0	?	2	0	NC††*
2025	24 Hours of Nürburgring - SP9	Scherer Sport PHX	0	0	0	0	0	N/A	WD
2025	Belcar Endurance Championship - GT Cup	D’Ieteren Luxury Performance by NGT							
2025	FIA GT World Cup	Tempo by Absolute Racing	1	0	0	0	0	N/A	9th
2026	IMSA SportsCar Championship - GTP	Porsche Penske Motorsport	8	1	0	1	3	2386	12th
2026	24 Hours of Nürburgring - SP9	Lionspeed GP	1	0	0	0	0	N/A	4th
2026	24 Hours of Le Mans - LMP2	United Autosports	Reserve driver						

^{†} As Vanthoor was a guest driver, he was ineligible for points.
^{††} No. 16 Scherer Sport PHX is ineligible for points.
^{*} Season still in progress.

=== Complete ATS F3 Cup results ===
(key)

Year	Entrant	Chassis	Engine	1	2	3	4	5	6	7	8	9	10	11	12	13	14	15	16	17	18	DC	Points
2008	Van Amersfoort Racing	Dallara F306	Volkswagen	HOC1; 1; 12	HOC1; 2 Ret	OSC1; 1; 2	OSC1; 2; 8	NÜR1; 1 Ret	NÜR1; 2; 2	**HOC2**; **1** Ret	HOC2; 2; 7	ASS; 1; 6	ASS; 2; 3	NÜR2; 1; 2	NÜR2; 2; 2	LAU; 1; 2	LAU; 2; 11	**SAC**; **1**; 2	SAC; 2; 1	**OSC2**; **1**; 18†	OSC2; 2; 1	4th	85
2009	Van Amersfoort Racing	Dallara F306	Volkswagen	**OSC1**; **1**; 1	**OSC1**; **2**; 11	**NÜR1**; **1**; 1	NÜR1; 2; 2	HOC; 1; 2	**HOC**; **2**; 1	OSC2; 1; 1	**OSC2**; **2**; 1	**LAU**; **1**; 1	**LAU**; **2**; 2	**ASS**; **1**; 1	**ASS**; **2**; 1	**NÜR2**; **1**; 1	NÜR2; 2; 12	SAC; 1 Ret	**SAC**; **2**; 1	OSC3; 1; 1	OSC3; 2; 2	1st	163

=== Complete Formula 3 Euro Series results ===
(key)

Year	Entrant	Chassis	Engine	1	2	3	4	5	6	7	8	9	10	11	12	13	14	15	16	17	18	19	20	21	22	23	24	25	26	27	DC	Points
2010	Signature	Dallara F308/033	Volkswagen	LEC; 1 Ret	LEC; 2; 5	HOC; 1 Ret	HOC; 2 Ret	VAL; 1; 5	VAL; 2; 3	NOR; 1; 9	NOR; 2; 5	NÜR; 1; 2	NÜR; 2; 11	ZAN; 1; 7	ZAN; 2; 2	**BRH**; **1**; 2	BRH; 2; 7	OSC; 1; 13	OSC; 2; 4	HOC; 1; 6	HOC; 2 DSQ										6th	42
2011	Signature	Dallara F309/023	Volkswagen	LEC; 1; 8	LEC; 2; 7	LEC; 3; 5	HOC; 1; 3	HOC; 2; 6	HOC; 3; 15	ZAN; 1; 4	ZAN; 2; 5	ZAN; 3; 6	RBR; 1; 7	RBR; 2; 2	RBR; 3; 7	NOR; 1; 2	NOR; 2; 8	NOR; 3; 4	NÜR; 1; 5	NÜR; 2; 3	NÜR; 3; 5	SIL; 1; 6	SIL; 2; 6	SIL; 3; 4	VAL; 1; 11	VAL; 2; 11	VAL; 3; 6	HOC; 1; 3	HOC; 2; 9	HOC; 3; 12	6th	189

=== FIA GT competition results ===
==== Complete GT1 World Championship results ====
Year	Team	Car	1	2	3	4	5	6	7	8	9	10	11	12	13	14	15	16	17	18	Pos	Points
2012	Belgian Audi Club Team WRT	Audi R8 LMS ultra	NOG; QR; 1	NOG; CR; 1	ZOL; QR; 12	ZOL; CR; 6	NAV; QR; 9	NAV; QR; 10	SVK; QR; 11	SVK; CR; 6	ALG; QR; 10	ALG; CR; 6	SVK; QR; 5	SVK; CR; 5	MOS; QR; 1	MOS; CR; 4	NUR; QR; 2	NUR; CR; 6	DON; QR; 2	DON; CR; 4	4th	122

=== Complete FIA GT Series results ===
Year	Team	Car	Class	1	2	3	4	5	6	7	8	9	10	11	12	Pos.	Points
2013	Belgian Audi Club Team WRT	Audi R8 LMS ultra	Pro	NOG; QR; 16	NOG; CR; 2	ZOL; QR; 1	**ZOL**; **CR**; 2	ZAN; QR; 1	**ZAN**; **CR**; 2	SVK; QR; 2	SVK; CR; 3	NAV; QR; 7	NAV; CR; 15	BAK; QR; 2	BAK; CR; 1	1st	132

=== Complete Blancpain GT Series Sprint Cup results ===
Year	Team	Car	Class	1	2	3	4	5	6	7	8	9	10	11	12	13	14	Pos.	Points
2014	Belgian Audi Club Team WRT	Audi R8 LMS ultra	Pro	NOG; QR; 1	NOG; CR; Ret	**BRH**; **QR**; 6	BRH; CR; 4	ZAN; QR; 3	ZAN; CR; 10	**SVK**; **QR**; 1	SVK; CR; 11	ALG; QR; 4	ALG; CR; 8	**ZOL**; **QR**; 1	ZOL; CR; 3	BAK; QR; 1	BAK; CR; 1	4th	100
2015	Belgian Audi Club Team WRT	Audi R8 LMS ultra	Pro	NOG; QR; DNS	NOG; CR; DNS	**BRH**; **QR**; 1	BRH; CR; 1	**ZOL**; **QR**; 1	ZOL; CR; 1	MOS; QR; Ret	MOS; CR; 5	ALG; QR; 2	ALG; CR; 1	MIS; QR; Ret	MIS; CR; DNS	ZAN; QR	ZAN; CR	3rd	109
2016	Belgian Audi Club Team WRT	Audi R8 LMS	Pro	**MIS**; **QR**; 3	MIS; CR; 1	BRH; QR; 5	BRH; CR; 15	NÜR; QR; 24	NÜR; CR; 7	HUN; QR; 3	HUN; CR; 8	CAT; QR; 13	CAT; CR; 4					5th	58

=== Complete Bathurst 12 Hour results ===
Year	Team	Co-drivers	Car	Class	Laps	Ovr. Pos.	Cla. Pos.
2014	(Germany) Phoenix Racing	(Switzerland) Rahel Frey (Germany) René Rast	Audi R8 LMS ultra	A	296	5th	5th
2015	(Germany) Phoenix Racing	(Italy) Marco Mapelli (Germany) Markus Winkelhock	Audi R8 LMS ultra	Pro	269	**2nd**	**1st**
2016	(Germany) Phoenix Racing	(Australia) Alex Davison (Germany) Markus Winkelhock	Audi R8 LMS	Pro	297	4th	4th
2017	(Australia) Walkinshaw Racing	(New Zealand) Earl Bamber (France) Kévin Estre	Porsche 911 GT3 R	Pro	44	DNF	DNF
2018	(Hong Kong) Craft-Bamboo Racing	(New Zealand) Earl Bamber (France) Kévin Estre	Porsche 911 GT3 R	Pro	271	5th	**3rd**
2020	(New Zealand) Earl Bamber Motorsport	(New Zealand) Earl Bamber (Australia) Craig Lowndes	Porsche 911 GT3 R	Pro	312	9th	8th
2024	(Germany) Manthey Racing / (Australia) EMA Motorsport	(Australia) Matthew Campbell (Turkey) Ayhancan Güven	Porsche 911 GT3 R (992)	Pro	275	**1st**	**1st**

=== Complete Intercontinental GT Challenge results ===
Year	Manufacturer	Car	1	2	3	4	5	Pos.	Points
2016	Audi	Audi R8 LMS	BAT; 3	SPA; 2	SEP; 1			1st	58
2017	Porsche	Porsche 911 GT3 R	BAT; Ret	SPA; 4	LAG; DNS			10th	12
2018	Porsche	Porsche 911 GT3 R	BAT; 5	SPA; Ret	SUZ; 10	LAG		19th	12
2019	Porsche	Porsche 911 GT3 R	BAT	LAG	SPA; 7	SUZ	KYA; 8	25th	10
2020	Porsche	Porsche 911 GT3 R	BAT; 7	IND	SPA; 1	KYA; 7		3rd	37
2021	Porsche	Porsche 911 GT3 R	SPA; 5	IND	KYA			15th	12
2022	Porsche	Porsche 911 GT3 R	BAT	SPA; 5	IND	GUL		16th	10
2023	Porsche	Porsche 911 GT3 R	BAT	KYA	SPA; 3	IND	GUL	21st	15
2024	Porsche	Porsche 911 GT3 R (992)	BAT; 1	NUR; 1	SPA; Ret	IND		2nd	50
2025	Porsche	Porsche 911 GT3 R (992)		NUR; WD					

^{*} Season still in progress.

=== Complete 24 Hours of Spa results ===
Year	Team	Co-Drivers	Car	Class	Laps	Pos.	Class Pos.
2012	(Belgium) Belgian Audi Club Team WRT	(Italy) Marco Bonanomi (Sweden) Edward Sandström	Audi R8 LMS ultra	Pro Cup	417	DNF	DNF
2013	(Belgium) Belgian Audi Club Team WRT	(Monaco) Stéphane Ortelli (Germany) René Rast	Audi R8 LMS ultra	Pro Cup	79	DNF	DNF
2014	(Belgium) Belgian Audi Club Team WRT	(Germany) René Rast (Germany) Markus Winkelhock	Audi R8 LMS ultra	Pro Cup	527	**1st**	**1st**
2015	(Belgium) Belgian Audi Club Team WRT	(Germany) René Rast (Germany) Markus Winkelhock	Audi R8 LMS	Pro Cup	508	21st	11th
2016	(Belgium) Belgian Audi Club Team WRT	(Switzerland) Nico Müller (Germany) René Rast	Audi R8 LMS	Pro Cup	531	**3rd**	**3rd**
2017	(Germany) KÜS Team75 Bernhard	(Denmark) Michael Christensen (France) Kévin Estre	Porsche 911 GT3 R	Pro Cup	546	4th	4th
2018	(Germany) KÜS Team75 Bernhard	(New Zealand) Earl Bamber (Germany) Timo Bernhard	Porsche 911 GT3 R	Pro Cup	353	DNF	DNF
2019	(Germany) KÜS Team75 Bernhard	(New Zealand) Earl Bamber (Germany) Timo Bernhard	Porsche 911 GT3 R	Pro Cup	362	9th	9th
2020	(Germany) ROWE Racing	(New Zealand) Earl Bamber (United Kingdom) Nick Tandy	Porsche 911 GT3 R	Pro Cup	527	**1st**	**1st**
2021	(Hong Kong) KCMG	(Belgium) Maxime Martin (United Kingdom) Nick Tandy	Porsche 911 GT3 R	Pro Cup	554	5th	5th
2022	(Hong Kong) KCMG	(Norway) Dennis Olsen (United Kingdom) Nick Tandy	Porsche 911 GT3 R	Pro Cup	536	7th	7th
2023	(Germany) Manthey EMA	(France) Julien Andlauer (France) Kévin Estre	Porsche 911 GT3 R (992)	Pro Cup	537	4th	4th
2024	(Taiwan) HubAuto Racing	(France) Kévin Estre (France) Patrick Pilet	Porsche 911 GT3 R (992)	Pro Cup	88	DNF	DNF

=== Complete 24 Hours of Nürburgring results ===
Year	Team	Co-Drivers	Car	Class	Laps	Pos.	Class Pos.
2013	(Belgium) Belgian Audi Club Team WRT	(Germany) Christopher Haase (Germany) Christopher Mies (Sweden) Edward Sandström	Audi R8 LMS ultra	SP9 GT3	44	DNF	DNF
2014	(Germany) Phoenix Racing	(Germany) Marc Basseng (Switzerland) Marcel Fässler (Germany) Frank Stippler	Audi R8 LMS ultra	SP9 GT3	8	DNF	DNF
2015	(Belgium) Audi Sport Team WRT	(Germany) Christopher Mies (Switzerland) Nico Müller (Sweden) Edward Sandström	Audi R8 LMS	SP9 GT3	156	**1st**	**1st**
2015	(Belgium) Audi Sport Team WRT	(Denmark) Nicki Thiim (Germany) Christer Jöns (Germany) Pierre Kaffer	Audi R8 LMS	SP9 GT3	153	7th	7th
2016	(Belgium) Audi Sport Team WRT	(Germany) Pierre Kaffer (Germany) Christopher Mies (Switzerland) Nico Müller	Audi R8 LMS	SP9	109	47th	19th
2017	(Germany) Falken Motorsports	(Germany) Jörg Bergmeister (Austria) Martin Ragginger (Germany) Dirk Werner	Porsche 911 GT3 R	SP9	23	DNF	DNF
2018	(Germany) Manthey Racing	(New Zealand) Earl Bamber (France) Romain Dumas (France) Kévin Estre	Porsche 911 GT3 R	SP9	66	DNF	DNF
2019	(Germany) Manthey Racing	(New Zealand) Earl Bamber (Denmark) Michael Christensen (France) Kévin Estre	Porsche 911 GT3 R	SP9 PRO	156	DSQ	DSQ
2021	(Germany) Rutronik Racing	(France) Julien Andlauer (France) Romain Dumas (Germany) Tobias Müller	Porsche 911 GT3 R	SP9 PRO	47	DNF	DNF
2022	(Germany) Manthey Racing	(Denmark) Michael Christensen (France) Kévin Estre (France) Frédéric Makowiecki	Porsche 911 GT3 R	SP9 PRO	22	DNF	DNF
2023	(Italy) Dinamic GT	(Germany) Christian Engelhart (Turkey) Ayhancan Güven (Germany) Laurin Heinrich	Porsche 911 GT3 R (992)	SP9 PRO	83	DNF	DNF
2024	(Germany) Manthey EMA	(France) Kévin Estre (Turkey) Ayhancan Güven (Austria) Thomas Preining	Porsche 911 GT3 R (992)	SP9 PRO	50	**2nd**	**2nd**
2025	(Germany) Scherer Sport PHX	(Switzerland) Ricardo Feller (Switzerland) Patric Niederhauser (France) Patrick Pilet	Porsche 911 GT3 R (992)	SP9 PRO	—N/a	WD	
2026	(Germany) Lionspeed GP	(Switzerland) Ricardo Feller (Germany) Laurin Heinrich	Porsche 911 GT3 R (992.2)	SP9 PRO	156	5th	4th

=== Complete 24 Hours of Le Mans results ===
Year	Team	Co-Drivers	Car	Class	Laps	Pos.	Class Pos.
2015	(France) OAK Racing	(Canada) Chris Cumming (France) Kévin Estre	Ligier JS P2-Honda	LMP2	329	DNF	DNF
2016	(United States) Michael Shank Racing	(Brazil) Oswaldo Negri (United States) John Pew	Ligier JS P2-Honda	LMP2	345	14th	9th
2018	(Germany) Porsche GT Team	(Denmark) Michael Christensen (France) Kévin Estre	Porsche 911 RSR	GTE; Pro	344	15th	**1st**
2019	(Germany) Porsche GT Team	(Denmark) Michael Christensen (France) Kévin Estre	Porsche 911 RSR	GTE; Pro	337	29th	9th
2020	(Germany) Porsche GT Team	(Denmark) Michael Christensen (France) Kévin Estre	Porsche 911 RSR-19	GTE; Pro	331	35th	6th
2021	(United States) WeatherTech Racing	(New Zealand) Earl Bamber (United States) Cooper MacNeil	Porsche 911 RSR-19	GTE; Pro	139	DNF	DNF
2022	(Germany) Porsche GT Team	(Denmark) Michael Christensen (France) Kévin Estre	Porsche 911 RSR-19	GTE; Pro	348	31st	4th
2023	(Germany) Porsche Penske Motorsport	(France) Kévin Estre (Germany) André Lotterer	Porsche 963	Hypercar	320	22nd	11th
2024	(Germany) Porsche Penske Motorsport	(France) Kévin Estre (Germany) André Lotterer	Porsche 963	Hypercar	311	4th	4th
2025	(Germany) Porsche Penske Motorsport	(Australia) Matt Campbell (France) Kévin Estre	Porsche 963	Hypercar	387	2nd	2nd

=== Complete FIA World Endurance Championship results ===
Year	Entrant	Class	Chassis	Engine	1	2	3	4	5	6	7	8	Rank	Points
2015	OAK Racing	LMP2	Ligier JS P2	Honda HR28TT 2.8 L Turbo V6	SIL	SPA	LMS; Ret	NÜR	COA	FUJ	SHA	BHR	19th	0
2018–19	Porsche GT Team	LMGTE Pro	Porsche 911 RSR	Porsche M97/80 4.0 L Flat-6	SPA	LMS; 1	SIL	FUJ	SHA	SEB	SPA	LMS; 5	13th	353
2019–20	Porsche GT Team	LMGTE Pro	Porsche 911 RSR-19	Porsche M97/80 4.2 L Flat-6	SIL	FUJ	SHA	BHR	COA	SPA	LMS; 11	BHR	38th	1
2022	Porsche GT Team	LMGTE Pro	Porsche 911 RSR-19	Porsche M97/80 4.2 L Flat-6	SEB	SPA	LMS; 4	MNZ	FUJ	BHR			13th	24
2023	Porsche Penske Motorsport	Hypercar	Porsche 963	Porsche 9RD 4.6 L Turbo V8	SEB; 6	ALG; 3	SPA; Ret	LMS; 8	MNZ; 7	FUJ; 3	BHR; 5		6th	71
2024	Porsche Penske Motorsport	Hypercar	Porsche 963	Porsche 9RD 4.6 L Turbo V8	QAT; 1	IMO; 2	SPA; 2	**LMS**; 4	SÃO; 2	COA; 6	FUJ; 1	BHR; 10	1st	152
2025	Porsche Penske Motorsport	Hypercar	Porsche 963	Porsche 9RD 4.6 L Turbo V8	QAT; 11	IMO; 8	SPA; 9	LMS; 2	SÃO; 4	COA; 1	FUJ; 3	BHR; 13	4th	94

=== Complete European Le Mans Series results ===
Year	Entrant	Class	Chassis	Engine	1	2	3	4	5	6	Rank	Points
2016	Team WRT	LMP2	Ligier JS P2	Judd HK 3.6 L V8	SIL	IMO	RBR	LEC	SPA; 2	EST	19th	18

=== Complete IMSA SportsCar Championship results ===
(key) (Races in bold indicate pole position) (Races in italics indicate fastest lap)

Year	Entrant	Class	Car	Engine	1	2	3	4	5	6	7	8	9	10	11	12	Rank	Points	Ref
2017	Porsche GT Team	GTLM	Porsche 911 RSR	Porsche M97/80 4.0 L Flat-6	DAY; 6	SEB; 8	LBH; 3	COA; 8	WGL; 6	MOS; 6	LIM; 2	ELK; 2	VIR; 7	LGA; 7	PET; 5		6th	287	
2018	Porsche GT Team	GTLM	Porsche 911 RSR	Porsche M97/80 4.0 L Flat-6	DAY; 6	SEB; 3	LBH; 7	MDO; 1	WGL; 4	MOS; 6	LIM; 3	ELK; 4	VIR; 5	LGA; 2	PET; 6		5th	308	
2019	Porsche GT Team	GTLM	Porsche 911 RSR	Porsche M97/80 4.0 L Flat-6	DAY; 3	SEB; 5	LBH; 1	MDO; 1	WGL; 6	MOS; 1	**LIM**; 2	ELK; 3	**VIR**; 2	LGA; 7	PET; 5		1st	330	
2020	Porsche GT Team	GTLM	Porsche 911 RSR-19	Porsche M97/80 4.2 L Flat-6	DAY; 2	DAY; 2	SEB; 3	**ELK**; 5	VIR; 5	ATL; 6	MDO	CLT; 6	PET; 5	LGA; 1	SEB; 2		6th	289	
2021	Pfaff Motorsports	GTD	Porsche 911 GT3 R	Porsche M97/80 4.2 L Flat-6	DAY; 12	SEB; 1	MDO; 6	DET	WGL; 7	WGL	LIM; 4	ELK; 1	LGA; 1	LBH; 2	VIR; 1	PET; 2	1st	3284	
2022	KCMG	GTD Pro	Porsche 911 GT3 R	Porsche MA1.76/MDG.G 4.0 L Flat-6	DAY; 3	SEB	LBH	LGA	WGL	MOS	LIM	ELK	VIR	PET			24th	321	
2023	Pfaff Motorsports	GTD Pro	Porsche 911 GT3 R (992)	Porsche M97/80 4.2 L Flat-6	DAY; 5	SEB; 1	LBH	LGA	WGL	MOS	LIM	ELK	VIR	IMS			12th	659	
2023	Porsche Penske Motorsport	GTP	Porsche 963	Porsche 9RD 4.6 L Turbo V8											PET; 10		25th	236	
2024	Porsche Penske Motorsport	GTP	Porsche 963	Porsche 9RD 4.6 L Turbo V8	DAY; 4	SEB	LBH	LGA	DET	WGL	ELK	IMS	PET				26th	304	
2025	Porsche Penske Motorsport	GTP	Porsche 963	Porsche 9RD 4.6 L Turbo V8	DAY; 1	SEB; 1		LGA	DET	WGL	ELK	IMS	PET; 10				16th	998	
2025	AO Racing	GTD	Porsche 911 GT3 R (992)	Porsche M97/80 4.2 L Flat-6			LBH; 1										52nd	382	
2026	Porsche Penske Motorsport	GTP	Porsche 963	Porsche 9RD 4.6 L Turbo V8	DAY; 4	SEB; 2	LBH; 3	LGA; 6	DET; 8	WGL; 6	ELK; 8	IMS	PET; 1				12th	2386	

=== Complete Stock Car Brasil results ===
(key) (Races in bold indicate pole position) (Races in italics indicate fastest lap)

Year	Team	Car	1	2	3	4	5	6	7	8	9	10	11	12	13	14	15	16	17	18	19	20	21	Rank	Points
2015	Shell Racing	Chevrolet Sonic	GOI; 1; 8	RBP; 1	RBP; 2	VEL; 1	VEL; 2	CUR; 1	CUR; 2	SCZ; 1	SCZ; 2													NC†	0†
2015	Red Bull Racing	Chevrolet Sonic										CUR; 1; 19	CUR; 2 Ret	GOI; 1	CAS; 1	CAS; 2	MOU; 1	MOU; 2	CUR; 1	CUR; 2	TAR; 1	TAR; 2	INT; 1	NC†	0†
2016	Shell Racing	Chevrolet Cruze	CUR; 1; 5	VEL; 1	VEL; 2	GOI; 1	GOI; 2	SCZ; 1	SCZ; 2	TAR; 1	TAR; 2	CAS; 1	CAS; 2	INT; 1	LON; 1	LON; 2	CUR; 1	CUR; 2	GOI; 1	GOI; 2	CDC; 1	CDC; 2	INT; 1	NC†	0†
2018	Shell V-Power	Chevrolet Cruze	INT; 1; 4	CUR; 1	CUR; 2	VEL; 1	VEL; 2	LON; 1	LON; 2	SCZ; 1	SCZ; 2	GOI; 1	MOU; 1	MOU; 2	CAS; 1	CAS; 2	VCA; 1	VCA; 2	TAR; 1	TAR; 2	GOI; 1	GOI; 2	INT; 1	NC†	0†

^{†} As Vanthoor was a guest driver, he was ineligible for points.

=== Complete Deutsche Tourenwagen Masters results ===
(key) (Races in bold indicate pole position; races in italics indicate fastest lap)

Year	Entrant	Chassis	1	2	3	4	5	6	7	8	9	10	11	12	13	14	15	16	Rank	Points
2022	SSR Performance	Porsche 911 GT3 R	ALG; 1; 8	ALG; 2; 7	LAU; 1; 7	LAU; 2; 9	IMO; 1; 13	IMO; 2 Ret	NOR; 1; 4	NOR; 2; 16	NÜR; 1 Ret	NÜR; 2; 11	SPA; 1 Ret	SPA; 2; 12	RBR; 1 Ret	RBR; 2; 16	HOC; 1	HOC; 2	18th	30

=== Complete 24 Hours of Zolder results ===
Year	Team	Co-Drivers	Car	Class	Laps	Pos.	Class Pos.
2012	(Belgium) Team WRT	(Italy) Marco Bonanomi (Belgium) Anthony Kumpen (Sweden) Edward Sandström	Audi R8 LMS ultra	GT	860	**1st**	**1st**
2013	(Belgium) Team WRT	(Belgium) Enzo Ide (Belgium) Bert Longin (Belgium) Anthony Kumpen	Audi R8 LMS ultra	GT	765	4th	**3rd**
2024	(Belgium) RedAnt Racing	(Turkey) Ayhancan Güven (Belgium) Dirk Van Rompuy (Belgium) Tom Van Rompuy	Porsche 992 GT3 Cup	GTA	778	5th	5th
2025	(Belgium) D'Ieteren Luxury Performance by NGT	(Belgium) Bertrand Baguette (Sweden) Robin Knutsson (Belgium) Glenn Van Parijs (Belgium) Cédric Wauters	Porsche 992 GT3 Cup	GT Cup	818	2nd	2nd
2026	(Belgium) NGT Racing	(Belgium) Bertrand Baguette (United Kingdom) Jonny Edgar (Belgium) Glenn Van Parijs (Belgium) Tom Van Rompuy	Porsche 992 GT3 Cup	GT Cup	778	**1st**	**1st**

== Notes ==
Sporting positions
Preceded by Frédéric Vervisch	German Formula 3 Championship; Champion; 2009	Succeeded by Tom Dillmann
Preceded by Markus Winkelhock; Marc Basseng (GT1)	FIA GT Series; Champion; 2013; With: Stéphane Ortelli	Succeeded by Maximilian Götz (Blancpain Sprint Series)
Preceded by Maximilian Buhk	Blancpain Endurance Series; Champion; 2014	Succeeded by Alex Buncombe; Katsumasa Chiyo; Wolfgang Reip
Preceded by Inaugural	Blancpain GT Series; Champion; 2014	Succeeded by Robin Frijns
Preceded by Inaugural	Intercontinental GT Challenge; Champion; 2016	Succeeded by Markus Winkelhock
Preceded by Antonio García; Jan Magnussen	IMSA SportsCar Championship; GTLM Champion; 2019; With: Earl Bamber	Succeeded by Antonio García; Jordan Taylor
Preceded by Mario Farnbacher; Matt McMurry	IMSA SportsCar Championship; GTD Champion; 2021; With: Zach Robichon	Succeeded by Roman De Angelis
Preceded by Jules Gounon; Kenny Habul; Luca Stolz	Winner of the Bathurst 12 Hour; 2024; With: Matthew Campbell & Ayhancan Güven	Succeeded by Augusto Farfus; Kelvin van der Linde; Sheldon van der Linde
Preceded by Sébastien Buemi; Brendon Hartley; Ryo Hirakawa	World Endurance Championship; Champion; 2024; With: André Lotterer & Kévin Estre	Succeeded by James Calado; Antonio Giovinazzi; Alessandro Pier Guidi
Awards
Preceded by Benjamin Bailly	RACB; Rookie Driver of the Year; 2008	Succeeded by Incumbent
Records
Preceded by (Macau Grand Prix)	Youngest driver to compete in the Macau Grand Prix; 17 years, 192 days (2008)	Succeeded by Incumbent
Preceded by Carlo van Dam; 21 years, 202 days	Youngest driver to win the German Formula 3 Championship; 18 years, 108 days (2009)	Succeeded by Incumbent
