= 2016 Intercontinental GT Challenge =

Seasons
- ← none 2017 →

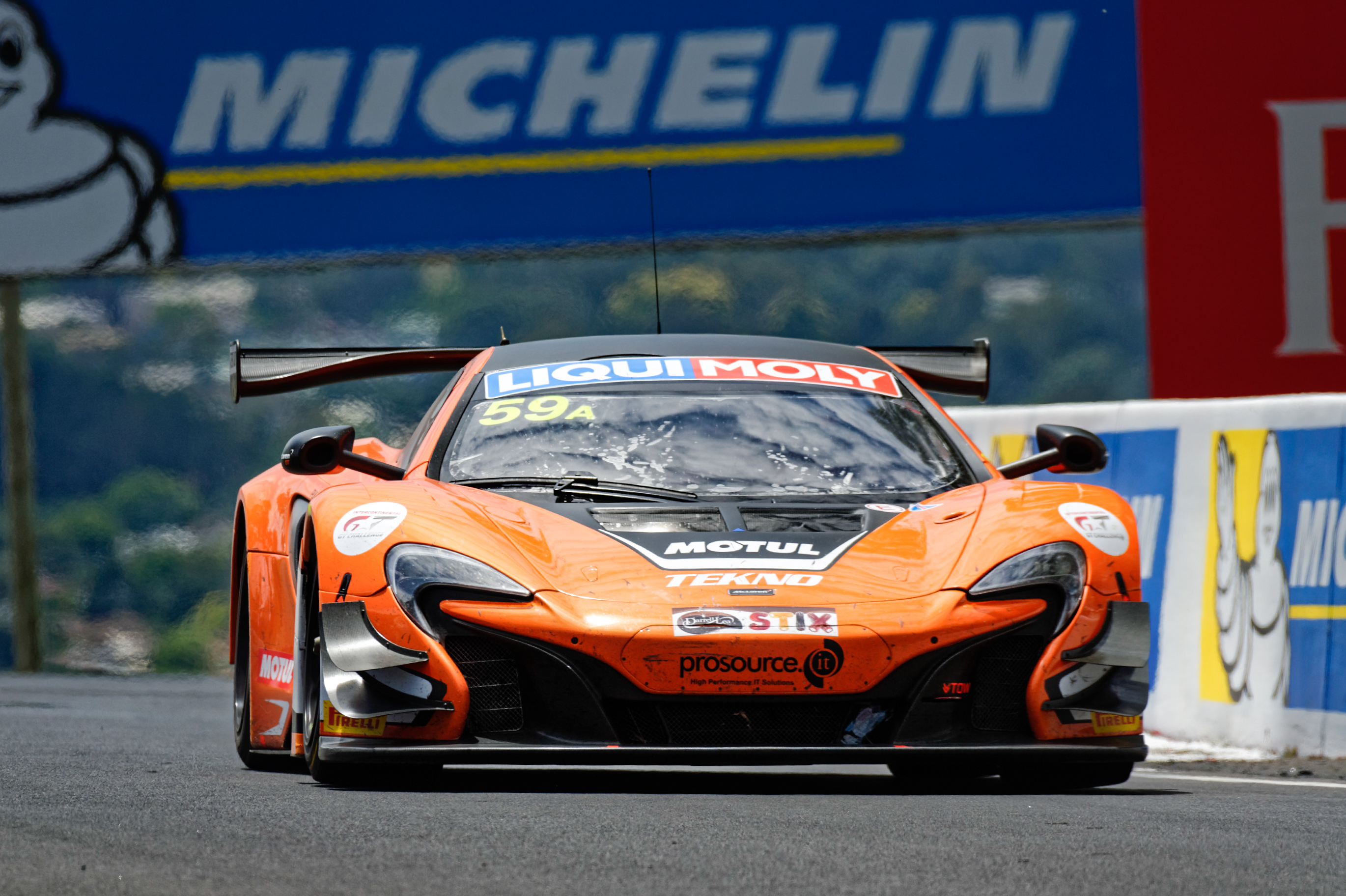
Shane van Gisbergen, Álvaro Parente and Jonathon Webb won the Bathurst 12 Hour, the inaugural event of the Intercontinental GT Challenge, in a McLaren 650S GT3 run by Tekno Autosports.

The 2016 Intercontinental GT Challenge was the first season of the Intercontinental GT Challenge. The season featured three rounds — after the cancellation of the 6 Hours of the Americas - starting with Liqui Moly Bathurst 12 Hour on 7 February and the season concluded with the Sepang 12 Hours on 10 December.

== Calendar ==
On 29 January it was announced that the 6 Hours of the Americas would be cancelled with the official reason a lack of entrants. The test days of the Blancpain GT Series Endurance Cup were only four days after the event, so the European teams would be cutting it close for both events. Instead, the organizers postponed the race for a year, but there were no plans to run the race.

Round	Event	Circuit	Date	Report
1	Liqui Moly Bathurst 12 Hour	Mount Panorama Circuit, Bathurst, Australia	7 February	Report
2	Total 24 Hours of Spa	Circuit de Spa-Francorchamps, Spa, Belgium	30–31 July	Report
3	Sepang 12 Hours	Sepang International Circuit, Sepang, Malaysia	10 December	Report

Also part of the Blancpain GT Series Endurance Cup

== Entry list ==
=== Intercontinental GT Challenge entries ===
Manufacturer	Team	Car	No.	Drivers	Class	Rounds
Audi	(Belgium) Audi Sport Team WRT	R8 LMS	1	(United Kingdom) Will Stevens	P	2
Audi	(Belgium) Audi Sport Team WRT	R8 LMS	1	(Belgium) Dries Vanthoor	P	2
Audi	(Belgium) Audi Sport Team WRT	R8 LMS	1	(Belgium) Frédéric Vervisch	P	2
Audi	(Belgium) Audi Sport Team WRT	R8 LMS	28	(Switzerland) Nico Müller	P	2
Audi	(Belgium) Audi Sport Team WRT	R8 LMS	28	(Germany) René Rast	P	2
Audi	(Belgium) Audi Sport Team WRT	R8 LMS	28	(Belgium) Laurens Vanthoor	P	2
Audi	(Germany) / Phoenix Racing (Note: Car No. 2 entered as Phoenix Racing and cars No. 6, 15 and 16 entered as Audi Sport Team Phoenix.); (Germany) / Audi Sport Team Phoenix	R8 LMS	2	(Australia) Alex Davison	PA	1
Audi	(Germany) / Phoenix Racing; (Germany) / Audi Sport Team Phoenix	R8 LMS	2	(Belgium) Laurens Vanthoor	PA	1
Audi	(Germany) / Phoenix Racing; (Germany) / Audi Sport Team Phoenix	R8 LMS	2	(Germany) Markus Winkelhock	PA	1
Audi	(Germany) / Phoenix Racing; (Germany) / Audi Sport Team Phoenix	R8 LMS	2	(Germany) Markus Winkelhock	PA	1
Audi	(Germany) / Phoenix Racing; (Germany) / Audi Sport Team Phoenix	R8 LMS	6	(Germany) Markus Winkelhock	P	2
Audi	(Germany) / Phoenix Racing; (Germany) / Audi Sport Team Phoenix	R8 LMS	6	(Germany) Christopher Mies	P	2
Audi	(Germany) / Phoenix Racing; (Germany) / Audi Sport Team Phoenix	R8 LMS	6	(Germany) Frank Stippler	P	2
Audi	(Germany) / Phoenix Racing; (Germany) / Audi Sport Team Phoenix	R8 LMS	15	(Netherlands) Robin Frijns	P	3
Audi	(Germany) / Phoenix Racing; (Germany) / Audi Sport Team Phoenix	R8 LMS	15	(Germany) Christopher Haase	P	3
Audi	(Germany) / Phoenix Racing; (Germany) / Audi Sport Team Phoenix	R8 LMS	15	(Belgium) Laurens Vanthoor	P	3
Audi	(Germany) / Phoenix Racing; (Germany) / Audi Sport Team Phoenix	R8 LMS	16	(Germany) Pierre Kaffer	P	3
Audi	(Germany) / Phoenix Racing; (Germany) / Audi Sport Team Phoenix	R8 LMS	16	(Germany) René Rast	P	3
Audi	(Germany) / Phoenix Racing; (Germany) / Audi Sport Team Phoenix	R8 LMS	16	(Germany) Markus Winkelhock	P	3
Audi	(Australia) Melbourne Performance Centre	R8 LMS	74	(Germany) Christopher Haase	PA	1
Audi	(Australia) Melbourne Performance Centre	R8 LMS	74	(Italy) Marco Mapelli	PA	1
Audi	(Australia) Melbourne Performance Centre	R8 LMS	74	(Germany) Christopher Mies	PA	1
Audi	(Australia) Melbourne Performance Centre	R8 LMS	75	(Australia) Steve McLaughlan	PA	1
Audi	(Australia) Melbourne Performance Centre	R8 LMS	75	(Germany) René Rast	PA	1
Audi	(Australia) Melbourne Performance Centre	R8 LMS	75	(Australia) Garth Tander	PA	1
Bentley	(United Kingdom) Bentley Team M-Sport	Continental GT3	7	(France) Vincent Abril	P	2
Bentley	(United Kingdom) Bentley Team M-Sport	Continental GT3	7	(United Kingdom) Steven Kane	P	2
Bentley	(United Kingdom) Bentley Team M-Sport	Continental GT3	7	(United Kingdom) Guy Smith	P	2
Bentley	(United Kingdom) Bentley Team M-Sport	Continental GT3	8	(Belgium) Wolfgang Reip	P	2
Bentley	(United Kingdom) Bentley Team M-Sport	Continental GT3	8	(Spain) Andy Soucek	P	2
Bentley	(United Kingdom) Bentley Team M-Sport	Continental GT3	8	(Belgium) Maxime Soulet	P	2
Bentley	(United Kingdom) Bentley Team M-Sport	Continental GT3	10	(United Kingdom) Matt Bell	PA	1
Bentley	(United Kingdom) Bentley Team M-Sport	Continental GT3	10	(United Kingdom) Steven Kane	PA	1
Bentley	(United Kingdom) Bentley Team M-Sport	Continental GT3	10	(United Kingdom) Guy Smith	PA	1
Bentley	(United Kingdom) Bentley Team M-Sport	Continental GT3	31	(Australia) David Russell	PA	1
Bentley	(United Kingdom) Bentley Team M-Sport	Continental GT3	31	(Spain) Andy Soucek	PA	1
Bentley	(United Kingdom) Bentley Team M-Sport	Continental GT3	31	(Belgium) Maxime Soulet	PA	1
McLaren	(United States) K-PAX Racing	650S GT3	9	(New Zealand) Shane van Gisbergen	P	3
McLaren	(United States) K-PAX Racing	650S GT3	9	(France) Côme Ledogar	P	3
McLaren	(United States) K-PAX Racing	650S GT3	9	(Portugal) Álvaro Parente	P	3
McLaren	(Australia) McElrea Racing	650S GT3	11	(Australia) Matt Campbell	Am	1
McLaren	(Australia) McElrea Racing	650S GT3	11	(Australia) Warren Luff	Am	1
McLaren	(Australia) McElrea Racing	650S GT3	11	(Australia) Tim Slade	Am	1
McLaren	(Australia) McElrea Racing	650S GT3	11	(Australia) Tony Walls	Am	1
McLaren	(Australia) Keltic Racing	650S GT3	37	(New Zealand) Craig Baird	Am	1
McLaren	(Australia) Keltic Racing	650S GT3	37	(Australia) Klark Quinn	Am	1
McLaren	(Australia) Keltic Racing	650S GT3	37	(United Kingdom) Tony Quinn	Am	1
McLaren	(United Kingdom) Garage 59	650S GT3	58	(United Kingdom) Rob Bell	P	2
McLaren	(United Kingdom) Garage 59	650S GT3	58	(New Zealand) Shane van Gisbergen	P	2
McLaren	(United Kingdom) Garage 59	650S GT3	58	(France) Côme Ledogar	P	2
McLaren	(United Kingdom) Garage 59	650S GT3	59	(Switzerland) Alex Fontana	P	2
McLaren	(United Kingdom) Garage 59	650S GT3	59	(United Kingdom) Struan Moore	P	2
McLaren	(United Kingdom) Garage 59	650S GT3	59	(United Kingdom) Andrew Watson	P	2
McLaren	(United Kingdom) Garage 59	650S GT3	60	(Brazil) Pipo Derani	P	2
McLaren	(United Kingdom) Garage 59	650S GT3	60	(Brazil) Bruno Senna	P	2
McLaren	(United Kingdom) Garage 59	650S GT3	60	(United Kingdom) Duncan Tappy	P	2
McLaren	(Australia) Tekno Autosports	650S GT3	59	(New Zealand) Shane van Gisbergen	PA	1
McLaren	(Australia) Tekno Autosports	650S GT3	59	(Portugal) Álvaro Parente	PA	1
McLaren	(Australia) Tekno Autosports	650S GT3	59	(Australia) Jonathon Webb	PA	1
McLaren	(Australia) Tekno Autosports	650S GT3	60	(United Kingdom) Rob Bell	PA	1
McLaren	(Australia) Tekno Autosports	650S GT3	60	(Australia) Will Davison	PA	1
McLaren	(Australia) Tekno Autosports	650S GT3	60	(United Kingdom) Andrew Watson	PA	1
Mercedes-Benz	(Germany) AMG - Team Black Falcon	AMG GT3	00	(Netherlands) Yelmer Buurman	P	2
Mercedes-Benz	(Germany) AMG - Team Black Falcon	AMG GT3	00	(Germany) Maro Engel	P	2
Mercedes-Benz	(Germany) AMG - Team Black Falcon	AMG GT3	00	(Germany) Bernd Schneider	P	2
Mercedes-Benz	(Germany) Mishumotors	SLS AMG GT3	33	(United Kingdom) Alex Kapadia	PA	1
Mercedes-Benz	(Germany) Mishumotors	SLS AMG GT3	33	(Germany) Mirco Schultis	PA	1
Mercedes-Benz	(Germany) Mishumotors	SLS AMG GT3	33	(Germany) Patrick Simon	PA	1
Mercedes-Benz	(Germany) Mishumotors	SLS AMG GT3	33	(Netherlands) Renger van der Zande	PA	1
Mercedes-Benz	(Australia) Erebus Motorsport	SLS AMG GT3	36	(Germany) Nico Bastian	PA	1
Mercedes-Benz	(Australia) Erebus Motorsport	SLS AMG GT3	36	(Germany) Thomas Jäger	PA	1
Mercedes-Benz	(Australia) Erebus Motorsport	SLS AMG GT3	36	(Australia) David Reynolds	PA	1
Mercedes-Benz	(Australia) Erebus Motorsport	SLS AMG GT3	63	(United States) Austin Cindric	PA	1
Mercedes-Benz	(Australia) Erebus Motorsport	SLS AMG GT3	63	(Germany) Maro Engel	PA	1
Mercedes-Benz	(Australia) Erebus Motorsport	SLS AMG GT3	63	(Germany) Bernd Schneider	PA	1
Mercedes-Benz	(Germany) AMG - Team HTP Motorsport	AMG GT3	84	(Austria) Dominik Baumann	P	2
Mercedes-Benz	(Germany) AMG - Team HTP Motorsport	AMG GT3	84	(Germany) Maximilian Buhk	P	2
Mercedes-Benz	(Germany) AMG - Team HTP Motorsport	AMG GT3	84	(Malaysia) Jazeman Jaafar	P	2
Mercedes-Benz	(Germany) AMG - Team HTP Motorsport	AMG GT3	86	(Germany) Maximilian Götz	P	2
Mercedes-Benz	(Germany) AMG - Team HTP Motorsport	AMG GT3	86	(Germany) Thomas Jäger	P	2
Mercedes-Benz	(Germany) AMG - Team HTP Motorsport	AMG GT3	86	(United Kingdom) Gary Paffett	P	2
Mercedes-Benz	(France) AMG - Team AKKA ASP	AMG GT3	88	(Sweden) Felix Rosenqvist	P	2
Mercedes-Benz	(France) AMG - Team AKKA ASP	AMG GT3	88	(France) Tristan Vautier	P	2
Mercedes-Benz	(France) AMG - Team AKKA ASP	AMG GT3	88	(Netherlands) Renger van der Zande	P	2

Icon	Class
P	Pro Cup
PA	Pro-Am Cup
Am	Am Cup

=== Am Drivers entries ===
It is unknown which drivers competed for the Am Drivers' championship at Round 1 at Bathurst, besides those who scored points. No drivers entered for the Am Drivers' championship at Round 3 at Sepang.

Manufacturer	Team	Car	No.	Drivers	Rounds
Aston Martin	Oman Racing Team	V12 Vantage GT3	44	(United Kingdom) Jonathan Adam	2
Aston Martin	Oman Racing Team	V12 Vantage GT3	44	(Oman) Ahmad Al Harthy	2
Aston Martin	Oman Racing Team	V12 Vantage GT3	44	(United Kingdom) Devon Modell	2
Aston Martin	Oman Racing Team	V12 Vantage GT3	44	(United Kingdom) Darren Turner	2
Audi	(France) Saintéloc Racing	R8 LMS	25	(Italy) Marco Bonanomi	2
Audi	(France) Saintéloc Racing	R8 LMS	25	(Belgium) Frédéric Bouvy	2
Audi	(France) Saintéloc Racing	R8 LMS	25	(Belgium) Christian Kelders	2
Audi	(France) Saintéloc Racing	R8 LMS	25	(France) Marc Rostan	2
Audi	(France) Saintéloc Racing	R8 LMS ultra	27	(France) Michael Blanchemain	2
Audi	(France) Saintéloc Racing	R8 LMS ultra	27	(France) Jean-Paul Buffin	2
Audi	(France) Saintéloc Racing	R8 LMS ultra	27	(France) Valentin Hasse-Clot	2
Audi	(France) Saintéloc Racing	R8 LMS ultra	27	(France) Gilles Lallemant	2
Audi	(Czech Republic) ISR	R8 LMS	74	(Switzerland) Philippe Giauque	2
Audi	(Czech Republic) ISR	R8 LMS	74	(France) Henry Hassid	2
Audi	(Czech Republic) ISR	R8 LMS	74	(France) Nicolas Lapierre	2
Audi	(Czech Republic) ISR	R8 LMS	74	(France) Franck Perera	2
Audi	(Australia) Melbourne Performance Centre	R8 LMS	75	(Australia) Steve McLaughlan	1
Audi	(Australia) Melbourne Performance Centre	R8 LMS	75	(Germany) René Rast	1
Audi	(Australia) Melbourne Performance Centre	R8 LMS	75	(Australia) Garth Tander	1
Audi	(New Zealand) International Motorsport	R8 LMS ultra	82	(New Zealand) Rick Armstrong	1
Audi	(New Zealand) International Motorsport	R8 LMS ultra	82	(New Zealand) Andrew Bagnall	1
Audi	(New Zealand) International Motorsport	R8 LMS ultra	82	(New Zealand) Matt Halliday	1
Bentley	(United Kingdom) Team Parker Racing	Continental GT3	24	(United Kingdom) Ian Loggie	2
Bentley	(United Kingdom) Team Parker Racing	Continental GT3	24	(United Kingdom) Callum MacLeod	2
Bentley	(United Kingdom) Team Parker Racing	Continental GT3	24	(United Kingdom) Andy Meyrick	2
Bentley	(United Kingdom) Team Parker Racing	Continental GT3	24	(United Kingdom) Tom Onslow-Cole	2
Bentley	(United Kingdom) Team Parker Racing	Continental GT3	30	(United Kingdom) Chris Harris	2
Bentley	(United Kingdom) Team Parker Racing	Continental GT3	30	(South Africa) David Perel	2
Bentley	(United Kingdom) Team Parker Racing	Continental GT3	30	(United Kingdom) Derek Pierce	2
Bentley	(United Kingdom) Team Parker Racing	Continental GT3	30	(Sweden) Carl Rosenblad	2
BMW	(Belgium) Boutsen Ginion	M6 GT3	12	(France) Julien Darras	2
BMW	(Belgium) Boutsen Ginion	M6 GT3	12	(Luxembourg) Olivier Grotz	2
BMW	(Belgium) Boutsen Ginion	M6 GT3	12	(Saudi Arabia) Karim Ojjeh	2
BMW	(Belgium) Boutsen Ginion	M6 GT3	12	(France) Arno Santamato	2
Ferrari	(Switzerland) Kessel Racing	488 GT3	11	(Italy) Alessandro Bonacini	2
Ferrari	(Switzerland) Kessel Racing	488 GT3	11	(Poland) Michał Broniszewski	2
Ferrari	(Switzerland) Kessel Racing	488 GT3	11	(Italy) Giacomo Piccini	2
Ferrari	(Switzerland) Kessel Racing	488 GT3	11	(Italy) Andrea Rizzoli	2
Ferrari	(France) Classic & Modern Racing	458 Italia GT3	41	(France) Romain Brandela	2
Ferrari	(France) Classic & Modern Racing	458 Italia GT3	41	(France) Timothé Buret	2
Ferrari	(France) Classic & Modern Racing	458 Italia GT3	41	(Belgium) Bernard Delhez	2
Ferrari	(France) Classic & Modern Racing	458 Italia GT3	41	(France) Mickaël Petit	2
Ferrari	(France) Classic & Modern Racing	458 Italia GT3	42	(France) Sylvain Debs	2
Ferrari	(France) Classic & Modern Racing	458 Italia GT3	42	(France) David Loger	2
Ferrari	(France) Classic & Modern Racing	458 Italia GT3	42	(France) Eric Mouez	2
Ferrari	(France) Classic & Modern Racing	458 Italia GT3	42	(France) Thomas Nicolle	2
Ferrari	(Italy) Kaspersky Motorsport (Note: Car No. 49 entered as Kaspersky Motorsport.) (Italy) AF Corse (Note: Cars No. 51, 52 and 53 entered as AF Corse.) (Austria) AT Racing (Note: Car No. 55 entered as AT Racing under Austrian licence.)	458 Italia GT3	49	(Portugal) Rui Águas	2
Ferrari	(Italy) Kaspersky Motorsport (Italy) AF Corse (Austria) AT Racing	458 Italia GT3	49	(Belgium) Stéphane Lémeret	2
Ferrari	(Italy) Kaspersky Motorsport (Italy) AF Corse (Austria) AT Racing	458 Italia GT3	49	(Russia) Alexander Moiseev	2
Ferrari	(Italy) Kaspersky Motorsport (Italy) AF Corse (Austria) AT Racing	458 Italia GT3	49	(Italy) Davide Rizzo	2
Ferrari	(Italy) Kaspersky Motorsport (Italy) AF Corse (Austria) AT Racing	488 GT3	51	(Italy) Matteo Cressoni	2
Ferrari	(Italy) Kaspersky Motorsport (Italy) AF Corse (Austria) AT Racing	488 GT3	51	(Portugal) Francisco Guedes	2
Ferrari	(Italy) Kaspersky Motorsport (Italy) AF Corse (Austria) AT Racing	488 GT3	51	(United States) Peter Mann	2
Ferrari	(Italy) Kaspersky Motorsport (Italy) AF Corse (Austria) AT Racing	488 GT3	51	(Italy) Rino Mastronardi	2
Ferrari	(Italy) Kaspersky Motorsport (Italy) AF Corse (Austria) AT Racing	488 GT3	52	(United Kingdom) Duncan Cameron	2
Ferrari	(Italy) Kaspersky Motorsport (Italy) AF Corse (Austria) AT Racing	488 GT3	52	(Republic of Ireland) Matt Griffin	2
Ferrari	(Italy) Kaspersky Motorsport (Italy) AF Corse (Austria) AT Racing	488 GT3	52	(Italy) Riccardo Ragazzi	2
Ferrari	(Italy) Kaspersky Motorsport (Italy) AF Corse (Austria) AT Racing	488 GT3	52	(United Kingdom) Andrew Scott	2
Ferrari	(Italy) Kaspersky Motorsport (Italy) AF Corse (Austria) AT Racing	488 GT3	53	(Monaco) Olivier Beretta	2
Ferrari	(Italy) Kaspersky Motorsport (Italy) AF Corse (Austria) AT Racing	488 GT3	53	(Italy) Lorenzo Bontempelli	2
Ferrari	(Italy) Kaspersky Motorsport (Italy) AF Corse (Austria) AT Racing	488 GT3	53	(Italy) Giancarlo Fisichella	2
Ferrari	(Italy) Kaspersky Motorsport (Italy) AF Corse (Austria) AT Racing	488 GT3	53	(Japan) Motoaki Ishikawa	2
Ferrari	(Italy) Kaspersky Motorsport (Italy) AF Corse (Austria) AT Racing	488 GT3	55	(Italy) Francesco Castellacci	2
Ferrari	(Italy) Kaspersky Motorsport (Italy) AF Corse (Austria) AT Racing	488 GT3	55	(Italy) Marco Cioci	2
Ferrari	(Italy) Kaspersky Motorsport (Italy) AF Corse (Austria) AT Racing	488 GT3	55	(Switzerland) Thomas Flohr	2
Ferrari	(Italy) Kaspersky Motorsport (Italy) AF Corse (Austria) AT Racing	488 GT3	55	(Italy) Piergiuseppe Perazzini	2
Ferrari	(Germany) Rinaldi Racing	488 GT3	333	(Germany) Pierre Ehret	2
Ferrari	(Germany) Rinaldi Racing	488 GT3	333	(Germany) Alexander Mattschull	2
Ferrari	(Germany) Rinaldi Racing	488 GT3	333	(Russia) Rinat Salikhov	2
Ferrari	(Germany) Rinaldi Racing	488 GT3	333	(Germany) Marco Seefried	2
Lamborghini	(Australia) Lago Racing	Gallardo R-EX	32	(Australia) Steve Owen	1
Lamborghini	(Australia) Lago Racing	Gallardo R-EX	32	(Australia) Luke Youlden	1
Lamborghini	(Australia) Lago Racing	Gallardo R-EX	32	(Australia) Roger Lago	1
Lamborghini	(Australia) Lago Racing	Gallardo R-EX	132	(Australia) Roger Lago	2
Lamborghini	(Australia) Lago Racing	Gallardo R-EX	132	(Australia) Steve Owen	2
Lamborghini	(Australia) Lago Racing	Gallardo R-EX	132	(Australia) David Russell	2
Lamborghini	(Australia) Lago Racing	Gallardo R-EX	132	(Australia) Jonathon Webb	2
Lamborghini	(Austria) GRT Grasser Racing Team	Huracán GT3	63	(Italy) Diego Alessi	2
Lamborghini	(Austria) GRT Grasser Racing Team	Huracán GT3	63	(Denmark) Dennis Andersen	2
Lamborghini	(Austria) GRT Grasser Racing Team	Huracán GT3	63	(Denmark) Anders Fjordbach	2
Lamborghini	(Austria) GRT Grasser Racing Team	Huracán GT3	63	(Germany) Nicolas Pohler	2
Lamborghini	(Slovakia) ARC Bratislava	Huracán GT3	69	(Slovakia) Miro Konôpka	2
Lamborghini	(Slovakia) ARC Bratislava	Huracán GT3	69	(Poland) Andrzej Lewandowski	2
Lamborghini	(Slovakia) ARC Bratislava	Huracán GT3	69	(Slovakia) Zdeno Mikuláško	2
Lamborghini	(Slovakia) ARC Bratislava	Huracán GT3	69	(Poland) Teodor Myszkowski	2
Lamborghini	(United Kingdom) Barwell Motorsport	Huracán GT3	78	(United Kingdom) Marco Attard	2
Lamborghini	(United Kingdom) Barwell Motorsport	Huracán GT3	78	(United Kingdom) Tom Kimber-Smith	2
Lamborghini	(United Kingdom) Barwell Motorsport	Huracán GT3	78	(Russia) Leo Machitski	2
Lamborghini	(United Kingdom) Barwell Motorsport	Huracán GT3	78	(Italy) Marco Mapelli	2
Lamborghini	(United Kingdom) Barwell Motorsport	Huracán GT3	666	(United Kingdom) Oliver Gavin	2
Lamborghini	(United Kingdom) Barwell Motorsport	Huracán GT3	666	(United Kingdom) Phil Keen	2
Lamborghini	(United Kingdom) Barwell Motorsport	Huracán GT3	666	(United Kingdom) Jon Minshaw	2
Lamborghini	(United Kingdom) Barwell Motorsport	Huracán GT3	666	(United Kingdom) Joe Osborne	2
Lamborghini	(Germany) Attempto Racing	Huracán GT3	100	(Belgium) Louis Machiels	2
Lamborghini	(Germany) Attempto Racing	Huracán GT3	100	(Netherlands) Jeroen Mul	2
Lamborghini	(Germany) Attempto Racing	Huracán GT3	100	(Netherlands) Max van Splunteren	2
Lamborghini	(Germany) Attempto Racing	Huracán GT3	100	(Italy) Giovanni Venturini	2
Mercedes-Benz	(Germany) Black Falcon	AMG GT3	56	(Saudi Arabia) Abdulaziz Bin Turki Al Faisal	2
Mercedes-Benz	(Germany) Black Falcon	AMG GT3	56	(Spain) Daniel Juncadella	2
Mercedes-Benz	(Germany) Black Falcon	AMG GT3	56	(United Kingdom) Oliver Morley	2
Mercedes-Benz	(Germany) Black Falcon	AMG GT3	56	(Spain) Miguel Toril	2
Mercedes-Benz	(France) AKKA ASP	AMG GT3	89	(France) Laurent Cazenave	2
Mercedes-Benz	(France) AKKA ASP	AMG GT3	89	(United Kingdom) Michael Lyons	2
Mercedes-Benz	(France) AKKA ASP	AMG GT3	89	(France) Morgan Moullin-Traffort	2
Mercedes-Benz	(France) AKKA ASP	AMG GT3	89	(Switzerland) Daniele Perfetti	2
Porsche	(France) IMSA Performance	911 GT3 R	76	(France) Thierry Cornac	2
Porsche	(France) IMSA Performance	911 GT3 R	76	(France) Raymond Narac	2
Porsche	(France) IMSA Performance	911 GT3 R	76	(France) Maxime Jousse	2
Porsche	(France) IMSA Performance	911 GT3 R	76	(France) Patrick Pilet	2
Porsche	(Germany) Attempto Racing	911 GT3 R	77	(France) Nicolas Armindo	2
Porsche	(Germany) Attempto Racing	911 GT3 R	77	(France) Kévin Estre	2
Porsche	(Germany) Attempto Racing	911 GT3 R	77	(Germany) Jürgen Häring	2
Porsche	(Germany) Attempto Racing	911 GT3 R	77	(France) Clément Mateu	2

Co-drivers not competing for Am Drivers' championship.

== Race results ==
Rnd.	Circuit	Pole position	IGTC winners	Am winners	Winning Manufacturer
1	(Australia) Bathurst	(Australia) No. 59 Tekno Autosports	(Australia) No. 59 Tekno Autosports	(Australia) No. 75 Melbourne Performance Centre	McLaren
1	(Australia) Bathurst	(New Zealand) Shane van Gisbergen (Portugal) Álvaro Parente (Australia) Jonathon Webb	(New Zealand) Shane van Gisbergen (Portugal) Álvaro Parente (Australia) Jonathon Webb	(Australia) Steve McLaughlan	McLaren
2	(Belgium) Spa-Francorchamps	(Belgium) No. 28 Audi Sport Team WRT	(France) No. 88 AMG - Team AKKA ASP	(France) No. 76 IMSA Performance	Mercedes-Benz
2	(Belgium) Spa-Francorchamps	(Switzerland) Nico Müller (Germany) René Rast (Belgium) Laurens Vanthoor	(Sweden) Felix Rosenqvist (France) Tristan Vautier (Netherlands) Renger van der Zande	(France) Thierry Cornac	Mercedes-Benz
3	(Malaysia) Sepang	(United States) No. 9 K-PAX Racing	(Germany) No. 15 Audi Sport Team Phoenix	No entries	Audi
3	(Malaysia) Sepang	(New Zealand) Shane van Gisbergen (France) Côme Ledogar (Portugal) Álvaro Parente	(Netherlands) Robin Frijns (Germany) Christopher Haase (Belgium) Laurens Vanthoor	No entries	Audi

== Championship standings ==
Scoring system

Championship points were awarded for the first ten positions in each race. Entries were required to complete 75% of the winning car's race distance in order to be classified and earn points. Individual drivers were required to participate for a minimum of 25 minutes in order to earn championship points in any race. A manufacturer only received points for its two highest placed cars in each round.

Position	**1st**	**2nd**	**3rd**	**4th**	**5th**	**6th**	**7th**	**8th**	**9th**	**10th**
Points	25	18	15	12	10	8	6	4	2	1

=== Drivers' championships ===
The results indicate the classification relative to other drivers in the series, not the classification in the race.

Pos.	Driver	Manufacturer	BAT (Australia)	SPA (Belgium)	SEP (Malaysia)	Total
1	(Belgium) Laurens Vanthoor	Audi	3	**2**	1	58
2	(Germany) René Rast	Audi	6	**2**	2	44
3	(New Zealand) Shane van Gisbergen	McLaren	**1**	9	**3**	42
4	(Portugal) Álvaro Parente	McLaren	**1**		**3**	40
5	(Germany) Markus Winkelhock	Audi	3	11	2	33
6	(United Kingdom) Steven Kane (United Kingdom) Guy Smith	Bentley	2	6		26
7	(Netherlands) Renger van der Zande	Mercedes-Benz	Ret	1		25
7	(Germany) Christopher Haase	Audi	Ret		1	25
7	(Australia) Jonathon Webb	McLaren	**1**			25
7	(Sweden) Felix Rosenqvist (France) Tristan Vautier	Mercedes-Benz		1		25
7	(Netherlands) Robin Frijns	Audi			1	25
7	(Spain) Andy Soucek (Belgium) Maxime Soulet	Bentley	5	3		25
8	(Germany) Thomas Jäger	Mercedes-Benz	4	4		24
9	(United Kingdom) Matt Bell	Bentley	2			18
9	(Switzerland) Nico Müller	Audi		**2**		18
9	(Germany) Pierre Kaffer	Audi			2	18
10	(France) Côme Ledogar	McLaren		9	**3**	17
11	(Australia) Alex Davison	Audi	3			15
11	(Belgium) Wolfgang Reip	Bentley		3		15
12	(Germany) Nico Bastian (Australia) David Reynolds	Mercedes-Benz	4			12
12	(Germany) Maximilian Götz (United Kingdom) Gary Paffett	Mercedes-Benz		4		12
13	(Australia) David Russell	Bentley	5			10
13	(Austria) Dominik Baumann (Germany) Maximilian Buhk (Malaysia) Jazeman Jaafar	Mercedes-Benz		5		10
14	(Australia) Steve McLaughlan (Australia) Garth Tander	Audi	6			8
14	(France) Vincent Abril	Bentley		6		8
14	(United Kingdom) Rob Bell	McLaren	7	9		8
15	(United Kingdom) Andrew Watson	McLaren	7	Ret		6
15	(Australia) Will Davison	McLaren	7			6
15	(Germany) Maro Engel (Germany) Bernd Schneider	Mercedes-Benz	Ret	7		6
15	(Netherlands) Yelmer Buurman	Mercedes-Benz		7		6
16	(United Kingdom) Will Stevens (Belgium) Dries Vanthoor (Belgium) Frédéric Vervisch	Audi		8		4
17	(Brazil) Pipo Derani (Brazil) Bruno Senna (United Kingdom) Duncan Tappy	McLaren		10		1
	(Germany) Christopher Mies	Audi	Ret	11		0
	(Germany) Frank Stippler	Audi		11		0
	(United States) Austin Cindric	Mercedes-Benz	Ret			
	(New Zealand) Craig Baird (Australia) Klark Quinn (United Kingdom) Tony Quinn	McLaren	Ret			
	(United Kingdom) Alex Kapadia (Germany) Mirco Schultis (Germany) Patrick Simon	Mercedes-Benz	Ret			
	(Italy) Marco Mapelli	Audi	Ret			
	(Australia) Matt Campbell (Australia) Warren Luff (Australia) Tim Slade (Australia) Tony Walls	McLaren	Ret			
	(Switzerland) Alex Fontana (United Kingdom) Struan Moore	McLaren		Ret		
Pos.	Driver	Manufacturer	BAT (Australia)	SPA (Belgium)	SEP (Malaysia)	Points

Colour	Result
Gold	Winner
Silver	Second place
Bronze	Third place
Green	Points classification
Blue	Non-points classification
Blue	Non-classified finish (NC)
Purple	Retired, not classified (Ret)
Red	Did not qualify (DNQ)
Red	Did not pre-qualify (DNPQ)
Black	Disqualified (DSQ)
White	Did not start (DNS)
White	Withdrew (WD)
White	Race cancelled (C)
Blank	Did not practice (DNP)
Blank	Did not arrive (DNA)
Blank	Excluded (EX)

**Bold** – Pole
Italics – Fastest Lap

==== Am Drivers ====
Pos.	Driver	Manufacturer	BAT (Australia)	SPA (Belgium)	SEP (Malaysia)	Total
1	(Australia) Steve McLaughlan	Audi	**1**			25
1	(France) Thierry Cornac	Porsche		1		25
2	(Australia) Roger Lago	Lamborghini	2	10		19
3	(Switzerland) Philippe Giauque (France) Henry Hassid	Audi		2		18
4	(New Zealand) Rick Armstrong	Audi	3			15
4	(United Kingdom) Jon Minshaw	Lamborghini		3		15
5	(Switzerland) Daniele Perfetti	Mercedes-Benz		4		12
6	(Poland) Michał Broniszewski	Ferrari		5		10
7	(Oman) Ahmad Al Harthy	Aston Martin		6		8
8	(United Kingdom) Marco Attard (Russia) Leo Machitski	Lamborghini		7		6
9	(United Kingdom) Oliver Morley	Mercedes-Benz		8		4
10	(Portugal) Francisco Guedes (United States) Peter Mann (Italy) Rino Mastronardi	Ferrari		9		2
	(Germany) Pierre Ehret (Germany) Alexander Mattschull (Russia) Rinat Salikhov	Ferrari		11		0
	(Slovakia) Miro Konôpka (Poland) Andrzej Lewandowski (Poland) Teodor Myszkowski	Lamborghini		12		0
	(Denmark) Dennis Andersen	Lamborghini		13		0
	(Belgium) Christian Kelders (France) Marc Rostan	Audi		14		0
	(United Kingdom) Duncan Cameron	Ferrari		15		0
	(France) Michael Blanchemain (France) Jean-Paul Buffin (France) Gilles Lallemant	Audi		16		0
	(Belgium) Louis Machiels	Lamborghini		17		0
	(United Kingdom) Chris Harris (South Africa) David Perel (United Kingdom) Derek Pierce	Bentley		18		0
	(Switzerland) Thomas Flohr (Italy) Piergiuseppe Perazzini	Ferrari		Ret		
	(Saudi Arabia) Karim Ojjeh	BMW		Ret		
	(Belgium) Stéphane Lémeret (Russia) Alexander Moiseev (Italy) Davide Rizzo	Ferrari		Ret		
	(France) Romain Brandela (Belgium) Bernard Delhez	Ferrari		Ret		
	(France) Sylvain Debs (France) David Loger	Ferrari		Ret		
	(United Kingdom) Ian Loggie	Bentley		**Ret**		
	(Germany) Jürgen Häring (France) Clément Mateu	Porsche		Ret		
	(Italy) Lorenzo Bontempelli (Japan) Motoaki Ishikawa	Ferrari		Ret		
Pos.	Driver	Manufacturer	BAT (Australia)	SPA (Belgium)	SEP (Malaysia)	Points

=== Manufacturers' championship ===
Pos.	Manufacturer	Car	BAT (Australia)	SPA (Belgium)	SEP (Malaysia)	Total
1	Audi	R8 LMS	3	**2**	1	88
1	Audi	R8 LMS	6	8	2	88
2	Bentley	Continental GT3	2	3		51
2	Bentley	Continental GT3	5	6		51
3	Mercedes-Benz	SLS AMG GT3/AMG GT3	4	1		49
3	Mercedes-Benz	SLS AMG GT3/AMG GT3	Ret	4		49
3	McLaren	650S GT3	**1**	9	**3**	49
3	McLaren	650S GT3	7	10		49
Pos.	Manufacturer	Car	BAT (Australia)	SPA (Belgium)	SEP (Malaysia)	Points

== See also ==
- Intercontinental GT Challenge
