= Phoenix Racing =

Phoenix Racing is the name of:

- Phoenix Racing (NASCAR team) (established in 1990), defunct American racing team
- Phoenix Racing (German racing team) (established in 1999), German racing team
