= 2016 Sepang 12 Hours =

Race details
Date	10 December 2016
Location	Sepang, Malaysia
Course	5.543 km (3.444 mi)
Weather	Qualifying: Sunny; Race: Changeable
- Race

Pole
Driver	(France) Frédéric Makowiecki	(Germany) Manthey Racing
Time	2:02.634

Podium
First	(Netherlands) Robin Frijns (Germany) Christopher Haase (Belgium) Laurens Vanthoor	(Germany) Audi Sport Team Phoenix
Second	(New Zealand) Earl Bamber (France) Patrick Pilet (United Kingdom) Nick Tandy	(Germany) Manthey Racing
Third	(Germany) Pierre Kaffer (Germany) René Rast (Germany) Markus Winkelhock	(Germany) Audi Sport Team Phoenix

The 2016 Motul Sepang 12 Hours was the seventeenth Sepang 12 Hours race held on Sepang International Circuit on 10 December 2016. The race was contested with GT3-spec cars, GTC-spec cars, GT4 (Supersport)-spec cars, MARC cars and touring cars. This was the second Sepang 12 Hours race organized by the Stéphane Ratel Organisation (SRO). The race was also the third and final round of the inaugural Intercontinental GT Challenge.

The race was won by the Audi R8 LMS run by Audi Sport Team Phoenix. Driven by Robin Frijns, Christopher Haase and Laurens Vanthoor. The race victory saw Vanthoor win the inaugural drivers championship. Supported by third-placed teammates Pierre Kaffer, René Rast and Markus Winkelhock, Audi won the manufacturers championship.

== Event format ==
Day	Session	Time/distance
Thursday (8 December)	Paid Practice (GT3/GTC)	120 minutes
Thursday (8 December)	Paid Practice (GT4/SP/TP/TC/MARC/Others)	120 minutes
Thursday (8 December)	Free Practice 1	120 minutes
Thursday (8 December)	Free Practice 2	120 minutes
Friday (9 December)	Free Practice 3	120 minutes
Friday (9 December)	Qualifying	60 minutes
Friday (9 December)	Top 15 Shootout	15 minutes
Saturday (10 December)	Race	12 hours

== Race results ==
Class winners in bold.

Pos.	Class	No.	Drivers	Team	Car	Laps	Time/Retired
1	**GT3 Pro**	**15**	(Netherlands) **Robin Frijns** (Germany) **Christopher Haase** (Belgium) **Laurens Vanthoor**	(Germany) **Audi Sport Team Phoenix**	**Audi R8 LMS**	**305**	**12:01:33.824**
2	GT3 Pro	911	(New Zealand) Earl Bamber (France) Patrick Pilet (United Kingdom) Nick Tandy	(Germany) Manthey Racing	Porsche 911 GT3 R	304	+1 Lap
3	GT3 Pro	16	(Germany) Pierre Kaffer (Germany) René Rast (Germany) Markus Winkelhock	(Germany) Audi Sport Team Phoenix	Audi R8 LMS	304	+1 Lap
4	GT3 Pro	50	(Thailand) Pasin Lathouras (Italy) Alessandro Pier Guidi (Italy) Michele Rugolo	(Switzerland) Spirit of Race SA	Ferrari 488 GT3	303	+2 Laps
5	GT3 Pro	912	(Denmark) Michael Christensen (Austria) Richard Lietz (France) Frédéric Makowiecki	(Germany) Manthey Racing	Porsche 911 GT3 R	302	+3 Laps
6	**GT3 Pro-Am**	**35**	(Taiwan) **Morris Chen** (Japan) **Shinya Hosokawa** (Japan) **Hiroki Yoshida** (Japan) **Hiroki Yoshimoto**	(Taiwan) **HubAuto Racing**	**Ferrari 488 GT3**	**297**	**+8 Laps**
7	GT3 Pro-Am	11	(Thailand) Piti Bhirombhakdi (Netherlands) Carlo van Dam (Thailand) Tanart Sathienthirakul (Hong Kong) Frank Yu	(Thailand) Singha Motorsport Team	Ferrari 488 GT3	297	+8 Laps
8	GT3 Pro	88	(Japan) Kazuki Hiramine (Japan) Manabu Orido (South Africa) Adrian Zaugg	(Japan) JLOC	Lamborghini Huracán GT3	296	+9 Laps
9	GT3 Pro-Am	27	(Malaysia) Dominic Ang (Malaysia) Adrian Henry D'Silva (Australia) Garnet Patterson	(Malaysia) Nexus Infinity	Ferrari 458 Italia GT3	296	+9 Laps
10	GT3 Pro	9	(New Zealand) Shane van Gisbergen (France) Côme Ledogar (Portugal) Álvaro Parente	(United States) K-PAX Racing	McLaren 650S GT3	290	+15 Laps
11	**GT3 Am**	**75**	(Italy) **Stefano Colombo** (Singapore) **Gregory Teo** (Indonesia) **David Tjiptobiantoro**	(Singapore) **T2 Motorsports**	**Ferrari 488 GT3**	**289**	**+16 Laps**
12	**GTC Pro-Am**	**26**	(Australia) **Daniel Bilski** (Netherlands) **Henk Kiks** (Netherlands) **Peter Kox**	(Thailand) **B-Quick Racing Team**	**Audi R8 LMS Cup**	**288**	**+17 Laps**
13	GT3 Pro-Am	52	(Japan) Taku Bamba (Japan) Naoki Hattori (Japan) Takayuki Hiranuma (Japan) Shogo Mitsuyama	(Japan) SAITAMA TOYOPET Green Brave	Mercedes-Benz SLS AMG GT3	286	+19 Laps
14	GTC Pro-Am	67	(Netherlands) Rik Breukers (Singapore) Wee Lim Keong (Malaysia) Melvin Moh	(San Marino) GDL Racing Team Asia	Lamborghini Huracán LP 620-2 Super Trofeo	286	+19 Laps
15	**MARC**	**93**	(Australia) **Jake Camilleri** (Australia) **Morgan Haber** (Australia) **Rob Thomson**	**MARC Cars Australia**	**MARC Mazda3 V8**	**281**	**+24 Laps**
16	MARC	91	(Papua New Guinea) Keith Kassulke (Australia) Hadrian Morrall (Australia) Nicholas Rowe	MARC Cars Australia	MARC Focus V8	279	+26 Laps
17	**GT4**	**69**	(United Kingdom) **Darren Burke** (Malaysia) **Zen Low** (United Kingdom) **Dan Wells**	(Malaysia) **Ayelzo Ecotint Racing**	**Ginetta G55 GT4**	**271**	**+34 Laps**
18	**GT4S**	**39**	(Japan) **Teruhiko Hamano** (Japan) **Makoto Hotta** (Japan) **Ryohei Sakaguchi**	(Japan) **Muta Racing TWS RC350**	**Lexus RC350**	**266**	**+39 Laps**
19	GTC Pro-Am	333	(Belgium) Jean-Michel Gerome (Malaysia) Mitchell Gilbert (France) Philippe Richard	(Belgium) SpeedLover	Porsche 911 GT3 Cup	265	+40 Laps
20	GT4	55	(United Kingdom) Tom Hibbert (United Kingdom) Charlie Robertson (United Kingdom) Colin White	(United Kingdom) Simpson Motorsport	Ginetta G55 GT4	263	+42 Laps
21	**Touring**	**100**	(Japan) **Takashi Ito** (Malaysia) **Kenny Lee** (Japan) **Hitoshi Matsui** (Japan) **Takashi Oi**	(Japan) **AMUSE & SPV Racing**	**Toyota GT86**	**257**	**+48 Laps**
22	Touring	77	(Australia) Jim Hunter (Australia) Grant Johnson (Australia) Allan Letcher (Australia) Andrew Macpherson	(Australia) Jim Hunter Motorsport	Subaru Impreza STI 2.0	249	+56 Laps
23	Touring	7	(Singapore) Teh Kian Boon (Singapore) Ong Wai Kwong Darren (Singapore) Toe Teow Heng	(Singapore) Team ST Powered	Honda Civic Type R	245	+60 Laps
24	GT3 Pro	30	(Japan) Hiroaki Nagai (Japan) Koki Saga (Japan) Kota Sasaki	(Japan) apr	Toyota Prius (ZVW50)	222	+83 Laps
Ret	**TC**	**65**	(Netherlands) **Ate Dirk de Jong** (Malaysia) **Douglas Khoo** (Japan) **Takuya Shirasaka** (Malaysia) **Naoto Takeda**	(Malaysia) **Viper Niza Racing**	**SEAT León TCR**	**201**	**+104 Laps**

== See also ==
- Sepang 12 Hours
- Sepang International Circuit
