= Scherer Sport PHX =

German racing team

(Germany) Scherer Sport PHX
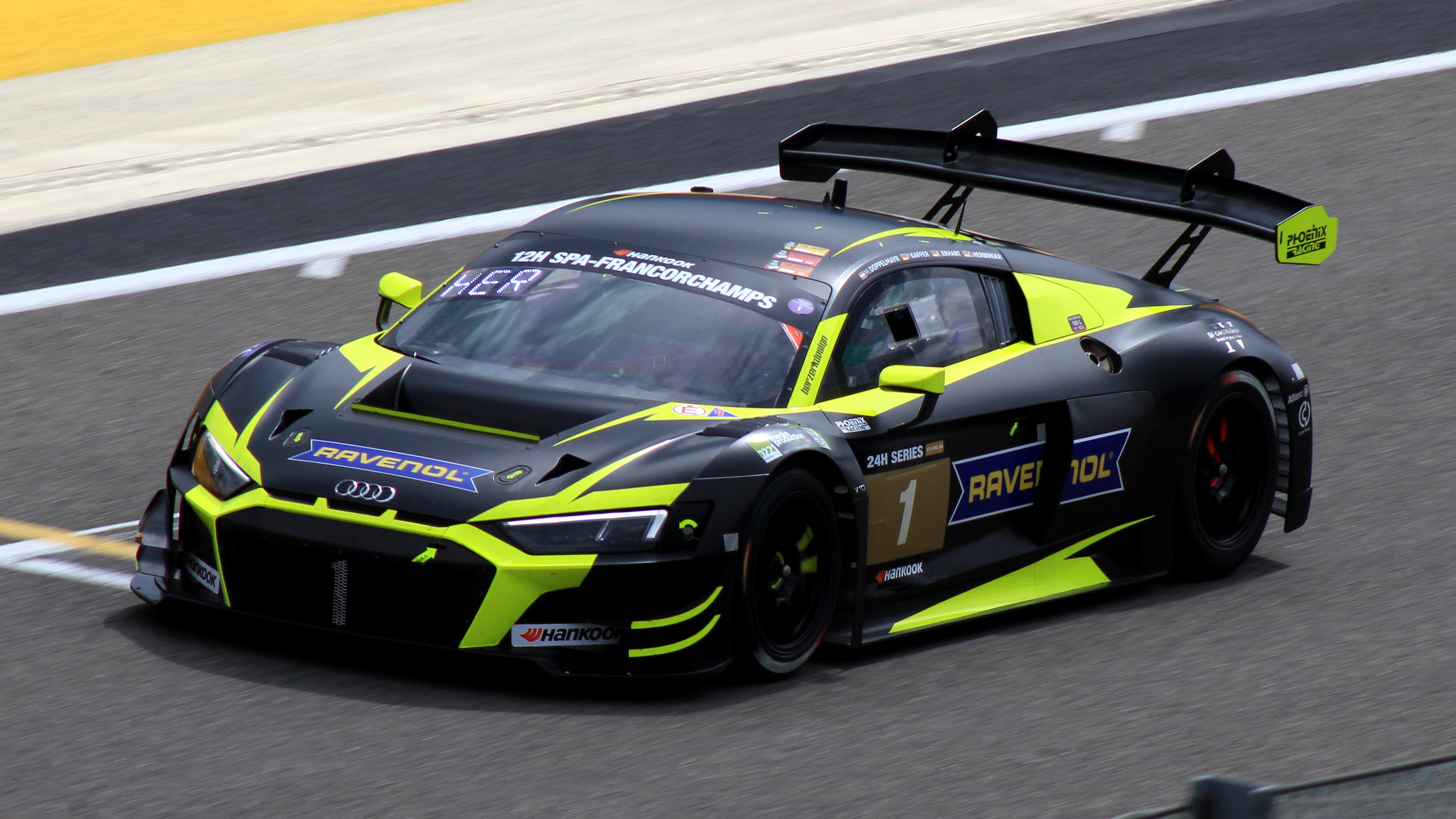
- Founded: 1999
- Team principal(s): Ernst Moser
- Current series: Nürburgring Endurance Series; 24H Series; Porsche Carrera Cup Germany
- Former series: German Supertouring Championship; Porsche Carrera Cup; FIA GT1 World Championship; FIA GT3 European Championship; FIA GT Series; Blancpain Endurance Series; ADAC GT Masters; DTM Trophy; Deutsche Tourenwagen Masters; Le Mans Cup; TCR Asia Series
- Teams' Championships: 1 (DTM, 2013)
- Drivers' Championships: 2 (DTM Martin Tomczyk, Mike Rockenfeller)
- Website: https://www.scherer-sport.de/motorsport

Scherer Sport PHX is a motor racing team based in Meuspath in Germany. The team competes in series such as the GT World Challenge Europe and Nürburgring Langstrecken-Serie and was the winner of the 2022 24 Hours of Nürburgring. Known as Phoenix Racing or Team Phoenix for much of its life, the Scherer Gruppe took over the racing team in 2023, changing its name to Scherer Sport PHX.

== History ==
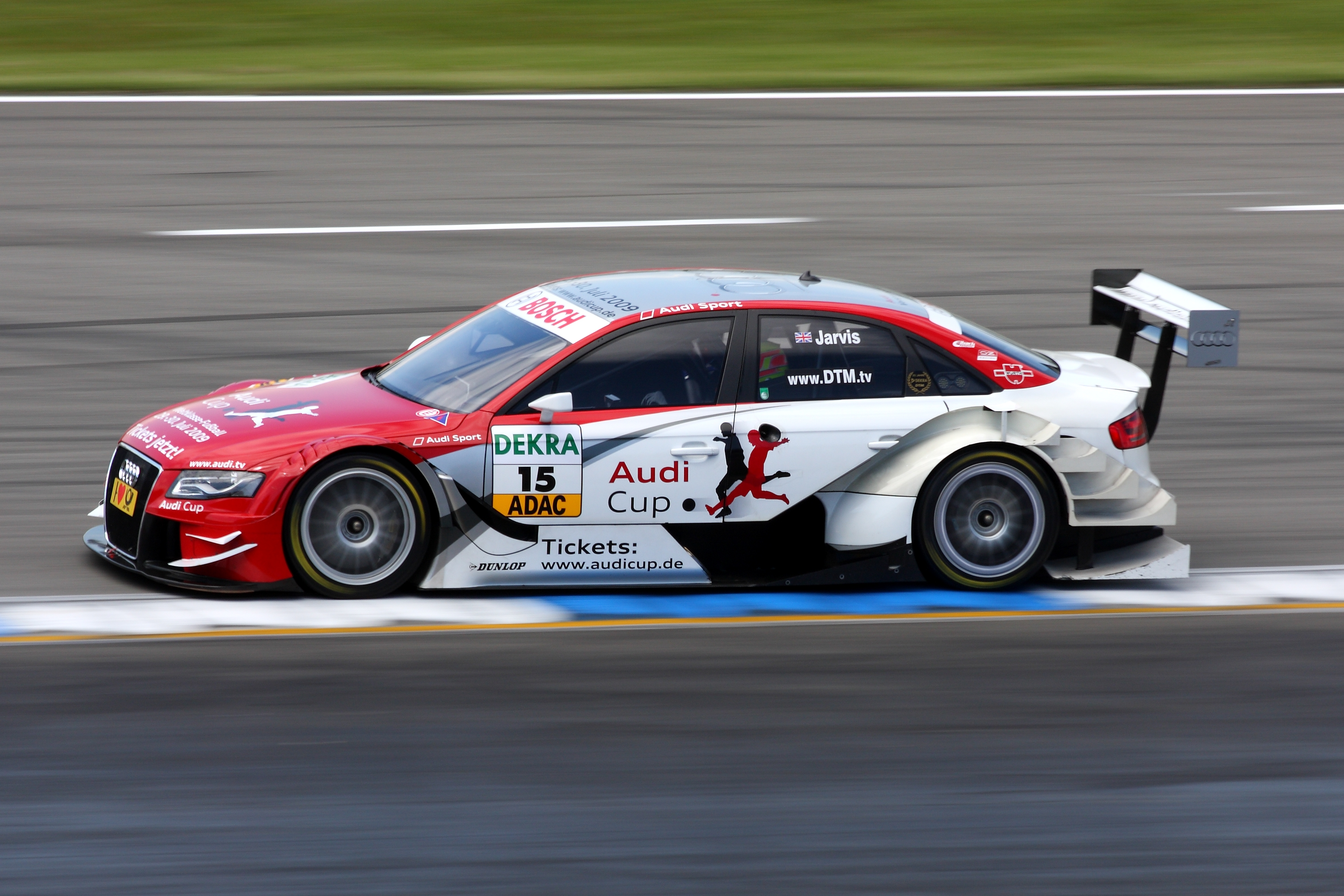
Oliver Jarvis racing for Audi Sport Team Phoenix in 2009

Phoenix Racing founder Ernst Moser, hailing from Swabia, had a short stint as racer in the 1980 German motorcycle Championship for which he lacked money and contacts. Following years of wheeling and dealing in the Middle East, including supply transports for Iran–Iraq War, he returned to racing. In the 1988 Deutsche Tourenwagen Meisterschaft Moser serviced the AMG-Mercedes Mercedes 190E 2.3-16 of Johnny Cecotto, motorcycle world champion in the 1970s, and idol of young Moser. Soon, Moser became chief mechanic and team leader of the West-sponsored #7 Mercedes of Kurt Thiim in the 1991 Deutsche Tourenwagen Meisterschaft.

He moved on to Zakspeed for 1992, racing with Mercedes cars until 1995, and Opel Calibra in the final "old DTM" season, the 1996 International Touring Car Championship for Class 1 Touring Cars. Zakspeed and Moser again had bad luck with a folding racing series, the 1998 FIA GT Championship in which Zakspeed entered Porsche 911 GT1-98 on Pirelli tyres. Returning from the final FIA GT race in Laguna Seca, California, unsuspecting Zakspeed mechanics were handed their dismissal letters as Peter Zakowski tried to return to F1 racing by buying Walkinshaw's shares in Arrows for around $40 million, but terms could not be reached and the deal fell through. Moser quits, and some former employees of Zakspeed and Günther Warthofer’s BMW team join him. For 1999, Moser started his own team by purchasing Audi A4 Super Touring or Class 2 Touring Cars that won the 1998 Australian Super Touring Championship. Phoenix Racing competed in the German Supertouring Championship (STW) in 1999 with Michael Bartels and Arnd Meier driving Audi A4s. Phoenix was one of the first companies to settle in Meuspath, in the new industrial area that was being built alongside the B258 road in close proximity to the Nürburgring. Ernst Moser always makes sure that his team rests on at least two pillars, like Supertouring Cars, DTM, Porsche Carrera Cup, Nürburgring 24 Hours, Spa-Francorchamps 24 Hours, FIA GT Championship, VLN, Speedcar, and so on.

The team moved, along with factories, from folding STW to the revived Deutsche Tourenwagen Masters series in 2000, running Opel Astra V8 Coupes, with Manuel Reuter finishing as runner-up and Bartels finishing seventh. The 24 Hours of Nürburgring had "returned to power" in 1999, and Zakspeed entered a mighty V10-powered FIA-GT2-spec Oreca-built Chrysler Viper GTS-R that dominated from 1999 onwards, scoring three wins despite additional weight and power restriction. Only Phoenix could beat them, twice. The first win came in 2000 in a factory-backed Porsche 996 GT3-R with Bartels, Uwe Alzen, Altfrid Heger and Bernd Mayländer as drivers. For 2003, three factories entered V8 powered cars, BMW a GTR from IMSA GT, Audi and Opel modified DTM cars while Mercedes stayed away, and Manthey and Alzen entered turbocharged Porsche based on GT2 and GT3. Phoenix scored the second victory in an DTM Opel Astra V8 with Reuter, Timo Scheider, Volker Strycek and Marcel Tiemann. Opel began to struggle in the DTM in 2001, with Reuter the best Opel in ninth position and Phoenix teammate Yves Oliver finishing down in 22nd place.

Günther Steiner had led Opel Performance Center (OPC) in 2004, but then returned to F1. At the beginning of 2005 Deutsche Tourenwagen Masters, Opel announced to leave after the season due to budget reasons. For the last hurrah of the Opel Vectra GTS V8 DTM, Opel appointed 43 year old Kfz-Meister (Master car mechanic) Moser as Technikchef, sharing duties: three days per week at the Opel DTM-Center in Bobingen in the facilities of Team Holzer that entered two cars as OPC-Süd Holzer, and two days at his own team and its two cars entered as OPC-Nord Phoenix.

For 2006, there was a need for more cars to be run, supplied by the remaining two manufacturers, Mercedes-Benz and Audi. This led to Phoenix running one-year-old Audi A4s from the 2006 season onwards. In 2011 Martin Tomczyk won the DTM drivers title for Phoenix at the penultimate race in Valencia, with 3 victories, 7 total podiums, and 1 pole position. In 2013, Mike Rockenfeller took the title in the 2013 Deutsche Tourenwagen Masters season with one race remaining having 2 wins and 3 second places, driving the Audi A5.

Phoenix Racing also began competing in the FIA GT Championship in 2006, with Jean-Denis Délétraz and Andrea Piccini finishing the season as runners-up in an Aston Martin DBR9. For 2007 the team joined up with Toine Hezemans' Carsport Holland team to form Phoenix Carsport. Deletraz and Mike Hezemans finished in third place in the standings racing a Corvette C6.R. In 2008, Hezemans and Fabrizio Gollin finished as runners-up for the team. In 2009, Carsport returned to running their team with Peka Racing, but Phoenix and Carsport will again partner each other in 2010 for the first season of the FIA GT1 World Championship.

Phoenix Racing became an Audi Sport factory-supported team in 2009, competing at the Blancpain Endurance Series and 24 Hours of Nürburgring with an Audi R8 GT3 LMS. In 2012, the team won the Bathurst 12 Hour, the 24 Hours of Nürburgring and the 24 Hours of Spa. They also won the 2014 24 Hours of Nürburgring and the 2016 Sepang 12 Hours.

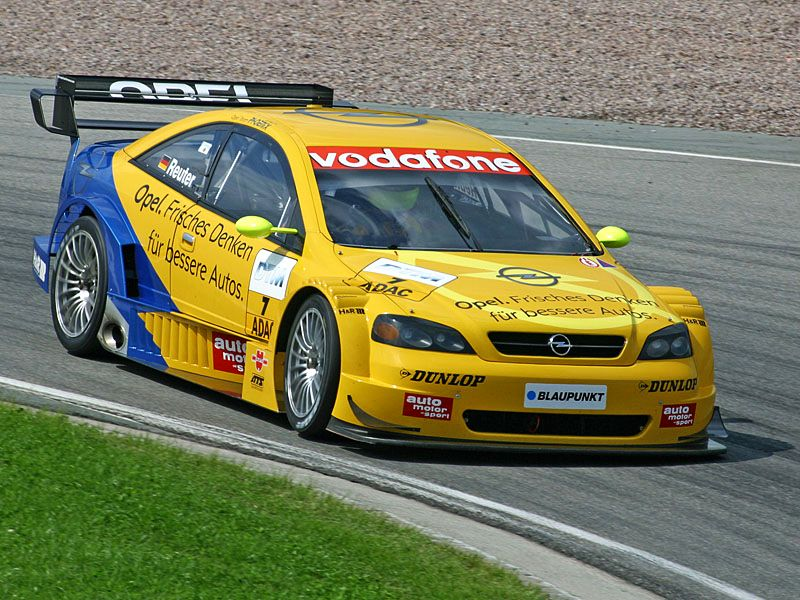
Manuel Reuter 2002

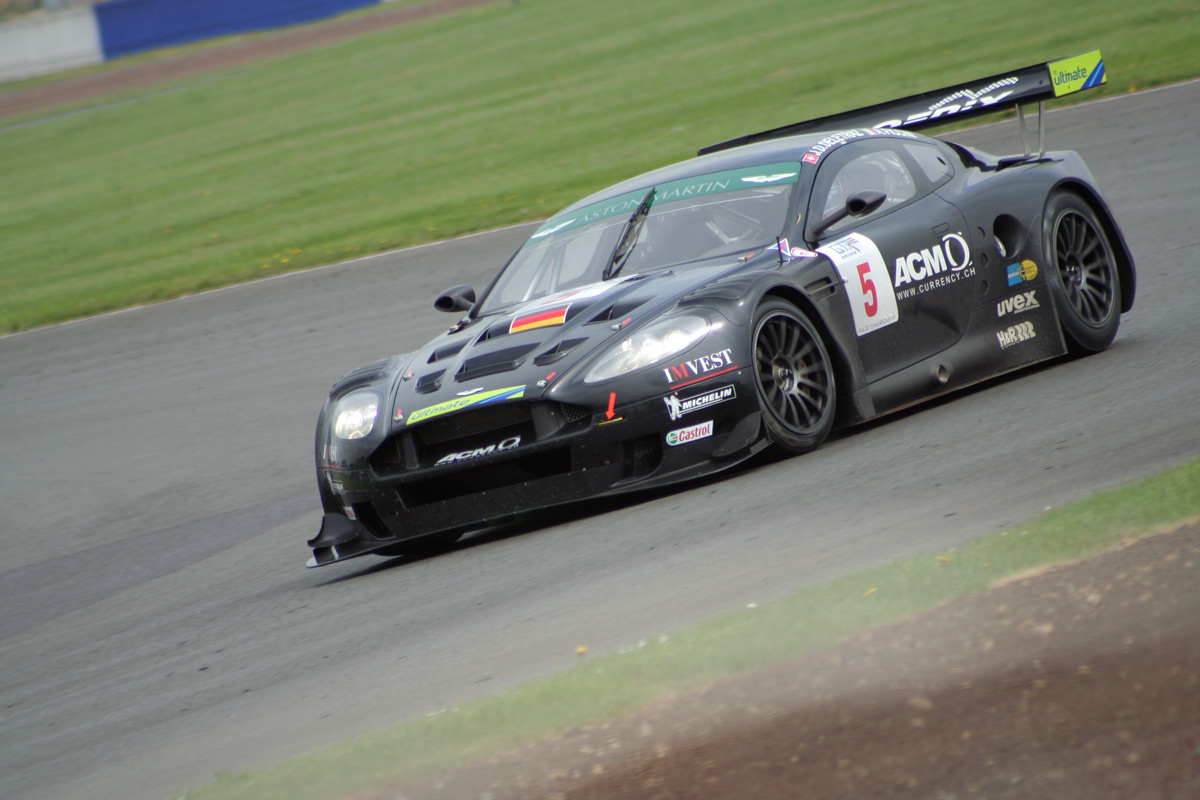
Phoenix Racing Aston Martin DBR9 in 2006

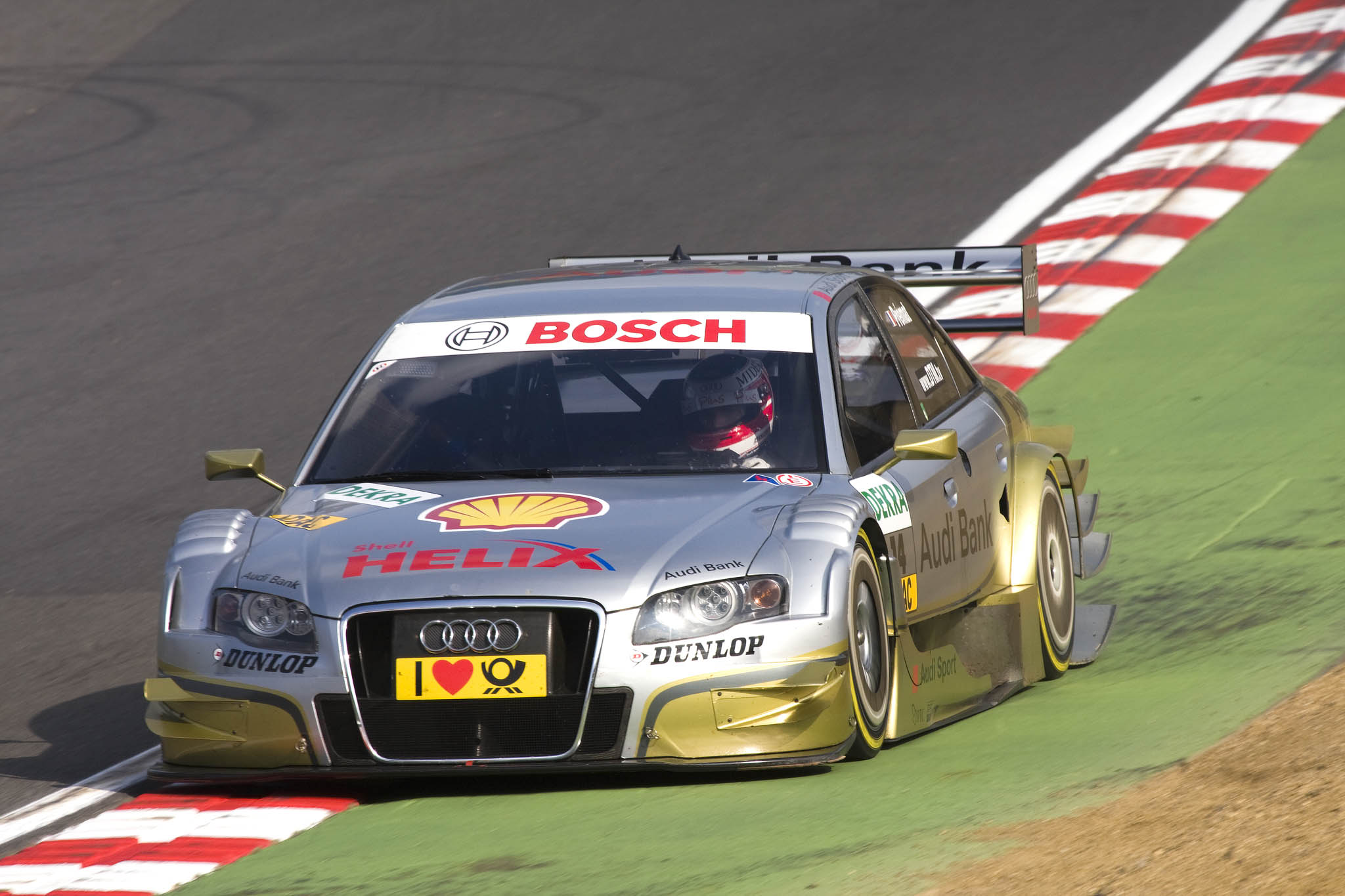
Alexandre Prémat 2008

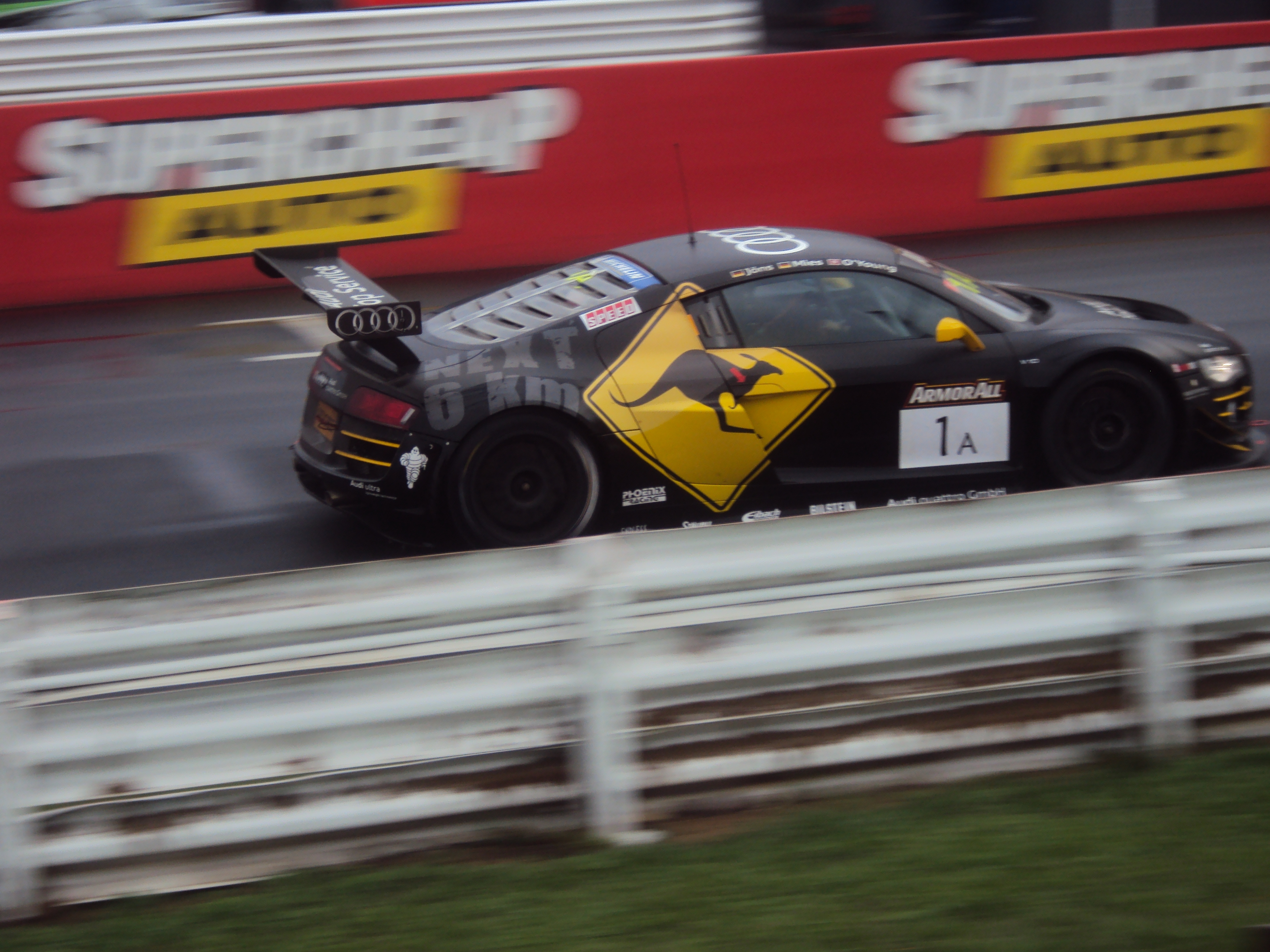
Bathurst 12 Hour winner in 2012

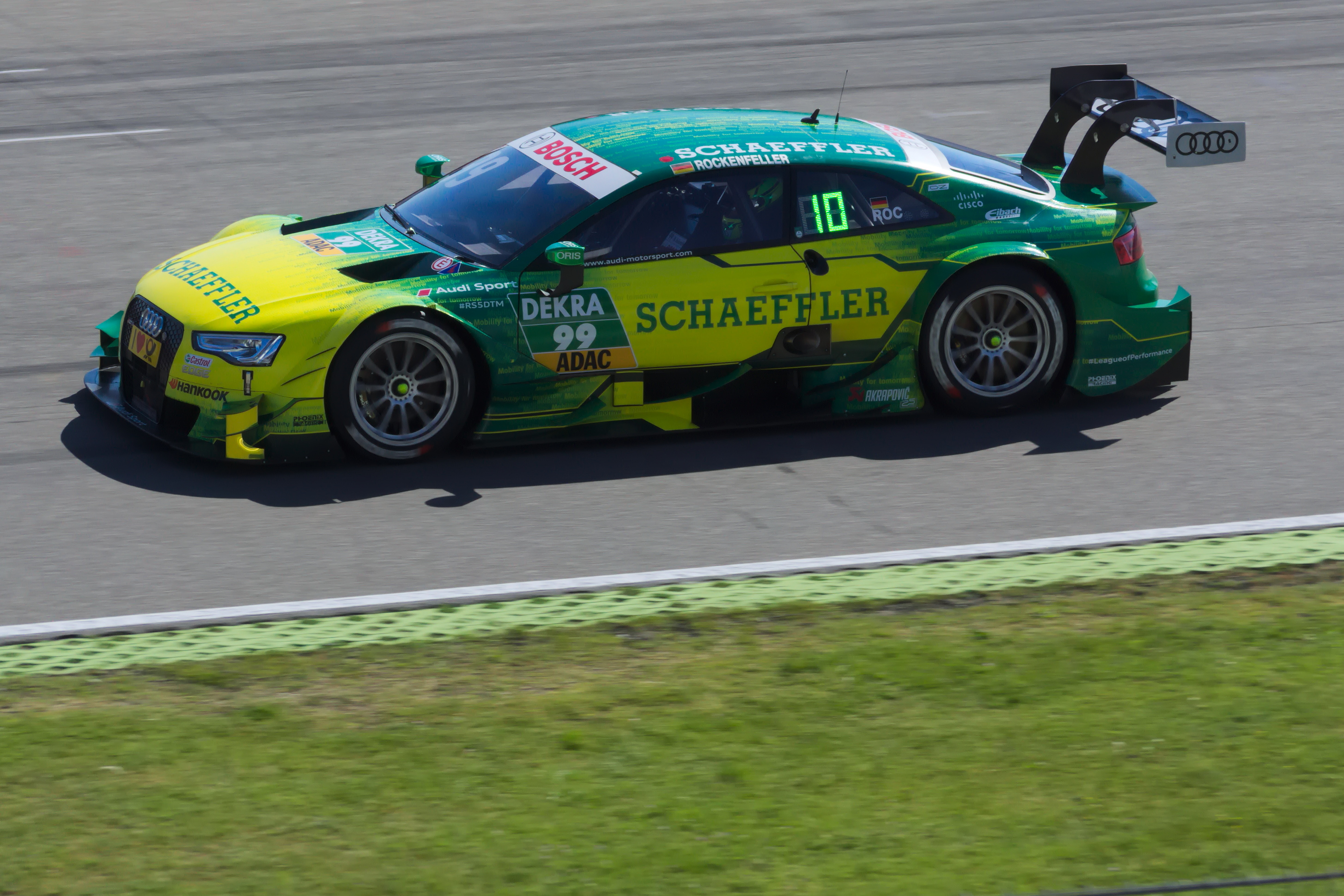
Mike Rockenfeller in 2016
