= FFF Racing Team =

Chinese racing team

(China) FFF Racing Team by ACM
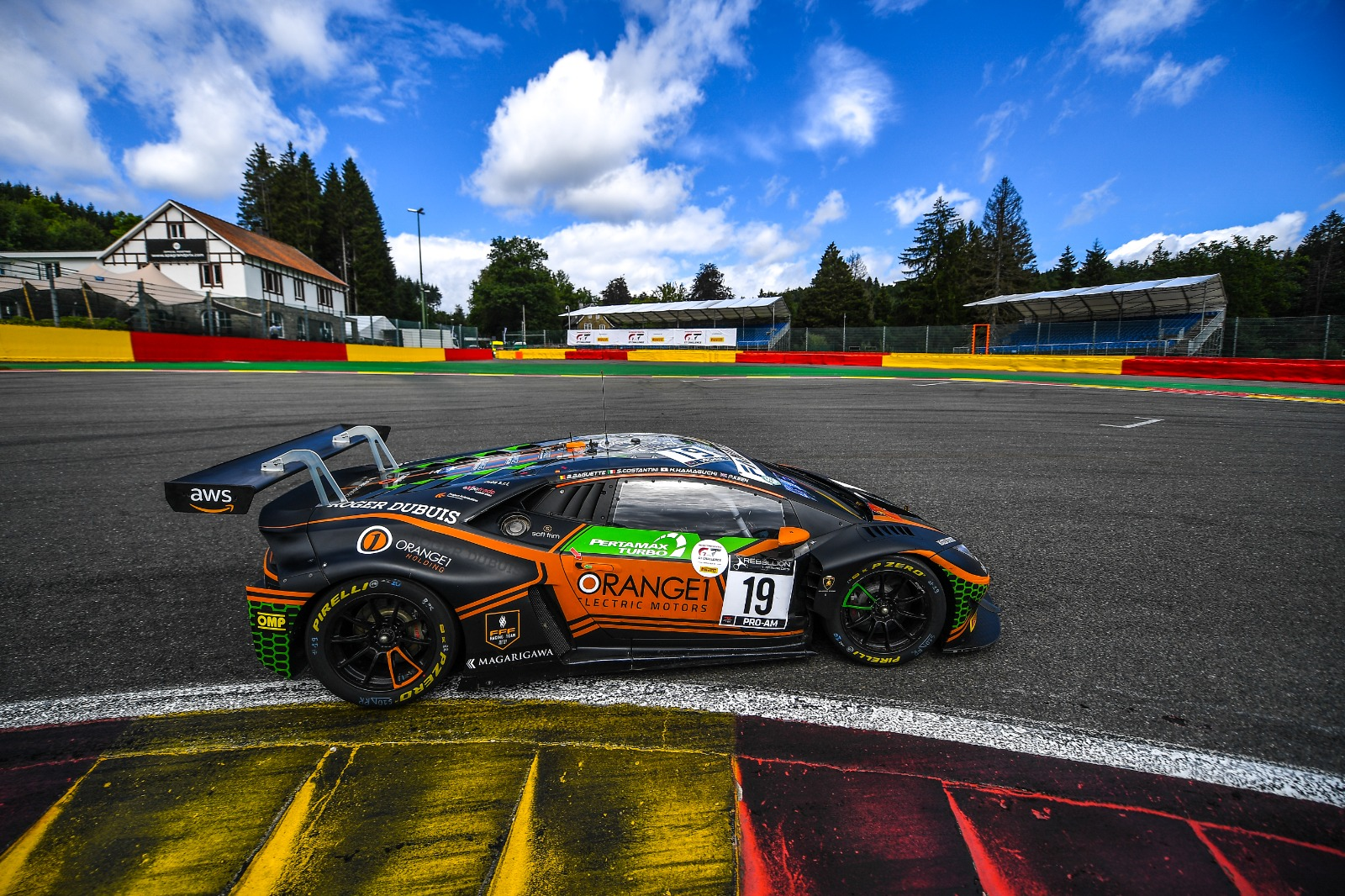
- Founded: 2014
- Folded: 2023
- Base: Sant'Agata Bolognese, Italy
- Team principal(s): Fu Songyang; Andrea Caldarelli
- Former series: Lamborghini Super Trofeo; GT World Challenge Europe; GT World Challenge Asia; International GT Open; GT Asia Series; Michelin Le Mans Cup
- Teams' Championships: 2018 Blancpain GT Series Asia – GT3; 2019 Blancpain GT Series – Pro; 2019 Blancpain GT Series Endurance Cup – Pro; 2019 FIA Motorsport Games GT Cup

FFF Racing Team by ACM (known as Rexal FFF Racing Team and previously Orange1 FFF Racing Team for sponsorship reasons) was a Chinese sports car racing team that competed in the Lamborghini Super Trofeo Europe, GT World Challenge Europe, and GT World Challenge Asia, among other series.

The team was crowned GT World Challenge Asia champions in 2018, as well as team champions in the GT World Challenge Europe Endurance Cup and overall championship in 2019.

== History ==
=== Founding ===
Founded in 2014, the team came about as a result of a partnership between Chinese businessman Fu Songyang and Italian racing driver Andrea Caldarelli, branded as FFF Racing Team by ACM. The team began competition the following season, taking delivery of three McLaren 650S GT3 models ahead of the 2015 GT Asia Series season. The team claimed their inaugural victory at Okayama that season, as full-time driver Hiroshi Hamaguchi finished 10th in the driver's championship.

=== Lamborghini transition ===
For the 2016 GT Asia Series season, FFF Racing shifted to competing with the recently introduced Lamborghini Huracán GT3, with Lamborghini's factory junior driver pairing of Edoardo Liberati and Andrea Amici joining the team's effort. The team would take two overall victories and seven podiums that season, with Liberati and Amici claiming the driver's title. 2016 also marked the team's first foray into European competition, fielding two entries in the GT3 Le Mans Cup and another at the Paul Ricard round of the International GT Open.

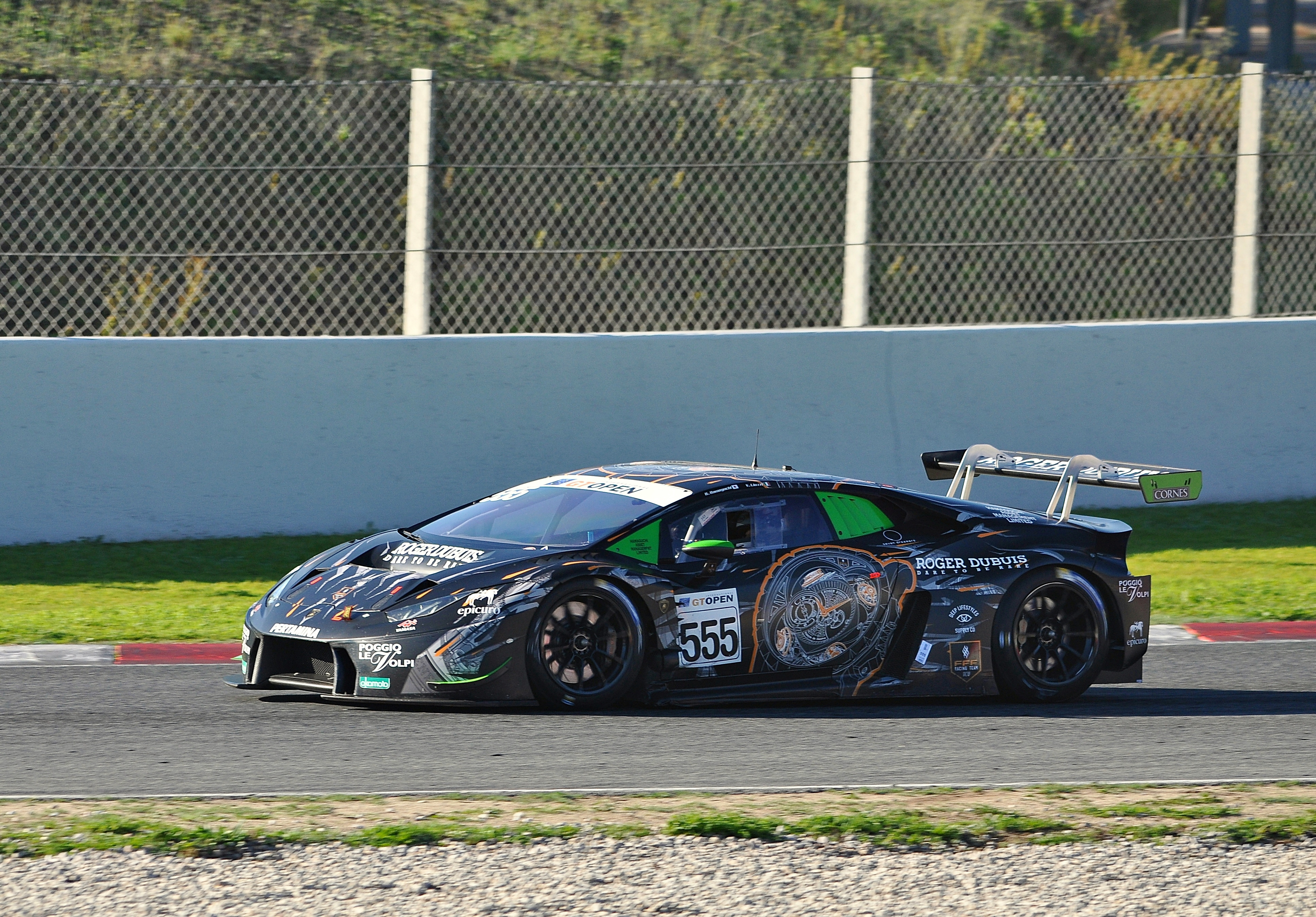
FFF competing in the International GT Open at Barcelona in 2017

The following season, the team entered the inaugural season of the Blancpain GT Series Asia with support from Squadra Corse. The #1 car featured the season-long duo of Alberto di Folco and Aidan Read, while the #2 featured a slew of drivers across the Pro-Am and Am classes. The 2018 season proved successful for the team, claiming the overall team's championship alongside multiple driver's titles. Martin Kodrić and Dennis Lind claimed the overall and Silver Class championships, while Hiroshi Hamaguchi and Marco Mapelli took the Pro-Am Cup championship.

=== Full factory support ===
For 2019, the team launched a renewed three car effort with full factory support for the 2019 Blancpain GT Series. Success followed the team into 2019, as drivers Marco Mapelli and Andrea Caldarelli made series history by becoming the first set of drivers to win the Sprint, Endurance, and Overall championships in the Pro category. Furthermore, the team claimed the Pro class Overall and Endurance team's championship titles, while Hiroshi Hamaguchi and Phil Keen helped the team to the Pro-Am class team's and driver's titles in the Sprint series. In 2021, the team announced their intentions to compete at the Nürburgring 24 Hours for the first time in team history. Following the 2021 season, the team paused their GT3 program, electing to focus on their Lamborghini Super Trofeo efforts. In January 2023, the team announced that it had ended its racing activities. The team was reportedly affected heavily by the COVID-19 pandemic, contributing to the team folding. Caldarelli stated that the decision to close the team came from a multitude of factors, which included a lack of factory-supported opportunities with Lamborghini in the near future.

Japanese team B-Max Engineering entered the 2023 GT World Challenge Asia under the Spirit of FFF Racing moniker, paying homage to the defunct team with which driver Hiroshi Hamaguchi formerly competed.

=== eSports ===
In April 2020, the team announced the creation of their eSports arm, dubbed FFF eSports, to compete in the 2020 SRO E-sport GT Series. For their inaugural season, the team competed in the Silver Class designed for sim racers, signing drivers Jaroslav Honzik and Kamil Franczak.

Achievements
Preceded by GruppeM Racing Team	Blancpain GT Series Asia Team's Champion; 2018	Succeeded by Absolute Racing; Panther / AAS Motorsport
Preceded by AKKA ASP; SunEnergy1 Racing	Blancpain GT Series Team's Champion; 2019	Succeeded by Team WRT
Preceded by Mercedes-AMG Team Black Falcon	Blancpain GT Series Endurance Cup Team's Champion; 2019	Succeeded by AF Corse; SMP Racing
