= 2019 Blancpain GT Series =

2019 sports car racing series

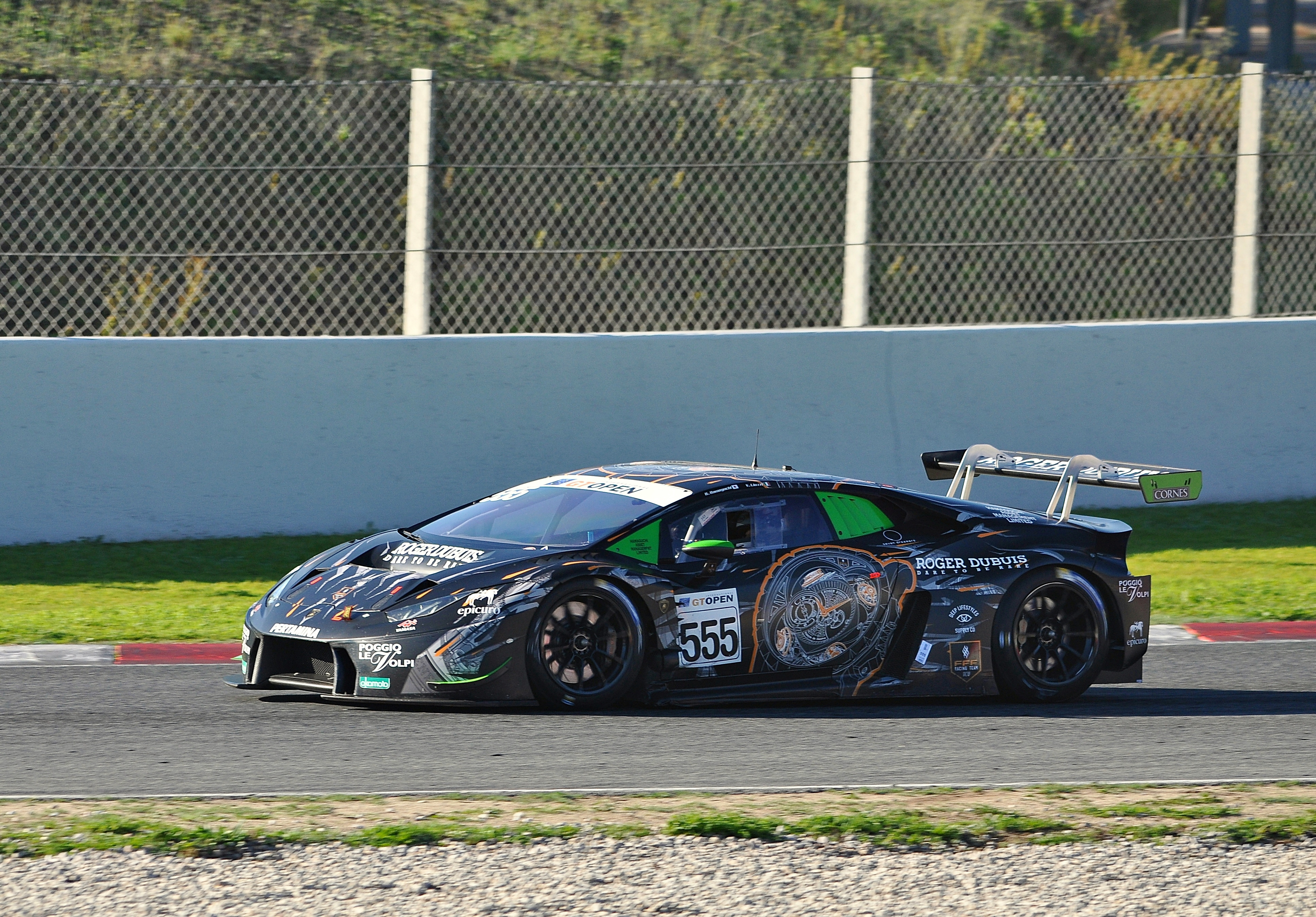
FFF Racing won the overall Blancpain GT Series Championship for Lamborghini, with drivers Andrea Caldarelli and Marco Mapelli securing Lamborghini's second overall championship in the series in three seasons.

The 2019 Blancpain GT Series was the last season under the title of the Blancpain GT Series. The season began on 14 April at Monza and ended on 29 September in Barcelona. The season features ten rounds, five Endurance Cup rounds and five World Challenge Europe rounds. The overall championship was won by Chinese Lamborghini factory team FFF Racing and their drivers, Andrea Caldarelli and Marco Mapelli.

== Calendar ==
At the annual press conference during the 2018 24 Hours of Spa on 27 July, the Stéphane Ratel Organisation announced the first draft of the 2019 calendar. The Endurance Cup round in Barcelona would become a World Challenge Europe round, replacing the round at the Nürburgring. Zolder was initially dropped from the schedule in favor of the Red Bull Ring, before the Austrian Grand Prix venue was replaced by Zandvoort in the final draft of the calendar released on 22 October. Barcelona and the Nürburgring were once again swapped around, making the latter circuit the host of a World Challenge Europe round.

Round	Circuit	Date	Series	Report
1	Autodromo Nazionale Monza, Monza, Italy	14 April	Endurance	Report
2	(United Kingdom) Brands Hatch, Kent, Great Britain	4–5 May	World Challenge	Report
3	(United Kingdom) Silverstone Circuit, Silverstone, Great Britain	12 May	Endurance	Report
4	Circuit Paul Ricard, Le Castellet, France	1 June	Endurance	Report
5	Misano World Circuit Marco Simoncelli, Misano Adriatico, Italy	29–30 June	World Challenge	Report
6	Circuit Zandvoort, Zandvoort, Netherlands	13–14 July	World Challenge	Report
7	Circuit de Spa-Francorchamps, Stavelot, Belgium	27–28 July	Endurance	Report
8	Nürburgring, Nürburg, Germany	31 August – 1 September	World Challenge	Report
9	Hungaroring, Mogyoród, Hungary	7–8 September	World Challenge	Report
10	Circuit de Barcelona-Catalunya, Montmeló, Spain	29 September	Endurance	Report

== Race results ==
Bold indicates overall winner.

Round		Circuit	Pole position	Pro Winners	Silver Winners	Pro-Am Winners	Am Winners
1		(Italy) Monza	(Austria) No. 63 GRT Grasser Racing Team	(Italy) **No. 54 Dinamic Motorsport**	(France) No. 90 AKKA ASP Team	(United Kingdom) No. 93 Tempesta Racing	(United Kingdom) No. 77 Barwell Motorsport
1		(Italy) Monza	(Italy) Mirko Bortolotti (Germany) Christian Engelhart (Switzerland) Rolf Ineichen	(Kuwait) **Zaid Ashkanani** (Austria) **Klaus Bachler** (Italy) **Andrea Rizzoli**	(Germany) Nico Bastian (Russia) Timur Boguslavskiy (Brazil) Felipe Fraga	(United Kingdom) Chris Buncombe (United Kingdom) Chris Froggatt (Hong Kong) Jonathan Hui	(Switzerland) Adrian Amstutz (Russia) Leo Machitski (Portugal) Miguel Ramos
2	R1	(United Kingdom) Brands Hatch	(Germany) No. 4 Black Falcon	(Germany) No. 4 Black Falcon	(France) **No. 89 AKKA ASP Team**	(Germany) No. 333 Rinaldi Racing	(Austria) No. 444 HB Racing
2	R1	(United Kingdom) Brands Hatch	(Germany) Maro Engel (Germany) Luca Stolz	(Germany) Maro Engel (Germany) Luca Stolz	(Germany) **Nico Bastian** (France) **Thomas Neubauer**	(South Africa) David Perel (Russia) Rinat Salikhov	(Germany) Florian Scholze (Germany) Wolfgang Triller
2	R2	(United Kingdom) Brands Hatch	(France) No. 90 AKKA ASP Team	(Germany) **No. 4 Black Falcon**	(France) No. 89 AKKA ASP Team	(China) No. 519 Orange1 FFF Racing Team	(Austria) No. 444 HB Racing
2	R2	(United Kingdom) Brands Hatch	(Russia) Timur Boguslavskiy (Germany) Fabian Schiller	(Germany) **Maro Engel** (Germany) **Luca Stolz**	(Germany) Nico Bastian (France) Thomas Neubauer	(Japan) Hiroshi Hamaguchi (United Kingdom) Phil Keen	(Germany) Florian Scholze (Germany) Wolfgang Triller
3		(United Kingdom) Silverstone	(Austria) No. 63 GRT Grasser Racing Team	**(Russia) No. 72 SMP Racing**	(Austria) No. 19 GRT Grasser Racing Team	(Italy) No. 52 AF Corse	(United Kingdom) No. 77 Barwell Motorsport
3		(United Kingdom) Silverstone	(Italy) Mirko Bortolotti (Germany) Christian Engelhart (Switzerland) Rolf Ineichen	**(Russia) Mikhail Aleshin** **(Spain) Miguel Molina** **(Italy) Davide Rigon**	(Switzerland) Lucas Mauron (France) Arno Santamato (Austria) Gerhard Tweraser	(Italy) Andrea Bertolini (Netherlands) Niek Hommerson (Belgium) Louis Machiels	(Switzerland) Adrian Amstutz (Russia) Leo Machitski (Portugal) Miguel Ramos
4		(France) Paul Ricard	(United Kingdom) No. 107 Bentley Team M-Sport	**(United Kingdom) No. 107 Bentley Team M-Sport**	(France) No. 90 AKKA ASP Team	(France) No. 87 AKKA ASP Team	(United Kingdom) No. 188 Garage 59
4		(France) Paul Ricard	(France) Jules Gounon (United Kingdom) Steven Kane (South Africa) Jordan Pepper	**(France) Jules Gounon** **(United Kingdom) Steven Kane** **(South Africa) Jordan Pepper**	(Germany) Nico Bastian (Russia) Timur Boguslavskiy (Brazil) Felipe Fraga	(France) Jean-Luc Beaubelique (France) Jim Pla (Belgium) Mauro Ricci	(United Kingdom) Chris Goodwin (United Kingdom) Chris Harris (United Kingdom) Alexander West
5	R1	(Italy) Misano	(Belgium) No. 2 Belgian Audi Club Team WRT	**(China) No. 563 Orange1 FFF Racing Team**	(France) No. 90 AKKA ASP Team	(Italy) No. 52 AF Corse	(Austria) No. 444 HB Racing
5	R1	(Italy) Misano	(Belgium) Dries Vanthoor (Belgium) Charles Weerts	**(Italy) Andrea Caldarelli** **(Italy) Marco Mapelli**	(Russia) Timur Boguslavskiy (Germany) Fabian Schiller	(Italy) Andrea Bertolini (Belgium) Louis Machiels	(Germany) Florian Scholze (Germany) Wolfgang Triller
5	R2	(Italy) Misano	(France) No. 88 AKKA ASP Team	**(Belgium) No. 2 Belgian Audi Club Team WRT**	(France) No. 89 AKKA ASP Team	(China) No. 519 Orange1 FFF Racing Team	(Austria) No. 444 HB Racing
5	R2	(Italy) Misano	(Monaco) Vincent Abril (Italy) Raffaele Marciello	**(Belgium) Dries Vanthoor** **(Belgium) Charles Weerts**	(Germany) Nico Bastian (France) Thomas Neubauer	(Japan) Hiroshi Hamaguchi (United Kingdom) Phil Keen	(Germany) Florian Scholze (Germany) Wolfgang Triller
6	R1	(Netherlands) Zandvoort	(France) No. 88 AKKA ASP Team	**(France) No. 88 AKKA ASP Team**	(Switzerland) No. 62 R-Motorsport	(China) No. 519 Orange1 FFF Racing Team	(Austria) No. 444 HB Racing
6	R1	(Netherlands) Zandvoort	(Monaco) Vincent Abril (Italy) Raffaele Marciello	**(Monaco) Vincent Abril** **(Italy) Raffaele Marciello**	(Switzerland) Hugo de Sadeleer (Finland) Aaro Vainio	(Japan) Hiroshi Hamaguchi (United Kingdom) Phil Keen	(Germany) Florian Scholze (Germany) Wolfgang Triller
6	R2	(Netherlands) Zandvoort	(France) No. 25 Saintéloc Racing	**(France) No. 25 Saintéloc Racing**	(Switzerland) No. 62 R-Motorsport	(Germany) No. 333 Rinaldi Racing	(Austria) No. 444 HB Racing
6	R2	(Netherlands) Zandvoort	(France) Simon Gachet (Germany) Christopher Haase	**(France) Simon Gachet** **(Germany) Christopher Haase**	(Switzerland) Hugo de Sadeleer (Finland) Aaro Vainio	(South Africa) David Perel (Russia) Rinat Salikhov	(Germany) Florian Scholze (Germany) Wolfgang Triller
7		(Belgium) Spa-Francorchamps	(Germany) No. 4 Mercedes-AMG Team Black Falcon	**(United Arab Emirates) No. 20 GPX Racing**	(United Kingdom) No. 78 Barwell Motorsport	No. 97 Oman Racing with TF Sport	(Germany) No. 33 Rinaldi Racing
7		(Belgium) Spa-Francorchamps	(Netherlands) Yelmer Buurman (Germany) Maro Engel (Germany) Luca Stolz	**(Denmark) Michael Christensen** **(France) Kévin Estre** **(Austria) Richard Lietz**	(United Kingdom) Sandy Mitchell (United Kingdom) James Pull (United Kingdom) Jordan Witt	(Oman) Ahmad Al Harthy (Republic of Ireland) Charlie Eastwood (Denmark) Nicki Thiim (Turkey) Salih Yoluç	(Germany) Christian Hook (Germany) Manuel Lauck (Germany) Alexander Mattschull (Germany) Hendrik Still
8	R1	(Germany) Nürburgring	(Austria) No. 63 GRT Grasser Racing Team	**(China) No. 563 Orange1 FFF Racing Team**	(Germany) No. 56 Attempto Racing	(Germany) No. 333 Rinaldi Racing	(Switzerland) No. 111 Kessel Racing
8	R1	(Germany) Nürburgring	(Italy) Mirko Bortolotti (Germany) Christian Engelhart	**(Italy) Andrea Caldarelli** **(Italy) Marco Mapelli**	(Netherlands) Milan Dontje (Italy) Mattia Drudi	(South Africa) David Perel (Russia) Rinat Salikhov	(United States) Stephen Earle (Finland) Rory Penttinen
8	R2	(Germany) Nürburgring	(Belgium) No. 1 Belgian Audi Club Team WRT	**(Switzerland) No. 76 R-Motorsport**	(Belgium) No. 10 Belgian Audi Club Team WRT	(Italy) No. 52 AF Corse	(Austria) No. 444 HB Racing
8	R2	(Germany) Nürburgring	(Argentina) Ezequiel Pérez Companc (Belgium) Dries Vanthoor	**(United Kingdom) Ricky Collard** **(Germany) Marvin Kirchhöfer**	(Netherlands) Rik Breukers (Colombia) Óscar Tunjo	(Italy) Andrea Bertolini (Belgium) Louis Machiels	(Germany) Florian Scholze (Germany) Wolfgang Triller
9	R1	(Hungary) Hungaroring	(France) No. 88 AKKA ASP Team	**(France) No. 88 AKKA ASP Team**	(France) No. 89 AKKA ASP Team	(France) No. 87 AKKA ASP Team	(Austria) No. 444 HB Racing
9	R1	(Hungary) Hungaroring	(Monaco) Vincent Abril (Italy) Raffaele Marciello	**(Monaco) Vincent Abril** **(Italy) Raffaele Marciello**	(Germany) Nico Bastian (France) Thomas Neubauer	(France) Jean-Luc Beaubelique (France) Jim Pla	(Germany) Florian Scholze (Germany) Wolfgang Triller
9	R2	(Hungary) Hungaroring	(France) No. 88 AKKA ASP Team	**(France) No. 88 AKKA ASP Team**	(France) No. 90 AKKA ASP Team	(China) No. 519 Orange1 FFF Racing Team	(Austria) No. 444 HB Racing
9	R2	(Hungary) Hungaroring	(Monaco) Vincent Abril (Italy) Raffaele Marciello	**(Monaco) Vincent Abril** **(Italy) Raffaele Marciello**	(Russia) Timur Boguslavskiy (Brazil) Felipe Fraga	(Japan) Hiroshi Hamaguchi (United Kingdom) Phil Keen	(Germany) Florian Scholze (Germany) Wolfgang Triller
10		(Spain) Barcelona-Catalunya	(Germany) No. 98 Rowe Racing	**(China) No. 563 Orange1 FFF Racing Team**	(France) No. 90 AKKA ASP Team	(France) No. 26 Saintéloc Racing	(Italy) No. 29 Raton Racing by Target
10		(Spain) Barcelona-Catalunya	(France) Romain Dumas (France) Mathieu Jaminet (Germany) Sven Müller	**(Italy) Andrea Caldarelli** **(Spain) Albert Costa** **(Italy) Marco Mapelli**	(Germany) Nico Bastian (Russia) Timur Boguslavskiy (Brazil) Felipe Fraga	(France) Edouard Cauhaupé (France) Pierre-Alexandre Jean (France) Pierre-Yves Paque	(Italy) Stefano Costantini (Spain) Toni Forné (Switzerland) Christoph Lenz

== Championship standings ==
Scoring system

Championship points are awarded for the first ten positions in each race. The pole-sitter also receives one point and entries are required to complete 75% of the winning car's race distance in order to be classified and earn points. Individual drivers are required to participate for a minimum of 25 minutes in order to earn championship points in any race.

World Challenge Europe Race points

Position	**1st**	**2nd**	**3rd**	**4th**	**5th**	**6th**	**7th**	**8th**	**9th**	**10th**	**Pole**
Points	16.5	12	9.5	7.5	6	4.5	3	2	1	0.5	1

Endurance Cup Race points

Position	**1st**	**2nd**	**3rd**	**4th**	**5th**	**6th**	**7th**	**8th**	**9th**	**10th**	**Pole**
Points	25	18	15	12	10	8	6	4	2	1	1

1000 km Paul Ricard points

Position	**1st**	**2nd**	**3rd**	**4th**	**5th**	**6th**	**7th**	**8th**	**9th**	**10th**	**Pole**
Points	33	24	19	15	12	9	6	4	2	1	1

24 Hours of Spa points

Points were awarded after six hours, after twelve hours and at the finish.

Position	**1st**	**2nd**	**3rd**	**4th**	**5th**	**6th**	**7th**	**8th**	**9th**	**10th**	**Pole**
Points after 6hrs/12hrs	12	9	7	6	5	4	3	2	1	0	1
Points at the finish	25	18	15	12	10	8	6	4	2	1	1

=== Drivers' championships ===
==== Overall ====
Pos.	Driver	Team	MNZ (Italy)	BRH (United Kingdom)		SIL (United Kingdom)	LEC (France)	MIS (Italy)		ZAN (Netherlands)		SPA (Belgium)			NÜR (Germany)		HUN (Hungary)		CAT (Spain)	Points
Pos.	Driver	Team	MNZ (Italy)	BRH (United Kingdom)		SIL (United Kingdom)	LEC (France)	MIS (Italy)		ZAN (Netherlands)		6hrs	12hrs	24hrs	NÜR (Germany)		HUN (Hungary)		CAT (Spain)	Points
1	(Italy) Andrea Caldarelli (Italy) Marco Mapelli	(China) Orange1 FFF Racing Team	2	Ret	2	6	3	1	2	3	7	33	21	8	1	3	5	4	1	166.5
2	(Germany) Maro Engel (Germany) Luca Stolz	(Germany) Black Falcon	3	**2**	1	7	15	3	4	4	4				8	4	2	3	12	143.5
2	(Germany) Maro Engel (Germany) Luca Stolz	(Germany) Mercedes-AMG Team Black Falcon										**3**	**3**	**3**						143.5
3	(Italy) Mirko Bortolotti (Germany) Christian Engelhart	(Austria) GRT Grasser Racing Team	**40**	3	10	**36**	7	6	16	2	2	2	6	16	**2**	8	3	2		96
4	(Monaco) Vincent Abril (Italy) Raffaele Marciello	(France) Mercedes-AMG Team AKKA ASP	39			Ret	Ret					4	7	13					38	87.5
4	(Monaco) Vincent Abril (Italy) Raffaele Marciello	(France) AKKA ASP Team		4	19			2	**15**	**1**	6				9	Ret	**1**	**1**		87.5
5	(Germany) Marvin Kirchhöfer	(Switzerland) R-Motorsport	19	7	5	DNS	4	4	13	7	18	5	25	19	7	1	10	19	2	77.5
6	(Germany) Christopher Haase	(France) Saintéloc Racing	15	16	7	11	9	Ret	3	10	**1**				3	2	6	6	Ret	75
6	(Germany) Christopher Haase	(France) Audi Sport Team Saintéloc										12	10	4						75
7	(Russia) Mikhail Aleshin (Spain) Miguel Molina (Italy) Davide Rigon	(Russia) SMP Racing	23			1	2					1	1	51					13	73
8	(France) Simon Gachet	(France) Saintéloc Racing	15	16	7	11	9	Ret	3	10	**1**	62	56	48	3	2	6	6	Ret	63
9	(Belgium) Dries Vanthoor	(Belgium) Belgian Audi Club Team WRT	18	11	Ret	3	Ret	**Ret**	1	5	3				5	**27**	17	16	25	55
9	(Belgium) Dries Vanthoor	(Belgium) Audi Sport Team WRT										17	24	25						55
10	(Germany) Nico Bastian	(France) AKKA ASP Team	4	1	8	10	11	20	6	9	12	14	14	17	24	18	7	8	5	52
11	(Netherlands) Yelmer Buurman	(Germany) Black Falcon	3			7	15												12	51
11	(Netherlands) Yelmer Buurman	(Germany) Mercedes-AMG Team Black Falcon										**3**	**3**	**3**						51
12	(France) Jules Gounon (United Kingdom) Steven Kane (South Africa) Jordan Pepper	(United Kingdom) Bentley Team M-Sport	12			12	**1**					16	28	49					3	49
13	(Denmark) Dennis Lind	(China) Orange1 FFF Racing Team	2			6	3					33	21	8						49
14	(Belgium) Charles Weerts	(Belgium) Belgian Audi Club Team WRT	27	12	6	Ret	13	**Ret**	1	13	5	30	22	12	4	26	8	7	Ret	40.5
15	(United Kingdom) Ricky Collard	(Switzerland) R-Motorsport		7	5			4	13	7	18	68	68	Ret	7	1	10	19		39.5
16	(United Kingdom) Jake Dennis	(Switzerland) R-Motorsport	19			40	4					5	25	19					2	38
16	(United Kingdom) Alex Lynn	(Switzerland) R-Motorsport					4					5	25	19					2	38
17	(Argentina) Ezequiel Pérez Companc	(Belgium) Belgian Audi Club Team WRT	18	11	Ret	3	Ret			5	3				5	**27**	17	16	25	37.5
18	(Russia) Timur Boguslavskiy	(France) AKKA ASP Team	4	15	**18**	10	11	5	26	26	DNS	14	14	17	10	10	13	5	5	37
19	(Austria) Clemens Schmid	(Germany) Attempto Racing	7	5	4	Ret	8	7	14	27	24	31	30	30	28	12	4	10	10	35.5
20	(South Africa) Kelvin van der Linde	(Germany) Attempto Racing	7	5	4	Ret	8	7	14	27	24	31	30	30	28	12	4	10		34.5
21	(Germany) Sven Müller	(Germany) Rowe Racing	21			4	Ret					36	9	5					**6**	32
21	(Germany) Sven Müller	(Italy) Dinamic Motorsport															28	27		32
21	(France) Romain Dumas (France) Mathieu Jaminet	(Germany) Rowe Racing	21			4	Ret					36	9	5					**6**	32
22	(Kuwait) Zaid Ashkanani (Italy) Andrea Rizzoli	(Italy) Dinamic Motorsport	1			18	37					18	4	27					Ret	31
22	(Austria) Klaus Bachler	(Italy) Dinamic Motorsport	1			18	37					18	4	27						31
23	(United Kingdom) Phil Keen	(China) Orange1 FFF Racing Team	17	14	14	2	20	15	17	18	20	19	16	21	21	20	22	21	4	30
23	(Italy) Giovanni Venturini	(China) Orange1 FFF Racing Team	17			2	20					19	16	21					4	18
24	(France) Thomas Neubauer	(France) AKKA ASP Team		1	8			20	6	9	12				24	18	7	8		29
24	(France) Thomas Neubauer	(Austria) HB Racing										43	43	38						29
25	(Brazil) Felipe Fraga	(France) AKKA ASP Team	4			10	11			26	DNS	14	14	17			13	5	5	29
26	(Denmark) Michael Christensen (France) Kévin Estre (Austria) Richard Lietz	(United Arab Emirates) GPX Racing										11	18	1						25
26	(Spain) Albert Costa	(China) Orange1 FFF Racing Team																	1	25
27	(Australia) Nick Foster	(Germany) Attempto Racing	7	Ret	3	Ret	8	8	8	12	13				14	13	11	13	10	24.5
27	(Australia) Nick Foster	(Taiwan) HubAuto Corsa										69	69	Ret						24.5
28	(Germany) Christopher Mies	(Belgium) Belgian Audi Club Team WRT		12	6					13	5				4	26	8	7		23
28	(Germany) Christopher Mies	(Germany) Montaplast by Land Motorsport										24	15	14						23
29	(Belgium) Frédéric Vervisch	(Germany) Phoenix Racing		8	12			10	5	8	10				13	25	18	20		23
29	(Belgium) Frédéric Vervisch	(France) Audi Sport Team Saintéloc										12	10	4						23
30	(Australia) Matt Campbell (Norway) Dennis Olsen (Germany) Dirk Werner	(Germany) Rowe Racing	8			19	5					10	17	7					Ret	22
31	(Switzerland) Rolf Ineichen	(Austria) GRT Grasser Racing Team	**40**			**36**	7			19	17	2	6	16						21
32	(France) Frédéric Makowiecki (France) Patrick Pilet (United Kingdom) Nick Tandy	(Germany) Rowe Racing										23	11	2						18
32	(France) Franck Perera	(China) Orange1 FFF Racing Team	17			2	20					19	16	21						18
33	(Germany) Fabian Schiller	(France) AKKA ASP Team		15	**18**			5	26						10	10				16
33	(Germany) Fabian Schiller	(France) Mercedes-AMG Team AKKA ASP										4	7	13						16
34	(Spain) Andy Soucek	(United Kingdom) Bentley Team M-Sport	6			14	6												29	17
34	(Spain) Andy Soucek	(United Kingdom) M-Sport Team Bentley										37	34	29						17
34	(Belgium) Maxime Soulet	(United Kingdom) Bentley Team M-Sport	6			14	6					52	63	Ret					29	17
35	(United Kingdom) Jack Hawksworth	(United Kingdom) Strakka Racing	22			5						45	33	32						16
35	(United Kingdom) Jack Hawksworth	(France) Tech 1 Racing								15	Ret				19	5	26	22		16
36	(Germany) Patrick Assenheimer (Germany) Hubert Haupt	(Germany) Black Falcon	5			20	14					21	40	24					7	16
37	(Netherlands) Steijn Schothorst	(Germany) Attempto Racing	24	Ret	3	9	Ret	8	8	12	13	15	62	Ret	14	13	11	13	15	15.5
38	(Spain) Alex Riberas	(Belgium) Belgian Audi Club Team WRT	18			3	Ret												25	15
38	(Spain) Alex Riberas	(Belgium) Audi Sport Team WRT										17	24	25						15
39	(Germany) Markus Winkelhock	(France) Saintéloc Racing	29	Ret	Ret	Ret	30	Ret	Ret	Ret	DNS				18	7	19	12		15
39	(Germany) Markus Winkelhock	(France) Audi Sport Team Saintéloc										12	10	4						15
40	(Italy) Giacomo Altoè	(China) Orange1 FFF Racing Team										61	52	Ret					4	12
41	(Switzerland) Hugo de Sadeleer (Finland) Aaro Vainio	(Switzerland) R-Motorsport		Ret	11			17	7	6	8	68	68	Ret	15	14	9	9		11.5
42	(United Kingdom) Finlay Hutchison	(Germany) Phoenix Racing	14	8	12	21	12	10	5	8	10	29	48	Ret	13	25	18	20	34	11
43	(Belgium) Bertrand Baguette (Germany) Mario Farnbacher (Netherlands) Renger van der Zande	(Italy) Honda Team Motul										7	19	6						11
44	(Austria) Lucas Auer (Germany) Maximilian Buhk (Germany) Maximilian Götz	(Hong Kong) Mercedes-AMG Team GruppeM Racing										13	2	10						10
45	(Italy) Gabriele Piana	(Germany) Black Falcon	5			20	14					21	40	24						10
45	(United Kingdom) Lewis Williamson	(United Kingdom) Strakka Racing	22			5	Ret													10
45	(United Kingdom) Lewis Williamson	(United Kingdom) Mercedes-AMG Team Strakka Racing										32	12	20						10
45	(United States) Dev Gore	(United Kingdom) Strakka Racing	22			5	Ret													10
46	(Italy) Mattia Drudi	(Germany) Attempto Racing	24	10	9	9	Ret	9	18	16	9	15	62	Ret	6	15	12	15	15	10
47	(United Kingdom) Callum MacLeod	(United Kingdom) Bentley Team M-Sport					6												29	9
47	(United Kingdom) Callum MacLeod	(United Kingdom) M-Sport Team Bentley										72	72	Ret						9
48	(Netherlands) Milan Dontje	(Germany) Attempto Racing		10	9			9	18	16	9	31	30	30	6	15	12	15		8
49	(United Kingdom) Alex Buncombe	(United Kingdom) Bentley Team M-Sport	6			14						52	63	Ret						8
50	(Netherlands) Nick Catsburg (Denmark) Mikkel Jensen (Norway) Christian Krognes	(Germany) Walkenhorst Motorsport										8	5	11						7
51	(Netherlands) Rik Breukers	(Belgium) Belgian Audi Club Team WRT	27	9	Ret	Ret	13	25	9	11	25	30	22	12	11	6	16	14	Ret	6.5
51	(Colombia) Óscar Tunjo	(Belgium) Belgian Audi Club Team WRT		9	Ret			25	9	11	25				11	6	16	14		6.5
52	(France) Aurélien Panis	(France) Tech 1 Racing								15	Ret				19	5	26	22		6
53	(Italy) David Fumanelli	(United Kingdom) Strakka Racing					Ret					45	33	32						6
53	(Italy) David Fumanelli	(Germany) Black Falcon																	7	6
54	(France) Steven Palette	(France) Saintéloc Racing	15	Ret	Ret	11	9	Ret	Ret	Ret	DNS	62	56	48	18	7	19	12		5
55	(Australia) Shae Davies	(Belgium) Belgian Audi Club Team WRT	DNS	6	Ret			14	11	17	11				12	17	20	18	24	4.5
55	(Australia) Shae Davies	(Belgium) Team WRT				24	19					41	42	34						4.5
55	(United Kingdom) Tom Gamble	(Belgium) Belgian Audi Club Team WRT		6	Ret			14	11	17	11				12	17	20	18		4.5
56	(United States) John Edwards (Brazil) Augusto Farfus (Germany) Martin Tomczyk	(Germany) BMW Team Schnitzer										6	13	Ret						4
57	(Switzerland) Lucas Mauron (France) Arno Santamato (Austria) Gerhard Tweraser	(Austria) GRT Grasser Racing Team	11			8	Ret					42	36	33					33	4
57	(South Africa) David Perel (Russia) Rinat Salikhov	(Germany) Rinaldi Racing	25	13	16	13	16	12	22	25	15	57	61	Ret	20	24	25	Ret	8	4
57	(Russia) Denis Bulatov	(Germany) Rinaldi Racing	25			13	16					57	61	Ret					8	4
58	(Netherlands) Robin Frijns (Switzerland) Nico Müller (Germany) René Rast	(Belgium) Audi Sport Team WRT										9	8	23						3
59	(United Kingdom) Jonny Adam (France) Côme Ledogar (United Kingdom) Andrew Watson	(United Kingdom) Garage 59	9			Ret	Ret					71	71	Ret						2
59	(Netherlands) Pieter Schothorst	(Germany) Attempto Racing	24			9	Ret					15	62	Ret						2
59	(New Zealand) Earl Bamber (Germany) Timo Bernhard (Belgium) Laurens Vanthoor	(Germany) KÜS Team75 Bernhard										22	23	9						2
59	(Monaco) Benjamin Goethe (South Africa) Jordan Grogor (United Kingdom) Stuart Hall	(United Arab Emirates) GPX Racing	DNS			28	21												9	2
60	(Mexico) Diego Menchaca (United States) Taylor Proto	(China) Orange1 FFF Racing Team	10	19	DNS	Ret	17	23	10	22	16	61	52	Ret	22	16	24	23	21	1.5
61	(Germany) Kim-Luis Schramm	(Germany) Phoenix Racing	14	Ret	13	21	12	22	12	14	14	29	48	Ret	17	9	14	11	34	1
61	(United Kingdom) Jamie Green	(Germany) Montaplast by Land Motorsport										24	15	14						1
61	(United Kingdom) Jamie Green	(Germany) Phoenix Racing													17	9	14	11		1
62	(Belgium) Maxime Martin (United Kingdom) Matt Parry (France) Matthieu Vaxivière	(Switzerland) R-Motorsport	37			17	10					64	64	Ret						1
62	(Italy) Michele Beretta	(China) Orange1 FFF Racing Team	10			Ret	17			19	17	61	52	Ret						1
62	(France) Valentin Hasse-Clot	(Germany) Attempto Racing																	10	1
Pos.	Driver	Team	MNZ (Italy)	BRH (United Kingdom)		SIL (United Kingdom)	LEC (France)	MIS (Italy)		ZAN (Netherlands)		6hrs	12hrs	24hrs	NÜR (Germany)		HUN (Hungary)		CAT (Spain)	Points
Pos.	Driver	Team	MNZ (Italy)	BRH (United Kingdom)		SIL (United Kingdom)	LEC (France)	MIS (Italy)		ZAN (Netherlands)		SPA (Belgium)			NÜR (Germany)		HUN (Hungary)		CAT (Spain)	Points

Key
Colour	Result
Gold	Race winner
Silver	2nd place
Bronze	3rd place
Green	Points finish
Blue	Non-points finish
Blue	Non-classified finish (NC)
Purple	Did not finish (Ret)
Black	Disqualified (DSQ)
Black	Excluded (EX)
White	Did not start (DNS)
White	Race cancelled (C)
White	Withdrew (WD)
Blank	Did not participate

**Bold** – Pole
Italics – Fastest Lap

==== Silver Cup ====
Pos.	Driver	Team	MNZ (Italy)	BRH (United Kingdom)		SIL (United Kingdom)	LEC (France)	MIS (Italy)		ZAN (Netherlands)		SPA (Belgium)			NÜR (Germany)		HUN (Hungary)		CAT (Spain)	Points
Pos.	Driver	Team	MNZ (Italy)	BRH (United Kingdom)		SIL (United Kingdom)	LEC (France)	MIS (Italy)		ZAN (Netherlands)		6hrs	12hrs	24hrs	NÜR (Germany)		HUN (Hungary)		CAT (Spain)	Points
1	(Germany) Nico Bastian	(France) AKKA ASP Team	**4**	**1**	8	10	11	**20**	6	9	12	14	14	17	24	18	**7**	2	**5**	254.5
2	(Russia) Timur Boguslavskiy	(France) AKKA ASP Team	**4**	15	**18**	10	11	5	**26**	**26**	DNS	14	14	17	10	10	13	**5**	**5**	229
3	(Brazil) Felipe Fraga	(France) AKKA ASP Team	**4**			10	11			**26**	DNS	14	14	17			13	**5**	**5**	170
4	(Italy) Mattia Drudi	(Germany) Attempto Racing	24	10	9	**9**	**Ret**	9	18	16	**9**	**15**	**62**	**Ret**	**6**	15	12	15	15	143
5	(France) Thomas Neubauer	(France) AKKA ASP Team		**1**	8			**20**	6	9	12				24	18	**7**	2		112.5
6	(Switzerland) Hugo de Sadeleer (Finland) Aaro Vainio	(Switzerland) R-Motorsport		Ret	11			17	7	6	8	68	68	Ret	15	14	9	9		99
7	(Netherlands) Milan Dontje	(Germany) Attempto Racing		10	9			9	18	16	**9**				**6**	15	12	15		97
8	(Australia) Shae Davies	(Belgium) Belgian Audi Club Team WRT	DNS	6	Ret			14	11	17	11				12	17	20	18	24	89
8	(Australia) Shae Davies	(Belgium) Team WRT				24	19					41	42	34						89
9	(Germany) Patrick Assenheimer (Germany) Hubert Haupt	(Germany) Black Falcon	5			20	14					21	40	24					7	87
10	(Netherlands) Rik Breukers	(Belgium) Belgian Audi Club Team WRT	27	9	Ret	Ret		25	9	11	25				11	**6**	16	14		76
11	(Colombia) Óscar Tunjo	(Belgium) Belgian Audi Club Team WRT		9	Ret			25	9	11	25				11	**6**	16	14		75
12	(United States) Taylor Proto	(China) Orange1 FFF Racing Team	10	19	DNS	Ret	17	23	10	22	16	61	52	Ret	22	16	24	23	21	74
13	(Mexico) Diego Menchaca	(China) Orange1 FFF Racing Team	10	19	DNS	Ret	17	23	10	22	16	61	52	Ret	22	16	24	23		70
14	(Italy) Gabriele Piana	(Germany) Black Falcon	5			20	14					21	40	24						69
15	(United Kingdom) Tom Gamble	(Belgium) Belgian Audi Club Team WRT		6	Ret			14	11	17	11				12	17	20	18		64
16	(United Kingdom) Sandy Mitchell (United Kingdom) James Pull (United Kingdom) Jordan Witt	(United Kingdom) Barwell Motorsport	26			15	Ret					20	27	15					18	61
17	(Germany) Fabian Schiller	(France) AKKA ASP Team		15	**18**			5	**26**						10	10				59
18	(Switzerland) Lucas Mauron (France) Arno Santamato (Austria) Gerhard Tweraser	(Austria) GRT Grasser Racing Team	11			8	Ret					42	36	33					33	56
19	(Netherlands) Pieter Schothorst (Netherlands) Steijn Schothorst	(Germany) Attempto Racing	24			**9**	**Ret**					**15**	**62**	**Ret**					15	46
20	(Russia) Denis Bulatov (South Africa) David Perel (Russia) Rinat Salikhov	(Germany) Rinaldi Racing	25			13	16					57	61	Ret					8	46
21	(Switzerland) Philipp Frommenwiler (United States) Matt McMurry	(United Kingdom) Jenson Team Rocket RJN	13			16	22					25	29	31					39	44
22	(United Kingdom) Finlay Hutchison (Spain) Iván Pareras (Germany) Kim-Luis Schramm	(Germany) Phoenix Racing	14			21	12					29	48	Ret					34	42
23	(United Kingdom) Struan Moore	(United Kingdom) Jenson Team Rocket RJN	13			16						25	29	31						42
24	(Italy) Michele Beretta	(China) Orange1 FFF Racing Team	10			Ret	17					61	52	Ret					21	36
24	(Italy) Michele Beretta	(Austria) GRT Grasser Racing Team								19	17									36
25	(Saudi Arabia) Abdulaziz Al Faisal	(Germany) Black Falcon										21	40	24						26
26	(Mexico) Ricardo Sánchez	(Belgium) Belgian Audi Club Team WRT	27			Ret														25
26	(Mexico) Ricardo Sánchez	(United Kingdom) Jenson Team Rocket RJN										25	29	31					39	25
27	(United Kingdom) Alex MacDowall	(Belgium) Belgian Audi Club Team WRT	DNS																24	25
27	(United Kingdom) Alex MacDowall	(Belgium) Team WRT				24	19					41	42	34						25
28	(France) Paul Petit	(Belgium) Belgian Audi Club Team WRT	DNS																	23
28	(France) Paul Petit	(Belgium) Team WRT				24	19					41	42	34						23
29	(Italy) Andrea Amici	(Austria) GRT Grasser Racing Team										42	36	33						22
29	(Italy) Andrea Amici	(China) Orange1 FFF Racing Team																	21	22
30	(Italy) Stefano Gattuso (United Kingdom) Dean Stoneman	(Italy) Ombra Racing	Ret			26	18					56	45	37						20
30	(Belgium) Denis Dupont	(Italy) Ombra Racing				26	18					56	45	37						20
31	(Italy) David Fumanelli	(Germany) Black Falcon																	7	18
32	(Monaco) Benjamin Goethe (South Africa) Jordan Grogor (United Kingdom) Stuart Hall	(United Arab Emirates) GPX Racing	DNS			28	21												9	16
33	(United States) Corey Lewis	(Italy) Ombra Racing										56	45	37						10
34	(Switzerland) Rolf Ineichen	(Austria) GRT Grasser Racing Team								19	17									9
35	(France) Romain Monti	(Italy) Ombra Racing	Ret																	6
35	(France) Romain Monti	(United Kingdom) Strakka Racing																	19	6
35	(Netherlands) Max Koebolt (Belgium) Esteban Muth	(United Kingdom) Strakka Racing																	19	6
36	(United Kingdom) Sean Walkinshaw	(Belgium) Belgian Audi Club Team WRT																	24	2
36	(United Kingdom) Ryan Ratcliffe	(United Kingdom) Jenson Team Rocket RJN					22													2
37	(Italy) Giacomo Altoè	(China) Orange1 FFF Racing Team										61	52	Ret						1
38	(Belgium) Charles Weerts	(Belgium) Belgian Audi Club Team WRT	27			Ret														1
38	(Switzerland) Mauro Calamia (Switzerland) Stefano Monaco (Switzerland) Roberto Pampanini	(Italy) Scuderia Villorba Corse					27													1
	(Italy) Fabrizio Crestani (Germany) Nicolas Pohler (Switzerland) Kris Richard	(Italy) Daiko Lazarus Racing	WD			32	Ret					WD								0
	(United Kingdom) Ricky Collard (Austria) Ferdinand Habsburg	(Switzerland) R-Motorsport										68	68	Ret						0
	(Venezuela) Jonathan Cecotto	(Italy) Daiko Lazarus Racing										WD								
Pos.	Driver	Team	MNZ (Italy)	BRH (United Kingdom)		SIL (United Kingdom)	LEC (France)	MIS (Italy)		ZAN (Netherlands)		6hrs	12hrs	24hrs	NÜR (Germany)		HUN (Hungary)		CAT (Spain)	Points
Pos.	Driver	Team	MNZ (Italy)	BRH (United Kingdom)		SIL (United Kingdom)	LEC (France)	MIS (Italy)		ZAN (Netherlands)		SPA (Belgium)			NÜR (Germany)		HUN (Hungary)		CAT (Spain)	Points

==== Pro-Am Cup ====
Pos.	Driver	Team	MNZ (Italy)	BRH (United Kingdom)		SIL (United Kingdom)	LEC (France)	MIS (Italy)		ZAN (Netherlands)		SPA (Belgium)			NÜR (Germany)		HUN (Hungary)		CAT (Spain)	Points
Pos.	Driver	Team	MNZ (Italy)	BRH (United Kingdom)		SIL (United Kingdom)	LEC (France)	MIS (Italy)		ZAN (Netherlands)		6hrs	12hrs	24hrs	NÜR (Germany)		HUN (Hungary)		CAT (Spain)	Points
1	(Italy) Andrea Bertolini (Belgium) Louis Machiels	(Italy) AF Corse	Ret	**Ret**	Ret	22	28	11	21	20	19	53	59	Ret	23	19	23	26	35	147
2	(France) Jim Pla	(France) AKKA ASP Team	Ret	17	**15**	35	23	19	**24**	23	**22**				27	21	21	**24**	**36**	144.5
3	(Japan) Hiroshi Hamaguchi (United Kingdom) Phil Keen	(China) Orange1 FFF Racing Team		14	14			15	17	18	20				21	20	22	21		131
4	(Republic of Ireland) Charlie Eastwood (Oman) Ahmad Al Harthy (Turkey) Salih Yoluç	Oman Racing with TF Sport	**35**			**23**^{1}	**26**					26	20	22					14	122
5	(South Africa) David Perel (Russia) Rinat Salikhov	(Germany) Rinaldi Racing		13	16			12	22	25	15				**20**	**24**	**25**	Ret		102.5
6	(France) Jean-Luc Beaubelique	(France) AKKA ASP Team	Ret	17	**15**	35	23										21	**24**	**36**	100
7	(Italy) Mauro Ricci	(France) AKKA ASP Team	Ret			35	23	19	**24**	23	**22**				27	21			**36**	92.5
8	(United Kingdom) Tom Onslow-Cole (Netherlands) Remon Vos	(United Kingdom) Ram Racing	38			25	25					**35**	**32**	**26**					Ret	88
9	(United Kingdom) Chris Froggatt (Hong Kong) Jonathan Hui	(United Kingdom) Tempesta Racing	20			27	33					38	37	40					16	86
10	(France) Pierre-Yves Paque	(France) Saintéloc Racing	29				30					62	56	48					11	63
11	(United Kingdom) Darren Burke	(United Kingdom) Ram Racing					25					**35**	**32**	**26**						61
12	(United Kingdom) Chris Buncombe	(United Kingdom) Tempesta Racing	20			27	33												16	61
13	(Netherlands) Niek Hommerson	(Italy) AF Corse	Ret			22	28					53	59	Ret					35	51
14	(Denmark) Nicki Thiim	Oman Racing with TF Sport										26	20	22						49
15	(France) Nyls Stievenart	(France) Saintéloc Racing		DNS	DNS	Ret		**13**	19	**21**	21									40.5
15	(Monaco) Stéphane Ortelli	(France) Saintéloc Racing		DNS	DNS			**13**	19	**21**	21									40.5
16	(Netherlands) Christiaan Frankenhout	(United Kingdom) Ram Racing										**35**	**32**	**26**						37
17	(Germany) Markus Winkelhock	(France) Saintéloc Racing	29			Ret	30													30
18	(United Kingdom) Derek Pierce	(United Kingdom) Team Parker Racing	Ret			30	36					65	66	Ret					23	28
18	(United Kingdom) Seb Morris	(United Kingdom) Team Parker Racing	Ret			30	36												23	28
19	(Italy) David Fumanelli (United Kingdom) Jack Hawksworth (United States) Richard Heistand (Denmark) Christina Nielsen	(United Kingdom) Strakka Racing										45	33	32						27
20	(France) Edouard Cauhaupe (France) Pierre-Alexandre Jean	(France) Saintéloc Racing																	11	25
21	(Italy) Edward Cheever (Italy) Giancarlo Fisichella	(United Kingdom) Tempesta Racing										38	37	40						25
22	(Switzerland) Mathias Beche (Hong Kong) Philippe Descombes (Hong Kong) John Shen (Hong Kong) Benny Simonsen	(Hong Kong) Modena Motorsports										49	38	42						18
23	(France) Fabien Michal	(France) Saintéloc Racing	29			Ret														18
24	(Saudi Arabia) Karim Ojjeh	(Belgium) Boutsen Ginion				39													32	16
24	(United Kingdom) Rob Smith	(United Kingdom) Team Parker Racing	Ret			30	36													16
25	(Switzerland) Mauro Calamia (Switzerland) Ivan Jacoma (Switzerland) Stefano Monaco (Switzerland) Roberto Pampanini	(Italy) Scuderia Villorba Corse										54	50	43						13
26	(France) Philippe Chatelet	(France) Saintéloc Racing					30													12
27	(South Africa) Gennaro Bonafede	(Belgium) Boutsen Ginion																	32	10
28	(France) Michael Blanchemain (France) Simon Gachet (France) Steven Palette	(France) Saintéloc Racing										62	56	48						8
29	(Czech Republic) Josef Král (Italy) Gabriele Lancieri (Italy) Matteo Malucelli (Czech Republic) Jiří Písařík	(Czech Republic) Bohemia Energy racing with Scuderia Praha										48	51	Ret						7
30	(Switzerland) Daniel Allemann (Germany) Ralf Bohn (Germany) Alfred Renauer (Germany) Robert Renauer	(Germany) Herberth Motorsport										39	60	Ret						6
31	(Austria) Philipp Eng (France) Marc Rostan	(Belgium) Boutsen Ginion				39														6
32	(Finland) Toni Vilander	(Italy) AF Corse										53	59	Ret						3
	(United Kingdom) Glynn Geddie (United Kingdom) Andy Meyrick (United Kingdom) Ryan Ratcliffe	(United Kingdom) Team Parker Racing										65	66	Ret						
Entries ineligible to score points
	(Belgium) Loïc Deman (Belgium) Angelique Detavernier (Belgium) Marc Duez (Belgium) Stéphane Lémeret	(Belgium) 1969 Tribute										66	65	Ret						
Pos.	Driver	Team	MNZ (Italy)	BRH (United Kingdom)		SIL (United Kingdom)	LEC (France)	MIS (Italy)		ZAN (Netherlands)		6hrs	12hrs	24hrs	NÜR (Germany)		HUN (Hungary)		CAT (Spain)	Points
Pos.	Driver	Team	MNZ (Italy)	BRH (United Kingdom)		SIL (United Kingdom)	LEC (France)	MIS (Italy)		ZAN (Netherlands)		SPA (Belgium)			NÜR (Germany)		HUN (Hungary)		CAT (Spain)	Points

Notes

- ^{1} – Charlie Eastwood, Ahmad Al Harthy and Salih Yoluç lost the point for Pole position after a breach of article 19.6, after the gantry camera card was not submitted in time.

=== Teams' championships ===
==== Overall ====
Pos.	Team	Manufacturer	MNZ (Italy)	BRH (United Kingdom)		SIL (United Kingdom)	LEC (France)	MIS (Italy)		ZAN (Netherlands)		SPA (Belgium)			NÜR (Germany)		HUN (Hungary)		CAT (Spain)	Points
Pos.	Team	Manufacturer	MNZ (Italy)	BRH (United Kingdom)		SIL (United Kingdom)	LEC (France)	MIS (Italy)		ZAN (Netherlands)		6hrs	12hrs	24hrs	NÜR (Germany)		HUN (Hungary)		CAT (Spain)	Points
1	(China) Orange1 FFF Racing Team	Lamborghini	2	14	2	2	3	1	2	3	7	19	16	8	1	3	5	4	1	185
2	(Germany) Black Falcon (Germany) Mercedes-AMG Team Black Falcon	Mercedes-AMG	3	**2**	1	7	14	3	4	4	4	**3**	**3**	**3**	8	4	2	3	7	156.5
3	(France) AKKA ASP Team (France) Mercedes-AMG Team AKKA ASP	Mercedes-AMG	4	1	**8**	10	11	2	**6**	**1**	6	4	7	13	9	18	**1**	**1**	5	144.5
4	(Austria) GRT Grasser Racing Team	Lamborghini	**11**	3	10	**8**	7	6	16	2	2	2	6	16	**2**	8	3	2	33	116
5	(Belgium) Audi Sport Team WRT (Belgium) Belgian Audi Club Team WRT (Belgium) Team WRT	Audi	18	6	6	3	13	**14**	1	5	3	9	8	12	4	**6**	8	7	24	96.5
6	(Switzerland) R-Motorsport	Aston Martin	19	7	5	17	4	4	7	6	8	5	25	19	7	1	9	9	2	95
7	(France) Saintéloc Racing (France) Audi Sport Team Saintéloc	Audi	15	16	7	11	9	13	3	10	**1**	12	10	4	3	2	6	6	11	87.5
8	(Russia) SMP Racing	Ferrari	23			1	2					1	1	51					13	73
9	(Germany) Rowe Racing	Porsche	8			4	5					10	9	2					**6**	65
10	(Germany) Attempto Racing	Audi	7	5	3	9	8	7	8	12	9	15	30	30	6	12	4	10	10	62.5
11	(United Kingdom) Bentley Team M-Sport (United Kingdom) M-Sport Team Bentley	Bentley	6			12	**1**					16	28	29					3	59
12	(Italy) Dinamic Motorsport	Porsche	1			18	37					18	4	27			28	27	Ret	32
13	(United Arab Emirates) GPX Racing	Porsche	DNS			28	21					11	18	1					9	31
14	(Germany) Phoenix Racing	Audi	14	8	12	21	12	10	5	8	10	29	48	Ret	13	9	14	11	34	23
15	(United Kingdom) Strakka Racing (United Kingdom) Mercedes-AMG Team Strakka Racing	Mercedes-AMG	22			5	Ret					32	12	20					19	11
16	(Germany) Rinaldi Racing	Ferrari	25	13	16	13	16	12	22	25	15	47	35	28	20	24	25	Ret	8	10
17	(France) Tech 1 Racing	Lexus	32			31	Ret			15	Ret	51	47	44	19	5	26	22	37	7.5
18	(United Kingdom) Garage 59	Aston Martin	9			33	24					40	41	47					22	4
18	(United Kingdom) Barwell Motorsport	Lamborghini	16			15	29					20	27	15					18	4
19	(Italy) AF Corse (United Kingdom) Tempesta Racing	Ferrari	20	Ret	Ret	22	28	11	21	20	19	38	37	40	23	19	23	26	16	3
20	(United Kingdom) Jenson Team Rocket RJN	Honda	13			16	22					25	29	31					39	1
	Oman Racing with TF Sport	Aston Martin	35			23	26					26	20	22					14	0
	(Austria) HB Racing	Ferrari	36	18	17	37	Ret	18	23	24	23	43	43	38	26	22	27	25		0
	(Italy) Ombra Racing	Lamborghini	Ret			26	18					56	45	37						0
	(Italy) Raton Racing by Target	Lamborghini	28			34	35					46	39	36					20	0
	(United Kingdom) Team Parker Racing	Bentley	Ret			30	36					65	66	Ret					23	0
	(Belgium) Boutsen Ginion	BMW; Lamborghini	31			38	32	24	27			60	54	46					30	0
	(United Kingdom) Ram Racing	Mercedes-AMG	38			25	25					35	32	26					Ret	0
	(Italy) Scuderia Villorba Corse	Mercedes-AMG					27					54	50	43						0
	(Italy) Daiko Lazarus Racing	Lamborghini	WD			32	Ret					55	49	Ret					Ret	0
Entries ineligible to score points
	(Hong Kong) Mercedes-AMG Team GruppeM Racing	Mercedes-AMG										13	2	10						
	(Italy) Honda Team Motul	Honda										7	19	6						
	(Germany) Walkenhorst Motorsport	BMW										8	5	11						
	(Germany) KÜS Team75 Bernhard	Porsche										22	23	9						
	(Germany) BMW Team Schnitzer	BMW										8	13	Ret						
	(Italy) Audi Sport Italia	Audi						16	20											
	(Hong Kong) KCMG	Nissan										27	26	18						
	(Germany) GetSpeed Performance	Mercedes-AMG						21	25											
	(Switzerland) Kessel Racing	Ferrari													25	23				
	(Japan) Goodsmile Racing & Type-Moon Racing	Mercedes-AMG										34	55	Ret						
	(Germany) Herberth Motorsport	Porsche										39	60	Ret						
	(Hong Kong) Modena Motorsports	Porsche										49	38	42						
	(Hong Kong) OpenRoad Racing	Porsche										59	53	45						
	(Czech Republic) Bohemia Energy racing with Scuderia Praha	Ferrari										48	51	Ret						
	(China) Audi Sport R8 LMS Cup	Audi										63	58	50						
	(Belgium) 1969 Tribute	Porsche										66	65	Ret						
	(France) 3Y Technology	BMW										67	67	Ret						
	(Taiwan) HubAuto Corsa	Ferrari										69	69	Ret						
	(Italy) Antonelli Motorsport	Mercedes-AMG	Ret																	
Pos.	Team	Manufacturer	MNZ (Italy)	BRH (United Kingdom)		SIL (United Kingdom)	LEC (France)	MIS (Italy)		ZAN (Netherlands)		6hrs	12hrs	24hrs	NÜR (Germany)		HUN (Hungary)		CAT (Spain)	Points
Pos.	Team	Manufacturer	MNZ (Italy)	BRH (United Kingdom)		SIL (United Kingdom)	LEC (France)	MIS (Italy)		ZAN (Netherlands)		SPA (Belgium)			NÜR (Germany)		HUN (Hungary)		CAT (Spain)	Points

==== Silver Cup ====
Pos.	Team	Manufacturer	MNZ (Italy)	BRH (United Kingdom)		SIL (United Kingdom)	LEC (France)	MIS (Italy)		ZAN (Netherlands)		SPA (Belgium)			NÜR (Germany)		HUN (Hungary)		CAT (Spain)	Points
Pos.	Team	Manufacturer	MNZ (Italy)	BRH (United Kingdom)		SIL (United Kingdom)	LEC (France)	MIS (Italy)		ZAN (Netherlands)		6hrs	12hrs	24hrs	NÜR (Germany)		HUN (Hungary)		CAT (Spain)	Points
1	(France) AKKA ASP Team	Mercedes-AMG	**4**	**1**	**8**	10	11	**5**	**6**	**9**	12	14	14	17	10	10	**7**	**5**	**5**	291.5
2	(Germany) Attempto Racing	Audi	24	10	9	**9**	**Ret**	9	18	16	**9**	**15**	**62**	**Ret**	**6**	15	12	15	15	148
3	(Belgium) Belgian Audi Club Team WRT (Belgium) Team WRT	Audi	27	6	Ret	25	19	14	9	11	11	41	42	34	11	**6**	16	14	24	120
4	(Switzerland) R-Motorsport	Aston Martin		Ret	11			17	7	6	8	68	68	Ret	15	14	9	9		103
5	(China) Orange1 FFF Racing Team	Lamborghini	10	19	DNS	Ret	17	23	10	22	16	61	52	Ret	22	16	24	23	21	87.5
6	(Germany) Black Falcon	Mercedes-AMG	5			20	14					21	40	24					7	87
7	(Austria) GRT Grasser Racing Team	Lamborghini	11			8	Ret			19	17	42	36	33					33	66.5
8	(United Kingdom) Barwell Motorsport	Lamborghini	26			15	Ret					20	27	15					18	61
9	(Germany) Rinaldi Racing	Ferrari	25			13	16					57	61	Ret					8	46
10	(United Kingdom) Jenson Team Rocket RJN	Honda	13			16	22					25	29	31					39	44
11	(Germany) Phoenix Racing	Audi	14			22	12					29	48	Ret					34	42
12	(Italy) Ombra Racing	Lamborghini	Ret			26	18					56	45	37						20
13	(United Arab Emirates) GPX Racing	Porsche	DNS			28	21												9	16
14	(United Kingdom) Strakka Racing	Mercedes-AMG																	19	6
15	(Italy) Scuderia Villorba Corse	Mercedes-AMG					27													1
	(Italy) Daiko Lazarus Racing	Lamborghini	WD			32	Ret					WD								0
Pos.	Team	Manufacturer	MNZ (Italy)	BRH (United Kingdom)		SIL (United Kingdom)	LEC (France)	MIS (Italy)		ZAN (Netherlands)		6hrs	12hrs	24hrs	NÜR (Germany)		HUN (Hungary)		CAT (Spain)	Points
Pos.	Team	Manufacturer	MNZ (Italy)	BRH (United Kingdom)		SIL (United Kingdom)	LEC (France)	MIS (Italy)		ZAN (Netherlands)		SPA (Belgium)			NÜR (Germany)		HUN (Hungary)		CAT (Spain)	Points

==== Pro-Am Cup ====
Pos.	Team	Manufacturer	MNZ (Italy)	BRH (United Kingdom)		SIL (United Kingdom)	LEC (France)	MIS (Italy)		ZAN (Netherlands)		SPA (Belgium)			NÜR (Germany)		HUN (Hungary)		CAT (Spain)	Points
Pos.	Team	Manufacturer	MNZ (Italy)	BRH (United Kingdom)		SIL (United Kingdom)	LEC (France)	MIS (Italy)		ZAN (Netherlands)		6hrs	12hrs	24hrs	NÜR (Germany)		HUN (Hungary)		CAT (Spain)	Points
1	(Italy) AF Corse (United Kingdom) Tempesta Racing	Ferrari	20	**Ret**	Ret	22	28	11	21	20	19	38	37	40	23	19	23	26	16	201
2	(France) AKKA ASP Team	Mercedes-AMG	Ret	17	**15**	35	23	19	**24**	23	**22**				27	21	21	**24**	**36**	148.5
3	(China) Orange1 FFF Racing Team	Lamborghini		14	14			15	17	18	20				21	20	22	21		131
4	Oman Racing with TF Sport	Aston Martin	**35**			**23**^{1}	**26**					26	20	22					14	122
5	(France) Saintéloc Racing	Audi	29	DNS	DNS	Ret	30	**13**	19	**21**	21	62	56	48					11	111.5
6	(Germany) Rinaldi Racing	Ferrari		13	16			12	22	25	15				**20**	**24**	**25**	Ret		102.5
7	(United Kingdom) Ram Racing	Mercedes-AMG	38			25	25					**35**	**32**	**26**					Ret	88
8	(United Kingdom) Team Parker Racing	Bentley	Ret			30	36					65	66	Ret					23	39
9	(United Kingdom) Strakka Racing	Mercedes-AMG										45	33	32						27
10	(Italy) Scuderia Villorba Corse	Mercedes-AMG										54	50	43						14
11	(Belgium) Boutsen Ginion	BMW				39													32	18
Entries ineligible to score points
	(Hong Kong) Modena Motorsports	Porsche										49	38	42						
	(Germany) Herberth Motorsport	Porsche										39	60	Ret						
	(Czech Republic) Bohemia Energy racing with Scuderia Praha	Ferrari										48	51	Ret						
	(Belgium) 1969 Tribute	Porsche										66	65	Ret						
Pos.	Team	Manufacturer	MNZ (Italy)	BRH (United Kingdom)		SIL (United Kingdom)	LEC (France)	MIS (Italy)		ZAN (Netherlands)		6hrs	12hrs	24hrs	NÜR (Germany)		HUN (Hungary)		CAT (Spain)	Points
Pos.	Team	Manufacturer	MNZ (Italy)	BRH (United Kingdom)		SIL (United Kingdom)	LEC (France)	MIS (Italy)		ZAN (Netherlands)		SPA (Belgium)			NÜR (Germany)		HUN (Hungary)		CAT (Spain)	Points

Notes

- ^{1} – Oman Racing with TF Sport lost the point for Pole position after a breach of article 19.6, after the gantry camera card was not submitted in time.

== See also ==
- 2019 Blancpain GT Series Endurance Cup
- 2019 Blancpain GT World Challenge Europe
- 2019 Blancpain GT World Challenge Asia
- 2019 Blancpain GT World Challenge America
