= Alessandro Balzan =

Italian auto racing driver

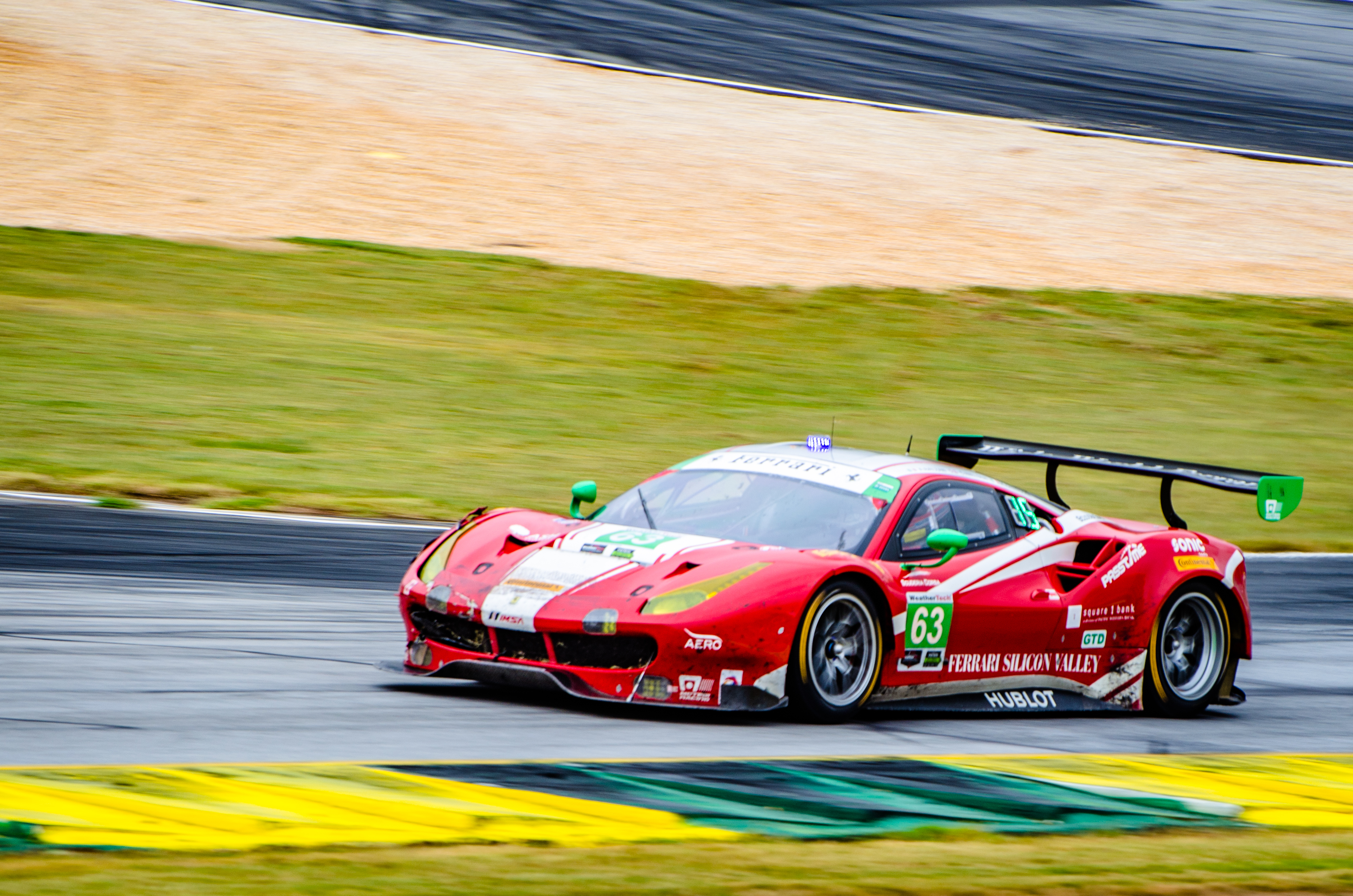
- Balzan in his IMSA title-winning Ferrari in 2017
- Nationality: (Italy) Italian
- Born: October 17, 1980 (age 46) Rovigo, Italy
- Categorisation: FIA Gold (until 2026); FIA Silver (2027–)

Championship titles
- 2026 2024 2016–2017 2013 2012 2009–2011 2002: Italian GT Championship Endurance Cup - GT3; Le Mans Cup - GT3; IMSA SportsCar Championship - GTD; Rolex Sports Car Series - GT; Ferrari Challenge Europe - Trofeo Pirelli; Porsche Carrera Cup Italia; Alfa 147 Cup Italy

Alessandro Balzan (born 17 October 1980 in Rovigo) is an Italian auto racing driver.

== Racing career ==
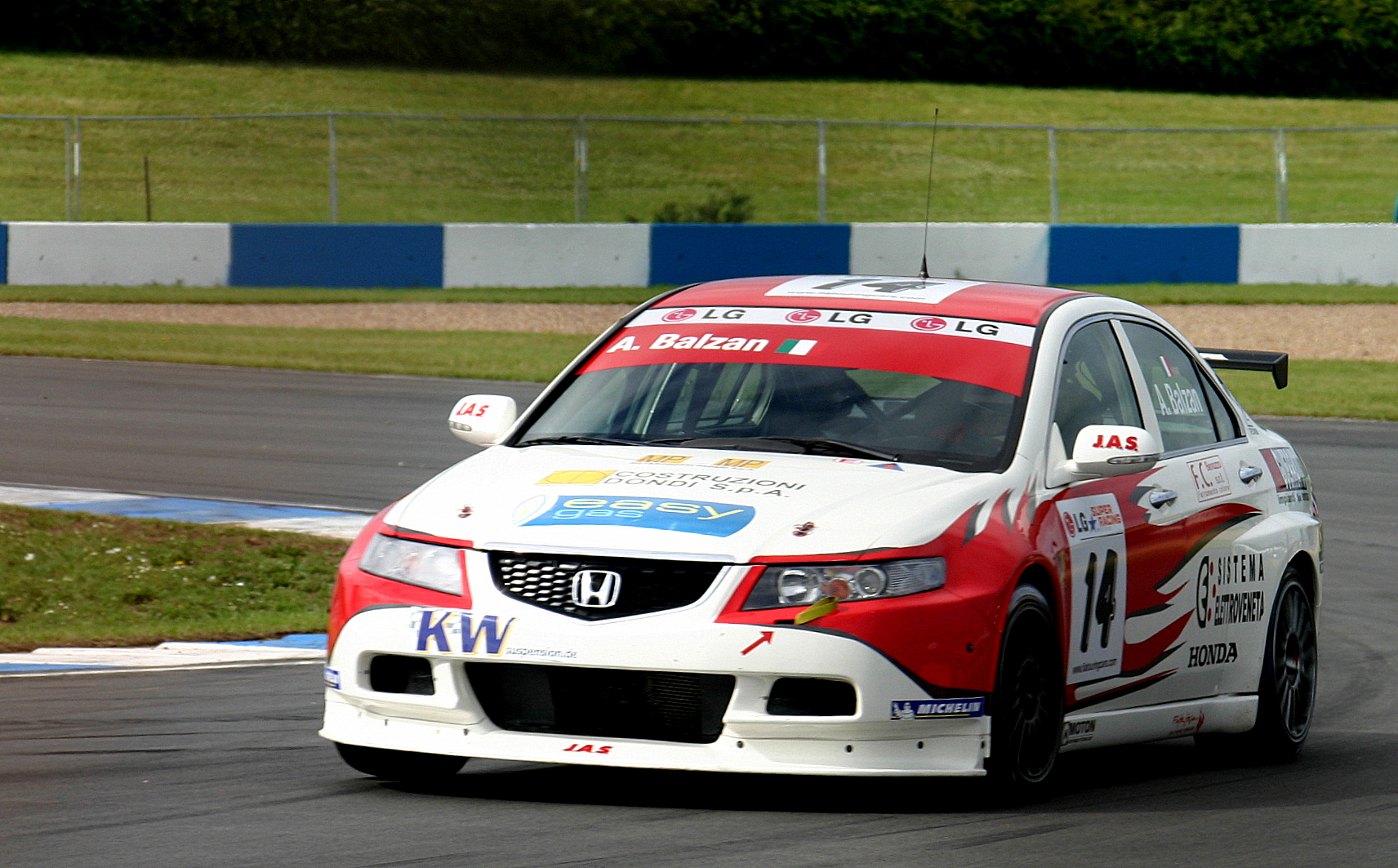
Balzan in a Honda Accord Euro R during the 2004 European Touring Car Championship.

In 1998, Balzen stepped up from Kart racing, by competing in Italian Formula Campus and the Italian Renault Megane Cup Winter Series. A year later, he drove in the Italian Renault Clio V6 Cup Winter Series, along with selected rounds of the Italian Renault Megane Cup. 2000 saw him finish the season fourth on points in the Renault Clio V6 Eurocup. That year, he also became champion in the Italian Renault Clio Cup Winter Series. Another title followed in 2002, winning the Italian Alfa 147 Cup.

Balzan progressed up to the European Touring Car Championship for the 2003 season. He raced an Alfa Romeo for the Bigazzi Team, and in 2004 he drove a JAS ran Honda. In 2005 and 2006, he drove in the Italian Superturismo Championship.

Balzan competed in the inaugural season of the World Touring Car Championship in 2005, for the independent Scuderia del Girasole Team in a SEAT Toledo. Competing in five rounds, his best finish was an eleventh place in round two of the opening event at Monza. He returned to the WTCC in 2006 for the opening four rounds, this time in an Alfa Romeo 156 for DB Motorsport. Balzan managed a fourth-place finish, in race two at Monza.

For 2007, Balzan competed in the Superstars Series in a Jaguar S-Type. In 2008, he drove a Ferrari F430 in the Italian GT Championship.

In the 2008, Balzan drove the Ferrari 430 GT2 in the Italian Gt championship, he won two races and several times he finished on the podium.

Balzan won the Porsche Carrera Cup from 2009 to 2011. In 2011, he set the world fastest lap ever during the Porsche Supercup qualifying at Monza, during the Formula One Grand Prix.

In 2012, Balzan was the Ferrari 458 Challenge WORLD and EUROPEAN Champion with Ferrari team Moscow.

In 2013, Balzen competed in the GRAND AM Season 458 GT3. He also competed in that years 24 hours of Daytona, where he finished in fourth. After a long season, he won the last Rolex Gt Grand Am championship.

== Racing record ==
=== Career summary ===
Season	Series	Team	Races	Wins	Poles	FLaps	Podiums	Points	Position
1998	Renault Megane Winter Cup Italy		?	?	?	?	?	?	?
1998	Formula Renault Campus Italy		?	?	?	?	?	?	6th
1999	Renault Clio V6 Winter Cup Italy		?	?	?	?	?	?	?
1999	Renault Megane Sport Cup Italy		?	?	?	?	?	?	?
2000	Renault Clio V6 Trophy		?	?	?	?	?	?	?
2000	Renault Clio Trophy Europe		?	?	?	?	?	81	4th
2001	Coupe d'Europe Renault		?	?	?	?	?	170	**2nd**
2002	Alfa 147 Cup Italy		?	?	?	?	?	?	**1st**
2002	Coupe d'Europe Renault		?	?	?	?	?	2	27th
2003	European Touring Car Championship	Scuderia Bigazzi	20	0	0	0	1	10	14th
2004	European Touring Car Championship	JAS Motorsport	20	0	0	0	0	3	17th
2005	World Touring Car Championship	Scuderia del Girasole	6	0	0	0	0	0	NC
2005	Italian Superturismo Championship	Scuderia del Girasole	13	3	0	1	6	64	4th
2005	European Touring Car Cup - S2000	SEAT Sport Italia	2	0	0	0	0	1	9th
2006	World Touring Car Championship	DB Motorsport	4	0	0	0	0	5	22nd
2006	Italian Superturismo Championship	DB Motorsport	12	1	0	1	8	63	**3rd**
2006	Eurocup Renault Mégane V6 Trophy	Oregon Team	?	?	?	?	?	4	26th
2007	Superstars Series	Jaguar Dealers Team	8	1	2	1	3	85	**2nd**
2008	Italian GT Championship - GT2	Racing Team Edil-Cris	?	?	?	?	?	57	16th
2009	Porsche Supercup	Ebimotors	2	0	0	0	0	0‡	NC‡
2009	Porsche Carrera Cup Italia	Ebimotors	16	4	3	3	12	441	**1st**
2010	Porsche Supercup	Ebimotors	1	0	0	0	0	0‡	NC‡
2010	Porsche Carrera Cup Italia	Ebimotors	14	3	3	3	7	134	**1st**
2011	Porsche Supercup	Ebimotors	1	0	1	0	1	0‡	NC‡
2011	Porsche Carrera Cup Italia	Ebimotors	13	8	4	7	10	197	**1st**
2011	Porsche Carrera World Cup	Ebimotors	1	0	0	0	0	N/A	12th
2012	Italian GT Championship - GT3	Ebimotors	14	3	2	2	6	131	6th
2012	Rolex Sports Car Series - GT	Scuderia Corsa	2	0	1	1	1	58	34th
2012	Ferrari Challenge Europe - Trofeo Pirelli	Ferrari Moscow	12	8	9	8	12	260	**1st**
2012	Endurance Champions Cup - Gold		?	?	?	?	?	15	**3rd**
2013	Rolex Sports Car Series - GT	Scuderia Corsa Michelotto	12	1	1	0	6	341	**1st**
2014	Blancpain Sprint Series	Scuderia Villorba Corse	4	0	0	0	0	6	24th
2014	United SportsCar Championship - GTD	Scuderia Corsa	11	2	0	0	3	240	13th
2014	Italian GT Championship - GT3	MP1 Corse	10	2	2	1	5	98	6th
2015	Italian GT Championship - GT3	MP1 Corse	2	0	0	0	0	3	47th
2015	Pirelli World Challenge - GT	NGT Motorsport	1	1	0	0	1	144	35th
2015	International GT Open - GT3 Pro-Am	Scuderia Villorba Corse	13	1	2	2	5	53	4th
2015	Blancpain Endurance Series - Pro-Am	Attempto Racing	1	0	0	0	0	0‡	NC‡
2016	IMSA SportsCar Championship - GTD	Scuderia Corsa	11	2	0	0	7	332	1st
2016	IMSA SportsCar Championship - GTLM	Scuderia Corsa	1	0	0	0	0	26	26th
2016	Blancpain GT Series Endurance Cup	AF Corse	4	0	0	0	0	0‡	NC‡
2017	IMSA SportsCar Championship - GTD	Scuderia Corsa	12	1	0	0	8	340	1st
2017	FIA World Endurance Championship - LMGTE Am	Scuderia Corsa	1	0	0	0	0	0‡	NC‡
2017	24 Hours of Le Mans - LMGTE Am	Scuderia Corsa	1	0	0	0	0	N/A	44th
2018	IMSA SportsCar Championship - GTD	Scuderia Corsa	3	0	0	0	1	76	30th
2019	Italian GT Endurance Championship - GT3 Pro	Easy Race	2	0	0	0	1	0‡	NC‡
2019	Blancpain GT World Challenge America - Pro-Am	Scuderia Corsa	2	0	0	0	0	0‡	NC‡
2020	IMSA SportsCar Championship - GTD	Scuderia Corsa	4	1	0	0	1	111	23rd
2020	GT World Challenge America - Pro-Am	Squadra Corse	1	0	1	0	1	0‡	NC‡
2020	Intercontinental GT Challenge	Squadra Corse	1	0	0	0	0	0‡	NC‡
2022	GT World Challenge Europe Endurance Cup	AF Corse	5	0	0	0	0	0‡	NC‡
2022	GT World Challenge Europe Endurance Cup - Gold	AF Corse	5	0	0	0	2	51	6th
2022	FIA World Endurance Championship - LMGTE Am	Iron Lynx	1	0	0	0	0	0	33rd
2022	24 Hours of Le Mans - LMGTE Am	Iron Lynx	1	0	0	0	0	N/A	NC
2022	Intercontinental GT Challenge	AF Corse Conquest Racing	2	0	0	0	0	0‡	NC‡
2022	GT World Challenge America - Pro	Conquest Racing	3	0	1	0	2	0‡	NC‡
2023	IMSA SportsCar Championship - GTD	Cetilar Racing	1	0	0	0	0	103	71st
2023	GT World Challenge America - Pro	Conquest Racing	12	2	1	1	4	170	5th
2023	Intercontinental GT Challenge	Conquest Racing	1	0	0	0	0	0‡	NC‡
2023	Italian GT Sprint Championship - GT Cup Pro-Am	Pellin Racing	2	1	0	1	2	0‡	NC‡
2024	IMSA SportsCar Championship - GTD	Conquest Racing	1	0	0	0	1	325	50th
2024	Le Mans Cup - GT3	AF Corse	7	4	0	0	7	133.5	**1st**
2025	IMSA SportsCar Championship - GTD	Triarsi Competizione	1	0	0	0	0	207	75th
2025–26	Asian Le Mans Series - GT	Kessel Racing	6	0	0	0	0	1	30th
2026	Italian GT Championship Endurance Cup - GT3	Rinaldi Racing	4	1	0	1	2	58	**1st**
2026	GT World Challenge Europe Endurance Cup	Rinaldi Racing	1	0	0	0	0	0	NC
2026	International GT Open	Rinaldi Racing	2	0	0	0	0	6	37th

‡ Not eligible for points

=== Complete European Touring Car Championship results ===
(key) (Races in bold indicate pole position) (Races in italics indicate fastest lap)

Year	Team	Car	1	2	3	4	5	6	7	8	9	10	11	12	13	14	15	16	17	18	19	20	DC	Pts
2003	Scuderia Bigazzi	Alfa Romeo 156 GTA	VAL; 1; 10	VAL; 2; 12	MAG; 1 Ret	MAG; 2 Ret	PER; 1; 8	**PER**; **2**; 3	BRN; 1; 7	**BRN**; **2** Ret	DON; 1; 16†	DON; 2; 15	SPA; 1; 14	SPA; 2; 10	AND; 1; 13	AND; 2; 8	OSC; 1; 15	OSC; 2; 10	EST; 1; 9	EST; 2; 11	MNZ; 1 Ret	MNZ; 2; 11	14th	10
2004	JAS Motorsport	Honda Accord Euro R	MNZ; 1; 14	MNZ; 2; 12	VAL; 1; 12	VAL; 2; 13	MAG; 1; 14	MAG; 2; 10	HOC; 1; 13	HOC; 2 Ret	BRN; 1; 13	BRN; 2; 10	DON; 1; 15	DON; 2; 11	SPA; 1; 11	SPA; 2; 10	IMO; 1; 10	IMO; 2; 6	OSC; 1 Ret	OSC; 2 DNS	DUB; 1 Ret	DUB; 2 DNS	17th	3

=== Complete World Touring Car Championship results ===
(key) (Races in bold indicate pole position) (Races in italics indicate fastest lap)

Year	Team	Car	1	2	3	4	5	6	7	8	9	10	11	12	13	14	15	16	17	18	19	20	DC	Pts
2005	Scuderia del Girasole	SEAT Toledo Cupra	ITA; 1; 18	ITA; 2; 11	FRA; 1 Ret	FRA; 2 DNS	GBR; 1	GBR; 2	SMR; 1; 12	SMR; 2 DSQ	MEX; 1	MEX; 2	BEL; 1	BEL; 2	GER; 1	GER; 2	TUR; 1	TUR; 2	ESP; 1	ESP; 2	MAC; 1	MAC; 2	NC	0
2006	DB Motorsport	Alfa Romeo 156	ITA; 1; 9	ITA; 2; 4	FRA; 1 Ret	FRA; 2; 17	GBR; 1	GBR; 2	GER; 1	GER; 2	BRA; 1	BRA; 2	MEX; 1	MEX; 2	CZE; 1	CZE; 2	TUR; 1	TUR; 2	ESP; 1	ESP; 2	MAC; 1	MAC; 2	22nd	5

=== Complete Porsche Supercup results ===
(key) (Races in bold indicate pole position) (Races in italics indicate fastest lap)

Year	Team	Car	1	2	3	4	5	6	7	8	9	10	11	12	13	DC	Pts
2009	Ebimotors	Porsche 997 GT3	BHR	BHR	ESP	MON	TUR	GBR	GER	HUN	ESP	BEL	ITA	UAE; 18†	UAE; 5	NC‡	0‡
2010	Ebimotors	Porsche 997 GT3	BHR	BHR	ESP	MON	ESP	GBR	GER	HUN	BEL	ITA; 6				NC‡	0‡
2011	Ebimotors	Porsche 997 GT3	TUR	ESP	MON	GER	GBR	GER	HUN	BEL	**ITA**; 3	UAE	UAE			NC‡	0‡

‡ Not eligible for points

=== Complete Grand-Am Rolex Sports Car Series results ===
(key) (Races in bold indicate pole position; races in italics indicate fastest lap)

Year	Team	Class	Make	Engine	1	2	3	4	5	6	7	8	9	10	11	12	13	Rank	Points	Ref
2012	Scuderia Corsa	GT	Ferrari 458 Italia Grand-Am	Ferrari F136 F 4.5 L V8	DAY	BAR	HOM	NJ	DET	LEX	ELK	WGI	IMS	WGI	MON	**LAG**; 4	LRP; 3	34th	58	
2013	Scuderia Corsa	GT	Ferrari 458 Italia Grand-Am	Ferrari F136 F 4.5 L V8	DAY; 4	**COA**; 11	BAR; 2	ATL; 3	DET; 2	MOH; 6	WGL; 5	IMS; 5	ELK; 6	KAN; 1	LAG; 3	LRP; 2		1st	341	

=== Complete IMSA SportsCar Championship results ===
(key) (Races in bold indicate pole position; races in italics indicate fastest lap)

Year	Entrant	Class	Make	Engine	1	2	3	4	5	6	7	8	9	10	11	12	Rank	Points	Ref
2014	Scuderia Corsa	GTD	Ferrari 458 Italia GT3	Ferrari F136 F 4.5 L V8	DAY; 11	SEB; 18	LGA; 7	DET; 1	WGL; 5	MOS; 17†	IND; 1	ELK; 16†	VIR; 2	COA; 11	PET; 9		13th	240	
2016	Scuderia Corsa	GTD	Ferrari 488 GT3	Ferrari F154CB 3.9 L Turbo V8	DAY; 6	SEB; 1		LGA; 2	BEL; 3	WGL; 1	MOS; 4	LIM; 11	ELK; 3	VIR; 7	COA; 3	PET; 2	1st	332	
2016	Scuderia Corsa	GTLM	Ferrari 488 GTE	Ferrari F154CB 3.9 L Turbo V8			LBH; 6										26th	26	
2017	Scuderia Corsa	GTD	Ferrari 488 GT3	Ferrari F154CB 3.9 L Turbo V8	DAY; 16	SEB; 2	LBH; 3	AUS; 2	DET; 2	WGL; 2	MOS; 3	LIM; 6	ELK; 5	VIR; 12	LGA; 1	PET; 9	1st	340	
2018	Scuderia Corsa	GTD	Ferrari 488 GT3	Ferrari F154CB 3.9 L Turbo V8	DAY; 10	SEB; 2	MOH; 8	BEL	WGL	MOS	LIM	ELK	VIR	LGA	PET		30th	76	
2020	Scuderia Corsa	GTD	Ferrari 488 GT3	Ferrari F154CB 3.9 L Turbo V8	DAY; 7	DAY	SEB	ELK	VIR	ATL	MOH	CLT	PET; 1	LGA; 7	SEB; 4		23rd	111	
2023	Cetilar Racing	GTD	Ferrari 296 GT3	Ferrari F163CE 3.0 L Turbo V6	DAY; 23	SEB	LBH	LGA	WGL	MOS	LIM	ELK	VIR	IMS	PET		71st	103	
2024	Conquest Racing	GTD	Ferrari 296 GT3	Ferrari F163CE 3.0 L Turbo V6	DAY; 3	SEB	LBH	LGA	WGL	MOS	ELK	VIR	IMS	PET			50th	325	
2025	Triarsi Competizione	GTD	Ferrari 296 GT3	Ferrari F163CE 3.0 L Turbo V6	DAY	SEB	LBH	LGA	WGL; 12	MOS	ELK	VIR	IMS	PET			75th	207	

^{†} Balzan did not complete sufficient laps in order to score full points.

=== Complete 24 Hours of Le Mans results ===
Year	Team	Co-Drivers	Car	Class	Laps	Pos.	Class Pos.
2017	(United States) Scuderia Corsa	(Denmark) Christina Nielsen (United States) Bret Curtis	Ferrari 488 GTE	GTE; Am	314	44th	14th
2022	(Italy) Iron Lynx	(Italy) Raffaele Giammaria (Italy) Claudio Schiavoni	Ferrari 488 GTE Evo	GTE; Am	289	NC	NC

=== Complete GT World Challenge Europe results ===
==== GT World Challenge Europe Sprint Cup ====
(key) (Races in bold indicate pole position; races in italics indicate fastest lap)

Year	Team	Car	Class	1	2	3	4	5	6	7	8	9	10	11	12	13	14	Pos.	Points
2014	Scuderia Villorba Corse	Ferrari 458 Italia GT3	Pro	NOG; QR	NOG; CR	BRH; QR	BRH; CR	ZAN; QR; 17	ZAN; CR; DNS	SVK; QR	SVK; CR	ALG; QR	ALG; CR	ZOL; QR; 9	ZOL; CR; 7	BAK; QR	BAK; CR	24th	6

==== GT World Challenge Europe Endurance Cup ====
(key) (Races in bold indicate pole position; races in italics indicate fastest lap)

Year	Team	Car	Class	1	2	3	4	5	6	7	Pos.	Points
2015	Attempto Racing	McLaren 650S GT3	Pro-Am	MNZ; 40	SIL	LEC	SPA; 6H	SPA; 12H	SPA; 24H	NÜR	NC	0
2016	AF Corse	Ferrari 458 Italia GT3	Pro	MNZ; Ret	SIL; 14	LEC; Ret	SPA; 6H; 46	SPA; 12H; 43	SPA; 24H; 27	NÜR	NC	0
2022	AF Corse	Ferrari 488 GT3 Evo 2020	Gold	IMO; 19	LEC; 21	SPA; 6H; 52	SPA; 12H; 47	SPA; 24H; 33	HOC; 19	CAT; 44†	6th	51
2026	Rinaldi Racing	Ferrari 296 GT3 Evo	Silver	LEC	MNZ	SPA; 6H; 42	SPA; 12H; 29	SPA; 24H; 14	NÜR	ALG	17th	29

Sporting positions
Preceded by Luigi Ferrara	Porsche Carrera Cup Italy; Champion; 2009-2011	Succeeded by Vito Postiglione
