= 2011 Porsche Carrera Cup Italia =

Italian motorsport series

2011 Porsche Carrera Cup Italy

Seasons
- ← 2010 2012 →

The 2011 Porsche Carrera Cup Italia season was the fifth Porsche Carrera Cup Italy season. It began on 30 April in Imola and finished on 16 October in Monza. Alessandro Balzan won the championship driving for Ebimotors, which won the teams' championship.

== Teams and drivers ==
Team	No.	Drivers	Class	Rounds
(Italy) Ebimotors	1	(Italy) Alessandro Balzan		All
(Italy) Ebimotors	2	(Italy) Marco Mapelli	U	All
(Italy) Ebimotors	23	(Italy) Alessandro Bonacini		All
(Italy) Ebimotors	55	(Italy) Stefano Pezzucchi	M	5
(Italy) Petricorse Motorsport	3	(Italy) Alex Frassineti	U	All
(Italy) Petricorse Motorsport	5	(Italy) Vito Postiglione		All
(Italy) Petricorse Motorsport	8	(Italy) Andrea Amici	U	1-3, 5-7
(Italy) Petricorse Motorsport	10	(Ukraine) Oleksandr Gaidai		All
(Italy) Antonelli Motorsport	4	(Italy) Massimo Monti		All
(Italy) Antonelli Motorsport	52	(Italy) Angelo Proietti	M	All
(Italy) Antonelli Motorsport	99	(Italy) Massimo Giondi	M	1-3, 5-7
(Italy) AB Racing Team	7	(Italy) Stefano Comandini		All
(Italy) AB Racing Team	12	(Italy) Stefano Costantini		1-3, 5-7
(Italy) Heaven Motorsport	9	(Italy) Enrico Fulgenzi	U	All
(Italy) Heaven Motorsport	59	(Italy) Alberto Petrini	M	1-3, 5
(Italy) Centro Porsche Padova	14	(Italy) Massimiliano Busnelli		All
(Italy) Centro Porsche Padova	60	(Italy) Giorgio Piccioni	M	All
(Italy) Centro Porsche Padova	73	(Italy) Raffaele Giannoni	M	3, 5
(Italy) GT Motorsport by Autotecnica Tadini	19	(Italy) Walter Ben		1-3, 5-7
(Italy) Erre Esse Motorsport	42	(Italy) Gianluca Giraudi		1-3, 5-7
(Italy) Erre Esse Motorsport	62	(Italy) Alberto de Amicis	M	All
(Italy) Erre Esse Motorsport	72	(Italy) Stefano Maestri	M	1, 3, 5-6
(Italy) Erre Esse Motorsport	72	(Italy) Omar Galbiati	M	7
(Italy) Erre Esse Motorsport	73	(Italy) Raffaele Giannoni	M	2
(Germany) Pole Team	69	(Germany) Günther Blieninger	M	1-3, 5-7
(Italy) Go Race	94	(Italy) Marco Bonamico	M	1-3, 5-6
(Italy) Go Race	94	(Italy) Marco Cassarà	M	7

Icon	Class
M	Michelin Cup
U	Under-25 Trophy

== Race calendar and results ==
Round		Circuit	Date	Pole position	Fastest lap	Winning driver	Winning team
1	R1	(Italy) Autodromo Enzo e Dino Ferrari, Imola	30 April	(Italy) Alessandro Balzan	(Italy) Alex Frassineti	(Italy) Alessandro Balzan	(Italy) Ebimotors
1	R2	(Italy) Autodromo Enzo e Dino Ferrari, Imola	1 May		(Italy) Vito Postiglione	(Italy) Vito Postiglione	(Italy) Petricorse Motorsport
2	R1	(Italy) Autodromo di Franciacorta, Castrezzato	15 May	(Italy) Vito Postiglione	(Italy) Alex Frassineti	(Italy) Alessandro Balzan	(Italy) Ebimotors
2	R2	(Italy) Autodromo di Franciacorta, Castrezzato	15 May		(Italy) Marco Mapelli	(Italy) Marco Mapelli	(Italy) Ebimotors
3	R1	(Italy) Misano World Circuit, Misano Adriatico	4 June	(Italy) Alessandro Balzan	(Italy) Alessandro Balzan	(Italy) Alessandro Balzan	(Italy) Ebimotors
3	R2	(Italy) Misano World Circuit, Misano Adriatico	5 June		(Italy) Marco Mapelli	(Italy) Marco Mapelli	(Italy) Ebimotors
4	R1	(Germany) Nürburgring, Nürburg	25 June	(Italy) Alex Frassineti	(Italy) Alessandro Balzan	(Italy) Alessandro Balzan	(Italy) Ebimotors
5	R1	(Italy) Autodromo Internazionale del Mugello, Scarperia	31 July	(Italy) Alessandro Balzan	(Italy) Alessandro Balzan	(Italy) Alessandro Balzan	(Italy) Ebimotors
5	R2	(Italy) Autodromo Internazionale del Mugello, Scarperia	31 July		(Italy) Alessandro Balzan	(Italy) Massimo Monti	(Italy) Antonelli Motorsport
6	R1	(Italy) ACI Vallelunga Circuit, Campagnano	17 September	(Italy) Marco Mapelli	(Italy) Alessandro Balzan	(Italy) Alessandro Balzan	(Italy) Ebimotors
6	R2	(Italy) ACI Vallelunga Circuit, Campagnano	18 September		(Italy) Alessandro Balzan	(Italy) Alex Frassineti	(Italy) Petricorse Motorsport
7	R1	(Italy) Autodromo Nazionale Monza, Monza	15 October	(Italy) Alessandro Balzan	(Italy) Alessandro Balzan	(Italy) Alessandro Balzan	(Italy) Ebimotors
7	R2	(Italy) Autodromo Nazionale Monza, Monza	16 October		(Italy) Alessandro Balzan	(Italy) Alessandro Balzan	(Italy) Ebimotors

== Championship standings ==
Points system
	**1st**	**2nd**	**3rd**	**4th**	**5th**	**6th**	**7th**	**8th**	**9th**	**10th**	**Pole**	FL
Race 1	20	15	12	10	8	6	4	3	2	1	2	1
Race 2	15	10	8	6	4	3	2	1				1

=== Drivers' Championship ===
Pos	Driver	IMO (Italy)		FRA (Italy)		MIS (Italy)		NÜR^{1} (Germany)	MUG (Italy)		VAL (Italy)		MNZ (Italy)		Pts
1	(Italy) Alessandro Balzan	**1**	2	1	5	**1**	2	1	**1**	10	1	5	**1**	1	197
2	(Italy) Marco Mapelli	5	DNS	6	**1**	6	**1**	2	8	3	2	4	4	2	126
3	(Italy) Massimo Monti	8	3	3	10	2	6	3	4	1	7	6	2	5	112
4	(Italy) Vito Postiglione	2	1	**11**	7	3	7	4	2	4	4	3	9	8	111
5	(Italy) Massimiliano Busnelli	4	Ret	Ret	8	4	4	8	3	12	6	**2**	3	3	95
6	(Italy) Alex Frassineti	3	Ret	2	6	5	8	**Ret**	Ret	Ret	5	1	7	Ret	87
7	(Italy) Alessandro Bonacini	Ret	7	5	2	8	16	7	5	2	8	7	5	4	80
8	(Italy) Stefano Comandini	6	**4**	4	3	7	10	Ret	Ret	6	10	18†	6	**6**	67
9	(Italy) Enrico Fulgenzi	Ret	9	13	9	10	3	5	Ret	Ret	3	Ret	8	9	45
10	(Italy) Gianluca Giraudi	11	5	7	4	9	5		15	5	18	12	11	7	27
11	(Italy) Alberto de Amicis	14	15	14	12	15	14	Ret	7	7	15	13	12	13	26
12	(Italy) Angelo Proietti	10	8	8	11	16	13	Ret	16	Ret	11	11	10	11	26
13	(Italy) Giorgio Piccioni	9	6	Ret	Ret	12	11	Ret	18†	13	12	10	Ret	12	25
14	(Ukraine) Oleksandr Gaidai	13	13	15	16	22	Ret	6	11	Ret	DSQ	15	17	19	20
15	(Italy) Stefano Costantini	7	19†	9	20†	11	9		Ret	9	9	8	14	10	9
16	(Italy) Stefano Maestri	Ret	12			13	18		6	**18**†	20	Ret			6
17	(Italy) Stefano Pezzucchi								9	8					3
18	(Germany) Günther Blieninger	15	16	16	19†	19	Ret		10	11	16	Ret	15	15	1
19	(Italy) Alberto Petrini	Ret	14	10	15	18	Ret		17†	Ret					1
	(Italy) Andrea Amici	12	10	Ret	14	14	12		Ret	14	13	9	20†	16	0
	(Italy) Massimo Giondi	16	11	Ret	Ret	Ret	17		Ret	17†	14	14	13	14	0
	(Italy) Raffaele Giannoni			12	13	17	15		12	16†					0
	(Italy) Marco Bonamico	Ret	17	17	17	21	19		13	15	17	17			0
	(Italy) Walter Ben	17	18	18	18	20	20		14	Ret	19	16	19	Ret	0
	(Italy) Omar Galbiati												16	17	0
	(Italy) Marco Cassarà												18	18	0
Pos	Driver	IMO (Italy)		FRA (Italy)		MIS (Italy)		NÜR^{1} (Germany)	MUG (Italy)		VAL (Italy)		MNZ (Italy)		Pts

Colour	Result
Gold	Winner
Silver	Second place
Bronze	Third place
Green	Points classification
Blue	Non-points classification
Blue	Non-classified finish (NC)
Purple	Retired, not classified (Ret)
Red	Did not qualify (DNQ)
Red	Did not pre-qualify (DNPQ)
Black	Disqualified (DSQ)
White	Did not start (DNS)
White	Withdrew (WD)
White	Race cancelled (C)
Blank	Did not practice (DNP)
Blank	Did not arrive (DNA)
Blank	Excluded (EX)

**Bold** – Pole
Italics – Fastest Lap

† — Drivers did not finish the race, but were classified as they completed over 75% of the race distance.

- **^1** - the Nürburgring round assigned 20 points to all the participants, regardless of the final result.

=== Teams' Championship ===
Pos	Team	IMO (Italy)		FRA (Italy)		MIS (Italy)		NÜR^{1} (Germany)	MUG (Italy)		VAL (Italy)		MNZ (Italy)		Pts
1	(Italy) Ebimotors	1	2	1	1	1	1	1	1	2	1	4	1	1	213
2	(Italy) Petricorse Motorsport	2	1	2	6	3	7	4	2	4	4	1	7	8	147
3	(Italy) Antonelli Motorsport	8	3	3	10	2	6	3	4	1	7	6	2	5	131
4	(Italy) Centro Porsche Padova	4	6	Ret	8	4	4	8	3	12	6	2	3	3	113
5	(Italy) AB Motorsport	6	4	4	3	7	9	Ret	Ret	6	9	8	6	6	96
6	(Italy) Erre Esse Motorsport	11	5	7	4	9	5	Ret	6	5	15	12	11	7	87
7	(Italy) Heaven Motorsport	Ret	9	10	9	10	3	5	17†	Ret	3	Ret	8	9	70
8	(Germany) Pole Team	15	16	16	19†	19	Ret		10	11	16	Ret	15	15	28
9	(Italy) Go Race	Ret	17	17	17	21	19		13	15	17	17	18	18	16
10	(Italy) GT Motorsport by Autotecnica Tadini	17	18	18	18	20	20		14	Ret	19	16	19	Ret	14
Pos	Team	IMO (Italy)		FRA (Italy)		MIS (Italy)		NÜR^{1} (Germany)	MUG (Italy)		VAL (Italy)		MNZ (Italy)		Pts

Colour	Result
Gold	Winner
Silver	Second place
Bronze	Third place
Green	Points classification
Blue	Non-points classification
Blue	Non-classified finish (NC)
Purple	Retired, not classified (Ret)
Red	Did not qualify (DNQ)
Red	Did not pre-qualify (DNPQ)
Black	Disqualified (DSQ)
White	Did not start (DNS)
White	Withdrew (WD)
White	Race cancelled (C)
Blank	Did not practice (DNP)
Blank	Did not arrive (DNA)
Blank	Excluded (EX)

**Bold** – Pole
Italics – Fastest Lap

† — Drivers did not finish the race, but were classified as they completed over 75% of the race distance.

- **^1** - the Nürburgring round assigned 20 points to all the participants, regardless of the final result.

=== Michelin Cup ===
The Michelin Cup is the trophy reserved to the gentlemen drivers.

Pos	Driver	Team	Points
1	(Italy) Angelo Proietti	Antonelli	87
2	(Italy) Giorgio Piccioni	Porsche Padova	75
3	(Italy) Alberto de Amicis	Erre Esse	65
4	(Italy) Massimo Giondi	Antonelli	22
5	(Italy) Stefano Maestri	Erre Esse	20
6	(Germany) Günther Blieninger	Pole	20
7	(Italy) Raffaele Giannoni	Erre Esse; Porsche Padova	16
8	(Italy) Alberto Petrini	Heaven	12
9	(Italy) Stefano Pezzucchi	Ebimotors	10
10	(Italy) Marco Bonamico	Go Race	9
11	(Italy) Omar Galbiati	Erre Esse	3
12	(Italy) Marco Cassarà	Go Race	1

=== Under-25 Trophy ===
The Under-25 Trophy is reserved to the under-25-year-old drivers.

Pos	Driver	Team	Points
1	(Italy) Marco Mapelli	Ebimotors	104
2	(Italy) Alex Frassineti	Petricorse	68
3	(Italy) Enrico Fulgenzi	Heaven	51
4	(Italy) Andrea Amici	Petricorse	33
