= Marco Mapelli =

Italian racing driver (born 1987)

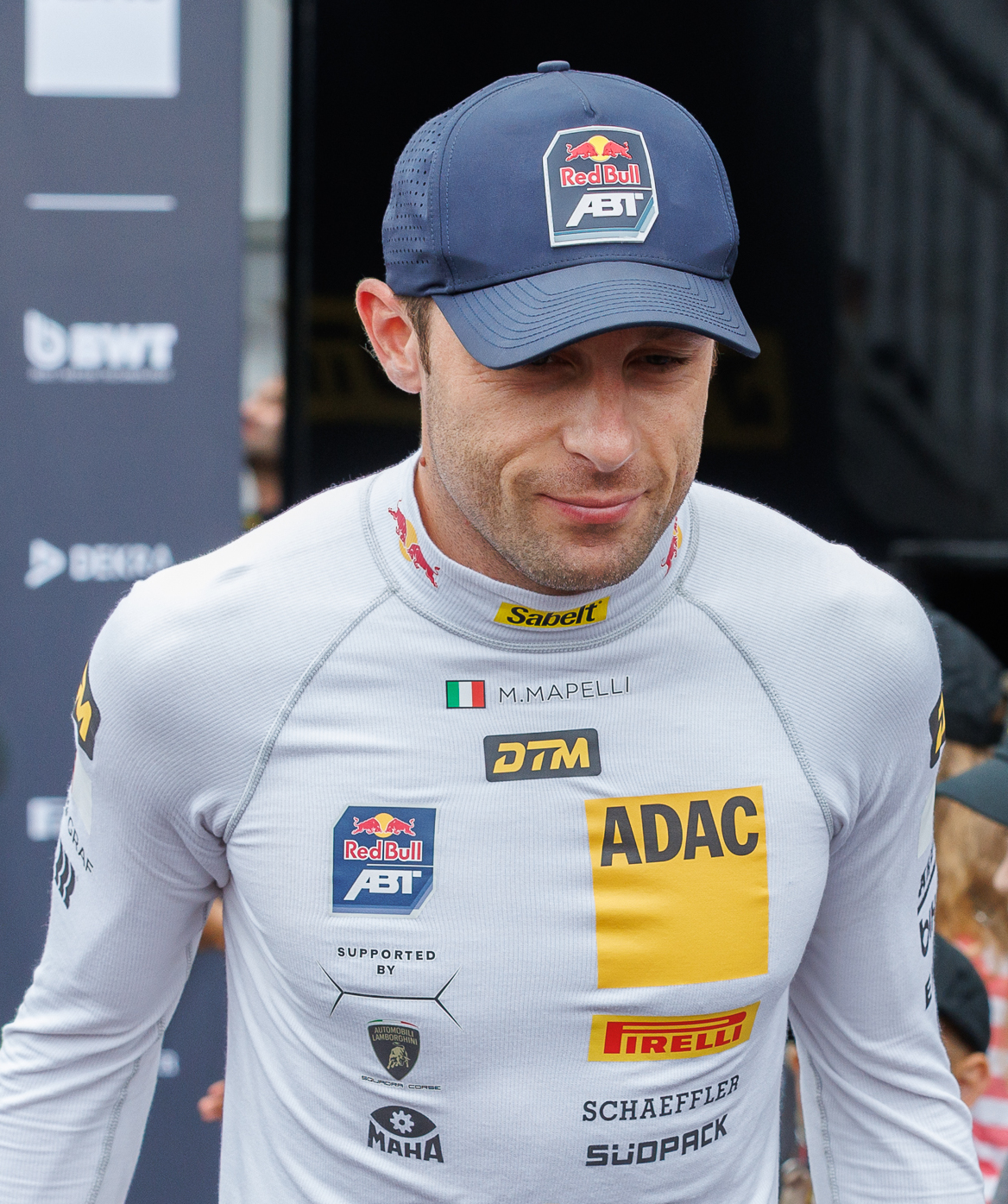
- Mapelli in 2026
- Nationality: (Italy) Italian
- Born: 1 August 1987 (age 39) Seregno, Italy

GT World Challenge career
- Debut season: 2010
- Current team: Lamborghini Squadra Corse
- Categorisation: FIA Silver (until 2016); FIA Gold (2017–2021); FIA Platinum (2022–)
- Car number: 63
- Fastest laps: Lamborghini Aventador SVJ: 6:44.97 Nürburgring Lap Record (2018)

Previous series
- 2013–14 2013–14 2012 2011 2010 2009 2008 2007 2006: Italian GT Championship; Italian GT Championship; International GTOpen; Porsche Carrera Cup Italia; Italian GT Champion; Italian Ferrari Challenge; Italian Ferrari Challenge; Australian Formula 3 Championship; Italian Formula Renault 2000 Championship

Marco Mapelli (born 1 August 1987 in Seregno, Italy) is an Italian racing driver. He is part of the Lamborghini factory stable, with whom he has won the overall 2019 Blancpain GT Series title.

After spending numerous years in Italian and Australian lower formulae, Mapelli made a gradual switch to the GT racing scene at the end of the 2000s, eventually taking part in and winning the Italian GT Sprint Championship's GTC class in 2010. Following a runner-up finish in the 2011 Porsche Carrera Cup Italia, Mapelli made a permanent move towards GT3 competition, spending two seasons in the International GT Open and four years in Italian GT, where he finished second in the standing on two occasions.

In 2017, Mapelli was added to the Lamborghini works driver lineup. Two irregular seasons followed, with the highlight being a race win in the ADAC GT Masters and multiple podiums in the 2018 Blancpain GT Series Asia, before Mapelli joined FFF Racing Team for the 2019 season. He and teammate Andrea Caldarelli experienced a successful campaign, winning both the GT World Challenge Europe and Blancpain GT Series Endurance Cup titles to be crowned Blancpain GT Series champions.

Since 2020, Mapelli has continued driving for Lamborghini-fielding teams in GT3 series, winning races in the GTWC Endurance Cup, ADAC GT Masters, and Asian Le Mans Series.

== Career ==
Statistics	
Race Entered	351
Wins	28
Podiums	91
Pole Positions	18
Race Win Percentage	8%

== Racing record ==
=== Career summary ===
Season	Series	Team	Races	Wins	Poles	F/Laps	Podiums	Points	Position
2005	Formula Renault 2.0 Italia	Alan Racing Team	2	0	0	0	0	0	36th
2006	Formula Renault 2.0 Italia	RP Motorsport	9	0	0	0	0	0	34th
2007	Australian Formula 3 Championship	Team BRM	14	1	0	4	3	114	5th
2007	International Formula Master	Bicar Racing	2	0	0	0	0	0	34th
2010	Superstars GTSprint Series	Vittoria Competizioni	4	0	0	0	1	16	19th
2010	Italian GT Championship - GT Cup	Vittoria Competizioni							**1st**
2011	Porsche Carrera Cup Italia	Ebimotors	12	2	2	2	6	126	**2nd**
2011	Porsche Supercup	Ebimotors	1	0	0	0	0	0	NC†
2011	24 Hours of Nürburgring - SP7	Dörr Motorsport	1	0	0	0	0	N/A	DNF
2012	International GT Open - GTS	Autorlando Sport							
2013	Italian GT Championship - GT3	Antonelli Motorsport	14	1	?	?	5	108	7th
2013	Blancpain Endurance Series - Pro	SMG Challenge	1	0	0	0	0	1	76th
2013	Blancpain Endurance Series - Pro	Prospeed Competition	1	0	0	0	0	1	76th
2013	24 Hours of Nürburgring - SP9	GDL Racing	1	0	0	0	0	N/A	19th
2014	Italian GT Championship - GT3	Audi Sport Italia	14	2	?	?	6	128	**3rd**
2015	Italian GT Championship - GT3	Audi Sport Italia	14	2	?	?	5	116	**2nd**
2015	FIA World Endurance Championship - LMGTE Am	Abu Dhabi-Proton Racing	1	0	0	0	1	18	18th
2015	European Le Mans Series - LMGTE	Proton Competition	2	0	0	0	1	30	11th
2016	Italian GT Championship - Super GT3	Audi Sport Italia	14	2	2	1	8	141	**2nd**
2016	Blancpain GT Series Endurance Cup - Pro-Am	Barwell Motorsport	5	0	0	0	1	20	15th
2016	Blancpain GT Series Sprint Cup	Attempto Racing	2	0	0	0	0	0	NC
2016	Blancpain GT Series Sprint Cup	GRT Grasser Racing Team	2	0	0	0	1	0	NC
2016	GT Asia Series	FFF Racing Team by ACM	2	1	0	0	1		
2017	IMSA SportsCar Championship - GTD	Konrad Motorsport	1	0	0	0	0	11	79th
2017	24H Series - A6	Konrad Motorsport	3						
2017	24 Hours of Nürburgring - SP9	Konrad Motorsport	1	0	0	0	0	N/A	DNF
2017	Blancpain GT Series Endurance Cup	Attempto Racing	2	0	0	0	0	0	NC
2017	Blancpain GT Series Sprint Cup	Attempto Racing	6	0	1	0	0	7	20th
2017	ADAC GT Masters	HB Racing WDS Bau	13	0	0	0	0	22	25th
2017	International GT Open	Imperiale Racing	6	1	0	0	3	56	9th
2018	Blancpain GT Series Endurance Cup	GRT Grasser Racing Team	4	0	0	0	0	8	39th
2018	ADAC GT Masters	GRT Grasser Racing Team	4	1	1	1	1	25	22nd
2018	Super GT Series - GT300	JLOC	7	0	2	1	0	28	13th
2018	Blancpain GT Series Asia - Pro-Am	FFF Racing Team by ACM	12	3	1	1	8	186	**1st**
2019	IMSA SportsCar Championship - GTD	Magnus Racing	1	0	0	0	0	21	53rd
2019	Blancpain GT Series Endurance Cup	Orange1 FFF Racing Team	5	1	0	0	3	74	**1st**
2019	GT World Challenge Europe	Orange1 FFF Racing Team	10	2	0	2	6	92.5	**1st**
2019	ADAC GT Masters	Orange1 by GRT Grasser	12	0	0	0	1	60	18th
2019	24 Hours of Nürburgring - SP9	Konrad Motorsport	1	0	0	0	0	N/A	DNF
2020	IMSA SportsCar Championship - GTD	GRT Magnus	1	0	0	0	1	32	40th
2020	GT World Challenge Europe Endurance Cup	Orange1 FFF Racing Team	4	0	0	0	1	37	9th
2020	British GT Championship	WPI Motorsport	1	0	0	0	0	1.5	19th
2020	24 Hours of Nürburgring - SP9	Konrad Motorsport	1	0	0	0	0	N/A	DNF
2021	IMSA SportsCar Championship - GTD	GRT Grasser Racing Team	2	0	0	0	1	160	74th
2021	ADAC GT Masters	GRT Grasser Racing Team	6	1	1	0	1	51	19th
2021	ADAC GT Masters	T3 Motorsport	2	0	0	0	0	51	19th
2021	GT World Challenge Europe Endurance Cup	Orange1 FFF Racing Team	5	1	4	0	2	73	4th
2021	24 Hours of Nürburgring - SP9	Hankook FFF Racing Team	1	0	0	0	0	N/A	DNF
2022	IMSA SportsCar Championship - GTD Pro	TR3 Racing	2	0	1	0	1	577	17th
2022	GT World Challenge Europe Endurance Cup	Orange 1 K-PAX Racing	1	0	0	0	0	0	NC
2022	ADAC GT Masters	T3 Motorsport	6	0	0	0	0	106	11th
2022	ADAC GT Masters	Paul Motorsport	8	0	0	0	4	106	11th
2022	GT World Challenge America - Pro	K-PAX Racing	1	0	0	0	0	0	NC†
2023	Asian Le Mans Series - GT	Leipert Motorsport	4	0	1	0	2	31	5th
2023	IMSA SportsCar Championship - GTD	Forte Racing powered by US RaceTronics	1	0	0	0	0	257	54th
2023	GT World Challenge Europe Endurance Cup	K-PAX Racing	5	0	0	0	0	2	26th
2023	GT World Challenge Europe Sprint Cup	VSR	4	0	0	0	0	9.5	14th
2023	ADAC GT Masters	GRT Grasser Racing Team	12	2	4	0	3	157	4th
2023	24 Hours of Nürburgring - SP9	ABT Sportsline	1	0	0	0	0	N/A	9th
2023-24	Asian Le Mans Series - GT	Leipert Motorsport	5	0	0	0	1	34	7th
2024	GT World Challenge Europe Endurance Cup	GRT Grasser Racing Team	5	1	1	2	2	63	**2nd**
2024	GT World Challenge Asia - Pro-Am	VSR	6	0	0	0	1	38	22nd
2024	24 Hours of Nürburgring - SP9	Red Bull Team ABT	1	0	0	0	0	N/A	5th
2025	IMSA SportsCar Championship - GTD Pro	Pfaff Motorsports	9	0	0	0	1	2325	11th
2025	GT World Challenge Europe Endurance Cup	VSR	3	0	0	0	0	7	22nd
2025	24 Hours of Nürburgring - SP9	ABT Sportsline	1	0	0	0	0	N/A	5th
2026	Deutsche Tourenwagen Masters	Red Bull Team Abt	16	0	0	0	1	57	17th
2026	Nürburgring Langstrecken-Serie - SP9	Team ABT Sportsline							
2026	24 Hours of Nürburgring - SP9	Schaeffler Team Abt	1	0	0	0	0	N/A	DNF
2026	GT World Challenge Europe Endurance Cup	Rutronik Racing	5	0	0	0	0	6	29th

† As Mapelli was a guest driver, he was ineligible for points.

=== Complete 24 Hours of Nürburgring results ===
Year	Team	Co-Drivers	Car	Class	Laps	Pos.	Class Pos.
2011	(Germany) Dörr Motorsport	(Germany) Christian Gebhardt (Germany) Markus Grossmann (Germany) Timo Kluck	Porsche 997 Cup	SP7	96	DNF	DNF
2013	(Italy) GDL Racing	(Italy) Roberto Feccio (Italy) Dario Paletto (Australia) Paul Stubber	Porsche 997 GT3 Cup S	SP9	?	29th	19th
2017	(Austria) Konrad Motorsport	(Germany) Christian Engelhart (Germany) Dominik Farnbacher (Germany) Hendrik Still	Lamborghini Huracán GT3	SP9	17	DNF	DNF
2019	(Austria) Konrad Motorsport	(United Kingdom) Michael Lyons (Zimbabwe) Axcil Jefferies (Italy) Michele Di Martino	Lamborghini Huracán GT3 Evo	SP9	126	DNF	DNF
2020	(Austria) Konrad Motorsport	(Zimbabwe) Axcil Jefferies (Italy) Michele Di Martino (France) Franck Perera	Lamborghini Huracán GT3 Evo	SP9 Pro	15	DNF	DNF
2021	(Italy) Hankook FFF Racing Team	(Italy) Giacomo Altoè (Italy) Mirko Bortolotti (France) Franck Perera	Lamborghini Huracán GT3 Evo	SP9 Pro	31	DNF	DNF
2023	(Germany) Abt Sportsline	(South Africa) Kelvin van der Linde (South Africa) Jordan Pepper (Denmark) Nicki Thiim	Lamborghini Huracán GT3 Evo 2	SP9 Pro	160	9th	7th
2024	(Germany) Red Bull Team Abt	(South Africa) Kelvin van der Linde (South Africa) Jordan Pepper	Lamborghini Huracán GT3 Evo 2	SP9 Pro	50	5th	5th
2025	(Germany) Abt Sportsline	(Germany) Christian Engelhart (Germany) Luca Engstler	Lamborghini Huracán GT3 Evo 2	SP9 Pro	140	5th	4th
2026	(Germany) Schaeffler Team Abt	(Netherlands) Nicky Catsburg (United Kingdom) Nick Yelloly	Lamborghini Huracán GT3 Evo 2	SP9 Pro	128	DNF	DNF

=== Complete Bathurst 12 Hour results ===
Year	Team	Co-Drivers	Car	Class	Laps	Pos.	Class Pos.
2015	(Germany) Phoenix Racing	(Belgium) Laurens Vanthoor (Germany) Markus Winkelhock	Audi R8 LMS ultra	AP	269	**2nd**	**1st**
2016	(Australia) Jamec Pem Racing	(Germany) Christopher Haase (Germany) Christopher Mies	Audi R8 LMS	AP	50	DNF	DNF
2020	(China) FFF Racing Team	(Italy) Andrea Caldarelli (Denmark) Dennis Lind	Lamborghini Huracán GT3 Evo	Pro	187	DNF	DNF
2026	(Australia) Wall Racing	(Australia) Tony D'Alberto (Australia) Adrian Deitz (Australia) Grant Denyer	Lamborghini Huracán GT3 Evo 2	Bronze	260	15th	5th

=== Complete FIA World Endurance Championship results ===
(Races in bold indicate pole position) (Races in italics indicate fastest lap)

Year	Entrant	Class	Car	Engine	1	2	3	4	5	6	7	8	Pos.	Points
2015	Abu Dhabi-Proton Racing	LMGTE Am	Porsche 911 RSR	Porsche 4.0 L Flat-6	SIL	SPA	LMS	NÜR	COA	FUJ	SHA	BHR; 2	18th	18

=== Complete European Le Mans Series results ===
(Races in bold indicate pole position) (Races in italics indicate fastest lap)

Year	Entrant	Class	Chassis	Engine	1	2	3	4	5	Pos.	Points
2015	Proton Competition	LMGTE	Porsche 911 RSR	Porsche 4.0 L Flat-6	SIL	IMO; 2	RBR	LEC; 4	EST	11th	30

=== Complete GT World Challenge Europe results ===
==== GT World Challenge Europe Endurance Cup ====
(Races in bold indicate pole position) (Races in italics indicate fastest lap)

Year	Team	Car	Class	1	2	3	4	5	6	7	Pos.	Points
2013	SMG Challenge	Porsche 997 GT3-R	Pro	MNZ; 16	SIL	LEC					76th	1
2013	Prospeed Competition	Porsche 997 GT3-R	Pro				SPA; 6H; 33	SPA; 12H; 41	SPA; 24H; Ret	NÜR	76th	1
2016	Barwell Motorsport	Lamborghini Huracán GT3	Pro-Am	MNZ; 42	SIL; Ret	LEC; 12	SPA; 6H; 36	SPA; 12H; 32	SPA; 24H; 25	NÜR; 24	15th	29
2017	Attempto Racing	Lamborghini Huracán GT3	Pro	MNZ; DNS	SIL; 19	LEC; Ret	SPA; 6H	SPA; 12H	SPA; 24H	CAT	NC	0
2018	GRT Grasser Racing Team	Lamborghini Huracán GT3	Pro	MNZ; Ret	SIL	LEC; 17	SPA; 6H; 19	SPA; 12H; 19	SPA; 24H; 14	CAT; 6	39th	8
2019	Orange 1 FFF Racing Team	Lamborghini Huracán GT3 Evo	Pro	MNZ; 2	SIL; 6	LEC; 3	SPA; 6H; 33	SPA; 12H; 21	SPA; 24H; 8	CAT; 1	1st	74
2020	Orange 1 FFF Racing Team	Lamborghini Huracán GT3 Evo	Pro	IMO; Ret	NÜR; 16	SPA; 6H; 2	SPA; 12H; 2	SPA; 24H; 38	LEC; 3		9th	37
2021	Orange 1 FFF Racing Team	Lamborghini Huracán GT3 Evo	Pro	**MNZ**; 24	**LEC**; 3	SPA; 6H; 2	SPA; 12H; 10	SPA; 24H; 8	**NÜR**; 1	**CAT**; 4	4th	73
2022	Orange 1 K-PAX Racing	Lamborghini Huracán GT3 Evo	Pro	IMO	LEC	SPA; 6H; 31	SPA; 12H; 22	SPA; 24H; 11	HOC	CAT	NC	0
2023	K-Pax Racing	Lamborghini Huracán GT3 Evo 2	Pro	MNZ; Ret	LEC; 11	SPA; 6H; 17	SPA; 12H; 11	SPA; 24H; 29	NÜR; 9	CAT; 44	26th	2
2024	GRT Grasser Racing Team	Lamborghini Huracán GT3 Evo 2	Pro	LEC; 11	SPA; 6H; 17	SPA; 12H; 8	**SPA**; **24H**; 5	NÜR; 1	MNZ; 10	JED; 2	2nd	63
2025	VSR	Lamborghini Huracán GT3 Evo 2	Pro	LEC; 14	MNZ	SPA; 6H; 3	SPA; 12H; 46	SPA; 24H; Ret	NÜR; 15	CAT	22nd	7
2026	Rutronik Racing	Lamborghini Temerario GT3	Pro	LEC; Ret	MNZ; 7	SPA; 6H; 18	SPA; 12H; 18	SPA; 24H; 19	NÜR; 19	ALG; 50	29th	6

==== GT World Challenge Europe Sprint Cup ====
(Races in bold indicate pole position) (Races in italics indicate fastest lap)

Year	Team	Car	Class	1	2	3	4	5	6	7	8	9	10	Pos.	Points
2016	Attempto Racing	Lamborghini Huracán GT3	Pro	MIS; QR	MIS; CR	BRH; QR; 28	BRH; CR; 28	NÜR; QR	NÜR; CR					NC	0
2016	GRT Grasser Racing Team	Lamborghini Huracán GT3	Pro							HUN; QR; 13	HUN; CR; Ret	CAT; QR	CAT; CR	NC	0
2017	Attempto Racing	Lamborghini Huracán GT3	Pro	**MIS**; **QR**; 23	MIS; CR; 27	BRH; QR; 9	BRH; CR; 13	ZOL; QR; 9	ZOL; CR; 7	HUN; QR	HUN; CR	NÜR; QR	NÜR; CR	20th	7
2019	Orange1 FFF Racing Team	Lamborghini Huracán GT3 Evo	Pro	BRH; 1 Ret	BRH; 2; 2	MIS; 1; 1	MIS; 2; 2	ZAN; 1; 3	ZAN; 2; 7	NÜR; 1; 1	NÜR; 2; 3	HUN; 1; 5	HUN; 2; 4	1st	92.5
2023	VSR	Lamborghini Huracán GT3 Evo 2	Pro	BRH; 1	BRH; 2	MIS; 1	MIS; 2	HOC; 1	HOC; 2	VAL; 1; 15	VAL; 2; 12	ZAN; 1; 8	ZAN; 2; 4	14th	9.5

=== Complete ADAC GT Masters Results ===
(Races in bold indicate pole position) (Races in italics indicate fastest lap)

Year	Team	Car	1	2	3	4	5	6	7	8	9	10	11	12	13	14	Pos.	Points
2017	HB Racing WDS Bau	Lamborghini Huracán GT3	OSC; 1; 14	OSC; 2; 4	LAU; 1; 12	LAU; 2; 15	RBR; 1 Ret	RBR; 2; 14	ZAN; 1; 23	ZAN; 2; 20	NÜR; 1; 14	NÜR; 2 Ret	SAC; 1; 15	SAC; 2; 5	HOC; 1 Ret	HOC; 2 DNS	25th	22
2018	GRT Grasser Racing Team	Lamborghini Huracán GT3	OSC; 1	OSC; 2	MST; 1	MST; 2	RBR; 1	RBR; 2	NÜR; 1	NÜR; 2	**ZAN**; **1**; 1	ZAN; 2 Ret	SAC; 1; 14	SAC; 2 Ret	HOC; 1	HOC; 2	22nd	25
2019	Orange1 by GRT Grasser	Lamborghini Huracán GT3 Evo	OSC; 1; 15	OSC; 2; 5	MST; 1; 18	MST; 2; 11	RBR; 1; 21	RBR; 2; 12	ZAN; 1; 3	ZAN; 2; 7	NÜR; 1; 22	NÜR; 2; 6	HOC; 1; 14	HOC; 2; 22	SAC; 1	SAC; 2	18th	60
2021	GRT Grasser Racing Team	Lamborghini Huracán GT3 Evo	OSC; 1	OSC; 2	RBR; 1	RBR; 2	ZAN; 1 Ret	ZAN; 2; 19	LAU; 1	LAU; 2			**HOC**; **1**; 1	HOC; 2; 19	NÜR; 1 Ret	NÜR; 2; 4	19th	51
2021	T3 Motorsport	Lamborghini Huracán GT3 Evo									SAC; 1; 8	SAC; 2; 15					19th	51
2022	T3 Motorsport	Lamborghini Huracán GT3 Evo	OSC; 1; 11	OSC; 2; 18	RBR; 1; 8	RBR; 2; 15	ZAN; 1; 7	ZAN; 2; 20†									11th	106
2022	Paul Motorsport	Lamborghini Huracán GT3 Evo							NÜR; 1 Ret	NÜR; 2; 10	LAU; 1; 3^{3}	LAU; 2; 5	SAC; 1; 19†	SAC; 2; 3	HOC; 1; 3	HOC; 2; 3	11th	106
2023	GRT Grasser Racing Team	Lamborghini Huracán GT3 Evo 2	**HOC**; **1**; 8^{1}	HOC; 2; 7	NOR; 1; 5^{3}	NOR; 2; 6	NÜR; 1; 6	**NÜR**; **2**; 1^{1}	SAC; 1; 7^{2}†	**SAC**; **2**; 2^{1}	**RBR**; **1** DSQ^{1}	RBR; 2; 8^{2}	**HOC**; **1**; 1^{1}	HOC; 2 Ret^{2}			4th	157

=== Complete IMSA SportsCar Championship results ===
(key) (Races in bold indicate pole position; results in italics indicate fastest lap)

Year	Team	Class	Make	Engine	1	2	3	4	5	6	7	8	9	10	11	12	Pos.	Points
2017	Konrad Motorsport	GTD	Lamborghini Huracán GT3	Lamborghini 5.2 L V10	DAY; 20	SEB	LBH	AUS	BEL	WGL	MOS	LIM	ELK	VIR	LGA	PET	79th	11
2019	Magnus Racing	GTD	Lamborghini Huracán GT3 Evo	Lamborghini 5.2 L V10	DAY; 10	SEB	MDO	DET	WGL	MOS	LIM	ELK	VIR	LGA	PET		53rd	21
2020	GRT Magnus	GTD	Lamborghini Huracán GT3 Evo	Lamborghini 5.2 L V10	DAY; 2	DAY	SEB	ELK	VIR	ATL	MDO	CLT	PET	LGA	SEB		40th	32
2021	GRT Grasser Racing Team	GTD	Lamborghini Huracán GT3 Evo	Lamborghini 5.2 L V10	DAY; 18	SEB	MDO	DET; 2‡	WGL	WGL	LIM	ELK	LGA	LBH	VIR	PET	74th	160
2022	TR3 Racing	GTD Pro	Lamborghini Huracán GT3 Evo	Lamborghini 5.2 L V10	**DAY**; 12	SEB; 2	LBH	LGA	WGL	MOS	LIM	ELK	VIR	PET			17th	577
2023	Forte Racing powered by US RaceTronics	GTD	Lamborghini Huracán GT3 Evo 2	Lamborghini 5.2 L V10	DAY; 7	SEB	LBH	MON	WGL	MOS	LIM	ELK	VIR	IMS	PET		54th	257
2025	Pfaff Motorsports	GTD Pro	Lamborghini Huracán GT3 Evo 2	Lamborghini 5.2 L V10	DAY; 13	SEB; 10	LGA; 4	DET; 3	WGL	MOS; 5	ELK; 6	VIR; 9	IMS; 9	PET; 10			11th	2325

^{‡} Points count towards WeatherTech Sprint Cup championship only.

=== Complete Super GT results ===
(key) (Races in bold indicate pole position) (Races in italics indicate fastest lap)

Year	Team	Car	Class	1	2	3	4	5	6	7	8	Pos.	Points
2018	JLOC	Lamborghini Huracán GT3	GT300	**OKA**; 7	FUJ; 9	SUZ; 4	CHA	FUJ; 6	SUG; 5	AUT; 13	**MOT**; 27	13th	28

=== Complete Deutsche Tourenwagen Masters results ===
(key) (Races in bold indicate pole position) (Races in italics indicate fastest lap)

Year	Entrant	Chassis	1	2	3	4	5	6	7	8	9	10	11	12	13	14	15	16	Rank	Points
2026	Red Bull Team Abt	Lamborghini Temerario GT3	RBR; 1; 17	RBR; 2; 19	ZAN; 1; 15	ZAN; 2; 7	LAU; 1; 2	LAU; 2; 15	NOR; 1; 16	NOR; 2 Ret	OSC; 1 Ret	OSC; 2; 13	NÜR; 1 Ret	NÜR; 2; 9	SAC; 1 Ret	SAC; 2; 14	HOC; 1; 9	HOC; 2; 9	17th	57

Sporting positions
Preceded by Raffaele Marciello; Michael Meadows (GT Series Sprint Cup)	Blancpain GT World Challenge Europe; Champion; 2019; With: Andrea Caldarelli	Succeeded by Dries Vanthoor; Charles Weerts (GT World Challenge Europe Sprint Cup)
Preceded by Yelmer Buurman; Maro Engel; Luca Stolz	Blancpain GT Series Endurance Cup; Champion; 2019; With: Andrea Caldarelli	Succeeded by Alessandro Pier Guidi (GT World Challenge Europe Endurance Cup)
Preceded by Raffaele Marciello	Blancpain GT Series; Champion; 2019; With: Andrea Caldarelli	Succeeded by Timur Boguslavskiy (GT World Challenge Europe)
