= Alessandro Pier Guidi =

Italian racing driver (born 1983)

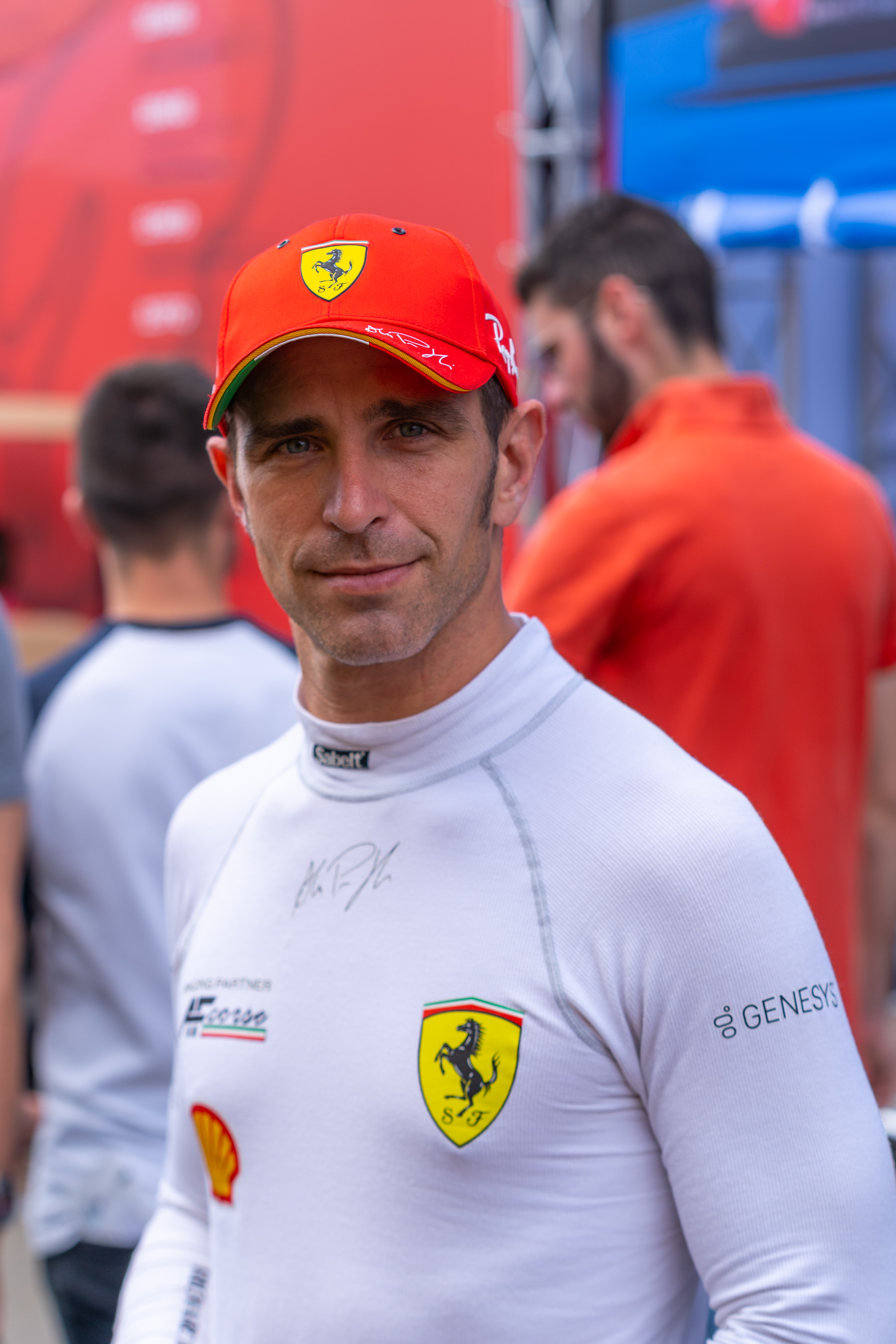
- Pier Guidi in 2023
- Nationality: (Italy) Italian
- Born: 18 December 1983 (age 42) Tortona (Italy)
- Categorisation: FIA Gold (until 2013, 2015–2017); FIA Platinum (2014, 2018–)
- Wins: 24 Hours of Le Mans 2023 (Overall Winner); 24 Hours of Le Mans 2019, 2021 GTE Pro Class Winner; FIA World Endurance Championship GTE Pro Class Champions 2017, 2021-22; GT World Endurance Champions 2017; GT World Challenge 2020 Champions with AF Corse; Petit Le Mans 2019 GTLM Class Winner with Risi Competizione; Rolex 24 Hours of Daytona 2014 GTD Class Winner with Level 5 Motorsports (Ferrari 458GTD Italia)

Previous series
- 2009 2008 2008 2006-2007 2007 2007 2006 2006 2006 2006 2006 2005 2005: FIA GT Championship; Superleague Formula; FIA GT Championship; A1 Grand Prix; FIA GT Championship; International GT Open; F3000 International Masters; FIA GT Championship; International GT Open; Italian GT Championship; Spanish GT Championship; Italian GT Championship; Spanish GT Championship

Championship titles
- 2021 2017 2017: Intercontinental GT Challenge; Italian GT Championship GT2; FIA World Endurance Championship

Alessandro Pier Guidi (born 18 December 1983) is a racing driver from Italy. A Ferrari factory driver since 2017, he won the FIA World Endurance Championship for LMGTE Pro in 2017, 2021 and 2022, the 24 Hours of Le Mans in the LMGTE Pro class in 2019 and 2021, and claimed the 24 Hours of Spa in 2021. Later moving to Hypercar, Pier Guidi took an overall win at the Centenary 24 Hours of Le Mans in 2023 along with James Calado and Antonio Giovinazzi, and clinched the FIA World Endurance Championship in 2025.

== Early career ==
Pier Guidi began racing karts in 1994, a discipline he remained in until 2001. During that time, he would win the Torneo delle Industrie multiple times and took home the Italian Junior Championship in 1997. In 2002, the Italian progressed to single-seaters, driving in the Italian Formula Renault series. After a two-year hiatus from racing, Pier Guidi moved over into GT racing in 2005. Success swiftly followed, as he won the Italian GT Championship in the GT2 class and finished third in the Spanish GT Championship, having missed two rounds.

The following season, Pier Guidi made a step back into the single-seater scene, competing in two rounds of the F3000 International Masters. As well as that, the Italian finished fourth in the International GT Open and once again took third overall in the Spanish series. At the end of 2006, Pier Guidi joined A1 Team Italy for the opening pair of that season's A1 Grand Prix events.

== GT career (2007–2013) ==
After a one-off appearance in 2006, the GT1 category in the FIA GT Championship became Pier Guidi's home for 2007. Driving for Scuderia Playteam Sarafree, the Italian would finish the season in ninth place.

In 2008, Pier Guidi would be signed by Galatasaray S.K., run by Scuderia Playteam, to race in the Superleague Formula series. The Italian scored three third-placed finishes and ended up eighth in the championship. He returned to the FIA GT Championship for the second half of the subsequent year where, driving for Vitaphone Racing alongside Matteo Bobbi, Pier Guidi won the season finale at Zolder and took home fifth in the standings, despite having missed the first three rounds. In 2010, Pier Guidi would once again miss a heap of races in the newly formed GT1 World Championship, though he ended up scoring a lone podium in the Navarra qualifying race. The Superstars Series became his next destination in 2011, where he finished ninth, grabbing three podiums in another incomplete campaign.

Despite 2012 being another patchy year in terms of series participation, Pier Guidi would experience a triumph at the 24 Hours of Spa, where he, Andrea Bertolini, Louis Machiels, and Niek Hommerson came out victorious in the Pro-Am class, driving a Ferrari 458 Italia GT3.

For the fifth year running, Pier Guidi did not race in any one series on a full-time basis in 2013. Nevertheless, he took a GTS class win alongside Aleksey Basov in the International GT Open and took a pole position in the Blancpain Endurance Series.

== GT career (2014–2016) ==
At the start of 2014, Pier Guidi achieved major sporting success as he scored a GTD class win in the 24 Hours of Daytona partnering Scott Tucker, Townsend Bell, Jeff Segal, and Bill Sweedler at Level 5 Motorsports, with a stewards call which originally stripped the win away from the team being reversed four hours after the finish.

Pier Guidi's main focus would lie in the Italian GT Championship that year, where he won at Mugello and scored three further podiums. At the end of the year, he took part in two races of the FIA World Endurance Championship, driving a Ferrari 458 Italia GT2 for AF Corse.

Going into 2015, Pier Guidi signed up for a full season in the European Le Mans Series with AF Corse-offshoot AT Racing. Competing in the GTE class alongside the father-son duo of Alexander Talkanitsa Senior and Junior, Pier Guidi took a win at Imola after battling his way past Marco Mapelli and Andrea Rizzoli and put the team fifth in the championship. That year, he also achieved his second Spa 24 Hours victory in the Pro-Am class, having teamed up with Gianmaria Bruni, Pasin Lathouras, and Stéphane Lémeret.

For the 2016 season, Pier Guidi returned to AT Racing for his sophomore season in the ELMS. Despite missing a round, the Italian had a successful campaign, scoring a pole position at Spa-Francorchamps and finishing on the podium thrice. In June, AF Corse included Pier Guidi in their LMGTE Pro effort in the 24 Hours of Le Mans, though the team would be forced to retire due to an engine failure.

== Ferrari factory driver (2017–present) ==
Ahead of the 2017 season, Pier Guidi signed a factory contract with Ferrari. It would soon be announced that he was replacing Gianmaria Bruni at AF Corse's LMGTE Pro outfit in the FIA World Endurance Championship, where he paired up with James Calado. The year unraveled in triumphant fashion, as seven podiums from nine races, including wins at the Nürburgring, Austin, and Fuji gave Pier Guidi and Calado their first world championship.

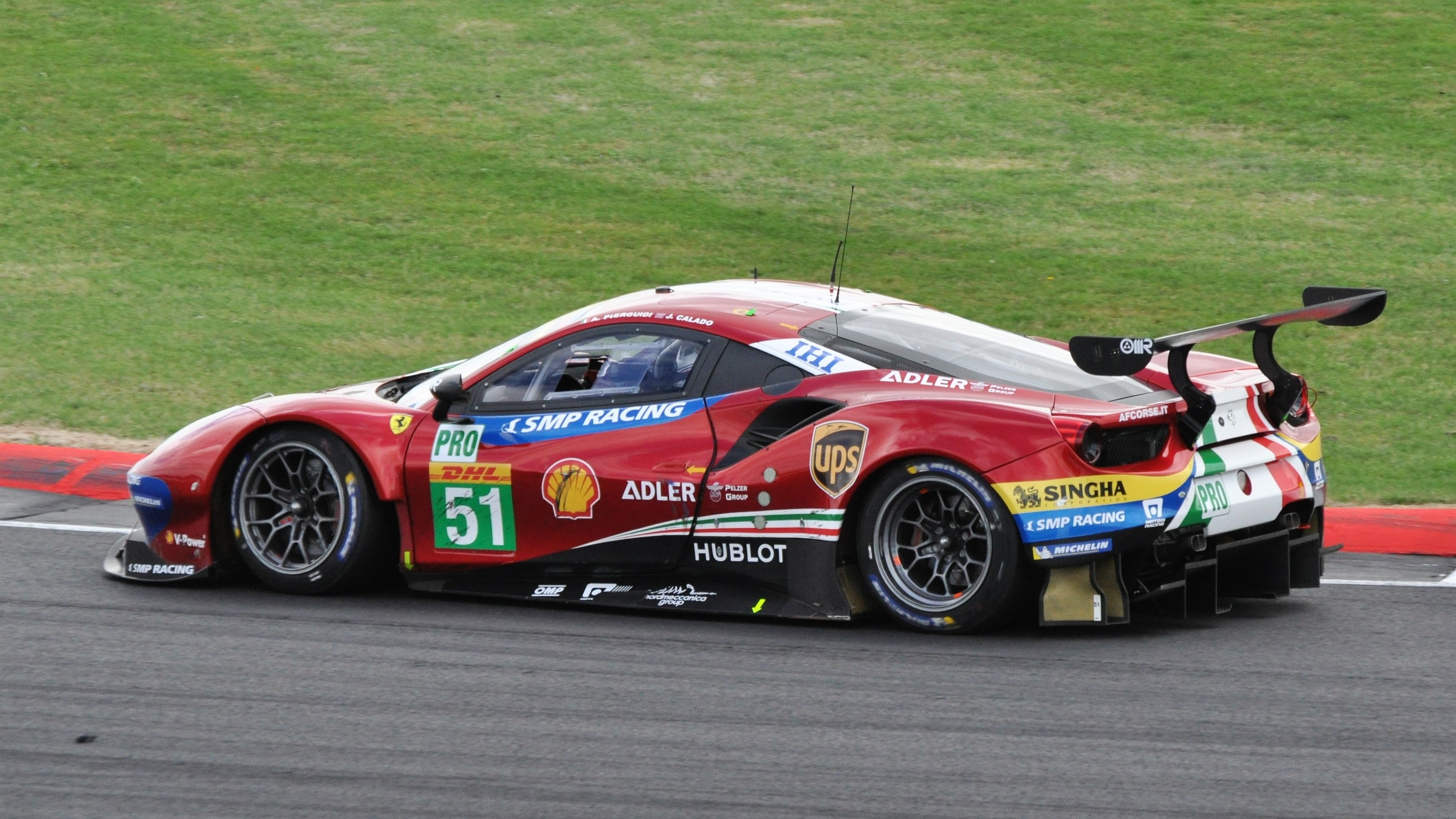
Pier Guidi driving the 488 GTE at the 2018 6 Hours of Silverstone

Pier Guidi and Calado returned with AF Corse for the 2018–19 WEC 'Super-Season'. They were unable to defend their title, though a class victory at the 2019 24 Hours of Le Mans and a win at Silverstone guaranteed the duo second in the standings. Another season without a championship followed in 2019–20, where a lone win at Shanghai resulted in fifth and sixth place for Calado and Pier Guidi - the Italian having missed the final race. The year did not pass without individual success for Pier Guidi however, as he won the GT World Challenge Europe Endurance Cup driving a Ferrari 488 GT3.

With Aston Martin exiting the WEC after 2020, leaving only two manufacturers in the GTE Pro class, 2021 proved to be a season-long battle between the #51 AF Corse Ferrari of Pier Guidi and Calado and the No. 92 Porsche of Kévin Estre and Neel Jani. Porsche drew first blood by utilising fuel strategy to win at Spa-Francorchamps, with Ferrari countering with a win in the Algarve. Despite voices in the Porsche camp suggesting that Ferrari would have the advantage going into the 6 Hours of Monza, Estre and Jani proved to be victorious, as a chasing Pier Guidi had to pit for fuel with a few laps to go. This disappointment would be turned into glory at Le Mans, where Pier Guidi, Calado, and Côme Ledogar won after dominating the latter half of the race. The final two races, both held at Bahrain, began with Porsche taking a dominant win at the 6 Hour event, moving a mere point behind Pier Guidi and Calado, a gap that turned into a dead heat once Porsche had scored pole for the 8 Hour round. During the finale, controversy reigned supreme, as Pier Guidi made contact with the class-leading No. 92 Porsche of Michael Christensen 12 minutes from the end of the race, who changed racing line while breaking after a failing attempt to block an LMP2 car, spinning around his title rival and inheriting first place. The stewards ordered Pier Guidi to return the place to Christensen, though as the Italian slowed on the main straight, the Porsche went into the pits to refuel the car. Pier Guidi, who pitted for fuel a lap later, came out ahead of Christensen and did not make another attempt to give back the position, and he was also not obliged to do so by the stewards, crossing the line in first and winning the championship. After Porsche protested the stewards' decision to let the win stand, an official appeal was swiftly withdrawn, thus confirming Pier Guidi and Calado as two-time champions.

During the year, the Italian also scored a personal achievement at the 24 Hours of Spa, winning the race for Iron Lynx with a late overtake on the leading Audi of Dries Vanthoor. This result helped Pier Guidi to retain the GTWC Europe Endurance Cup crown, one he shared with Nicklas Nielsen and Côme Ledogar.

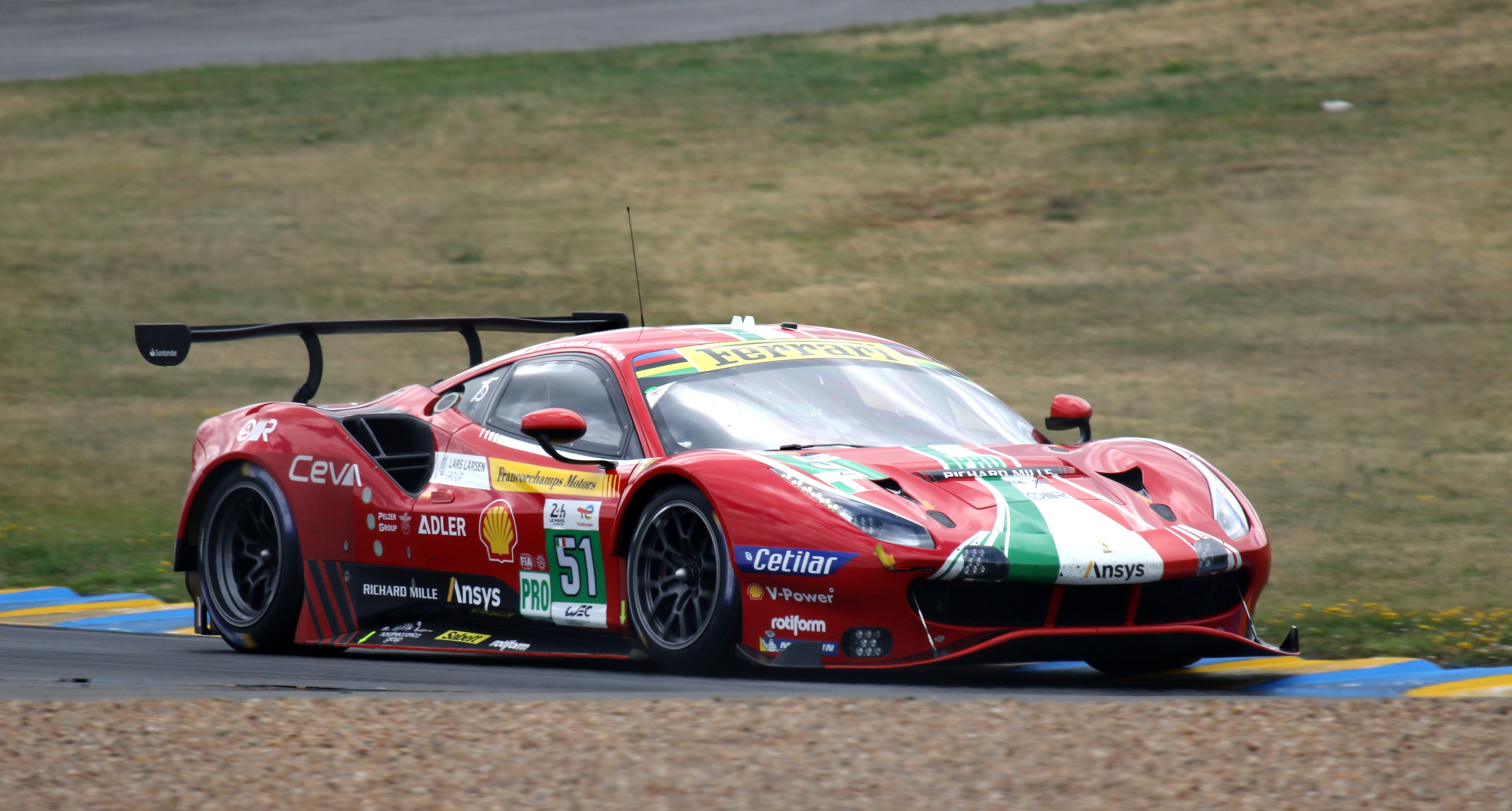
The No. 51 488 GTE EVO belonging to Pier Guidi, Calado, and Daniel Serra at the 2022 24 Hours of Le Mans

For 2022, Pier Guidi and Calado returned to defend their title in what would end up being the final year of the LMGTE Pro category in the WEC. Pier Guidi impressed throughout the year, scoring the marque's sole pole at Monza, putting in important stints at Spa in challenging weather conditions and winning the races in Belgium and Fuji, though his finest drive came at the final round in Bahrain. There, the car, which had initially looked likely to score a podium, developed a gearbox issue with two hours remaining which dropped them behind all other GTE Pro runners. Pier Guidi, using only fifth gear for the majority of his final stints, brought the car home ahead of the GTE Am cars, which were eligible for GTE points, in fifth, thereby winning the championship for a third time.

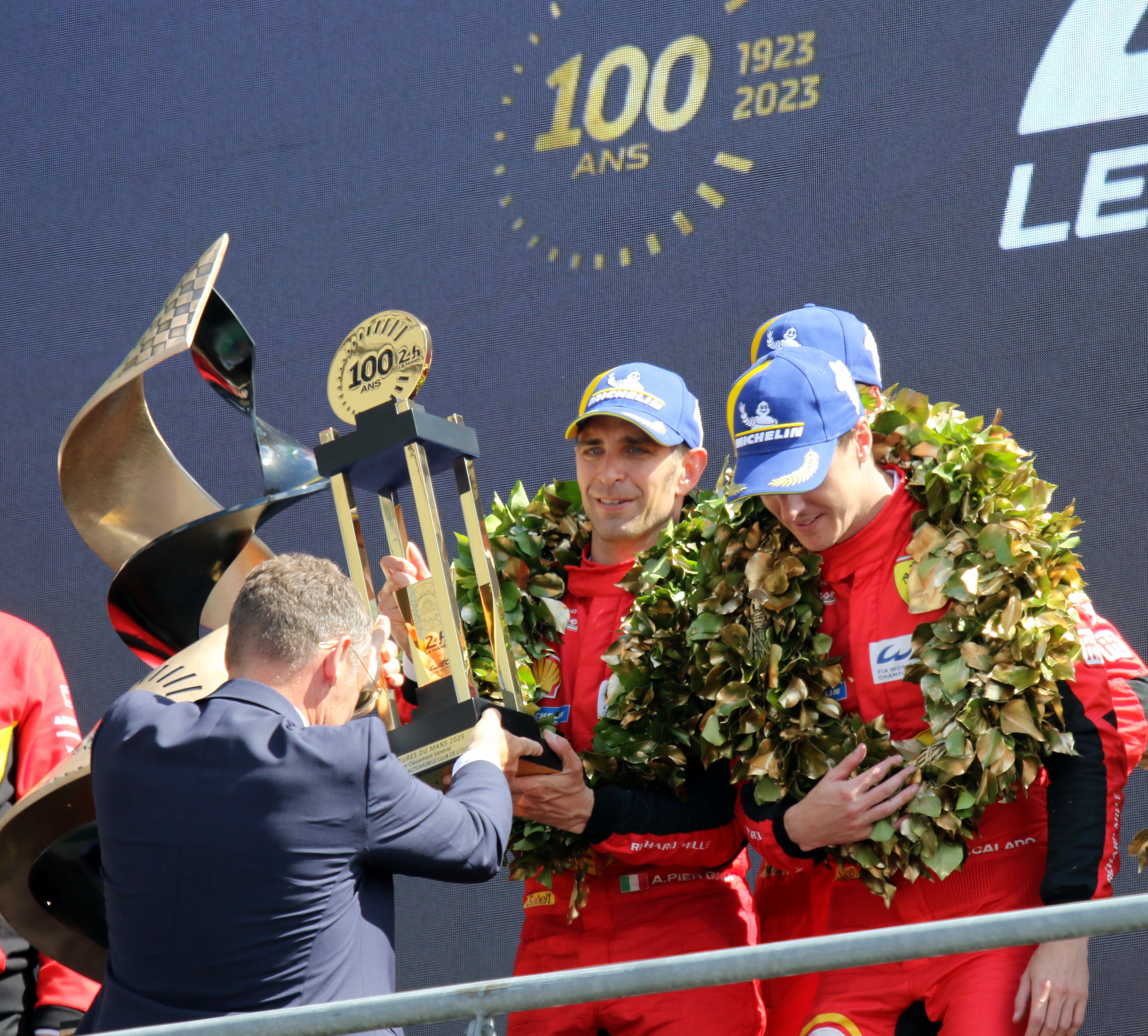
Pier Guidi and his No. 51 teammates on the top step of the podium after winning the 2023 24 Hours of Le Mans

Ferrari entered the Hypercar class for the 2023 WEC season, fielding two Ferrari 499P in an alliance with AF Corse. Pier Guidi would be placed in the No. 51 car, remaining alongside Calado and being joined by Antonio Giovinazzi. The opening round at Sebring proved to be a disappointment, as Pier Guidi collided with a GTE Am Ferrari and finished seventh, meanwhile a brake issue forced the Italian to nurse the car home in sixth at Portimão. At Spa, the trio achieved their first podium of the year, with Calado overtaking Porsche's Frédéric Makowiecki on the final lap to snatch third place. Le Mans became the season's magnum opus: After Ferrari locked out the front row with Pier Guidi starting behind poleman Antonio Fuoco, the No. 51 crew got into the lead by nightfall, though a spin into the gravel by Pier Guidi forced them to be recovered by a recovery vehicle, dropping them to fourth near midnight. The team remained undeterred and got back into the lead at the halfway mark, going on to control the race well into the morning. Despite a late challenge by Toyota, a spin caused them to fall back, leaving Pier Guidi to cross the line to win the centenary edition of the 24 Hours and bringing Ferrari their first overall Le Mans win in 50 years. This result turned out to be the final podium for the No. 51 trio, who finished fourth in the standings, one place behind their teammates in the No. 50.

== Racing record ==
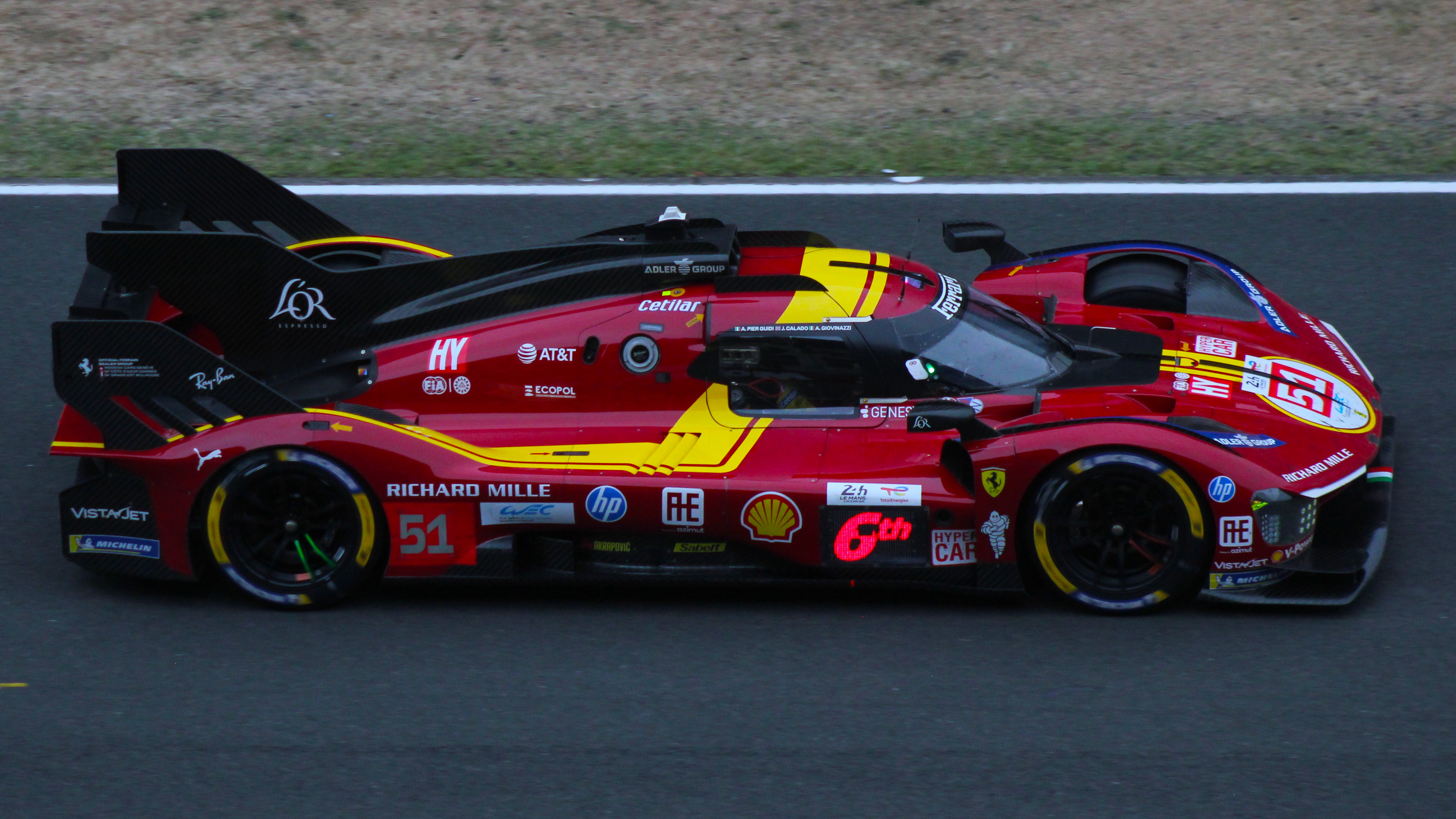
Pier Guidi's No. 51 car at the 2025 24 Hours of Le Mans

=== Career summary ===
Year	Series	Team	Races	Wins	Poles	F/Laps	Podiums	Points	Position
2002	Formula Renault 2.0 Italia	Birel Formula	10	0	0	0	0	14	18th
2005	Spanish GT Championship - GTA	Play Team Srl	7	4	3	4	5	65	**3rd**
2005	Italian GT Championship - GT2	Playteam Sara Free	16	8	8	5	10	210	**1st**
2006	Mil Milhas Brasileiras - GT2	Scuderia Playteam	1	1	1	1	1	N/A	**1st**
2006	International GT Open - GTA	Playteam SaraFree	7	2	3	5	6	68	4th
2006	Italian GT Championship - GT2	Playteam SaraFree	2	0	1	0	2	24	9th
2006	Spanish GT Championship - GTA	Playteam srl	9	4	4	5	4	53	**2nd**
2006	FIA GT Championship - GT1	Scuderia Playteam Sarafree	1	0	0	0	0	0	NC
2006	F3000 International Masters	ADM Motorsport	4	0	1	0	1	13	14th
2006–07	A1 Grand Prix	A1 Team Italy	4	0	0	0	0	52	7th
2007	International GT Open - GTA	Scuderia Playteam Sarafree	1	0	0	0	0	0	NC
2007	FIA GT Championship - GT1	Scuderia Playteam Sarafree	10	0	1	4	0	23	9th
2008	Superleague Formula	Galatasaray S.K.- Scuderia Playteam	12	0	1	0	3	277	8th
2008	FIA GT Championship - GT1	Vitaphone Racing Team	1	0	0	0	1	16	12th
2009	FIA GT Championship - GT1	Vitaphone Racing Team DHL	5	1	1	0	3	32	5th
2010	Trofeo Maserati Europe	Kessel Racing	3	2	2	0	2	32	9th
2010	FIA GT1 World Championship	Triple H Team Hegersport	8	0	0	0	1	8	38th
2010	FIA GT4 European Cup	Maserati Corse	2	2	2	2	2	20	8th
2011	International GT Open - SGT	Vittoria Competizioni	2	1	0	0	1	0	NC
2011	Superstars Italian Series	Swiss Team	8	0	0	1	3	49	9th
2011	Superstars International Series	Swiss Team	10	0	0	1	4	67	8th
2011	Trofeo Maserati Europe		4	3	3	0	4	0	NC
2012	International GT Open - GTS	Swiss Team	3	0	0	0	0	0	NC
2012	International GT Sprint Series - GTS3	Swiss Team	2	1	0	1	1	31	11th
2012	Trofeo Maserati		2	0	0	0	0	0	NC
2012	FIA GT3 European Championship	Esta Motorsports	2	0	0	0	1	27	12th
2012	Blancpain Endurance Series - Pro-Am Cup	Esta Motorsports	2	1	0	0	1	38	13th
2012	Copa de España de Super GT	Ray Racing Team	4	1	0	0	3	26	13th
2013	International GT Open - GTS	Estamotorsports	6	0	1	2	3	24	17th
2013	Blancpain Endurance Series - Pro-Am Cup	SMP Racing	1	0	1	0	0	24	19th
2013	Blancpain Endurance Series - Pro Cup	SMP Racing	2	0	1	1	0	25	13th
2013	Blancpain Endurance Series - Pro Cup	Esta Motorsport	1	0	0	0	0	25	13th
2013	Rolex Sports Car Series - GT	Scuderia Corsa	2	0	0	0	0	48	35th
2013	Gulf 12 Hours	Slamstop Motorsport	1	0	0	1	0	N/A	9th
2014	Italian GT Championship - GT3	BMS Scuderia Italia	8	1	2	0	4	66	16th
2014	FIA World Endurance Championship - LMGTE Am	AF Corse	2	0	0	0	0	1	37th
2014	Blancpain Endurance Series - Pro-Am Cup	AF Corse	1	0	1	1	0	0	NC
2014	British GT Championship - GT3	AF Corse	1	0	0	0	0	15	28th
2014	GT Asia Series - GT3	Clearwater Racing	2	1	1	0	1	22	28th
2014	European Le Mans Series - GTC	Team Ukraine	1	1	0	0	1	25	10th
2014	Stock Car Brasil	Red Bull Racing	1	0	0	0	0	0	NC†
2014	United SportsCar Championship - GTD	Level 5 Motorsports	1	1	0	0	1	36	53rd
2015	European Le Mans Series - LMGTE	AT Racing	5	1	2	2	1	55	5th
2015	GT Asia Series - GT3	Clearwater Racing	2	0	0	0	0	9	42nd
2015	Pirelli World Challenge - GT	NGT Motorsport	1	0	1	1	1	118	38th
2015	Blancpain Endurance Series - Pro-Am Cup	AF Corse	1	1	0	0	1	46	6th
2015	Blancpain Endurance Series - Pro Cup	Akka ASP	2	0	0	0	0	9	21st
2015	12 Hours of Sepang - GT3	Singha Motorsport	1	0	0	0	0	N/A	8th
2016	European Le Mans Series - GTE	AT Racing	5	0	1	2	3	64	5th
2016	Blancpain GT Series Endurance Cup	AF Corse	4	0	1	0	0	0	NC
2016	FIA World Endurance Championship - LMGTE Pro	AF Corse	1	0	0	0	0	1	15th
2016	24 Hours of Le Mans - LMGTE Pro	AF Corse	1	0	0	0	0	N/A	DNF
2016	IMSA SportsCar Championship - GTLM	Scuderia Corsa	5	0	0	1	1	138	11th
2016	12 Hours of Sepang - GT3	Spirit of Race	1	0	0	1	0	N/A	4th
2016–17	Asian Le Mans Series - GT	Team BBT	4	0	2	1	3	53	**3rd**
2017	FIA World Endurance Championship - LMGTE Pro	AF Corse	9	3	0	1	7	153	**1st**
2017	24 Hours of Le Mans - LMGTE Pro	AF Corse	1	0	0	0	0	N/A	11th
2017	Intercontinental GT Challenge	AF Corse	1	0	0	0	0	0	NC
2017	IMSA SportsCar Championship - GTLM	Risi Competizione	1	0	0	1	1	31	22nd
2017	IMSA SportsCar Championship - GTD	Spirit of Race	1	0	1	1	0	9	82nd
2017	Blancpain GT Series Endurance Cup	AF Corse	5	0	1	1	1	27	12th
2018	IMSA SportsCar Championship - GTD	Scuderia Corsa	1	0	0	1	1	30	51st
2018	IMSA SportsCar Championship - GTLM	Risi Competizione	2	0	0	0	0	52	17th
2018	Blancpain GT Series Endurance Cup - Pro-Am	Kessel Racing	2	0	1	1	0	1	29th
2018	Gulf 12 Hours	Kessel Racing	1	1	1	0	1	N/A	**1st**
2018	International GT Open	Luzich Racing	12	4	0	3	7	108	**3rd**
2018	24 Hours of Le Mans - LMGTE Pro	AF Corse	1	0	0	0	0	N/A	7th
2018–19	FIA World Endurance Championship - LMGTE Pro	AF Corse	8	2	0	0	3	136.5	**2nd**
2018–19	Asian Le Mans Series - GT	Spirit of Race	4	0	1	0	4	67	**2nd**
2019	European Le Mans Series - LMGTE	Luzich Racing	6	4	0	2	5	127	**1st**
2019	24 Hours of Le Mans - LMGTE Pro	AF Corse	1	1	0	0	1	N/A	**1st**
2019	Blancpain GT Series Endurance Cup	AF Corse	1	0	0	0	0	0	NC
2019	IMSA SportsCar Championship - GTLM	Risi Competizione	2	1	0	0	2	67	20th
2019	Intercontinental GT Challenge	SMP Racing	1	0	0	0	0	0	NC
2019–20	FIA World Endurance Championship - LMGTE Pro	AF Corse	7	0	1	1	2	131	6th
2019–20	Asian Le Mans Series - GT	Spirit of Race	3	0	0	1	2	42	8th
2020	GT World Challenge Europe Endurance Cup	AF Corse	4	1	0	0	1	79	**1st**
2020	24 Hours of Le Mans - LMGTE Pro	AF Corse	1	0	0	0	1	N/A	**2nd**
2020	IMSA SportsCar Championship - GTLM	Risi Competizione	1	1	0	0	0	25	16th
2020	Intercontinental GT Challenge	SMP Racing	1	0	0	0	0	0	NC
2021	FIA World Endurance Championship - LMGTE Pro	AF Corse	6	3	0	0	6	177	**1st**
2021	24 Hours of Le Mans - LMGTE Pro	AF Corse	1	1	0	0	1	N/A	**1st**
2021	Asian Le Mans Series - GT	AF Corse	4	0	0	0	0	5	13th
2021	GT World Challenge Europe Endurance Cup	Iron Lynx Motorsport Lab	5	1	0	0	1	83	**1st**
2021	Intercontinental GT Challenge	Iron Lynx Motorsport Lab	1	1	0	0	1	55	**1st**
2021	Intercontinental GT Challenge	AF Corse - Francorchamps Motors	2	0	1	1	1	55	**1st**
2021	European Le Mans Series - LMGTE	Spirit of Race	1	1	1	1	1	26	16th
2021	IMSA SportsCar Championship - GTLM	Risi Competizione	1	0	0	1	0	308	13th
2022	Asian Le Mans Series - GT	AF Corse	4	0	0	0	0	2	15th
2022	FIA World Endurance Championship - LMGTE Pro	AF Corse	6	2	1	0	4	135	**1st**
2022	24 Hours of Le Mans - LMGTE Pro	AF Corse	1	0	0	0	1	N/A	**2nd**
2022	IMSA SportsCar Championship - GTD Pro	Risi Competizione	1	0	0	0	1	340	23rd
2023	FIA World Endurance Championship - Hypercar	Ferrari AF Corse	7	1	0	0	2	114	4th
2023	24 Hours of Le Mans - Hypercar	Ferrari AF Corse	1	1	0	0	1	N/A	**1st**
2023	IMSA SportsCar Championship - GTD Pro	Risi Competizione	2	0	0	0	1	559	17th
2023	GT World Challenge Europe Endurance Cup	AF Corse - Francorchamps Motors	1	0	0	0	0	0	NC
2024	FIA World Endurance Championship - Hypercar	Ferrari AF Corse	8	0	0	0	1	59	8th
2024	GT World Challenge Europe Endurance Cup	AF Corse - Francorchamps Motors	5	0	2	1	3	71	**1st**
2024	IMSA SportsCar Championship - GTD Pro	Risi Competizione	2	1	0	0	2	714	24th
2025	FIA World Endurance Championship - Hypercar	Ferrari AF Corse	8	0	0	2	4	133	**1st**
2025	IMSA SportsCar Championship - GTD	AF Corse	5	1	1	1	1	1163	24th
2025	GT World Challenge Europe Endurance Cup	AF Corse - Francorchamps Motors	4	0	0	1	1	22	13th
2025–26	Asian Le Mans Series - GT	Vista AF Corse	2	0	0	0	0	10	20th
2026	IMSA SportsCar Championship - GTD Pro	Risi Competizione	3	0	0	0	0	672	24th
2026	FIA World Endurance Championship - Hypercar	Ferrari AF Corse							

^{†} As Pier Guidi was a guest driver, he was ineligible to score points.
* Season still in progress.

=== Complete Formula Renault 2.0 Italia results ===
Year	Team	1	2	3	4	5	6	7	8	9	10	Pos	Points
2002	Birel Formula	VLL; 9	PER; Ret	PER; Ret	SPA; 15	MAG; 14	MNZ; 6	VAI; 12	IMO; 16	MIS; Ret	MUG; 16	18th	14

=== Superleague Formula ===
(Races in bold indicate pole position) (Races in italics indicate fastest lap)

Year	Team	Operator	1		2		3		4		5		6		Position	Points
2008	Galatasaray S.K.	Scuderia Playteam	DON		NÜR		ZOL		EST		VAL		JER		8th	277
2008	Galatasaray S.K.	Scuderia Playteam	13	13	3	7	14	12	7	3	3	11	18	**4**	8th	277

=== Complete GT1 World Championship results ===
Year	Team	Car	1	2	3	4	5	6	7	8	9	10	11	12	13	14	15	16	17	18	19	20	Pos	Points
2010	Triple H Team Hegersport	Maserati	ABU; QR	ABU; CR	SIL; QR	SIL; CR	BRN; QR	BRN; CR	PRI; QR	PRI; CR	SPA; QR	SPA; CR	NÜR; QR; Ret	NÜR; CR; 9	ALG; QR; 18	ALG; CR; 19	NAV; QR; 2	NAV; CR; 11	INT; QR	INT; CR	SAN; QR; 8	SAN; CR; Ret	38th	8

=== Complete GT World Challenge Europe results ===
==== GT World Challenge Europe Endurance Cup ====
Year	Team	Car	Class	1	2	3	4	5	6	7	Pos.	Points
Blancpain Endurance Series
2012	AF Corse	Ferrari 458 GT3	Pro-Am	MNZ	SIL	LEC	SPA; 5	NÜR	NAV; 16		10th	46
2013	Esta Motorsport	Ferrari 458 GT3	Pro							NÜR; 4	9th	25
2013	SMP Racing	Ferrari 458 GT3	Pro	MNZ; 9	SIL; 24	LEC; 6					9th	25
2013	SMP Racing	Ferrari 458 GT3	Pro-Am				SPA; 6H; 12	SPA; 12H; 10	**SPA**; **24H**; 12		19th	24
2014	AF Corse	Ferrari 458 GT3	Pro-Am	MNZ	SIL	LEC	SPA; 6H; 55†	SPA; 12H; 55†	SPA; 24H; Ret	NÜR	NC	0
2015	AKKA ASP	Ferrari 458 GT3	Pro	MNZ	SIL	LEC; 7				NÜR; Ret	21st	9
2015	AF Corse	Ferrari 458 GT3	Pro-Am				SPA; 6H; 11	SPA; 12H; 6	SPA; 24H; 4		6th	46
Blancpain GT Series Endurance Cup
2016	AF Corse	Ferrari 488 GT3	Pro	MNZ; Ret	SIL; 16	**LEC**; 2	SPA; 6H; 32	SPA; 12H; 10	SPA; 24H; 16	NÜR; 32	12th	25
2017	Spirit of Race	Ferrari 488 GT3	Pro	**MNZ**; 2	SIL; 6	LEC; 23	SPA; 6H; 63	SPA; 12H; 63	SPA; 24H; Ret	CAT; 15	14th	27
2018	Kessel Racing	Ferrari 488 GT3	Pro-Am	**MNZ**; 26 (Note: The No. 11 Kessel Racing Ferrari remained in race results at Monza, but was considered invisible and ineligible for points in the Drivers' and Teams' championships. Alessandro Pier Guidi was forced to exceed his maximum driver time, due to an injury suffered by his co-driver Michał Broniszewski in the paddock.)	SIL	LEC	SPA; 6H	SPA; 12H	SPA; 24H	CAT; Ret	29th	1
2019	AF Corse	Ferrari 488 GT3	Pro	MNZ	SIL	LEC	SPA; 6H; 44	SPA; 12H; 57	SPA; 24H; Ret	CAT	NC	0
GT World Challenge Europe Endurance Cup
2020	AF Corse	Ferrari 488 GT3	Pro	IMO; 7 (Note: A drive-through penalty was wrongfully handed out to Calado, Nielsen and Pier Guidi at Imola. A request by the AF Corse team to be awarded with points for second place was accepted by the sporting board.)	NÜR; Ret	SPA; 6H; 4	SPA; 12H; 1	SPA; 24H; 5	LEC; 1		1st	79
2021	Iron Lynx	Ferrari 488 GT3 Evo 2020	Pro	MNZ; 5	LEC; 5	SPA; 6H; 1	SPA; 12H; 1	SPA; 24H; 1	NÜR; 7	CAT; 7	1st	83
2022	Iron Lynx	Ferrari 488 GT3 Evo 2020	Pro	IMO	LEC	SPA; 6H	SPA; 12H	SPA; 24H	HOC	**CAT**; 2	19th	19
2023	AF Corse - Francorchamps Motors	Ferrari 296 GT3	Pro	MNZ; 14	LEC	SPA; 6H	SPA; 12H	SPA; 24H	NÜR	CAT	NC	0
2024	AF Corse - Francorchamps Motors	Ferrari 296 GT3	Pro	LEC; 9	SPA; 6H; 5	SPA; 12H; 4	SPA; 24H; 2	NÜR; 8	**MNZ**; 3	**JED**; 3	1st	71
2025	AF Corse - Francorchamps Motors	Ferrari 296 GT3	Pro	LEC; 15	MNZ; 49†	SPA; 6H; 12	SPA; 12H; 3	SPA; 24H; 3	NÜR; 46†	CAT	13th	22

=== Complete FIA World Endurance Championship results ===
(key) (Races in bold indicate pole position; races in italics indicate fastest lap)

Year	Entrant	Class	Car	Engine	1	2	3	4	5	6	7	8	9	Rank	Points
2014	AF Corse	LMGTE Am	Ferrari 458 Italia GT2	Ferrari 4.5 L V8	SIL	SPA	LMS	COA	FUJ	SHA	BHR; 7	SÃO; 6		18th	16
2016	AF Corse	LMGTE Pro	Ferrari 488 GTE	Ferrari F154CB 3.9 L Turbo V8	SIL	SPA	LMS; Ret	NÜR	MEX	COA	FUJ	SHA	BHR	27th	1
2017	AF Corse	LMGTE Pro	Ferrari 488 GTE	Ferrari F154CB 3.9 L Turbo V8	SIL; 2	SPA; 2	LMS; 14	NÜR; 1	MEX; 6	COA; 1	FUJ; 1	SHA; 3	BHR; 2	1st	153
2018–19	AF Corse	LMGTE Pro	Ferrari 488 GTE	Ferrari F154CB 3.9 L Turbo V8	SPA; 15	LMS; 4	SIL; 1	FUJ; 4	SHA; 5	SEB; 4	SPA; 2	LMS; 1		2nd	136.5
2019–20	AF Corse	LMGTE Pro	Ferrari 488 GTE Evo	Ferrari F154CB 3.9 L Turbo V8	**SIL**; 4	FUJ; 4	SHA; 1	BHR; 4	COA; 3	SPA; 4	LMS; 2	BHR		6th	131
2021	AF Corse	LMGTE Pro	Ferrari 488 GTE Evo	Ferrari F154CB 3.9 L Turbo V8	SPA; 2	ALG; 1	MNZ; 2	LMS; 1	BHR; 3	BHR; 1				1st	177
2022	AF Corse	LMGTE Pro	Ferrari 488 GTE Evo	Ferrari F154CB 3.9 L Turbo V8	SEB; 4	SPA; 1	LMS; 2	**MNZ**; 3	FUJ; 1	BHR; 5				1st	135
2023	Ferrari AF Corse	Hypercar	Ferrari 499P	Ferrari F163CG 3.0 L Turbo V6	SEB; 7	PRT; 6	SPA; 3	LMS; 1	MNZ; 5	FUJ; 5	BHR; 6			4th	114
2024	Ferrari AF Corse	Hypercar	Ferrari 499P	Ferrari F163CG 3.0 L Turbo V6	QAT; 12	IMO; 7	SPA; 4	LMS; 3	SÃO; 5	**COA**; Ret	FUJ; Ret	BHR; 14		8th	59
2025	Ferrari AF Corse	Hypercar	Ferrari 499P	Ferrari F163CG 3.0 L Turbo V6	**QAT**; 3	**IMO**; 1	SPA; 1	LMS; 3	SÃO; 11	COA; 5	FUJ; 15	BHR; 4		1st	133
2026	Ferrari AF Corse	Hypercar	Ferrari 499P	Ferrari F163CG 3.0 L Turbo V6	**IMO**; 2	SPA; Ret	LMS; 5	SÃO; 2	COA	FUJ	CAT	MNZ		4th*	57*

^{*} Season still in progress.

=== Complete 24 Hours of Le Mans results ===
Year	Team	Co-Drivers	Car	Class	Laps	Pos.	Class Pos.
2016	(Italy) AF Corse	(Italy) Gianmaria Bruni (United Kingdom) James Calado	Ferrari 488 GTE	GTE; Pro	179	DNF	DNF
2017	(Italy) AF Corse	(Italy) Michele Rugolo (United Kingdom) James Calado	Ferrari 488 GTE	GTE; Pro	312	46th	11th
2018	(Italy) AF Corse	(United Kingdom) James Calado (Brazil) Daniel Serra	Ferrari 488 GTE Evo	GTE; Pro	339	22nd	7th
2019	(Italy) AF Corse	(United Kingdom) James Calado (Brazil) Daniel Serra	Ferrari 488 GTE Evo	GTE; Pro	342	20th	**1st**
2020	(Italy) AF Corse	(United Kingdom) James Calado (Brazil) Daniel Serra	Ferrari 488 GTE Evo	GTE; Pro	346	21st	**2nd**
2021	(Italy) AF Corse	(United Kingdom) James Calado (France) Côme Ledogar	Ferrari 488 GTE Evo	GTE; Pro	345	20th	**1st**
2022	(Italy) AF Corse	(United Kingdom) James Calado (Brazil) Daniel Serra	Ferrari 488 GTE Evo	GTE; Pro	350	29th	**2nd**
2023	(Italy) Ferrari AF Corse	(United Kingdom) James Calado (Italy) Antonio Giovinazzi	Ferrari 499P	Hypercar	342	**1st**	**1st**
2024	(Italy) Ferrari AF Corse	(United Kingdom) James Calado (Italy) Antonio Giovinazzi	Ferrari 499P	Hypercar	311	**3rd**	**3rd**
2025	(Italy) Ferrari AF Corse	(United Kingdom) James Calado (Italy) Antonio Giovinazzi	Ferrari 499P	Hypercar	387	**3rd**	**3rd**
2026	(Italy) Ferrari AF Corse	(United Kingdom) James Calado (Italy) Antonio Giovinazzi	Ferrari 499P	Hypercar	381	5th	5th

=== Complete IMSA SportsCar Championship results ===
(key) (Races in bold indicate pole position; results in italics indicate fastest lap)

Year	Team	Class	Make	Engine	1	2	3	4	5	6	7	8	9	10	11	12	Pos.	Points	Ref
2014	Level 5 Motorsports	GTD	Ferrari 458 Italia GT3	Ferrari F136 4.5 L V8	DAY; 1	SEB	LGA	DET	WGL	MOS	IMS	ELK	VIR	COA	PET		53rd	36	
2016	Scuderia Corsa	GTLM	Ferrari 488 GTE	Ferrari F154CB 3.9 L Turbo V8	DAY; 4	SEB; 7	LBH	**LGA**; 2	WGL; 5	MOS	LIM	ELK	VIR	COA	PET; 8		11th	138	
2017	Spirit of Race	GTD	Ferrari 488 GT3	Ferrari F154CB 3.9 L Turbo V8	**DAY**; 23	SEB	LBH	COA	DET	WGL	MOS	LIM	ELK	VIR	LGA		81st	9	
2017	Risi Competizione	GTLM	Ferrari 488 GTE	Ferrari F154CB 3.9 L Turbo V8												PET; 3	22nd	31	
2018	Risi Competizione	GTLM	Ferrari 488 GTE	Ferrari F154CB 3.9 L Turbo V8	DAY; 5	SEB; 5	LBH	MDO	WGL	MOS	LIM	ELK	VIR	LGA	PET		17th	52	
2019	Risi Competizione	GTLM	Ferrari 488 GTE	Ferrari F154CB 3.9 L Turbo V8	DAY; 2	SEB	LBH	MDO	WGL	MOS	LIM	ELK	VIR	LGA	**PET**; 1		20th	67	
2020	Risi Competizione	GTLM	Ferrari 488 GTE	Ferrari F154CB 3.9 L Turbo V8	DAY; 6	DAY	SEB	ELK	VIR	ATL	MDO	CLT	PET	LGA	SEB		16th	25	
2021	Risi Competizione	GTLM	Ferrari 488 GTE	Ferrari F154CB 3.9 L Turbo V8	DAY; 4	SEB	DET	WGL	WGL	LIM	ELK	LGA	LBH	VIR	PET		13th	308	
2022	Risi Competizione	GTD Pro	Ferrari 488 GT3 Evo 2020	Ferrari F154CB 3.9 L Turbo V8	DAY; 2	SEB	LBH	LGA	WGL	MOS	LIM	ELK	VIR	PET			23rd	340	
2023	Risi Competizione	GTD Pro	Ferrari 296 GT3	Ferrari F163CE 3.0 L Turbo V6	DAY; 10	SEB	LBH	MON	WGL	MOS	LIM	ELK	VIR	IMS	PET; 3		17th	559	
2024	Risi Competizione	GTD Pro	Ferrari 296 GT3	Ferrari F163CE 3.0 L Turbo V6	DAY; 1	SEB	LGA	DET	WGL	MOS	ELK	VIR	IMS	PET; 2			24th	714	
2025	AF Corse	GTD	Ferrari 296 GT3	Ferrari F163CE 3.0 L Turbo V6	DAY; 16	**SEB**; 16	LBH	LGA	WGL; 5	MOS	ELK	VIR	IMS; 18	PET; 1			24th	1163	
2026	Risi Competizione	GTD Pro	Ferrari 296 GT3 Evo	Ferrari F163CE 3.0 L Turbo V6	DAY; 15	SEB; 13	LGA	DET	WGL	MOS	ELK	VIR	IMS	PET; 5			24th	672	

=== Complete European Le Mans Series results ===
(key) (Races in bold indicate pole position; results in italics indicate fastest lap)

Year	Entrant	Class	Chassis	Engine	1	2	3	4	5	6	Pos.	Points
2014	Team Ukraine	GTC	Ferrari 458 Italia GT3	Ferrari F136 4.5 L V8	SIL; 1	IMO	RBR	LEC	EST		10th	25
2015	AT Racing	LMGTE	Ferrari 458 Italia GT2	Ferrari F136 4.5 L V8	SIL; 7	**IMO**; 1	RBR; 8	**LEC**; 5	EST; 6		5th	55
2016	AT Racing	LMGTE	Ferrari 458 Italia GT2	Ferrari F136 4.5 L V8	SIL; 2	IMO	RBR; 3	LEC; 4	**SPA**; Ret	EST; 2	5th	64
2019	Luzich Racing	LMGTE	Ferrari 488 GTE	Ferrari F154CB 3.9 L Turbo V8	LEC; 1	MNZ; 3					1st	127
2019	Luzich Racing	LMGTE	Ferrari 488 GTE Evo	Ferrari F154CB 3.9 L Turbo V8			CAT; 1	SIL; 4	SPA; 1	ALG; 1	1st	127
2021	Spirit of Race	LMGTE	Ferrari 488 GTE Evo	Ferrari F154CB 3.9 L Turbo V8	CAT	RBR	LEC	**MNZ**; 1	SPA	ALG	13th	26

=== Complete Asian Le Mans Series results ===
(key) (Races in bold indicate pole position; results in italics indicate fastest lap)

Year	Team	Class	Car	Engine	1	2	3	4	5	6	Pos.	Points
2016–17	Team BBT	GT	Ferrari 488 GT3	Ferrari F154CB 3.9 L Turbo V8	ZHU; DNS	**FUJ**; 2	**BUR**; 2	SEP; 3			3rd	53
2018–19	Spirit of Race	GT	Ferrari 488 GT3	Ferrari F154CB 3.9 L Turbo V8	SHA; 2	FUJ; 2	**BUR**; 3	SEP; 3			2nd	87
2019–20	Spirit of Race	GT	Ferrari 488 GT3	Ferrari F154CB 3.9 L Turbo V8	SHA; 4	BEN; 3	CHA; 3	SEP			8th	42
2021	AF Corse	GT	Ferrari 488 GT3	Ferrari F154CB 3.9 L Turbo V8	DUB; 1; 14	DUB; 2; 14	ABU; 1; 8	ABU; 2 Ret			13th	5
2022	AF Corse	GT	Ferrari 488 GT3 Evo 2020	Ferrari F154CB 3.9 L Turbo V8	DUB; 1; 13	DUB; 2; 18	ABU; 1; 18	ABU; 2; 13			15th	2
2025–26	Vista AF Corse	GT	Ferrari 296 GT3	Ferrari F163CE 3.0 L Turbo V6	SEP; 1; 11	SEP; 2; 5	DUB; 1	DUB; 2	ABU; 1	ABU; 2	20th	10

Sporting positions
Preceded by Nicki Thiim; Marco Sørensen	World Endurance GT Drivers' Championship; Champion; 2017; With: James Calado	Succeeded by Michael Christensen; Kevin Estre
Preceded by Marco Mapelli; Andrea Caldarelli (Blancpain GT Series Endurance Cup)	GT World Challenge Europe Endurance Cup; Champion; 2020-2021; With: Nicklas Nielsen & Côme Ledogar (2021)	Succeeded by Raffaele Marciello; Daniel Juncadella; Jules Gounon
Preceded by Nicki Thiim; Marco Sørensen	World Endurance GT Drivers' Championship; Champion; 2021-2022; With: James Calado	Succeeded by Incumbent
Preceded by Nicky Catsburg; Augusto Farfus	Intercontinental GT Challenge; Champion; 2021–22; With: Côme Ledogar	Succeeded by Daniel Juncadella
Preceded by Sébastien Buemi; Brendon Hartley; Ryō Hirakawa	Winner of the 24 Hours of Le Mans; 2023; With: James Calado & Antonio Giovinazzi	Succeeded by Antonio Fuoco; Miguel Molina; Nicklas Nielsen
