= 2007 International GT Open =

Seasons
- ← 2006 2008 →

The 2007 International GT Open season was the second season of the International GT Open, the grand tourer-style sports car racing founded in 2006 by the Spanish GT Sport Organización. It began on 21 April at ACI Vallelunga Circuit and finished on 11 November, at Barcelona after six double-header meetings with one single race round.

Overall championship was won by Autorlando drivers Joël Camathias and Richard Lietz, GTA class was won by Scuderia Playteam SaraFree drivers Michele Maceratesi and Andrea Montermini, while GTS class title was clinched by Riccardo Romagnoli.

== Race calendar and results ==
| Round | | Circuit | Date | Pole position | GTA Winner | GTB Winner | GTS Winner |
|---|---|---|---|---|---|---|---|
| 1 | R1 | (Italy) ACI Vallelunga Circuit, Campagnano di Roma | 21 April | (Italy) No. 1 Scuderia Playteam SaraFree | (Italy) No. 1 Scuderia Playteam SaraFree | (Italy) No. 44 Gianni Giudici | (Italy) No. 33 Escuderia La Torre |
| 1 | R1 | (Italy) ACI Vallelunga Circuit, Campagnano di Roma | 21 April | (Italy) Michele Maceratesi (Italy) Andrea Montermini | (Italy) Michele Maceratesi (Italy) Andrea Montermini | (Italy) Giuseppe Arlotti (Italy) Fabrizio Gini | (Italy) Andrea Larini (Italy) Riccardo Romagnoli |
| 1 | R2 | (Italy) ACI Vallelunga Circuit, Campagnano di Roma | 22 April | (Italy) No. 1 Scuderia Playteam SaraFree | (Italy) No. 3 Scuderia Playteam SaraFree | (Italy) No. 43 Gianni Giudici | (Italy) No. 33 Escuderia La Torre |
| 1 | R2 | (Italy) ACI Vallelunga Circuit, Campagnano di Roma | 22 April | (Italy) Michele Maceratesi (Italy) Andrea Montermini | (Italy) Max Busnelli (Italy) Mauro Massironi | (Italy) Gianni Giudici (Italy) Alessandro Nannini | (Italy) Andrea Larini (Italy) Riccardo Romagnoli |
| 2 | R1 | (Spain) Circuit Ricardo Tormo, Cheste | 19 May | (Spain) No. 2 Escuderia Bengala | (Spain) No. 2 Escuderia Bengala | (France) No. 45 Team Sofrev — ASP | (Italy) No. 33 Escuderia La Torre |
| 2 | R1 | (Spain) Circuit Ricardo Tormo, Cheste | 19 May | (Spain) Lucas Guerrero (Spain) José Manuel Pérez-Aicart | (Spain) Lucas Guerrero (Spain) José Manuel Pérez-Aicart | (France) Morgan Moullin-Traffort (France) Maurice Ricci | (Italy) Andrea Larini (Italy) Riccardo Romagnoli |
| 2 | R2 | (Spain) Circuit Ricardo Tormo, Cheste | 20 May | (Italy) No. 19 GPC | (Italy) No. 19 GPC | (France) No. 45 Team Sofrev — ASP | (Italy) No. 54 Racing Box |
| 2 | R2 | (Spain) Circuit Ricardo Tormo, Cheste | 20 May | (Italy) Alessandro Bonetti (Austria) Philipp Peter | (Italy) Alessandro Bonetti (Austria) Philipp Peter | (France) Morgan Moullin-Traffort (France) Maurice Ricci | (Italy) Andrea Ceccato (Italy) Marco Visconti |
| 3 | R1 | (France) Circuit de Nevers Magny-Cours, Magny-Cours | 14 July | (Spain) No. 15 Sun-Red | (Italy) No. 11 Autorlando | (France) No. 52 Team Sofrev — ASP | (Italy) No. 60 Racing Box |
| 3 | R1 | (France) Circuit de Nevers Magny-Cours, Magny-Cours | 14 July | (Spain) Jordi Gené (Spain) Juan Ramón Zapata | (Switzerland) Joël Camathias (Austria) Richard Lietz | (France) Timothée Ghislain (France) Gérard Tonelli | (Italy) Marco Cioci (Italy) Ferdinando Geri |
| 3 | R2 | (France) Circuit de Nevers Magny-Cours, Magny-Cours | 15 July | (Spain) No. 5 ESV Motorsport | (Spain) No. 5 ESV Motorsport | (France) No. 52 Team Sofrev — ASP | (France) No. 61 Team Sofrev — ASP |
| 3 | R2 | (France) Circuit de Nevers Magny-Cours, Magny-Cours | 15 July | (Spain) Domingo Romero (Sweden) Peter Sundberg | (Spain) Domingo Romero (Sweden) Peter Sundberg | (France) Timothée Ghislain (France) Gérard Tonelli | (France) Nicholas Maillert (France) Olivier Porta |
| 4 | R1 | (Germany) Motorsport Arena Oschersleben, Oschersleben | 25 August | (Italy) No. 1 Scuderia Playteam SaraFree | (Italy) No. 1 Scuderia Playteam SaraFree | (Italy) No. 43 Gianni Giudici | (Italy) No. 3 Scuderia Playteam SaraFree |
| 4 | R1 | (Germany) Motorsport Arena Oschersleben, Oschersleben | 25 August | (Italy) Michele Maceratesi (Italy) Andrea Montermini | (Italy) Michele Maceratesi (Italy) Andrea Montermini | (Italy) Gianni Giudici (Italy) Andrea Perlini | (Italy) Gabriele Lancieri (Italy) Diego Romanini |
| 4 | R2 | (Germany) Motorsport Arena Oschersleben, Oschersleben | 26 August | (Italy) No. 11 Autorlando | (Italy) No. 11 Autorlando | (Italy) No. 43 Gianni Giudici | (Italy) No. 40 Scuderia Latorre |
| 4 | R2 | (Germany) Motorsport Arena Oschersleben, Oschersleben | 26 August | (Switzerland) Joël Camathias (Austria) Richard Lietz | (Switzerland) Joël Camathias (Austria) Richard Lietz | (Italy) Gianni Giudici (Italy) Andrea Perlini | (Italy) Emanuele Smurra (Italy) Davide Stancheris |
| 5 | R1 | (United Kingdom) Brands Hatch, Kent | 22 September | (Italy) No. 3 Scuderia Playteam SaraFree | (Italy) No. 3 Scuderia Playteam SaraFree | (Italy) No. 43 Gianni Giudici | (Italy) No. 39 Villois Racing |
| 5 | R1 | (United Kingdom) Brands Hatch, Kent | 22 September | (Italy) Max Busnelli (Italy) Mauro Massironi | (Italy) Max Busnelli (Italy) Mauro Massironi | (Italy) Gianni Giudici (Italy) Raffaele Raimondi | (Italy) Marco Petrini (Italy) Max Weiser |
| 5 | R2 | (United Kingdom) Brands Hatch, Kent | 23 September | (Italy) No. 11 Autorlando | (Italy) No. 1 Scuderia Playteam SaraFree | (Italy) No. 43 Gianni Giudici | (Spain) No. 61 Jaime Sainz de Baranda |
| 5 | R2 | (United Kingdom) Brands Hatch, Kent | 23 September | (Switzerland) Joël Camathias (Austria) Richard Lietz | (Italy) Michele Maceratesi (Italy) Andrea Montermini | (Italy) Gianni Giudici (Italy) Raffaele Raimondi | (Spain) Miguel Ángel de Castro (Spain) Jaime Sainz de Baranda |
| 6 | R1 | (Italy) Autodromo Nazionale Monza | 6 October | (Italy) No. 1 Scuderia Playteam SaraFree | (Italy) No. 3 Scuderia Playteam SaraFree | (Spain) No. 42 Roger Racing | (Italy) No. 33 Escuderia La Torre |
| 6 | R1 | (Italy) Autodromo Nazionale Monza | 6 October | (Italy) Michele Maceratesi (Italy) Andrea Montermini | (Italy) Max Busnelli (Italy) Mauro Massironi | (Spain) Chano Arias (Netherlands) Henk van Zoest | (Italy) Elio Marchetti (Italy) Riccardo Romagnoli |
| 6 | R2 | (Italy) Autodromo Nazionale Monza | 7 October | (Italy) No. 11 Autorlando | (Italy) No. 11 Autorlando | (Italy) No. 43 Gianni Giudici | (Italy) No. 39 Villois Racing |
| 6 | R2 | (Italy) Autodromo Nazionale Monza | 7 October | (Switzerland) Joël Camathias (Austria) Richard Lietz | (Switzerland) Joël Camathias (Austria) Richard Lietz | (Italy) Gianni Giudici (Italy) Alessandro Nannini | (Italy) Marco Petrini (Italy) Max Weiser |
| 7 | R | (Spain) Circuit de Catalunya, Montmeló | 11 November | (Italy) No. 18 GPC | (Italy) No. 18 GPC | (Spain) No. 66 Lario Racing | (Italy) No. 55 Giacomo Petrobelli |
| 7 | R | (Spain) Circuit de Catalunya, Montmeló | 11 November | (Italy) Alessandro Bonetti (Italy) Paolo Ruberti | (Italy) Alessandro Bonetti (Italy) Paolo Ruberti | (Italy) Angelo Ciacci (Spain) Joan Lario | (Italy) Giacomo Petrobelli (France) Gilles Vannelet |
