= 2006 International GT Open =

Seasons
- ← none 2007 →

The 2006 International GT Open season was the inaugural season of the International GT Open, the grand tourer-style sports car racing founded by the Spanish GT Sport Organización. It began on 1 April at Autodromo Nazionale Monza and finished on 12 November, at Barcelona after five double-header meetings with one single race round.

Overall championship and GTA class was won by Playteam SaraFree driver Michele Bartyan, while GTB class title was clinched by Fabrizio Gini and GTS class by Andrea Belicchi and Stefano Zonca.

== Race calendar and results ==
Round		Circuit	Date	Pole position	GTA Winner	GTB Winner	GTS Winner
1	R1	(Italy) Autodromo Nazionale Monza	21 April	(Italy) No. 36 Playteam SaraFree	(Spain) No. 2 Esc. Bengala	(Italy) No. 29 Racing Box	(Italy) No. 27 Racing Box
1	R1	(Italy) Autodromo Nazionale Monza	21 April	(Italy) Michele Bartyan (Italy) Alessandro Pier Guidi	(Spain) Lucas Guerrero (Spain) José Manuel Pérez-Aicart	(Italy) Marco Cioci (Italy) Piergiuseppe Perazzini	(Italy) Andrea Belicchi (Italy) Stefano Zonca
1	R2	(Italy) Autodromo Nazionale Monza	22 April	(Spain) No. 2 Esc. Bengala	(Italy) No. 36 Playteam SaraFree	(Spain) No. 43 Roger Racing	(Italy) No. 28 Racing Box
1	R2	(Italy) Autodromo Nazionale Monza	22 April	(Spain) Lucas Guerrero (Spain) José Manuel Pérez-Aicart	(Italy) Michele Bartyan (Italy) Alessandro Pier Guidi	(Spain) Ángel Santos (Netherlands) Henk van Zoest	(Italy) Luca Cappellari (Italy) Angelo Lancelotti
2	R1	(France) Circuit de Nevers Magny-Cours, Magny-Cours	29 April	(Italy) No. 36 Playteam SaraFree	(Italy) No. 36 Playteam SaraFree	(Italy) No. 29 Racing Box	(Italy) No. 33 Paolo Cutrera
2	R1	(France) Circuit de Nevers Magny-Cours, Magny-Cours	29 April	(Italy) Michele Bartyan (Italy) Alessandro Pier Guidi	(Italy) Michele Bartyan (Italy) Alessandro Pier Guidi	(Italy) Marco Cioci (Italy) Piergiuseppe Perazzini	(Italy) Paolo Cutrera (Italy) Gianni Giudici
2	R2	(France) Circuit de Nevers Magny-Cours, Magny-Cours	30 April	(Italy) No. 20 Edil Cris Racing Team	(Italy) No. 20 Edil Cris Racing Team	(Italy) No. 29 Racing Box	(Spain) No. 42 Fernando Glez.-Camino
2	R2	(France) Circuit de Nevers Magny-Cours, Magny-Cours	30 April	(Italy) Matteo Cressoni (Italy) Paolo Ruberti	(Italy) Matteo Cressoni (Italy) Paolo Ruberti	(Italy) Marco Cioci (Italy) Piergiuseppe Perazzini	(Spain) Juan Ignacio Villacieros (Andorra) Francesc Robert
3	R1	(Portugal) Autódromo do Estoril, Estoril	24 June	(Italy) No. 20 Edil Cris Racing Team	(Italy) No. 53 GPC Sport	(Spain) No. 46 Cesar Rodrigo Perez	(Italy) No. 27 Racing Box
3	R1	(Portugal) Autódromo do Estoril, Estoril	24 June	(Italy) Matteo Bobbi (Italy) Paolo Ruberti	(Portugal) Pedro Bastos (Italy) Andrea Montermini	(Spain) Cesar Rodrigo (Spain) Daniel Rodrigo	(Italy) Andrea Belicchi (Italy) Stefano Zonca
3	R2	(Portugal) Autódromo do Estoril, Estoril	25 June	(Italy) No. 20 Edil Cris Racing Team	(Italy) No. 20 Edil Cris Racing Team	(Spain) No. 46 Cesar Rodrigo Perez	(Italy) No. 27 Racing Box
3	R2	(Portugal) Autódromo do Estoril, Estoril	25 June	(Italy) Matteo Bobbi (Italy) Paolo Ruberti	(Italy) Matteo Bobbi (Italy) Paolo Ruberti	(Spain) Cesar Rodrigo (Spain) Daniel Rodrigo	(Italy) Andrea Belicchi (Italy) Stefano Zonca
4	R1	(Turkey) Istanbul Park, Istanbul	23 September	(Spain) No. 5 RSV Motorsport	(Spain) No. 2 Esc. Bengala	(Italy) No. 35 Gianni Giudici	(Italy) No. 27 Racing Box
4	R1	(Turkey) Istanbul Park, Istanbul	23 September	(Spain) Domingo Romero (Sweden) Peter Sundberg	(Spain) Lucas Guerrero (Spain) José Manuel Pérez-Aicart	(Italy) Giuseppe Arlotti (Italy) Fabrizio Gini	(Turkey) Vural Ak (Turkey) Ahmet Özgün
4	R2	(Turkey) Istanbul Park, Istanbul	24 September	(Spain) No. 2 Esc. Bengala	(Spain) No. 2 Esc. Bengala	(Spain) No. 43 Roger Racing	(Italy) No. 27 Racing Box
4	R2	(Turkey) Istanbul Park, Istanbul	24 September	(Spain) Lucas Guerrero (Spain) José Manuel Pérez-Aicart	(Spain) Lucas Guerrero (Spain) José Manuel Pérez-Aicart	(Spain) Ángel Santos (Netherlands) Henk van Zoest	(Turkey) Vural Ak (Turkey) Ahmet Özgün
5	R1	(Spain) Circuit Ricardo Tormo, Cheste	7 October	(Italy) No. 4 GPC Sport	(Italy) No. 58 Victory Engineering	(Spain) No. 42 Roger Racing	(Italy) No. 29 Racing Box
5	R1	(Spain) Circuit Ricardo Tormo, Cheste	7 October	(Italy) Marco Lambertini (Italy) Andrea Montermini	(France) Damien Pasini (Italy) Maurizio Mediani	(Spain) Antonio Castro (Spain) Santiago García	(Italy) Marco Cioci (Italy) Piergiuseppe Perazzini
5	R2	(Spain) Circuit Ricardo Tormo, Cheste	8 October	(Italy) No. 52 Esc. Roger Racing	(Italy) No. 4 GPC Sport	(Spain) No. 61 Santiago García	(Italy) No. 27 Racing Box
5	R2	(Spain) Circuit Ricardo Tormo, Cheste	8 October	(Spain) Javier Díaz (Spain) Santiago Puig	(Italy) Marco Lambertini (Italy) Andrea Montermini	(Spain) Antonio Castro (Spain) Santiago García	(Italy) Andrea Belicchi (Italy) Stefano Zonca
6	R	(Spain) Circuit de Catalunya, Montmeló	12 November	(Italy) No. 36 Playteam SaraFree	(Italy) No. 36 Playteam SaraFree	(Netherlands) No. 38 Marcos Racing	(United Kingdom) No. 80 Damax
6	R	(Spain) Circuit de Catalunya, Montmeló	12 November	(Italy) Michele Bartyan (Italy) Alessandro Pier Guidi	(Italy) Michele Bartyan (Italy) Alessandro Pier Guidi	(Spain) Pedro Névoa (Netherlands) Fred van Putten	(United Kingdom) Jonathan Lang (United Kingdom) Martin Rich
