= Richard Lietz =

Austrian racing driver (born 1983)

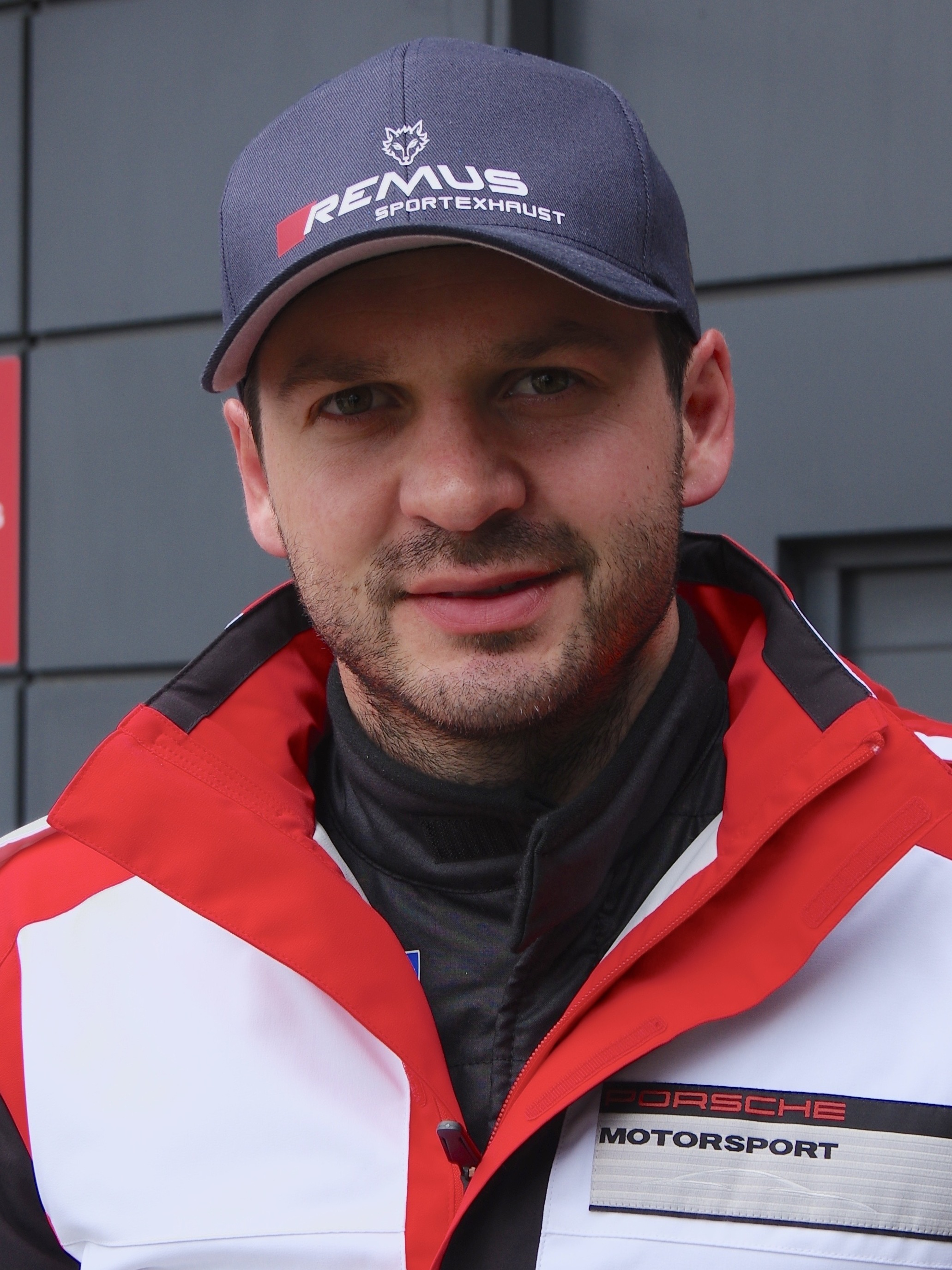
- Lietz in 2016
- Nationality: Austrian
- Born: 17 December 1983 (age 42) Waidhofen an der Ybbs, Austria

WEC career
- Debut season: 2012
- Current team: Manthey 1st Phorm
- Categorisation: FIA Platinum
- Car number: 92
- Former teams: Team Felbermayr-Proton, Dempsey-Proton Racing
- Starts: 100
- Wins: 16
- Poles: 9
- Fastest laps: 4
- Best finish: 1st in 2015, 2025

Championship titles
- 2007 2009, 2010 2015 2025: International GT Open; Le Mans Series - GT2; World Endurance Cup for GT Drivers; FIA Endurance Trophy for LMGT3 Drivers
24 Hours of Le Mans career
- Years: 2007 –
- Teams: IMSA Performance Matmut; Team Felbermayr-Proton; Porsche AG Team Manthey
- Best finish: 11th (2010)
- Class wins: 6 (2007, 2010, 2013, 2022, 2024, 2025)

Richard Lietz (born 17 December 1983 in Waidhofen an der Ybbs) is an Austrian professional racing driver and a Porsche Factory driver. He has competed in series such as American Le Mans Series, Formula 3 Euro Series and the Rolex Sports Car Series. He is also a multiple race-winner in Porsche Supercup. Lietz was overall series champion in the 2007 International GT Open season with Swiss driver Joël Camathias. He has won the GT2 class of the Le Mans Series twice, alongside German driver Marc Lieb in both in the 2009 and 2010 seasons.

Lietz won the 2012 24 Hours of Daytona GT division driving a Magnus Racing Porsche 911 GT3 Cup with co-drivers Andy Lally, Rene Rast and team owner John Potter. That same year, he would compete in the FIA World Endurance Championship with Team Felbermayr-Proton. In 2015, he was crowned World Endurance Champion for GT drivers, winning the title in a factory Manthey Porsche.

== Racing record ==
=== Career summary ===
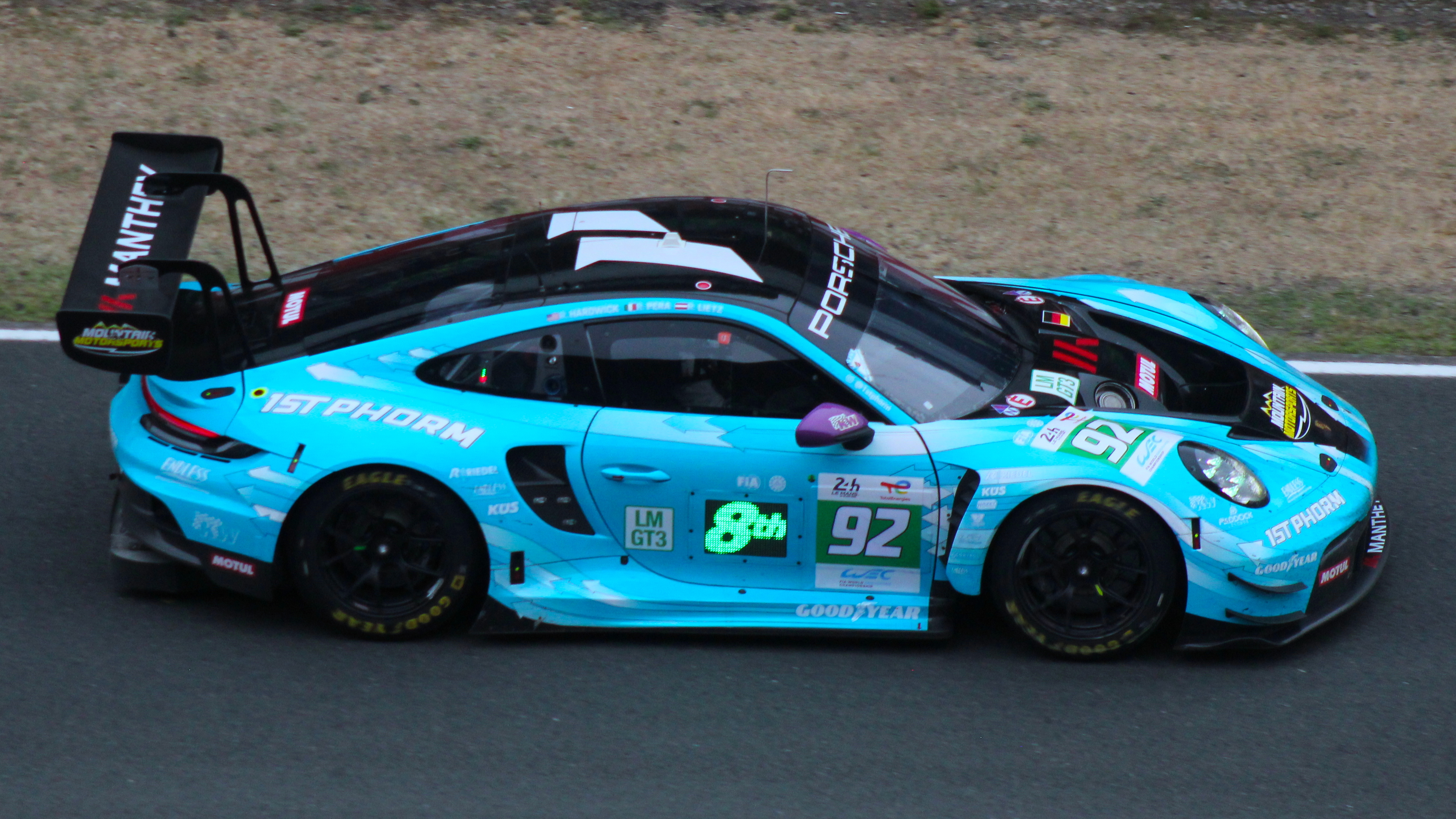
Leitz's class-winning No. 92 car at the 2025 24 Hours of Le Mans

| Season | Series | Team | Races | Wins | Poles | F/Laps | Podiums | Points | Position |
|---|---|---|---|---|---|---|---|---|---|
| 2000 | Formula BMW ADAC | ? | ? | ? | ? | ? | ? | ? | ? |
| 2001 | Formula BMW ADAC | CTS-Motorsport | ? | ? | ? | ? | ? | 122 | 6th |
| 2002 | German Formula Three Championship | Palfinger F3 Racing Team | 14 | 0 | 0 | 0 | 0 | 0 | 19th |
| 2003 | Formula 3 Euro Series | HBR Motorsport | 20 | 0 | 0 | 0 | 0 | 7 | 18th |
| 2004 | Porsche Supercup | Tolimit Motorsport | 4 | 0 | 0 | 0 | 0 | 0 | NC† |
| 2004 | Porsche Carrera Cup Germany | Tolimit Motorsport | 9 | 0 | 0 | 1 | 2 | 110 | 4th |
| 2005 | Porsche Supercup | Tolimit Motorsport | 13 | 1 | 0 | 1 | 1 | 130 | 5th |
| 2005 | Porsche Carrera Cup Germany | Tolimit Motorsport | 7 | 0 | 0 | 1 | 3 | 100 | **3rd** |
| 2006 | Porsche Supercup | Tolimit Motorsport | 12 | 2 | 4 | 4 | 5 | 157 | **3rd** |
| 2006 | Porsche Carrera Cup Germany | Tolimit Motorsport | 9 | 1 | 1 | 2 | 3 | 95 | 4th |
| 2007 | Le Mans Series – GT2 | IMSA Performance Matmut | 5 | 0 | 0 | 0 | 1 | 11 | 17th |
| 2007 | 24 Hours of Le Mans - GT2 | IMSA Performance Matmut | 1 | 1 | 0 | 0 | 1 | N/A | **1st** |
| 2007 | FIA GT Championships – GT2 | IMSA Performance Matmut | 1 | 0 | 0 | 0 | 1 | 13.5 | 17th |
| 2007 | International GT Open | Autorlando | 15 | 3 | 3 | ? | 6 | 158 | **1st** |
| 2007 | Rolex Sports Car Series - GT | Synergy Racing | 1 | 0 | 0 | 0 | 0 | 20 | 115th |
| 2008 | Le Mans Series – GT2 | IMSA Performance Matmut | 5 | 0 | 0 | 0 | 2 | 15 | 9th |
| 2008 | 24 Hours of Le Mans - GT2 | IMSA Performance Matmut | 1 | 0 | 0 | 0 | 0 | N/A | DNF |
| 2008 | FIA GT Championships – GT2 | IMSA Performance Matmut | 1 | 0 | 0 | 0 | 0 | 4.5 | 28th |
| 2008 | FIA GT Championships – GT2 | Team Felbermayr-Proton | 1 | 0 | 0 | 0 | 0 | 4.5 | 28th |
| 2008 | American Le Mans Series - GT2 | Flying Lizard Motorsports | 1 | 0 | 0 | 0 | 0 | 13 | 47th |
| 2008 | Rolex Sports Car Series - GT | Synergy Racing | 1 | 0 | 0 | 0 | 0 | 8 | 156th |
| 2008 | International GT Open | Autorlando | 16 | 4 | ? | ? | ? | 169 | **2nd** |
| 2009 | Le Mans Series – GT2 | Team Felbermayr-Proton | 5 | 3 | 0 | 0 | 3 | 36 | **1st** |
| 2009 | 24 Hours of Le Mans - GT2 | Team Felbermayr-Proton | 1 | 0 | 0 | 0 | 0 | N/A | DNF |
| 2009 | American Le Mans Series - GT2 | Farnbacher-Loles Motorsports | 1 | 0 | 0 | 0 | 0 | 13 | 42nd |
| 2009 | Rolex Sports Car Series - GT | Farnbacher-Loles Racing | 1 | 0 | 0 | 0 | 1 | 32 | 53rd |
| 2009 | International GT Open - Super GT | Autorlando Sport | 16 | 2 | ? | ? | 11 | 94 | **2nd** |
| 2009 | 24 Hours of Nürburgring - SP9 | Manthey Racing | 1 | 0 | 0 | 0 | 1 | N/A | **2nd** |
| 2010 | Le Mans Series – GT2 | Team Felbermayr-Proton | 5 | 3 | 0 | 0 | 4 | 87 | **1st** |
| 2010 | 24 Hours of Le Mans - GT2 | Team Felbermayr-Proton | 1 | 1 | 0 | 0 | 1 | N/A | **1st** |
| 2010 | American Le Mans Series - GT | Flying Lizard Motorsports | 1 | 0 | 0 | 0 | 0 | 18 | 29th |
| 2010 | Rolex Sports Car Series - GT | Magnus Racing | 1 | 0 | 0 | 0 | 1 | 26 | 61st |
| 2010 | International GT Open - Super GT | Autorlando Sport | 16 | 2 | ? | ? | 7 | 82 | **2nd** |
| 2010 | 24 Hours of Nürburgring - E1-XP Hybrid | Manthey Racing | 1 | 0 | 0 | 0 | 0 | N/A | DNF |
| 2011 | Le Mans Series – GTE Pro | Team Felbermayr-Proton | 5 | 0 | 0 | 0 | 3 | 45 | 9th |
| 2011 | 24 Hours of Le Mans - LMGTE Pro | Team Felbermayr-Proton | 1 | 0 | 0 | 0 | 0 | N/A | 4th |
| 2011 | American Le Mans Series - GT | Porsche Motorsport North America | 1 | 1 | 0 | 0 | 1 | 0 | NC† |
| 2011 | Rolex Sports Car Series - GT | Magnus Racing | 1 | 0 | 0 | 0 | 0 | 1 | 63rd |
| 2011 | 24 Hours of Nürburgring - E1-XP Hybrid | Manthey Racing | 1 | 1 | 0 | 0 | 1 | N/A | **1st** |
| 2012 | FIA World Endurance Championship - LMGTE Pro | Team Felbermayr-Proton | 8 | 2 | 0 | 0 | 7 | 5.5 | 39th |
| 2012 | 24 Hours of Le Mans - LMGTE Pro | Team Felbermayr-Proton | 1 | 0 | 0 | 0 | 0 | N/A | DNF |
| 2012 | American Le Mans Series - GT | Porsche Motorsport North America | 1 | 0 | 0 | 0 | 0 | 5 | 29th |
| 2012 | American Le Mans Series - GT | Paul Miller Racing | 1 | 0 | 0 | 0 | 0 | 5 | 29th |
| 2012 | Rolex Sports Car Series - GT | Magnus Racing | 1 | 1 | 0 | 0 | 1 | 35 | 49th |
| 2012 | 24 Hours of Nürburgring - SP9 | Manthey Racing | 1 | 0 | 0 | 0 | 0 | N/A | DNF |
| 2013 | FIA World Endurance Championship - LMGTE Pro | Porsche AG Team Manthey | 8 | 1 | 0 | 0 | 1 | 123 | 4th |
| 2013 | 24 Hours of Le Mans - LMGTE Pro | Porsche AG Team Manthey | 1 | 1 | 0 | 0 | 1 | N/A | **1st** |
| 2013 | American Le Mans Series - GT | Paul Miller Racing | 1 | 0 | 0 | 0 | 0 | 10 | 27th |
| 2013 | Rolex Sports Car Series - GT | Magnus Racing | 2 | 0 | 0 | 0 | 1 | 79 | 19th |
| 2013 | Rolex Sports Car Series - GT | Mühlner Motorsport | 1 | 0 | 0 | 0 | 0 | 79 | 19th |
| 2013 | Blancpain Endurance Series - Pro | Manthey Racing | 8 | 1 | 0 | 0 | 1 | 39 | 6th |
| 2013 | 24 Hours of Nürburgring - SP9 | Manthey Racing | 1 | 0 | 0 | 0 | 0 | N/A | DNF |
| 2014 | United SportsCar Championship - GTLM | Porsche North America | 8 | 1 | 0 | 0 | 1 | 210 | 15th |
| 2014 | European Le Mans Series – LMGTE | Proton Competition | 1 | 0 | 0 | 0 | 0 | 0.5 | 27th |
| 2014 | FIA World Endurance Championship - LMGTE Pro | Porsche Team Manthey | 6 | 1 | 0 | 0 | 3 | 111 | **3rd** |
| 2014 | 24 Hours of Le Mans - LMGTE Pro | Porsche Team Manthey | 1 | 0 | 0 | 0 | 1 | N/A | **3rd** |
| 2015 | United SportsCar Championship - GTLM | Porsche North America | 3 | 1 | 0 | 0 | 0 | 87 | 14th |
| 2015 | European Le Mans Series – LMGTE | Proton Competition | 4 | 0 | 0 | 0 | 1 | 45 | 9th |
| 2015 | FIA World Endurance Championship - LMGTE Pro | Porsche Team Manthey | 8 | 3 | 0 | 0 | 5 | 145 | **1st** |
| 2015 | 24 Hours of Le Mans - LMGTE Pro | Porsche Team Manthey | 1 | 0 | 0 | 0 | 0 | N/A | 5th |
| 2016 | IMSA SportsCar Championship - GTLM | Porsche North America | 1 | 0 | 0 | 0 | 0 | 22 | 29th |
| 2016 | European Le Mans Series – LMGTE | Proton Competition | 1 | 0 | 0 | 1 | 0 | 8 | 19th |
| 2016 | FIA World Endurance Championship - LMGTE Pro | Dempsey-Proton Racing | 9 | 0 | 0 | 0 | 0 | 74 | 8th |
| 2016 | 24 Hours of Le Mans - LMGTE Pro | Dempsey-Proton Racing | 1 | 0 | 0 | 0 | 0 | N/A | 8th |
| 2016 | 24 Hours of Nürburgring - SP9 | Manthey Racing | 1 | 0 | 0 | 0 | 0 | N/A | DNF |
| 2017 | IMSA SportsCar Championship - GTLM | Porsche GT Team | 2 | 0 | 0 | 0 | 0 | 48 | 21st |
| 2017 | FIA World Endurance Championship – LMGTE Pro | Porsche GT Team | 9 | 0 | 1 | 0 | 5 | 145 | **2nd** |
| 2017 | 24 Hours of Le Mans - LMGTE Pro | Porsche GT Team | 1 | 0 | 0 | 0 | 0 | N/A | 4th |
| 2017 | 24 Hours of Nürburgring - SP9 | Manthey Racing | 1 | 0 | 0 | 0 | 0 | N/A | DNF |
| 2018 | 24 Hours of Le Mans - LMGTE Pro | Porsche GT Team | 1 | 0 | 1 | 0 | 1 | N/A | **2nd** |
| 2018 | 24 Hours of Nürburgring - SP9 | Manthey Racing | 1 | 1 | 0 | 0 | 1 | N/A | **1st** |
| 2018–19 | FIA World Endurance Championship – LMGTE Pro | Porsche GT Team | 8 | 1 | 0 | 0 | 4 | 131 | **3rd** |
| 2019 | Blancpain GT Series Endurance Cup | GPX Racing | 1 | 1 | 0 | 0 | 1 | 25 | 10th |
| 2019 | 24 Hours of Le Mans - LMGTE Pro | Porsche GT Team | 1 | 0 | 0 | 0 | 1 | N/A | **2nd** |
| 2019 | 24 Hours of Nürburgring - SP9 | Manthey Racing | 1 | 0 | 0 | 0 | 0 | N/A | DNF |
| 2019–20 | FIA World Endurance Championship – LMGTE Pro | Porsche GT Team | 8 | 1 | 2 | 0 | 3 | 111 | 7th |
| 2020 | European Le Mans Series – LMGTE | Proton Competition | 5 | 0 | 0 | 0 | 0 | 47 | 6th |
| 2020 | GT World Challenge Europe Endurance Cup | KCMG | 1 | 0 | 0 | 0 | 0 | 2 | 33rd |
| 2020 | 24 Hours of Le Mans - LMGTE Pro | Porsche GT Team | 1 | 0 | 1 | 0 | 0 | N/A | 5th |
| 2021 | IMSA SportsCar Championship - GTLM | WeatherTech Racing | 1 | 0 | 0 | 0 | 0 | 280 | 15th |
| 2021 | European Le Mans Series – LMGTE | Proton Competition | 6 | 0 | 0 | 0 | 1 | 61 | 5th |
| 2021 | FIA World Endurance Championship – LMGTE Pro | Porsche GT Team | 6 | 0 | 0 | 0 | 3 | 111 | **3rd** |
| 2021 | 24 Hours of Le Mans - LMGTE Pro | Porsche GT Team | 1 | 0 | 0 | 0 | 0 | N/A | 4th |
| 2021 | GT World Challenge Europe Endurance Cup | Rutronik Racing | 1 | 0 | 0 | 0 | 0 | 0 | NC |
| 2022 | IMSA SportsCar Championship - GTD | Wright Motorsports | 1 | 1 | 0 | 0 | 1 | 370 | 47th |
| 2022 | European Le Mans Series – LMGTE | Proton Competition | 6 | 0 | 0 | 0 | 1 | 35 | 14th |
| 2022 | FIA World Endurance Championship – LMGTE Pro | Porsche GT Team | 5 | 1 | 2 | 0 | 2 | 115 | 5th |
| 2022 | 24 Hours of Le Mans - LMGTE Pro | Porsche GT Team | 1 | 1 | 0 | 0 | 1 | N/A | **1st** |
| 2022 | GT World Challenge Europe Endurance Cup | GPX Martini Racing | 1 | 0 | 0 | 0 | 0 | 6 | 29th |
| 2023 | European Le Mans Series – LMGTE | Proton Competition | 6 | 0 | 0 | 0 | 1 | 22 | 13th |
| 2023 | 24 Hours of Le Mans - LMGTE Am | Proton Competition | 1 | 0 | 0 | 0 | 0 | N/A | DNF |
| 2023 | International GT Open | Lionspeed GP | 5 | 0 | 0 | 0 | 0 | 6 | 26th |
| 2024 | FIA World Endurance Championship – LMGT3 | Manthey EMA | 8 | 2 | 0 | 0 | 3 | 105 | **2nd** |
| 2024 | 24 Hours of Le Mans - LMGT3 | Manthey EMA | 1 | 1 | 0 | 0 | 1 | N/A | **1st** |
| 2024–25 | Asian Le Mans Series - GT | Manthey EMA | 6 | 1 | 0 | 0 | 3 | 76 | **2nd** |
| 2025 | FIA World Endurance Championship - LMGT3 | Manthey 1st Phorm | 8 | 2 | 0 | 0 | 2 | 123 | **1st** |
| 2025 | IMSA SportsCar Championship - GTD Pro | Proton Competition | 2 | 0 | 0 | 0 | 0 | 477 | 24th |
| 2025 | GT World Challenge Europe Endurance Cup | Pure Rxcing | 5 | 0 | 0 | 0 | 0 | 0 | NC |
| 2025 | Intercontinental GT Challenge | Pure Rxcing | 1 | 0 | 0 | 0 | 0 | 15 | 23rd |
| 2025 | Intercontinental GT Challenge | Absolute Racing | 1 | 0 | 0 | 0 | 1 | 15 | 23rd |
| 2025–26 | Asian Le Mans Series - GT | Manthey Racing | 6 | 0 | 0 | 0 | 0 | 38 | 10th |
| 2026 | IMSA SportsCar Championship - GTD | Manthey 1st Phorm | 2 | 1 | 0 | 0 | 1 | 553 | 52nd |
| 2026 | European Le Mans Series - LMGT3 | Proton Competition | 6 | 2 | 0 | 1 | 2 | 86 | **2nd** |
| 2026 | FIA World Endurance Championship - LMGT3 | The Bend Manthey | 8 | 2 | 0 | 1 | 5 | 99 | **3rd** |
| 2026–27 | Asian Le Mans Series - GT3 | Manthey Racing | | | | | | | |

†Not eligible for points.

=== Complete Formula 3 Euro Series results ===
(key) (Races in bold indicate pole position) (Races in italics indicate fastest lap)

| Year | Entrant | Chassis | Engine | 1 | 2 | 3 | 4 | 5 | 6 | 7 | 8 | 9 | 10 | 11 | 12 | 13 | 14 | 15 | 16 | 17 | 18 | 19 | 20 | DC | Points |
|---|---|---|---|---|---|---|---|---|---|---|---|---|---|---|---|---|---|---|---|---|---|---|---|---|---|
| 2003 | HBR Motorsport | Dallara F302/030 | Opel | HOC; 1; 24 | HOC; 2; 15 | ADR; 1; 15 | ADR; 2; 8 | PAU; 1; 12 | PAU; 2; 9 | NOR; 1 Ret | NOR; 2; 19 | LMS; 1; 17 | LMS; 2; 21 | NÜR; 1 Ret | NÜR; 2; 5 | A1R; 1; 18 | A1R; 2 Ret | ZAN; 1; 19 | ZAN; 2; 17 | HOC; 1 Ret | HOC; 2; 12 | MAG; 1; 7 | MAG; 2 Ret | 18th | 7 |

=== Complete Porsche Supercup results ===
(key) (Races in bold indicate pole position) (Races in italics indicate fastest lap)

| Year | Team | Car | 1 | 2 | 3 | 4 | 5 | 6 | 7 | 8 | 9 | 10 | 11 | 12 | DC | Points |
|---|---|---|---|---|---|---|---|---|---|---|---|---|---|---|---|---|
| 2004 | Tolimit Motorsport | Porsche 996 GT3 | ITA | ESP | MON | GER | USA | USA | FRA | GBR | GER; 8 | HUN; 7 | BEL; 12 | ITA; 9 | NC‡ | 0‡ |
| 2005 | Tolimit Motorsport | Porsche 997 GT3 | ITA; 6 | ESP; 8 | MON; 5 | GER; 8 | USA; 5 | USA; 7 | FRA; 1 | GBR; Ret | GER; 5 | HUN; 6 | ITA; 21 | BEL; 6 | 5th | 130 |
| 2006 | Tolimit Motorsport | Porsche 997 GT3 | BHR; 8 | ITA; 11 | GER; 2 | **ESP**; 22 | **MON**; 1 | GBR; 3 | USA; Ret | USA; 4 | FRA; 2 | **GER**; 1 | HUN; 4 | **ITA**; 5 | 3rd | 157 |

‡ Not eligible for points.

=== 24 Hours of Le Mans results ===
| Year | Team | Co-drivers | Car | Class | Laps | Pos. | Class pos. |
|---|---|---|---|---|---|---|---|
| 2007 | (France) IMSA Performance Matmut | (France) Raymond Narac (United States) Patrick Long | Porsche 997 GT3-RSR | GT2 | 320 | 15th | **1st** |
| 2008 | (France) IMSA Performance Matmut | (France) Raymond Narac (United States) Patrick Long | Porsche 997 GT3-RSR | GT2 | 26 | DNF | DNF |
| 2009 | (Germany) Team Felbermayr-Proton | (Germany) Marc Lieb (Germany) Wolf Henzler | Porsche 997 GT3-RSR | GT2 | 24 | DNF | DNF |
| 2010 | (Germany) Team Felbermayr-Proton | (Germany) Marc Lieb (Germany) Wolf Henzler | Porsche 997 GT3-RSR | GT2 | 338 | 11th | **1st** |
| 2011 | (Germany) Team Felbermayr-Proton | (Germany) Marc Lieb (Germany) Wolf Henzler | Porsche 997 GT3-RSR | GTE; Pro | 312 | 16th | 4th |
| 2012 | (Germany) Team Felbermayr-Proton | (Germany) Marc Lieb (Germany) Wolf Henzler | Porsche 997 GT3-RSR | GTE; Pro | 184 | DNF | DNF |
| 2013 | (Germany) Porsche AG Team Manthey | (France) Romain Dumas (Germany) Marc Lieb | Porsche 911 RSR | GTE; Pro | 315 | 15th | **1st** |
| 2014 | (Germany) Porsche Team Manthey | (Germany) Marco Holzer (France) Frédéric Makowiecki | Porsche 911 RSR | GTE; Pro | 337 | 15th | **3rd** |
| 2015 | (Germany) Porsche Team Manthey | (Denmark) Michael Christensen (Germany) Jörg Bergmeister | Porsche 911 RSR | GTE; Pro | 327 | 30th | 5th |
| 2016 | (Germany) Dempsey-Proton Racing | (Denmark) Michael Christensen (Austria) Philipp Eng | Porsche 911 RSR | GTE; Pro | 329 | 31st | 8th |
| 2017 | (Germany) Porsche GT Team | (France) Frédéric Makowiecki (France) Patrick Pilet | Porsche 911 RSR | GTE; Pro | 339 | 20th | 4th |
| 2018 | (Germany) Porsche GT Team | (Italy) Gianmaria Bruni (France) Frédéric Makowiecki | Porsche 911 RSR | GTE; Pro | 343 | 16th | **2nd** |
| 2019 | (Germany) Porsche GT Team | (Italy) Gianmaria Bruni (France) Frédéric Makowiecki | Porsche 911 RSR | GTE; Pro | 342 | 21st | **2nd** |
| 2020 | (Germany) Porsche GT Team | (Italy) Gianmaria Bruni (France) Frédéric Makowiecki | Porsche 911 RSR-19 | GTE; Pro | 335 | 31st | 5th |
| 2021 | (Germany) Porsche GT Team | (Italy) Gianmaria Bruni (France) Frédéric Makowiecki | Porsche 911 RSR-19 | GTE; Pro | 343 | 23rd | 4th |
| 2022 | (Germany) Porsche GT Team | (Italy) Gianmaria Bruni (France) Frédéric Makowiecki | Porsche 911 RSR-19 | GTE; Pro | 350 | 28th | **1st** |
| 2023 | (Germany) Proton Racing | (Republic of Ireland) Michael Fassbender (Estonia) Martin Rump | Porsche 911 RSR-19 | GTE; Am | 246 | DNF | DNF |
| 2024 | (Germany) Manthey EMA | (Netherlands) Morris Schuring (Australia) Yasser Shahin | Porsche 911 GT3 R (992) | LMGT3 | 281 | 27th | **1st** |
| 2025 | (Germany) Manthey 1st Phorm | (United States) Ryan Hardwick (Italy) Riccardo Pera | Porsche 911 GT3 R (992) | LMGT3 | 341 | 33rd | **1st** |
| 2026 | (Germany) The Bend Manthey | (Italy) Riccardo Pera (Australia) Yasser Shahin | Porsche 911 GT3 R (992.2) | LMGT3 | 330 | 45th | 13th |

=== Complete European Le Mans Series results ===
(key) (Races in bold indicate pole position; results in italics indicate fastest lap)

| Year | Entrant | Class | Chassis | Engine | 1 | 2 | 3 | 4 | 5 | 6 | Pos. | Points |
|---|---|---|---|---|---|---|---|---|---|---|---|---|
| 2007 | IMSA Performance Matmut | GT2 | Porsche 997 GT3-RSR | Porsche 3.8 L Flat-6 | **MNZ**; 6 | **VAL**; Ret | NÜR; 9 | SPA; Ret | SIL; 2 | INT | 17th | 11 |
| 2008 | IMSA Performance Matmut | GT2 | Porsche 997 GT3-RSR | Porsche 3.8 L Flat-6 | CAT; 3 | MNZ; DSQ | SPA; 6 | NÜR; 3 | SIL; Ret | | 9th | 15 |
| 2009 | Team Felbermayr-Proton | GT2 | Porsche 997 GT3-RSR | Porsche 4.0 L Flat-6 | CAT; 1 | **SPA**; 1 | **ALG**; 8 | NÜR; 1 | **SIL**; 7 | | 1st | 36 |
| 2010 | Team Felbermayr-Proton | GT2 | Porsche 997 GT3-RSR | Porsche 4.0 L Flat-6 | LEC; 1 | SPA; 1 | ALG; 3 | HUN; 1 | SIL; 5 | | 1st | 87 |
| 2011 | Team Felbermayr-Proton | LMGTE Pro | Porsche 997 GT3-RSR | Porsche 4.0 L Flat-6 | LEC; Ret | SPA; 8 | IMO; 3 | SIL; 3 | EST; 2 | | 3rd | 44 |
| 2014 | Proton Competition | LMGTE | Porsche 997 GT3-RSR | Porsche 4.0 L Flat-6 | SIL | IMO | RBR; 11 | LEC | EST | | 27th | 0.5 |
| 2015 | Proton Competition | LMGTE | Porsche 911 RSR | Porsche 4.0 L Flat-6 | SIL | IMO; 2 | RBR; 5 | LEC; 4 | **EST**; 8 | | 9th | 45 |
| 2016 | Proton Competition | LMGTE | Porsche 911 RSR | Porsche 4.0 L Flat-6 | SIL; 6 | IMO | RBR | LEC | SPA | EST | 19th | 8 |
| 2020 | Proton Competition | LMGTE | Porsche 911 RSR | Porsche 4.0 L Flat-6 | LEC; 7 | **SPA**; 4 | LEC; DNS | MNZ; 5 | ALG; 4 | | 6th | 47 |
| 2021 | Proton Competition | LMGTE | Porsche 911 RSR-19 | Porsche 4.2 L Flat-6 | CAT; 6 | RBR; 4 | LEC; 8 | MNZ; 7 | **SPA**; 4 | ALG; 2 | 5th | 61 |
| 2022 | Proton Competition | LMGTE | Porsche 911 RSR-19 | Porsche 4.2 L Flat-6 | LEC; 3 | IMO; 7 | MNZ; Ret | CAT; 8 | SPA; 7 | ALG; 8 | 14th | 35 |
| 2023 | Proton Competition | LMGTE | Porsche 911 RSR-19 | Porsche 4.2 L Flat-6 | CAT; 8 | LEC; 10 | ARA; 3 | SPA; Ret | ALG; 9 | ALG; 11 | 13th | 22 |
| 2026 | Proton Competition | LMGT3 | Porsche 911 GT3 R (992.2) | Porsche 4.2 L Flat-6 | CAT; 1 | LEC; 7 | IMO; 4 | SPA; 5 | SIL; 6 | ALG; 1 | 2nd | 86 |

=== Complete FIA World Endurance Championship results ===
(key) (Races in bold indicate pole position) (Races in italics indicate fastest lap)

| Year | Entrant | Class | Chassis | Engine | 1 | 2 | 3 | 4 | 5 | 6 | 7 | 8 | 9 | Rank | Points |
|---|---|---|---|---|---|---|---|---|---|---|---|---|---|---|---|
| 2012 | Team Felbermayr-Proton | LMGTE Pro | Porsche 997 GT3-RSR | Porsche M97/74 4.0 L Flat-6 | SEB; 2 | SPA; 1 | LMS; Ret | **SIL**; 3 | SÃO; 3 | BHR; 3 | **FUJ**; 1 | SHA; 2 | | 39th | 5.5 |
| 2013 | Porsche AG Team Manthey | LMGTE Pro | Porsche 911 RSR | Porsche M97/80 4.0 L Flat-6 | SIL; 4 | SPA; 5 | LMS; 1 | SÃO; 4 | COA; 4 | FUJ; 4 | SHA; 6 | BHR; 4 | | 4th | 123 |
| 2014 | Porsche Team Manthey | LMGTE Pro | Porsche 911 RSR | Porsche M97/80 4.0 L Flat-6 | SIL; 1 | SPA | LMS; 2 | COA | FUJ; 4 | SHA; 2 | BHR; 4 | SÃO; 6 | | 3rd | 111 |
| 2015 | Porsche Team Manthey | LMGTE Pro | Porsche 911 RSR | Porsche M97/80 4.0 L Flat-6 | SIL; 2 | SPA; 2 | LMS; 5 | NÜR; 1 | COA; 1 | FUJ; 4 | SHA; 1 | BHR; 5 | | 1st | 145 |
| 2016 | Dempsey-Proton Racing | LMGTE Pro | Porsche 911 RSR | Porsche M97/80 4.0 L Flat-6 | SIL; 9 | SPA; 4 | LMS; 6 | NÜR; 6 | MEX; 6 | COA; 6 | FUJ; 7 | SHA; 6 | BHR; 7 | 8th | 74 |
| 2017 | Porsche GT Team | LMGTE Pro | Porsche 911 RSR | Porsche M97/80 4.0 L Flat-6 | SIL; 3 | SPA; 5 | LMS; 3 | NÜR; 2 | MEX; 3 | COA; 6 | **FUJ**; 2 | SHA; 2 | BHR; 4 | 2nd | 145 |
| 2018–19 | Porsche GT Team | LMGTE Pro | Porsche 911 RSR | Porsche M97/80 4.0 L Flat-6 | SPA; 4 | **LMS**; 2 | SIL; DSQ | FUJ; 5 | SHA; 2 | SEB; 1 | SPA; 8 | LMS; 2 | | 3rd | 131 |
| 2019–20 | Porsche GT Team | LMGTE Pro | Porsche 911 RSR-19 | Porsche M97/80 4.2 L Flat-6 | SIL; 1 | **FUJ**; 6 | SHA; 3 | **BHR**; 5 | COA; 8 | SPA; 5 | **LMS**; 9 | BHR; 2 | | 7th | 111 |
| 2021 | Porsche GT Team | LMGTE Pro | Porsche 911 RSR-19 | Porsche M97/80 4.2 L Flat-6 | SPA; 4 | ALG; 4 | MNZ; 3 | LMS; 3 | BHR; 2 | BHR; 4 | | | | 3rd | 111 |
| 2022 | Porsche GT Team | LMGTE Pro | Porsche 911 RSR-19 | Porsche M97/80 4.2 L Flat-6 | SEB; 3 | **SPA**; 5 | LMS; 1 | MNZ | FUJ; 4 | **BHR**; 4 | | | | 5th | 115 |
| 2024 | Manthey EMA | LMGT3 | Porsche 911 GT3 R (992) | Porsche M97/80 4.2 L Flat-6 | QAT; 15 | IMO; 16 | SPA; 1 | LMS; 1 | SÃO; 12 | COA; 3 | FUJ; 14 | BHR; 5 | | 2nd | 105 |
| 2025 | Manthey 1st Phorm | LMGT3 | Porsche 911 GT3 R (992) | Porsche M97/80 4.2 L Flat-6 | QAT; 12 | IMO; 1 | SPA; 7 | LMS; 1 | SÃO; 6 | COA; 7 | FUJ; 5 | BHR; 4 | | 1st | 123 |
| 2026 | The Bend Manthey | LMGT3 | Porsche 911 GT3 R (992.2) | Porsche M97/80 4.2 L Flat-6 | IMO; 3 | SPA; 3 | LMS; 9 | SÃO; 3 | COA; 15 | FUJ; 12 | CAT; 1 | MNZ; 1 | | 3rd | 99 |

=== Complete IMSA SportsCar Championship results ===
(key) (Races in bold indicate pole position) (Races in italics indicate fastest lap)

| Year | Entrant | Class | Car | Engine | 1 | 2 | 3 | 4 | 5 | 6 | 7 | 8 | 9 | 10 | 11 | 12 | Rank | Points | Ref |
|---|---|---|---|---|---|---|---|---|---|---|---|---|---|---|---|---|---|---|---|
| 2014 | Porsche North America | GTLM | Porsche 911 RSR | Porsche 4.0 L Flat-6 | DAY; 1 | SEB; 9 | LBH; 4 | LGA; 9 | WGL; 5 | MOS; 5 | IMS; 10 | ELK; 10 | VIR | COA | PET | | 15th | 210 | |
| 2015 | Porsche North America | GTLM | Porsche 911 RSR | Porsche 4.0 L Flat-6 | DAY | SEB; 5 | LBH; 8 | LGA | WGL | MOS | ELK | VIR | COA | PET; 1 | | | 14th | 87 | |
| 2016 | Porsche North America | GTLM | Porsche 911 RSR | Porsche 4.0 L Flat-6 | DAY | SEB | LBH | LGA | WGL | MOS | LIM | ELK | VIR | COA | PET; 10 | | 29th | 22 | |
| 2017 | Porsche GT Team | GTLM | Porsche 911 RSR | Porsche 4.0 L Flat-6 | DAY; 6 | SEB; 8 | LBH | COA | WGL | MOS | LIM | ELK | VIR | LGA | PET | | 21st | 48 | |
| 2021 | WeatherTech Racing | GTLM | Porsche 911 RSR-19 | Porsche 4.2 L Flat-6 | DAY; 6 | SEB | DET | WGL | WGL | LIM | ELK | LGA | LBH | VIR | PET | | 15th | 280 | |
| 2022 | Wright Motorsports | GTD | Porsche 911 GT3 R | Porsche 4.0 L Flat-6 | DAY; 1 | SEB | LBH | LGA | MDO | DET | WGL | MOS | LIM | ELK | VIR | PET | 47th | 370 | |
| 2025 | Proton Competition | GTD Pro | Porsche 911 GT3 R (992) | Porsche 4.2 L Flat-6 | DAY; 10 | SEB; 8 | LGA | DET | WGL | MOS | ELK | VIR | IMS | PET | | | 24th | 477 | |
| 2026 | Manthey 1st Phorm | GTD | Porsche 911 GT3 R (992.2) | Porsche 4.2 L Flat-6 | DAY; 12 | SEB | LBH | LGA | WGL; 1 | MOS | ELK | VIR | IMS | PET | | | 52nd | 553 | |

=== Complete Asian Le Mans Series results ===
(key) (Races in bold indicate pole position) (Races in italics indicate fastest lap)

| Year | Team | Class | Car | Engine | 1 | 2 | 3 | 4 | 5 | 6 | Pos. | Points |
|---|---|---|---|---|---|---|---|---|---|---|---|---|
| 2024–25 | Manthey EMA | GT | Porsche 911 GT3 R (992) | Porsche 4.2 L Flat-6 | SEP; 1; 3 | SEP; 2; 13 | DUB; 1; 2 | DUB; 2; 5 | ABU; 1; 1 | ABU; 2; 7 | 2nd | 76 |
| 2025–26 | Manthey Racing | GT | Porsche 911 GT3 R (992) | Porsche 4.2 L Flat-6 | SEP; 1; 4 | SEP; 2; 8 | DUB; 1; 9 | DUB; 2; 4 | ABU; 1; 7 | ABU; 2; 12 | 10th | 38 |

Sporting positions
| Preceded by Michele Bartyan | International GT Open; Champion; 2007; With: Joël Camathias | Succeeded by Andrea Montermini; Michele Maceratesi |
| Preceded by Gianmaria Bruni; Toni Vilander | FIA World Endurance Cup for GT Drivers; Champion; 2015 | Succeeded by Nicki Thiim; Marco Sørensen |
| Preceded by Klaus Bachler; Alex Malykhin; Joel Sturm | FIA Endurance Trophy for LMGT3 Drivers; Champion; 2025; With: Riccardo Pera & Ryan Hardwick | Succeeded by Incumbent |
