= Joël Camathias =

Swiss race car driver

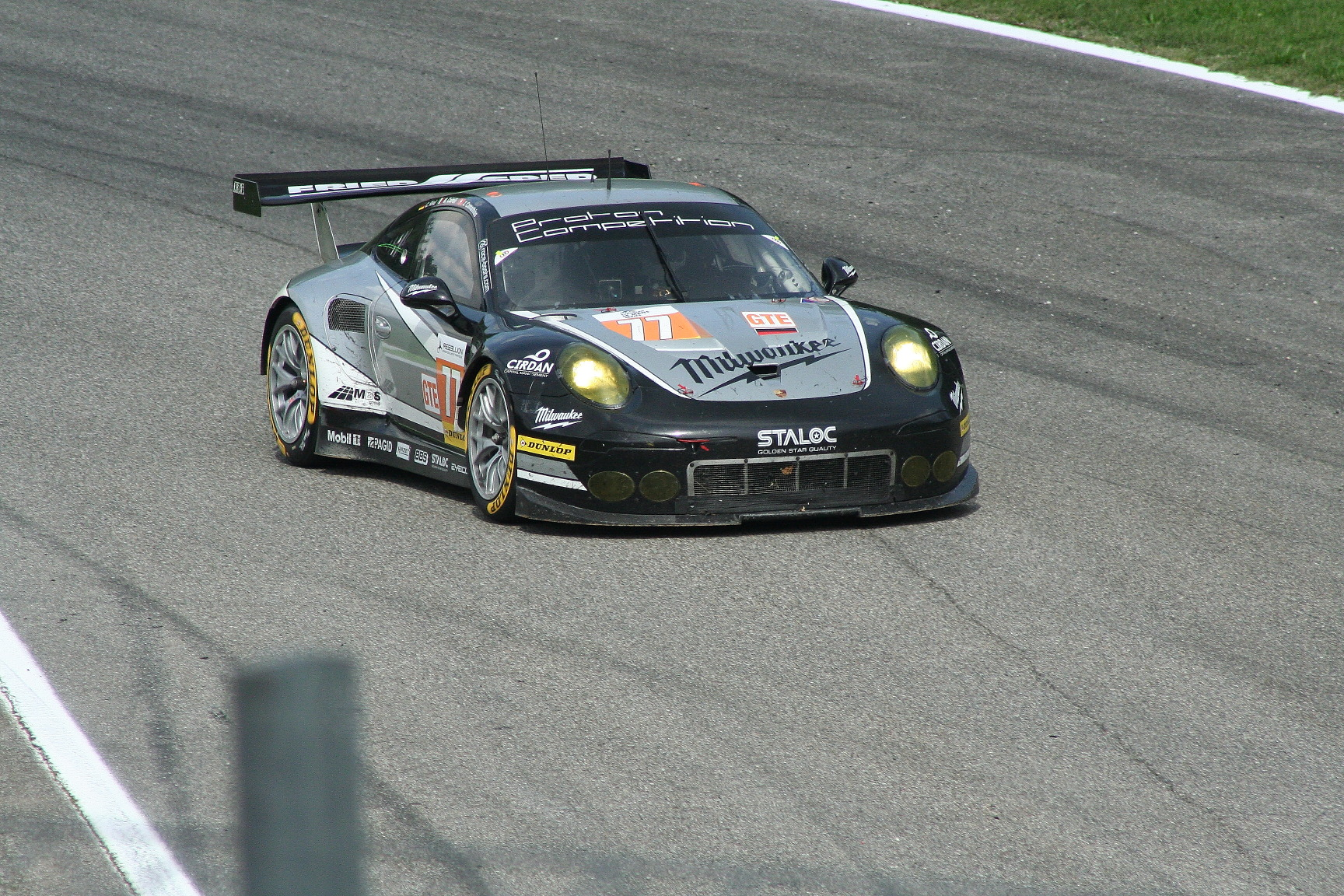
- Camathias' Proton Porsche in 2017
- Nationality: (Switzerland) Swiss
- Born: 9 February 1981 (age 45) Lugano, Switzerland
- Categorisation: FIA Gold (until 2012); FIA Silver (2013–)

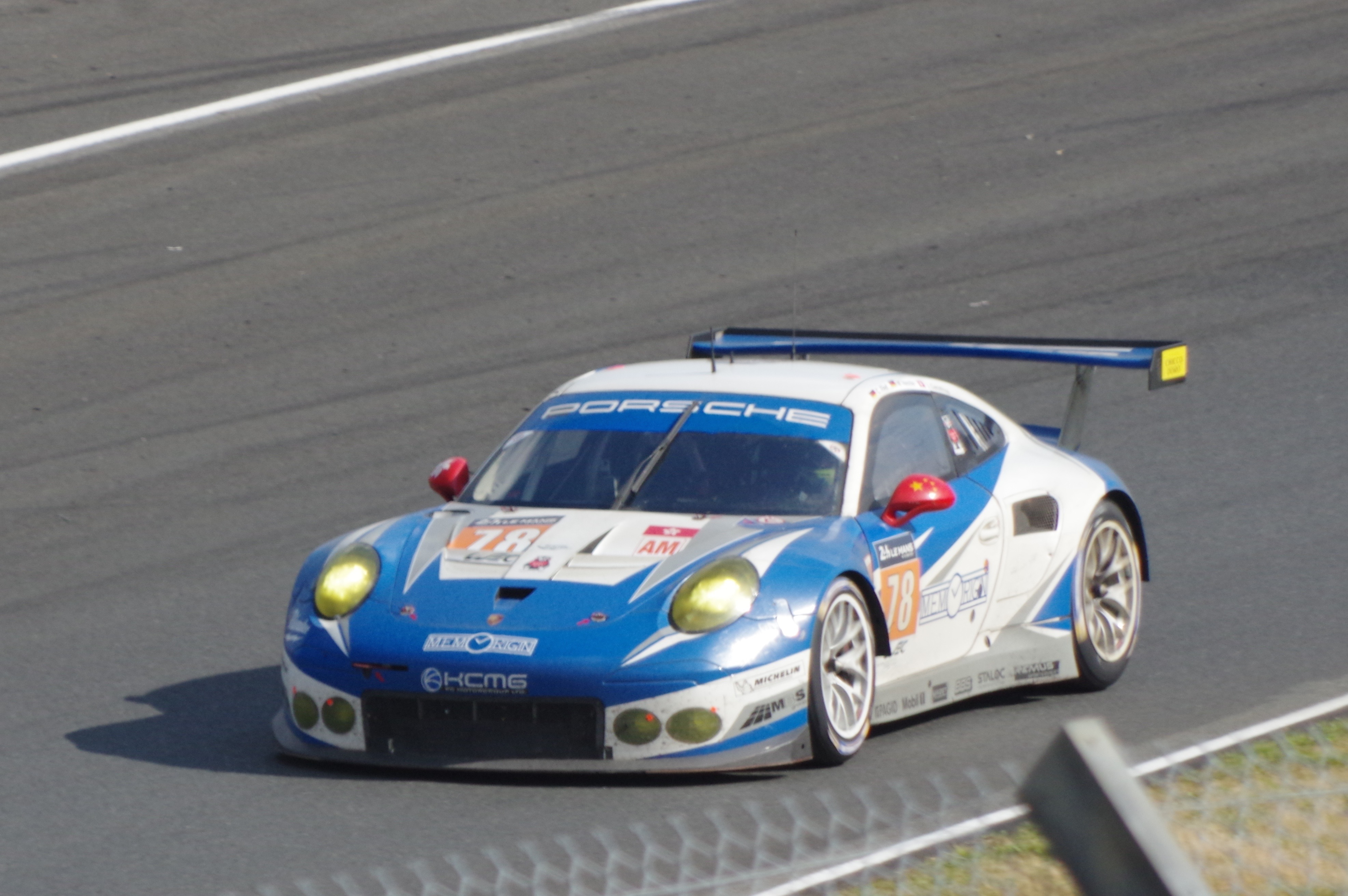
Camathias' KCMG Porsche at the 2016 Le Mans 24 Hours.

Joël Camathias (born 9 February 1981) is a Swiss race car driver born in Lugano. In 2001, he raced in the International Formula 3000 championship and in 2002 in the European F3000 series. In 2003, he made seven starts in the American Champ Car series for Dale Coyne Racing, his best finish a ninth in his debut at the Grand Prix of St. Petersburg. Having previously driven sports cars part-time, he then returned to Europe to drive in the Le Mans Series in 2004 and the FIA GT Championship in 2005 and 2006. He also won the GT2 Class of the 2006 Le Mans Series season with Marc Lieb driving a Porsche 911 for Autorlando Sport.

Camathias is the great-nephew of the late Florian Camathias, a solo motorcycle and sidecar racer, and his father Romeo was a car racer.

== Racing record ==
=== Complete International Formula 3000 results ===
(key) (Races in bold indicate pole position) (Races in italics indicate fastest lap)

Year	Entrant	1	2	3	4	5	6	7	8	9	10	11	12	DC	Points
2001	KTR	INT; 5	IMO; 15	CAT; 18	A1R; Ret	MON; Ret	NUR; 18	MAG; 17	SIL; 17	HOC; 9	HUN; 13	SPA; 15	MNZ; 15	17th	2

=== Complete Euro Formula 3000 Championship results ===
(key) (Races in bold indicate pole position) (Races in italics indicate fastest lap)

Year	Entrant	1	2	3	4	5	6	7	8	9	10	DC	Points
2002	Scuderia Famà	VLL; 17	NÜR; C	PER; Ret	MNZ; 10	DON; DNQ	SPA	BRN	DIJ	JER	CAG	28th	0

=== Complete CART results ===
(key)

Year	Team	No.	Chassis	Engine	1	2	3	4	5	6	7	8	9	10	11	12	13	14	15	16	17	18	19	Rank	Points	Ref
2003	Dale Coyne Racing	19	Lola B02/00	Ford XFE V8t	STP; 9	MTY; 11	LBH; 14	BRH; 13	LAU; 16	MIL; 15	LS; 13	POR	CLE	TOR	VAN	ROA	MDO	MTL	DEN	MIA	MXC	SRF	FON	**22nd**	**6**	

=== 24 Hours of Le Mans results ===
Year	Team	Co-Drivers	Car	Class	Laps	Pos.	Class Pos.
2012	(United Kingdom) JWA-Avila	(United Kingdom) Paul Daniels (Finland) Markus Palttala	Porsche 997 GT3-RSR	GTE; Am	290	33rd	8th
2016	(Hong Kong) KCMG	(Germany) Wolf Henzler (Germany) Christian Ried	Porsche 911 RSR	GTE; Am	300	41st	10th

Sporting positions
Preceded by Michele Bartyan	International GT Open champion 2007 with Richard Lietz	Succeeded by Andrea Montermini; Michele Maceratesi
Preceded by Andrea Montermini; Michele Maceratesi	International GT Open champion 2009 with Marcel Fässler	Succeeded by Álvaro Barba; Pierre Kaffer
