= International GT Open =

Autoracing series

- Category: Grand tourer sportscars
- Country: International
- Inaugural season: 2006
- Drivers: 60 (2020)
- Teams: 17 (2020)
- Tyre suppliers: Michelin
- Drivers' champion: (Hungary) Levente Révész
- Teams' champion: (Germany) Team Motopark
- Official website: www.gtopen.net/

The International GT Open is a grand tourer-style sports car racing series founded in 2006 by the Spanish GT Sport Organización. It was a spin-off of the now-defunct Spanish GT Championship, but is now a distinct series featuring FIA GT3-spec cars modified from production road cars.

== Format ==
The series consists of events in various European countries which feature two races over a weekend. In its first year, the races had an identical format to the Spanish GT Championship, with two 200 km races, the first held on Saturday and the second on the Sunday. Three of the six rounds were joint events for the Open and the Spanish GT Championship.

In 2007, the first race, known as Pro-Am, covers approximately 200 km distance, while the second race is 150 km and known as GT Open. The only exception is the Open GT Barcelona, which is a single 300 km race. In early seasons, a few races have been a part of the World Touring Car Championship support package.

Currently, the first race of a weekend is 70 minutes long and the second is 60 minutes. The support bill for the series contains the Euroformula Open Championship (formerly Spanish F3 Open) and the GT Cup Open Europe with some race weekends also featuring TCR Europe and the Alpine Elf Europa Cup.

Past support series have included the SEAT León Supercopa (2014–2016), and Formula V8 3.5 Series (2016).

== Regulations ==
Each race consists of a field of grand touring-style cars broken into different classes based on power and weight. For 2006, two classes were used, known as GTA and GTB. GTA was equivalent to the GT2 class used in the FIA GT Championship, but it also allowed non-homologated cars provide they obey the FIA GT2 technical regulations. Most of the field was made up of Ferrari F430 GTs and Porsche 911 GT3-RSRs. Non-homologated cars like the Mosler MT900R and the SEAT Cupra GT were also competitive.

The GTB class consisted of cars usually from a manufacturer's one-make cup series, like the Ferrari F430 Challenge, the Porsche 911 GT3 Cup, and the Marcos Mantis. A GTS class was created to house the FIA GT3 class, consisting mainly of Dodge Viper Competition Coupes and Lamborghini Gallardo GT3s.

Starting in 2015, the International GT Open began using only FIA GT3-spec cars with 2 sub-categories. The Am category is only for drivers given the "Bronze" designation by GT Sport. Pro-Am requires one Bronze driver with no restrictions on the co-driver. All other entries are scored overall with the only driver restriction being a ban on having two Platinum drivers.

== Circuits ==
- (Portugal) Algarve International Circuit (2009, 2011–2014, 2023–present)
- (United Kingdom) Brands Hatch (2007)
- (Spain) Circuit de Barcelona-Catalunya (2006–present)
- (France) Circuit de Nevers Magny-Cours (2006–2011)
- (Belgium) Circuit de Spa-Francorchamps (2008–present)
- (France) Circuit Paul Ricard (2012–2013, 2015–present)
- (Spain) Circuit Ricardo Tormo (2006–2008, 2010)
- (Spain) Circuito de Jerez (2013–2014)
- (Portugal) Circuito do Estoril (2006, 2008, 2015–2018, 2022)
- (United Kingdom) Donington Park (2009)
- (Germany) Hockenheimring (2019, 2024–2026)
- (Hungary) Hungaroring (2012, 2014, 2017–2018, 2020–present)
- (Italy) Imola Circuit (2009–2011, 2021)
- (Turkey) Istanbul Park (2006)
- (Italy) Misano World Circuit (2026–2027)
- (Italy) Monza Circuit (2006–present)
- (Germany) Motorsport Arena Oschersleben (2007)
- (Germany) Nürburgring (2010, 2012–2014)
- (Austria) Red Bull Ring (2011, 2015–2016, 2019–2025)
- (United Kingdom) Silverstone Circuit (2013–2019, 2027)
- (Spain) Valencia Street Circuit (2008)
- (Italy) Vallelunga Circuit (2007–2008)

== Champions ==
=== Current categories ===
==== Overall ====
Season	Drivers	Team	Tyre	Poles	Wins	Podiums	Points	Clinched	Margin
2006	(Italy) Michele Bartyan	(Italy) Playteam SaraFree	D	3	3	5	86	Race 11 of 11	4
2007	(Switzerland) Joël Camathias (Austria) Richard Lietz	(Italy) Autorlando	D	3	3	6	158	Race 15 of 15	4
2008	(Italy) Michele Maceratesi (Italy) Andrea Montermini	(Italy) Scuderia Playteam SaraFree	D	7	5	8	177	Race 16 of 16	8
2009	(Switzerland) Joël Camathias (Switzerland) Marcel Fässler	(Switzerland) Trottet Racing	D	3	6	9	233	Race 16 of 16	13
2010	(Spain) Álvaro Barba (Germany) Pierre Kaffer	(Italy) AF Corse	D	9	4	9	198	Race 16 of 16	5
2011	(France) Soheil Ayari	(Monaco) JMB Racing	D	0	4	8	199	Race 16 of 16	22
2012	(Italy) Gianmaria Bruni (Italy) Federico Leo	(Italy) AF Corse	D	3	3	7	233	Race 16 of 16	3
2013	(Italy) Andrea Montermini	(Italy) Scuderia Villorba Corse	D	5	6	14	231	Race 14 of 16	54
2014	(Russia) Roman Mavlanov (Italy) Daniel Zampieri	(Russia) SMP Racing Russian Bears	D	4	3	10	212	Race 16 of 16	10
2015	(Portugal) Álvaro Parente (Portugal) Miguel Ramos	(Spain) Teo Martín Motorsport	M	6	3	11	212	Race 13 of 14	33
2016	(Italy) Thomas Biagi (Italy) Fabrizio Crestani	(Italy) Orange 1 Team Lazarus	M	0	2	9	183	Race 12 of 14	51
2017	(Italy) Giovanni Venturini	(Italy) Imperiale Racing	M	3	3	6	114	Race 14 of 14	8
2018	(Denmark) Mikkel Mac	(United States) Luzich Racing	M	1	4	6	122	Race 14 of 14	11
2019	(Italy) Giacomo Altoè (Spain) Albert Costa	(Switzerland) Emil Frey Racing	M	4	4	6	128	Race 14 of 14	12
2020	(Portugal) Henrique Chaves (Portugal) Miguel Ramos	(Spain) Teo Martín Motorsport	M	1	2	6	114	Race 14 of 14	2
2021	(Denmark) Frederik Schandorff (Italy) Michele Beretta	(Italy) Vincenzo Sospiri Racing	M	1	4	10	151	Race 14 of 14	25
2022	(Italy) Leonardo Pulcini (Chile) Benjamín Hites	(Italy) Oregon Team	M	2	4	7	128	Race 13 of 13	3
2023	(United Kingdom) Charlie Fagg (United Kingdom) Samuel De Haan	(United Kingdom) Optimum Motorsport	M	1	2	5	119	Race 13 of 13	8
2024	(Germany) Christopher Haase (Austria) Simon Reicher	(Austria) Eastalent Racing	M	1	4	7	124	Race 13 of 14	16
2025	(Hungary) Levente Révész	(Germany) Team Motopark	M	1	4	7	142	Race 14 of 14	6
2026	(United Kingdom) Tom Emson (United Kingdom) Tom Lebbon	(United Kingdom) Elite Motorsport with Entire Race Engineering	M	3	5	8	148	Race 14 of 14	1

==== GT3 PRO-AM ====
Season	Drivers	Team	Tyre	Poles	Wins	Podiums	Points	Clinched	Margin
2015	(Portugal) Álvaro Parente (Portugal) Miguel Ramos	(Spain) Teo Martín Motorsport	M	6	3	11	94	Race 12 of 14	20
2016	(Italy) Thomas Biagi (Italy) Fabrizio Crestani	(Italy) Orange 1 Team Lazarus	M	3	1	8	78	Race 12 of 14	26
2017	(United Kingdom) Shaun Balfe (United Kingdom) Rob Bell	(United Kingdom) Balfe Motorsport	M	3	1	8	82	Race 12 of 14	17
2018	(United Kingdom) Tom Onslow-Cole (Germany) Valentin Pierburg	(Germany) SPS Automotive Performance	M	6	6	8	78	Race 14 of 14	0†
2019	(Denmark) Frederik Schandorff	(Italy) Vincenzo Sospiri Racing	M		4	8	79	Race 14 of 14	7
2020	(Brazil) Marcelo Hahn	(Spain) Teo Martín Motorsport	M	4	2	7	63	Race 14 of 14	1
2021	(United States) Brendan Iribe (United Kingdom) Ollie Millroy	(United Kingdom) Inception Racing	M		3			Race 13 of 14	
2022	(Poland) Karol Basz (Poland) Marcin Jedlinski	(Poland) Olimp Racing	M						
2023	(Italy) Eddie Cheever III (Italy) Marco Pulcini	(Italy) AF Corse	M		4	8	75	Race 13 of 13	7
2024	(Italy) Marco Pulcini	(Switzerland) Spirit of Race	M				95	Race 14 of 14	8
2025	(Austria) Dominik Baumann (Germany) Valentin Pierburg	(Germany) SPS Automotive Performance	M	2	2	9	98	Race 14 of 14	9
2026	(United Kingdom) Charles Bateman	(United Kingdom) Blackthorn	M	3	4	6	99	Race 14 of 14	3

^{†} Title won on number of wins count back.

==== GT3 AM ====
Season	Drivers	Team	Tyre	Poles	Wins	Podiums	Points	Clinched	Margin
2015	(Germany) Claudio Sdanewitsch	(Italy) AF Corse	M	2	5	12	55	Race 10 of 14	7
2016	(Portugal) António Coimbra (Portugal) Luís Silva	(Portugal) Sports & You	M	3	8	12	55	Race 12 of 14	19
2017	(Portugal) António Coimbra (Portugal) Luís Silva	(Portugal) Sports & You	M	0	4	10	49	Race 12 of 14	9
2018	(Brazil) Giulio Borlenghi (Poland) Andrzej Lewandowski	(Italy) Vincenzo Sospiri Racing	M	1	2	5	83	Race 12 of 14	22
2019	(Italy) Giuseppe Cipriani	(Italy) Antonelli MotorSport	M		3	11	45	Race 14 of 14	4
2020	(Germany) Jens Liebhauser (Germany) Florian Scholze	(Germany) GetSpeed Performance	M	5	7	9	67	Race 13 of 14	53
2021	(Italy) Giuseppe Cipriani	(Italy) Barone Rampante	M		3		47	Race 12 of 14	14
2022	(Austria) Alex Hrachowina (Austria) Martin Konrad	(Germany) Mann Filter Team Landgraf	M				108	Race 10 of 13	26
2023	(Germany) Heiko Neumann (Germany) Timo Rumpfkeil	(Germany) Team Motopark	M		3	8	78	Race 13 of 13	2
2024	(Italy) Giuseppe Cipriani	(Italy) Il Barone Rampante	M		3	12	114	Race 11 of 14	24
2025	(Switzerland) Gino Forgione (Italy) Michele Rugolo	(Italy) AF Corse	M	3	5	12	124	Race 14 of 14	2
2026	(Dominican Republic) Joel Monegro Reyes	(Switzerland) Fach Auto Tech	M	3	4	7	97	Race 14 of 14	5

=== Defunct categories ===
==== GTA ====
Season	Drivers	Team	Tyre	Poles	Wins	Podiums	Points	Clinched	Margin
2006	(Italy) Michele Bartyan	(Italy) Playteam SaraFree	D	3	3	5	86	Race 11 of 11	4
2007	(Italy) Michele Maceratesi (Italy) Andrea Montermini	(Italy) Scuderia Playteam SaraFree	D	2	3	5	65	Race 15 of 15	3
2008	(Italy) Michele Maceratesi (Italy) Andrea Montermini	(Italy) Scuderia Playteam SaraFree	D	6	5	8	77	Race 16 of 16	9

==== GTB ====
Season	Drivers	Team	Tyre	Poles	Wins	Podiums	Points	Clinched	Margin
2006	(Italy) Fabrizio Gini	(Italy) Scuderia Giudici	D	0	1	2	no data		
2007	(Italy) Gianni Giudici	(Italy) Scuderia Giudici	D	1	1	9	no data		

==== GTS ====
Season	Drivers	Team	Tyre	Poles	Wins	Podiums	Points	Clinched	Margin
2006	(Italy) Andrea Belicchi (Italy) Stefano Zonca	(Italy) Racing Box	D	5	4	8	no data		
2007	(Italy) Riccardo Romagnoli	(Italy) La Torre	D	3	3	5	no data		
2008	(Italy) Marco Cioci (Italy) Andrea Pellizzato	(Italy) Twentytwo	D	7	6	6	71	Race 14 of 16	20
2009	(Poland) Michał Broniszewski (Austria) Philipp Peter	(Switzerland) Kessel Racing	D	8	6	12	107	Race 14 of 16	27
2010	(Italy) Marco Frezza	(Switzerland) Kessel Racing	D	1	5	8	86	Race 16 of 16	2
2011	(Italy) Lorenzo Bontempelli (Italy) Stefano Gattuso	(Switzerland) Kessel Racing	D	6	7	12	116	Race 15 of 16	13
2012	(Italy) Michael Dalle Stelle (Italy) Daniel Zampieri	(Switzerland) Kessel Racing	D	5	3	10	88	Race 16 of 16	3
2013	(Italy) Giorgio Pantano	(Italy) Bhai Tech Racing	D	0	3	5	56	Race 16 of 16	0
2014	(Italy) Giorgio Roda	(Italy) AF Corse	D	0	2	7	86	Race 15 of 16	9

==== Super GT ====
Season	Drivers	Team	Tyre	Poles	Wins	Podiums	Points	Clinched	Margin
2009	(Switzerland) Joël Camathias (Switzerland) Marcel Fässler	(Switzerland) Trottet Racing	D	3	6	9	99	Race 16 of 16	5
2010	(Spain) Álvaro Barba (Germany) Pierre Kaffer	(Italy) AF Corse	D	9	4	9	90	Race 16 of 16	9
2011	(France) Soheil Ayari	(Monaco) JMB Racing	D	0	4	9	88	Race 16 of 16	9
2012	(Italy) Gianmaria Bruni (Italy) Federico Leo	(Italy) AF Corse	D	3	3	7	85	Race 16 of 16	1
2013	(Italy) Andrea Montermini	(Italy) Scuderia Villorba Corse	D	5	6	14	116	Race 14 of 16	22
2014	(Russia) Roman Mavlanov (Italy) Daniel Zampieri	(Russia) SMP Racing Russian Bears	D	4	3	10	104	Race 16 of 16	5

==== Gentleman’s Cup ====
Season	Drivers	Team	Tyre	Poles	Wins	Podiums	Points	Clinched	Margin
2013	(Belarus) Alexander Talkanitsa Sr.	(Austria) AT Racing	D	0	6	13	114	Race 14 of 16	22
2014	(Germany) Claudio Sdanewitsch	(Italy) AF Corse	D	0	5	15	128	Race 15 of 16	10

==== GT Open Cup ====
Season	Drivers	Team	Tyre	Poles	Wins	Podiums	Points	Clinched	Margin
2015	(United Kingdom) James Abbott	(United Kingdom) Radical Works	M	0	0	0	10	Race 6 of 14	0

=== Teams ===
Year	Teams' Cup	
2007	(Italy) Scuderia Playteam SaraFree	
2008	(Italy) Scuderia Playteam SaraFree	
	Super GT	GTS
2009	(Italy) Autorlando Sport	(Italy) Villois Racing
2010	(Italy) AF Corse	(Switzerland) Kessel Racing
2011	(Monaco) JMB Racing	(Switzerland) Kessel Racing
2012	(Italy) AF Corse	(Switzerland) Kessel Racing
2013	(Netherlands) V8 Racing	(Italy) Bhai Tech Racing
2014	(Netherlands) V8 Racing	(Italy) AF Corse
	Teams' Championship	
2015	(Italy) AF Corse	
2016	(Spain) BMW Team Teo Martín	
2017	(Italy) Imperiale Racing	
2018	(Italy) Imperiale Racing	
2019	(Switzerland) Emil Frey Racing	
2020	(Spain) Teo Martín Motorsport	
2021	(Italy) Vincenzo Sospiri Racing	
2022	(Italy) Oregon Team	
2023	(Austria) Eastalent Racing	
2024	(Italy) Oregon Team	
2025	(Germany) Team Motopark	
2026	(United Kingdom) Greystone GT	
