= GPC Sport =

(Italy) GPC Sport
- Founded: 2004
- Founder(s): Giampaolo Coppi
- Base: Milan, Germany
- Team principal(s): Batti Pregliasco
- Former series: FIA GT Championship; Italian GT Championship; European Le Mans Series; FIA GT3 European Championship; International GT Open; Speedcar Series

Squadra Corse G.P.C. srl, operating as GPC Sport, was an Italian auto racing team founded by Giampaolo Coppi as part of his GPC Group. The team raced with a close connection to Ferrari in various grand touring championships from 2004 to 2008. Coppi, formerly a sponsor and backer of the JB Racing (later JMB Racing) team through his Giesse corporation, decided to go his own direction in 2004 and launch his own racing team in the FIA GT Championship, later expanding to the Italian GT Championship, European Le Mans Series, and International GT Open. GPC Sport also represented Maserati in the FIA GT3 European Championship.

== History ==
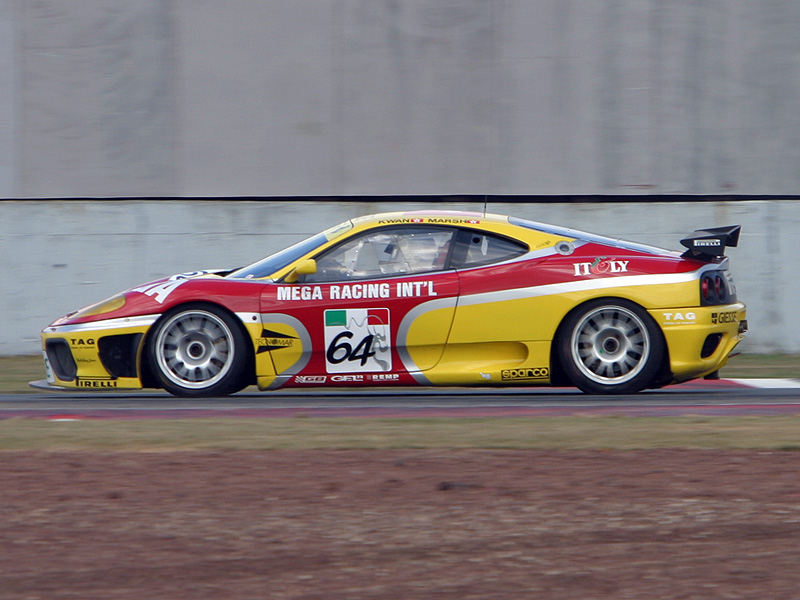
A Ferrari 360 GTC of GPC Sport in 2004

Purchasing two new Ferrari 575 GTCs as well as two Ferrari 360 GTCs, the team employed several former Grand Prix drivers including Emanuele Naspetti and Gianni Morbidelli. Christian Pescatori, Jaime Melo, and Fabrizio De Simone scored class victories with the 360s, while the 575s finished on the overall podium three times, including at the Spa 24 Hours, finishing second in the teams' championship. The operation was expanded for 2005, adding the Italian GT Championship alongside their FIA GT campaign with the 575s, as well as Le Mans Endurance Series and Italian GT for the teams' 360s. The FIA GT campaign earned only a single podium in each class after several retirements, while the Italian GT program had several programs throughout the season.

For 2006 GPC Sport abandoned their 575 program with Ferrari, instead investing in the new Ferrari F430 in the Le Mans Series as well as the new International GT Open series. Two class victories were earned in the Le Mans Series, including the first competition victory for the F430, as well as two overall wins in International GT. GPC also represented Maserati in the new FIA GT3 European Championship with the Maserati Trofeo Light. More victories came in 2007, a lone win in the Le Mans Series as well as two more wins in International GT Open. GPC Sport also had their only entry at the 24 Hours of Le Mans where their Ferrari retired. The team also sampled stock car racing with the Speedcar Series. The team trimmed down to just two entries in International GT in 2008 but were not victorious. Giampaolo Coppi would later go on to managing the Roma Racing Team after GPC Sport went bankrupt in 2008.
