= Scuderia Playteam =

(Italy) Scuderia Playteam
- Founded: 2003
- Team principal(s): Giambattista Giannoccaro
- Former series: Superleague Formula; FIA GT Championship

Scuderia Playteam (also known as Scuderia Playteam Sarafree) was an Italian racing team owned by Giambattista Giannoccaro.

== History ==
The team competed in several series. These included the FIA GT Championship in 2007 when the team finished 2nd overall using a Maserati MC12. This entitled them to enter the 2008 24 Hours of Le Mans but the team did not do so.

In the 2008 Superleague Formula season they operated the A.C. Milan and Galatasaray S.K. teams. They gained 8 podiums overall, and ex Formula One driver Robert Doornbos won 2 races. They did not return for the 2009 Superleague Formula season.

== Drivers ==
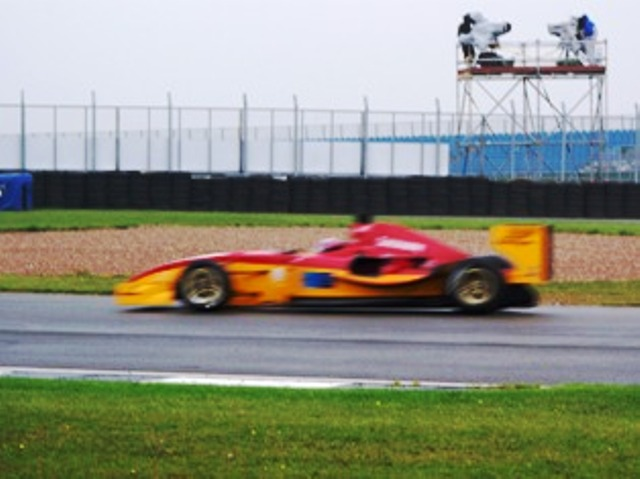
Alessandro Pier Guidi during the 2008 Donington Park weekend.

Drivers who made at least one race start for Scuderia Playteam include:

- (Italy) Andrea Bertolini
- (Italy) Andrea Piccini
- (Italy) Alessandro Pier Guidi
- (Italy) Fabrizio de Simone
- (Italy) Giambattista Giannoccaro
- (Italy) Max Busnelli
- (Germany) Alex Müller
- (Belgium) Yves Lambert
- (Italy) Andrea Montermini
- (Finland) Toni Vilander
- (Netherlands) Robert Doornbos

== Results ==
=== Superleague Formula ===
| Year | Car | Teams | Races | Wins | Poles | Fast laps | Points | T.C. |
|---|---|---|---|---|---|---|---|---|
| 2008 | Panoz-Menard | (Italy) A.C. Milan | 11 | 2 | 1 | 0 | 335 | 3rd |
| 2008 | Panoz-Menard | (Turkey) Galatasaray S.K. | 12 | 0 | 0 | 0 | 277 | 8th |
