= 2012 Formula Renault Italia =

Motor racing competition

2012 Formula Renault 2.0 Italia

Seasons
- ← 2011 none →

The 2012 Formula Renault 2.0 Italia season was the thirteen and final season of the Formula Renault 2.0 Italia Kevin Gilardoni won the competition, taking home eight wins. GSK Grand Prix won the team championship.

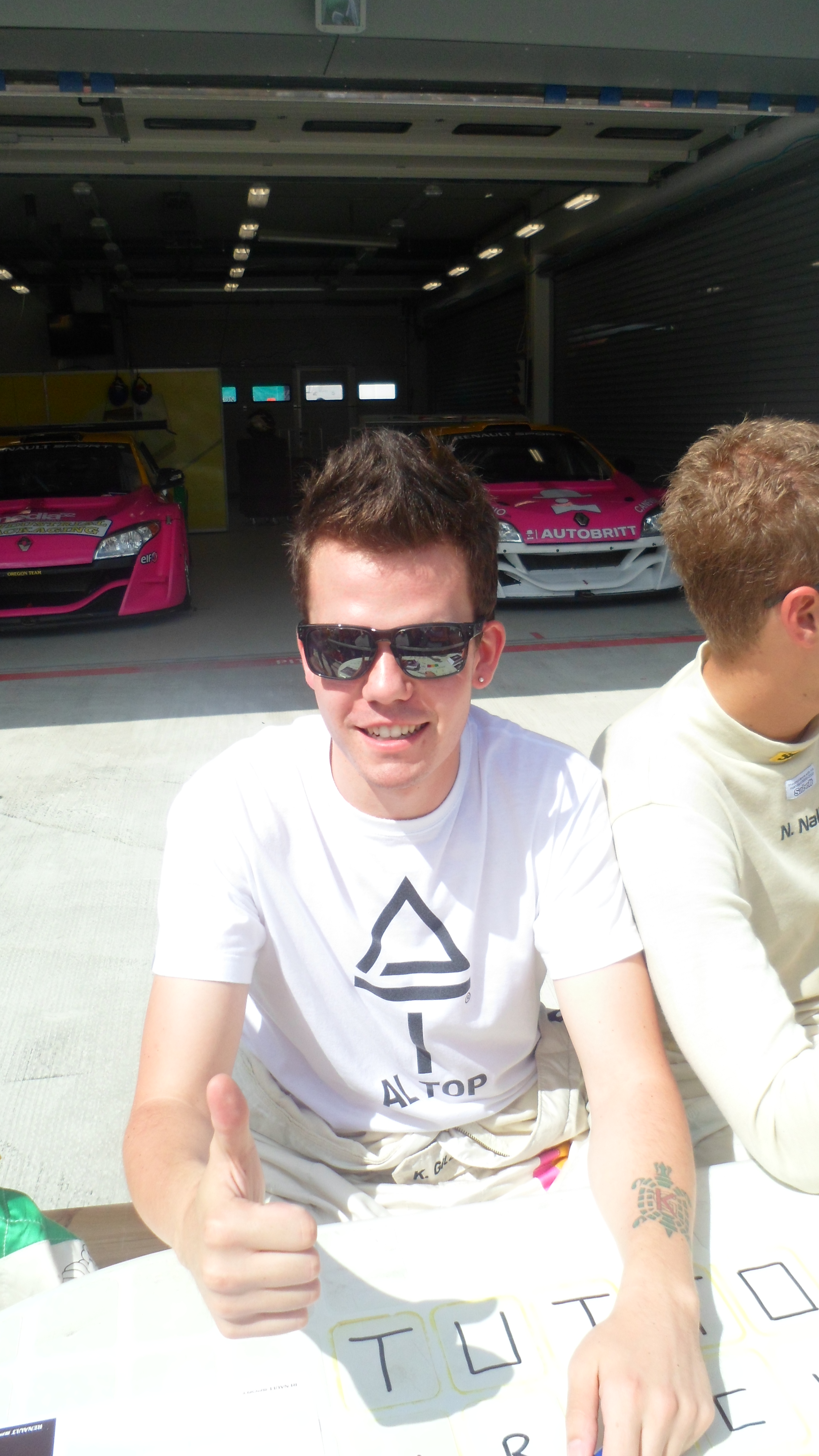
Kevin Gilardoni clinched the Formula Renault 2.0 Italia title with a round to spare.

== Drivers and Teams ==
2012 Entry List
Team	No.	Driver name	Rounds
(Italy) Viola Formula Racing	3	(Italy) Federico Gibbin	1
(Italy) Viola Formula Racing	11	(Italy) Daniele Cazzaniga	1-3, 5
(Italy) MLS Motorsport	5	(Italy) Lorenzo Riela	1-2
(Italy) TS Corse	6	(Italy) Marcus Ebner	3
(Italy) TS Corse	7	(Italy) Baldassarre Curatolo	1
(Italy) TS Corse	10	(Italy) Simone Gatto	1, 3
(Italy) TS Corse	73	(Italy) Pietro Peccenini	All
(Italy) Green Goblin by Facondini	8	(Italy) Giacomo Pollini	3-5
(Italy) Green Goblin by Facondini	15	(Russia) Ivan Taranov	4
(Italy) Green Goblin by Facondini	21	(Italy) Francesco Bracotti	All
(Italy) GSK Grand Prix	9	(Italy) Kevin Gilardoni	All
(Italy) GSK Grand Prix	25	(Italy) Nicolò Rocca	1-2
(Italy) GSK Grand Prix	51	(Italy) Matteo Pollini	1-5
(Italy) GSK Grand Prix	58	(Italy) Dario Orsini	All
(Italy) GSK Grand Prix	96	(Italy) Matteo Cairoli	5-6
(Italy) FTF Competizioni	11	(Italy) Daniele Cazzaniga	1-3, 5
(Italy) FTF Competizioni	12	(Italy) Nicola Cazzaniga	1
(Italy) FTF Competizioni	24	(Italy) Francesco Frisone	2
(Italy) FTF Competizioni	26	(Italy) Mirko Barletta	1-3, 5
(Croatia) Kreator Racing	14	(Croatia) Kristijan Habulin	All
(Italy) Team Torino Motorsport	27	(Italy) Dario Capitanio	All
(Italy) Team Torino Motorsport	53	(Italy) Lorenzo Paggi	All
(Italy) Team Torino Motorsport	55	(Italy) Luca Defendi	1-3
(Italy) Team Torino Motorsport	120	(Brazil) Marco Tulio	1-2
(Italy) Keks Motorsport	28	(Italy) Federico Porri	2

== Calendar ==
Round	Race	Circuit	Date	Pole position	Fastest lap	Winning driver	Winning team
1	R1	(Italy) Autodromo Nazionale Monza	March 25	(Italy) Federico Gibbin	(Italy) Baldassarre Curatolo	(Italy) Kevin Gilardoni	(Italy) GSK Grand Prix
1	R2	(Italy) Autodromo Nazionale Monza	March 25		(Italy) Baldassarre Curatolo	(Italy) Luca Defendi	(Italy) Team Torino Motorsport
2	R1	(Italy) Autodromo Enzo e Dino Ferrari	May 27	(Italy) Dario Orsini	(Italy) Francesco Bracotti	(Italy) Luca Defendi	(Italy) Team Torino Motorsport
2	R2	(Italy) Autodromo Enzo e Dino Ferrari	May 27		(Italy) Dario Capitanio	(Croatia) Kristijan Habulin	(Croatia) Kreator Racing
3	R1	(Italy) Misano World Circuit	July 22	(Italy) Kevin Gilardoni	(Italy) Kevin Gilardoni	(Italy) Luca Defendi	(Italy) Team Torino Motorsport
3	R2	(Italy) Misano World Circuit	July 22		(Italy) Kevin Gilardoni	(Italy) Kevin Gilardoni	(Italy) GSK Grand Prix
4	R1	(Austria) Red Bull Ring	September 2	(Italy) Kevin Gilardoni	(Italy) Dario Orsini	(Italy) Kevin Gilardoni	(Italy) GSK Grand Prix
4	R2	(Austria) Red Bull Ring	September 2		(Italy) Kevin Gilardoni	(Italy) Kevin Gilardoni	(Italy) GSK Grand Prix
5	R1	(Italy) ACI Vallelunga Circuit	September 23	(Italy) Kevin Gilardoni	(Italy) Kevin Gilardoni	(Italy) Kevin Gilardoni	(Italy) GSK Grand Prix
5	R2	(Italy) ACI Vallelunga Circuit	September 23		(Italy) Kevin Gilardoni	(Italy) Kevin Gilardoni	(Italy) GSK Grand Prix
6	R1	(Italy) Mugello Circuit	October 7	(Italy) Kevin Gilardoni	(Italy) Kevin Gilardoni	(Italy) Kevin Gilardoni	(Italy) GSK Grand Prix
6	R2	(Italy) Mugello Circuit	October 7		(Italy) Kevin Gilardoni	(Italy) Kevin Gilardoni	(Italy) GSK Grand Prix

== Championship standings ==
- Point system : 25, 18, 15, 12, 10, 8, 6, 4, 2, 1. In each race 1 point for Fastest lap and 1 for Pole position in race 1.
- Races : 2 race by rounds length of 25 minutes each.

=== Drivers ===
Pos	Driver	(Italy) MNZ		(Italy) IMO		(Italy) MIS		(Austria) RBR		(Italy) VLL		(Italy) MUG		Points
Pos	Driver	1	2	3	4	5	6	7	8	9	10	11	12	Points
1	(Italy) Kevin Gilardoni	1	2	Ret	4	2	1	1	1	1	1	1	1	259
2	(Croatia) Kristijan Habulin	5	6	3	1	3	3	3	2	Ret	7	4	5	149
3	(Italy) Dario Capitanio	6	13	6	2	4	8	6	Ret	2	6	2	2	124
4	(Italy) Dario Orsini	2	5	9	3	Ret	7	2	4	8	5	3	6	122
5	(Italy) Luca Defendi	Ret	1	1	Ret	1	2							93
6	(Italy) Lorenzo Paggi	8	11	8	8	9	9	7	6	4	2	5	4	86
7	(Italy) Francesco Bracotti	4	7	4	6	Ret	5	5	3	Ret	Ret	7	Ret	80
8	(Italy) Giacomo Pollini					5	4	4	5	3	4	DNS	DNS	71
9	(Italy) Mirko Barletta	Ret	3	2	10	Ret	6			5	3			68
10	(Italy) Pietro Peccenini	3	9	Ret	9	8	12	9	8	7	9	8	7	49
11	(Italy) Nicolò Rocca	Ret	4	7	5									30
12	(Italy) Matteo Pollini	9	10	Ret	Ret	Ret	11	8	7	6	8			25
13	(Italy) Matteo Cairoli									Ret	Ret	6	3	23
14	(Italy) Lorenzo Riela	7	Ret	10	11									9
15	(Italy) Simone Gatto	12	Ret			6	Ret							8
16	(Italy) Marcus Ebner					7	13							6
17	(Italy) Baldassarre Curatolo	11	8											6
18	(Italy) Daniele Cazzaniga			12	DNS	10	10			9	10			5
19	(Russia) Ivan Taranov							Ret	9					2
20	(Brazil) Marco Tulio	10	12	11	12									2
21	(Italy) Federico Gibbin	Ret	15											1
22	(Italy) Nicola Cazzaniga	Ret	14											0
	(Italy) Federico Porri			Ret	DNS									
Guest drivers ineligible for points.
	(Italy) Francesco Frisone			5	7									
