= 2012 Formula Renault seasons =

2012 Formula Renault

Seasons
- ← 2011 2013 →

This article describes all the 2012 seasons of Formula Renault series across the world.

== Formula Renault 2.0L ==
=== 2012 Formula Renault 2.0 Italia season ===
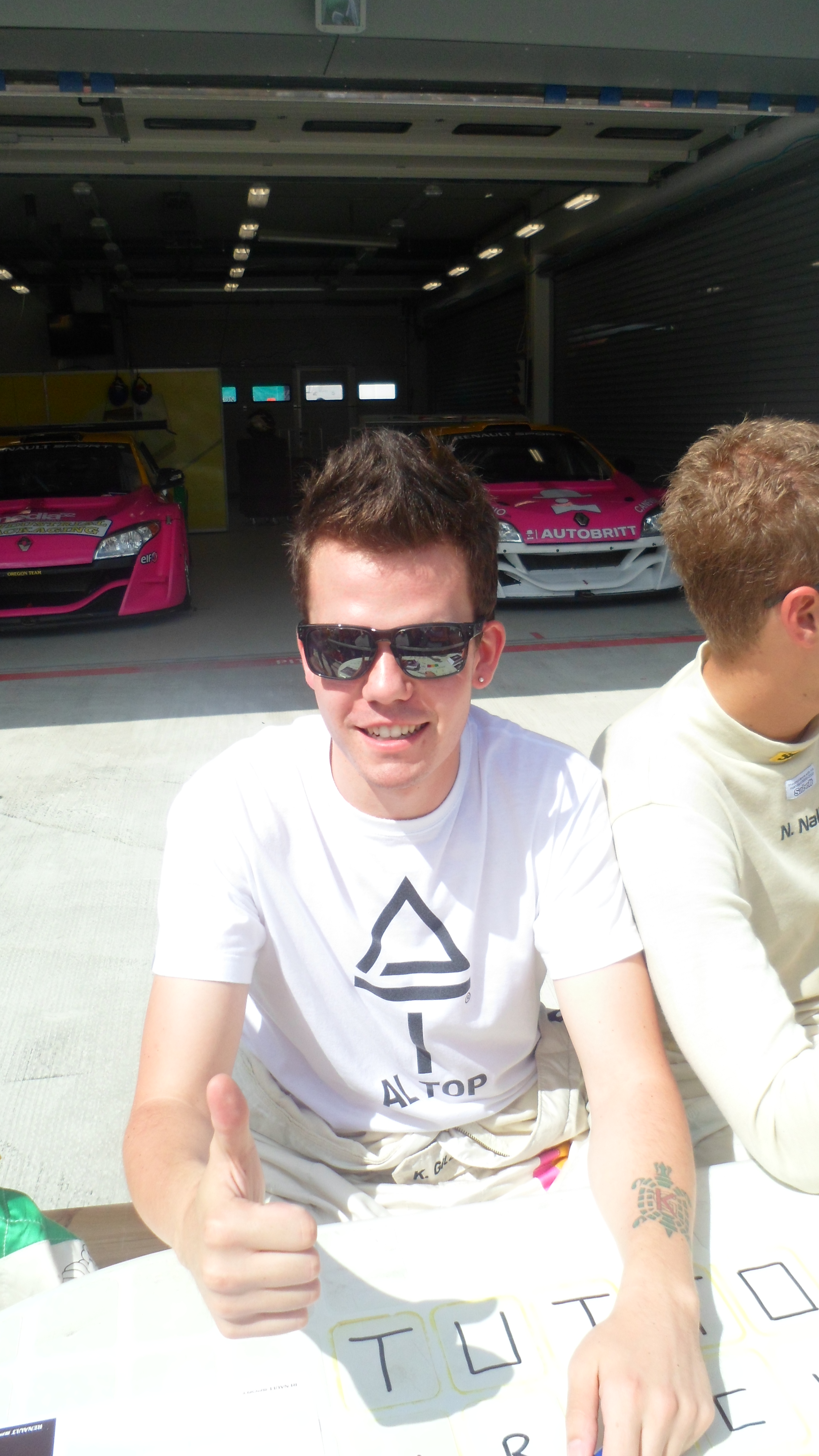
Kevin Gilardoni clinched the Formula Renault 2.0 Italia title with a round to spare.

- Point system : 25, 18, 15, 12, 10, 8, 6, 4, 2, 1. In each race 1 point for Fastest lap and 1 for Pole position in race 1.
- Races : 2 race by rounds length of 25 minutes each.

Pos	No.	Driver	Team	(Italy) Monza 25 March		(Italy) Imola 27 May		(Italy) Misano 22 July		(Austria) Red Bull Ring 2 September		(Italy) Vallelunga 23 September		(Italy) Mugello 7 October		Points
Pos	No.	Driver	Team	1	2	3	4	5	6	7	8	9	10	11	12	Points
1	9	(Italy) Kevin Gilardoni	GSK Grand Prix	1	2	Ret	4	2	1	1	1	1	1	1	1	259
2	14	(Croatia) Kristijan Habulin	Kreator Racing	5	6	3	1	3	3	3	2	Ret	7	4	5	149
3	27	(Italy) Dario Capitanio	Team Torino Motorsport	6	13	6	2	4	8	6	Ret	2	6	2	2	121
4	58	(Italy) Dario Orsini	GSK Grand Prix	2	5	9	3	Ret	7	2	4	8	5	3	6	120
5	55	(Italy) Luca Defendi	Team Torino Motorsport	Ret	1	1	Ret	1	2							93
6	53	(Italy) Lorenzo Paggi	Team Torino Motorsport	8	11	8	8	9	9	7	6	4	2	5	4	82
7	21	(Italy) Francesco Bracotti	Green Goblin by Facondini	4	7	4	6	Ret	5	5	3	Ret	Ret	7	Ret	80
8	8	(Italy) Giacomo Pollini	Green Goblin by Facondini					5	4	4	5	3	4	DNS	DNS	71
9	26	(Italy) Mirko Barletta	FTF Competizioni	Ret	3	2	10	Ret	6			5	3			67
10	73	(Italy) Pietro Peccenini	TS Corse	3	9	Ret	9	8	12	9	8	7	9	8	7	47
11	25	(Italy) Nicolò Rocca	GSK Grand Prix	Ret	4	7	5									28
12	51	(Italy) Matteo Pollini	GSK Grand prix	9	10	Ret	Ret	Ret	11	8	7	6	8			25
13	96	(Italy) Matteo Cairoli	GSK Grand Prix									Ret	Ret	6	3	23
14	24	(Italy) Francesco Frisone	FTF Competizioni			5	7									16
15	10	(Italy) Simone Gatto	TS Corse					6	Ret							8
16	5	(Italy) Lorenzo Riela	MLS Motorsport	7	Ret	10	11									7
17	6	(Italy) Marcus Ebner	TS Corse					7	13							6
18	7	(Italy) Baldassarre Curatolo	TS Corse	11	8											6
19	12	(Italy) Daniele Cazzaniga	FTF Competizioni			12	DNS	10	10			9	10			5
20	15	(Russia) Ivan Taranov	Green Goblin by Facondini							Ret	9					2
21	120	(Brazil) Marco Tulio Souza	Team Torino Motorsport	10	12	11	12									1
22	3	(Italy) Federico Gibbin	Viola Formula Racing	Ret	15											1
	28	(Italy) Federico Porri	Keks Motorsport			Ret	DNS									0

=== 2012 Asian Formula Renault Challenge season ===
- Point system : 30, 24, 20, 17, 15, 13, 11, 9, 7, 5, 4, 3, 2, 1 for 14th. No points for Fastest lap or Pole position. Drivers, that start their season at round 5 or later, don't receive any points for the final standing. The team point attribution is different from the driver point system : 10, 8, 6, 5, 4, 3, 2, 1.
- Races : 2 races by rounds.
- All races were held in China.

Pos	No.	Driver	Team	Zhuhai 17–18 March		Zhuhai 16–17 June		Zhuhai 15–16 September		Zhuhai 8–9 December		Points
Pos	No.	Driver	Team	1	2	3	4	5	6	7	8	Points
1	23	(Japan) Yosuke Yamazaki	Buzz Racing			1	1	1	2	1	2	168
2	22	(Japan) Satoshi Kosugi	Buzz Racing			2	4	2	1	2	1	149
3	95	(Hong Kong) Shaun Thong	FRD Racing Team	1	2	6	6	8	4	4	6	136
4	24	(Japan) Shigetomo Shimono	Hopewill Buzz Racing			3	3	3	3	3	3	120
5	3	(Hong Kong) Li Zhi Cong	Asia Racing Team	3	1	5	2					89
6	7	(South Korea) Im Che Won	KIM's Racing			Ret	5	Ret	8	6	5	52
7	8	(Hong Kong) Jimmy Chan	FRD Racing Team	Ret	5	9	11	9	6			46
8	18	(Taiwan) Roy Chiu	PTRS Racing Team	2	3							44
9	25	(Japan) Gaku Ishiyama	Hopewill Buzz Racing			Ret	10	4	5			37
10	11	(Taiwan) Jason Kang	KRC Racing					6	7	8	11	37
11	10	(United States) Pete Olson	Champ Motorsport			10	9	5	Ret	10	10	37
12	55	(Japan) Kei Yamaura	Hopewill Buzz Racing							5	4	32
13	2	(China) Yang Xi	Asia Racing Team			8	Ret	10	Ret	9	9	28
14	61	(China) Leo Ye	Privateer			4	8					26
15	15	(Indonesia) Alexandra Asmasoebrata	PS Racing			7	7			Ret	13	24
16	91	(Colombia) Julio Acosta	Champ Motorsport							7	7	22
17	77	(China) Zhang Yi Chun	PS Racing					7	9	Ret	Ret	18
18	6	(Hong Kong) Jacky Chan	FRD Racing Team	Ret	4							17
19	96	(China) Ben Li	Champ Motorsport							12	8	12
20	13	(Macau) Hermes Lai	FRD Racing Team							11	12	7
	21	(Spain) Guille Pintanel	Asia Racing Team			Ret	Ret					0

Pos	Team	Points
1	(Hong Kong) Buzz Racing	60
2	(China) FRD Racing Team	54
3	(Hong Kong) Hopewill Buzz Racing	46
4	(China) Asia Racing Team	34
5	(Hong Kong) Champ Motorsport	20
6	(China) PS Racing	17
7	(Hong Kong) KIM'S RACING	16
8	(Taiwan) PTRS Racing Team	14
9	(Taiwan) KRC Racing	13

== Other Formulas powered by Renault championships ==
=== 2012 GP2 Series seasons ===
The GP2 Series is powered by 4 litre Renault V8 engines and Pirelli tyres with a Dallara chassis.

=== 2012 Austria Formel Renault Cup season ===
The season will be probably held on 14 rounds in 7 venues in Czech Republic, Germany, France and Austria. The races occur with other categories: Austria Formula 3 Cup, Formelfrei and Formula 3,5L like (Renault 3,5L from World Series, Lola Cosworth). This section presents only the Austrian Formula Renault 2.0L classification.

- Point system : 20, 15, 12, 10, 8, 6, 4, 3, 2, 1 for 10th. No points for Fastest lap or Pole position.

Pos	Driver	Team	(Germany) Hockenheim 30–31 March		(Austria) Red Bull Ring 19–20 May		(Germany) Lausitzring 22–23 June		(Czech Republic) Most 4–5 August		(France) Dijon 8–9 September		(Germany) Lausitzring 29–30 September		(Germany) Hockenheim 14–15 October		Points
Pos	Driver	Team	1	2	3	4	5	6	7	8	9	10	11	12	13	14	Points
1	(Switzerland) Thomas Amweg	Equipe Bernoise	2	1	3	1	3	3	1	2	2	2			1	1	199
2	(Switzerland) Manuel Amweg	Equipe Bernoise	3	3	2	2	2	2	2	1	3	1			3	2	175
3	(Estonia) Marcus Lukas Kiisa	Scuderia Nordica	4	4	5	6	4	4	3	3	4	Ret	1	1	4	3	150
4	(Switzerland) Kurt Böhlen	Böhlen Motorsport	1	2	1	3					1	3			2	4	124
5	(Estonia) Karl Gustav Annus	Scuderia Nordica	9	9	9	9	5	6			5	4	2	3	5	Ret	77
6	(Estonia) Toomas Annus	Scuderia Nordica	8	10	8	8	Ret	5			6	5	3	2	6	5	71
7	(Germany) Hubertus Carlos-Vier	Equipe Bernoise			4	4	1	1	4	Ret							70
8	(Germany) Frank Altmeyer	Gregory Striebig	6	6	7	7	Ret	DNS									20
9	(Austria) Bernd Passler	PALU – Racing							5	4							18
10	(Germany) Bernd Suckow	Bernd Suckow	5	5													16
11	(Austria) Peter Grasser	Lammel Motorsport			6	6											14
12	(Austria) Gerd Lukas	PALU – Racing							6	5							14
13	(Germany) Dr. Ulrich Drechsler	Dr. Ulrich Drechsler							7	6							10
14	(Germany) Rene`Reinert	Rene`Reinert	7	7													8
15	(Germany) Frank Nowak	Frank Nowak	10	8													4

=== 2012 Formula Renault 2.0 Argentina season ===
All cars use Tito 02 chassis, all races were held in Argentina.

- Point system : 20, 15, 12, 10, 8, 6, 4, 3, 2, 1 for 10th. 1 point for Pole position. 1 extra point in each race for regularly qualified drivers.

Pos	Driver	Team	OCA 11 Mar	ROS 22 Apr	ZON 20 May	GRN 10 Jun	OBE 29 Jul	RAF 12 Aug	SAN 9 Sept	RIC 30 Sept	SFE 14 Oct	SAL 4 Nov	SLU 24-25 Nov		Points
1	(Argentina) Carlos Javier Merlo	Corsa Racing	1	3	16	4	1	?	3	1	2	1	4	3	158.5
2	(Argentina) Julián Santero	Castro Racing (?), Werner Racing (?)	7	14	1	6	5	?	1	4	3	4	1	1	135
3	(Argentina) Gianfranco Collino	Litoral Group	17	6	4	1	4	3	2	3	1	2	24		123
4	(Argentina) Marcos Muchiut	Werner Competición	3	4	9	20	14	?	?	2	4	5	6	9	86
5	(Argentina) Manuel Nicolas Luque	Litoral Group	8	11	21	8	12	?	?	5	22	3	2	2	75
6	(Argentina) Mario Gerbaldo	Litoral Group	23	25	2	2	2	?	?	10		6	20	4	72.5
7	(Argentina) Nicolás Cotignola	Schick Racing	6	1	8	3	3		?	23	8	9	13	10	68.5
8	(Argentina) Roberto Arato	JLS Motorsport	4	2	15	5	7	?	?	9	9	21	10	7	55
9	(Argentina) Matías Galetto	JLS Motorsport	9	16	3	7	6	1	?	18					53
10	(Argentina) Matias Daniel Vidal	Werner Competición	2	26	7	13	21		?	11	11	17	3	5	50
11	(Argentina) Emmanuel Cáceres	Caceres Competición	5	5	20		23	?	?	6	12	10	17	14	38
12	(Argentina) Miguel Calamari	Werner Competición	21	20	5	17	10	2	?	22	7	14	21	15	36.5
13	(Argentina) Amadis Farina	Bouvier Racing	11	12	6	11	8	?	?	13	20	12	7	24	26.5
14	(Argentina) Juan José Gárriz	Satorra Competición	24	23	14	12	24	?	?	8	6	7	8	22	26
15	(Argentina) Marcelo Ciarrocchi	Croizet Racing								7		18	5	6	22
16	(Argentina) Luciano Farroni	Satorra Competición	26	22	19	15	13	?	?	16	10	19	19	12	20.5
17	(Colombia) Juan David Lopez	JLS Motorsport	20	21	17	9	11	?	?	29	5	20	12	13	20
18	(Chile) Felipe Schmauk	Litoral Group	14	19	10	19	17	?	?	12	19	8	11	23	16
19	(Uruguay) Francisco Cammarota	Schick Racing	12	7			16	?	?	24	13	13			15
20	(Argentina) Guillermo Rey	Castro Racing	25	8			18	?	?	25	18		9	17	15
21	(Argentina) Franco Geminiani	Gabriel Werner Competicion	15	15	12	14	19	?	?	14	17	15	14	8	15
22	(Argentina) Fernando Ayala	Croizet Racing	18	9			22		?	20	15	11	15	18	12
23	(Argentina) Alejandro Wagner	Gabriel Werner Competición	16	13	11	16	15	?	?	19	16	16	18	16	12
24	(Argentina) Nicolás Dominici	Osdom Racing	19	10	18			?		26			25	19	10
25	(Argentina) Bruno Etman	Litoral Group	13	17		10	9	?							8
26	(Argentina) Manuel Mallo	JLS Motorsport	10	24	22		25			21			16	20	7
27	(Argentina) Santiago Piovano	Litoral Group				18	20	?	?	30	21	22			7
28	(Chile) Sebastian Valenzuela	Basco Racing Team		18	13			?	?				22	21	6
29	(Argentina) Federico Cavagnero	Castro Racing								15	14		23	11	4
30	(Chile) José Luis Riffo	Litoral Group								17					2
31	(Argentina) Nicolás Bonfiglio	Caceres Competición							?	27					1
32	(Argentina) Nicolás Meichtri	HRC Pro Team								28					1
33	(Argentina) Lucas Herasimchuk	Croizet Racing	22												0

Colour	Result
Gold	Winner
Silver	2nd place
Bronze	3rd place
Green	Finished, in points
Green	Retired, in points
Blue	Finished, no points
Purple	Did not finish (Ret)
Purple	Not classified (NC)
Red	Did not qualify (DNQ)
Black	Disqualified (DSQ)
White	Did not start (DNS)
White	Withdrew (WD)
Blank	Did not participate
Blank	Injured (INJ)
Blank	Excluded (EX)
**Bold**	Pole position
*	Fastest lap
spr	Sprint Race
fea	Feature Race
