= 2009 Formula Renault 2.0 Italia =

Motor racing competition

Seasons
- ← 2008 2010 →

The 2009 Formula Renault 2.0 Italia season was the tenth season of the Formula Renault 2.0 Italia and the last as one of the prominent Formula Renault series. Though the Italian series effectively merged with the Formula Renault 2.0 Suisse to form the Formula Renault 2.0 Middle European Championship from 2010, the Italia series would continue with older cars for three more seasons.

Most races were in Italy, with additional races at the Hungaroring (Hungary) and the Circuit de Spa-Francorchamps (Belgium). Daniel Mancinelli won the competition, taking home six wins. It was his third season in Formula Renault and his first with the One Racing team. CO2 Motorsport won the team championship.

== Drivers and Teams ==
2009 Entry List
Team	No.	Driver name	Rounds
(Italy) One Racing	1	(Italy) Daniel Mancinelli	All
(Italy) One Racing	2	(Italy) Federico Scionti	1-6
(Italy) CO2 Motorsport	3	(Portugal) Bernardo Arnaut	All
(Italy) CO2 Motorsport	4	(Switzerland) Stefano Comini	1-6
(Italy) CO2 Motorsport	60	(Chile) Martín Scuncio	1, 3-5
(Italy) CO2 Motorsport	61	(Italy) Giovanni Venturini	1, 3-7
(Italy) CO2 Motorsport	62	(Germany) Thiemo Storz	3
(Italy) BVM Minardi Team	5	(Italy) Andrea Roda	1-3, 5-7
(Italy) BVM Minardi Team	6	(Canada) Tyler Dueck	All
(Italy) BVM Minardi Team	14	(Netherlands) Thomas Hylkema	6
(Italy) Scuderia Antonino	7	(Italy) Antonino Pellegrino	1-5, 7
(Italy) Facondini by Draco	8	(France) Romain Vozniak	All
(Italy) Facondini by Draco	9	(Italy) Marco Betti	1-2
(Italy) Facondini by Draco	10	(Slovakia) Nikolas Kvasai	1-5
(Italy) Tomcat Racing	11	(Italy) Vittoria Piria	5
(Italy) Tomcat Racing	64	(Italy) Mattia Brugiotti	1
(Italy) Linerace Technology	16	(Italy) Stefano Carlet	1
(Italy) Linerace Technology	18	(Italy) Federico Vecchi	1
(Austria) Steiner Motorsport	21	(Austria) Bianca Steiner	1-2
(Italy) CG Motorsport	23	(Italy) Cristian Corsini	1
(Poland) Kochanski Motorsport Project	33	(Poland) Jakub Smiechowski	4, 6-7
(Switzerland) Jenzer Motorsport	50	(Spain) Genis Olivé	All
(Switzerland) Jenzer Motorsport	51	(Russia) Maxim Zimin	7
(Switzerland) Jenzer Motorsport	52	(Switzerland) Zoel Amberg	All
(Switzerland) Jenzer Motorsport	54	(Italy) Eddie Cheever III	4-7
(Italy) Team Dueppì Victoria	72	(Brazil) Francisco Weiler	7
(Italy) Team Dueppì Victoria	75	(Italy) Leonardo Osmieri	7
(Italy) Cram Competition	73	(Italy) Andrea Amici	4
(Italy) Cram Competition	76	(Italy) Giacomo Barri	4
(Italy) Cram Competition	77	(Italy) Matteo Davenia	1
(Italy) Cram Competition	78	(Italy) Stefano Colombo	1, 5
(Italy) Cram Competition	85	(Brazil) André Negrão	5-6

== Calendar ==
Round	Race	Circuit	Date	Pole position	Fastest lap	Winning driver	Winning team
1	R1	(Italy) Autodromo Nazionale Monza	April 4	(Switzerland) Stefano Comini	(Italy) Daniel Mancinelli	(Canada) Tyler Dueck	(Italy) BVM Minardi Team
1	R2	(Italy) Autodromo Nazionale Monza	April 5	(Switzerland) Stefano Comini	(Canada) Tyler Dueck	(Italy) Daniel Mancinelli	(Italy) One Racing
2	R1	(Italy) Autodromo Riccardo Paletti	May 23	(Italy) Daniel Mancinelli	(Italy) Daniel Mancinelli	(Italy) Daniel Mancinelli	(Italy) One Racing
2	R2	(Italy) Autodromo Riccardo Paletti	May 24	(Italy) Daniel Mancinelli	(Spain) Genis Olivé	(Italy) Federico Scionti	(Italy) One Racing
3	R1	(Hungary) Hungaroring	June 14	(Spain) Genis Olivé	(Spain) Genis Olivé	(Spain) Genis Olivé	(Switzerland) Jenzer Motorsport
3	R2	(Hungary) Hungaroring	June 14	(Spain) Genis Olivé	(Spain) Genis Olivé	(Spain) Genis Olivé	(Switzerland) Jenzer Motorsport
4	R1	(Belgium) Circuit de Spa-Francorchamps	June 27	(Chile) Martín Scuncio	(Chile) Martín Scuncio	(Chile) Martín Scuncio	(Italy) CO2 Motorsport
4	R2	(Belgium) Circuit de Spa-Francorchamps	June 28	(Italy) Daniel Mancinelli	(Italy) Daniel Mancinelli	(Italy) Daniel Mancinelli	(Italy) One Racing
5	R1	(Italy) Misano World Circuit	July 25	(Italy) Daniel Mancinelli	(Italy) Daniel Mancinelli	(Italy) Daniel Mancinelli	(Italy) One Racing
5	R2	(Italy) Misano World Circuit	July 26	(Switzerland) Stefano Comini	(Italy) Daniel Mancinelli	(Italy) Giovanni Venturini	(Italy) CO2 Motorsport
6	R1	(Italy) Mugello Circuit	September 12	(Italy) Daniel Mancinelli	(Italy) Daniel Mancinelli	(Italy) Daniel Mancinelli	(Italy) One Racing
6	R2	(Italy) Mugello Circuit	September 13	(Italy) Daniel Mancinelli	(Italy) Daniel Mancinelli	(Italy) Daniel Mancinelli	(Italy) One Racing
7	R1	(Italy) Adria International Raceway	October 10	(Switzerland) Zoel Amberg	(Spain) Genis Olivé	(Switzerland) Zoel Amberg	(Switzerland) Jenzer Motorsport
7	R2	(Italy) Adria International Raceway	October 11	(Switzerland) Zoel Amberg	(Spain) Genis Olivé	(Switzerland) Zoel Amberg	(Switzerland) Jenzer Motorsport

== Championship standings ==
Each championship round included 2 races by rounds length of 30 minutes each. Points were awarded as follows:

Position	1st	2nd	3rd	4th	5th	6th	7th	8th	9th	10th	11th	12th	13th	14th	15th
Points	32	28	24	22	20	18	16	14	12	10	8	6	4	2	1

In each race, 2 additional points were awarded for pole position, and 2 for fastest lap.

=== Drivers ===
Pos	Driver	(Italy) MNZ		(Italy) VAR		(Hungary) HUN		(Belgium) SPA		(Italy) MIS		(Italy) MUG		(Italy) ADR		Points
Pos	Driver	1	2	3	4	5	6	7	8	9	10	11	12	13	14	Points
1	(Italy) Daniel Mancinelli	9	1	1	3	3	4	3	1	1	15	1	1	2	Ret	353
2	(Spain) Genís Olivé	Ret	DNS	4	2	1	1	14	2	14	2	2	3	3	2	292
3	(Italy) Giovanni Venturini	Ret	3			2	9	2	3	2	1	3	2	4	3	274
4	(Switzerland) Zoël Amberg	Ret	DNS	10	6	Ret	6	6	6	5	4	4	8	1	1	228
5	(Canada) Tyler Dueck	1	4	13	7	9	8	8	5	Ret	5	8	11	6	4	218
6	(Switzerland) Stefano Comini	Ret	2	3	4	4	3	4	15	15	14	6	4			192
7	(Portugal) Bernardo Arnaut	8	10	5	5	11	DSQ	5	12	6	6	Ret	5	7	9	182
8	(Italy) Federico Scionti	Ret	9	2	1	5	2	DNS	DNS	4	8	DSQ	DNS			156
9	(Chile) Martin Scuncio	Ret	7			12	13	1	4	3	3					132
10	(Italy) Antonino Pellegrino	10	13	7	11	7	12	11	11	8	12			11	7	120
11	(Slovakia) Nikolas Kvašai	7	12	8	8	6	5	13	8	Ret	9					118
12	(Italy) Andrea Roda	3	5	11	Ret	8	10			12	Ret	Ret	10	8	12	112
13	(France) Romain Vozniak	Ret	8	12	9	10	11	12	13	11	11	Ret	13	9	8	106
14	(Italy) Eddie Cheever							10	9	9	Ret	9	9	5	5	98
15	(Brazil) André Negrão									7	7	7	6			66
16	(Italy) Stefano Colombo	5	11							10	10					48
17	(Italy) Cristian Corsini	2	6													46
18	(Netherlands) Thomas Hylkema											5	7			36
19	(Austria) Bianca Steiner	4	Ret	9	Ret											34
20	(Italy) Giacomo Barri							7	7							32
21	(Poland) Jakub Śmiechowski							15	14			10	12	Ret	10	29
22	(Italy) Marco Betti	Ret	DSQ	6	10											28
23	(Italy) Andrea Amici							9	10							22
24	(Germany) Thiemo Storz					13	7									20
25	(Italy) Mattia Brugiotti	6	16													18
26	(Italy) Leonardo Osmieri													DNS	6	18
27	(Russia) Maxim Zimin													12	11	14
28	(Brazil) Francisco Weiler													10	13	14
29	(Italy) Vittoria Piria									13	13					8
30	(Italy) Matteo Davenia	Ret	14													2
31	(Italy) Federico Vecchi	Ret	15													1
32	(Italy) Stefano Carlet	Ret	Ret													0

=== Teams ===
Pos	Team	Points
1	(Italy) CO2 Motorsport	690
2	(Switzerland) Jenzer Motorsport	578
3	(Italy) One Racing	509
4	(Italy) BVM Minardi Team	362
5	(Italy) Facondini by Draco Racing	244
6	(Italy) Cram Competition	170
7	(Italy) Scuderia Antonino	120
8	(Italy) CG Motorsport	46
9	(Austria) Steiner Motorsport	34
10	(Italy) Team Dueppì	32
11	(Poland) Kochanski Motorsport Project	29
12	(Italy) Tomcat Racing	26
13	(Italy) Linerace Technology	1
