= Kreator Racing =

Croatian racing team

- Founded: 2012
- Base: Jastrebarsko, Croatia
- Team principal(s): Davorin Stetner
- Current series: Croatian MX Championships
- Former series: Formula Renault 2.0. Italia; Croatian Karting Championships
- Current drivers: Nikola Hranic; Matija Sterpin; Antonio Blažeković; Matej Jaroš; Vinko Evačić; Kristian Jakopec
- Teams' Championships: Croatian Karting Championships: 2012; Croatian MX Championships/junior: 2015, 2016
- Drivers' Championships: Croatian Karting Championships: 2012: Damian Sekulić; Croatian MX Championships/junior: 2015, 2016: Nikola Hranić; 2015, 2016: Matija Šterpin; 2015: Antonio Blažeković
- Website: http://www.kreatorracing.com

Kreator Racing is a racing team based in Jastrebarsko, Croatia. It currently competes in the Croatian MX Championships and European MX Championships.

== Career ==
=== Formula Renault 2.0 Italia ===
The team's first season in motorsports was in Formula Renault 2.0 Italia. Kreator's driver Kristijan Habulin finished second and he was titled best rookie at the end of the season.

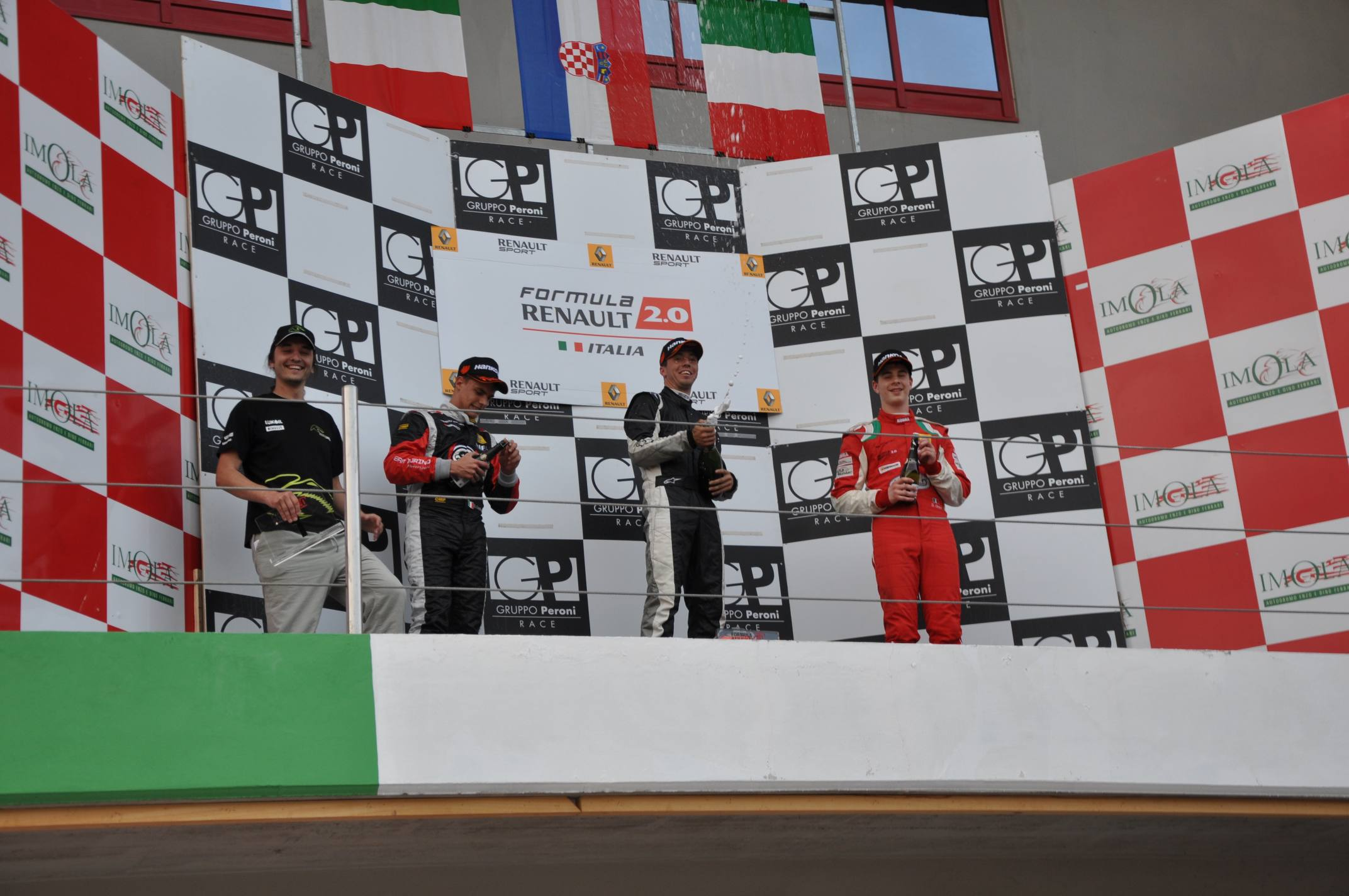
Kristijan Habulin celebrating his first victory for Kreator Racing Team in Imola!

Kristijan Habulin's debut was at round one of the Formula Renault 2.0 Italia on 25 March 2012 at Monza. He finished fifth and sixth. Habulin's and Kreator Racing's major racing weekend happened at round two at Imola, on 27 May 2012. In race one Habulin finished third and this was his first podium in the series. However, this was just an introduction to race two, which he won. This represents one of the top five results in the Croatian single-seaters until now. At round three in Misano on 22 July, Habulin was third in both races. Round four was at the Red Bull Ring Austria on 2 September, and Habulin achieved third place in race one and second place in race two. At the end of the season Habulin raced in round five at the Vallelunga in which he crashed in race one and was seventh in race two and Mugello where he finished fourth and fifth. A prize giving ceremony was held at Mugello racetrack after the Race 2, in which Habulin was officially named runner-up in drivers championship, and the best rookie. Kreator Racing finished 4th in the Team Championship despite the fact they competed only with one driver. This was the first and only season in the series and one of the best team and driver debuts in the series.

=== Croatian Karting Championships ===
Along with the Formula Renault 2.0 Italia - Kreator Racing started competing in the Croatian National Karting Championships in 2012.

The drivers were Damian Sekulić and Max Herendić in Mini Kart and Juraj Kovačić in KF3 class. The first race was held on 22 April 2012 at theNovi Marof track and Sekulic won both races with the team scoring the first round 1 victory. Until the end of the season Sekulić scored 10 victories with one 2nd place and one DNF, and became the national champion. Kreator Racing became Team Champion of Croatia with 722 points. Kovacic and Herendic were 2nd.

In 2013 Kreator Racing competed with new drivers. Representing the team, Karlo Golub competed in the strongest class KZ2, William Mucak in KF3 and Leo Srđenović in Minikart. Team was third at the end of the season with two wins out of 6 Rounds. Golub finished 2nd, Mucak 3rd and Srđenović 4th - each in his class.

=== Croatian MX Championships ===
After a pause in racing in 2014 and following Kreator TV's (Kreator Racing's sister company) signing of MX GP contract with MX GP promoter, Youthstream Kreator Racing turned to motocross in 2015.

== Results ==
=== Formula Renault 2.0 Italia ===
Year	Car	Drivers	Races	Wins	Poles	Podiums	Points	D.C.	T.C.
2012	Tatuus-Renault	(Croatia) Kristijan Habulin	12	1	0	5	149	2nd	4th

=== Croatian Karting Championship ===
Year	Car	Drivers	Races	Wins	Poles	Podiums	Points	D.C.	T.C.
2012	Minikart	(Croatia) Damian Sekulic	12	10	0	1	225	1st	1st
2012	Minikart	(Croatia) Max Herendic	12	2	0	9	210	2nd	1st
2012	KF3	(Croatia) Juraj Kovačić	12	1	0	10	197	2nd	1st
