= 2010 8 Hours of Castellet =

Circuit Paul Ricard 1A-V2 (pit road was different before 2019

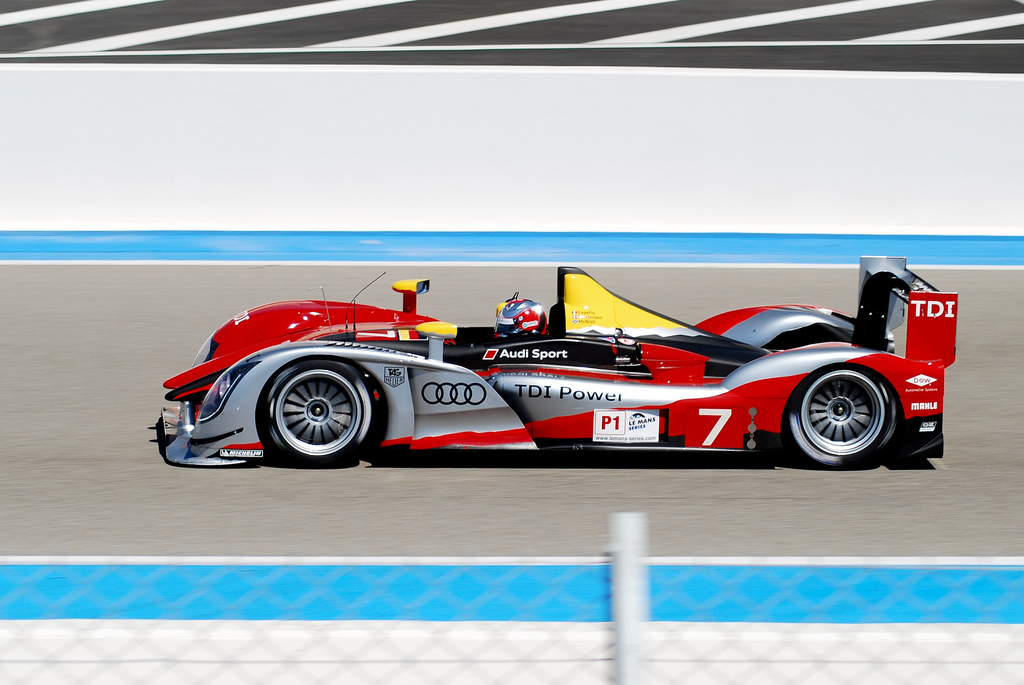
Allan McNish and Rinaldo Capello took overall victory in the No. 7 Audi R15 TDI plus.

The 2010 8 Hours of Le Castellet (8 Heures du Castellet) was the inaugural round of the 2010 Le Mans Series season. It took place at the Circuit Paul Ricard, Le Castellet, France on 11 April 2010. It was the first Le Mans Series race that is longer than the standard 1,000-km distance the LMS use since the 2007 Mil Milhas Brasil. Audi Sport Team Joest won the race overall in their first use of the Audi R15 TDI in the Le Mans Series, with drivers Allan McNish and Rinaldo Capello. Aston Martin Racing and Rebellion Racing completed the overall podium five laps behind the winning Audi. Strakka Racing also brought Honda Performance Development a win on their debut in the LMP2 category, leading the OAK Racing Pescarolo by 33 seconds. Applewood Seven won the Formula Le Mans category, the first event in which this class participated in the Le Mans Series. Team Felbermayr-Proton dominated the GT2 category by finishing in the top two positions, ahead of the first of the AF Corse Ferraris.

== Qualifying ==
Qualifying saw Oreca take pole position in their first outing with their new Peugeot 908 HDi FAP, beating the factory Audi R15 TDI by 0.4 seconds. Strakka Racing had a similar story taking LMP2 pole in their first outing with their HPD ARX-01C. They qualified two seconds before the next nearest car, the Quifel Ginetta-Zytek. AF Corse took GT2 pole and DAMS took the first pole position in Le Mans Series history in the new Formula Le Mans class.

=== Qualifying result ===
Pole position winners in each class are marked in bold.

Pos	Class	Team	Driver	Lap Time	Grid
1	**LMP1**	**No.4 Team Oreca Matmut**	**Nicolas Lapierre**	**1:41.195**	**1**
2	LMP1	No.7 Audi Sport Team Joest	Rinaldo Capello	1:41.632	2
3	LMP1	No.009 Aston Martin Racing	Stefan Mücke	1:42.345	3
4	LMP1	No.6 AIM Team Oreca Matmut	Loïc Duval	1:42.685	4
5	LMP1	No.13 Rebellion Racing	Jean-Christophe Boullion	1:43.435	5
6	LMP1	No.12 Rebellion Racing	Neel Jani	1:44.032	6
7	LMP1	No.5 Beechdean Mansell	Greg Mansell	1:44.475	7
8	LMP1	No.008 Signature-Plus	Pierre Ragues	1:44.914	8
9	**LMP2**	**No.42 Strakka Racing**	**Danny Watts**	**1:44.989**	**9**
10	LMP2	No.40 Quifel ASM Team	Olivier Pla	1:47.112	10
11	LMP2	No.24 OAK Racing	Mathieu Laheye	1:47.474	11
12	LMP2	No.25 RML	Thomas Erdos	1:47.491	12
13	LMP2	No.41 Team Bruichladdich	Thor-Christian Ebbesvik	1:48.439	13
14	LMP2	No.30 Racing Box	Andrea Piccini	1:48.635	14
15	LMP2	No.37 WR / Salini	Tristan Gommendy	1:49.567	15
16	LMP2	No.29 Racing Box	Marco Cioci	1:49.931	16
17	LMP2	No.39 KSM	Hideki Noda	1:50.913	17
18	LMP2	No.27 Race Performance	Tyler Dueck	1:52.612	18
19	**FLM**	**No.44 DAMS**	**Edoardo Piscopo**	**1:52.936**	**19**
20	FLM	No.48 Hope Polevision Racing	Mathias Beche	1:53.090	20
21	LMP2	No.38 Pegasus Racing	Julien Schell	1:53.148	21
22	FLM	No.49 Applewood Seven	David Zollinger	1:53.447	22
23	FLM	No.45 Boutsen Energy Racing	Dominik Kraihamer	1:53.850	23
24	FLM	No.43 DAMS	Alessandro Cicognani	1:54.187	24
25	FLM	No.47 Hope Polevision Racing	Steve Zacchia	1:54.305	25
26	**GT1**	**No.50 Larbre Compétition**	**Gabriele Gardel**	**1:57.085**	**25**
27	**GT2**	**No.96 AF Corse**	**Gianmaria Bruni**	**1:57.850**	**27**
28	GT2	No.77 Team Felbermayr-Proton	Richard Lietz	1:58.216	28
29	GT2	No.91 CRS Racing	Tim Mullen	1:58.475	29
30	GT2	No.95 AF Corse	Toni Vilander	1:58.545	30
31	GT2	No.92 JMW Motorsport	Rob Bell	1:58.549	31
32	GT2	No.94 AF Corse	Matías Russo	1:58.707	32
33	GT2	No.90 CRS Racing	Pierre Kaffer	1:59.021	33
34	GT2	No.76 IMSA Performance Matmut	Patrick Pilet	1:59.035	34
35	GT2	No.85 Spyker Squadron	Jeroen Bleekemolen	1:59.177	35
36	GT2	No.88 Team Felbermayr-Proton	Martin Ragginger	1:59.447	36
37	GT2	No.89 Hankook Team Farnbacher	Dominik Farnbacher	1:59.480	37
38	GT2	No.75 Prospeed Competition	Richard Westbrook	1:59.539	38
39	GT2	No.78 BMW Team Schnitzer	Jörg Müller	1:59.593	39
40	FLM	No.46 JMB Racing	Maurice Basso	2:00.775	40
-	LMP2	No.35 OAK Racing		No Time	41

== Race ==
=== Race result ===
Class winners in bold. Cars failing to complete 70% of winner's distance marked as Not Classified (NC).

Pos	Class	No	Team	Drivers	Chassis	Tyre	Laps
Pos	Class	No	Team	Drivers	Engine	Tyre	Laps
1	**LMP1**	**7**	**(Germany) Audi Sport Team Joest**	**(United Kingdom) Allan McNish (Italy) Rinaldo Capello**	**Audi R15 TDI plus**	MI	**266**
1	**LMP1**	**7**	**(Germany) Audi Sport Team Joest**	**(United Kingdom) Allan McNish (Italy) Rinaldo Capello**	**Audi TDI 5.5 L Turbo V10 (Diesel)**	MI	**266**
2	LMP1	009	(United Kingdom) Aston Martin Racing	(Mexico) Adrian Fernández (Switzerland) Harold Primat (Germany) Stefan Mücke	Lola-Aston Martin B09/60	MI	261
2	LMP1	009	(United Kingdom) Aston Martin Racing	(Mexico) Adrian Fernández (Switzerland) Harold Primat (Germany) Stefan Mücke	Aston Martin AM04 6.0 L V12	MI	261
3	LMP1	13	(Switzerland) Rebellion Racing	(Italy) Andrea Belicchi (France) Jean-Christophe Boullion (United Kingdom) Guy Smith	Lola B10/60	MI	261
3	LMP1	13	(Switzerland) Rebellion Racing	(Italy) Andrea Belicchi (France) Jean-Christophe Boullion (United Kingdom) Guy Smith	Rebellion (Judd) 5.5 L V10	MI	261
4	LMP1	4	(France) Team Oreca Matmut	(France) Olivier Panis (France) Nicolas Lapierre (France) Stéphane Sarrazin	Peugeot 908 HDi FAP	MI	258
4	LMP1	4	(France) Team Oreca Matmut	(France) Olivier Panis (France) Nicolas Lapierre (France) Stéphane Sarrazin	Peugeot HDi 5.5 L Turbo V12 (Diesel)	MI	258
5	LMP1	6	(France) AIM Team Oreca Matmut	(France) Soheil Ayari (France) Loïc Duval (France) Didier André	Oreca 01	D	258
5	LMP1	6	(France) AIM Team Oreca Matmut	(France) Soheil Ayari (France) Loïc Duval (France) Didier André	AIM YS5.5 5.5 L V10	D	258
6	LMP1	008	(France) Signature-Plus	(France) Pierre Ragues (France) Franck Mailleux (Belgium) Vanina Ickx	Lola-Aston Martin B09/60	D	256
6	LMP1	008	(France) Signature-Plus	(France) Pierre Ragues (France) Franck Mailleux (Belgium) Vanina Ickx	Aston Martin AM04 6.0 L V12	D	256
7	**LMP2**	**42**	**(United Kingdom) Strakka Racing**	**(United Kingdom) Danny Watts (United Kingdom) Nick Leventis (United Kingdom) Jonny Kane**	**HPD ARX-01C**	MI	**250**
7	**LMP2**	**42**	**(United Kingdom) Strakka Racing**	**(United Kingdom) Danny Watts (United Kingdom) Nick Leventis (United Kingdom) Jonny Kane**	**HPD AL7R 3.4 L V8**	MI	**250**
8	LMP2	35	(France) OAK Racing	(France) Guillaume Moreau (Monaco) Richard Hein	Pescarolo 01	D	250
8	LMP2	35	(France) OAK Racing	(France) Guillaume Moreau (Monaco) Richard Hein	Judd DB 3.4 L V8	D	250
9	LMP2	25	(United Kingdom) RML	(United Kingdom) Mike Newton (Brazil) Thomas Erdos (United Kingdom) Andy Wallace	Lola B08/80	D	249
9	LMP2	25	(United Kingdom) RML	(United Kingdom) Mike Newton (Brazil) Thomas Erdos (United Kingdom) Andy Wallace	HPD AL7R 3.4 V8	D	249
10	LMP2	24	(France) OAK Racing	(France) Jacques Nicolet (France) Matthieu Lahaye	Pescarolo 01	D	249
10	LMP2	24	(France) OAK Racing	(France) Jacques Nicolet (France) Matthieu Lahaye	Judd DB 3.4 L V8	D	249
11	LMP1	12	(Switzerland) Rebellion Racing	(Switzerland) Neel Jani (France) Nicolas Prost	Lola B10/60	MI	248
11	LMP1	12	(Switzerland) Rebellion Racing	(Switzerland) Neel Jani (France) Nicolas Prost	Rebellion (Judd) 5.5 L V10	MI	248
12	LMP2	41	(United Kingdom) Team Bruichladdich	(Norway) Thor-Christian Ebbesvik (United Kingdom) Tim Greaves (Saudi Arabia) Karim Ojjeh	Ginetta-Zytek GZ09SB/2	D	248
12	LMP2	41	(United Kingdom) Team Bruichladdich	(Norway) Thor-Christian Ebbesvik (United Kingdom) Tim Greaves (Saudi Arabia) Karim Ojjeh	Zytek ZG348 3.4 L V8	D	248
13	LMP2	30	(Italy) Racing Box	(Italy) Andrea Piccini (Italy) Giacomo Piccini (Italy) Ferdinando Geri	Lola B09/80	P	246
13	LMP2	30	(Italy) Racing Box	(Italy) Andrea Piccini (Italy) Giacomo Piccini (Italy) Ferdinando Geri	Judd DB 3.4 L V8	P	246
14	LMP1	5	(United Kingdom) Beechdean Mansell	(United Kingdom) Nigel Mansell (United Kingdom) Greg Mansell (United Kingdom) Leo Mansell	Ginetta-Zytek GZ09SB	D	243
14	LMP1	5	(United Kingdom) Beechdean Mansell	(United Kingdom) Nigel Mansell (United Kingdom) Greg Mansell (United Kingdom) Leo Mansell	Zytek ZJ458 4.5 L V8	D	243
15	**FLM**	**49**	**(France) Applewood Seven**	**(France) Damien Toulemonde (France) David Zollinger (Australia) Ross Zampatti**	**Oreca FLM09**	MI	**237**
15	**FLM**	**49**	**(France) Applewood Seven**	**(France) Damien Toulemonde (France) David Zollinger (Australia) Ross Zampatti**	**Corvette 6.2 L V8**	MI	**237**
16	FLM	48	(Switzerland) Hope Polevision Racing	(Switzerland) Mathias Beche (Switzerland) Christophe Pillon (France) Vincent Capillaire	Oreca FLM09	MI	237
16	FLM	48	(Switzerland) Hope Polevision Racing	(Switzerland) Mathias Beche (Switzerland) Christophe Pillon (France) Vincent Capillaire	Corvette 6.2 L V8	MI	237
17	FLM	43	(France) DAMS	(Italy) Alessandro Cicognani (Italy) Andrea Barlesi (France) Gary Chalandon	Oreca FLM09	MI	235
17	FLM	43	(France) DAMS	(Italy) Alessandro Cicognani (Italy) Andrea Barlesi (France) Gary Chalandon	Corvette 6.2 L V8	MI	235
18	**GT2**	**77**	**(Germany) Team Felbermayr-Proton**	**(Germany) Marc Lieb (Austria) Richard Lietz**	**Porsche 997 GT3-RSR**	MI	**233**
18	**GT2**	**77**	**(Germany) Team Felbermayr-Proton**	**(Germany) Marc Lieb (Austria) Richard Lietz**	**Porsche 4.0 L Flat-6**	MI	**233**
19	FLM	47	(Switzerland) Hope Polevision Racing	(Switzerland) Steve Zacchia (Germany) Wolfgang Kaufmann (Italy) Luca Moro	Oreca FLM09	MI	231
19	FLM	47	(Switzerland) Hope Polevision Racing	(Switzerland) Steve Zacchia (Germany) Wolfgang Kaufmann (Italy) Luca Moro	Corvette 6.2 L V8	MI	231
20	GT2	88	(Germany) Team Felbermayr-Proton	(Germany) Christian Ried (Austria) Martin Ragginger (United States) Patrick Long	Porsche 997 GT3-RSR	MI	231
20	GT2	88	(Germany) Team Felbermayr-Proton	(Germany) Christian Ried (Austria) Martin Ragginger (United States) Patrick Long	Porsche 4.0 L Flat-6	MI	231
21	GT2	95	(Italy) AF Corse	(Italy) Giancarlo Fisichella (Finland) Toni Vilander (France) Jean Alesi	Ferrari F430 GT2	MI	231
21	GT2	95	(Italy) AF Corse	(Italy) Giancarlo Fisichella (Finland) Toni Vilander (France) Jean Alesi	Ferrari 4.0 L V8	MI	231
22	GT2	90	(United Kingdom) CRS Racing	(United Kingdom) Phil Quaife (Germany) Pierre Ehret (Germany) Pierre Kaffer	Ferrari F430 GT2	MI	231
22	GT2	90	(United Kingdom) CRS Racing	(United Kingdom) Phil Quaife (Germany) Pierre Ehret (Germany) Pierre Kaffer	Ferrari 4.0 L V8	MI	231
23	GT2	94	(Italy) AF Corse	(Argentina) Luís Pérez Companc (Argentina) Matías Russo	Ferrari F430 GT2	MI	231
23	GT2	94	(Italy) AF Corse	(Argentina) Luís Pérez Companc (Argentina) Matías Russo	Ferrari 4.0 L V8	MI	231
24	**GT1**	**50**	**(France) Larbre Compétition**	**(Switzerland) Gabriele Gardel (France) Patrice Goueslard (France) Julien Canal**	**Saleen S7-R**	MI	**229**
24	**GT1**	**50**	**(France) Larbre Compétition**	**(Switzerland) Gabriele Gardel (France) Patrice Goueslard (France) Julien Canal**	**Ford 7.0 L V8**	MI	**229**
25	GT2	78	(Germany) BMW Team Schnitzer	(Germany) Jörg Müller (Germany) Dirk Werner	BMW M3 GT2	D	225
25	GT2	78	(Germany) BMW Team Schnitzer	(Germany) Jörg Müller (Germany) Dirk Werner	BMW 4.0 L V8	D	225
26	LMP2	36	(France) Pegasus Racing	(France) Julien Schell (France) Frédéric Da Rocha (Switzerland) Jean-Christophe Metz	Courage LC75	D	219
26	LMP2	36	(France) Pegasus Racing	(France) Julien Schell (France) Frédéric Da Rocha (Switzerland) Jean-Christophe Metz	AER P07 2.0 L Turbo I4	D	219
27	GT2	76	(France) IMSA Performance Matmut	(France) Patrick Pilet (France) Raymond Narac	Porsche 997 GT3-RSR	MI	219
27	GT2	76	(France) IMSA Performance Matmut	(France) Patrick Pilet (France) Raymond Narac	Porsche 4.0 L Flat-6	MI	219
28	GT2	85	(Netherlands) Spyker Squadron	(Netherlands) Tom Coronel (Netherlands) Jeroen Bleekemolen (United Kingdom) Peter Dumbreck	Spyker C8 Laviolette GT2-R	MI	215
28	GT2	85	(Netherlands) Spyker Squadron	(Netherlands) Tom Coronel (Netherlands) Jeroen Bleekemolen (United Kingdom) Peter Dumbreck	Audi 4.0 L V8	MI	215
29	LMP2	39	(Germany) KSM	(France) Jean de Pourtales (Japan) Hideki Noda (United Kingdom) Jonathan Kennard	Lola B08/47	D	188
29	LMP2	39	(Germany) KSM	(France) Jean de Pourtales (Japan) Hideki Noda (United Kingdom) Jonathan Kennard	Judd DB 3.4 L V8	D	188
30 DNF	GT2	89	(Germany) Hankook Team Farnbacher	(Germany) Dominik Farnbacher (Denmark) Allan Simonsen	Ferrari F430 GT2	HK	204
30 DNF	GT2	89	(Germany) Hankook Team Farnbacher	(Germany) Dominik Farnbacher (Denmark) Allan Simonsen	Ferrari 4.0 L V8	HK	204
31 DNF	FLM	44	(France) DAMS	(United Kingdom) Dean Stirling (United Kingdom) Luke Hines (Italy) Edoardo Piscopo	Oreca FLM09	MI	203
31 DNF	FLM	44	(France) DAMS	(United Kingdom) Dean Stirling (United Kingdom) Luke Hines (Italy) Edoardo Piscopo	Corvette 6.2 L V8	MI	203
32 DNF	FLM	46	(Monaco) JMB Racing	(Netherlands) Peter Kutemann (Switzerland) Maurice Basso (United Kingdom) John Hartshorne	Oreca FLM09	MI	203
32 DNF	FLM	46	(Monaco) JMB Racing	(Netherlands) Peter Kutemann (Switzerland) Maurice Basso (United Kingdom) John Hartshorne	Corvette 6.2 L V8	MI	203
33 DNF	LMP2	40	(Portugal) Quifel ASM Team	(Portugal) Miguel Amaral (France) Olivier Pla (United Kingdom) Warren Hughes	Ginetta-Zytek GZ09SB/2	D	200
33 DNF	LMP2	40	(Portugal) Quifel ASM Team	(Portugal) Miguel Amaral (France) Olivier Pla (United Kingdom) Warren Hughes	Zytek ZG348 3.4 L V8	D	200
34 DNF	FLM	45	(Belgium) Boutsen Energy Racing	(Belgium) Nicolas De Crem (Austria) Dominik Kraihamer (Belgium) Bernard Delhez	Oreca FLM09	MI	195
34 DNF	FLM	45	(Belgium) Boutsen Energy Racing	(Belgium) Nicolas De Crem (Austria) Dominik Kraihamer (Belgium) Bernard Delhez	Corvette 6.2 L V8	MI	195
35 DNF	LMP2	37	(France) WR / Salini	(France) Philippe Salini (France) Stéphane Salini (France) Tristan Gommendy	WR LMP2008	D	168
35 DNF	LMP2	37	(France) WR / Salini	(France) Philippe Salini (France) Stéphane Salini (France) Tristan Gommendy	Zytek ZG348 3.4 L V8	D	168
36 DNF	GT2	96	(Italy) AF Corse	(Italy) Gianmaria Bruni (Brazil) Jaime Melo	Ferrari F430 GT2	MI	152
36 DNF	GT2	96	(Italy) AF Corse	(Italy) Gianmaria Bruni (Brazil) Jaime Melo	Ferrari 4.0 L V8	MI	152
37 DNF	GT2	91	(United Kingdom) CRS Racing	(United Kingdom) Andrew Kirkaldy (United Kingdom) Tim Mullen	Ferrari F430 GT2	MI	123
37 DNF	GT2	91	(United Kingdom) CRS Racing	(United Kingdom) Andrew Kirkaldy (United Kingdom) Tim Mullen	Ferrari 4.0 L V8	MI	123
38 DNF	LMP2	29	(Italy) Racing Box	(Italy) Luca Pirri (Italy) Marco Cioci (Italy) Piergiuseppe Perazzini	Lola B09/80	P	116
38 DNF	LMP2	29	(Italy) Racing Box	(Italy) Luca Pirri (Italy) Marco Cioci (Italy) Piergiuseppe Perazzini	Judd DB 3.4 L V8	P	116
39 DNF	LMP2	27	(Switzerland) Race Performance	(Switzerland) Michel Frey (Switzerland) Ralph Meichtry (Canada) Tyler Dueck	Radical SR9	D	66
39 DNF	LMP2	27	(Switzerland) Race Performance	(Switzerland) Michel Frey (Switzerland) Ralph Meichtry (Canada) Tyler Dueck	Judd DB 3.4 L V8	D	66
40 DNF	GT2	92	(United Kingdom) JMW Motorsport	(United Kingdom) Rob Bell (United Kingdom) Darren Turner	Aston Martin V8 Vantage GT2	D	65
40 DNF	GT2	92	(United Kingdom) JMW Motorsport	(United Kingdom) Rob Bell (United Kingdom) Darren Turner	Aston Martin 4.5 L V8	D	65
41 DNF	GT2	75	(Belgium) Prospeed Competition	(Germany) Marco Holzer (United Kingdom) Richard Westbrook	Porsche 997 GT3-RSR	MI	54
41 DNF	GT2	75	(Belgium) Prospeed Competition	(Germany) Marco Holzer (United Kingdom) Richard Westbrook	Porsche 4.0 L Flat-6	MI	54

Le Mans Series
Previous race: none	2010 season	Next race: 1000 km of Spa
