= 2010 Formula Renault 2.0 Italia =

Motor racing competition

Seasons
- ← 2009 2011 →

The 2010 Formula Renault 2.0 Italia season was the eleventh season of the Formula Renault 2.0 Italia Francesco Frisone won the competition, taking home three wins. Viola Formula Racing won the team championship.

== Drivers and Teams ==
2010 Entry List
Team	No.	Driver name	Rounds
(Italy) One Racing	1	(Italy) Edolo Ghirelli	2-5
(Italy) One Racing	2	(Italy) Damiano Manni	1-2
(Italy) One Racing	36	(Italy) Vittorio Ghirelli	4
(Italy) CO2 Motorsport	3	(Italy) Claudio Castiglioni	All
(Italy) CO2 Motorsport	4	(Italy) Federico Vecchi	All
(Italy) Scuderia Antonino	7	(Italy) Antonino Pellegrino	2-6
(Italy) Brixia Autosport	8	(Italy) Andrea Baiguera	2-6
(Slovenia) AK Plamtex Sport	10	(Slovenia) Jaka Marinsek	All
(Slovenia) AK Plamtex Sport	11	(Slovenia) Habjan Matevz	1-3, 6
(Italy) Viola Formula Racing	12	(Italy) Federico Gibbin	All
(Italy) Viola Formula Racing	14	(Italy) Francesco Frisone	All
(Italy) PSR Motorsport	15	(Italy) Alessandro Cisternino	1-4
(Italy) GSK Motorsport	16	(Italy) Federico Scionti	3-4
(Italy) GSK Motorsport	39	(Italy) Christian Mancinelli	6
(Italy) CG Motorsport	18	(Italy) Francesco Antonucci	1-2
(Italy) Team Torino Motorsport	22	(Italy) Patrick Gobbo	All
(Italy) Team Torino Motorsport	24	(Italy) Ettore Bassi	1-5
(Italy) Team Torino Motorsport	25	(Italy) Omar Mambretti	6
(Italy) Team Torino Motorsport	26	(Italy) Enrico Pison	All
(Italy) Team Torino Motorsport	28	(Italy) Andrea Cecchellero	All
(Italy) SG Motors	23	(Italy) Matteo Ciccaglioni	2-6
(Italy) Dynamic Engineering	38	(Italy) Paolo Viero	3-4
(Italy) Dynamic Engineering	39	(Italy) Christian Mancinelli	1-4
(Italy) Facondini Racing	39	(Italy) Christian Mancinelli	5
(Italy) GTR Racing	40	(Italy) Luca Spiga	3-4
(Italy) LP Motorsport Competition	71	(Italy) Laura Polidori	1-2, 4-6
Team Costa Rica / Facondini Racing	93	(Mexico) Luis Michael Dörrbecker	4

== Calendar ==
Round	Race	Circuit	Date	Pole position	Fastest lap	Winning driver	Winning team
1	R1	(Italy) Autodromo Enzo e Dino Ferrari	May 15	(Italy) Federico Vecchi	(Italy) Federico Vecchi	(Italy) Federico Vecchi	(Italy) CO2 Motorsport
1	R2	(Italy) Autodromo Enzo e Dino Ferrari	May 16		(Italy) Federico Vecchi	(Italy) Federico Vecchi	(Italy) CO2 Motorsport
2	R1	(Italy) ACI Vallelunga Circuit	May 30	(Italy) Andrea Cecchellero	(Italy) Andrea Cecchellero	(Italy) Andrea Cecchellero	(Italy) Team Torino Motorsport
2	R2	(Italy) ACI Vallelunga Circuit	May 30		(Italy) Federico Vecchi	(Italy) Antonino Pellegrino	(Italy) Scuderia Antonino
3	R1	(Italy) Autodromo Nazionale Monza	June 26	(Italy) Federico Scionti	(Italy) Federico Scionti	(Italy) Federico Gibbin	(Italy) Viola Formula Racing
3	R2	(Italy) Autodromo Nazionale Monza	June 27		(Italy) Federico Scionti	(Italy) Francesco Frisone	(Italy) Viola Formula Racing
4	R1	(Italy) Misano World Circuit	July 17	(Italy) Federico Vecchi	(Italy) Andrea Cecchellero	(Italy) Francesco Frisone	(Italy) Viola Formula Racing
4	R2	(Italy) Misano World Circuit	July 18		(Italy) Federico Gibbin	(Italy) Federico Vecchi	(Italy) CO2 Motorsport
5	R1	(Italy) Mugello Circuit	September 11	(Italy) Andrea Cecchellero	(Italy) Federico Vecchi	(Italy) Andrea Cecchellero	(Italy) Team Torino Motorsport
5	R2	(Italy) Mugello Circuit	September 12		(Italy) Francesco Frisone	(Italy) Federico Gibbin	(Italy) Viola Formula Racing
6	R1	(Italy) Autodromo Enzo e Dino Ferrari	October 10	(Italy) Federico Vecchi	(Italy) Federico Vecchi	(Italy) Francesco Frisone	(Italy) Viola Formula Racing
6	R2	(Italy) Autodromo Enzo e Dino Ferrari	October 10		(Italy) Omar Mambretti	(Italy) Christian Mancinelli	(Italy) GSK Motorsport

== Championship standings ==
Each championship round included 2 races by rounds length of 30 minutes each. Points were awarded as follows:

Position	1st	2nd	3rd	4th	5th	6th	7th	8th	9th	10th	11th	12th	13th	14th	15th
Points	32	28	24	22	20	18	16	14	12	10	8	6	4	2	1

In each race, 2 additional points were awarded for pole position, and 2 for fastest lap.

=== Drivers ===
Pos	Driver	(Italy) IMO		(Italy) VLL		(Italy) MNZ		(Italy) MIS		(Italy) MUG		(Italy) IMO		Points
Pos	Driver	1	2	3	4	5	6	7	8	9	10	11	12	Points
1	(Italy) Francesco Frisone	3	Ret	2	2	4	1	1	2	3	5	1	5	292
2	(Italy) Andrea Cecchellero	2	2	1	16	6	6	7	4	1	3	3	2	278
3	(Italy) Federico Vecchi	1	1	Ret	4	3	Ret	2	1	2	2	2	Ret	270
4	(Italy) Federico Gibbin	4	Ret	5	3	1	10	Ret	6	4	1	7	3	222
5	(Italy) Antonino Pellegrino			6	1	5	2	5	3	7	4	4	7	218
6	(Italy) Claudio Castiglioni	9	6	7	7	15	4	9	18	11	7	9	9	145
7	(Italy) Patrick Gobbo	5	4	16	15	Ret	9	13	9	6	8	5	6	141
8	(Italy) Christian Mancinelli	7	3	15	14	Ret	Ret	Ret	Ret	5	14	8	1	111
9	(Italy) Enrico Pison	10	Ret	8	10	7	Ret	8	10	14	10	6	DNS	86
10	(Slovenia) Jaka Marinšek	6	7	9	Ret	Ret	12	6	8	Ret	12	11	Ret	90
11	(Italy) Federico Scionti					2	7	3	5					94
12	(Slovenia) Matevz Habjan	11	9	12	11	11	3					10	8	66
13	(Italy) Edolo Ghirelli			4	8	9	Ret	14	13	10	6			82
14	(Italy) Matteo Ciccaglioni			3	Ret	8	Ret	10	Ret	9	Ret	14	11	60
15	(Italy) Laura Polidori	14	10	11	9			12	14	8	9	Ret	Ret	66
16	(Italy) Francesco Antonucci	12	5	10	5									56
17	(Italy) Andrea Baiguera			Ret	Ret	12	8	16	15	12	11	12	10	35
18	(Italy) Damiano Manni	8	8	13	6									50
19	(Italy) Luca Marco Spiga					10	5	11	12					44
20	(Italy) Vittorio Ghirelli							4	7					38
21	(Italy) Omar Mambretti											DSQ	4	24
22	(Italy) Ettore Bassi	13	Ret	17	12	14	13	Ret	16	13	13			24
23	(Italy) Alessandro Cisternino	Ret	11	14	13									14
24	(Italy) Paolo Viero					13	11	15	17					13
25	(Mexico) Luis Michael Dörrbecker							Ret	11					8

=== Teams ===
Pos	Team	Points
1	(Italy) Viola Formula Racing	514
2	(Italy) Team Torino Motorsport	441
3	(Italy) CO2 Motorsport	415
4	(Italy) Scuderia Antonino	218
5	(Slovenia) AK Plamtex Sport	188
6	(Italy) One Racing	170
7	(Italy) GSK Motorsport / TT Racing	140
8	(Italy) SG Motors	72
9	(Italy) LP Motorsport Competition	66
10	(Italy) Team Dynamic Engineering	56
11	(Italy) CG Motorsport	56
12	(Italy) Brixia Autosport	51
13	(Italy) GTR Racing	34
14	(Italy) Facondini Racing	22
15	(Italy) PSR Motorsport	14
16	Team Costa Rica / Facondini Racing	8
