= Davorin Štetner =

Entrepreneur, investor, international motorsport personality (born 1981)

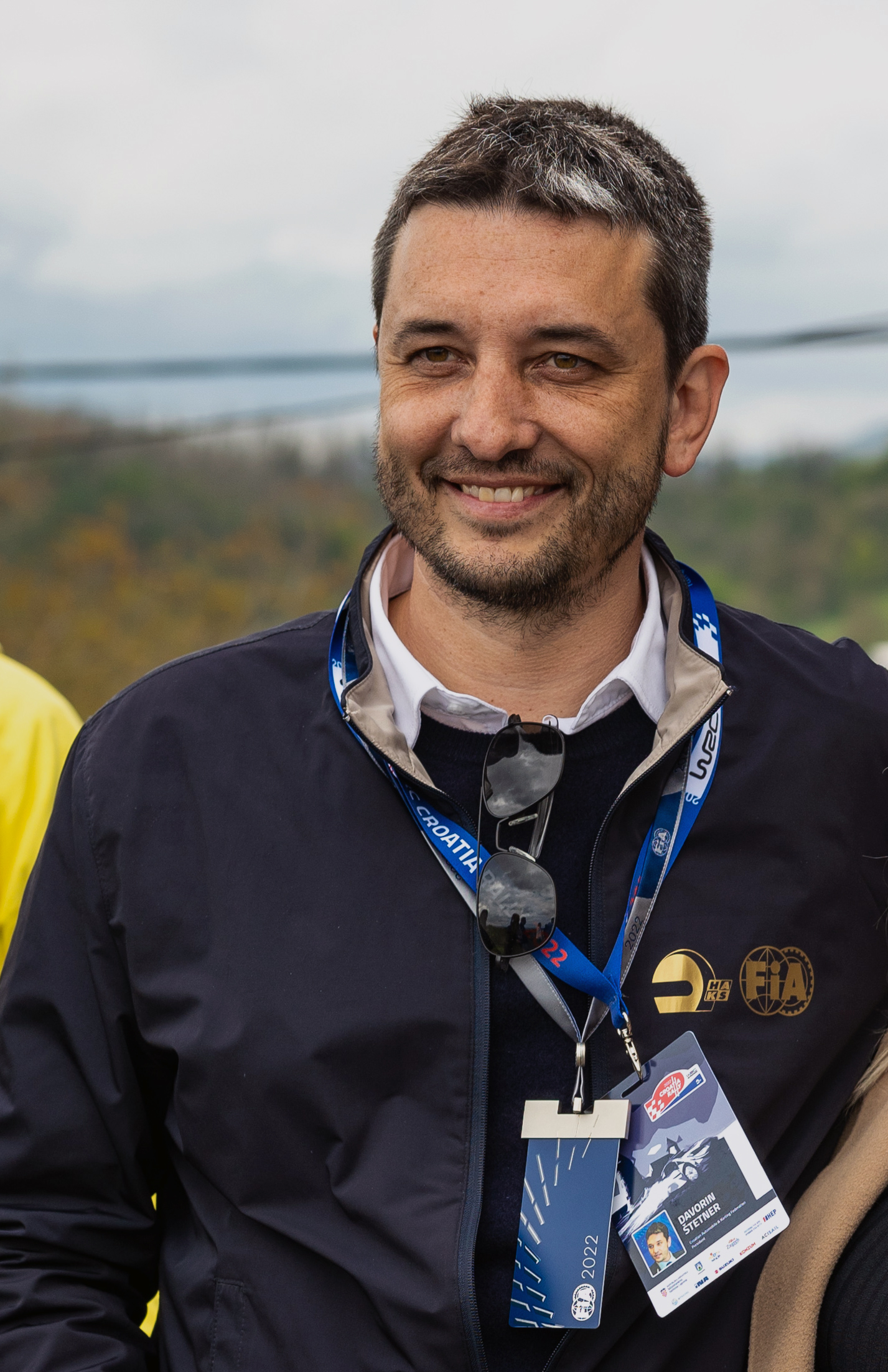
- Stetner in 2022
- Born: 10 November 1981 (age 44); Zagreb, Croatia
- Occupations: Entrepreneur; investor
- Title: - Founder & CEO, GP1 (TV channel); - President, Croatian Investors & Business Angels Association; - Member, Committee on the Economy of the Croatian Parliament; - President, AFNM

Davorin Štetner (born 10 November 1981) is a Croatian entrepreneur, investor and international motorsports personality. He is the founder and CEO of European TV network GP1 and has been a member of the Committee on the Economy of the Croatian Parliament since 2025. He was formerly the advisor to the first female President of the Republic of Croatia, Kolinda Grabar-Kitarović, from 2015 to 2020 and president of the national auto sport authority CAKF from 2019 to 2024. He is also a long-term member of the Fédération Internationale de l'Automobile and its bodies.

Štetner made a world breakthrough with the acquisition of Formula 1 media rights for Croatia in 2011 when he negotiated and signed a contract with Bernie Ecclestone, beating huge multinational companies. Then, at 29 years old, he became the world's youngest private F1 rights holder. As he later said – Formula 1 and the contacts and friendships he made there were his true breakthrough and lifetime value. He has been present in the Formula 1 Paddock since 2011.

== Office of the President of the Republic of Croatia 2015–2020 ==
In 2015, President of Croatia Kolinda Grabar-Kitarović appointed him to the Presidential Economic Council - her main advisory council for economic affairs. Štetner was on the council for five years until early 2020, when President Grabar-Kitarović was not reelected. During his time in office, he was described as loud and active in fighting for Entrepreneurs and creating a positive environment for foreign and domestic investors. His main focus was on promoting young entrepreneurs and startups and setting a better mentality toward those who are entering business. Štetner was a personal envoy to the President on many national and international occasions and events.

== Croatian parliament ==
Štetner was appointed to the committee on the economy of the Croatian parliament on 21.2.2025. Voting in the Croatian Parliament was 107 for.

== Notable investments ==
- GP1. Štetner is the founder and owner of the Central European Sports TV channel GP1 (TV channel). GP1 was founded in 2011 (under the name Kreator F1 and Kreator F1 HD) for broadcasting only Formula 1 on the biggest Croatian provider, Max TV - part of Croatian Telecom, as Štetner acquired exclusive Formula 1 media rights for Croatia. Kreator F1 was renamed to Kreator TV in 2013. In the following years, GP1 acquired MotoGP, Volvo Ocean Race and other media rights and started investing in its own broadcast facilities in Jastrebarsko, Croatia. As of June 2025, GP1 is present in all major IPTV and cable operators in Croatia, Slovenia, Bosnia & Herzegovina, along with the motorsport and F1 news portals in Central-Eastern Europe. GP1 made long-term deals with NASCAR Euro Series, and it is producing live broadcasts from some of the most famous racing tracks like Red Bull Ring, Hungaroring, Brands Hatch, Valencia, Slovakia Ring, Automotodrom Brno, Zolder and others.
- Tihočaj Estate. In 2019, he started investment in an Eco farm located in the almost abandoned village of Tihočaj in the Žumberak Nature Park in Croatia, where he bought about 250,000 square meters of land and old stone houses. Currently, there is Wagyu beef production there. Štetner hosted many guests at his property, including U.S. ambassador W. Robert Kohorst, Israeli ambassador Ilan Mor, and the location was a place of a farewell party for UK ambassador Andrew Dalgleish. In 2024. The Estate was the place of the CRANE Investment forum, which brought together Minister of Justice Damir Habijan, Minister of ecology Marija Vučković, and the ambassadors of the United States, the United Kingdom, Canada, Hungary and Israel, along with more than 150 investors and entrepreneurs. The main topics Štetner is addressing at his property are climate changes and deforestation, which affect the planet.
- CROATIA RING. On 7 June 2024, Index.hr published the news about investment in a Formula 1 level automotodrome "Croatia Ring" in central Croatia. Štetner confirmed the information was correct and revealed he and his partners had been working on this private project for three years prior. He aimed to finish the works in 2027 after the project was included on the List of strategic investment projects of the Republic of Croatia on 4 June 2024. Former Formula 1 champion Jacques Villeneuve was announced as an advisor to the project, and the project's architecture is under Tilke GmbH.

== Fédération Internationale de l'Automobile and motorsports ==
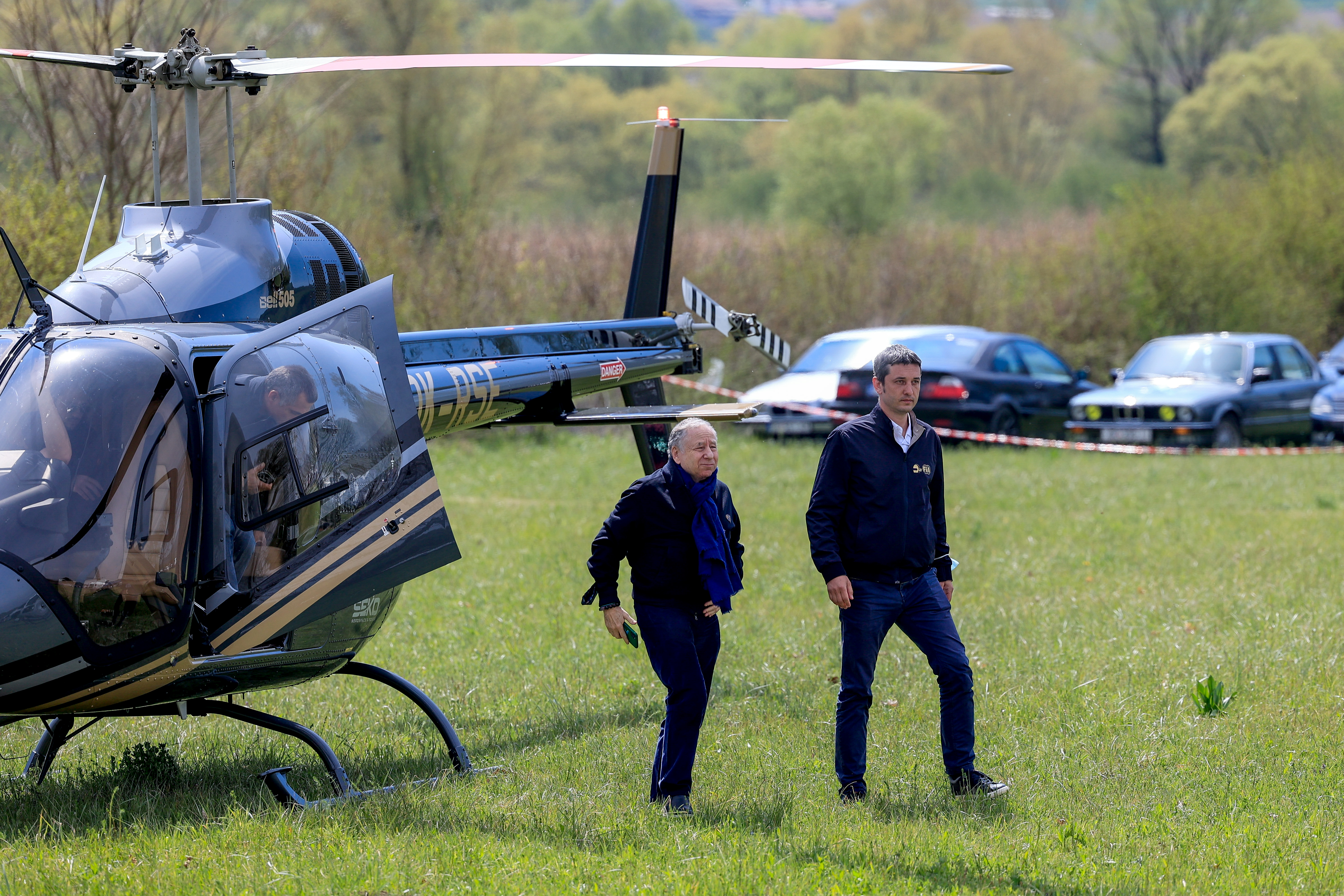
FIA president Jean Todt and Davorin Štetner at the FIA WRC 2021 Croatia Rally

Štetner entered the motorsports world in 2011, after acquiring F1 media rights for Croatia. In the same year, he started the Kreator Racing team with the goal of helping young motorsport talents. The team has drivers in Formula Renault Italia and the Karting Championship of Croatia. Kreator Racing is now one of the most successful motorsport teams in Croatia with more than 25 titles of the Champions (karting, motocross, Formula Renault Italia). In 2011, he accepted calls from the national autosport authority, CAKF and became a board member. In 2017, he was appointed deputy president, and in 2019, he was elected president for the first time and reelected in 2021. He held the role of president until the end of 2023. The main legacies of his presidency are financial consolidation and clearing the federation's debts. In 2024, he responded to a call from the Macedonian federation and was elected president of the ASN.

Štetner became a delegate in the Fédération Internationale de l'Automobile in 2019 and was appointed to the FIA ASN Development Task Force. This Task Force worked in managing and helping national federations (ASN's) to develop. In 2020, Štetner became a member of the FIA Digital Motor Sport working group, which began the preparations for digital sport to be recognised as a motorsport discipline. FIA Digital Motor Sport Working group was decommissioned at the end of 2020, when the new FIA eSports Commission (Formerly FIA Digital Motor Sport Commission) was introduced with Štetner as a member. He was on the commission until 2024.

Since 2019, he has been a member of the board of the FIA Central European Zone, which consists of 16 countries. In 2023, he was a member of the General Assembly of the Croatian Olympic Committee. He was one of the key people for bringing the FIA World Rally Championship to Croatia in 2021.

== Croatian Investors & Business Angels Association ==
In 2011, Štetner joined the Croatian Investors & Business Angels Association - CRANE - where he started to invest in startup companies. He first became a board member and became president in 2015; he is maintaining his third mandate in CRANE.

In 2018, he was elected a board member of the European Business Angels Network - EBAN and in 2020 was re-elected to this position. EBAN is one of the major Business Angels and investors unions in the world, and it is based in Brussels.

== Notable duties ==
He was a member of the Croatian Innovation Council appointed by the Croatian Minister of Economy in 2018. Štetner has been a member of many high-level conferences such as the Global Entrepreneurship Summit, the Dubrovnik Forum, and Wilton Park.

Štetner was an official participant of "The future of the UK's bilateral relationships in Europe" conference organised by Wilton Park - an executive agency of the UK Foreign and Commonwealth Office in 2018. The conference was held in Wiston House castle, West Sussex, with European representatives in: politics, business, academia, diplomacy, civil society and media, along with the British government. The main focus was on UK and European relations after Brexit.

On 28 April 2021, Štetner was elected to the executive committee of the Croatian Employers Association - HUP SME and on 6 July 2023 he was elected Deputy President with a two-year term.

Štetner is also a long-term jury member of the "Golden Key" Awards for the best Croatian exporter by the Union of the Croatian Exporters, Women in Adria for the best female entrepreneur and "Zlatna Kuna" - awards for the best Croatian companies by the Croatian Chamber of Commerce.

== Travels and Expeditions ==
Štetner has been part of many expeditions to remote parts of the World. He has travelled to more than 90 Countries and 6 continents. His trips have varied from filming documentaries in Ivory Coast after the Rebellion War, visiting Pygmy tribes in the jungles of Gabon and Cameroon, exploring Darien province in the Amazon, to living with Touaregs in the heart of the Sahara. Most of his dangerous trips were in his twenties and mid-thirties. He has written many articles and travelogues for Croatian media.

== Honors ==
- Award of the Prefect of the Varaždin County for outstanding contribution, Croatia, September 2022
- The World Bank's recognition for the digitalisation of the company's founding process in Croatia
- Special award of the TV Auto Magazine TV show for outstanding contribution
- Award of the Zagreb Automobile Federation for outstanding contribution, December 2019
- Special Award "Break the mould" of the European Business Angels Network - EBAN, November 2016
