= Francesco Bracotti =

Italian racing driver (born 1995)

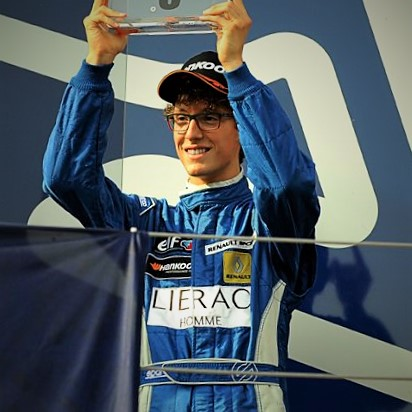
- Francesco Bracotti in 2012
- Nationality: (Italy) Italian
- Born: January 16, 1995 (age 31) Turin (Italy)

Formula Renault 2.0 Italia career
- Debut season: 2012
- Current team: Green Goblin by Facondini
- Car number: 21
- Wins: 0
- Poles: 0
- Fastest laps: 1
- Best finish: 7th in 2012

Francesco Bracotti (born January 16, 1995, in Turin, Italy) is a professional racing driver from Italy who competes in single seaters.

== Racing career ==
=== Karting ===
Bracotti was four years old when he tasted the asphalt the first time, on the go-kart circuit of Cattolica. After years of amateur experiences between 50 babykart and 60 minikart, he jumped to 100 junior category and started doing in 2008 the Piedmont regional championship, ending it in the first position. In 2009, he took part to the Open Masters in the KF3 category and in some races of the WSK championship. He also participated in prestigious international events as Margutti and Industries trophies. In 2010, he became an official driver of the Tecno Kart team and took part in the World Championship U-18 established by FIA. Here, he stood out with its capacities, in particular on the Spanish circuit of Aragon. In 2011, again as a bearer of Tecno Kart he took part to the European Championship in Kf2 and, as the previous year, in the World Championship U-18.

=== Formula Renault 2.0 ===
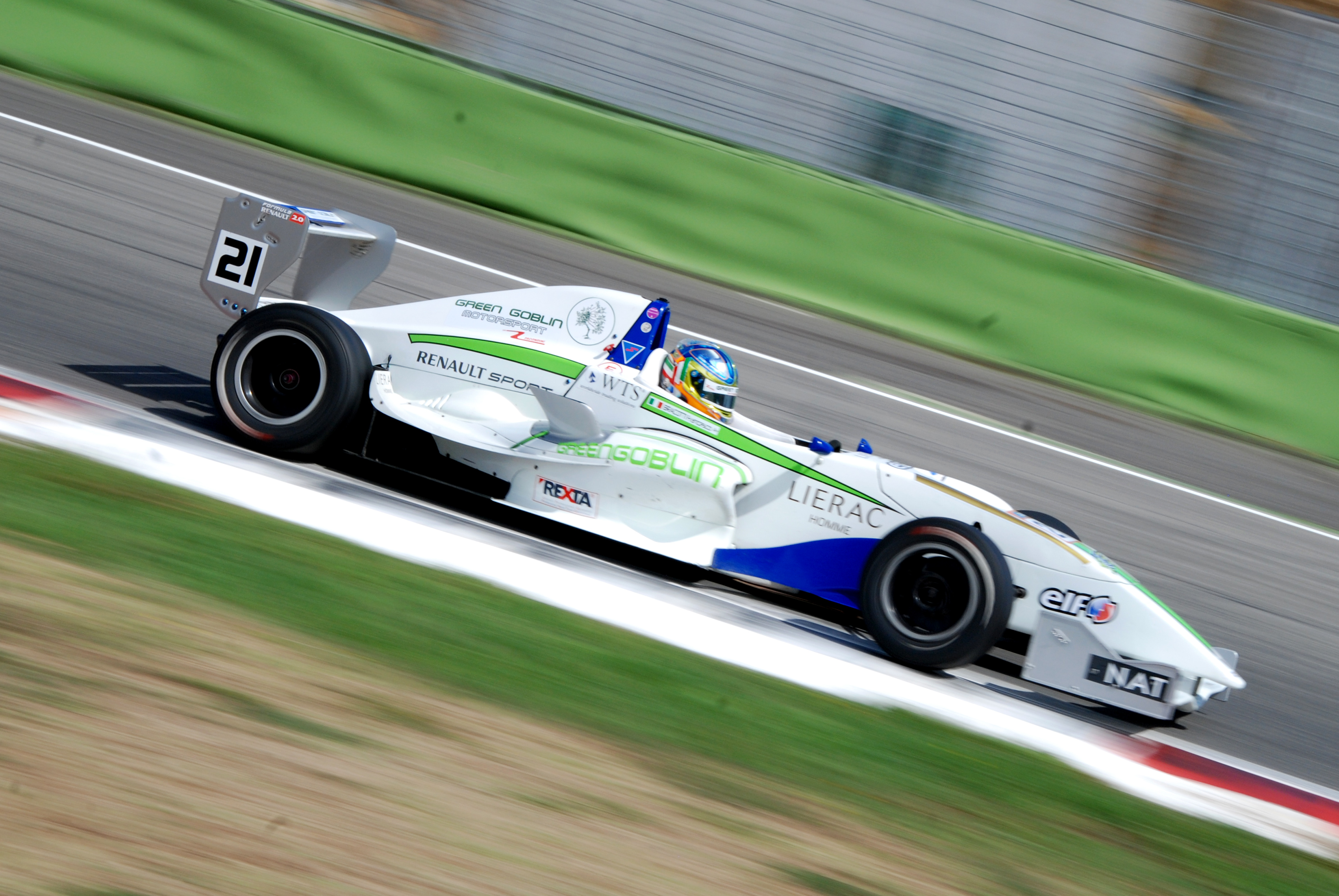
Bracotti in Formula Renault 2.0

In 2012, Bracotti started his single seaters career taking part in the Italian Formula Renault 2.0 championship as a driver of the team “Green Goblin by Facondini”. In Monza, the first meeting of the championship, he achieved a seventh and fourth place, the same placement in which he ended the first of the two races in Imola, where he also obtained the fastest lap. Bracotti achieved his first podium at the Red Bull Ring in the second of the two races of the weekend. He finished the first race in fifth place, despite starting from the pit lane because of a technical failure, after having obtained the third position in qualifying. The round in Vallelunga was signed by two retires for Bracotti, who started from the first row in race-1 and was coinvolved in an accident at "cimini" corner. In race-2, a technical failure to the rear suspension forced him to stop the car. At the end of the championship, another retirement, caused by engine problems, in Mugello Circuit made him finish fourth in the junior ranking.

== Racing Records ==
=== Career summary ===
Season	Series	Team	Races	Retires	Poles	F.L.	Wins	Podiums	Points	Position
2012	Formula Renault 2.0 Italia	Green Goblin by Facondini	12	4	0	1	0	1	80	7th

=== Formula Renault 2.0 results ===
Year	Entrant	1	2	3	4	5	6	7	8	9	10	11	12	Rank	Points
2012	Green Goblin by Facondini	ITA; MONZA; 7°	ITA; MONZA; 4°	SMR; IMOLA; 4° (F.L.)	SMR; IMOLA; 6°	ITA; MISANO; Ret	ITA; MISANO; 5°	AUS; SPIELBERG; 5°	AUS; SPIELBERG; 3°	ITA; VALLELUNGA; Ret	ITA; VALLELUNGA; Ret	ITA; MUGELLO; 7°	ITA; MUGELLO; Ret	7th	80
