= Michele Bartyan =

Austrian-Italian racing driver (born 1980)

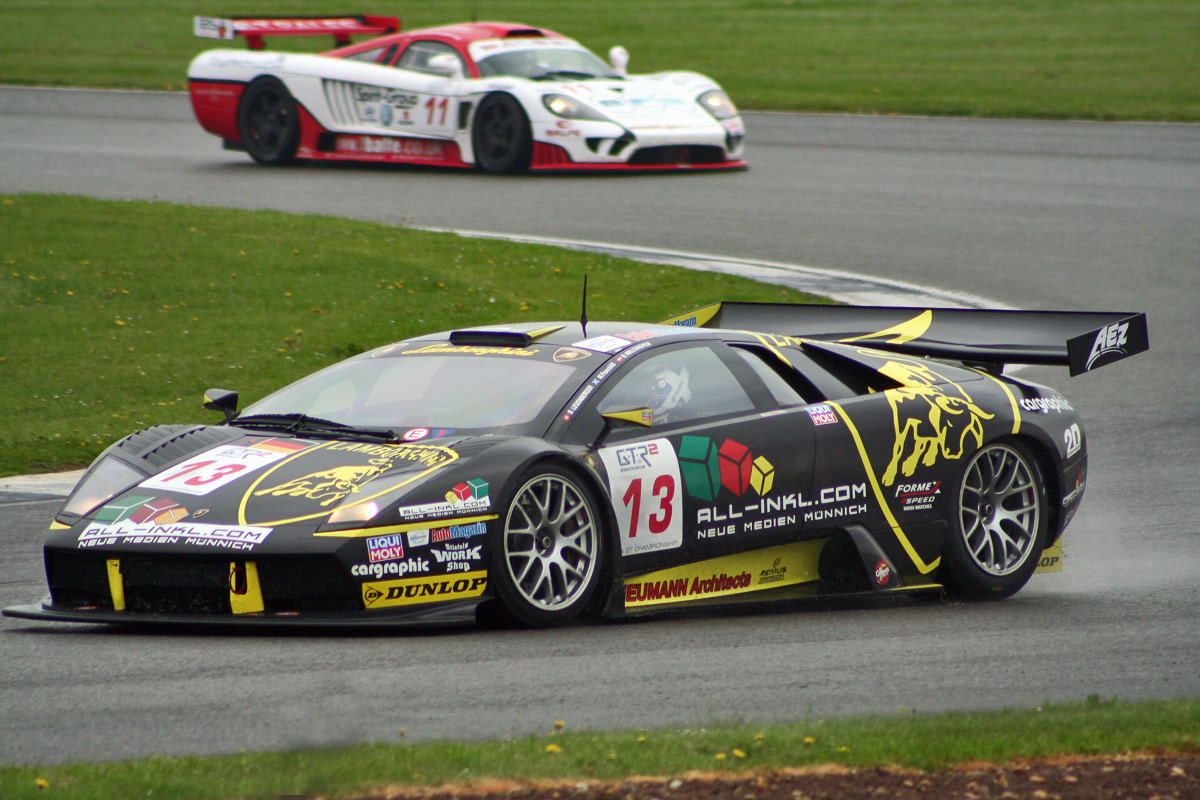
- Bartyan in 2006
- Nationality: (Italy) Italian (Austria) Austrian
- Born: 23 June 1980 (age 46) Lodi, Italy

International GT Open career
- Teams: Playteam SaraFree
- Starts: 11
- Wins: 3
- Podiums: 5
- Poles: 3
- Best finish: 1st in 2006

Championship titles
- 2006 2006 2005: International GT Open - GTA; Spanish GT Championship - GTA; Le Mans Endurance Series - LMGT1

Michele Bartyan (born 23 June 1980) is an Italian and Austrian former racing driver who last competed in the International GT Open for Playteam SaraFree. He was the LMGT1 champion in the 2005 Le Mans Endurance Series season and claimed dual championships in the Spanish GT Championship and International GT Open for Playteam SaraFree.

== Racing record ==
=== Career summary ===
Season	Series	Team	Races	Wins	Poles	F/Laps	Podiums	Points	Position
2002	Formula Renault 2000 Italia	Cram Competition	9	0	0	0	0	2	27th
2002	Formula Renault 2000 Italia Winter		4	0	0	?	2	44	4th
2003	Formula Renault 2.0 Fran-Am Winter World Championship	Team Italia	5	0	0	0	0	133	4th
2004	European Touring Car Championship - Independent	Oregon Team	19	1	0	0	4	76	5th
2005	Le Mans Endurance Series - LMGT1	BMS Scuderia Italia	5	2	0	0	4	35	**1st**
2005	Italian GT Championship - GT2	BMS Scuderia Italia	12	2	2	4	8	151	**3rd**
2005	24 Hours of Le Mans - LMGT1	BMS Scuderia Italia	1	0	0	0	0	N/A	DNF
2006	FIA GT Championship - GT1	B-Racing RS Line Team	1	0	0	0	0	0	NC
2006	Spanish GT Championship - GTA	Playteam SaraFree	?	?	?	?	?	65	**1st**
2006	International GT Open - GTA	Playteam SaraFree	11	3	3	?	5	76	**1st**
2007	Italian GT Championship - GT3	BMS Scuderia Italia	2	0	0	0	2	?	?
2017	24H Series - A3	PB Racing	1	0	0	0	0	N/A	NC

=== Complete European Touring Car Championship results ===
(key) (Races in bold indicate pole position) (Races in italics indicate fastest lap)

Year	Team	Car	Class	1	2	3	4	5	6	7	8	9	10	11	12	13	14	15	16	17	18	19	20	DC	Pts
2004	Oregon Team	Alfa Romeo 156 GTA	I	MNZ; 1; 20	MNZ; 2; 11	VAL; 1 Ret	VAL; 2 DNS	MAG; 1; 9	MAG; 2; 12	HOC; 1; 14	HOC; 2; 16	BRN; 1; 20	BRN; 2; 13	DON; 1; 18	DON; 2; 12	SPA; 1; 20	SPA; 2; 17	IMO; 1; 14	IMO; 2; 7	OSC; 1; 18	OSC; 2; 18	DUB; 1; 16	DUB; 2; 8	5th	76

=== Complete Le Mans Endurance Series results ===
(key) (Races in bold indicate pole position) (Races in italics indicate fastest lap)

Year	Team	Class	Car	Engine	1	2	3	4	5	DC	Points
2005	BMS Scuderia Italia	GT1	Ferrari 550-GTS Maranello	Ferrari F133 5.9 L V12	SPA; 3	MNZ; 1	SIL; 6	NÜR; 3	IST; 1	1st	35

=== Complete 24 Hours of Le Mans results ===
Year	Team	Co-Drivers	Car	Class	Laps	Pos.	Class Pos.
2005	(Italy) BMS Scuderia Italia	(Italy) Matteo Malucelli (Switzerland) Toni Seiler	Ferrari 550-GTS Maranello	GT1	60	DNF	DNF

=== Complete FIA GT Championship results ===
(key) (Races in bold indicate pole position) (Races in italics indicate fastest lap)

Year	Team	Car	Class	1	2	3	4	5	6	7	8	9	10	Pos.	Pts
2006	B-Racing RS Line Team	Lamborghini Murciélago R-GT	GT1	SIL	BRN	OSC; 9	SPA	PRI	DIJ	MUG	HUN	ADR	DUB	NC	0
