= 2002 Formula Renault 2000 Italia =

Motor racing competition

Seasons
- ← 2001 2003 →

The 2002 Formula Renault 2000 Italia season was the third season of the Formula Renault 2000 Italia championship. It was won by José María López driving for Cram Competition. He and main rival Robert Kubica of RC Motorsport, both took four wins each.

== Drivers and Teams ==
2002 Entry List
Team	No.	Driver name	Rounds
(Italy) Prema Powerteam	1	(France) Franck Perera	All
(Italy) Prema Powerteam	2	(Sweden) Alexander Storckenfeldt	All
(Italy) Birel Formula	3	(Italy) Angelo Marchesini	All
(Italy) Birel Formula	4	(Italy) Alessandro Pier Guidi	All
(Italy) Birel Formula	5	(Italy) Emanuele Priull	1-3
(Italy) Birel Formula	51	(Italy) Arcangelo Priulla	5, 7
(Italy) M&C Motosport	6	(Italy) Mario Esposito	1, 4-6, 8-10
(Italy) RP Motorsport	7	(Finland) Toni Vilander	2-10
(Italy) RP Motorsport	8	(Italy) Marco Bonanomi	All
(Italy) RP Motorsport	9	(Italy) Giovanni Berton	1, 6, 8
(Italy) Cram Competition	11	(Italy) Michele Rugolo	1
(Italy) Cram Competition	12	(Italy) Michele Bartyan	All
(Italy) Cram Competition	18	(France) Damien Pasini	6, 8
(Italy) Cram Competition	19	(Brazil) Roberto Streit	1-9
(Italy) Cram Competition	36	(Italy) Matteo Cressoni	4-7
(Italy) Cram Competition	37	(Argentina) José María López	All
(Italy) Cram Competition	58	(Italy) Alessio Farnese	2-3
(Italy) Cram Competition	77	(Portugal) Lourenço Beirão da Veiga	9
(Italy) BVM Minardi Jnr.	14	(Argentina) Juan Martin Ponte	All
(Italy) BVM Minardi Jnr.	15	(Italy) Matteo Malucelli	1-6
(Italy) BVM Minardi Jnr.	16	(Greece) Stamatis Katsimis	All
(Italy) BVM Minardi Jnr.	73	(Italy) Mauro Contu	9
(Italy) Drumel Motorsport	21	(San Marino) Christian Montanari	All
(Italy) Drumel Motorsport	22	(Italy) Davide Di Benedetto	All
(Italy) Drumel Motorsport	23	(Italy) Matteo Meneghello	All
(Italy) Drumel Motorsport	24	(Italy) Andrea Scafuro	All
(Italy) AFC Motorsport	25	(Italy) Nicola Gianniberti	1-3, 5-6, 8-10
(Italy) RC Motorsport	26	(Brazil) Carlos Pereira	All
(Italy) RC Motorsport	27	(Poland) Robert Kubica	All
(Italy) RC Motorsport	35	(Brazil) Fernando Rees	2-9
(Italy) RC Motorsport	74	(Brazil) Paulo Bueno	1
(Austria) Renauer Motorsport	28	(Austria) Hannes Gsell	1
(Italy) Facondini Racing	31	(Venezuela) Giancarlo Serenelli	1
(Italy) Facondini Racing	32	(Italy) Matteo Pellegrino	1-6, 8
(Italy) Facondini Racing	55	(Netherlands) Nicky Pastorelli	2-4
(Italy) Facondini Racing	56	(Brazil) Rodrigo Bernardes	4
(Italy) Facondini Racing	78	(Italy) Andrea Garutti	9
(Italy) Facondini Racing	79	(Netherlands) Olivier Tielemans	9
(Italy) Scuderia Veregra	33	(Italy) Alexio Lattanzi	All
(Italy) Scuderia Veregra	34	(United Kingdom) Colin Brown	All
(Italy) Scuderia Veregra	47	(Brazil) Vanderlan de Souza Jr.	1
(Italy) Scuderia Veregra	49	(Italy) Angelo Calisti	5
(Italy) Scuderia Veregra	57	(Italy) Sauro Cesetti	6, 8
(Italy) Scuderia Veregra	76	(Italy) Daniele Cardinali	9
(Italy) Bicar Racing	35	(Brazil) Fernando Rees	1
(Italy) Bicar Racing	36	(Italy) Matteo Cressoni	1-3
(Italy) Bicar Racing	59	(Italy) Andrea Viola	6
(Italy) Vomero Racing Sport Promotion	38	(Italy) Antonio Lubrano	1-6, 8-10
(Italy) Vomero Racing Sport Promotion	71	(Italy) Giacomo Vargiu	6-7
(Italy) Toby Racing	39	(Italy) Stefano Gattuso	All
(Italy) Toby Racing	48	(Italy) Luigi Ferrara	2-9
(Italy) Durango	41	(South Africa) Stephen Simpson	1, 4, 6
(Italy) Durango	42	(Italy) Ferdinando Monfardini	1, 4, 6
(Italy) Euronova Junior Team	43	(United Kingdom) James Kirkpatrick	1-8
(Italy) Euronova Junior Team	44	(Italy) Alessandro Tonoli	All
(Italy) Euronova Junior Team	99	(Italy) Roberto Toninelli	9-10
(Italy) ADM Junior Team	45	(Belgium) Mike den Tandt	1, 4, 6, 8
(Italy) ADM Junior Team	46	(Belgium) Grégory Franchi	1, 4, 6, 8-9
(Italy) ADM Junior Team	75	(Brazil) André Prioste	9-10
(Italy) Alan Racing Team	52	(Italy) Mauro Massironi	All
(Switzerland) Jenzer Motorsport	53	(Switzerland) Giorgio Mondini	4
(Switzerland) Jenzer Motorsport	54	(Switzerland) Neel Jani	4
(Italy) System Team	72	(Switzerland) Matteo Umiker	7

== Calendar ==
Round	Circuit	Date	Pole position	Fastest lap	Winning driver	Winning team
1	(Italy) ACI Vallelunga Circuit	April 7	(Poland) Robert Kubica	(Poland) Robert Kubica	(Poland) Robert Kubica	(Italy) RC Motorsport
2	(Italy) Autodromo di Pergusa	May 25	(Poland) Robert Kubica	(Poland) Robert Kubica	(Poland) Robert Kubica	(Italy) RC Motorsport
3	(Italy) Autodromo di Pergusa	May 26	(Italy) Luigi Ferrara	(Poland) Robert Kubica	(Italy) Luigi Ferrara	(Italy) Toby Racing
4	(Belgium) Circuit de Spa-Francorchamps	June 9	(Argentina) José María López	(Argentina) José María López	(Poland) Robert Kubica	(Italy) RC Motorsport
5	(Italy) Autodromo dell'Umbria	June 16	(Argentina) José María López	(Brazil) Roberto Streit	(Brazil) Roberto Streit	(Italy) Cram Competition
6	(Italy) Autodromo Nazionale Monza	July 7	(Argentina) José María López	(Argentina) José María López	(Argentina) José María López	(Italy) Cram Competition
7	(Italy) Autodromo Riccardo Paletti	July 21	(Argentina) José María López	(Argentina) José María López	(Argentina) José María López	(Italy) Cram Competition
8	(Italy) Autodromo Enzo e Dino Ferrari	September 1	(Italy) Davide Di Benedetto	(Poland) Robert Kubica	(Poland) Robert Kubica	(Italy) RC Motorsport
9	(Italy) Misano World Circuit	September 29	(Argentina) José María López	(Argentina) José María López	(Argentina) José María López	(Italy) Cram Competition
10	(Italy) Mugello Circuit	October 6	(Poland) Robert Kubica	(Poland) Robert Kubica	(Argentina) José María López	(Italy) Cram Competition

== Championship standings ==
Points are awarded to the drivers as follows:

Position	1	2	3	4	5	6	7	8	9	10	PP	FL
Points	30	24	20	16	12	10	8	6	4	2	2	2

=== Drivers ===
Pos	Driver	VLL (Italy)	PER (Italy)		SPA (Belgium)	MGI (Italy)	MNZ (Italy)	VAR (Italy)	IMO (Italy)	MIS (Italy)	MUG (Italy)	Points
Pos	Driver	1	2	3	4	5	6	7	8	9	10	Points
1	(Argentina) José María López	13	Ret	2	3	3	1	1	5	1	1	205
2	(Poland) Robert Kubica	1	1	6	1	6	3	Ret	1	25	3	188
3	(Italy) Davide Di Benedetto	12	4	3	5	4	2	5	2	6	4	152
4	(Brazil) Roberto Streit	2	12	9	28	1	7	4	9	3		108
5	(Finland) Toni Vilander		9	10	11	2	4	7	10	4	2	96
6	(San Marino) Christian Montanari	6	23	8	24	5	Ret	3	Ret	2	6	82
7	(Brazil) Carlos Pereira	3	3	Ret	8	Ret	13	6	4	29	8	78
8	(France) Franck Perera	14	7	22	WD	Ret	Ret	2	3	5	5	76
9	(Italy) Luigi Ferrara		2	1	13	Ret	DNQ	Ret	11	12	14	55
10	(Belgium) Mike den Tandt	4			2		Ret		7			48
11	(Italy) Matteo Meneghello	28	5	5	12	Ret	8	20	13	9	7	42
12	(Sweden) Alexander Storckenfeldt	7	Ret	Ret	16	7	10	Ret	12	7	9	30
13	(Italy) Andrea Scafuro	10	26	7	7	16	Ret	Ret	8	31	Ret	24
14	(Italy) Nicola Gianniberti	Ret	17	4		8	Ret		30	26	21	22
15	(Italy) Marco Bonanomi	30	18	26	Ret	11	5	13	6	14	20	22
16	(Argentina) Juan Martin Ponte	29	8	Ret	Ret	Ret	9	8	14	27	12	17
17	(Switzerland) Neel Jani				4							16
18	(Italy) Alessandro Pier Guidi	9	Ret	27	15	14	6	12	16	Ret	16	14
19	(Italy) Matteo Malucelli	5	Ret	14	20	Ret	DNQ					12
20	(Italy) Matteo Cressoni	19	6	20	Ret	Ret	11	11	Ret	30	10	12
21	(Netherlands) Nicky Pastorelli		10	Ret	6							12
22	(Italy) Matteo Pellegrino	26	25	11	9	9	Ret		19			8
23	(Italy) Roberto Toninelli									8	11	6
24	(South Africa) Stephen Simpson	8			14		16					6
25	(Italy) Alexio Lattanzi	20	Ret	Ret	Ret	DNQ	22	9	25	22	Ret	4
26	(United Kingdom) Colin Brown	16	19	24	Ret	10	Ret	16	Ret	10	22	4
27	(Italy) Michele Bartyan	DNQ	24	13	21	12	18	10	26	11	15	2
28	(Italy) Ferdinando Monfardini	27			10		Ret					2
29	(Italy) Alessandro Tonoli	15	11	15	22	DNQ	14	17	Ret	Ret	Ret	0
30	(Italy) Michele Rugolo	11										0
31	(Brazil) Fernando Rees	18	Ret	12	23	13	DNQ	14	29	23		0
32	(Italy) Mauro Massironi	25	13	17	19	15	12	Ret	20	18	Ret	0
33	(Greece) Stamatis Katsimis	Ret	20	16	17	Ret	15	15	28	24	13	0
34	(Belgium) Grégory Franchi	DNQ			27		DNQ		18	13		0
35	(Italy) Alessio Farnese		14	19								0
36	(Italy) Antonio Lubrano	DNQ	16	Ret	Ret	DNQ	DNQ		22	15	19	0
37	(France) Damien Pasini						20		15			0
38	(Italy) Angelo Marchesini	DNQ	15	23	26	DNQ	DNQ	DNQ	27	21	Ret	0
39	(Brazil) André Prioste									16	17	0
40	(Italy) Giovanni Berton	17					Ret		17			0
41	(Italy) Giacomo Vargiu						17	DNQ				0
42	(Italy) Mauro Contu									17		0
43	(Italy) Stefano Gattuso	DNQ	22	25	Ret	DNQ	DNQ	18	24	28	18	0
44	(Italy) Emanuele Priulla	DNQ	Ret	18								0
45	(Brazil) Rodrigo Bernardes				18							0
46	(Italy) Arcangelo Priulla					DNQ		19				0
47	(Italy) Andrea Viola						19					0
48	(Italy) Andrea Garutti									19		0
49	(Italy) Daniele Cardinali									20		0
50	(United Kingdom) James Kirkpatrick	24	21	21	25	DNQ	21	Ret	23			0
51	(Italy) Sauro Cesetti						DNQ		21			0
52	(Brazil) Paulo Bueno	21										0
53	(Austria) Hannes Gsell	22										0
54	(Brazil) Vanderlan de Souza Jr.	23										0
55	(Switzerland) Giorgio Mondini				29							0
56	(Italy) Mario Esposito	DNQ			Ret	DNQ	DNQ		31	Ret	Ret	0
57	(Netherlands) Olivier Tielemans									32		0
	(Portugal) Lourenço Beirão da Veiga									Ret		
	(Venezuela) Giancarlo Serenelli	DNQ										
	(Italy) Angelo Calisti					DNQ						
	(Switzerland) Matteo Umiker							DNQ				
