= 2011 Formula Renault 2.0 Italia =

Motor racing competition

Seasons
- ← 2010 2012 →

The 2011 Formula Renault 2.0 Italia season was the twelfth season of the Formula Renault 2.0 Italia Andrea Boffo won the competition, taking home three wins. Team Torino Motorsport won the team championship.

== Drivers and Teams ==
2011 Entry List
Team	No.	Driver name	Rounds
(Italy) Viola Formula Racing	1	(Italy) Nicola De Val	All
(Italy) Viola Formula Racing	2	(Italy) Stefano De Val	All
(Italy) Viola Formula Racing	3	(Italy) Emanuele Piva	2-3, 5-6
(Italy) Winner Motorsport	5	(Italy) Simone Taloni	2-6
(Italy) CO2 Motorsport	6	(Italy) Matteo Pollini	6
(Italy) CO2 Motorsport	17	(Italy) Pierluigi Veronesi	1-3
(Italy) CO2 Motorsport	18	(Italy) Claudio Castiglioni	1-3, 5-6
(Italy) CO2 Motorsport	73	(Italy) Andrea Baiguera	1-3, 5-6
(Italy) TS Corse	7	(Italy) Pietro Peccenini	5
(Italy) TS Corse	21	(Italy) Stefano Turchetto	5
(Italy) SG Motors	8	(Italy) Matteo Ciccaglioni	1-3, 5
(Italy) GSK Motorsport	11	(Italy) Tommaso Menchini	1-5
(Italy) GSK Motorsport	11	(Italy) Gianluca Cane	3
(Italy) GSK Motorsport	39	(Italy) Christian Mancinelli	All
(Italy) GSK Motorsport	44	(Italy) Angelo Mezzatesta	3
(Italy) GSK Motorsport	55	(Italy) Luca Defendi	4-6
(Italy) GSK Motorsport	69	(Italy) Emanuele Mari	2
Team Costa Rica / Facondini Racing	11	(Italy) Tommaso Menchini	6
Team Costa Rica / Facondini Racing	12	(Mexico) Luis Michael Dörrbecker	1-5
Team Costa Rica / Facondini Racing	14	(Mexico) Juan Carlos Sistos	2-3
Team Costa Rica / Facondini Racing	15	(Panama) Gianni Alessandria	6
Team Costa Rica / Facondini Racing	16	(Venezuela) Valeria Carballo	All
Team Costa Rica / Facondini Racing	20	(Costa Rica) James Adams	1
(Italy) Team Torino Motorsport	12	(Mexico) Luis Michael Dörrbecker	6
(Italy) Team Torino Motorsport	19	(Italy) Kevin Gilardoni	5
(Italy) Team Torino Motorsport	22	(Italy) Patrick Gobbo	1-3
(Italy) Team Torino Motorsport	24	(Italy) Andrea Boffo	All
(Italy) Team Torino Motorsport	26	(Italy) Gabriele Larini	3, 6
(Italy) Team Torino Motorsport	28	(Canada) David Richert	2, 5
(Italy) Team Torino Motorsport	33	(Italy) Omar Mambretti	All
(Italy) AP Motorsport	27	(Italy) Luca Mingotti	2, 5
(Italy) Facondini Racing	44	(Italy) Angelo Mezzatesta	1-2
(Italy) MG Motorsport	46	(Italy) Alberto Agresta	2-6
(France) GTRO	48	(France) Christian Ruiz	2
(France) GTRO	49	(France) Michel Mora	2
(France) GTRO	50	(France) Gilles Charpentier	2
(France) GTRO	51	(France) Hervé Clément	2
(Italy) LP Motorsport Competition	71	(Italy) Laura Polidori	3

== Calendar ==
Round	Race	Circuit	Date	Pole position	Fastest lap	Winning driver	Winning team
1	R1	(Italy) Autodromo Nazionale Monza	March 26	(Italy) Nicola De Val	(Italy) Christian Mancinelli	(Italy) Christian Mancinelli	(Italy) GSK Motorsport
1	R2	(Italy) Autodromo Nazionale Monza	March 27		(Italy) Nicola De Val	(Italy) Andrea Boffo	(Italy) Team Torino Motorsport
2	R1	(Italy) Autodromo Enzo e Dino Ferrari	May 8	(Italy) Luca Mingotti	(Italy) Nicola De Val	(Italy) Matteo Ciccaglioni	(Italy) SG Motors
2	R2	(Italy) Autodromo Enzo e Dino Ferrari	May 8		(Italy) Stefano De Val	(Italy) Christian Mancinelli	(Italy) GSK Motorsport
3	R1	(Italy) Mugello Circuit	May 29	(Italy) Pierluigi Veronesi	(Italy) Christian Mancinelli	(Italy) Christian Mancinelli	(Italy) GSK Motorsport
3	R2	(Italy) Mugello Circuit	May 29		(Italy) Andrea Boffo	(Italy) Omar Mambretti	(Italy) Team Torino Motorsport
4	R1	(Austria) Red Bull Ring	June 11	(Italy) Andrea Boffo	(Italy) Andrea Boffo	(Italy) Andrea Boffo	(Italy) Team Torino Motorsport
4	R2	(Austria) Red Bull Ring	June 12		(Italy) Stefano De Val	(Italy) Nicola De Val	(Italy) Viola Formula Racing
5	R1	(Italy) Misano World Circuit	July 24	(Italy) Andrea Boffo	(Italy) Christian Mancinelli	(Italy) Christian Mancinelli	(Italy) GSK Motorsport
5	R2	(Italy) Misano World Circuit	July 24		(Italy) Stefano Turchetto	(Italy) Andrea Boffo	(Italy) Team Torino Motorsport
6	R1	(Italy) Autodromo Riccardo Paletti	September 24	(Italy) Christian Mancinelli	(Italy) Andrea Boffo	(Italy) Christian Mancinelli	(Italy) GSK Motorsport
6	R2	(Italy) Autodromo Riccardo Paletti	September 25		(Italy) Stefano De Val	(Italy) Stefano De Val	(Italy) Viola Formula Racing

== Championship standings ==
Each championship round included 2 races by rounds length of 30 minutes each. Points were awarded as follows:

Position	1st	2nd	3rd	4th	5th	6th	7th	8th	9th	10th	11th	12th	13th	14th	15th
Points	32	28	24	22	20	18	16	14	12	10	8	6	4	2	1

In each race, 2 additional points were awarded for pole position, and 2 for fastest lap.

=== Drivers ===
Pos	Driver	(Italy) MNZ		(Italy) IMO		(Italy) MUG		(Austria) RBR		(Italy) MIS		(Italy) VAR		Points
Pos	Driver	1	2	3	4	5	6	7	8	9	10	11	12	Points
1	(Italy) Andrea Boffo	7	1	4	3	4	4	1	5	2	1	4	5	302
2	(Italy) Omar Mambretti	2	11	2	2	5	1	4	7	5	2	3	4	276
3	(Italy) Christian Mancinelli	1	Ret	6	1	1	17	5	2	1	13	1	2	266
4	(Italy) Tommaso Menchini	6	4	3	4	3	3	2	4	Ret	Ret	2	7	228
5	(Italy) Nicola De Val	3	3	22	5	7	13	3	1	4	6	7	6	224
6	(Italy) Stefano De Val	4	12	5	7	Ret	9	8	6	6	Ret	5	1	184
7	(Italy) Simone Taloni			8	10	6	2	9	Ret	9	5	8	9	140
8	(Italy) Alberto Agresta			7	9	2	Ret			Ret	7	6	3	114
9	(Mexico) Luis Michael Dörrbecker	8	13	15	Ret	11	6	6	3	Ret	12	10	Ret	103
10	(Italy) Patrick Gobbo	5	2	9	11	8	7							98
11	(Italy) Claudio Maria Castiglioni	Ret	7	Ret	13	9	5			7	8	9	14	96
12	(Italy) Emanuele Piva			13	6	10	10			10	4	15	10	85
13	(Italy) Matteo Ciccaglioni	9	14	1	15	Ret	8			Ret	16			61
14	(Italy) Luca Defendi							7	8	14	11	Ret	8	54
15	(Italy) Andrea Baiguera	11	10	21	16	13	11			11	Ret	13	Ret	42
16	(Italy) Angelo Mezzatesta	12	8	11	Ret	12	12							40
17	(Venezuela) Valeria Carballo	13	9	Ret	18	16	DNS	Ret	Ret	8	Ret	Ret	11	38
18	(Italy) Pierluigi Veronesi	Ret	5	14	12	Ret	15							31
19	(Italy) Luca Mingotti			10	8					15	14			29
20	(Costa Rica) James Adams	10	6											28
21	(Italy) Stefano Turchetto									3	15			27
22	(Italy) Kevin Gilardoni									Ret	3			24
23	(Italy) Pietro Peccenini									12	9			18
24	(Canada) David Richert			16	20					13	10			14
25	(Italy) Matteo Pollini											11	12	14
26	(Italy) Gabriele Larini					15	Ret					12	13	11
27	(Mexico) Juan Carlos Sistos			12	14	17	16							8
28	(Italy) Laura Polidori					14	14							4
29	(Panama) Gianni Alessandria											14	15	3
30	(France) Hervé Clement			17	19									0
31	(Italy) Emanuele Mari			Ret	17									0
32	(France) Michel Mora			18	21									0
33	(France) Christian Ruiz			19	23									0
34	(France) Gilles Charpentier			20	22									0

=== Teams ===
Pos	Team	Points
1	(Italy) Team Torino Motorsport	590
2	(Italy) GSK Motorsport	464
3	(Italy) Viola Formula Racing	408
4	Team Costa Rica / Facondini Racing	195
5	(Italy) CO2 Motorsport	149
6	(Italy) Winner Motorsport	140
7	(Italy) MG Motorsport	114
8	(Italy) TS Corse	45
9	(Italy) AP Motorsport	29
10	(Italy) Facondini Racing	28
