= Tyler Dueck =

Canadian racing driver (b.1986)

Tyler Dueck (born December 17, 1986) is a Canadian racing driver from Abbotsford, British Columbia.

Dueck came up through karting and the Jim Russell Racing School. He finished fourth in Formula Russell in 2006 and made two Skip Barber National Championship starts in 2007. He then turned his career to Europe where he raced in the Italian Formula Renault Championship in 2008 and 2009, finishing 27th and fifth in points in his two seasons, capturing the 2009 season opener at Monza. In 2010, he made six starts in the Italian Formula Three Championship for BVM – Target Racing with a best finish of tenth in the second race at Hockenheimring, good enough for one point and 22nd in the championship. He also made his Le Mans Series debut in the 2010 8 Hours of Castellet for the Swiss Race Performance outfit. Dueck qualified the car eighteenth overall (tenth in class) but the entry was knocked out after 66 laps.

Dueck returned to North America and make his Firestone Indy Lights debut at Edmonton in his first race appearance of 2011 in July. The double-header in Edmonton would be Dueck's last professional race appearance.

== Motorsports career results ==
=== American open-wheel racing results ===
(key)

==== Indy Lights ====
Year	Team	1	2	3	4	5	6	7	8	9	10	11	12	13	14	Rank	Points	Ref
2011	Goree Multisports	STP	ALA	LBH	INDY	MIL	IOW	TOR	EDM; 16	EDM; 10	TRO	NHM	BAL	KTY	LVS	25th	34	
