= GP1 (TV channel) =

European motorsports TV channel

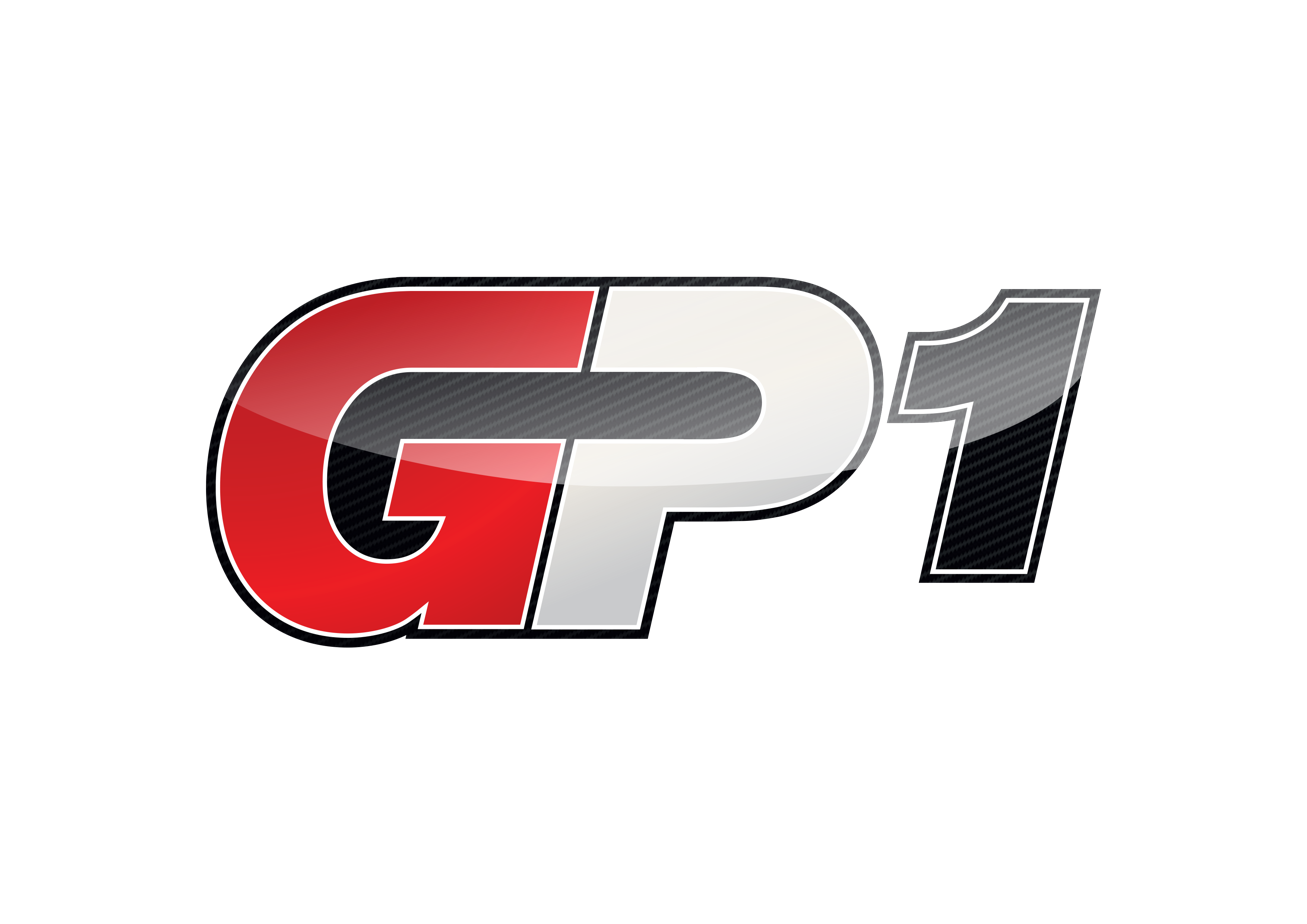
- Country: Croatia, Poland, Czech Republic, Slovakia, Slovenia, Bosnia and Herzegovina
- Headquarters: Jastrebarsko, Croatia

Programming
- Picture format: 1080i

Ownership
- Owner: Davorin Stetner

History
- Launched: 11 April 2011
- Former names: Kreator TV (2013-2022): Kreator F1 (2011–2013)

Links
- Website: gp1.tv

GP1 is a European sports media platform specialized in motorsports. GP1 includes a TV networks in local languages in Croatia, Poland, Czech Republic, Slovakia, Slovenia and several other countries, motorsport and F1 news portals, and a TV production units specializing in a live TV production of the complex motorsports races from major European racetracks. GP1 TV broadcasts its program to major IPTV & cable operators in Croatia, Poland, Czech Republic, Slovakia, Slovenia, and several other European countries. GP1's studios and headquarters are located in Jastrebarsko, Croatia.

== History ==
GP1 first started in 2011. under the name Kreator F1 and Kreator F1 HD for broadcasting only Formula 1 in biggest Croatian provider Max TV - part of Croatian Telecom as Kreator's owner acquired exclusive Formula 1 media rights for Croatia. The name Kreator TV was used from the second half of 2013 after Formula 1 co-operation until 2022 when media group changes its name to GP1.

GP1 has a history with premium sports rights and they owned and broadcast such rights as Formula 1, MotoGP, MX GP, FIA WTCC, FIA ERC and others. Among the others GP1 produced the season 2015 of the Second Croatian Football league. Journalists from the GP1 made some exclusive interviews with the top sportsman like Lewis Hamilton, Nico Rosberg (one of the last interviews before retirement), Valentino Rossi, Ken Block and others.

GP1 made significant steps in 2020. with own, multi-camera live broadcasts of the ESET Cup Series races from Hungaroring, Slovakia Ring, Automotodrom Brno and Automotodrom Grobnik and at the end of the year NASCAR Whelen Euro Series from Grobnik (Croatia) and finals on the Circuit Ricardo Tormo Valencia (Spain).

In the 2021. another milestone with GP1 entering into multi year agreement with NASCAR to produce and broadcast full seasons of future NASCAR Whelen Euro series. In the recent years GP1 crew produced and broadcast racing weekends from majority of the European tracks like Red Bull Ring, Brands Hatch, Ricardo Tormo Valencia, Hungaroring, Salzburgring, Automotodrom Brno, Zolder and many others.

At the end of the 2022. GP1 received highest recognition from the Croatian Olympic Committee for outstanding contribution to the Croatian sport which was awarded to the GP1's founder and the CEO Davorin Stetner at the gala evening at The Westin Zagreb. GP1 produced F1 Academy races at the Valencia Ricardo Tormo racetrack in 2023. for the F1. Beginning of 2024, GP1 produced and broadcast Dubai U13 Intercontinental football Cup in the United Arab Emirates and worked with Real Madrid, FC Barcelona, Chelsea FC...

== Honors ==
SPECIAL AWARD FOR PROMOTING SPORTS IN THE MEDIA / Croatian Olympic Committee / 21.12.2022.

Medium of the Year / Croatian Motorcycle Federation / 2020.

Special Award for promoting Autosport / Croatian Automobile & Karting Federation / 2019.

Special Award for the coverage of Autosport in 2016. / Croatian Automobile & Karting Federation / 2017.

Recognition for the development of motorcycle sports / Zagreb County Motorcycle Federation / 2016.

Special Award for "Tim Gajser" Documentary / High Five Sport Film & Media Festival / 2016.
