= Italian Formula Renault Championship =

Former Single-Seater Racing Championship

- Category: Formula Renault 2.0
- Country: Italy
- Inaugural season: 2000
- Folded: 2012
- Constructors: Tatuus
- Engine suppliers: Renault
- Last Drivers' champion: (Italy) Kevin Gilardoni
- Last Teams' champion: (Italy) GSK Grand Prix
- Official website: renaultsportitalia.it

Formula Renault 2.0 Italia was a Formula Renault 2.0 racing series that is based in Italy. The series raced mostly on Italian races but it had regular races at Belgium's Circuit de Spa-Francorchamps and in Spain.

Several Formula One drivers raced in this series, including Felipe Massa, Kamui Kobayashi, Robert Kubica and Pastor Maldonado.

== Regulations ==
Each championship round included 2 races lasting about 30 minutes. Points were awarded as follows:

| Position | 1st | 2nd | 3rd | 4th | 5th | 6th | 7th | 8th | 9th | 10th |
| Points | 25 | 18 | 15 | 12 | 10 | 8 | 6 | 4 | 2 | 1 |

In each race, 1 bonus point was awarded for pole position and 1 point for fastest lap. Only classified drivers were awarded points.

== Champions ==
| Season | Series Name | Champion | Team Champion | Winter Cup Champion |
|---|---|---|---|---|
| 2000 | Formula Renault 2000 Italia | (Brazil) Felipe Massa | (Italy) Cram Competition | (Italy) Ronnie Quintarelli |
| 2001 | Formula Renault 2000 Italia | (Australia) Ryan Briscoe | (Italy) Prema Powerteam | (Brazil) Roberto Streit |
| 2002 | Formula Renault 2000 Italia | (Argentina) José María López | (Italy) Cram Competition | (Finland) Toni Vilander |
| 2003 | Formula Renault 2000 Italia | (France) Franck Perera | (Italy) Prema Powerteam | (Venezuela) Pastor Maldonado |
| 2004 | Formula Renault 2000 Italia | (Venezuela) Pastor Maldonado | (Italy) Cram Competition | (Russia) Mikhail Aleshin |
| 2005 | Formula Renault 2.0 Italia | (Japan) Kamui Kobayashi | (Switzerland) Jenzer Motorsport | (Finland) Atte Mustonen |
| 2006 | Formula Renault 2.0 Italia | (Spain) Dani Clos | (Italy) Cram Competition | (Spain) Jaime Alguersuari |
| 2007 | Formula Renault 2.0 Italia | (Finland) Mika Mäki | (Spain) Epsilon Red Bull Team | (Brazil) César Ramos |
| 2008 | Formula Renault 2.0 Italia | (Norway) Pål Varhaug | (Switzerland) Jenzer Motorsport | (Italy) Daniel Mancinelli |
| 2009 | Formula Renault 2.0 Italia | (Italy) Daniel Mancinelli | (Italy) CO2 Motorsport | |
| 2010 | Formula Renault 2.0 Italia | (Italy) Francesco Frisone | (Italy) Viola Formula Racing | |
| 2011 | Challenge Formula Renault 2.0 | (Italy) Andrea Boffo | (Italy) Team Torino Motorsport | |
| 2012 | Formula Renault 2.0 Italia | (Italy) Kevin Gilardoni | (Italy) GSK Grand Prix | |
