= 2020 Le Mans Cup =

The 2020 Le Mans Cup, known as the 2020 Michelin Le Mans Cup under sponsorship, was the fifth season of the Le Mans Cup. It began on 18 July at the Circuit Paul Ricard and finished on 1 November at Algarve International Circuit. The series was open to Le Mans Prototypes in the LMP3 class, and grand tourer sports cars in the GT3 class. The 2020 calendar was released on 4 April 2020.

This season ran with a newly updated 2020 ACO LMP3 specification, including an uplift of ~35bhp in power and to 5.6 litres from 5.0 litres. An issue with fuel consumption came to light after Free Practice sessions; the spec Nissan VK56 / X-Trac drivetrain, homologated and supplied through Oreca, used more fuel than was predicted. To mitigate this in the first race an additional mandatory pit stop was added, along with adjustments to relevant mandatory stop times and driver stint rules.

== Calendar ==
The 2020 calendar was released on 4 April 2020. All races supported the 2020 European Le Mans Series except the Le Mans round, which was part of the 2020 24 Hours of Le Mans weekend.

The Barcelona round was moved to Paul Ricard due to the COVID-19 situation in Barcelona.

Round	Circuit	Location	Race length	Date
1	(France) Circuit Paul Ricard	Le Castellet, France	2 hours	18 July
2	(Belgium) Circuit de Spa-Francorchamps	Spa, Belgium	2 hours	8 August
3	(France) Circuit Paul Ricard	Le Castellet, France	2 hours	29 August
4	(France) Circuit de la Sarthe	Le Mans, France	55 minutes	19 September
4	(France) Circuit de la Sarthe	Le Mans, France	55 minutes	18 September
5	(Italy) Autodromo Nazionale Monza	Monza, Italy	2 hours	10 October
6	(Portugal) Algarve International Circuit	Portimão, Portugal	2 hours	1 November

== Entries ==
=== LMP3 ===
Team	Car	No.	Drivers	Rounds
(Luxembourg) DKR Engineering	Duqueine M30 - D08	1	(Belgium) Ugo de Wilde	4
(Luxembourg) DKR Engineering	Duqueine M30 - D08	1	(Germany) Wolfgang Triller	4
(Luxembourg) DKR Engineering	Duqueine M30 - D08	3	(Belgium) Jean Glorieux	1–5
(Luxembourg) DKR Engineering	Duqueine M30 - D08	3	(Germany) Laurents Hörr	All
(Luxembourg) DKR Engineering	Duqueine M30 - D08	3	(Germany) Wolfgang Triller	6
(Switzerland) Realteam Racing	Ligier JS P320	4	(Switzerland) Esteban García	4
(Switzerland) Realteam Racing	Ligier JS P320	4	(Switzerland) David Droux	4
(Spain) CD Sport	Ligier JS P320	5	(United Kingdom) Nicholas Adcock	All
(Spain) CD Sport	Ligier JS P320	5	(Denmark) Michael Jensen	All
(Spain) CD Sport	Ligier JS P320	6	(France) Jacques Wolff	All
(Spain) CD Sport	Ligier JS P320	6	(France) Joffrey de Narda	1–3, 5–6
(Spain) CD Sport	Ligier JS P320	6	(France) Kévin Bole Besançon	4
(United Kingdom) Nielsen Racing	Duqueine M30 - D08	7	(United Kingdom) Colin Noble	All
(United Kingdom) Nielsen Racing	Duqueine M30 - D08	7	(United Kingdom) Anthony Wells	All
(United Kingdom) Nielsen Racing	Duqueine M30 - D08	10	(Canada) Garett Grist	All
(United Kingdom) Nielsen Racing	Duqueine M30 - D08	10	(United States) Rob Hodes	All
(Luxembourg) Racing Experience	Duqueine M30 - D08	11	(Luxembourg) Gary Hauser	1, 4
(Luxembourg) Racing Experience	Duqueine M30 - D08	11	(Netherlands) Yury Wagner	1, 3
(Luxembourg) Racing Experience	Duqueine M30 - D08	11	(France) Nicolas Melin	2, 4–5
(Luxembourg) Racing Experience	Duqueine M30 - D08	11	(Luxembourg) David Hauser	2–3, 5
(Poland) Team Virage	Ligier JS P320	12	(France) Julien Falchero	3
(Poland) Team Virage	Ligier JS P320	12	(France) Philippe Haezebrouck	3
(Poland) Team Virage	Ligier JS P320	12	(United Kingdom) James Winslow	4
(Poland) Team Virage	Ligier JS P320	12	(Belgium) Tom Cloet	4
(Poland) Team Virage	Ligier JS P320	12	(France) Alessandro Ghiretti	6
(Poland) Team Virage	Ligier JS P320	12	(Portugal) Miguel Cristóvão	6
(United States) Eurointernational	Ligier JS P320	14	(Finland) Niko Kari	4
(United States) Eurointernational	Ligier JS P320	14	(France) François Hériau	4
(United Kingdom) RLR MSport	Ligier JS P320	15	(Canada) James Dayson	4
(United Kingdom) RLR MSport	Ligier JS P320	15	(Denmark) Malthe Jakobsen	4
(United Kingdom) Grainmarket Racing	Duqueine M30 - D08	20	(United Kingdom) Mark Crader	1–2, 5
(United Kingdom) Grainmarket Racing	Duqueine M30 - D08	20	(United Kingdom) Alex Mortimer	1–2, 5
(Belgium) Mühlner Motorsport	Duqueine M30 - D08	21	(Germany) Moritz Kranz	All
(Belgium) Mühlner Motorsport	Duqueine M30 - D08	21	(Belgium) Tom Cloet	1–2
(Belgium) Mühlner Motorsport	Duqueine M30 - D08	21	(Belgium) Gilles Magnus	3–4
(Belgium) Mühlner Motorsport	Duqueine M30 - D08	21	(United Kingdom) Alex Kapadia	5–6
(United Kingdom) United Autosports	Ligier JS P320	22	(United States) Jim McGuire	4
(United Kingdom) United Autosports	Ligier JS P320	22	(United Kingdom) Duncan Tappy	4
(United Kingdom) United Autosports	Ligier JS P320	23	(United Kingdom) Wayne Boyd	All
(United Kingdom) United Autosports	Ligier JS P320	23	(United States) John Schauerman	All
(United Kingdom) United Autosports	Ligier JS P320	24	(United Kingdom) Andy Meyrick	All
(United Kingdom) United Autosports	Ligier JS P320	24	(Brazil) Daniel Schneider	All
(United Kingdom) United Autosports	Ligier JS P320	25	(United Kingdom) Shaun Lynn	4
(United Kingdom) United Autosports	Ligier JS P320	25	(United Kingdom) Joe Macari	4
(France) Graff	Ligier JS P320	26	(Liechtenstein) Matthias Kaiser	All
(France) Graff	Ligier JS P320	26	(Finland) Rory Penttinen	All
(France) MV2S Racing	Ligier JS P320	27	(France) Christophe Cresp	All
(France) MV2S Racing	Ligier JS P320	27	(France) Bruce Jouanny	1, 4
(France) MV2S Racing	Ligier JS P320	27	(France) Fabien Lavergne	2–3, 5–6
(Switzerland) Cool Racing	Ligier JS P320	37	(France) Edouard Cauhaupe	All
(Switzerland) Cool Racing	Ligier JS P320	37	(France) Nicolas Maulini	All
(Switzerland) Cool Racing	Ligier JS P320	69	(United States) Maurice Smith	All
(Switzerland) Cool Racing	Ligier JS P320	69	(United Kingdom) Ben Barnicoat	1
(Switzerland) Cool Racing	Ligier JS P320	69	(United Kingdom) Matt Bell	2–6
(Germany) Rinaldi Racing	Duqueine M30 - D08	55	(Germany) Alexander Mattschull	1, 3–4, 6
(Germany) Rinaldi Racing	Duqueine M30 - D08	55	(Germany) Daniel Keilwitz	1, 3
(Germany) Rinaldi Racing	Duqueine M30 - D08	55	(France) Nicolas Schatz	4
(Germany) Rinaldi Racing	Duqueine M30 - D08	55	(Argentina) Nicolás Varrone	6
(Germany) Rinaldi Racing	Duqueine M30 - D08	66	(Germany) Steve Parrow	1–4, 6
(Germany) Rinaldi Racing	Duqueine M30 - D08	66	(Germany) Dominik Schwager	1–4, 6
(France) IDEC Sport	Ligier JS P320	75	(France) Patrice Lafargue	3–6
(France) IDEC Sport	Ligier JS P320	75	(France) Stéphane Adler	3–4
(France) IDEC Sport	Ligier JS P320	75	(France) Dimitri Enjalbert	5–6
(Belgium) Motorsport98	Ligier JS P320	98	(Belgium) Eric De Doncker	1–3, 5–6
(Belgium) Motorsport98	Ligier JS P320	98	(France) Dino Lunardi	1–3, 5–6
Entries:

=== GT3 ===
Team	Car	No.	Drivers	Rounds
(Switzerland) Pzoberer Zürichsee by TFT	Porsche 911 GT3 R	2	(France) Julien Andlauer	1, 3–6
(Switzerland) Pzoberer Zürichsee by TFT	Porsche 911 GT3 R	2	(Switzerland) Nicolas Leutwiler	1, 3–6
(Italy) Iron Lynx	Ferrari 488 GT3	8	(Italy) Rino Mastronardi	All
(Italy) Iron Lynx	Ferrari 488 GT3	8	(Italy) Giacomo Piccini	1–2, 4–6
(Italy) Iron Lynx	Ferrari 488 GT3	8	(Denmark) Nicklas Nielsen	3
(Italy) Iron Lynx	Ferrari 488 GT3	9	(Denmark) Michelle Gatting	1–2
(Italy) Iron Lynx	Ferrari 488 GT3	9	(France) Deborah Mayer	1–2
(Italy) Iron Lynx	Ferrari 488 GT3	9	(Italy) Paolo Ruberti	4
(Italy) Iron Lynx	Ferrari 488 GT3	9	(Russia) Murad Sultanov	4
(Italy) Iron Lynx	Ferrari 488 GT3	9	(Italy) Niccolò Schirò	5
(Italy) Iron Lynx	Ferrari 488 GT3	9	(Italy) Emanuele Maria Tabacchi	5
(Italy) Iron Lynx	Ferrari 488 GT3	77	(Italy) Claudio Schiavoni	1–5
(Italy) Iron Lynx	Ferrari 488 GT3	77	(Italy) Andrea Piccini	1–2, 4–5
(Italy) Iron Lynx	Ferrari 488 GT3	77	(Republic of Ireland) Matt Griffin	3
(France) IDEC Sport	Mercedes-AMG GT3	17	(France) Patrice Lafargue	1
(France) IDEC Sport	Mercedes-AMG GT3	17	(France) Erik Maris	1
(Belgium) Delahaye Racing Team	Porsche 911 GT3 R	28	(France) Pierre-Etienne Bordet	4
(Belgium) Delahaye Racing Team	Porsche 911 GT3 R	28	(France) Alexandre Viron	4
(Switzerland) Kessel Racing	Ferrari 488 GT3	50	(United Kingdom) Oliver Hancock	All
(Switzerland) Kessel Racing	Ferrari 488 GT3	50	(United Kingdom) John Hartshorne	All
(Switzerland) Kessel Racing	Ferrari 488 GT3	67	(Russia) Murad Sultanov	1–3
(Switzerland) Kessel Racing	Ferrari 488 GT3	67	(Italy) Paolo Ruberti	1–2
(Switzerland) Kessel Racing	Ferrari 488 GT3	67	(Italy) Andrea Belicchi	3
(Switzerland) Kessel Racing	Ferrari 488 GT3	67	(Turkey) Murat Cuhadaroglu	4–5
(Switzerland) Kessel Racing	Ferrari 488 GT3	67	(Italy) Nicola Cadei	4
(Switzerland) Kessel Racing	Ferrari 488 GT3	67	(Italy) David Fumanelli	5
(Switzerland) Kessel Racing	Ferrari 488 GT3	74	(Poland) Michał Broniszewski	All
(Switzerland) Kessel Racing	Ferrari 488 GT3	74	(South Africa) David Perel	All
(Switzerland) Spirit of Race	Ferrari 488 GT3	51	(United States) Gunnar Jeannette	4
(Switzerland) Spirit of Race	Ferrari 488 GT3	51	(United States) Rodrigo Sales	4
(China) Orange1 FFF Racing Team	Lamborghini Huracán GT3	63	(Italy) Andrea Caldarelli	4
(China) Orange1 FFF Racing Team	Lamborghini Huracán GT3	63	(Japan) Hiroshi Hamaguchi	4
(United Kingdom) Optimum Motorsport	McLaren 720S GT3	70	(United States) Brendan Iribe	5
(United Kingdom) Optimum Motorsport	McLaren 720S GT3	70	(United Kingdom) Ollie Millroy	5
(United Kingdom) Sky - Tempesta Racing	Ferrari 488 GT3	93	(United Kingdom) Chris Froggatt	4
(United Kingdom) Sky - Tempesta Racing	Ferrari 488 GT3	93	(Hong Kong) Jonathan Hui	4
Entries

== Race results ==
Bold indicates the overall winner.

Rnd		Circuit	LMP3 Winning Team	GT3 Winning Team
Rnd		Circuit	LMP3 Winning Drivers	GT3 Winning Drivers
1		(France) Paul Ricard	**(Luxembourg) No. 3 DKR Engineering**	(Italy) No. 8 Iron Lynx
1		(France) Paul Ricard	**(Belgium) Jean Glorieux** **(Germany) Laurents Hörr**	(Italy) Rino Mastronardi (Italy) Giacomo Piccini
2		(Belgium) Spa-Francorchamps	**(Switzerland) No. 37 Cool Racing**	(Italy) No. 8 Iron Lynx
2		(Belgium) Spa-Francorchamps	**(France) Edouard Cauhaupe** **(France) Nicolas Maulini**	(Italy) Rino Mastronardi (Italy) Giacomo Piccini
3		(France) Paul Ricard	**(Switzerland) No. 69 Cool Racing**	(Switzerland) No. 2 Pzoberer Zürichsee by TFT
3		(France) Paul Ricard	**(United States) Maurice Smith** **(United Kingdom) Matt Bell**	(France) Julien Andlauer (Switzerland) Nicolas Leutwiler
4	R1	(France) Le Mans (report)	**(Luxembourg) No. 3 DKR Engineering**	(Italy) No. 8 Iron Lynx (Note: The GT3 class winner in Race 1 at Le Mans was the No. 63 FFF Racing Team by ACM invitational entry. As it is not a full-season Michelin Le Mans Cup entrant, the points for the win were awarded to the No. 8 Iron Lynx entry)
4	R1	(France) Le Mans (report)	**(Belgium) Jean Glorieux** **(Germany) Laurents Hörr**	(Italy) Rino Mastronardi (Italy) Giacomo Piccini
4	R2	(France) Le Mans (report)	**(Switzerland) No. 37 Cool Racing**	(Switzerland) No. 74 Kessel Racing (Note: The GT3 class winner in Race 2 at Le Mans was the No. 63 FFF Racing Team by ACM invitational entry. As it is not a full-season Michelin Le Mans Cup entrant, the points for the win were awarded to the No. 74 Kessel Racing entry)
4	R2	(France) Le Mans (report)	**(France) Edouard Cauhaupe** **(France) Nicolas Maulini**	(Poland) Michał Broniszewski (South Africa) David Perel
5		(Italy) Monza	**(Luxembourg) No. 3 DKR Engineering**	(Switzerland) No. 2 Pzoberer Zürichsee by TFT
5		(Italy) Monza	**(Belgium) Jean Glorieux** **(Germany) Laurents Hörr**	(France) Julien Andlauer (Switzerland) Nicolas Leutwiler
6		(Portugal) Portimão	**(United Kingdom) No. 7 Nielsen Racing**	(Italy) No. 8 Iron Lynx
6		(Portugal) Portimão	**(United Kingdom) Colin Noble** **(United Kingdom) Anthony Wells**	(Italy) Rino Mastronardi (Italy) Giacomo Piccini

== Standings ==
Points are awarded according to the following structure:

Position	1st	2nd	3rd	4th	5th	6th	7th	8th	9th	10th	Other	Pole
Points	25	18	15	12	10	8	6	4	2	1	0.5	1
Le Mans	15	9	7	6	5	4	3	2	1	0.5	0.5	1

=== LMP3 Teams Championship ===
Pos.	Team	Car	RIC (France)	SPA (Belgium)	LEC (France)	LMS (France)		MNZ (Italy)	POR (Portugal)	Points
1	(Luxembourg) #3 DKR Engineering	Duqueine M30 - D08	**1**	2	4	1	2	1	3	120
2	(Switzerland) #37 Cool Racing	Ligier JS P320	Ret	**1**	5	2	**1**	**2**	**6**	89
3	(France) #26 Graff	Ligier JS P320	3	5	**2**	13	5	3	7	70.5
4	(Switzerland) #69 Cool Racing	Ligier JS P320	5	7	1	3	3	8	Ret	59
5	(United Kingdom) #7 Nielsen Racing	Duqueine M30 - D08	14	3	6	11	4	Ret	1	55
6	(Belgium) #98 Motorsport98	Ligier JS P320	2	6	Ret			5	8	40
7	(Belgium) #21 Mühlner Motorsport	Duqueine M30 - D08	4	11	11	7	12	Ret	2	34.5
8	(United Kingdom) #23 United Autosports	Ligier JS P320	12	4	9	**5**	Ret	9	4	34.5
9	(United Kingdom) #24 United Autosports	Ligier JS P320	6	Ret	3	4	10	Ret	Ret	29.5
10	(United Kingdom) #10 Nielsen Racing	Duqueine M30 - D08	9	9	7	9	9	4	Ret	24
11	(Spain) #6 CD Sport	Ligier JS P320	13	13	8	Ret	8	7	9	15
12	(France) #27 MV2S Racing	Ligier JS P320	7	10	12	8	6	11	Ret	14
13	(Germany) #55 Rinaldi Racing	Duqueine M30 - D08	10		10	12	13		5	13
14	(United Kingdom) #20 Grainmarket Racing	Duqueine M30 - D08	8	Ret				6		12
15	(Luxembourg) #11 Racing Experience	Duqueine M30 - D08	Ret	8	Ret	6	7	10	WD	12
16	(Germany) #66 Rinaldi Racing	Duqueine M30 - D08	Ret	12	14	10	11		10	3
17	(Spain) #5 CD Sport	Ligier JS P320	11	14	13	Ret	Ret	Ret	Ret	1.5
Pos.	Team	Car	RIC (France)	SPA (Belgium)	LEC (France)	LMS (France)		MNZ (Italy)	POR (Portugal)	Points

Key
Colour	Result
Gold	Race winner
Silver	2nd place
Bronze	3rd place
Green	Points finish
Blue	Non-points finish
Blue	Non-classified finish (NC)
Purple	Did not finish (Ret)
Black	Disqualified (DSQ)
Black	Excluded (EX)
White	Did not start (DNS)
White	Race cancelled (C)
White	Withdrew (WD)
Blank	Did not participate

**Bold** – Pole
Italics – Fastest Lap

=== GT3 Teams Championship ===
Pos.	Team	Car	RIC (France)	SPA (Belgium)	LEC (France)	LMS (France)		MNZ (Italy)	POR (Portugal)	Points
1	(Italy) #8 Iron Lynx	Ferrari 488 GT3	**1**	**1**	3	1	**3**	**3**	**1**	132
2	(Switzerland) #74 Kessel Racing	Ferrari 488 GT3	Ret	2	**2**	**2**	1	4	2	92
3	(Switzerland) #2 Pzoberer Zürichsee by TFT	Porsche 911 GT3 R	Ret		1	5	Ret	1	3	70
4	(Switzerland) #67 Kessel Racing	Ferrari 488 GT3	2	3	4	6	2	7		64
5	(Switzerland) #50 Kessel Racing	Ferrari 488 GT3	4	4	6	4	6	6	4	62
6	(Italy) #77 Iron Lynx	Ferrari 488 GT3	3	DNS	5	3	4	5	WD	48
7	(Italy) #9 Iron Lynx	Ferrari 488 GT3	5	Ret		Ret	5	2	WD	33
8	(Switzerland) #51 Spirit of Race	Ferrari 488 GT3				DNS	7			3
Pos.	Team	Car	RIC (France)	SPA (Belgium)	LEC (France)	LMS (France)		MNZ (Italy)	POR (Portugal)	Points

Key
Colour	Result
Gold	Race winner
Silver	2nd place
Bronze	3rd place
Green	Points finish
Blue	Non-points finish
Blue	Non-classified finish (NC)
Purple	Did not finish (Ret)
Black	Disqualified (DSQ)
Black	Excluded (EX)
White	Did not start (DNS)
White	Race cancelled (C)
White	Withdrew (WD)
Blank	Did not participate

**Bold** – Pole
Italics – Fastest Lap
