= DC Racing Solutions =

Motorsport holding company

DC Racing Solutions Ltd.
- Company type: Private
- Industry: Motorsport
- Founded: 12 July 2017; 8 years ago
- Headquarters: Baarerstrasse 80, Zug, Switzerland
- Area served: Worldwide
- Key people: Deborah Mayer (Chairwoman); Claudio Schiavoni (Board); Andrea Piccini (Board)
- Subsidiaries: Iron Lynx Motorsport Lab; Iron Dames; Prema Racing
- Website: www.dcrs.ch

DC Racing Solutions Ltd. is a Swiss holding company that oversees the operations of Iron Lynx Motorsport Lab, Iron Dames, and Prema Racing in motorsport competition.

== History ==
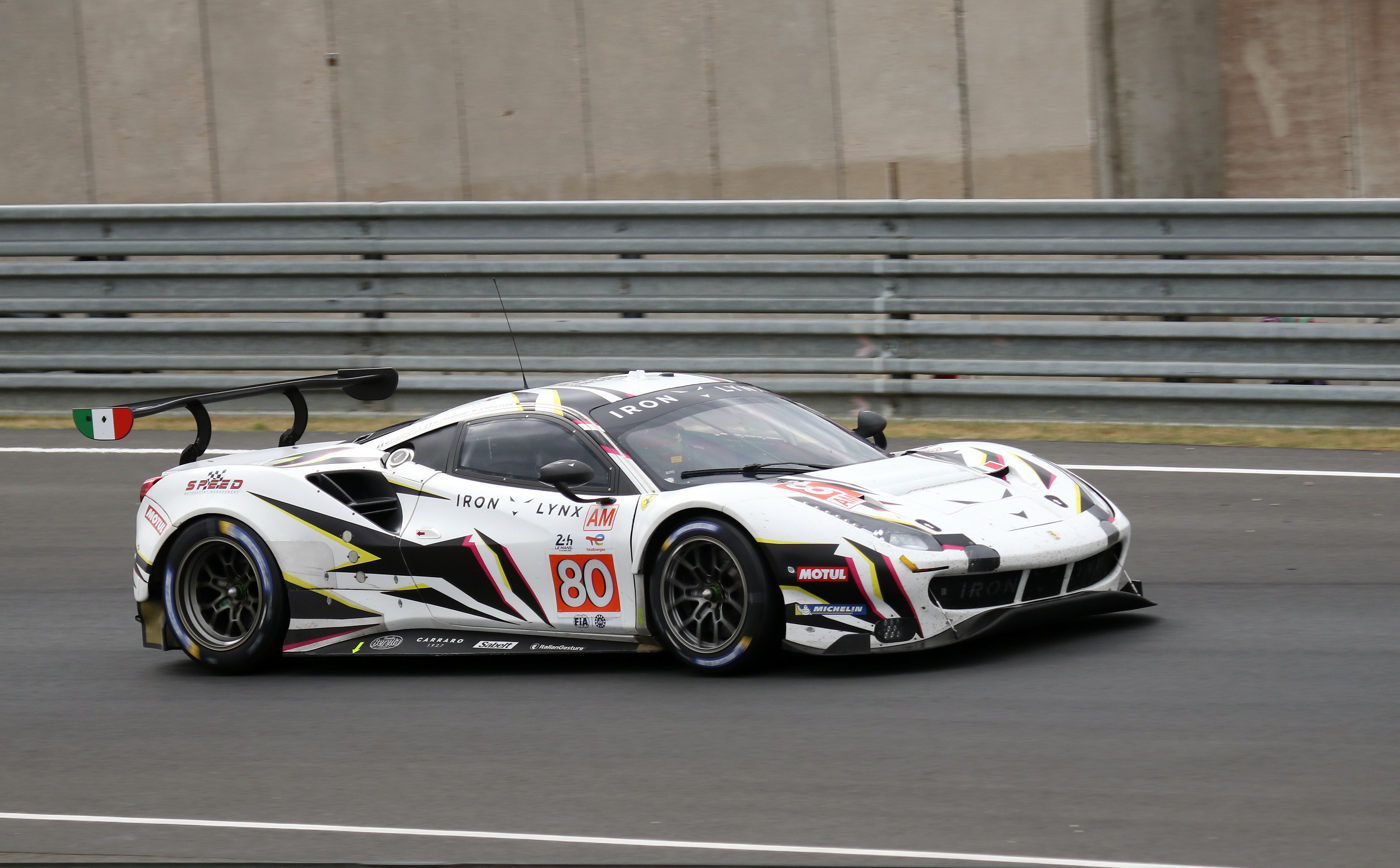
A Ferrari 488 GTE run by the Iron Lynx subsidiary in 2022.

The company was founded by amateur racing drivers Deborah Mayer and Claudio Schiavoni in 2017, along with Swiss lawyer Fabio Gaggini, as a stepping stone to creating the Iron Lynx Motorsport Lab team alongside driver coaches Sergio Pianezzola, Andrea Piccini and Giacomo Piccini. As part of the Iron Lynx project, Mayer launched an ancillary program called Iron Dames to assist the development of female drivers.

In July 2021, the company announced a tie-up with junior formulae team Prema Racing, buying the Italian outfit from Lawrence Stroll. Iron Lynx and Prema have since collaborated on motorsport projects, including the development of the Lamborghini SC63.

The company owns the trademark to the Iron Dames slogans "Women Driven by Dreams" and "Every Dream Matters".
