= Rino Mastronardi =

Italian racing driver

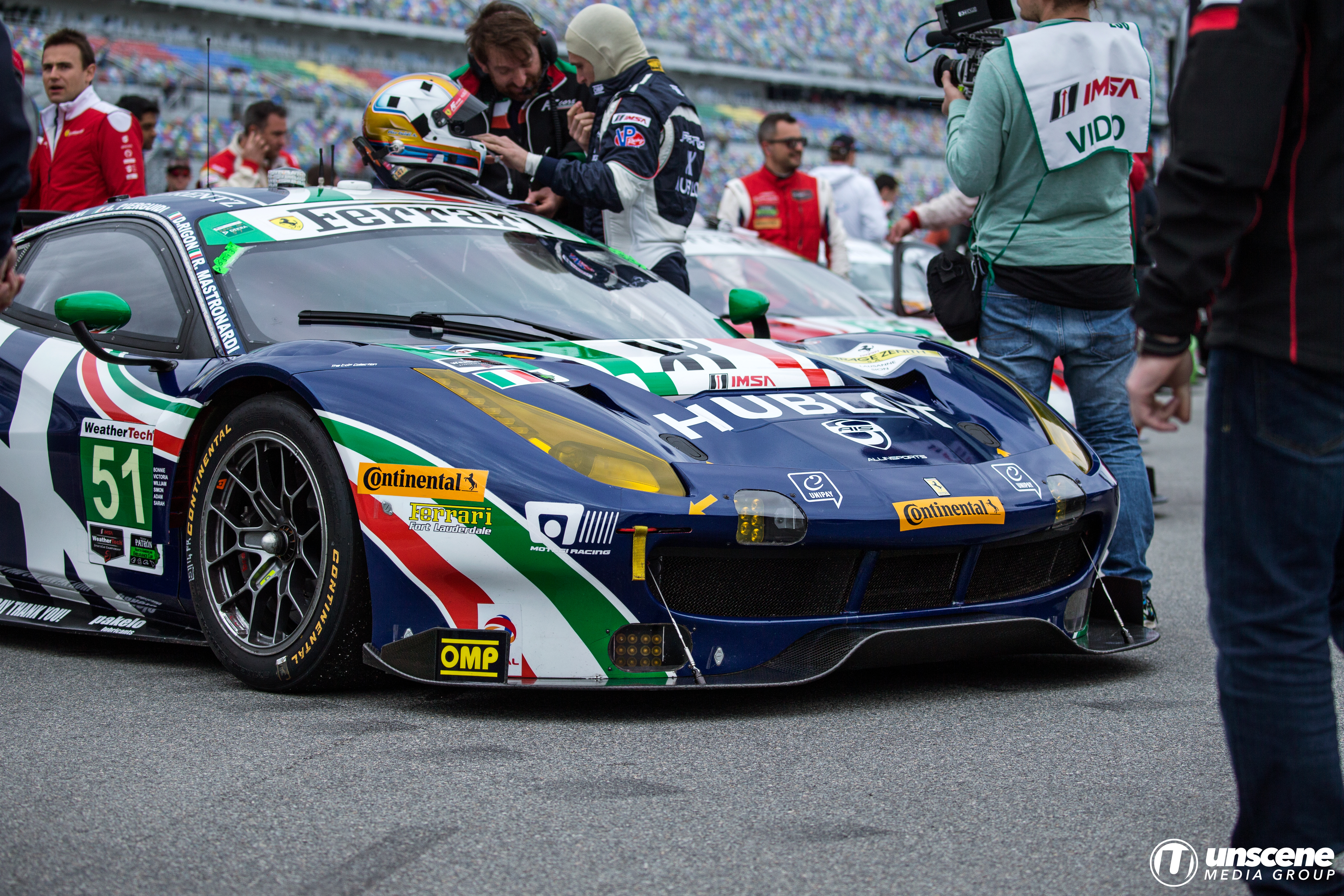
- Nationality: (Italy) Italian
- Born: November 14, 1969 (age 56)

Asian Le Mans Series career
- Debut season: 2017
- Current team: Rinaldi Racing
- Categorisation: FIA Bronze (until 2017, 2020–2021); FIA Silver (2018–2019, 2022–)
- Car number: 55
- Starts: 12
- Wins: 2
- Podiums: 6
- Best finish: 2nd in 2017

Previous series
- 1996-98 1997 1998-2000 2015,17,20-21 2015 2016-17,20-21 2017,20-21 2017,20-21 2017 2017 2020-21 2021: Barber Dodge Pro Series; U.S. F2000 National Championship; Atlantic Championship; European Le Mans Series; Blancpain Endurance Series; Blancpain GT Series; Intercontinental GT Challenge; European Le Mans Series; Blancpain GT Series Asia; IMSA SportsCar Championship; Michelin Le Mans Cup; FIA World Endurance Championship

Championship titles
- 2020 2021: Michelin Le Mans Cup-GT3; European Le Mans Series-LMGTE
- Statistics up to date as of March 24, 2022.

Rino Mastronardi (born 14 November 1969) is an Italian racing driver currently competing in the Asian Le Mans Series for Rinaldi Racing. Mastronardi has previously competed in several international touring car championships, most notably winning the GT3 class of the Michelin Le Mans Cup in 2020 and the LMGTE class of the European Le Mans Series in 2021, both with Iron Lynx.

== Racing Record ==
=== Complete 24 Hours of Le Mans results ===
Year	Team	Co-Drivers	Car	Class	Laps	Pos.	Class Pos.
2020	(Italy) Iron Lynx	(Italy) Matteo Cressoni (Italy) Andrea Piccini	Ferrari 488 GTE Evo	LMGTE Am	331	37th	9th
2021	(Italy) Iron Lynx	(Italy) Matteo Cressoni (United Kingdom) Callum Ilott	Ferrari 488 GTE Evo	GTE Am	338	27th	3rd
