= Le Mans Cup =

International sports car racing endurance series

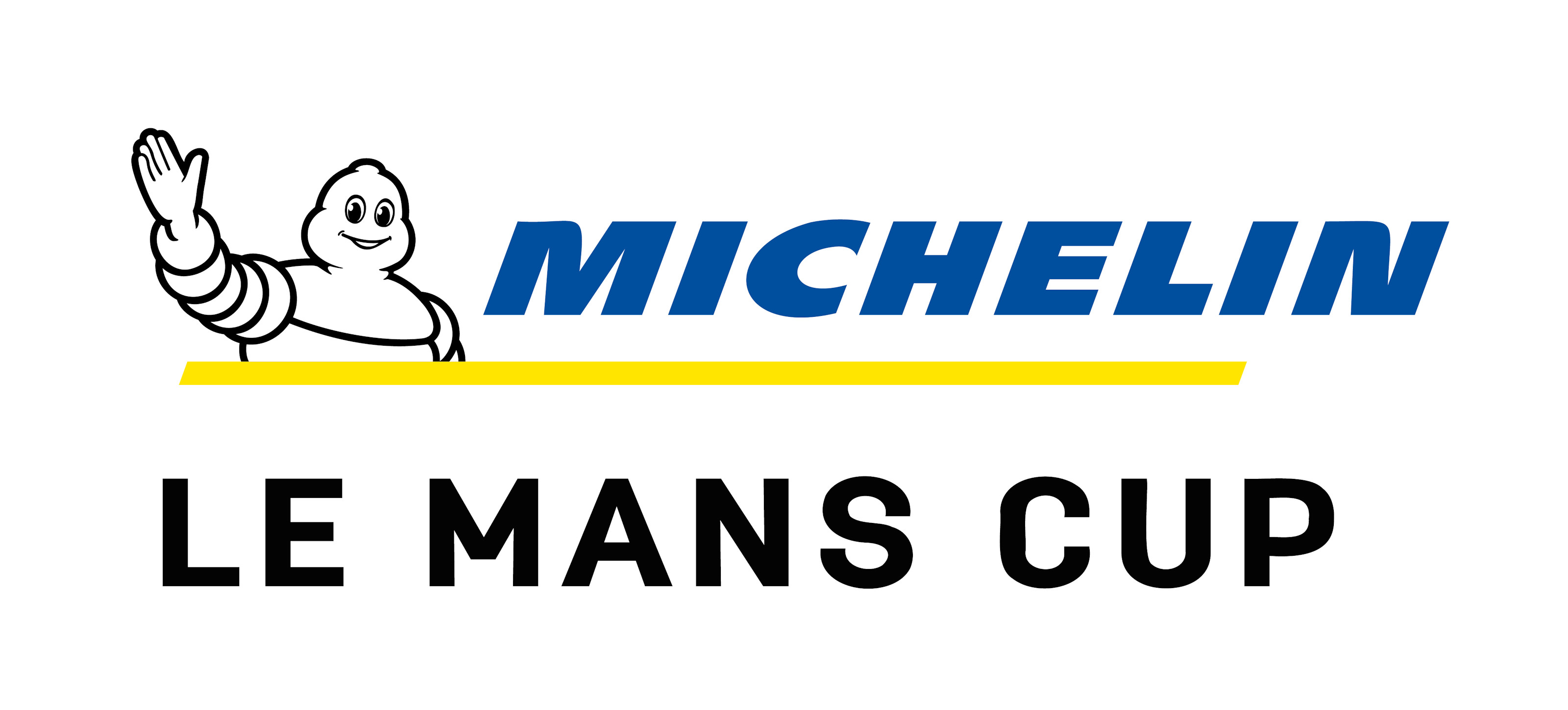
- Category: Endurance racing
- Region: Europe
- Inaugural season: 2016
- Prototype classes: LMP3, LMP3 Pro-Am
- GT classes: GT3
- Teams: 44
- Constructors: GT3: Ferrari • Aston Martin • Porsche • Mercedes-Benz
- Chassis manufacturers: LMP3: Ginetta • Ligier • Duqueine • ADESS
- Engine manufacturers: LMP3: Toyota
- Tyre suppliers: Michelin
- Drivers' champion: LMP3: (France) Hadrien David (Germany) Hugo Schwarze; LMP3 Pro-Am: (Belgium) Eric De Doncker (France) Gillian Henrion; GT3: (Italy) Alessandro Cozzi (Italy) Eliseo Donno
- Teams' champion: LMP3: (France) R-ace GP; LMP3 Pro-Am: (Belgium) Motorsport98; GT3: (Italy) AF Corse
- Official website: lemanscup.com

The Le Mans Cup, previously the GT3 Le Mans Cup and currently known as the Michelin Le Mans Cup under sponsorship, is an international sports car racing endurance series inspired by the 24 Hours of Le Mans race and organized by the Automobile Club de l'Ouest (ACO).

== History ==
The GT3 Le Mans Cup was created in 2016 after the GTC category was dropped from the European Le Mans Series. The new series was designed primarily to increase the number of amateur drivers. The teams' champion automatically receives an invitation to take part in the following 24 Hours of Le Mans in the LMGT3 category.

From the 2017 season, the series adopted a new format with LMP3 and GT3-class cars competing in their respective categories, with the ACO aiming to create a secondary division of LMP3-racing and promoting the best teams from the Le Mans Cup to the European Le Mans Series.

A new LMP3 specification with higher power engines was introduced for the 2020 season; this was found to consume more fuel than predicted, forcing pit stop and stint time rule changes.

The Le Mans weekend originally had a one-hour format in 2017, and has had two 55-minute races every year since 2018. The remaining races originally had a two-hour format, later shortened to 1h 50min for the 2022 season, to enable removal of this second mandatory pit stop.

Starting in the 2025 Le Mans Cup Season, the LMP3 Class will be split into two with the introduction of LMP3 Pro-Am as well as new ACO Generation III LMP3 Built cars will be eligible for the category such as the Ginetta G61-LT-P3 Evo, Ligier JS P325, Duqueine D09, and the ADESS AD25 all of which use a V35A-FTS 3.5L Toyota V6 twin turbo engine and Michelin tyres.

== Logo History ==
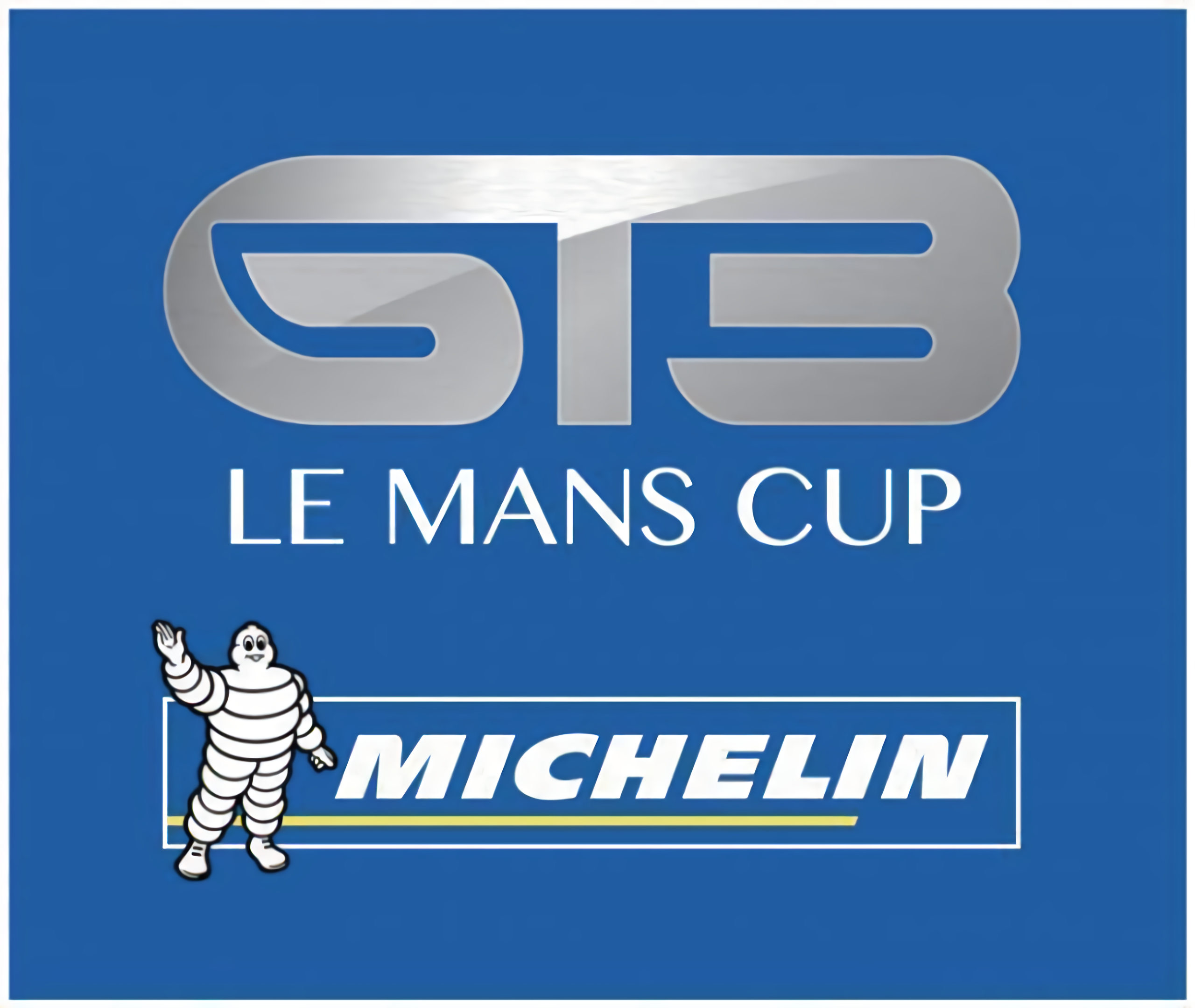
Michelin GT3 Le Mans Cup logo used in the 2016 season

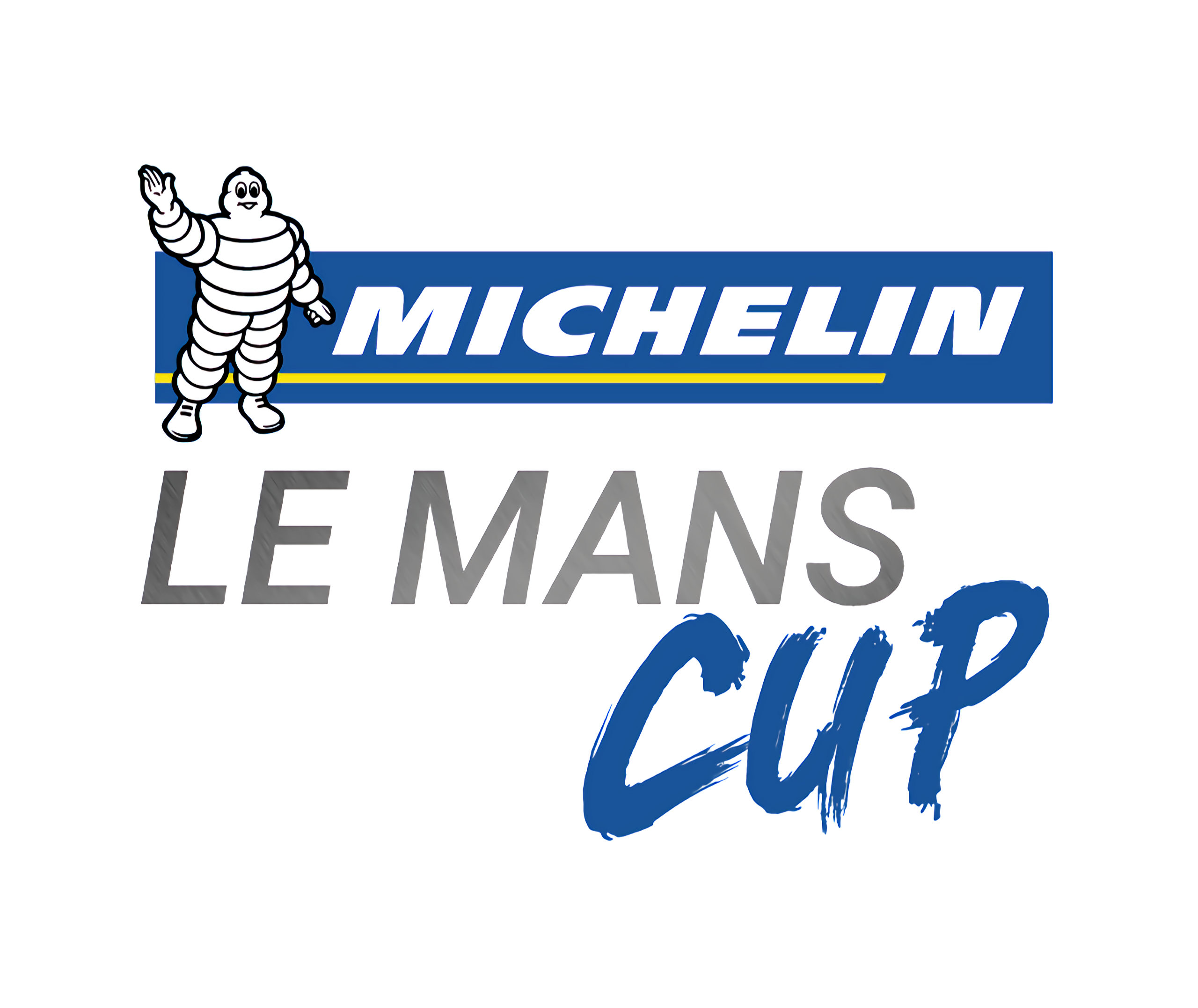
Michelin Le Mans Cup logo used in the 2017 season

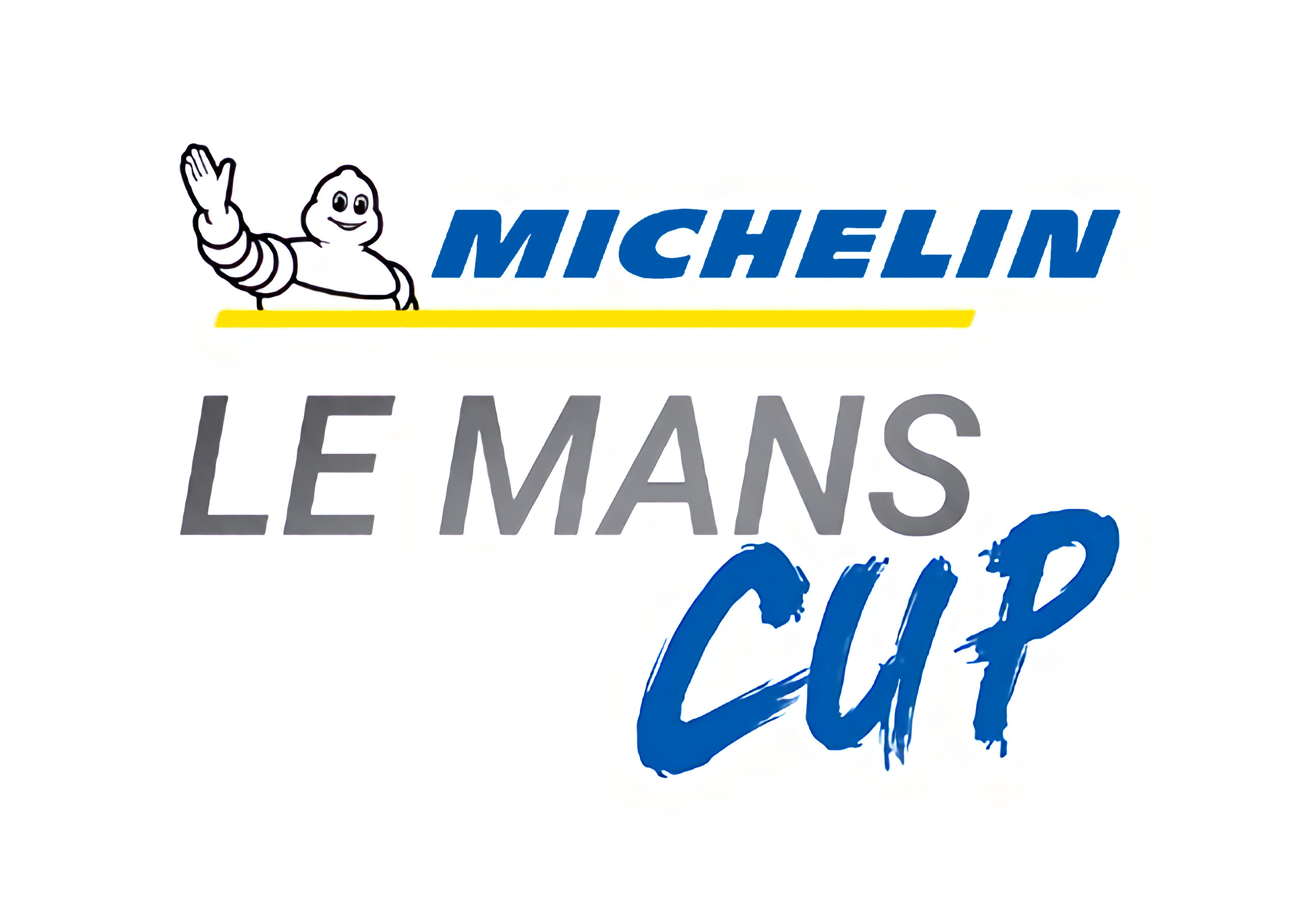
Michelin Le Mans Cup logo used from 2018 until the end of the 2023 season

== Drivers Championships ==
=== LMP3 Drivers ===
Season	Drivers	Team	Poles	Wins	Podiums	Points	Clinched	Margin	Ref
2017	(Belgium) Jean Glorieux (Spain) Alexander Toril	(Luxembourg) DKR Engineering	5	4	5	114	6 of 7	24	
2018	(Germany) Jens Petersen (Netherlands) Leonard Hoogenboom	(Luxembourg) DKR Engineering	0	3	4	103	6 of 7	11,5	
2019	(Germany) Laurents Hörr (France) François Kirmann	(Luxembourg) DKR Engineering	4	2	5	100	7 of 7	8,5	
2020	(Germany) Laurents Hörr	(Luxembourg) DKR Engineering	1	3	6	120	7 of 7	15	
2021	(United Kingdom) Anthony Wells (United Kingdom) Colin Noble	(United Kingdom) Nielsen Racing	0	2	3	75	7 of 7	4	
2022	(France) Tom Dillmann (Germany) Alexander Mattschull	(Switzerland) Racing Spirit of Léman	0	3	5	97	7 of 7	24	
2023	(Spain) Julien Gerbi (France) Gillian Henrion	(Poland) Team Virage	1	2	3	73	7 of 7	4	
2024	(Switzerland) David Droux (France) Adrien Chila	(Switzerland) Cool Racing	0	1	2	73.5	7 of 7	5.5	
2025	(France) Hadrien David (Germany) Hugo Schwarze	(France) R-ace GP	3	4	5	116	6 of 7	45	

=== LMP3 Pro-Am Drivers ===
Season	Drivers	Team	Poles	Wins	Podiums	Points	Clinched	Margin	Ref
2025	(Belgium) Eric De Doncker (France) Gillian Henrion	(Belgium) Motorsport98	0	2	5	88	7 of 7	3	

=== GT3 Drivers ===
Season	Drivers	Team	Poles	Wins	Podiums	Points	Clinched	Margin	Ref
2016	(Russia) Aleksey Basov (Russia) Viktor Shaytar	(Russia) SMP Racing	3	4	5	121	5 of 6	14	
2017	(Italy) Fabio Babini (Italy) Emanuele Busnelli	(Italy) Ebimotors	0	2	5	104.5	7 of 7	2	
2018	(Italy) Giacomo Piccini (Italy) Sergio Pianezzola	(Switzerland) Kessel Racing	4	5	5	138	7 of 7	55	
2019	(Italy) Giacomo Piccini (Italy) Sergio Pianezzola	(Switzerland) Kessel Racing	1	4	6	130	7 of 7	21	
2020	(Italy) Rino Mastronardi	(Italy) Iron Lynx	5	4	7	132	6 of 7	15	
2021	(Switzerland) Nicolas Leutwiler	(Switzerland) Pzoberer Zürichsee by TFT	1	2	6	107	7 of 7	10	
2022	(Denmark) Kasper H. Jensen (Denmark) Kristian Poulsen	(Denmark) GMB Motorsport	0	2	5	109	7 of 7	16	
2023	(France) Arnold Robin (France) Valentin Hasse-Clot	(Switzerland) Racing Spirit of Léman	1	1	5	97	7 of 7	20	
2024	(Italy) Alessandro Balzan (United States) Matt Kurzejewski	(Italy) AF Corse	2	4	7	133.5	5 of 7	33.5	
2025	(Italy) Alessandro Cozzi (Italy) Eliseo Donno	(Italy) AF Corse	1	1	6	104	7 of 7	9	

== Teams Championships ==
=== LMP3 Teams ===
Season	Team	Car	Poles	Wins	Podiums	Points	Clinched	Margin	Refs
2017	(Luxembourg) DKR Engineering	Norma M30	5	4	5	114	6 of 7	24	
2018	(Luxembourg) DKR Engineering	Norma M30	0	3	4	103	6 of 7	11.5	
2019	(Luxembourg) DKR Engineering	Norma M30	4	2	5	100	7 of 7	8.5	
2020	(Luxembourg) DKR Engineering	Duqueine M30 - D08	1	3	6	120	7 of 7	31	
2021	(United Kingdom) Nielsen Racing	Ligier JS P320	0	2	3	75	7 of 7	4	
2022	(Switzerland) Racing Spirit of Léman	Ligier JS P320	0	3	5	97	7 of 7	24	
2023	(Poland) Team Virage	Ligier JS P320	1	2	3	73	7 of 7	4	
2024	(Switzerland) Cool Racing	Ligier JS P320	0	1	2	73.5	7 of 7	5.5	
2025	(France) R-ace GP	Duqueine D09	3	4	5	116	6 of 7	45	

=== LMP3 Pro-Am Teams ===
Season	Team	Car	Poles	Wins	Podiums	Points	Clinched	Margin	Refs
2025	(Belgium) Motorsport98	Ligier JS P325	0	2	5	88	7 of 7	3	

=== GT3 Teams ===
Season	Team	Car	Poles	Wins	Podiums	Points	Clinched	Margin	Refs
2016	(United Kingdom) TF Sport	Aston Martin Vantage GT3	0	2	5	107	6 of 6	11	
2017	(Italy) Ebimotors	Lamborghini Huracán GT3	0	2	5	104.5	7 of 7	2	
2018	(Switzerland) Kessel Racing	Ferrari 488 GT3	4	5	5	138	7 of 7	55	
2019	(Switzerland) Kessel Racing	Ferrari 488 GT3	1	4	6	130	7 of 7	21	
2020	(Italy) Iron Lynx	Ferrari 488 GT3	5	4	7	132	6 of 7	40	
2021	(Italy) Iron Lynx	Ferrari 488 GT3	6	5	7	148	6 of 7	41	
2022	(Denmark) GMB Motorsport	Honda NSX GT3 Evo22	0	2	5	109	7 of 7	16	
2023	(Switzerland) Racing Spirit of Léman	Aston Martin Vantage AMR GT3	1	1	5	97	7 of 7	20	
2024	(Italy) AF Corse	Ferrari 296 GT3	2	4	7	133.5	5 of 7	42	
2025	(Italy) AF Corse	Ferrari 296 GT3	1	1	6	104	7 of 7	9	

== Circuits ==
- (Italy) Imola Circuit (2016, 2022)
- (France) Circuit de la Sarthe (2016–present)
- (Austria) Red Bull Ring (2016–2018)
- (France) Circuit Paul Ricard (2016–present)
- (Belgium) Circuit de Spa-Francorchamps (2016–present)
- (Portugal) Circuito do Estoril (2016)
- (Italy) Monza Circuit (2017–2022)
- (Portugal) Algarve International Circuit (2017–present)
- (Spain) Circuit de Barcelona-Catalunya (2019, 2021, 2023–present)
- (Spain) MotorLand Aragón (2023)
- (Italy) Mugello Circuit (2024)
- (United Kingdom) Silverstone Circuit (2025–present))

== See also ==
- European Le Mans Series
- World Sportscar Championship
