= Matteo Cressoni =

Italian racing driver (born 1984)

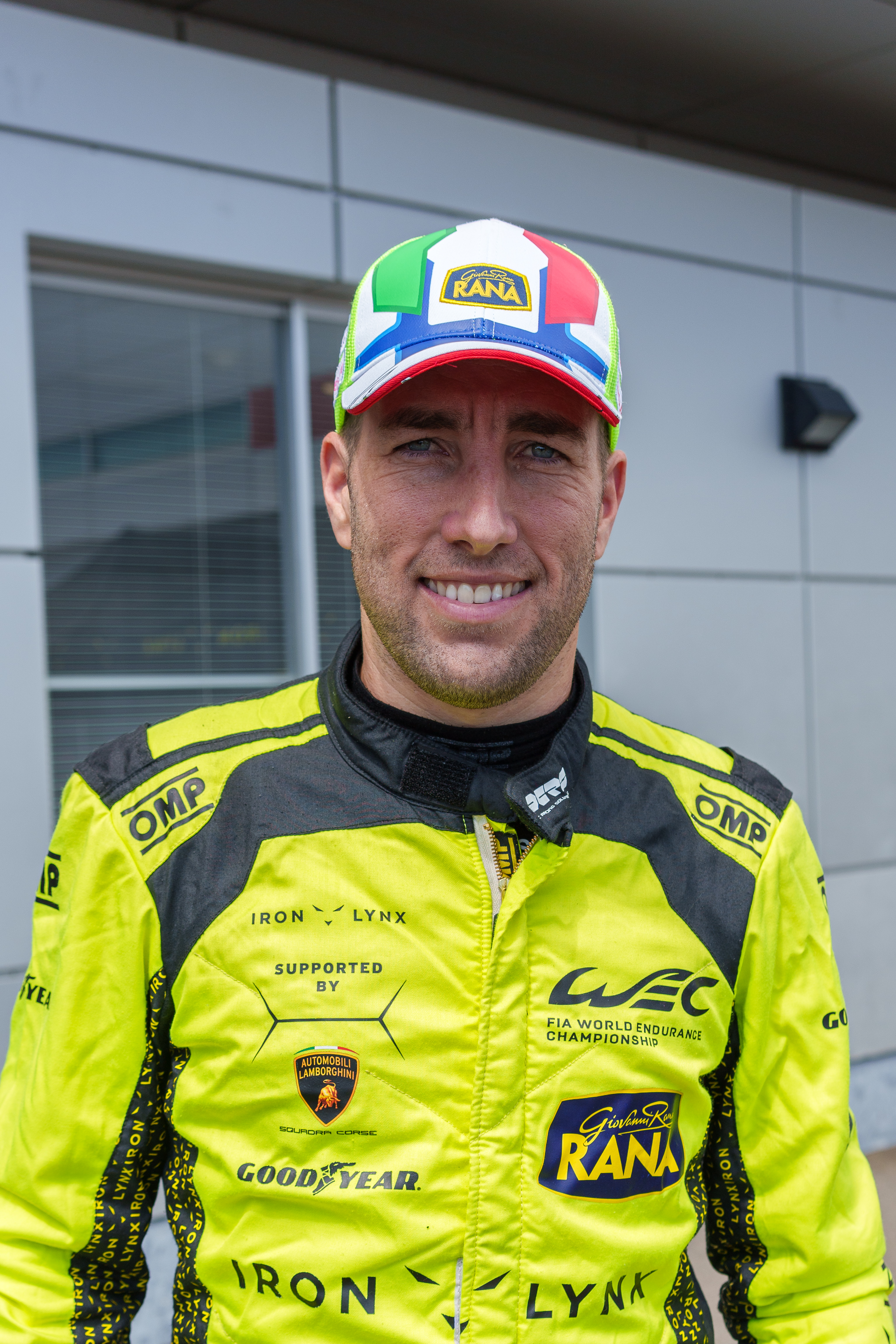
- Cressoni at the 2024 6 Hours of Fuji
- Nationality: (Italy) Italian
- Born: 28 October 1984 (age 42) Mantua, Italy

FIA World Endurance Championship career
- Debut season: 2014
- Current team: Iron Lynx
- Categorisation: FIA Gold (until 2013); FIA Silver (2014–)
- Car number: 60
- Former teams: 8 Star Motorsports, AF Corse
- Starts: 27
- Wins: 0

Matteo Cressoni (born 28 October 1984 in Mantua) is an Italian racing driver. He has competed in such series as the FIA GT Championship, Euroseries 3000, Superstars Series, International GT Open and Formula Renault V6 Eurocup.

== Racing record ==
=== Complete Formula Renault 2000 Italia results ===
(key) (Races in bold indicate pole position; races in italics indicate fastest lap)

Year	Team	1	2	3	4	5	6	7	8	9	10	Pos	Points
2001	System Team	VLL; 26	PER; 12	MAG; DNQ	MNZ; DNQ	MIS; Ret	VAR; DNQ	IMO; Ret	MUG; 12	BIN; DNQ		22nd	10
2001	Bicar Racing										EST; 6	22nd	10
2002	Cram Competition	VLL; 19	PER; 1; 6	PER; 2; 20								20th	12
2002	Bicar Racing				SPA; Ret	MAG; Ret	MNZ; 11	VAR; 11	IMO; Ret	MIS; 30	MUG; 10	20th	12

=== Complete Italian Formula Three Championship results ===
(key) (Races in bold indicate pole position; races in italics indicate fastest lap)

Year	Team	1	2	3	4	5	6	7	8	9	10	11	12	13	14	Pos	Points
2003	W.R.C. / RP Motorsport	MIS	BIN	MAG	IMO; 8	PER; Ret	MUG; 6	VAR; Ret	MNZ; 4	VLL; 14						11th	19
2004	Ombra Racing	ADR; 1	MAG; Ret	PER; 1	MUG; 1; 3	MUG; 2; 2	IMO; 1; 2	IMO; 2; 2	VAR; 2	MNZ; 1 Ret	MNZ; 2; 3	VLL; 1; 4	VLL; 2; 8	**MIS**; **1** Ret	MIS; 2; 5	1st	146

=== Complete European Le Mans Series results ===
(key) (Races in bold indicate pole position) (Races in italics indicate fastest lap)

Year	Team	Class	Car	Engine	1	2	3	4	5	6	DC	Points
2005	BMS Scuderia Italia	GT1	Ferrari 550-GTS Maranello	Ferrari 5.9 L V12	SPA; 1	MNZ; 4	SIL; 5	NÜR; 2	IST; 2		2nd	35
2014	AF Corse	LMGTE	Ferrari 458 Italia GT2	Ferrari 4.5 L V8	SIL; 13	**IMO**; 2	RBR; 2	LEC; 9	EST		9th	39.5
2015	AF Corse	LMGTE	Ferrari 458 Italia GT2	Ferrari 4.5 L V8	SIL; Ret	IMO; 7	**RBR**; 3	LEC; Ret	EST; 7		13th	28
2019	JMW Motorsport	LMGTE	Ferrari 488 GTE	Ferrari F154CB 3.9 L Turbo V8	LEC; 4	MNZ; 2					3rd	74
2019	JMW Motorsport	LMGTE	Ferrari 488 GTE Evo	Ferrari F154CB 3.9 L Turbo V8			CAT; 2	SIL; 6	SPA; 6	ALG; 5	3rd	74
2022	Iron Lynx	LMGTE	Ferrari 488 GTE Evo	Ferrari F154CB 3.9 L Turbo V8	LEC; 7	IMO; 5	MNZ; 1	CAT; 6	SPA; 9	ALG; 4	4th	63
2023	Iron Lynx	LMGTE	Porsche 911 RSR-19	Porsche 4.2 L Flat-6	CAT; 4	LEC; 2	ARA; 7	SPA; 1	PRT; 3	ALG; 8	3rd	80
2024	Proton Competition	LMGT3	Porsche 911 GT3 R (992)	Porsche 4.2 L Flat-6	CAT; 4	LEC; 8	IMO; 11	SPA; 6	MUG; Ret	ALG; 3	13th	39
2025	Proton Competition	LMGT3	Porsche 911 GT3 R (992)	Porsche 4.2 L Flat-6	CAT; 3	LEC; 8	IMO; 5	SPA; Ret	SIL; 5	ALG; 13	10th	39

=== Complete Euroseries 3000 results ===
(key) (Races in bold indicate pole position) (Races in italics indicate fastest lap)

Year	Entrant	1	2	3	4	5	6	7	8	9	10	11	12	13	14	15	16	17	18	DC	Points
2005	BCN Competicion	ADR	VLL	BRN; 4	IMO; Ret	MUG; 5	MAG	MNZ	MIS											12th	9
2006	Vanni Racing/Traini Corse	ADR; 1; 9	ADR; 2 Ret	IMO; 1; 6	IMO; 2 Ret	SPA; 1; 7	SPA; 2; 5	HUN; 1; 6	HUN; 2; 11	MUG; 1; 6	MUG; 2; 2	SIL; 1; 6	SIL; 2; 7	CAT; 1; 10	CAT; 2; 3	VLL; 1; 7	VLL; 2; 7	MIS; 1 DNS	MIS; 2 DNS	8th	27

=== Complete GT1 World Championship results ===
(key) (Races in bold indicate pole position; races in italics indicate fastest lap)

Year	Team	Car	1	2	3	4	5	6	7	8	9	10	11	12	13	14	15	16	17	18	Pos	Points
2012	Sunred	Ford	NOG; QR; 15	NOG; CR; 14	ZOL; QR; DNS	ZOL; CR; 16	NAV; QR; Ret	NAV; QR; Ret	SVK; QR; 7	SVK; CR; 12	ALG; QR; 7	ALG; CR; 9	SVK; QR	SVK; CR	MOS; QR	MOS; CR	NUR; QR	NUR; CR	DON; QR	DON; CR	23rd	2

=== Complete FIA World Endurance Championship results ===
(key) (Races in bold indicate pole position; races in italics indicate fastest lap)

Year	Entrant	Class	Chassis	Engine	1	2	3	4	5	6	7	8	Rank	Points
2014	8 Star Motorsports	LMGTE Am	Ferrari 458 Italia GT2	Ferrari 4.5 L V8	SIL	SPA	LMS	COA	FUJ	SHA; 3	BHR; 5	SÃO; Ret	14th	25
2015	AF Corse	LMGTE Am	Ferrari 458 Italia GT2	Ferrari 4.5 L V8	SIL	SPA	LMS; 5	NÜR	COA	FUJ	SHA	BHR; 4	12th	36
2018–19	Clearwater Racing	LMGTE Am	Ferrari 488 GTE	Ferrari F154CB 3.9 L Turbo V8	SPA	LMS	SIL	FUJ	SHA	SEB; DNS	SPA; 3	LMS; 3	15th	38
2021	Iron Lynx	LMGTE Am	Ferrari 488 GTE Evo	Ferrari F154CB 3.9 L Turbo V8	SPA; 9	ALG; 5	MNZ; Ret	LMS	FUJ; 11	BHR; 5			11th	33.5
2022	Iron Lynx	LMGTE Am	Ferrari 488 GTE Evo	Ferrari F154CB 3.9 L Turbo V8	SEB; 8	SPA; 8	LMS	MNZ; 4	FUJ; 11	BHR; 9			19th	25
2023	Iron Lynx	LMGTE Am	Porsche 911 RSR-19	Porsche 4.2 L Flat-6	SEB; 6	PRT; 12	SPA; 11	LMS; Ret	MNZ; 2	FUJ; 11	BHR; Ret		15th	30
2024	Iron Lynx	LMGT3	Lamborghini Huracán GT3 Evo 2	Lamborghini DGF 5.2 L V10	QAT; 12	IMO; 13	SPA; 3	LMS; 13	SÃO; 14	COA; 12	FUJ; 13	BHR; 4	19th	33
2025	Iron Lynx	LMGT3	Mercedes-AMG GT3 Evo	Mercedes-AMG M159 6.2 L V8	QAT; NC	IMO; 15	SPA	LMS	SÃO	COA	FUJ	BHR	30th	0
2026	Iron Lynx	LMGT3	Mercedes-AMG GT3 Evo	Mercedes-AMG M159 6.2 L V8	IMO; 12	SPA; Ret	LMS; Ret	SÃO; 15	COA; 7	FUJ; 13	CAT; 8	MNZ; 6	20th	18

=== Complete 24 Hours of Le Mans results ===
Year	Team	Co-Drivers	Car	Class	Laps	Pos.	Class Pos.
2015	(Italy) AF Corse	(United States) Peter Ashley Mann (Italy) Raffaele Giammaria	Ferrari 458 Italia GTC	GTE; Am	326	31st	5th
2019	(Singapore) Clearwater Racing	(Republic of Ireland) Matt Griffin (Argentina) Luís Pérez Companc	Ferrari 488 GTE	GTE; Am	331	37th	7th
2020	(Italy) Iron Lynx	(Italy) Rino Mastronardi (Italy) Andrea Piccini	Ferrari 488 GTE Evo	GTE; Am	211	DNF	DNF
2021	(Italy) Iron Lynx	(Italy) Rino Mastronardi (United Kingdom) Callum Ilott	Ferrari 488 GTE Evo	GTE; Am	338	27th	**3rd**
2022	(Italy) Iron Lynx	(Italy) Giancarlo Fisichella (United States) Richard Heistand	Ferrari 488 GTE Evo	GTE; Am	336	46th	13th
2023	(Italy) Iron Lynx	(Belgium) Alessio Picariello (Italy) Claudio Schiavoni	Porsche 911 RSR-19	GTE; Am	28	DNF	DNF
2024	(Italy) Iron Lynx	(France) Franck Perera (Italy) Claudio Schiavoni	Lamborghini Huracán GT3 Evo 2	LMGT3	258	44th	16th
2026	(Italy) Iron Lynx	(Netherlands) Lin Hodenius (Italy) Johannes Zelger	Mercedes-AMG GT3 Evo	LMGT3	153	DNF	DNF

=== Complete IMSA SportsCar Championship results ===
(key) (Races in bold indicate pole position; races in italics indicate fastest lap)

Year	Team	Class	Make	Engine	1	2	3	4	5	6	7	8	9	10	11	12	Rank	Points
2015	Scuderia Corsa	GTD	Ferrari 458 Italia GT3	Ferrari 4.5 L V8	DAY	SEB	LGA	BEL	WGL	LIM	ELK	VIR	AUS	PET; 6			42nd	26
2016	Spirit of Race	GTD	Ferrari 458 Italia GT3	Ferrari 4.5 L V8	DAY; 11	SEB; 9	LGA	BEL	WGL	MOS	LIM	ELK	VIR	AUS	PET		32nd	44
2017	Scuderia Corsa	GTD	Ferrari 488 GT3	Ferrari F154CB 3.9 L Turbo V8	DAY; 16	SEB; 2	LBH	COA	BEL	WGL; 2	MOS	LIM	ELK	VIR	LGA	**PET**; 9	27th	101
2018	Scuderia Corsa	GTD	Ferrari 488 GT3	Ferrari F154CB 3.9 L Turbo V8	DAY	SEB	MOH	BEL	WGL	MOS	LIM	ELK	VIR	LGA	PET; 5		55th	26
2021	AF Corse	GTD	Ferrari 488 GT3 Evo 2020	Ferrari F154CB 3.9 L Turbo V8	DAY; 8	SEB	MDO	DET	WGL	WGL	LIM	ELK	LGA	LBH	VIR	PET	55th	246
2024	Iron Lynx	GTD Pro	Lamborghini Huracán GT3 Evo 2	Lamborghini 5.2 L V10	DAY; 12	SEB; 7	LGA	DET	WGL	MOS	ELK	VIR	IMS	PET			29th	484
2025	Proton Competition	GTD Pro	Porsche 911 GT3 R (992)	Porsche 4.2 L Flat-6	DAY; 10	SEB; 8	LGA	DET	WGL	MOS	ELK	VIR	IMS	PET			24th	477

=== Complete Le Mans Cup results ===
(key) (Races in bold indicate pole position; races in italics indicate fastest lap)

Year	Entrant	Car	Class	1	2	3	4	5	6	7	Pos.	Points
2016	BMS Scuderia Italia	Ferrari 458 Italia GT3	GT3	**IMO**; 6	LMS	RBR	LEC; 10	SPA	EST; 4		9th	22
2018	Kessel Racing	Ferrari 488 GT3	GT3	LEC	MNZ	LMS; 1	LMS; 2	RBR	SPA; 2	ALG	7th	18
2021	AF Corse	Ferrari 488 GT3 Evo 2020	GT3	CAT; 3	LEC; 7	MNZ; 5	LMS; 1	LMS; 2	SPA	ALG	8th	39
2025	Iron Lynx – Proton	Porsche 911 GT3 R (992)	GT3	CAT	LEC	LMS; 1; 5	LMS; 2; 10	SPA	SIL	ALG	NC‡	0‡
2026	Dinamic GT	Porsche 911 GT3 R (992.2)	GT3	CAT; 2	LEC; 7	LMS; 3	SPA; 7	SIL; 3	ALG; 8		5th	76

^{*} Season still in progress.

Sporting positions
Preceded by Fausto Ippoliti	Italian Formula Three Champion; 2004	Succeeded by Luigi Ferrara
Preceded by Michele Beretta; Alessio Picariello; Christian Ried	European Le Mans Series; LMGTE Champion; 2021; With: Miguel Molina & Rino Mastronardi	Succeeded by Incumbent
