= Iron Lynx =

Italian auto racing team

(Italy) Iron Lynx
- Founded: 2017
- Base: Cesena, Emilia-Romagna, Italy
- Team principal(s): Andrea Piccini
- Founder(s): Andrea Piccini; Deborah Mayer; Claudio Schiavoni; Sergio Pianezzola
- Current series: FIA World Endurance Championship; European Le Mans Series; Ligier European Series; FIA WRC2; French Rally Championship
- Former series: Ferrari Challenge; Italian F4 Championship; ADAC Formula 4; Italian GT Championship; GT2 European Series; IMSA SportsCar Championship; GT World Challenge Europe; Michelin Le Mans Cup; Lamborghini Super Trofeo
- Current drivers: FIA World Endurance Championship; 60. (LMGT3); (Italy) Matteo Cairoli; (Italy) Matteo Cressoni; (Italy) Claudio Schiavoni; 61. (LMGT3); (Netherlands) Lin Hodenius; (Belgium) Maxime Martin; (Germany) Christian Ried; (Australia) Martin Berry; 63. (LMGT3); (Australia) Brenton Grove; (Australia) Stephen Grove; (Germany) Luca Stolz; European Le Mans Series; 9. (LMP2); (Italy) Matteo Cairoli; (France) Macéo Capietto; (Germany) Jonas Ried; 63. (LMGT3); (Singapore) Martin Berry; (United Kingdom) Lorcan Hanafin; (Germany) Fabian Schiller; Ligier European Series; 60. (JS P4); (Italy) Gregorio Bertocco; (Italy) Matteo Pianezzola
- Teams' Championships: 4 (European Le Mans Series 2021 LMGTE, 2024 LMGT3, Michelin Le Mans Cup 2020, 2021 GT3)
- Website: www.ironlynx.it

Iron Lynx Motorsport Lab is an Italian auto racing team founded by Andrea Piccini, Deborah Mayer, Claudio Schiavoni and Sergio Pianezzola. The team is based in Cesena, Emilia-Romagna. They primarily participate in sports car racing, and are a sister team of both Iron Dames and Prema Racing under the DC Racing Solutions parent company. Iron Lynx were formerly partnered with Lamborghini in operating their Lamborghini SC63 LMDh prototype.

== History ==
=== 2017 ===
In 2017, the Iron Lynx Motorsport Lab was created by Deborah Mayer, Claudio Schiavoni, Sergio Pianezzola, and Andrea Piccini.

=== 2018 ===
In their first year competing, Iron Lynx placed second and ninth in the Lamborghini Super Trofeo Europe Pro-Am, with one pole position, twelve podiums, and two victories.

Deborah Mayer created the Iron Dames Project, focused on supporting and promoting women in motorsport. Rahel Frey, Michelle Gatting, and Manuela Gostner competed in the 12 Hours of Dubai, placing second in the GT3 Pro-Am class and ninth overall.

=== 2019 ===
For the 2019 season, Iron Lynx continued in the Lamborghini Super Trofeo Europe. They also entered two cars in the Italian GT Championship. The team made their debut in the Le Mans Cup and the European Le Mans Series, racing under the Kessel Racing name in both series. Iron Lynx also entered the Italian F4 Championship with Amna and Hamda Al Qubaisi, under the name Abu Dhabi Racing by Prema.

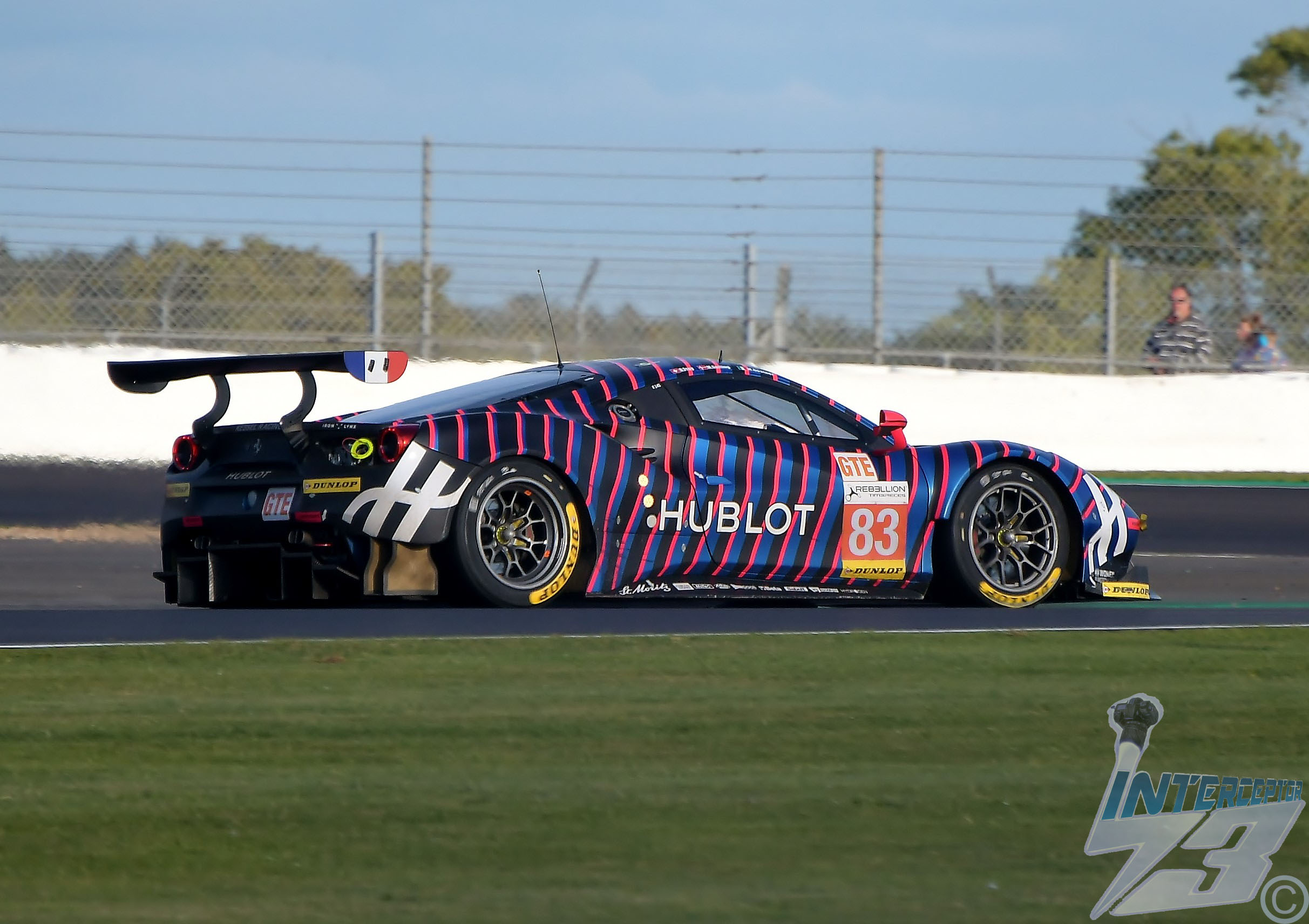
Manuela Gostner driving the Ferrari 488 GTE Evo in the 2019 European Le Mans Series

In the Le Mans Cup, the #8 car placed first, with one pole position and four victories, to earn an automatic entry to the 2020 24 Hours of Le Mans. In the European Le Mans Series, the #83 “Iron Dames” car placed 4th and the #60 placed 6th, with both entries standing on the podium twice over the season. In the 24 Hours of Le Mans, the #83 placed 9th in class, and the #60 placed 13th in class.

=== 2020 ===
2020 marked the first year of the team competing under the Iron Lynx name. In the European Le Mans Series they fielded the #60 of Claudio Schiavoni, Sergio Pianezzola, and Andrea Piccini, as well as the trio of Frey, Gatting, and Gostner for the #83 entry. Gatting and Deborah Mayer teamed up for the Le Mans Cup, the first all-female pairing in the series, and were joined by reigning champions Giacomo Piccini and Rino Mastronardi. Iron Lynx continued in the Italian F4 championship, fielding Hamda Al Qubaisi as Abu Dhabi Racing by Prema, and Leonardo Fernaroli and Yaroslav Shevyrtalov as Iron Lynx. Al Qubaisi and Fernaroli also competed in select ADAC F4 rounds as guest drivers. The team entered the Ferrari Challenge Europe for two rounds, under the name Iron Lynx – Scuderia Niki Hasler. Michelle Gatting competed in the Pro class, while Claudio Schiavoni competed in the Pro-Am class.

The team entered 3 cars in the 24 Hours of Le Mans, including the all-female line-up of Frey, Gatting, and Gostner, who placed 9th in the LMGTE Am class. The other two cars placed 11th and 19th in class. In October 2020, Rino Mastronardi won the GT3 Drivers Championship for Iron Lynx in the Michelin Le Mans Cup to earn an automatic invitation to the 2021 24 Hours of Le Mans.

=== 2021 ===
In 2021, Iron Lynx entered the FIA World Endurance Championship for the first time. In September 2021, it was confirmed that Iron Lynx will be collaborating with Prema Powerteam to enter an Oreca 07 in the World Endurance Championship LMP2 class for 2022. On 24 October 2021, Iron Lynx clinched the LMGTE teams championship in European Le Mans, earning them an automatic invitation to the 2022 24 Hours of Le Mans. On 20 November 2021, Michelle Gatting became the first female champion of the Ferrari Challenge. Iron Lynx also won the Michelin Le Mans Cup teams championship for the second year running to earn a second automatic invitation to the 2022 24 Hours of Le Mans.

=== 2022 ===
The Iron Dames car driven by Rahel Frey, Sarah Bovy and Michelle Gatting at the 2022 24 Hours of Le Mans

On 12 January 2022, Iron Lynx announced that they would enter 2 cars in the GTE Am class of the World Endurance Championship for 2022. Both entries ran the Ferrari 488 GTE Evo, with Claudio Schiavoni returning for the #65 entry while Rahel Frey returned for the #85 Iron Dames entry. On February 16, Iron Lynx announced that Giancarlo Fisichella and Matteo Cressoni would join the WEC campaign, while Davide Rigon joined the ELMS campaign, and Doriane Pin, Arno Dahlmeyer, Marco Pulcini, and Claudio Schiavoni all joined the Ferrari Challenge. The Iron Dames began racing under their own license, fielding a team of Frey, Gatting, and Sarah Bovy in WEC, ELMS, and GTWC Europe Gold Cup. The team continued to support drivers in F4 and karting, with Matteo Pianezzola representing the team in karting, while Maya Weug entering select ADAC F4 rounds, as well as a full season in Italian F4 alongside Ivan Domingues and Nicola Lacorte.

Iron Lynx's and Iron Dames' Ferrari 488 GTE Evo at the 2022 24 Hours of Le Mans

Iron Lynx entered 4 cars in the LMGTE category of the 24 Hours of Le Mans, with a best finish of 7th in class for the #85 Iron Dames car. Sarah Bovy became the first woman to claim a pole position in WEC history, qualifying first at both Monza and Bahrain. Three podiums in the series helped the Iron Dames clinch third place in the GTE Am category. The Iron Dames finished the GTWS Europe season in second in the Gold Cup, with a class victory at the 24 Hours of Spa and a pole position at the final race in Barcelona. The #71 Iron Lynx entry finished second in the Pro class, with one win, four podiums, and two pole positions, while the #51 finished seventh with one podium. In the European Le Mans Series, both entries took a class victory, with the #85 finishing third and the #60 finishing fourth in the LMGTE teams championship. Doriane Pin took a dominant victory in the Ferrari Challenge, winning nine of fourteen races, with thirteen podiums, ten pole positions, and eleven fastest laps.

=== 2023 ===
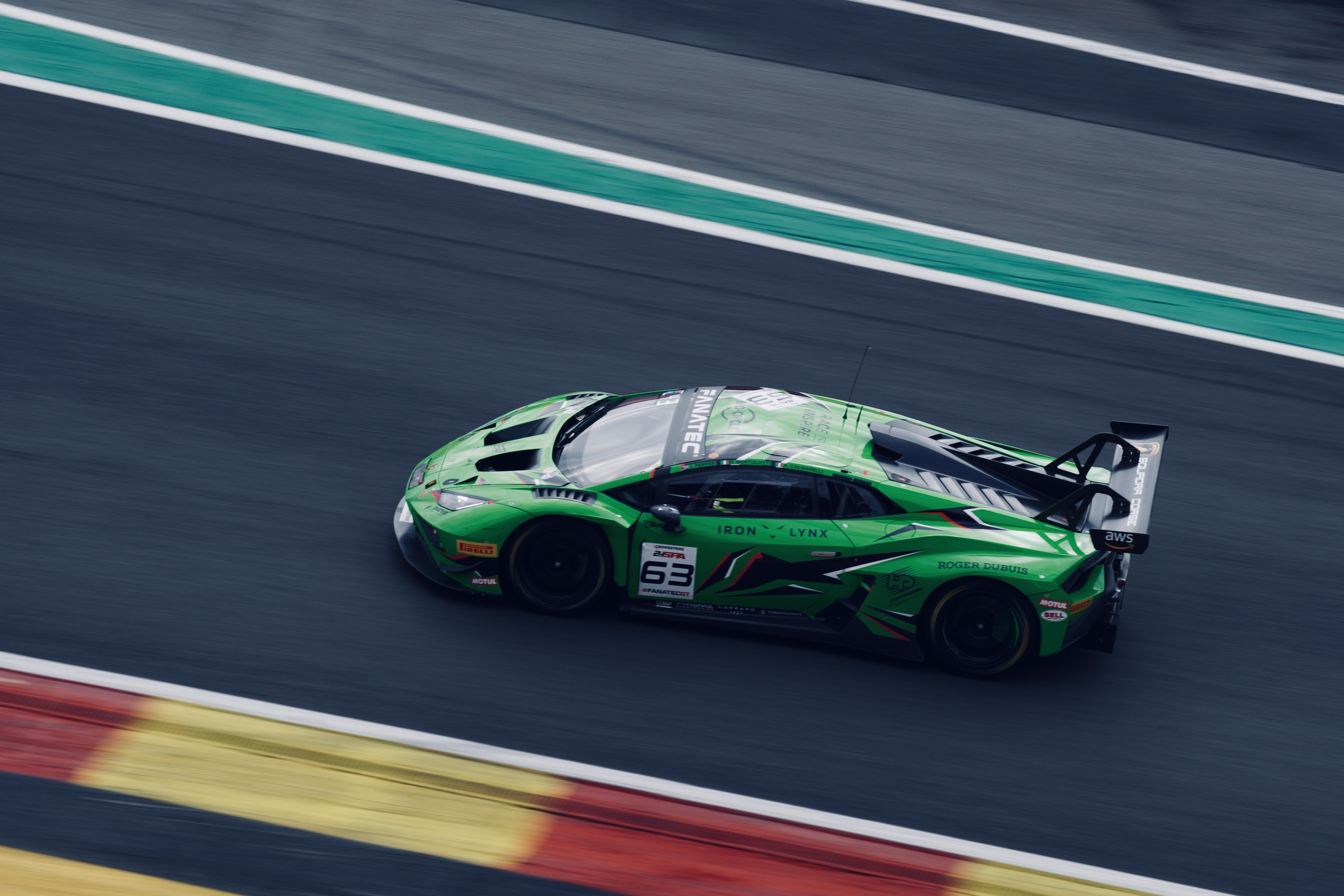
Iron Lynx's #63 Lamborghini Huracán GT3 during the 2023 24 Hours of Spa

On 6 November 2022, Iron Lynx announced they became the Lamborghini factory team from 2023. They entered the Lamborghini Huracán GT3 EVO 2 of the IMSA Sportscar Championship and GT World Challenge for 2023. Iron Lynx also entered the FIA World Endurance Championship, using two Porsche 911 RSR-19s as Lamborghini does not actively manufacture a car under GTE specifications. At the 2023 8 Hours of Bahrain, Iron Dames became the final LM GTE class race winning team. Their drivers – Sarah Bovy, Michelle Gatting, and Rahel Frey – became the first all-female lineup to win a FIA WEC race.

=== 2024 ===
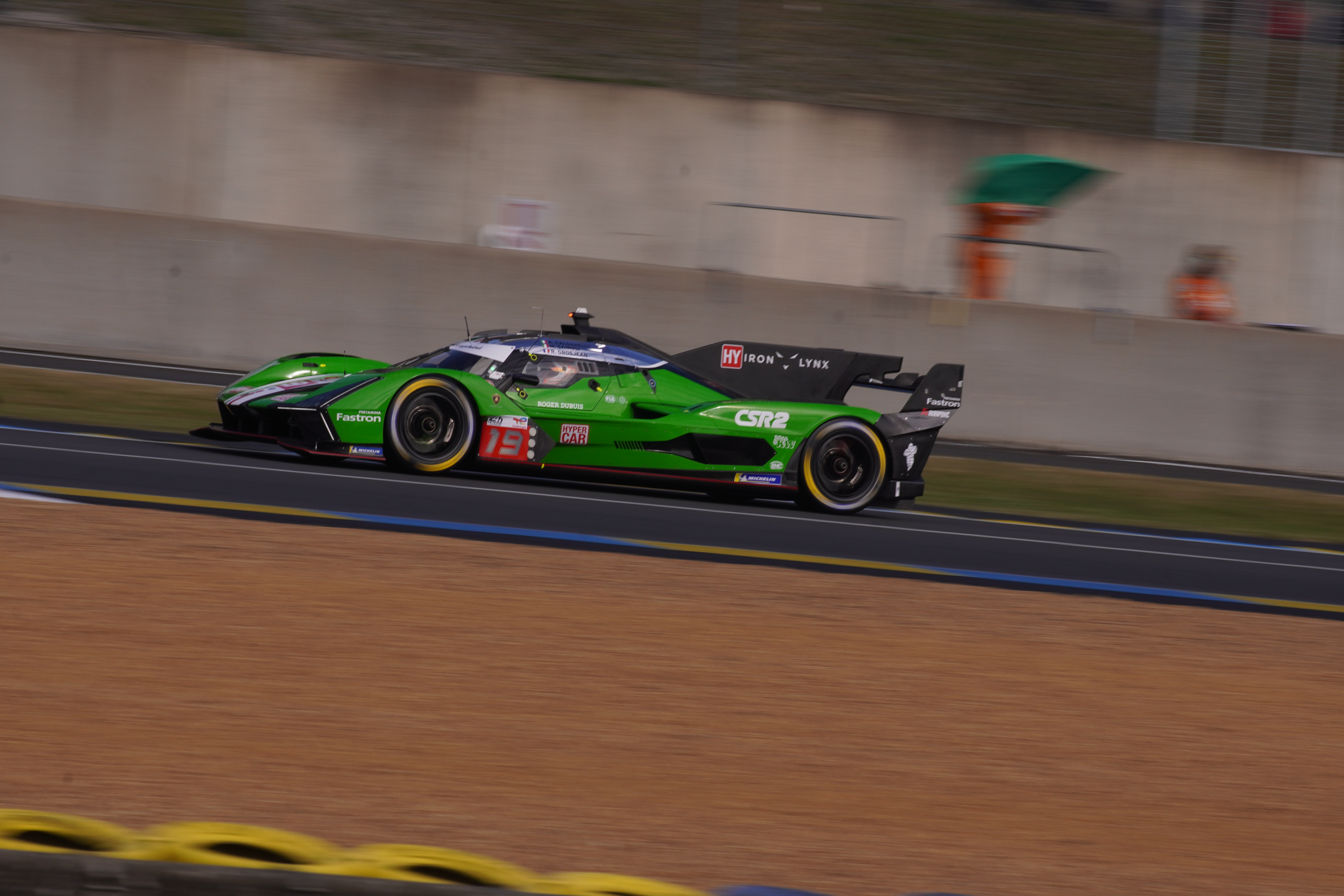
The #19 Lamborghini SC63 during practice at the 2024 24 Hours of Le Mans

In 2024, Iron Lynx made the move to competing with the new Lamborghini SC63 Hypercar in the IMSA Sports Car Championship in the GTP class, appearing at the 72nd annual 12 Hours of Sebring where they scored a 7th place finish. Additionally, with the demise of LMGTE regulations at the end of 2023, the team also ran a pair of Huracán GT3 EVO 2s in the World Endurance Championship under the new LMGT3 class. Iron Dames also entered the Formula Regional European Championship for the first time, with Marta García and Doriane Pin racing for them. In November of 2024, Lamborghini announced their departure from the World Endurance Championship. This meant that the Huracán GT3 EVO 2 and SC63 Hypercar would not return in 2025. However, Iron Lynx will still be running the SC63 in the IMSA Sports Car Championship in the GTP class. On the 20th of November, it was announced that Iron Lynx will be partnering up with Mercedes-AMG and run the current Mercedes-AMG GT3 Evo for the 2025 FIA World Endurance Championship. This will mark Mercedes-AMG's first appearance in the series in 25 years. The next day, it was announced that Iron Dames would be joining forces with WEC LMGT3 champions Manthey Racing, running one of their Porsche 911 GT3 R race cars for 2025.

=== 2025 ===
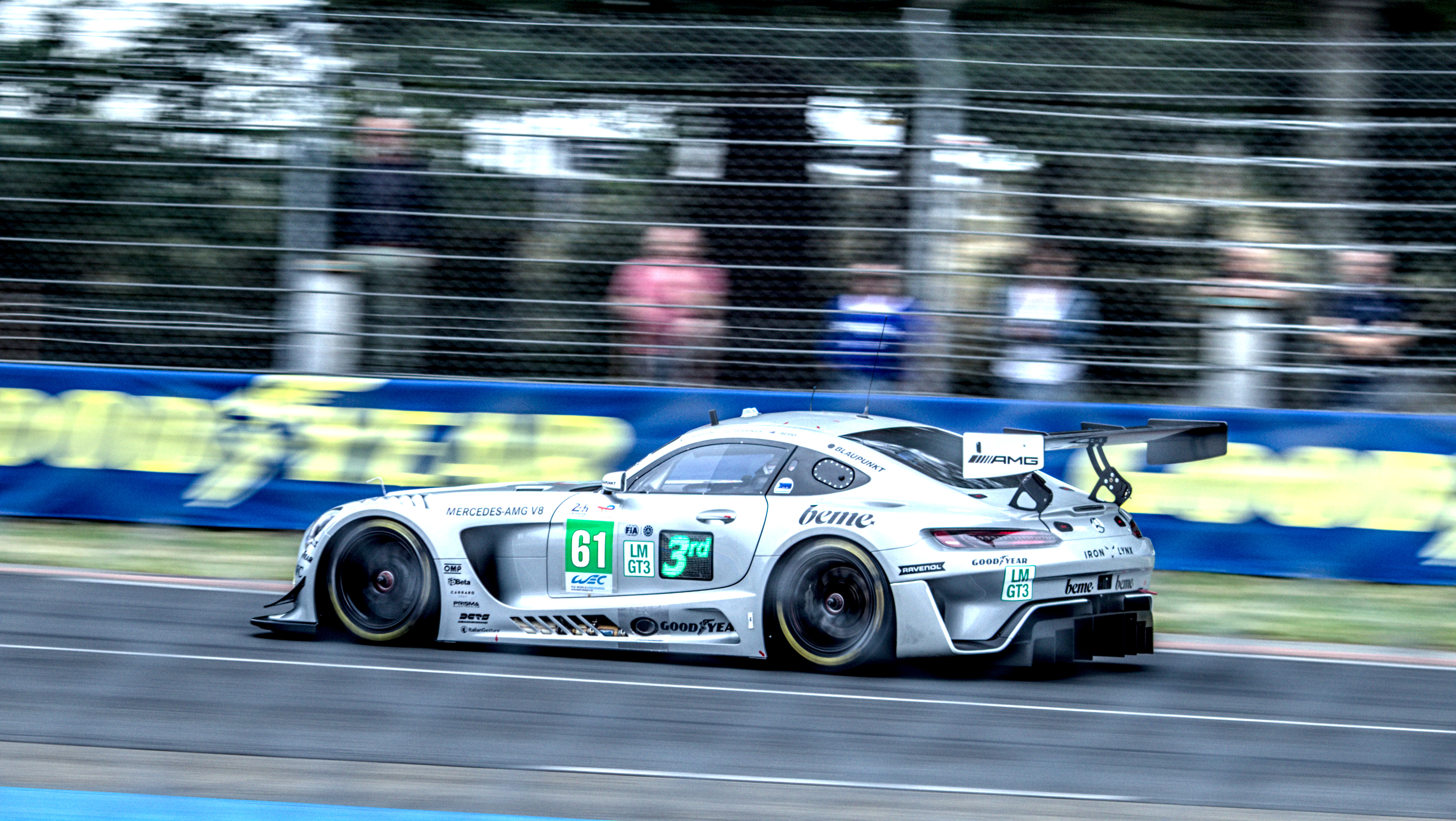
The #61 Mercedes-AMG GT3 Evo during the race at the 2025 24 Hours of Le Mans

With Lamborghini leaving the FIA World Endurance Championship in 2025, Iron Lynx gained backing from debutant Mercedes-AMG for two LMGT3 entries. The Iron Dames expanded their rally program, with Sarah Rumeau and Julie Amblard joining the WRC2 Championship and continuing in the French Rally Championship.

== Current series results ==
=== 24 Hours of Le Mans ===
Year	Entrant	No.	Car	Drivers	Class	Laps	Pos.	Class Pos.
2019	(Switzerland) Kessel Racing	60	Ferrari 488 GTE	(Italy) Sergio Pianezzola (Italy) Andrea Piccini (Italy) Claudio Schiavoni	LMGTE Am	324	46th	13th
2019	(Switzerland) Kessel Racing	83	Ferrari 488 GTE	(Switzerland) Rahel Frey (Denmark) Michelle Gatting (Italy) Manuela Gostner	LMGTE Am	330	39th	9th
2020	(Italy) Iron Lynx	60	Ferrari 488 GTE Evo	(Italy) Sergio Pianezzola (Italy) Paolo Ruberti (Italy) Claudio Schiavoni	LMGTE Am	331	37th	11th
2020	(Italy) Iron Lynx	75	Ferrari 488 GTE Evo	(Italy) Matteo Cressoni (Italy) Rino Mastronardi (Italy) Andrea Piccini	LMGTE Am	211	DNF	DNF
2020	(Italy) Iron Lynx	85	Ferrari 488 GTE Evo	(Switzerland) Rahel Frey (Denmark) Michelle Gatting (Italy) Manuela Gostner	LMGTE Am	332	34th	9th
2021	(Italy) Iron Lynx	60	Ferrari 488 GTE Evo	(Italy) Raffaele Giammaria (Italy) Paolo Ruberti (Italy) Claudio Schiavoni	LMGTE Am	335	30th	4th
2021	(Italy) Iron Lynx	80	Ferrari 488 GTE Evo	(Italy) Matteo Cressoni (United Kingdom) Callum Ilott (Italy) Rino Mastronardi	LMGTE Am	338	27th	3rd
2021	(Italy) Iron Lynx	85	Ferrari 488 GTE Evo	(Belgium) Sarah Bovy (Switzerland) Rahel Frey (Denmark) Michelle Gatting	LMGTE Am	332	36th	9th
2022	(Italy) Iron Lynx	60	Ferrari 488 GTE Evo	(Italy) Alessandro Balzan (Italy) Raffaele Giammaria (Italy) Claudio Schiavoni	LMGTE Am	289	NC	NC
2022	(Italy) Iron Lynx	75	Ferrari 488 GTE Evo	(Germany) Pierre Ehret (Germany) Christian Hook (Argentina) Nicolás Varrone	LMGTE Am	324	53rd	17th
2022	(Italy) Iron Lynx	80	Ferrari 488 GTE Evo	(Italy) Matteo Cressoni (Italy) Giancarlo Fisichella (United States) Richard Heistand	LMGTE Am	336	46th	13th
2022	(Italy) Iron Dames	85	Ferrari 488 GTE Evo	(Belgium) Sarah Bovy (Switzerland) Rahel Frey (Denmark) Michelle Gatting	LMGTE Am	339	40th	7th
2023	(Italy) Iron Lynx	60	Porsche 911 RSR-19	(Italy) Matteo Cressoni (Belgium) Alessio Picariello (Italy) Claudio Schiavoni	LMGTE Am	28	DNF	DNF
2023	(Italy) Iron Dames	85	Porsche 911 RSR-19	(Belgium) Sarah Bovy (Switzerland) Rahel Frey (Denmark) Michelle Gatting	LMGTE Am	312	30th	4th
2024	(Italy) Lamborghini Iron Lynx	19	Lamborghini SC63	(Italy) Matteo Cairoli (Italy) Andrea Caldarelli (France) Romain Grosjean	Hypercar	309	13th	13th
2024	(Italy) Lamborghini Iron Lynx	63	Lamborghini SC63	(Italy) Mirko Bortolotti; Daniil Kvyat (Italy) Edoardo Mortara	Hypercar	309	10th	10th
2024	(Germany) Proton Competition	9	Oreca 07-Gibson	(France) Macéo Capietto (Germany) Jonas Ried (Netherlands) Bent Viscaal	LMP2	86	DNF	DNF
2024	(Italy) Iron Lynx	60	Lamborghini Huracán GT3 Evo 2	(Italy) Matteo Cressoni (France) Franck Perera (Italy) Claudio Schiavoni	LMGT3	258	44th	16th
2024	(Italy) Iron Dames	85	Lamborghini Huracán GT3 Evo 2	(Belgium) Sarah Bovy (Switzerland) Rahel Frey (Denmark) Michelle Gatting	LMGT3	279	32nd	5th
2025	(Germany) Iron Lynx – Proton	9	Oreca 07-Gibson	(France) Macéo Capietto (France) Reshad de Gerus (Germany) Jonas Ried	LMP2	365	21st	4th
2025	(Italy) Iron Lynx	60	Mercedes-AMG GT3 Evo	(United Kingdom) Andrew Gilbert (United Kingdom) Lorcan Hanafin (Spain) Fran Rueda	LMGT3	57	DNF	DNF
2025	(Italy) Iron Lynx	61	Mercedes-AMG GT3 Evo	(Australia) Martin Berry (Netherlands) Lin Hodenius (Belgium) Maxime Martin	LMGT3	337	44th	12th
2025	(Italy) Iron Lynx	63	Mercedes-AMG GT3 Evo	(Australia) Brenton Grove (Australia) Stephen Grove (Germany) Luca Stolz	LMGT3	334	47th	15th
2026	(Italy) Iron Lynx	61	Mercedes-AMG GT3 Evo	(Angola) Rui Andrade (Australia) Martin Berry (Belgium) Maxime Martin	LMGT3	65	DNF	DNF
2026	(Italy) Iron Lynx	79	Mercedes-AMG GT3 Evo	(Italy) Matteo Cressoni (Netherlands) Lin Hodenius (Italy) Johannes Zelger	LMGT3	153	DNF	DNF
2026	Team Qatar by Iron Lynx	62	Mercedes-AMG GT3 Evo	(Qatar) Abdulla Al-Khelaifi (France) Giuliano Alesi (Germany) Julian Hanses	LMGT3	324	48th	16th

=== Complete FIA World Endurance Championship results ===
Year	Entrant	Class	No	Chassis	Engine	Drivers	1	2	3	4	5	6	7	8	Pos.	Pts
2021	(Italy) Iron Lynx	LMGTE Am	60	Ferrari 488 GTE Evo	Ferrari F154CB 3.9 L Turbo V8	(Italy) Claudio Schiavoni (Italy) Matteo Cressoni (Italy) Andrea Piccini (Italy) Raffaele Giammaria (Italy) Paolo Ruberti (Italy) Rino Mastronardi	SPA; 9	POR; 6	MON; Ret	LMN; 4	BHR; 12	BHR; 6			7th	63.5
2021	(Italy) Iron Lynx	LMGTE Am	85	Ferrari 488 GTE Evo	Ferrari F154CB 3.9 L Turbo V8	(Switzerland) Rahel Frey (Italy) Manuela Gostner (United Kingdom) Katherine Legge (Denmark) Michelle Gatting (Belgium) Sarah Bovy	SPA; 8	POR; 7	MON; 8	LMN; 3	BHR; 8	BHR; 9			10th	46
2022	(Italy) Iron Lynx	LMGTE Am	60	Ferrari 488 GTE Evo	Ferrari F154CB 3.9 L Turbo V8	(Italy) Claudio Schiavoni (Italy) Matteo Cressoni (Italy) Giancarlo Fisichella (Italy) Alessandro Balzan (Italy) Raffaele Giammaria	SEB; 8	SPA; 8	LMN; Ret	MON; 4	FUJ; 11	BHR; 9			12th	25
2022	(Italy) Iron Dames	LMGTE Am	85	Ferrari 488 GTE Evo	Ferrari F154CB 3.9 L Turbo V8	(Switzerland) Rahel Frey (Belgium) Sarah Bovy (Denmark) Michelle Gatting (Denmark) Christina Nielsen (France) Doriane Pin	SEB; 4	SPA; 10	LMN; 7	MON; 2	FUJ; 2	BHR; 3			3rd	93
2023	(Italy) Iron Lynx	LMGTE Am	60	Porsche 911 RSR-19	Porsche 4.2 L Flat-6	(Italy) Claudio Schiavoni (Italy) Matteo Cressoni (Belgium) Alessio Picariello	SEB; 6	POR; 12	SPA; 11	LMN; Ret	MON; 2	FUJ; 11	BHR; Ret		13th	30
2023	(Italy) Iron Dames	LMGTE Am	85	Porsche 911 RSR-19	Porsche 4.2 L Flat-6	(Belgium) Sarah Bovy (Denmark) Michelle Gatting (Switzerland) Rahel Frey	SEB; 8	POR; 3	SPA; 5	LMN; 4	MON; 5	FUJ; 4	BHR; 1		2nd	118
2024	(Italy) Lamborghini Iron Lynx	Hypercar	63	Lamborghini SC63	Lamborghini 3.8 L Turbo V8	(Italy) Mirko Bortolotti; Daniil Kvyat (Italy) Edoardo Mortara (Italy) Andrea Caldarelli	QAT; 13	IMO; 12	SPA; Ret	LMN; 10	SAP; 17	COTA; 14	FUJ; Ret	BHR; Ret	8th	11
2024	(Italy) Iron Lynx	LMGT3	60	Lamborghini Hurácan GT3 Evo 2	Lamborghini DGF 5.2 L V10	(Italy) Matteo Cressoni (France) Franck Perera (Italy) Claudio Schiavoni	QAT; 12	IMO; 13	SPA; 3	LMN; 12	SAP; 14	COTA; 12	FUJ; 13	BHR; 4	15th	33
2024	(Italy) Iron Dames	LMGT3	85	Lamborghini Hurácan GT3 Evo 2	Lamborghini DGF 5.2 L V10	(Belgium) Sarah Bovy (Denmark) Michelle Gatting (France) Doriane Pin (Switzerland) Rahel Frey	QAT; 8	IMO; Ret	SPA; 5	LMN; 4	SAP; Ret	COTA; 13	FUJ; 5	BHR; 10	8th	54
2025	(Italy) Iron Lynx	LMGT3	60	Mercedes-AMG GT3 Evo	Mercedes-AMG M159 6.2 L V8	(Italy) Matteo Cairoli (Italy) Matteo Cressoni (Italy) Claudio Schiavoni (Australia) Brenton Grove (Australia) Stephen Grove (United Kingdom) Andrew Gilbert (United Kingdom) Lorcan Hanafin (Spain) Fran Rueda	QAT; NC	IMO; 15	SPA; 12	LMN; Ret	SAP; 15	COTA; 10	FUJ; 16	BHR; 13	18th	1
2025	(Italy) Iron Lynx	LMGT3	61	Mercedes-AMG GT3 Evo	Mercedes-AMG M159 6.2 L V8	(Netherlands) Lin Hodenius (Belgium) Maxime Martin (Germany) Christian Ried (Australia) Martin Berry	QAT; Ret	IMO; 13	SPA; 11	LMN; 8	SAP; Ret	COTA; Ret	FUJ; 8	BHR; 2	13th	39
2026	(Italy) Iron Lynx	LMGT3	61	Mercedes-AMG GT3 Evo	Mercedes-AMG M159 6.2 L V8	(Angola) Rui Andrade (Australia) Martin Berry (Belgium) Maxime Martin	IMO; Ret	SPA; 10	LMN; Ret	SAP; 6	COTA; 6	FUJ; Ret	CAT	MNZ	14th*	17*
2026	(Italy) Iron Lynx	LMGT3	79	Mercedes-AMG GT3 Evo	Mercedes-AMG M159 6.2 L V8	(Italy) Matteo Cressoni (Netherlands) Lin Hodenius (Italy) Johannes Zelger	IMO; 12	SPA; Ret	LMN; Ret	SAP; 15	COTA; 7	FUJ; 13	CAT	MNZ	18th*	6*

* Season still in progress

=== European Le Mans Series ===
Year	Entrant	Class	No	Chassis	Drivers	1	2	3	4	5	6	Pos.	Pts
2019	(Switzerland) Kessel Racing	LMGTE	60	Ferrari 488 GTE 1–2; Ferrari 488 GTE Evo 3–6	(Italy) Claudio Schiavoni (Italy) Giacomo Piccini (Italy) Sergio Pianezzola (Italy) Nicola Cadei (Italy) Andrea Piccini (South Africa) David Perel	LEC; 9	MNZ; Ret	BAR; 8	SIL; 3	SPA; 5	POR; 2	6th	50
2019	(Switzerland) Kessel Racing	LMGTE	83	Ferrari 488 GTE 1–2; Ferrari 488 GTE Evo 3–6	(Italy) Manuela Gostner (Denmark) Michelle Gatting (Switzerland) Rahel Frey	LEC; 2	MNZ; 6	BAR; 4	SIL; 2	SPA; 4	POR; Ret	4th	68
2020	(Italy) Iron Lynx	LMGTE	60	Ferrari 488 GTE Evo	(Italy) Claudio Schiavoni (Italy) Rino Mastronardi (Italy) Sergio Pianezzola (Denmark) Nicklas Nielsen (Italy) Andrea Piccini	RIC; 6	SPA; Ret	LEC; 5	MNZ; Ret	POR; 3		7th	35
2020	(Italy) Iron Lynx	LMGTE	83	Ferrari 488 GTE Evo	(Italy) Manuela Gostner (Denmark) Michelle Gatting (Switzerland) Rahel Frey	RIC; 3	SPA; 8	LEC; 3	MNZ; 3	POR; 6		4th	61
2021	(Italy) Iron Lynx	LMGTE	60	Ferrari 488 GTE Evo	(Italy) Paolo Ruberti (Italy) Claudio Schiavoni (Italy) Giorgio Sernagiotto	CAT; 5	RBR; 7	LEC; 5	MNZ; 5	SPA; 5	POR; 8	8th	50
2021	(Italy) Iron Lynx	LMGTE	80	Ferrari 488 GTE Evo	(Italy) Matteo Cressoni (Italy) Rino Mastronardi (Spain) Miguel Molina	CAT; 1	RBR; 3	LEC; 1	MNZ; 2	SPA; 2	POR; 1	1st	126
2021	(Italy) Iron Lynx	LMGTE	83	Ferrari 488 GTE Evo	(Italy) Manuela Gostner (Denmark) Michelle Gatting (Switzerland) Rahel Frey (Belgium) Sarah Bovy	CAT; 4	RBR; NC	LEC; NC	MNZ; 6	SPA; 3	POR; 3	7th	50
2022	(Italy) Iron Lynx	LMGTE	60	Ferrari 488 GTE Evo	(Italy) Matteo Cressoni (Italy) Davide Rigon (Italy) Claudio Schiavoni	LEC; 7	IMO; 5	MNZ; 1	CAT; 6	SPA; 9	POR; 4	4th	63
2022	(Italy) Iron Lynx	LMGTE	83	Ferrari 488 GTE Evo	(France) Doriane Pin (Denmark) Michelle Gatting (Switzerland) Rahel Frey (Belgium) Sarah Bovy	LEC; 4	IMO; 8	MNZ; 5	CAT; Ret	SPA; 2	POR; 1	3rd	70
2023	(Italy) Iron Lynx	LMGTE	60	Porsche 911 RSR-19	(Italy) Matteo Cairoli (Italy) Matteo Cressoni (Italy) Claudio Schiavoni	CAT; 4	LEC; 2	ARA; 7	SPA; 1	ALG; 3	POR; 8	3rd	80
2024	(Germany) Iron Lynx – Proton	LMP2	9	Oreca 07-Gibson	(Italy) Matteo Cairoli (France) Macéo Capietto (Germany) Jonas Ried	BAR; Ret	LEC; 9	IMO; Ret	SPA; 7	MUG; 1	POR; 9	8th	36
2024	(Germany) Proton Competition	LMGT3	60	Porsche 911 GT3 R (992)	(France) Julien Andlauer (Italy) Matteo Cressoni (Italy) Claudio Schiavoni	BAR; 4	LEC; 8	IMO; 11	SPA; 6	MUG; Ret	POR; 3	10th	39
2024	(Germany) Iron Dames	LMGT3	85	Porsche 911 GT3 R (992)	(Denmark) Michelle Gatting (Switzerland) Rahel Frey (Belgium) Sarah Bovy	BAR; Ret	LEC; 4	IMO; 1	SPA; Ret	MUG; 7	POR; 2	4th	65
2024	(Italy) Iron Lynx	LMGT3	63	Lamborghini Huracán GT3 Evo 2	(Italy) Andrea Caldarelli (Japan) Hiroshi Hamaguchi (Zimbabwe) Axcil Jefferies	BAR; 3	LEC; 2	IMO; 3	SPA; Ret	MUG; 9	POR; 1	1st	76
2025	(Germany) Iron Lynx – Proton	LMP2	9	Oreca 07-Gibson	(Italy) Matteo Cairoli (France) Macéo Capietto (Germany) Jonas Ried	BAR; 11	LEC; Ret	IMO; 4	SPA; 8	SIL; 7	POR; 5	9th	35
2025	(Italy) Iron Lynx	LMGT3	63	Mercedes-AMG GT3 Evo	(Singapore) Martin Berry (United Kingdom) Lorcan Hanafin (Germany) Fabian Schiller	BAR; Ret	LEC; 2	IMO; Ret	SPA; 2	SIL; Ret	POR; 4	7th	51
2026	Team Qatar by Iron Lynx	LMGT3	62	Mercedes-AMG GT3 Evo	(Qatar) Abdulla Al-Khelaifi (Germany) Julian Hanses (United Kingdom) Adam Christodoulou (Belgium) Maxime Martin (Estonia) Ralf Aron	BAR; 4	LEC; Ret	IMO; 2	SPA; 3	SIL; 1	POR	1st*	73*
2026	(Italy) Iron Lynx	LMGT3	63	Mercedes-AMG GT3 Evo	(Angola) Rui Andrade (Zimbabwe) Ameerh Naran (Brazil) Sérgio Sette Câmara	BAR; 7	LEC; 6	IMO; Ret	SPA; 8	SIL; Ret	POR	11th*	18*

* Season still in progress

=== Le Mans Cup ===
Year	Entrant	Class	No	Chassis	Drivers	1	2	3	4	5	6	7	Pos.	Pts
2020	(Italy) Iron Lynx	GT3	8	Ferrari 488 GT3	(Denmark) Nicklas Nielsen (Italy) Giacomo Piccini (Italy) Rino Mastronardi	RIC; 1	SPA; 1	LEC; 3	LMS; 1	LMS; 3	MNZ; 3	POR; 1	1st	132
2020	(Italy) Iron Lynx	GT3	9	Ferrari 488 GT3	(France) Deborah Mayer (Italy) Emanuele Maria Tabacchi (Italy) Paolo Ruberti (Denmark) Michelle Gatting (Italy) Niccolò Schirò (Russia) Murad Sultanov	RIC; 5	SPA; Ret	LEC	LMS; Ret	LMS; 5	MNZ; 2	POR; WD	7th	33
2020	(Italy) Iron Lynx	GT3	77	Ferrari 488 GT3	(Italy) Claudio Schiavoni (Italy) Andrea Piccini (Republic of Ireland) Matt Griffin	RIC; 3	SPA; DNS	LEC; 5	LMS; 3	LMS; 4	MNZ; 5	POR; WD	6th	48
2021	(Italy) Iron Lynx	GT3	8	Ferrari 488 GT3 Evo 2020	(Italy) Rino Mastronardi (Italy) Paolo Ruberti (Italy) Gabriele Lancieri (United States) Logan Sargeant (Finland) Rory Penttinen	BAR; 2	LEC; 1	MNZ; 1	LMS; 1	LMS; 2	SPA; 1	POR; 1	1st	148
2021	(Italy) Iron Lynx	GT3	9	Ferrari 488 GT3 Evo 2020	(Italy) Manuela Gostner (Belgium) Sarah Bovy (France) Doriane Pin	BAR; DNS	LEC; 2	MNZ; 2	LMS; 2	LMS; 3	SPA; 3	POR; Ret	3rd	67
2023	(Italy) Iron Lynx	GT3	60	Lamborghini Hurácan GT3 Evo 2	(Japan) Hiroshi Hamaguchi (Monaco) Vincent Abril	BAR; 7	LMS; Ret	LMS; Ret	LEC; 3	ARA	SPA; Ret	POR; 1	6th	48
2024	(Italy) Iron Dames	GT3	85	Lamborghini Hurácan GT3 Evo 2	(France) Célia Martin (Switzerland) Karen Gaillard	BAR; 7	LEC; 2	LMS; 7	LMS; 16	SPA; 11	MUG; 5	POR; 7	6th	43

* Season still in progress

== Former series results ==
=== Italian F4 Championship ===
Year	Car	Drivers	Races	Wins	Poles	F/Laps	Podiums	Points	D.C.	T.C.
2019	Tatuus F4-T014	(United Arab Emirates) Hamda Al Qubaisi	6	0	0	0	0	0	42nd	NC (Note: Entered as Abu Dhabi Racing by Prema)
2019	Tatuus F4-T014	(United Arab Emirates) Amna Al Qubaisi	21	0	0	0	0	0	31st	NC
2020	Tatuus F4-T014	(Italy) Leonardo Fornaroli	20	0	0	1	1	108	9th	5th
2020	Tatuus F4-T014	(Russia) Yaroslav Shervyrtalov	5	0	0	0	0	0	36th	5th
2020	Tatuus F4-T014	(United Arab Emirates) Hamda Al Qubaisi	19	0	0	0	0	3	25th	11th
2021	Tatuus F4-T014	(Poland) Kacper Sztuka	21	0	0	0	0	0	36th†	5th
2021	Tatuus F4-T014	(Italy) Leonardo Fornaroli	21	1	2	3	7	180	5th	5th
2021	Tatuus F4-T014	(Italy) Pietro Armanni	21	0	0	0	0	8	25th	5th
2021	Tatuus F4-T014	(Spain) Maya Weug	21	0	0	0	0	0	35th	5th
2022	Tatuus F4-T421	(Portugal) Ivan Domingues	19	0	1	0	0	21	15th	6th
2022	Tatuus F4-T421	(Italy) Nicola Lacorte	8	0	0	0	0	1	28th	6th
2022	Tatuus F4-T421	(Spain) Maya Weug	20	0	0	0	0	36	14th	5th (Note: Entered as Iron Dames)

† Shared results with other team

=== ADAC Formula 4 Championship ===
Year	Car	Drivers	Races	Wins	Poles	F/Laps	Podiums	Points	D.C.	T.C.
2020	Tatuus F4-T014	(Italy) Leonardo Fornaroli	3	0	0	0	0	0	NC†	N/A†
2020	Tatuus F4-T014	(United Arab Emirates) Hamda Al Qubaisi	3	0	0	0	0	0	NC†	N/A†
2021	Tatuus F4-T014	(Italy) Leonardo Fornaroli	6	0	0	0	1	0	NC†	N/A†
2021	Tatuus F4-T014	(Italy) Pietro Armanni	3	0	0	0	0	0	NC†	N/A†
2021	Tatuus F4-T014	(Spain) Maya Weug	3	0	0	0	0	0	NC†	N/A†
2022	Tatuus F4-T421	(Netherlands) Maya Weug	6	0	0	0	0	0	NC†	N/A†

† Ineligible to score points.

== Timeline ==
Current series
Lamborghini Super Trofeo Europe	2018–2019, 2022–present
Le Mans Cup	2020–2021, 2023–present
European Le Mans Series	2019–present
FIA World Endurance Championship	2021–present
GT World Challenge Europe Endurance Cup	2021–present
IMSA SportsCar Championship	2023–present
Lamborghini Super Trofeo Asia	2023–present
French Rally Championship	2024–present
Ligier European Series	2024–present
WRC2 Championship	2025–present
24H Series	2025–present
International GT Open	2025–present
Former Series
SuperCars Series Trophy	2019
Italian F4 Championship	2019–2022
ADAC Formula 4	2020–2022
Ferrari Challenge Europe	2020–2022
Italian GT Championship	2019, 2021, 2023
GT2 European Series	2023
Formula Regional European Championship	2024
