= Giacomo Piccini =

Italian racing driver (born 1985)

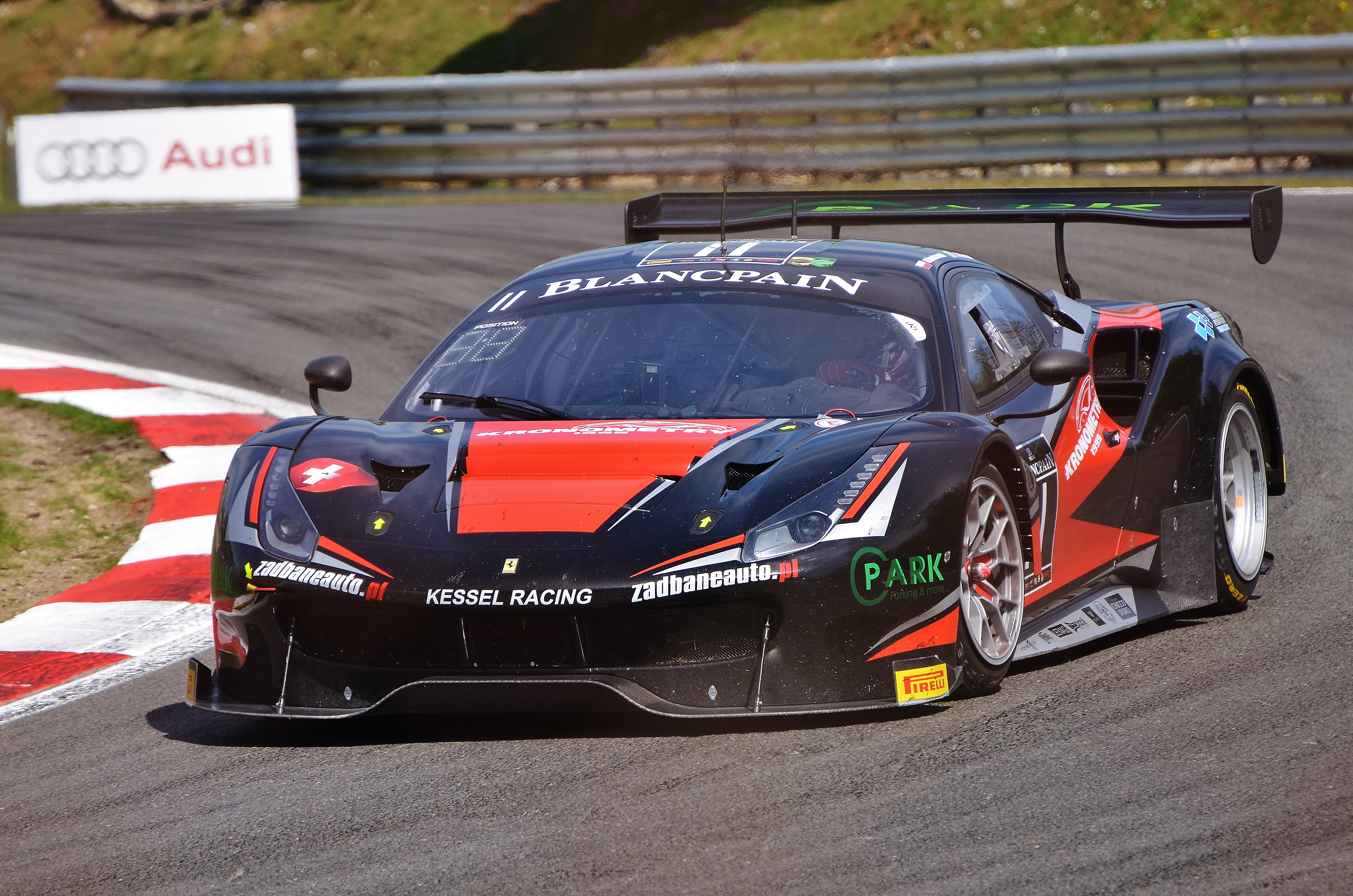
- Piccini in 2016
- Nationality: (Italy) Italian
- Born: 22 March 1985 (age 41) Sansepolcro, Italy
- Relatives: Andrea Piccini (brother)
- Categorisation: FIA Silver (until 2012, 2014, 2016); FIA Gold (2013, 2015, 2017–)

Previous series
- 2002 2011 2006-07,09,11,13 2008-09,12,15 2017 2014,17 2016-18 2009-11,14,19 2018-20: Formula Renault Eurocup; Intercontinental Le Mans Cup; Italian GT Championship International GT Open; Intercontinental GT Challenge; GT World Challenge Europe Endurance Cup; GT World Challenge Europe Sprint Cup; European Le Mans Series; Michelin Le Mans Cup

Championship titles
- 2006 2007 2016 2016 2018 2019: Italian GT Championship - GT3; Italian GT Championship - GT3A; Gulf 12 Hours - Pro; GT World Challenge Europe Sprint Cup - Pro-AM; Michelin Le Mans Cup - GT3; Michelin Le Mans Cup - GT3
- Statistics up to date as of November 24, 2021.

Giacomo Piccini (born 22 March 1985) is an Italian professional racing driver who most recently competed in the Michelin Le Mans Cup for Iron Lynx.

== Team management ==
On 1 July 2021, it was announced that Piccini would head the new joint project between Iron Lynx and Prema Powerteam under DC Racing Solutions.
