= Andrea Piccini =

Italian racing driver and team manager

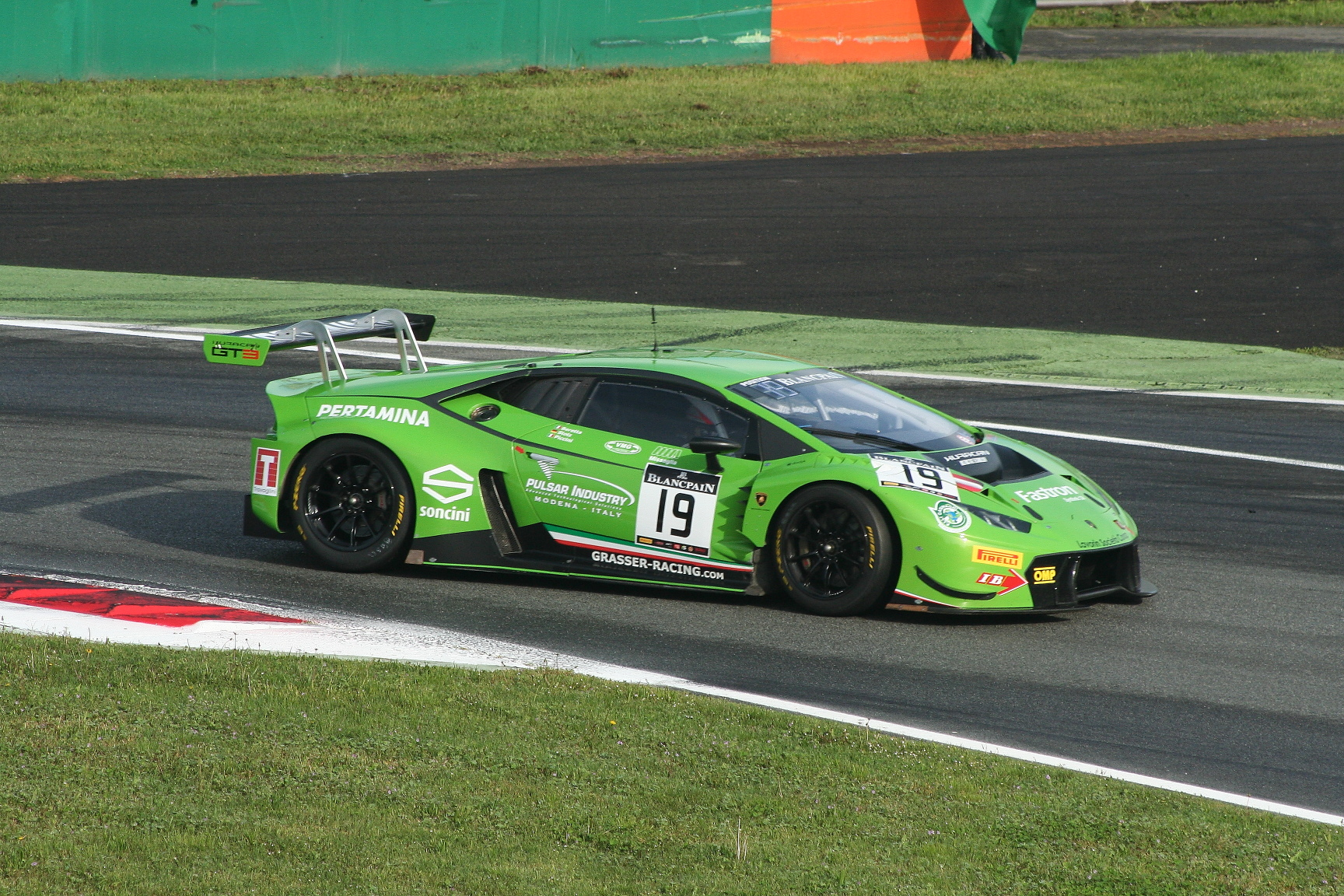
- Nationality: (Italy) Italian
- Born: 12 December 1978 (age 47) Sansepolcro, Italy
- Relatives: Giacomo Piccini (brother)

FIA GT1 World Championship career
- Debut season: 2010
- Current team: Hexis AMR
- Categorisation: FIA Platinum (until 2013); FIA Gold (2014–)
- Car number: 4
- Starts: 9
- Wins: 0
- Poles: 0
- Fastest laps: 0
- Best finish: 25th in 2010

Previous series
- 1999-2001 2002-08 2004, 09-10 2006 2009 2010: International Formula 3000; FIA GT Championship; Le Mans Series; American Le Mans Series; International GT Open; French GT Championship
24 Hours of Le Mans career
- Years: 2006, 2008 - 2009
- Teams: Aston Martin Racing, Racing Box
- Best finish: 6th (2006)
- Class wins: 0

Andrea Piccini (born 12 December 1978 in Sansepolcro) is an Italian racing driver who is the part-owner and team principal and founder of the Iron Lynx Motorsport Lab team.

== Single Seaters ==
Piccini began his single seater career in 1994, when he began competing in go-kart races. In 1997, he started competing in Formula Opel Europe. He finished third in the 1998 standings. He went on to race in International Formula 3000 in 1999 up until 2001, picking up only six points in the three seasons. In 2001, he was signed as a test driver for the European Minardi Formula One.

== Sports Cars ==
After a disappointing single-seater career, Piccini went on to race in sports car racing. In 2002, he was signed by BMS Scuderia Italia to compete in the FIA GT Championship in a Ferrari 550 Maranello. Competing alongside Swiss co-driver Jean-Denis Delétraz, Piccini won four races and finished in fourth place in the championship. For the 2003 season, he moved to Lister Racing, picking up three podiums alongside Delétraz and later Belgian driver David Sterckx.

In 2004 Piccini competed in four rounds for DAMS in their Lamborghini Murciélago R-GT, but failed to score points following a best finish of 12th at Imola. He would return to full-time competition in 2005, driving a Ferrari 575 GTC Evo 2005 for GPC Sport. As was the case in the previous three seasons, including the part-time 2004 campaign, Piccini would share duties with Jean-Denis Delétraz, and the Italian-Swiss driver pairing would finish in tenth place in the GT class with a best result of fourth place at Istanbul Park.

Piccini was signed by Aston Martin Racing in 2006 who wanted to race their new GT1-spec DBR9. He raced two rounds of the American Le Mans Series, scoring in one of those events, being round five. He then went on to compete at the 24 Hours of Le Mans and finished second in the GT1 class with teammates Tomáš Enge and Darren Turner. He reunited with Delétraz again for the 2006 season.They raced for Phoenix Racing who ran a DBR9. Piccini finished third in the championship, taking a win at the final round of the season.

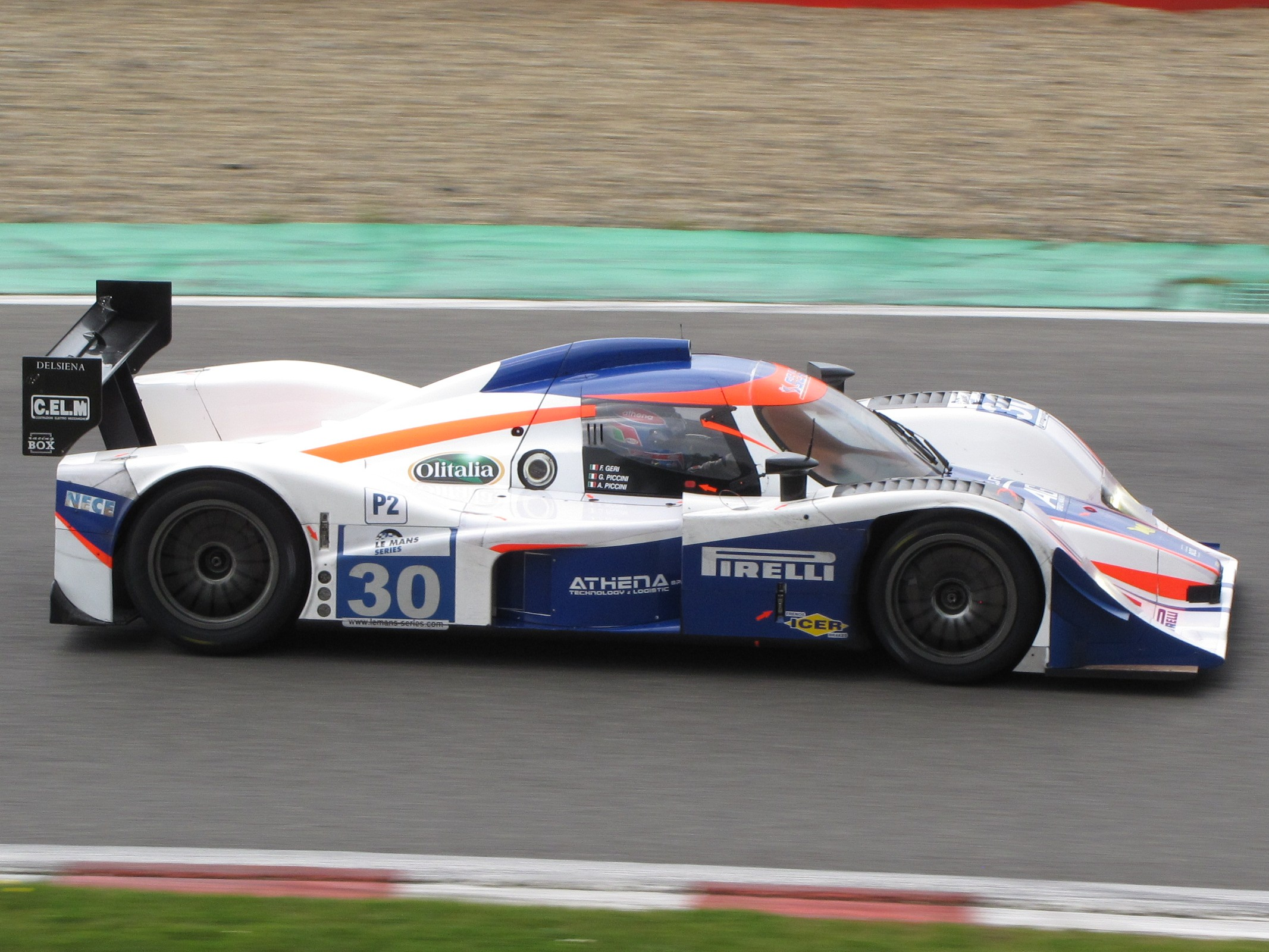
Piccini driving a Lola B08/80-Judd at the 2010 1000 km of Spa

2007 was a slightly quieter year for Piccini, he did not race at Le Mans or in ALMS but did contest the FIA GT, this time for Scuderia Playteam who ran a Maserati MC12 GT1. His teammate was reigning FIA GT co-champion Andrea Bertolini. The pair finished fifth place with only one win during the season. In 2008, Piccini raced six of the ten rounds of the FIA GT Championship, four races in the GT1 class for RBlmmo Racing and two in the GT2 class for CR Scuderia Racing. He did not earn a point for RBlmmo Racing but finished in good points scoring places for CR Scuderia, finishing fourth at the Spa 24 Hours and second place in round eight at Nogaro. He was called upon again by Aston Martin Racing to compete at the years 24 Hours of Le Mans. He managed to finish the No. 007 car fourth place in class with veteran teammates Heinz-Harald Frentzen and Karl Wendlinger.

Piccini moved on from FIA GT and in 2009, he raced for Italian team Racing Box in the Le Mans Series, who ran a LMP2-spec Lola B08/80-Judd. He was joined by fellow Italian compatriots and former FIA GT champions Matteo Bobbi and Thomas Biagi for the season. They picked up a class win in the opening round at Catalunya but the success was short-lived. Piccini finished fifth in the standings. Racing Box then entered the 24 Hours of Le Mans with the same car but retired after 203 laps. 2010 saw Piccini contest only the first two rounds of the Le Mans Series season for Racing Box, before returning to GT racing in the form of the FIA GT1 World Championship. He was reunited with Phoenix Racing who he raced with in FIA GT in 2006, but raced a Chevrolet Corvette C6.R rather than the DBR9. He contested three of the ten rounds, earning an impressive podium finish at the opening round in Abu Dhabi alongside Mike Hezemans. He was behind the wheel of an Aston DBR9 for Hexis AMR for the 2011 FIA GT1 World Championship season.

== Racing record ==
=== Complete International Formula 3000 results ===
(key) (Races in bold indicate pole position) (Races in italics indicate fastest lap)

Year	Entrant	1	2	3	4	5	6	7	8	9	10	11	12	DC	Points
1999	Kid Jensen Racing	IMO; Ret	MON; Ret	CAT; DNQ	MAG; 13	SIL; 8	A1R; 5	HOC; DNQ	HUN; Ret	SPA; DNQ	NUR; DNQ			19th	2
2000	Kid Jensen Racing	IMO; Ret	SIL; DNQ	CAT; 11	NUR; 9	MON; Ret	MAG; 12	A1R; Ret	HOC; 4	HUN; 16	SPA; 13			20th	3
2001	European Minardi F3000	INT; 11	IMO; Ret	CAT; 13	A1R; 6	MON; Ret	NÜR; 9	MAG; Ret	SIL; Ret	HOC; Ret	HUN; 8	SPA; Ret	MNZ; 8	18th	1

=== Complete 24 Hours of Le Mans results ===
Year	Team	Co-Drivers	Car	Class	Laps	Pos.	Class Pos.
2006	(United Kingdom) Aston Martin Racing	(Czech Republic) Tomáš Enge (United Kingdom) Darren Turner	Aston Martin DBR9	GT1	350	6th	**2nd**
2008	(United Kingdom) Aston Martin Racing	(Germany) Heinz-Harald Frentzen (Austria) Karl Wendlinger	Aston Martin DBR9	GT1	339	16th	4th
2009	(Italy) Racing Box	(Italy) Thomas Biagi (Italy) Matteo Bobbi	Lola B08/80-Judd	LMP2	203	DNF	DNF
2019	(Switzerland) Kessel Racing	(Italy) Claudio Schiavoni (Italy) Sergio Pianezzolla	Ferrari 488 GTE	GTE; Am	324	46th	13th
2020	(Italy) Iron Lynx	(Italy) Rino Mastronardi (Italy) Matteo Cressoni	Ferrari 488 GTE Evo	GTE; Am	211	DNF	DNF

=== Complete GT1 World Championship results ===
Year	Team	Car	1	2	3	4	5	6	7	8	9	10	11	12	13	14	15	16	17	18	19	20	Pos	Points
2010	Phoenix Racing / Carsport	Corvette	ABU; QR; 16	ABU; CR; 3	SIL; QR	SIL; CR	BRN; QR	BRN; CR	PRI; QR; 6	PRI; CR; 5	SPA; QR; Ret	SPA; CR; Ret	NÜR; QR	NÜR; CR	ALG; QR	ALG; CR	NAV; QR	NAV; CR	INT; QR	NT; CR	SAN; QR	SAN; CR	25th	25
2011	Hexis AMR	Aston Martin	ABU; QR; 9	ABU; CR; 4	ZOL; QR; 10	ZOL; CR; 2	ALG; QR; 11	ALG; CR; 8	SAC; QR; 5	SAC; CR; 1	SIL; QR; 10	SIL; CR; Ret	NAV; QR; 5	NAV; CR; 5	PRI; QR; 6	PRI; CR; 5	ORD; QR; 8	ORD; CR; 4	BEI; QR; 3	BEI; CR; 10	SAN; QR; 14	SAN; CR; 5	**3rd**	**111**
