= Ferrari 458 =

Italian mid-engine sports car by Ferrari

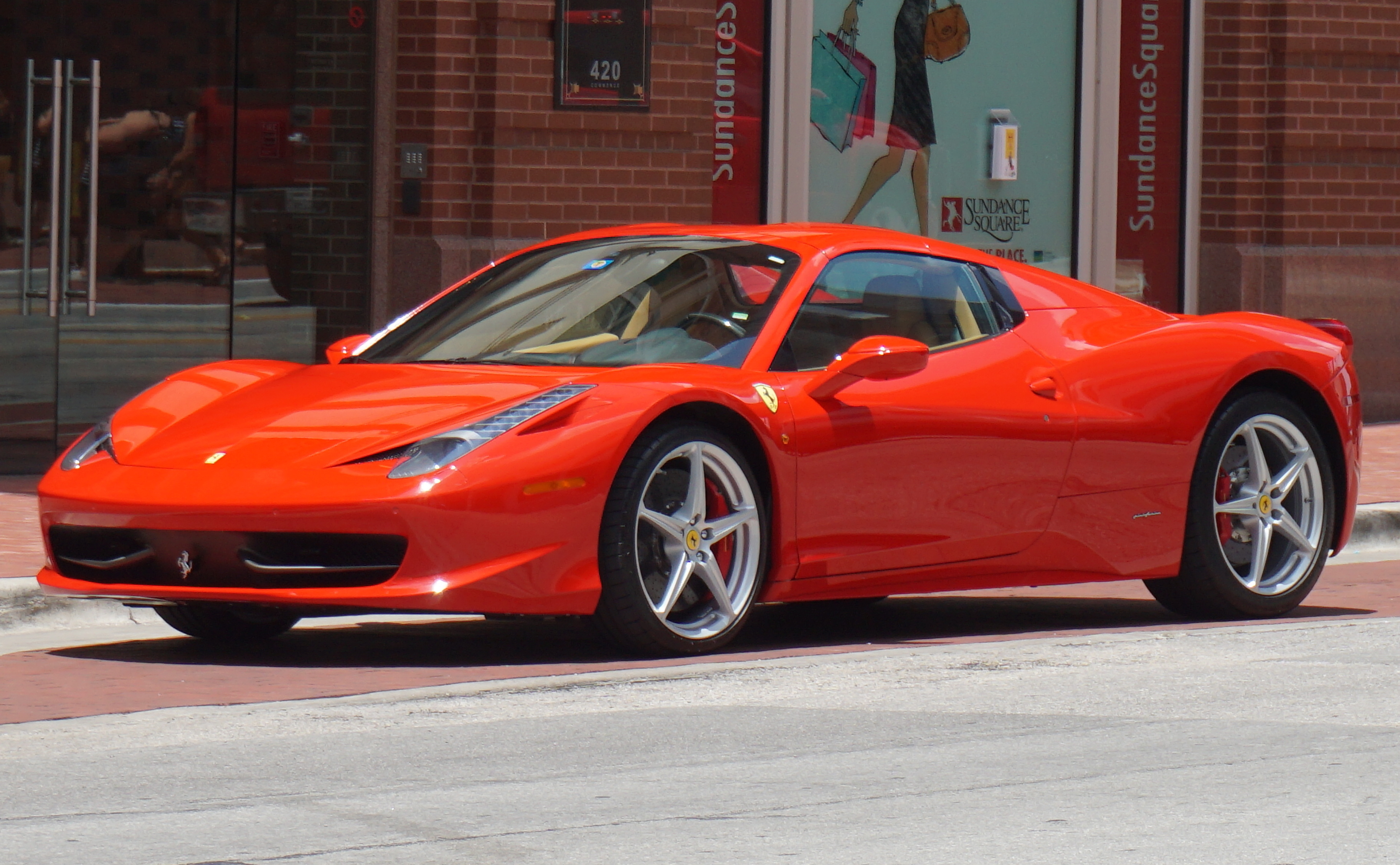

Overview
- Manufacturer: Ferrari
- Also called: Ferrari 458 Italia; Ferrari 458 Speciale; Ferrari 458 Spider
- Production: 2009–2015
- Assembly: Italy: Maranello
- Designer: Donato Coco at Ferrari Styling Centre in collaboration with Pininfarina

Body and chassis
- Class: Sports car (S)
- Body style: 2-door berlinetta; 2-door retractable hard-top convertible
- Layout: Rear mid-engine, rear-wheel-drive

Powertrain
- Engine: 4.5 L Ferrari F136 F V8
- Power output: 458 Italia & Spider: 570 PS (419 kW; 562 hp); 458 Speciale, A: 605 PS (445 kW; 597 hp)
- Transmission: 7-speed Getrag 7DCL750 dual-clutch automatic

Dimensions
- Wheelbase: 2,650 mm (104.3 in)
- Length: 4,527 mm (178.2 in)
- Width: 1,937 mm (76.3 in)
- Height: 1,213 mm (47.8 in)
- Curb weight: 1,565 kg (3,450 lb)

Chronology
- Predecessor: Ferrari F430
- Successor: Ferrari 488

Ferrari 458 Italia at Goodwood Festival of Speed 2010

The Ferrari 458 Italia (Type F142) is an Italian mid-engine sports car that was produced by Ferrari from 2009 to 2015. The 458 is the successor of the F430, and was first officially unveiled at the 2009 Frankfurt Motor Show. It was succeeded by the 488 GTB (Gran Turismo Berlinetta) in 2015.

== Specifications ==
In Ferrari's first official announcement of the car, the 458 was described as the successor to the F430 but arising from an entirely new design, incorporating technologies developed from the company's experience in Formula One.

The body computer system was developed by Magneti Marelli.

=== Engine ===
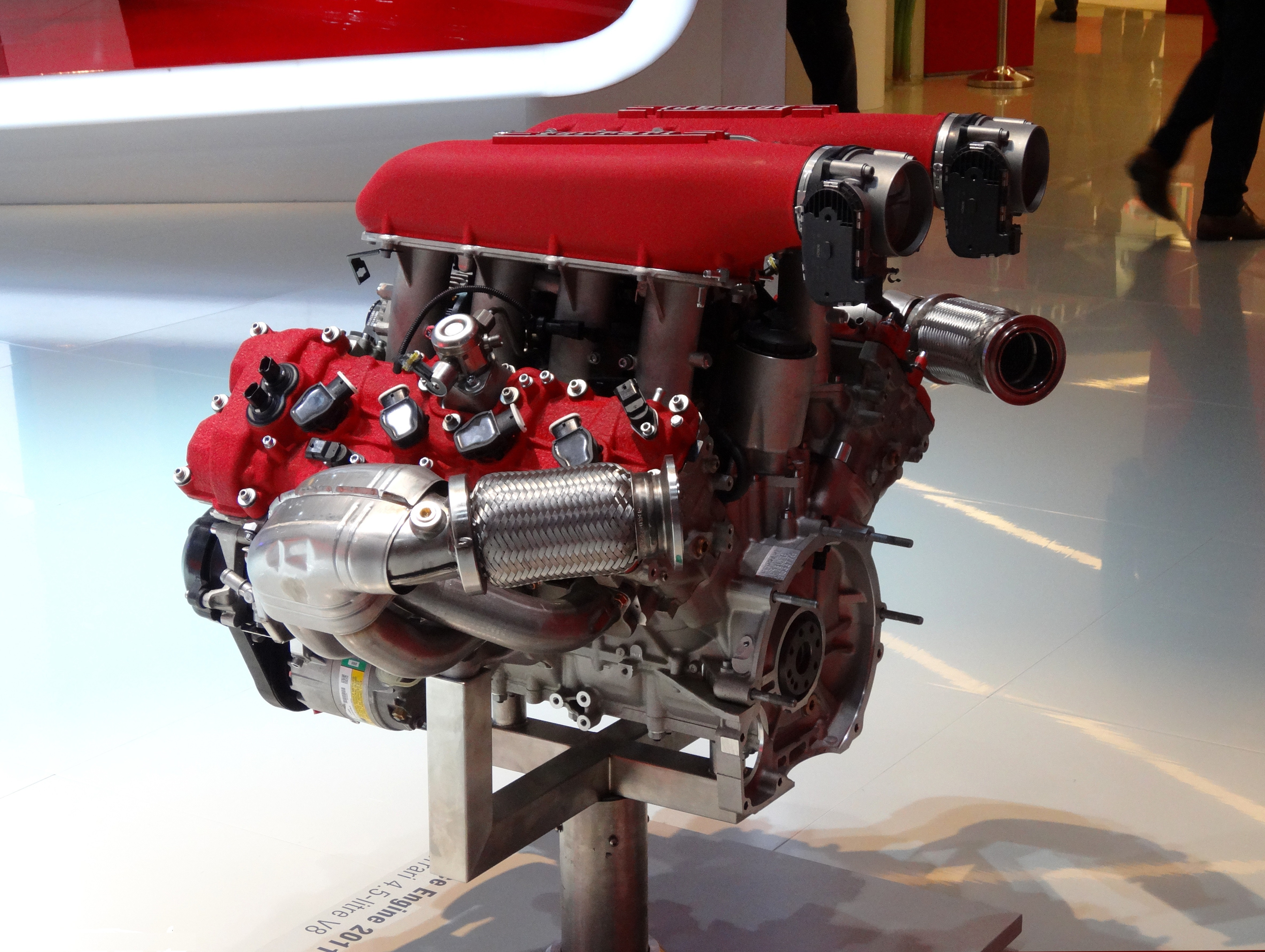
The F136 V8 engine used in the 458

The 458 is powered by a 4,497 cc (4.5 L; 274.4 cu in) engine of the "Ferrari/Maserati" F136 V8 family, generating a power output of 570 PS (419 kW; 562 hp) at 9,000 rpm (redline) and 540 N⋅m (398 lb⋅ft) of torque at 6,000 rpm with 80 percent of torque available at 3,250 rpm. The engine features direct fuel injection, a first for Ferrari mid-engine setups in its road cars.

=== Transmission ===
The only transmission available on the 458 is a 7-speed dual-clutch automatic gearbox by Getrag, in a different state of tune shared with the Mercedes-Benz SLS AMG. There is no traditional manual option, making this the first mainstream model to not be offered with a manual transmission.

Gear	1	2	3	4	5	6	7	Final Drive
Ratio	3.08	2.18	1.63	1.29	1.03	0.84	0.69	5.14

=== Handling ===
The car's suspension has double wishbones at the front and a multi-link setup at the rear, coupled with E-Diff and F1-Trac traction control systems, designed to improve the car's cornering and longitudinal acceleration by 32% when compared with its predecessors. The steering ratio is 11.5:1.

The brakes include a prefill function whereby the pistons in the calipers move the pads into contact with the discs on lift off to minimize delay in the brakes being applied. This, combined with the ABS and standard Carbon Ceramic brakes, have caused a reduction in stopping distance from 100–0 km/h (62–0 mph) to 32.5 metres (107 ft). Tests have shown the car will stop from 100 km/h (62 mph) in 90 feet (27 m) or in 85 feet (26 m) with run flat tires, 85 feet (26 m) from 60 mph (97 km/h) and 80 feet (24 m) from 60 mph (97 km/h) with run flat tires.

The adaptive magnetorheological dampers were co-developed with BWI Group.

=== Performance ===
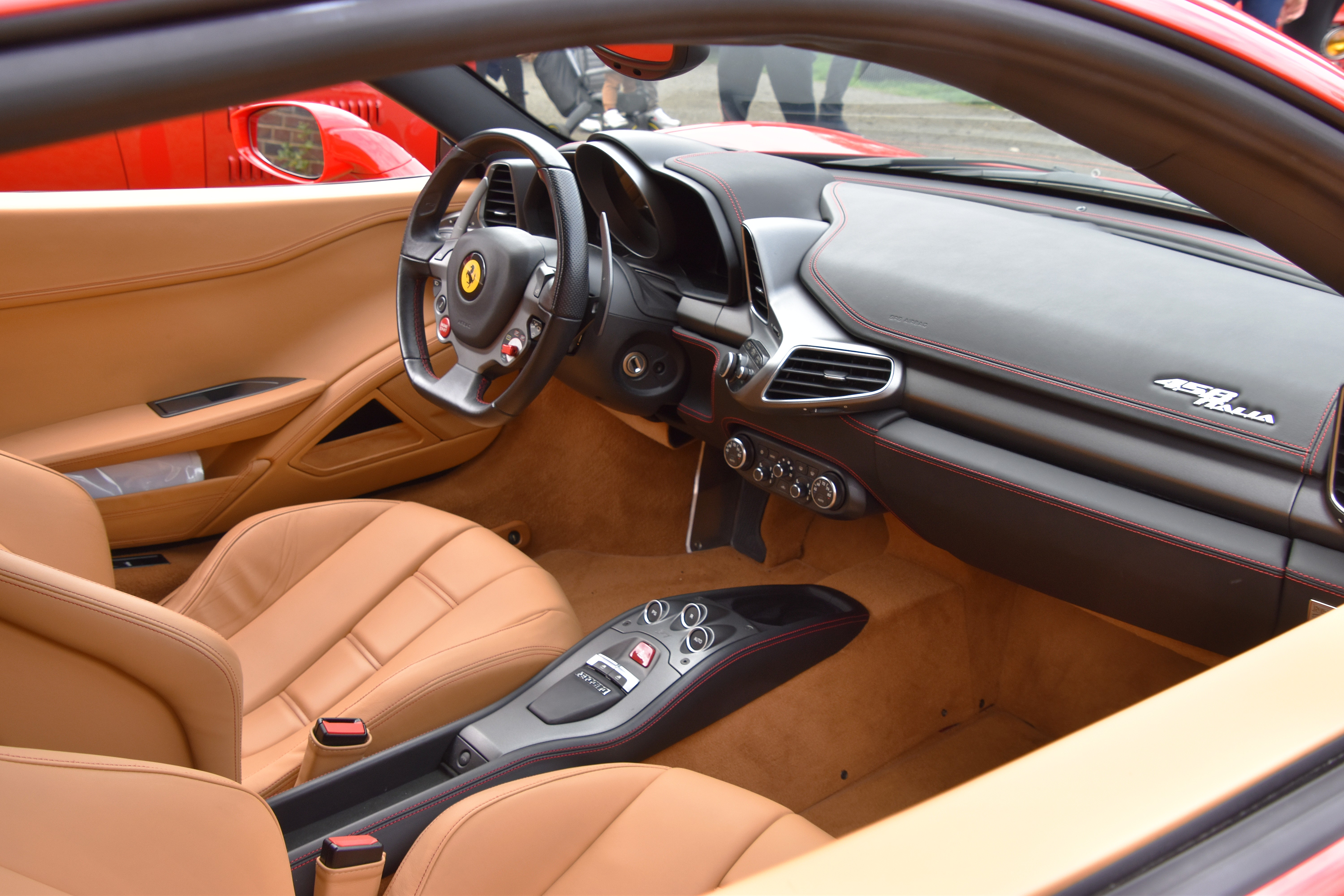
Interior

Ferrari's official 0–100 km/h (0–62 mph) acceleration is 3.4 seconds. The top speed is over 325 km/h (202 mph). It has fuel consumption in combined cycle (ECE+EUDC) of 13.3 L/100 km (21.2 mpg_{‑imp}; 17.7 mpg_{‑US}) while producing 307 g/km of CO_{2}.

== Design ==
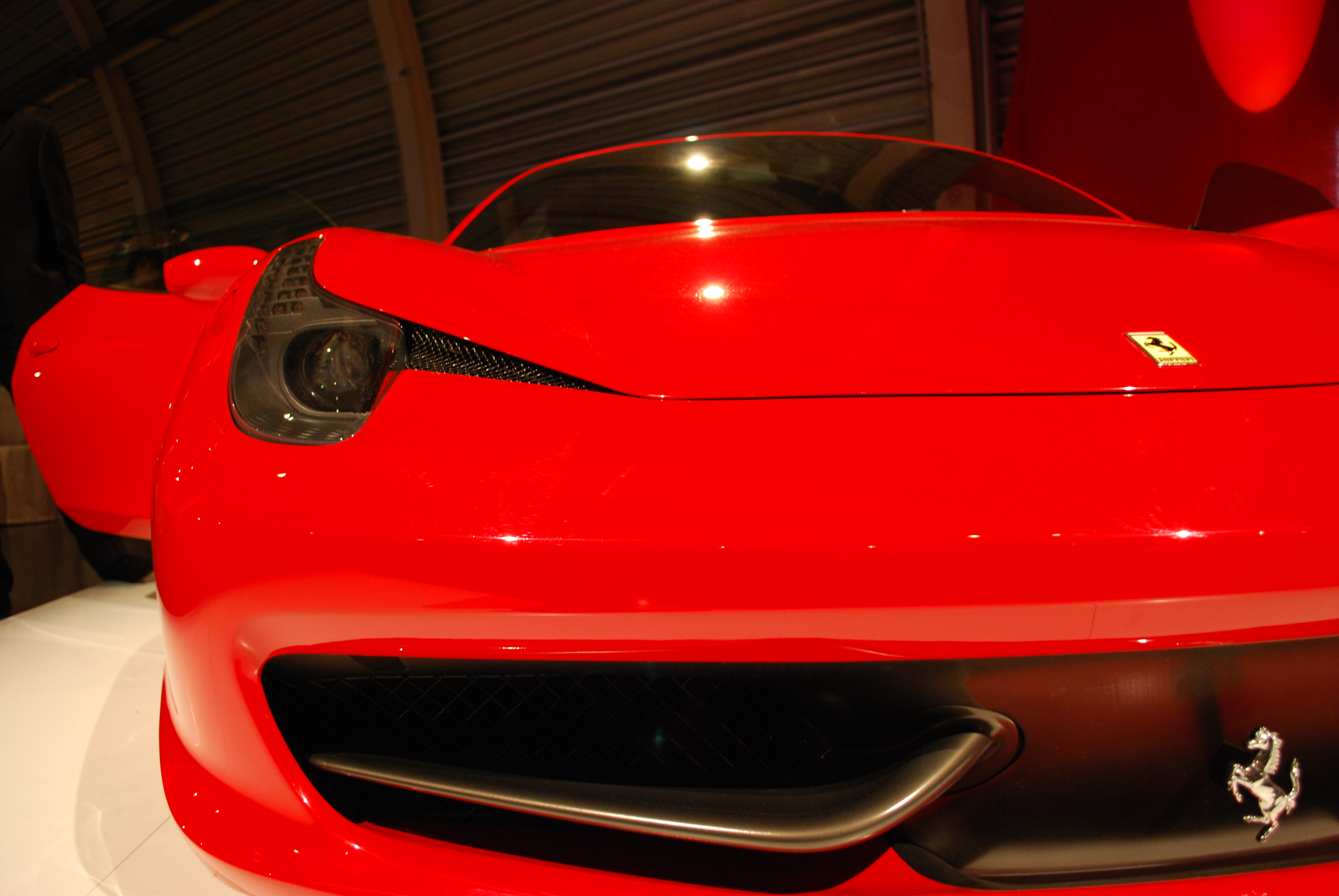
The small aeroelastic winglets generate downforce and, as speed rises, deform to reduce the section of the radiator intake and cut drag.

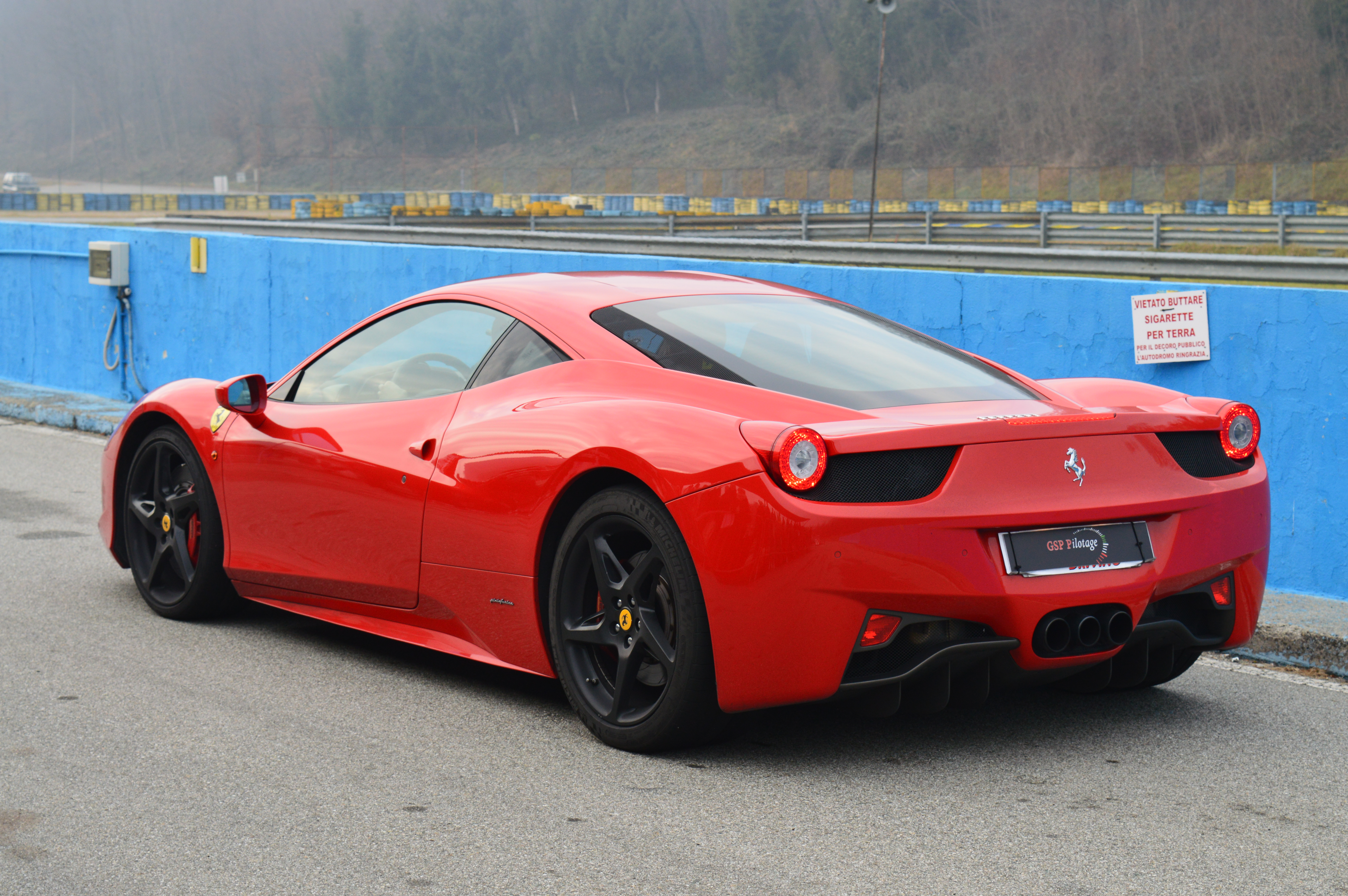
Rear view

In keeping with Ferrari tradition, the body was designed by Pininfarina under the leadership of Donato Coco, the Ferrari design director during 2009.

The interior design of the Ferrari 458 Italia was done by Bertrand Rapatel (Director of Ferrari Interior Design), a French automobile designer.

The car's exterior styling and features were designed for aerodynamic efficiency, producing downforce of 140 kg (309 lb) at 200 km/h (124 mph). In particular, the front grille features deformable winglets that lower at high speeds, in order to offer reduced drag. The car's interior was designed using input from former Ferrari Formula 1 driver Michael Schumacher; in a layout common to racing cars, the new steering wheel incorporates many controls normally located on the dashboard or on stalks, such as turning signals or high beams.

According to British car magazine Autocar, the 458 Italia's design has drawn inspiration from the Enzo Ferrari and its Millechili concept car. It has been designed to be Ferrari's sportiest V8-engined car, to distinguish itself from the entry level California.

== Variants ==
=== 458 Spider (2011–2015) ===
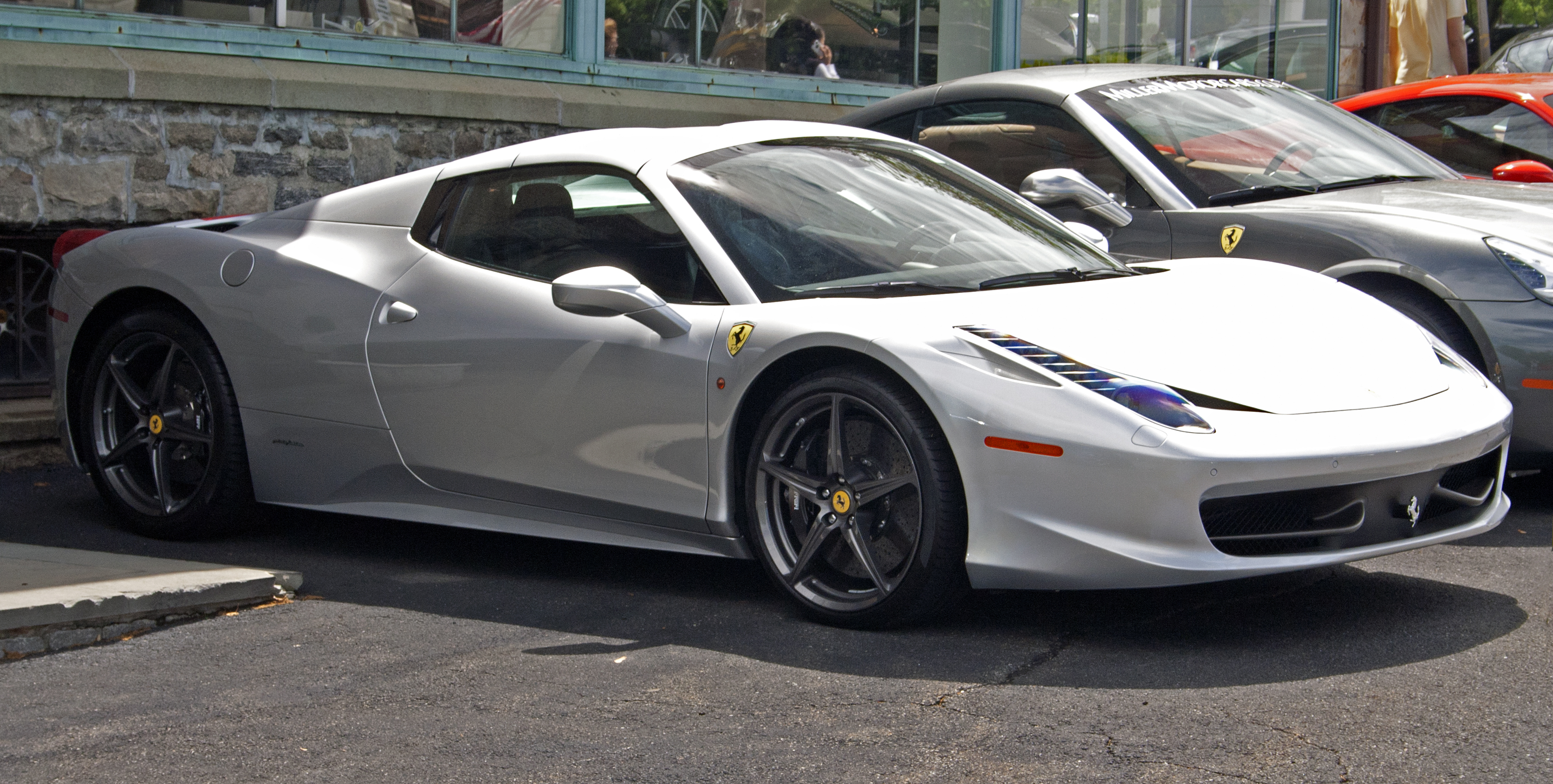

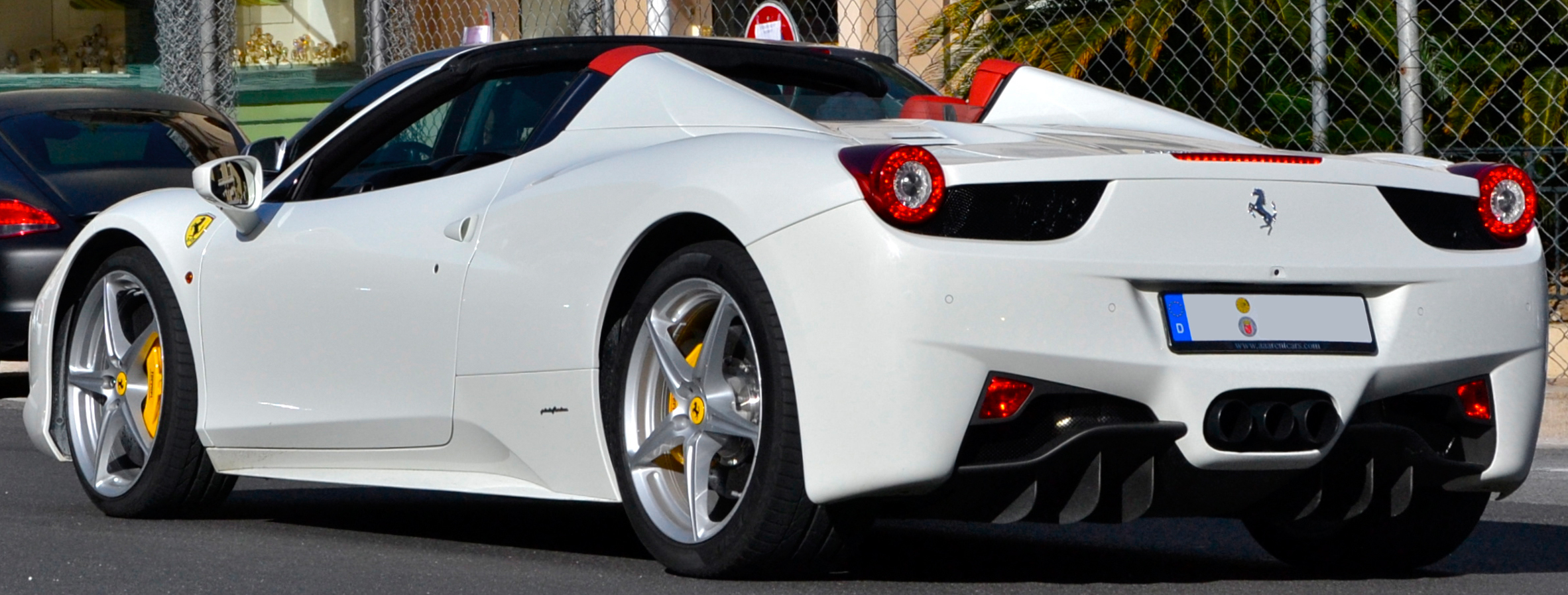
Ferrari 458 Spider

The 458 Spider was introduced at the 2011 Frankfurt Motor Show. This convertible variant of the 458 Italia features an aluminium retractable hardtop which, according to Ferrari, weighs 25 kilograms (55 lb) less than a soft roof such as the one found on the Ferrari F430 Spider, and requires 14 seconds for operation. The engine cover has been redesigned to accommodate the retractable roof system. It has the same 0–100 km/h (0–62 mph) acceleration time as the coupé but has a lower top speed of 320 km/h (200 mph).

=== 458 Speciale (2013–2015) ===
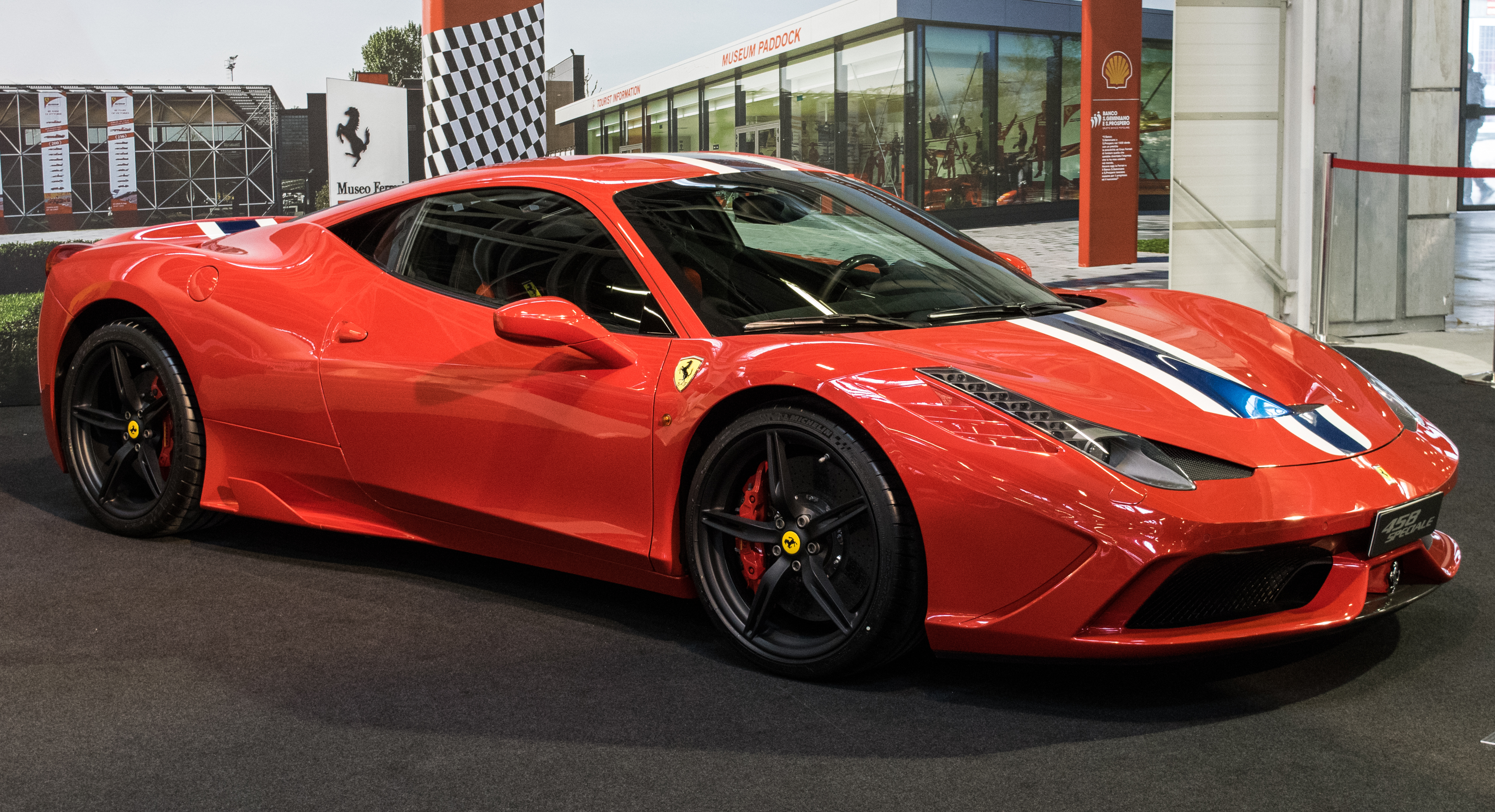

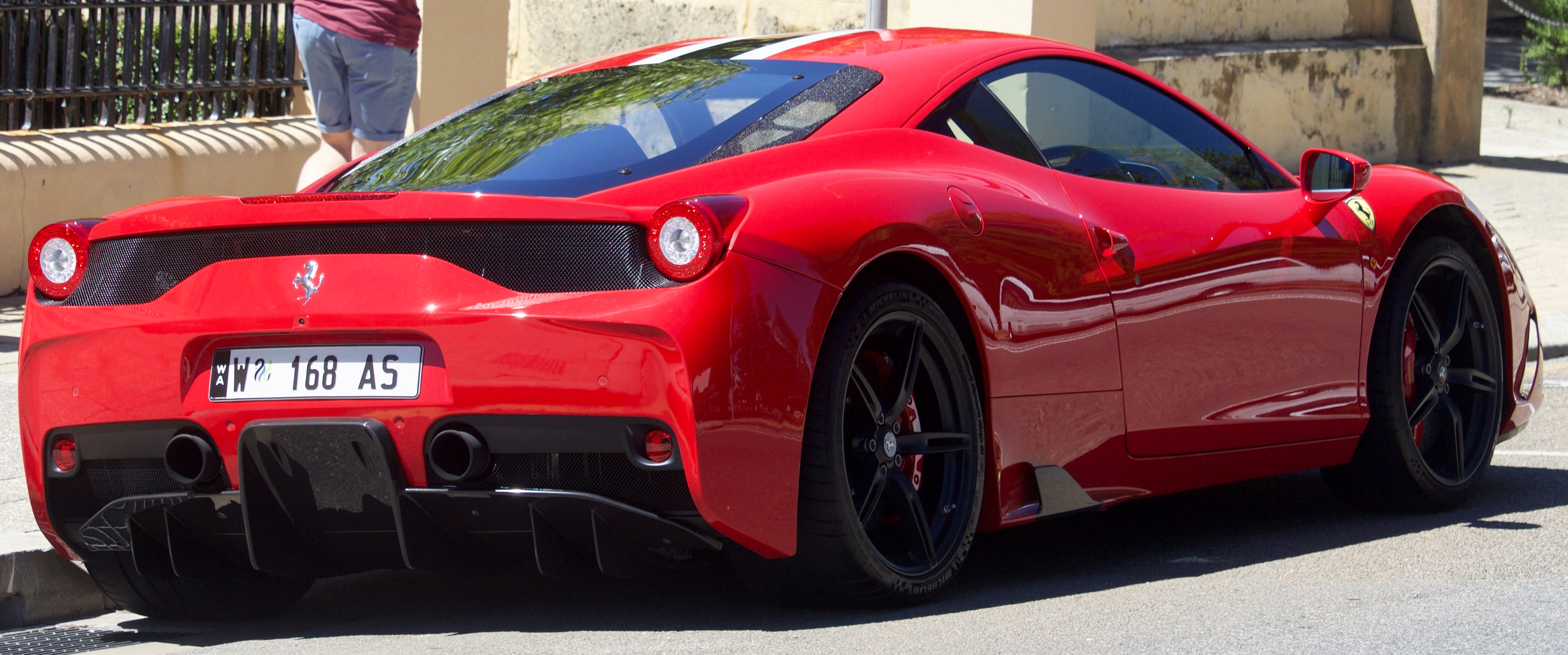
Ferrari 458 Speciale

The 458 Speciale was unveiled in 2013 at the Frankfurt Motor Show as the high performance variant of the 458 Italia. Distinctions of the Speciale over the standard 458 Italia are the forged wheels, vented bonnet, finned side sills, a taller rear spoiler and redesigned bumpers, which include active aerodynamics designed by Ferrari Styling Centre in cooperation with Pininfarina; front and rear movable flaps balance downforce and cut drag at speed.

The engine was revised, with power increased to 605 PS (445 kW; 597 hp) at 9,000 rpm and 540 N⋅m (398 lb⋅ft) of torque at 6,000 rpm. Electronic systems were updated too and side slip angle control (SSC) was introduced to improve car control on the limit. SSC performs instant-to-instant analysis of the car's side-slip, comparing it with the target value and then optimising both torque management (via integration with F1-Trac traction control) and torque distribution between the two wheels (via integration with the E-Diff electronic differential).

The Speciale accelerates from 0 to 100 km/h (62 mph) in 3.0 seconds, 0–200 km/h (120 mph) in 9.1 seconds. Ferrari declared a Fiorano test track lap time of 1:23.5, only 0.5 seconds slower than the F12 berlinetta. Lateral acceleration now reaches 1.33 g. Only 1,309 were made.

=== 458 Speciale A (2014–2015) ===
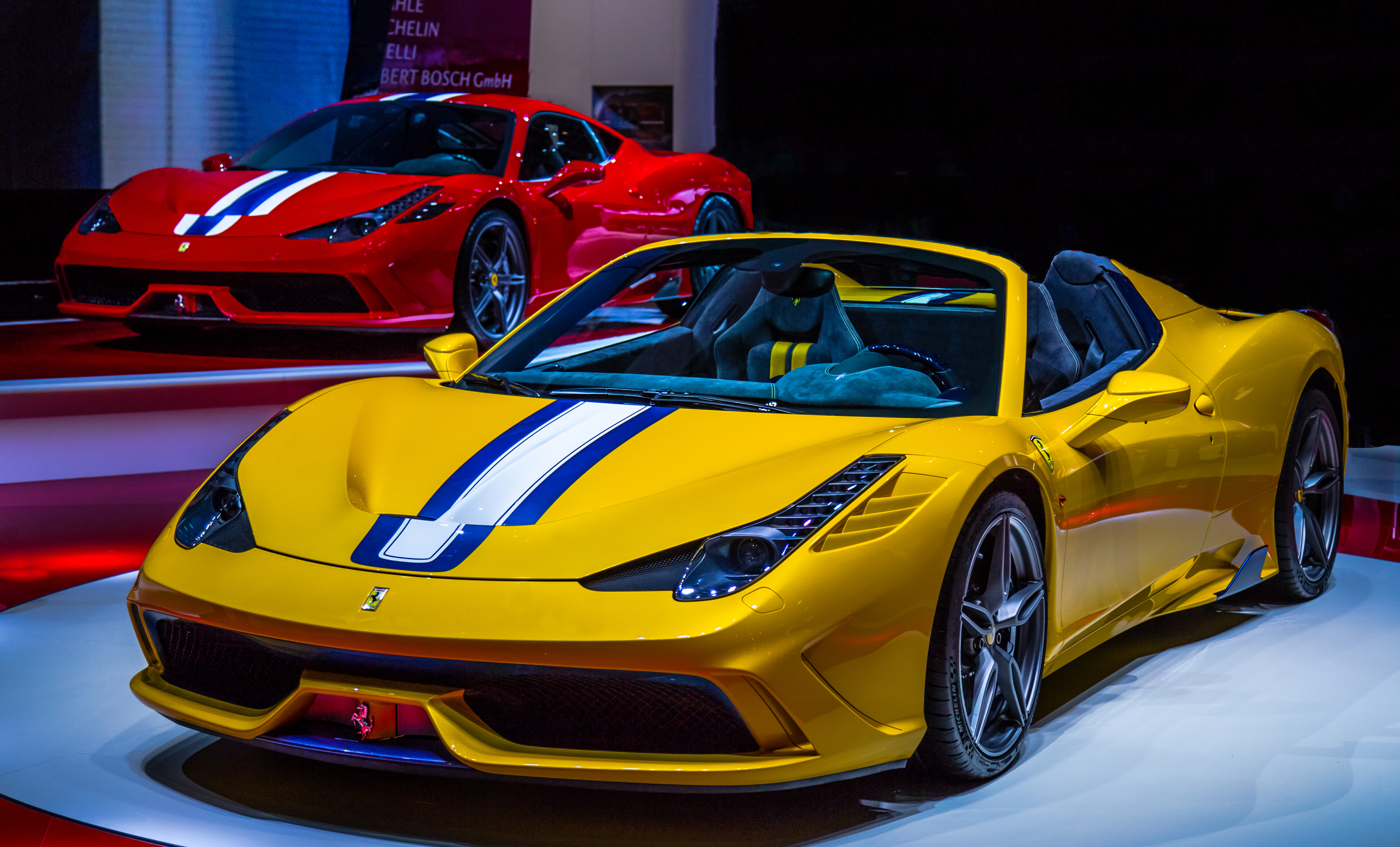
Ferrari 458 Speciale A

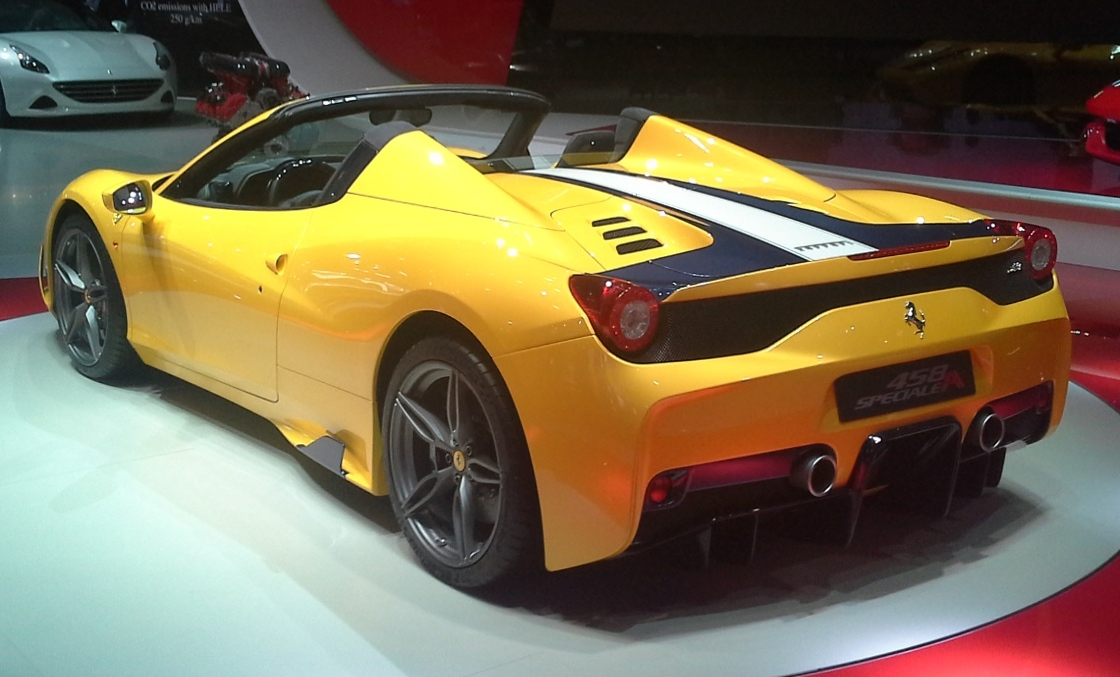

The 458 Speciale A is the convertible variant of the 458 Speciale which was unveiled at the 2014 Paris Motor Show. The 'A' stands for 'Aperta', which is Italian for 'open' – and the model was limited to only 499 examples (49 RHD examples). Just like the Speciale coupé, the Aperta has a 4.5-litre naturally aspirated V8 engine which generates a power output of 605 PS (445 kW; 597 hp) and 398 lb⋅ft (540 N⋅m) of torque. Acceleration from 0–100 km/h (0–62 mph) takes 3.0 seconds, and the Spider is capable of a top speed of 320 km/h (199 mph). It was the most powerful street-legal, naturally aspirated Ferrari automobile the company had ever launched in a convertible variant, until it was surpassed by the 790 hp (801 PS; 589 kW) naturally aspirated V12 of the LaFerrari Aperta in 2017.

== Special edition ==
=== 458 Italia China Edition (2012) ===
The 2012 458 Italia China Edition is a limited (20 units) version of the 458 Italia for the Chinese market, built to commemorate the 20th anniversary of Ferrari in China since the first Ferrari, a 348 TS, was ordered in Beijing. It is distinguished by its Marco Polo Red body colour, golden dragon graphic on the front bonnet, gold and black livery stripes symbolising a racing track, gold painted wheels, gold aeroelastic winglets, gold embroidery on the car's head rests, engine start button inscribed with the simplified Chinese characters for 'start' and a '20th Anniversary Special Edition' plaque on the dash.

The vehicle was unveiled at the Italia Center of Shanghai World Expo Park.

== One-offs ==
=== SP12 EC (2012) ===
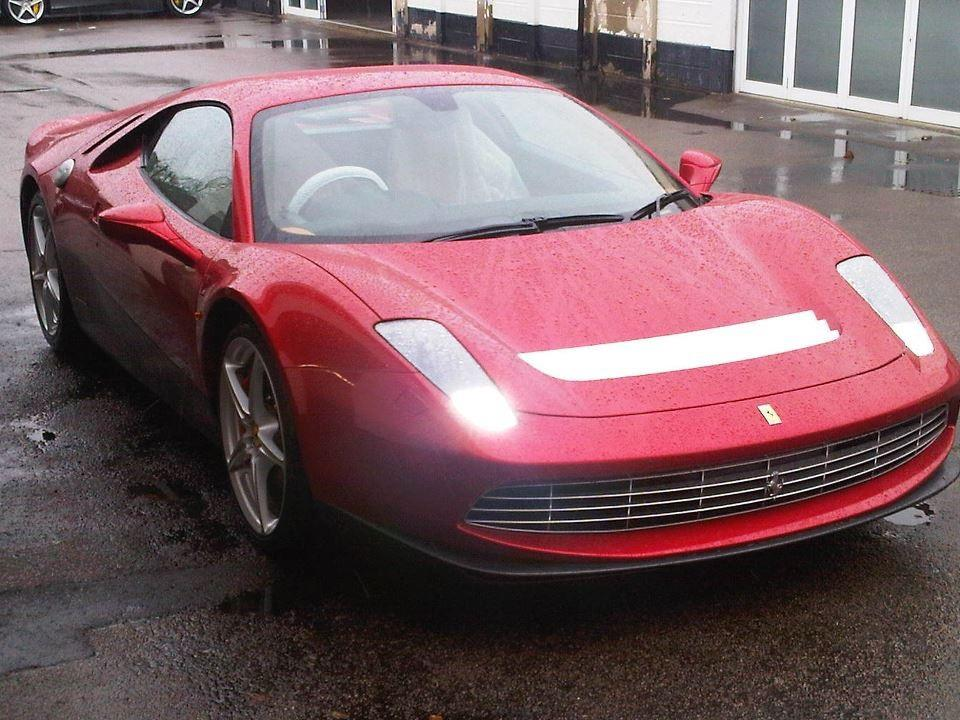
Ferrari SP12 EC

The Ferrari SP12 EC is a one-off sports car built by Ferrari for English musician Eric Clapton under Ferrari's Special Projects programme, and based on the 458 Italia. It was revealed in May 2012 and shown at the 2013 Goodwood Festival of Speed. The bespoke SP12 EC's bodywork is inspired by that of the Ferrari 512 BB, and was designed by Ferrari Styling Centre in collaboration with Pininfarina. It uses the mechanicals of the 458 Italia, including its 4.5-litre V8 engine and seven-speed dual-clutch transmission, although many of the car's technical details are considered confidential. The car reportedly cost £3,000,000.

=== Pininfarina Sergio (2013) ===
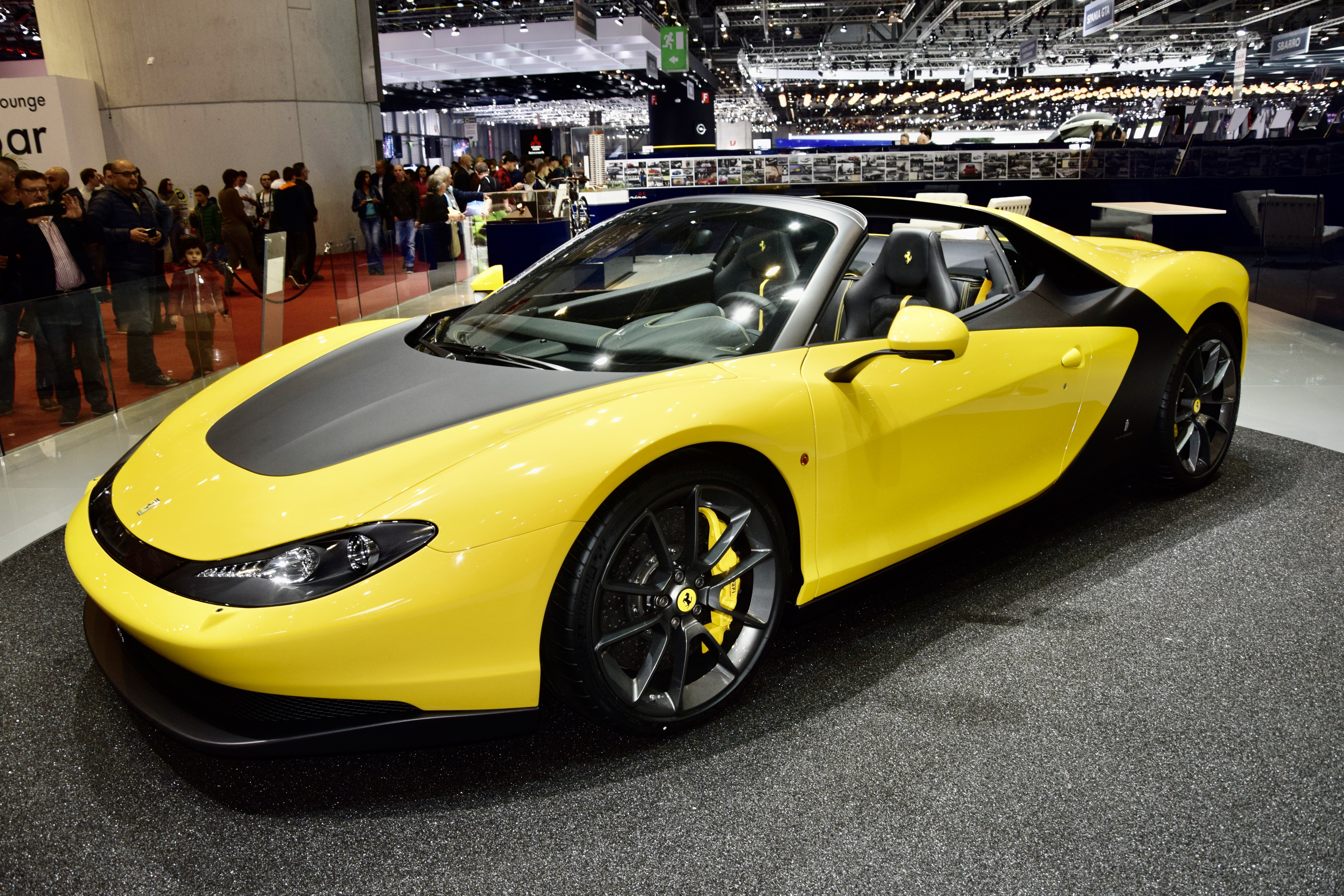
Ferrari Sergio at the 2015 Geneva Motor Show

The Pininfarina Sergio concept car, named in memory of long standing chairman Sergio Pininfarina, is a modern interpretation of the 2-seater barchetta built upon the 458 Spider's mechanicals. In keeping with the traditional open barchetta body style, it has no windshield; two matching helmets are provided for the driver and passenger.

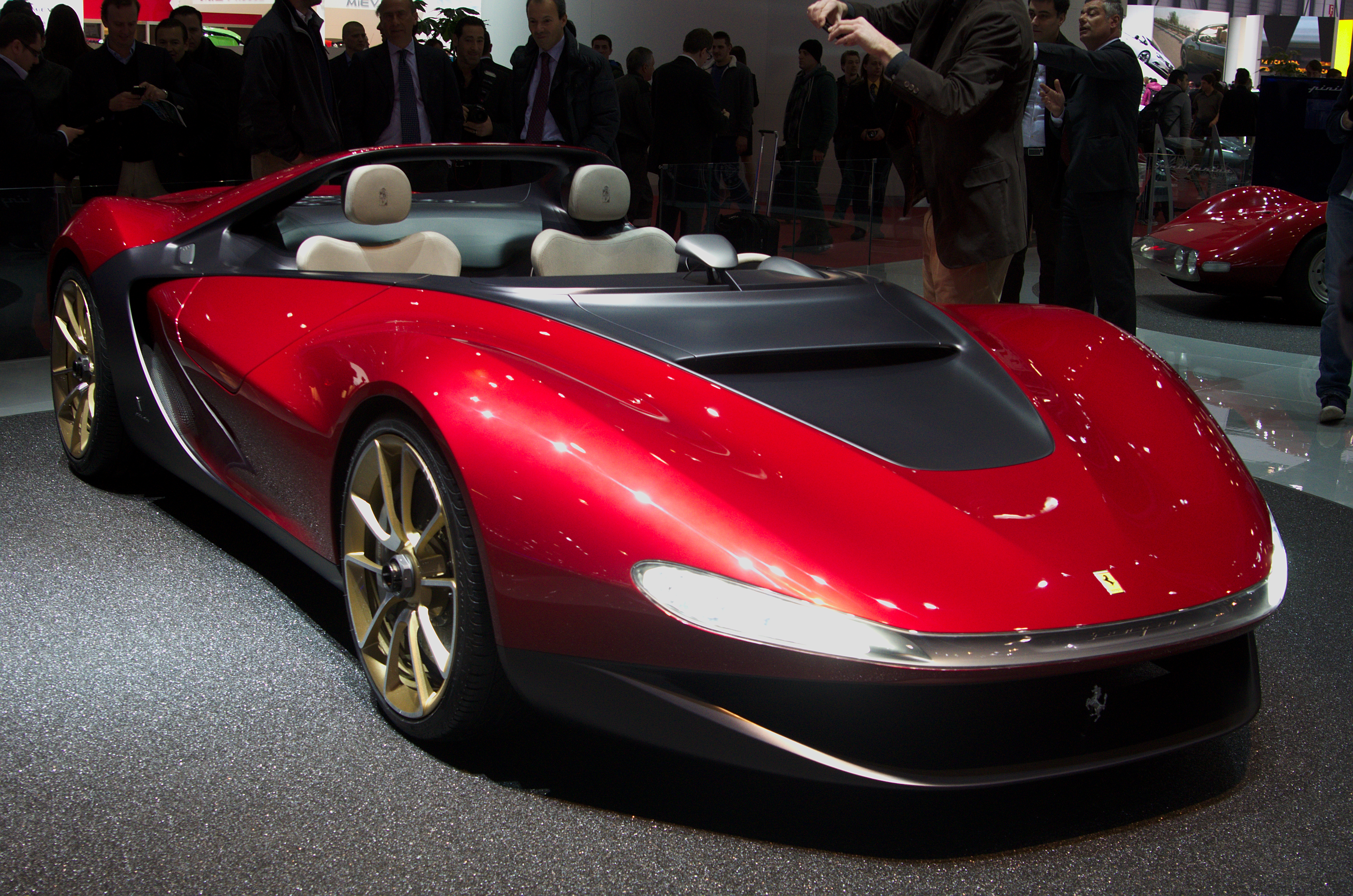
Pininfarina Sergio concept at the 2013 Geneva Motor Show

The car was first shown in March 2013 at the Geneva Motor Show. According to Pininfarina, the Sergio was developed like a production car, and therefore it could be produced in limited numbers.

Ferrari built six units of the Ferrari Sergio in collaboration with Pininfarina in 2015 and sold it to handpicked customers. The production version incorporates a targa top body style due to complexities and high production costs arising in producing the original design of the car. They use the engine of the 458 Speciale and each unit reportedly cost US$3,000,000.

The yellow and matte black car shown at the 2015 Geneva Motor Show was delivered new to its first owner in Switzerland. Its VIN is ZFF75VHB000205529 and it was offered at RM Sotheby's Monaco auction in May 2018. The car had 200 km (120 mi) from new and an estimate of €2,500,000 - €3,000,000. The car sold for an unknown amount.

A silver (Argento Nürburgring) and matte black car was offered for sale at Gooding and Co's 2019 Pebble Beach auction with 78 miles from new and an estimate of $2,500,000 - $3,000,000. The car's VIN is ZFF75VFA5E0205934 and it was delivered new to a European racing driver. It didn't sell then.

=== 458 MM Speciale (2016) ===
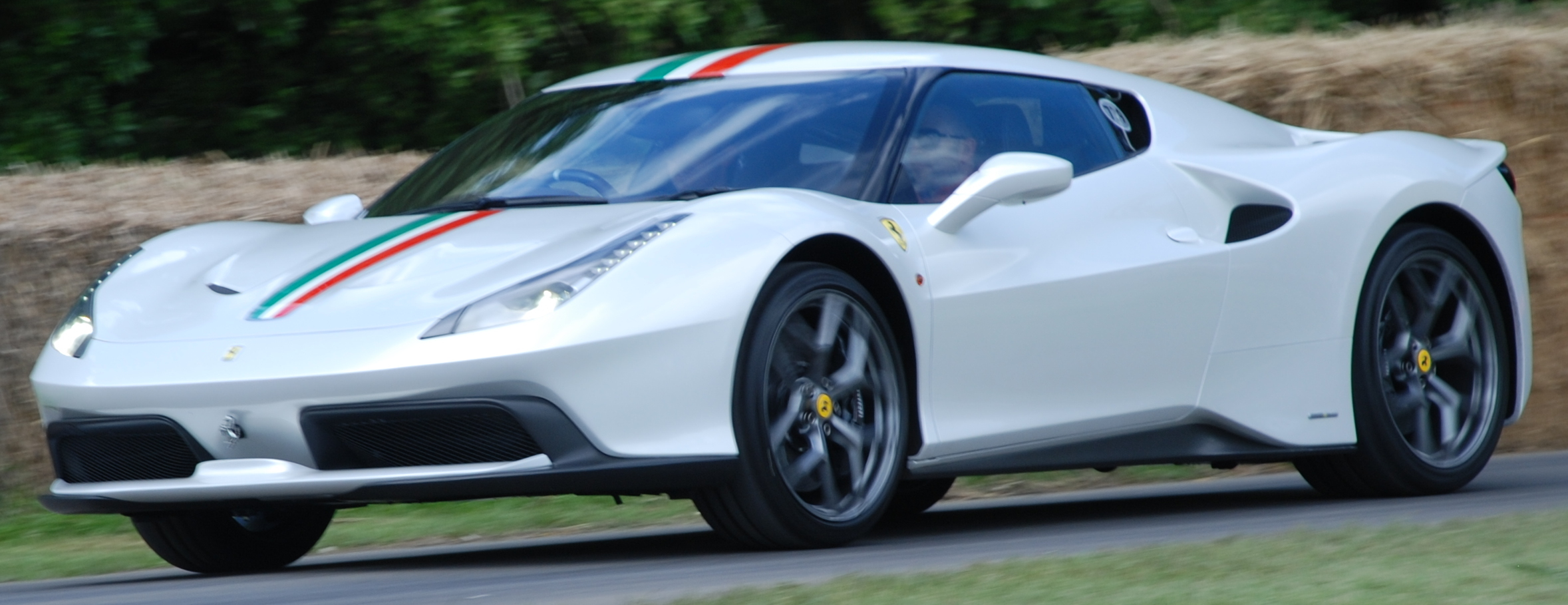
Ferrari 458 MM Speciale at the Goodwood Festival of Speed 2016

The 458 Speciale MM is a one-off sports car based on a Ferrari 458 Speciale and built for a British customer. The design pays homage to the Ferrari 288 GTO and incorporates handcrafted aluminium and carbon fibre components.

== Racing ==
=== 458 Challenge ===
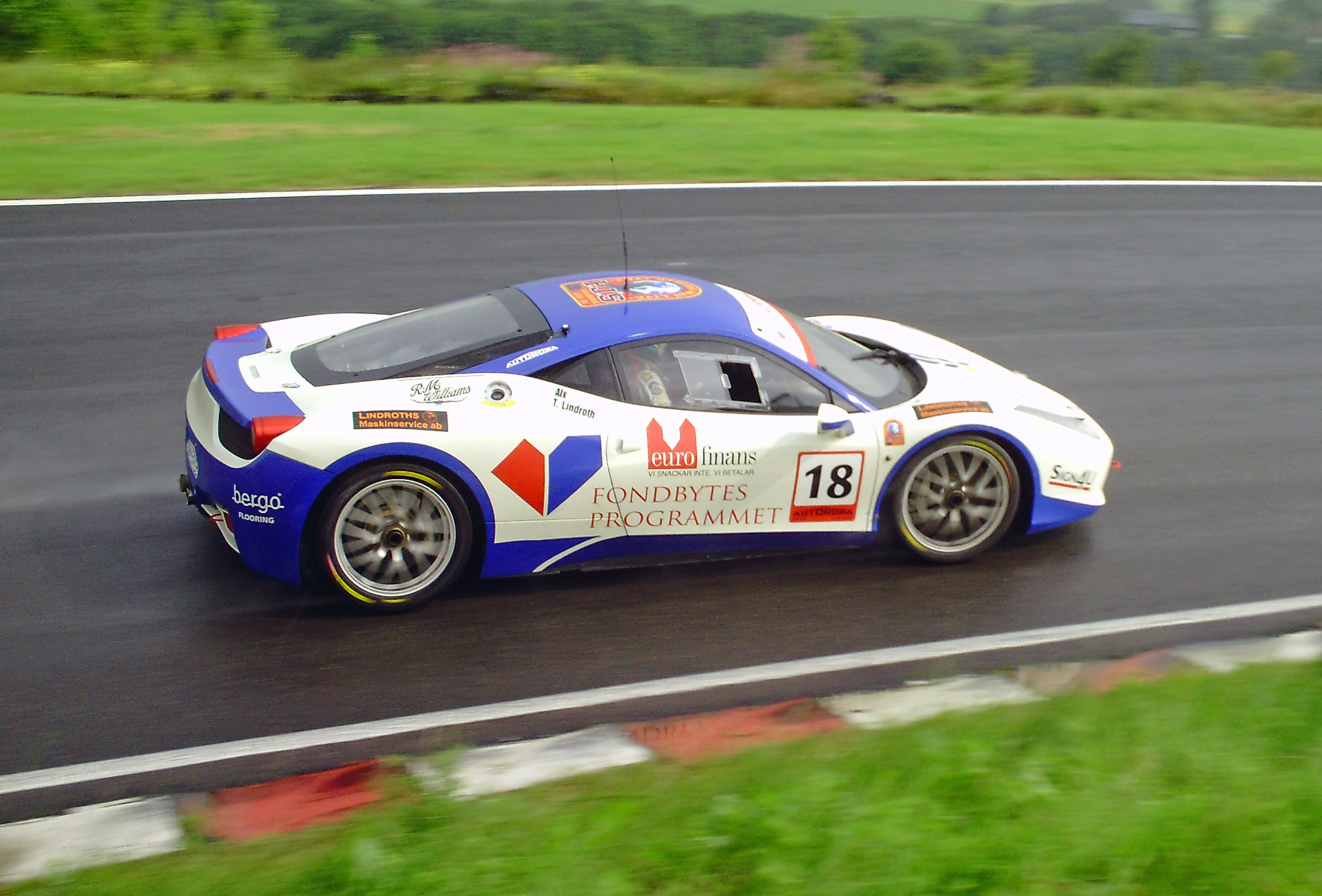
458 Challenge

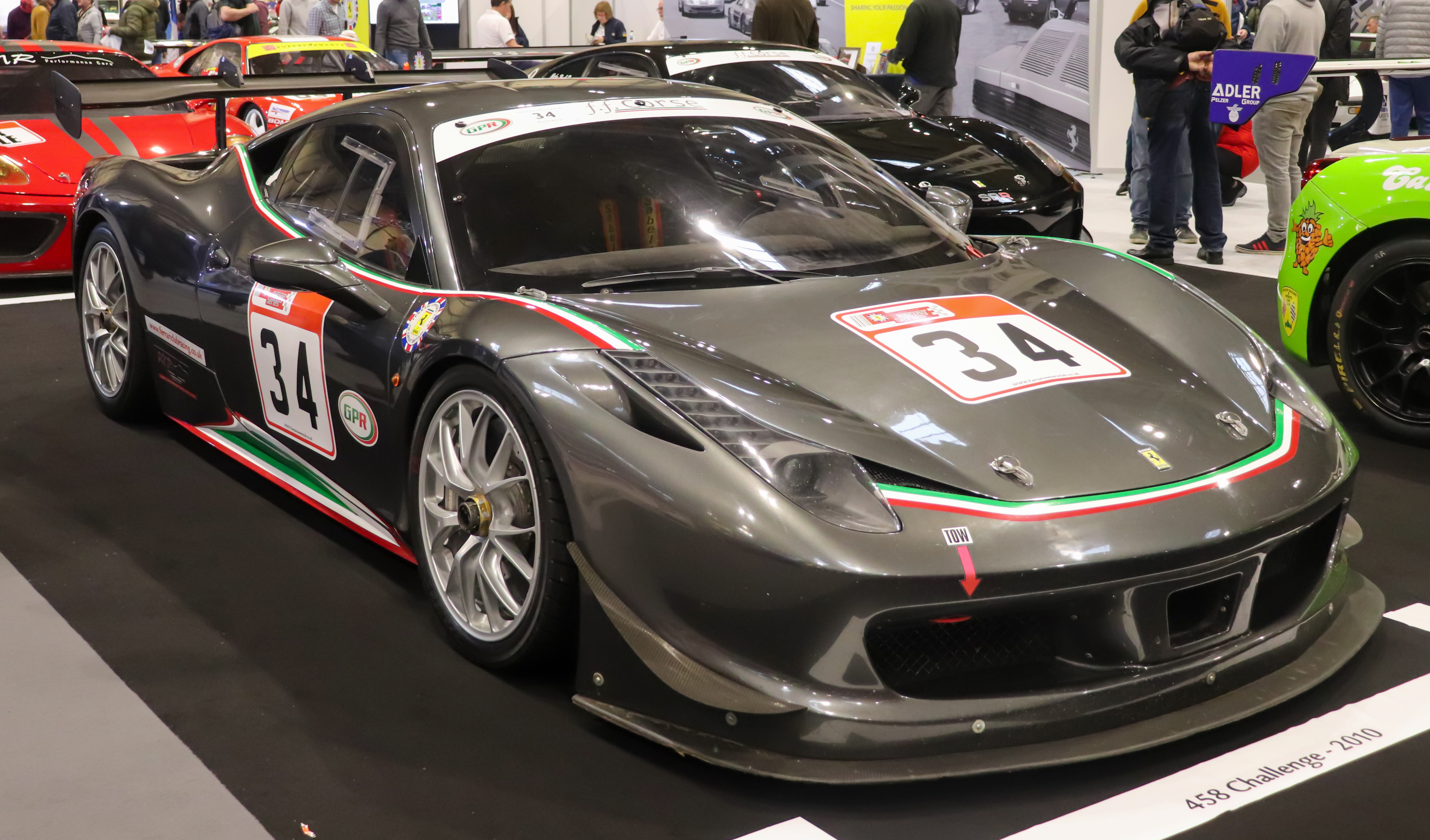
458 Challenge Evoluzione

The 458 Challenge is a race car designed to participate in the Ferrari Challenge. It was presented at the Ferrari Annual Dealer Meeting on 14 July 2010 for the 2011 Ferrari Challenge season. The 458 Challenge Evo was introduced for the 2014 season and was replaced by the 488 Challenge for the 2017 season. Hence both variants of the 458 Challenge were used as the prime Challenge car for three seasons, the 458 Challenge for 2011 to 2013 and the 458 Challenge Evo for 2014 to 2016.

According to Ferrari the standard (non-Evo) 458 Challenge can lap the Fiorano test track in 1:16.5, which is two seconds faster than its F430 Challenge predecessor and only 0.2 seconds slower than the Ferrari FXX. Given the Evo upgrade, the 458 Challenge Evo is faster around the Fiorano test track than the Ferrari FXX.

Weight of the 458 Challenge was reduced from the standard 458 through the use of thinner body panels, carbon fibre replacement panels, and polycarbonate windows and windshield. Other differences over the regular road legal 458 include a racing cockpit with a Sabelt racing seat and six-point seat-belt harness, detachable steering wheel using a Lifeline quick-detach, plumbed-in Lifeline fire extinguisher system, air-jack mounting on the rear to lift the car up, racing fuel filler cap, center-lock wheels, a racing exhaust as well as tow hooks on the front and rear. The 2014 Evo upgrade was mainly focused on improving the aerodynamics of the 458 Challenge, with the most obvious change being the inclusion of a large rear wing. Ferrari sold an Evo upgrade kit, so that pre-2014 458 Challenge cars could be upgraded by Ferrari dealers and race teams to Evo spec.

Total production of the 458 Challenge and 458 Challenge Evo combined is just under 150 cars. Of this total, production of the Evo version is estimated at 30%, meaning that just over 100 458 Challenges and a little under 50 458 Challenge Evos were produced. It is estimated that between five and ten cars were destroyed through accidents each season, meaning that somewhere between 25 and 50 458 Challenge cars have been lost with the remaining cars possibly numbering less than 100.

=== 458 Italia GT2 ===
Ferrari 458 Italia GT2
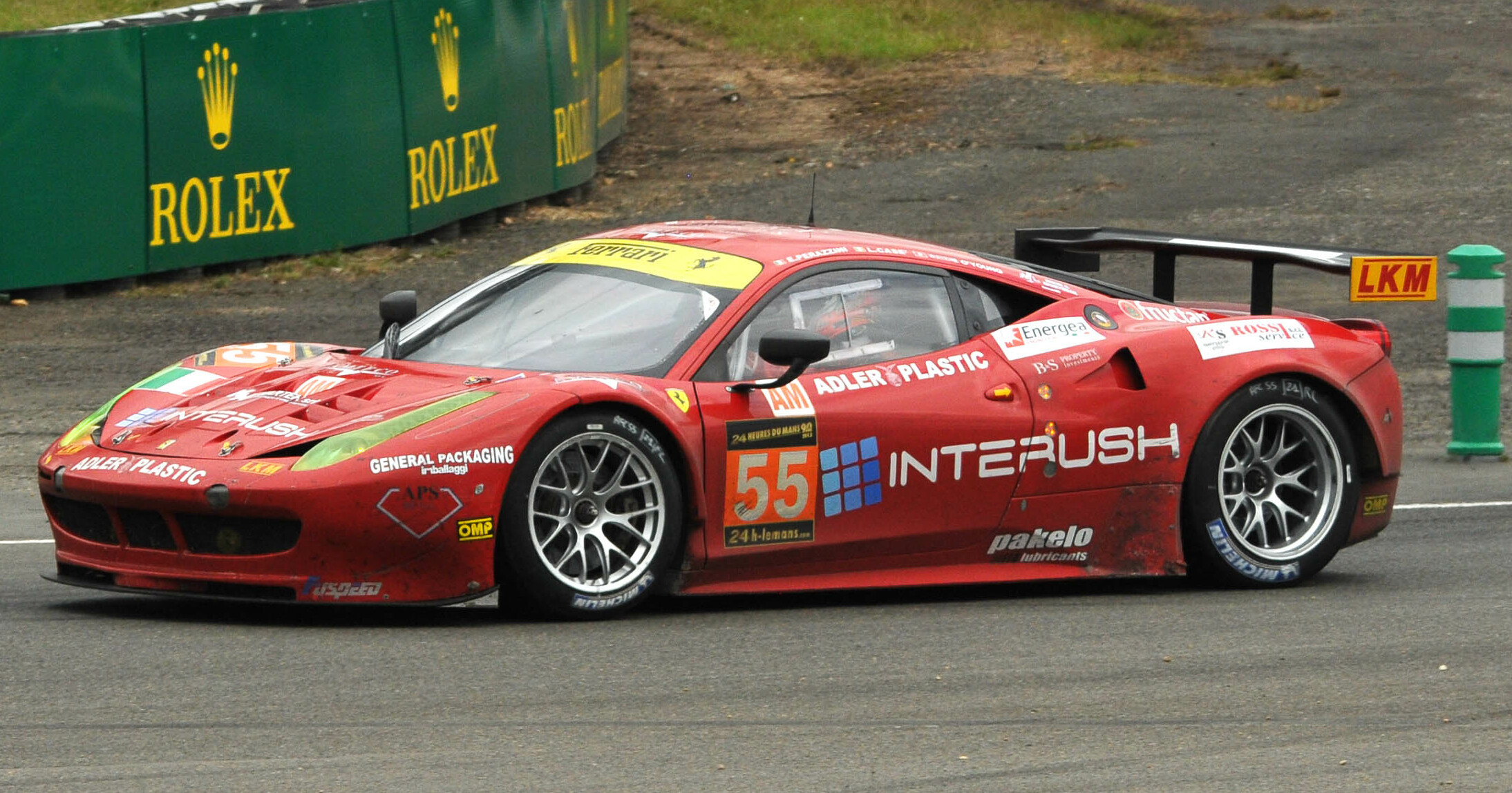
- Category: ACO GTE
- Constructor: Ferrari; Michelotto Engineering SpA

Technical specifications
- Chassis: Aluminium Monocoque
- Suspension (front): Double wishbone
- Suspension (rear): Multi-link
- Length: 4,518 millimetres (177.9 in)
- Width: 2,036 millimetres (80.2 in)
- Height: 1,160 millimetres (46 in)
- Axle track: 1,720 millimetres (68 in); 1,688 millimetres (66.5 in)
- Wheelbase: 2,650 millimetres (104 in)
- Engine: Ferrari F136 4,498 cc (274.5 cu in) V8 Naturally aspirated mid-engined, longitudinally mounted
- Transmission: Hewland 6-speed sequential manual
- Power: 465 brake horsepower (471 PS; 347 kW) @ 6,250 rpm 520 newton-metres (380 lb⋅ft) @ 5,750 rpm
- Weight: 1,245 kg (2,745 lb)
- Tyres: M, P, D, H

Competition history
- Notable entrants: AF Corse; Risi Competizione; JMW Motorsport; Extreme Speed Motorsports; Luxury Racing
- Notable drivers: Toni Vilander; Gianmaria Bruni; Giancarlo Fisichella; Jaime Melo; Mika Salo
- Debut: 2011 12 Hours of Sebring
Races	Wins	Poles
617	104	103
- Teams' Championships: 15
- Drivers' Championships: 18

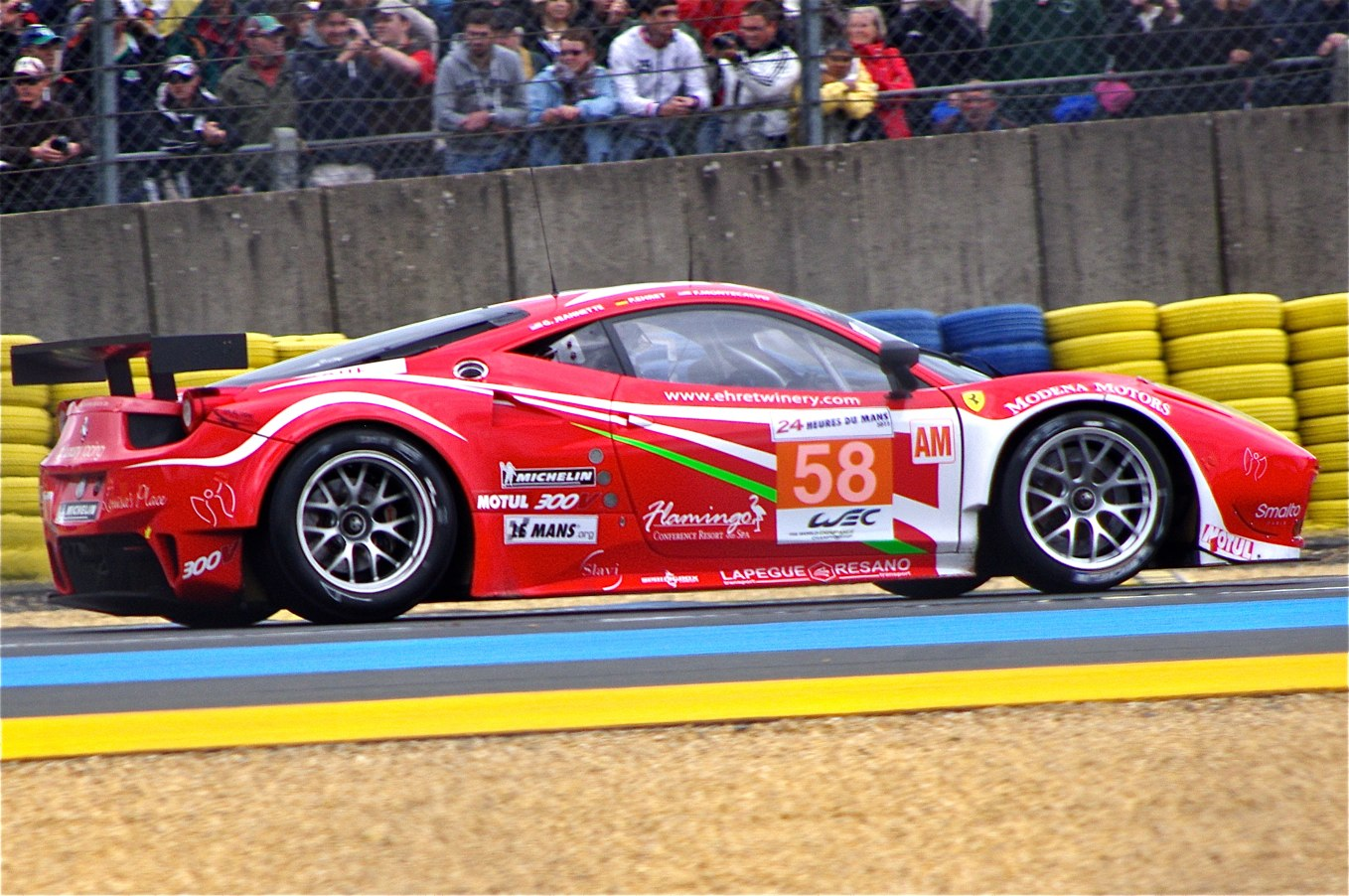
Ferrari 458 Italia GT2 at Le Mans in 2012

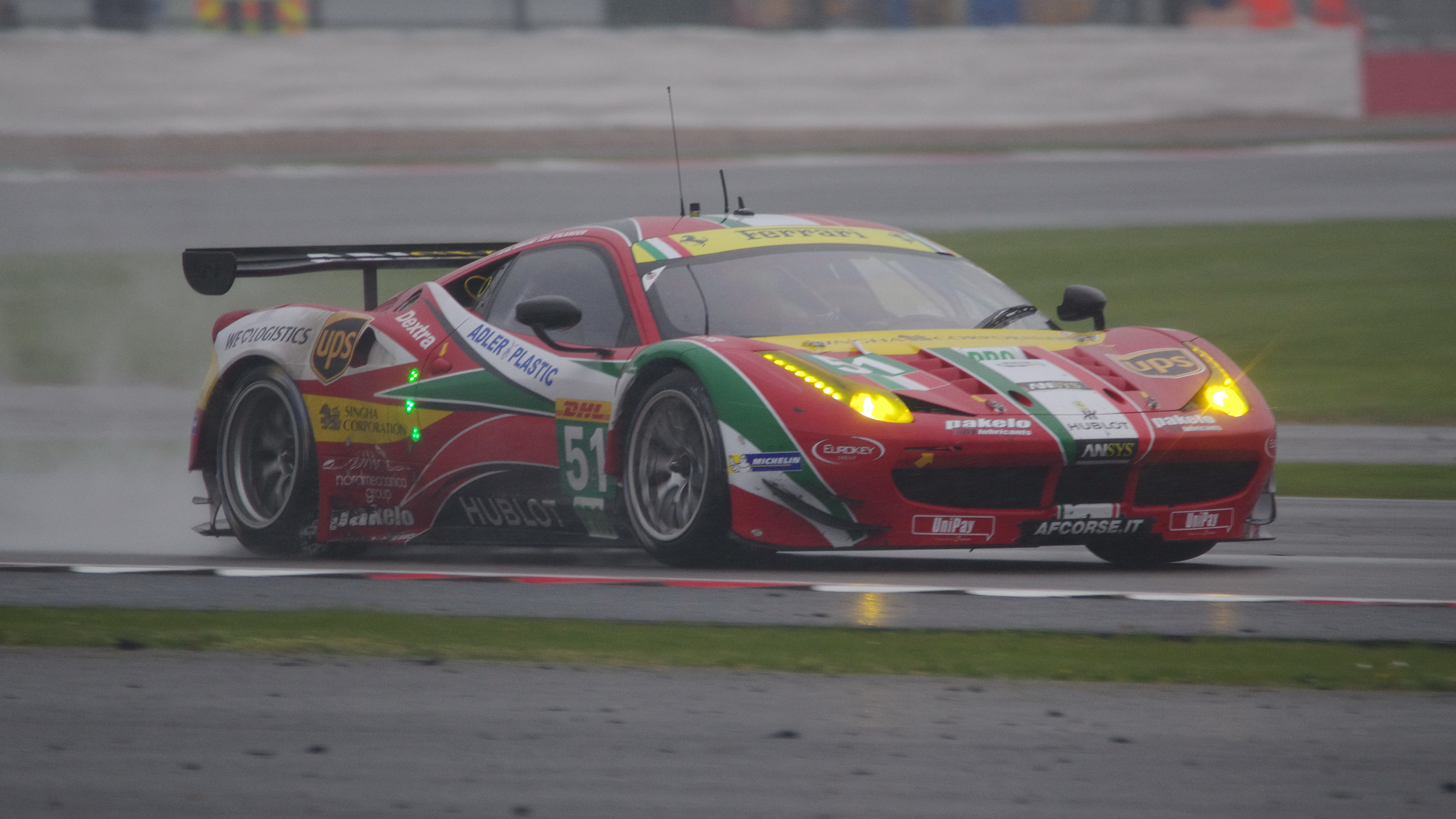
Ferrari 458 Italia GT2 at Silverstone in 2014

Ferrari unveiled their new GTE class racer in 2011 built by long-time Ferrari sportscar racing constructor Michelotto, to take part in Championships sanctioned by the ACO and the FIA. The 458 Italia GT2 drops the "flex splitter" found in the road cars in favour of a more conventional inlet, with the air exiting out through the louvers in the bonnet. Under new restrictor regulations, the 4.5-litre V8 engine generates a power output of 470 PS (346 kW; 464 hp), which is less than the road car and the 458 Challenge. Unlike the road car, which has a high-revving low-torque engine, the engine in the GTE version only has a red line of 6,250 rpm, but maintains a close-to-stock torque number even with the horsepower loss. The double-clutch gearbox had to be replaced, but paddle-shifting is retained since the amended rules in 2011 allow them.

The car won the 2012 and 2014 24 Hours of Le Mans, the 2012 12 Hours of Sebring and two editions of the Petit Le Mans, the first in 2011 and the second in 2012.

In 2011, the 458 Italia GT2 took the Intercontinental Le Mans Cup GTE Manufacturers' and the GTE PRO Team Titles, the Le Mans Series GTE Manufacturers' and GTE PRO Team and Drivers' honours and the International GT Open Overall and Super GT Team and Drivers' crowns. The following year, with the creation of an FIA-managed World Championship, the car obtained the GTE Manufacturers' and GTE PRO Team Titles in the FIA World Endurance Championship. In the same year the Italian car gained the European Le Mans Series GTE PRO Team and Drivers' honours and the International GT Open Overall and Super GT Manufacturers', Team and Drivers' crowns. In 2013 the car repeated its successes, winning the FIA World Endurance Championship GTE Manufacturers', GTE PRO Team, GTE Drivers' and GTE AM Team Titles, the European Le Mans Series GTE Team and Drivers' honours, the Asian Le Mans Series GTE Team and Drivers' crowns and the International GT Open Overall and Super GT Manufacturers' and Drivers' Titles. In 2014 the 458 Italia GT2 achieved, for the third straight year, the FIA World Endurance Championship GTE Manufacturers' and GTE PRO Team honours, as well as, for the second time in a row, the GTE Drivers' crown (which had been instituted in 2013). For the fourth time the car also clinched the European Le Mans Series GTE Team and Drivers' Titles, but it didn't take part in the International GT Open and Asian Le Mans Series Championships (the 458 Italia GT3 raced in both these series that year).

In 2015, the Ferrari 458 Italia GT2 cars competed in the FIA World Endurance Championship, European Le Mans Series and Tudor United SportsCar Championship.

The car was replaced for the 2016 season by the Ferrari 488 GTE.

=== 458 Italia GT3 ===
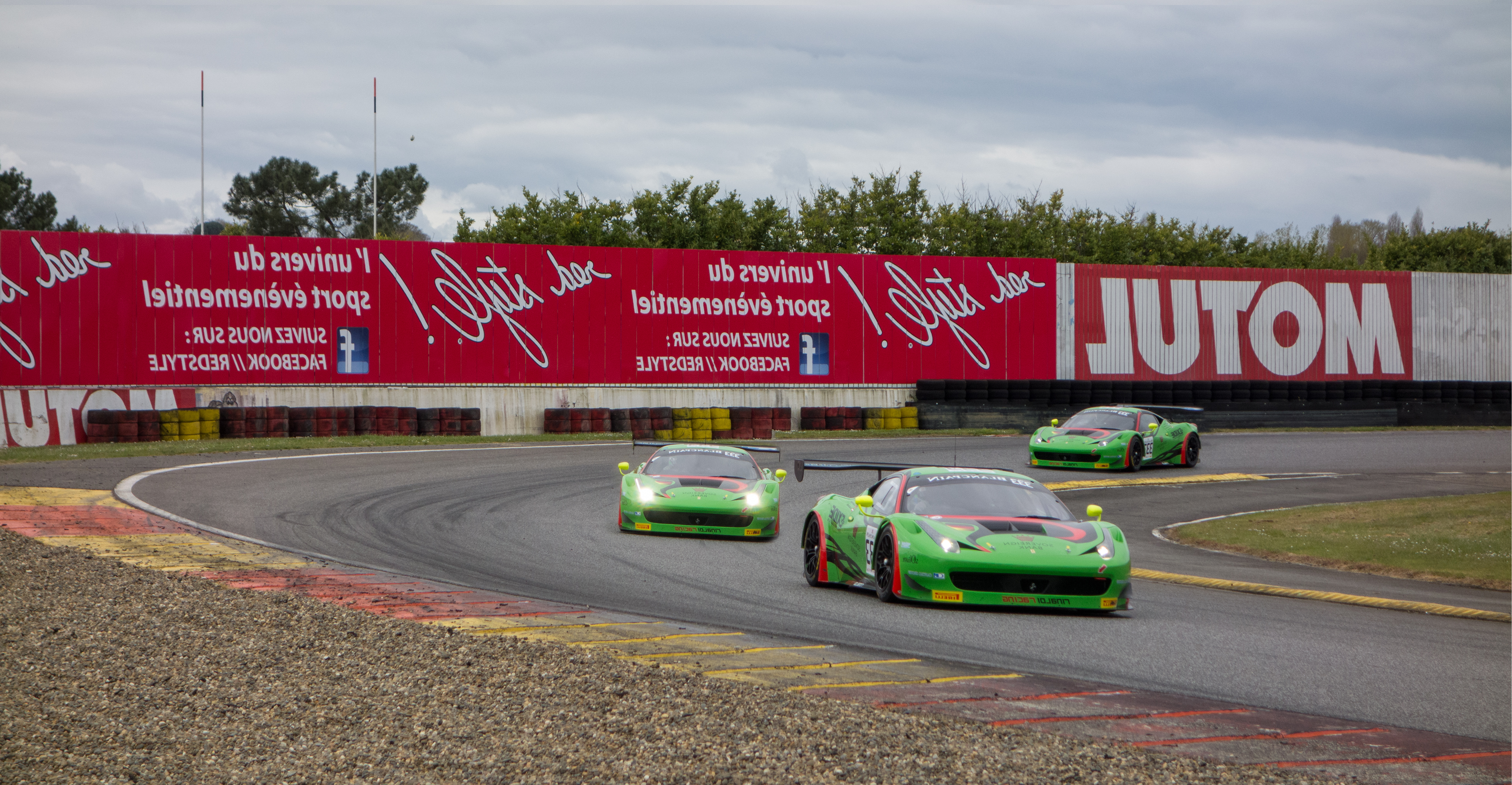
Ferrari 458 Italia GT3

Ferrari also unveiled a GT3 version of the Ferrari 458 Italia in 2011, built as well by Michelotto. The car is slightly lighter and more powerful than the GTE version, generating a power output closer to 558 PS (410 kW; 550 hp) and has a red-line of 9,000 rpm. The engine thus performs more similarly to that of the road car than the GTE version. The aerodynamics of the car are also slightly different due to different aero regulations.

The 458 Italia GT3 has achieved many important victories in its career. It has won six times the 24 Hours of Spa-Francorchamps (two in the GT3 PRO AM category and two in the Gentlemen Trophy), four times the Gulf 12 Hours (three overall and one in the Gentlemen Trophy), the 2013 and 2014 12 Hours of Sepang, the 2014 and 2015 24 Hours of Dubai in the A6-AM class, the 2014 Liqui Moly Bathurst 12 Hour at the famous Mount Panorama Circuit in Bathurst and the 2014 24 Hours of Barcelona.

The 458 Italia GT3 holds the record for the number of titles won in many international Championships. In the Blancpain Endurance Series it took the 2011, 2012 and 2014 GT3 PRO AM Team and Drivers' crowns and the 2013 and 2014 Gentlemen Trophy Team and Drivers' honours, while in the European Le Mans Series, since the creation by the ACO of a GT3 class, clinched the 2013 and 2014 GTC Team and Drivers' Titles. In the International GT Open the Maranello car gained the 2011, 2012 and 2014 GTS Team and Drivers' crowns, the 2012, 2013 and 2014 GTS Manufacturers' honours and the 2014 Overall and Super GT Drivers' Titles. The 458 Italia GT3 has also a strong racing record in the most important Asian GT series, the GT3 Asia, in which it achieved the 2011 Drivers' crown and the 2012 and 2014 Team and Drivers' honours. The car has also been driven to win the 2011 FIA GT3 Drivers' Title, the 2013 Asian Le Mans Series GTC Team and Drivers' crowns and successes in national Championships like French GT, British GT, Italian GT, GTSprint and Supercar Challenge.

In 2015, the 458 Italia GT3 was involved in numerous racing series, including Blancpain Endurance Series, European Le Mans Series, International GT Open, GT3 Asia, Pirelli World Challenge, Blancpain Sprint Series, Asian Le Mans Series, Australian GT Championship and many other national GT3 Championships.

=== 458 Italia Grand-Am ===
In 2012, Ferrari developed a modified version of the 458 GT3 for Grand-Am. The car weighs the same but produces less downforce than the GT3 car; the engine is also restricted more heavily, generating a power output of 507 PS (373 kW; 500 hp) and having an 8,000 rpm redline. Instead of a dual-clutch automatic transmission, the car is fitted with a conventional sequential manual transmission.

The roll-cage is also modified due to stricter safety regulations. The Grand-Am version lacks traction control and ABS. The car debuted at the 2012 24 Hours of Daytona. AimAutosport.com is the first team to win with the new 458 Italia Grand-Am spec. On 9 Sept. 2012, drivers Jeff Segal and Emil Assentato finished second at Laguna Seca and clinched the Grand-Am Rolex GT championship.

== Awards ==
The 458 won "Car of the Year 2009" and "Supercar of the Year". It also won "Cabrio of the Year 2011" for the Spider, from Top Gear magazine. Auto Zeitung magazine awarded the Ferrari 458 Spider "Best Cabrio 2011". Motor Trend awarded the Ferrari 458 Italia the title of "Best Driver's Car" in 2011. The 458 Speciale won Top Gear's Supercar of the Year 2013 and James May's Car of the Year.

== Recalls ==
=== Wheel-arch adhesive fires ===
On 24 August 2010, BBC News reported that ten 458s had either crashed or caught fire in just three months. Ferrari responded later that it was aware of the fire-related cases, and was in the process of investigating them.

On 1 September 2010, Ferrari officially recalled all 1,248 of the 458s sold to date. A spokesman commented that the problem had been traced to an adhesive used in the wheel-arch assemblies and that, in certain circumstances, the glue could begin to overheat, smoke and even catch fire. In extreme cases the melting adhesive could lead to the heat shield deforming, and hence moving closer to the exhaust, causing the wheel-arch lining to catch fire. Owners who had reported fires, that were later confirmed by independent engineers to be due to this problem, received a new car. All other cars were modified by replacing the adhesive with mechanical fasteners.

=== Engine seizure ===
In 2012, Ferrari recalled certain 2011 and 2012 US market cars because the engine could seize suddenly and possibly cause a crash. The F136 engines had incorrectly mounted crankshafts. The manufacturer learned of one such incident from a review car lent to critics. Owners could choose from having a new engine installed by their dealer, having the engine removed and the work done by Ferrari North America or having a new crankshaft and bearings installed at the dealership.

== Marketing ==
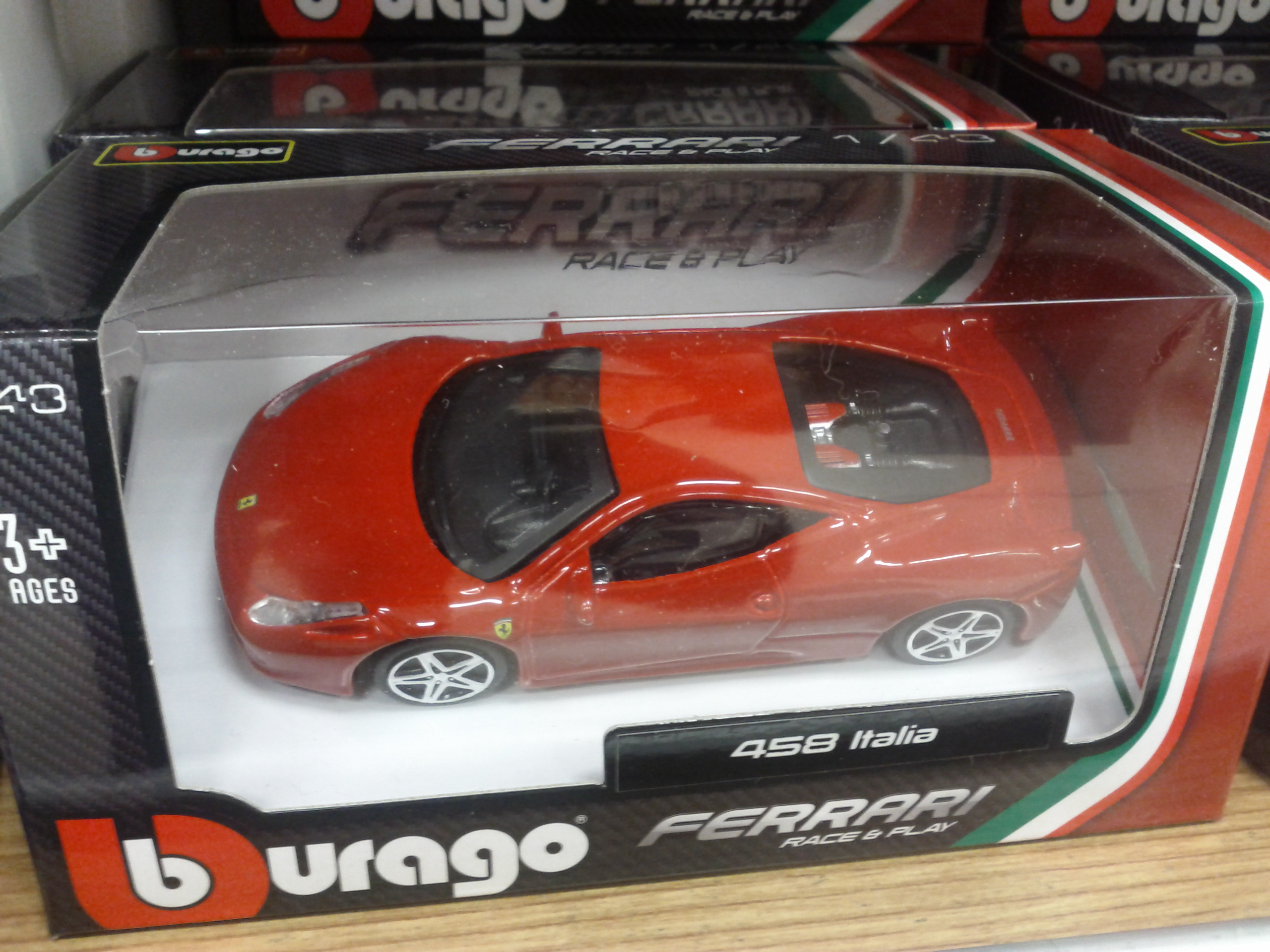
The 458 Italia and its subsequent variants were replicated by various model makers in various scales. This example was replicated by Bburago in 1/43 scale.

Hot Wheels produced a 1:18 scale model of the 458 Italia, Spider, GT2, Challenge, China Edition and, later, the Speciale versions under both its regular "Mattel / Heritage" and premium "Elite" and "Super Elite" lines of collectible die-cast models. Bburago also produced variants of the 458, such as the Italia, Spider and Challenge, in diecast in 1:18, 1:24, 1:32, and 1:43 scales under its "Race and play" line up. The Speciale version in 1:18 scale followed later under both its "Race and play" and "Signature series" lineups.

The 458 was featured on the cover of Forza Motorsport 4.

== Illicit trade practices investigation ==
After the Ferrari 458 Italia had been reported to cost much more in China than the United States, the Chinese Automobile Dealers Association (CADA) began working in conjunction with the National Development and Reform Commission for possible price-fixing, despite automakers' claim of a 24% import tariff, 17% value-added tax, and a consumption tax having been added to the car's price.
