= 2011 International GT Open =

Seasons
- ← 2010 2012 →

The 2011 International GT Open season was the sixth season of the International GT Open, the grand tourer-style sports car racing founded in 2006 by the Spanish GT Sport Organización. It began on 30 April at Autodromo Enzo e Dino Ferrari and finished on 30 October, at Circuit de Catalunya after eight double-header meetings.

The season was won by JMB Racing driver Soheil Ayari, who raced on the Ferrari F458 GT2. He also won the Super GT standings. Lorenzo Bontempelli and Stefano Gattuso, who raced behind the wheel of Kessel Racing's Ferrari 430 GT3 Scuderia won the GTS class.

== Race calendar and results ==
- The series' provisional calendar was announced on 12 December 2010, with the Nürburgring meeting later replaced by a meeting in Portimão in January 2011.

| Round | | Circuit | Date | SGT Winner | GTS Winner |
|---|---|---|---|---|---|
| 1 | R1 | (Italy) Autodromo Enzo e Dino Ferrari, Imola | 30 April | No. 5 Vittoria Competizioni | No. 57 AutOrlando Sport |
| 1 | R1 | (Italy) Autodromo Enzo e Dino Ferrari, Imola | 30 April | (Italy) Marco Frezza (Argentina) Juan Manuel López | (Italy) Fabio Babini (Italy) Gianluca Roda |
| 1 | R2 | (Italy) Autodromo Enzo e Dino Ferrari, Imola | 1 May | No. 4 AutOrlando Sport | No. 51Kessel Racing |
| 1 | R2 | (Italy) Autodromo Enzo e Dino Ferrari, Imola | 1 May | (Spain) Álvaro Barba (Italy) Andrea Ceccato | (Italy) Lorenzo Bontempelli (Italy) Stefano Gattuso |
| 2 | R1 | (France) Circuit de Nevers Magny-Cours | 14 May | No. 8 Scuderia Villorba Corse | No. 51 Kessel Racing |
| 2 | R1 | (France) Circuit de Nevers Magny-Cours | 14 May | (Italy) Andrea Montermini (Italy) Emanuele Moncini | (Italy) Lorenzo Bontempelli (Italy) Stefano Gattuso |
| 2 | R2 | (France) Circuit de Nevers Magny-Cours | 15 May | No. 5 Vittoria Competizioni | No. 57 AutOrlando Sport |
| 2 | R2 | (France) Circuit de Nevers Magny-Cours | 15 May | (Italy) Marco Frezza (Argentina) Juan Manuel López | (Italy) Fabio Babini (Italy) Gianluca Roda |
| 3 | R1 | (Belgium) Circuit de Spa-Francorchamps | 25 June | No. 8 Scuderia Villorba Corse | No. 51 Kessel Racing |
| 3 | R1 | (Belgium) Circuit de Spa-Francorchamps | 25 June | (Italy) Andrea Montermini (Italy) Emanuele Moncini | (Italy) Lorenzo Bontempelli (Italy) Stefano Gattuso |
| 3 | R2 | (Belgium) Circuit de Spa-Francorchamps | 26 June | No. 5 Vittoria Competizioni | No. 54 Villois Racing |
| 3 | R2 | (Belgium) Circuit de Spa-Francorchamps | 26 June | (Italy) Marco Frezza (Argentina) Juan Manuel López | (Italy) Massimiliano Wiser (Italy) Gabriele Lancieri |
| 4 | R1 | (United Kingdom) Brands Hatch | 23 July | No. 9 JMB Racing | No. 68 AF Corse |
| 4 | R1 | (United Kingdom) Brands Hatch | 23 July | (France) Soheil Ayari (France) Nicolas Marroc | (United Kingdom) Daniel Brown (United Kingdom) Glynn Geddie |
| 4 | R2 | (United Kingdom) Brands Hatch | 24 July | No. 9 JMB Racing | No. 51 Kessel Racing |
| 4 | R2 | (United Kingdom) Brands Hatch | 24 July | (France) Soheil Ayari (France) Nicolas Marroc | (Italy) Lorenzo Bontempelli (Italy) Stefano Gattuso |
| 5 | R1 | (Austria) Red Bull Ring | 27 August | No. 4 AutOrlando Sport | No. 60 AF Corse |
| 5 | R1 | (Austria) Red Bull Ring | 27 August | (Spain) Álvaro Barba (Italy) Andrea Ceccato | (Italy) Stefano Bizzarri (Italy) Andrea Rizzoli |
| 5 | R2 | (Austria) Red Bull Ring | 28 August | No. 11 Kessel Racing | No. 51 Kessel Racing |
| 5 | R2 | (Austria) Red Bull Ring | 28 August | (Austria) Philipp Peter (Poland) Michał Broniszewski | (Italy) Lorenzo Bontempelli (Italy) Stefano Gattuso |
| 6 | R1 | (Portugal) Autódromo Internacional do Algarve, Portimão | 17 September | No. 3 Racing Team Edil-Cris | No. 57 AutOrlando Sport |
| 6 | R1 | (Portugal) Autódromo Internacional do Algarve, Portimão | 17 September | (Italy) Raffaele Giammaria (Portugal) Miguel Ramos | (Italy) Fabio Babini (Italy) Gianluca Roda |
| 6 | R2 | (Portugal) Autódromo Internacional do Algarve, Portimão | 18 September | No. 9 JMB Racing | No. 60 AF Corse |
| 6 | R2 | (Portugal) Autódromo Internacional do Algarve, Portimão | 18 September | (France) Soheil Ayari (Switzerland) Joël Camathias | (Italy) Stefano Bizzarri (Italy) Andrea Rizzoli |
| 7 | R1 | (Italy) Autodromo Nazionale Monza | 1 October | No. 11 Kessel Racing | No. 57 AutOrlando Sport |
| 7 | R1 | (Italy) Autodromo Nazionale Monza | 1 October | (Austria) Philipp Peter (Poland) Michał Broniszewski | (Italy) Paolo Ruberti (Italy) Gianluca Roda |
| 7 | R2 | (Italy) Autodromo Nazionale Monza | 2 October | No. 8 Scuderia Villorba Corse | No. 57 AutOrlando Sport |
| 7 | R2 | (Italy) Autodromo Nazionale Monza | 2 October | (Italy) Andrea Montermini (Italy) Emanuele Moncini | (Italy) Paolo Ruberti (Italy) Gianluca Roda |
| 8 | R1 | (Spain) Circuit de Catalunya | 29 October | No. 9 JMB Racing | No. 60 AF Corse |
| 8 | R1 | (Spain) Circuit de Catalunya | 29 October | (France) Soheil Ayari (Switzerland) Joël Camathias | (Italy) Stefano Bizzarri (Italy) Andrea Rizzoli |
| 8 | R2 | (Spain) Circuit de Catalunya | 30 October | No. 5 Vittoria Competizioni | No. 51 Kessel Racing |
| 8 | R2 | (Spain) Circuit de Catalunya | 30 October | (Italy) Alessandro Pier Guidi (Argentina) Juan Manuel López | (Italy) Lorenzo Bontempelli (Italy) Stefano Gattuso |

== Standings ==
=== Drivers ===
==== Super GT ====
| Pos | Driver | Pts |
|---|---|---|
| 1 | (France) Soheil Ayari | 88 |
| 2 | (Italy) Andrea Montermini | 79 |
| 2 | (Italy) Emanuele Moncini | 79 |
| 4 | (Italy) Marco Frezza | 78 |
| 5 | (Argentina) Juan Manuel López | 74 |
| 6 | (Portugal) Miguel Ramos | 74 |
| 7 | (Italy) Raffaele Giammaria | 62 |
| 8 | (Austria) Philipp Peter | 51 |
| 8 | (Poland) Michał Broniszewski | 51 |
| 10 | (Switzerland) Joël Camathias | 47 |
| 11 | (Spain) Álvaro Barba | 47 |
| 11 | (Italy) Andrea Ceccato | 47 |
| 13 | (Italy) Alessandro Garofano | 42 |
| 13 | (Italy) Luca Rangoni | 42 |
| 15 | (France) Nicolas Marroc | 32 |

=== Teams ===
==== Super GT ====
| Pos | Team | Pts |
|---|---|---|
| 1 | JMB Racing | 102 |
| 2 | Scuderia Villorba | 79 |
| 3 | Vittoria Competizioni | 74 |
| 4 | Racing Team Edil-Cris | 74 |
| 5 | Kessel Racing | 51 |
| 6 | AutOrlando | 47 |
| 7 | AF Corse | 45 |
| 8 | AT Racing Team | 13 |
| 9 | Luxury Racing | 11 |
